= List of Eagle-Lion films =

Films released by the Pathé Industries subsidiaries Eagle-Lion Films (producer and distributor) and Eagle-Lion Classics (solely distributor) between 1947 and 1951. The companies' releases were a mixture of imports from Britain, mainly from the J. Arthur Rank Organization (originator of the Eagle-Lion brand), and American productions both in-house and from independent producers. Some of Eagle-Lion's earliest releases were produced by another Pathé subsidiary, Producers Releasing Corporation, and are included in the List of PRC films. PRC was absorbed into Eagle-Lion between late 1947 and early 1948. In 1950, in-house production ceased and Eagle-Lion Films was merged with independent reissues distributor Film Classics to create Eagle-Lion Classics. The following year, Eagle-Lion Classics was acquired by and merged into United Artists.

== Films ==
Title	American Release Date	Director	Notes
It's a Joke, Son!	January 15, 1947	Benjamin Stoloff	
Bedelia	February 1, 1947	Lance Comfort	Made in Britain
Lost Honeymoon	March 29, 1947	Leigh Jason	
I See a Dark Stranger	April 3, 1947	Frank Launder	Made in Britain
Out of the Blue	April 21, 1947	Leigh Jason	
Repeat Performance	May 22, 1947	Alfred L. Werker	
Stepchild	June 7, 1947	James Flood	
Green for Danger	August 7, 1947	Sidney Gilliat	Made in Britain
Red Stallion	August 16, 1947	Lesley Selander	
Philo Vance's Secret Mission	August 30, 1947	Reginald LeBorg	
Bury Me Dead	October 18, 1947	Bernard Vorhaus	
Linda, Be Good	October 18, 1947	Frank McDonald	
Black Hills	October 26, 1947	Ray Taylor	
Beware of Pity	October 31, 1947	Maurice Elvey	Made in Britain
The Return of Rin Tin Tin	November 1, 1947	Max Nosseck	
Love from a Stranger	November 15, 1947	Richard Whorf	
Whispering City	November 20, 1947	Fyodor Otsep	
Heading for Heaven	December 6, 1947	Lewis D. Collins	
T-Men	December 15, 1947	Anthony Mann	
The Man Within	January 31, 1948	Bernard Knowles	Made in Britain
Open Secret	January 31, 1948	John Reinhardt	
Adventures of Casanova	February 7, 1948	Roberto Gavaldón	
The Man from Texas	March 6, 1948	Leigh Jason	
The Enchanted Valley	March 24, 1948	Robert Emmett Tansey	
Close-Up	April 3, 1948	Jack Donohue	
The Noose Hangs High	April 5, 1948	Charles Barton	
The October Man	April 15, 1948	Roy Ward Baker	Made in Britain
Ruthless	April 16, 1948	Edgar G. Ulmer	
The Cobra Strikes	April 24, 1948	Charles Reisner	
Assigned to Danger	May 19, 1948	Budd Boetticher	
Raw Deal	May 26, 1948	Anthony Mann	
Sword of the Avenger	June 2, 1948	Sidney Salkow	
Shed No Tears	June 9, 1948	Jean Yarbrough	
The Tioga Kid	June 17, 1948	Ray Taylor	
Mickey	June 23, 1948	Ralph Murphy	
Canon City	June 30, 1948	Crane Wilbur	
Northwest Stampede	July 28, 1948	Albert S. Rogell	
The Amazing Mr. X	July 29, 1948	Bernard Vorhaus	
Lady at Midnight	August 15, 1948	Sam Newfield	
Hollow Triumph	August 18, 1948	Steve Sekely	
In This Corner	September 20, 1948	Charles Reisner	
The Strange Mrs. Crane	October 8, 1948	Sam Newfield	
The Red Shoes	October 22, 1948	Michael Powell	Made in Britain
Million Dollar Weekend	October 29, 1948	Gene Raymond	
Behind Locked Doors	October 1948	Budd Boetticher	
Blanche Fury	November 23, 1948	Marc Allégret	Made in Britain
He Walked by Night	November 24, 1948	Alfred L. Werker	
Parole, Inc.	November 24, 1948	Alfred Zeisler	
Let's Live a Little	December 9, 1948	Richard Wallace	
Adventures of Gallant Bess	December 22, 1948	Lew Landers	
Waterloo Road	December 24, 1948	Sidney Gilliat	Made in Britain
Don't Take It to Heart	December 24, 1948	Jeffrey Dell	Made in Britain
Mr. Perrin and Mr. Traill	January 15, 1949	Lawrence Huntington	Made in Britain
Take My Life	January 18, 1949	Ronald Neame	Made in Britain
An Old-Fashioned Girl	January 19, 1949	Arthur Dreifuss	
A Canterbury Tale	January 21, 1949	Michael Powell	Made in Britain
The Woman in the Hall	January 22, 1949	Jack Lee	Made in Britain
Ride, Ryder, Ride!	February 2, 1949	Lewis D. Collins	
A Place of One's Own	February 7, 1949	Bernard Knowles	Made in Britain
Shamrock Hill	February 10, 1949	Arthur Dreifuss	
My Brother's Keeper	February 12, 1949	Alfred Roome	Made in Britain
Easy Money	February 12, 1949	Bernard Knowles	Made in Britain
It Always Rains on Sunday	February 13, 1949	Robert Hamer	Made in Britain
Quartet	March 28, 1949	Ken Annakin, Arthur Crabtree	Made in Britain
Tulsa	April 13, 1949	Stuart Heisler	
Sleeping Car to Trieste	April 16, 1949	Lawrence Huntington	Made in Britain
Scott of the Antarctic	April 20, 1949	Charles Frend	Made in Britain
Caravan	April 20, 1949	Arthur Crabtree	Made in Britain
Miranda	April 20, 1949	Ken Annakin	Made in Britain
Passport to Pimlico	April 28, 1949	Henry Cornelius	Made in Britain
Red Stallion in the Rockies	May 2, 1949	Ralph Murphy	
The Big Cat	May 19, 1949	Phil Karlson	
Broken Journey	May 25, 1949	Ken Annakin	Made in Britain
All Over the Town	May 25, 1949	Derek N. Twist	Made in Britain
Alimony	June 11, 1949	Alfred Zeisler	
Saraband for Dead Lovers	June 11, 1949	Basil Dearden	Made in Britain
Against the Wind	June 25, 1949	Charles Crichton	Made in Britain
The Weaker Sex	July 9, 1949	Roy Ward Baker	Made in Britain
Once Upon a Dream	July 14, 1949	Ralph Thomas	Made in Britain
Roll, Thunder, Roll!	August 27, 1949	Lewis D. Collins	
Spring in Park Lane	September 20, 1949	Herbert Wilcox	Made in Britain
Zamba	September 29, 1949	William Berke	
Trapped	October 1, 1949	Richard Fleischer	
The Fighting Redhead	October 5, 1949	Lewis D. Collins	
Reign of Terror	October 15, 1949	Anthony Mann	
Port of New York	November 28, 1949	László Benedek	
Cowboy and the Prizefighter	December 15, 1949	Lewis D. Collins	
The Chiltern Hundreds	December 1949	John Paddy Carstairs	Made in Britain
Obsession	January 8, 1950	Edward Dmytryk	Made in Britain
Sarumba	January 1950	Marion Gering	
Never Fear	January 1950	Ida Lupino	
The Sundowners	February 2, 1950	George Templeton	
Guilty of Treason	February 20, 1950	Felix E. Feist	
The Boy from Indiana	March 1, 1950	John Rawlins	
The Great Rupert	March 1, 1950	Irving Pichel	
Forbidden Jungle	March 2, 1950	Robert Emmett Tansey	
The Winslow Boy	March 20, 1950	Anthony Asquith	Made in Britain
The Golden Gloves Story	March 22, 1950	Felix E. Feist	
The Fighting Stallion	March 23, 1950	Robert Emmett Tansey	
Kill or Be Killed	April 1950	Max Nosseck	
The Perfect Woman	April 1950	Bernard Knowles	Made in Britain
The Jackie Robinson Story	May 16, 1950	Alfred E. Green	
The Glass Mountain	May 17, 1950	Henry Cass	Made in Britain
The Torch	June 2, 1950	Emilio Fernández	
Timber Fury	June 2, 1950	Bernard B. Ray	
Kind Hearts and Coronets	June 14, 1950	Robert Hamer	Made in Britain
Federal Man	June 21, 1950	Robert Emmett Tansey	
It's a Small World	June 24, 1950	William Castle	
Destination Moon	June 27, 1950	Irving Pichel	
Good-Time Girl	May 11, 1950	David MacDonald	Made in Britain
The Blue Lamp	June 1, 1950	Basil Dearden	Made in Britain
I Killed Geronimo	August 8, 1950	John Hoffman	
Your Witness	August 26, 1950	Robert Montgomery	Made in Britain
High Lonesome	September 1, 1950	Alan Le May	
The Kangaroo Kid	October 22, 1950	Lesley Selander	Made in Australia
Prehistoric Women	November 1, 1950	Gregg C. Tallas	
The Sun Sets at Dawn	November 1, 1950	Paul Sloane	
Border Outlaws	November 2, 1950	Richard Talmadge	
The Second Face	December 1, 1950	Jack Bernhard	
Two Lost Worlds	January 5, 1951	Norman Dawn	
Mister Universe	January 10, 1951	Joseph Lerner	
Korea Patrol	January 15, 1951	Max Nosseck	
So Long at the Fair	January 20, 1951	Terence Fisher	Made in Britain
Rogue River	February 15, 1951	John Rawlins	
Golden Salamander	March 23, 1951	Ronald Neame	Made in Britain
Badman's Gold	April 3, 1951	Robert Emmett Tansey	
Trottie True	April 14, 1951	Brian Desmond Hurst	Made in Britain
Circle of Danger	April 17, 1951	Jacques Tourneur	Made in Britain
When I Grow Up	April 20, 1951	Michael Kanin	Released by United Artists
Two Gals and a Guy	June 24, 1951	Alfred E. Green	Released by United Artists
The Hoodlum	July 5, 1951	Max Nosseck	Released by United Artists
My Outlaw Brother	August 22, 1951	Elliott Nugent	
Cattle Queen	November 15, 1951	Robert Emmett Tansey	
