= Blazing Guns (1943 film) =

1943 film by Robert Emmett Tansey

- Theatrical release poster
- Directed by: Robert Emmett Tansey
- Screenplay by: Frances Kavanaugh; Gina Kaus
- Story by: Robert Emmett Tansey
- Produced by: Robert Emmett Tansey
- Starring: Ken Maynard; Hoot Gibson; LeRoy Mason; Emmett Lynn; Weldon Heyburn; Roy Brent
- Cinematography: Marcel Le Picard
- Edited by: Fred Bain
- Production company: Monogram Pictures
- Distributed by: Monogram Pictures
- Release date: October 8, 1943
- Running time: 54 minutes
- Country: United States
- Language: English

Blazing Guns is a 1943 American Western film directed by Robert Emmett Tansey and written by Frances Kavanaugh and Gina Kaus. The film stars Ken Maynard, Hoot Gibson, LeRoy Mason, Emmett Lynn, Weldon Heyburn and Roy Brent. The film was released on October 8, 1943, by Monogram Pictures.

== Cast ==
- Ken Maynard as Ken Maynard
- Hoot Gibson as Hoot Gibson
- LeRoy Mason as Duke Wade
- Emmett Lynn as Eagle-Eye
- Weldon Heyburn as Vic
- Roy Brent as Jim Wade
- Eddie Gribbon as Cactus Joe
- Lloyd Ingraham as Governon Brighton
- George Kamel as Weasel
- Cay Forester as Mary Baxter
- Robbie Kavanaugh as Virginia
- Frank Ellis as Lefty
- Charles King as Blackie
- Kenne Duncan as Red Higgins
- Dan White as Trigger
- Charles Murray Jr. as Mack
- Lee Roberts as Hodge
- John Bridges as Judge Foster
