= The Laramie Trail =

1944 film by John English

- Theatrical release poster
- Directed by: John English
- Screenplay by: J. Benton Cheney
- Produced by: Louis Gray
- Starring: Robert Livingston; Smiley Burnette; Linda Brent; Martin Garralaga; Emmett Lynn; John James
- Cinematography: Bud Thackery
- Edited by: Harry Keller
- Music by: Mort Glickman
- Production company: Republic Pictures
- Distributed by: Republic Pictures
- Release date: April 3, 1944
- Running time: 55 minutes
- Country: United States
- Language: English

The Laramie Trail is a 1944 American Western film directed by John English and written by J. Benton Cheney. The film stars Robert Livingston, Smiley Burnette, Linda Brent, Martin Garralaga, Emmett Lynn and John James. The film was released on April 3, 1944, by Republic Pictures.

== Cast ==
- Robert Livingston as Johnny Rapidan
- Smiley Burnette as Frog
- Linda Brent as Vega Alarcon
- Martin Garralaga as Don Louis Alarcon
- Emmett Lynn as Alfred 'Barfoot' Jennings
- John James as Jimmy Terril
- George J. Lewis as John Emerson, aka Blackie Mason
- Leander de Cordova as Esteban
- Slim Whitaker as Sheriff Jesse Law
- Bud Osborne as Deputy Chip
- Bud Geary as Hefty Gurlak / Bill Smith
- Roy Barcroft as Dick Rapidan
