= Koufax–Drysdale holdout =

1966 holdout staged by Sandy Koufax and Don Drysdale against the Los Angeles Dodgers

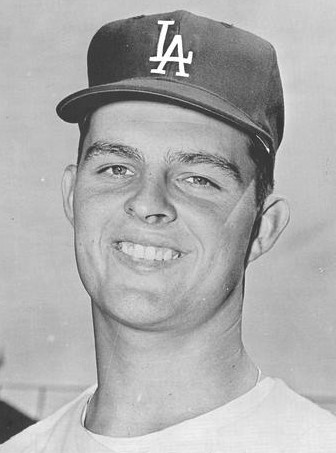
Sandy Koufax and Don Drysdale, pitchers for the Los Angeles Dodgers in the 1950s and 1960s, jointly held out prior to the 1966 season.

Prior to the 1966 Major League Baseball season, from February 28 to March 30, future Hall of Famers Sandy Koufax and Don Drysdale, star pitchers for the Los Angeles Dodgers, staged a joint holdout in which the pair demanded a fair negotiation and better contract terms from their team's front office.

Just before spring training in 1966, Koufax and Drysdale made a joint decision to hold out. Koufax, the leader during the holdout, already had previous negotiation difficulties with the Dodgers and was tired of being used against his teammates, particularly Drysdale. After learning that Buzzie Bavasi, the general manager of the Dodgers, had used the same tactic with Drysdale, the pair hired Koufax's business manager, J. William Hayes, as their agent and told the Dodgers they would negotiate only through him.

The Dodgers engaged in a publicity war against Koufax and Drysdale, attempting to divide them or paint them as greedy and selfish. Meanwhile, the pitchers took advice from Hayes and did not engage with the press. Hayes, meanwhile, prepared for a lawsuit challenging the reserve clause based on an old California case law. The possibility of such a lawsuit reportedly unnerved the Dodgers' front office, who softened their stance. Within the pair, Drysdale also felt he could not hold out indefinitely. Hence, after thirty-two days, the holdout came to an end.

The joint holdout was the first significant event in baseball's labor movement and the first time Major League players had challenged the absolute stranglehold the owners maintained over players' salaries in the era before free agency. While their initial demands were not met, both received a bigger-than-before salary raise, making Koufax and Drysdale the first $100,000 pitchers, with Koufax being the highest paid player during the 1966 season.

== Background ==
In the pre-free agency era, Major League Baseball owners had full control over a player's agency via the reserve clause. Once a player had signed with a major league team, that team "owned" the player for the duration of their stay. A player was not allowed to negotiate via a third-party (i.e. an agent) and if they did not accept a salary offered by the team, they had no other option but to threaten to quit. Within the Los Angeles Dodgers, the front office under Walter O'Malley was particularly tough, with a strict policy of negotiating directly with the players themselves.

Buzzie Bavasi, the general manager of the Dodgers, was known for his deceptive methods of negotiating a contract. He prided himself in giving as little salary to a player as possible. Amongst the methods he might use during a negotiation with a player was to leave a fake contract for a star player on his desk, then exit the room for a while. The player, noticing the lesser salary the star player apparently was getting compared to what he himself was asking, would often lower the salary he wanted.

=== Koufax's 1964 salary dispute ===
The relationship between Sandy Koufax, the Dodgers' ace and a future Hall of Famer, and Dodgers' GM Bavasi soured considerably after their salary negotiations in 1964. After his MVP- and Cy Young Award-winning performance in the 1963 season, followed by his World Series performance against the New York Yankees, Koufax asked for a $75,000 salary, writing in his autobiography:

I felt I was entitled to a healthy raise. Like double of the $35,000 I had received the year before, plus another $5,000 for good measure, good conduct, and good luck. They could hardly say I didn't deserve it."

During the negotiations, Koufax asked for an attendance clause where he would make a percentage of the profit from ticket sales as a starting point to negotiate from, noting that he was the Dodgers' top draw. However, Bavasi noted that Koufax had not led the league in innings pitched and hence, in his mind, he did not warrant a raise so big. This infuriated Koufax who had led the league in most pitching categories and had pitched the third-most innings despite the fact that his arm had been hurting.

After holding out and after days of tense negotiations, Koufax finally came down to $70,000 and signed with the Dodgers just before the team was to leave for spring training. However, soon after his signing, the Los Angeles Herald-Examiner published a story by sportswriter Bob Hunter incorrectly stating that Koufax threatened to quit if he did not get a $90,000 salary. Angered at the fact that the story had painted him as greedy, Koufax responded in an interview with Frank Finch of the Los Angeles Times that he never asked for $90,000, saying: "I've been hurt by people I thought were my friends." The more disturbing part of the story was the use of antisemitic tropes against Koufax, one of the few Jewish players in baseball at the time.

Koufax suspected that someone from the club's front office had leaked the story. During the first week of spring training, still angered and embarrassed by the way he had been treated, he approached Shirley Povich of The Washington Post, Milton Gross of the New York Post, and Joe Reichler of the Associated Press and told them his side of the story which, due to Koufax's normally quiet nature, caused a media frenzy. Eventually, Dodgers owner Walter O'Malley and Bavasi both talked Koufax down to letting the issue go. While he did, Koufax's relationship with the front office and ownership never fully recovered.

=== Relationship between Koufax and Drysdale ===
Unlike Koufax, Don Drysdale had an uncommonly close relationship with Bavasi who affectionately referred to him as "Donald". In 1964, he received a higher salary than Koufax had without any resistance or animosity from the team's front office despite his numbers having dropped from the previous season. The Dodgers also promoted Drysdale as the face of the Dodgers despite Koufax being statistically better and a bigger draw than his teammate due, in part, to Drysdale fitting the "All-American" image the team promoted and also being a California native. The team also played the two players against each other in negotiations and in the press, attempting to create tension and divide between them.

Before Koufax reached his potential, Drysdale had been the ace of the pitching staff and was favored by manager Walter Alston. By contrast, he had a less-than-ideal relationship with Koufax who had signed with his hometown Brooklyn Dodgers with very little pitching experience and, due to the bonus rule he signed under, had never spent a day in the minor leagues. Due to this, Koufax's development as a pitcher was delayed while Drysdale thrived. However, despite this, the pair became good friends and often stayed at each other's homes – Drysdale when the Dodgers were in Brooklyn, Koufax when the Dodgers moved to Los Angeles. Even when Koufax became the Dodgers' undisputed ace, and the team attempted to create a rift between them, their friendship endured.

== Holdout ==
In the offseason, prior to the 1966 season, Koufax and Drysdale met separately with general manager Buzzie Bavasi to negotiate their contracts for the upcoming season. Koufax had won his second unanimous Cy Young Award and also won the World Series MVP for his performance in the 1965 World Series. However, Bavasi refused him the salary raise he wanted, saying that Drysdale, who had won 23 games in 1965, was asking for less.

After his meeting with Bavasi, Koufax met Drysdale and his wife Ginger for dinner, still irritated at Bavasi for using his own teammate against him in the salary negotiations. Drysdale responded that Bavasi had done the same thing with him. The two compared notes on their separate negotiations, and realized that the Dodgers' GM had been playing one pitcher against the other. Ginger Drysdale, who had previously worked as a model and actress and was once a member of the Screen Actors Guild, suggested to the pair that they negotiate together in order to get what they wanted. Hence, in January 1966, the pair informed the Dodgers of their decision to hold out together.

In a highly unusual move for the time, they were represented by entertainment lawyer J. William Hayes, Koufax's business manager. Also unusual was their demand of $1 million (equivalent to $9.9 million in 2025), divided equally over the next three years, or $167,000 (equivalent to $1.66 million in 2025) each for each of the next three seasons. They told Bavasi that they would negotiate their contracts as one unit and through their agent. The Dodgers refused to talk to Hayes, however, stating it was against their policy.

A stalemate ensued; Koufax and Drysdale held firm and did not report to spring training in February 1966. Instead, both signed to appear in the movie Warning Shot, starring David Janssen, in case the holdout extended into the season. Additionally, Koufax had signed a book deal to write his autobiography, Koufax, with author Ed Linn which, according to Linn, the usually private star only agreed to do as a safety net.

The Dodgers began to wage a public relations campaign against their players and, as a result, press coverage of the holdout as well as public opinion was largely on the side of the owners and the establishment. In his 1966 autobiography, Koufax wrote that he was discouraged by the reception he and Drysdale got from a large segment of the fan base during the holdout:

It was astonishing to me to learn that there were a remarkably large number of American citizens who truly did not believe we had the moral right to quit rather than work at a salary we felt — rightly or wrongly — to be less than we deserved... Just take what the nice man wants to give you, get into your uniform, and go a fast 25 laps around the field.

In contrast to the front office, both players agreed to stay clear of the press or making statements during the holdout and to keep as low a profile as possible. Drysdale recalled in his autobiography that they would "add no fuel to the fire whatsoever".

According to Drysdale, former teammates such as Johnny Podres would call on occasion and urge the players to set aside their differences and come to spring training which they suspected was due to Bavasi putting them up to it. At one point, O'Malley threatened to trade the players when the suggestion came up that they might talk to other teams.

When the holdout began, O'Malley explained his opposition to negotiating with via a third party: "I admire the boys' strategy and we can't do without them, even for a little while. We're lacking too much. But we can't give in to them. There are too many agents hanging around Hollywood looking for clients." He hinted that other owners were also unnerved by the holdout and saw it as a test against the owners' stronghold on baseball at the time. O'Malley also said that, "Those two boys are splendid fellows, but once you sign two players as an entry, what is to stop the entire team from negotiating on a collective basis?"

=== End of holdout ===
Hayes, meanwhile, unearthed a state law which made it illegal to extend personal service contracts in California beyond seven years, a law which resulted from the case of De Havilland v. Warner Bros. Pictures; he began to prepare a lawsuit against the Dodgers and to challenge the reserve clause, later saying that if the pitchers had been successful in challenging baseball's reserve clause, they would have been "the Abraham Lincolns of the game." However, Dodgers owner Walter O'Malley was tipped off by film producer Melvin LeRoy about Hayes' findings. Hence, the team's front office softened their stance towards the pair.

Actor and former baseball player Chuck Connors helped arrange a meeting between Bavasi and the two pitchers. Koufax gave Drysdale the go-ahead to negotiate new deals on behalf of both of them, saying to his teammate, "If you're happy then I'm happy." At the end of the thirty-two day holdout, Koufax signed for $125,000 (equivalent to $1.24 million in 2025) and Drysdale for $110,000 (equivalent to $1,092,000 in 2025). The deal made Koufax the highest paid player in Major League Baseball for 1966.

When the end of the holdout and the signings were announced in a press conference at Dodger Stadium, the front office notably made it clear that the two pitchers were signed individually, were being paid different salaries, and that they were not represented by an agent. Upon signing with the Dodgers, Koufax jokingly remarked, "Thank god I don't have to act in that movie!" Drysdale, on his part, would later admit to being relieved as he had a wife and daughter to care for and couldn't afford to hold out indefinitely.

== Aftermath ==
The holdout and long layoff ended up badly affecting Drysdale's performance during the 1966 season. He went 13–16 on the year with an earned run average of 3.42, his worst since the Dodgers moved to Dodger Stadium. On the other hand, Koufax turned in what was arguably the best season of his career, leading both leagues in wins, ERA, and strikeouts, winning his third Triple Crown en route to a third unanimous Cy Young Award.

The Los Angeles Dodgers went on to win the pennant after a tight pennant race but lost the World Series in four straight against the Baltimore Orioles, with Drysdale losing Games 1 and 4 and Koufax losing Game 2 due to lack of offense and bad defensive play behind them.

Koufax announced his retirement a few weeks after the end of the World Series, citing the chronic pain in his pitching arm as the reason. Notably, he refused Buzzie Bavasi's request to delay his announcement in order to facilitate a few trade deals in favor of the Dodgers or at least wait until owner Walter O'Malley returned from the Dodgers' trip to Japan. As a result, during the press conference in the Beverly Wilshire Hotel, nobody from the Dodgers was present.

In a Sports Illustrated story from May 1967, Bavasi would brush off the holdout as nothing more than a publicity stunt, saying that "since one of the two was the greatest pitcher I've ever seen (and possibly the greatest anybody has ever seen), the gimmick worked." He also notably downplayed the pain in which Koufax had pitched with during the last years of his career: "Sandy did not suffer agonizing pain while he was pitching, and he never said he did, either." and criticized him for how he chose to retire.

== Legacy ==
The holdout is noted to be the first significant event in baseball's labor movement and the first time major league players had challenged the absolute stronghold the owners held in baseball at the time. That same year, trade unionist Marvin Miller used the Koufax–Drysdale holdout as an argument for collective bargaining while campaigning for players' votes during spring training; he would be soon be elected by the players as first executive director of the Major League Baseball Players Association.

In 1968, when the MLBPA was negotiating their first collective bargaining agreement, the owners, citing the joint holdout between Koufax and Drysdale, wanted protection against players teaming up to hold out. The union agreed on the condition that the owners would not do the same. The language which was signed off on would later be used to cite owners themselves for collusion in depressing free-agent salaries in the 1980s.

According to Donald Fehr, Miller would later credit the holdout as the "first key event" in the baseball's labour movement which began a decade long change that led to free agency being established in Major League Baseball. After the 32-day holdout ended, Arthur Daley of The New York Times described it as being "baseball's first collective bargaining agreement. There are aspects of unionism to it and no one in this sport of rugged individualists ever was confronted with such a thing before." Koufax himself would later describe his partnership with Drysdale as being "a very small union – just the two of us, Don and myself."

== See also ==
- Flood v. Kuhn – 1972 U.S. Supreme Court case in which MLB player and plaintiff Curt Flood challenged the reserve clause.
- Seitz decision – 1975 ruling by arbitrator Peter Seitz which effectively nullified the reserve clause and ushered in the era of free agency.
