= Nancy Gates =

American actress (1926–2019)

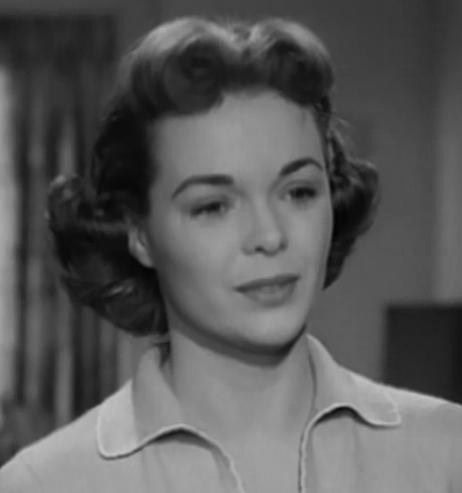
- Gates in the film Suddenly (1954)
- Born: Nancy Jane Gates; February 1, 1926; Dallas, Texas, U.S.
- Died: March 24, 2019 (aged 93); Los Angeles, California, U.S.
- Occupations: Film, television actress
- Years active: 1942–1969
- Spouse: J. William Hayes (m. 1948; died 1992)
- Children: 4, including Chip Hayes

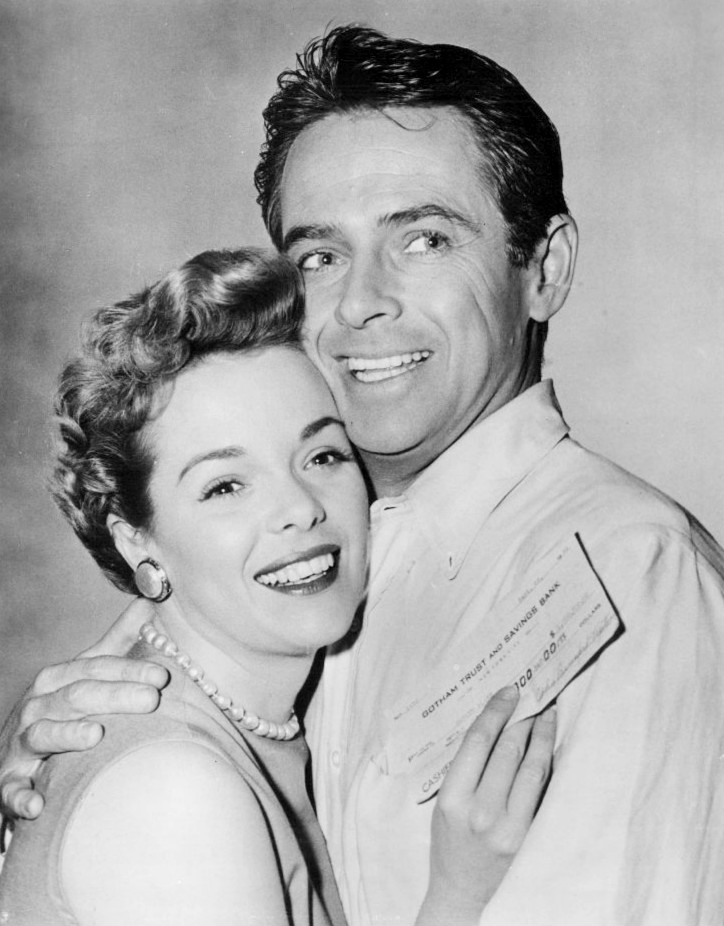
Nancy Gates and John Hudson on TV's The Millionaire (1955)

Nancy Gates (February 1, 1926 – March 24, 2019) was an American film and television actress.

== Early life ==
Gates was born to Mr. and Mrs. Virgil Gates, in Dallas, Texas. She grew up in nearby Denton, and was described as "a child wonder." A 1932 newspaper article about an Easter program at Robert E. Lee School noted, "Nancy Gates, presenting a soft-shoe number, will open the style show." That same year, she had a part in the Denton Kiddie Revue.

In 1935, she appeared in the production A Kiss for Cinderella, which starred Brenda Marshall, and a minstrel show that included Ann Sheridan, both of whom were from Denton. She was in show business before she finished high school, having her own radio program on WFAA in Dallas for two years while she was a student at Denton High School, from which she graduated. Musically oriented, Gates was featured as a singer in a 1942 concert by the North Texas State Teachers College stage band.

Gates attended the University of Oklahoma for one year before getting married.

== Career ==
=== Film ===
Gates entered acting at a young age, receiving a contract with RKO at the age of 15, which required court approval because of her status as a minor. Orson Welles screen-tested her for a role in the 1942 film The Magnificent Ambersons. Although she did not get the role, which went to Anne Baxter, the test paved the way for her future entry into film. That same year she had her first credited role, in The Great Gildersleeve. In 1943 she went on contract with RKO, her first film with them being Hitler's Children that same year. She began receiving roles in mostly B-movies, many of which were westerns or sci-fi, eventually receiving lead roles as the heroine. In 1948 she starred opposite Eddie Dean in Check Your Guns, and in 1949 she played alongside Jim Bannon, Marin Sais, and Emmett Lynn in one installment of the Red Ryder film series, titled Roll, Thunder, Roll!. She would star in several other films over the next ten years, especially in westerns such as Comanche Station (1959), and in support roles, most notably in two Frank Sinatra films, Some Came Running and Suddenly.

In total Gates starred or co-starred in 34 films and serials. She retired from acting in 1969.

=== Radio ===
Gates made her radio debut on the September 29, 1941, broadcast of CBS Radio's The Orson Welles Show, playing opposite Welles in an adaptation of Sherwood Anderson's short story "I'm a Fool". She performed in the soap opera Masquerade on NBC in 1946–1947. A February 21, 1944, newspaper article noted that Gates would "appear in a series of air programs for the RKO Studios beginning Feb. 28." In 1951, she starred on Screen Director's Playhouse opposite William Holden in Remember the Night and on Lux Radio Theatre in a supporting role in Sunset Boulevard.

=== Television ===
Gates made a total of 55 television appearances. She made two appearances on the television series Maverick, three appearances on Perry Mason, three on Wagon Train, six on Lux Video Theater, and two on Alfred Hitchcock Presents. In 1957 she had a memorable role as defendant Martha Bradford in the Perry Mason episode, "The Case of the Crooked Candle"; then in 1964 she was cast in the role of the defendant, Mary Douglas, in "The Case of the Woeful Widower". In 1965 she again played the role of Perry's client, this time as Claire Armstrong, the title character, in "The Case of the Candy Queen". In 1958; she appeared on Trackdown as Ellen Hackett in "Killer Takes All".

Her other TV appearances included The Third Man, Science Fiction Theater, Bonanza, Studio 57, The Lineup, Bus Stop, The Pepsi-Cola Playhouse, Your Play Time, Riverboat, General Electric Theater, Rawhide, Letter to Loretta, Laramie, The Whistler,The Mod Squad, Dick Powell's Zane Grey Theatre, Bourbon Street Beat, The Special for Women with Dinah Shore, The Danny Thomas Hour, Damon Runyon Theater, Kentucky Jones and Gunsmoke.

== Personal life and death ==
Gates retired in 1969 to be closer to her family. She was married to Hollywood attorney and business manager J. William Hayes, whom she met when he was a commercial pilot and she was a passenger on one of his flights. They had four children, twin daughters Cindy and Cathy, and sons who became Hollywood producers, Jeffrey M. Hayes and Chip Hayes. J. William Hayes died in 1992. Gates died in March 2019 at the age of 93.

== Filmography ==
- The Tuttles of Tahiti (1942) – Tupa's Daughter – Age 14 (uncredited)
- The Magnificent Ambersons (1942) – Girl (uncredited)
- The Great Gildersleeve (1942) – Marjorie Forrester
- Hitler's Children (1943) – Brenda
- This Land Is Mine (1943) – Julie Grant
- Gildersleeve's Bad Day (1943) – Margie Forrester
- A Night of Adventure (1944) – Connie Matthews
- Bride by Mistake (1944) – Jane Mason
- The Master Race (1944) – Nina
- Nevada (1944) – Hattie Ide
- The Spanish Main (1945) – Lupita
- Cheyenne Takes Over (1947) – Fay Wilkins
- Check Your Guns (1948) – Cathy Jordan
- Roll, Thunder, Roll! (1949) – Carol Loomis
- The Greatest Show on Earth (1952) – Spectator (uncredited)
- At Sword's Point (1952) – Princess Henriette
- The Atomic City (1952) – Ellen Haskell
- The Member of the Wedding (1952) – Janice
- Target Hong Kong (1953) – Ming Shan
- Torch Song (1953) – Celia Stewart
- Hell's Half Acre (1954) – Sally Lee
- Suddenly (1954) – Ellen Benson
- Masterson of Kansas (1954) – Amy Merrick
- Stranger on Horseback (1955) – Caroline Webb
- Top of the World (1955) – Lieutenant Mary Ross
- No Man's Woman (1955) – Louise Nelson
- Alfred Hitchcock Presents (1955) (Season 1 Episode 6: "Salvage") – Lois Williams
- Alfred Hitchcock Presents (1956) (Season 1 Episode 28: "Portrait of Jocelyn") – Debbie Halliday
- The Bottom of the Bottle (1956) – Mildred Martin
- World Without End (1956) – Garnet
- Wetbacks (1956) – Sally Parker
- Magnificent Roughnecks (1956) – Jane Rivers
- The Search for Bridey Murphy (1956) – Hazel Bernstein
- Death of a Scoundrel (1956) – Stephanie North
- The Brass Legend (1956) – Linda Gipson
- The Rawhide Trail (1958) – Marsha Collins
- Some Came Running (1958) – Edith Barclay
- The Gunfight at Dodge City (1959) – Lily, Lady Gay Saloon Owner
- Comanche Station (1960) – Nancy Lowe
