= John Wilder =

John Wilder may refer to:

- John T. Wilder (1830–1917), American soldier and politician
- John Shelton Wilder (1921–2010), American politician, lieutenant governor of Tennessee
- John Wilder (producer) (born 1936), American producer and former actor
