= Westward Bound =

Westward Bound may refer to:

- Westward Bound (1930 film), American western film
- Westward Bound (1944 film), American western film
