= Death Valley Rangers =

1943 film directed by Robert Emmett Tansey

- Directed by: Robert Emmett Tansey
- Written by: Elizabeth Beecher; Robert Emmett Tansey; Frances Kavanaugh
- Produced by: Robert Emmett Tansey
- Starring: Ken Maynard; Hoot Gibson; Bob Steele
- Cinematography: Edward A. Kull
- Edited by: Carl Pierson
- Music by: Frank Sanucci
- Production company: Monogram Pictures
- Distributed by: Monogram Pictures
- Release date: December 3, 1943
- Running time: 59 minutes
- Country: United States
- Language: English

Death Valley Rangers is a 1943 American Western film directed by Robert Emmett Tansey and starring Ken Maynard, Hoot Gibson, and Bob Steele.

== Cast ==
- Ken Maynard as Ken Maynard
- Hoot Gibson as Hoot Gibson
- Bob Steele as Bob Steele
- Weldon Heyburn as James Kirk
- Linda Brent as Lorna Ainsley
- Bryant Washburn as Edwards
- Glenn Strange as The Marshal
- Forrest Taylor as Captain Ainsley
- Karl Hackett as Doc Thorne
- Lee Roberts as Ranger Michaels
- Charles King as Blackie - Henchman
- George Chesebro as Red - Henchman
- John Bridges as Stage Driver Cal Wilkins
- Al Ferguson as Ross - Henchman
- Steve Clark as Hank - Stage Driver
- Wally West as Wally - Stage Guard

== Bibliography ==
- Martin, Len D. The Allied Artists Checklist: The Feature Films and Short Subjects of Allied Artists Pictures Corporation, 1947-1978. McFarland & Company, 1993.
