= J. William Hayes =

American entertainment lawyer

- Born: November 26, 1921; Memphis, Tennessee, U.S.
- Died: March 30, 1992 (aged 70); Los Angeles, California, U.S.
- Education: University of Oklahoma
- Occupation: Lawyer
- Known for: Represented Sandy Koufax and Don Drysdale during their joint holdout in 1966
- Spouse: Nancy Gates (m. 1948)
- Children: 4, including Chip

James William Hayes (November 26, 1921 – March 30, 1992) was an American entertainment lawyer and business manager.

Born in Memphis, Tennessee, Hayes was raised and educated in Oklahoma. To friends and family, he was affectionately called "Bill". Before he became a lawyer, Hayes worked as a commercial pilot for American Airlines.

Hayes is best known for his role in the Koufax–Drysdale holdout. At the time, he was the business manager for Sandy Koufax, star pitcher of the Los Angeles Dodgers. When he and teammate Don Drysdale decided to hold out together, Koufax asked Hayes to become their agent and negotiate on their behalf.

During the holdout, Hayes uncovered a state law that made it illegal to extend personal service contracts in California beyond seven years, a law which resulted from the case of De Havilland v. Warner Bros. Pictures. He began preparing for a lawsuit challenging the reserve clause but was unable to take it to court because the Dodgers discovered the possibility of the lawsuit and decided to soften their stance towards Koufax and Drysdale. The holdout would end soon afterwards.

A few months later, Hayes sat next to Koufax during the press conference where the pitcher announced his surprise retirement from baseball.

Additionally, Hayes was also known for founding "Hayes & Hume", an entertainment law firm in Los Angeles, with his partner Richard Hume. The firm represented numerous well-known producers, writers, directors, studio executives, and performing artists. Notable people included: producers Aaron Spelling, David Gerber, and David Wolper; and actors Robert Stack and Lloyd Bridges.

He was married to actress Nancy Gates, whom he met when he was a commercial pilot, and she was a passenger on one of his flights. They had four children: twin daughters Cynthia and Cathleen, and sons Jeffrey and Chip Hayes, who became Hollywood producers.

Hayes died of a heart attack at his home in West Los Angeles in 1992, aged 70. He was survived by his wife, four children, and two grandchildren.
