= Should a Girl Marry? =

Should a Girl Marry? may refer to:

- Should a Girl Marry? (1928 film), a 1928 American silent crime film directed by Scott Pembroke.
- Should a Girl Marry? (1939 film), a 1939 American crime film directed by Lambert Hillyer.
