= The Law Rides Again =

1943 film by Alan James

- Film poster
- Directed by: Alan James
- Screenplay by: Robert Emmett Tansey (story) (uncredited); Frances Kavanaugh
- Produced by: Robert Emmett Tansey
- Starring: Ken Maynard; Hoot Gibson; Jack La Rue; Betty Miles
- Cinematography: Marcel Le Picard
- Edited by: Carl Pierson
- Music by: Frank Sanucci
- Production company: Monogram Pictures
- Release date: October 12, 1943
- Running time: 58 minutes
- Country: United States
- Language: English

The Law Rides Again is a 1943 American Western film, directed by Alan James and starring Ken Maynard and Hoot Gibson.

== Cast ==
- Ken Maynard as U.S. Marshal Ken Maynard
- Hoot Gibson as U.S. Marshal Hoot Gibson
- Jack La Rue as Duke Dillon
- Betty Miles as Betty Conway
- Emmett Lynn as Eagle-Eye the Scout
- Kenneth Harlan as John Hampton, Indian Agent
- Chief Thundercloud as Thundercloud
- Chief Many Treaties as Chief Barking Fox
- Bryant Washburn as Commissioner Lee
- Fred Hoose as Hank, Stage driver
- Kenne Duncan as Sheriff Jeff
- Roy Brent as Marshal with Dillon
- John Bridges as Jess, Hotel Thug
- John Merton as Henchman Spike
- Hank Bell as Tex, Hampton Henchman
- Charles Murray Jr. as Henchman
- Steve Clark as Pete Conway, Betty's Father
- Budd Buster as Commissioner's aide
