= Robert Cabal =

American film and television actor

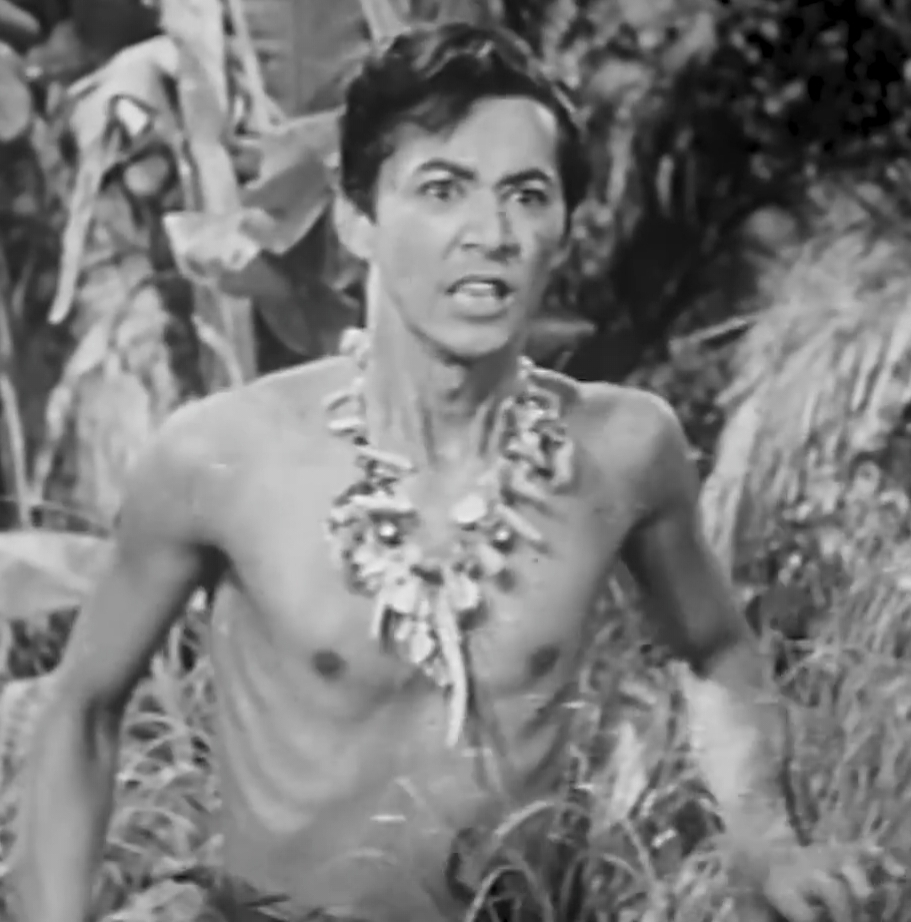
- Cabal in Forbidden Jungle (1950)
- Born: Harold Christopher McColgan; April 7, 1917; Honolulu, Hawaii, U.S.
- Died: May 11, 2004 (aged 87); Los Angeles, California, U.S.
- Occupations: Film and television actor
- Years active: 1947–1967

Robert Cabal (April 7, 1917 – May 11, 2004), born Harold Ching or Harold Christopher McColgan, was an American film and television actor whose work was featured in 46 films and television series from 1947 to 1967.

Cabal's unique facial features enabled him to play a wide range of ethnic types during his career. His longest recurring role was "Hey Soos" Patines, the horse wrangler of the cattle drive in the CBS TV series Rawhide.

== Personal life ==
Born in Honolulu, Hawaii, in 1917, Cabal is said to be the first of Clement Hiram and Nina (née Medeiros) McColgan's two sons. His recorded parents were unmarried at the time of his birth, and were 16 and 18 years old, respectively. Cabal's purported parents married in 1933, 16 years after his birth. However, Cabal's mother had married William N. F. Ching on March 8, 1916. Ching's 1917 World War I US draft registration lists "a four month old infant". The date aligns with Cabal's birthdate. Cabal is listed as three-year old "Harold Ching" in the 1920 US Census, which also shows his parents "William" and "Nina Ching", as well as his brother "Grover".

On July 3, 1935, Clement H. McColgan petitioned to adopt "Harold Christopher Ching, 18 (years old)" and "Grover Samuel Ching, 16 (years old)". A petition to change the brothers' names was filed on July 9, 1935. On July 25, 1935, Cabal's name was legally changed from "Harold C. Ching" to "Harold C. McColgan".

On April 6, 1963 Cabal's mother signed a Territory of Hawaii Certificate of Live Birth stating that Clement Hiram McColgan and Nina Medeiros were his parents.

Cabal attended St. Louis College, a private, all-boys, Catholic high school in Honolulu, Hawaii. He graduated on June 17, 1935.

Cabal died on May 11, 2004 and was buried in the Hollywood Forever Cemetery in Los Angeles, California on May 26, 2004.

== Acting career ==
While a junior attending St. Louis College in 1934, Cabal appeared in the high school play What A Night, described as a "comedy drama of mystery".

He moved from Hawaii to California to pursue acting. Without money for drama school, he taught himself to type and earned his tuition typing scripts for the school.

=== Stage ===
Cabal began his professional acting career on the stage. "I got a tip about a part in a road company of Jack Kirkland's play, Suds In Your Eye. We toured the country six months before returning to Hollywood".

=== Film and television ===
Cabal appeared in 19 movies from 1947 through 1960. His uncredited acting debut was in Universal Studios' film noir movie Ride the Pink Horse.

Cabal remembered his "jungle days" during the start of his movie career, saying, "I played in Forbidden Jungle and lots of others. About the only dialogue I spoke was a series of grunts. It got so that today I can say almost anything by a grunt!"

In 1952, after a wide search in the Los Angeles Hispanic community where 100 actors were auditioned and nine were screen tested, Cabal was instead chosen to play the teenaged Mexican bandit Joaquin Murietta as a "very cheerful cutthroat" in the Randolph Scott movie The Man Behind the Gun. After the film was released in 1952, he was invited to lecture about Murietta at the University of Mexico. A 1953 review said, "Robert Cabal displays a lot of talent in a small role". Another review said Cabal was "a standout among the actors".

In 1953, Cabal was cast in his first romantic role in the film noir movie Hell's Island. He said, "I die in the end. Ah, but what a death!"

In 1954, he sought financing to produce a biographic film of Joaquin Murietta's life. He explained, "I want to show the true story of the man. He was actually a very sensitive individual, but certain influences and pressures moulded him into a killer. The true Murietta story has never been told". Fellow actor and film producer John Payne, who had filmed Hell's Island with Cabal, was said to be interested in the proposed production.

=== Stunt work ===
Cabal performed his own stunt work. In 1955 he discussed the repeated physical injuries he had suffered during filming. He claimed that while filming Mara Maru, Errol Flynn slapped him so hard he was sent sailing "clear across the room" 22 times. In another film he was to "drown in quicksand" (made from cork, dirt, grease and water). The crew missed a cue to stop, Cabal was completely submerged, and had to be rescued and resuscitated. In the film Hell's Island he was thrown down a flight of stairs by hoodlums. The painful scene had to be filmed four times.

He thought the problem stemmed from his physical size, saying, "Writers seem to think the idea of a little guy challenging a giant has dramatic potential. It's the old Goliath and David, except that I don't frequently win my fights as did David".

=== Acting range ===
A 1955 news article said, "Robert Cabal is one actor who's happy nobody ever recognizes him. His anonymity is his fortune... (he) owes his newly found affluence to the fact that without any makeup at all he can play any national type from Irish to Indian". Cabal explained, "My eyes are very adaptable. They can look Oriental with no make-up. Yet they are not slanted, so I could play an Italian or Latin type with equal ease".

During the first eight years of his career he portrayed Mary Murphy's Mexican houseboy Miguel in Hell's Island, a Portuguese boy on The Ezio Pinza Show, a Filipino in Mara Maru, a Burmese man in Escape to Burma, an Arab on the Biff Baker, U.S.A. TV series, and an East Indian Hindu named "Hey-Joe" in an episode of the syndicated Passport to Danger TV show.

Cabal also played a Polynesian in the Four Star Playhouse TV series, a gypsy on TV's Hopalong Cassidy, an American Indian on The Cisco Kid, and an Apache in the Burt Lancaster film Apache.

=== Rawhide ===
Cabal is best known for his multi-season role on the TV series Rawhide. In 115 episodes from 1959 to 1965, he played "Hey Soos" Patines, the remuda wrangler who cared for the cattle drive's horses.

== Selected filmography ==
Year	Title	Role	Notes
1950	Forbidden Jungle	Tawa	
1952	Mara Maru	Manuelo	
1953	The Man Behind the Gun	Joaquin Murietta	
1956	Around the World in 80 Days	Elephant Driver/Guide	

== Selected television ==
Year	Title	Role	Notes
1958	Have Gun - Will Travel	Pvt. Espinosa	Episode "The Solid Gold Patrol"
1959–1965	Rawhide	"Hey Soos" Patines	115 episodes
1965	The Big Valley	Luis	Episode "Winner Lose All"
