= Stranger on Horseback =

1955 film by Jacques Tourneur

- Theatrical release poster
- Directed by: Jacques Tourneur
- Screenplay by: Herb Meadow; Don Martin
- Story by: Louis L'Amour
- Produced by: Robert Goldstein
- Starring: Joel McCrea
- Cinematography: Ray Rennahan
- Edited by: William B. Murphy
- Music by: Paul Dunlap
- Production companies: Leonard Goldstein Productions; Robert Goldstein Productions
- Distributed by: United Artists
- Release date: March 23, 1955
- Running time: 66 minutes
- Country: United States
- Language: English

Stranger on Horseback is a 1955 American Anscocolor Western film directed by Jacques Tourneur and starring Joel McCrea. The screenplay is based on a story by Louis L'Amour. It was filmed in and around Sedona, AZ, and on Gene Autry’s Melody Ranch in Placerita Canyon, Newhall, CA.

== Plot ==
Rick Thorne, a circuit judge, rides into Bannerman and discovers everything in town is controlled by rich rancher Josiah Bannerman and his kin. He meets sheriff Nat Bell and district attorney Buck Streeter and asks why Bannerman's arrogant son, Tom, got away with killing a man without an arrest or trial.

Offered no assistance, Thorne stands up to Tom and then jails him. He becomes acquainted with Bannerman's beautiful niece, Amy Lee, who is attracted to Thorne but doubts her cousin Tom is a cold-blooded killer.

Thorne finds allies in Caroline and Vince Webb, who own a gun shop and are willing to testify with evidence against Tom in court. Thorne realizes he needs to sneak Tom and the Webbs to a different town if he's to get a fair trial. Bannerman and his men pursue them, and Amy Lee watches as Tom deliberately causes Vince Webb's death. In time, Thorne gets the prisoner to the next town safely, and Amy Lee goes to court to back him up.

== Cast ==
- Joel McCrea as Judge Richard 'Rick' Thorne
- Miroslava as Amy Lee Bannerman
- Kevin McCarthy as Tom Bannerman
- John McIntire as Josiah Bannerman
- John Carradine as Col. Buck Streeter
- Nancy Gates as Caroline Webb
- Emile Meyer as Sheriff Nat Bell
- Robert Cornthwaite as Arnold Hammer
- Jaclynne Greene as Paula Morrison
- Walter Baldwin as Vince Webb
- Emmett Lynn as Barfly
- Roy Roberts as Sam Kettering
- George Keymas as Bannerman's Henchman
- Lane Bradford as Kettering Henchman (uncredited)
- Dabbs Greer as Hotel Clerk (uncredited)
- Frank Hagney as Bartender (uncredited)

This was Miroslava's last Hollywood film; she committed suicide a few weeks before the film was released.

== See also ==
- List of American films of 1955
