= Five Guns to Tombstone =

1960 film by Edward L. Cahn

- Directed by: Edward L. Cahn
- Screenplay by: Richard Schayer; Jack De Witt
- Story by: Arthur E. Orloff (as Arthur Orloff)
- Produced by: Robert E. Kent
- Starring: James Brown; John Wilder; Walter Coy; Robert Karnes; Della Sharman
- Cinematography: Maury Gertsman
- Edited by: Bernard Small
- Music by: Paul Sawtell; Bert Shefter
- Production companies: Zenith Pictures; Robert E. Kent Productions
- Distributed by: United Artists
- Release date: 1960
- Running time: 71 minutes
- Country: United States
- Language: English

Five Guns to Tombstone is a 1960 American Western film directed by Edward L. Cahn and starring James Brown, John Wilder, Walter Coy, Robert Karnes and Della Sharman.

== Plot ==
Young outlaw Billy Wade, determined to reform, is roped into a robbery by rich businessman George Landon then framed for it. Landon springs Billy's brother Matt from prison, on the condition he get Billy to go along with the theft. During a struggle for a gun Matt is accidentally killed, and his teenaged son Ted and others mistakenly believe Billy killed him in cold blood. Billy pretends to help bandit Ike Garvey but ultimately assists in his capture, earning Ted's forgiveness.

== Cast ==
- James Brown as Billy Wade
- John Wilder as Ted Wade
- Walter Coy as Ike Garvey
- Robert Karnes as Matt Wade
- Della Sharman as Arlene
- Gregg Palmer as Mel Dixon
- Willis Bouchey as George Landon
- Joe Haworth as Hoke
- Quentin Sondergaard as Hank
- Boyd "Red" Morgan as Hoagie (as Boyd Morgan)
- Jon Locke as Rusty Kolloway
- John Eldredge as Endicott

== Production ==
The film's plotline and lines duplicate those of an earlier Edward Small production, Gun Belt (1953).
