= Cowboy and the Prizefighter =

- Theatrical release poster
- Directed by: Lewis D. Collins
- Screenplay by: Jerry Thomas
- Based on: Red Ryder by: Fred Harman; Stephen Slesinger
- Produced by: Jerry Thomas
- Starring: Jim Bannon; Don Reynolds; Emmett Lynn; Marin Sais; Don Haggerty; Karen Randle
- Cinematography: Gilbert Warrenton
- Edited by: Joseph Gluck
- Music by: Raoul Kraushaar
- Production company: Jack Schwarz Productions
- Distributed by: Eagle-Lion Films
- Release date: December 15, 1949
- Running time: 59 minutes
- Country: United States
- Language: English

Cowboy and the Prizefighter is a 1949 American Western Cinecolor film directed by Lewis D. Collins and written by Jerry Thomas. It is based on the comic strip Red Ryder by Fred Harman and Stephen Slesinger. The film stars Jim Bannon, Don Reynolds, Emmett Lynn, Marin Sais, Don Haggerty and Karen Randle. The film was released on December 15, 1949, by Eagle-Lion Films.

== Plot ==
Red Ryder's life is saved by Steve Stevenson who wishes to avenge the death of his father who he believes was murdered. His father's death involved a scheme whereas a local challenger would be challenged by a travelling prizefighter with foul means used to obtain money from the bets. When the same scheme comes to Red Ryder's town, local villains use the fight to not only obtain money from betting, but to be used as a cover for a robbery.

== Cast ==
- Jim Bannon as Red Ryder
- Don Reynolds as Little Beaver
- Emmett Lynn as Buckskin Blodgett
- Marin Sais as The Duchess
- Don Haggerty as Steve Stevenson
- Karen Randle as Sue Evans
- John Hart as Mark Palmer
- Lane Bradford as Deuce Sampson
- Marshall Reed as Bart Osborne
- Forrest Taylor as Miles Stevenson
- Frank Ellis as Sheriff
- Bud Osborne as Ernie
- Lou Nova as Bull Mason
