= Weldon Heyburn =

American actor (1903–1951)

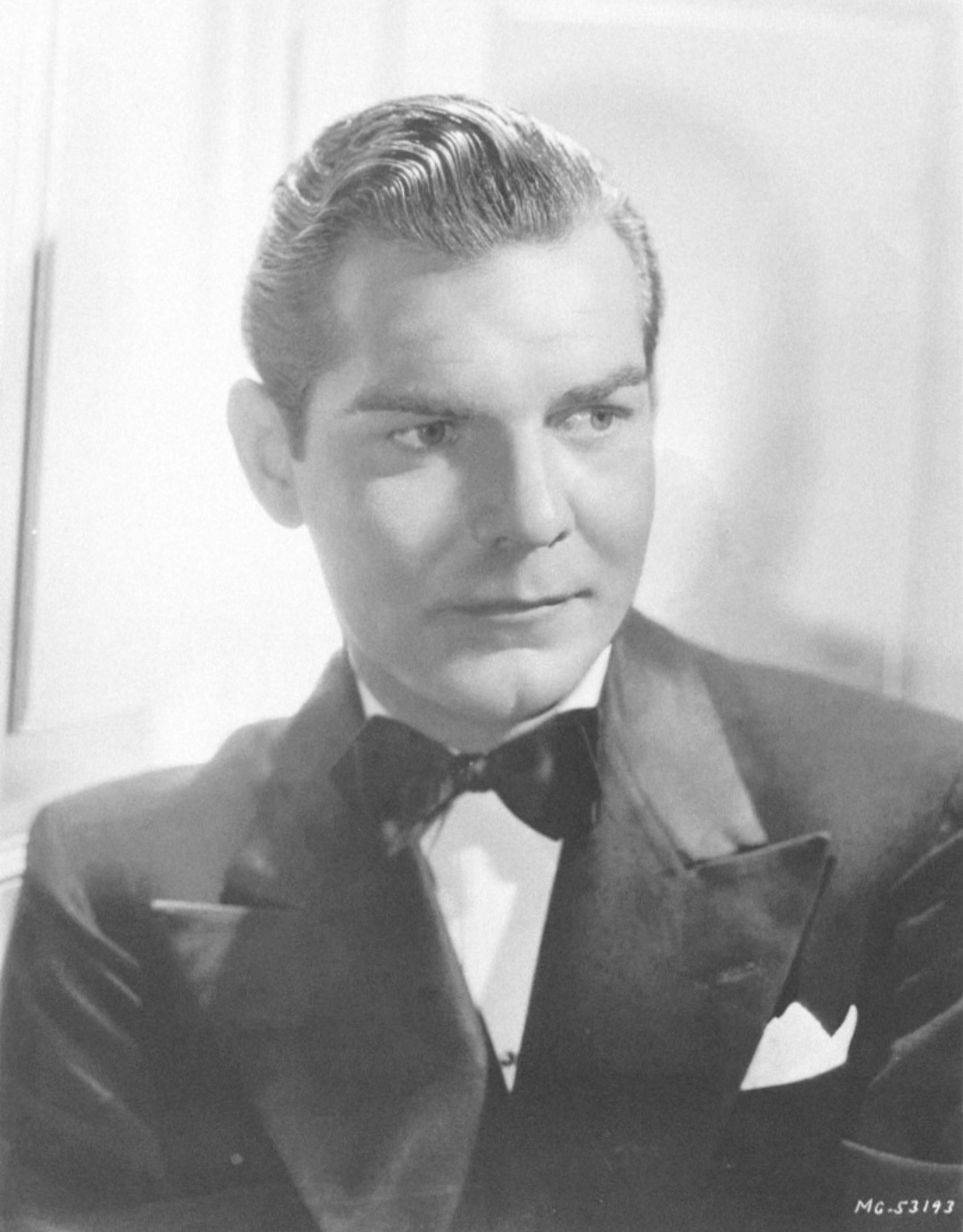
- Heyburn in 1936
- Born: Weldon Heyburn Franks; September 19, 1903; Washington, D.C., U.S. (uncertain)
- Died: May 18, 1951 (aged 47); Los Angeles, California, U.S.
- Resting place: Arlington National Cemetery
- Occupation: Actor
- Years active: 1924–1950
- Spouses: Phyllis Connard (m. 1924; div. 1926) Greta Nissen (m. 1932; ann. 1936) Jane Eichelberger (m. 1936; div. 1939) Virginia Maggard (m. 1939; div. 1941)

Weldon Heyburn (born Weldon Heyburn Franks; September 19, 1903 – May 18, 1951) was an American character actor.

== Early years ==
The son of Marie Pierce and United States Army Col. Wyatt G. Franks, Heyburn was most likely born in Washington, D.C. although other sources indicate Selma, Alabama or Delaware City, Delaware as the place of birth.

Heyburn attended Central High School and Emerson Institute (both in Washington, D.C.), before attending the University of Alabama.

In the 1920s, Heyburn represented himself as "the son of Charles Heyburn, judge of the United States Supreme Court" and "the nephew of Weldon Heyburn, the late Senator of Iowa." The senator's niece denied any kinship, saying in 1925 that Heyburn was "an impostor if he persists in his claims", with other members of the family supporting her assertion.

== Stage ==
In the mid-1920s, Heyburn was the "leading man in a Lansing, Mich., stock company." His Broadway credits include The Mystery Man (1927), Troyka (1930), Good Men and True (1935), and I Want a Policeman (1936).

== Film ==
In 1931, Heyburn ventured into film. An August 31, 1931, newspaper article reported, "After playing leading man for such stage stars as Jeanne Eagels, Lenore Ulric and Mary Boland, he has given up the stage to become a feature screen player like his roommate and fellow gridiron player, John Mack Brown."

== Military service ==
During World War II, Heyburn served in the U.S. Army Signal Corps.

== Personal life ==
In 1924, Heyburn married actress Phyllis Connard. They divorced October 15, 1926.

Heyburn married Norwegian star Greta Nissen March 30, 1932, in Tijuana, Mexico. They met when they appeared together in The Silent Witness (1932), she as the female lead, he as an unbilled player. On October 19, 1935, Nissen went to court to have the marriage annulled, "charging their marriage ... was illegal and violated legal witness and residence requirements." The annulment was granted April 30, 1936.

Heyburn married Jane Eichelberger ("prominent socially in New York and Cleveland") on May 5, 1936, at Heyburn's home in Brentwood, California. They divorced in 1939. His last marriage was to socialite Virginia Maggard in September 1939. He was divorced when he enlisted in the U.S. Army in May 1942.

He also had relationships with actress Grace Brinkley and debutante Dorothy McCallam.

== Death ==
A drinking problem effectively ended his career in the mid-1940s and his health rapidly declined. He entered the Veterans Administration Hospital in Los Angeles suffering from cancer of the mouth, right adrenal and kidney and died there of pneumonia. He was interred in Arlington National Cemetery in Arlington County, Virginia.

== Partial filmography ==
Heyburn appeared in about 65 films from 1930 through 1950. They include:

- The Last Parade (1931) - Henchman (uncredited)
- The Silent Witness (1932) - Carl Blake
- Careless Lady (1932) - Jud Carey
- Chandu the Magician (1932) - Abdulah
- Call Her Savage (1932) - Ronasa
- West of Singapore (1933) - Dan Manton
- Hired Wife (1934) - Kent Johns
- Convention Girl (1935) - Bill Bradley
- Dynamite Delaney (1936) - 'Dynamite' Delaney
- Speed (1936) - Frank Lawson
- Git Along Little Dogie (1937) - George Wilkins
- The 13th Man (1937) - Swifty Taylor
- Sea Racketeers (1937) - Chief Bos'n Mate Jim Wilson
- Atlantic Flight (1937) - Bill Edwards
- Every Day's a Holiday (1937) - Guest at Party (uncredited)
- Saleslady (1938) - Bob Spencer
- Crime School (1938) - Cooper
- The Mysterious Rider (1938) - Jack Bellounds
- Panama Patrol (1939) - Lt. Murdock
- Should a Girl Marry? (1939) - Harry Gilbert
- Fugitive at Large (1939) - Corrick
- Emergency Squad (1940) - Lennie - Squad Member with Newspaper (uncredited)
- Women Without Names (1940) - Guard (uncredited)
- North West Mounted Police (1940) - Constable Cameron (uncredited)
- The Trail Blazers (1940) - Jeff Bradley
- Flight from Destiny (1941) - Brooks
- The Round Up (1941) - 'Cheyenne'
- In Old Colorado (1941) - Blackie Reed
- Redhead (1941) - Winston
- Caught in the Draft (1941) - Sergeant at Examining Depot (uncredited)
- Criminals Within (1941) - Sgt. Blake (uncredited)
- Stick to Your Guns (1941) - Henchman Gila
- Jungle Man (1941) - Bruce Kellogg
- They Died with Their Boots On (1941) - Staff Officer (uncredited)
- Steel Against the Sky (1941) - Minor Role (scenes deleted)
- You're in the Army Now (1941) - Sergeant of the Guard (uncredited)
- Code of the Outlaw (1942) - Pop Hardin
- Rock River Renegades (1942) - Jim Dawson a.k.a. Phil Sanford
- Blazing Guns (1943) - Henchman Vic
- Overland Mail Robbery (1943) - John Patterson
- Death Valley Manhunt (1943) - Richard Quinn
- Death Valley Rangers (1943) - James Kirk
- Westward Bound (1944) - Albert Lane
- My Best Gal (1944) - (uncredited)
- The Chinese Cat (1944) - Det. Harvey Dennis
- Man from Frisco (1944) - Man in Trailer (uncredited)
- The Yellow Rose of Texas (1944) - Charley Goss
- Bordertown Trail (1944) - New Orleans
- When Strangers Marry (1944) - Bill - Police Sergeant (uncredited) (unbilled)
- Code of the Prairie (1944) - Jess Wyatt
- The Princess and the Pirate (1944) - Soldier at the Palace (uncredited)
- Here Come the Waves (1944) - Civilian (uncredited)
- Incendiary Blonde (1945) - Shill at Party for Louella Parsons (uncredited)
- Frontier Gunlaw (1946) - Matt Edwards
- A Southern Yankee (1948) - Confederate Officer (uncredited)
- Alias Nick Beal (1949) - Minor Role (uncredited)
- Samson and Delilah (1949) - Temple Spectator (uncredited)
- Perfect Strangers (1950) - Man Resisting Jury Duty (uncredited)
- The Damned Don't Cry (1950) - Robert - The Butler (uncredited)
- The Great Jewel Robber (1950) - Captain of the Guards (uncredited) (final film role)
