= Tumbleweed Trail =

1946 film directed by Robert Emmett Tansey

- Theatrical release poster
- Directed by: Robert Emmett Tansey
- Screenplay by: Frances Kavanaugh
- Produced by: Robert Emmett Tansey
- Starring: Eddie Dean; Roscoe Ates; Shirley Patterson; Johnny McGovern; Bob Duncan; Ted Adams; Jack O'Shea; Kermit Maynard; William Fawcett
- Cinematography: Ernest Miller
- Edited by: Hugh Winn
- Production company: Producers Releasing Corporation
- Distributed by: Producers Releasing Corporation
- Release date: July 10, 1946
- Running time: 57 minutes
- Country: United States
- Language: English

Tumbleweed Trail is a 1946 American Western film directed by Robert Emmett Tansey and written by Frances Kavanaugh. The film stars Eddie Dean, Roscoe Ates, Shirley Patterson, Johnny McGovern, Bob Duncan, Ted Adams, Jack O'Shea, Kermit Maynard and William Fawcett. The film was released on July 10, 1946, by Producers Releasing Corporation.

== Cast ==
- Eddie Dean as Eddie Dean
- Roscoe Ates as Soapy Jones
- Shirley Patterson as Robin Ryan
- Johnny McGovern as Freckles Ryan
- Bob Duncan as Brad Barton
- Ted Adams as Alton Small
- Jack O'Shea as Gringo
- Kermit Maynard as Bill Ryan
- William Fawcett as Judge Town
- Flash as Eddie's Horse
