= Holdout (sports) =

Professional sports term

In professional sports, a holdout (also written as hold out) occurs when a player fails to report to their team—usually before the start of a season—or fails to perform the services outlined in the terms of their contract. Players holdout for various reasons, however the desired outcome is usually to renegotiate their contract to more favorable terms. Players have also failed to report to a team after being drafted out of college, usually because they do not want to play for that team or want to play another sport. Although a player in this scenario has not signed a contract, they are usually considered a holdout because the team that drafted them secures exclusive rights to sign them to contract. A famous example of this was the Tampa Bay Buccaneers drafting Bo Jackson with the first pick of the 1986 NFL draft; Jackson did not report to the team because he wanted to pursue a career as a baseball player. The length of a holdout can range from just a few days to an entire season, or even indefinitely. Some players have utilized just the threat of a holdout to try to gain leverage in contract negotiations.

== Motivation ==
- Contract holdouts can come from the player wanting more money, to the player wanting to be traded from their certain club for various amounts of reasons. Holdouts in major sports are starting to become increasingly popular in todays day in age.
- Many players usually go into a contract holdout when they are in a disagreement with their current team, and either want a change of team or more money to continue playing with their club
- Many believe that players holding out seem greedy, selfish and unloyal to their team.

== Notable examples ==
=== Major League Baseball ===
- Mickey Mantle, star centerfielder for the New York Yankees, hit .304 batting average and led the league in home runs, runs scored, and walks during his 1958 season. He also led the Yankees to another World Series title. The Yankees, however, declined Mantle's request for a contract raise to $85,000, citing that his batting average was almost 61 points lower than the year before. Mantle held out for a while, including one day into spring training, but eventually settled for their lower offer of $72,000 with an extra $2,000 bonus.
- Sandy Koufax and Don Drysdale, two top pitchers for the Los Angeles Dodgers, teamed up to jointly hold out for higher pay prior to the 1966 Major League Baseball season, and did not report to spring training. They were partly successful, securing salary raises but not the full amount they demanded. Both played in 1966. The incident was a significant development in the history of the then-nascent Major League Baseball Players Association and the election of Marvin Miller as its first executive director later in 1966.

=== National Basketball Association ===
- Following a loss in the 2021 NBA playoffs in Game 7 against the Atlanta Hawks, Ben Simmons demanded a trade and held out from participating in training camp and the regular season. The 76ers fined Simmons for conduct detrimental to the team, reportedly in excess of $19 million. After eight months, the 76ers traded Simmons along with players and picks to the Brooklyn Nets for James Harden and Paul Millsap.

=== National Football League ===
- With the first overall pick in the 1986 NFL draft, the Tampa Bay Buccaneers drafted Bo Jackson despite him telling the team he wanted to pursue a career as a baseball player. He never signed with the team.

=== National Hockey League ===
- Alexei Yashin sat out the 1999–2000 NHL season due to a contract dispute in the final year of his five year deal. He returned for the following season as a result of an arbitration case which determined that Yashin owed an additional year on his contract before he could become a free agent.

== See also ==
- Lockout (sports)
