= Jack Armstrong (serial) =

- Directed by: Wallace Fox
- Written by: Lewis Clay; Royal K. Cole; Arthur Hoerl; George H. Plympton; Leslie Swabacker
- Produced by: Sam Katzman; Melville De Lay (associate)
- Starring: John Hart; Rosemary LaPlanche; Claire James; Joe Brown, Jr. Pierre Watkin; Charles Middleton
- Narrated by: Knox Manning
- Cinematography: Ira H. Morgan
- Edited by: Earl Turner
- Music by: Lee Zahler
- Distributed by: Columbia Pictures
- Release date: February 6, 1947 (U.S.)
- Country: United States
- Language: English

Jack Armstrong (1947) is a Columbia film serial, based on the radio adventure series Jack Armstrong, the All-American Boy.

== Plot ==
Vic Hardy, a scientist working for Jim Fairfield's aviation company, is kidnapped by Jason Grood's gang after discovering radiation emitting from their secret island base. Grood (Charles Middleton) intends to conquer the world and forces Hardy to assist him.

Fairfield, along with his niece and nephew and, most importantly, the hero of the title, attempt to rescue Hardy and stop Grood's plans. They are assisted by the native tribe living on the island, led by Princess Alura.

== Cast ==
- John Hart as Jack Armstrong
- Rosemary LaPlanche as Betty Fairfield
- Claire James as Princess Alura [Chs. 3-6,9-11, 15]
- Charles Middleton as the villain Jason Grood (uncredited)
- Joe Brown, Jr. as Billy Fairfield (as Joe Brown)
- Pierre Watkin as Uncle Jim Fairfield
- Wheeler Oakman as Prof. Hobart Zorn
- Jack Ingram as Henchman Blair
- Eddie Parker as Henchman Slade
- Hugh Prosser as Vic Hardy

== Chapter titles ==
1. Mystery of the Cosmic Ray
2. The Far World
3. Island of Deception
4. Into the Chasm
5. The Space Ship
6. Tunnels of Treachery
7. Cavern of Chance
8. The Secret Room
9. Human Targets
10. Battle of the Warriors
11. Cosmic Annihilator
12. The Grotto of Greed
13. Wheels of Fate
14. Journey into Space
15. Retribution

_{Source:}

== See also ==
- List of film serials by year
- List of film serials by studio

Preceded by Son of the Guardsman (1946)	Columbia Serial; Jack Armstrong (1947)	Succeeded by The Vigilante (1947)
