= John Hart (actor) =

American actor

- John Hart in Hawkeye and the Last of the Mohicans 1957
- Born: John Lewis Hart; December 13, 1917; Los Angeles, California, U.S.
- Died: September 20, 2009 (aged 91); Playas de Rosarito, Baja California, Mexico
- Other name: John Hilton
- Occupation: Actor
- Years active: 1937–1982
- Spouse: Beryl Braithwaite (m. 1957–2009)
- Children: 1

John Lewis Hart (December 13, 1917 – September 20, 2009), also credited as John Hilton, was an American film and television actor. In his early career, Hart appeared mostly in westerns. Although Hart played mostly minor roles in some fairly well known films, he was probably best known for playing the character Hawkeye in the TV series Hawkeye and the Last of the Mohicans and replacing Clayton Moore in the television series The Lone Ranger for one season (1952–53), as well as playing Dr. Stein in the 1973 cult classic Blackenstein.

== Career ==
Hart began his screen career in 1937 with a bit part in Daughter of Shanghai. He continued in a variety of B pictures such as Prison Farm and King of Alcatraz before appearing in two of Cecil B. DeMille's films The Buccaneer (1938) and North West Mounted Police (1940). In 1941, Hart's acting career was interrupted when he was drafted into the United States Army. He rose to the rank of first sergeant in the Coast Artillery and eventually served in the Philippines. Following his military service, Hart worked frequently for Sam Katzman; he was given the lead role in the Jack Armstrong (1947) film serial. Hart did stunt work and acted in numerous westerns.

Hart was eventually offered the opportunity to replace Clayton Moore on The Lone Ranger television series. Based on the assumption that the masked character, rather than the actor, was the true star of The Lone Ranger, the program's producers fired Moore (presumably over salary differences) and replaced him with Hart, who was of a similar build and had a comparable background in Westerns. However, the public never truly accepted Hart as the Lone Ranger (his speaking voice was significantly different from Moore's), and by 1954 the producers returned Moore to the role. According to Clayton Moore's autobiography I Was That Masked Man, Moore never knew why he was replaced by Hart, and also stated that he had not sought a pay increase. Hart acted in minor roles in two episodes of The Lone Ranger before being asked to replace Clayton Moore for the entire third season. The episodes were "Rifles and Renegades" (#34) and "Sheriff at Gunstock" (#46).

Hart continued to act in films for more than two decades, appearing in films of several genres, almost always in supporting roles. Hart appeared twice on the TV series I Love Lucy as Lucy's old boyfriend and again in the Hollywood episodes as a lifeguard at the hotel pool. In 1955, Hart starred in the serial The Adventures of Captain Africa, which was originally intended to be a new movie about famous comic book hero The Phantom. However, licensing issues forced Columbia Pictures to re-film the entire serial and re-christen the hero "Captain Africa." Hart also had numerous supporting roles in the Highway Patrol TV series. Interviewed by Tom Weaver in "Western Clippings" magazine (May–June 2000), Hart revealed that he met actress Beryl Braithwaite when she played a role in an episode of the series; they married just days later, with "Hawkeye" co-star Lon Chaney Jr., the best man at the wedding.

In 1965 Hart made two brief appearances on the TV series Perry Mason, including the role of title character and murder victim Jamison Selff in "The Case of the Wrathful Wraith." In the 1970 film The Phynx, Hart played the Lone Ranger alongside Jay Silverheels as Tonto, spoofing their characters. Hart's last theatrical film appearance was in 1981's The Legend of the Lone Ranger in which he appeared as a newspaper editor. He appeared in the television series Happy Days as the Lone Ranger in the episode "Hi Yo, Fonzie Away" (February 9, 1982). In this episode Fonzie, played by Henry Winkler, meets his childhood hero, the Lone Ranger, for his birthday. Hart's other major late appearance was in an episode of The Greatest American Hero, "My Heroes Have Always Been Cowboys", in which Hart gives the title character an inspiring speech about heroism.

== Personal life and death ==
Hart was born in Los Angeles. His mother was named Enid, and he had a sister, Shari. Hart attended South Pasadena High School and later studied acting at the Pasadena Playhouse. He and his wife Beryl had a daughter, Robyn.

On September 20, 2009, Hart died from complications of dementia at his home in Playas de Rosarito, Baja California, Mexico at the age of 91. His ashes were scattered into the Pacific Ocean.

== Selected filmography ==
- 1937: Daughter of Shanghai - Sailor (uncredited)
- 1938: The Buccaneer - (uncredited)
- 1938: Dangerous to Know - Minor Role (uncredited)
- 1938: Tip-Off Girls - Truck Driver (uncredited)
- 1938: Hunted Men - Young Man at Party (uncredited)
- 1938: Prison Farm - 'Texas' Jack
- 1938: King of Alcatraz - 1st Radio Operator
- 1938: Touchdown, Army - Cadet Battle (uncredited)
- 1938: Illegal Traffic - Davis
- 1939: Disbarred - First Reporter
- 1939: Persons in Hiding - Male Stenographer
- 1939: Million Dollar Legs - Haldeman (uncredited)
- 1939: $1,000 a Touchdown - Buck (uncredited)
- 1940: North West Mounted Police - Constable Norman (uncredited)
- 1946: Son of the Guardsman (Serial) - Martin, Bullard soldier (uncredited)
- 1947: Vacation Days - Big Jim
- 1947: Jack Armstrong (Serial) - Jack Armstrong
- 1947: The Vigilantes Return - Henchman (uncredited)
- 1947: Last of the Redskins - British Sergeant (uncredited)
- 1947: Brick Bradford (Serial) - Dent
- 1948: I Love Trouble - Police Detective (uncredited)
- 1948: Tex Granger: Midnight Rider of the Plains - Crane (uncredited)
- 1948: Waterfront at Midnight - Woody
- 1948: The Velvet Touch - Partygoer's Escort (uncredited)
- 1948: A Southern Yankee - Orderly (uncredited)
- 1948: Joe Palooka in Winner Take All - Army Sergeant George Malone (uncredited)
- 1948: The Plunderers - Tom Powers (uncredited)
- 1949: El Paso - Mr. Ritter (uncredited)
- 1949: Batman and Robin (Serial) - John Hench / Mechanic [Ch. 2] (uncredited)
- 1949: Special Agent - Ranch Foreman Frank Kent
- 1949: Joe Palooka in the Counterpunch - Pedro
- 1949: The Fighting Redhead - Faro Savage
- 1949: Cowboy and the Prizefighter - Mark Palmer
- 1950: Champagne for Caesar - Executive No. 4
- 1950: State Penitentiary - Sandy' OHara - Convict (uncredited)
- 1950: Atom Man vs. Superman (Serial) - Henchman in Car [Ch. 3] (uncredited)
- 1950: Chain Gang - Chain Gang Member (uncredited)
- 1950: Hit Parade of 1951 - Bandit (uncredited)
- 1950: Hot Rod - Policeman (uncredited)
- 1950: Pirates of the High Seas (Serial) - Jenkins - aka Earl Turner [Ch.1] (uncredited)
- 1950: Revenue Agent - U.S. Border Patroman (uncredited)
- 1950-1953: The Lone Ranger (TV Series) - The Lone Ranger / Duke / Guard
- 1951: Colorado Ambush - The Fair-Minded Gambler (uncredited)
- 1951: Belle Le Grand - Man (uncredited)
- 1951: Fury of the Congo - Guard (uncredited)
- 1951: Stagecoach Driver - Slim Cole
- 1951: Warpath - Sgt. Plennert
- 1951: The Longhorn - Moresby
- 1951: The Wild Blue Yonder - General (uncredited)
- 1951: Texas Lawmen - Marshal Dave (uncredited)
- 1951: Stage to Blue River - Frederick Kingsley
- 1952: Texas City - 1st Sergeant (uncredited)
- 1952: Waco - Texas Ranger Carmody (uncredited)
- 1952: Aladdin and His Lamp - Gate Guard (uncredited)
- 1952: Jungle Jim in the Forbidden Land - Commissioner's Secretary (uncredited)
- 1952: Wild Stallion - Cavalry Corporal (uncredited)
- 1952: Thief of Damascus - Soldier / Messenger (uncredited)
- 1952: Kansas Territory - U.S. Marshal Matt Furness
- 1952: Dead Man's Trail - Ranger Captain (uncredited)
- 1952: Caribbean - Stuart
- 1952: The Golden Hawk - Pirate Helmsman (uncredited)
- 1952: The Pathfinder - British Sergeant
- 1953: The Lone Ranger (TV Series Season 3) - The Lone Ranger
- 1953: Prince of Pirates - Captain of the Guards (uncredited)
- 1953: The Great Adventures of Captain Kidd (Serial) - Jenkins [Chs.4-6, 8-10]
- 1953-1955: I Love Lucy (TV Series) - Jim Stevens / Lifeguard / Tom Henderson
- 1954: Gunfighters of the Northwest (Serial) - Sgt. Dan Wells (uncredited)
- 1955: Dial Red O - Uniformed Deputy (uncredited)
- 1955: The Adventures of Captain Africa (Serial) - Captain Africa
- 1956: The Crooked Web - Charlie Holt (uncredited)
- 1956: Perils of the Wilderness - Henchman (uncredited)
- 1956: The Ten Commandments - Cretan Ambassador (uncredited)
- 1957: Hawkeye and the Last of the Mohicans (TV Series~39 episodes~lead character) - Nat 'Hawkeye' Cutler
- 1958: Wolf Dog - Andy Bates (uncredited)
- 1958-1962: Leave It to Beaver (TV Series) - Forest Ranger / Construction Worker / Troop #21 Scoutmaster Norton
- 1959: Diary of a High School Bride - Policeman #1
- 1959: Inside the Mafia - State Trooper (uncredited)
- 1959: Vice Raid - Final Thug at Malone's Office (uncredited)
- 1959: Rawhide – Slim in S2:E6, "Incident of the 13th Man"
- 1960: Rawhide – Posseman in S2:E19, "Incident of the Sharpshooter"
- 1960: Rawhide – Murdoch in S2:E22, "Incident of the Champagne Bottles"
- 1960: Rawhide – Nate Johnson in S3:E2, "Incident of the Challenge"
- 1960: Noose for a Gunman - Dave Barker - Avery Gunman (uncredited)
- 1960: Bat Masterson - Jacobs (outlaw)
- 1960: The Subterraneans - Cop (uncredited)
- 1960: Bells Are Ringing - Party Guest (uncredited)
- 1961: Go Naked in the World - Club Doorman (uncredited)
- 1961: Pete and Gladys (CBS, TV Series) - Mervin
- 1961: Rawhide – Sheriff in S3:E11, "Incident of the Broken Word"
- 1961: Rawhide – Prussel in S3:E17, "Incident of the New Start"
- 1961: Rawhide – Rep One in S4:E2, "The Sendoff"
- 1961: Rawhide – Sheriff in S4:E5, "The Lost Tribe"
- 1961: Rawhide – Spence in S4:E11, "The Gentlemen's Gentleman"
- 1961: Atlantis, the Lost Continent - Nobleman (uncredited)
- 1961: Ada - Politician at Rally (uncredited)
- 1961-1962: Rawhide – Narbo in S4:7 Episodes
- 1961: Leave It To Beaver (TV Series) - S5E36 “A Night In The Woods” - as The Forest Ranger
- 1962: The Horizontal Lieutenant - Lieutenant (uncredited)
- 1962: Billy Rose's Jumbo - Marshall (uncredited)
- 1962: Mister Magoo's Christmas Carol as Billings, Stage Manager, Milkman
- 1963: The Courtship of Eddie's Father - State Trooper (uncredited)
- 1963: It Happened at the World's Fair - (uncredited)
- 1963: The Man from the Diners' Club (1963) - Motorcycle Patrolman (uncredited)
- 1963: Captain Newman, M.D. (1963) - Officer (uncredited)
- 1963: Rawhide – Narbo in S5:E31, "Abilene"
- 1964: Viva Las Vegas - Casino Patron (uncredited)
- 1964: Marnie - Dr. Gilliat - Minister (uncredited)
- 1964: 36 Hours - Lt. Cmdr. Perkins (uncredited)
- 1965: Rawhide – Harley Lear in S7:E13, "The Meeting"
- 1965: Rawhide – Narbo in S7:E22, "Prairie Fire"
- 1965: The Sandpiper - Trooper (uncredited)
- 1965: Zebra in the Kitchen - Zookeeper (uncredited)
- 1965: The Cincinnati Kid - Poker Player (uncredited)
- 1965: Day of the Nightmare - Dr. Philip Crane
- 1966: Hold On! - Detective
- 1966: Django spara per primo - (English version)
- 1967: Riot on Sunset Strip - Pritchard
- 1967: The Fastest Guitar Alive - Mint Guard (uncredited)
- 1968: Where Were You When the Lights Went Out? - Policeman (uncredited)
- 1970: The Phynx - The Lone Ranger
- 1971: Simon, King of the Witches - Doctor (uncredited)
- 1971: Refinements in Love - Jonas Brown Mart (uncredited)
- 1972: Bonnie's Kids
- 1972: The Roommates - Sam - Sheriff
- 1973: Santee - Cobbles
- 1973: Blackenstein - Dr. Stein
- 1974: Welcome to Arrow Beach - Doctor
- 1974: The Centerfold Girls - Sheriff (segment "The First Story")
- 1975: Gemini Affair - Bob
- 1976: Blood Voyage - Jules
- 1977: John Hus Theologian
- 1978: Invisible Strangler - Harbormaster
- 1978: Cheerleaders Beach Party - Mr. Langley
- 1978: Chips (TV series~S2 ep13) - boat owner
- 1981: The Greatest American Hero (TV Series) - Himself
- 1981: The Legend of the Lone Ranger - Lucas Striker
- 1982: Happy Days (TV Series) - Lone Ranger (final appearance)

Acting roles
Preceded by Clayton Moore	The Lone Ranger actor 1952 – '53	Succeeded by Clayton Moore
Preceded by Michael Rye	The Lone Ranger actor 1981	Succeeded by Klinton Spilsbury
Preceded by Klinton Spilsbury	The Lone Ranger actor 1982	Succeeded by Chad Michael Murray
