= Steve Pendleton =

American actor (1908–1984)

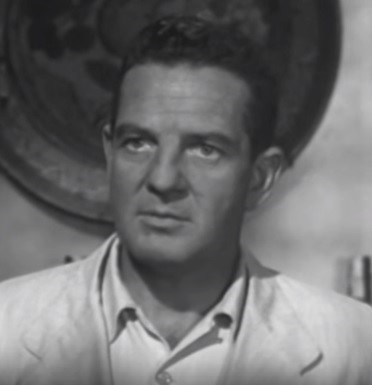
- Born: September 16, 1908; New York City, U.S.
- Died: October 3, 1984 (aged 76); Pasadena, California, U.S.
- Occupation: Actor
- Years active: 1923–1976

Steve Pendleton (September 16, 1908 – October 3, 1984) was an American film and television actor. He also went by Gaylord Pendleton as a Broadway performer. He was in more than 220 different films and television episodes. Pendleton appeared in films and on television alongside Roy Rogers, John Wayne, and Gene Autry.

== Biography ==
George Gaylord "Steve" Pendleton.

== Selected filmography ==
He appeared in more than 150 films between 1923 and 1960, including:

- Success (1923) as Joe
- Manslaughter (1930)
- Up the River (1930)
- Seas Beneath (1931)
- The Last Parade (1931)
- Unknown Valley (1933)
- Fighting to Live (1934)
- Love Past Thirty (1934)
- The Judgement Book (1935)
- Trails End (1935)
- The Informer (1935)
- The Duke of West Point (1938)
- Enemy Agent (1940)
- One Crowded Night (1940)
- Men of the Timberland (1941)
- Eyes of the Underworld (1942)
- Untamed Fury (1947)
- Roll, Thunder, Roll! (1949)
- Ride, Ryder, Ride! (1949)
- The Blazing Trail (1949)
- Rio Grande (1950)
- Gunfire (1950)
- When the Redskins Rode (1951)
- Jack Slade (1953)
- Killers from Space (1954)
- Official Detective series Episode: "The Jailhouse Gang" as Aldworth
- I Married a Woman (1958)
- Once Upon a Horse... (1958)
- Tora! Tora! Tora! (1970) - Destroyer Captain (uncredited)
