= Saddle Serenade =

1945 film

- Theatrical release poster
- Directed by: Oliver Drake
- Screenplay by: Frances Kavanaugh
- Produced by: Oliver Drake
- Starring: Jimmy Wakely; Lee "Lasses" White; John James; Nancy Brinckman; Jack Ingram; Claire James
- Cinematography: William A. Sickner
- Edited by: William Austin
- Music by: Frank Sanucci
- Production company: Monogram Pictures
- Distributed by: Monogram Pictures
- Release date: August 11, 1945
- Running time: 57 minutes
- Country: United States
- Language: English

Saddle Serenade is a 1945 American Western film directed by Oliver Drake and written by Frances Kavanaugh. The film stars Jimmy Wakely, Lee "Lasses" White, John James, Nancy Brinckman, Jack Ingram and Claire James. The film was released on August 11, 1945, by Monogram Pictures.

== Plot ==
A group of tourists heading for a stay at a dude ranch are ambushed by bandits that leads to the murder of a deputy marshal and an international jewel smuggling ring. Jimmy Wakely is there for the shootin', the singin' and the solvin' of the mystery.

== Cast ==
- Jimmy Wakely as Jimmy Wakely
- Lee "Lasses" White as Lasses
- John James as Dusty Smith
- Nancy Brinckman as Doris Rogers
- Jack Ingram as Roy Williams
- Claire James as Brenda Ames
- Pat Gleason as Vaughn
- Kay Deslys as Fanny Vandercoop
- Roy Butler as Sheriff Hawkins
- Foy Willing as Guitar Player

== Songs ==
- Cool Water

Written by Bob Nolan

- Stay Away From My Door

Written by Jimmy Wakely and Oliver Drake

- Saddle Serenade

Written by Jimmy Wakely

All performed by Jimmy Wakely and the Riders of the Purple Sage

- I've Got Nuggets In My Pocket

Performed by Jimmy Wakely and Lee 'Lasses' White

- Saddle Pals

Written and sung by Jimmy Wakely

- Chiquita

Written by Sam H. Stept

- I'll Be A Cowboy 'Till I Die

Written by Foy Willing
