= Quentin Sondergaard =

American film and television actor (1925–1984)

- Publicity Photo of Quentin Sondergaard
- Born: Quentin Charles Sondergaard; January 11, 1925; Seattle, Washington, U.S.
- Died: February 15, 1984 (aged 59); Riverside County, California, U.S.
- Occupations: Film and television actor
- Years active: 1951–1982

Quentin Charles Sondergaard (January 11, 1925 – February 15, 1984) was an American film and television actor. He was best known for playing Deputy Sheriff Quint in the first and third season of the American western television series Tombstone Territory.

== Life and career ==
Sondergaard was born in Seattle, Washington. He began his screen career in 1951, appearing in the film Badman's Gold, playing Rambo. In 1957, he appeared in the television programs Have Gun – Will Travel, Highway Patrol, Men of Annapolis and Death Valley Days.

Later in his career, Sondergaard guest-starred in television programs including Gunsmoke, Zane Grey Theatre, Wagon Train, Trackdown, The Life and Legend of Wyatt Earp, Bat Masterson, The Wild Wild West and Bonanza. From 1958 to 1960, he played Deputy Sheriff Quint in the first and third season of the ABC western television series Tombstone Territory. He also appeared in films, such as, The Miracle, This Property Is Condemned, Five Guns to Tombstone and Gunfight in Abilene.

Sondergaard retired from acting in 1982, last appearing in the film The Ghost Dance, where he played the campus guard.

== Death ==
Sondergaard died on February 15, 1984 in Riverside County, California, at the age of 59.

== Filmography ==
=== Film ===
Year	Title	Role	Notes
1951	Badman's Gold	Rambo	
1959	The Miracle	Guarda	Uncredited
1960	Five Guns to Tombstone	Hank	
1966	This Property Is Condemned	Hank	
1967	Gunfight in Abilene	Cattleman	Uncredited
1982	The Ghost Dance	Campus Guard	

=== Television ===
Year	Title	Role	Notes
1957	Highway Patrol	First Pusher	Episode: "Narcotics"
1957, 1960	Have Gun – Will Travel	Billy Wheeler / Townsman	2 episodes
1957–1965	Death Valley Days	Various roles	4 episodes
1958	Trackdown	Townsman	Episode: "Chinese Cowboy"
1958	Buckskin	Ferd	Episode: "Miss Pringle"
1958	Men of Annapolis	O'Grady	2 episodes
1958–1959	The Californians	Various roles	4 episodes
1958–1960	Tombstone Territory	Deputy Quint	24 episodes
1958–1961	Bat Masterson	Various roles	5 episodes
1959	U.S. Marshal	Pete Magna	Episode: "Gold Is Where You Find It"
1959	Black Saddle	Chuck	Episode: "Client: Travers"
1959	Dick Powell's Zane Grey Theatre	Cpl. Johnson / Barney Hollis	2 episodes
1959	Rescue 8	Gate Guard	Episode: "Tower of Hate"
1959	Tales of Wells Fargo	Henchman Sam	Episode: "The Little Man"
1959	Dragnet	Dennis Carls	Episode: "The Big Counterfeit"
1959	The Deputy	Tomick	Episode: "Badge for a Day"
1959	The Life and Legend of Wyatt Earp	Shotgun Rider / Road Agent	2 episodes
1959	Shotgun Slade	Joe Cassidy	Episode: "Too Smart to Love"
1959, 1960	Wagon Train	Trooper / Josh Charvanaugh	2 episodes
1960	Overland Trail	Jack Rance	Episode: "West of Boston"
1961	Klondike	Guard	Episode: "The Golden Burro"
1961	Gunslinger	Messenger	Episode: "The Diehards"
1961–1962	Gunsmoke	Hank / Friend / Cowboy	3 episodes
1962	Rawhide	Morse	Episode: "Gold Fever"
1963	The Untouchables	Lennie	Episode: "An Eye for an Eye"
1963	Arrest and Trial	Policeman	Episode: "The Quality of Justice"
1963	Kraft Suspense Theatre	Barman	Episode: "The Name of the Game"
1965	My Three Sons	Policeman	2 episodes
1965–1969	Bonanza	Various roles	4 episodes
1966	A Man Called Shenandoah	Deputy	Episode: "A Long Way Home"
1966–1968	The Wild Wild West	Driver/ Various roles	S3 E17/ 3 episodes
1966–1968	The Virginian	Driver/ Various roles	7 episodes
1967	Hondo	Stoner	Episode: "Hondo and the Hanging Town"
1967	Iron Horse	Guard / Sgt. Harris	2 episodes
1968	The Outcasts	Sergeant	Episode: "The Night Riders"
1968, 1970	Adam-12	Tom Oaks / Lt. Moore	2 episodes
1969	The Name of the Game	1st Worker	Episode: "Blind Man's Bluff"
