= Don Reynolds (actor) =

American actor and animal trainer (1937–2019)

- Born: Don Kay Reynolds; May 29, 1937; Odell, Texas, United States
- Died: January 9, 2019 (aged 81); Fort Worth, Texas, United States
- Occupations: Film actor, animal trainer
- Years active: 1944–2003
- Spouse: Cynthia Kieschnick (1960 - ?)

Don Reynolds (May 29, 1937 – January 9, 2019) was an American child actor and later an animal trainer.

Born on May 29, 1937, in Odell, Texas, he began his film career with a small part in The Yellow Rose of Texas in 1944. He is most known for playing a Native American boy, "Little Beaver", in four pictures between 1948 and 1951. He was often billed as Little Brown Jug. After appearing in an episode of The Adventures of Kit Carson in 1951, he ended his professional acting career.

In later life, Reynolds trained animals in movies such as The Lord of the Rings: The Fellowship of the Ring and Santa Claus: The Movie. His father, Fess, and half-brother Sled Reynolds were camel trainers on the made-for-television movie The Three Kings (1987). He starred as Doc Brown in the western TV web series Sundown.

In 1960, Reynolds married Cynthia Kieschnick.

In 2015, Reynolds was inducted into the Texas Rodeo Cowboy Hall of Fame.

== Filmography ==
Year	Title	Role	Notes
1944	The Yellow Rose of Texas	Pinto	Uncredited
1946	Song of Arizona	Brown Jug	Uncredited
1946	Romance of the Wset	Little Brown Jug	
1947	The Last Round-Up	Indian boy	Uncredited
1948	Whirlwind Raiders	Tommy Ross	
1949	Ride, Ryder, Ride!	Little Beaver	
1949	The Red Pony	Little Brown Jug	
1949	Roll, Thunder, Roll!	Little Beaver	
1949	The Fighting Redhead	Little Beaver	
1949	Cowboy and the Prizefighter	Little Beaver	
1950	Beyond the Purple Hills	Chip Beaumont	
1950	Streets of Ghost Town	Tommy Donner	
1951	The Painted Hills	Red Wing	
1951	Snake River Desperadoes	Little Hawk	
