= Cheerleaders Beach Party =

- film poster (1978)
- Directed by: Alex E. Goitein
- Written by: Chuck Vincent
- Produced by: Alex E. Goitein
- Starring: Elizabeth Loredan; Jamie Jenson; Lynn Hastings; Gloria Upson
- Cinematography: Werner Hlinka
- Edited by: Enzo Bartoccioli
- Production company: Cannon Productions, Inc.
- Distributed by: Cannon Film Distributors
- Release date: September 1978
- Running time: 85 min.
- Country: United States

Cheerleaders Beach Party is a 1978 comedy film by producer/director Alex E. Goitein and writer Chuck Vincent.

It stars Elizabeth Loredan, Jamie Jenson, Lynn Hastings, and Gloria Upson as college cheerleaders out to save their team, the Rambling U. Rams.

It was released on DVD by Telavista in 2007.

== Cast ==
- Elizabeth Loredan as Monica
- Jamie Jenson as Toni
- Lynn Hastings as Sissy
- Gloria Upson as Sheryl
- Rick Gitlin as Mitch Stevens
- Max Goff as Stanley Kraus

Rambling players and staff

- Mark Sarro as Bill Ubell
- John Williams as Lee Williams
- Michael Jefferson as Jim Norris
- Ray Sherry as Coach Hensen

State cheerleaders and staff

- Shoshanna Asher as Honey
- Cheri Southie as Ginger
- Malvina Golden as Sugar
- John Hart as Mr. Langley
- Robert E. Miller as Coach Wilson
- W.P. Dremak as Dean Higgins
- Joan Sumner as Mrs. Higgins

== Plot ==
Rambling U. cheerleaders (Monica, Toni, Sissy, and Sheryl) work together to keep State U. from stealing Rambling’s star football players.

State’s Mr. Langley — on behalf of Coach Wilson — takes the players on a trip to Bell Harbor, to convince them that State has much more to offer. (better scholarships, facilities, contacts, and a more prestigious degree)

Rambling’s Coach Hensen does not see anything he can do to stop it, given Rambling’s limited resources, so the four girls take it on themselves to do whatever is required to convince the players to stay at Rambling. 1970s-era sex-comedy high jinks ensue as the girls compete with stuck-up State cheerleaders to get their players back.

The Rambling U. cheerleaders succeed by infiltrating parties and meetings with sex, disguises and drugs. They also recruit State's star players, Mitch Stevens and Stanley Kraus, to boot.
