= Colorado Serenade =

1946 film directed by Robert Emmett Tansey

- Theatrical release poster
- Directed by: Robert Emmett Tansey
- Screenplay by: Frances Kavanaugh
- Produced by: Robert Emmett Tansey
- Starring: Eddie Dean; Roscoe Ates; David Sharpe; Mary Kenyon; Forrest Taylor; Dennis Moore; Abigail Adams
- Cinematography: Robert Shackelford
- Edited by: Hugh Winn
- Production company: Producers Releasing Corporation
- Distributed by: Producers Releasing Corporation
- Release date: June 30, 1946
- Running time: 68 minutes
- Country: United States
- Language: English

Colorado Serenade (also known as Gentlemen with Guns) is a 1946 American Western film directed by Robert Emmett Tansey and written by Frances Kavanaugh. The film stars Eddie Dean, Roscoe Ates, David Sharpe, Mary Kenyon, Forrest Taylor, Dennis Moore and Abigail Adams. The film was released on June 30, 1946, by Producers Releasing Corporation.

== Cast ==
- Eddie Dean as Eddie Dean
- Roscoe Ates as Soapy
- David Sharpe as Nevada
- Mary Kenyon as Sherry Lynn
- Forrest Taylor as Judge Roy Hilton
- Dennis Moore as Duke Dillon
- Abigail Adams as Lola
- Warner Richmond as Dad Dillon
- Lee Bennett as Parson Trimble
- Robert McKenzie as Col. Blake
- Bob Duncan as Ringo
