= Below the Border =

1942 film

- Theatrical release poster
- Directed by: Howard Bretherton
- Screenplay by: Adele Buffington
- Produced by: Scott R. Dunlap
- Starring: Buck Jones; Tim McCoy; Raymond Hatton
- Cinematography: Harry Neumann
- Edited by: Carl Pierson
- Music by: Edward J. Kay
- Production company: Monogram Pictures
- Distributed by: Monogram Pictures
- Release date: January 30, 1942
- Running time: 57 minutes
- Country: United States
- Language: English

Below the Border is a 1942 American Western film directed by Howard Bretherton and written by Adele Buffington. This is the fourth film in Monogram Pictures' Rough Riders series, and stars Buck Jones as Marshal Buck Roberts, Tim McCoy as Marshal Tim McCall and Raymond Hatton as Marshal Sandy Hopkins, with Linda Brent, Dennis Moore and Charles King. The film was released on September 26, 1941

== Plot ==
When villains plan to steal the Garcia jewels, the Rough Riders stop the thieves with Buck impersonating an outlaw, Tim a cattle buyer and Sandy as the janitor of the town's saloon.

== Cast ==
- Buck Jones as Marshal Buck Roberts aka Bob 'Bodie' Bronson
- Tim McCoy as Marshal Tim McCall
- Raymond Hatton as Sandy Hopkins
- Linda Brent as Rosita Garcia
- Dennis Moore as Joe Collins
- Charles King as Steve Slade
- Eva Puig as Aunt Maria
- Roy Barcroft as Ed Scully
- Kermit Maynard as Jeff
- Bud Osborne as Hal

== Production ==
Though set in Mexico, in order not to offend the United States' Good Neighbor policy, the Production Code Administration ordered changes to the script to not depict any Mexican outlaws or offensively characterise any Mexican nationals.
