= Linda Brent (actress) =

American actress (1919–1994)

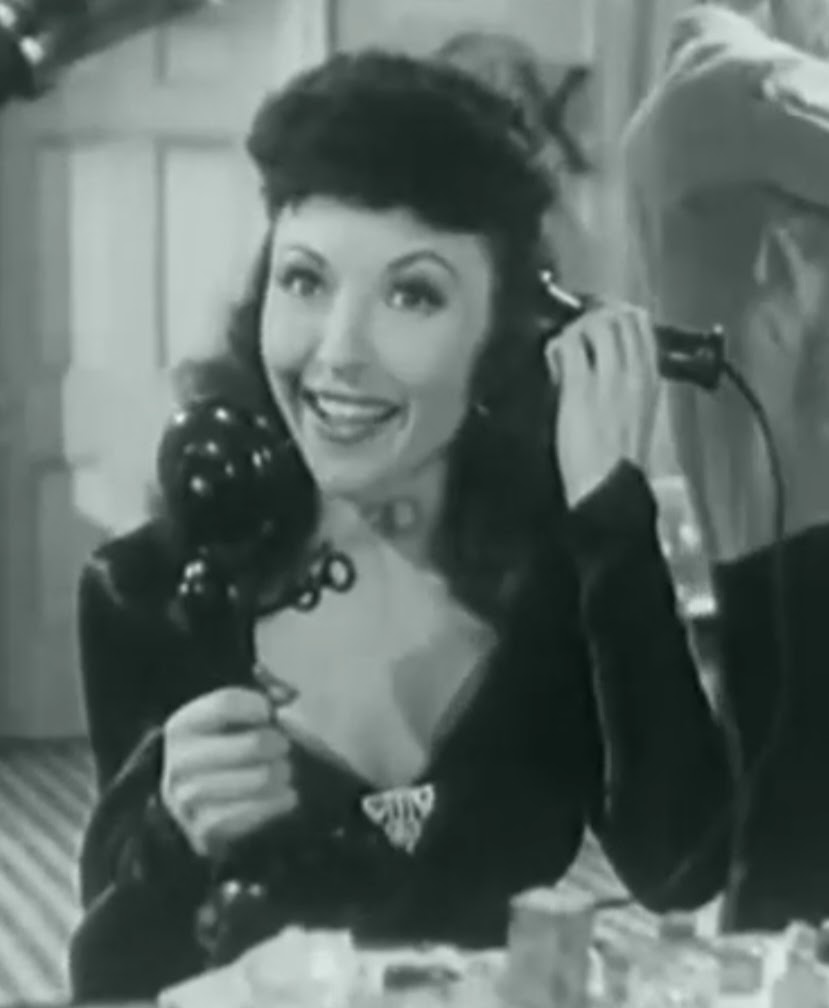
- Brent in The Affairs of Jimmy Valentine (1942)
- Born: Linda Laura Brent; August 14, 1919; Shanghai, China
- Died: May 7, 1994 (aged 74); Los Angeles, California, U.S.
- Other name: the "prettiest white girl in Shanghai"
- Occupation: Actress
- Years active: 1939–1964

Linda Laura Brent (August 14, 1919 – May 7, 1994) was an American actress. She is best known for appearing in westerns such as Below the Border (1942), Death Valley Rangers (1943) and The Laramie Trail (1944). Born in Shanghai, China to an Irish father and a Russian mother (née Vassilieva), Brent was voted as the "prettiest white girl in Shanghai" and later became an American citizen in 1942.

== Filmography ==
=== Film ===
Year	Title	Role	Notes
1939	Coast Guard	Minor Role	(uncredited)
1939	$1,000 a Touchdown	Bertie	(uncredited)
1942	Today I Hang		(uncredited)
1942	Below the Border	Rosita Garcia	
1942	Ride 'Em Cowboy	Sunbeam	(uncredited)
1942	Broadway	Hat Check Girl	(uncredited)
1942	The Affairs of Jimmy Valentine	Letitia Hinkle	
1942	You're Telling Me	Leili	
1942	The Old Homestead	Bunny	
1942	Moonlight in Havana	Operator	(uncredited)
1942	Arabian Nights	Harem Girl	(uncredited)
1943	Salute for Three	Canteen Worker	(uncredited)
1943	Fired Wife	Divorcee	(uncredited)
1943	So Proudly We Hail!	Filipino Nurse	(uncredited)
1943	A Scream in the Dark	Stella	
1943	Death Valley Rangers	Lorna Ainsley	
1943	In Old Oklahoma	Dance-Hall Girl	(uncredited)
1944	Career Girl	Thelma Mason	
1944	Cover Girl	Chorus Girl	(uncredited)
1944	The Laramie Trail	Vega Alarcon	
1944	Follow the Boys	Magic Maid	(uncredited)
1944	The Story of Dr. Wassell	Fashta	(uncredited)
1944	Belle of the Yukon	Yukon Belle	(uncredited)
1945	George White's Scandals	Showgirl	(uncredited)
1946	Cinderella Jones	Junior Leaguer	(uncredited)
1946	Till the Clouds Roll By	Showgirl	(uncredited)
1957	Chicago Confidential	'B' Girl	(uncredited)
1964	Robin and the 7 Hoods	Derelict	(uncredited)

=== Television ===
Year	Title	Role	Notes
1956	Death Valley Days	Lupin	1 episode
1956	Sergeant Preston of the Yukon	Rita Mendoza	1 episode
1956	I Led 3 Lives	Shari Bruner	1 episode
