= Chip Hayes =

American soap opera writer, producer and director

Chip Hayes (born December 15, 1956) is an American soap opera writer, producer, and director.

== Personal life ==
He is married to actress Deborah Adair, with whom he has two adopted children.

He is the son of actress Nancy Gates and entertainment lawyer J. William Hayes.

== Positions held ==
All My Children (hired by Megan McTavish and later rehired by Ginger Smith)

- Head writer: Fall 2013 (with Lisa Connor as co-head writer)
- Script writer (March 25, 2008 - February 12, 2010; December 29, 2010 - September 23, 2011; April 29, 2013 – present)
- Associate head writer (January 7, 2004 - January 14, 2008; February 17, 2010 - January 5, 2011)

General Hospital (hired by Anne Howard Bailey)

- Breakdown Writer: 1985 - 1990

Melrose Place (hired by Darren Star)

- Producer: 1992–1998
- Director: 1992–1998
- Script writer: 1994–1998

The Young and the Restless (hired by William J. Bell)

- Breakdown writer: 1983 - 1985

== Awards and nominations ==
Nominated for a Daytime Emmy Award in 2004 and 2012.
