= The Enchanted Valley =

1948 film directed by Robert Emmett Tansey

- Directed by: Robert Emmett Tansey
- Screenplay by: Frances Kavanaugh
- Produced by: Jack Schwarz
- Starring: Alan Curtis; Anne Gwynne; Charley Grapewin; Donn Gift; Joseph Crehan; Joe Devlin; Lash LaRue
- Cinematography: Ernest Miller
- Edited by: George McGuire
- Music by: Lucien Cailliet
- Production company: Jack Schwarz Productions
- Distributed by: Eagle-Lion Films
- Release date: March 24, 1948
- Running time: 77 minutes
- Country: United States
- Language: English

The Enchanted Valley is a 1948 American Cinecolor drama film directed by Robert Emmett Tansey and written by Frances Kavanaugh. The film stars Alan Curtis, Anne Gwynne, Charley Grapewin, Donn Gift, Joseph Crehan, Lash LaRue, and Joe Devlin. The film was released on March 24, 1948, by Eagle-Lion Films.

== Plot ==
The peaceful woodland home of a crippled boy and his grandfather is invaded by armed robbers. However, the natural setting and the boy's gentle personality have an unforeseen reforming effect on the criminals.

== Cast ==
- Alan Curtis as Johnny Nelson
- Anne Gwynne as Midge Gray
- Charley Grapewin as Grandpa
- Donn Gift as Timmy
- Joseph Crehan as Chief Scott
- Joe Devlin as Bugs Mason
- Lash LaRue as Pretty Boy
- John Bleifer as Menelli
- Gene Alsace as Constable
- Jerry Riggio as Gangster
- Jimmy the Crow as Jim the Crow
- Skipper the Dog as Skipper the Dog
- Tubby the Bear as Tubby the Bear
