= Forbidden Jungle =

1950 film

- Theatrical release poster
- Directed by: Robert Emmett Tansey
- Screenplay by: Frances Kavanaugh
- Produced by: Jack Schwarz
- Starring: Don C. Harvey; Forrest Taylor; Alyce Louis; Robert Cabal
- Cinematography: Clark Ramsey
- Edited by: Reg Browne
- Music by: Darrell Calker
- Production company: Jack Schwarz Productions
- Distributed by: Eagle-Lion Films
- Release date: March 2, 1950
- Running time: 66 minutes
- Country: United States
- Language: English

Forbidden Jungle is a 1950 American adventure film directed by Robert Emmett Tansey and written by Frances Kavanaugh. The film stars Don C. Harvey, Forrest Taylor, Alyce Louis and Robert Cabal. It was released on March 2, 1950 by Eagle-Lion Films.

== Plot ==
An American big-game hunter is asked to search for a boy who is rumored to be missing deep in the jungle.

== Cast ==
- Don C. Harvey as Tom Burton
- Forrest Taylor as Trader Kirk
- Alyce Louis as Nita
- Robert Cabal as Tawa
- Tamba as Tamba
