= Should a Girl Marry? (1939 film) =

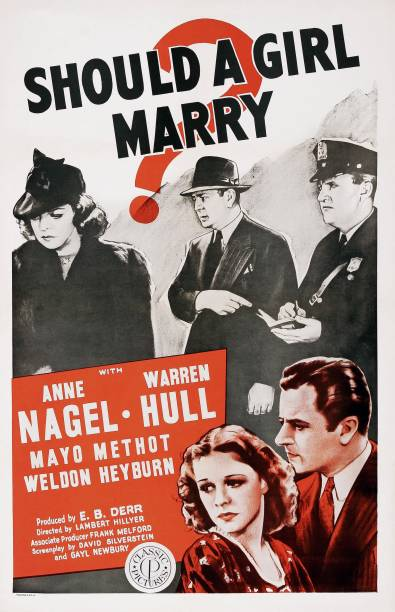
- Theatrical release poster
- Directed by: Lambert Hillyer
- Screenplay by: David Silverstein; Gaye Newberry
- Produced by: E.B. Derr
- Starring: Anne Nagel; Warren Hull; Mayo Methot; Weldon Heyburn; Aileen Pringle; Lester Matthews
- Cinematography: Paul Ivano
- Edited by: Russell F. Schoengarth
- Production company: Crescent Pictures Corporation
- Distributed by: Monogram Pictures
- Release date: June 8, 1939
- Running time: 61 minutes
- Country: United States
- Language: English

The full film

Should a Girl Marry? is a 1939 American crime film directed by Lambert Hillyer and written by David Silverstein and Gaye Newberry. The film stars Anne Nagel, Warren Hull, Mayo Methot, Weldon Heyburn, Aileen Pringle and Lester Matthews. The film was released on June 8, 1939, by Monogram Pictures.

== Cast ==
- Anne Nagel as Margaret
- Warren Hull as Dr. Robert Benson
- Mayo Methot as Betty Gilbert
- Weldon Heyburn as Harry Gilbert
- Aileen Pringle as Mrs. White
- Lester Matthews as Dr. White
- Helen Brown as Mary Winters
- Sarah Padden as Mrs. Wilson
- Gordon Hart as Mr. Wilson
- Edmund Elton as Dr. Turner
- Robert Elliott as Warden
- Claire Rochelle as Hysterical Patient
- Arthur Loft as Dr. Garfield
- Harry Hayden as Dr. Willard
- Bess Flowers as Nurse
