= Ride, Ryder, Ride! =

1949 film by Lewis D. Collins

- Lobby card
- Directed by: Lewis D. Collins
- Written by: Fred Harman; Paul Franklin
- Produced by: Jerry Thomas; Jack Schwarz
- Starring: Jim Bannon; Don Reynolds; Emmett Lynn
- Cinematography: Gilbert Warrenton
- Edited by: Joseph Gluck
- Music by: Darrell Calker
- Production company: Equity Pictures
- Distributed by: Eagle-Lion Films
- Release date: February 2, 1949
- Running time: 59 minutes
- Country: United States
- Language: English

Ride, Ryder, Ride! is a 1949 American Cinecolor Western film directed by Lewis D. Collins and starring Jim Bannon, Don Reynolds and Emmett Lynn. It is based on the Red Ryder series by Fred Harman, one of four films made by Eagle-Lion Films featuring the character.

== Cast ==
- Jim Bannon as Red Ryder
- Don Reynolds as Little Beaver
- Emmett Lynn as Buckskin Blodgett
- Marin Sais as The Duchess, Red's Aunt
- Edwin Max as Frenchy Beaumont
- Peggy Stewart as Libby Brooks
- Steve Pendleton as Gerry Brooks
- Jean Budinger as Marge
- Jack O'Shea as henchman Blackjack
- Fred Coby as Henry W. Iverson
- William Fawcett as judge Prescott
- Steve Clark as Tom - printer
- Billy Hammond as henchman Pinto
