= The Fighting Redhead =

1949 film by Lewis D. Collins

- Original film poster
- Directed by: Lewis D. Collins
- Screenplay by: Paul Franklin; Jerry Thomas
- Based on: Fred Harman (based on the comic strips by)
- Produced by: Jerry Thomas
- Starring: Jim Bannon
- Cinematography: Gilbert Warrenton
- Edited by: Joseph Gluck (as Joseph P. Gluck)
- Music by: Darrell Calker
- Color process: Cinecolor
- Production companies: Jack Schwarz Productions; Equity Films
- Distributed by: Eagle-Lion Films
- Release date: October 5, 1949
- Running time: 55 minutes
- Country: United States
- Language: English

The Fighting Redhead is a 1949 American Western film directed by Lewis D. Collins and starring Jim Bannon as Red Ryder in the final film of the series. The film was shot at the Iverson Movie Ranch. The film was written by Thomas Evans. It was released in streaming platforms years later in 2020.

== Plot ==
Red Ryder, Buckskin, the Duchess and Little Beaver go to the help of an old rancher who has been threatened by the gang of a crooked saloon keeper. They run into his revenge-seeking daughter who's quick on the draw.

== Cast ==
- Jim Bannon as Red Ryder
- Don Reynolds as Little Beaver (as Little Brown Jug)
- Emmett Lynn as Buckskin
- Marin Sais as Duchess
- Peggy Stewart as Sheila O'Connor
- John Hart as Faro Savage
- Lane Bradford as Henchman Windy
- Forrest Taylor as Dan O'Connor
- Lee Roberts as Henchman Goldie Grant
- Bob Duncan as Sheriff
- Sandy Sanders as Ranch Hand Joe
- Billy Hammond as Bill Evans
- Spooky Reynolds as Mary - Joe's Daughter (as 'Spooky' Reynolds)

== See also ==
- List of American films of 1949
