= Frances Kavanaugh =

American screenwriter (1915–2009)

- Born: February 5, 1915; Dallas, Texas, US
- Died: January 23, 2009 (aged 93); Encino, California, USA
- Occupation: Screenwriter
- Years active: 1941–1954

Frances Kavanaugh (February 5, 1915 – January 23, 2009) was an American screenwriter known for penning B-Westerns.

== Biography ==
=== Beginnings ===
Born in Dallas, Texas, to Clyde and Robbie Kavanaugh, Frances grew up in Houston around ranching, cowboys, and horseback riding. She graduated from San Jacinto High School and then studied accounting at the University of Texas before moving to Los Angeles with her parents in 1940. She was married and divorced some time before 1940.

=== Hollywood career ===
She began writing scenarios after attending a workshop held by director Max Reinhart, and her scripts soon caught the eye of director Robert Emmett Tansey. He gave her a job at his production company, and she eventually proved her talent for screenwriting. Due to her prolific output of Western scripts in the 1940s, Kavanaugh was dubbed "the Cowgirl of the Typewriter." In fact, she penned more than 30 scripts over the course of the decade, including Song of Old Wyoming and Cattle Queen.

=== Personal life ===
She married fellow screenwriter Robert Hecker in 1951, after the pair met at a writing course at Hollywood High's night school, and the pair wrote several TV scripts together before Kavanaugh retired to raise her children. Once her children were grown, Kavanaugh attended Cal State Northridge and earned degrees in psychology and art; she'd later work as an art therapist for children. She died in 2009 after a lengthy battle with lymphoma.

== Selected filmography ==
- Cattle Queen (1951)
- The Fighting Stallion (1950)
- Forbidden Jungle (1950)
- The Enchanted Valley (1948)
- Wild West (1946)
- Stars Over Texas (1946)
- Driftin' River (1946)
- Tumbleweed Trail (1946)
- Colorado Serenade (1946)
- The Caravan Trail (1946)
- Romance of the West (1946)
- God's Country (1946)
- Song of Old Wyoming (1945)
- Saddle Serenade (1945)
- Wildfire: The Story of a Horse (1945)
- Springtime in Texas (1945)
- Sonora Stagecoach (1944)
- Outlaw Trail (1944)
- Arizona Whirlwind (1944)
- Westward Bound (1944)
- Blazing Guns (1943)
- The Law Rides Again (1943)
- Trail Riders (1942)
- Where Trail Ends (1942)
- Arizona Roundup (1942)
- Western Mail (1942)
- Lone Star Law Men (1941)
- Riding the Sunset Trail (1941)
- Dynamite Canyon (1941)
