= John Wilder (producer) =

American television producer (born 1936)

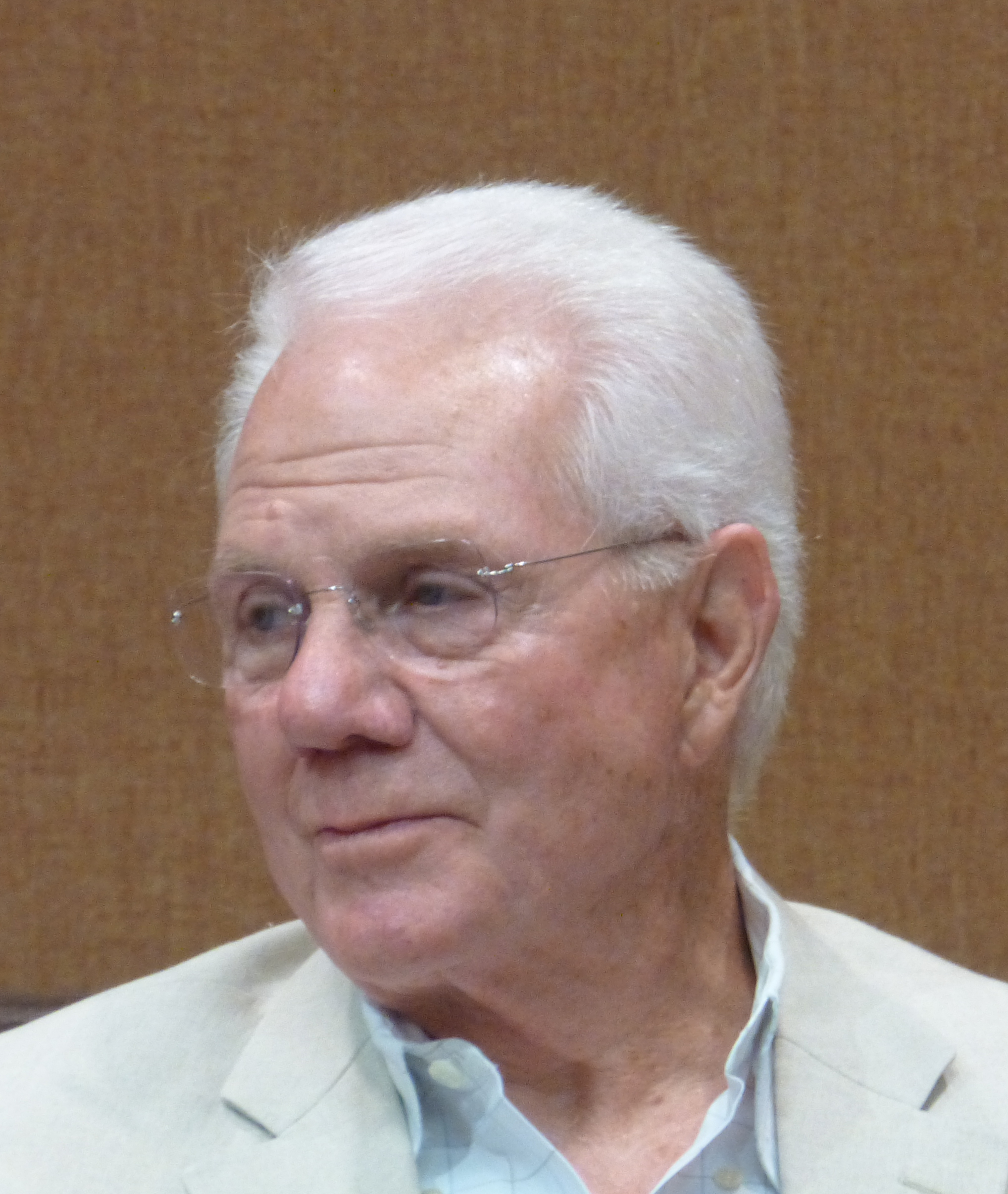
- Wilder in 2013
- Born: John Keith McGovern; May 28, 1936 (age 89); Tacoma, Washington, U.S.
- Other names: Johnny McGovern
- Occupations: Actor, writer, director, producer
- Years active: 1943–present
- Spouse: Carolyn Cunningham (divorced)
- Children: 3

John Wilder (born John Keith McGovern; May 28, 1936) is an American television producer, writer, and former actor. He received two Primetime Emmy Award nominations for Outstanding Drama Series for his work on The Streets of San Francisco, and created the series The Yellow Rose and Spenser: For Hire. He was also the producer of the miniseries Centennial.

As an actor, he appeared in films including Tumbleweed Trail (1946), When I Grow Up (1951), Singin' in the Rain (1952), The Pride of St. Louis (1952), Peter Pan (1953), Hold Back the Night (1956), and Five Guns to Tombstone (1960).

== Life and career ==
Wilder was born in Tacoma, Washington, on May 28, 1936. He began performing as a tap dancer by the time he was four years old. His family moved to Los Angeles in 1943, and, under his birth name, Johnny McGovern, he began a career as a child actor. For four years, he starred on the Red Ryder radio series as Little Beaver, and performed over 2500 broadcasts during the 1940s and early 1950s.

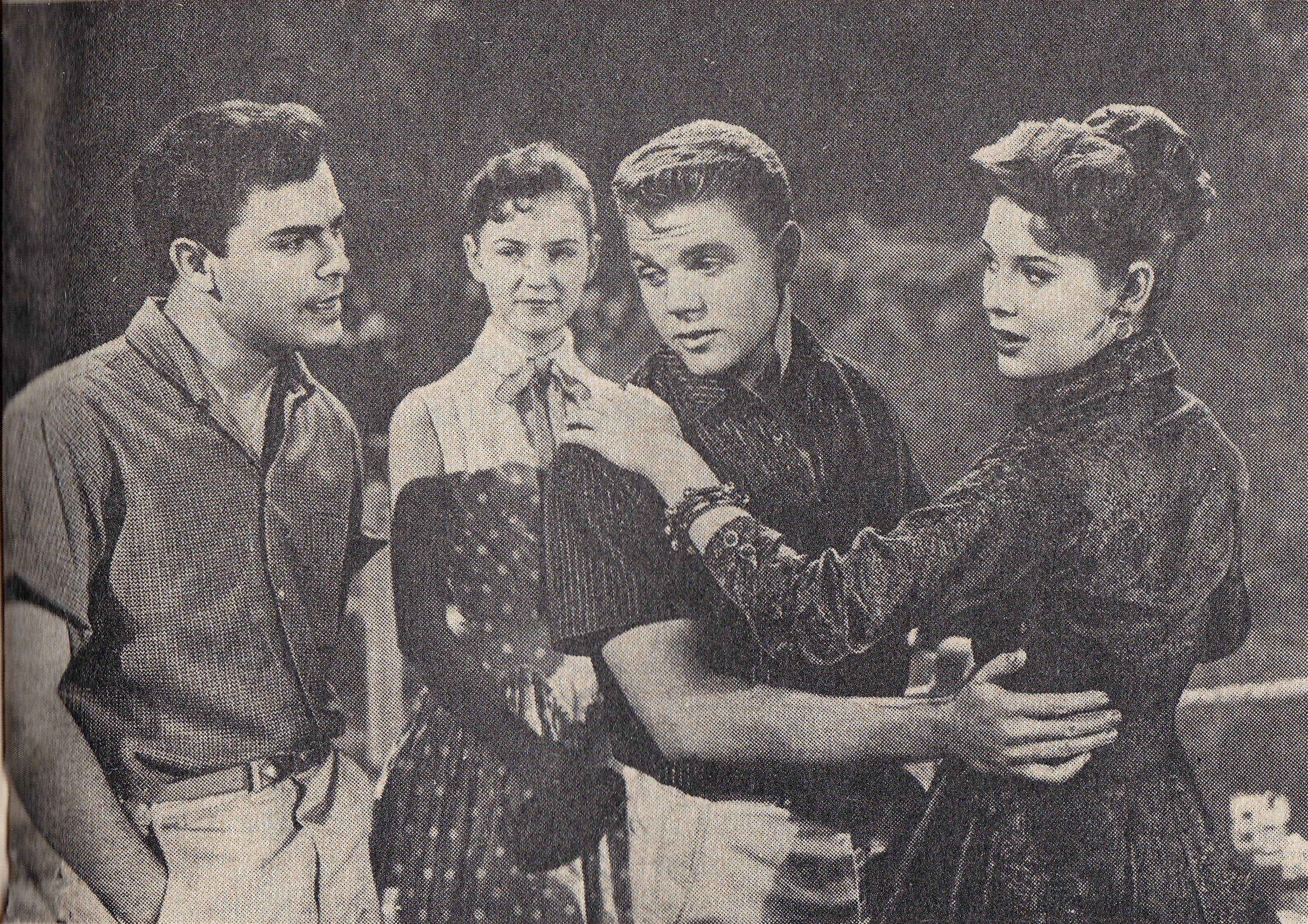
John Saxon, Shelley Fabares, Wilder and Jill St. John in Summer Love (1958)

Wilder's first stage role was a Geller Theatre Workshop production in Los Angeles Watch on the Rhine (1943). In films, he later played Freckles in the western Tumbleweed Trail (1946), starred alongside Ronald Reagan in Don Siegel's Night Unto Night (1949), and appeared as Duckface in the drama When I Grow Up (1951). He appeared in minor roles in Singin' in the Rain and The Pride of St. Louis (1952), and voiced the Raccoon Twins in Walt Disney Productions' Peter Pan (1953). In the mid-1950s, Wilder planned to abandon acting to pursue a baseball scholarship at the University of Southern California, but producer Ed Chevie persuaded him to appear in the film Rock, Pretty Baby (1956), which lead to roles in other films such as Hold Back the Night (1956), The Unguarded Moment (1956), Until They Sail (1957), and Imitation General (1958). By then, he had begun using the name "John Wilder", which he legally adopted in 1958.

In the early 1960s, Wilder decided to abandon acting, believing it to be unfulfilling and feeling he had no future in the profession. He began attending Santa Monica City College and later transferred to the University of California, Los Angeles. Chuck Connors, a friend of Wilder's who co-starred with him in Hold Back the Night, enlisted Wilder to write a script for his show The Rifleman. Wilder later wrote for Connors' series Branded, and afterwards wrote for the soap opera Peyton Place for several seasons. He wrote for The Streets of San Francisco in the 1970s, which earned him two nominations for the Outstanding Drama Series Primetime Emmy. Wilder served as the creator of The Yellow Rose and Spenser: For Hire, and was also the producer of the miniseries Centennial.

Wilder and his ex-wife, Carolyn Cunningham, have three children. He has worked as a professor at Westmont College since 2019.

== Filmography ==
=== Film ===
Year	Title	Role
1943	Watch on the Rhine	Boy (uncredited)
1946	Tumbleweed Trail	Freckles Ryan
1949	Night Unto Night	Willie Shawn
1950	Tea for Two	Richard Smith
1951	When I Grow Up	Duckface
1952	The Pride of St. Louis	Batboy
1952	Room for One More	Patrol Leader
1952	Singin' in the Rain	Boy
1953	Peter Pan	Raccoon Twins
1956	The First Texan	Soldier
1956	Hold Back the Night	Tinker
1956	Rock, Pretty Baby	'Fingers' Porter
1956	The Unguarded Moment	Sandy Krupp
1957	Until They Sail	Tommy
1958	Imitation General	Lieutenant Jeff Clayton
1958	Summer Love	Mike Howard
1960	Five Guns to Tombstone	Ted Wade

=== Television ===
==== As actor ====
Year	Series	Role	Notes
1951–1953	Big Town	Alan Donovan	Episodes: "Success Story", "On Their Own"
1953–1961	The Adventures of Ozzie and Harriet	Various	8 episodes
1954	Death Valley Days	Bill Spencer	Episode: "The Rainbow Chaser"
1955	The Stu Erwin Show	Teenager	Episode: "One of the Boys"
1955	The Loretta Young Show	Pete Preston	Episode: "The Refinement of 'Ab'"
1956	Crossroads	Smiley	Episode: "St. George and the Dragon"
1956	Studio 57	Don Baxter	Episode: "The Baxter Boy"
1956	Alfred Hitchcock Presents	Don	Season 2 Episode 10: "Jonathan"
1956–1957	The West Point Story	Cadet Jacoby; Cadet Wilson	Episode: "Officer's Wife"; Episode: "Backfire"
1956–1958	Navy Log	Steve Polachek; Lover	Episode: "The Plebe"; Episode: "The Soapbox Kid"
1957	Circus Boy	Anthony Gambino	Episode: "The Great Gambini's Son"
1957	The Adventures of Rin Tin Tin	Pete Benton	Episode: "Stagecoach Sally"
1957	Telephone Time	Dabney	Episode: "Pit-a-Pit and the Dragon"
1957	The Adventures of Jim Bowie	Dan Jeffers	Episode: "House Divided"
1958	Jane Wyman Presents	Jay Dee	Episode: "My Sister Susan"
1958	Broken Arrow	Ben Swallow	Episode: "The Duel"
1958	Wanted Dead or Alive	Joe Sands	Episode: "Die By the Gun"
1958	Rescue 8	Stan Smith	Episode: "Danger! 20,000 Volts"
1958	Hey, Jeannie!	Tom	Episode: "The Landlord"
1959	The Millionaire	Joe McGrath	Episode: "Millionaire Father Gillooly"
1959	The David Niven Show	Jerry	Episode: "Maggie Malone"
1959	Wagon Train	Stanley Blower	Episode: "The Elizabeth McQueeny Story"
1960	The Tom Ewell Show	Arthur Banning	Episode: "Salesmanship Lesson"
1961	The Barbara Stanwyck Show	Joe	Episode: "Call Me Annie"
1961	Perry Mason	Dick Wilson	Episode: "The Case of the Brazen Request"
1962	The Real McCoys	Soldier	Episode: "Money from Heaven"
1963	Petticoat Junction	Arthur Gilroy	Episode: "The Little Train Robbery"

==== As producer or writer ====
- The Rifleman
- Branded
- Peyton Place
- Paris 7000
- The Young Rebels
- Owen Marshall, Counselor at Law
- Marcus Welby, M.D.
- The Partridge Family
- Cade's County
- The Streets of San Francisco
- Most Wanted
- The Bastard
- Centennial
- The Devlin Connection
- The Mississippi
- The Yellow Rose
- Spenser: For Hire
- Return to Lonesome Dove
