= Roll, Thunder, Roll! =

1949 film by Lewis D. Collins

- Theatrical film poster
- Directed by: Lewis D. Collins
- Written by: Fred Harman; Paul Franklin
- Produced by: Jerry Thomas; Lincoln A. Widder; Jack Schwarz
- Starring: Jim Bannon; Don Reynolds; Emmett Lynn
- Cinematography: Gilbert Warrenton
- Edited by: Frank Baldridge
- Music by: Raoul Kraushaar
- Production company: Equity Pictures
- Distributed by: Eagle-Lion Films
- Release date: August 27, 1949
- Running time: 60 minutes
- Country: United States
- Language: English

Roll, Thunder, Roll! is a 1949 American Western film directed by Lewis D. Collins and starring Jim Bannon, Don Reynolds and Emmett Lynn. It was shot in Cinecolor. It is based on the Red Ryder series by Fred Harman, one of four films made by Eagle-Lion Films featuring the character.

== Cast ==
- Jim Bannon as Red Ryder
- Don Reynolds as Little Beaver
- Emmett Lynn as Buckskin
- Marin Sais as Duchess
- I. Stanford Jolley as El Conejo
- Nancy Gates as Carol Loomis
- Glenn Strange as Ace Hanlon
- Lee Morgan as Happy Loomis
- Lane Bradford as henchman Wolf
- Steve Pendleton as Marshal Bill Faugh
- Charles Stevens as Felipe, El Conejo rider
- William Fawcett as Josh Culvert
- Dorothy Latta as Dorothy Culvert
- Joseph J. Greene as townsman Pat
- Rocky Shahan as henchman
- Carol Henry as henchman
- George Chesebro as Ben Garson
