= Westward Bound (1944 film) =

1944 film by Robert Emmett Tansey

- Theatrical release poster
- Directed by: Robert Emmett Tansey
- Screenplay by: Elizabeth Beecher; Frances Kavanaugh
- Story by: Robert Emmett Tansey; Frances Kavanaugh
- Produced by: Robert Emmett Tansey
- Starring: Ken Maynard; Hoot Gibson; Bob Steele; Betty Miles; Harry Woods; Weldon Heyburn
- Cinematography: Marcel Le Picard
- Edited by: John C. Fuller
- Production company: Monogram Pictures
- Distributed by: Monogram Pictures
- Release date: January 17, 1944
- Running time: 54 minutes
- Country: United States
- Language: English

Westward Bound is a 1944 American Western film directed by Robert Emmett Tansey and written by Elizabeth Beecher and Frances Kavanaugh. The film stars Ken Maynard, Hoot Gibson, Bob Steele, Betty Miles, Harry Woods and Weldon Heyburn. The film was released on January 17, 1944, by Monogram Pictures.

== Cast ==
- Ken Maynard as Ken Maynard
- Hoot Gibson as Hoot Gibson
- Bob Steele as Bob Steele
- Betty Miles as Enid Barrett
- Harry Woods as Roger Caldwell
- Weldon Heyburn as Albert Lane
- Karl Hackett as Henry Wagner
- Hal Price as Jasper Tuttle
- John Bridges as Ira Phillips
- Roy Brent as Will
- Frank Ellis as Judd
- Curley Dresden as Monte
- Al Ferguson as Curley
- Charles Murray Jr. as Chip
- Dan White as Wade
- Horace B. Carpenter as Dr. Bernard Adrian
