= Badman's Gold =

1951 film by Robert Emmett Tansey

- Directed by: Robert Emmett Tansey
- Written by: Robert Emmett Tansey; Alyn Lockwood
- Produced by: Jack Schwarz; Robert Emmett Tansey
- Starring: Johnny Carpenter; Alyn Lockwood; Clarke Stevens
- Cinematography: Clark Ramsey
- Edited by: Redge Browne
- Music by: Darrell Calker
- Production company: Jack Schwarz Productions
- Distributed by: Eagle-Lion Classics
- Release date: April 3, 1951
- Running time: 56 minutes
- Country: United States
- Language: English

Badman's Gold is a 1951 American Western film directed by Robert Emmett Tansey and starring Johnny Carpenter, Alyn Lockwood and Clarke Stevens.

== Plot ==
A federal marshal is summoned to investigate a series of robberies of stagecoaches containing shipments of gold.

== Cast ==
- Johnny Carpenter as Johnny Carpenter
- Alyn Lockwood as Bess Benson
- Clarke Stevens as Bob Benson
- Kenne Duncan as Rance
- Vern Teters as Sheriff Masters
- Jack Daly as Professor
- Emmett Lynn as Wiggins - Miner
- Bill Chaney as Shorty - Henchman
- Bill Chandler as Bart - Henchman
- Quentin Sondergaard as Rambo - Henchman
- Frank Marlowe as Jake - Henchman
- John Hamilton as The Marshal
- Bob Reich as Jeff

== Bibliography ==
- Pitts, Michael R. Western Movies: A Guide to 5,105 Feature Films. McFarland, 2012.
