= When I Grow Up (film) =

1951 film by Michael Kanin

- Theatrical release poster
- Directed by: Michael Kanin
- Screenplay by: Michael Kanin
- Produced by: Sam Spiegel
- Starring: Bobby Driscoll; Robert Preston; Martha Scott; Sherry Jackson; Johnny McGovern; Frances Chaney
- Cinematography: Ernest Laszlo
- Edited by: Edward Mann; Bruce Schoengarth
- Music by: Jerome Moross
- Production company: Horizon Pictures
- Distributed by: Eagle-Lion Classics; United Artists
- Release date: May 4, 1951 (Los Angeles)
- Running time: 90 minutes
- Country: United States
- Language: English

When I Grow Up is a 1951 American drama film written and directed by Michael Kanin and starring Bobby Driscoll, Robert Preston, Martha Scott and Charley Grapewin. The film was produced by Sam Spiegel through his Horizon Pictures and distributed by United Artists.

== Cast ==
- Bobby Driscoll as Josh / Danny Reed
- Robert Preston as Father Reed
- Martha Scott as Mother Reed
- Sherry Jackson as Ruthie Reed
- Johnny McGovern as Duckface Kelly
- Frances Chaney as Mrs. Kelly
- Poodles Hanneford as Bobo
- Ralph Dumke as Carp
- Paul Guilfoyle as Doc
- Paul Levitt as Carp's Assistant
- Griff Barnett as Dr. Bailey
- Margaret Lloyd as Volunteer Nurse
- Charley Grapewin as Grandpa Reed
- Harry Morgan as Father Reed
- Elisabeth Fraser as Mother Reed
- Robert Hyatt as Binks
- Hamilton Camp as Bully
- Ruth Lee as Bully's Mother
- Donald Gordon as Harmonica Boy

== Reception ==
Critic Edwin Schallert of the Los Angeles Times called the film "a very worthy nostalgic picture" that "catches the unique spirit of boyhood in America before the turn of the century".
