= De Havilland Law =

California labor law ruling

The De Havilland Law, formally De Haviland v. Warner Bros. Pictures, is a published judicial opinion interpreting California Labor Code Section 2855, a California law which prevents a court from enforcing specific performance of an exclusive personal services contract (i.e., contracts creating a non-delegable duty on the part of an individual to another party, and no other, to render certain services) beyond the term of seven calendar years from the commencement of service.

The section was first enacted as part of the new Labor Code in 1937. It was a recodification of an older statute, Civil Code Section 1980, which had been enacted as part of the original California Civil Code in 1872. The statute had originally provided for a two-year limit on specific enforcement, but the limit was amended in 1931 to seven years.

== Background ==
Hollywood industry lawyers in the 1920s, 1930s, and 1940s took the position that an exclusive personal services contract should be treated as suspended during the periods when the artist was not actually working. Since no artist could be working every single day (that is, including holidays and weekends), this interpretation meant that two, or later seven, years of actual service would be spread over a much longer calendar period, thus extending the time during which the studio system had complete control of a young artist's career.

In response, actress Olivia de Havilland, backed by the Screen Actors Guild, filed a lawsuit on August 23, 1943, against Warner Bros. De Havilland was fed up with being typecast by Warners as an ingénue and strongly preferred the other kinds of roles she had been given when she had been able to convince the studio to loan her out to other studios. The lawsuit resulted in a landmark decision of the California Court of Appeal for the Second District in de Havilland's favor on December 8, 1944. In a unanimous opinion signed by Justice Clement Lawrence Shinn, the three-justice panel adopted the common sense view that seven years from the commencement of service means seven calendar years. Since de Havilland had started performance under her Warner annual contract on May 5, 1936 (which had been renewed six times pursuant to its terms since then), and seven calendar years had elapsed from that date, the contract was no longer enforceable and she was free to seek projects with other studios. (The court misspelled de Havilland's last name, meaning that the case was published as De Haviland.)

De Havilland's legal victory reduced the power of the studios and extended greater creative freedom to performers, starting with herself. Although Jack Warner tried to discourage other studios from hiring her, she eventually found work with Paramount Pictures, where she won her first Best Actress Oscar for To Each His Own (1946). The Court of Appeal's decision in de Havilland's favor was one of the most significant and far-reaching legal rulings in Hollywood. The decision came to be informally known, and is still known to this day, as the "De Havilland Law".

While today's film and TV actors have enjoyed the higher compensation and greater creative freedom intended by Section 2855, music artists have not. Jared Leto and Shannon Leto of the band Thirty Seconds to Mars credit the De Havilland law with resolving their music contract issue in 2009, which sets a precedent for music artists and Section 2855. In 2015, British singer Rita Ora also cited the De Havilland Law in her complaint while seeking release from her American label. They eventually reached a settlement.

== Notable applications ==
Johnny Carson, then host of The Tonight Show, used the De Havilland law to break his contract with NBC and began aggressively considering a bid from rival network ABC; although he ultimately decided to remain with NBC, his use of the law allowed him to extract major concessions from the network, including a reduced workload, increase in pay and ownership of the show.

In August 2008, during the recording process of its third studio album, the band Thirty Seconds to Mars attempted to sign with a new label, prompting EMI (the parent label of Virgin), to file a $30 million breach of contract lawsuit. After nearly a year of legal battles, the band announced on April 28, 2009, that the suit had been settled following a defense based on the De Havilland law. Afterwards, Jared Leto visited de Havilland to thank her in person for her courage in bringing such an important legal case, and she shared with the news media her delight at learning that her case was still helping new generations to break out of their contracts.
