= Emmett Lynn =

American actor (1897–1958)

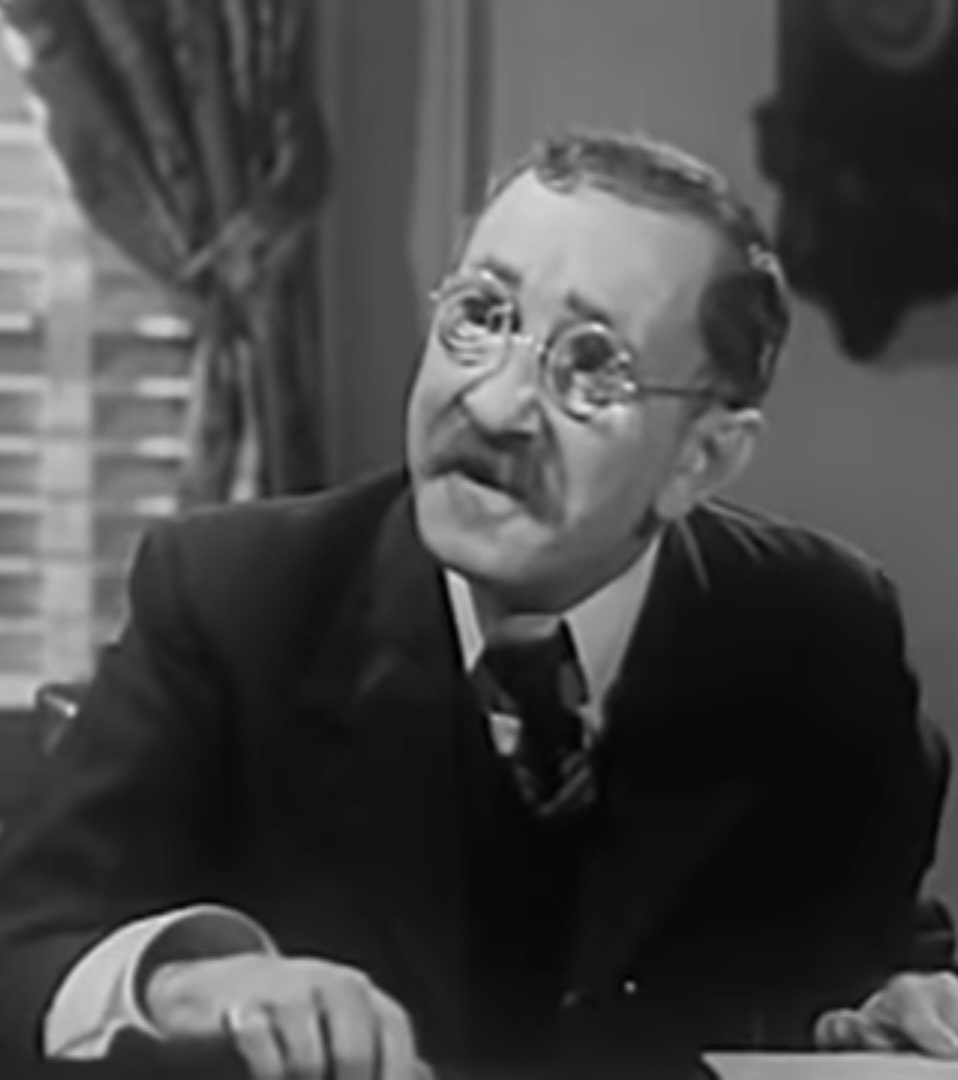
- Lynn in Girls in Chains (1943)
- Born: Emmett Earl Lynn; February 14, 1897; Muscatine, Iowa, U.S.
- Died: October 20, 1958 (aged 61); Hollywood, California, U.S.
- Occupation: Actor
- Years active: 1940–1958

Emmett Earl Lynn (February 14, 1897 – October 20, 1958) was an American actor of the stage and screen.

== Early life ==
Lynn was born in Muscatine, Iowa. When he was nine years old, Lynn became a song plugger in Denver, Colorado. From that beginning he moved to performing in a children's revue. Gus Edwards spotted Lynn and put him in a production of Edwards' School Days. Lynn served in the Army during World War I.

== Career ==
An eccentric character comedian in vaudeville, he later produced travelling road companies known variously as the Novelty Players, the Emmett Lynn Musical Comedy Company and the Emmett Lynn Players, of which he was its star comedian and usually billed as "Emmett 'Pap' Lynn; his troupes flourished in the 1920s and early 1930s. By 1935, he was just one of the comedians in a travelling musical revue called The Passing Show.

Lynn began working in films for Biograph Studios in 1913. On screen, Lynn appeared in over 140 films between 1940 and 1956. He made several television appearances from 1949 until his death, especially in westerns. He was featured in nine episodes of The Lone Ranger during the final decade of his life.

On Broadway, Lynn appeared in Gasoline Gypsies (1931).

Near the end of his career, Lynn was cast as Uncle Birdie in the 1955 film classic The Night of the Hunter, but director Charles Laughton did not like his performance and replaced him with James Gleason during filming.

== Death ==
He died in Hollywood, California from ventricular fibrillation due to a coronary occlusion.

== Selected filmography ==
- Grandpa Goes to Town (1940)
- Wagon Train (1940)
- Robbers of the Range (1941)
- The Spoilers (1942)
- Westward Ho (1942)
- Outlaws of Pine Ridge (1942)
- Queen of Broadway (1942)
- In Old California (1942)
- Days of Old Cheyenne (1943)
- Frontier Outlaws (1944)
- The Yoke's on Me (1944)
- The Town Went Wild (1944)
- Swing Hostess (1944) - Blodgett
- Shadow of Terror (1945)
- Gangster's Den (1945)
- Landrush (1946)
- Code of the West (1947)
- Oregon Trail Scouts (1947)
- Trail of the Mounties (1947)
- Grand Canyon Trail (1948)
- Ride, Ryder, Ride! (1949)
- The Fighting Redhead (1949)
- Roll, Thunder, Roll! (1949)
- The Traveling Saleswoman (1950)
- Badman's Gold (1951)
- Desert Pursuit (1952)
- Lone Star (1952) - Josh
- Skirts Ahoy! (1952)
- Northern Patrol (1953)
- The Homesteaders (1953)
- Bait (1954)
- Ring of Fear (1954)
- Stranger on Horseback (1955)

== Selected television ==
Year	Title	Role	Notes
1949	The Lone Ranger	Banty Bishop	Episode "Legion of Old Timers"
1952	Death Valley Days	Pop	Episode "The Little Bullfrog Nugget"
1953	The Adventures of Ozzie and Harriet	Pop Gibson	Episode "Who's Walter?"
1958	The Adventures of Ozzie and Harriet	Hank	Episode "Rick's Riding Lesson"
1959	The Adventures of Rin Tin Tin	Borrowin' Sam	Episode "The Luck of O'Hara"
