= The Counterfeiters (1948 film) =

1948 film by Sam Newfield

- Theatrical release poster
- Directed by: Sam Newfield
- Screenplay by: Fred Myton; Barbara Worth
- Story by: Maurice Conn
- Produced by: Maurice Conn
- Starring: John Sutton; Doris Merrick; Hugh Beaumont; Lon Chaney Jr. George O'Hanlon; Robert Kent
- Cinematography: James S. Brown Jr.
- Edited by: Martin G. Cohn; Harry Coswick
- Music by: Irving Gertz
- Production company: 20th Century Fox
- Distributed by: 20th Century Fox
- Release date: May 28, 1948
- Running time: 73 minutes
- Country: United States
- Language: English

The Counterfeiters is a 1948 American crime film directed by Sam Newfield and written by Fred Myton and Barbara Worth. The film stars John Sutton, Doris Merrick, Hugh Beaumont, Lon Chaney Jr., George O'Hanlon and Robert Kent. The film was released on May 28, 1948, by 20th Century Fox.

== Synopsis ==
A Treasury agent on the trail of an international gang of counterfeiters joins forces with Inspector Jeff MacAllister, a visiting officer from Scotland Yard.

== Cast ==
- John Sutton as Inspector Jeff MacAllister
- Doris Merrick as Margo Talbot
- Hugh Beaumont as Philip Drake
- Lon Chaney Jr. as Louie Struber
- George O'Hanlon as Frankie Dodge
- Robert Kent as Tony Richards
- Herbert Rawlinson as Norman Talbot
- Pierre Watkin as Carter
- Don C. Harvey as Dan Taggart
- Fred Coby as Piper
- Joi Lansing as Caroline
- Scott Brady as Jerry McGee
