= The Dixie Merchant =

1926 film

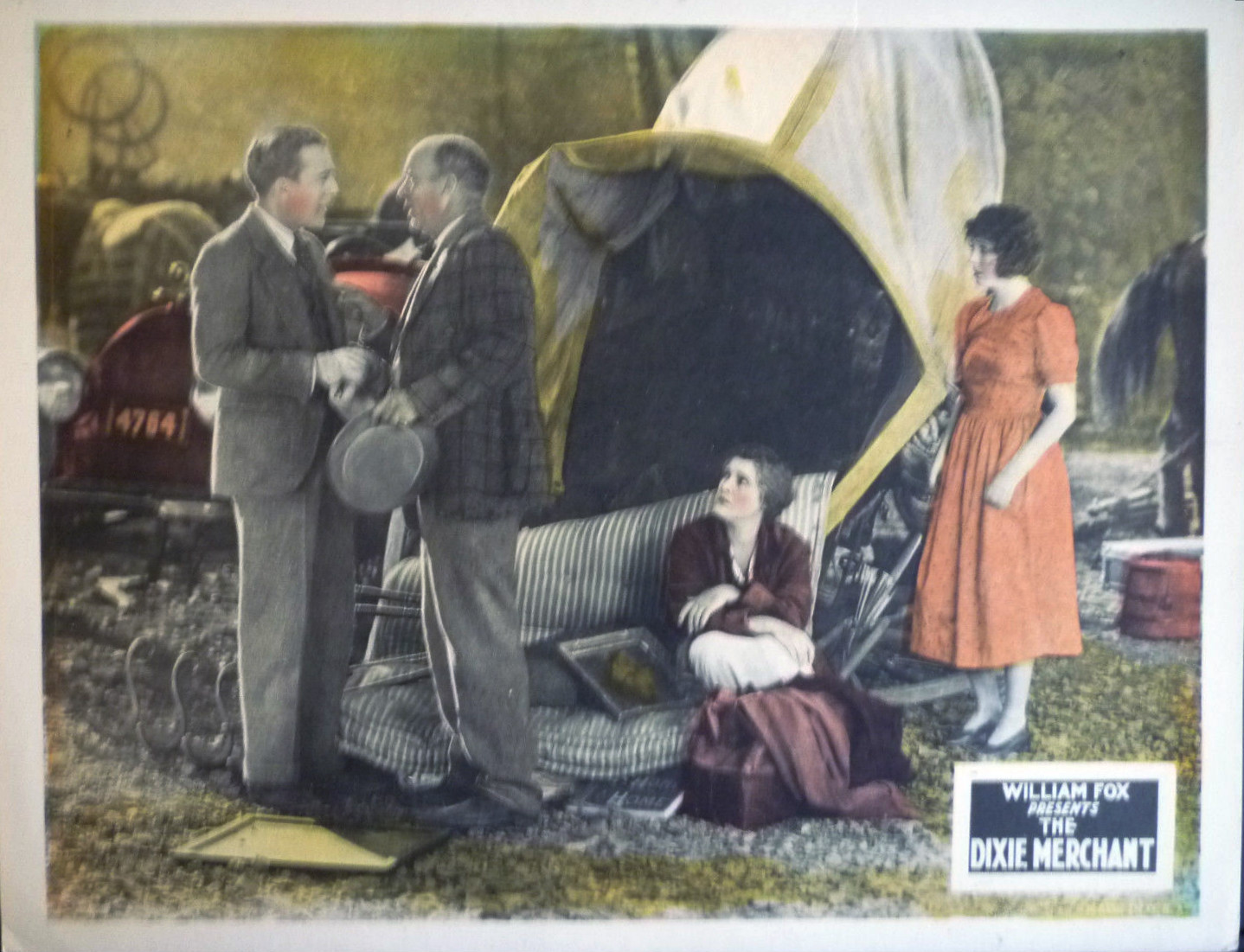
- Lobby card
- Directed by: Frank Borzage
- Written by: Kenneth B. Clarke
- Based on: The Chicken-Wagon Family by Barry Benefield
- Produced by: William Fox
- Starring: Jack Mulhall; Madge Bellamy; J. Farrell MacDonald
- Cinematography: Frank B. Good
- Production company: Fox Film
- Distributed by: Fox Film
- Release date: March 7, 1926
- Running time: 6 reels
- Country: United States
- Languages: Silent; English intertitles

The Dixie Merchant is a 1926 American silent drama film directed by Frank Borzage and starring Jack Mulhall, Madge Bellamy, and J. Farrell MacDonald.

== Plot ==
As described in a film magazine review, Jimmy Pickett falls in love with Aida Fippany, whose father is interested only in Marseillaise, a filly. Aida thinks Jimmy is trifling with her and she and her mother decide to go live with a relative. Fippany, disconsolate, sells Marseilliase to Jimmy's father and disappears. Jimmy finds Aida and convinces her of his love. Marseillaise, badly driven, loses a heat in a race. Fippany appears and drives her to victory, and then is reunited with his wife Josephine.

== Cast ==
- Jack Mulhall as Jimmy Pickett
- Madge Bellamy as Aida Fippany
- J. Farrell MacDonald as Jean Paul Fippany
- Claire McDowell as Josephine Fippany
- Harvey Clark as Baptiste
- Edward Martindel as John Pickett
- Evelyn Arden as Minnie Jordan
- Onest Conley as Eph
- Paul Panzer as Whitcomb

== Bibliography ==
- Solomon, Aubrey. The Fox Film Corporation, 1915-1935: A History and Filmography. McFarland, 2011.
