= The Big Noise (1944 film) =

1944 film by Malcolm St. Clair

- Theatrical poster
- Directed by: Malcolm St. Clair
- Written by: Scott Darling
- Produced by: Sol M. Wurtzel
- Starring: Stan Laurel; Oliver Hardy; Doris Merrick; Arthur Space; Veda Ann Borg; Robert Blake; Frank Fenton
- Cinematography: Joseph MacDonald
- Edited by: Norman Colbert
- Music by: David Buttolph
- Distributed by: 20th Century Fox
- Release date: September 22, 1944
- Running time: 72 minutes
- Country: United States
- Language: English
- Box office: $750,000

The Big Noise is a 1944 comedy film starring the comedic duo Laurel and Hardy. It was produced by Sol M. Wurtzel and directed by Mal St. Clair.

== Plot ==
Laurel and Hardy, janitors at a detective agency, become embroiled in a caper involving a bomb dubbed "The Big Noise." Impersonating detectives, they befriend the bomb's inventor, navigating his idiosyncrasies alongside his quirky relatives. Meanwhile, neighboring criminals scheme to pilfer the explosive device.

To safeguard the bomb, Laurel and Hardy ingeniously conceal it within a concertina. When the criminals attempt a theft, the duo thwarts them temporarily. However, a mix-up occurs, and they inadvertently end up with the genuine bomb, entrusted with delivering it to Washington, D.C.

Their journey encounters various mishaps, including a misguided train berth and a hitchhiking escapade. A fortuitous ride with Glassman turns perilous when they are stopped for speeding, forcing them to flee into open terrain. Seeking refuge in an airplane, they unknowingly board a military target aircraft, narrowly escaping via parachute over the Pacific Ocean. In a stroke of luck, they dispose of the bomb by dropping it onto a Japanese submarine.

As they await rescue on a buoy, they serenade themselves with music from the concertina, amusingly observing a school of fish dancing in synchrony.

== Cast ==
- Stan Laurel as Stanley
- Oliver Hardy as Oliver
- Doris Merrick as Evelyn
- Arthur Space as Alva P. Hartley
- Veda Ann Borg as Mayme Charlton
- Robert Blake as Egbert Hartle (as Bobby Blake)
- Frank Fenton as Charlton
- James Bush as Hartman

Uncredited Cast:

- Esther Howard as Aunt Sophie
- Philip Van Zandt as Dutchy Glassman
- Robert Dudley as Grandpa
- Edgar Dearing as Motorcycle Cop
- Dell Henderson as Train Passenger
- Francis Ford as Train Station Agent
- Jack Norton as Drunk on Train

== Production ==
The Big Noise constituted the fifth installment among Laurel and Hardy's six feature films produced at 20th Century Fox during the 1940s. Stan Laurel, in an interview during the film's production, underscored their commitment to aligning with the American World War II home front efforts, opting to eschew gags involving wastage and destruction. "We cut out automobile chases and food wasting-gags when the war first started," Laurel was quoted as saying, "and with The Big Noise we decided to slash every gag that might conceivably have bearing on wartime wastages and destruction".

Previous comedic material from Laurel and Hardy's repertoire, including segments from films such as Berth Marks, Wrong Again (both 1929), Block-Heads (1938) and The Flying Deuces (1939) found reincarnation within The Big Noise.

Laurel, endeavoring to infuse novelty into the production, proposed repurposing a claustrophobic train berth scene from Berth Marks onto a transcontinental airplane setting. Despite his suggestion being declined by producer Sol M. Wurtzel, the film incorporated fresh elements, notably introducing comic actor Jack Norton as a drunken fellow traveler sharing the berth with Laurel and Hardy.

Certain scenes were filmed at the Atchison, Topeka & Santa Fe Railway (AT&SF) station in Arcadia, California, providing authenticity to the railroad station ambiance. Notably, the station agent's interaction with Laurel and Hardy occurs against the backdrop of the railroad interlocking tower, an iconic feature safeguarding the crossing of Pacific Electric railway and AT&SF tracks. Additionally, filming took place at the Monrovia Airport in Monrovia, California, contributing to the film's varied locales.

== Critical and popular reception ==
The Big Noise was greeted with mixed reviews when it was first released in 1944. Some dismissed the film as a routine rehash of old gags; Bosley Crowther of The New York Times observed, "Once, long ago, it was funny to see them joust with wet paint and folding beds. But now it is dull and pathetic. And they don't even seem to care." Others approved of the film, like Boxoffice magazine: "So long as Laurel and Hardy continue their screen antics, there will always be something for the children to enjoy — not to mention the grownups who find this comedy team relaxing entertainment... All in all, this should disappoint no one, including the person who counts the box office take." The latter comment proved prophetic, as the film was very successful in theaters and hailed by exhibitors as one of Laurel & Hardy's best. The film stayed in circulation for the next six years, and was reissued in 1954.

The film had a poor reputation for many years, gaining an entry in the book The Fifty Worst Films of All Time in 1978, though attitudes to the film have somewhat improved in later years, with John V. Brennan at the website Laurel and Hardy Central stating "The Big Noise is better than its reputation, but given that reputation, it would almost have to be."

== See also ==
- List of American films of 1944
