= Zamba (film) =

1949 film directed by William Berke

- Directed by: William Berke
- Screenplay by: Barbara Worth
- Produced by: Maurice Conn
- Starring: Jon Hall; Beau Bridges
- Cinematography: James S. Brown Jr.
- Production company: Fortune Films
- Distributed by: Eagle-Lion Films
- Release date: November 1949
- Country: United States
- Language: English

Zamba (also known as Zamba, the Gorilla) is a 1949 American adventure film directed by William Berke and starring Jon Hall and Beau Bridges. It was written by Barbara Worth.

== Plot ==
Jenny and her son, Tommy, are flying over the Belgian Congo. They are forced to jump out of the plane and become separated from each other. Jenny is rescued by a safari. The six year old Tommy is found by Zamba, a gorilla, who adopts him.

== Cast ==
- Jon Hall as Steve O'Malley
- June Vincent as Jenny Duncan
- George Cooper as Doug
- Jane Nigh as Caro
- George O'Hanlon as Marvin
- Ray "Crash" Corrigan as Zamba
- Beau Bridges as Tommy Duncan
- Pierre Watkin as Benton
- Harry Lauter as Jim
- Alphonse Martell as Gaston

== Production ==
Zamba was made at Nassour Studios. It was released through Eagle-Lion Films.

== Reception ==
The Monthly Film Bulletin called the film "Preposterous."

Variety wrote: "Zamba is the type of manufacfured jungle thriller that can catch a moderate amount of coin when given flashy bookings in some grind situations. Otherwise, it's a mild secondary feature for minor houses, rating attention only from the moppets. ... Jon Hall stars as a stalwart jungle trapper and has to fight the clumsy dialog in the Barbara Worth script as well as the animals. June Vincent manages a somewhat better appearance as the mother. Beau Bridges is adequate as the kid and Jane Nigh is out of place in her role of Miss Vincent's sister. George O'Hanlon struggles unsuccessfully with the script's comedy intents, Ray Corrigan dons his stock hair coat to portray the kindly Zamba who shelters young Bridges. William Berke's direction tries hard to sharpen story and action values."

Boxoffice wrote: "Okay for the matinee trade and the grind houses, this adventure yarn of Africa com do little more in the majority of situations than barely get by as the supporting feature. Specializing in stock footage of the dark continent's fauna – much of which is interesting despite the fact it has been seen before in countless pictures – the library shots are patched together with a yarn that is/neither exciting nor natural. The assembly is edited so obviously that only the juveniles and the naive will fail to recognize just where the stock ends and the Hollywood exposures begin. Resultantly, the cast – which, parenthetically, has some marquee value – isn't given an opportunity to show at its best advantage."

The Los Angeles Times wrote: "Beau Bridges does a nice job as the kid" and "Jon Hall is engaging conscientious as the hero."
