= The Country Beyond (1936 film) =

1936 film by Eugene Forde

- Theatrical release poster
- Directed by: Eugene Forde
- Screenplay by: Adele Comandini; Lamar Trotti
- Story by: James Oliver Curwood
- Produced by: Sol M. Wurtzel; Darryl F. Zanuck
- Starring: Rochelle Hudson; Paul Kelly; Robert Kent; Alan Hale, Sr. Alan Dinehart; Andrew Tombes
- Cinematography: Barney McGill
- Edited by: Fred Allen
- Music by: R.H. Bassett
- Production company: 20th Century Fox
- Distributed by: 20th Century Fox
- Release date: April 24, 1936
- Running time: 73 minutes
- Country: United States
- Language: English

The Country Beyond is a 1936 American drama film directed by Eugene Forde and written by Adele Comandini and Lamar Trotti. The film stars Rochelle Hudson, Paul Kelly, Robert Kent, Alan Hale, Sr., Alan Dinehart and Andrew Tombes. The film was released on April 24, 1936, by 20th Century Fox.

== Cast ==
- Rochelle Hudson as Jean Alison
- Paul Kelly as Sgt. Cassidy
- Robert Kent as Cpl. Robert King
- Alan Hale, Sr. as Jim Alison
- Alan Dinehart as Ray Jennings
- Andrew Tombes as Sen. Rawlings
- Claudia Coleman as Mrs. Rawlings
- Matt McHugh as Const. Weller
- Paul McVey as Fred Donaldson
- Holmes Herbert as Insp. Reed
