= Waco (1952 film) =

1952 American film

- Theatrical film poster
- Directed by: Lewis D. Collins
- Written by: Daniel B. Ullman
- Produced by: Vincent M. Fennelly
- Starring: Wild Bill Elliott; I. Stanford Jolley; Pamela Blake
- Cinematography: Ernest Miller
- Edited by: Sam Fields
- Music by: Raoul Kraushaar
- Production company: Silvermine Productions
- Distributed by: Monogram Pictures
- Release date: February 24, 1952
- Running time: 68 minutes
- Country: United States
- Language: English

Waco is a 1952 American Western film directed by Lewis D. Collins and starring Wild Bill Elliott, I. Stanford Jolley and Pamela Blake. The film was distributed by Monogram Pictures as a second feature. The film's sets were designed by the art director Martin Obzina. It was shot at the Iverson Ranch.

== Plot ==
The inhabitants of Waco in Texas employ a gunfighter to clean up the town.

== Cast ==
- Wild Bill Elliott as Matt Boone
- I. Stanford Jolley as Curly Ivers
- Pamela Blake as Kathy Clark
- Paul Fierro as Lou Garcia
- Rand Brooks as Al - henchman
- Richard Avonde as Pedro - henchman
- Pierce Lyden as Farley
- Lane Bradford as Wallace
- Terry Frost as Will Richards
- Stanley Price as Sheriff of Waco
- Stanley Andrews as judge
- Michael Whalen as Barnes - banker
- Ray Bennett as Bull Clark
- Rory Mallinson as Crawford
- Dick Paxton as Ace Logan
- Russ Whiteman as Sheriff of Pecos
- House Peters Jr. as doctor

== Bibliography ==
- Martin, Len D. (2001) [1993]. The Allied Artists Checklist: The Feature Films and Short Subjects of Allied Artists Pictures Corporation, 1947-1978. McFarland & Company. p. 158. ISBN 0786411139.
