= Dragnet (1947 film) =

1947 film directed by Leslie Goodwins

- Directed by: Leslie Goodwins
- Written by: Harry Essex; Barbara Worth
- Produced by: Maurice Conn; David Permut
- Starring: Henry Wilcoxon; Mary Brian; Douglass Dumbrille; Virginia Dale; Don C. Harvey and Ralph Dunn
- Cinematography: James S. Brown Jr.
- Edited by: William D. Gordeon; Richard Halsey
- Music by: Irving Gertz
- Production company: Fortune Film Corporation
- Distributed by: Screen Guild Productions
- Release date: August 16, 1947
- Running time: 71 minutes
- Country: United States
- Language: English

Dragnet is a 1947 American crime film directed by Leslie Goodwins and starring Henry Wilcoxon, Mary Brian, Douglass Dumbrille, Virginia Dale, Don C. Harvey, and Ralph Dunn. The screenplay was written by Barbara Worth and Harry Essex. The original music score was composed by Irving Gertz.

It is also known as Dark Bullet and A Shot in the Dark.

== Plot summary ==
A dead John Doe is found on the beach and Detective Lieutenant Tony Ricco gets the case to solve. With no clues whatsoever to the case, Tony asks for help to Geoffrey James, an old friend from Scotland Yard in London.

After examining the body and the man's clothes, Geoffrey concludes he wore a Harris Tweed coat and had Sterling pound notes on him, and therefore has to be of British origin. Geoffrey also discovers a fluorescent paint on the coat, which would suggest it is the same paint as the one used to mark floating objects in water to easier spot and rescue them. The dead man had no water in his lungs, so he had not drowned, but maybe got the paint on him by picking something up from the water, for example a life jacket.

Geoffrey goes to the site on the beach where the body was found and discovers a life jacket as suggested, in a beachcomber shack. He puts it on over his own coat, but then he is suddenly attacked by the beachcomber. A strange woman also appears with the beachcomber. Geoffrey easily fends off the attack and holds the man and the strange woman, who does not want to reveal her name to him. Instead, she runs away from him.

Geoffrey runs after the woman, but is knocked down by her friend. When he wakes up again, the life jacket is gone. Geoffrey changes tactics and looks into all the flights over the Atlantic Ocean in the last few days, and eventually finds one where the bathroom window had been broken during the flight. He gets a beautiful flight attendant, Anne Hogan, to identify John Doe at the morgue as a Mr. Rodine, who worked as a diplomat and could pass through customs unchecked.

He meets with Tony again, and the American colleague presents a theory about Geoff being in the U.S. to track down the gang members who were behind a very large hit on a jewelry store. Geoffrey confesses that he indeed suspects Mr. Rodine of involvement in the theft. He guesses that Rodine could have dropped the jewels into the ocean from the plane, using a life jacket to hold them afloat.

When Geoffrey speaks to the British consul, he finds out that Rodine was killed a few days ago, long before the flight took place. Thus, the police still have no clue as to who was found dead on the beach.

Geoffrey and the flight attendant go on a search for the supposed seaplane that could have been used to pick up the jewels from the surface. They find that a pilot named Joe King has flown a plane with Rodine out to sea to retrieve the jewels. When they later meet the strange woman from the beach, the flight attendant identifies her as one Irene Trilling, who was also a passenger on the same flight as the man pretending to be Mr. Rodine.

Irene runs off again, but her friend is another passenger from the flight, whose name is Frank Farrington. When they talk to the pilot, he finally identifies the man posing as Mr. Rodine as Louis Gannet, a known criminal and confidence game artist. King also tells them that he witnessed Farrington kill Gannet after they had retrieved the jewels. Farrington then seemed to believe that King had taken the jewels from Gannet.

Since neither Farrington nor King has the jewels, someone else must have taken them. Geoffrey guesses that the beachcomber might have found them together with the life jacket, and goes back to the shack to look. He finds the jewels hidden in a lobster tank and takes them with him to Anne, the flight attendant, who has gone to find Irene and Farrington.

Farrington suspects that Gannet and Irene were trying to trick him, and he shoots and kills Irene before Geoffrey and Anne arrive. He also tries to kill Geoffrey, but he is saved by Blake, an undercover policeman who has posed as a drunk and kept an eye on the Briton during the investigation.

== Cast ==
- Henry Wilcoxon as Inspector Geoffrey James
- Mary Brian as Anne Hogan
- Douglass Dumbrille as Frank Farrington
- Virginia Dale as Irene Trilling
- Robert Kent as Police Lt. Ricco (as Douglas Blackley)
- Tom Fadden as Amos Wright
- Don C. Harvey as Police Sgt. Blake (as Don Harvey)
- Maxine Semon as Molly
- Ralph Dunn as Police Sgt. Martin
- Bert Conway as Police Officer
- Douglas Evans as Radio Announcer
- Paul Newlan as Henchman
- Allan Nixon as Gang Member
- Edward Earle as District Attorney
