= Grand Old Girl =

1935 film directed by John Robertson

- Directed by: John Robertson
- Screenplay by: Milton Krims; John Twist; Arthur T. Horman
- Story by: Wanda Tuchock
- Produced by: Cliff Reid
- Starring: May Robson; Mary Carlisle; Fred MacMurray; Alan Hale
- Cinematography: Lucien Andriot
- Edited by: George Crone
- Music by: Albert Colombo
- Production company: RKO Radio Pictures
- Release date: January 18, 1935 (US)
- Running time: 72 minutes
- Country: United States
- Language: English

Grand Old Girl is a 1935 American drama film directed by John Robertson from a screenplay by Milton Krims, John Twist, Arthur T. Horman, adapted from a story by Wanda Tuchock. The film stars May Robson, Mary Carlisle, Fred MacMurray, and Alan Hale, other cast members included Ben Alexander.

== Plot ==
Laura Bayles has been a devoted educator for 38 years. Over that time she has risen to become the principal of Avondale High School. When a local petty gambler, "Click" Dade, begins to prey on her students, she takes a leading position in an attempt to force the gambling location to close down. Dade had been one of her former pupils. Her efforts are opposed by two local politicians, Holland and Joseph Killaine. Holland is a small time political boss, while Killaine is the superintendent of schools. So Bayles decides to fight fire with fire. With a stake of $250, and a pair of Dade's own loaded dice, she wins enough money to open a club to compete with Dade's, taking away his business. However, after an incident in which Killaine's daughter, Gerry, causes a fight at Bayles' club, causing the club's closure. Killaine then presses his advantage, demanding that Bayles also resign as principal, which will make her ineligible for a pension, being two years short of retirement.

Upon hearing of her fate, Gerry goes to Bayles to apologize for her actions, and their result. An apology which Bayles accepts. Meanwhile, Dade has contacted another one of Bayles' former pupils, Gavin Gordon, who has risen to become President of the United States. Gordon is on a tour of the country and is in the area of his old hometown. After Dade also apologizes to Bayles, the President arrives at the school and delivers a sentimental speech extolling the virtues of the education profession, motherhood, and Mrs. Bayles. Her job is saved.

== Cast ==
- May Robson - Laura Bayles
- Mary Carlisle - Gerry Killaine
- Fred MacMurray - Sandy
- Alan Hale - Click Dade
- Etienne Girardot - Mellis
- William Burress - Butts
- Hale Hamilton - Killaine
- Edward Van Sloan - Holland
- Fred Kohler Jr. - Bill Belden
- Onest Conley - Neptune

== Production ==
RKO announced in September 1934 that the start of production was imminent for Portrait of Laura Bayles, which was one of the working titles for this film. It was reported in early October that the film was in production for RKO, and by the end of the month it had finished production and was in the process of being edited. In the middle of November, it was revealed that the title of the picture had been changed to Grand Old Girl.

By the end of 1934, the release date of the film was announced to be January 18. Early in February 1935 the general release date for the film was revealed as February 22, and would open at the Astor Theatre.

In March, the film was part of a four-picture deal sold to the Gaumont British circuit for distribution in the United Kingdom. The other three pictures included in the deal were the Katharine Hepburn vehicle, The Little Minister, Red Morning, featuring Steffi Duna, and Romance in Manhattan, starring Francis Lederer and Ginger Rogers.

== Reception ==
The Film Daily felt the film was worth watching, calling it a "Neat little human interest story", they rated the cinematography A-1, and said the direction was first rate. May Robson, they said, had found her "ideal role". Motion Picture Daily also enjoyed the film, extolling the expert direction of John Robertson, felt Robson's performance was outstanding. They felt Andriot's photography was good, and enjoyed the performances of Hale, Girardot, and Gordon. Overall, they felt the film was "entertainment for the entire family."

== Notes ==
The picture was dedicated to the "school teachers of America", and RKO developed a separate advertising strategy targeting this fact, completely separate from their usual marketing program.
