= Barbara Worth =

American actress (1906–1955)

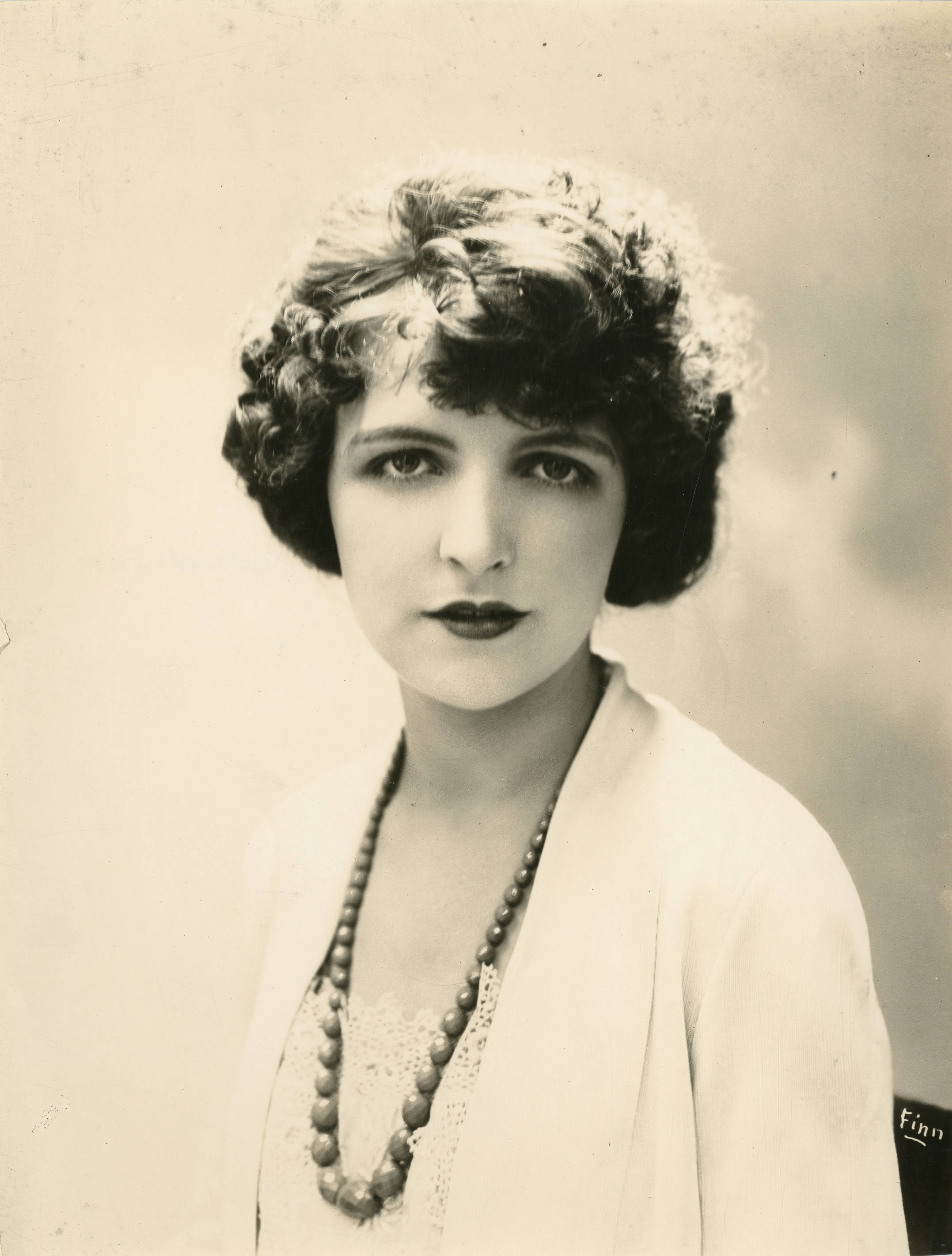
- Barbara Worth in 1922
- Born: January 6, 1906; Columbus, Ohio, U.S.
- Died: February 15, 1955 (aged 49); Santa Monica, California, U.S.
- Other name: Verna Louise Dooley
- Occupations: Actress, Writer
- Years active: 1923 - 1949 (film)
- Spouse: Tamar Lane

Barbara Worth (born Verna Dooley; 1906–1955) was an American film actress and screenwriter.

== Early years ==
Barbara Worth was born Verna Dooley in Columbus, Ohio, the daughter of James H. Dooley, a Chesapeake and Ohio Railway commercial agent. She attended both Ohio State and a private school in Charleston, South Carolina.

== Career ==
Worth's entry into films came via a project of Universal Pictures Corporation. In 1925, she was one of 14 young women "comparatively unknown to the screen" who were selected for the Universal Stock Company, which trained them via "small parts and bits."

Her film career included 12 features.

== Personal life ==
In 1926, Worth married Tamar Lane, who was editor and publisher of Film Mercury.

== Filmography ==
=== Actress ===
- An Old Sweetheart of Mine (1923)
- Broken Hearts of Hollywood (1926)
- The Prairie King (1927)
- Fast and Furious (1927)
- On Your Toes (1927)
- The Fearless Rider (1928)
- Plunging Hoofs (1929)
- The Prince of Hearts (1929)
- The Bachelor's Club (1929)
- Fury of the Wild (1929)
- Below the Deadline (1929)
- Valley of Badmen (1931)
- Lightnin' Smith Returns (1931)
- Fighting Trooper (1934)
- Racing Luck (1935)
- Reckless (1935)
- Men of Action (1935)
- I Live My Life (1935)

=== Screenwriter ===
- Dragnet (1947)
- The Counterfeiters (1948)
- Zamba (1949)

== Bibliography ==
- Michael R. Pitts. Poverty Row Studios, 1929-1940: An Illustrated History of 55 Independent Film Companies, with a Filmography for Each. McFarland & Company, 2005.
