= Doris Merrick =

American actress and model (1919–2019)

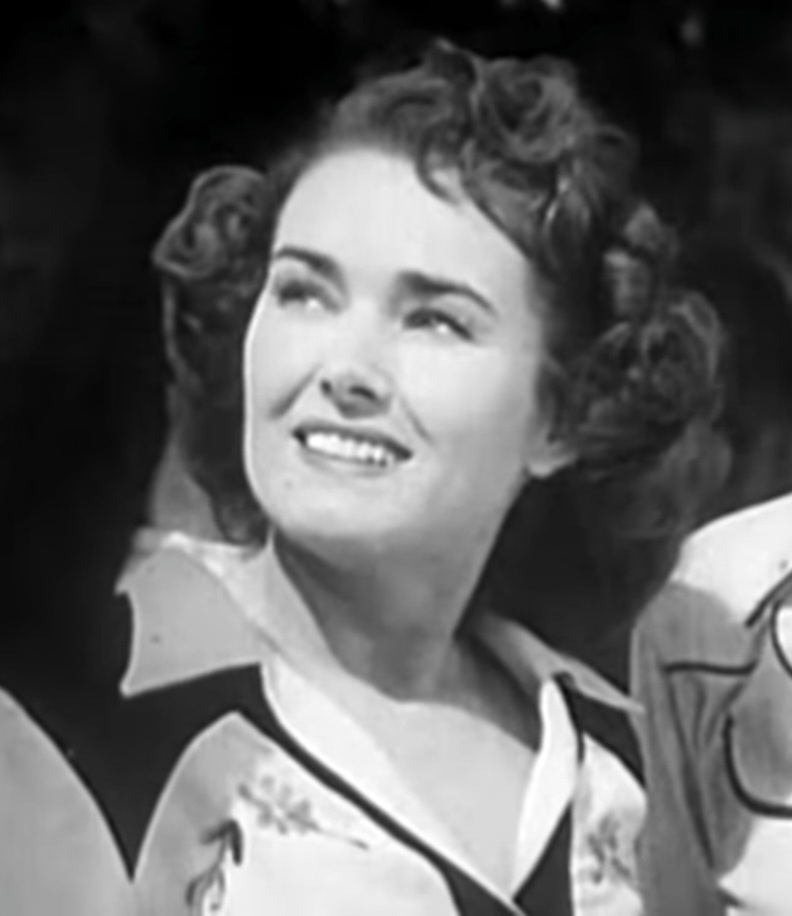
- Merrick in The Fighting Stallion (1950)
- Born: Doris Roberta Simpson; June 6, 1919
- Died: November 30, 2019 (aged 100); U.S.
- Other name: Doris Hatfield (married name)
- Occupations: Actress, model
- Years active: 1942–1955
- Spouses: Maximilian "Max" Marek (m. 1936; div. 1944) John Meagher Knoll (m. 1946; div. 1962) Matthew Lawton Hatfield (m. 1964; died 1986)
- Children: 5

Doris Roberta Merrick (née Simpson, June 6, 1919 – November 30, 2019) was an American film actress and model.

== Biography ==
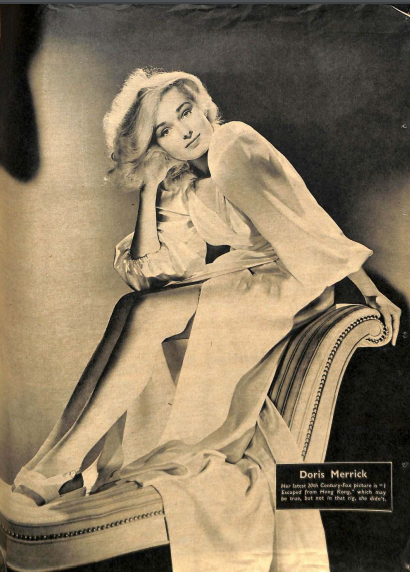
Pin-up photo of Merrick for Yank, the Army Weekly in 1943

Merrick was born Doris Simpson in June 1919, to Joseph Simpson and Nellie Weber, and had five brothers and four sisters. She attended Hyde Park High School and worked as a singer with her sisters, before becoming a soloist at NBC, she subsequently worked as a model before signing a contract with Warner Bros. in 1941. She was first given the name Beth Drake but changed to Doris Merrick not long after. After appearing in an uncredited role in Yankee Doodle Dandy, starring James Cagney, in 1941, she made her star film debut the following year in Girl Trouble. Her first notable role was in Time to Kill. While a couple of her roles went uncredited she had a notable supporting role in the Laurel and Hardy comedy The Big Noise (1944). She appeared in the magazine Yank, the Army Weekly during the WWII years and her professional acting career ended in 1955.

In June 1942 Merrick signed a long-term contract with 20th Century-Fox. Her first film with that studio was Girl Trouble.

== Personal life ==
Merrick was married to boxer Max Marek from 1936 to 1944, before being married to rancher and lumberman John Meagher Knoll from 1946 to 1962. Merrick lived in the Golden Valley Estates Assisted Living Centre in Yuma, Arizona and was going under her married name of Doris Hatfield. Merrick turned 100 in June 2019 and died in November.

== Filmography ==
- Yankee Doodle Dandy (1942) Uncredited
- Girl Trouble (1942) as Susan
- That Other Woman (1942) as Irene
- Time to Kill (1942) as Linda Conquest Murdock
- Heaven Can Wait (1943) as Nellie Brown (uncredited)
- Ladies of Washington (1944) as Susan
- In the Meantime, Darling (1944) as Mrs. MacAndrews
- The Big Noise (1944) as Evelyn
- Sensation Hunters (1945) as Julie Rogers
- This Love of Ours (1945) as Vivian
- Hit the Hay (1945) as Sally Mansfield
- Child of Divorce (1946) as Louise Norman
- The Pilgrim Lady (1947) as Millicent Rankin
- The Counterfeiters (1948) as Margo Talbot
- The Fighting Stallion (1950) as Jeanne Barton
- Untamed Women (1952) as Sandra
- The Neanderthal Man (1953) as Ruth Marshall
- Interrupted Melody (1955) as nurse (uncredited)
