= The Lone Hand (1922 film) =

1922 film

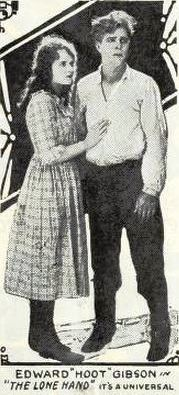
- Hoot Gibson and Marjorie Daw
- Directed by: B. Reeves Eason
- Written by: A. P. Younger
- Starring: Hoot Gibson
- Cinematography: Virgil Miller
- Distributed by: Universal Film Manufacturing Company
- Release date: October 16, 1922
- Running time: 50 minutes
- Country: United States
- Languages: Silent; English intertitles

The Lone Hand is a 1922 American silent Western film directed by B. Reeves Eason and featuring Hoot Gibson. It is not known whether the film currently survives, which suggests that it is a lost film.

== Plot ==
As described in a film magazine, hard punching Wyoming cowpuncher Laramie Lad decides to take a well-earned vacation and visit an old friend who runs a summer camp for city folks. On the way his horse drops in its tracks and Laramie is forced to proceed on foot. He runs into a shooting affair and learns that a young woman named Jane and her aged father Al Sheridan are in distress, victims of a swindler's ruse to defraud them of their mining property. Abandoning his vacation plans, the cowpuncher sets about foiling the plans of the crooks. Al is captured by the plotters who try to force from him the location of the secret entrance to the mine. Al escapes after several hours of torture and, thinking that the mine is his only haven of safety, he makes it to the bottom of the shaft before he lapses into unconsciousness. When the mine starts to flood Laramie, learning of the old man's plight, rescues him without a moment too loose. The crooks are brought to justice, Laramie puts the mine on a paying basis, and winds things up in a satisfactory manner when he wins Jane and his first vacation turns into a honeymoon.

== Cast ==
- Hoot Gibson as Laramie Lad (credited as Ed "Hoot" Gibson)
- Marjorie Daw as Jane Sheridan
- Helen Holmes as Margie Vanney
- Hayden Stevenson as Buck
- Jack Pratt as Jack Maltrain
- William Welsh as Al Sheridan (credited as William Welch)
- Bob Kortman as Curley (credited as Robert Kortman)
- Esther Ralston

== See also ==
- Hoot Gibson filmography
