= Don Harvey (actor, born 1911) =

American actor (1911–1963)

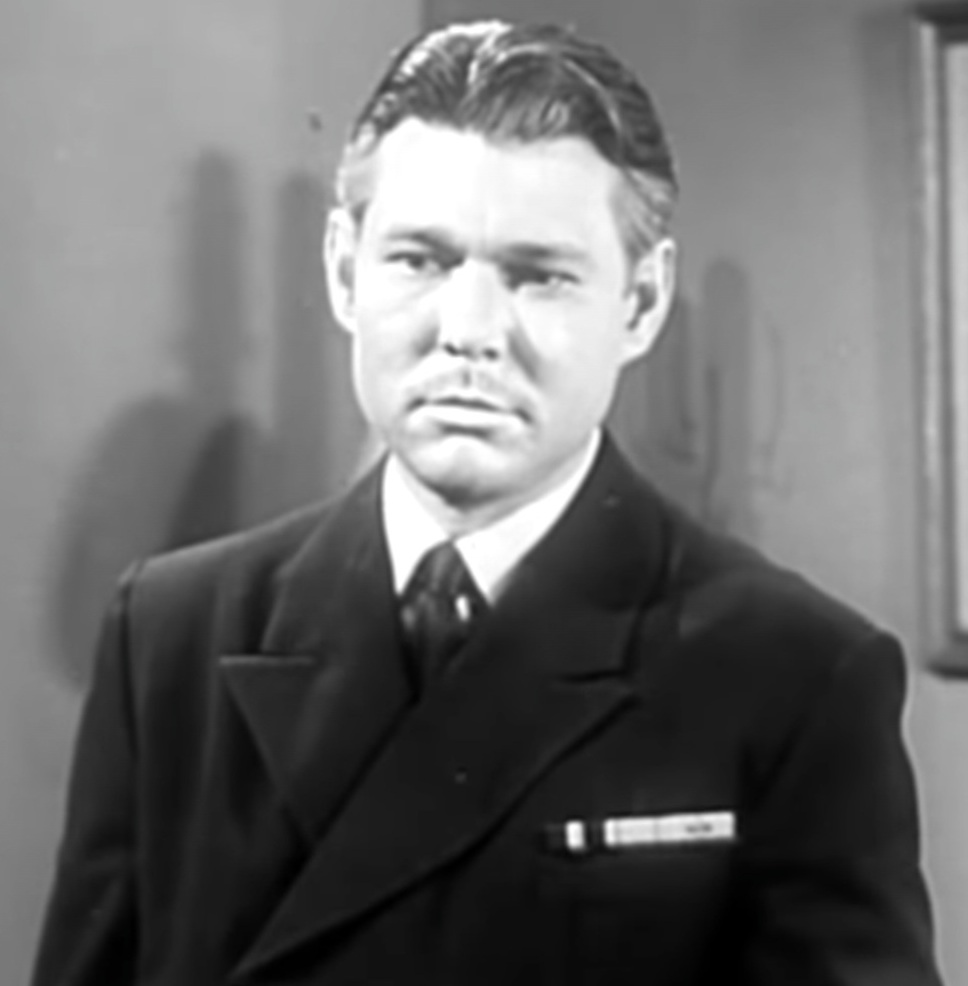
- Harvey in The Fighting Stallion (1956)
- Born: Don Carlos Harvey; December 12, 1911; Council Grove, Kansas, U.S.
- Died: April 23, 1963 (aged 51); Studio City, California, U.S.
- Resting place: Hollywood Forever Cemetery
- Other names: Don Harvey
- Occupation: Actor
- Years active: 1945–1963
- Spouse: Jean Harvey (m. 1934)

Don Carlos Harvey (December 12, 1911 – April 23, 1963) was an American television and film actor.

== Life ==
Born in Council Grove in Morris County in east central Kansas, Harvey began his acting career by performing on radio and in tent shows and repertory companies with his wife, the former Eugenia (Jean) Bartness (1900–1966), who was eleven years his senior. In Hollywood, he co-starred on a radio program with Hedda Hopper. In 1949, he contracted with Columbia Pictures and played in the serials, The Adventures of Sir Galahad and Batman and Robin (both 1949), and Atom Man vs. Superman (1950).

Harvey appeared in 180 films and television programs between 1945 and 1963. During the late 1940s alone, he appeared in fifteen films and television programs. Harvey's second film and his first credited role were Dragnet (1947), starring Henry Wilcoxon and Robert Kent, and the exploitation film, She Shoulda Said No! (1949), respectively.

== Death ==
Harvey died in 1963 at the age of fifty-one of a heart attack in Studio City, California and is interred at Hollywood Forever Cemetery.

== Career ==
=== 1950s ===
- Film: During the 1950s, Harvey appeared in more than fifty films including Northwest Territory (1951), Human Desire (1954), Strategic Air Command (1955), The Far Country (1955), and The Gun That Won the West (1955).
- Television: The Cisco Kid (1950), Captain Video: Master of the Stratosphere (1951), The Range Rider (1951–1952), The Gene Autry Show (1951–1953), The Adventures of Kit Carson (1953–1954), Captain Midnight (1954–1955), Annie Oakley, (five episodes, 1954–1955),The Lone Ranger, (seven episodes, 1954–1957), The Millionaire (1955), The Life and Legend of Wyatt Earp (1955–1960), Sky King (1956, in "Rocket Story"), Frontier Doctor (1958), The Donna Reed Show (1959), Riverboat (1959), and Colt .45 as Sergeant Billings and as Sheriff Clinter (1959–1960).

Harvey was cast as the besieged Lieutenant Gillespie in the 1957 episode, "California's Paul Revere" of the anthology series, Death Valley Days, hosted by Stanley Andrews. In the story line. Alex Sharp as Juan Flaco, or John Brown, who conducts a four-day ride from Los Angeles to Stockton, and then San Francisco to obtain more troops sent by sea to relive Los Angeles.

=== 1960s ===
- Film: In 1963, Harvey procured a bit part in Stanley Kramer's massive $9 million, 12-star production, It's a Mad, Mad, Mad, Mad World which starred Sid Caesar, Ethel Merman, Spencer Tracy, Mickey Rooney, and Milton Berle among others. Harvey got the role of a police officer, but offscreen he was the first cast member to die after completion of the filming.
- Television: During the 1960s, Harvey appeared in the popular genre of American westerns: Sugarfoot (1960), The Tall Man (1961), Bonanza (1961), Wagon Train (1961), Rawhide (1961–1962), Laramie (1962), Maverick (1962), and The Virginian (1963 episode "Run Away Home"). He also appeared in the mystery/crime dramas of Perry Mason (1961), Surfside 6 (1962), Hawaiian Eye (1960–1962), Checkmate (1962), and Empire (1963). He was in an episode of McHale's Navy in its first season.

== Selected filmography ==
- For You I Die (1947) as Matt Gruber
- Trail of the Rustlers (1950)
- Northwest Territory (1951)
- Untamed Mistress (1965) as Kurran the Hunter
- Beginning of the End (1957) as Guard at Lab
- Gunmen from Laredo (1959) as Deputy Dave
- The Wild Westerners (1962) as Hanna

== Television ==
Year	Title	Role	Notes
1959–1962	Rawhide	Collins	S2:2 Episodes, S3:2 Episodes, S4:9 Episodes
1959	Rawhide	Joe Greevey	S1:E9, "Incident of the Town in Terror"
1961	Rawhide	Marshal	S3:E26, "Incident of the Painted Lady"
