= Hit the Hay =

1945 film

- Directed by: Del Lord
- Written by: Charles R. Marion; Richard Wells; Henry Hoople; Frederick Louis Fox
- Produced by: Ted Richmond
- Starring: Judy Canova; Ross Hunter; Doris Merrick
- Cinematography: James Van Trees
- Edited by: Viola Lawrence
- Music by: Marlin Skiles
- Production company: Columbia Pictures
- Distributed by: Columbia Pictures
- Release date: November 29, 1945
- Running time: 62 minutes
- Country: United States
- Language: English

Hit the Hay is a 1945 American musical comedy film directed by Del Lord and starring Judy Canova, Ross Hunter, Fortunio Bonanova and Doris Merrick. It was produced and distributed by Columbia Pictures.

== Plot ==
An opera manager hires a farm-girl as singer for his new production.

== Cast ==
- Judy Canova as Judy Stevens / Helen Rand
- Ross Hunter as Ted Barton
- Fortunio Bonanova as Mario Alvini
- Doris Merrick as Sally Mansfield
- Gloria Holden as Mimi Valdez
- Francis Pierlot as Roger Barton
- Grady Sutton as Wilbur Whittlesey
- Louis Mason as Frisby
- Paul Stanton as J. Bellingham Parks
- Clyde Fillmore as Mayor Blackburn
- Maurice Cass as Prompter

== Production and release ==
Filming took place from August 2 until August 29, 1945. The working title for the film was Hayfoot, Strawfoot. The film was theatrically released on November 19, 1945.
