= Racing Luck (1935 film) =

1935 film by Sam Newfield

- Directed by: Sam Newfield
- Screenplay by: Joseph O'Donnell; George Wallace Sayre
- Story by: Joseph O'Donnell; George Wallace Sayre
- Produced by: George A. Hirliman
- Starring: William Boyd; Barbara Worth; George Ernest; Esther Muir; Ernest Hilliard; Onest Conley
- Cinematography: Edgar Lyons
- Edited by: Charles J. Hunt
- Production company: Republic Pictures
- Distributed by: Republic Pictures
- Release date: November 19, 1935
- Running time: 56 minutes
- Country: United States
- Language: English

Racing Luck is a 1935 American action film directed by Sam Newfield and written by Joseph O'Donnell and George Wallace Sayre. The film stars William Boyd, Barbara Worth, George Ernest, Esther Muir, Ernest Hilliard and Onest Conley. The film was released on November 19, 1935, by Republic Pictures.

== Plot ==
After the horse Life Belt is disqualified for a drug violation, trainer Dan Morgan is suspended from horse racing. He goes to work in a lesser role for June and Jimmy Curtis at their stables and tends to Color Sergeant, an injured horse.

A rival stable owner, Walker Hammond, is willing to go to any lengths to win. His men set fire to the Curtis stables, and when his horse Carnation scores a narrow victory over Color Sergeant in a big race, Morgan proves that Carnation is actually another horse, entered illegally. Hammond is now the one banned from the track.

== Cast ==
- William Boyd as Dan Morgan
- Barbara Worth as June Curtis
- George Ernest as Jimmy Curtis
- Esther Muir as Elaine Bostwick
- Ernest Hilliard as Walker Hammond
- Onest Conley as Mose
- Ben Hall as 'Knapsack'
- Henry Roquemore as Tuttle
- Dick Curtis as 'Dynamite'
- Ted Caskey as Fred Millan
- Joseph W. Girard as Commissioner
- Robert McKenzie as Rancher

== See also ==
- List of films about horses
- List of films about horse racing
