= Girl Trouble (1942 film) =

1942 film by Harold D. Schuster

- Directed by: Harold D. Schuster
- Written by: Screenplay: Robert Riley Crutcher; Ladislas Fodor; Story: Vicki Baum; Ladislas Fodor; Guy Trosper
- Produced by: Robert Bassler
- Starring: Don Ameche; Joan Bennett
- Cinematography: Edward Cronjager
- Edited by: Robert Fritch
- Music by: Alfred Newman
- Distributed by: 20th Century Fox
- Release date: 9 October 1942
- Running time: 81 minutes
- Country: United States
- Language: English

Girl Trouble (also known as Between You and Me and Man from Brazil) is a 1942 American comedy film directed by Harold D. Schuster and starring Don Ameche and Joan Bennett. It was made by 20th Century Fox.

== Plot ==
June Delaney belongs to the upper circles of New York City's social life. When she learns that her private money has been impounded by the British government, since most of her investments are made by her father in England before the outbreak of World War II, she is very annoyed. To make the most of what she got and continue living as before she is forced to rent out her upscale apartment. She advertises in a newspaper, and gets a response from a prospective tenant, a Venezuelan playboy and sole heir to an American rubber industry, Pedro Sullivan.

Pedro is going to the United States to secure a bank loan for his father's business, and needs a place to stay during the negotiations. Despite the huge cost of renting the fancy apartment, he cannot resist its beauty and the charms of its owner June.

When Pedro arrives to his new temporary home, June is dressed in an apron, and Pedro mistakes her for a servant. June does not take him out of his misconception, but continues to play along, telling him that Miss Delaney is away traveling. Since June knows nothing of the servant role, Pedro is soon very disappointed with her services. Pedro also meets resistance in the negotiations with the largest tire manufacturer in the United States, Ambrose Murdock Flint, who insists on investing his money in a rubber substitute instead of the real rubber Pedro has to offer. When Pedro talks to the company's New York representative, Mr. Cordoba, the latter misunderstands him and thinks he has been granted the loan by Flint.

June and Pedro go to the same club that night, and June tries to evade Pedro when she discovers him. Her real name is disclosed to Pedro though by an employee, and since June is oblivious of this, she lets Pedro take her to another club, where they start to fall in love with each other.

Mr. Cordoba learns that Pedro never got the loan and chastises him relentlessly. Pedro is ordered back to Venezuela. By one of June's jealous friends, he is led to believe that it was June that told Cordoba about the loan, to sabotage the deal. June on the other hand, is trying to use her charms to convince Flint investing in property she can offer him, to help Pedro get the money. A misunderstanding occurs as Pedro believes June is competing with him for Flint's money. June and Pedro become enemies, but make up at one of June's friends charity events. At the event, June manages to make Pedro and Flint meet again, and with June's help they finally reach an agreement and Pedro gets the loan. June and Pedro become a romantic couple, but Pedro accidentally manages to flatten Flint's car tire with a gun.

== Cast ==
- Don Ameche as Don Pedro Sullivan
- Joan Bennett as June Delaney
- Billie Burke as Mrs. Rowland
- Frank Craven as Ambrose Murdock Flint
- Alan Dinehart as Charles Barrett
- Helene Reynolds as Helen Martin
- Fortunio Bonanova as Simon Cordoba
- Ted North as George
- Doris Merrick as Susan
- Dale Evans as Ruth
- Roseanne Murray as Pauline
- Janis Carter as Virginia
- Vivian Blaine as Barbara
- Trudy Marshall as Miss Kennedy
- Robert Greig as Fields
- Joseph Crehan as Kohn
- Mantan Moreland as Edwards
- Arthur Loft as Burgess
- John Kelly as Mug
- Matt McHugh as Driver
- George Lessey as Morgan
- Edith Evanson as Huida
- Eddie Acuff as taxi driver
- Lee Bennett as Tom
- Ruth Cherrington as large woman
- Frank Coghlan, Jr. as elevator boy
- Jeff Corey as Mr. Mooney
- Mary Currier as Secretary
- Arno Frey as Anton
- Marjorie Kane as cashier
- Lois Landon as Mrs. Lawson
- Forbes Murray as Mr. Lawson
- Henry Roquemore as man
- Edwin Stanley as Lehman
- Jack Stoney as Mac
- Bruce Warren as Jerry
- Doodles Weaver as ticket taker
