= Lightnin' Smith Returns =

1931 film

- Directed by: Jack Irwin
- Written by: Jack Irwin
- Produced by: Jack Irwin
- Starring: Buddy Roosevelt; Barbara Worth; Tom London
- Cinematography: Amos Stillman
- Edited by: Earl Turner
- Production company: Standard Pictures
- Distributed by: Syndicate Pictures
- Release date: August 31, 1931
- Running time: 59 minutes
- Country: United States
- Language: English

Lightnin' Smith Returns is a 1931 American Western film directed by Jack Irwin and starring Buddy Roosevelt, Barbara Worth and Tom London.

== Plot ==
John Smith writes Western fiction without ever having visited the West. Helen Parker, a reader of his work, seeks to alleviate that situation by inviting him to visit her ranch for a real Western experience. Parker arranges for a fake holdup, with her impersonating outlaw Lightnin' Smith. Her plan goes awry when the real outlaw appears, giving the writer an opportunity to save Parker and her father. A 1934 film, Mystery Ranch, bore "a striking resemblance" to this one.

== Cast ==
- Buddy Roosevelt as John Smith
- Barbara Worth as Helen Parker
- Tom London as Lightning' Smith
- Nick Dunray as Mexican Pete
- Jack Richardson as Chancey Ruggles
- Sam Tittley as Tom Parker
- Fred Parker as Storekeeper
- William Bertram as Sheriff
- Gilbert Holmes as Bandit
- Slim Whitaker as Hideout Henchman

== Bibliography ==
- Michael R. Pitts. Poverty Row Studios, 1929–1940: An Illustrated History of 55 Independent Film Companies, with a Filmography for Each. McFarland & Company, 2005.
