= Fury of the Wild =

- Advertisement for the film
- Directed by: Leon d'Usseau
- Written by: Frank Howard Clark
- Starring: Ranger; Barbara Worth; Robert Homans
- Cinematography: Robert de Grasse
- Edited by: Della M. King
- Production company: Film Booking Offices of America
- Distributed by: RKO Pictures
- Release date: January 6, 1929
- Running time: 5 reels
- Country: United States
- Language: Silent (English intertitles)

Fury of the Wild is a 1929 silent melodrama film directed by Leon d'Usseau. It was produced by Film Booking Offices of America.

== Cast ==
- Ranger as a dog
- Barbara Worth as Molly Roark
- Robert Homans as Matt Roark
- Pat O'Brien as Jim Thayer
- Albert J. Smith as Red Hawkins

== Reception ==
A contemporary review in Film Daily referred to the film as "an average dog opus" with an "interesting story". A contemporary review in the Welland Tribune praised the films melodramatic actions.
