= The Fighting Stallion =

1950 film by Robert Emmett Tansey

- Directed by: Robert Emmett Tansey
- Written by: George F. Slavin (original story); Frances Kavanaugh (screenplay)
- Produced by: Jack Schwarz (producer); Robert Emmett Tansey (associate producer)
- Starring: See below
- Cinematography: Clark Ramsey
- Edited by: Reg Browne
- Music by: Edward Paul; Clarence Wheeler
- Distributed by: Eagle-Lion
- Release date: 23 March 1950
- Running time: 63 minutes
- Country: United States
- Language: English

The Fighting Stallion is a 1950 American Western film directed by Robert Emmett Tansey.

== Cast ==
- Bill Edwards as Lon Evans
- Doris Merrick as Jeanne Barton
- Forrest Taylor as Martin Evans
- Don C. Harvey as Commander Patrick
- Robert Carson as Tom Adams
- Concha Ybarra as Nantee
- Gene Alsace as Lem
- Merrill McCormick as Yancy
- Johnny Carpenter as Chuck
- Maria Hart as Dude

== See also ==
- List of films about horses
