= Maurice Conn =

American film producer

- Born: September 16, 1906; Concord, New Hampshire, United States
- Died: October 16, 1973 (aged 67); Los Angeles, California, United States
- Occupation: Film producer
- Years active: 1934–1949

Maurice H. Conn (1906–1973) was an American film producer, his first credit being The Fighting Trooper in 1934. Over the next 15 years he would produce 45 films.

== Filmography ==
(Per AFI database)

- The Fighting Trooper (1934)
- Wilderness Mail (1935)
- Northern Frontier (1935)
- Valley of Wanted Men (1935)
- Men of Action (1935)
- Trails of the Wild (1935)
- Red Blood of Courage (1935)
- His Fighting Blood (1935)
- The Code of the Mounted (1935
- Timber War (1935)
- Black Gold (1936)
- Phantom Patrol (1936)
- Galloping Dynamite (1936)
- Racing Blood (1936)
- Song of the Trail (1936)
- Headline Crasher (1936)
- Wildcat Trooper (1936)
- Robin Hood Jr. (1936)
- Born to Fight (1936)
- With Love and Kisses (1936)
- Wild Horse Round-Up (1936)
- Anything for a Thrill (1937)
- Roaring Six Guns (1937)
- Thanks for Listening (1937)
- Sing While You're Able (1937)
- Whistling Bullets (1937)
- Valley of Terror (1937)
- Young Dynamite (1937)
- The Devil Diamond (1937)
- The Fighting Texan (1937)
- Tough to Handle (1937)
- Code of the Rangers (1938)
- Frontier Scout (1938) (Associate producer)
- Gunsmoke Trail (1938)
- The Land of Fighting Men (1938)
- Phantom Ranger (1938)
- West of Rainbow's End (1938)
- Rough Riding Rhythm (1938)
- Where the West Begins (1938)
- Two Gun Justice (1938)
- Dragnet (1947)
- The Counterfeiters (1948)
- Zamba (1949)
