= Rebel City =

1953 film by Thomas Carr

- Directed by: Thomas Carr
- Written by: Sidney Theil
- Produced by: Vincent M. Fennelly
- Starring: Wild Bill Elliott; Marjorie Lord; Robert Kent
- Cinematography: Ernest Miller
- Edited by: Sam Fields
- Music by: Raoul Kraushaar
- Production company: Silvermine Productions
- Distributed by: Allied Artists
- Release date: May 10, 1953
- Running time: 52 minutes
- Country: United States
- Language: English

Rebel City is a 1953 American Western film directed by Thomas Carr and starring Wild Bill Elliott, Marjorie Lord and Robert Kent. The film is set in Junction City in Kansas during the American Civil War where Southern supporters are attempting to launch an uprising.

== Cast ==
- Wild Bill Elliott as Frank Graham
- Marjorie Lord as Jane Dudley
- Robert Kent as Captain Ramsey
- Keith Richards as Temple
- I. Stanford Jolley as Perry
- Denver Pyle as Greeley
- Henry Rowland as Hardy
- John Crawford as Joe Spencer
- Otto Waldis as Spain - the Jeweler
- Stanley Price as Herb
- Ray Walker as Colonel Barnes
- Michael Vallon as Sam - the Barber
- Bill Walker as William

== Bibliography ==
- Britton, Wesley Alan. Onscreen and Undercover: The Ultimate Book of Movie Espionage. Greenwood Publishing Group, 2006.
- Martin, Len D. The Allied Artists Checklist: The Feature Films and Short Subjects of Allied Artists Pictures Corporation, 1947-1978. McFarland & Company, 1993.
