= Madame Sul-Te-Wan =

American actress (1873–1959)

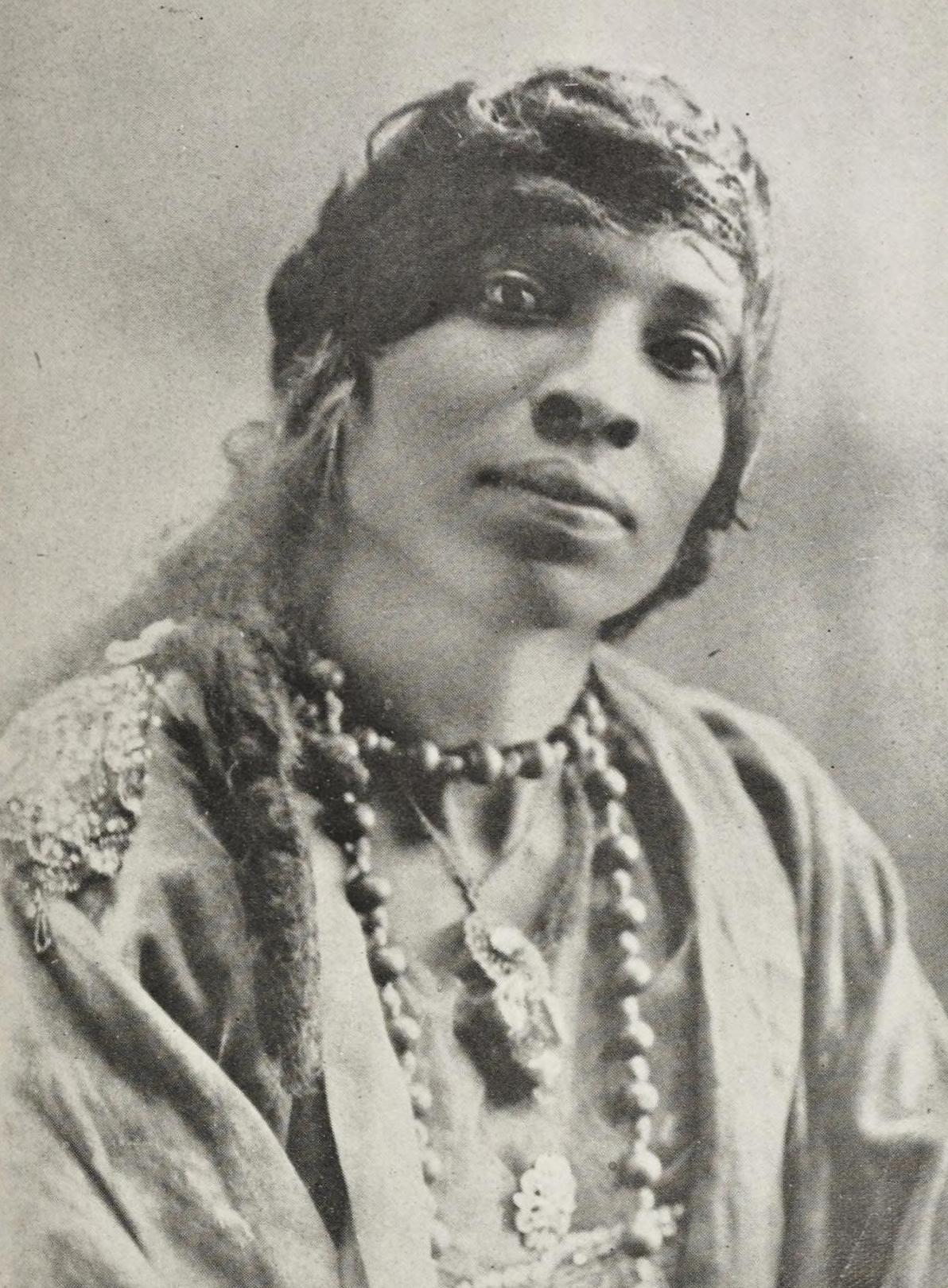
- Madame Sul-Te-Wan in 1919
- Born: Nellie Crawford; March 7, 1873; Louisville, Kentucky, U.S.
- Died: February 1, 1959 (aged 85); Woodland Hills, Los Angeles, U.S.
- Resting place: Valhalla Memorial Park Cemetery
- Other names: Sul-Te-Wan; Madame Sultewan; Madame Wan
- Occupation: Actress
- Years active: 1915–1958
- Spouses: Robert Reed Conley (m. 1906, divorced) Anton Ebentheuer (m. 1950; div. 1953)
- Children: 3, Odel Conley, Onest Conley, Otto Conley

Madame Sul-Te-Wan (born Nellie Crawford; March 7, 1873 – February 1, 1959) was an American actress.

She was the first African-American actress to sign a film contract and be a featured performer. She was an American stage, film and television actress for more than 50 years. The daughter of former slaves, she began her career in entertainment touring the East Coast with various theatrical companies and moved to California to become a member of the fledgling film community. She became known as a character actress, appeared in high-profile films such as The Birth of a Nation (1915) and Intolerance (1916), and easily navigated the transition to the sound films.

In 1986, she was inducted into the Black Filmmakers Hall of Fame.

== Early life ==
Nellie Crawford was born in Louisville, Kentucky, to former slaves Cleon De Londa and Silas Crawford. Her father left the family early in her life, and her mother became a laundress for Louisville stage actresses. Young Nellie became enchanted by watching the young actresses rehearse when she delivered laundry for her mother. When she was older she moved to Cincinnati, Ohio, joined a theatrical company called Three Black Cloaks, and began billing herself as "Creole Nell". She also formed her own theatrical companies and toured the East Coast. After moving to California, Crawford began her film career in uncredited roles in director D. W. Griffith's controversial 1915 drama Birth of a Nation. Crawford had allegedly written Griffith a letter of introduction after hearing that Griffith was shooting a film in her Kentucky hometown. Griffith had intended that he would play a rich landowner who spits in the face of a woman who slights him. The scene was cut by the censors but Crawford was hired at $3 a day and this became the first contract for a black woman when she was hired at $25 a week. Sul-Te-Wan had managed to get the role by her extravagant dress which caught Griffith's attention.

In the early 1900s, Crawford married Robert Reed Conley. They had three sons, but Conley abandoned his family when the third boy was only three weeks old. Two of her sons, Odel Conley and Onest Conley, became actors and appeared in several films. Some of these films featured their mother.

When Crawford began using the stage name "Madame Sul-Te-Wan" is unknown; its first appearance on a cast list is in 1931, as the character of Voodoo Sue in Heaven on Earth. The origin of the name is also unknown; historian Donald Bogle observed that it suggests a mixed race ancestry, which allowed her to play East Asian, American Indian, Spanish, African and Negro character roles. Bolstering this, Jet claimed in 1959 that her father had been "a Hindu manservant", while the 2003 Encyclopedia of the Harlem Renaissance noted allegations that her father had been Native Hawaiian.

== Early film career ==
Following her roles for Griffith, "Madame Sul-Te-Wan" followed up in 1916 with an uncredited role in the Anita Loos-penned drama The Children Pay with Lillian Gish and, again uncredited, in 1917 with Gish's sister Dorothy in the Edward Morrissey-directed drama Stage Struck.

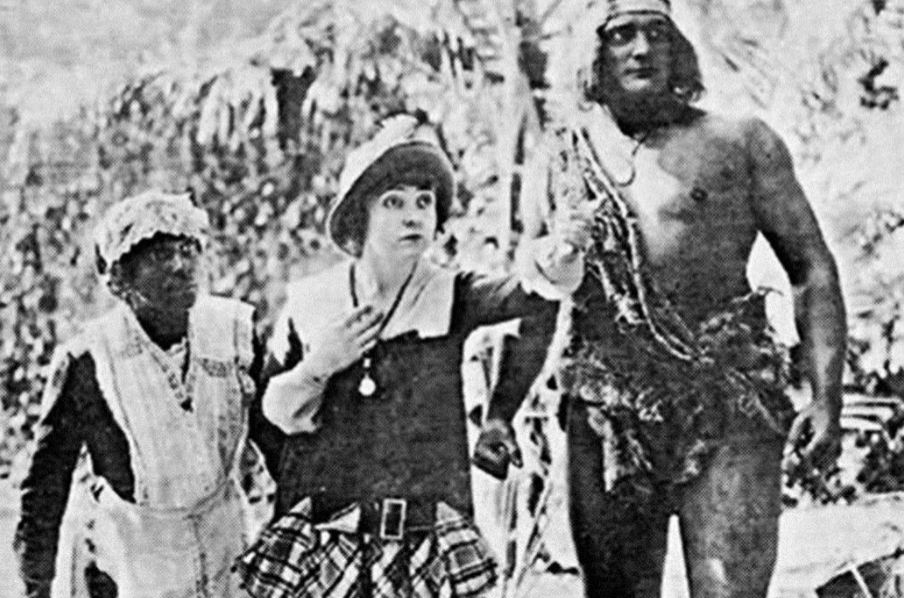
Sul-Te-Wan appeared (uncredited) in Tarzan of the Apes in 1918

Throughout the 1910s and 1920s, Sul-Te-Wan would establish herself as a publicly recognizable character actress. In 1918 she appeared (uncredited) in Tarzan of the Apes as Jane's maid, Esmerelda. She appeared uncredited, most often in "Mammy" roles, alongside such popular actors of the silent film era as Tom Mix, Leatrice Joy, Matt Moore, Mildred Harris, Harry Carey, Robert Harron, and Mae Marsh. She appeared uncredited in the 1927 James W. Horne-directed Buster Keaton comedy College, and, uncredited, in the 1929 Erich von Stroheim-directed drama Queen Kelly, starring Gloria Swanson.

Sul-Te-Wan transitioned into the talkie era with relative ease and continued to appear uncredited in high-profile films alongside such prominent film actors as Conrad Nagel, Barbara Stanwyck, Fay Wray, Richard Barthelmess, Jane Wyman, Luise Rainer, Melvyn Douglas, Lucille Ball, Veronica Lake and Claudette Colbert. However, as a black woman in the era of segregation, she was consistently limited to appearing in roles as minor characters who were usually convicts, "native women", or domestic servants, such as her uncredited role as a "Native Handmaiden" in the 1933 box-office hit King Kong. Despite the motion picture industry's limitations for African-American performers, Sul-Te-Wan worked consistently throughout the 1930s and 1940s.

In 1937, Sul-Te-Wan was cast in the role of Tituba for the film Maid of Salem, a dramatic retelling of the Salem Witch Trials of 1692. Sul-Te-Wan's performance garnered critical praise.

== Later career ==
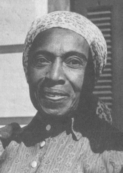
Sul-Te-Wan c. 1950

On September 12, 1953, a banquet was held at the Hollywood Playground Auditorium by motion picture actors and film personalities to honor Sul-Te-Wan. Among its 200 attendees were Louise Beavers, Rex Ingram, Mae Marsh, Eugene Pallette and Maude Eburne.

In 1954 Sul-Te-Wan appeared uncredited in the Otto Preminger directed African-American themed musical drama Carmen Jones opposite Dorothy Dandridge, Harry Belafonte, Diahann Carroll, and Pearl Bailey as Dandridge's grandmother. The film marked a rare departure for Sul-Te-Wan from four decades of predominantly "Mammy" roles. Her pairing with Dandridge led some to believe that Sul-Te-Wan was Dandridge's actual grandmother; the two women were actually unrelated.

At age 77, Sul-Te-Wan married for the second time, to German immigrant Anton Ebentheuer. The marriage lasted three years. During the 1950s, while in her 80s, she continued to appear onscreen in a number of well-received films, albeit now mostly in smaller bit parts and often uncredited. Her last screen appearance came in the 1958 Anthony Quinn-directed adventure film The Buccaneer, starring Yul Brynner and Charlton Heston.

== Death ==
On February 1, 1959, Madame Sul-Te-Wan died after suffering a stroke at the age of 85 at the Motion Picture Actors' Home in Woodland Hills, California. She was interred at the Pierce Brothers' Valhalla Memorial Park Cemetery in North Hollywood, Los Angeles County, California.

== Legacy and honors ==
Sul-Te-Wan was inducted in the Black Filmmakers Hall of Fame in 1986.

== Quotes ==
- "We never did discover the origin of her name. No one was bold enough to ask." – Lillian Gish.

== Filmography ==
| Year | Title | Role | Notes |
|---|---|---|---|
| 1915 | The Cause of It All | Mary – the Hotel Cook | |
| 1915 | The Birth of a Nation | Black woman (Dr. Cameron's taunter) | Uncredited |
| 1916 | Hoodoo Ann | Black Cindy | Uncredited |
| 1916 | Intolerance | Girl at Marriage Market (Babylonian Story) | Uncredited |
| 1916 | The Children Pay | | Uncredited |
| 1917 | Stage Struck | | Uncredited; also known as Stagestruck |
| 1918 | Old Wives for New | Viola's Maid | Uncredited |
| 1918 | Tarzan of the Apes | Esmeralda (Jane's Maid) | Uncredited |
| 1918 | Who's Your Father? | Black Mother | Uncredited |
| 1920 | Why Change Your Wife? | Sally's Maid | Uncredited |
| 1922 | Manslaughter | Prison Inmate | Uncredited |
| 1924 | The Lightning Rider | Mammy | |
| 1925 | The Narrow Street | Easter | |
| 1925 | The Golden Bed | Boarding House Maid | Uncredited |
| 1927 | College | Cook | Uncredited |
| 1927 | Uncle Tom's Cabin | Slave at Wedding | Uncredited |
| 1929 | Queen Kelly | Kali Sana – Aunt's Cook | Uncredited |
| 1929 | The Carnation Kid | The Maid | Uncredited |
| 1930 | Sarah and Son | Ashmore's Maid | Uncredited |
| 1930 | The Thoroughbred | Sacharine | Alternative title: Riding to Win |
| 1931 | The Pagan Lady | Carla the Servant | Uncredited |
| 1931 | Heaven on Earth | Voodoo Sue | Alternative title: Mississippi |
| 1932 | Jungle Mystery | Native Woman in Stockade | Uncredited |
| 1933 | Ladies They Talk About | Prisoner Mustard | Uncredited; Alternative title: Women in Prison |
| 1933 | King Kong | Native Handmaiden | Uncredited |
| 1934 | A Modern Hero | Mme. Azais' Neighbor | Uncredited |
| 1934 | Operator 13 | Slave at Medicine Show | Uncredited |
| 1934 | Black Moon | Ruva | |
| 1934 | Imitation of Life | Black Cook | Uncredited |
| 1935 | So Red the Rose | Slave | Uncredited |
| 1936 | San Francisco | Earthquake Survivor | Uncredited |
| 1937 | Maid of Salem | Tituba | |
| 1937 | In Old Chicago | Hattie | Credited as Madame Sultewan |
| 1938 | Island in the Sky | Scrubwoman | Uncredited |
| 1938 | The Toy Wife | Eve, a Black Servant | Uncredited; Alternative title: Frou Frou |
| 1938 | The Affairs of Annabel | Benzedrina, a Convict | Uncredited |
| 1938 | Kentucky | Lily | |
| 1939 | Tell No Tales | Jim Alley's mother | Uncredited; Alternative title: A Hundred to One |
| 1939 | Torchy Blane... Playing with Dynamite | Ruby – Black Convict Woman | Uncredited |
| 1940 | Safari | Native Woman | |
| 1940 | Maryland | Naomi | Uncredited |
| 1940 | Love Thy Neighbor | Lady McBeth | Uncredited |
| 1941 | King of the Zombies | Tahama, the Cook and High Priestess | |
| 1941 | Sullivan's Travels | Church harmonium player | Uncredited |
| 1942 | Mokey | Miss Cully, old black woman | Uncredited |
| 1943 | Revenge of the Zombies | Mammy Beulah, the housekeeper | Alternative title: The Corpse Vanished |
| 1943 | Thank Your Lucky Stars | Bit in "Ice Cold Katie" Number | Uncredited |
| 1949 | Mighty Joe Young | Young family servant | Uncredited; Alternative title: Mr. Joseph Young of Africa |
| 1949 | The Story of Seabiscuit | Libby | Uncredited |
| 1954 | Carmen Jones | Hagar – Carmen's Grandmother | Uncredited |
| 1955 | Medic | Grandma Jorson | Episode: "All My Mothers, All My Fathers" |
| 1957 | Something of Value | Midwife | Uncredited; Alternative title: Africa Ablaze |
| 1957 | Band of Angels | Flower Vendor | Uncredited |
| 1958 | The Buccaneer | Good Luck Charm Vendor | |
| 1958 | Tarzan and the Trappers | Witch Woman | (final film role) |
