= Men of Action =

1935 film directed by Alan James

- Directed by: Alan James
- Written by: Forrest Sheldon; John W. Krafft; Barry Barringer
- Based on: "The New Freedom" by Peter B. Kyne
- Produced by: Maurice Conn
- Starring: Frankie Darro; Roy Mason; Barbara Worth
- Cinematography: Arthur Reed
- Edited by: Charles Harris
- Production company: Conn Pictures
- Release date: July 1935 (US)
- Running time: 61 minutes
- Country: United States
- Language: English

Men of Action is a 1935 American drama film directed by Alan James from a screenplay by Forrest Sheldon, John W. Krafft, and Barry Barringer based on Peter B. Kyne's story, "The New Freedom." The film stars Frankie Darro, Roy Mason, and Barbara Worth.

== Cast ==
- Frankie Darro as The engineer's friend
- Roy Mason as The construction engineer
- Barbara Worth
- Edwin Maxwell as The banker
- Fred Kohler as The foreman
- Arthur Hoyt
- John Ince
- Eddie Phillips
- Roger Williams
- Joseph Girard
