= The Bachelor's Club (1929 film) =

1929 film

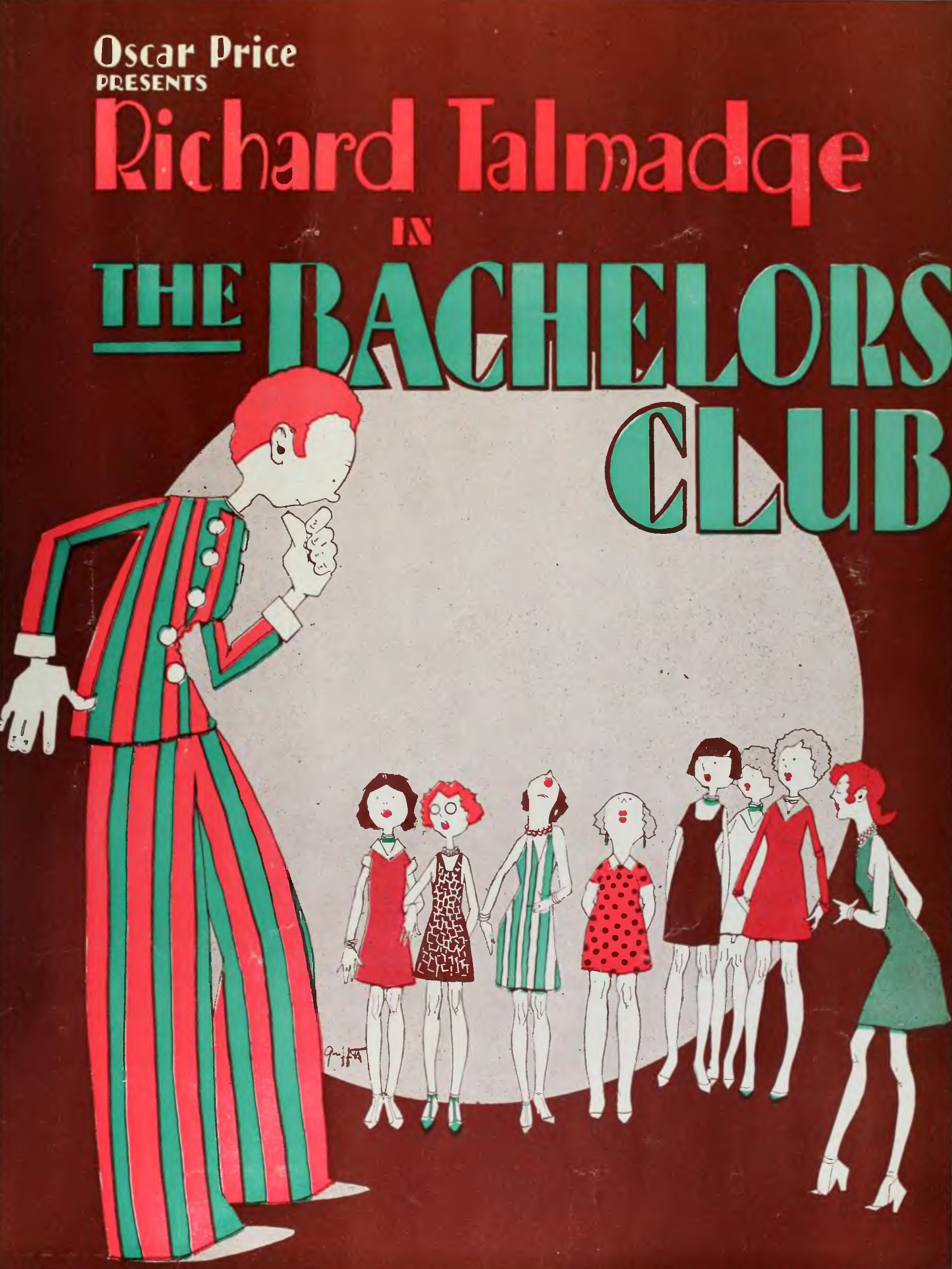
- Directed by: Noel M. Smith
- Written by: Al Martin; Betty Moore
- Produced by: Richard Talmadge
- Starring: Richard Talmadge; Barbara Worth; Edna Murphy
- Cinematography: Harry Cooper; William Wheeler
- Edited by: Martin Obzina
- Music by: Erno Rapee
- Production company: Oscar Price Productions
- Distributed by: Parthenon Pictures
- Release date: January 5, 1929
- Running time: 64 minutes
- Country: United States
- Language: English

The Bachelor's Club is a 1929 American independent comedy film directed by Noel M. Smith and starring Richard Talmadge, Barbara Worth and Edna Murphy.

== Cast ==
- Richard Talmadge as Dick Butler
- Barbara Worth as Dot Arnold
- Edna Murphy as Gussie
- Edna Ellsmere
- V. Talbot Henderson
- Herbert Heyes
- Barry Palmer
- Josef Swickard

== Bibliography ==
- Connelly, Robert B. The Silents: Silent Feature Films, 1910-36, Volume 40, Issue 2. December Press, 1998.
- Melnick, Ross. American Showman: Samuel "Roxy" Rothafel and the Birth of the Entertainment Industry, 1908-1935. Columbia University Press, 2014.
- Munden, Kenneth White. The American Film Institute Catalog of Motion Pictures Produced in the United States, Part 1. University of California Press, 1997.
