= Bob Carson =

American actor (1909–79)

Robert Carson
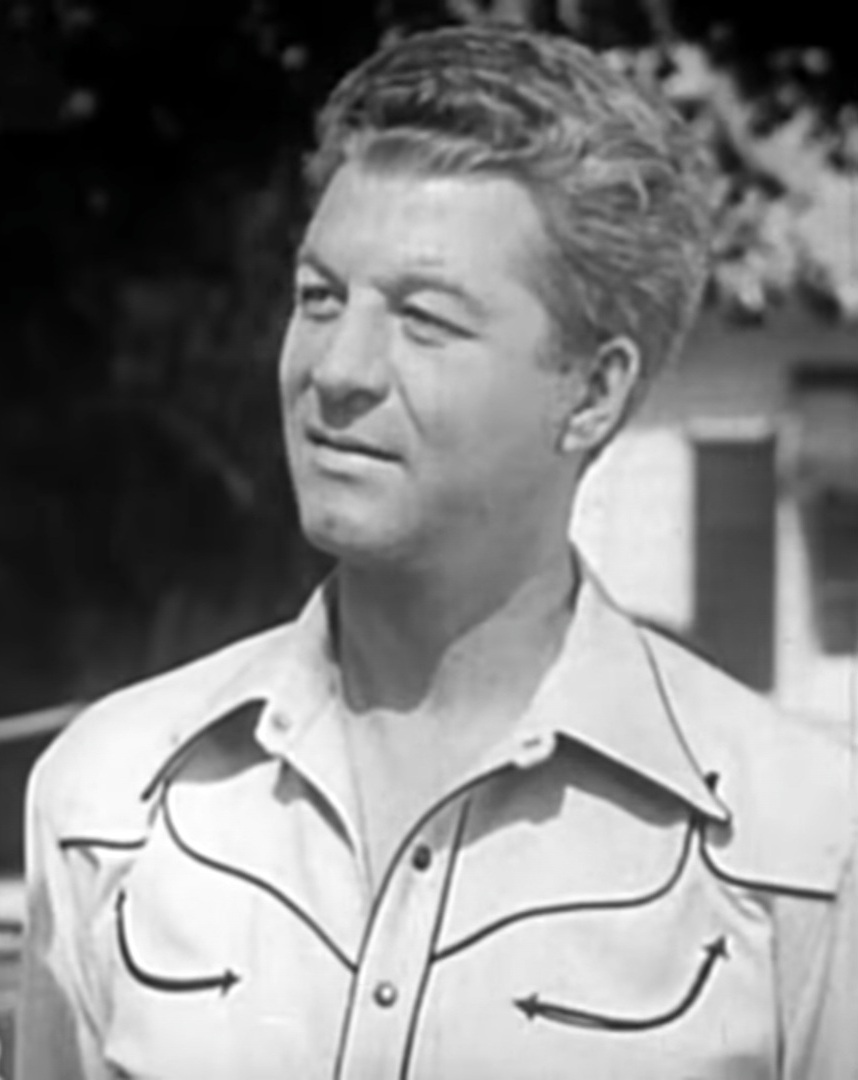
- Carson in The Fighting Stallion (1950)
- Born: Robert Samuel Carson; June 8, 1909; Hennepin County, Minnesota, U.S.
- Died: June 2, 1979 (aged 69); Atascadero, California, U.S.
- Resting place: Forest Lawn Memorial Park, Glendale, California
- Occupation: Actor
- Years active: 1939–1974

Robert Samuel Carson (June 8, 1909 – June 2, 1979) was an American actor noted for dozens of supporting roles in films and television series during a career that spanned three and a half decades. He was also occasionally billed as Bob Carson or Robert S. Carson.

== Early years ==
Carson was born in Hennepin County, Minnesota, to Elmer Llewellyn Carson and Elsa W. Carson (née Brunke) and grew up in Carman, Manitoba, Canada, along with his younger brother and actor Jack Carson. The family later moved to Milwaukee, Wisconsin. Robert was active as a singer and musician while he was a student at the University of Minnesota.

== Noted appearances ==
Carson portrayed the ringmaster in The Greatest Show on Earth (1952) with Charlton Heston.

Carson was cast in five episodes of the religion anthology series, Crossroads: as a police lieutenant in "The Unholy Trio" (1955) and in "The Two-Fisted Saint" and "False Prophet" (both 1956), as a coach in "The Comeback" (1956), and as Senator Crocker in "In God We Trust" (1957). Carson also co-starred in four episodes of Space Patrol (1950 TV series) as Governor Willis.

In 1957, he portrayed Kittredge the riverboat card dealer in the third segment of the ABC/Warner Brothers Western television series, Maverick, in the episode entitled "According to Hoyle" opposite James Garner and Diane Brewster, as well as playing various roles in the episodes "The Lonesome Reunion" (1958) with Garner, "The Thirty-ninth Star" (1958) with Jack Kelly, "The Rivals" (1959) with Garner and Roger Moore in a story based upon the 1775 play by Richard Brinsley Sheridan, "The Brasada Spur" (1959) with Kelly, and "Guatemala City" (1960) with Garner. Between 1957 and 1962 he appeared in five episodes of Perry Mason. Among his roles he played the prison warden in the 1960 episode, "The Case of the Wandering Widow," and Commodore Galen Holmes in the 1962 episode, "The Case of the Weary Watchdog."

His other television credits include a 1951 and 1955 episode of The Lone Ranger; The George Burns and Gracie Allen Show; Cheyenne; Green Acres; Make Room for Daddy; M Squad with Lee Marvin; Riverboat with Darren McGavin; Bourbon Street Beat with Andrew Duggan; 77 Sunset Strip; Bonanza; Bronco with Ty Hardin; The Deputy with Henry Fonda and Allen Case; Checkmate with Doug McClure and Sebastian Cabot; nine episodes of Alfred Hitchcock Presents and two of The Alfred Hitchcock Hour; The Andy Griffith Show; Thriller; Hawaiian Eye; Mister Ed; The Beverly Hillbillies with Buddy Ebsen; My Three Sons with Fred MacMurray; Petticoat Junction; Hawaii Five-O; Here's Lucy with Lucille Ball; and The High Chaparral, among many others.

== Civic involvement ==
For more than a decade, Carson was active as a speaker for the American Cancer Society. His efforts were prompted by the death of his first wife Anna Kutner Carson from uterine cancer and his brother's death from stomach cancer.

== Death ==
Carson died 6 days before his 70th birthday in Atascadero in San Luis Obispo County, California and is interred at Forest Lawn Memorial Park in Glendale, California.

== Selected filmography ==
- Dick Tracy's G-Men (1939, Serial) - Scott
- Five Little Peppers in Trouble (1940) - Jim, King's Chauffeur (uncredited)
- The Saint in Palm Springs (1941) - Mystery Man (uncredited)
- Jungle Man (1941) - Andy
- Call Out the Marines (1942) - Marine Lieutenant (uncredited)
- Wake Island (1942) - Marine Spotting Reconnaissance Plane (uncredited)
- Phantom Killer (1942) - Dave Rigby
- Lost City of the Jungle (1946, Serial) - Henchman with Walkie-Talkie [Chs. 2-3] (uncredited)
- My Dream Is Yours (1949) - Jeff (uncredited)
- White Heat (1949) - Agent at Directional Map (uncredited)
- Trapped (1949) - Bill Mason (uncredited)
- Radar Secret Service (1950) - Tom - Radar Operator
- Mule Train (1950) - Bill Cummings (uncredited)
- The Fighting Stallion (1950) - Tom Allen
- County Fair (1950) - Racetrack Steward (uncredited)
- Indian Territory (1950) - Captain Wallace (uncredited)
- The Man Who Cheated Himself (1950) - Highway Patrol Radio Dispatcher (uncredited)
- Two Lost Worlds (1951) - Captain Allison
- Operation Pacific (1951) - Torpedo Officer (uncredited)
- The Groom Wore Spurs (1951) - Hotel Desk Clerk (uncredited)
- Home Town Story (1951) - Reporter at Airport (uncredited)
- A Millionaire for Christy (1951) - Police Officer (uncredited)
- The Greatest Show on Earth (1952) - Ringmaster
- High Noon (1952) - Townsman (uncredited)
- For Men Only (1952) - Detective Jesse Hopkins
- Sailor Beware (1952) - Navy Captain (uncredited)
- Red Snow (1952) - Debriefing General
- Young Man with Ideas (1952) - Second Prosecutor (uncredited)
- Red Planet Mars (1952) - President's Aide (uncredited)
- Actor's and Sin (1952) - Thomas Hayne (segment "Actor's Blood")
- Park Row (1952) - Irate Liberty Fund Contributor (uncredited)
- The Bad and the Beautiful (1952) - Casting Director (uncredited)
- The Magnetic Monster (1953) - Airline Pilot (uncredited)
- Battle Circus (1953) - Division Surgeon (uncredited)
- The Stars Are Singing (1953) - Bit Role (uncredited)
- Count the Hours (1953) - Jury Foreman (uncredited)
- Code Two (1953) - Homicide Detective (uncredited)
- It Came from Outer Space (1953) - Dugan (uncredited)
- Murder Without Tears (1953) - Dan, the District Attorney
- So This Is Love (1953) - Policeman (uncredited)
- The Man from the Alamo (1953) - Jim, Texas Patriot at Meeting (uncredited)
- No Escape (1953) - Dr. Seymour
- Man of Conflict (1953) - Union Representative
- Jack Slade (1953) - Holdup Man (uncredited)
- Three Sailors and a Girl (1953) - Bank Client (uncredited)
- Executive Suite (1954) - Lee Ormand (uncredited)
- Pushover (1954) - First Bartender (uncredited)
- Her Twelve Men (1954) - Doctor (uncredited)
- Three Hours to Kill (1954) - Cowhand (uncredited)
- Deep in My Heart (1954) - Lodge Orchestra Leader (uncredited)
- Interrupted Melody (1955) - Base Commander (uncredited)
- The Eternal Sea (1955) - Commander (uncredited)
- Love Me or Leave Me (1955) - Brelston, Radio Station Manager (uncredited)
- The Road to Denver (1955) - Deputy Ben (uncredited)
- You're Never Too Young (1955) - Tailor (uncredited)
- The Price of Fear (1956) - George Willebrandt (uncredited)
- Mohawk (1956) - Settler (uncredited)
- Anything Goes (1956) - Backstage Party Guest (uncredited)
- The Ten Commandments (1956) - Eleazar as an Adult
- The Opposite Sex (1956) - Backstage Well-Wisher (uncredited)
- The Great American Pastime (1956) - Bruce's Law Partner (uncredited)
- Alfred Hitchcock Presents (1957) (Season 3 Episode 8: "Last Request") - Harry Judson
- Slander (1957) - Allen J. 'Frank' Frederick (uncredited)
- Top Secret Affair (1957) - Military Counsel (uncredited)
- Footsteps in the Night (1957) - Captain Jim Halford (uncredited)
- Sweet Smell of Success (1957) - Lou, Headwaiter at Toots Shor's (uncredited)
- Band of Angels (1957) - Bidder (uncredited)
- Alfred Hitchcock Presents (1958) (Season 4 Episode 9: "Murder Me Twice") - Mr. Carson
- Too Much, Too Soon (1958) - Associate (uncredited)
- Live Fast, Die Young (1958) - Frank Castellani
- The Fearmakers (1958) - Man Speaking in Conference Room (uncredited)
- The Buccaneer (1958) - Militia Major
- Alfred Hitchcock Presents (1959) (Season 4 Episode 25: "The Kind Waitress") - Grand Jury Foreman
- Alfred Hitchcock Presents (1959) (Season 4 Episode 35: "Touché") - Judge
- The Mating Game (1959) - Party Guest (uncredited)
- Girls Town (1959) - Mr. Gardner (uncredited)
- Leave It to Beaver (06/11/1959) “Beaver the Athlete” - Gym teacher
- Alfred Hitchcock Presents (1960) (Season 5 Episode 26: "Mother, May I Go Out to Swim") - Inquest Board Chairman
- Alfred Hitchcock Presents (1960) (Season 5 Episode 34: "Cell 227") - Warden Elvery
- Cimarron (1960) - Senator Rollins (uncredited)
- Alfred Hitchcock Presents (1961) (Season 6 Episode 17: "The Last Escape") - Police Chief Wallace
- Alfred Hitchcock Presents (1961) (Season 6 Episode 35: "Coming Home") - Warden
- Three Blondes in His Life (1961) - Henry Carr
- All in a Night's Work (1961) - Maitre d' (uncredited)
- Bachelor in Paradise (1961) - Attorney (uncredited)
- Alfred Hitchcock Presents (1962) (Season 7 Episode 15: "The Door Without a Key") - Lieutenant (uncredited)
- The Alfred Hitchcock Hour (1963) (Season 1 Episode 15: "The Thirty-First of February") - Coroner
- The Alfred Hitchcock Hour (1963) (Season 1 Episode 31: "Run for Doom") - Detective Mulloy
- Wives and Lovers (1963) - Sam (uncredited)
- Wall of Noise (1963) - Ian Malcolm (uncredited)
- Who's Minding the Store? (1963) - Mr. Salzbury, Phoebe's Secretary (uncredited)
- Kissin' Cousins (1964) - General Sam Kruger (uncredited)
- Advance to the Rear (1964) - Colonel Holbert (uncredited)
- The Patsy (1964) - Table Captain #2 at Italian Café (uncredited)
- Kisses for My President (1964) - Presidential Diplomatic Aide (uncredited)
- How to Murder Your Wife (1965) - Bachelor Party Guest (uncredited)
- The Great Race (1965) - Vice Chairman (uncredited)
- The Gnome-Mobile (1967) - Attendant at Five Oaks (uncredited)
- Which Way to the Front? (1970) - Captain Overman (uncredited)
- Get to Know Your Rabbit (1972) - Young Man (uncredited)
- Herbie Rides Again (1974) - Lawyer - First Team (final film role)
