= Martin Obzina =

American art director

- Born: November 20, 1892; Vienna, Austria
- Died: December 19, 1991 (aged 99); Los Angeles, California
- Occupation: Art director
- Years active: 1940-1962

Martin Felix Obzina (November 20, 1892 – December 19, 1991) was an Austrian-born American art director active in film from 1939 to 1953. Born in Vienna, he studied at the Polytechnic Art School in Vienna. He came to the United States in 1913, attended Iowa State College, and became a naturalized U.S. citizen in 1923. He worked as a stage designer and scenic artist during the 1920s and 1930s before embarking on a career in art direction. His output included more than 50 feature films, for Universal, Monogram, and other studios, and television work during the 1950s and early 1960s. Obzina received two Academy Award nominations in the art direction category. He was nominated for two Academy Awards in the category Best Art Direction.

== Selected filmography ==
Obzina was nominated for two Academy Awards for Best Art Direction:

- The Bachelor's Club (1929)
- First Love (1939)
- The Flame of New Orleans (1941)
- Waco (1952)
- Wild Stallion (1952)
