= Valley of Badmen =

1931 film

- Directed by: Jack Irwin
- Written by: Jack Irwin
- Produced by: Jack Irwin
- Starring: Buddy Roosevelt; Barbara Worth; Tom London
- Production company: Jack Irwin Productions
- Distributed by: Syndicate Pictures
- Release date: 1931
- Running time: 50 minutes
- Country: United States
- Language: English

Valley of Badmen is a 1931 American Western film directed by Jack Irwin and starring Buddy Roosevelt, Barbara Worth and Tom London.

== Plot ==
Simpson inherits a ranch, but before he can take possession he learns that the property has been sold to pay past-due taxes. He investigates the situation and finds that a county official is a criminal.

== Cast ==
- Buddy Roosevelt as Jim Simpson
- Tom London as Horton
- Barbara Worth as Barbara Anderson
- Slim Whitaker

== Bibliography ==
- Michael R. Pitts. Poverty Row Studios, 1929–1940: An Illustrated History of 55 Independent Film Companies, with a Filmography for Each. McFarland & Company, 2005.
