= Dark Stairways =

1924 film directed by Robert F. Hill

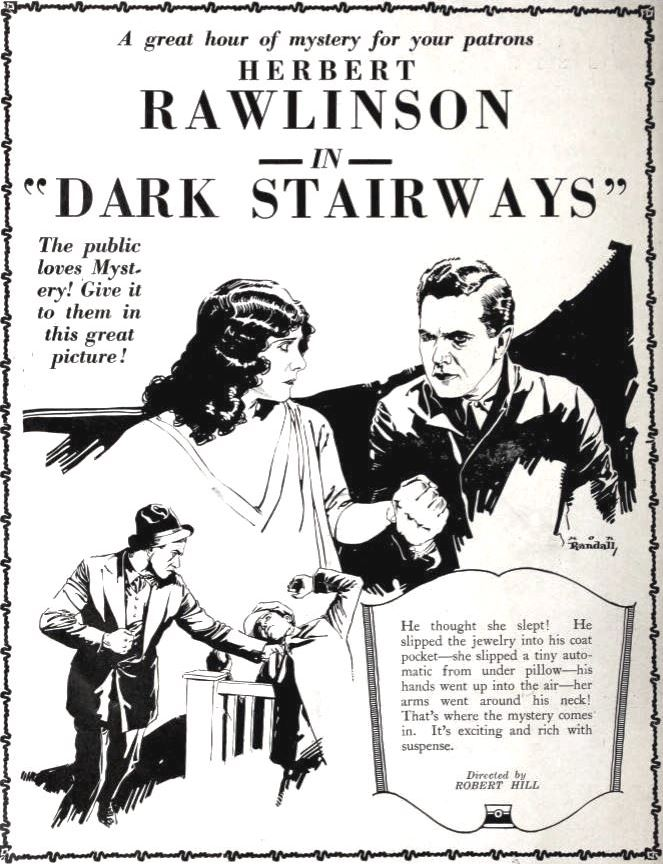
- Advertisement
- Directed by: Robert F. Hill
- Written by: Gordon Rigby
- Story by: Marion Orth
- Produced by: Carl Laemmle
- Starring: Herbert Rawlinson; Ruth Dwyer; Hayden Stevenson
- Cinematography: William Thornley
- Production company: Universal Pictures
- Distributed by: Universal Pictures
- Release date: June 22, 1924
- Running time: 5 reels
- Country: United States
- Language: Silent (English intertitles)

Dark Stairways is a 1924 American silent mystery film directed by Robert F. Hill and starring Herbert Rawlinson, Ruth Dwyer, and Hayden Stevenson.

== Cast ==
- Herbert Rawlinson as Sheldon Polk
- Ruth Dwyer as Sunny Day
- Hayden Stevenson as Frank Farnsworth
- Robert Homans as 'Dippy' Blake (credited as Robert E. Homans)
- Walter Perry as Chris Martin
- Bonnie Hill as Rita Minar
- Kathleen O'Connor as Geraldine Lewis
- Dolores Rousse as Madge Armstrong (credited as Dolores Rousse)
- Emmett King as Henry Polk
- Lola Todd as Stenographer
- Tom McGuire as Police Chief
- Betsy Ann Hisle as Little Girl (uncredited)

== Preservation ==
With no prints of Dark Stairways located in any film archives, it is a lost film.

== Bibliography ==
- Munden, Kenneth White. The American Film Institute Catalog of Motion Pictures Produced in the United States, Part 1. University of California Press, 1997.
