= The Fighting Trooper =

1934 film directed by Ray Taylor

Fighting Trooper
- Directed by: Ray Taylor
- Written by: James Oliver Curwood (novel Footprints); Forrest Sheldon (screenplay)
- Produced by: Maurice Conn
- Starring: See below
- Cinematography: Edgar Lyons
- Edited by: Ted Bellinger
- Release date: November 1, 1934
- Running time: 61 minutes
- Country: United States
- Language: English

Fighting Trooper is a 1934 American Western film directed by Ray Taylor.

The film is also known as The Trooper in the United Kingdom.

== Cast ==
- Kermit Maynard as NWMP Trooper Burke
- Barbara Worth as Diane La Farge
- LeRoy Mason as Andre La Farge
- Charles Delaney as NWMP Constable Blackie
- Robert Frazer as Jim Hatfield
- George Regas as La Farge man Henri
- Walter Miller as NWMP Sergeant Layton
- Joseph W. Girard as NWMP Inspector O'Keefe
- Charles King as Hatfield Henchman Landeau
- George Chesebro as LaFarge man Renee
- Nelson McDowell as Woodsman Nels
- Lafe McKee as Old timer
- Artie Ortego as Indian henchman
