= On Your Toes (1927 film) =

1927 film

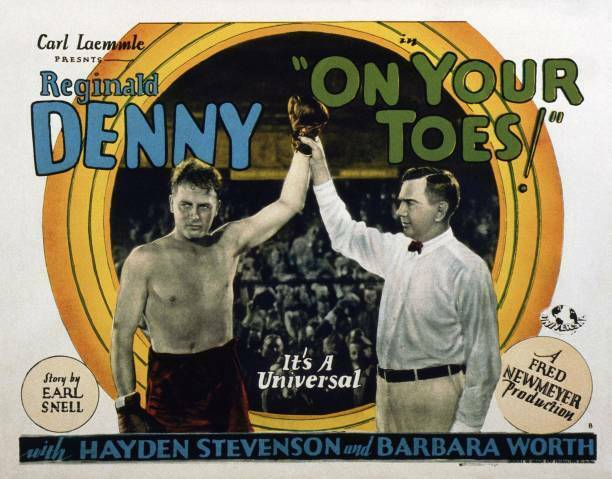
- Lobby card
- Directed by: Fred C. Newmeyer
- Written by: Pierre Couderc; James D. Davis; Gladys Lehman; Earle Snell; Albert DeMond (intertitles)
- Produced by: Carl Laemmle
- Starring: Reginald Denny; Barbara Worth; Hayden Stevenson
- Cinematography: Ross Fisher
- Production company: Universal Pictures
- Distributed by: Universal Pictures
- Release date: November 27, 1927
- Running time: 60 minutes
- Country: United States
- Language: Silent (English intertitles)

On Your Toes is a 1927 American silent comedy film directed by Fred C. Newmeyer and starring Reginald Denny, Barbara Worth, and Hayden Stevenson. It was part of a trend of sports films produced at various Hollywood studios at the time.

== Plot ==
As described in a film magazine, when New York City fight manager Jack Sullivan is insulted by heavyweight ring champion "Punch" Mello insults him, he vows to find a new contender to take the title away from the champ. He drives to Virginia with his daughter Mary to look up Elliott Beresford, who is the son of the former champion Kid Roberts. He finds that Elliott is somewhat of a "sissy" type and is warned by Elliott's grandmother not to tell him of his father's profession. Mary and Elliott are attracted to each other, and when Elliott goes to New York City to open a new dance school, which he runs using an allowance provided by his grandmother, Mary shames him into getting a "man's job". Working as a taxi cab driver, Elliott gets into a jam and ends up knocks out Jack's new protege, so at Mary's urging he decides to try becoming a boxer. In his first match he is defeated but continues on, letting his grandmother continue to believe he is teaching dancing. Finally he is scheduled to fight the champion on the day that his grandmother comes for a visit. After a lot of skirmishing around to keep the truth from her, Elliott gets into the ring. The grandmother hears that he is a fighter and arrives just as the crowd is boo-hooing Elliott for not fighting. She tells Jack to tell Elliott who his father was. Heartened by the knowledge that his father was Kid Roberts, Elliott wins the match and takes Mary into his arms. Everyone cheers.

== Cast ==
- Reginald Denny as Elliott Beresford
- Barbara Worth as Mary Sullivan
- Hayden Stevenson as Jack Sullivan
- Frank Hagney as "Punch" Mello
- Mary Carr as Grandmother
- Gertrude Howard as Mammy
- George West as Mose

== Preservation ==
With no prints of On Your Toes located in any film archives, it is considered a lost film. However, silentera.com says that a print exists.

== Bibliography ==
- Solomon, Aubrey. The Fox Film Corporation, 1915-1935: A History and Filmography. McFarland, 2011.
