= Hayden Stevenson =

American actor

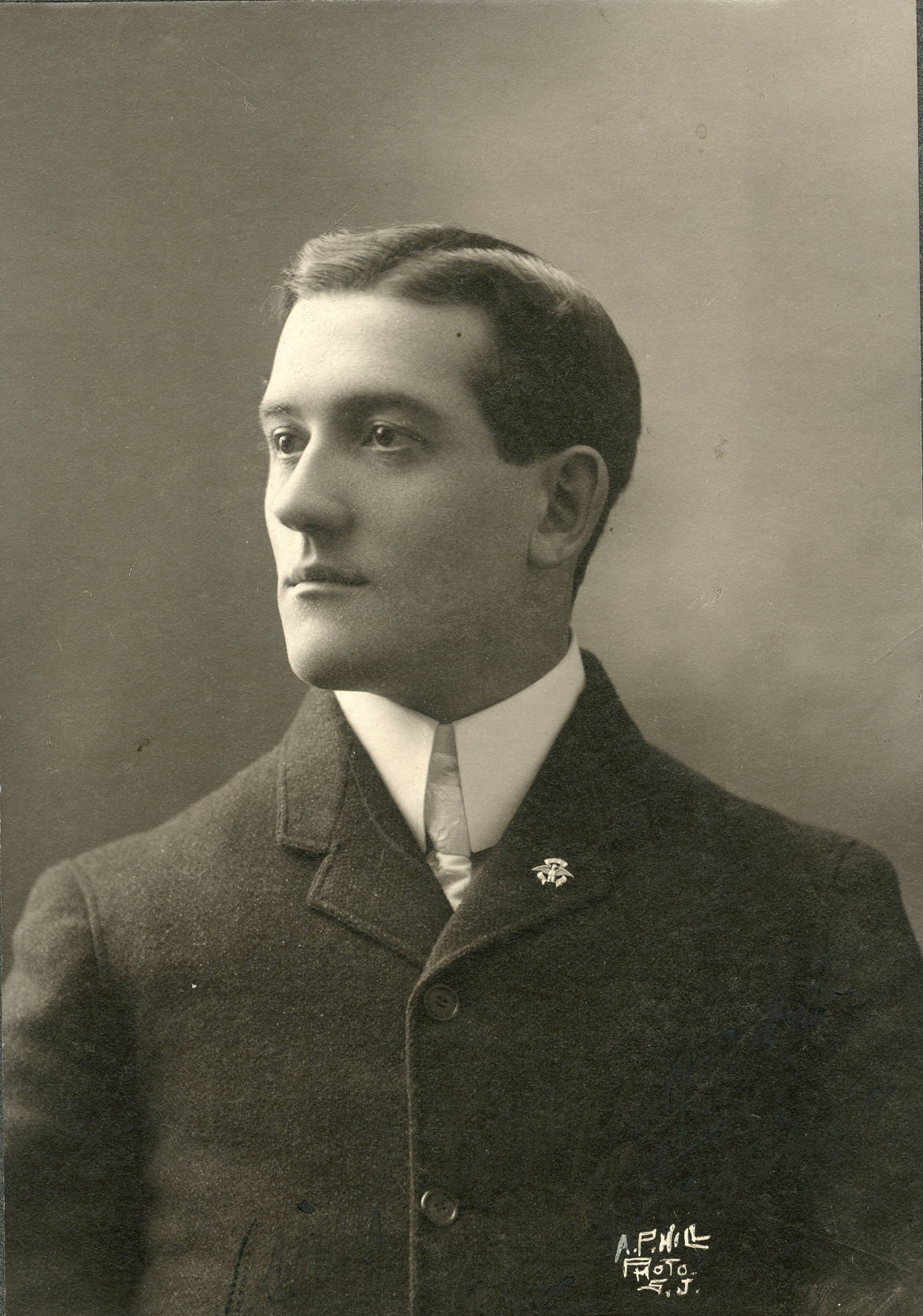
- 1904 portrait
- Born: July 2, 1877; Georgetown, Kentucky, U.S.
- Died: January 31, 1952 (aged 74); Los Angeles, California, U.S.
- Occupation: Actor
- Years active: 1915–1942

Hayden Stevenson (July 2, 1877 – January 31, 1952) was an American film actor. He appeared in 108 films between 1915 and 1942. He was born in Georgetown, Kentucky and died in Los Angeles, California.

== Selected filmography ==
- The Great Divide (1915)
- Where Love Leads (1916)
- Determination (1922)
- Flesh and Spirit (1922)
- The Lone Hand (1922)
- Trifling with Honor (1923)
- The Abysmal Brute (1923)
- The Acquittal (1923)
- The Whispered Name (1924)
- The Law Forbids (1924)
- The Reckless Age (1924)
- Dark Stairways (1924)
- Big Pal (1925)
- I'll Show You the Town (1925)
- The Patent Leather Pug (1925)
- Behind the Front (1926)
- The Devil's Partner (1926)
- The Whole Town's Talking (1926)
- Blake of Scotland Yard (1927)
- Man, Woman and Sin (1927)
- On Your Toes (1927)
- The Fourflusher (1928)
- Freedom of the Press (1928)
- Red Lips (1928)
- Silks and Saddles (1929)
- The Diamond Master (1929)
- College Love (1929)
- Vengeance (1930)
- The Lightning Warrior (1931)
- Woman Trap (1936)
- Federal Agent (1936)
