= Robert Homans =

American actor (1877–1947)

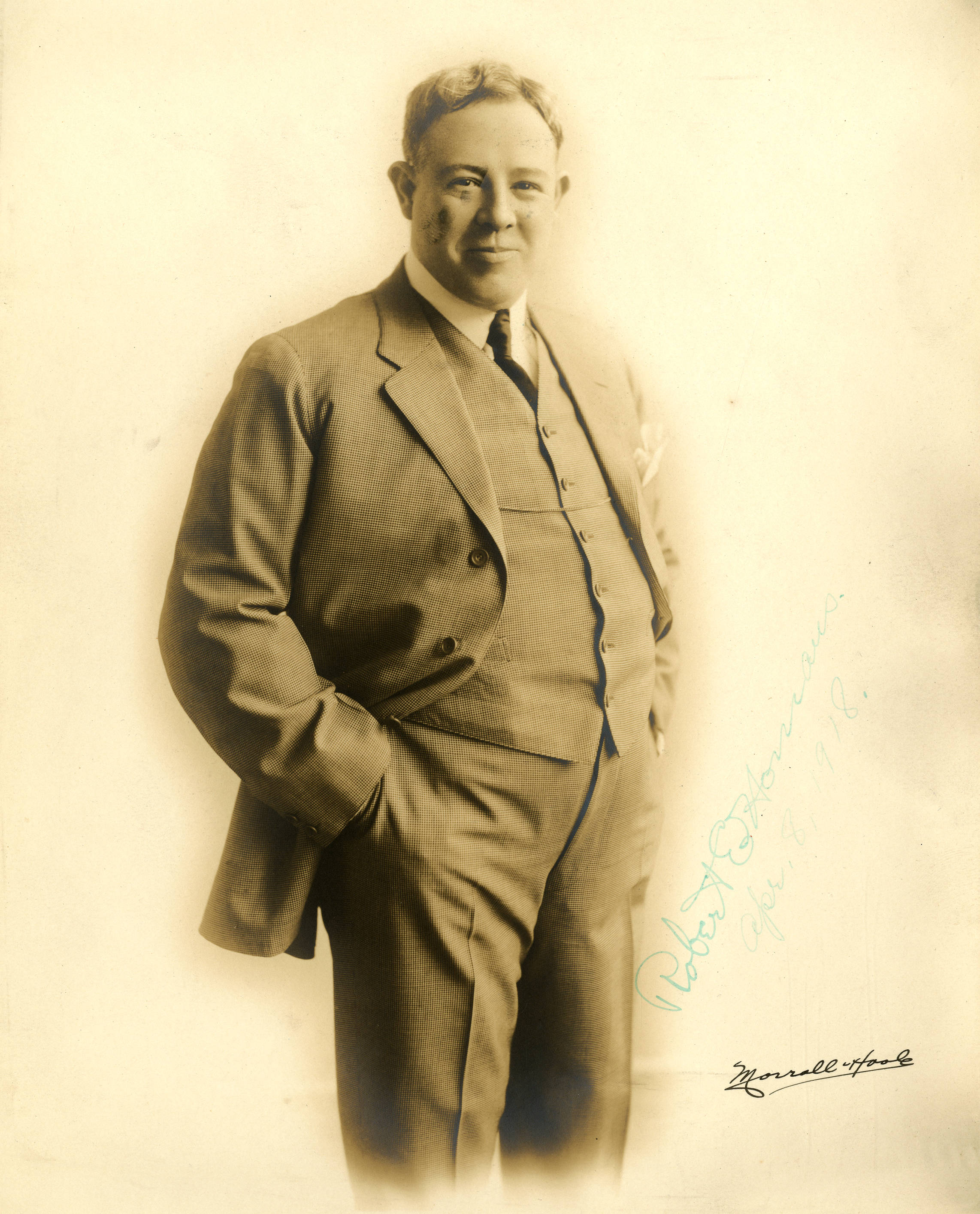
- Homans in 1918
- Born: Robert Edward Homans; November 8, 1877; Malden, Massachusetts, U.S
- Died: July 28, 1947 (aged 69); Los Angeles, California, U.S.
- Occupation: Actor
- Years active: 1917–1946
- Spouse: Agnes Mary Josephine Mellon (m. 1909; died 1944)
- Children: 1

Robert Edward Homans (November 8, 1877 – July 28, 1947) was an American actor who entered films in 1923 after a lengthy stage career.

== Life and career ==
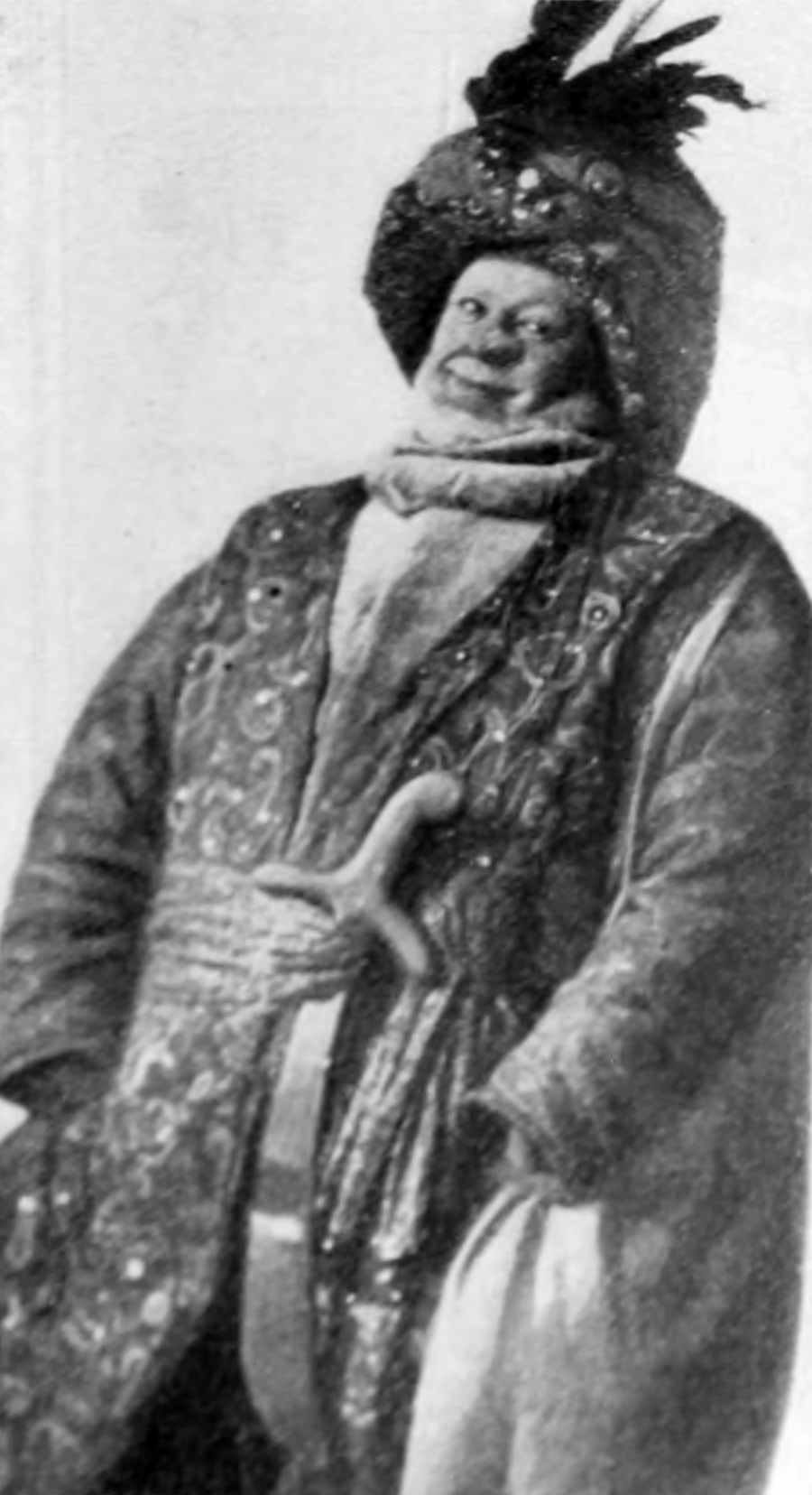
Robert Homans as "Bread" in the Broadway production of The Blue Bird (1910)

Robert Homans was born November 8, 1877, in Malden, Massachusetts. Although he studied medicine for three years after his college graduation, a 1906 newspaper article noted that "the 'stage bee' got into his bonnet and nothing would do but that he become an actor." His Broadway credits include The Blue Bird (1910), The Blue Envelope (1915), Johnny, Get Your Gun (1916) and Like a King (1921).

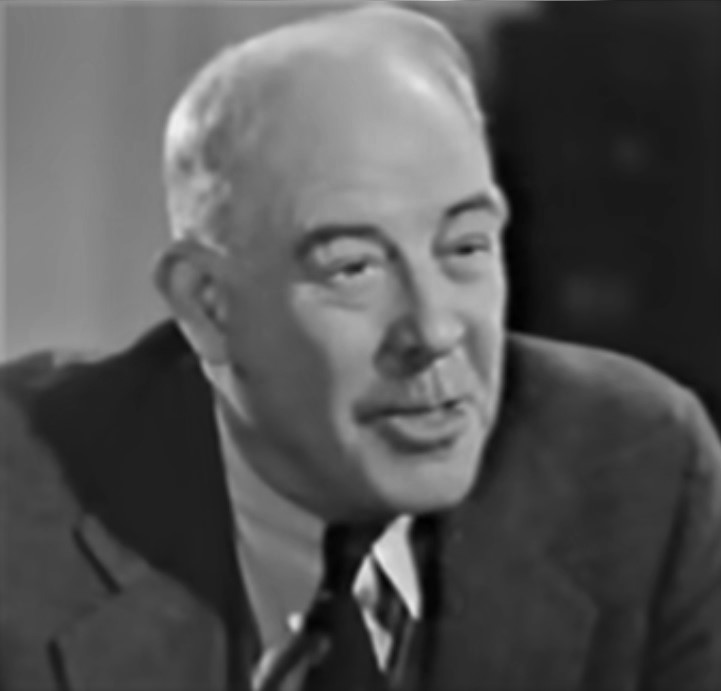
Homans in The 13th Man (1939)

His screen debut came in Madame Sherry. He appeared in some 400 films between 1917 and 1946.

On April 18, 1909, Homans married Agnes J. Mellon in San Francisco. Another source gives his wife's name as Agnes Maynard.

Homans died in Los Angeles, California on July 28, 1947, from a heart attack.

== Filmography ==
- Madame Sherry (1917) as Minor Role
- Legally Dead (1923) as Detective Powell
- Dark Stairways (1924) as Detective Quinn
- The Breathless Moment (1924) as 'Dippy' Blake
- The Bandit Buster (1926) as Romeo
- College Days (1926) as Mr. Gordon
- The Silent Power (1926) as David Webster
- Ride 'em High (1927) as Rufus Allen
- Range Courage (1927) as Pop Gallagher
- The Prairie King (1927) as Jim Gardner
- Pals in Peril (1927) as Sheriff Kipp
- Mountains of Manhattan (1927) as Big Bill Wright
- Fast and Furious (1927) as Doctor
- Coquette (1929) as Court Bailiff (uncredited)
- The Valiant (1929) as Newspaper Printer (uncredited)
- Fury of the Wild (1929) as Matt Roark
- The Isle of Lost Ships (1929) as Mr. Burke
- The Thoroughbred (1930) as Riley
- Born Reckless (1930) as Policeman (uncredited)
- For the Defense (1930) as Lineup Lieutenant (uncredited)
- Abraham Lincoln (1930) as Senator (uncredited)
- The Public Enemy (1931) as Officer Pat Burke (uncredited)
- The Lightning Flyer (1931) as John Nelson
- The Drums of Jeopardy (1931) as Detective
- The Black Camel (1931) as Chief of Police (uncredited)
- Pack Up Your Troubles (1932) as Detective (uncredited)
- If I Had a Million (1932) as Detective (uncredited)
- She Done Him Wrong (1933) as Doheney
- Hallelujah, I'm a Bum (1933) as Cop (uncredited)
- Mystery of the Wax Museum (1933) as Desk Sergeant (uncredited)
- Tugboat Annie (1933) as Old Salt on Schooner (uncredited)
- One Sunday Afternoon (1933) as Officer Charlie Brown (uncredited)
- Blood Money (1933) as Detective Posing as Drunk (uncredited)
- Lady Killer (1933) as Jailer (uncredited)
- Jimmy the Gent (1934) as Paddy - Irish Cop (uncredited)
- The Thin Man (1934) as Billy the Detective (uncredited)
- The Key (1934) as Patrick the Bartender (uncredited)
- The Lemon Drop Kid (1934) as Sheriff (uncredited)
- The Whole Town's Talking (1935) as Detective (uncredited)
- The Informer (1935) as Detractor (uncredited)
- Steamboat Round the Bend (1935) as Race Official (uncredited)
- She Married Her Boss (1935) as Detective (uncredited)
- Suicide Squad (1935) as Captain Tim O'Connor
- Barbary Coast (1935) as Fogged-in Ship's Captain (uncredited)
- The Prisoner of Shark Island (1936) as Sergeant (uncredited)
- Her Master's Voice (1936) as Stationmaster (uncredited)
- Fury (1936) as Incoming Watchman (uncredited)
- Mary of Scotland (1936) as Jailer (uncredited)
- Charlie Chan at the Race Track (1936) as Judge (uncredited)
- Come and Get It (1936) as Cookie (uncredited)
- The Plough and the Stars (1936) as Barman
- Black Legion (1937) as Motorcycle Cop (uncredited)
- A Star Is Born (1937) as Bailiff (uncredited)
- Parnell (1937) as Irish Cop in New York (uncredited)
- Dead End (1937) as Policeman on Morning Beat (uncredited)
- Stella Dallas (1937) as Policeman Outside Wedding (uncredited)
- Gold Is Where You Find It (1938) as Miner Grogan (uncredited)
- Angels with Dirty Faces (1938) as Policeman (uncredited)
- Stagecoach (1939) as Ed - Editor (uncredited)
- Dodge City (1939) as Mail Clerk (uncredited)
- Union Pacific (1939) as Man (uncredited)
- Young Mr. Lincoln (1939) as Mr. Clay (uncredited)
- Scandal Sheet (1939)
- The Oklahoma Kid (1939) as Bartender (uncredited)
- The Saint Strikes Back (1939) as Policer Officer Moriarity (uncredited)
- Swanee River (1939) as Sheriff (uncredited)
- The Grapes of Wrath (1940) as Spencer
- Johnny Apollo (1940) as Receptionist Guard (uncredited)
- Virginia City (1940) as Southerner (uncredited)
- Beyond Tomorrow (1940) as Sergeant
- Lillian Russell (1940) as Stage Doorman
- A Dispatch from Reuter's (1940) as Reporter (uncredited)
- Out of the Fog (1941) as Officer Magruder
- A Man Betrayed (1941) as Traffic Policeman (uncredited)
- Life Begins for Andy Hardy (1941) as Mr. Hood (uncredited)
- Unexpected Uncle (1941) as Police Sergeant (uncredited)
- It Started with Eve (1941) as Railway Conductor (uncredited)
- The Maltese Falcon (1941) as Policeman (uncredited)
- Unholy Partners (1941) as Insp. Pat Brody (uncredited)
- Nazi Agent (1942) as 1st Captain (uncredited)
- Reap the Wild Wind (1942) as Captain in Cafe (uncredited)
- The Spoilers (1942) as Sea Captain (uncredited)
- In Old California (1942) as Marshal Alvin Thompson (uncredited)
- Holiday Inn (1942) as Pop (uncredited)
- Night Monster (1942) as Constable Cap Beggs
- For Me and My Gal (1942) as Palace Doorman (uncredited)
- I Married a Witch (1942) as Fire Chief (uncredited)
- No Time for Love (1943) as Pop Murphy (uncredited)
- Sweet Rosie O'Grady (1943) as Barney
- Jack London (1943) as Captain Allen
- Cover Girl (1944) as Pop - Doorman (uncredited)
- It Happened Tomorrow (1944) as Mulcahey - Policeman (uncredited)
- Buffalo Bill (1944) as Policeman Muldoon (uncredited)
- Pin Up Girl (1944) as Stage Doorman (uncredited)
- The Adventures of Mark Twain (1944) as Policeman (uncredited)
- Make Your Own Bed (1944) as Policeman (uncredited)
- Christmas Holiday (1944) as Policeman (uncredited)
- Nothing But Trouble (1944) as Jailer (uncredited)
- Can't Help Singing (1944) as Albert (uncredited)
- Louisiana Hayride (1944) as Police Officer Conlon
- The Thin Man Goes Home (1945) as Railroad Clerk (uncredited)
- The Clock (1945) as Blood Test Official (uncredited)
- A Medal for Benny (1945) as Police Chief (uncredited)
- The Scarlet Clue (1945) as Capt. Flynn
- They Were Expendable (1945) as Bartender (uncredited)
- Anchors Aweigh (1945) as Old Cop (uncredited)
- Because of Him (1946) as Police Sergeant (uncredited)
- Cluny Brown (1946) as New York Policeman (uncredited)
- The Strange Love of Martha Ivers (1946) as Gallagher (uncredited)
- No Leave, No Love (1946) as Railroad Ticket-Taker (uncredited)
