= Fast and Furious (1927 film) =

1927 film

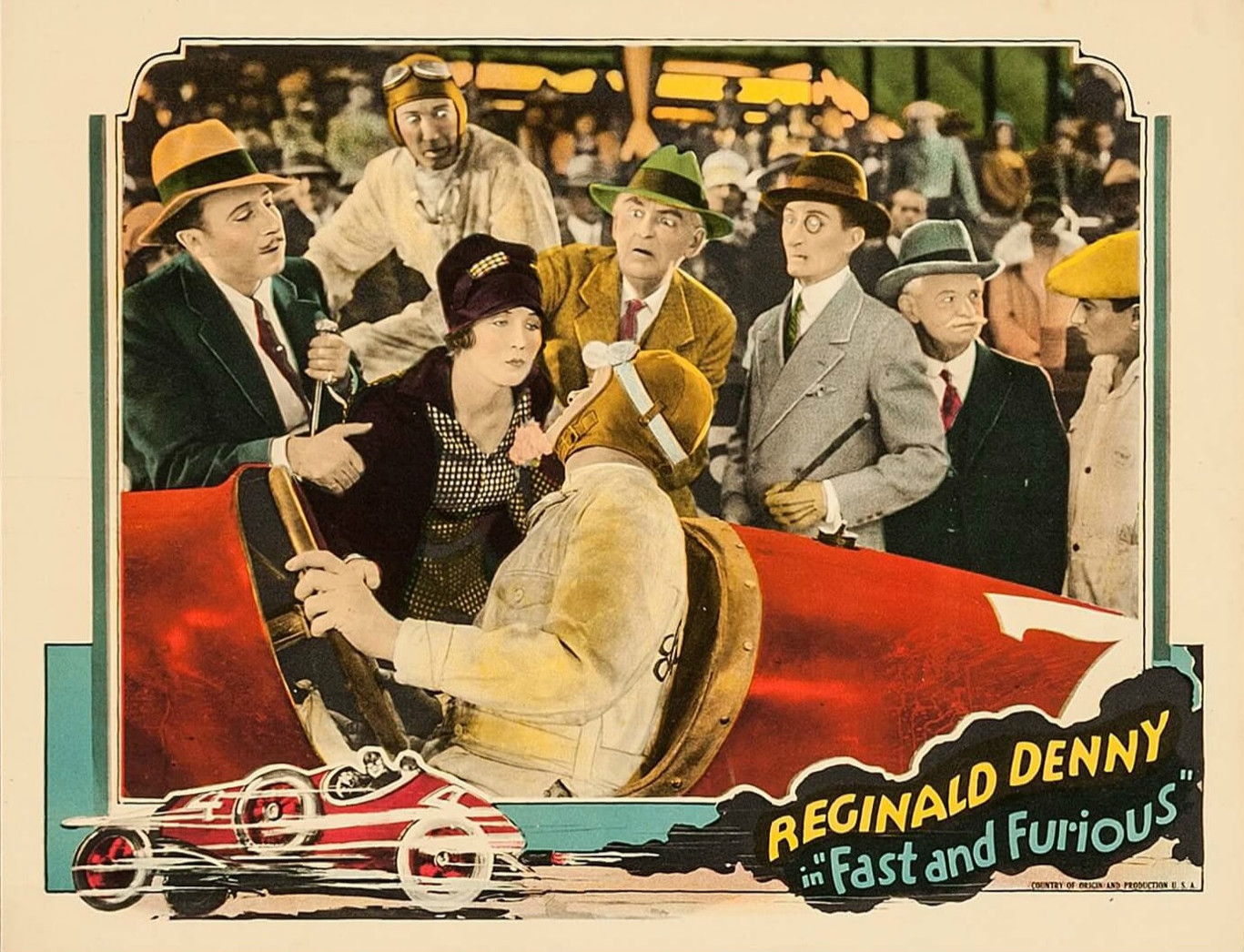
- Lobby card
- Directed by: Melville W. Brown
- Written by: Raymond Cannon; Reginald Denny (story)
- Produced by: Carl Laemmle
- Starring: Reginald Denny; Barbara Worth; Claude Gillingwater; Armand Kaliz
- Cinematography: Arthur L. Todd
- Production company: Universal Pictures
- Distributed by: Universal Pictures
- Release date: June 12, 1927
- Running time: 64 minutes
- Country: United States
- Language: Silent (English intertitles)

Fast and Furious is a 1927 American silent comedy film directed by Melville W. Brown and written by Raymond Cannon and Reginald Denny. The film stars Reginald Denny, Barbara Worth, Claude Gillingwater, and Armand Kaliz. The film was released on June 12, 1927, by Universal Pictures.

== Cast ==
- Reginald Denny as Tom Brown
- Barbara Worth as Ethel
- Claude Gillingwater as Smithfield
- Armand Kaliz as Dupont
- Lee Moran as Joe
- Charles K. French as Hodge
- Wilson Benge as Coachman
- Robert E. Homans as Doctor
- Kingsley Benedict as Shorty
- Edgar Norton as Englishman

== Preservation ==
A copy of Fast and Furious is housed at the Cineteca Italiana film archive in Italy.
