= The Prairie King =

1927 film

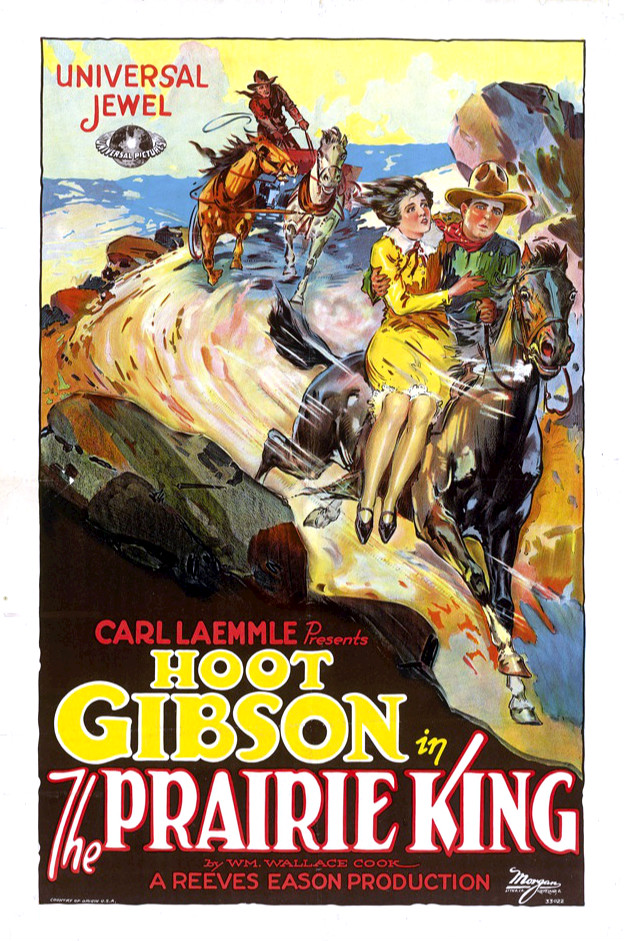
- Film poster
- Directed by: B. Reeves Eason
- Written by: Frank Howard Clark
- Based on: a screen story by William Wallace Cook
- Produced by: Carl Laemmle
- Starring: Hoot Gibson
- Cinematography: Harry Neumann
- Distributed by: Universal Pictures (Jewel tiered branding)
- Release date: May 15, 1927
- Running time: 60 minutes; 6 reels; 5,685 feet (1,733 m)
- Country: United States
- Languages: Silent; English intertitles

The Prairie King is a 1927 American silent Western film directed by B. Reeves Eason and starring Hoot Gibson. It was produced and distributed by Universal Pictures.

== Cast ==
- Hoot Gibson as Andy Barden
- Barbara Worth as Edna Jordan
- Charles Sellon as Pop Wingate
- Rosa Gore as Aunt Hattie
- Albert Prisco as Dan Murdock
- Robert Homans as Jim Gardner
- George Periolat as Ramon Fernandez

== Preservation ==
- Copies are held at the Library of Congress, Packard Campus for Audio-Visual Conservation and Filmoteca de Catalunya, Barcelona.
