= The Thoroughbred (1930 film) =

1930 film

- Directed by: Richard Thorpe
- Written by: Jack Natteford
- Starring: Wesley Barry; Judith Barrett; Pauline Garon
- Cinematography: Max Dupont
- Edited by: Clarence Kolster
- Production company: Tiffany Pictures
- Distributed by: Tiffany Pictures; Gaumont British Distributors (UK)
- Release date: August 10, 1930
- Running time: 57 minutes
- Country: United States
- Language: English

The Thoroughbred is a 1930 American pre-Code sports drama film directed by Richard Thorpe and starring Wesley Barry, Judith Barrett, and Pauline Garon. It was produced and distributed by Tiffany Pictures. It was released the same year in Britain by Gaumont British under the alternative title, Riding to Win.

== Plot ==
Aspiring young jockey Tod Taylor gets caught in a long-running rivalry between racehorse owners Donovan and Riley while romancing Colleen, the daughter of the latter.

== Cast ==
- Wesley Barry as Tod Taylor
- Judith Barrett as Colleen Riley
- Pauline Garon as Margie
- Larry Steers as Tom Drake
- Robert Homans as Riley
- Walter Perry as Donovan
- Onest Conley as Ham Tolliver
- Mildred Washington as Purple Washington
- Madame Sul-Te-Wan as Sacharine
- George Cleveland as Detective
- Clarence Muse as Stablehand

== Bibliography ==
- Pitts, Michael R. Poverty Row Studios, 1929-1940. McFarland & Company, 1997.
