= Robert Kent (actor) =

American actor (1908–1955)

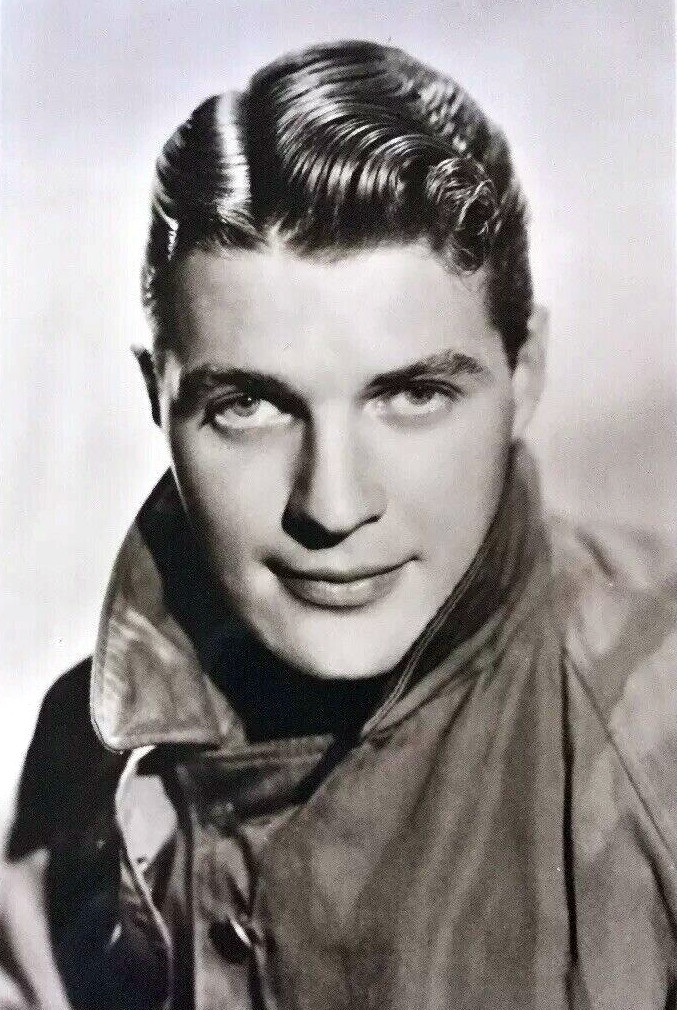
- Born: Douglas Blackley, Jr. December 3, 1908; Hartford, Connecticut, U.S.
- Died: May 4, 1955 (aged 46); Los Angeles, California, U.S.
- Occupation: Film actor
- Years active: 1934–1955
- Spouse: Astrid Allwyn (m. 1937; div. 1941)
- Children: 3

Robert Kent (born Douglas Blackley, Jr.; December 3, 1908 – May 4, 1955), was an American film actor. His career included starring roles in several film serials of the 1940s, including The Phantom Creeps, Who's Guilty?, and The Phantom Rider. He also had a role in the 1938 film The Gladiator and was Virginia Vale's leading man in Blonde Comet, a 1941 movie about a female racing driver.

He married actress Astrid Allwyn in Tijuana, Mexico, on January 10, 1937, and they were divorced in 1941. He had three children: Kristina, Susan, and Kim Louise. He died in Los Angeles, California of a coronary occlusion due to coronary arteriosclerosis.

== Partial filmography ==
- One Hour Late (1934) as Soda Jerk (uncredited)
- Car 99 (1935) as Recruit Blatzky
- Four Hours to Kill! (1935) as George Nelson
- Love in Bloom (1935) as Man Who Buys Song (uncredited)
- College Scandal (1935) as Dan Courtridge
- Two for Tonight (1935) as College Boy (uncredited)
- Ship Cafe (1935) as Jimmy (uncredited)
- Love Before Breakfast (1936) as First College Boy (uncredited)
- The Country Beyond (1936) as Cpl. Robert King
- The Crime of Dr. Forbes (1936) as Dr. Michael Forbes
- King of the Royal Mounted (1936) as RCMP Sgt. King
- Dimples (1936) as Allen Drew
- Reunion (1936) as Tony Luke
- Nancy Steele Is Missing! (1937) as Jimmie Wilson
- Step Lively, Jeeves! (1937) as Gerry Townsend
- That I May Live (1937) as Dick Mannion
- Angel's Holiday (1937) as Nick Moore
- Born Reckless (1937) as Lee Martin
- The 13th Man (1937) as Jack Winslow (uncredited)
- Charlie Chan at Monte Carlo (1937) as Gordon Chase
- Mr. Moto Takes a Chance (1938) as Marty Weston
- Highway Patrol (1938) as Patrolman (uncredited)
- The Gladiator (1938) as Tom Dixon
- Wanted by the Police (1938) as Policeman Mike O'Leary
- Gang Bullets (1938) as John Carter
- Little Orphan Annie (1938) as Johnny Adams
- The Phantom Creeps (1939) as Capt. Bob West
- Convict's Code (1939) as Dave Tyler
- Almost a Gentleman (1939) as Robert Mabrey
- East Side of Heaven (1939) as Cyrus Barrett Jr.
- For Love or Money (1939) as Ted Frazier
- Andy Hardy Gets Spring Fever (1939) as Ensign Copley
- The Secret of Dr. Kildare (1939) as Charles Herron
- Calling All Marines (1939) as Minor Role (uncredited)
- One Million B.C. (1940) as Mountain Guide (uncredited)
- Sunset in Wyoming (1941) as Larry Drew
- Twilight on the Trail (1941) as Ash Drake
- Niagara Falls (1941) as Hotel Guest (uncredited)
- Blonde Comet (1941) as Jim Flynn
- Tillie the Toiler (1941)
- Stagecoach Express (1942) as Griff Williams
- The Forest Rangers (1942) as Lookout (uncredited)
- Stand by for Action (1942) as Hank Nels (uncredited)
- Yanks Ahoy (1943) as Lt. Reeves
- Find the Blackmailer (1943) as Mark Harper
- Northern Pursuit (1943) as Soldier (uncredited)
- Gung Ho! (1943) as Submarine Navigator Robinson (uncredited)
- What a Man! (1944) as Steven M. Anderson
- Hot Rhythm (1944) as Herman Strohbach
- What Next, Corporal Hargrove? (1945) as Lt. Dillon
- Who's Guilty? (1945) as Bob Stewart
- The Phantom Rider (1946, Serial) as Dr. Jim Sterling / The Phantom Rider
- Blonde Alibi (1946) as Detective (uncredited)
- Joe Palooka, Champ (1946) as Ronnie Brewster
- Shoot to Kill (1947) as Dixie Logan
- Jungle Flight (1947) as Andy Melton
- Dragnet (1947) as Police Lt. Ricco
- Big Town After Dark (1947) as Jake Sebastian
- The Counterfeiters (1948) as Tony Richards
- Wild Weed (1949) as Lt. Mason
- Radar Secret Service (1950) as Benson as Henchman
- Federal Agent at Large (1950) as Harry Monahan
- The Skipper Surprised His Wife (1950) as Radio Technician (uncredited)
- For Heaven's Sake (1950) as Roger Blake, Joe's Father (uncredited)
- The Wild Blue Yonder (1951) as General (uncredited)
- Rebel City (1953) as Captain Ramsey
- The Country Girl (1954) as Paul Unger
- The Great Locomotive Chase (1956) as A Switchman (posthumous release; final film role)
