= Chain of Evidence (film) =

Film directed by Paul Landres

- Directed by: Paul Landres
- Written by: Elwood Ullman
- Produced by: Ben Schwalb
- Starring: Bill Elliott; Jimmy Lydon; Don Haggerty
- Cinematography: Harry Neumann
- Edited by: Neil Brunnenkant
- Music by: Marlin Skiles
- Production company: Allied Artists
- Distributed by: Allied Artists
- Release date: January 6, 1957
- Running time: 64 minutes
- Country: United States
- Language: English

Chain of Evidence is a 1957 American crime film noir directed by Paul Landres and starring Bill Elliott, Jimmy Lydon, and Don Haggerty. It was the fourth in a series of five films featuring Elliott as a detective in the Los Angeles County Sheriff's Office made by Allied Artists.

== Cast ==
- Bill Elliott as Lt. Andy Doyle
- Jimmy Lydon as Steve Nordstrom
- Don Haggerty as Sgt. Mike Duncan
- Claudia Barrett as Harriet Owens
- Tina Carver as Claire Ramsey
- Ross Elliott as Bob Bradfield
- Meg Randall as Polly Gunther
- Timothy Carey as Carl Fowler
- John Bleifer as Jake Habermann
- Dabbs Greer as Dr. Ainsley
- John Close as Deputy

== See also ==
- Dial Red O (1955)
- Sudden Danger (1955)
- Calling Homicide (1956)
- Footsteps in the Night (1957)
- List of American films of 1957
