= Dial Red O =

- Directed by: Daniel B. Ullman
- Written by: Daniel B. Ullman
- Produced by: Vincent M. Fennelly
- Starring: Bill Elliott; Helene Stanley; Keith Larsen
- Cinematography: Ellsworth Fredericks
- Edited by: William Austin
- Music by: Marlin Skiles
- Production company: Allied Artists
- Distributed by: Allied Artists
- Release date: March 13, 1955
- Running time: 63 minutes
- Country: United States
- Language: English

Dial Red O is a 1955 American film noir crime film written and directed by Daniel B. Ullman and starring Bill Elliott, Helene Stanley, and Keith Larsen. It was the first in a series of five Los Angeles-set police thrillers that Elliott made for Allied Artists at the end of his career.

The letter "O" in the title actually represents a zero, since it is supposed to be the number on a phone dial.

== Plot ==
Ralph Wyatt, an ex-Marine war hero, is under observation at a Veterans Administration hospital. He receives a letter containing a divorce decree. This alarms him so much that he escapes from the institution to see his wife Connie. He can't find her immediately, because she is keeping company with local realtor Norman Roper -- who happens to be one of Wyatt's Marine buddies. Connie tells Norman that she filed for divorce in Ralph's absence, and now she is free to marry Norman. Norman is unprepared for this news, and when Connie threatens and slaps him sharply, he silences her -- for good -- with three violent judo moves. Norman panics and flees her apartment.

When Ralph arrives at the apartment, he is arrested and jailed for Connie's murder. Detective lieutenant Andy Flynn of the Hollywood sheriff's office, investigating the case, gathers information and pieces it together. Ralph breaks jail, bent on avenging his wife's death, and Lt. Flynn must recapture him and find the real killer.

== Cast ==
- Bill Elliott as Detective Lt. Andy Flynn
- Helene Stanley as Connie Wyatt
- Keith Larsen as Ralph Wyatt
- Paul Picerni as Norman Roper
- Jack Kruschen as Lloyd Lavalle, neighbor
- Elaine Riley as Policewoman Gloria
- Robert Bice as Sgt. Tony Columbo
- Rick Vallin as Deputy Clark
- George Eldredge as Major Sutter, hospital director
- John Phillips as Deputy Morgan
- Regina Gleason as Mrs. Roper
- Rankin Mansfield as Coroner
- Mort Mills as Newspaper photographer
- William Tannen as Devon, Newspaper reporter
- Shorty Rogers and His Giants as Jazz musicians

== Production ==
The film's working titles were Code 3 and Dial 116.

== Reception ==
This was cowboy star Bill Elliott's first non-western in 17 years. The Exhibitor called it "A well-made little film following a logical pattern and yarn that is interesting throughout. This entry presents Bill Elliott is a switch from westerns, and he does fine. The cast is good and the direction and production are in the smart and efficient category. It should make a neat addition to the program." Trade publisher Pete Harrison agreed: "A very good program picture. It has been so well directed and acted that the characters are believable in whatever they do. Their actions ring true. Bill Elliott does fine work as a lieutenant in the sheriff's office, but the exhibitors who play the picture should make it clear that it is a modern-day melodrama and not a western. There is no comedy relief."

Elliott's character of Andy Flynn had to be changed in subsequent pictures to Andy Doyle, because there was already an Andy Flynn working in Los Angeles law enforcement.

== See also ==
- Sudden Danger (1955)
- Calling Homicide (1956)
- Chain of Evidence (1957)
- Footsteps in the Night (1957)
- List of American films of 1955

== Bibliography ==
- Mayer, Geoff. Encyclopedia of American Film Serials. McFarland, 13 2017.
