= Sager orphans =

Orphans during the American westward migration

The Sager orphans (sometimes referred to as the Sager children) were the children of Henry and Naomi Sager. In April 1844 the Sager family took part in the great westward migration, taking the Oregon Trail. During the journey both Henry and Naomi died, leaving their seven children orphaned. Later adopted by Marcus and Narcissa Whitman, missionaries in what is now Washington, they were orphaned a second time, when both their new parents, as well as brothers John and Francis Sager, were killed during the Whitman massacre in November 1847. About 1860 Catherine, the oldest daughter, wrote a first-hand account of their journey across the plains and their life with the Whitmans. Today it is regarded as one of the most authentic accounts of the American westward migration.

The children's names were (from oldest to youngest):

- John Carney Sager (born 1831 in Union County, Ohio)
- Francis "Frank" Sager (born 1833 in Union County, Ohio)
- Catherine Carney Sager (born April 15, 1835, in Union County, Ohio)
- Elizabeth Marie Sager (born July 6, 1837, in Union County, Ohio)
- Matilda Jane Sager (born October 6, 1839, in Buchanan County, Missouri)
- Hannah Louise "Louisa" Sager (born 1841 in Platte County, Missouri)
- Henrietta Naomi "Rosanna" Sager (born May 30, 1844, along the Oregon Trail in present-day Kansas)

== Before the Oregon Trail ==
Henry Sager was described as a "restless one" by his daughter, Catherine. Before 1844 he had moved his growing family three times. Starting in Virginia they moved to Ohio, and later to Indiana. In 1839 they settled on a farm in Platte County, Missouri. Sager also worked as a blacksmith. The couple decided to head for Oregon, which Naomi thought had a more healthful climate. In late autumn 1843, they sold the farm and moved to St. Joseph, Missouri, a jump-off point for the Oregon Trail, where they stayed the winter. By then Naomi was pregnant with her seventh child. In March 1844 Henry joined a group of pioneers who called themselves The Independent Colony.

== On the Oregon Trail ==
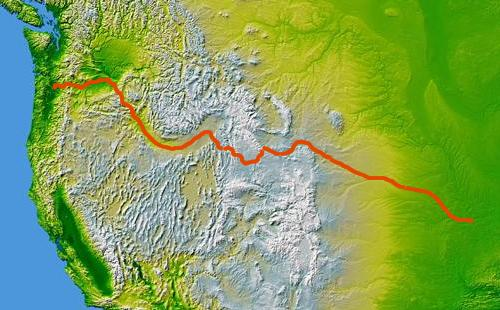
The route of the Independent Colony

At the end of April 1844, the Independent Colony, 300 people in 72 covered wagons, crossed the Missouri River and started out on the 2,000-mile (3,200 km) journey along the Oregon Trail. The company was under the command of Captain William T. Shaw, a veteran of the war of 1812, who was traveling with his wife, Sally, and six children. The Sagers joined the wagon train at Weston, Missouri. After five weeks on the trail Naomi gave birth to their seventh child, a girl named Henrietta. Due to the delivery, she was weakened and only slowly regained her strength.

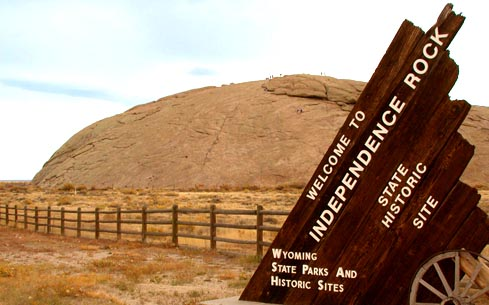
Independence Rock State Historic Site

On July 4, 1844, the Independent Colony celebrated Independence Day on the banks of the Platte River. A couple of days later, while crossing its south fork, Naomi was severely injured as the Sager wagon overturned in the shallow waters along the bank. But the pioneers pressed on. At the end of July 1844 the wagon train passed Chimney Rock, a famous landmark along the trail in what is now Nebraska. It was the reminder that the Great Plains were almost crossed and the Rocky Mountains lay right ahead.

A few hours before reaching Fort Laramie, Catherine caught her dress on an axe handle when she jumped out of the moving wagon. Her left leg, trapped beneath one of the heavy wheels, was broken several times, an event that could have easily been fatal under the medical and sanitary conditions of that situation. But due to the immediate treatment by Henry and Dr. Dagon, a German-born doctor, her leg was eventually saved. She, however, was confined to the wagon for the rest of the journey. From Fort Laramie onward, Dr. Dagon stayed with the Sagers in order to care for her injury. Thus the wagon train moved on and a couple of days later the Independent Colony reached Independence Rock in present-day Wyoming, where some of the travelers carved their names into the granite rock.

== The deaths of Henry and Naomi Sager ==
On August 23, 1844, the wagon train reached South Pass, a high plains pass that is on the Continental Divide. During the descent into the Green River valley some of the travelers fell ill due to an outbreak of camp fever. Amongst those suffering was Henry. After crossing the Green River, two women and a child were already dead. Henry took a turn for the worse and was laid up in the wagon next to Catherine, who said that during his last night, "Captain Shaw found him weeping bitterly. He said his last hour had come, and his heart was filled with anguish for his family. His wife was ill, the children small, and one likely to be a cripple. They had no relatives near, and a long journey lay before them. In piteous tones he begged the Captain to take charge of them and see them through." He was buried on the banks of the Green River in an improvised coffin. His body was later disinterred, and the coyote-gnawed bones were discovered a year later by subsequent travelers.

Naomi, still weakened from childbirth and mourning Henry, now had all the responsibility for the seven children. She contracted Typhus shortly after Henry died. Suffering from heavy fever she became delirious and finally requested Dr. Dagon to squire the children to Marcus Whitman, a missionary in the Walla Walla Valley of what is now southeastern Washington. She died 26 days after Henry near present-day Twin Falls, Idaho. Her last words were "Oh Henry, if you only knew how we have suffered". As there was no lumber available, she was buried wrapped in a bedsheet. John, the oldest child, carved the words Naomi Carney Sager, age 37 out of a wooden headboard and thus marked the shallow grave. The children, the youngest three months and the oldest fourteen years, were left orphaned.

The adults of the wagon train collectively took care of the Sager children for the rest of the trip, with William Shaw and his wife Sally taking a particularly active role in caring for and feeding the older six children, and a different woman caring for the baby for the duration of the journey. The train ran out of food besides meat during the journey, and the Shaws split even their last loaf of bread with the Sager children.

Henrietta, the baby, was severely ill at the time they reached the Whitman mission, and they did not expect her to survive.

== Marcus and Narcissa Whitman ==
Marcus was a physician and a Protestant missionary. In 1836 he and Narcissa, together with a group of other missionaries, joined a caravan of fur traders and traveled west, establishing several missions as well as their own settlement. Located in the Walla Walla Valley on the northern end of the Blue Mountains near the present day city of Walla Walla, Washington, it was in the territory of both the Nez Percé and the Cayuse Native American tribes. The latter called it Waiilatpu (Why-ee-lat-poo, the 't' is half silent), which means "place of the rye grass" in the Cayuse language. Marcus farmed and provided medical care, while Narcissa set up a school for the Native American children.

In the early days, life was peaceful at the Whitman Mission, but within a year, it became clear that Whitman was not going to pay for the land where the mission had been established, as previously promised, and tensions between Whitman and the Cayuse mounted over Whitman's refusal to pay. Other major sources of tension were that the Whitmans tried to prevent the Cayuse from spending time in their Mission House resulting in them providing lower quality medical care for the Cayuse than they did for white settlers, and the fact that after it became clear that the Cayuse preferred the Catholic missionaries to the Whitmans, Marcus began aggressively preaching damnation.

In 1837 Narcissa Whitman, aged 29, gave birth to a daughter, Alice Clarissa. Two years later, she was distracted for a moment and Alice drowned in the nearby Walla Walla River, having gone there to fill her cup with water. In an attempt to regain some sense of family she began taking care of other children. Soon four were in their custody, including the daughters of mountain men Joseph Meek and Jim Bridger. In early October 1844, the Independent Colony reached the Whitman Mission, and the Sager orphans found a new home with the Whitmans. Narcissa was keen to adopt Henrietta, but not the other children. Marcus wanted to adopt the boys. William Shaw told them that he had promised Naomi that he would try keep her children together in the same family, and made Marcus Whitman sign a contract to keep them together at least until Spring if they were going to adopt the three they wanted. By Spring, Narcissa had bonded with the other girls, and wanted to keep them too. In July 1845 Marcus obtained a court order giving him legal custody of all seven children.

Francis Sager soon decided to run away and join the settlers in the nearby valley because the Whitmans were strict disciplinarians, and he didn't like living with them. Others who lived with the Whitmans including Joe Lewis who later participated in the attack against them also left complaining of ill treatment.

The Cayuse were considerably more susceptible to the diseases the settlers brought with them. In the fall of 1847 measles carried west with an emigrant train swept through the Cayuse villages. In the cold and damp weather of November 1847 the epidemic reached its peak and half the tribe died, including most of the children. Marcus Whitman and his wife treated both the white settlers and the Cayuse who came to them for medical attention, but the Cayuse had become increasingly wary of trusting the Whitmans for medical attention at this point. Henry Spalding, another missionary who worked closely with Whitman, and was with him the day before he died, claimed that Catholic priests were spreading rumors among the Cayuse people that Whitman was deliberately spreading diseases to them. He also testified on behalf of the five Cayuse men who were eventually hanged for Whitman's death at their trial, saying that the Cayuse had warned Whitman that the consequences for being a fake healer were death, and that they would have to kill him if he remained there, but he had chosen to disregard their warning.

Catherine Sager also recorded a fight between a man she said was named Tam-a-Has and Marcus Whitman in which Tam-a-Has struck Whitman with a wooden club and Whitman struck Tam-a-Has with a metal rod.

In November 1847, a Cayuse man named Stickas warned Marcus Whitman that Joe Lewis was convincing many of the Cayuse people that Whitman was actively poisoning them. Catherine Sager also believed that a French man named Joseph Stanfield who was an assistant to Doctor Whitman participated in spreading these stories, and that Joe Lewis and Joseph Stanfield motive for doing this was that they were conspiring to plunder the mission of the considerable resources that had been donated to it by then. On November 29, 1847, Joe Lewis along with a group of Cayuse men attacked the settlement at Waiilatpu. While the men who had been working outside were being attacked, Narcissa Whitman took frequent quick looks out the door, and according to Catherine Sager, "At such times she would exclaim: 'Oh, that Jo Lewis is doing it all!'". Catherine Sager also recorded witnessing Joe Lewis dragging the children at the mission out of hiding to be lined up and shot, and the Cayuse chief deciding to spare them instead, with that chief giving a speech again that night in favor of sparing the lives of the women and children. She described most of the deaths she witnessed as having been done by bullets without identifying who shot those bullets, she said she saw a teacher named Luke Saunders taken captive at knife point by two Cayuse men, and said she said that she looked away right before they killed him, but she also says Narcissa Whitman told her that she was mistaken about her belief about who killed Luke Saunders. The only death that Narcissa attributed to the Cayuse warriors rather than Joe Lewis while she was watching it unfold was Marcus Whitman's. Catherine Sager said that she was told more about the killings during the month she was kept as a prisoner after the attack. She again described almost all of the deaths in the passive voice as having been done with bullets, but says that the Cayuse warriors killed Marcus Whitman with traditional weapons, and that "an Indian" shot one other man. Afterwards, the Oregon Territorial government declared war on the Cayuse people, killing many of them, including according to the leaders of the Cayuse tribe at the time they made peace with the Oregon government, all of the men who had participated in this attack. Nevertheless, the Oregon Territorial government demanded that they turn over five more warriors to be tried and hanged for the attack. Those five warriors repeated at trial that everyone who had been involved in the attack had died in the war, and consistent with Catherine Sage's account specifically only attributed Marcus Whitman's death to their people, and said that he had been killed because their tribal law required bad medicine men to be put to death. John McLoughin (who was also a doctor and considered to be the founder of Oregon City), testified on behalf of those five men at their trial, and said he had repeatedly warned Whitman to quit practicing medicine among the Cayuse because they customarily executed their own healers if they did not have the healing powers they claimed to have. The judge (Orville Pratt) instructed the jury to treat the fact that the Cayuse had turned these five men over for Whitman's death as an admission of guilt, and the jury found them guilty; but the populace of the Oregon Territory considered them sufficiently believable and sympathetic that the recently elected first governor of the territory, Joseph Lane, who had arranged this trial as one of his first acts in office, resigned over the controversy, and his replacement, Kintzing Prichette, vowed to pardon them. However, Orville Pratt scheduled their execution for before Prichette obtained the ability to act on this vow, and overruled U.S. Marshall Joseph Meek's attempt to delay the hanging given the pending pardon. Elizabeth Sager testified at the trial, but she only testified that she had seen one of them attempt to throw down Luke Saunders, in the same incident that Catherine wrote about looking away from while Luke Saunders was still alive.

Eleven people at the mission died from the attack and had their bodies found, including Marcus, Narcissa, John Sager, and Francis Sager, who was there that day to bring up a cow from the valley for them to slaughter for meat. Three other men from the mission were not seen afterwards; and are sometimes counted as having died during the attack. Fifty-four women and children were captured and held for ransom, including the daughters of Joseph Meek and Jim Bridger and all the Sager girls. Several of the prisoners died in captivity, mostly from the same measles epidemic that was ravaging the Cayuse, including Louisa Sager who died on Dec. 5, 1847, at the age of six, and Helen Mar Meek who had been bedridden with measles on November 29. One month after the massacre, on December 29, 1847, Peter Skene Ogden from the Hudson's Bay Company arranged an exchange of sixty-two blankets, sixty-three cotton shirts, twelve rifles, six hundred loads of ammunition, seven pounds of tobacco, and twelve flints for the return of the forty-nine surviving prisoners. They were brought to Fort Vancouver.

== After the Whitman massacre ==
Catherine, Elizabeth, and Matilda Sager meet at the 50th anniversary commemoration of the Whitman massacre in November 1897.

The four remaining Sager orphans were brought to Oregon City. The girls were split up and grew up with different families.

- Catherine was placed with the Rev. William and Mrs. Roberts. In October 1851, she married Clark Pringle, a Methodist minister, at which time Elizabeth and Henrietta went to live with the Pringles. They had a farm of about 640 acres near Salem, Oregon, and raised eight children. About ten years after her arrival in Oregon she wrote an account of the Sager family's journey west. She hoped to earn enough money to set up an orphanage in memory of Narcissa Whitman, but never found a publisher. She died on August 10, 1910, at the age of 75. Her children and grandchildren saved her manuscript without modification, and today it is regarded as one of the most authentic accounts of the American westward migration.
- In 1855, Elizabeth married farmer William Fletcher Helm and had nine children. She lived in Prineville, Oregon. She died in Portland, Oregon, on July 19, 1925, at the age of 88.
- Matilda had five children by her first husband, who was a miner. After his death, she married Matthew Fultz, a farmer, by whom she had three more children. They lived in Siskiyou County, California. After the death of Fultz, she married a man named Delaney. She spent her later life with a daughter in California, where she died on April 13, 1928, at the age of 89.
- Henrietta was originally named Rosanna, but when the children went to live with the Whitmans, her name was changed to Henrietta Naomi in honor of her parents. She was placed first with the Morgan Kees family, where she remained three years, before joining her older sisters at the Pringles' farm. She then left to join her uncle Solomon Sager's traveling troupe of entertainers. Henrietta was married twice (unhappily) and died at the age of 26, having been mistakenly shot in a gunfight by someone aiming at her husband.

In 1897, more than 3,000 visitors attended the 50th anniversary commemoration of the massacre on the mission grounds. Invited as guests of honor were some of the survivors of the events of 1847, including Catherine Sager Pringle, Elizabeth Sager Helm, and Matilda Sager Delaney, the last surviving Sager orphans.

== In popular culture ==
The children's book On to Oregon! by Honoré Morrow is a fictionalized account of the Sager children.

The actors Harold Daye and Rickie Sorensen played John and Francis Sager in the 1958 episode, "Head of the House", of the syndicated anthology series, Death Valley Days, hosted by Stanley Andrews. In the story line, the Sager orphans head to the Whitman mission after the death of both parents. They are assisted along the way by the famous frontier scout Kit Carson (Morgan Jones) (1928–2012). Roy Barcroft played the wagon master, Captain Shaw.

The 1974 film Seven Alone starring Stewart Petersen documents the Sager family story.

The 1949 children's novel De Kinderkaravaan by An Rutgers van der Loeff was based on a misinterpreted newspaper article about the Sager children.

== Sources ==
- Catherine Sager Pringle, Across the Plains in 1844.
- National Park Service – Whitman Mission NHS, The True Story of the Sagers.
- Mary Trotter Kion, The Sagers go West.
- Erwin N. Thompson, Shallow Grave at Waiilatpu: The Sagers' West (1969).
- Ken Burns, The West, Transcript of the PBS documentary.
- Stewart Petersen, ‘’Seven Alone’’ (1974) film.
- Ronald Lansing, The Whitman Massacre Trial: 1850
- Raymond Rendleman, Who were the Cayuse Five, hanged in Oregon City in 1850?
