= John Bleifer =

American actor (1901–1992)

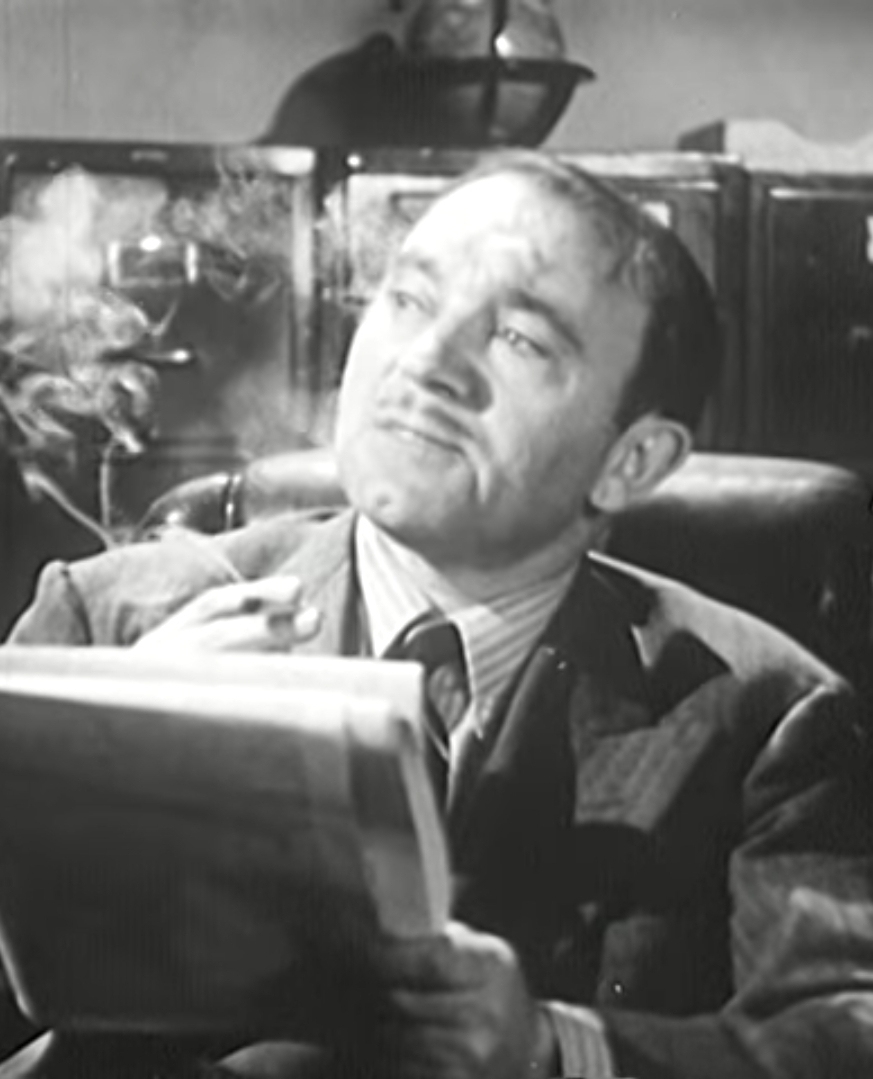
- Bleifer in Waterfront (1944)
- Born: John Melvin Bleifer; July 26, 1901; Zawiercie, Russian Empire (now Poland)
- Died: January 24, 1992 (aged 90); Los Angeles County, California, U.S.
- Resting place: Hillside Memorial Park Cemetery
- Occupation: Actor
- Years active: 1927–1986
- Spouse(s): Grace Klestick (birthdate 10 Dec 1892; m. 19??; d 21 Feb 1989)

John Melvin Bleifer (July 26, 1901 – January 24, 1992) was an American actor whose career began at the end of the silent film era, and lasted through the mid-1980s. He appeared in feature films and film serials, and in a number of television series and miniseries. Bleifer also acted on stage, and appeared in several Broadway productions.

== Life and career ==
Over the course of his career, he would appear in well over 100 films, serials, television shows and Broadway plays. His European accent allowed him to play several different nationalities, while using essentially the same accent. Bleifer did not make many silent films, but his career took off in 1933, after the advent of sound pictures.

The 1940s saw Bleifer's career continue on the same path he had taken in the prior decade. He had numerous small roles, many nameless and un-credited, as in: Archie Mayo's 1940 version of Four Sons, starring Don Ameche; the war film Paris Calling (1942), starring Basil Rathbone, Randolph Scott, and Elisabeth Bergner; the comedy They Got Me Covered (1943), starring Bob Hope and Dorothy Lamour; Mr. Lucky, starring Cary Grant and Laraine Day; the classic For Whom the Bell Tolls, starring Gary Cooper and Ingrid Bergman; and the 1946 comedy Without Reservations, starring John Wayne and Claudette Colbert. He also had several featured roles, such as: Pedro in the classic 1940 swashbuckler, The Mark of Zorro, starring Tyrone Power; as Oscar Zimmerman in the spy drama Waterfront, starring J. Carrol Naish and John Carradine; and as Franz Leiber in The Bowery Boys comedy, Smugglers' Cove (1948). During this decade Bleifer appeared in several film serials, including Perils of Nyoka (1942), and Secret Service in Darkest Africa (1943),

During the 1950s Bleifer's film career slowed down, as he became more involved with the new medium of television. He only had a few featured roles in film, such as in: Lew Landers' State Penitentiary (1950), starring Warner Baxter, where Bleifer had the role of Jailbreak Jimmy; and in the role of Jake Haberman in the 1957 police drama, Chain of Evidence. He continued to appear in smaller roles in a number of features, including: the 1951 Humphrey Bogart film noir, Sirocco; 1953's The Juggler, starring Kirk Douglas and directed by Edward Dmytryk, for which The New York Times praised Bleifer's performance; the 1955 musical Kismet, starring Howard Keel and Ann Blyth; the 1955 Bowery Boys comedy, Spy Chasers; the 1957 musical Silk Stockings, starring Fred Astaire and Cyd Charisse; and Edward Dmytryk's 1959 remake of The Blue Angel. In the 1950s Bleifer appeared in numerous television shows, such as Dangerous Assignment (1952), Navy Log (1956), I Love Lucy (1956), The Count of Monte Cristo (1956), The Adventures of Jim Bowie (1956), Shirley Temple's Storybook (1958), Perry Mason (1958), Peter Gunn (1959), and Rawhide (1959).

Bleifer continued working through the 1960s, 1970s, and into the 1980s. He made numerous television appearances on shows such as Death Valley Days (1960), The Lawless Years (1961), The Untouchables (1961), Dr. Kildare (1962–3), The Man from U.N.C.L.E. (1966), Marcus Welby, M.D. (1969), Adam-12 (1971), Kolchak: The Night Stalker (1974), S.W.A.T. (1975), Police Woman (1976), Little House on the Prairie (1979), The White Shadow (1979), and Highway to Heaven (1984). Bleifer also appeared in the television miniseries QB VII, in the role of Ben-Dan. While his activity in films decreased, he did continue in the medium, with roles in such films as: the tobacconist in the 1962 comedy If a Man Answers, starring Bobby Darrin and Sandra Dee; the Steward in The Hook, starring Kirk Douglas; a small role in W.C. Fields and Me (1976), starring Rod Steiger and Valerie Perrine; as Mishka in F.I.S.T. (1978), starring Sylvester Stallone, Rod Steiger, and Peter Boyle; and as one of the Rabbis in the Robert Aldrich comedy, The Frisco Kid, starring Gene Wilder and Harrison Ford. Bleifer's final performance was in the featured role of Hyman in 1986's Inside Out, starring Elliott Gould. Bleifer died on January 24, 1992, in Los Angeles County, California, and was interred in the Hillside Memorial Park, in Culver City, California, next to his wife, Grace, who had died three years previously, in 1989.

== Filmography ==
(Per AFI database)

- Surrender! (1927) (uncredited)
- We Americans (1928) (as Jake Bleifer)
- Blood Money (1933)
- Captured! (1933)
- The Bowery (1933)
- Clear All Wires! (1933) (as John Melvin Bleifer)
- Manhattan Melodrama (1934) (as John M. Bleifer)
- Hell in the Heavens (1934) (as John M. Bleifer)
- Night Alarm (1934)
- The Line-Up (1934) (as John M. Bleifer)
- Black Fury (1935) (as John M. Bleifer)
- Les Misérables (1935)
- The Black Room (1935) (as John M. Bleifer)
- The Crimson Trail (1935)
- Sutter's Gold (1936)
- 15 Maiden Lane (1936)
- The Road to Glory (1936)
- Ladies in Love (1936)
- 36 Hours to Kill (1936)
- Slave Ship (1937)
- Thank You, Mr. Moto (1937)
- Thin Ice (1937)
- Seventh Heaven (1937)
- Love Under Fire (1937)
- Charlie Chan at Monte Carlo (1938)
- Ride a Crooked Mile (1938)
- The Baroness and the Butler (1938)
- Sharpshooters (1938)
- Mr. Moto Takes a Vacation (1939)
- Full Confession (1939)
- Pacific Liner (1939)
- Pack Up Your Troubles (1939)
- Frontier Marshal (1939)
- Boy Friend (1939)
- Everything Happens at Night (1939)
- Girl from God's Country (1940)
- The Mark of Zorro (1940) as Pedro
- Four Sons (1940)
- Mr. District Attorney in the Carter Case (1941)
- The Monster and the Girl (1941)
- Berlin Correspondent (1942)
- Blue, White and Perfect (1942)
- Eagle Squadron (1942)
- Lure of the Islands (1942)
- Paris Calling (1942)
- For Whom the Bell Tolls (1943)
- Headin' for God's Country (1943)
- Mr. Lucky (1943)
- The Moon Is Down (1943)
- Night Plane from Chungking (1943)
- They Got Me Covered (1943)
- Background to Danger (1943)
- In Our Time (1944)
- Dragon Seed (1944)
- The Conspirators (1944)
- The Mask of Dimitrios (1944)
- Waterfront (1944)
- Tonight and Every Night (1945)
- Rendezvous 24 (1946)
- The Wife of Monte Cristo (1946)
- Without Reservations (1946)
- Fall Guy (1947)
- High Conquest (1947)
- Northwest Outpost (1947)
- The Enchanted Valley (1948)
- French Leave (1948)
- 16 Fathoms Deep (1948)
- Smugglers' Cove (1948)
- Call Northside 777 (1948)
- Bride of Vengeance (1949)
- Come to the Stable (1949)
- The Jackpot (1950)
- The Killer That Stalked New York (1950)
- The Petty Girl (1950)
- State Penitentiary (1950)
- Bowery Battalion (1951)
- Sirocco (1951)
- Aladdin and His Lamp (1952)
- Red Snow (1952)
- The Juggler (1953)
- White Lightning (1953)
- Spy Chasers (1955)
- Kismet (1955)
- Crashing Las Vegas (1956)
- Fighting Trouble (1956)
- World Without End (1956)
- The 27th Day (1957)
- Silk Stockings (1957)
- Chain of Evidence (1957)
- Footsteps in the Night (1957)
- The Blue Angel (1959)
- The Gene Krupa Story (1960)
- Ice Palace (1960)
- The George Raft Story (1961)
- If a Man Answers (1962)
- The Hook (1963)
- The Loved One (1965)
- Torn Curtain (1966) as Danish Waiter at Hotel D'Angleterre (uncredited)
- Heavy Traffic (1973)
- W.C. Fields and Me (1976)
- F.I.S.T. (1978) as Mishka
- The Frisco Kid (1979) as First Rabbi
- Inside Out (1986)
