= Laguna Heat =

1987 American drama film starring Harry Hamlin

- Genre: Drama; Thriller
- Based on: Laguna Heat by T. Jefferson Parker
- Screenplay by: D.M. Eyre; Pete Hamill; David Burton Morris
- Directed by: Simon Langton
- Starring: Harry Hamlin; Jason Robards; Rip Torn; Catherine Hicks; Anne Francis; James Gammon
- Theme music composer: Patrick Williams
- Country of origin: United States
- Original language: English

Production
- Executive producer: Jay Weston
- Producer: Bill Badalato
- Cinematography: Fred Murphy
- Editor: Bernard Gribble
- Running time: 110 minutes
- Production company: HBO Pictures

Original release
- Network: HBO
- Release: November 15, 1987

Laguna Heat is a 1987 American drama film directed by Simon Langton and written by D.M. Eyre, Pete Hamill and David Burton Morris. The film stars Harry Hamlin, Jason Robards, Rip Torn, Catherine Hicks, Anne Francis and James Gammon. The film premiered on HBO on November 15, 1987.

== Cast ==
- Harry Hamlin as Tom Shephard
- Jason Robards as Wade Shephard
- Rip Torn as Joe Datilla
- Catherine Hicks as Jane Algernon
- Anne Francis as Helene Long
- James Gammon as Grimes
- Jeff Kober as Victor "Vic" Harmon
- Dehl Berti as Azul Mercante
- Clyde Kusatsu as Coroner
- Rutanya Alda as Dr. Kroyden
- Gary Pagett as Pavliki
- Fred Ponzlov as Ricky Hyams
- Tom Pedi as Jimmy Hylkama
- Peggy Doyle as Dot Hylkama
- Peter Brocco as Judge Rubio
- Peter Jason as Chief Hanover
- David Komatz as Chauffeur
