= Calling Homicide =

1956 American film by Edward Bernds

- Poster for the film
- Directed by: Edward Bernds
- Written by: Edward Bernds
- Produced by: Ben Schwalb
- Starring: Bill Elliott; Don Haggerty; Kathleen Case
- Cinematography: Harry Neumann
- Edited by: William Austin
- Music by: Marlin Skiles
- Production company: Allied Artists Productions
- Release date: September 30, 1956 (US)
- Running time: 61 minutes
- Country: United States
- Language: English

Calling Homicide is a 1956 American crime drama film directed by Edward Bernds and starring Bill Elliott, Don Haggerty and Kathleen Case. The picture was the third of five films in the Lt. Andy Doyle series, all starring Elliott.

== Plot ==
When policeman Ted Allen is murdered by a car bomb, Lt. Andy Doyle of the sheriff's office investigates. On the victim he finds the name of a woman, Francine Norman, who is murdered shortly thereafter, strangled and mutilated. Doyle determines that there is a connection between the two deaths. Norman was a former actress who owned a modeling agency.

The murder victim was universally hated, and Doyle finds many suspects at the modeling agency: the current proprietor Darlene Adams, former screen actor Tony Fuller, business partner Alan Gilmore, and aspiring model Donna Graham. Additional persons of interest are movie stuntman turned builder Jim Haddix, and struggling screenwriter Peter Van Elda. Doyle uncovers that the agency was being used as a front for a blackmailing racket. However, all the evidence of the blackmail ring vanishes when the modeling school's files are destroyed by fire. Doyle finds and confronts the actual culprit, who confesses before dying himself.

== Cast ==
- Bill Elliott as Lt. Andy Doyle
- Don Haggerty as Sgt. Mike Duncan
- Kathleen Case as Donna Graham
- Myron Healey as Jim Haddix
- Jeanne Cooper as Darlene Adams
- Thomas B. Henry as Alan Gilmore
- Lyle Talbot as Tony Fuller
- Almira Sessions as Ida Dunstetter
- Herb Vigran as Ray Engel
- James Best as Arnie Arnholf
- John Dennis as Benny Bendowski
- Robert Bice as Phipps
- John Close as Deputy Warren
- Mel Welles as Valensi
- Dee Carroll as Rita
- Stanley Adams as Peter Van Elda
- Mary Treen as Flo Burton
- Jack Mulhall as Pierson
- William Meigs as Ted Allen
- Harry Strang as Deputy Wall

== See also ==
- Dial Red O (1955)
- Sudden Danger (1955)
- Chain of Evidence (1957)
- Footsteps in the Night (1957)
- List of American films of 1956

== Production ==
The working title of the film was House on Lookout Mountain. Production began in the first week of April 1956, and was completed before the end of the month. In July, the release date was announced as September 30, 1956. The National Legion of Decency gave the film a Class A Section II rating, indicating that it was morally unobjectionable but for adults only. In December, it was announced that Calling Homicide would be part of a two-film deal, along with Friendly Persuasion, booking first-run films directly into "second-run" theaters. It was the first such deal in the nation.

== Reception ==
William R. Weaver of Motion Picture Herald enjoyed Calling Homicide, rating it superior to similar police procedurals on television: "The intricate and unfamiliar story is by the practiced, proficient Edward Bernds, who also directed it. The picture moves swiftly and steadily from surprising start to convincing close. It's better melodrama than TV dishes up, and isn't interrupted by commercials. It's a faster 60 minutes than exhibitors find it easy to come by in these days of long-running primary features." The Exhibitor agreed that the film's short length made it useful for theater programming: "Another of those short mystery mellers featuring Bill Elliott as the detective-in-charge, this should serve as neat support to a heavier entry on the program."
