= Wild Stallion =

1952 film by Lewis D. Collins

- Theatrical film poster
- Directed by: Lewis D. Collins
- Written by: Daniel B. Ullman
- Produced by: Richard V. Heermance; Walter Mirisch
- Starring: Ben Johnson; Edgar Buchanan; Martha Hyer
- Cinematography: Harry Neumann
- Edited by: William Austin
- Music by: Marlin Skiles
- Production company: Monogram Pictures
- Distributed by: Monogram Pictures
- Release date: April 27, 1952
- Running time: 70 minutes
- Country: United States
- Language: English

Wild Stallion is a 1952 American Western film directed by Lewis D. Collins and starring Ben Johnson, Edgar Buchanan and Martha Hyer. The film's sets were designed by the art director Martin Obzina.

== Cast ==
- Ben Johnson as Dan Light
- Edgar Buchanan as John Wintergreen
- Martha Hyer as Caroline Cullen
- Hayden Rorke as Maj. Cullen
- Hugh Beaumont as Capt. Wilmurt
- Orley Lindgren as Young Dan Light
- Don Haggerty as Sgt. Keach
- Susan Odin as Caroline - as a child
- I. Stanford Jolley as Bill Cole
- Barbara Wooddell as Abigail Light
- John Halloran as John Light
- Don Garner as Cpl. Thompson
- John Hart as cavalry corporal
- Perc Launders as army doctor
- William Newell as Sergeant
- Bob Peoples as cavalryman
- Stanley Price as cavalry sentry
- Lee Roberts as Cavalry Corporal
- Elizabeth Russell as Dan's school teacher
