= Tina Carver =

American actress and model (1931–1985)

- Born: Bertenia June Brown; November 2, 1923; Salina, Kansas
- Died: February 18, 1982 (aged 58); Edmonds, Washington, U.S.
- Occupations: Actress; model
- Years active: 1954-1960
- Spouses: M. M. Dickason (m. 1940; div. 1945) Thomas H. Carver (m. 1947; div. 1956)
- Children: 3

Tina Carver, born Bertenia June Brown, (November 2, 1923 – February 18, 1982) was an American actress and model active in the 1950s and early 1960s. Born in Salina, Kansas, Carver lived in Little Rock, Arkansas and Houston, Texas during her growing up years. She trained as a pianist and worked in that capacity in Houston before becoming an actress. She studied drama at the University of Houston, and began her stage career in Europe in the early 1950s performing in theaters in Berlin and Paris. After performing in plays in Texas and California in 1953, she signed with Columbia Pictures in 1954. She made films with Columbia through 1957, and also worked in films with other Hollywood Studios in the mid 1950s. She also worked as an actress on American television from 1954-1961. In her later life she lived in Seattle, Washington where she worked as a realtor. She died at the age of 58 from complications of lung cancer at Stevens Memorial Hospital in Edmonds, Washington in 1982.

== Early life ==
The daughter of Herbert Weir Brown and Opha Estelle Cox, Tina Carver was born with the name Bertenia June Brown on November 2, 1923 in Salina, Kansas. By the time of the 1930 United States Federal Census she was living with her parents and siblings in Little Rock, Arkansas. She later moved with her family to Houston, Texas. Her first marriage was to a Mr. M. M. Dickason with whom she had two sons, Robert and Charles. That marriage ended in divorce in December 1945.

Tina originally trained to be a musician and worked as a pianist in Texas. In 1946 she was enrolled at the University of Houston and starred in a student production of Karel Čapek's R.U.R.; performing under the name Tina Dickason. It was reported in The Houston Chronicle in December 1947 that she was living in Germany and had recently married a second time to Tom Carver who was employed in the Allied Military Government of Occupied Territories in Berlin. They married in the autumn of 1947. The couple separated in November 1952 around the time their daughter Victoria was born, and later filed for divorced in October 1955. Their divorce was finalized in January 1956. At the time of their divorce Tom Carver was a professor at the Indiana University Maurer School of Law.

== Career ==
Carver began her acting career in Europe in the early 1950s, performing in theaters in Paris and Berlin. In Paris she starred in Meyer Levin's The Good Old Days in 1951 for the opening of the American Theatre. In 1953 she portrayed the vicar's wife, Penelope Toop, in Philip King's See How They Run at the Playhouse Theatre in Houston, and the part of nurse Ruth Kelly in Mary Chase's Harvey in a production in La Puente, California.

By June 1954 Carver was under contract with Columbia Pictures. For Columbia she starred as Joni Calvin in the film noir crime film Inside Detroit (1955), Gail Windsor in Uranium Boom (1956), as Mrs. Benko (Nick's wife) in the boxing movie The Harder They Fall (1956) and Big Marge in The Man Who Turned to Stone (1957). She had a minor role in the United Artists film A Bullet for Joey (1955). For Warner Bros. she portrayed Marie Holzapple in A Cry in the Night (1956) and Bessie in Hell on Frisco Bay (1956). She appeared in two films for Allied Artists Pictures: Dr. Terry Mason in the science-fiction horror film From Hell It Came (1957) and Claire Ramsey in the film noir Chain of Evidence (1957).

On television Carver guest starred in a 1954 episode of Big Town, and performed opposite Alan Ladd as his love interest in the episode "Committed" on General Electric Theater in December 1954; the latter of which was hosted by Ronald Reagan. She also starred opposite John Ireland in a 1954 episode of The Whistler. She starred in "The Quiet Wife" episode of The Pepsi-Cola Playhouse anthology in 1955. In 1956 she filmed the episode "After the Fact" with Keith Larsen and Robert Foulk for the anthology series The Web which aired in 1957. Her other television credits included guest appearances on Crossroads (1955), Colt .45 (1957), Perry Mason (1958, S1E21, "The Case of the Green-eyed Sister" as Sylvia Bain), The Thin Man (1958), The Millionaire (1958), Bronco (1959), Wichita Town (1959), Mr. Lucky (1960), Surfside 6 (1960), Shotgun Slade (1960, episode "The Golden Tunnel"), and Dante (1961, episode "Light Lady, Dark Room").

== Later life ==
In her later life Carver lived in Seattle, Washington where she worked as a realtor. She died at Stevens Memorial Hospital in Edmonds, Washington on February 18, 1982 from pneumonitis related to small-cell carcinoma. Her body was cremated and then transported to Texas for interment at Forest Park Lawndale Cemetery in Houston.

== Filmography ==
- A Bullet for Joey (1955) as Counter girl
- Inside Detroit (1955) as Joni Calvin
- A Cry in the Night (1956) as Marie Holzapple
- Uranium Boom (1956) as Gail Windsor
- The Harder They Fall (1956) as Mrs. Benko (Nick's wife)
- Hell on Frisco Bay (1956) as Bessie
- From Hell It Came (1957) as Dr. Terry Mason
- Chain of Evidence (1957) as Claire Ramsey
- The Man Who Turned to Stone (1957) as Big Marge
