= Waterfront (1944 film) =

1944 American film directed by Steve Sekely

- Directed by: Steve Sekely
- Written by: Martin Mooney (story and screenplay); Irwin Franklyn (screenplay)
- Produced by: Arthur Alexander; Alfred Stern
- Starring: See below
- Cinematography: Robert E. Cline
- Edited by: Charles Henkel Jr.
- Music by: Lee Zahler
- Distributed by: Producers Releasing Corporation
- Release date: June 10, 1944
- Running time: 68 minutes
- Country: United States
- Language: English

Waterfront is a 1944 American film from PRC Pictures directed by Steve Sekely.

== Plot ==
In San Francisco during World War II, Dr. Carl Decker (J. Carrol Naish) is a local Nazi spy leader undercover as an optometrist. While he is walking on the San Francisco waterfront at night, his decoder book and list of West Coast spies are stolen by the waterfront thug, Adolph Mertz. Victor Marlow comes to town, contacts Decker for his next assignment but the message he has is undecipherable without the book. It is a race to recover the book by two opposing teams: Decker and Marlow, and Zimmerman and Kramer; and a race to find a serial murderer.

== Cast ==
- John Carradine as Victor Marlow
- J. Carrol Naish as Dr. Carl Decker
- Maris Wrixon as Freda Hauser, daughter
- Edwin Maxwell as Max Kramer
- Terry Frost as Jerry Donovan, Freda's boyfriend)
- John Bleifer as Oscar Zimmerman, owner—Anchor Cafe
- Marten Lamont as Mike Gorman
- Olga Fabian as Mrs Emma Hauser as rooming house operator
- Claire Rochelle as Maisie
- Billy Nelson as Butch
- as Adolph Mertz, waterfront thug
