= The Harder They Fall (1956 film) =

American boxing film noir by Mark Robson

- Theatrical release poster
- Directed by: Mark Robson
- Screenplay by: Philip Yordan
- Based on: The Harder They Fall (1947 novel) by Budd Schulberg
- Produced by: Philip Yordan
- Starring: Humphrey Bogart; Rod Steiger; Jan Sterling
- Cinematography: Burnett Guffey
- Edited by: Jerome Thoms
- Music by: Hugo Friedhofer
- Production company: Columbia Pictures
- Distributed by: Columbia Pictures
- Release date: March 31, 1956
- Running time: 109 minutes
- Country: United States
- Language: English
- Box office: $1,350,000 (US)

The Harder They Fall is a 1956 American sports drama film noir directed by Mark Robson, produced and written by Philip Yordan. It stars Humphrey Bogart in his final film role, along with Rod Steiger and Jan Sterling, and features professional boxers Max Baer and Jersey Joe Walcott in supporting roles. The film is based on the 1947 novel by Budd Schulberg, which in turn was inspired by the Primo Carnera boxing scandal.

The film was nominated for the Palme d'Or at the 1956 Cannes Film Festival. The Harder They Fall was released by Columbia Pictures on March 31, 1956. At the 29th Academy Awards, the film was nominated for Best Cinematography, Black-and-White.

== Plot ==
Sportswriter Eddie Willis, broke after the newspaper he works for goes under, is hired as a PR man by boxing promoter Nick Benko. Nick has recruited Toro Moreno, a towering Argentine. Despite Toro's lack of fighting ability, Nick plans to use his size as a gimmick to draw fans to his fights. Unbeknownst to Toro and his manager, Luís Agrandi, all of his fights are fixed to make the public believe that he is a talented boxer.

Eddie feels misgivings about the scheme, but the lure of a huge payday is enough to make him ignore the venture's dishonesty. He is able to spin Toro as a legitimate up-and-comer even when his first fight goes so disastrously wrong that the boxing commission threatens to open an investigation.

As Benko's entourage crosses the country in a bus bedecked with advertising for the fighter, Toro gradually becomes a ranked contender. Throughout the tour, Eddie handles negotiations with other boxing managers to ensure Toro's fights remain fixed.

Toro fights Gus Dundee, whose previous fight with champion Buddy Brannen has left him with a broken neck. After the Toro fight, Dundee collapses and dies. Toro is overcome with guilt, thinking he killed Dundee, and wishes to return to Argentina. In a last-ditch attempt to protect the upcoming bout with Brannen, Eddie tells Toro the truth: that Brannen was responsible for Dundee's condition, that Toro is no fighter, and that all his fights have been fixed.

During the Brannen fight, Toro sustains a brutal beating. Afterward, Eddie learns that Benko has sold Toro's contract to another manager. While Eddie gets his promised payout of $26,000, Benko has rigged the accounting so Toro earns only $49.07 out of over $1 million in ticket revenue. Ashamed of his part in the farce and not wanting to see Toro exploited any further, Eddie gives Toro the $26,000 and puts him on a plane to Argentina before Benko's men can stop them.

Though Benko threatens to harm Eddie, Eddie begins writing an exposé about the corruption.

== Cast ==
- Humphrey Bogart as Eddie Willis
- Rod Steiger as Nick Benko
- Jan Sterling as Beth Willis
- Mike Lane as Toro Moreno
- Max Baer as Buddy Brannen
- Jersey Joe Walcott as George
- Edward Andrews as Jim Weyerhause
- Harold J. Stone as Art Leavitt
- Carlos Montalbán as Luís Agrandi
- Nehemiah Persoff as Leo
- Felice Orlandi as Vince Fawcett
- Herbie Faye as Max
- Rusty Lane as Danny McKeogh
- Jack Albertson as Pop
- Tina Carver as Nick's wife
- Abel Fernandez as Chief Firebird (uncredited)

== Production ==
Budd Schulberg's novel was published in 1947 and became a best seller. Film rights were bought by RKO Pictures, who paid Schulberg to write the screenplay. Joseph Cotten was to star.

Filming was delayed. In 1950, Alfred Hayes was writing the script and RKO announced the film would be shot under the production unit run by Jerry Wald and Norman Krasna however no film resulted.

Wald left RKO to join Columbia Pictures. In March 1955, Columbia announced that they bought the project from RKO as a vehicle for Humphrey Bogart. Wald said he was inspired by the fact the novel kept appearing on popular books at the library. Wald had 20% of the film, although he is not credited on it as producer.

According to Schulberg, "Columbia asked me to write the screenplay, but they insisted that I come to Hollywood because Harry Cohn likes to look at the script every two or three days. That’s just what I wanted to avoid. So I turned it down. For some reason, they couldn’t understand my attitude.”

The script was written by Philip Yordan who recalled "Steiger's part was the picture. Bogart had a contract with Columbia, so he had to do the picture, and he had no role. He raised hell and gave me a bad time. He behaved very badly on the picture because it wasn't his picture.... He was [supposed to be playing] a weak man that sold out. He didn't want to play that."

Yordan said he wanted Victor Mature to play the prize fighter but Robson wanted a real fighter, cast Mike Lane "and he ruined the picture. Guy couldn't act! I said, "Mark, I don't feel anything with this guy. The picture's cold." But Mark was only interested in social content."

Filming started October 1955. In early 1956, Bogart was diagnosed with esophageal cancer, and he died on January 14, 1957. Steiger recalled the actor's professionalism during production, even while coping with the disease:

"Bogey and I got on very well. Unlike some other stars, when they had closeups, you might have been relegated to a two-shot, or cut out altogether. Bogey didn't play those games. He was a professional and had tremendous authority. He'd come in exactly at 9am and leave at precisely 6pm. I remember once walking to lunch in between takes and seeing Bogey on the lot. I shouldn't have because his work was finished for the day. I asked him why he was still on the lot, and he said, 'They want to shoot some retakes of my closeups because my eyes are too watery'. A little while later, after the film, somebody came up to me with word of Bogey's death. Then it struck me. His eyes were watery because he was in pain with the cancer. I thought: 'How dumb can you be, Rodney'!"

The film was released with two different endings: one where Eddie Willis (inspired by sports writer Harold Conrad, according to Conrad) demanded that boxing be banned altogether, and the other where he merely insisted that there be a federal investigation into boxing. The video version contains the "harder" ending, while most television prints end with the "softer" message. Occasionally inaudible in a take, some of Bogart's lines as Willis are reported to have been dubbed in post-production by Paul Frees.

== Reception ==
=== Critical response ===
The film premiered at the 1956 Cannes Film Festival. The New York Times film critic Bosley Crowther liked the film, writing "It's a brutal and disagreeable story, probably a little far-fetched, and without Mr. Schulberg's warmest character [in the original novel]—the wistful widow who bestowed her favors on busted pugs. But with all the arcana of the fight game that Mr. Yordan and Mr. Robson have put into it—along with their bruising, brutish fight scenes—it makes for a lively, stinging film."

Variety said the film is "sufficiently well done, is such rousing fare, that it still rates as a strong drawing card despite the sanguine sightseeing."

Dennis Schwartz wrote, "The unwell Bogie's last film is not a knockout, but his hard-hitting performance is terrific as a has-been sports journalist out of desperation taking a job as a publicist for a fight fixer in order to get a bank account ... The social conscience film is realistic, but fails to be shocking or for that matter convincing."

Budd Schulberg disliked the film saying the filmmakers failed “to do their homework” and produced a distorted picture of boxing. “I don’t think they really smelled or breathed the fight atmosphere of Eighth Avenue. They came to New York for eight days. How could they expect to make a picture Working out of the St. Regis Hotel?"

=== Box office ===
The film was a box office disappointment. Jerry Wald later said he made a "mistake with" the film and it "taught me that the girl who takes her boy to the theatres doesn’t want violence. She wants emotion."

=== Lawsuits ===
Primo Carnera sued Columbia for $1.5 million in damages, alleging that the film was based on him and invaded his privacy. The lawsuit was not successful. Boxer Joe Greb also sued for invasion of privacy.

== See also ==
- List of American films of 1956
- List of boxing films
