= John Wengraf =

Austrian actor (1897–1974)

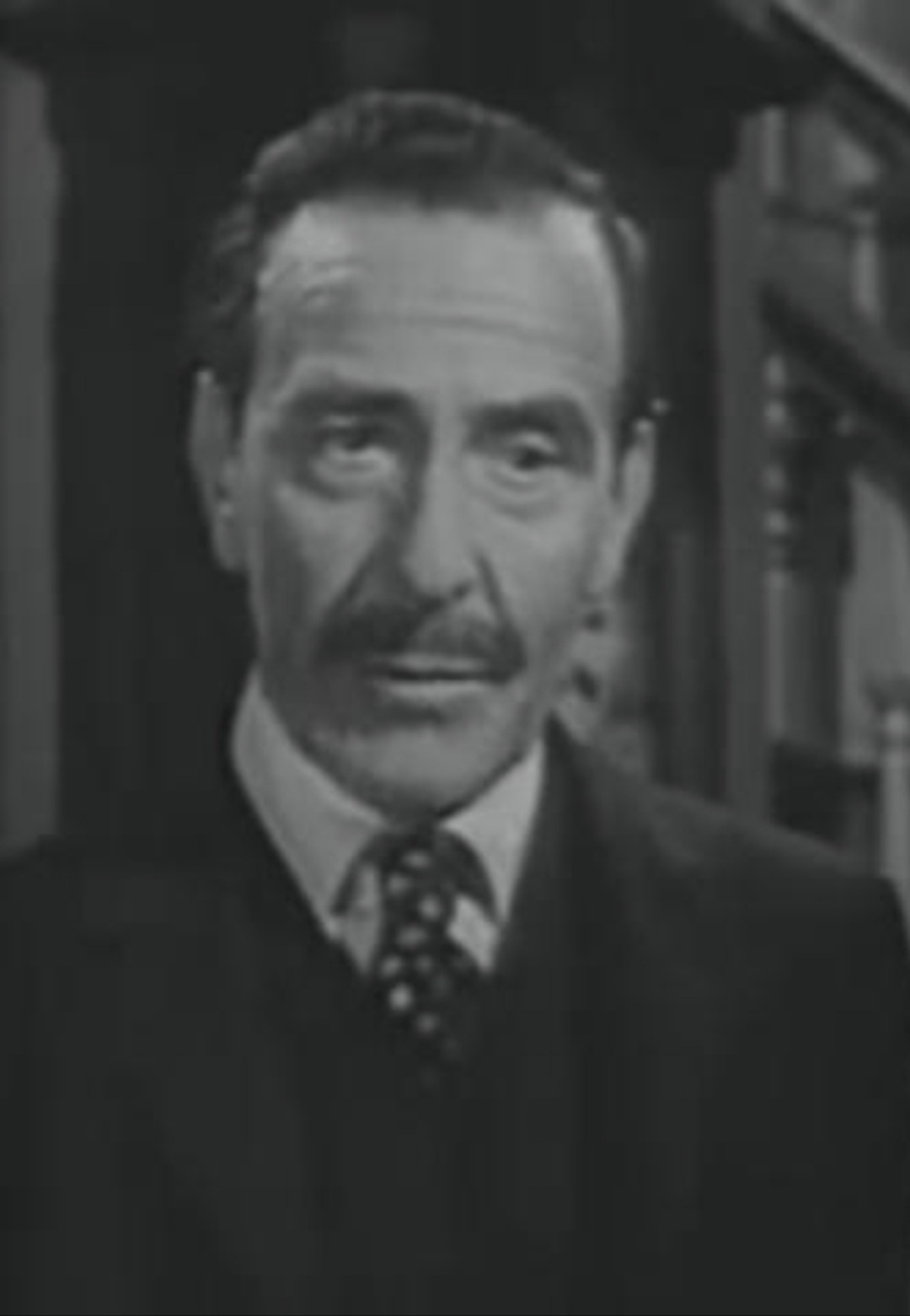
- Wengraf on the One Step Beyond, episode "The Explorer" (1960)
- Born: 23 April 1897; Vienna, Austria-Hungary
- Died: 4 May 1974 (aged 77); Santa Barbara, California, U.S.
- Occupation: Actor
- Years active: 1922–1966

John Wengraf (23 April 1897 – 4 May 1974) was an Austrian actor.

== Early years ==
Wengraf was born in Vienna, Austria-Hungary.

== Career ==
Wengraf became a matinee idol in the 1930s, and was director of the Vienna State Theatre. He emigrated to Britain in 1939 as the Nazis began their rise to power in Austria. While in London, he was involved with more than 100 plays as either director or actor.

Wengraf appeared unbilled in a couple of films, as well as in some of the first BBC live-television shows ever presented. In 1941 he appeared on Broadway with Helen Hayes in Candle in the Wind and decided to stay in the US. His other Broadway credits included The Traitor (1949) and The French Touch (1945). The following year he settled in the Los Angeles area.

He found himself invariably playing the very characters he detested. Some of his more nefarious nasties surfaced in such films as the Humphrey Bogart classic Sahara (1943), as well as The Boy from Stalingrad (1943), U-Boat Prisoner (1944) and Till We Meet Again (1944).

In post-war years, he portrayed ethnic professionals (scientists, doctors, professors, foreign royalty). His films included Tomorrow Is Forever (1946); he portrayed Count Von Papen in 5 Fingers (1952); and Ronchin in the Ethel Merman musical Call Me Madam (1953). In the 1950s and 1960s he transferred his talents to TV, appearing on a number of dramatic showcases and on such popular programs as The Untouchables (1959), Hawaiian Eye (1959), The Man from U.N.C.L.E. (1964) and The Time Tunnel (1966). His last few films included minor roles in the war-themed Judgment at Nuremberg (1961), Hitler (1962) and Ship of Fools (1965) as well as The Prize (1963).

== Death ==
Wengraf retired in 1966, and died in Santa Barbara, California, at the age of 77 on 4 May 1974.

== Selected filmography ==
- Homo sum (1922)
- Frau Tod (1922)
- Die Menschen nennen es Liebe... (1922)
- Bretter, die die Welt bedeuten (1935) - Paul Rainer
- Convoy (1940) - Commander Deutschland
- Night Train to Munich (1940) - Concentration Camp Physician (uncredited)
- Sailors Three (1940) - German Captain
- Lucky Jordan (1942) - Herr Kesselman
- Mission to Moscow (1943) - Polish Ambassador Grzybowski (uncredited)
- The Boy from Stalingrad (1943) - German Major
- Sahara (1943) - Maj. Von Falken
- Paris After Dark (1943) - Dr. Mannheim (uncredited)
- Song of Russia (1944) - Red Army Commander
- The Seventh Cross (1944) - Overkamp
- U-Boat Prisoner (1944) - Gunther Rudehoff, Gestapo Agent
- Till We Meet Again (1944) - Gestapo Chief (uncredited)
- Strange Affair (1944) - Rudolph Kruger
- The Thin Man Goes Home (1944) - Big Man (uncredited)
- Hotel Berlin (1945) - Wolf von Buelow (uncredited)
- Week-End at the Waldorf (1945) - Alex
- Tomorrow Is Forever (1946) - Dr. Ludwig
- The Razor's Edge (1946) - Joseph - Butler
- T-Men (1947) - 'Shiv' Triano
- Sofia (1948) - Peter Goltzen
- Sealed Verdict (1948) - German doctor
- Wake of the Red Witch (1948) - Prosecuting Attorney (uncredited)
- The Lovable Cheat (1949) - Pierquin
- Belle Le Grand (1951) - Andrew Sinclair (uncredited)
- 5 Fingers (1952) - Count Franz Von Papen
- Tropic Zone (1953) - Lukats
- Call Me Madam (1953) - Ronchin (uncredited)
- The Desert Rats (1953) - German Doctor (uncredited)
- Flight to Tangier (1953) - Kalferez
- The French Line (1953) - Commodore Renard
- Hell and High Water (1954) - Col. Schuman (uncredited)
- Paris Playboys (1954) - Vidal
- Gog (1954) - Dr. Zeitman
- The Gambler from Natchez (1954) - Nicholas Cadiz
- The Racers (1955) - Dr. Tabor
- Never Say Goodbye (1956) - Prof. Zimmelman
- Oh, Men! Oh, Women! (1957) - Dr. Krauss
- The Pride and the Passion (1957) - Sermaine
- Valerie (1957) - Mr. Horvat
- The Disembodied (1957) - Dr. Carl Metz
- The Walter Winchell File (1957, TV Series) - Leopold
- The Return of Dracula (1958) - John Meierman
- 12 to the Moon (1960) - Dr. Erich Heinrich
- Portrait in Black (1960) - Dr. Kessler
- Judgment at Nuremberg (1961) - Dr. Karl Wieck
- Hitler (1962) - Dr. Morell
- The Prize (1963) - Hans Eckhart
- Ship of Fools (1965) - Graf
