= The Boy from Stalingrad =

1943 film by Sidney Salkow

- Directed by: Sidney Salkow
- Screenplay by: Ferdinand Reyder
- Story by: Robert Arden; Robert Lee Johnson
- Produced by: Colbert Clark
- Cinematography: L. William O'Connell
- Edited by: Mel Thorsen
- Music by: Gregory Stone
- Production company: Columbia Pictures
- Distributed by: Columbia Pictures
- Release date: May 20, 1943
- Running time: 69 minutes
- Country: United States
- Language: English

The Boy from Stalingrad is a 1943 American war film directed by Sidney Salkow.

== Plot ==
Five Russian youngsters and an English boy form a guerilla band which harasses the Germans stationed in their village.

== Cast ==
- Bobby Samarzich as Kolya
- Conrad Binyon as Grisha
- Mary Lou Harrington as Nadya
- Scotty Beckett as Pavel
- Steven Muller as Tommy Hudson
- Donald Mayo as Yuri
- John Wengraf as German Major (as John E. Wengraf)
- Erik Rolf as German Captain

== Production ==
In 1942, it was announced by Columbia Pictures that the studio was working on a motion picture adapted from a story by Robert Arden, a radio political commentator. Filming took place from December 17, 1942 to January 14, 1943. At one point, actor William Marshall had been signed for a role in the film.

== Reception ==
Upon its release, the Christian Century spoke negatively of the film, writing: "If designed, as it would seem, for young audiences, a regrettable exploitation of hate and fear. Heavy-handed." Daily Variety was more positive, writing that "Lacking draw names to rate it above supporting material, picture nevertheless garbs its intense patriotism and will to fight with audience interest under able direction of Sidney Salkow", praising the children's performances as well as Clark's production, O'Connell's cinematography, music, set and art direction as helping depict the setting well.

== See also ==
- List of American films of 1943
