= Seven Alone =

1974 film directed by Earl Bellamy

- Directed by: Earl Bellamy
- Based on: On to Oregon by: Honoré Willsie Morrow; Edward Shenton (Illustrations)
- Production company: Audio Services Company
- Release date: 1974
- Running time: 89 minutes
- Country: USA
- Language: English
- Box office: $2.4 million

Seven Alone is a 1974 film directed by Earl Bellamy. It was based on a true story detailed in the book On to Oregon. It was shot in Wyoming.

== Premise ==
In the 1840s the Sager family treks from Missouri to Oregon. After the deaths of both parents, their seven children continue the journey alone.

== Cast ==
- Dewey Martin as Henry Sager
- Anne Collings as Naome Sager
- Aldo Ray as Dr. Dutch
- Dean Smith as Kit Carson
- James Griffith as Billy Shaw
- Stewart Petersen as John Sager
- Dehl Berti as White Elk
- Bea Morris as Sally Shaw
- Scott Petersen as Francis Sager
- Debbie van Orden as Catherine Sager
- Diane Petersen as Matilda Sager
- Suzanne Petersen as Louisa Sager
- Julie Petersen as Elizabeth Sager
- Christy Clark as Anna Sager
- Pat Wilde as Marcus Whitman
- Kliss Sparks as Narcissa Whitman
- Craig Larsen as Indian
- Roger Pancake as Adam Polk
- Anne David (as Ann David)
- Riley Morgan as Indian
- Anne Seymour as Narrator (adult Catherine)

== Release ==
=== Box office ===
The film made $2.4 million.

=== Critical ===
The Los Angeles Times stated that the film was "no artistic triumph".
