= Rachel Ames =

American actress (born 1929)

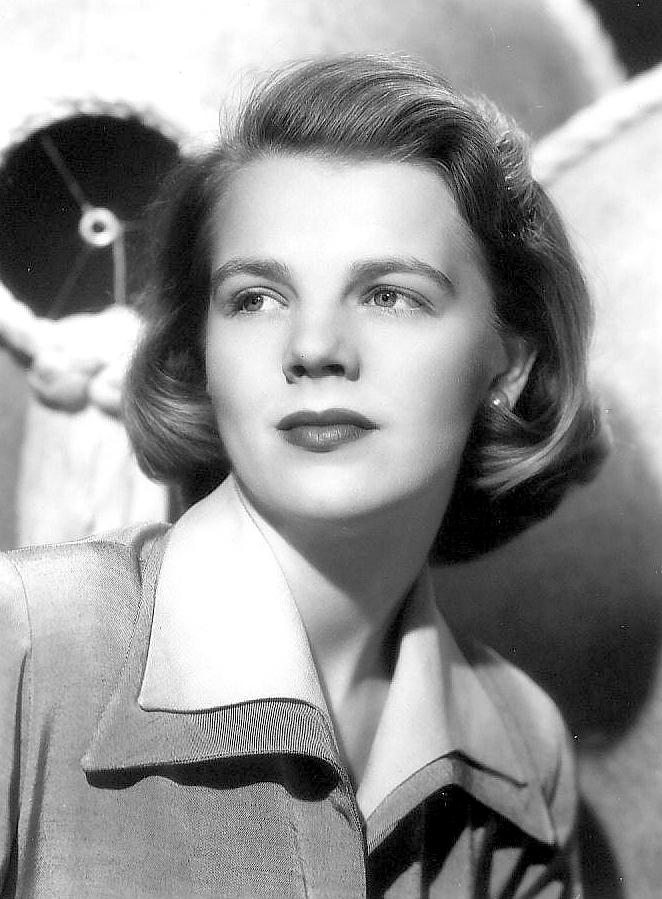
- Ames, c. 1950
- Born: Rachel Kay Foulger; November 2, 1929 (age 96); Portland, Oregon, U.S.
- Other name: Judith Ames
- Education: University of California, Los Angeles
- Occupation: Actress
- Years active: 1951–2007, 2009–2015
- Spouses: Jack Genung (m. 1952, divorced) Barry Cahill (m. 1968; died 2012)
- Children: 2
- Parents: Byron Foulger (father); Dorothy Adams (mother)

Rachel Ames (born Rachel Kay Foulger; November 2, 1929) is an American actress. She is known for playing the role of Audrey Hardy on the ABC Daytime soap opera General Hospital (1964 to 2007, returning for appearances in 2009, 2013, and 2015). At her last appearance on the show, Ames' GH role as Audrey was the longest-running and earliest appearing, spanning over 50 years and earning her three Daytime Emmy Award nominations. She received the Daytime Emmy Lifetime Achievement Award in 2004. Ames also played the role of Audrey on Port Charles, a spin off of General Hospital, from 1997 to 1998.

== Early life ==
Ames was born Rachel Kay Foulger on November 2, 1929, in Portland, Oregon. She is the daughter of actress (and later college drama instructor) Dorothy Adams and actor Byron Foulger. At the time of her birth, her father was employed as a director for the Portland Civic Theatre. She has one younger sister, born in 1942. Through her father, she is of English descent, the fourth generation of English immigrants from Norfolk, who settled in the Salt Lake City area.

Ames spent her early life in Portland, but her family relocated to California so her parents could work, perform and teach at the Pasadena Playhouse. She graduated from University High School and later enrolled at University of California, Los Angeles, where her mother was a professor in the university's drama department. Ames performed in theater productions during high school and college. She left UCLA after eighteen months when she was signed to a film contract with Paramount Pictures.

== Career ==
=== 1949-1954: Early work ===
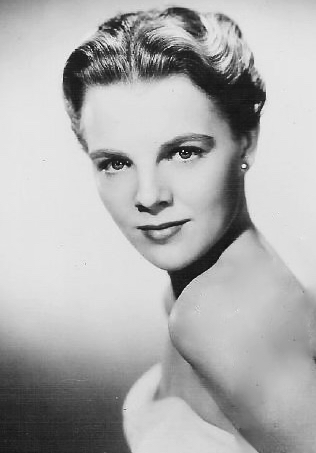
Rachel Ames 1954

In 1949, Ames made her professional acting debut in Pilgrimage Play. She co-starred with her parents in One Foot in Heaven at the Pasadena Playhouse. She also appeared in productions of Broadway Jones, The Circle, and King of Hearts at the same venue. She co-starred with her father on stage in Cradle Song. Ames' other theater credits include The Immortalist, Mary Rose, and Golden Boy.

She transitioned into film under the stage name Judith Ames. She was under contract with Paramount Pictures for three years in the early 1950s. Her first feature film was When Worlds Collide (1951), a science-fiction thriller based on the 1933 novel of the same name. She played the role of Julie Cummings. The same year, she appeared in Toast to Our Brother, a short film documenting fraternity life at UCLA, where she was a student at the time.

She had an uncredited role in the film noir The Turning Point (1952). She also had an uncredited role as Mrs. Kirk in the Western film Arrowhead (1953), co-starring with Charlton Heston. The following year, she had a supporting role as Betsy Williams in the Western comedy film Ricochet Romance (1954).

=== 1954-1964: Television ===
In the mid–1950s, Ames, began appearing on television (still using the stage name Judith Ames). From 1954 to 1957, she guest starred on The Public Defender, I Led 3 Lives, Science Fiction Theatre, The Millionaire, Alfred Hitchcock Presents, You Are There, Highway Patrol, Broken Arrow, The Loretta Young Show, Cavalcade of America, General Electric Theater, Tales of Wells Fargo, and The Californians. She made a brief return to film, playing Marion Erschick in the Western Oregon Passage (1957).

From 1958 to 1959, Ames guest starred on Telephone Time, Trackdown, Perry Mason, Man Without a Gun, Lassie, Dick Powell's Zane Grey Theatre, Wagon Train, Westinghouse Desilu Playhouse, Cimarron City, and Wanted Dead or Alive. In her only regular role on primetime television, Ames played Policewoman Sandy McAllister on The Lineup in the series' final season in 1959.

She played Alice Hainline in the Western film Gunfighters of Abilene (1960), co-starring with Buster Crabbe and Barton MacLane. Ames guest starred on Thriller, Laramie, Stagecoach West, Whispering Smith, 77 Sunset Strip, The Andy Griffith Show, The Fugitive, Arrest and Trial, and Ben Casey.

=== 1964-2015: General Hospital ===
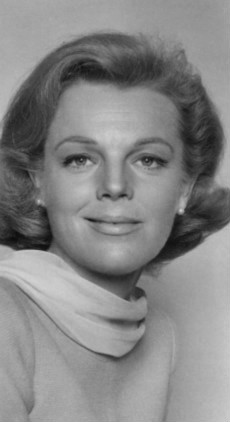
Ames as Audrey March in General Hospital, 1973

On February 23, 1964, Ames debuted on the ABC daytime soap opera General Hospital, playing Audrey Hardy (then known as Audrey March). Ames was initially put on contract for only thirteen weeks because Audrey was dying from lymphoma. Her performance was well received by the show's producers and the illness was eventually forgotten. Ames' tenure in the role became the longest running in the network's history, spanning five decades. The character, a registered nurse, was paired romantically with Dr. Steve Hardy (John Beradino). When Audrey and Steve were married, Ames' father, Byron Foulger, played the priest who performed the ceremony.

During her time on General Hospital, Ames had an uncredited role as Dr. Parkington's Nurse in the thriller film Daddy's Gone A-Hunting (1969), co-starring with her husband, Barry Cahill. The same year, she guest starred on Ironside and The Virginian.

In 1974, Ames was nominated for a Daytime Emmy Award for Outstanding Lead Actress in a Drama Series for her work on General Hospital. She was nominated again in the same category in 1975. In 1979, she was nominated for a Daytime Emmy Award for Outstanding Supporting Actress in a Drama Series.

In 1997, she appeared as Audrey Hardy on ABC's special two-hour primetime preview of a new daytime soap opera Port Charles, a spin-off of General Hospital. Ames had a recurring role as Audrey on Port Charles from 1997 to 1998.

Her contract was not renewed for General Hospital in 2003, but she still appeared as a recurring character. In 2004, Ames was honored with a Lifetime Achievement Award at the 31st Daytime Emmy Awards ceremony at Radio City Music Hall in New York City. In 2007, Ames retired from General Hospital after 43 years. She made a return appearance as Audrey on October 20, 2009, after a two-year absence from the show.

Ames returned to General Hospital for the show's 50th anniversary on March 29, 2013. She reprised the role of Audrey again for one episode on October 30, 2015.

== Personal life ==
Ames married Jack Genung on January 31, 1952, in Los Angeles. They had one daughter.

She married her second husband, Canadian-born actor Barry Cahill in June 1968. They had a daughter and two grandchildren. Cahill died in April 2012. They had been married for 43 years.

== Filmography ==
=== Film ===
Year	Title	Role	Notes
1951	When Worlds Collide	Julie Cummings	Credited as Judith Ames
1951	Toast to Our Brother		Short film Credited as Judith Ames
1952	The Turning Point	Girl	Uncredited
1953	Arrowhead	Mrs. Kirk	Uncredited
1954	Ricochet Romance	Betsy Williams	Credited as Judith Ames
1957	Oregon Passage	Marion Erschick	Credited as Judith Ames
1960	Gunfighters of Abilene	Alice Hainline	Credited as Judith Ames
1969	Daddy's Gone-A-Hunting	Dr. Parkington's Nurse	Uncredited

=== Television ===
Year	Title	Role	Notes
1954	Your Favorite Story	Lucy Kilgore	Episode: "The Crime" Credited as Judith Ames
1954	The Public Defender	Shirley Selvey	Episode: "The Do-Gooder" Credited as Judith Ames
1954	City Detective	June	Episode: "Her Sister's Keeper" Credited as Judith Ames
1954; 1955	I Led 3 Lives	Comrade Jeanette; Margaret	Episodes: "Love Story", "Second Courier" Credited as Judith Ames
1955	Soldiers of Fortune	Ellen Thayer	Episode: "The Black Scarab" Credited as Judith Ames
1955	The Pepsi-Cola Playhouse		Episode: "I'll Be Waiting" Credited as Judith Ames
1955–1957	Science Fiction Theatre	Various	6 episodes Credited as Judith Ames
1955; 1958	NBC Matinee Theater		Episodes: "The Shot", "Found Money" Credited as Judith Ames
1955; 1960	The Millionaire	Georgette French; Jessica March	Episodes: "The Cobb Marley Story", "Millionaire Jessica March" Credited as Judith Ames
1956	Alfred Hitchcock Presents	Laura	Episode: "The Hidden Thing" Credited as Judith Ames
1956	Dr. Christian	Julie	Episode: "Insurance Policy"
1956	You Are There	Mrs. Fowler	Episode: "V-J Day (September 2, 1945)" Credited as Judith Ames
1956	Highway Patrol	Anne Reynolds	Episode: "Scared Cop" Credited as Judith Ames
1956	Studio 57	Jenny; Janet	Episodes: "The Black Road", "Out of Sight" Credited as Judith Ames
1956	Broken Arrow	Terry Wilson	Episode: "The Mail Riders" Credited as Judith Ames
1956	The Loretta Young Show	Alice Fuller; Nurse Holste	Episodes: "The Years Between", "Three and Two, Please" Credited as Judith Ames
1956; 1957	Crossroads	Mrs. Edith Brissie; Marian	3 episodes
1956; 1959	State Trooper	Various	3 episodes
1957	Cavalcade of America	Carol	Episode: "The House of Empty Rooms" Credited as Judith Ames
1957	Whirlybirds	Eve Douglas	Episode: "Lynch Mob" Credited as Judith Ames
1957	General Electric Theater	Mary; Edie Duncan	Episodes: "No Skin Off Me", "Too Good with a Gun" Credited as Judith Ames
1957	Code 3	Maggie Porter	Episode: "The Bite" Credited as Judith Ames
1957; 1958	Tales of Wells Fargo	Ellen Craig; Maude Kimball	Episodes: "A Time to Kill", "Special Delivery" Credited as Judith Ames
1957; 1959	The Californians	Ann Sloan; Madge Dorsett	Episodes: "The Avenger", "A Turn in the Trail" Credited as Judith Ames
1958	Meet McGraw	Sue Walters	Episode: "Time for Dying" Credited as Judith Ames
1958	Telephone Time	Joan Yedor	Episode: "The Checkered Flag" Credited as Judith Ames
1958	Trackdown	Jenny Krail; Melinda Curry	Episodes: "The Farrand Story", "The House" Credited as Judith Ames
1958	M Squad	Greta Loder	Episode: "The Fight" Credited as Judith Ames
1958	Mickey Spillane's Mike Hammer	Mrs. Armstrong	Episode: "For Sale, Deathbed, Used" Credited as Judith Ames
1958	Perry Mason	Marian Shaw	Episode: "The Case of the Black-Eyed Blonde" Credited as Judith Ames
1958	Man Without a Gun		Episode: "The Last Bullet"
1958	The Silent Service	Jeanne McFarland	Episode: "The Sandshark Story" Credited as Judith Ames
1958	Lassie	Mrs. Bridell	Episode: "Lassie's Decision" Credited as Judith Ames
1958	Colgate Theatre	Alice Beekman	Episodes: "The Last Marshal", "If You Knew Tomorrow" Credited as Judith Ames
1958	Dick Powell's Zane Grey Theatre	Martha Bream; Ellen Larkin	Episodes: "The Stranger", "Homecoming" Credited as Judith Ames
1958–1960	The Life and Legend of Wyatt Earp	Various	3 episodes
1958–1964	Wagon Train	Various	5 episodes
1959	Westinghouse Desilu Playhouse	Muriel	Episode: "Trial at Devil's Canyon" Credited as Judith Ames
1959	Man with a Camera	Lila	Episode: "Mute Evidence" Credited as Judith Ames
1959	Cimarron City	Emily Barton	Episode: "The Unaccepted" Credited as Judith Ames
1959	Frontier Doctor	Nancy Turner	Episode: "The Big Gamblers" Credited as Judith Ames
1959	Wanted Dead or Alive	Ellie Morgan; Sarah Buchanan	Episodes: "The Corner", "Angels of Vengeance" Credited as Judith Ames
1959	Union Pacific	Sarah Morgan	Episode: "To the Death" Credited as Judith Ames
1959–1960	The Lineup	Sandy McAllister	Series regular, 15 episodes
1960	Thriller	Betty Follett	Episode: "The Mark of the Hand"
1960	Laramie	Helen Bentley; Mrs. LuBell	Episodes: "Cemetery Road", "A Sound of Bells"
1961	Stagecoach West	Cecilia Barnes	Episode: "The Root of Evil"
1961	Whispering Smith	Jodie Tyler	Episode: "The Jodie Tyler Story" Credited as Rachel Foulger
1962	G.E. True	Kate	Episode: "Circle of Death"
1963	77 Sunset Strip	Agnes Hoyt	Episode: "Reunion at Balboa"
1963	The Andy Griffith Show	Rosemary	Episode: "A Wife for Andy"
1963	The Bill Dana Show		Episode: "You Gotta Have Heart"
1963	The Fugitive	Ann Gerard	Episode: "Never Wave Goodbye: Part 1"
1964	Ben Casey	Ethel Beldon	Episode: "I'll Get on My Ice Floe and Wave Goodbye"
1964	Arrest and Trial	Mrs. Harmon	Episode: "Funny Man with a Monkey"
1964–2003; 2007, 2009, 2013, 2015	General Hospital	Audrey March Hardy	Contract role: 1964–2003, Recurring role and guest appearances: 2007–2015
1968	Off to See the Wizard	Nellie Malone	Episode: "Mike and the Mermaid"
1969	Ironside	Carolyn Channing	Episode: "Up, Down and Even"
1969	The Virginian	Mary Kinkaid	Episode: "Death Wait"
1969	This Is the Life		Episode: "Adrift"
1970	The Name of the Game	Mrs. Bailey	Episode: "The Glory Shouter"
1997–1998	Port Charles	Audrey March Hardy	Recurring role

== Awards and nominations ==
Year	Award	Category	Nominated work	Results	Ref.
1974	1st Daytime Emmy Awards	Daytime Emmy Award for Outstanding Lead Actress in a Drama Series	General Hospital	Nominated	
1975	2nd Daytime Emmy Awards	Daytime Emmy Award for Outstanding Lead Actress in a Drama Series	General Hospital	Nominated	
1979	6th Daytime Emmy Awards	Daytime Emmy Award for Outstanding Supporting Actress in a Drama Series	General Hospital	Nominated	
2004	31st Daytime Emmy Awards	Lifetime Achievement Award		Won	
