= Anna Rutgers van der Loeff =

Dutch writer

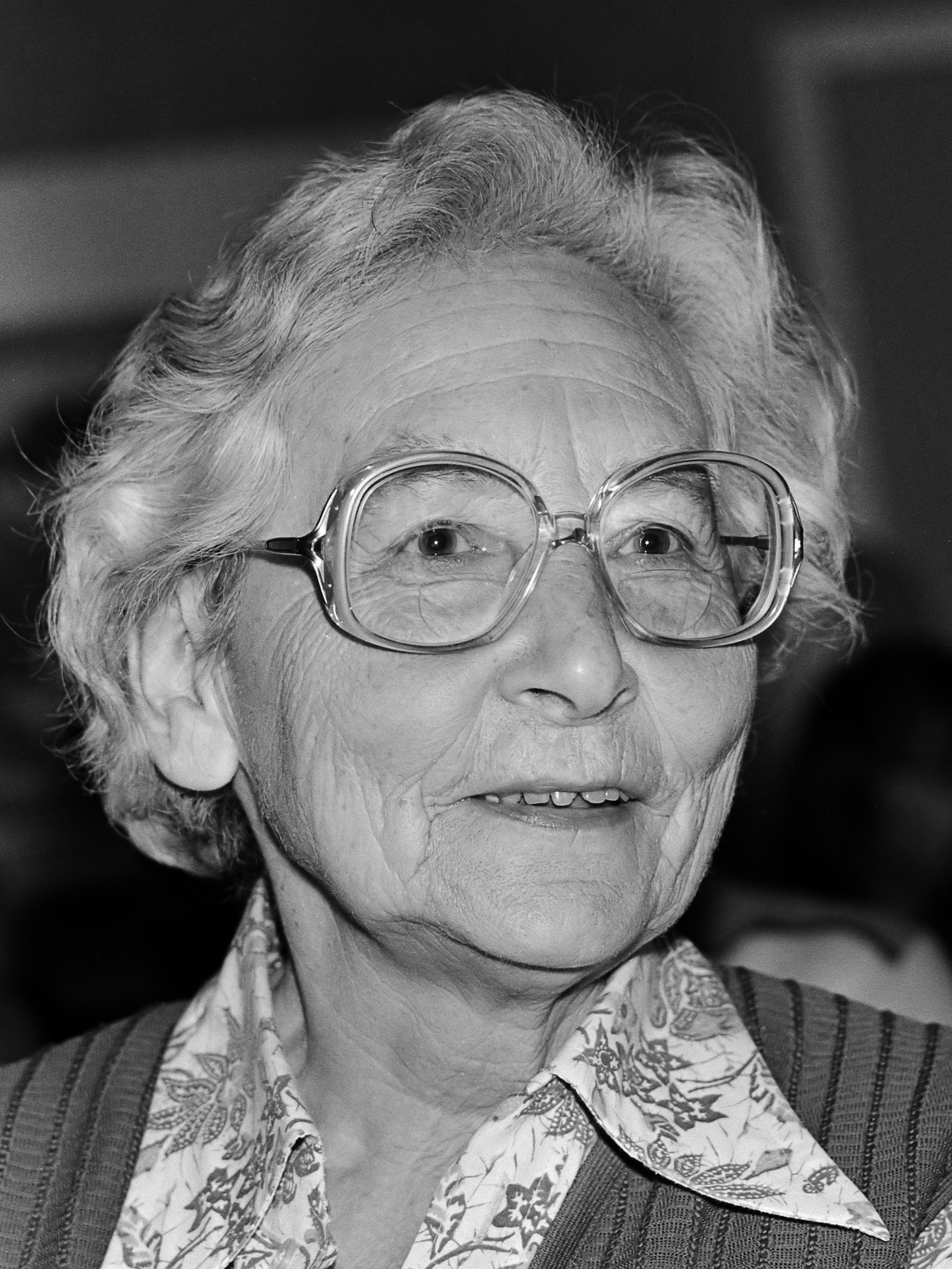
An Rutgers van der Loeff (1982)

Anna ("An") Rutgers van der Loeff-Basenau (March 15, 1910 – August 19, 1990) was a Dutch writer of children's novels.

== Biography ==
Van der Loeff was born in Amsterdam on March 15, 1910, the eldest daughter of bacteriologist Jacob Basenau and writer-translator Nora Goemans. She attended Barlaeus Gymnasium in Amsterdam, and went to study classical languages at the Municipal University of Amsterdam (now the University of Amsterdam). After her father's suicide in 1929, she gave up her studies to do translation work and teach with her mother. In 1934 she married her childhood friend and fellow student Michaël Rutgers van der Loeff, a member of the prominent van der Loeff family. The couple had two daughters and two sons.

In 1941 van der Loeff, together with her mother, published her first book Het oude huis en wij (The Old House and We), a biography of her mother. Her breakthrough came with De kinderkaravaan (published in English as Children on the Oregon Trail), a young adult novel published in 1949. She also had success with Lawines razen (Avalanche!) in 1954, of which a multi-part radio play was broadcast by the Dutch radio station NCRV. Possibly her most popular novel was the 1963 Children on the Oregon Trail (De Kinderkaravaan), an account of a family of children traveling with a pioneer caravan to Oregon in the mid-19th century, loosely based on the real incident of the Sager orphans. Another popular novel was Avalanche! (1958), a story of a group of children from an orphanage caught up in heavy snowfall in Switzerland.

Other works in English include (with publication date of English translation):

- They're drowning our Village (1959)
- Rossie (1964)
- Vassilis on the Run (1965)
- Great day in Holland: the skating race (1965)
- Everybody's Land (1967)
- Flight from the Polar Night (1968)
- Steffos and his Easter lamb (1969)

She is best known as a writer of children's and young adult books, but also wrote eight novels for adults. She did not shy away from controversial topics in her children's books and consciously strove to make her readers think. She often tried to bridge differences between people and cultures by removing misunderstandings and developing an understanding for others.

Her work is also characterized by thorough preparation (she often traveled to do research), as well as realism, involvement with the characters, and versatility. She did not limit herself to one genre, but wrote historical stories, psychological novels and thrillers.

Her work has been translated into numerous languages.

Van der Loeff died on August 19, 1990, in Laren, North Holland.

== Awards and honours ==
In 1967 she won the Staatsprijs voor kinder- en jeugdliteratuur literary award. She won the Deutscher Jugendliteraturpreis in 1957 and 1977. Her work has also received many awards, including the Dutch State Prize for children's and youth literature (Staatsprijs voor kinder- en jeugdliteratuur,), the Austrian State Prize for youth literature and the German Youth Book Prize.

In 1976 she was appointed Knight in the Order of Order of Orange-Nassau for her contribution to Dutch children's literature.
