= Inside Detroit =

1956 film by Fred F. Sears

- Theatrical release poster
- Directed by: Fred F. Sears
- Written by: Robert E. Kent; James B. Gordon
- Produced by: Sam Katzman
- Starring: Dennis O'Keefe; Pat O'Brien; Tina Carver
- Cinematography: Henry Freulich
- Edited by: Gene Havlick
- Production company: Clover Productions
- Distributed by: Columbia Pictures
- Release date: December 9, 1955
- Running time: 82 minutes
- Country: United States
- Language: English
- Budget: Unknown

Inside Detroit is a 1955 American film noir crime film directed by Fred F. Sears and starring Dennis O'Keefe, Pat O'Brien and Tina Carver.

Inside Detroit is centered on corruption within the United Auto Workers union and is loosely adapted from the true tale of the Reuther brothers. The film's sets were designed by the art director Paul Palmentola.

== Plot ==
Blair Vickers (O'Keefe) is head of the UAW union whose brother is killed during the bombing of the union headquarters. Gus Linden (O'Brien), a gangster determined to gain control of the UAW, is the man behind the bombing.

== Cast ==
- Dennis O'Keefe as Blair Vickers
- Pat O'Brien as Gus Linden
- Tina Carver as Joni Calvin
- Margaret Field as Barbara Linden
- Mark Damon as Gregg Linden
- Larry J. Blake as Max Harkness
- Ken Christy as Ben Macauley
- Joe Turkel as Pete Link
- Paul Bryar as Sam Foran
- Robert E. Griffin as Hoagy Mitchell
- Guy Kingsford as Jenkins
- Dick Rich as Toby Gordon
- Norman Leavitt as Preacher Bronislav
- Katherine Warren as Ethel Linden

== Bibliography ==
- Spicer, Andrew. Historical Dictionary of Film Noir. Scarecrow Press, 2010.
