= Don Haggerty =

American actor (1914–1988)

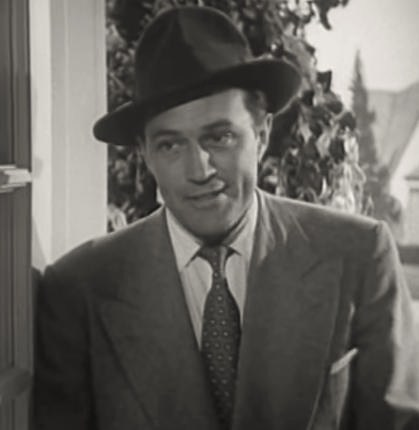
- Haggerty in Cause for Alarm! (1951)
- Born: July 3, 1914; Poughkeepsie, New York
- Died: August 19, 1988 (aged 74); Port St. John, Florida, U.S.
- Education: Brown University
- Occupation: Actor
- Years active: 1930's–1981

Don Haggerty (July 3, 1914 – August 19, 1988) was an American actor of film and television.

== Early life and education ==
Haggerty was born in Poughkeepsie, New York.

Before he began appearing in films in 1947, Haggerty was a Brown University athlete and attended the Experimental Theatre of Vassar College. He served in the United States Army from March 1943 to March 1946 in counterintelligence.

== Career ==
Usually cast as tough policemen or cowboys, Haggerty appeared in films such as Sands of Iwo Jima (1949), The Asphalt Jungle (1951), Angels in the Outfield (1951) and The Narrow Margin. The B-movie actor continued to appear in films until the early 1980s.

Between 1949 and 1955, Haggerty made four guest appearances in the television series The Lone Ranger – twice as outlaws, once as a crooked sheriff, and once as a genuine sheriff. From 1954 to 1955, he starred in the syndicated private eye series The Files of Jeffrey Jones. In the 1955–1956 season, Haggerty appeared as the outlaw Sam Bass in an episode of Jim Davis's syndicated Stories of the Century. About this time, he also appeared on CBS in the Reed Hadley legal drama The Public Defender. He played the lead role in the DuMont series The Cases of Eddie Drake (filmed 1949, aired 1952).

In 1956–1957, Haggerty appeared as Sheriff Elder in nine episodes of the syndicated western-themed crime drama State Trooper. He appeared in three episodes of the syndicated western 26 Men. In 1959, he guest starred in Bruce Gordon's NBC docudrama about the Cold War, Behind Closed Doors.

Haggerty appeared 21 times, including 19 in 1955 and 1956, as newspaperman Marsh Murdock in the ABC/Desilu western series The Life and Legend of Wyatt Earp. In 1960, he appeared as Marshal Bill Thompson in the episode "Alibi" on the ABC/Warner Brothers western series Colt .45.

In 1959, Haggerty portrayed Harry Moxton in the episode "No Laughing Matter" of the NBC crime drama Richard Diamond, Private Detective. Also in 1959, he guest starred on the TV western series Bat Masterson as crooked casino owner Jess Porter.

In 1960, Haggerty appeared as Joe Haynes on the TV western Tales of Wells Fargo in the episode "Doc Dawson". Haggerty guest starred in 1960 in the NBC crime drama Dan Raven and the CBS Rawhide episode "Incident of the Silent Web" in the role of Chaney and he played Sheriff Brinkley in the episode, "Incident at Cactus Wells". He also appeared in the NBC western series The Californians and Riverboat.

Haggerty was cast as Joe Wine in the 1961 episode "Alien Entry" of another syndicated series, The Blue Angels. About this time, he guest starred in the episode "The Green Gamblers" of the syndicated crime drama The Brothers Brannagan. He was also cast in 1963 in an episode of the NBC modern western series Redigo. Haggerty appeared as a guest star in My Favorite Martian as Detective Sergeant Seeley in 1964's episode "Uncle Martin's Broadcast" and as a bank guard in 1965's "Hate Me a Little". In 1967, he portrayed a sheriff on Rango in the episode "A Little Mexican Town." He appeared on Bonanza seven times in various roles between 1962 and 1972.

== Death ==
Haggerty died in Port St. John, Florida, on August 19, 1988, aged 74.

== Selected filmography ==
- Back Door to Heaven (1939) – Jail Guard at Desk (uncredited)
- USS VD: Ship of Shame (1942) – Ship Officer (uncredited)
- The Gangster (1947) – Thug Messenger (uncredited)
- Mystery Range (1947) – Deputy Tom Emery
- Silent Conflict (1948) – 2nd. Rancher
- The Dead Don't Dream (1948) – Deputy Sheriff
- Fighting Father Dunne (1948) – Gorilla Blake (uncredited)
- Sinister Journey (1948) – Harmon Roberts
- Train to Alcatraz (1948) – Billings
- Borrowed Trouble (1948) – Lippy
- Pitfall (1948) – District Attorney's Man (uncredited)
- That Lady in Ermine (1948) – Staff Officer (uncredited)
- Angel in Exile (1948) – Deputy Sheriff (uncredited)
- The Gentleman from Nowhere (1948) – Bill Cook (uncredited)
- False Paradise (1948) – Deal Marden
- Command Decision (1948) – Command Officer (uncredited)
- Gun Smugglers (1948) – Sheriff Schurslock
- Act of Violence (1949) – Policeman (uncredited)
- Rustlers (1949) – Rancher #1
- El Paso (1949) – Deputy (uncredited)
- The Crooked Way (1949) – Hood
- Canadian Pacific (1949) – Cagle
- King of the Rocket Men (1949, Serial) – Tony Dirken
- South of Rio (1949) – Henchman Chuck Bowers
- Scene of the Crime (1949) – Detective (uncredited)
- Sands of Iwo Jima (1949) – Colonel in Staff Car (uncredited)
- Cowboy and the Prizefighter (1949) – Steve Stevenson
- Malaya (1949) – Submarine Commander (uncredited)
- Gun Smugglers (1949)
- The Sundowners (1950) – Sheriff Elmer Gall
- The Kid from Texas (1950) – Morgan
- Side Street (1950) – Rivers (uncredited)
- Dynamite Pass (1950) – Sheriff in Cliffton
- The Vanishing Westerner (1950) – Henchman Art
- Storm Over Wyoming (1950) – The Marshal
- Shadow on the Wall (1950) – Night Duty Physician (uncredited)
- The Asphalt Jungle (1950) – Det. Andrews (uncredited)
- Armored Car Robbery (1950) – Detective Cuyler
- Vigilante Hideout (1950) – Jim Benson
- Lonely Heart Bandits (1950) – Dane (uncredited)
- Gambling House (1950) – Sharky
- Spoilers of the Plains (1951) – Henchman Ben Rix
- Cause for Alarm! (1951) – Mr. Russell
- Quebec (1951) – Col. Jean Durossac
- Fighting Coast Guard (1951) – Marine Captain (uncredited)
- Go for Broke! (1951) – Sgt. Wilson I. Culley
- That's My Boy (1951) – Tom, Masseur (uncredited)
- No Questions Asked (1951) – Mounted Policeman (uncredited)
- Rich, Young and Pretty (1951) – Tom, Legionnaire (uncredited)
- Rhubarb (1951) – Policeman (uncredited)
- The Strip (1951) – Arresting Detective (uncredited)
- Angels in the Outfield (1951) – Rube Ronson
- The Stooge (1951) – Mr. Winston (uncredited)
- Callaway Went Thataway (1951) – Director Don
- Sailor Beware (1952) – Lt. Connors (uncredited)
- Hoodlum Empire (1952) – Mark Flynn (uncredited)
- Bronco Buster (1952) – Dobie Carson
- The Narrow Margin (1952) – Det. Wilson (uncredited)
- Wild Stallion (1952) – Sgt. Keach
- Denver and Rio Grande (1952) – Bob Nelson
- Skirts Ahoy! (1952) – Military Police Sergeant (uncredited)
- Glory Alley (1952) – Gambler (uncredited)
- Roar of the Crowd (1953) – Chuck Baylor
- Hannah Lee (1953) – Bill Crashaw
- City of Bad Men (1953) – Bob Thrailkill (uncredited)
- Take the High Ground! (1953) – Commanding Officer (uncredited)
- Combat Squad (1953) – Sgt. Wiley
- Jubilee Trail (1954) – New York Detective (uncredited)
- Phantom Stallion (1954) – Foreman Gil
- Loophole (1954) – Neil Sanford
- The Rocket Man (1954) – Officer Mike O'Brien
- Return from the Sea (1954) – Tompkins
- Naked Alibi (1954) – Matt Matthews
- Cry Vengeance (1954) – Lt. Pat Ryan
- The Atomic Kid (1954) – Lieutenant (uncredited)
- Strategic Air Command (1955) – Major – Patrol Commander (uncredited)
- An Annapolis Story (1955) – Lt. Prentiss
- The Eternal Sea (1955) – Commander
- Air Strike (1955) – Lt. Richard Huggins
- I Cover the Underworld (1955) – Prison Guard (uncredited)
- The Private War of Major Benson (1955) – Harold Hibler
- The Desperate Hours (1955) – Detective (uncredited)
- Texas Lady (1955) – Sheriff Herndon
- Crashing Las Vegas (1956) – Tony Murlock
- Somebody Up There Likes Me (1956) – Leavenworth Prison Guard (uncredited)
- Calling Homicide (1956) – Det. Sgt. Mike Duncan
- Chain of Evidence (1957) – Sgt. Mike Duncan
- Spring Reunion (1957) – Pete (uncredited)
- Spoilers of the Forest (1957) – Williams the Ranger (uncredited)
- Footsteps in the Night (1957) – Sgt. Mike Duncan
- Back from the Dead (1957) – John Mitchell
- Jet Pilot (1957) – Sergeant (uncredited)
- The Crooked Circle (1957) – Adams
- The Sad Sack (1957) – Capt. Ward (uncredited)
- Day of the Badman (1958) – Deputy Floyd
- Blood Arrow (1958) – Gabe
- Cattle Empire (1958) – Ralph Hamilton
- The Man Who Died Twice (1958) – Frank
- Some Came Running (1958) – Ted Harperspoon (uncredited)
- The Gunfight at Dodge City (1959) – Sheriff Jim Regan, Dodge City
- Don't Give Up the Ship (1959) – Cmdr. Turner (uncredited)
- The Purple Gang (1959) – Minor Role (uncredited)
- Bat Masterson (1960) – Gordon Hall
- Seven Ways from Sundown (1960) – Dick Durton
- Hell Is for Heroes (1962) – Capt. Mace
- Papa's Delicate Condition (1963) – Gambler (uncredited)
- The Killers (1964) – Mail Truck Driver
- My Favorite Martian 1964 episode "Uncle Martin's Broadcast" - Sgt. Seeley
- Harlow (1965) – Police Captain (uncredited)
- That Funny Feeling (1965) – Policeman #1
- The Great Sioux Massacre (1965) – Senator Blaine
- The Loved One (1965) – Haggerty
- The Night of the Grizzly (1966) – Sam Potts
- Skin Game (1971) – Speaker
- The Resurrection of Zachary Wheeler (1971) – Jake
- Dirty Harry (1971) – Minor Role (uncredited)
- Starbird and Sweet William (1973) – Hunter

== Television ==
Year	Title	Role	Notes
1959	Rawhide	Sheriff Mort Hendricks	S1:E17, "Incident of Fear in the Streets"
1960	Rawhide	Chaney	S2:E30, "Incident of the Silent Web"
1961	Rawhide	Brewster	S3:E29, "Incident of the Night on the Town"
1962	Rawhide	Sheriff Brinkley	S5:E4, "Incident at Cactus Wells"
1963	Rawhide	Abe	S5:E22, "Incident of the Married Widow"
1963	Rawhide	Bartender	S6:E7, "Incident at Two Graves"
