= The Disembodied (film) =

- Lobby card
- Directed by: Walter Grauman
- Written by: Jack Townley
- Produced by: Ben Schwalb
- Starring: Paul Burke; Allison Hayes; John Wengraf; Eugenia Paul; Robert Christopher
- Cinematography: Harry Neumann
- Edited by: William Austin
- Music by: Marlin Skiles
- Production company: Allied Artists Pictures
- Distributed by: Allied Artists Pictures
- Release date: August 25, 1957 (United States)
- Running time: 66 minutes
- Country: United States
- Language: English

The Disembodied is a 1957 American horror film directed by Walter Grauman and starring Paul Burke, Allison Hayes, John Wengraf, Eugenia Paul, and Robert Christopher. It was released by Allied Artists on a double bill with From Hell It Came. The film is Grauman's first directing job.

== Plot ==
Searching for adventures, a photographer visits a remote tropical village where he meets a local married couple in the person of Dr. Metz and his strange native wife, Tonda, who is fond of Voodoo rituals and turns out to be a dark cult leader.

== Cast ==
- Paul Burke as Tom Maxwell
- Allison Hayes as Tonda Metz
- John Wengraf as Dr. Carl Metz
- Eugenia Paul as Mara, wife of Suba
- Joel Marston as Norman Adams
- Robert Christopher as Joe Lawson
- Dean Fredericks as Suba
- A.E. Ukonu as Lead Voodoo Drummer
- Paul Thompson as Gogi
- Otis Greene as Kabar

== Production ==
The film was made using many of the crew who worked on the Bowery Boys movies.

== Reception ==
Variety called it an "okay meller which generally sustains interest and should please the young ’uns."
