= Sudden Danger =

1955 film by Hubert Cornfield

- Theatrical release poster
- Directed by: Hubert Cornfield
- Written by: Daniel B. Ullman; Elwood Ullman
- Story by: Daniel B. Ullman
- Produced by: Ben Schwalb
- Starring: Bill Elliott; Tom Drake
- Cinematography: Ellsworth Fredricks
- Edited by: William Austin
- Music by: Marlin Skiles
- Distributed by: Allied Artists Pictures
- Release date: December 18, 1955 (United States)
- Running time: 65 minutes
- Country: United States
- Language: English

Sudden Danger is a 1955 American film noir crime drama directed by Hubert Cornfield and starring Bill Elliott, Beverly Garland, and Tom Drake.

== Plot ==
Mrs. Curtis, a partner in a clothing manufacturing company, is found dead by her grown son Wally, who is blind. Although a suicide note is found at the scene, police detective Andy Doyle suspects that the victim was murdered. Conflicting reports gathered by Doyle point to Wally as the perpetrator. While Wally tries to clear himself, Lt. Doyle ferrets out more information that leads him to some hidden intrigue at the manufacturing company. Doyle exposes a massive swindle, which leads him to the true killer.

== Cast ==
- Bill Elliott as Lt. Andy Doyle
- Tom Drake as Wally Curtis
- Beverly Garland as Phyllis Baxter
- Dayton Lummis as Raymond Wilkins
- Helene Stanton as Vera
- Lucien Littlefield as Dave Glennon
- Minerva Urecal as Mrs. Kelly
- Lyle Talbot as Harry Woodruff
- John Close as Sgt. Mike Duncan
- Frank Jenks as Kenny the bartender
- Pierre Watkin as George Caldwell
- Ralph Gamble as Dr. Hastings

== Reception ==
Independent Film Journal reported, "Sudden Danger is a slick supporting feature that is surprisingly entertaining. Photography on the feature, which looks much more costly than its budget, is excellent and adds a lot in establishing the mood of the story. Stars Bill Elliott, Tom Drake, and Beverly Garland along with the carefully selected cast all deliver solidly." Trade publisher Pete Harrison said, "Intelligent direction has made this rather weak story into a good program entertainment for the double-bill market. Bill Elliott goes through his paces in his usual competent manner. The acting of the entire cast is good. The photography is first-rate." William R. Weaver of Motion Picture Herald noted, "Bill Elliott, playing a police detective this time, is the top name in this tangled tale of murder for money, and his public is sure to like his well timed, tight-lipped performance. The plot has some complications and convolutions that are out of the ordinary. The secret of the identity of the killer is well kept until close to the end."

== See also ==
- Dial Red O (1955)
- Calling Homicide (1956)
- Chain of Evidence (1957)
- Footsteps in the Night (1957)
- List of American films of 1955
