= From Hell It Came =

1957 American horror film

- Theatrical release poster
- Directed by: Dan Milner
- Screenplay by: Richard Bernstein
- Story by: Richard Bernstein; Jack Milner
- Produced by: Jack Milner
- Starring: Tod Andrews; Tina Carver; Linda Watkins; John McNamara; Gregg Palmer; Robert Swan; Baynes Barron; Suzanne Ridgeway; Chester Hayes
- Cinematography: Brydon Baker
- Edited by: Jack Milner
- Music by: Darrell Calker
- Production company: Milner Brothers Productions
- Distributed by: Allied Artists Pictures
- Release date: August 25, 1957 (United States)
- Running time: 71 minutes
- Country: United States
- Language: English

From Hell It Came is a 1957 American science-fiction horror film directed by Dan Milner and written by Richard Bernstein, from a story by Bernstein and Jack Milner. It was released by Allied Artists in August 1957, on a double bill with The Disembodied (1957).

== Plot ==
Kimo, prince of a South Seas island whose residents are suffering a plague epidemic, is accused of murdering his father, the chief of the island natives. Kimo is alleged to have administered to his father poisonous medicine provided by a group of American scientists stationed on a field laboratory on the island. The true murderers of Kimo's father—Tano, a witch doctor, and Maranka, the new chief—sentence Kimo to be executed by having a knife driven into his heart. Kimo begs his wife Korey to exonerate him, but she denies his innocence. He swears revenge on Tano, Korey, and the new chief, Maranka. After his execution, Kimo is buried in a hollow tree trunk.

American doctor Terry Mason arrives to the island on assignment to help conduct research and treat natives affected with the plague. She is greeted by Dr. William Arnold, one of the scientists already stationed on the island. They meet up with fellow scientist Professor Clark, and Terry is introduced to Mrs. Kilgore, who runs a trading post on the island. Norgu, an island native, visits the laboratory with his wife Dori. Dori is recovering from the plague, and is also suffering from slight radiation burns, the result of nuclear fallout caused by the dropping of an atomic bomb on a nearby atoll.

Later, Terry and William come across Kimo's grave, and find a tree stump growing out of it. After they inquire to Clark about how a stump could be growing out of the ground, Norgu recounts a legend of an island chief who returned from the dead in the form of a vengeful tree monster called a "Tabanga". (Note: Some literary sources spell the monster's name as "Tabanga", while others spell it as "Tabonga". An official pressbook for the film refers to the monster as "Taranga".) The scientists determine that the tree stump is radioactive and has a pulse. They remove it from the ground and bring it to their laboratory. When its pulse begins to weaken, Terry injects it with a formula to keep it alive. By the next day, the tree stump, a Tabanga, escapes from the laboratory.

Korey laments that Maranka, for whom she betrayed Kimo, acts coldly towards her in favor of another woman, Naomi. Jealous, Korey tries to attack Naomi with a knife, but the pair encounter the Tabanga. Naomi flees, and the Tabanga kills Korey by throwing her into a pit of quicksand. It then finds Chief Maranka and fatally throttles him. Tano and the other natives, after learning that Kimo has been resurrected as a Tabanga, lure the monster into a pit, which they set aflame. However, the Tabanga emerges from the fiery pit and finds Tano again. It throws Tano down a hill, causing him to be impaled on a woody plant below.

At the insistence of some natives, the scientists go out searching for the Tabanga. The Tabanga abducts Terry and attempts to throw her into the quicksand. Eddie, an American who was previously stationed in the same location as one of Terry's prior assignments, fires shots at the Tabanga. One of the bullets hits the knife which still protrudes from the monster's chest, causing it to be driven fully into its heart. The Tabanga sinks into the quicksand, dead. William and Terry embrace, and a native asks Professor Clark if he is willing to replace Tano as the island's new "witch doctor."

== Cast ==
- Tod Andrews as Dr. William Arnold
- Tina Carver as Dr. Terry Mason
- Linda Watkins as Mrs. Mae Kilgore
- John McNamara as Prof. Clark
- Gregg Palmer as Kimo
- Robert Swan as Tano
- Baynes Barron as Chief Maranka
- Suzanne Ridgeway as Korey
- Mark Sheeler as Eddie
- Lee Rhodes as Norgu
- Grace Mathews as Orchid
- Tani Marsh as Naomi
- Chester Hayes as Maku / The Tabanga
- Lenmana Guerin as Dori

== Production ==
The Tabanga monster was designed initially by Paul Blaisdell (also known for his work on The She-Creature, Invasion of the Saucer Men, Not of This Earth and It! The Terror from Beyond Space) and was manufactured by Don Post Studios. Blaisdell was only paid to sketch the monster, not to actually build it or operate it. Blaisdell's design was of a thin, spindly tree-monster with long spidery branches, which proved too narrow to fit a man inside of the costume. The producers reworked Blaisdell's design and filled the creature out more, making him much shorter and squatter, and shortening his arms. Actor Chester Hayes wound up playing the monster in the film, and Blaisdell marveled at how the man was able to operate and maneuver the heavy rubber suit. This was the second and last feature film to be produced by the Milner brothers.

== Release ==
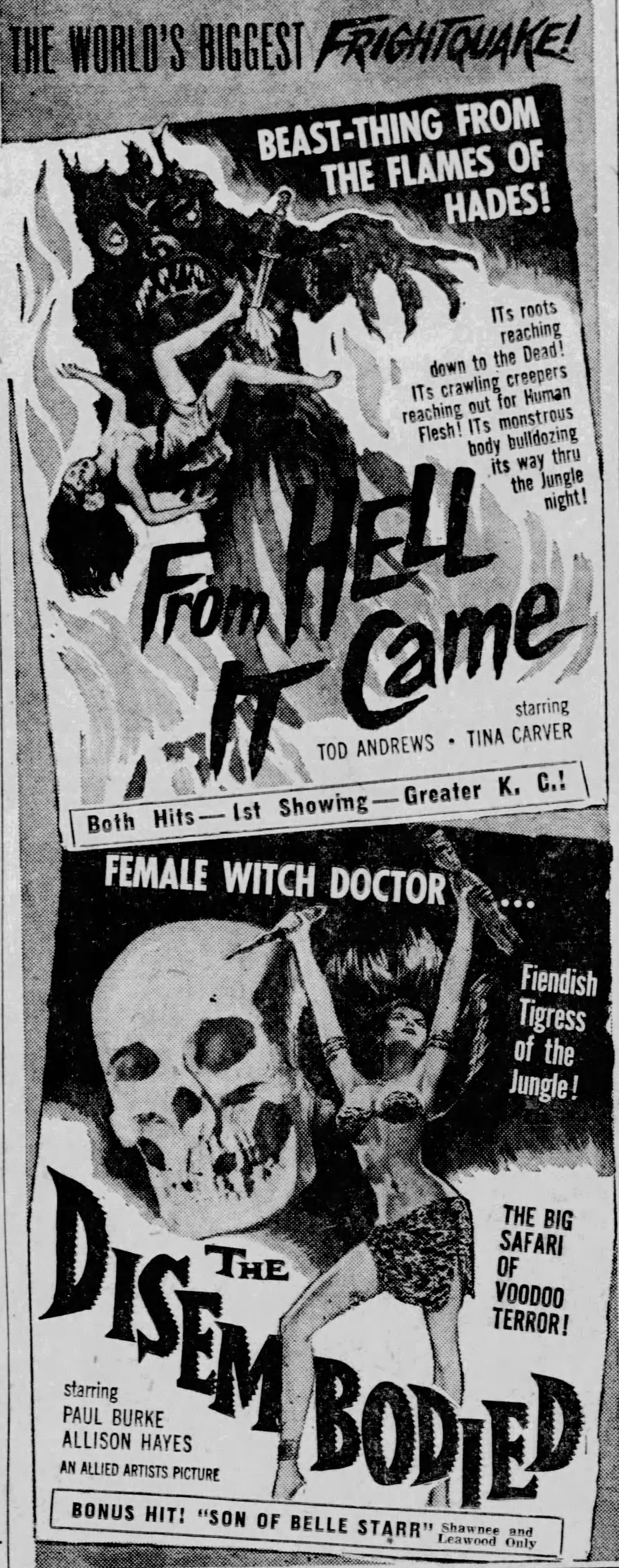
Advertisement from 1957 for From Hell It Came and co-feature, The Disembodied

(1957).

From Hell It Came was released by Allied Artists in August 1957 on a double bill with The Disembodied (1957).

=== Critical reception ===
According to film historian Tim Healey, From Hell It Came deserves an honored place in the canon of the world's worst movies. Author and movie critic Leonard Maltin awarded the film one-and-a-half out of four stars, writing that, "As walking-tree movies go, this is at the top of the list." In his review for AllMovie, originally written in 2013, Bruce Eder panned the film:

The sheer badness of Dan Milner's From Hell It Came is mitigated ever so slightly by the efforts of Paul Blaisdell, who created the vengeful tree-creature called the Tabonga. Now, the creature itself it pretty ludicrous in its actual on-screen appearances, but given the fact that we're talking about a killer tree-stump...and a low-budget, the fact that Blaisdell was able to devise anything at all that, even for a fraction of a second, might be scary, is the one part of the movie that does work. Nothing else does...All of which leaves ridiculously campy fun as the sole reason to watch this very mildly entertaining misfire, which is funnier in the telling than the watching.

A reviewer for TV Guide awarded the film two out of five stars, calling it "silly" and "really goofy". Critic Ed Naha famously said 'And to hell it can go!'.

John Landis described the monster (which he called the "Tobonga") as "one of the dumbest-looking monsters in film."

== Home media ==
Through its Warner Archive Collection, Warner Home Video released the film on DVD on November 11, 2009, and on Blu-ray on April 25, 2017.
