= Footsteps in the Night (film) =

- Directed by: Jean Yarbrough
- Written by: Albert Band; Elwood Ullman
- Produced by: Ben Schwalb
- Starring: Bill Elliott; Don Haggerty; Eleanore Tanin
- Cinematography: Harry Neumann
- Edited by: Neil Brunnenkant
- Music by: Marlin Skiles
- Production company: Allied Artists
- Distributed by: Allied Artists
- Release date: April 14, 1957
- Running time: 62 minutes
- Country: United States
- Language: English

Footsteps in the Night is a 1957 American film noir crime film directed by Jean Yarbrough and starring Bill Elliott, Don Haggerty and Eleanore Tanin. It was the last in a series of five films made by Allied Artists featuring Elliott as a police detective.

== Cast ==
- Bill Elliott as Lt. Andy Doyle
- Don Haggerty as Sgt. Mike Duncan
- Eleanore Tanin as Mary Raiken
- Douglas Dick as Henry Johnson
- James Flavin as Mr. Bradbury
- Gregg Palmer as Pat Orvello
- Harry Tyler as Dick Harris, Sunset Villa Manager
- Ann Griffith as June Wright
- Robert Shayne as Fred Horner
- Forrest Taylor as Shaw, Sunset Vista Manager

== See also ==
- Dial Red O (1955)
- Sudden Danger (1955)
- Calling Homicide (1956)
- Chain of Evidence (1957)
- List of American films of 1957

== Bibliography ==
- Mayer, Geoff. Encyclopedia of American Film Serials. McFarland, 13 2017.
