= Apache Warrior =

1957 film by Elmo Williams

- Theatrical release poster
- Directed by: Elmo Williams
- Screenplay by: Carroll Young; Kurt Neumann; Eric Norden
- Story by: Carroll Young; Kurt Neumann
- Produced by: Plato A. Skouras
- Starring: Keith Larsen; Jim Davis; Rodolfo Acosta; John Miljan; Damian O'Flynn; George Keymas
- Cinematography: John M. Nickolaus, Jr.
- Edited by: Jodie Copelan
- Music by: Paul Dunlap
- Production company: Regal Films Inc
- Distributed by: 20th Century Fox
- Release date: July 1957
- Running time: 74 minutes
- Country: United States
- Language: English

Apache Warrior is a 1957 American Western film directed by Elmo Williams and written by Carroll Young, Kurt Neumann and Eric Norden. The film stars Keith Larsen, Jim Davis, Rodolfo Acosta, John Miljan, Damian O'Flynn and George Keymas. The film was released in July 1957, by 20th Century Fox.

It was also known as Red Arrow, The Apache Kid and The Long Knives. Filming started March 1957.

== Cast ==
- Keith Larsen as Katawan aka The Apache Kid
- Jim Davis as Ben Ziegler
- Rodolfo Acosta as Marteen
- John Miljan as Chief Nantan
- Damian O'Flynn as Major
- George Keymas as Chato
- Lane Bradford as Sgt. Gaunt
- Dehl Berti as Chikisin
- Eugenia Paul as Liwana
- Nick Thompson as Horse Trader
- Eddie Little Sky as Apache
- Michael Carr as Apache
- Ray Kellogg as Bounty Hunter
- Karl Davis as Bounty Man
- David Carlile as Cavalry Leader
- Allan Nixon as Bounty Hunter
