= Eugenia Paul =

American actress

- Born: Eugenia Popoff; March 3, 1935; Dearborn, Michigan, U.S.
- Died: May 24, 2010 (aged 75); West Palm Beach, Florida, U.S.
- Occupations: Actress dancer
- Spouse: Robert Strauss (m. 1958)
- Children: 3

Eugenia Paul (born Eugenia Popoff; March 3, 1935 – May 24, 2010) was an American actress and dancer best known for her role as Elena Torres in the television series Zorro, which aired on the American television network ABC.

== Early years ==
Paul was born Eugenia Popoff in Dearborn, Michigan, of Russian heritage. Her parents were Mr. and Mrs. Frederick K. Popoff. Her father was an employee of Ford Motor Company; her mother, Monica, taught piano and violin after having been a concert violinist. She had one older brother and two younger brothers. Her grandfather was the priest at a Russian Orthodox church in Chicago.

Paul initially wanted to be a ballet dancer. When she was 14 years old, she was invited to join the Ballet Theater company, but her mother preferred to have her continue her education.

== Career ==
Paul signed as a dancer with Warner Bros. when she was just 17 years old, while participating on a tour with the American Ballet Theatre and the Ballet Sketchbook television show. Paul danced in lead roles on screen. She also studied ballet with Bronislava Nijinska and drama and acting under Michael Chekhov. Paul departed Warner Bros. and signed with 20th Century Fox as an actor in 1955.

Paul's television debut occurred in 1954 in an episode of Cavalcade of America. Her other television credits included Alfred Hitchcock Presents, Medic, The Lone Ranger, Death Valley Days, The Adventures of Jim Bowie and the Playhouse 90 adaptation of The Great Gatsby and Sky King).

Paul's film credits including Lost in Alaska, Man on the Prowl, Apache Warrior and The Ten Commandments. Her last feature film role was in the western Gunfighters of Abilene in 1960.

Radio programs on which Paul appeared included Yours Truly, Johnny Dollar and Hall of Fame.

== Private life ==
Paul met her future husband, Pep Boys heir Robert Strauss, at a Hollywood Bowl party. The couple married on November 30, 1958, and Paul quit professional show business soon after her marriage. They had two daughters and a son and remained married for 52 years, until her death in 2010.

== Death ==
Paul died of complications of edema on May 24, 2010, at Good Samaritan Medical Center in West Palm Beach, Florida, at the age of 75.

== Filmography ==
Year	Title	Role	Notes
1954	Jivaro	Native Bit	
1954	The Adventures of Hajji Baba	Shireen	Uncredited
1956	Alfred Hitchcock Presents	Dolores Dawn	Season 1 Episode 36: "Mink"
1956	Alfred Hitchcock Presents	Viola	Season 2 Episode 7: "Alibi Me"
1956	The Revolt of Mamie Stover	Minor Role	Uncredited
1956	Bigger Than Life	Saleslady	Uncredited
1956	The Ten Commandments	Hebrew Girl at Sphinx	Uncredited
1957	Apache Warrior	Liwana	
1957	The Disembodied	Mara, wife of Suba	
1957	Man on the Prowl	Dorothy Pierce	
1959	Frontier Doctor	Juanita	Episode: "Superstition Mountain"
1959	Gunfighters of Abilene	Raquel Torena	(final film role)
