= Dehl Berti =

American actor (1921–1991)

- Dehl Berti in Invasion U.S.A. 1985
- Born: Dehl Berti; January 17, 1921; Pueblo, Colorado, US
- Died: November 26, 1991 (aged 70); Los Angeles, California, US
- Resting place: Oakwood Memorial Park Cemetery, Los Angeles
- Years active: 1953–1991
- Spouses: Francis Cummins Collins (m. 1944–1962) Zerrin Arbaş (m. 1967–1973)
- Children: 3

Dehl Berti (January 17, 1921 – November 26, 1991) was an American actor of Chiricahua Apache descent who often appeared in Westerns. One of his more recognized roles was as John Taylor on the 1988–1991 CBS western television series, Paradise, starring Lee Horsley as the reformed gunfighter Ethan Allen Cord.

== Life and career ==
A native of Pueblo, Colorado, of Apache descent, he married Francis Cummins Collins in 1944.

Berti appeared in guest-starring roles on many television programs from the 1950s through the 1980s, primarily in westerns such as Bonanza, Bat Masterson and Gunsmoke, but in other roles as well. In 1960, Berti appeared as Joe Maybe on Cheyenne in the episode titled "The Long Rope." In 1963, he played the Indian, Little Buffalo, in the episode "The Day of the Flying Dutchman" on ABC's western series, The Travels of Jaimie McPheeters, starring child actor Kurt Russell. In 1982, he costarred as One Feather on the short-lived NBC drama series Born to the Wind.

Berti's final appearance was on a 1990 episode of the sitcom, Saved by the Bell. Since 1982, Berti can be heard as the voice of Chief Joseph of the Nez Perce in The American Adventure at Walt Disney World's Epcot Center in Florida.

Berti died of a heart attack in Los Angeles, California, on November 26, 1991, at the age of 70.

== Work ==
His films include: Toughest Man Alive (1955); Apache Warrior (1957); Undersea Girl (1957); Under Fire (1957); Hell Bound (1957); Ritual of Evil (1970); Seven Alone (1974); Sweet Hostage (1975); Last of the Mohicans (1977); Wolfen (1981); Laguna Heat (1987); Second Thoughts (1983); Invasion U.S.A. (1985); and Bullies (1986). He also appeared in an episode of Universal's 1980's CBS-TV series Simon & Simon entitled "Ancient Echoes" (1987).

== Partial filmography ==
- Jump Into Hell (1955) – Lt. Tiercelin (uncredited)
- Toughest Man Alive (1955) – Salvador
- The Ten Commandments (1956) – Pharaoh's Manservant / Architect's Assistant (uncredited)
- Apache Warrior (1957) – Chikisin
- Undersea Girl (1957) – Joe, Gang Member
- Under Fire (1957) – Col. Jason (uncredited)
- Hell Bound (1957) – Daddy
- Seven Alone (1974) – White Elk
- Sweet Hostage (1975) – Harry Fox
- Scott Free (1976) – George Running Bear
- Last of the Mohicans (1977)
- Wolfen (1981) – Old Indian
- The American Adventure (1982) – Chief Joseph (voice)
- Second Thoughts (1983) – Indian
- Invasion U.S.A. (1985) – John Eagle
- Bullies (1986) – Will Crow
- Laguna Heat (1987) – Azul Mercante
