= The Resurrection of Zachary Wheeler =

1971 film

- Video artwork
- Directed by: Bob Wynn
- Written by: Jay Simms; Tom Rolf (story)
- Produced by: Robert Stabler
- Starring: Leslie Nielsen Bradford Dillman Angie Dickinson
- Cinematography: Bob Boatman
- Edited by: Jerry Greene
- Music by: Marlin Skiles
- Production company: Madison Productions, Inc.
- Distributed by: Gold Key Enterprises
- Release date: November 1971
- Running time: 100 minutes
- Country: United States
- Language: English

The Resurrection of Zachary Wheeler is a 1971 science fiction film directed by Bob Wynn and starring Leslie Nielsen, Bradford Dillman and Angie Dickinson. This was one of the earliest films to depict medical exploitation of cloning, even though the term was not used. It was shot on videotape and transferred to film for theatrical and TV release. Gold Key Entertainment commissioned this film at the same time as it commissioned the film The Day of the Wolves, and tried to persuade Ferde Grofe to film that on video because of the cost savings, but he declined.

== Plot ==
Reporter Harry Walsh (Nielsen) witnesses an auto accident in which two people are killed. Recognizing the survivor as Senator Clayton Zachary Wheeler (Dillman), he rides with him in the ambulance.

After he reports Wheeler's accident from the hospital, the staff tell him there is no such person admitted. Walsh's editor orders him to retract his story, which he refuses to do, at the cost of his job. Some detective work leads him to Alamogordo, New Mexico.

Meanwhile, Wheeler wakes up in a secret hospital run by Dr. Redding (Daly) and Dr. Layle Johnson (Dickinson). He finds out he is the recipient of an incredible transplant, utilizing organs harvested from "somas". These somas are bodies artificially grown from his own DNA.

Walsh has to elude two less-than-brilliant agents on his way to Alamogordo, finally escaping them, traveling with some migrant workers. Wheeler learns that the "fee" for his surgery is to do whatever he can do as Senator, for the Committee—a form of medical blackmail. Fielding (Wilke), the Committee chairman, refers to it as "a new type of money." Wheeler refuses to cooperate and threatens to turn the whole operation in. Fielding warns him he will never win a presidential nomination if news of his heart transplant gets out.

In Alamogordo, Walsh deduces that Wheeler's plane must have gone to Los Alamos, site of the old Manhattan Project. With the help of a newspaper buddy, he lands at the base and discovers an extra soma of Wheeler. Thinking it to be the senator, he breaks it out and commandeers Dr. Johnson's car.

The car crashes as Walsh maneuvers to avoid colliding with several individuals meandering around. Johnson sustains injuries, prompting Fielding to exploit the situation in an attempt to sway Wheeler's stance, threatening to withhold assistance. Despite Wheeler's growing attachment to her, his determination wavers, although Redding assures him that her injuries are minor.

Walsh and Wheeler finally meet, and agree to expose the Committee together, even as Fielding and Redding discuss a new "client" they have been hoping for.

== Cast ==
- Leslie Nielsen ... Harry Walsh
- Bradford Dillman ... Sen. Clayton Zachary Wheeler/Soma
- James Daly ... Dr. Redding
- Angie Dickinson ... Dr. Layle Johnson
- Robert J. Wilke ... Hugh Fielding
- Jack Carter ... Dwight Chiles
- Don Haggerty ... Jake
- Lew Brown ... Collins
- Richard Schuyler ... Bates
- Dick Simmons ... Adams
- William Bryant ... Craig Harmon
- Tris Coffin ... Dr. Keating
- Peter Mamakos ... Premier Mabulla
- Ruben Moreno ... General Muñoz
- Steve Cory ... Carson
- Steve Conte ... Radio Opr. #2

== Production ==
Tom Rolf got the idea for the film reading about organ transplants in Esquire. At the time he was production coordinator on the TV series The Big Valley. Rolf told his friend Jay Simms, a writer on the series, about his idea. Together they wrote the film in about three weeks. They gave the script to Simms' agent, who liked it. Rolf felt that despite the low budget, the film was ahead of its time, and was pleased with it. Rolf was normally an editor and this film was his only writing credit. It took 17 days to shoot.

The name used for the clones, soma, is Greek for "body". They share the name with the hallucinogenic drug used by the urbanites in Aldous Huxley's 1932 novel, Brave New World. The film is noted as possibly the earliest to depict surgical transplants using clones for parts.

According to Variety, this was the first American film to be shot on videotape and transferred to film for release. Although 200 Motels was released the month before, the movie didn't have any actual plot. There had also been some other and earlier theatrical releases shot on black and white videotape, and transferred to film through the Electronovision process, which were recorded performances of stage plays and concerts.
