= Gunfighters of Abilene =

1960 film by Edward L. Cahn

- Directed by: Edward L. Cahn
- Written by: Orville H. Hampton
- Produced by: Robert E. Kent
- Starring: Buster Crabbe; Barton MacLane; Judith Ames
- Cinematography: Maury Gertsman
- Edited by: Edward Mann
- Music by: Paul Dunlap
- Color process: Black and white
- Production companies: Robert E. Kent Productions; Zenith Pictures
- Distributed by: United Artists
- Release date: January 1, 1960
- Running time: 67 minutes
- Country: United States
- Language: English

Gunfighters of Abilene is a 1960 American Western film directed by Edward L. Cahn and starring Buster Crabbe, Barton MacLane and Judith Ames.

== Plot ==
A gunfighter, Kip Tanner, is ambushed by three men who believe Kip's brother Gene swindled their boss, rancher Seth Hainline. A last-minute arrival by Marshal Wilkinson results in the men riding off and Kip coming to town, where he intends to find out what happened to Gene.

Kip concludes that Seth's men framed Gene, which concerns Seth's daughter Alice Hainline, who wanted Gene to marry her. Her own brother Jud makes an attempt on Kip's life, but hotel desk clerk Raquel Tareda comes to his rescue because she knows Gene to be innocent. Seth shoots at the wrong man, accidentally killing his own son instead of Kip, and ends up shot himself in a final gunfight.

== Cast ==
- Buster Crabbe as Kip Tanner
- Barton MacLane as Seth Hainline
- Rachel Ames as Alice Hainline (as Judith Ames)
- Russell Thorson as Marshal Wilkinson
- Lee Farr as Jud Hainline
- Eugenia Paul as Raquel Torena
- Jan Arvan as Miguel Torena
- Richard Devon as Marty Ruger
- Richard H. Cutting as Hendricks
- Kenneth MacDonald as Harker

== See also ==
- List of American films of 1960
