= Honoré Willsie Morrow =

American writer (1880–1940)

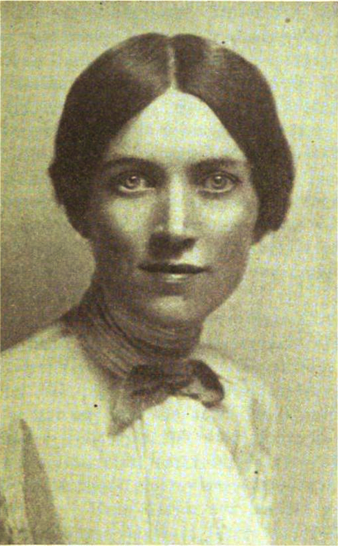
- Born: Nora Bryant McCue; February 19, 1880; Ottumwa, Iowa, U.S.
- Died: April 12, 1940 (aged 60); New Haven, Connecticut, U.S.
- Resting place: Exeter Cemetery, Exeter, New Hampshire, U.S.
- Education: University of Wisconsin
- Occupations: author; magazine editor
- Spouses: Henry Elmer Willsie (m. 1904; div. 1922); William Morrow (m. 1923; died 1931)
- Children: 4
- Writing career
- Language: English
- Genres: novel; short story
- Notable work: The Great Captain trilogy

Honoré Willsie Morrow (née, McCue; February 19, 1880 – April 12, 1940) was an American novelist and short story writer, as well as a magazine editor. Traveling to every state of the Union with her first husband, she used these experiences as background for her writing. Morrow is remembered for what became known as The Great Captain trilogy centered upon Abraham Lincoln: Forever Free (1927), With Malice Toward None (1928), and The Last Full Measure (1930). For five years, she served as the editor of The Delineator.

== Early life and education ==
Nora Bryant McCue was born in Ottumwa, Iowa, February 19, 1880. She was a descendant of New England pioneers of the West. Her parents were William Dunbar McCue (1846-1922) and Lillian Bryant Head (1852-1902). Her siblings were Philip, Helen, Cornelia, and Lydia. Her family's most important possession was their library of choice books. Here, as a child, she read the masters of English literature.

Morrow received her collegiate training in the writing of English at the University of Wisconsin (BA, 1902), where she earned a local reputation for her work on college magazines. While an upperclassman, Cedric, her Great Dane puppy, was a constant companion.

== Career ==
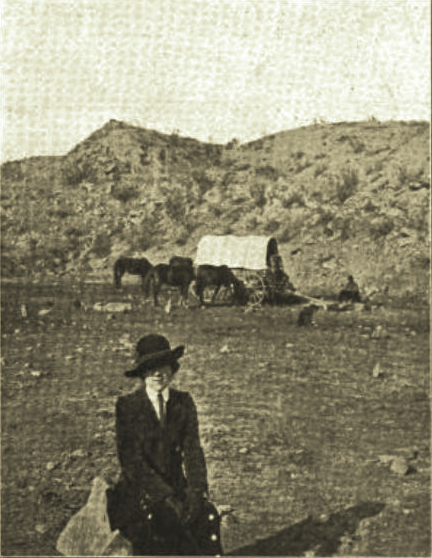
Willsie in Arizona

On August 1, 1904, in Blooming Grove, Wisconsin, she married Henry Elmer Willsie (1868-1948), a mining engineer. There followed two years in the Arizona desert. The desert trip was supplemented by long periods in the mining districts, the mountains, and the Northwestern dairy region. She never placed a novel in a setting unless it was intimately known to her.

Mr. Willsie hoped to become an inventor, while Mrs. Willsie was determined to become a novelist. Both felt that they needed the opportunities of the metropolis. About 1910, they came to New York City. Early on, she thought that her writing depended on inspiration; that she had to "write like made when that came", but could do nothing without it. Her husband encouraged her to keep a diary as a record of the work done each day. At first, it shocked her to discover how very little time—one, or two, or three hours—she actually spent in writing. She recognized that through keeping a schedule for her writing, she could accomplish more. She was advised to send her stories to Theodore Dreiser and it was from him that she received her first words of encouragement. He offered her editorial work at a good salary, but Mrs. Willsie preferred to stick to her writing. Her first novel, The Heart of the Desert, published in 1913 under the name "Honoré Willsie", won her immediate recognition.

"I took the job [as editor of The Delineator] because, while I was perfectly happy in what I was doing, earning a more or less uneven and precarious living as a writer of fiction, after thinking it over for a long time it seemed to me that it presented a great opportunity to an American." (Honoré Willsie, 1918)

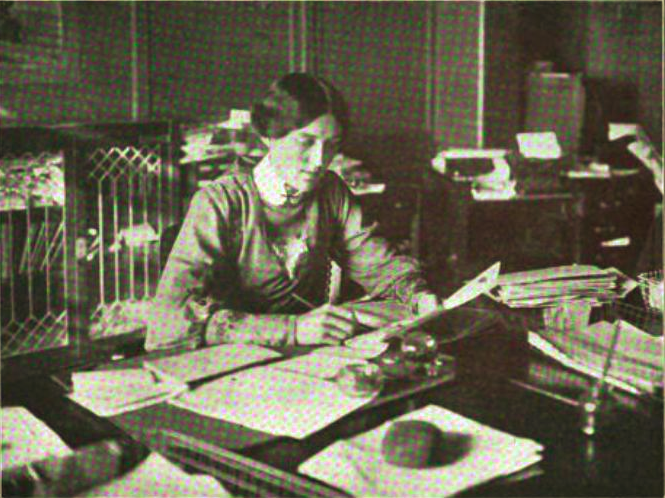
Willsie at her desk at The Delineator

Beginning in 1914 and for the next five years, she served as editor of The Delineator. In 1915, she published Still Jim. Morrow gave up executive work in 1919 to devote herself to fiction writing. Her other books included Lydia of the Pines, Benefits Forgot, The Forbidden Trail, The Enchanted Canyon, Judith of Godless Valley, The Exile of the Lariat, The Devonshers, and The Lost Speech of Abraham Lincoln.

In addition to novels, Morrow wrote many short stories, of which "Fighting Blood" was selected for The World's Best Short Stories of 1925. "The Lost Speech" was selected by Mrs. William B. Meloney as one of the best stories published in The Delineator in 1926. For Harper's Weekly and Collier's, she wrote a number of special articles on the problems of divorce, immigration, and the Reclamation Service.

She divorced Henry in 1922. In New York City, on April 24, 1923, she married the publisher, William Morrow (1873-1931). She was the mother of four children, including Richard, Felicia, and Anne.

== Later life ==
Widowed in 1931, Morrow moved to Brixham, Devon, England, where she lectured for the English Association. She lived there for eight years, and her residence in High Brixham, named "Heathstones", was created by the joining of two cottages. For six years, she served as president of the Brixham Literary and Debating Society.

In January 1940, she visited a sister in New Haven, Connecticut. Long ill, Honoré Morrow died at the Hospital of Saint Raphael on April 12, 1940. She was buried at Exeter Cemetery in Exeter, New Hampshire.

== Selected works and adaptations ==
Still Jim, 1915

Benefits Forgot, 1917

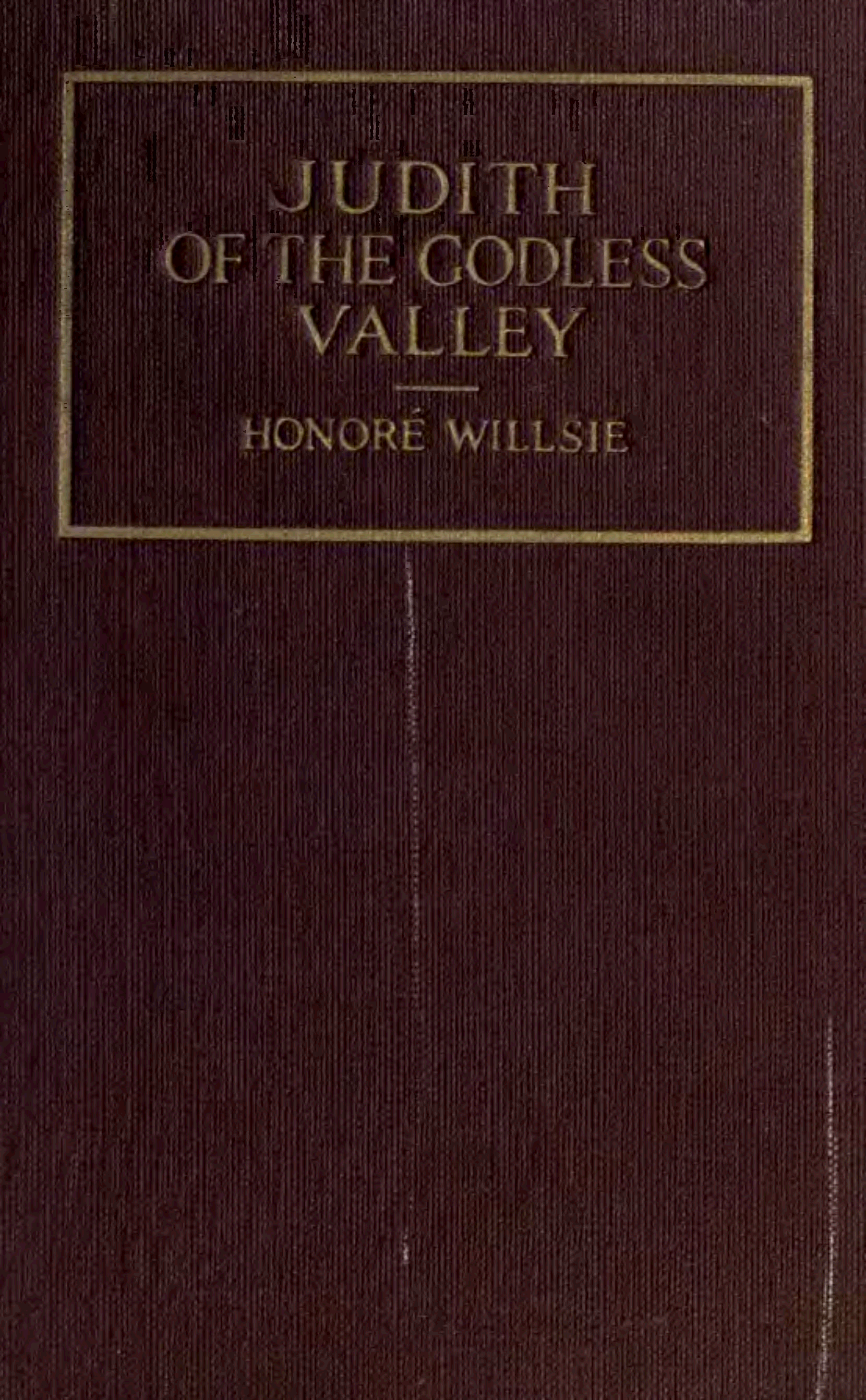
Judith of the Godless Valley, 1922

=== Novels ===
- The Heart of the Desert, 1913
- Still Jim, 1915
- Lydia of the Pines, 1917
- Benefits Forgot: A Story of Lincoln and Mother Love, 1917
- The Forbidden Trail, 1919
- The Enchanted Canyon, 1921
- Judith of the Godless Valley, 1922
- The Exile of the Lariat, 1923
- The Devonshers, 1924
- The Lost Speech of Abraham Lincoln, 1925
- On to Oregon!: The Story of a Pioneer Boy, 1926
- Let the King Beware
- Demon Daughter, 1939
- The Great Captain trilogy
  - Forever Free, 1927
  - With Malice Toward None, 1928
  - The Last Full Measure, 1930

=== Short stories ===
- "Fighting Blood", 1925

=== Film adaptations ===
- Seven Alone (1974) - adaptation of On to Oregon!: The Story of a Pioneer Boy
