= Marlin Skiles =

American composer

- Born: December 17, 1906; Harrisburg, Pennsylvania, United States
- Died: May 1, 1981 (aged 74); San Diego, California; United States
- Other name: Marlin Henderson Skiles
- Occupation: Composer
- Years active: 1934–1971 (film)

Marlin Skiles (December 17, 1906 – May 1, 1981) was an American composer of film and television scores.

== Early years ==
Pianist, arranger and composer Skiles was born in Harrisburg, Pennsylvania, in December 1906. He was the son of Mr. and Mrs. H. J. Stiles. He studied music at his local conservatory, later perfecting his training under Ernst Toch in Los Angeles. He graduated from Harrisburg Technical High School in 1925.

== Career ==
Skiles began his career when he was 17 years old. By the 1920s, he was employed as a pianist, arranger and orchestrator with big name dance bands like those of Paul Whiteman and Irving Aaronson and His Commanders. In Hollywood from 1932, he signed with Republic Pictures in 1943 was under contract there and at Columbia Pictures (1944–1948), often writing incidental music for second features. He occasionally composed original soundtracks for better productions, like A Thousand and One Nights (1945) or Dead Reckoning (1946). Skiles served as musical director for Columbia's mega-hit Gilda (1946), starring Rita Hayworth in her most famous role. He became a member of ASCAP that same year. Skiles worked as a free-lancer from the 1950s and retired in 1971.

Skiles and his orchestra provided music for the CBS radio program Crime Correspondent, and he was music director for the television series Death Valley Days.

== Personal life and death ==
Skiles married singer and actress Olive Jones, whose stage name was Olive Cromwell, on July 11, 1936, in Riverside, California. He died of cancer complications on May 1, 1981, in Rancho Bernardo, San Diego, California, aged 75.

== Partial filmography ==
- Tahiti Honey (1943)
- Call of the South Seas (1944)
- The Lady and the Monster (1944)
- A Thousand and One Nights (1945)
- She Wouldn't Say Yes (1945)
- Rough, Tough and Ready (1945)
- Over 21 (1945)
- Gilda (1946)
- The Walls Came Tumbling Down (1946)
- Gallant Journey (1946)
- Dead Reckoning (1947)
- The Doolins of Oklahoma (1949) (uncredited)
- The Boy from Indiana (1950)
- Flat Top (1952)
- Fort Osage (1952)
- The Rose Bowl Story (1952)
- Aladdin and His Lamp (1952)
- Rodeo (1952)
- Wild Stallion (1952)
- Wagons West (1952)
- The Maze (1953)
- Pride of the Blue Grass (1954)
- Sudden Danger (1955)
- Canyon River (1956)
- The Young Guns (1956)
- Calling Homicide (1956)
- My Gun Is Quick (1957)
- The Disembodied (1957)
- Man from God's Country (1958)
- In the Money (1958)
- The Beast of Budapest (1958)
- Cole Younger, Gunfighter (1958)
- Quantrill's Raiders (1958)
- Fort Massacre (1958)
- Queen of Outer Space (1958)
- Joey Ride (1958)
- King of the Wild Stallions (1959)
- The Hypnotic Eye (1960)
- The Deadly Companions (1961)
- Gunfight at Comanche Creek (1963)
- The Crawling Hand (1963) (uncredited)
- The Strangler (1964)
- The Shepherd of the Hills (1964)
- Indian Paint (1965)
- Space Probe Taurus (1965 - as Marlin Skyles)
- The Violent Ones (1967)
- Dayton's Devils (1968)
- The Resurrection of Zachary Wheeler (1971)

== Bibliography ==
- Alan Gevinson. Within Our Gates: Ethnicity in American Feature Films, 1911-1960. University of California Press, 1997.
