= Leo the Lion (MGM) =

Mascot of Metro-Goldwyn-Mayer

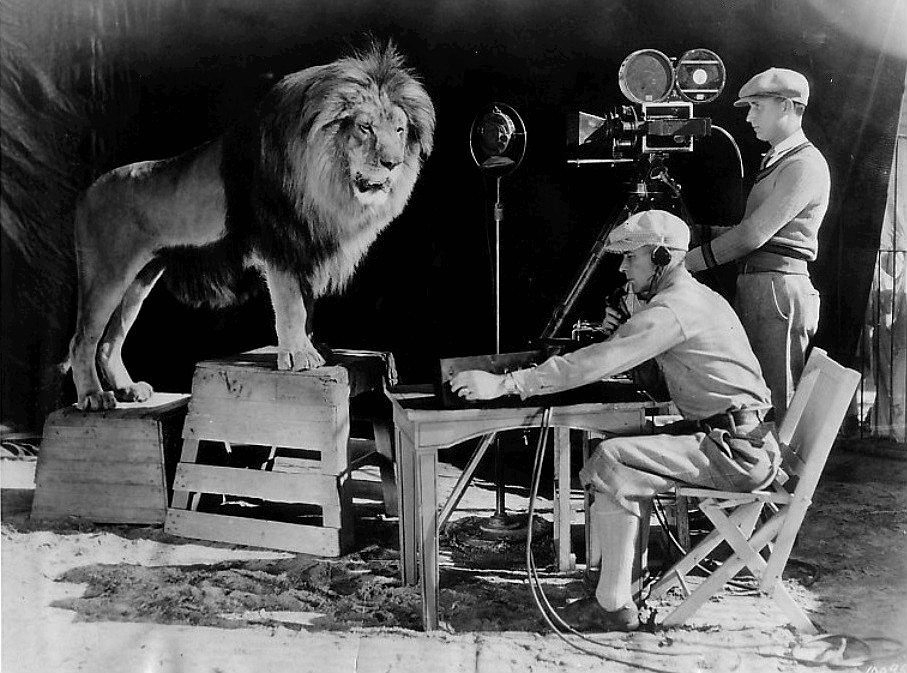
- Jackie, the second MGM lion, in studio in 1928
- Metro-Goldwyn-Mayer (Amazon MGM Studios)
- Appointer: Goldwyn Pictures (1916–1924); Metro-Goldwyn-Mayer (1924–present)
- Formation: 1916; 110 years ago
- First holder: Slats (1917/1924–1928)
- Final holder: Zamba (1957–2021)

Leo the Lion is the mascot for the Hollywood film studio Metro-Goldwyn-Mayer; its former sister company MGM Resorts; and its predecessor Goldwyn Pictures, featured in the studio's production logo, which was created by the Paramount Studios art director Lionel S. Reiss.

From 1916, through the time the studio was formed by the merger of Samuel Goldwyn's studio with Marcus Loew's Metro Pictures and Louis B. Mayer's company in 1924, to 2021, there have been eight different lions used for the MGM logo. (Note: It is sometimes counted as five, but the following source disregards Numa, Telly, and Coffee.) In 2021, MGM introduced a new CGI logo which features a lion mostly based on Zamba, the final live-action lion.

With a few exceptions, the majority of the logos show the roaring lion encircled by a filmstrip, which extends sideways. The words "Trade" and "Mark" are displayed on each side, and a portion of the filmstrip contains the motto "Ars Gratia Artis" (art for art's sake) displayed on top of the lion. Below the lion is a comedy mask, which itself is surrounded by wreaths. The name "Metro Goldwyn Mayer" (or before the merger, "A Goldwyn Picture") is displayed above the filmstrip, though until 1954, it was displayed within a marquee located below the mask and wreaths.

== History ==
=== Goldwyn Pictures logos (1916–1924) ===
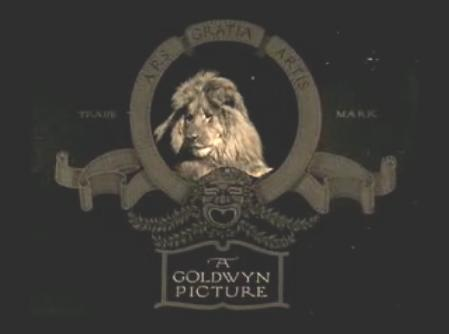
One of the lions used by Goldwyn Pictures, seen in Polly of the Circus (1917) and The Ace of Hearts (1921).

In 1916, publicist Howard Dietz chose the lion as the Goldwyn Pictures mascot as a tribute to his alma mater Columbia University, whose mascot is a lion. Dietz was directly inspired by the university's fight song, "Roar, Lion, Roar".

Two known logos of the Goldwyn Pictures had a live-action lion: the first one can be seen in Polly of the Circus (the first Goldwyn Picture, released in 1917) and The Ace of Hearts (1921), and the second one, wherein the lion briefly roars, can be seen in Souls for Sale (1923) and Wild Oranges (1924).

There is also a logo showing a painting of a lion (rather than live-action) that can be viewed in What Happened to Rosa (1920). Unlike the live-action logos, this had the name "A Goldwyn Picture" displayed above the filmstrip, rather than being within a marquee below the mask and wreath, a design format that was repeated since 1953, decades after Goldwyn merged with Metro and Louis B. Mayer Pictures to form MGM.

=== Slats (1917, 1924–1928) ===
Slats, trained by Volney Phifer, was the first lion used in the branding of the newly formed studio. Born at Dublin Zoo on March 20, 1919, and originally named Cairbre (Irish for 'charioteer'), Slats was used on all black-and-white MGM films between 1924 and 1928. The first MGM film that used the logo was He Who Gets Slapped (1924). However, Slats has also been referred to as the lion in the Goldwyn Pictures logo.

Unlike his successors, Slats did nothing but look around in the logo, making him the only MGM lion not to roar. However, it is rumored that Phifer trained the lion to growl on cue, despite the fact that synchronized sound would not be used in motion pictures until 1927.

Slats died in 1936 at age 17. At that time, Phifer retired to his farm in Gillette, New Jersey, where he kept other animals used on Broadway. Upon the lion's death, Phifer buried Slats on his farm and placed a plain block of granite to mark the grave. Later, Phifer replaced the granite block with a pine tree planted directly above the grave so that the roots would "hold down the lion's spirit".

=== Numa (1927–1928) ===
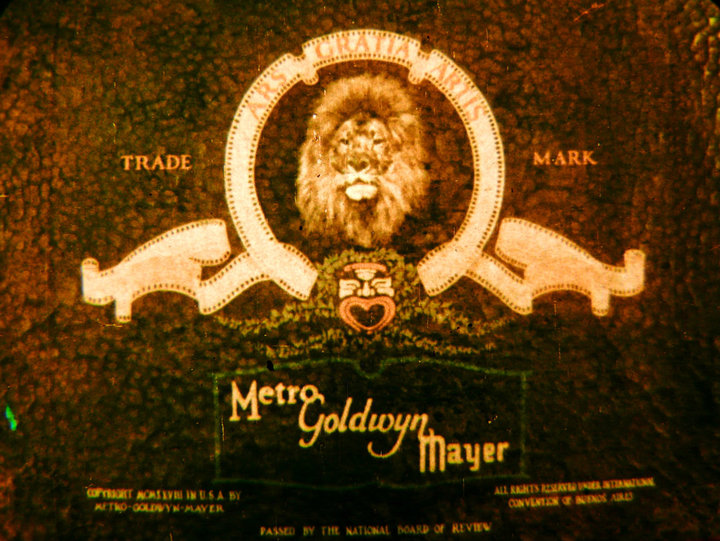
Numa (Bill), taken from Buffalo Bill's Last Fight

Metro-Goldwyn-Mayer began experiments with two-strip color short subjects in 1927 and animated cartoons in 1930. For these productions, three different lions were used.

Footage of the first lion, Numa, is widely inaccessible, although a few frames of the logo with this lion exist in the silent color films Buffalo Bill's Last Fight (1927, earning Numa the nickname "Bill") and The Heart of General Robert E. Lee (1928).

=== Jackie (1928–1956) ===
Jackie, used from 1928 to 1956

Jackie was the second lion used for the MGM logo and the first MGM lion to audibly roar. Born around 1915, he was a wild lion cub brought from the Nubian Desert in Sudan, and trained by Mel Koontz. Jackie roared/growled three times before looking off to the right of the screen; From 1928 to around 1933, there was a slightly extended version wherein, after looking off to the right, the lion would return his gaze to the front a few seconds later. The roar was recorded long after Jackie was filmed, and at least four different recordings of roars/growls were used, first heard via a gramophone record for MGM's first production with sound, White Shadows in the South Seas (1928). Jackie appeared in all black-and-white MGM films from 1928 to 1956 (replacing Slats), as well as the sepia-tinted opening credits of The Wizard of Oz (1939). He also appeared in MGM's black-and-white cartoons, such as the Flip the Frog and Willie Whopper series produced for MGM by the short-lived Iwerks Studio, as well as the Captain and the Kids cartoons produced by MGM in 1938 and 1939. A colorized variation of the logo can be found on the colorized version of Babes in Toyland (1934), also known as March of the Wooden Soldiers; an animated version created using rotoscoping appeared on the 1939 Captain and the Kids and Count Screwloose cartoon Petunia Natural Park. For the films Westward the Women and The Next Voice You Hear... (both 1950), a still frame of the logo—sans growling—was used at the beginning. Jackie would make his last film appearance at the beginning of the film Hearts of the West (1975).

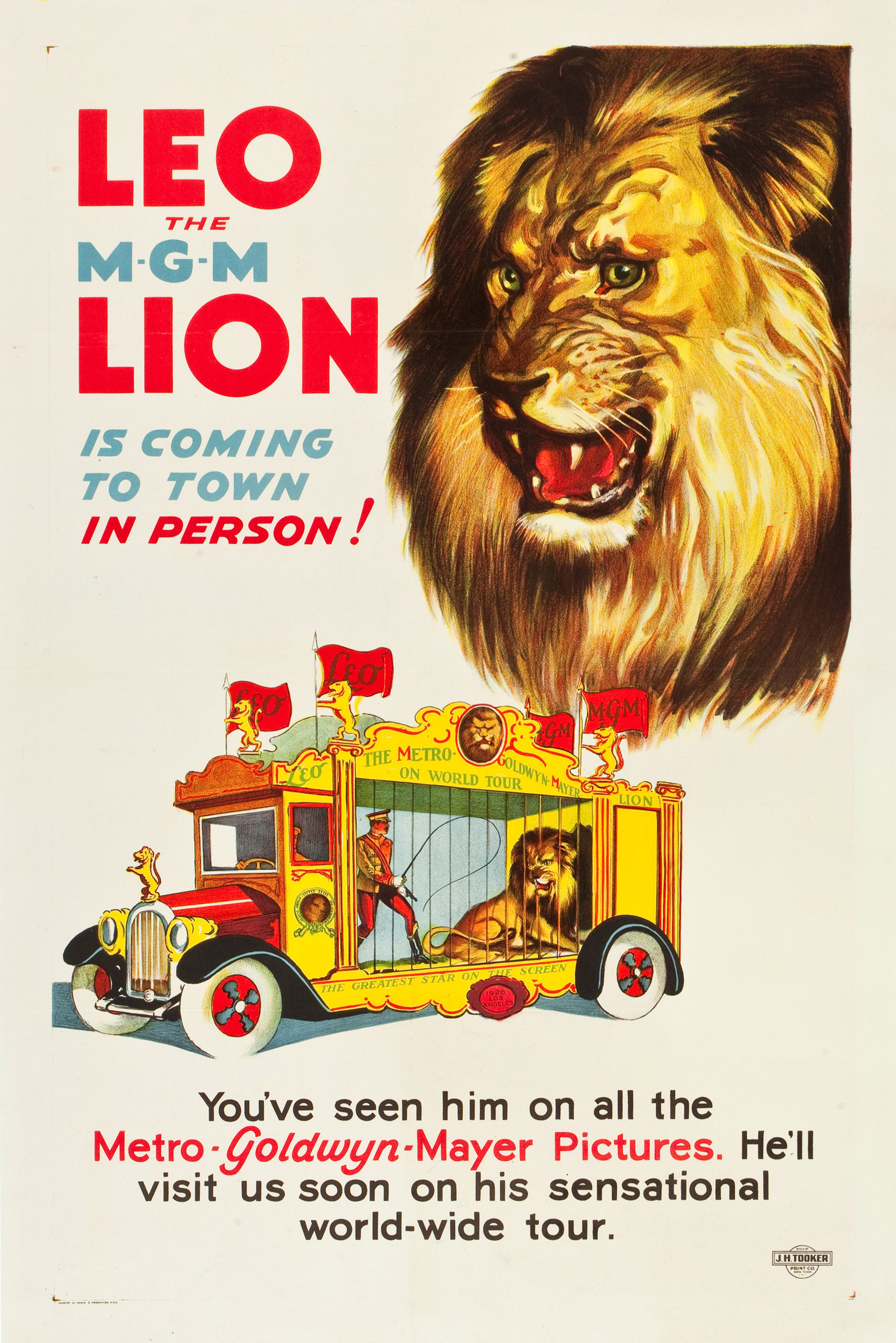
1928 poster promoting a traveling tour of Jackie

In addition to appearing in the MGM logo, Jackie appeared in over a hundred films, including the Tarzan film series that starred Johnny Weissmuller. Jackie also appeared with an apprehensive Greta Garbo in a well-known 1926 publicity still. A short 1933 film of a very annoyed Jackie receiving a bath from trainer Mel Koontz also exists. The lion is also known for surviving several accidents, including two train wrecks, a sinking ship, an earthquake, and an explosion in the studio. The most notable accident was a plane crash. On September 16, 1927, Martin "Marty" Jensen was hired to take Jackie cross-country. The airplane was a B-1 Brougham airplane, a modified version of Charles Lindbergh's Spirit of St. Louis. Installed behind the pilot's seat was a glass-enclosed iron bar cage. The plane took off from Camp Kearny Airfield, near San Diego. However, the plane was overweight because Jackie weighed 350 pounds. The excessive weight caused the plane to crash in the mountains of northern Arizona. Both Jensen and Jackie survived the crash and subsisted on milk, water, and sandwiches that were on board the plane. After being rescued, a thin and weak Jackie was returned to MGM's handlers and was well cared for the rest of his life. Due to surviving these accidents, Jackie received the nickname "Leo the Lucky".

In the early 1930s, MGM reissued some of its earlier, pre-1928 silent films with prerecorded music soundtracks and sounds; such films included Greed (1924), Ben-Hur (1925), Flesh and the Devil (1926), and The Unknown (1927). For these sound reissues, the original Slats logo was replaced with Jackie.

In 1931, Jackie went on a farewell tour and subsequently retired to the Philadelphia Zoo. On February 25, 1935, the lion was found dead by his zookeeper, John McCullen. The cause of his death was attributed to heart issues. Jackie's body was flown from Philadelphia to Los Angeles, where taxidermist Thomas Hodges preserved his skin into a rug. Francis Vaniman bought the rug and put it on display along with other animal skins on the third floor of his house in McPherson, Kansas, which later became the "African Room" in the McPherson Museum.

=== Telly (1928–1932) ===
The second lion of the two-strip color short subjects, Telly, appeared in color MGM movies between 1928 and 1932. An extended version of the logo featuring Telly appears at the beginning of the film The Viking (1928), featuring the lion having the same roar as Jackie. In current prints of The Mysterious Island (1929), Telly appears in black and white because the color version is lost.

=== Coffee (1932–1935) ===
The third lion of the two-strip color short subjects, Coffee, appeared on color films between 1932 and 1934 or 1935 for the Happy Harmonies shorts, until production was switched to full three-strip Technicolor filming. The Cat and the Fiddle (1934) had brief color sequences, but was otherwise in black-and-white, including its opening credits, so it used Jackie instead of Coffee. The Cat and the Fiddle however, showed its "The End" title card against a Technicolor background. An extended version of the logo featuring Coffee appears at the beginning of the short Wild People (1932), featuring the lion roaring three times, rather than just twice.

=== Tanner (1934–1956, 1963–1967) ===
In 1934, MGM began producing its first full three-strip Technicolor film, Holland in Tulip Time (1934). Tanner, also trained by Mel Koontz, appeared on all Technicolor MGM films (1934–1956) and cartoons (1935–1958, 1963–1967, except for 1965's The Dot and the Line), replacing Telly and Coffee. The Wizard of Oz (1939) had the Oz scenes in color, but it had the opening credits, closing credits, and the Kansas scenes in sepia-toned black-and-white, so it used Jackie instead of Tanner. Third Dimensional Murder (1941) was shot in 3D and in Technicolor, but it had the opening credits in black-and-white, so it also used Jackie instead of Tanner. The Picture of Dorian Gray (1945) and The Secret Garden (1949) both had brief color sequences, but were otherwise in black-and-white, including their opening credits, so they used Jackie instead of Tanner as well. The Secret Garden, however, showed its "The End" title card and the cast list against a Technicolor background. The Long, Long Trailer (1954) and Forever, Darling (1956) use Tanner with Jackie's roar instead. Tanner roared three times in the logo; an extended version of this logo appeared on the Colortone Musicals shorts The Spectacle Maker and My Grandfather Clock (both 1934), Star Night at the Cocoanut Grove (1934), and several early James A. Fitzpatrick Traveltalks color shorts, with two additional roars from the lion.

Tanner was MGM's third longest-lived lion to be used, for a total of 22 years. His first feature film appearance was in Sweethearts four years later, in 1938. He featured after Jackie, who was used for a total of 28 years, and the current lion, who has been retained for 69 years. It is this version of the logo that was the most frequently used version throughout the Golden Age of Hollywood, although color did not really become the norm until the 1960s, and even then, many movies were still being made in black-and-white.

In addition to being used as MGM's lion mascot, Tanner also made an appearance before the film Countdown for Zorro (1936), Three Stooges shorts Movie Maniacs (1936), Wee Wee Monsieur (1938), Three Missing Links (1938), You Nazty Spy (1940) and Hold That Lion! (1947). Also, between the mid-1940s and 1960s, MGM's cartoon department would use Tanner's roar as a sound effect for many of their animated shorts.

Tanner and Jackie were both kept in the change from Academy ratio films to widescreen CinemaScope movies in 1953, with Tanner for color movies and Jackie for black-and-white films. The logo was modified for this change; the marquee below the filmstrip design was removed, and the company name was thus placed in a semi-circle above the filmstrip.

=== George (1956–1957) ===
George, used from 1956 to 1957

The seventh lion, named George, was introduced in High Society (1956) and appeared more heavily maned than any of the other lions. Though his tenure as an MGM lion was only around one year, there were at least three different variations of the logo with George. His most famous film appearance was The Wings of Eagles (1957). The logo was reused from the Canadian VHS release of Cinema Paradiso (1988) (which was distributed by Alliance Releasing Home Video), while the logo was removed from the U.S. VHS release of Cinema Paradiso (1988) (which was distributed by HBO Video under license from Miramax Films).

=== Zamba (1957–2021) ===
Zamba, the eighth lion, is by far MGM's longest-used, having appeared in most MGM films since 1957. Zamba was born in the Royal Burgers Zoo in Arnhem, the Netherlands. He was also the youngest at the time MGM filmed him roaring, hence his much smaller mane. His first appearance was in the 1957 film Tip on a Dead Jockey.

Zamba was purchased from animal dealer Henry Trefflich and trained by Ralph Helfer. In addition to being used as the MGM lion, Zamba also appeared in other productions such as the religious epic King of Kings (1961), The Lion (1962), Zebra in the Kitchen (1965), Fluffy (1965), and Napoleon and Samantha (1972); as well as a memorable television commercial for Dreyfus Investments in 1961. Zamba also made several appearances on the 1971–72 television series The Pet Set, proving himself gentle enough to let a blind teenage girl pet him in one episode.

==== 1957–1984 ====
Two different versions of this logo were used: an "extended" version, with the lion roaring three times, used from 1957 to 1960, and the "standard" version, with the lion roaring twice, used since 1960. In the Chuck Jones-directed Tom and Jerry cartoons released by MGM Animation/Visual Arts between 1963 and 1967 (as with cartoons from the same series made between 1957 and 1958), Tanner was used in the opening sequence instead of Zamba, albeit using Zamba's roar. Three MGM films, Raintree County (1957), Ben-Hur (1959) and Mutiny on the Bounty (1962) utilized a still-frame variation of this logo; Raintree County and Mutiny on the Bounty also had the lion's roar played along with their opening scores. For Ben-Hur, the film's director, William Wyler, thought the roar would feel out of place for the opening nativity scene. This logo also appeared on black-and-white films, such as Jailhouse Rock (1957) and A Patch of Blue (1965). Some television prints of the 1943 film Cabin in the Sky have replaced the Jackie logo with Zamba for unknown reasons.

The logo was modified for MGM's 50th anniversary in 1974. The usual filmstrip appeared on screen with the phrase "BEGINNING OUR NEXT 50 YEARS..." on a black background within the film circle; the phrase dissolves as "Metro-Goldwyn-Mayer" (above the filmstrip) and "GOLDEN ANNIVERSARY" (in place of the usual "TRADE MARK") both rendered in gold fade in along with Zamba, who roars twice. This logo appeared on most MGM films released during 1974–75.

The logo was retained in the corporate revamp following MGM's acquisition of United Artists in 1981. The logo now read "MGM/UA Entertainment Co."; this logo would appear on all MGM/UA films from 1983 until 1986 and again in 1987 on the film O.C. and Stiggs, which was originally produced in 1985. It was also at this time that the original lion roar sound, which actually sampled Tanner's roar, was replaced with a remade stereophonic one, redone by Mark Mangini. This later version featured tiger sounds; as Mangini would later explain, "Lions don't make that kind of ferocious noises, and the logo needed to be ferocious and majestic.". The first film to use the new roar sound was Poltergeist (1982). Incidentally, the sound effect was also used for the "door ghost" near the end of the film.

==== 1984–2008 ====
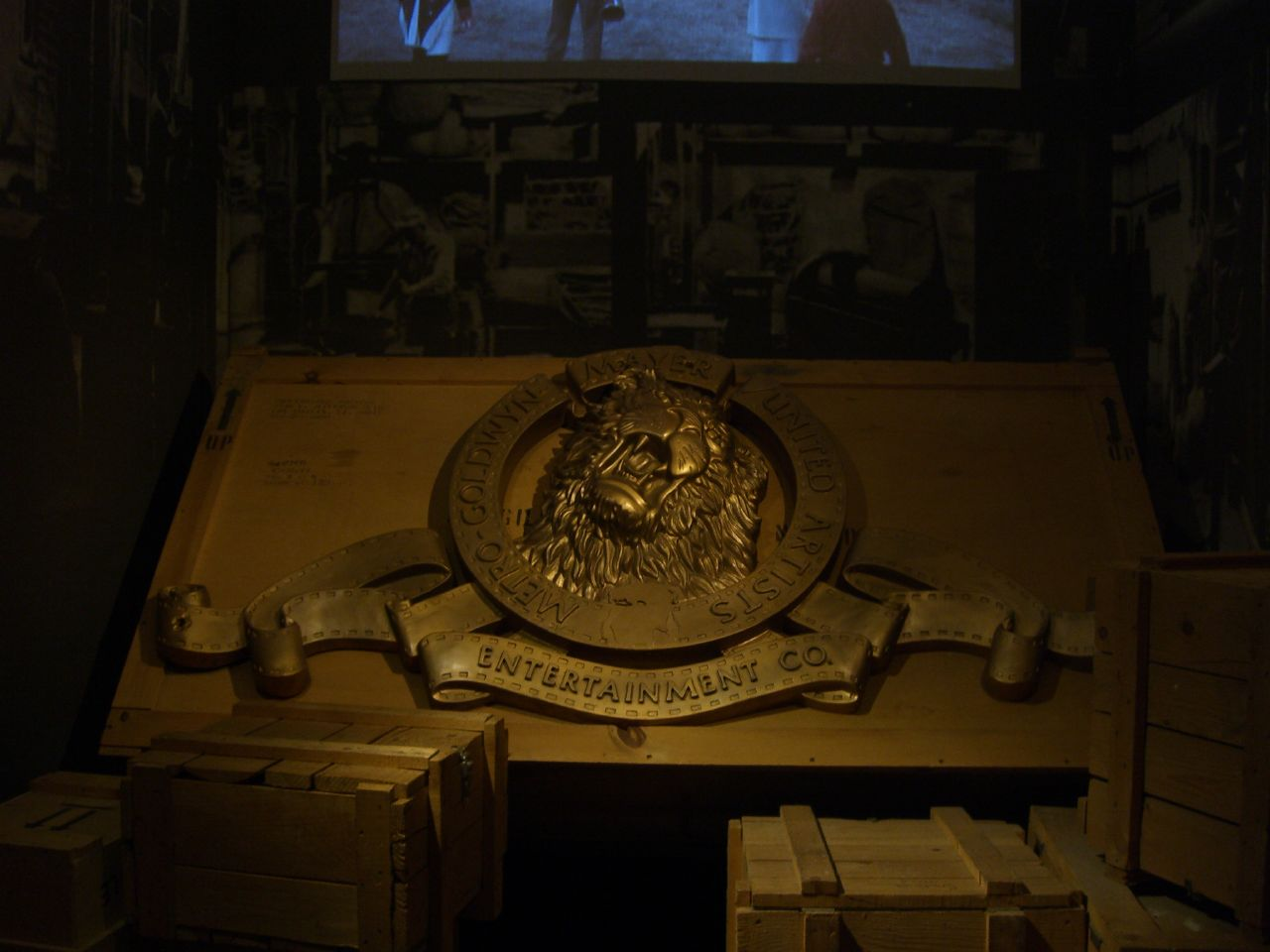
A sculpture of the MGM/UA-era Diamond Jubilee logo, albeit lacking the words "Diamond Jubilee" and the mask between "METRO" and "ARTISTS".

From 1984 to 1985, MGM used a variation of its main studio logo for its 60th anniversary based on the print logo, with the filmstrip in a golden color. Above the filmstrip were the words "Diamond Jubilee", replacing the standard company name; its font color was silver, and below the filmstrip was the phrase "Sixty Years of Great Entertainment". The "Ars Gratia Artis" motto was removed from inside the circle and replaced with the text "Metro-Goldwyn-Mayer/United Artists". The drama mask from the bottom had its surrounding laurels removed, and the mask itself was moved up a little so that an additional golden filmstrip with the text reading "Entertainment Co." below would be added. Although Mangini's new roar effect was primarily used at the time, 2010: The Year We Make Contact mixed both the original and 1982 roar effects.

When the company began using MGM and UA as separate brands in 1986, a new logo for MGM was introduced; the same gold filmstrip used for the "Diamond Jubilee" variant was retained, and the text was redone in exactly the same color. The following year, a new "MGM/UA Communications Co." logo was introduced, and it would precede both the MGM and UA logos until it was dropped in 1990. However, both logos would maintain the byline "An MGM/UA Communications Company" until 1992. Mangini remixed the 1982 roar in 1995, using digital audio technology to blend it in with several other roar sounds; the remixed sound effect debuted with the release of Cutthroat Island (1995). This was done to give the roar more "muscle," which an MGM executive reportedly had found the iconic sound to be lacking beforehand, as well as to fit it into films with 5.1 surround sound. In 2001, MGM's website address, "www.mgm.com", was added to the bottom of the logo as the unit would be also developing entertainment for the web.

==== 2008–2012: Digital Restoration ====
The logo was revised again in 2008, with the filmstrip, text, and drama mask done in a more brilliant gold color. Also, Zamba's image was digitally restored and enhanced, thanks to the work of staff at Pacific Title: first off, a three-dimensional model of Leo's mane was designed, and then composited and blended onto the lion's actual mane; secondly, the tips of the lion's ears were digitally remodeled, so that the tip of his left ear would now cross in front of the filmstrip, in an effort to give the logo more depth. For the restoration process, the extended "three-roar" version of Zamba's footage was used, sourced from the master negative print of 1958's Cat on a Hot Tin Roof, as the original, raw footage of the lion, which was originally going to be used for the restoration, could not be located. For MGM's upcoming feature films, it would have to be shortened to show the lion roaring just twice. The new logo's design was based on that of MGM's then-current print logo, which had been introduced in 1992. The website address was also shortened to "MGM.COM". The lion's roar was remixed once again by sound editor Eric Martel, maintaining most of the original 1982 sound elements. The newly done logo debuted with the release of the James Bond film Quantum of Solace. However, beginning with The Taking of Pelham 123 (2009), the 1995 roar was reused.

After its disuse in 2012, the first roar from the unused three-roar version was first heard theatrically in Project Hail Mary (2026), whose visuals are based on the 1957 version, though with the "An Amazon Company" byline.

==== 2012–2021: 3D Zoom Out ====
In 2012, Shine Studio was chosen to redesign and animate the logo in stereoscopic 3D (three-dimensional). A lion's eye irises in and zooms out to reveal Leo the Lion encircled in a digital moving golden filmstrip. Shine rebuilt all the elements of the logo in 3D and then placed them on different planes to add dimensional layers and drama, including the words "Ars Gratia Artis" moving from right to left. The 1995 roar and the digitally restored and enhanced 1957 footage are reused once again as Leo roars and the company name is brought in from above to center the top screen, which completes the logo sequence. MGM's website address was removed, as MGM is no longer, as of 2012, a self-distribution entity, but rather a production company. This logo was first used in the 2012 James Bond film Skyfall.

=== CGI Animation (2021–present) ===
On March 8, 2021, MGM unveiled an updated logo, with Leo now being CGI-animated, based on the Zamba footage, the first major redesign for the mascot in over six decades. The latest rendition leans into the company's traditional gold design, filtering out sepia tones and modernizing the logo by sharpening the film roll, mask, and lettering. The biggest change is evident in the brand's new monogram, which uses the classic font of the MGM logo rather than the blocky lettering associated with MGM Resorts. Furthermore, the motto now shows its English translation, "Art for Art's Sake", then changes to its original Latin motto. It also had a proper fanfare composed by Sounds Red, alongside the reused 1995 roar. MGM worked with Culver City, California-based Baked Studios on the new look.

While the new logo, similar to the previous logos, was set to be unveiled with the James Bond film No Time to Die, it was frequently delayed over two years from its intended November 2019 release to October 2021 due to the ongoing COVID-19 pandemic. It instead debuted with the Aretha Franklin biopic Respect, which was released on August 13, 2021. On January 19, 2022, a special variation was released to coincide with the 60th anniversary of the James Bond franchise, with the logo zooming out further to make room for the "60 Years of Bond" logo which appears on the right next to it. It premiered in front of the IMAX re-release engagement of No Time to Die on January 21, 2022, and appeared on Ron Howard's Thirteen Lives and the documentary The Sound of 007.

In September 2023, following Amazon's acquisition of the studio the year before, a byline reading "An Amazon Company" (in the Amazon Ember font) was added below the logo, debuting with the teaser trailer for Saltburn and officially on the Prime Video exclusive Sitting in Bars with Cake. This version of the logo is also being used to represent Amazon MGM Studios at the start of films produced by the parent company after retiring their 2016–2023 on-screen logo as a result of their rebrand. In March 2024, a "100 Years of Entertainment" logo variant was released to commemorate the centennial anniversary of MGM's founding in 1924. This variant debuted with the Prime Video release of the remake of Road House (2024) and appeared in front of every film produced by Amazon MGM throughout the year until May 2025, before reverting to the standard version in that month.

=== Stylized Lion (1968) ===
MGM's "Stylized Lion" logo.

In 1965, in an attempt to update its image, MGM recruited Lippincott to create a more contemporary logo. The result, a circular still graphic of a lion known as "The Stylized Lion", appeared at the beginning of two films in 1968: 2001: A Space Odyssey and The Subject Was Roses. Afterwards, Leo was reinstated for the opening logo.

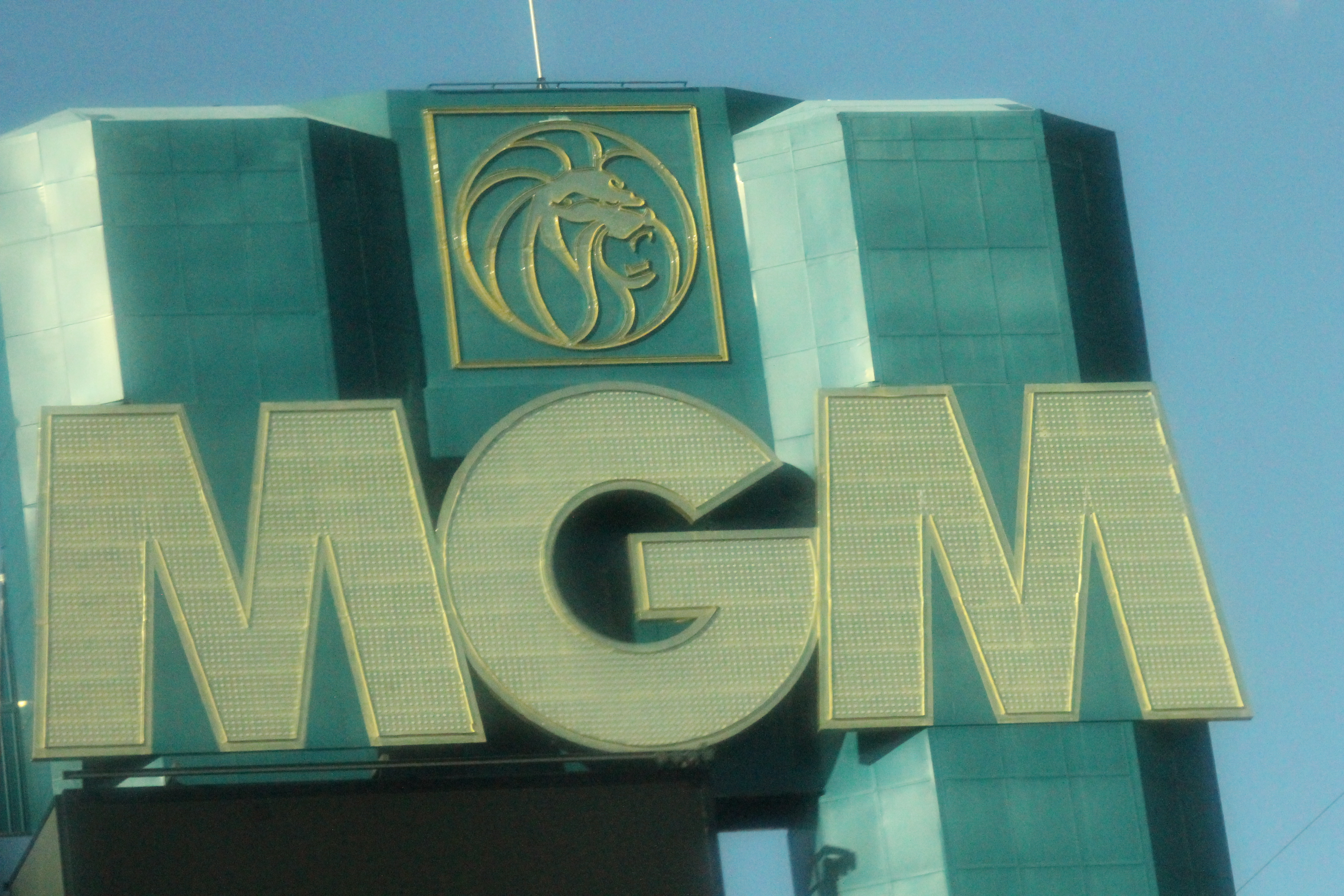
The revised stylized lion as seen on the MGM Grand Las Vegas sign.

The Stylized Lion, however, was retained by the studio as its print logo, used on theatrical posters and by the MGM Records division studio advertising, in addition to being shown at the end of credit rolls following most MGM movie releases of this period, continuing until 1982. It was later used by the MGM Grand casinos. A refined version of it is used as the logo for their parent company, MGM Resorts International.

=== Secondary MGM logo (1924–1984) ===
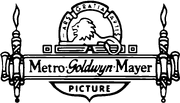
The secondary MGM logo, used from 1924 to 1984.

MGM also used a secondary logo, seen in the opening and closing credits of most classic MGM movies. This design originated as the Metro-Goldwyn Pictures logo from 1923 to 1925. The logo features a graphic of a reclining lion (from a side view) on a pedestal that has the text "A Metro-Goldwyn-Mayer Picture" on a banner below it. Behind the lion is a semi-circular filmstrip with the "Ars Gratia Artis" motto ("Art for art's sake"), much like the filmstrip of the company's primary logo. On either side of the pedestal are torches. This secondary logo was used in the opening title and end titles of most MGM films from the mid-1920s until the early 1960s, then moved to the main film credits until 1984. This logo was last seen in the 1994 film That's Entertainment! III.

Many of the short subjects produced by Hal Roach studios during the late 1920s and 1930s, such as Our Gang and Laurel and Hardy, featured a variation of the secondary logo in their closing titles. This variation had a lion cub on the pedestal, looking straight at the viewer.

In addition, several MGM films made in the late 1930s and early 1940s set their entire opening credits against a background of a relief carving of an outline of the reclining lion image, similar to the one seen on the secondary logo. Among the many films with the reclining lion credits sequence are Ninotchka (1939), starring Greta Garbo, The Shop Around the Corner (1940) with James Stewart, and This Man's Navy (1945) starring Wallace Beery. This reclining lion image was later used as the logo for MGM Television in the late 1950s.

== Puppet ==
Little Leo the Lion, "son of" the "real" Leo, appears as an elaborate hand puppet on MGM Parade, a 1955–1956 television show. In the second episode, he reclines on a bookcase in the "MGM Trophy Room" set, wearing full evening dress (but no shoes). Leo interrupts host George Murphy to speak for all the cartoon animals who want to appear on MGM Parade. He introduces the animals' pitch reel, a 7-minute Tex Avery cartoon. Leo promises more acts for next week, but Murphy replies with a variation on the cliché, "Don't call me, I'll call you."

== Logo variations and self-parodies ==
MGM made their first of several spoofs of their own logo for the first Marx Brothers MGM film, A Night at the Opera (1935). Jackie appears in the opening credits for the actual film, but the trailer for the film shows a lion that appears to be Tanner, followed by Groucho, then Chico, roaring inside of the film circle, with the sound of the actual lion being heard and then Harpo doing the same, but silently. (Harpo then honks his horn instead of roaring again.)

In the Tom and Jerry cartoon Switchin' Kitten (1961), Jerry roars like Leo in his mouse hole that resembles the filmstrip of the MGM logo (in gold). In addition, the Chuck Jones-directed Tom and Jerry cartoons from 1963 to 1967 begin with a cartoon variation of the MGM logo using Tanner instead of Leo. Tanner from the early Tom and Jerry cartoon intros from MGM roars at the beginning, and is then replaced by Tom, who yowls and hisses; the logo then transitions to the cartoon series' title sequence. Also, in the episode "Sorry Safari", there is a lion in the jungle sitting down roaring while the company's name is at the top of the screen. The same lion appears later in the episode.

The Big Parade of Comedy (1964), a retrospective of MGM comedy films, opens with Leo roaring while "out to lunch" behind a pulled-down shade, with an animated protestor in his mouth.

Another spoof MGM used for its own logo appeared in Roman Polanski's 1967 film, The Fearless Vampire Killers. Here, the lion morphs into a creepy-looking cartoon vampire with blood dripping from its mouth; in the European version, after a short introductory cartoon, Leo zooms in and roars as the cartoon's two main characters cower in fear, then grows saber-teeth (like the extinct cat Smilodon) as they run off.

In the opening of the 1981 remake of Tarzan, the Ape Man, Leo does the iconic Tarzan yell by Johnny Weissmuller, heard in previous MGM Tarzan films. The 1983 comedy film Strange Brew starring Bob and Doug Mackenzie of SCTV opens with a one-off version of the MGM logo where the lion belches within one second of the fade-in. Then the lion belches, and the camera begins a sweeping dolly move to the right and then the rear of the logo. Behind the logo, Rick Moranis and Dave Thomas as Bob and Doug McKenzie are trying to goad the lethargic lion into roaring by "cranking his tail"; then, in a breaking of the fourth wall, they both notice the camera and run to their Great White North set to begin the movie. The lion also growls during the scene (The 1981 roar was reused).

In Josie and the Pussycats (2001), Leo roars until he's morphed into a screaming teenage girl.

In The Crocodile Hunter: Collision Course (2002), Leo is replaced with a saltwater crocodile. A trailer for the film features a lion different from the standard lion; Steve Irwin also appears and breaks the fourth wall by briefly addressing the viewers.

In The Pink Panther (2006), starring Steve Martin, Leo starts roaring, but is then interrupted as Inspector Clouseau opens the circle like a door, looking around the place before leaving. The Pink Panther character appears behind him unnoticed, cleverly smirking, and closes the door immediately afterwards, leaving Leo very confused.

In RoboCop (2014), the lion's roars are replaced with talk show host Pat Novak (Samuel L. Jackson) doing his vocal warm-up exercises.

In The Addams Family (2019), Leo roars until a flash of light turns him into Kitty Cat, who finds a red ball and jumps out of the logo to go play with it as the logo falls over, shown as a cardboard cutout.

In The Wizard of Oz at Sphere (2025), an immersive 4D version of MGM's own 1939 film created specifically to screen at Sphere in the Las Vegas Valley, opens with the Cowardly Lion (Bert Lahr) taking Leo's place inside the filmstrip circle.

In Merv (2025), the MGM lion is replaced with Merv the dog with barks.

In Project Hail Mary, the 1957 MGM logo appears twice as the opening and closing logo. The opening features Leo roaring with different sounds, starting with the unreleased first roar from the 2008 MGM roar track, followed by a beeping noise during the second roar. And unlike the original 1957 MGM logo, Leo roars during the first two sequences instead of three, after his third roar is blacked out, in addition to containing no roar track. The closing animated astronaut patch version replaces Leo's roar with Rocky's voice.

In The Sheep Detectives, the MGM lion's roar is replaced by a sheep's bleat.

In Masters of the Universe (2026), the MGM lion is replaced by Cringer the talking green tiger.

== Other parodies ==
Monty Python's film And Now for Something Completely Different (1971) parodied MGM's logo with a croaking frog in place of the lion. The Goodies episodes "Gender Education" and "The Movies" parodied the logo with a blanket-obscured man and a chicken respectively taking the lion's place.

In an episode of Sidekick called "Trevor the Hero", the title card has Eric as the drama mask and Trevor in the logo acting like the MGM Lion.

The Steven Universe episode "Lion 2: the Movie" ends with Steven's pet lion, Lion, appearing in a spoof of the MGM logo. MGM parodied its logo in several of its cartoons.

In the 1933 Looney Tunes cartoon Bosko's Picture Show, the feature film shown in Bosko's theater is produced by the "TNT Pictures" company, whose logo is a roaring and burping lion with the motto Eenie Meanie Minie Moe. Other Warner Bros. cartoons, such as She Was an Acrobat's Daughter and Bacall to Arms also poke fun at their cross-town rival studio. (Ironically, MGM would obtain the rights to these two cartoons in 1981 through United Artists and UA's purchase of Associated Artists Productions and its library in 1958, which included all pre-August 1948 color Looney Tunes/Merrie Melodies.)

The Soviet animated film Ograblenie po... (1978/1988) parodied the logo with Cheburashka replacing the lion.

The animated television series Tiny Toon Adventures included "end tags" for several of its main characters – short clips featuring the character(s) that were played immediately after the end credits. One of the end tags and post-credit scenes featured the character Furrball, who began by roaring at the screen like a lion before covering his mouth and letting out an apologetic mew.

The Muppets parodied the logo in two of their productions in 1981. It was spoofed by Animal in the role of Leo in The Great Muppet Caper, and by Fozzie Bear in the same role in The Muppets Go to the Movies. Also, in one Muppet Babies episode ("The Daily Muppet," which first aired on CBS Saturday, November 1, 1986), Baby Animal roars as Gonzo's face replaces the mask usually seen under the lion.

One of the episode title cards for the animated PBS series, Arthur (the episode "Sue Ellen Moves In") involves Buster walking into the circle and roaring like the MGM lion (subsequent episodes with the title card would feature Buster making other noises such as an elephant trumpeting or simply belching). The titular character then walks up behind him and laughs.

The Pokémon anime featured a Zorua, a Meowth and a Pikachu parodying Leo.

In the 1997 Warner Bros./Turner Pictures/Turner Feature Animation feature film Cats Don't Dance, the story takes place at Mammoth Pictures in Hollywood. Mammoth's logo is also a spoof of MGM's, with a trumpeting elephant seen in the filmstrip circle and a Latin motto in the filmstrip above the elephant's head reading, "Optimum Est Maximum," which translates to "Bigger is better."

In the Season 8 episode "Jaga Dan Hargai Mata" (Take Care and Value Your Eyes) of the Malaysian cartoon Upin & Ipin, the titular characters imagine their older sister Ros (Note: whom they refer to as "Kak Ros" (Kak is the Malay for older sister)) roaring in a parody of the MGM logo. The filmstrip is simplified; the "Metro Goldwyn Mayer" text is replaced with "Kak Ros Yang Garang" (Older Sister Ros who is fierce), "Trade" with Sejak (since), "Mark" with Dulu (before), and the mask is replaced with an illustration of Leo.

== See also ==
- Metro-Goldwyn-Mayer
- Metro-Goldwyn-Mayer Television
- Metro-Goldwyn-Mayer cartoon studio
- The Lionhearts
- Art for art's sake
- Amazon MGM Studios
- Lists of Metro-Goldwyn-Mayer films
- List of Amazon MGM Studios films
