= Booty and the Beast =

1953 film by Jules White

- Directed by: Jules White
- Screenplay by: Jack White
- Story by: Felix Adler
- Produced by: Jules White
- Starring: Moe Howard; Larry Fine; Shemp Howard; Kenneth MacDonald; Vernon Dent; Heinie Conklin; Dudley Dickerson; Curly Howard; Blackie Whiteford
- Edited by: Edwin H. Bryant
- Distributed by: Columbia Pictures
- Release date: March 5, 1953 (U.S.)
- Running time: 15:55
- Country: United States
- Language: English

Booty and the Beast is a 1953 short subject directed by Jules White starring American slapstick comedy team The Three Stooges (Moe Howard, Larry Fine and Shemp Howard). It is the 145th entry in the series released by Columbia Pictures starring the comedians, who released 190 shorts for the studio between 1934 and 1959.

== Plot ==
Inadvertently entangled in aiding a safe-cracker, the Stooges find themselves implicated in a criminal endeavor, prompting their subsequent pursuit of the perpetrator to Las Vegas.

Embarking on a journey fraught with mishaps, the trio's endeavor is further complicated by the accidental release of a lion from the train's baggage car. Despite these challenges, the Stooges persist in their pursuit, ultimately apprehending the unnamed culprit and recovering the ill-gotten gains.

== Cast ==
=== Credited ===
- Moe Howard as Moe
- Larry Fine as Larry
- Shemp Howard as Shemp
- Kenneth McDonald as Crook
- Vernon Dent as Night Watchman

=== Uncredited ===
- Dudley Dickerson as Pullman Porter
- Heinie Conklin as Conductor
- Curly Howard as Sleeping Passenger
- Victor Travers as Passenger with Beard
- Blackie Whiteford as Passenger
- Sam Lufkin as Passenger
- Tanner the Lion as Lion

== Production notes ==
Booty and the Beast was filmed in May 1952. The second half of the film consists of footage recycled from Hold That Lion!, which includes the cameo appearance by former Stooge Curly Howard, who died on January 18, 1952. The title of the film is a parody of the fairy tale Beauty and the Beast.

MacDonald's character in Hold That Lion was originally named Icabod Slipp: in Booty and the Beast, he is a nameless thug. Any references to Slipp are replaced with "He", "Him" or "that crook."
