= Your Best Friend =

Your Best Friend may refer to:

- Your Best Friend (film), a 1922 American silent drama film
- "Your Best Friend" (song), a 2011 song by Mai Kuraki
- "Your Best Friend", a track from the soundtrack of the 2015 video game Undertale by Toby Fox
