= Studio Stoops =

1950 film by Edward Bernds

- Directed by: Edward Bernds
- Written by: Elwood Ullman
- Produced by: Hugh McCollum
- Starring: Moe Howard; Larry Fine; Shemp Howard; Christine McIntyre; Kenneth MacDonald; Vernon Dent; Joe Palma; Ted Stanhope; Chuck Hamilton; Charles Jordan; Stanley Price
- Cinematography: Vincent Farrar
- Edited by: Henry DeMond
- Distributed by: Columbia Pictures
- Release date: October 5, 1950 (U.S.)
- Running time: 16:00
- Country: United States
- Language: English

Studio Stoops is a 1950 short subject directed by Edward Bernds starring American slapstick comedy team The Three Stooges (Moe Howard, Larry Fine and Shemp Howard). It is the 126th entry in the series released by Columbia Pictures starring the comedians, who released 190 shorts for the studio between 1934 and 1959.

== Plot ==
Mistakenly identified as representatives of B.O. Pictures' publicity department, the Stooges, initially enlisted as exterminators, are assigned the responsibility of staging a contrived kidnapping to enhance the studio's publicity campaign featuring the emerging actress, Dolly Devore. However, their plan is intercepted by two gangsters who perpetrate a genuine abduction of Devore from her hotel room. Subsequently, the Stooges find themselves compelled to intervene and rescue Devore from the clutches of the criminals.

In the ensuing rescue attempt, Shemp finds himself perilously stranded on an outdoor ledge while masquerading as Devore inside a garment bag. With Shemp's life hanging in the balance, a tense standoff unfolds as the Stooges and Devore collaborate to fashion a makeshift rope to secure Shemp's safety. Amidst the chaos, a fortuitous mishap occurs when one of the criminals inadvertently becomes entangled in the rope, enabling Devore and Moe to incapacitate the perpetrators.

Simultaneously, Larry endeavors to enlist the assistance of law enforcement authorities, only to encounter skepticism regarding the authenticity of the situation. Undeterred, Larry resorts to unconventional methods, luring the police back to the scene of the crime by provoking a chase. Ultimately, the timely intervention of the police facilitates the apprehension of the criminals and ensures the resolution of the crisis.

Throughout the ordeal, the Stooges navigate a series of precarious situations, including Larry's near-fatal mishap and the subsequent comedic escapades culminating in their unexpected descent into a bathtub filled with water. Despite the tumultuous events, the Stooges emerge relatively unscathed, humorously reflecting on their misadventures as they indulge in a well-deserved moment of respite.

== Cast ==
=== Credited ===
- Moe Howard as Moe
- Larry Fine as Larry
- Shemp Howard as Shemp
- Christine McIntyre as Dolly Devore
- Kenneth MacDonald as Dandy Dawson
- Vernon Dent as Captain Casey

=== Uncredited ===
- Joe Palma as Louie
- Ted Stanhope as J. B. Fletcher
- Charles Jordan as Tiny
- Stanley Price as Brown
- Chuck Hamilton as Policeman

Note: IMDb lists Jean Willes as the woman on the balcony, but it is not Willes, and the role is played by an unidentified actress.

== Production notes ==
Studio Stoops was filmed on February 22–25, 1949, but withheld from release until October 5, 1950, a total of 20 months.

The gag of Shemp hiding in a garment bag in the hotel room closet then managing to get out of the closet was adapted from Buster Keaton's 1941 short film So You Won't Squawk.
