= In Borrowed Plumes =

1926 film

- Directed by: Victor Halperin
- Written by: Leroy Scott
- Produced by: Victor Halperin
- Starring: Marjorie Daw; Niles Welch; Wheeler Oakman
- Production company: Welcome Pictures
- Distributed by: Arrow Film Corporation
- Release date: February 10, 1926
- Running time: 60 minutes
- Country: United States
- Languages: Silent; English intertitles

In Borrowed Plumes is a 1926 American silent drama film directed by Victor Halperin and starring Marjorie Daw, Niles Welch and Wheeler Oakman.

== Cast ==
- Marjorie Daw as Mildred Grantley / Countess D'Autreval
- Niles Welch as Philip Dean
- Wheeler Oakman as Jack Raymond
- Louise Carter as Clara Raymond
- Arnold Daly as Sam Wassup
- Peggy Kelly as Mrs. Harrison
- Dagmar Godowsky as Clarice

== Bibliography ==
- Munden, Kenneth White. The American Film Institute Catalog of Motion Pictures Produced in the United States, Part 1. University of California Press, 1997.
