= Kenneth MacDonald (American actor) =

American actor (1901–1972)

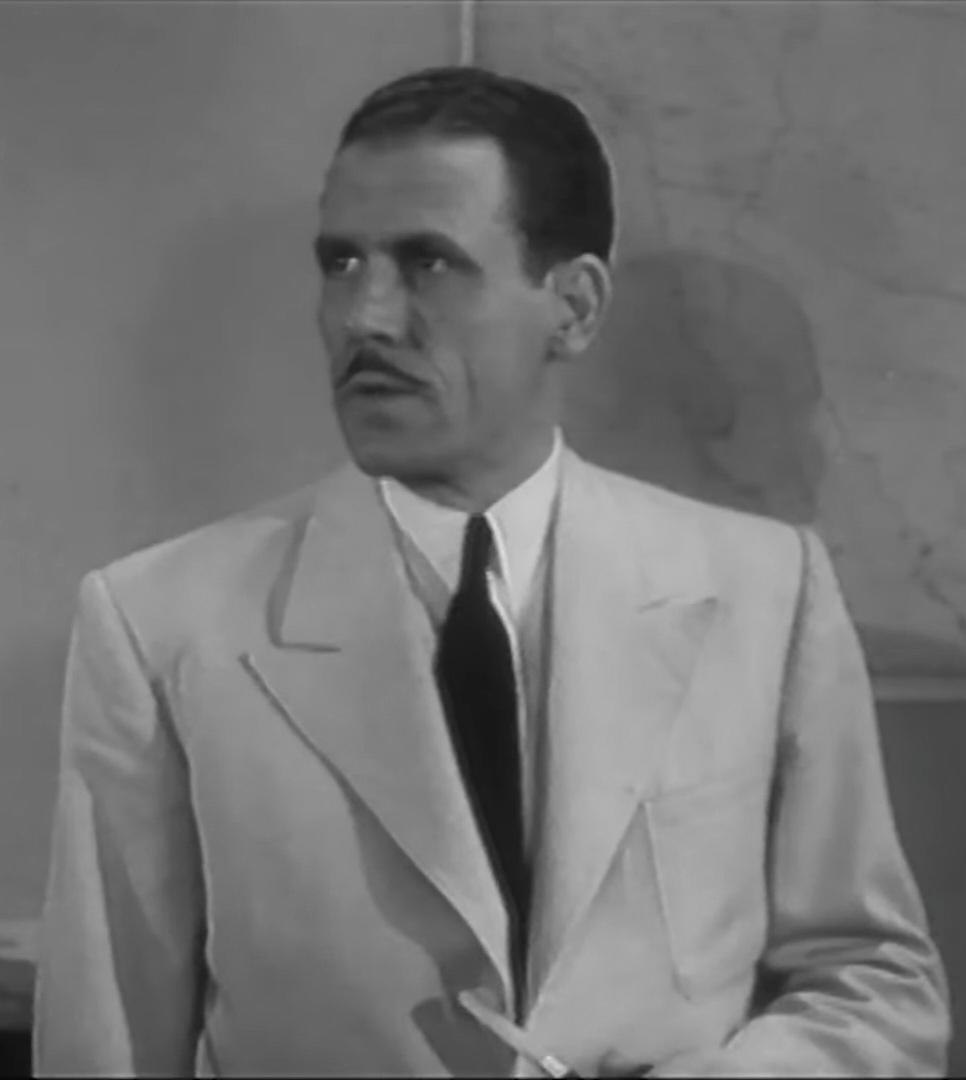
- MacDonald in The Phantom (1943)
- Born: Kenneth Dollins; September 8, 1901; Portland, Indiana, U.S.
- Died: May 5, 1972 (aged 70); Woodland Hills, California, U.S.
- Resting place: Forest Lawn Memorial Park (Hollywood Hills)
- Years active: 1931–1972
- Spouse: LaMee Nave MacDonald (1930–1972) (his death) (3 children)

Kenneth MacDonald (born Kenneth Dollins; September 8, 1901 – May 5, 1972) was an American film actor. Born in Portland, Indiana, MacDonald made more than 220 film and television appearances between 1931 and 1972. His name is sometimes seen as Kenneth McDonald; his later roles sometimes credited him as Kenneth R. MacDonald.

== Career ==
MacDonald began his career as a stage actor. In 1923, he appeared in his first feature film, Slow as Lightning. He came to Hollywood in the early 1930s, where he played small roles in low-budget, independent productions.

In 1939, Kenneth MacDonald was signed by Columbia Pictures for the studio's Charles Starrett westerns. MacDonald perfected a cool, debonair demeanor, which usually masked an evil side as a con man, outlaw, or thief. His speaking voice was rich and well modulated, often being gentle and ominous at the same time, in the Boris Karloff manner. Also, like Karloff, he seldom raised his voice, making his characters both dominant and dangerous. This quality made MacDonald an effective villain in Columbia's adventure serials like Mandrake the Magician, The Phantom, and Black Arrow. He was also adept at playing sympathetic roles, usually as calm authority figures (police official, prison psychiatrist, judge, etc.).

Actors in Columbia's stock company almost always worked in the studio's two-reel comedy shorts as well as features and serials, but Kenneth MacDonald did not join the short-subject fraternity until 1945, when he appeared opposite comedy stars Gus Schilling and Richard Lane. He is probably best known today for his work with The Three Stooges.

MacDonald developed a flair for comedy, and he made memorable appearances in comedy shorts starring The Three Stooges including Monkey Businessmen, Hold That Lion!, Crime on Their Hands, Punchy Cowpunchers, and Loose Loot. Beginning in 1953, the comedy in the Columbia shorts became even more physical under producer-director Jules White, and MacDonald obligingly got plastered with pies, fruit, and other missiles. He also returned to Columbia's serial unit, which was then filming low-budget remakes of his older serials using much of the original footage; MacDonald appeared in new scenes to match his old ones. He left the Columbia shorts department in 1955, but still appeared occasionally in feature films; he played a member of the court martial board in The Caine Mutiny (1954), and had a bit role as Jerry Lewis's father in The Ladies' Man (1961).

=== Television ===
MacDonald began working in television in 1949, in The Lone Ranger (episode eight; he would return to the series in episode 173, 1955). From 1951 to 1953, MacDonald was a frequent guest star, mostly as a sheriff, in the syndicated television series, The Range Rider, with Jock Mahoney and Dick Jones. He appeared six times as Colonel Parker in the ABC western series Colt .45. In 1960, MacDonald appeared as Duggan on the TV western Laramie in the episode titled "Duel at Parkinson Town.". He also appeared in a number of episodes of the TV western Bat Masterson with Gene Barry (MacDonald appeared with Dyan Cannon in "The Price of Paradise" in 1961.)

MacDonald's most prolific work in television was in 32 episodes of CBS's Perry Mason. He played the recurring role of a judge (sometimes named Carter, sometimes named Hartley, other times unnamed) between 1957 and 1966.

== Death ==
MacDonald died of brain and lung cancer at the Motion Picture & Television Country House and Hospital in Woodland Hills, California at the age of 70. He was buried in Forest Lawn Memorial Park in Hollywood Hills.

== Partial filmography ==
- The Last Mile (1932)
- Cocktail Hour (1933)
- Two-Fisted Rangers (1939)
- The Taming of the West (1939)
- The Durango Kid (1940)
- The Wildcat of Tucson (1940)
- Confessions of Boston Blackie (1941)
- Stand By All Networks (1942)
- The Phantom (1943)
- West of the Rio Grande (1944)
- Cornered (1945) as Incza's henchman (uncredited)
- Back to Bataan (1945) Maj. McKinley (uncredited)
- Crossfire (1947) as Major (uncredited)
- Dark Passage (1947) as Humphrey Bogart character before facial surgery (uncredited)
- Frontier Agent (1948)
- Return of the Bad Men (1948)
- Train to Alcatraz (1948)
- The Caine Mutiny (1954) as a Court-Martial Board Member (uncredited)
- The Fastest Gun Alive (1956) uncredited
- 40 Guns to Apache Pass (1966) Harry Malone
- Fantastic Voyage (1966) Henry - heart monitoring

== Three Stooges short subjects ==
- Monkey Businessmen (1946)
- Hold That Lion! (1947)
- Shivering Sherlocks (1948)
- Crime on Their Hands (1948)
- Vagabond Loafers (1949)
- Punchy Cowpunchers (1950)
- Studio Stoops (1950)
- Hula-La-La (1951)
- Three Dark Horses (1952)
- Booty and the Beast (1953)
- Loose Loot (1953)
- Of Cash and Hash (1955)
- Hot Ice (1955)
- Blunder Boys (1955)
- Scheming Schemers (1956)

== Television ==
| Year | Title | Role | Notes |
|---|---|---|---|
| 1949-1955 | The Lone Ranger | Deputy Zack/Sheriff Mason | 4 episodes |
| 1954-1955 | The Cisco Kid | Marshal/Frank Guthrie | 5 episodes |
| 1954 | Captain Midnight | John Sawyer | S1.E5, "Death Below Zero" |
| 1955 | Commando Cody: Sky Marshal of the Universe | Dispersal Station Superintendent | 3 episodes |
| 1955 | The Adventures of Rin-Tin-Tin | Agent | S1.E24, "The Guilty One" |
| 1956 | Crossroads | Doctor Edwards | S2.E2, "Circus Priest" |
| 1956 | My Friend Flicka | Brady | S1.E36, "The Foundlings" |
| 1956 | Steve Donovan, Western Marshal | Chief Marshal | S1.E23, "Stone River" |
| 1956 | Broken Arrow | Lowrie | 3 episodes |
| 1956-1958 | Navy Log | Admiral/Captain | 3 episodes |
| 1956-1960 | Cheyenne | Indian Agent Clum/Sheriff Gaffey | 3 episodes |
| 1957 | The Gray Ghost | Judge Advocate | S1.E7, "The Brothers" |
| 1957 | Dick Powell's Zane Grey Theatre | Jury Foreman | S1.E23, "There Were Four" |
| 1957-1958 | Colt .45 | Col. Parker | 5 episodes |
| 1957-1966 | Perry Mason | Judge Carter/Hartley | 32 episodes |
| 1958 | Wanted Dead or Alive | Sheriff | S1.E17, "Drop to Drink" |
| 1958-1961 | Sugarfoot | Sheriff/Mayor/Mr. Smith | 4 episodes |
| 1958-1961 | Bronco | Sheriff/Sheriff Elliot | 3 episodes |
| 1959 | The Restless Gun | Russ Cantrell | S2.E29, "One on the House" |
| 1959 | Maverick | Sheriff | S3.E15, "A Cure for Johnny Rain" |
| 1959 | The Rough Riders | Oliver Wentworth | S1.E17, "Wilderness Trace" |
| 1959 | Frontier Doctor | Sheriff Quinn | S1.E29, "Danger Valley" |
| 1959 | The Texan | Ed Grover | S1.E23, "The Marshal of Yellow Jacket" |
| 1959-1961 | Bat Masterson | Sam Jansen/Tack Colby | 2 episodes |
| 1959-1961 | The Deputy | Sheriff/Charlie | 2 episodes |
| 1959-1961 | Rawhide | Townsman/Morgan Shaw/Bartender | 3 episodes |
| 1959-1960 | Laramie | Captain Reeves/Zeke/Duggan | 4 episodes |
| 1960 | Checkmate | Elmer | S1.E1, "Death Runs Wild" |
| 1960 | Bonanza | Sheriff | S1.E18, "A House Divided" |
| 1960 | The Man from Blackhawk | Jess | S1.E27, "The Search for Cope Borden" |
| 1960-1962 | Wagon Train | General Collins/Wagon Train Member | 2 episodes |
| 1961 | The Life and Legend of Wyatt Earp | Howard Stacey | S6.E20, "Casey and the Clowns" |
| 1961 | Gunslinger | Sheriff Ed Harkness | S1.E12, "New Savannah" |
| 1961 | Angel | Mr. Nicks | S1.E15, "Happy Marriage" |
| 1962 | Going My Way | Captain | S1.E12, "A Dog for Father Fitz" |
| 1962 | Surfside 6 | Major Croton | S2.E24, "The Green Beret" |
| 1962 | Ripcord | Dr. Page | S1.E19, "Double Drop" |
| 1962 | Frontier Circus | Canfield | S1.E22, "The Good Fight" |
| 1963 | Wide Country | Doctor (uncredited) | S1.E18, "Speckle Bird" |
| 1963-1964 | The Travels of Jaimie McPheeters | Army Captain/Miner | 2 episodes |
| 1963-1964 | Temple Houston | Jury Foreman/Election Officer | 2 episodes |
| 1964 | Voyage to the Bottom of the Sea | Surgeon | S1.E13, "The Blizzard Makers" |
| 1964 | 77 Sunset Strip | Police Chief (uncredited) | S6.E15, "Lovers' Lane" |
| 1964 | Valentine's Day | Principal Melvin R. Roberts | S1.E8, "The Old School Tie" |
| 1965 | Daniel Boone | Hamer | 2 episodes |
| 1966 | This Is the Life | unknown | S6.E33, "Man Adrift" |
| 1969 | Then Came Bronson | The Banker | S1.E7, "The 3:13 Arrives at Noon" |
| 1969 | Judd, for the Defense | Judge Waylan | S2.E24, "Visitation" |
| 1972 | The F.B.I. | Davis | S7.E22, "The Test" |
