= The White Outlaw (1929 film) =

1929 film

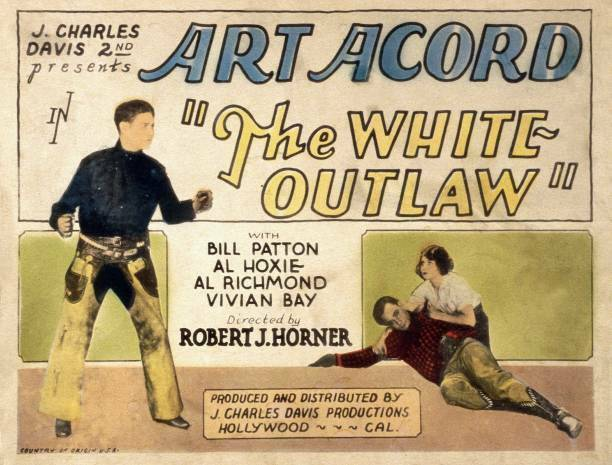
- Directed by: Robert J. Horner
- Written by: Robert McKenzie
- Produced by: Robert J. Horner; J. Charles Davis; Ralph M. Like
- Starring: Art Acord; Bill Patton; Lew Meehan
- Cinematography: Ernest Laszlo
- Edited by: William Austin
- Production company: J. Charles Davis Productions
- Distributed by: Exhibitors Film Corporation
- Release date: January 7, 1929
- Running time: 56 minutes
- Country: United States
- Languages: Silent; English intertitles

The White Outlaw is a 1929 American silent Western film directed by Robert J. Horner and starring Art Acord, Bill Patton and Lew Meehan. A print of The White Outlaw exists and is available on DVD.

== Cast ==
- Art Acord as Johnny 'The White Outlaw' Douglas
- Vivian Bay as Janice Holbrook
- Bill Patton as Ted Williams
- Dick Nores as Chet Wagner
- Lew Meehan as Jed Isbell
- Betty Carter as Mary Holbrook
- Al Hoxie as Sheriff Ralston
- Howard Davies as Colonel Holbrook
- Walter Maly as Deputy Bud Mason
- Slim Mathews as Joe Walton
- Bill Conant as 2nd Sheriff
- Robert McKenzie as Townsman
- Fred Parker as Bartender
- James Sheridan as Checkers Player

== Bibliography ==
- Langman, Larry. A Guide to Silent Westerns. Greenwood Publishing Group, 1992.
