= Lionel S. Reiss =

Polish-born American artist

- Born: Lionel Samson Reiss; January 29, 1894; Jaroslaw, Austro-Hungarian Empire (now Poland)
- Died: April 16, 1988 (aged 94); Manhattan, New York City, New York

Lionel Samson Reiss (January 29, 1894 – April 16, 1988) was a Polish-American artist and writer.

== Biography ==
=== Early life and career ===
Reiss was born to a Polish-Jewish family in Jaroslaw, Poland (which at the time was part of the Austro-Hungarian Empire). His parents joined the ranks of other Eastern European Jews who were fleeing their native countries at the start of the 20th century; In 1898, when Reiss was four years old, he and his family immigrated to the United States, and settled in the Lower East Side of Manhattan in New York City, where he would spend the majority of his life.

Growing up, Reiss studied commercial art, and found work as a commercial artist for newspapers and publishers, before being hired as the art director for Paramount Pictures, and is credited to be the creator of the Leo the Lion logo for Metro-Goldwyn-Mayer.

Reiss became known for his portraits of Jewish people and landmarks in Jewish history, which he made during his trip to Europe, Africa, and the Middle East in the early 1920s. Being of Jewish heritage, Reiss became fascinated with Jewish life in the Old World. In 1919, Reiss temporarily left the United States to travel to the aforementioned regions, and recorded the everyday life that he encountered in the ghettos. His trip resulted in exhibitions in major American cities.

=== Writing ===
At the dawn of the Holocaust in 1938, Reiss, who had long returned to the United States, published his book My Models Were Jews, in which he illustratively argued that there is no such thing as a "Jewish ethnicity", but the Jewish people are rather a cultural group, whereby there is significant diversity within Jewish communities and between different communities in different geographical regions. Reiss was therefore presenting an argument against what he considered to be a common misconception that existed about the Jews. Later works included a 1954 book, New Lights and Old Shadows, which dealt with "the new lights" of a reborn Israel and the "old shadows" of an almost eradicated European Jewish culture. In his last book, A World of Twilight, published in 1972, with text by Isaac Bashevis Singer, Reiss presented a portrait of the Jewish communities in Eastern Europe before the Holocaust.

== Death ==
Reiss died on April 16, 1988, at his home in Central Park West in Manhattan. He was 94 years old.

== Legacy ==
Today, Reiss' art has been collected by many institutions, including the Brooklyn Museum; Bezalel Museum, Israel; Jewish Theological Seminary of America; the Smithsonian Institution, Jewish Museum, and the Tel Aviv Museum of Art.
