= Punchy Cowpunchers =

1950 American short film by Edward Bernds

- Directed by: Edward Bernds
- Written by: Edward Bernds
- Produced by: Hugh McCollum
- Starring: Moe Howard; Larry Fine; Shemp Howard; Christine McIntyre; Jock O'Mahoney; Kenneth MacDonald; Vernon Dent; Emil Sitka; Dick Wessel; Stanley Price; George Chesebro; John L. Cason; Ted Mapes; Heinie Conklin; Blackie Whiteford
- Cinematography: Vincent J. Farrar
- Edited by: Henry DeMond
- Distributed by: Columbia Pictures
- Release date: January 5, 1950 (U.S.)
- Running time: 17:18
- Country: United States
- Language: English

Punchy Cowpunchers is a 1950 short subject written and directed by Edward Bernds starring American slapstick comedy team The Three Stooges (Moe Howard, Larry Fine and Shemp Howard). It is the 120th entry in the series released by Columbia Pictures starring the comedians, who released 190 shorts for the studio between 1934 and 1959.

== Plot ==
The Dillon family holds sway over a diminutive Western enclave, prompting Nell to dispatch her partner, Elmer, in pursuit of aid. Concurrently, within the confines of the United States Cavalry, the trio of Stooges persistently vex their superior, Sergeant Major Mullins. Despite Mullins' exertions to instill discipline, his efforts yield unforeseen repercussions, culminating in a confrontation with Captain Daley, his superior officer. However, prior to further escalation, the Colonel apprises Mullins of the malevolent activities perpetrated by the Dillon clan, necessitating intervention to evict them from the township. Seizing upon the opportunity, Mullins volunteers the unwitting Stooges for the undertaking.

Assuming the guise of rugged outlaws, the Stooges infiltrate the local saloon under the pretense of waitstaff, endeavoring to covertly gather intelligence on Dillon and his associates. However, their stratagem is compromised when Moe's counterfeit mustache detaches, landing directly upon Dillon's countenance. Consequently, the Stooges find themselves ensnared by Dillon's gang, with Moe and Larry bound while Shemp is confined within a secure enclosure.

Meanwhile, Elmer's attempt to procure aid from the United States Cavalry is thwarted by their absence due to financial disbursements. Disheartened, Elmer returns to discover Nell single-handedly subduing any cowboy who ventures into her proximity. Ultimately, through a sequence of comedic misadventures, the Stooges emerge triumphant over the Dillons.

== Cast ==
=== Credited ===
- Moe Howard as Moe
- Larry Fine as Larry
- Shemp Howard as Shemp
- Jock O'Mahoney as Elmer
- Christine McIntyre as Nell
- Kenneth MacDonald as Dillon
- Dick Wessel as Sergeant Mullins
- Vernon Dent as Cavalry Colonel
- Emil Sitka as Captain Daley

=== Uncredited ===
- Stanley Price as Lefty
- Ted Mapes as Red
- George Chesebro as Jeff
- John L. Cason as Black Jack
- Heinie Conklin as Bartender
- Blackie Whiteford as Cowboy at bar

== Production notes ==
Punchy Cowpunchers was filmed on February 7–10, 1949 at the Columbia Ranch on Stages X and W. It is one of the few entries in the Stooge canon to feature an extensive musical soundtrack. It also features all four of the core supporting actors who appeared in the majority of the team's post-Curly films: Christine McIntyre, Kenneth MacDonald, Vernon Dent and Emil Sitka.
