= Broken Lullaby =

1932 film directed by Ernst Lubitsch

- Original poster
- Directed by: Ernst Lubitsch
- Written by: Samson Raphaelson; Ernest Vajda
- Based on: L'homme que j'ai tué 1930 play by Maurice Rostand; The Man I Killed 1931 english version play by Reginald Berkeley
- Produced by: Ernst Lubitsch
- Starring: Lionel Barrymore; Nancy Carroll; Phillips Holmes
- Cinematography: Victor Milner
- Music by: W. Franke Harling
- Production company: Paramount Pictures
- Distributed by: Paramount Pictures
- Release date: January 19, 1932
- Running time: 76 minutes
- Country: United States
- Language: English

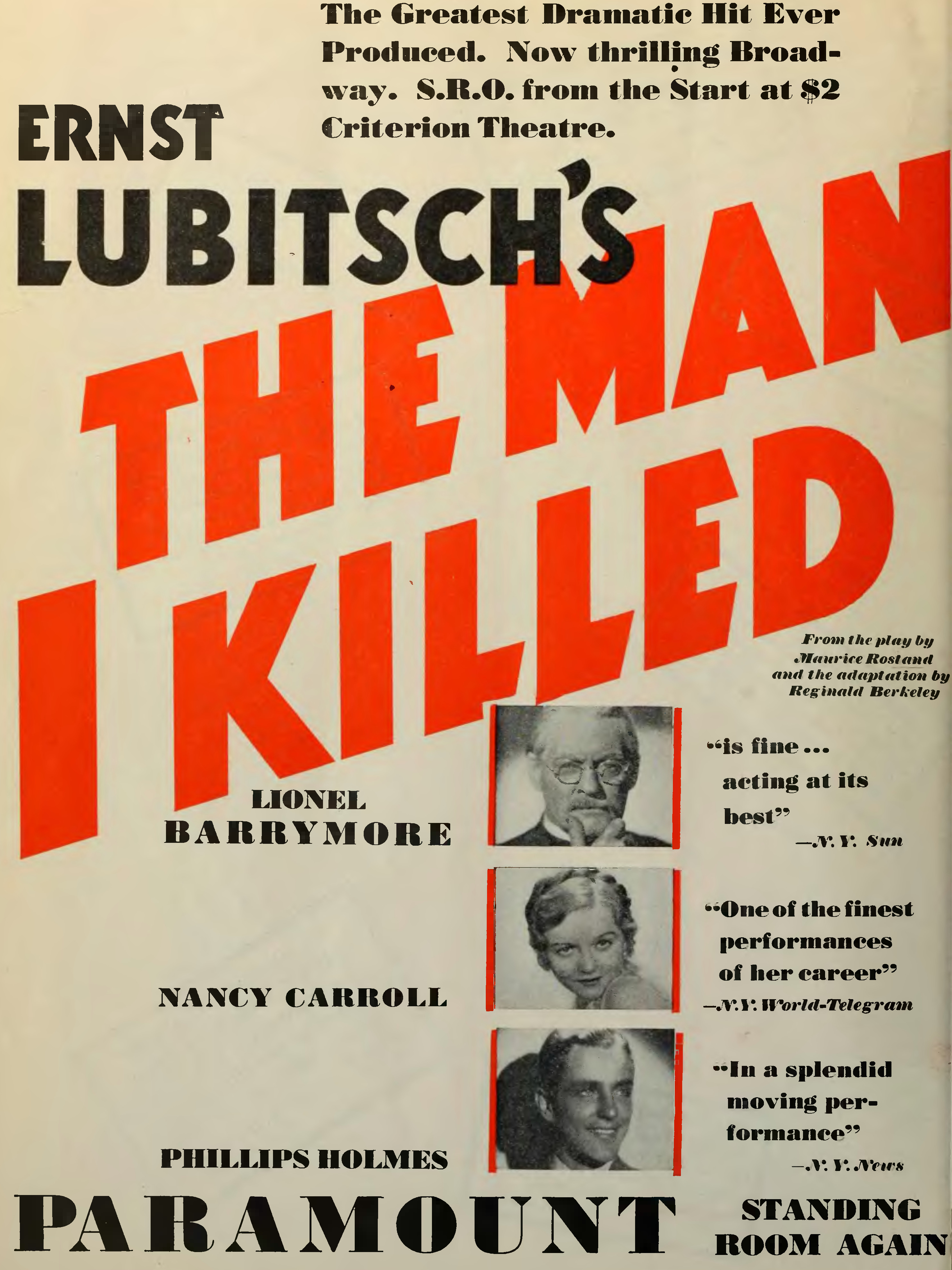
The Man I Killed ad in The Film Daily, 1932

Broken Lullaby (a.k.a. The Man I Killed) is a 1932 American pre-Code drama film directed by Ernst Lubitsch and released by Paramount Pictures. The screenplay by Samson Raphaelson and Ernest Vajda is based on the 1930 play L'homme que j'ai tué by Maurice Rostand and its 1931 English-language adaptation, The Man I Killed, by Reginald Berkeley.

== Plot ==
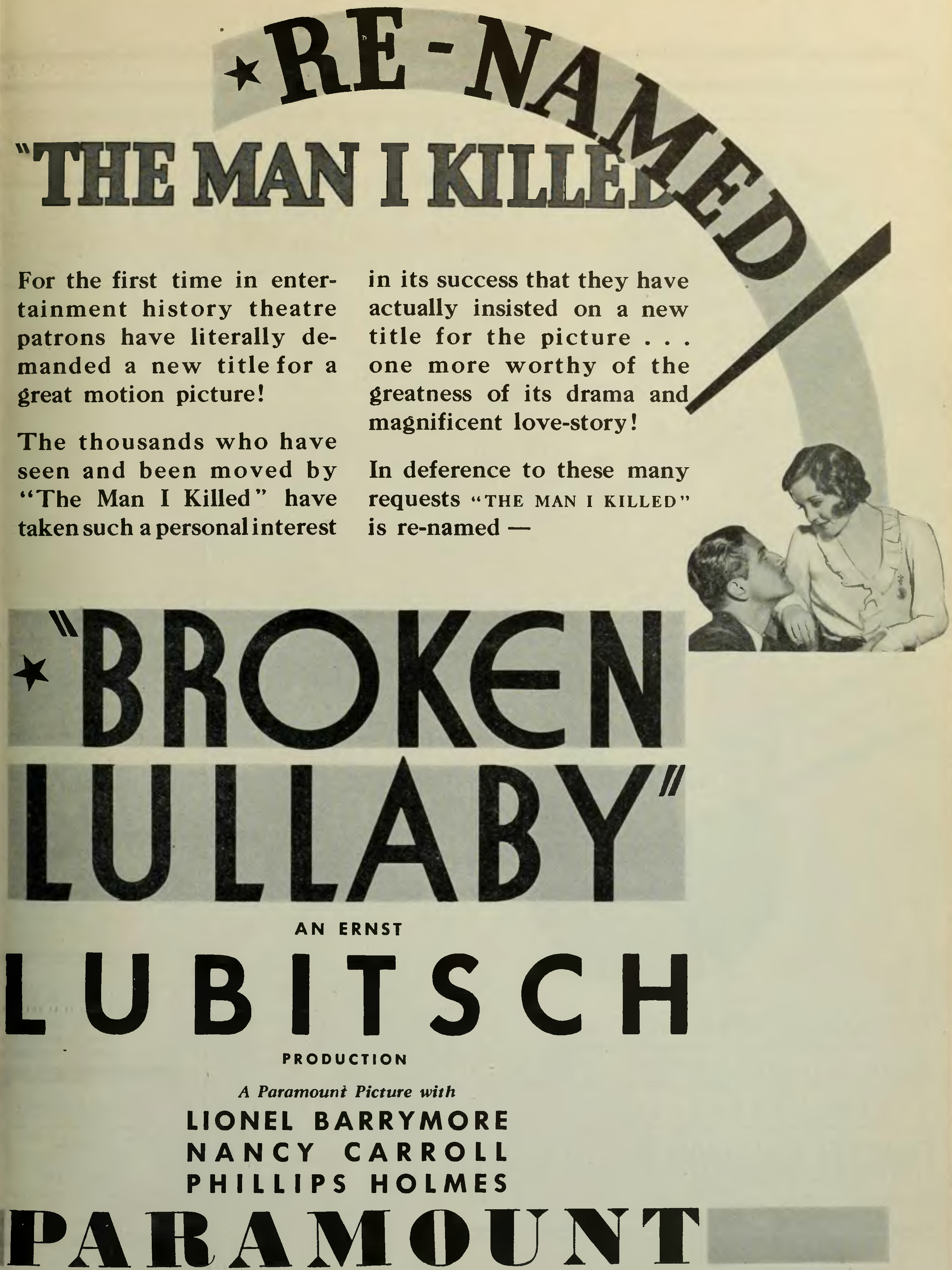
"The Man I Killed" renamed "Broken Lullaby" ad in The Film Daily, 1932

Haunted by the memory of Walter Holderlin, a soldier he killed during World War I, French musician Paul Renard confesses to a priest, who grants him absolution. Using the address on a letter he found on the dead man's body, Paul then travels to Germany to find his family.

As anti-French sentiment continues to permeate Germany, Dr. Holderlin initially refuses to welcome Paul into his home, but changes his mind when his son's fiancée Elsa identifies him as the man who has been leaving flowers on Walter's grave. Rather than reveal the real connection between them, Paul tells the Holderlin family he was a friend of their son, who attended the same musical conservatory he did.

Although the hostile townspeople and local gossips disapprove, the Holderlins befriend Paul, who finds himself falling in love with Elsa. When she shows Paul her former fiancé's bedroom, he becomes distraught and tells her the truth. She convinces him not to confess to Walter's parents, who have embraced him as their second son, and Paul agrees to forgo easing his conscience and stays with his adopted family. Dr. Holderlin presents Walter's violin to Paul, who plays it while Elsa accompanies him on the piano.

== Cast ==
- Lionel Barrymore as Dr H. Holderlin
- Nancy Carroll as Fraulein Elsa, Walter's Fiancée
- Phillips Holmes as Paul Renard
- Louise Carter as Frau Holderlin
- Lucien Littlefield as Herr Walter Schultz
- ZaSu Pitts as Anna, Holderlin's Maid
- Frank Sheridan as Priest
- Emma Dunn as Frau Miller
- George Irving as Townsman (uncredited)
- Tully Marshall as Gravedigger (uncredited)

== Production ==
The film's original title, The Man I Killed, was changed to The Fifth Commandment to avoid giving "wrong impressions in the minds of the public about the character of the story." It ultimately was released as Broken Lullaby.

The film was presented at the Venice International Film Festival. According to The Hollywood Reporter, Czechoslovakia banned the film due to its "pacifistic theme". It was screened at the 2006 San Sebastián International Film Festival as part of an Ernst Lubitsch retrospective.

== Critical reception ==
Mordaunt Hall of The New York Times called the film "further evidence of Mr. Lubitsch's genius, for, while it is tearful, its story is unfurled in a poetic fashion, with an unexcelled performance by Lionel Barrymore and fine acting by Phillips Holmes and Nancy Carroll." He added, "Each sequence is fashioned with sincerity and great care. The different scenes are all photographed with admirable artistry ... The magic of the Lubitsch mind is not only reflected in the artistry of the production and the direction, but also in the habiliments of the players and their make-up."

Variety wrote that the film was "well made, heavy and dramatic", and while acknowledging that "Artistically there is much in the film's favor", its "somber theme" and the "rigid unravelling [of the story] brooking no compromise" may prove difficult to attract an audience, and it was unlikely to be a financial success. The reviewer commented that the film "is particularly noteworthy for another superb performance by Lionel Barrymore."

Florabel Muir, writing for Motion Picture Herald described the film as "new and daring" and stated that it approached the "aftermath of war from a novel angle." She explained that of the approximately one hundred films she had viewed during 1937, she considered this film "the most magnificent of them all." Muir wrote that Lionel Barrymore "walks away" with the picture, and that the performances of Phillips Holmes and Nancy Carroll were also of a high standard.

More recently, Pauline Kael called Phillips Holmes "unspeakably handsome but an even more unspeakable actor," thought Nancy Carroll was "miserably miscast," and added, "Lubitsch can't entirely escape his own talent, and the film is beautifully crafted, but he mistook drab, sentimental hokum for ironic, poetic tragedy."

Time Out London said, "The acting is overwrought; the dialogue is uniformly on-the-nose. Yet 'purity' is the word that comes to mind: The movie is a nakedly sincere ode to the power of sympathy, and it's not to be missed."

== Home media ==
The film has been released for the Region 2 market. It is in fullscreen format and has an audio track in English and subtitles in English and Spanish.

The film was also released in 2021 on Blu-ray by Kino Lorber, featuring an audio commentary by Joseph McBride.

== Remake ==
A French remake entitled Frantz was released in 2016. The film was directed by François Ozon, co-written by Ozon and Philippe Piazzo, and stars Pierre Niney and Paula Beer among others.
