= Louis D. Lighton =

American screenwriter

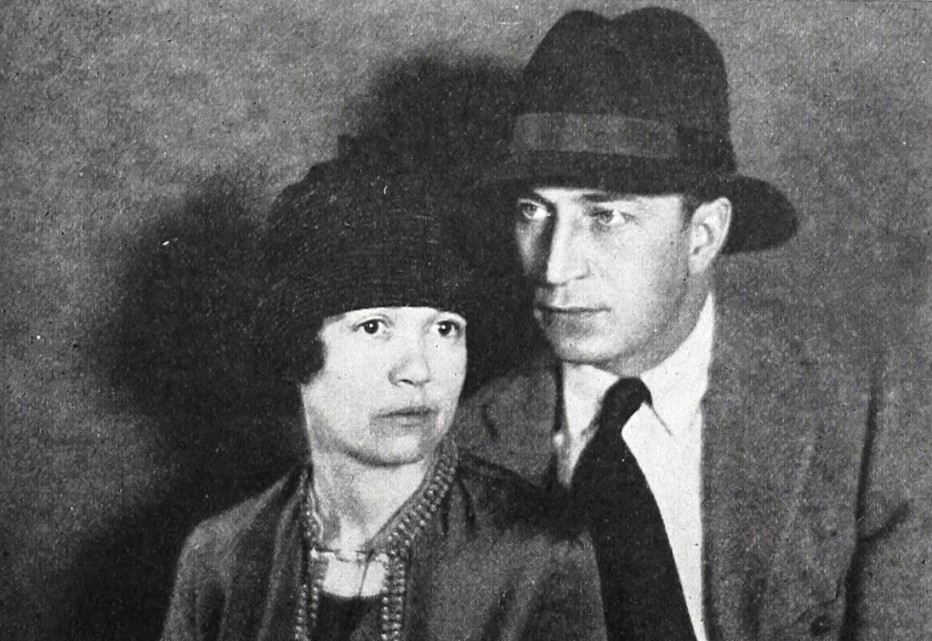
- Hope Loring and Louis D Lighton in 1925
- Born: November 25, 1895; Omaha, Nebraska, USA
- Died: February 1, 1963 (aged 67); Palma de Mallorca, Spain
- Years active: 1920–1951
- Spouse: Hope Loring

Louis D. Lighton (November 25, 1895 – February 1, 1963) was an American screenwriter and producer. He wrote for 40 films between 1920 and 1927. He also produced 30 films between 1928 and 1951. He was born in Omaha, Nebraska and died in Palma de Mallorca, Spain. He was married to fellow screenwriter Hope Loring.

Producer David Lewis called him "a well-read, gentlemanly man, quite handsome, tall and well dressed. As a human being, he stood out from the other Paramount producers, who might have been more commercial but not of his quality... He never made a decision without the consent of his wife, Hope. She had been a writer, and rumor had it she had been the mainspring of his career. She was older than he, had previously been married, and had a young daughter. She was a very strong-willed woman; when she married Bud, he became her career."

== Selected filmography ==
- The Champion Liar (1920)
- The Big Catch (1920)
- Flesh and Blood (1922)
- Paid Back (1922)
- The Woman of Bronze (1923)
- An Old Sweetheart of Mine (1923)
- Don't Marry for Money (1923)
- East Side - West Side (1923)
- Cornered (1924)
- K – The Unknown (1924)
- The Lullaby (1924)
- Little Annie Rooney (1925)
- Wandering Footsteps (1925)
- Ranger of the Big Pines (1925)
- The Crown of Lies (1926)
- The Blind Goddess (1926)
- Fig Leaves (1926)
- It (1927)
- Children of Divorce (1927)
- Wings (1927)
- The Virginian (1929)
- Tom Sawyer (1930)
- Alice in Wonderland (1933, uncredited)
- The Lives of a Bengal Lancer (1935)
- Captains Courageous (1937)
- Test Pilot (1938)
- A Tree Grows in Brooklyn (1945)
- The Black Rose (1950)
- No Highway in the Sky (1951)

== Notes ==
- Lewis, David (1993). Curtis, James (ed.). The Creative Producer. Metuchen: Scarecrow Press. ISBN 0-8108-2720-4.
