= The Mystery Rider =

1928 film

- Directed by: Robert J. Horner
- Written by: Robert J. Horner; Bert Ames (titles)
- Produced by: Robert J. Horner
- Starring: William Desmond
- Cinematography: Paul Allen
- Edited by: Frank Penrock
- Distributed by: Universal Pictures
- Release date: November 25, 1928
- Country: United States
- Languages: Silent; English intertitles

The Mystery Rider is a lost 1928 American silent Western film serial directed by Robert J. Horner and starring William Desmond. Horner produced and released through Universal Pictures. AFI has the film listed as a five-reel feature (a possible whittled-down five-reel version of the serial).

A trailer for the film (or its episodes) survives in the Library of Congress.

== Cast ==
- William Desmond - Winthrop Lane/The Mystery Rider
- Derelys Perdue - Grace Wentworth
- Tom London - David Manning/The Claw
- Bud Osborne - Bull Leonard
- Walter Shumway - Norman Wentworth
- Ned Bassett - The Sheriff
- Syd Saylor -
- Ben Corbett -
- Slim Lucas -
- Jack Shannon -
- Bud McClure -

== Episodes ==
- 1. The Clutching Claw
- 2. Trapped
- 3. The Stampede
- 4. Hands Up
- 5. Buried Alive
- 6. The Fatal Shot
- 7. Hurled Through Space
- 8. Unmasked
- 9. Doomed
- 10. The End of the Trail
