= Buffalo Bill's Last Fight =

1927 film

- Directed by: John W. Noble
- Written by: Russell Hickson
- Produced by: Herbert T. Kalmus
- Starring: Duke R. Lee; J. Barney Sherry; Richard Walling; Marjorie Daw
- Cinematography: George Cave
- Production companies: Metro-Goldwyn-Mayer; Technicolor Corporation
- Distributed by: Metro-Goldwyn-Mayer
- Release date: November 26, 1927
- Country: United States
- Language: Silent English Intertitles
- Budget: $22,426.48

Buffalo Bill's Last Fight is a 1927 MGM silent fictionalized film short in two-color Technicolor. It was the second short film produced as part of Metro-Goldwyn-Mayer's "Great Events" series. As with the first film in the series, The Flag: A Story Inspired by the Tradition of Betsy Ross, this film continued the series' original intent to focus on events from American history. Ultimately, only one other short (The Heart of General Robert E. Lee) was shot which stuck to this format; the other films in the series featured historical events with a European or Asian focus.

== Production ==
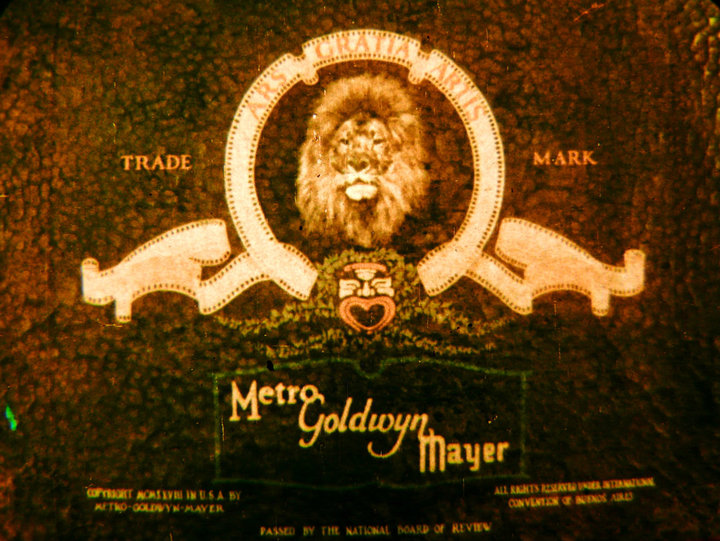
The MGM logo at the start of the film featured a rarely-used lion in Technicolor.

The film was shot at the Tec-Art Studio in Hollywood and at the Arapahoe Indian Reservation in Riverton, Wyoming.

Because this film used Technicolor and the studio wanted to feature the process in the MGM logo, a new lion, Numa, was shot to appear in the two-color strip process. He received the nickname Bill after the title of this film.
