= Hold That Lion! (1947 film) =

1947 film by Jules White

- Lobby card
- Directed by: Jules White
- Written by: Felix Adler
- Produced by: Jules White
- Starring: Moe Howard; Larry Fine; Shemp Howard; Curly Howard; Kenneth MacDonald; Emil Sitka; Dudley Dickerson; Heinie Conklin; Victor Travers; Blackie Whiteford; Dorothy Mueller; Tanner The Lion
- Cinematography: George F. Kelley
- Edited by: Edwin H. Bryant
- Distributed by: Columbia Pictures
- Release date: July 17, 1947 (U.S.)
- Running time: 16:39
- Country: United States
- Language: English

Hold That Lion! is a 1947 short subject directed by Jules White starring American slapstick comedy team The Three Stooges (Moe Howard, Larry Fine and Shemp Howard). It is the 100th entry in the series released by Columbia Pictures starring the comedians, who released 190 shorts for the studio between 1934 and 1959.

== Plot ==
The Stooges are the sole heirs to a grandiose inheritance, which has fallen into the clutches of the duplicitous broker, Icabod Slipp, who has taken control of the funds. Engaging in a series of confrontations with Slipp in his office, the Stooges are subjected to false accusations of being the culprits responsible for the misappropriation of funds. Consequently, Slipp absconds with the inheritance, prompting the Stooges to pursue him.

Their pursuit leads them onto a train, where they navigate a series of misadventures. Dodging a vigilant conductor, the Stooges seek refuge in a crate within the baggage car, unaware that it harbors an unexpected occupant — a lion. As chaos ensues, the Stooges find themselves entangled in a slapstick sequence of events, inadvertently revealing their presence to the train's passengers.

Amidst the confusion, the Stooges must contend with the lion's unwelcome presence, leading to an exchange of mishaps and misunderstandings. As they navigate the perilous situation, the Stooges ultimately confront Slipp in a climactic showdown within the confines of the baggage car. Through a combination of wit and physical prowess, the Stooges emerge victorious, overcoming Slipp's machinations and reclaiming their inheritance.

== Cast ==
=== Credited ===
- Shemp Howard as Shemp
- Larry Fine as Larry
- Moe Howard as Moe
- Kenneth MacDonald as Icabod Slipp
- Emil Sitka as Attorney
- Dudley Dickerson as Pullman Porter

=== Uncredited ===
- Heinie Conklin as Train Conductor
- Curly Howard as Sleeping Train Passenger
- Tanner the Lion as himself
- Victor Travers as Bearded Man
- Blackie Whiteford as Train Passenger
- Sam Lufkin as Train Passenger
- Dorothy Mueller as Train Passenger

== Production notes ==
Hold That Lion! was filmed on January 28–31, 1947, the first film produced after the new year. The film premiered the final version of "Three Blind Mice" as the Stooges' theme music, an updated, faster version arranged by Spud Murphy in the key of F major (the Curly period featured versions in G major, making it easy to differentiate between the two eras). With minor variations (all in F), this version was used through the end of Stooges' short subject releases in 1959. Although Hold That Lion! was the third film released featuring Shemp after his return to the Stooges, it was filmed after Squareheads of the Round Table and The Hot Scots, both which still utilized the "sliding strings" version of "Three Blind Mice" featured in the previous Shemp entries Fright Night and Out West, and in the final 12 entries starring Curly.

The film title is a parody of the football term, "Hold that line!"

Icabod Slipp's name appears on the door as "I. Slipp." This is a semantic parody on the Long Island town of Islip, New York.

This was the final Three Stooges film (excluding Booty and the Beast) to feature Tanner the Lion, who had previously appeared in You Nazty Spy!, Three Missing Links, Wee Wee Monsieur, and Movie Maniacs, as well as his last film appearance in general, before the lion's death in 1952. Whenever Tanner was required to growl or act angry, he was filmed by himself, while when he was onscreen with other people, he was filmed in a tame state. The FAO Schwarz lion plush served as a stand-in for Tanner for when the Stooges see him sitting at the foot of their bed. The film also recycled gags from Tanner's previous appearances (breathing from behind and licking the Stooges' feet).

Shemp Howard (a man of many phobias) was reportedly so frightened of lions that he insisted a glass plate be placed in between him and Tanner while filming the scene in the crate, and the Stooges' reflection in the glass can be seen as they are hastily exiting the crate. Apparently, though, Columbia Pictures hired Tanner who was currently in his elder years. Emil Sitka later commented that the feline was "so sickly, he would fall asleep in the middle of a take."

There is an audio goof in the film during a scene that featured Dudley Dickerson reacting to the lion. The laughing of a crew member can be heard in the background.

When the Stooges exit the berth, Larry's stunt-double can briefly be seen.

=== Curly Howard returns ===
Hold That Lion! is notable for a cameo appearance by former Stooge Curly, younger brother of Shemp and Moe. He appears as a snoring passenger who the Stooges think is Icabod Slipp, the man they are looking for. This was the only film that featured not only all four of the original stooges in new footage together but also the three Howard brothers — Moe, Curly, and Shemp — in new footage within the same film. This also marks the first time Curly is shown on camera with a full head of hair, and his only film appearance following the stroke that ended his career as a full-time Stooge.

Director Jules White remembers:

It was a spur of the moment idea. Curly was visiting the set; this was some time after his stroke. Apparently he came in on his own since I didn't see a nurse with him. He was sitting around, reading a newspaper. As I walked in, the newspaper, which he had in front of his face, came down and he waved hello to me. I thought it would be funny to have him do a bit in the picture, and he was happy to do it.

=== Recycling template ===
Hold That Lion! would be the template for recycled films starting in 1953. Three films in a row utilized footage from this short:

- First, Booty and the Beast recycled the second half of Hold That Lion! consisting of scenes on the train (including Curly Howard's cameo);
- Next, Loose Loot recycled the first half, consisting of scenes in various offices;
- Finally, Tricky Dicks recycled the only segment from Hold That Lion! not previously used: the filing cabinet sequence from the early office scenes.

Due to this successful practice, director Jules White would begin recycling entire scenes (rather than re-film them) as a cost-saving tactic for the remainder of the Stooges' tenure in Columbia Pictures' short subject department.
