= The Champion Liar =

1920 film

- Directed by: Hoot Gibson
- Written by: Robert J. Horner; Louis D. Lighton
- Starring: Hoot Gibson
- Distributed by: Universal
- Release date: September 11, 1920
- Running time: 20 minutes
- Country: United States
- Languages: Silent; English intertitles

The Champion Liar is a 1920 American short silent Western film directed by and starring Hoot Gibson for Universal Film Manufacturing Co.

== Plot ==
This plot summary comes from the Library of Congress copyright registration for the film.

Billy Lane, who plies his trade of lying more out of habit than desire, is conceded the championship over all fabricators in eastern Wyoming. Jane Branch, who holds undisputed sway in Billy's desires for a co-partner through life, loves Billy far more than she would let him know, which only tends to increase Billy's desire to make her his wife. Billy is at the height of his glory one morning as he is relating to Jane a supposedly brave deed, when she upbraids him for his perpetual lying and asks him why he did not keep his engagement with her the night previous. Billy, with an eye for peace, tells her of his experiences with an old lady who made her living by washing other people's clothes and how he happened along and assisted her on the night he was supposed to call on Jane. When he finished washing the clothes it was too late to call on Jane, so he went home. Just as Billy finishes narrating his latest lie, he is confronted by the small brother of the girl on whom Billy had called the night he was supposed to have played gallant for the old lady. The boy had been sent by his sister to deliver to Billy the gloves he left at the house. This latest deceit on Billy's part "queers" him with Jane, and she leaves him in a huff.

Things would have worked themselves out more smoothly had not the Rev. J. Arthur Middlehorn arrived on one of his circuit rides to visit the various ranches in the district. Jane devotes all of her attention to the Reverend, much to the discomfort of Billy, who is left in the cold. Billy, suddenly hitting upon an idea, makes love to Ola, the cook, while Jane is in the next room dressing for a picnic. She overhears his pleadings and enters the kitchen as Ola, mistaking Billy's intentions, throws her arms around him.

Rev. Middlehorn and Jane, having made preparations for a little outing of their own, the Parson asks Billy where he can find a good spot for a picnic. Billy, planning to have some fun, directs him far out into the desert, where he finally loses his way. When Jane misses the Parson she questions Billy, who tells her of his prank. She immediately mounts her horse to locate the Reverend. Curly O'Brien, who was madly in love with Jane, but whose love was not reciprocated, sees Jane leave and follows her. Jane locates Rev. Middlehorn, when she is confronted by Curly, who forces his attentions on her, which she resents. They engage in a struggle, but the Parson is unable to assist Jane. Billy, discovering the girl's absence, goes in search of her. He arrives in time to see the girl and Curly struggling, gives Curly an awful thrashing, and Jane, who can no longer disguise her true feelings for Billy, forgives him for his past faults as they embrace.

— Robert J. Horner and Louis D. Lighton, scenario writers, credited at the LOC to Horner.

== Cast ==
- Hoot Gibson as Billy Lane
- Jim Corey as Curly
- Dorothy Woods as Jane
- Andrew Waldron as Father
- Jack Walters as Minister
- Ida Tonbrook as Ola

== See also ==
- List of American films of 1920
- Hoot Gibson filmography
