= Louise Carter =

American actress (1875–1957)

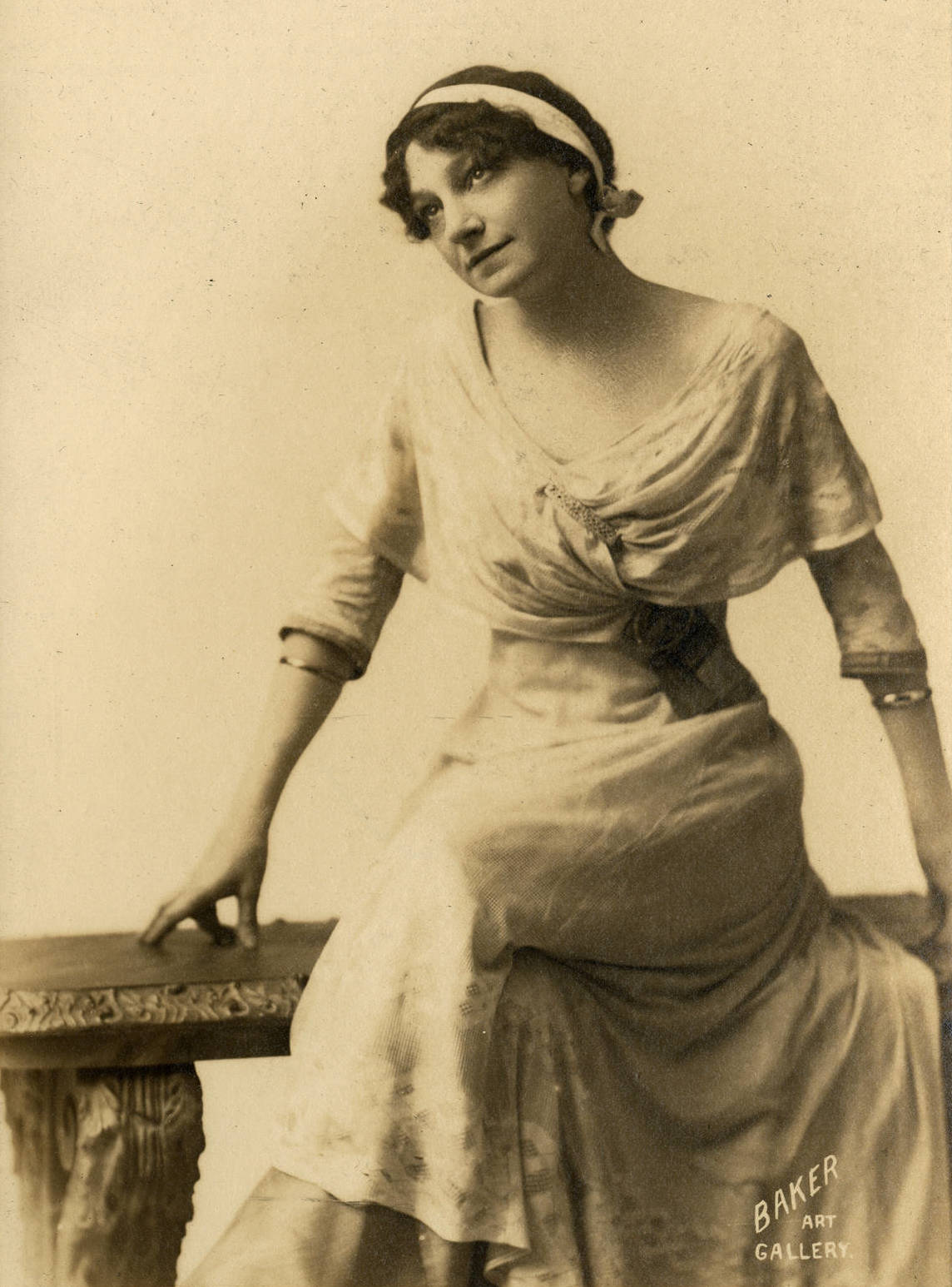
- Born: Betty-Lee Carter; March 17, 1875; Denison, Iowa, United States
- Died: November 10, 1957 (Age 82); Los Angeles, California, United States
- Occupation: Actress
- Years active: 1924 - 1940 (film)
- Spouses: Frederick Seymour; Cobrun Broun

Louise Carter (born Betty-Lee Carter; March 17, 1875 – November 10, 1957) was an American stage and film actress. She appeared in 48 films between 1924 and 1940, mostly in maternal supporting roles. Among her roles were the mother of Paul Muni in I Am a Fugitive from a Chain Gang (1932), the wife of Lionel Barrymore in Broken Lullaby (1932) and the wife of W. C. Fields in You're Telling Me! (1934).

== Early years ==
Carter was born Betty-Lee Carter on March 17, 1875, in Denison, Iowa. Her parents, Lawrence "Louis" J. Carter and Philomine Richards Carter, were French-Canadian. She had five younger siblings, and she was a graduate of Denison High School.

== Career ==
By 1902, Carter had acted in Boston, New London, and New York City. She became the leading lady of the Gotham Stock Company in New York City in 1911. The company performed in Orpheum Company vaudeville houses owned by Percy G. Williams, who often had the cast of a play present it in one theater, then hurry to a second theater in the chain for another performance in the same evening. In 1928, Carter and her daughter Betty-Lee acted together in Skidding at the Bayes Theatre in New York City.

Carter also wrote plays, including the one-act The Soldiers, which was presented in Toronto by a stock touring company headed by Miss Percy Haswell. She went on to write at least six more plays. In 1931, Thomas Nelson and Sons published Bible Jingle Rymes, Carter's adaptation of Bible stories into "delightful children's verse".

== Personal life ==
When Carter was 21, she married Frederick Seymour. They had two daughters (the second of whom was named Betty-Lee Carter, like her mother and became an actress) before they separated. By that time Carter was living in Silver City, New Mexico, to which the rest of her family had moved. By 1915, the two had apparently divorced. She had married Cobrun Broun, and they were living in Toronto.

== Partial filmography ==
- The Truth About Women (1924) - Bronson's Mother
- Scandal Street (1925) - Cora Forman
- The Lost Chord (1925) - Phyllis
- The Substitute Wife (1925) - Evelyn Wentworth
- In Borrowed Plumes (1926) - Clara Raymond
- Striving for Fortune (1926)
- Broken Lullaby (1932) - Frau Holderlin
- Are You Listening? (1932) - Mrs. O'Neil (uncredited)
- The Strange Case of Clara Deane (1932) - Couturiere (uncredited)
- Week-End Marriage (1932) - Mrs. Davis
- Stranger in Town (1932) - Mrs. Croaker (uncredited)
- The Last Mile (1932) - Mrs. Walters
- Blondie of the Follies (1932) - Ma Callahan
- Two Against the World (1932) - Mrs. Polansky (scenes deleted)
- Hell's Highway (1932) - Mrs. Ellis
- Trouble in Paradise (1932) - Woman with Wrong Handbag (uncredited)
- I Am a Fugitive from a Chain Gang (1932) - James Allen's Mother
- Tess of the Storm Country (1932) - Mrs. Garfield (uncredited)
- Madame Butterfly (1932) - Suzuki
- The Monkey's Paw (1933) - Mrs. White
- Ladies They Talk About (1933) - Lefty's Landlady (uncredited)
- Jennie Gerhardt (1933) - Mrs. Gerhardt
- Pilgrimage (1933) - Mrs. Rogers
- This Day and Age (1933) - Grace Smith
- Beauty for Sale (1933) - Mrs. Lawson
- Doctor Bull (1933) - Mrs. Ely, New Winton's Gossip (uncredited)
- Footlight Parade (1933) - Old Maid in Elevator in 'Honeymoon Hotel' (uncredited)
- The Right to Romance (1933) - First Face Lift Patient
- East of Fifth Avenue (1933) - Mrs. Mary Lawton
- Beloved (1934) - Mrs. Tarrant
- You're Telling Me! (1934) - Mrs. Bessie Bisbee
- Ready for Love (1934) - Mrs. Sarah Thompson (uncredited)
- Here Is My Heart (1934) - Charity Lady (uncredited)
- The Mystery of Edwin Drood (1935) - Mrs. Crisparkle (uncredited)
- Straight from the Heart (1935) - Mother in Breadline
- Party Wire (1935) - Grandma Kern (uncredited)
- Reckless Roads (1935) - Mrs. Adams
- Rose of the Rancho (1936) - Guadalupe
- Paddy O'Day (1936) - Aunt Jane
- The Bold Caballero (1936) - Indian woman (uncredited)
- The Last Train from Madrid (1937) - Rosa Delgado (uncredited)
- Angel (1937) - Flower Woman (uncredited)
- Inside Story (1939) - Dora
- Unmarried (1939) - Mrs. Charles
- Nancy Drew and the Hidden Staircase (1939) - Miss Floretta Turnbull
- Gone with the Wind (1939) - Bandleader's Wife (uncredited)
- Brother Orchid (1940) - Scrub Woman at End (uncredited) (final film role)

== Bibliography ==
- Tag Gallagher. John Ford: The Man and His Films. University of California Press, 1988.
