= Stanley Price =

American actor (1892–1955)

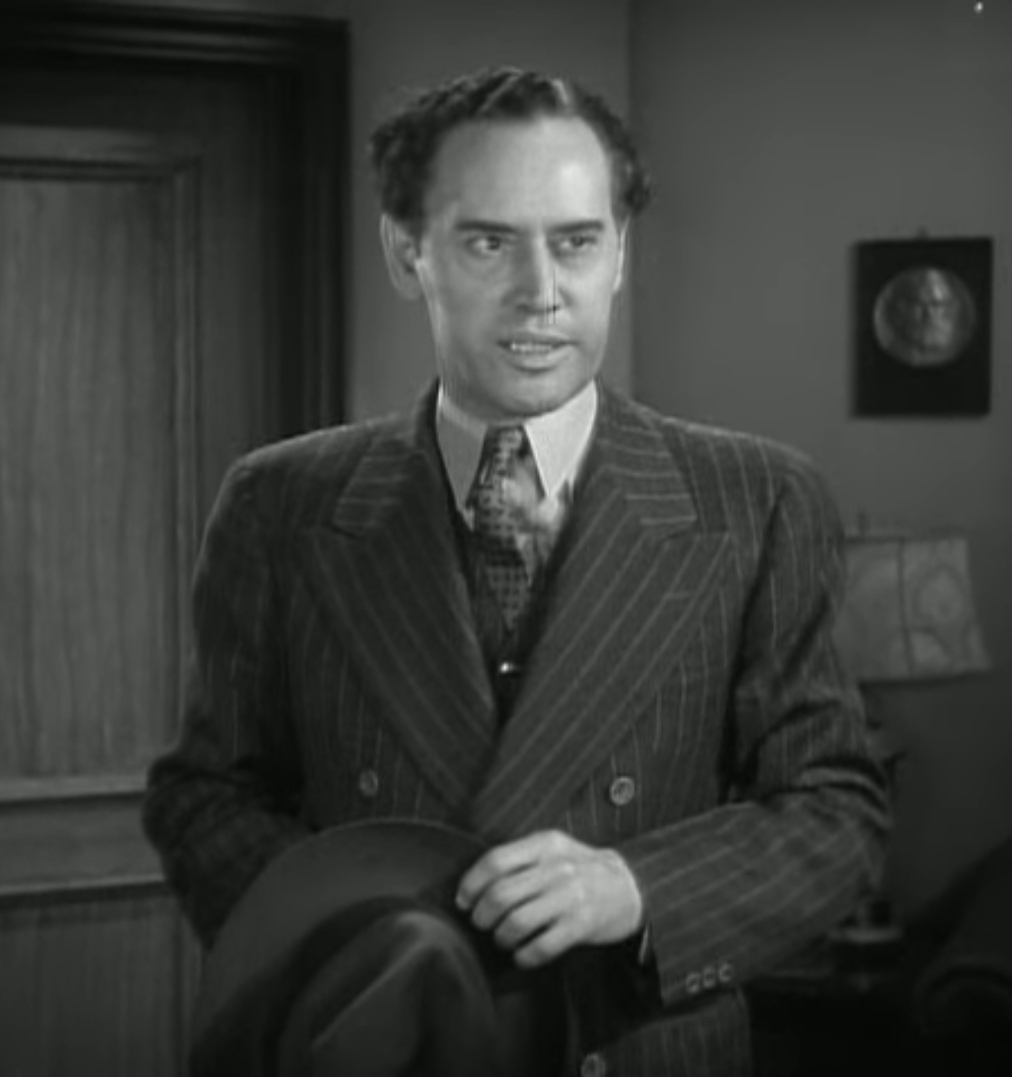
- Price in Adventures of Captain Marvel (1941)
- Born: December 31, 1892; Kansas, U.S.
- Died: July 13, 1955 (aged 62); Garden Grove, California, U.S.
- Resting place: Angelus-Rosedale Cemetery
- Occupation: Actor
- Years active: 1922–1955
- Spouse(s): Frances Severens (m. 19??)
- Children: 2

Stanley Price (December 31, 1892 – July 13, 1955) was an American film supporting actor who appeared in over 200 films between 1922 and 1956. He was a charter member of the Screen Actors Guild.

== Career ==
Price was an actor whose artistic career spanned four different decades, from silents through talkies to the advent of color. He debuted in the silent movie Your Best Friend (William Nigh, 1922), sharing starring duties with Vera Gordon and Harry Benham. After that, he became a familiar figure, wearing either cowboy rustler outfits or gangster nice suits, particularly in the cliffhanger serials of the 1930s through the early 1950s.

Usually, he acted as the assistant or second-in-command for the brains heavy. He usually wore workmanlike duds, did the physical labor, and often had more brawn than morality. Thus, Price went from one chapter to the next trying desperately to kill the hero with fists, knives, guns, bombs or whatever else happened to be handy at the time. Nevertheless, he was another of these loyal henchmen who always seemed to break down and turn cowardly when confronted by the hero.

Eventually, Price was simply a doctor, barkeep, native, reporter, prosecutor, banker, chemist, reporter, psychotic or nobility member, appearing in about 100 westerns and 39 serials. His flair for comedy also was well represented in the film Road to Morocco, as the blithering idiot in the opening bazaar scene, as well in The Three Stooges films Punchy Cowpunchers, Dopey Dicks and Studio Stoops. He played Marshal Charley Blythe in Lippert Studios' West of the Brazos. He also had at least 18 dialogue director credits for Lippert Studios.

== Personal ==
Price was born in Atchison, Kansas. He served in the military in World War I and then acted on stage in the Midwest. He met his wife, Frances Severns, while the two were touring in a production of Abie's Irish Rose. The couple had two children, a son, Stanley Otis, and a daughter, Frances. Price died of a heart attack in Garden Grove, California at age 62. He is buried in Angelus-Rosedale Cemetery in Los Angeles.

== Selected appearances ==
=== Films ===
- Your Best Friend (1922) - Harry Meyers
- Three on a Match (1932) - Ace's Henchman (uncredited)
- Life in the Raw (1933) - Petroff's Henchman (uncredited)
- Her Forgotten Past (1933) - Briggs (uncredited)
- The Miracle Rider (1935, Serial)
- Red Barry (1938, Serial)
- Flash Gordon's Trip to Mars (1938, Serial)
- Daredevils of the Red Circle (1939, Serial)
- Dick Tracy's G-Men (1939, Serial)
- The Golden Trail (1940)
- Meet John Doe (1941)
- Billy the Kid's Fighting Pals (1941)
- Adventures of Captain Marvel (1941, Serial)
- Dick Tracy vs. Crime Inc. (1941, Serial)
- Holt of the Secret Service (1941, Serial)
- Johnny Eager (1942)
- Road to Morocco (1942)
- Outlaws of Pine Ridge (1942)
- Perils of the Royal Mounted (1942, Serial)
- King of the Mounties (1942, Serial)
- Gang Busters (1942, Serial)
- Arizona Stage Coach (1942)
- Wild Horse Rustlers (1943)
- Adventures of the Flying Cadets (1943, Serial)
- G-men vs. the Black Dragon (1943, Serial)
- Batman (1943, Serial)
- The Masked Marvel (1943, Serial)
- The Phantom (1943, Serial)
- Captain America (1944, Serial)
- The Tiger Woman (1944, Serial)
- The Desert Hawk (1944, Serial)
- Black Arrow (1944, Serial)
- Zorro's Black Whip (1944, Serial)
- Crime, Inc. (1945)
- Sunset in El Dorado (1945)
- The Monster and the Ape (1945, Serial)
- Secret Agent X-9 (1945, Serial)
- The Crimson Ghost (1946, Serial)
- Son of Zorro (1947, Serial)
- The Black Widow (1947, Serial)
- Brick Bradford (1947, Serial)
- Superman (1948, Serial)
- Congo Bill (1948, Serial)
- Tough Assignment (1949)
- King of the Rocket Men (1949, Serial)
- Punchy Cowpunchers (1950)
- The Sundowners (1950)
- Dopey Dicks (1950)
- Studio Stoops (1950)
- The Invisible Monster (1950, Serial)
- Pirates of the High Seas (1950, Serial)
- Abilene Trail (1951) - Sheriff Warner
- Man from Sonora (1951) - Henchman Spence
- Dead or Alive (1951) - John Meade - Outlaw
- Roaring City (1951) - Harry Barton
- Blazing Bullets (1951) - Hawkins - Henchman
- Nevada Badmen (1951) - Deputy Ed
- Stagecoach Driver (1951) - Henchman
- Oklahoma Justice (1951) - Bartender
- The Hills of Utah (1951) - Jeffries (uncredited)
- Lawless Cowboys (1951) - Joe
- Texas Lawmen (1951) - Mine Foreman (uncredited)
- Stage to Blue River (1951) - Bill Martin - Postal Inspector (uncredited)
- Wild Stallion (1952)
- Texas City (1952) - 2nd Sergeant (uncredited)
- Night Raiders (1952) - Telegrapher (uncredited)
- Waco (1952) - Sheriff of Waco
- Man from the Black Hills (1952) - Bill Shealey
- Dead Man's Trail (1952) - Blake
- Montana Incident (1952) - Henchman (uncredited)
- Wyoming Roundup (1952) - Clark Jackson
- The Maverick (1952) - Rancher Who Quits (uncredited)
- The Marksman (1953) - Outlaw
- Rebel City (1953) - Herb
- Topeka (1953) - Bank Teller (uncredited)
- Bitter Creek (1954) - Henchman (uncredited)
- The Forty-Niners (1954) - Barfly (uncredited)
- The Desperado (1954) - Witness (uncredited)
- Two Guns and a Badge (1954) - Outlaw (uncredited)
- Perils of the Wilderness (1956) - Henchman Cragg (uncredited)
- The Ten Commandments (1956) - Slave Carrying Load (uncredited)

=== TV-shows ===
- The Adventures of Kit Carson (1954) - Thad Stanton
- Buffalo Bill, Jr. (1955) - Telegrapher
