= Ernest Laszlo =

Hungarian-American cinematographer (1898–1984)

- László Ernő
- Born: April 23, 1898; Budapest, Austria-Hungary
- Died: January 6, 1984 (aged 85); Los Angeles, California, U.S.
- Occupation: Cinematographer
- Years active: 1928–1977
- Title: A.S.C.
- Board member of: A.S.C. President (1973–1975)
- Spouse: Rosa Ellen Nelson (1 daughter)
- Children: Joan Petralia
- Awards: Best Cinematography Ship of Fools 1966

Ernest Laszlo, A.S.C. (born László Ernő; April 23, 1898 – January 6, 1984) was a Hungarian-American cinematographer for over 60 films, and was known for his frequent collaborations with directors Robert Aldrich and Stanley Kramer. He was a member of the American Society of Cinematographers, and was its president from 1972 to 1974. He was an active member of the International Alliance of Theatrical Stage Employees.

== Life and career ==
Born in Budapest, he emigrated to the United States and began working as a camera operator on such silent films as Wings (1927). Between 1927 and 1977, he served as cinematographer on 69 films. Between 1961 and 1976, Laszlo was nominated for eight Academy Awards for Best Cinematography, and won the award in 1966 for Ship of Fools. He died in Los Angeles, California in 1984.

== Selected filmography ==
- The White Outlaw (1929)
- Primrose Path (1931)
- Dear Ruth (1947)
- Road to Rio (1947)
- Lulu Belle (1948)
- Cover Up (1949)
- Impact (1949)
- The Big Wheel (1949)
- The Lucky Stiff (1949)
- Manhandled (1949)
- D.O.A. (1949)
- The Jackie Robinson Story (1950)
- The Well (1951)
- The Star (1952)
- Houdini (1953)
- Stalag 17 (1953)
- Apache (1954)
- Vera Cruz (1954)
- The Naked Jungle (1954)
- The Big Knife (1955)
- Kiss Me Deadly (1955)
- While the City Sleeps (1956)
- Attack of the Puppet People (1958)
- Ten Seconds to Hell (1959)
- Tormented (1960)
- Inherit the Wind (1960), Academy Award nomination
- Judgment at Nuremberg (1961), Academy Award nomination
- It's a Mad, Mad, Mad, Mad World (1963), Academy Award nomination
- Baby the Rain Must Fall (1965)
- Ship of Fools (1965), Academy Award winner
- Fantastic Voyage (1966), Academy Award nomination
- Star! (1968), Academy Award nomination
- Airport (1970), Academy Award nomination
- That's Entertainment! (1974)
- Logan's Run (1976), Academy Award nomination
- The Domino Principle (1977)
