= Virginian Outcast =

1924 silent film

- Directed by: Robert J. Horner
- Produced by: Robert J. Horner
- Starring: Jack Perrin; Marjorie Daw; Otto Lederer
- Production company: Robert J. Horner Productions
- Distributed by: Aywon Film Corporation
- Release date: February 1924
- Running time: 50 minutes
- Country: United States
- Languages: Silent; English intertitles

Virginian Outcast is a 1924 American silent drama film directed by Robert J. Horner and starring Jack Perrin, Marjorie Daw and Otto Lederer.

== Main cast ==
- Jack Perrin as The Stranger
- Marjorie Daw as Madonna Webster
- Otto Lederer as Colonel Webster

== Preservation ==
The film is preserved in the Library of Congress collection.

== Bibliography ==
- Munden, Kenneth White. The American Film Institute Catalog of Motion Pictures Produced in the United States, Part 1. University of California Press, 1997.
