= Marjorie Daw (actress) =

American actress (1902–1979)

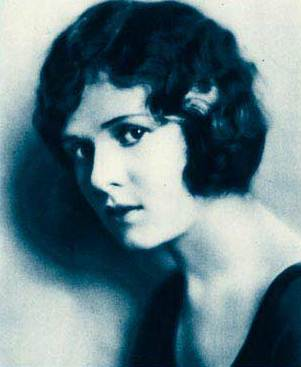
- Daw, 1924
- Born: Marguerite E. House; January 19, 1902; Colorado Springs, Colorado, U.S.
- Died: March 18, 1979 (aged 77); Huntington Beach, California, U.S.
- Occupation: Actress
- Years active: 1914–1929
- Spouses: A. Edward Sutherland (m. 1923; div. 1925) Myron Selznick (m. 1929; div. 1942)
- Children: 1

Marjorie Daw (born Marguerite E. House; January 19, 1902 – March 18, 1979) was an American film actress of the silent film era. She appeared in more than 70 films between 1914 and 1929.

== Career ==
Born in Colorado Springs, Colorado, Daw was the daughter of John H. House. She took her stage name from Marjorie Daw, a short story by Thomas Bailey Aldrich. Daw began acting as a teen to support her younger brother and herself after the death of their parents. She made her film debut in 1914 and worked steadily during the 1920s. She retired from acting after the advent of sound film.

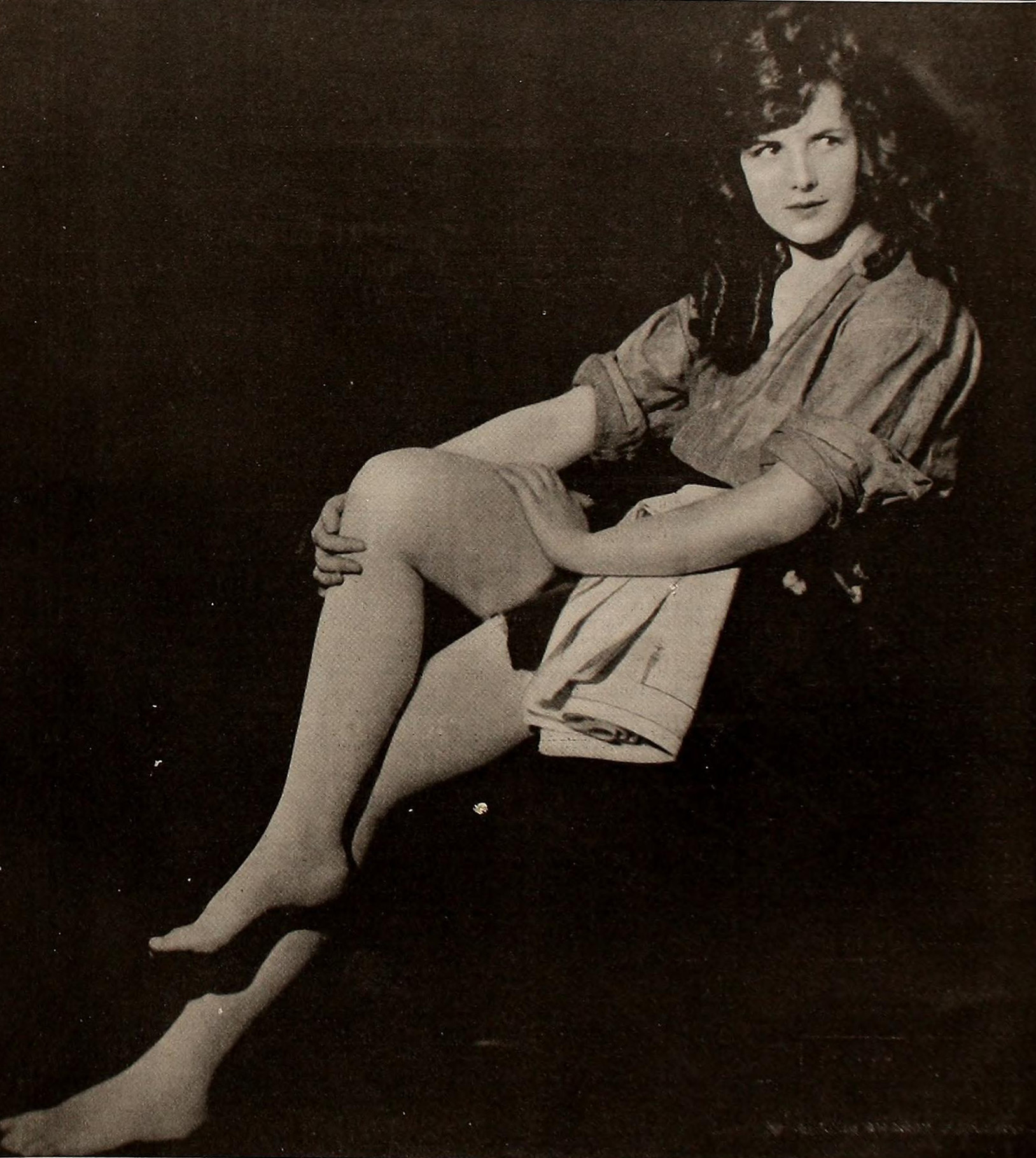
Daw in 1920

== Personal life and death ==
Daw married director Alfred Edward Sutherland on April 20, 1923, in Beverly Hills; They had no children, and they divorced in 1925. On January 23, 1929, Daw married Myron Selznick in New York City. They had a daughter, Joan, and were divorced on April 3, 1942.

Daw died on March 18, 1979, in Huntington Beach, California, aged 77.

== Filmography ==
Year	Title	Role	Notes
1914	The Love Victorious	Youth	Lost film
1915	The Unafraid	Irenya	Alternative title: The Unexpected
1915	The Captive	Peasant Girl	
1915	Hypocrites	Teenage Girl	
1915	The Arab	Village Girl	
1915	The Puppet Crown	Countess Elsa	Lost film
1915	The Secret Orchard	Nanette	Lost film
1915	Out of the Darkness	Jennie Sands	
1915	The Chorus Lady	Nora O'Brian	Lost film
1916	The House with the Golden Windows	A Fairy	Alternative title: The House of the Golden Windows; Lost film
1916	Joan the Woman	Katherine	
1917	The Jaguar's Claws	Nancy Jordan	Lost film
1917	Rebecca of Sunnybrook Farm	Emma Jane Perkins	
1917	Conscience	Madge	Lost film
1917	A Modern Musketeer	Elsie Dodge	
1918	Headin' South	Unknown role	Lost film
1918	Mr. Fix-It	Marjorie Threadwell	
1918	He Comes Up Smiling	Billie Bartlett	
1918	Say! Young Fellow	The Girl	Lost film
1918	The Sunset Princess	Beauty	Lost film
1918	Arizona	Bonita	Lost film
1919	The Knickerbocker Buckaroo	Rita Allison	Lost film
1919	His Majesty, the American	Felice, Countess of Montenac	
1920	Don't Ever Marry	Dorothy Whynn	Lost film
1920	Dinty	Ruth Whitely	
1920	The Great Redeemer	The Girl	Lost film
1920	The River's End	Mary Josephine	Lost film
1921	The Butterfly Girl	Edith Folsom	Lost film
1921	Bob Hampton of Placer	The Kid	Lost film
1921	Experience	Love	Lost film
1921	A Motion to Adjourn	Sally Bleeker	Lost film
1921	Cheated Hearts	Muriel Bekkman	Lost film
1921	Fifty Candles	Mary-Will Tellfair	Lost film
1921	Patsy	Margaret Vincent	
1922	The Lone Hand	Sue De Muidde	Lost film
1922	Love Is an Awful Thing	Helen Griggs	Lost film
1922	A Fool There Was	Nell Winthrop	Lost film
1922	The Long Chance	Kate Corbaly	Lost film
1922	Penrod	Margaret	Lost film
1922	The Sagebrush Trail	Mary Gray	Lost film
1922	The Lying Truth	Sue De Muidde	Lost film
1922	The Pride of Palomar	Kay Parker	
1923	Rupert of Hentzau	Rosa Holf	Lost film
1923	The Call of the Canyon	Flo Hunter	
1923	The Barefoot Boy	Mary Truesdale	Incomplete film
1923	Wandering Daughters	Geraldine Horton	Lost film
1923	The Dangerous Maid	Cecelie Winslow	
1923	Going Up	Grace Douglas	Lost film
1923	Mary of the Movies	Herself	Incomplete film
1924	Human Desires	Joan Thayer	Lost film
1924	Gambling Wives	Ann Forrest	Lost film
1924	Virginian Outcast	Madonna Webster	
1924	Greater Than Marriage	Joan Thursday	Lost film
1924	The Passionate Adventure	Vicky	
1924	Notch Number One	Dorothy Moore	
1924	Revelation	Mademoiselle Brevoort	
1925	One Way Street	Elizabeth Stuart	Lost film
1925	East Lynne	Barbara Hare	
1925	His Master's Voice	Mary Blake	
1925	Fear-Bound	Falfi Tumble	Lost film
1926	The Highbinders	Hope Masterson	
1926	In Borrowed Plumes	Mildred Grantley / Countess D'Autreval	Lost film
1926	Redheads Preferred	Angela Morgan	Lost film
1927	Outlaws of Red River	Mary Torrence	Lost film
1927	Topsy and Eva	Marietta	
1927	Home Made	The Girl	Lost film
1927	Why Girls Say No	Becky	Short film
1927	Buffalo Bill's Last Fight		Short film
1927	Spoilers of the West	Miss Benton	Lost film
1928	The Heart of General Robert E. Lee	Virginia Hale	Short film
1928	The Skywayman	Nancy Feldmore	Short film
1929	The Air Derby		Short film
1929	The Cloud Patrol		Short film
