= The Heart of General Robert E. Lee =

1928 film

- Directed by: R. William Neill
- Written by: Leon Abrams
- Produced by: Herbert T. Kalmus
- Starring: J. Barney Sherry; William Walling; Richard Walling; Marjorie Daw; George Berlinger
- Cinematography: George Cave
- Color process: Two-color technicolor
- Production companies: Metro-Goldwyn-Mayer; Technicolor Corporation
- Distributed by: Metro-Goldwyn-Mayer
- Release date: September 27, 1928
- Country: United States
- Languages: Silent; English Intertitles
- Budget: $18,009.85

The Heart of General Robert E. Lee is a 1928 MGM short silent fictionalized film short in two-color Technicolor. It was the seventh film produced as part of Metro-Goldwyn-Mayer's "Great Events" series.

== Production ==
The film was shot at the Tec-Art Studio in Hollywood.

== Preservation status ==
The film has been preserved in its entirety at the Library of Congress in Washington, DC. The film was, at one point, partially lost, with only the second reel surviving; the first roll was recovered in 2007.
