= Your Best Friend (film) =

1922 silent drama film

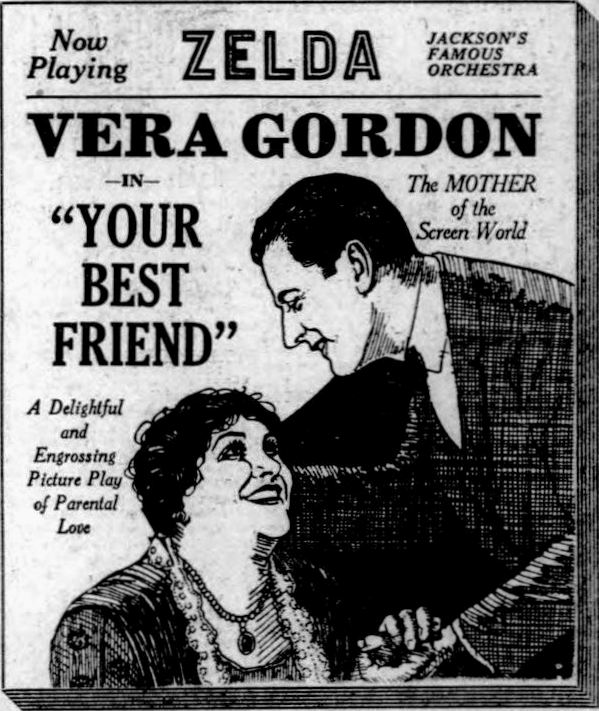
- Newspaper advertisement
- Directed by: William Nigh
- Screenplay by: William Nigh
- Story by: William Nigh
- Produced by: Harry Rapf
- Starring: Vera Gordon; Harry Benham; Stanley Price; Belle Bennett
- Cinematography: John W. Brown; James Diamond; Sidney Hickox
- Production company: Harry Rapf Productions
- Distributed by: Warner Bros.
- Release date: March 26, 1922
- Running time: 70 minutes
- Country: United States
- Language: Silent (English intertitles)
- Budget: $84,000
- Box office: $143,000 (worldwide rentals)

Your Best Friend is a 1922 American silent drama film written and directed by William Nigh. The film stars Vera Gordon, Harry Benham, Stanley Price, and Belle Bennett. The film was released by Warner Bros. on March 26, 1922. It is not known whether the film survives.

== Plot ==
As described in a film magazine, Mrs. Esther Meyers (Gordon) moves from her modest home to one of the elite in the West End. Here she sees her daughter-in-law Aida (Bennett) and the latter's mother (Mason) squander her hard-earned savings on gay parties and teas. When she tries to mother her little niece or become part of her son's household, she is snubbed and rebuffed and called old-fashioned by Aida. Then her son Harry (Price) admits to absconding with a banks funds. To save him from jail, and to save the reputation of her other son Robert (Benham) whose ambition is to become a district attorney, Mrs. Meyers gives up all her money and sells her jewelry to make good the loss. Back to her former home she goes. It is here that a recognition of her true worth comes to Aida and they have a happy reconciliation.

== Cast ==
- Vera Gordon as Mrs. Esther Meyers
- Harry Benham as Robert Meyers
- Stanley Price as Harry Meyers
- Belle Bennett as Aida
- Beth Mason as Aida's Mother
- Dore Davidson as Morris

== Box office ==
According to Warner Bros records, the film earned $132,000 domestically and $11,000 foreign.
