= MGM Grand =

MGM Grand is a casino and hospitality brand owned by MGM Resorts International (formerly MGM Grand, Inc.). It may refer to:

== Hotels and casinos ==
- MGM Grand Las Vegas, opened 1993
  - MGM Grand Garden Arena
  - MGM Grand Adventures Theme Park
- MGM Grand Hotel and Casino, opened 1973, sold 1986, now known as Horseshoe Las Vegas
  - MGM Grand fire, a major disaster that occurred at that hotel in 1980
- MGM Grand Darwin, Northern Territory, Australia, now Skycity Darwin
- MGM Grand Detroit, Michigan
- MGM Grand at Foxwoods, now The Fox Tower, Connecticut
- MGM Grand Macau, China, now MGM Macau
- MGM Grand Reno, Nevada, now Grand Sierra Resort
- MGM Grand Sanya, a property of MGM Resorts International in China

== Other uses ==
- MGM Grand Air, later Champion Air, the former MGM Grand in-house airline
- "MGM Grand", a 2000 song by Grandaddy
