= Melville Shyer =

American film director

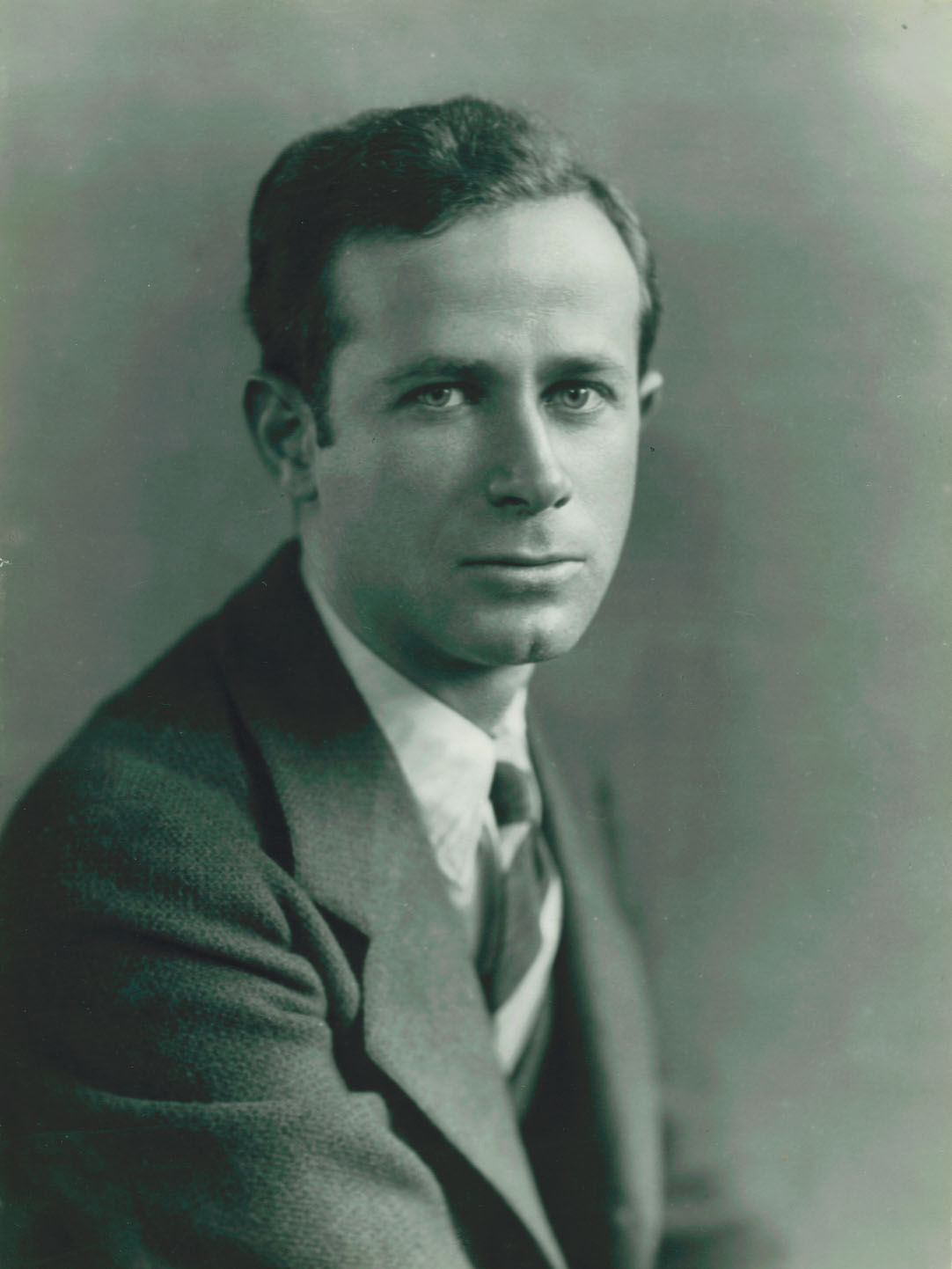
- Shyer in 1937
- Born: Melville Jacob Shyer; September 28, 1895; Chattanooga, Tennessee, U.S.
- Died: September 14, 1968 (aged 72); Palm Springs, California, U.S.
- Occupation(s): Film director, producer, screenwriter
- Spouses: Lois Lorraine Jones (m. 1937, divorced) Marybell C. Langdon (m. 1967)
- Children: Charles Shyer
- Relatives: Hallie Meyers-Shyer (granddaughter)

Melville Jacob Shyer (September 28, 1895 – September 14, 1968) was an American film director, screenwriter and producer and one of the founders of the Directors Guild of America. His career spanned over 50 years, during which he worked with Mack Sennett and D. W. Griffith.

Shyer was born in Chattanooga, Tennessee, the son of Hattie (Schwarzenberg) and Charles Richard Shyer. His family was of German-Jewish background.

His son was writer and director Charles Shyer.

== Filmography ==
=== As director ===
- Sucker Money (1933)
- The Road to Ruin (1934)
- The Murder in the Museum (1934)
- Smashing the Vice Trust (1937) as John Melville
- Mad Youth (1940)
- Souls in Pawn (1940) as John Melville
- Confessions of a Vice Baron (1942)

=== As screenwriter ===
- The Man From Hell (1934)
- Green Eyes (1934)
- Dead Man's Trail (1952)

=== As associate producer ===
- Delinquent Parents (1938)
- Slander House (1938)
- South of Panama (1941)
- Gambling Daughters (1941)

=== As production manager ===
- The House of Secrets (1936)
- Red Lights Ahead (1937)

=== As assistant director ===
- Ladies in Love (1930)
- Today (1930)
- The Lawless Woman (1931)
- Lady From Nowhere (1931)
- The Drifter (1932)
- Cross-Examination (1932)
- The King Murder (1932)
- A Scarlet Week-End (1932)
- Slightly Married (1932)
- Women Won't Tell (1932)
- Secrets of Wu Sin (1932)
- Forgotten (1933)
- Strange People (1933)
- By Appointment Only (1933)
- I Have Lived (After Midnight) (1933)
- Notorious But Nice (1933)
- Dance, Girl, Dance (1933)
- Twin Husbands (1934)
- In Love With Life (1934)
- City Park (1934)
- Fifteen Wives (1934)
- Stolen Sweets (1934)
- One in a Million (1934)
- Fugitive Road (1934)
- Murder on the Campus (1934)
- Port of Lost Dreams (1934)
- The Ghost Walks (1935)
- Sons of Steel (1935)
- A Shot in the Dark (1935)
- Symphony of Living (1935)
- Circumstantial Evidence (1935)
- Condemned to Live (1935)
- Death From a Distance (1935)
- Happiness Came C.O.D. (1935)
- The Lady in Scarlet (1935)
- Tango (1936)
- Ring Around the Moon (1936)
- Murder at Glen Athol (1936)
- The Little Red Schoolhouse (1936)
- Below the Deadline (1936)
- Three of a Kind (1936)
- Easy Money (1936)
- The Dark Hour (1936)
- Missing Girls (1936)
- Arizona Legion (1939)
- Never Give a Sucker an Even Break (1941)
- Unseen Enemy (1942)
- Escape From Hong Kong (1942)
- Frankenstein Meets the Wolf Man (1943)
- Cheyenne Roundup (1943)
- Rhythm of the Islands (1943)
- Captive Wild Woman (1943)
- All By Myself (1943)
- Get Going (1943)
- It Comes Up Love (1943)
- Sherlock Holmes Faces Death (1943)
- Son of Dracula (1943)
- Never a Dull Moment (1943)
- You're a Lucky Fellow, Mr. Smith(1943)
- Sherlock Holmes and the Spider Woman (1944)
- The Scarlet Claw (1944)
- Jungle Woman (1944)
- The Pearl of Death (1944)
- Gypsy Wildcat (1944)
- My Gal Loves Music (1944)
- The House of Fear (1945)
- The Woman in Green (1945)
- The Strange Affair of Uncle Harry (1945)
- Pillow in Death (1945)
- Scarlet Street (1945)
- Blonde Ransom (1945)
- Terror By Night (1946)
- Idea Girl (1946)
- The Cat Creeps (1946)
- Dressed to Kill (1946)
- Inside Job (1946)
- The Killers (A Man Alone) (1946)
- Danger Woman (1946)
- The Beautiful Cheat(1946)
- Smart Politics (1948)
- The Prince of Thieves (1948)
- Smart Woman (1948)
- Music Man (1948)
- Jungle Goddess (1948)
- Thunder in the Pines (1948)
- Highway 13 (1948)
- Henry, the Rainmaker (1949)
- Fighting Fools (1949)
- Bomba, the Jungle Boy (1949)
- Sky Liner (1949)
- Jiggs and Maggie in Jackpot Jitters (1949)
- Deputy Marshal (1949)
- Arson, Inc. (1949)
- Border Incident (1949)
- Joe Palooka Meets Humphrey (1950)
- Everybody's Dancin' (1950)
- I Shot Billy the Kid (1950)
- Gunfire (1950)
- Train to Tombstone (1950)
- Cherokee Uprising (1950)
- Silver Raiders (1950)
- Outlaw Gold (1950)
- Outlaws of Texas (1950)
- Colorado Ambush (1951)
- Abilene Trail (1951)
- Man From Sonora (1951)
- Wanted, Dead or Alive (1951)
- Canyon Raiders (1951)
- Blazing Bullets (1951)
- Cavalry Scout (1951)
- Nevada Badman (1951)
- Stagecoach Driver (1951)
- Oklahoma Justice (1951)
- Whistling Hills (1951)
- Lawless Cowboys (1951)
- The Longhorn (1951)
- Texas Lawmen (1951)
- Stage to Blue River (1951)
- Fargo (1952)
- Wyoming Roundup (1952)
- The Maverick (1952)
- Star of Texas (1953)
- The Homesteaders (1953)
- The Marksman (1953)
- Rebel City (1953)
- Topeka (1953)
- The Fighting Lawman (1953)
- Vigilante Terror (1953)
- Bitter Creek (1954)
- The Forty-Niners (1954)
- The Desperado (1954)
- Two Guns and a Badge (1954)
- The Night Holds Terror (1955)
- Crime in the Streets (1956)
- Beginning of the End (1957)
- Girl With an Itch (1957)
- Creation of the Humanoids (1962)
