= Canyon Ambush =

1952 film by Lewis D. Collins

- Theatrical release poster
- Directed by: Lewis D. Collins
- Written by: Joseph F. Poland
- Produced by: Vincent M. Fennelly
- Starring: Johnny Mack Brown; Lee Roberts; Phyllis Coates; Hugh Prosser; Dennis Moore; Marshall Reed
- Cinematography: Ernest Miller
- Edited by: Sam Fields
- Music by: Raoul Kraushaar
- Production company: Slivermine Productions
- Distributed by: Monogram Pictures
- Release date: October 12, 1952
- Running time: 53 minutes
- Country: United States
- Language: English

Canyon Ambush is a 1952 American Western film directed by Lewis D. Collins, written by Joseph F. Poland and starring Johnny Mack Brown in his last film for Monogram Pictures. The film was released on October 12, 1952.

== Plot ==
Agent Johnny Mack Brown is called to Border City, Wyoming by the U.S. government and ordered to catch a gang of outlaws led by a mysterious masked man who is murdering ranchers and robbing stagecoach drivers. The editor of the town newspaper Marian Gaylord and Sheriff Bob Conway start an anti-crime campaign. Brown discovers that some members of the gang work in the town government and identifies the gang's masked leader.

== Cast ==
- Johnny Mack Brown as Johnny Mack Brown
- Lee Roberts as Bob Conway
- Phyllis Coates as Marian Gaylord
- Hugh Prosser as George Millarde
- Dennis Moore as Henry Lockwood
- Marshall Reed as Macklin
- Denver Pyle as Tom Carlton
- Pierce Lyden as John Brackett
