= Night Raiders (1952 film) =

1952 film by Howard Bretherton

- Directed by: Howard Bretherton
- Written by: Maurice Tombragel
- Produced by: Vincent M. Fennelly
- Starring: Whip Wilson; Fuzzy Knight; Lois Hall
- Cinematography: Ernest Miller
- Edited by: Sam Fields
- Music by: Raoul Kraushaar
- Production company: Silvermine Productions
- Distributed by: Monogram Pictures
- Release date: February 3, 1952
- Running time: 52 minutes
- Country: United States
- Language: English

Night Raiders is a 1952 American Western film directed by Howard Bretherton and starring Whip Wilson, Fuzzy Knight, Lois Hall and Iron Eyes Cody. The film's sets were designed by the art director Martin Obzina.

== Plot ==
Marshal Whip Wilson saves the town from a corrupt sheriff and his goons.

== Cast ==
- Whip Wilson as Marshal Whip Wilson
- Fuzzy Knight as Tex
- Lois Hall as Laura Davis
- Tommy Farrell as Marshal Jim Dugan
- Terry Frost as Mike Lorch
- Lane Bradford as Talbot
- Marshall Reed as Sheriff Ernie Hodkins
- Steve Clark as Charley Davis
- Iron Eyes Cody as Cherokee
- Boyd Stockman as Al
