= Stage to Blue River =

1951 film by Lewis D. Collins

- Theatrical release poster
- Directed by: Lewis D. Collins
- Screenplay by: Joseph F. Poland
- Produced by: Vincent M. Fennelly
- Starring: Whip Wilson; Fuzzy Knight; Phyllis Coates; Lee Roberts; Terry Frost; Lane Bradford
- Cinematography: Ernest Miller
- Edited by: Sam Fields
- Music by: Raoul Kraushaar
- Production company: Monogram Pictures
- Distributed by: Monogram Pictures
- Release date: December 30, 1951
- Running time: 56 minutes
- Country: United States
- Language: English

Stage to Blue River is a 1951 American Western film directed by Lewis D. Collins, written by Joseph F. Poland and starring Whip Wilson, Fuzzy Knight, Phyllis Coates, Lee Roberts, Terry Frost and Lane Bradford. The film was released on December 30, 1951 by Monogram Pictures.

== Cast ==
- Whip Wilson as Whip Wilson
- Fuzzy Knight as Texas
- Phyllis Coates as Joyce Westbrook
- Lee Roberts as Ted Crosby
- Terry Frost as Yarrow
- Lane Bradford as Tom Reardon
- John Hart as Frederick Kingsley
- Pierce Lyden as Sheriff Bill Preston
- Boyd Stockman as Henchman
