= Nevada Badmen =

1951 film by Lewis D. Collins

- Theatrical release poster
- Directed by: Lewis D. Collins
- Screenplay by: Joseph O'Donnell
- Produced by: Vincent M. Fennelly
- Starring: Whip Wilson; Fuzzy Knight; Jim Bannon; I. Stanford Jolley; Phyllis Coates; Marshall Reed
- Cinematography: Ernest Miller
- Edited by: Richard Heermance
- Production company: Frontier Pictures
- Distributed by: Monogram Pictures
- Release date: May 27, 1951
- Running time: 58 minutes
- Country: United States
- Language: English

Nevada Badmen is a 1951 American Western film directed by Lewis D. Collins, written by Joseph O'Donnell and starring Whip Wilson, Fuzzy Knight, Jim Bannon and Phyllis Coates. The film was released on May 27, 1951 by Monogram Pictures.

== Cast ==
- Whip Wilson as Whip Wilson
- Fuzzy Knight as Texas
- Jim Bannon as Jim Bannon
- I. Stanford Jolley as Old Man Waller
- Phyllis Coates as Carol Bannon
- Marshall Reed as Mert Larkin
- Riley Hill as Jess Waller
- Lee Roberts as Clint
- Pierce Lyden as Sheriff Connelly
- Bill Kennedy as Jensen
- Stanley Price as Deputy Ed
- Bud Osborne as Charlie
