= Silver Raiders =

1950 film by Wallace Fox

- Theatrical release poster
- Directed by: Wallace Fox
- Screenplay by: Daniel B. Ullman
- Produced by: Vincent M. Fennelly
- Starring: Whip Wilson; Andy Clyde; Leonard Penn; Virginia Herrick; Dennis Moore; Patricia Rios
- Cinematography: Harry Neumann
- Edited by: Richard Heermance
- Production company: Monogram Pictures
- Distributed by: Monogram Pictures
- Release date: October 20, 1950
- Running time: 55 minutes
- Country: United States
- Language: English

Silver Raiders is a 1950 American Western film directed by Wallace Fox and written by Daniel B. Ullman. The film stars Whip Wilson, Andy Clyde, Leonard Penn, Virginia Herrick, Dennis Moore and Patricia Rios. The film was released on October 20, 1950, by Monogram Pictures.

== Cast ==
- Whip Wilson as Larry Grant
- Andy Clyde as J. Quincy Jones
- Leonard Penn as Lance Corbin
- Virginia Herrick as Patricia Jones
- Dennis Moore as Greg Boland
- Patricia Rios as Dolores Alvarez
- Reed Howes as George Barnes
- Riley Hill as Bill Harris
- Marshall Reed as Horn
- George DeNormand as Clark
- Kermit Maynard as Hank Larkin
