= Fighting Lawman =

1953 film directed by Thomas Carr

- Directed by: Thomas Carr
- Written by: Daniel B. Ullman
- Produced by: Vincent M. Fennelly
- Starring: Wayne Morris; Virginia Grey; John Kellogg; Harry Lauter
- Cinematography: Gilbert Warrenton
- Edited by: Sam Fields
- Music by: Raoul Kraushaar
- Production company: Westwood Productions
- Distributed by: Allied Artists Pictures
- Release date: September 20, 1953
- Running time: 71 minutes
- Country: United States
- Language: English

Fighting Lawman is a 1953 American Western film directed by Thomas Carr, produced by Vincent M. Fennelly, and written by Daniel B. Ullman. It stars Wayne Morris, Virginia Grey, John Kellogg, and Harry Lauter.

== Cast ==
- Wayne Morris as Deputy Marshal Jim Burke
- Virginia Grey as Raquel Jackson
- John Kellogg as Lem Slade, aka Sam Logan
- Harry Lauter as Outlaw Al Clark - aka Al Deacons
- John Pickard as Jack Harvey aka Jack Martin
- Rick Vallin as Manuel Jackson
- Myron Healey as Sheriff Dave Wilson
- Dick Rich as Webb

== Bibliography ==
- Martin, Len D. The Allied Artists Checklist: The Feature Films and Short Subjects of Allied Artists Pictures Corporation, 1947-1978. McFarland & Company, 1993.
