= Cherokee Uprising (film) =

1950 film by Lewis D. Collins

- Theatrical release poster
- Directed by: Lewis D. Collins
- Screenplay by: Daniel B. Ullman
- Produced by: Vincent M. Fennelly
- Starring: Whip Wilson; Andy Clyde; Lois Hall; Sam Flint; Forrest Taylor; Marshall Reed; Iron Eyes Cody; Chief Yowlachie
- Cinematography: Gilbert Warrenton
- Edited by: Richard Heermance
- Production company: Monogram Pictures
- Distributed by: Monogram Pictures
- Release date: October 8, 1950
- Running time: 57 minutes
- Country: United States
- Language: English

Cherokee Uprising is a 1950 American Western film directed by Lewis D. Collins and written by Daniel B. Ullman. The film stars Whip Wilson, Andy Clyde, Lois Hall, Sam Flint, Forrest Taylor, Marshall Reed, Iron Eyes Cody and Chief Yowlachie. It was released on October 8, 1950 by Monogram Pictures.

== Cast ==
- Whip Wilson as Bob Foster
- Andy Clyde as Jake Jones
- Lois Hall as Mary Lou Harrison
- Sam Flint as Judge Harrison
- Forrest Taylor as William Welch
- Marshall Reed as Sheriff Joe Conger
- Iron Eyes Cody as Longknife
- Chief Yowlachie as Gray Eagle
- Lee Roberts as Kansas
- Stanley Price as Smokey
- Lyle Talbot as Chief Marshal
- Edith Mills as Mrs. Strongbow
