= Vigilante Terror =

1953 film by Lewis D. Collins

- Theatrical release poster
- Directed by: Lewis D. Collins
- Written by: Sidney Theil
- Produced by: Vincent M. Fennelly
- Starring: Wild Bill Elliott; Mary Ellen Kay; Robert Bray; I. Stanford Jolley; Henry Rowland; Myron Healey
- Cinematography: Ernest Miller
- Edited by: Sam Fields
- Music by: Raoul Kraushaar
- Production company: Allied Artists Pictures
- Distributed by: Allied Artists Pictures
- Release date: November 15, 1953
- Running time: 70 minutes
- Country: United States
- Language: English

Vigilante Terror is a 1953 American Western film directed by Lewis D. Collins and written by Sidney Theil. The film stars Wild Bill Elliott, Mary Ellen Kay, Robert Bray, I. Stanford Jolley, Henry Rowland and Myron Healey. The film was released on November 15, 1953, by Allied Artists Pictures.

== Plot ==
Things have gotten so bad that the citizens of Pinetop have formed a vigilante committee to maintain order, but the Brewer gang continues to operate. Tack Hamlin (Wild Bill Elliott) comes to town and is soon recruited for sheriff, and he gets right to work, trying to stop both the bandits and the masked vigilantes. Turns out that Brett (Myron Healey), who owns the saloon, leads both the outlaws and the vigilantes, and is planting false evidence on others to divert suspicion from himself.

== Cast ==
- Wild Bill Elliott as Tack Hamlin
- Mary Ellen Kay as Lucy Taylor
- Robert Bray as Gene Smith
- I. Stanford Jolley as Matt Taylor
- Henry Rowland as Mayor Winch
- Myron Healey as Brett
- George D. Wallace as Brewer
- Fuzzy Knight as Strummer Jones
- Zon Murray as Bill
- Richard Avonde as Artie
- Michael Colgan as Jamison
- Denver Pyle as Sperry
- Lee Roberts as Wilson
- John James as Jed
