= Wyoming Roundup =

1952 film by Thomas Carr

- Theatrical release poster
- Directed by: Thomas Carr
- Written by: Daniel B. Ullman
- Produced by: Vincent M. Fennelly
- Starring: Whip Wilson; Tommy Farrell; Phyllis Coates; Richard Emory; Robert J. Wilke; I. Stanford Jolley
- Cinematography: Ernest Miller; Charles Van Enger
- Edited by: Sam Fields
- Music by: Raoul Kraushaar
- Production company: Silvermine Productions
- Distributed by: Monogram Pictures
- Release date: November 9, 1952
- Running time: 53 minutes
- Country: United States
- Language: English

Wyoming Roundup is a 1952 American Western film directed by Thomas Carr and written by Daniel B. Ullman. The film stars Whip Wilson in his final leading role, Tommy Farrell, Phyllis Coates, Richard Emory, Robert J. Wilke and I. Stanford Jolley. The film was released on November 9, 1952, by Monogram Pictures.

== Plot ==
Whip and Bob ride into Willow, Wyoming looking for work as cowhands. With the beef market dormant the pair are hired as lawmen to replace a murdered town marshal and prevent a range war.

== Cast ==
- Whip Wilson as Whip Wilson
- Tommy Farrell as Bob Burke
- Phyllis Coates as Terry Howard
- Richard Emory as Jack Craven
- Robert J. Wilke as Clem Wyatt
- I. Stanford Jolley as Earl Craven
- House Peters Jr. as Kent Randolph
- Henry Rowland as Bill Howard
- Stanley Price as Clark Jackson
- Lyle Talbot as Franklin
- Frank Jaquet as Doctor
- Rocky Shahan as Stagecoach Driver
