= Lawless Cowboys =

1951 film by Lewis D. Collins

- Theatrical release poster
- Directed by: Lewis D. Collins
- Screenplay by: Maurice Tombragel
- Produced by: Vincent M. Fennelly
- Starring: Whip Wilson; Fuzzy Knight; Jim Bannon; Lee Roberts; Pamela Duncan; I. Stanford Jolley
- Cinematography: Ernest Miller
- Edited by: Sam Fields
- Production company: Monogram Pictures
- Distributed by: Monogram Pictures
- Release date: November 7, 1951
- Running time: 58 minutes
- Country: United States
- Language: English

Lawless Cowboys is a 1951 American Western film directed by Lewis D. Collins, written by Maurice Tombragel and starring Whip Wilson, Fuzzy Knight, Jim Bannon, Lee Roberts, Pamela Duncan and I. Stanford Jolley. The film was released on November 7, 1951 by Monogram Pictures.

== Plot ==
The town council discusses the upcoming rodeo, fearing that several riders are accepting gamblers' bribes to intentionally lose. Rodeo rider and secret investigator Whip Wilson and his friend Jim Bannon operate undercover to trap the crooks.

== Cast ==
- Whip Wilson as Whip Wilson
- Fuzzy Knight as Horace Greeley Smithers
- Jim Bannon as Jim Bannon
- Lee Roberts as Cory Hanson
- Pamela Duncan as Nora Clayton
- I. Stanford Jolley as Sheriff
- Bruce Edwards as Bob Rank
- Richard Avonde as Ace Malloy
- Marshall Reed as Paul Maxwell
- Pierce Lyden as Rusty
- Richard Emory as Jeff
- Stanley Price as Joe
