= Man from the Black Hills =

1952 film by Thomas Carr

- Directed by: Thomas Carr
- Written by: Joseph O'Donnell
- Produced by: Vincent M. Fennelly
- Starring: Johnny Mack Brown; James Ellison; Rand Brooks
- Cinematography: Ernest Miller
- Edited by: Sam Fields
- Music by: Raoul Kraushaar
- Production company: Silvermine Productions
- Distributed by: Monogram Pictures
- Release date: March 30, 1952
- Running time: 58 minutes
- Country: United States
- Language: English

Man from the Black Hills is a 1952 American Western film directed by Thomas Carr and starring Johnny Mack Brown, James Ellison and Rand Brooks.

== Cast ==
- Johnny Mack Brown as Johnny Mack Brown
- James Ellison as Jim Fallon
- Rand Brooks as Fake Jimmy Fallon
- Lane Bradford as Sheriff Moran
- I. Stanford Jolley as Pete Ingram
- Stanley Andrews as Pop Fallon
- Denver Pyle as Glenn Hartley
- Ray Bennett as Hugh Delaney
- Robert Bray as Ed Roper
- Florence Lake as Martha
- Stanley Price as Bill Shealey
- Joel Allen as Deputy Bates

== Bibliography ==
- Bernard A. Drew. Motion Picture Series and Sequels: A Reference Guide. Routledge, 2013.
