= Arizona Territory (film) =

1949 American western film

- Theatrical release poster
- Directed by: Wallace Fox
- Screenplay by: Adele Buffington
- Produced by: Vincent M. Fennelly
- Starring: Whip Wilson; Andy Clyde; Nancy Saunders; Dennis Moore; John Merton; Carol Henry
- Cinematography: Harry Neumann
- Edited by: Richard Heermance
- Production company: Monogram Pictures
- Distributed by: Monogram Pictures
- Release date: July 2, 1950
- Running time: 56 minutes
- Country: United States
- Language: English

Arizona Territory is a 1950 American Western film directed by Wallace Fox and written by Adele Buffington. The film stars Whip Wilson, Andy Clyde, Nancy Saunders, Dennis Moore, John Merton and Carol Henry. It was released on July 2, 1950 by Monogram Pictures.

== Plot ==
While driving her wagon, Doris Devin is shot and wounded. She loses control of the wagon, which is stopped by Whip Wilson. When searching for the assailant, Whip uncovers a counterfeiting ring.

== Cast ==
- Whip Wilson as Jeff Malloy
- Andy Clyde as Luke Watson
- Nancy Saunders as Doris Devin
- Dennis Moore as Greg Lance
- John Merton as Otis Kilburn
- Carol Henry as Joe
- Carl Mathews as Steve Cramer
- Frank Austin as Jud
- Bud Osborne as Stableman
