= Lyle Talbot =

American actor (1902–1996)

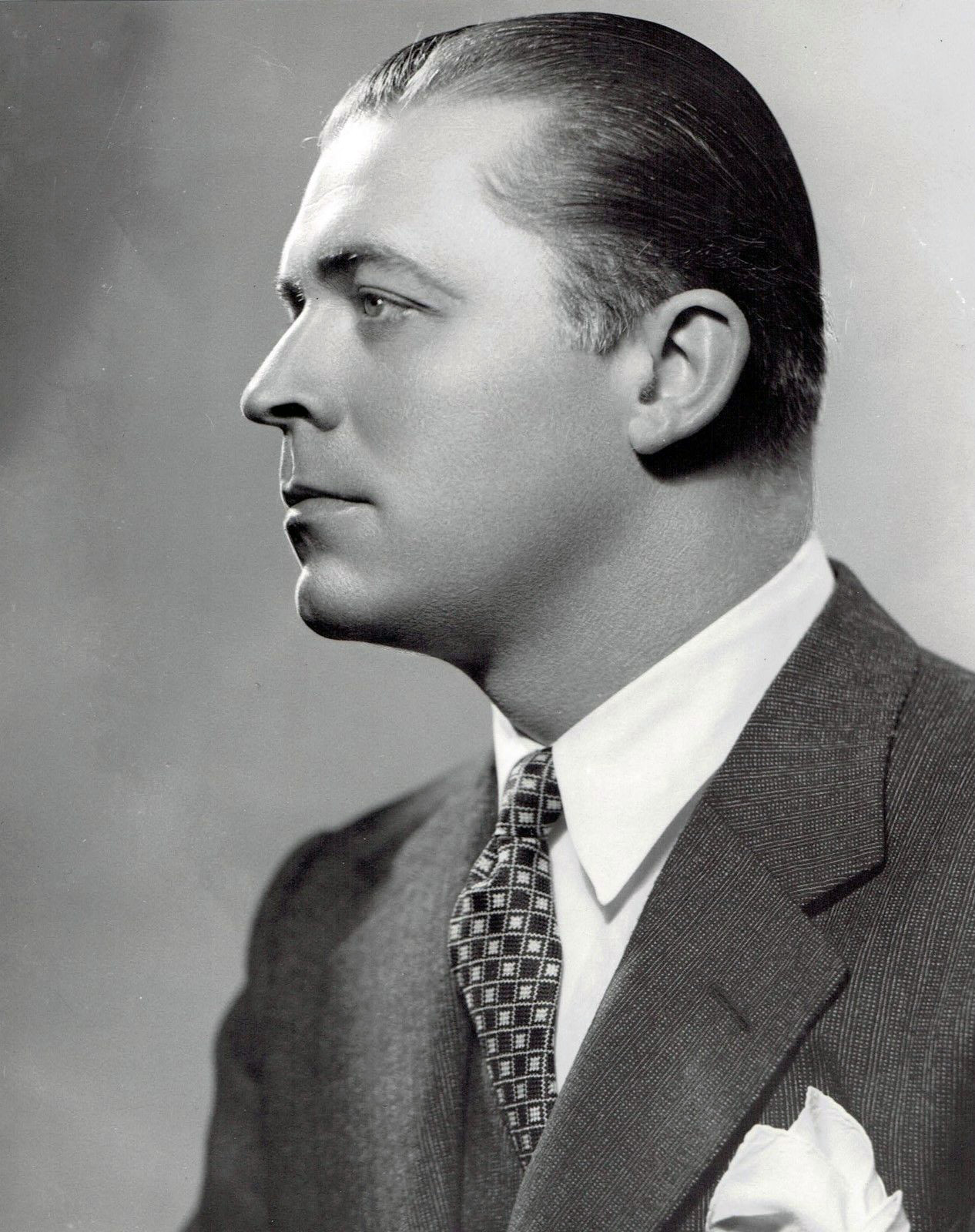
- Talbot in 1947
- Born: Lisle Henderson; February 8, 1902; Pittsburgh, Pennsylvania, U.S.
- Died: March 2, 1996 (aged 94); San Francisco, California, U.S.
- Occupation: Actor
- Years active: 1927–1987
- Spouses: Elaine Melchior (m. 1930; div. 1930) Marguerite Ethel Cramer (m. 1937; div. 1940) Abigail Adams (m. 1942; ann. 1942) Keven McClure (m. 1946; div. 1947) Margaret Epple (aka Paula Deaven) (m. 1948; died 1989)
- Children: 4, including David Talbot; Margaret Talbot; Stephen Talbot

Lyle Talbot (born Lisle Henderson, also credited Lysle Talbot; February 8, 1902 – March 2, 1996) was an American stage, screen and television actor. His career in films spanned three decades, from 1931 to 1960, and he performed on a wide variety of television series from the early 1950s to the late 1980s. Among his notable roles on television was his portrayal of Ozzie Nelson's friend and neighbor Joe Randolph, a character he played for ten years on the ABC sitcom The Adventures of Ozzie and Harriet.

Talbot began his film career under contract with Warner Bros. during the early years of the sound era. Ultimately, he appeared in more than 175 productions with various studios, first as a young matinee idol, then as the star of many B movies, and later as a character actor. Notably, he gave the first live-action portrayals of two iconic DC Comics characters: Commissioner Gordon and Lex Luthor.

He was a founding member of the Screen Actors Guild and served on that organization's first board of directors. His long career is recounted in the 2012 book The Entertainer: Movies, Magic and My Father's Twentieth Century by his youngest daughter Margaret Talbot, a staff writer for The New Yorker. (Note: A full online copy of Margaret Talbot's 2012 biographical work The Entertainer: Movies, Magic and My Father's Twentieth Century is available for reading on the Internet Archive.)

== Early life ==
Talbot was born in Pittsburgh, Pennsylvania, the only child of Florence May (née Talbot) and Joel Edward Henderson, both natives of Nebraska. In May 1902, just three months after Lyle's birth, Florence died at her mother's home in Brainard, Nebraska, from complications attributed to typhoid fever. Lyle was then raised in Brainard by his widowed grandmother, Mary Talbot (nee Mary Hollywood), who legally changed her infant grandson's surname from Henderson to her own married name and added "Florenz" as his middle name in memory of her daughter. Later, as a teenager, Talbot moved with his grandmother to Omaha, Nebraska. There he graduated from high school before leaving home at age 17 to work as a hypnotist's assistant, part-time magician, and as an actor, entertaining audiences at traveling tent shows and in theatres across the American Midwest.

== Film career ==
After gaining years of stage experience in his travels, Talbot in 1929 established his own theatre company, "The Talbot Players", in Memphis, Tennessee, where he hired his father and stepmother, Anna Henderson, to be among the company's roster of performers. At the end of 1931, however, Talbot decided to move to California to find more lucrative acting opportunities in motion pictures. He already had some experience, though very limited, in performing on screen, namely in small roles in a few shorts, which included a bit part as a gangster in The Nightingale (1931) and playing a police captain in The Clyde Mystery (1931). (Note: In the online reference Internet Movie Database (IMDb), a filmography for Lyle Talbot includes the 1928 silent film The Godless Girl, citing Talbot in the uncredited role of an "Inmate barber" in that production; however, a review of that film available on YouTube and posted by "Big list of cinema" under the title "The Godless Girl 1929 [sic] Cecil B DeMille" shows that the performer playing the noted barber (beginning at time mark 00:32:25) is clearly not Talbot. The Godless Girl was released by Warner Bros. in two versions: a silent version in 1928 and a rudimentary "goat gland" sound version in 1929.) Both of those low-budget, two-reel shorts were filmed in New York City and produced by Warner Bros. in affiliation with Vitaphone in Brooklyn.

=== Move to Hollywood, 1932 ===
Talbot's arrival in California at the beginning of 1932 proved to be ideal timing, for Hollywood was still in the formative years of the sound era, when studios remained busy searching for potential leading actors who were not only engaging performers, but also had acceptable voices and articulate speech patterns for the early audio technologies being used and refined on film sets. Talbot possessed those qualities, for his screen test at Warner Bros. went well despite the fact that the scene Talbot performed was from a play that satirized the studio's production chief Darryl F. Zanuck. It also impressed one of the studio's top directors, "Wild Bill" William Wellman, who immediately wanted to cast the 30-year-old actor in his upcoming film Love Is a Racket. Talbot quickly accepted Zanuck's offer to join the company's growing ranks of contract players, who included the rising stars Bette Davis and Humphrey Bogart. Just prior to his work in Love Is a Racket, Talbot appeared as a major supporting character, Dr. Jerome Preston, in Unholy Love, a drama produced by Warner Bros. in cooperation with Albert Ray Productions. (Note: A full digital copy of Unholy Love is available for viewing on YouTube under the search title "Unholy Love (1932) PRE-CODE HOLLYWOOD".)

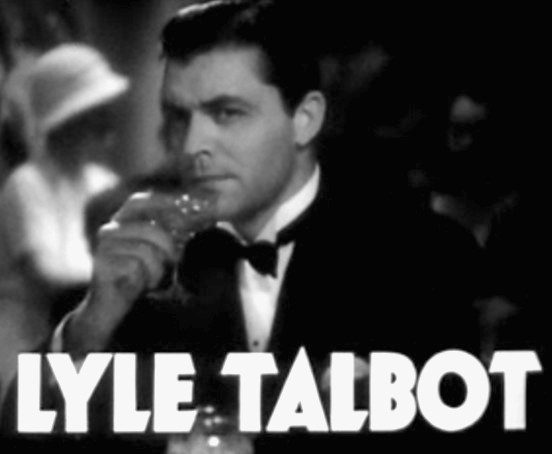
Frame from trailer for Havana Widows (1933).

Some other notable films in which Talbot was cast in his first years at Warner Bros. are Three on a Match (1932), 20,000 Years in Sing Sing (1932) with Spencer Tracy, College Coach (1933) with Pat O'Brien and Dick Powell, Mary Stevens, M.D. (1933) and Mandalay (1934) with Kay Francis, and Ladies They Talk About (1933) with Barbara Stanwyck. He continued to perform in a variety of co-starring roles, such as romancing Mae West in Go West, Young Man (1936), pursuing opera star Grace Moore in One Night of Love (1934), and playing a bank robber on the run in Heat Lightning (1934).

He appeared opposite an array of stars during his career, including Bette Davis, Ann Dvorak, Carole Lombard, Barbara Stanwyck, Mary Astor, Ginger Rogers, Loretta Young, Kay Francis, Glenda Farrell, Joan Blondell, Marion Davies, and Shirley Temple. He also shared the screen with Humphrey Bogart, Spencer Tracy and Tyrone Power. Overall in the course of his entertainment career, Talbot performed in over 175 films.

=== "The 42nd Street Special" and "cheap socks" ===
Early in his career at Warner Bros., Talbot took part in one of Hollywood's most extravagant and ambitious publicity events, a five-week rail trip in 1933 across the United States with Bette Davis, Preston Foster, Leo Carrillo, Glenda Farrell, cowboy star Tom Mix, Olympic swimmer Eleanor Holm, comedian Joe E. Brown, and a chorus line of Busby Berkeley dancers. The established studio celebrities and rising stars and personnel traveled aboard "The 42nd Street Special," a passenger train that was elaborately decorated in silver and gold leaf and trimmed with electric lights. Stopping at dozens of cities along their journey, the Hollywood travelers widely promoted Warners' new Busby Berkeley musical 42nd Street. They also took the opportunity when the train paused in Washington, D.C., on March 4, 1933, to attend the first inauguration of Franklin Delano Roosevelt as a show of the studio's support for the nation's new president. Days later, after arriving in New York City on March 9, the train returned to California. In the extensive news coverage of The 42nd Street Special's itinerary, Talbot—already divorced from a brief marriage in 1930—was described in reports as the train's "Railway Romeo" and as being "'handsome as hell'" and "'likable as a collie.'" Warner Bros. was evidently very pleased with his performances for the studio, both on- and off-set, for during the publicity excursion, the New York-based trade paper The Film Daily reports on March 1, "Lyle Talbot, now on the '42nd Street' special train touring the country, has been placed under long-term contract by Warners."

The monthly movie-fan magazine Photoplay profiled Talbot in its March 1933 issue, distributing it to its subscribers and newsstands at the same time the 42nd Street Special was still touring the nation. Written by Sara Hamilton and titled "Born to be a Villain But Lyle Talbot wishes they would let him go straight", the article provided readers with some insight into the popular actor's general lifestyle at the time, along with some details about his early life and personal preferences, right down to his "cheap socks":

Usually the villain in his screen roles, Lyle Talbot is probably the most unvillain-like person in Hollywood. He's a quiet, unassuming young man with a bright Irish wit, (Note: Though his American father was of Scottish descent, Talbot did have Irish heritage. Lyle's maternal grandmother Mary Hollywood Talbot was born in County Cork, Ireland, on March 17, 1857. At the age of twelve she immigrated to the United States with her Irish parents and many siblings. Her daughter Florence was Lyle's mother.) who lives alone in a modest flat with his dog, likes golf and tennis and goes bicycle riding every chance he gets. He cares little for publicity ballyhoo and wants to spread his career out over a period of years, rather than have it burst into a sudden skyrocket of flame and then die out...
He's five feet, eleven and a half inches tall; weighs 172 pounds, has brown hair and blue eyes that a girl would give anything to possess. He has grand taste in clothes, his ties, socks and shirts always blending.
He is never seen where actors are usually seen. He drives a Ford, loves filet of sole, and his pet economy is cheap socks. He loathes people who talk too much. Lyle himself talks well and at length. He's made fourteen pictures in eight months and frets considerably about the villain thing. He never wants to be just a nice young hero but he would like to be a little nice on the screen for a change. He's not married and he's twenty-nine years old. (Note: Talbot in March 1933 was 31 years old, not 29 as mentioned in his cited March 1933 profile in Photoplay. In the 1930s, reducing or "shaving" a few years off an actor's true age was still not an uncommon occurrence in the publicity material distributed by studio offices and then repeated in trade publications or by the actors themselves.)

=== SAG and later films ===
Back in Hollywood after the 1933 publicity tour and working long hours six days a week, Talbot in July 1933 decided to become a member of the first board of directors of the Screen Actors Guild. His activism in SAG union affairs reportedly hurt his career. In 1936, Warner Bros. dropped his contract, which immediately affected Talbot's acting opportunities. He seldom received starring roles again, although he continued to find steady work as a capable character actor, often playing the "other man", affable neighbors, or crafty villains with equal finesse. Talbot's supporting roles spanned the gamut, as he played cowboys, pirates, detectives, street cops, surgeons, psychiatrists, soldiers, judges, newspaper editors, storekeepers, and boxers. In reflecting on his career during a 1984 interview with the Los Angeles Times, he stated, "'It's really simple, I never turned down a job, not one...ever.'" Such universal acceptance of acting offers led to his performing in, as Talbot himself described them in the same Times interview, "'some real stinkers'". Those films include three by Ed Wood that are now distinguished in American cinematic history for their extraordinarily low production values: Glen or Glenda (1953), Jail Bait (1954), and a motion picture often cited by media reviewers as the "'worst film ever made'", Plan 9 from Outer Space (1959). Talbot also worked with the Three Stooges in Gold Raiders (1951) and played villains in four comedies with The Bowery Boys.

Talbot was notable too for being the first live-action actor to play two prominent DC Comics characters on-screen: Commissioner Gordon in Batman and Robin, and supervillain Lex Luthor in Atom Man vs. Superman (who at the time was simply known as Luthor). Talbot began a longstanding tradition of actors in these roles that were most recently (as of 2026) filled by Jeffrey Wright and Nicholas Hoult, respectively. He also had a role on The Vigilante movie serial too for the original Vigilante Greg Saunders, again for DC Comics

In 1960, after an absence of more than 20 years, Talbot returned to the Warner Bros. big screen, appearing in the Franklin D. Roosevelt bio-pic, Sunrise at Campobello written by Dore Schary and starring Ralph Bellamy. It was Talbot's penultimate film appearance.

== Television, 1950s–1980s ==
Although Talbot once starred in the film Trapped by Television (1936), the invention of TV actually revived his acting career after the quality of his movie roles began to decline. Talbot was a frequent presence on American television from the 1950s well into the 1970s with occasional appearances in the 1980s. From 1955 to 1966, he regularly appeared in episodes of The Adventures of Ozzie and Harriet as neighbor Joe Randolph. He also had a recurring role (1955–58) as Paul Fonda in numerous episodes of The Bob Cummings Show.

Talbot also acted in a variety of early television Westerns. He played Colonel Billings three times on The Adventures of Kit Carson (1951–1955), appeared four times as a judge on the syndicated series The Cisco Kid, guest-starred in four episodes of Gene Autry's The Range Rider in 1952 and 1953, was cast five times in different roles on The Lone Ranger between 1950 and 1955, and played Sheriff Clyde Chadwick in the 1959 episode "The Sanctuary" on Colt .45, and the episode "Two Tickets to Ten Strike" on Maverick in 1959. In the 1950s and beyond, he performed as well in a wide range of other drama and comedy programs. In 1955 he portrayed the character Baylor in six episodes or "chapters" of the early sci-fi series Commando Cody: Sky Marshal of the Universe. From 1953 to 1957, he was cast as different characters in four episodes of the anthology series Lux Video Theatre. In 1967, he played Colonel Blake three times on The Beverly Hillbillies and appeared three times between 1965 and 1971 on Green Acres. On one episode of Green Acres in 1969, Talbot played himself but in the fictional role of a senator, spoofing actors such as Ronald Reagan who actually became politicians later in their careers.

Some examples of other series on which Talbot made guest appearances include Annie Oakley; It's a Great Life, Leave it to Beaver, Public Defender; The Pride of the Family; Crossroads; Hey, Jeannie!; The George Burns and Gracie Allen Show; Broken Arrow; The Millionaire; Richard Diamond, Private Detective; Tales of Wells Fargo; Buckskin; Cimarron City; Maverick; Angel; Hawaiian Eye; 77 Sunset Strip; Surfside 6; The Roaring 20s; The Restless Gun; Stagecoach West; The Red Skelton Show; The Lucy Show, The Adventures of Wild Bill Hickok; Topper; The Adventures of Rin Tin Tin; Laredo; Perry Mason; The Real McCoys; Rawhide; Wagon Train; Charlie's Angels; Newhart; The Dukes of Hazzard; St. Elsewhere; Adam-12; and Who's the Boss?.

Talbot continued to act on television into the 1980s. He also narrated at that time two televised PBS biographies, The Case of Dashiell Hammett (1982) and World Without Walls (1986) about pioneering female pilot Beryl Markham. Both PBS programs were produced and written by his son Stephen Talbot, a former child actor who portrayed the recurring character Gilbert Bates on Leave It to Beaver, another series on which his father performed in several episodes.

== Return to the stage ==
Having started his career in the theatre and later co-starred on Broadway in 1940–1941 in Separate Rooms with Glenda Farrell and Alan Dinehart, Talbot returned to the stage in the 1960s and 1970s. He co-starred in national road company versions of Thornton Wilder's The Matchmaker with Ann B. Davis; Gore Vidal's The Best Man with Hugh Marlowe and K.T. Stevens; Neil Simon's The Odd Couple with Harvey Stone and Barefoot in the Park with Virginia Mayo; and Arthur Sumner Long's play Never Too Late with Penny Singleton (who played "Blondie" in the movies.)

He also was featured in non-singing roles in a number of musicals, including Los Angeles and San Francisco Civic Light Opera Company 1964 productions of Cole Porter's "Kiss Me, Kate," with Patrice Munsel (he played her suitor, General Harrison Howell). Talbot appeared as Captain Brackett in a 1967 revival of South Pacific at (Lincoln Center) starring Florence Henderson and Giorgio Tozzi.

Throughout the '60s and'70s and into the '80s, Talbot was a frequent guest star in productions of "My Fair Lady" as Colonel Pickering and "Camelot" as King Pellinore at the Music Circus in Sacramento, California.

In 1962, Talbot directed and co-starred with Ozzie and Harriet Nelson and a young Sally "Hot Lips" Kellerman in Marriage Go Round, a play Talbot and the Nelsons took on the road again in the early 1970s.

He also starred in the Preston Jones drama, "The Last Meeting of the Knights of the White Magnolia," at the Alley Theatre in Houston and the Chicago area Lincolnshire Theater.

== Personal life and death ==
Talbot had many romantic entanglements and several brief marriages to Elaine Melchoir (1930), Marguerite Cramer (1937–1940), Abigail Adams (1942), and Keven "Eve" McClure (1946–1947) who next married novelist Henry Miller. Talbot married for the fifth and final time in 1948 to Margaret Epple, a young actress and singer who adopted the name "Paula" and sometimes went by the stage names of "Paula Deaven" or "Margaret Abbott." She was 20; he was a 46-year-old actor with a drinking problem. Under Paula's influence, Talbot quit drinking, and the couple often performed together on stage in summer stock and community theater. They had four children, became active in the Episcopal Church, lived in Studio City, California (where Talbot was honorary mayor in the 1960s), and remained married for more than 40 years, until Paula's death in 1989.

After his wife's death, Talbot moved to San Francisco, California, where both of his sons and their families lived. He died at home of congestive heart failure on March 2, 1996, at the age of 94. Talbot was remembered by SFGate as "a film and television actor who shared the screen with such legends as Bette Davis, Ginger Rogers, Humphrey Bogart, Carole Lombard, and Barbara Stanwyck." The Los Angeles Times recalled Talbot as a "versatile actor adept in every medium from tent shows to television...an actor who always worked."

He was survived by his children, three of whom—Stephen Talbot, David Talbot, and Margaret Talbot—had established careers in media production, writing, or journalism. Cynthia Talbot, Lyle's elder daughter, instead pursued a medical career, becoming a physician and later a residency director in Portland, Oregon.

== Filmography ==
=== Film ===
Year	Title	Role	Notes
1932	Unholy Love	Dr. Jerome Preston 'Jerry' Gregory	
1932	Love Is a Racket	Edw. Griswold 'Eddie' Shaw	Alternative title: Such Things Happen
1932	Stranger in Town	Brice	
1932	The Purchase Price	Eddie Fields	
1932	Miss Pinkerton	Newspaper Editor	Uncredited
1932	The Thirteenth Guest	Phil Winston	
1932	Klondike	Dr. Robert Cromwell	
1932	Big City Blues	Len 'Lenny' Sully	Uncredited
1932	Three on a Match	Michael Loftus	
1932	No More Orchids	Tony Gauge	
1932	20,000 Years in Sing Sing	Bud Saunders	
1933	Parachute Jumper	Minor Role	Scenes deleted
1933	Ladies They Talk About	Don	
1933	42nd Street	Geoffrey Warning	Uncredited voice
1933	Girl Missing	Raymond Fox	
1933	The Life of Jimmy Dolan	Doc Woods	
1933	She Had to Say Yes	Daniel Drew	
1933	A Shriek in the Night	Ted Kord	
1933	Mary Stevens, M.D.	Don Andrews	
1933	College Coach	Herbert P. 'Buck' Weaver	
1933	Havana Widows	Bob Jones	
1934	Mandalay	Dr. Gregory Burton	
1934	Heat Lightning	Jeff	
1934	Registered Nurse	Dr. Greg Connolly	
1934	Fog Over Frisco	Spencer Carlton	
1934	Return of the Terror	Dr. Leonard Goodman	
1934	The Dragon Murder Case	Dale Leland	
1934	One Night of Love	Bill Houston	
1934	A Lost Lady	Neil	
1934	Murder in the Clouds	'Three Star' Bob Halsey	
1934	The Secret Bride	Trailer Narrator	Uncredited voice
1935	Red Hot Tires	Wallace Storm	
1935	While the Patient Slept	Ross Lonergan	
1935	It Happened in New York	Charley Barnes	
1935	Our Little Girl	Rolfe Brent	
1935	Chinatown Squad	Ted Lacey	
1935	Oil for the Lamps of China	Jim	
1935	Page Miss Glory	Slattery of the Express	
1935	The Case of the Lucky Legs	Dr. Bob Doray	
1935	Broadway Hostess	Lucky	
1936	Boulder Dam	Lacy	
1936	The Singing Kid	Robert 'Bob' Carey	
1936	The Law in Her Hands	Frank 'Legs' Gordon	
1936	Murder by an Aristocrat	Dr. Allen Carick	
1936	Trapped by Television	Fred Dennis	
1936	Go West, Young Man	Francis X. Harrigan	
1936	Mind Your Own Business	Crane	
1937	Affairs of Cappy Ricks	Bill Peck	
1937	What Price Vengeance?	'Dynamite' Hogan / Tom Connors	
1937	Three Legionnaires	Pvt. Jimmy Barton	
1937	West Bound Limited	Dave Tolliver aka Bob Kirk	
1937	Second Honeymoon	Robert "Bob" Benton	
1938	Change of Heart	Phillip Reeves	
1938	Call of the Yukon	Hugo Henderson	
1938	One Wild Night	Singer Martin	
1938	Gateway	Henry Porter	
1938	The Arkansas Traveler	Matt Collins	
1938	I Stand Accused	Charles Eastman	
1939	Forged Passport	Jack Scott	
1939	They Asked for It	Marty Collins	
1939	Second Fiddle	Willie Hogger	
1939	Torture Ship	Lt. Bob Bennett	
1939	Miracle on Main Street	Dick Porter	
1940	He Married His Wife	Paul Hunter	
1940	Parole Fixer	Ross Waring	
1942	She's in the Army	Army Capt. Steve Russell	
1942	They Raid by Night	Capt. Robert Owen	
1942	Mexican Spitfire's Elephant	Reddy	
1943	Man of Courage	George Dickson	
1943	A Night for Crime	Joe Powell	
1943	The Meanest Man in the World	Bill Potts	Uncredited
1944	Up in Arms	Sgt. Gelsey	
1944	The Falcon Out West	Tex Irwin	
1944	Gambler's Choice	Yellow Gloves Weldon	
1944	Are These Our Parents?	George Kent	
1944	Sensations of 1945	Randall	
1944	Dixie Jamboree	Anthony 'Tony' Sardell	
1944	Trail to Gunsight	U. S. Marshal Bill Hollister	
1944	Mystery of the River Boat	Rudolph Toller	Serial
1944	One Body Too Many	Jim Davis	
1945	Sensation Hunters	Randsll	
1946	Gun Town	Lucky Dorgan	
1946	Murder Is My Business	Buell Renslow	
1946	Song of Arizona	King Blaine	
1946	Strange Impersonation	Inspector Malloy	
1946	Chick Carter, Detective	Chick Carter	
1947	Danger Street	Charles Johnson	
1947	The Vigilante: Fighting Hero of the West	George Pierce	
1948	Devil's Cargo	Johnny Morello	
1948	The Vicious Circle	Miller	
1948	Joe Palooka in Winner Take All	Henerson	
1948	Thunder in the Pines	Nick Roulade	
1948	Parole, Inc.	Police Commissioner Hughes	
1948	Appointment with Murder	Fred M. Muller	
1948	Quick on the Trigger	Garvey Yager	
1948	Shep Comes Home	Dr. Wilson	
1948	Highway 13	Company Detective	
1949	Joe Palooka in the Big Fight	Lt. Muldoon	
1949	Fighting Fools	Blinky Harris	
1949	The Mutineers	Capt. Jim Duncan	
1949	Sky Dragon	Andrew J. Barrett	
1949	Batman and Robin	Commissioner Jim Gordon	
1949	Mississippi Rhythm		
1949	Ringside	Radio Announcer	
1949	She Shoulda Said No!	Police Captain Hayes	
1950	The Daltons' Women	Jim Thorne	
1950	Everybody's Dancin'	Contractor	
1950	Johnny One-Eye	Official	
1950	Champagne for Caesar	Executive No. 2	
1950	Lucky Losers	Bruce McDermott	
1950	Federal Man	Agent Johnson	
1950	Atom Man vs. Superman	Lex Luthor / Atom Man	
1950	Triple Trouble	Prison Yard Guard	Uncredited
1950	Big Timber	Logger #1	
1950	Border Rangers	Ranger Capt. McLain	
1950	Cherokee Uprising	Chief Marshal	
1950	The Jackpot	Fred Burns	
1950	Revenue Agent	Augustis King	
1950	The Du Pont Story	Eugene du Pont	
1950	One Too Many	Mr. Boyer	
1951	Colorado Ambush	Sheriff Ed Lowery	
1951	Blue Blood	Teasdale	
1951	Abilene Trail	Dr. Martin	
1951	Fingerprints Don't Lie	Police Lt. Grayson	
1951	Fury of the Congo	Grant	
1951	Mask of the Dragon	Police Lt. Ralph McLaughlin	
1951	Man from Sonora	Sheriff Frank Casey	
1951	The Scarf	City Detective	Uncredited
1951	Hurricane Island	Physician	Uncredited
1951	Oklahoma Justice	Doc Willoughby	Uncredited
1951	Gold Raiders	Taggert	Alternative title: The Stooges Go West
1951	Jungle Manhunt	Dr. Mitchell Heller	
1951	Lawless Cowboys	Rank	Uncredited
1951	Purple Heart Diary	Maj. Green	
1951	Texas Lawmen	Dr. Riley	Uncredited
1951	Stage to Blue River	Perkins	
1952	The Old West	Doc Lockwood	
1952	Texas City	Captain Hamilton	
1952	With a Song in My Heart	Radio Director	Uncredited
1952	Outlaw Women	Judge Roger Dixon	
1952	Kansas Territory	Sam Collins	Uncredited
1952	African Treasure	Roy DeHaven / Pat Gilroy	
1952	Down Among the Sheltering Palms	Maj. Gerald Curwin	Uncredited
1952	Sea Tiger	Mr. Williams	
1952	Montana Incident	Mooney	
1952	Untamed Women	Col. Loring	
1952	Feudin' Fools	Big Jim	
1952	Desperadoes' Outpost	Walter Fleming	
1952	Son of Geronimo: Apache Avenger	Col. Foster	Serial
1952	Wyoming Roundup	Franklin	
1952	The Pathfinder	British Ship Captain	
1953	Star of Texas	Telegraph Operator	
1953	White Lightning	Rocky Gibraltar	
1953	Trail Blazers	Deputy Sheriff McLain	
1953	Glen or Glenda	Insp. Warren	
1953	Mesa of Lost Women	Narrator	Voice
1953	Clipped Wings	Capt. Blair	
1953	Wings of the Hawk	Jones	Uncredited
1953	The Great Adventures of Captain Kidd	Boston Official	Serial, uncredited
1953	Tumbleweed	Weber	
1953	Commando Cody: Sky Marshal of the Universe	Baylor	Serial
1954	Trader Tom of the China Seas	Barent	
1954	Gunfighters of the Northwest	Inspector Wheeler	
1954	Jail Bait	Inspector Johns	
1954	The Mad Magician	Program Hawker	Uncredited
1954	Captain Kidd and the Slave Girl	Capt. Pace	
1954	The Desperado	Judge	Uncredited
1954	Tobor the Great	Admiral	Uncredited
1954	Two Guns and a Badge	Doctor	Uncredited
1954	There's No Business Like Show Business	Stage Manager	Uncredited
1954	The Steel Cage	Square	
1955	Jail Busters	Cy Bowman	
1955	Sudden Danger	Harry Woodruff	
1956	Calling Homicide	Tony Fuller	
1956	The Great Man	Harry Connors	
1957	God Is My Partner	Dr. Warburton	
1958	The Notorious Mr. Monks	Leonardo	
1958	High School Confidential	William Remington Kane	
1958	The Hot Angel	Van Richards	
1959	City of Fear	Chief Jensen	
1959	Plan 9 from Outer Space	General Roberts	
1960	Sunrise at Campobello	Mr. Brimmer	
1987	Amazon Women on the Moon	Prescott Townsend	Uncredited

=== Television ===
Year	Title	Role	Notes
1950	The Life of Riley	Phillips	Episode: "The Banned Book", uncredited
1950	The Ruggles		Episode: "1.24"
1950	Dick Tracy	B.R. Ayne/The Brain / 88 Kyes / Big Frost	7 episodes
1950–1954	The Cisco Kid	Various roles	4 episodes
1950–1956	The Lone Ranger	Various roles	5 episodes
1951	Hollywood Theatre Time	Mr. Quigley	2 episodes
1951	The Buster Keaton Show	Supplier	Episode: "The Little Theatre Story"
1951	Racket Squad		Episode: "Big Secret"
1951	Red Ryder	Martin	Episode: "Whiplash"
1951	Front Page Detective	Various roles	4 episodes
1951–1956	The Adventures of Wild Bill Hickok	W.T. Emerson / Teller / Blackburn	4 episodes
1952	Space Patrol	Cadwalader	Episode: "The Code Breakers"
1952	The Files of Jeffrey Jones	Bob York	Episode: "Pigeon Hunt"
1952	Terry and the Pirates	Clyde Thompson	Episode: "The Maitland Affair"
1952	Gangbusters	Dr. Guelife / R.X. Hicks	2 episodes
1952	Dangerous Assignment	Various roles	9 episodes
1952	Crown Theatre		Episode: "Mr. Influence"
1952–1953	Cowboy G-Men	Oliver Bartlett / John Vance / Hudson	3 episodes
1952–1954	Death Valley Days	Mayor / Dr. Harper / Silas Capshaw	4 episodes
1953	I'm the Law	Agent Johnson	Episode: "The Powder Box Smuggling Story"
1953	Chevron Theatre	Various roles	2 episodes
1953	The Roy Rogers Show	John Zachary	Episode: "Loaded Guns"
1953	Mr. and Mrs. North	Dave Gerard	Episode: "Breakout"
1953	Boston Blackie	Wildcat Cannon	Episode: "Pursuit"
1953	Your Favorite Story	Various roles	2 episodes
1953	The Gene Autry Show	Various roles	4 episodes
1953	Topper	Mr. Moulton	Episode: "Topper Meets the Ghosts"
1953	Hopalong Cassidy	Stephen Roberts	Episode: "The Valley Riders"
1953	Your Jeweler's Showcase	Lt. Rogers	Episode: "Cell 14"
1953	My Little Margie	John Branton	Episode: "Comedy of Terrors"
1954–1958	December Bride	Bill Monahan / Mr. Winters / Mr. Butterfield	6 episodes
1955	Hallmark Hall of Fame		TV series, 1 episode
1955–1959	The Bob Cummings Show	Paul Fonda	TV series, 22 episodes
1956	Navy Log	Captain Morgan	TV series, 1 episode
1956	The Millionaire	Joe Price	TV series, 1 episode
1956–1966	The Adventures of Ozzie and Harriet	Joe Randolph	TV series, 71 episodes
1957	Science Fiction Theatre	General Dothan	TV series, 1 episode
1957	Tales of Wells Fargo	Reporter	TV series, 1 episode
1958	M Squad	Paul Crowley	TV series, 1 episode
1958	Leave It to Beaver	Charles "Chuck" Dennison	TV series, 2 episodes
1958–1959	The Restless Gun	Various roles	TV series, 2 episodes
1959	Maverick	TV Series - episode Two Tickets to Ten Strike	Martin Scott
1959	The Ann Sothern Show	Finletter	TV, 1 episode
1960	Surfside 6	Alan Crandell	TV series, 1 episode
1960	Hawaiian Eye	George Wallace	TV series, 1 episode
1960	The DuPont Show with June Allyson	Mr. Anders	CBS-TV, 1 episode, "The Trench Coat"
1960	Richard Diamond, Private Detective	Victor Long	Episode: "The Lovely Fraud"
1961	Mister Ed	George Hausner	TV series, 1 episode
1961	Lawman	Orville Luster	TV series, 1 episode
1962	Make Room for Daddy	Dr. Crawford	TV series, 1 episode
1962	Dennis the Menace	Mayor	TV series, 1 episode
1962–1967	The Beverly Hillbillies	Colonel Blake	TV series, 4 episodes
1963	Arrest and Trial	Phil Paige	TV series, 1 episode
1963	The Lucy Show	Howard Wilcox / Mr. Stanford	TV series, 2 episodes
1964	77 Sunset Strip	Tatum	TV series, 1 episode
1964	Petticoat Junction	Mr. Cheever	TV series, 1 episode
1965	Run for Your Life	Steven Blakely	TV series, 1 episode
1965	The Smothers Brothers Show	Marty Miller	TV series, 1 episode
1965–1966	Laredo	Various roles	TV series, 2 episodes
1968	Dragnet	William Joseph Cornelius	TV series, 1 episode
1969	Green Acres	Senator Lyle Talbot	TV series, 1 episode
1970	Here's Lucy	Freddy Fox / Harry's Lawyer	TV series, 2 episodes
1972	O'Hara, U.S. Treasury	Art Prescott	TV series, 1 episode
1973	Adam-12	Avery Dawson	TV series, 1 episode
1979	Charlie's Angels	Mills	TV series, 1 episode
1984	The Dukes of Hazzard	Carter Stewart	TV series, 1 episode
1984	St. Elsewhere	Johnny Barnes	TV series, 1 episode
1981	An Ozzie and Harriet Christmas	Self	TV special on KTLA in Los Angeles
1985	227	Harold	TV series, 1 episode
1986	Alfred Hitchcock Presents	Mr. Fletcher	TV series, 1 episode
1986	Who's the Boss?	Ralph	TV series, 1 episode
1987	Newhart	Cousin Ned	TV series, 1 episode, "It's My Party and I'll Die If I Want To"
