= Texas City (film) =

1952 film by Lewis D. Collins

- Directed by: Lewis D. Collins
- Written by: Joseph F. Poland
- Produced by: Vincent M. Fennelly
- Starring: Johnny Mack Brown; James Ellison; Lois Hall
- Cinematography: Ernest Miller
- Edited by: Sam Fields
- Music by: Raoul Kraushaar
- Production company: Silvermine Productions
- Distributed by: Monogram Pictures
- Release date: January 27, 1952
- Running time: 54 minutes
- Country: United States
- Language: English

Texas City is a 1952 American Western film directed by Lewis D. Collins and starring Johnny Mack Brown, James Ellison and Lois Hall. It distributed as a second feature by Monogram Pictures. The film's sets were designed by the art director Martin Obzina.

== Cast ==
- Johnny Mack Brown as Johnny Mack Brown
- James Ellison as Jim Kirby
- Lois Hall as Lois Upton
- Terry Frost as henchman Trag
- Lane Bradford as Hank
- Lyle Talbot as Captain Hamilton
- Marshall Reed as henchman Yarnell
- Pierce Lyden as Marshal George Markham
- Bud Osborne as henchman, stage driver
- Bill Coontz as soldier
- John Hart as 1st Sergeant
- Stanley Price as 2nd Sergeant
- Lorna Thayer as Aunt Harriet Upton
