= Texas Bad Man =

1953 film by Lewis D. Collins

- Theatrical film poster
- Directed by: Lewis D. Collins
- Written by: Joseph F. Poland
- Produced by: Vincent M. Fennelly
- Starring: Wayne Morris; Elaine Riley; Frank Ferguson
- Cinematography: Gilbert Warrenton
- Edited by: Sam Fields
- Music by: Raoul Kraushaar
- Production company: Allied Artists Pictures
- Distributed by: Allied Artists Pictures
- Release date: December 20, 1953
- Running time: 62 minutes
- Country: United States
- Language: English

Texas Bad Man is a 1953 American Western film directed by Lewis D. Collins and starring Wayne Morris, Frank Ferguson and Elaine Riley.

== Cast ==
- Wayne Morris as Walt
- Frank Ferguson as Gil
- Elaine Riley as Lois
- Sheb Wooley as Mack
- Denver Pyle as Tench
- Myron Healey as Jackson
- Mort Mills as bartender
- Nelson Leigh as Bradley
