= Montana Incident =

1952 film by Lewis D. Collins

- Directed by: Lewis D. Collins
- Written by: Daniel B. Ullman
- Produced by: Vincent M. Fennelly
- Starring: Whip Wilson; Rand Brooks; Noel Neill
- Cinematography: Ernest Miller
- Edited by: Sam Fields
- Music by: Raoul Kraushaar
- Production company: Silvermine Productions
- Distributed by: Monogram Pictures
- Release date: August 10, 1952
- Running time: 54 minutes
- Country: United States
- Language: English

Montana Incident is a 1952 American Western film directed by Lewis D. Collins and starring Whip Wilson, Rand Brooks and Noel Neill.

The film's sets were designed by the art director Dave Milton.

== Plot ==
Whip and Dave are surveying the planned Central Railroad route passing through Martinville. The residents who have been exploited by the Martin family are enthusiastic, but Clara Martin and her father are against it and will stop it by all means at their disposal.

== Cast ==
- Whip Wilson as Whip Wilson
- Rand Brooks as Dave Connors
- Noel Neill as Frances Martin
- Bruce Edwards as Arnold Benson
- Peggy Stewart as Clara Martin
- William Fawcett as Albert Hawkins
- Terry Frost as Henchman Macklin
- Marshall Reed as Henchman Crawford
- Lyle Talbot as Mooney
