= The Man from Hell =

1934 film

- Lobby card
- Directed by: Lewis D. Collins
- Written by: Ed Earl Repp; Melville Shyer
- Produced by: Willis Kent
- Starring: Reb Russell; Fred Kohler; George 'Gabby' Hayes
- Cinematography: William Nobles
- Edited by: S. Roy Luby
- Production company: Willis Kent Productions
- Release date: August 29, 1934
- Running time: 55 minutes
- Country: United States
- Language: English

The Man from Hell is a 1934 American Western film directed by Lewis D. Collins and starring Reb Russell, Fred Kohler and George 'Gabby' Hayes.

== Cast ==
- Reb Russell as Clint Mason
- Fred Kohler as Mayor Anse McCloud
- Ann Darcy as Nancy Campbell
- George 'Gabby' Hayes as Colonel Campbell
- Jack Rockwell as Marshal Lon Kelly
- Charles K. French as Sandy - Blacksmith
- Murdock MacQuarrie as Sheriff Jake Klein
- Slim Whitaker as Tom - mine owner
- Tommy Bupp as Timmy McCarrol
- Yakima Canutt as Yak - henchman
