= Bill Kennedy (actor) =

American actor (1908–1997)

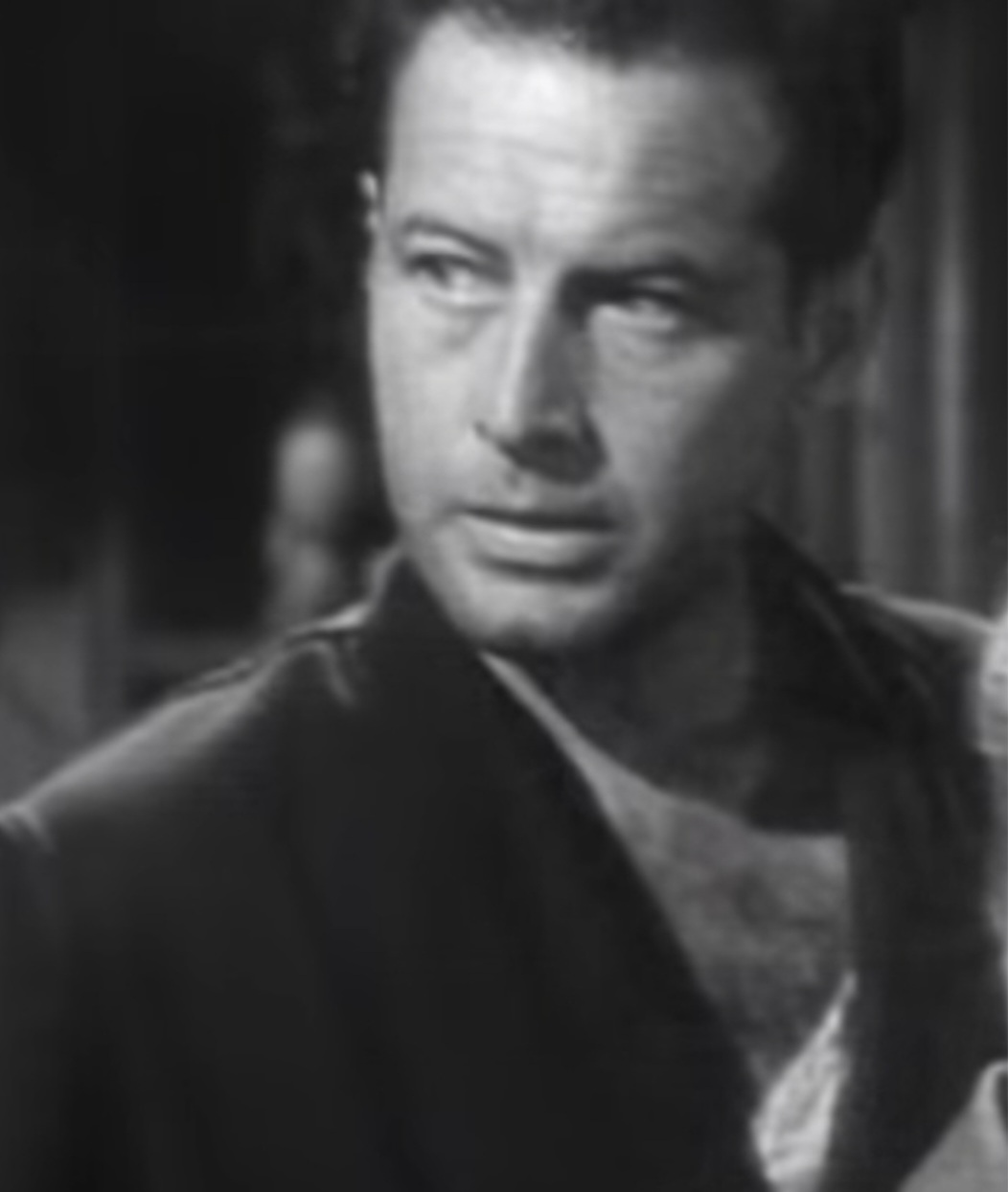
- Kennedy in That Brennan Girl (1947)
- Born: Willard Kennedy; June 27, 1908; Cleveland, Ohio, U.S.
- Died: January 27, 1997 (aged 88); Palm Beach, Florida, U.S.
- Occupation: Actor
- Years active: 1941–1984
- Spouse: Suzanne Kennedy (m. 1971)
- Children: 3

Willard "Bill" Kennedy (June 27, 1908 – January 27, 1997) was an American actor, voice artist, and host of the long-running Detroit-based television show, Bill Kennedy at the Movies. He began his career as a staff announcer in radio; Kennedy's voice narrates the opening of the television series Adventures of Superman.

== Career ==
Kennedy was born June 27, 1908, in Cleveland, Ohio. He began his media career as a staff announcer at WWJ, The Detroit News.

In 1941, he became a Warner Bros. contract player, appearing in dozens of Hollywood movies from 1941 through 1955. He was often cast as a police officer or detective. He played Thierache, the Executioner, who sets fire to Joan (played by Ingrid Bergman) in Joan of Arc (1948), but recounted that after the picture previewed in a neighborhood popular with gays, his one line – "We need more fagots" (a term referring to a bundle of sticks used to burn someone at the stake) – generated loud laughter from the audience during the execution scene. He also played opposite Cary Grant in Destination Tokyo.

For the Superman TV series, he was the announcer during its several year run. He appeared off-screen (uncredited) as the wrestling announcer in the 1952 episode, "No Holds Barred;" and on-screen, as one of the radio announcers (uncredited) in the 1953 episode, "Crime Wave"; and as the racetrack announcer in the 1955 episode "Joey". He is believed to have provided the voice on the phone for the 1954 episode, "Beware the Wrecker". Denver Pyle played the part on-screen and had a couple of spoken lines. Kennedy also appeared as a guest star in numerous series, such as The Lone Ranger, The Cisco Kid, The Gene Autry Show, and Death Valley Days.

In 1956 Kennedy returned from California to the Detroit area as host of Bill Kennedy's Showtime at CKLW-TV, based directly across the Detroit River in Windsor, Ontario. The musical standard, "Just in Time" was his theme song. In 1969 he moved to WKBD and continued hosting the show. Initially using the same name as at CKLW-TV, Bill Kennedy's Showtime, the WKBD program would be renamed Bill Kennedy at the Movies by the start of 1972. Kennedy would host films for WKBD until retiring to Florida in 1983.

On his afternoon TV program, he showed old movies and provided anecdotes about the actors and the production of the movies. These came in large part from his own Hollywood experience. He had a deadpan, sardonic style which many found refreshing, somewhat similar to that of Ed Sullivan. He expressed his opinion of the movies, making comments such as "We have a moderately good picture for you today". He introduced the featured film, Dragonwyck (1946), by saying, "Today we have one of the most boring movies ever made." He took on-air calls from viewers, which was a highlight of his daily shows. When Kennedy showed a film in which he had a part, he would talk at every break about the role, but always with a wink and good humor. Kennedy would also interview stars of some of the movies that he would host when those stars would be visiting the Detroit area and include it with that day's film broadcast.

He died January 27, 1997, in Palm Beach, Florida, of emphysema.

== Selected filmography ==
- Highway West (1941) – Cop in Car-Crash (uncredited)
- Flying Fortress (1942) – Manhattan News Radio Announcer (uncredited)
- Secret Enemies (1942) – Radio Broadcaster (voice, uncredited)
- Busses Roar (1942) – The Moocher
- You Can't Escape Forever (1942) – Reporter at Execution (uncredited)
- Now, Voyager (1942) – Hamilton Hunneker (uncredited)
- The Hard Way (1943) – Radio Announcer (uncredited)
- Truck Busters (1943) – Tim Shaughnessy
- Air Force (1943) – Marine (uncredited)
- Mission to Moscow (1943) – American Newsman (uncredited)
- This Is the Army (1943) – News Commentator (uncredited)
- Murder on the Waterfront (1943) – First Officer Barnes
- Princess O'Rourke (1943) – Second Airline Dispatcher (uncredited)
- Northern Pursuit (1943) – Mountie (uncredited)
- Destination Tokyo (1943) – Torpedo Gunnery Officer
- The Adventures of Mark Twain (1944) – Townsman (uncredited)
- Mr. Skeffington (1944) – Bill Thatcher
- Make Your Own Bed (1944) – FBI Agent (uncredited)
- The Doughgirls (1944) – Tall Guy who Punches Drake (uncredited)
- Crime by Night (1944) – Hospital Attendant (uncredited)
- The Last Ride (1944) – Correlli (uncredited)
- Hollywood Canteen (1944) – Busboy (uncredited)
- Escape in the Desert (1945) – Hank Albright
- Rhapsody in Blue (1945) – Herbert Stone
- The Royal Mounted Rides Again (1945, Serial) – Corporal J. Wayne Decker
- The People's Choice (1946) – Abner Snell
- Don't Gamble with Strangers (1946) – Harry Amold
- Of Human Bondage (1946) – Flanagan
- The Bachelor's Daughters (1946) – Mr. Stapp
- That Brennan Girl (1946) – Arthur, Helen's Husband
- Seven Were Saved (1947) – Colonel (uncredited)
- Fun on a Weekend (1947) – Bill Davis (uncredited)
- Web of Danger (1947) – Ernie Reardon
- News Hounds (1947) – Mark Morgan
- Louisiana (1947)
- The Gangster (1947) – Thug (uncredited)
- Overland Trails (1948) – Carter Morgan
- Assigned to Danger (1948) – Assistant District Attorney (uncredited)
- Raw Deal (1948) – Drunk (uncredited)
- I Wouldn't Be in Your Shoes (1948) – 2nd Detective
- Triggerman (1948) – Kirby
- A Southern Yankee (1948) – Lt. Sheve (uncredited)
- In This Corner (1948) – Al Barton
- The Sheriff of Medicine Bow (1948) – Barry Stuart
- Joan of Arc (1948) – Thierache (Joan's executioner)
- Belle Starr's Daughter (1948) – Kiowa Marshal (uncredited)
- Dynamite (1949) – Construction Worker (uncredited)
- Shadows of the West (1949) – Banker Ward
- Law of the West (1949) – Dan Nixon – Land Agent
- Forgotten Women (1949) – Bill Dunning
- Trail of the Yukon (1949) – Constable
- Malaya (1949) – Intern (uncredited)
- Chain Lightning (1950) – Radio Man at Test Flight (uncredited)
- The Gunfighter (1950) – Ace Larabee
- Storm Over Wyoming (1950) – Jess Rawlins
- Peggy (1950) – Reporter (uncredited)
- I Shot Billy the Kid (1950) – Deputy John Poe
- Train to Tombstone (1950) – Rev. Jared Greeley (uncredited)
- Border Rangers (1950) – Sgt. Carlson
- Gunslingers (1950) - Ace Larabee
- Two Lost Worlds (1951) – Martin Shannon
- Abilene Trail (1951) – Rancher Colter
- Cry Danger (1951) – Cop at Trailer Park (uncredited)
- Silver City Bonanza (1951) – Monk Monroe
- Canyon Raiders (1951) – Hemingway (uncredited)
- Nevada Badmen (1951) – Jensen – Banker
- Red Planet Mars (1952) – News Commentator #1 (uncredited)
- Born to the Saddle (1953) – Jeff (uncredited)
- Unchained (1955) – Sanders (uncredited)
- Lucy Gallant (1955) – Newspaper Reporter at Fashion Show (uncredited)
- I Died a Thousand Times (1955) – Sheriff
- Male and Female Since Adam and Eve (1961) – Adam
- Don't Make Waves (1967) – Reporter (uncredited) (final film role)
