= Border Rangers =

1950 film by William A. Berke

- Theatrical release poster
- Directed by: William Berke
- Screenplay by: Victor West; William Berke
- Produced by: William Berke
- Starring: Don Barry; Robert Lowery; Wally Vernon; Pamela Blake
- Cinematography: Ernest W. Miller
- Edited by: Carl Pierson
- Music by: Albert Glasser
- Production company: Lippert Pictures
- Release date: October 6, 1950 (United States)
- Running time: 58 minutes
- Country: United States
- Language: English

Border Rangers is a 1950 American Western film directed by William Berke and starring Don Barry, Robert Lowery, Wally Vernon and Pamela Blake.

== Cast ==
- Don Barry as Bob Standish / The Rio Kid
- Robert Lowery as Mungo
- Wally Vernon as Hungry Hicks
- Pamela Blake as Ellen Reed
- Lyle Talbot as Capt. McLain
- Claude Stroud as Horace Randolph
- Ezelle Poule as Aunt Priscilla Weeks
- Bill Kennedy as Sgt. Carlson
- Paul Jordan as Tommy Standish
- Alyn Lockwood as Mrs. Standish
- John Merton as Gans
- Tom Monroe as Hackett
- George Keymas as Raker
- Tom Kennedy as Station Agent
- Eric Norden as George Standish
