= Whistling Hills =

1951 film by Derwin Abrahams

- Original film poster
- Directed by: Derwin Abrahams
- Written by: Jack Lewis (story); Fred Myton; Lew Hodgson
- Produced by: Vincent M. Fennelly
- Starring: Johnny Mack Brown; James Ellison; Noel Neill
- Cinematography: Ernest Miller
- Edited by: Sam Fields
- Music by: Raoul Kraushaar
- Production company: Frontier Pictures
- Distributed by: Monogram Pictures
- Release date: October 7, 1951
- Running time: 58 minutes
- Country: United States
- Language: English

Whistling Hills is a 1951 American Western film directed by Derwin Abrahams and starring Johnny Mack Brown, James Ellison and Noel Neill.

The film was shot at the Iverson Movie Ranch and its sets were designed by art director Dave Milton.

== Plot ==
Johnny Mack Brown rides into town to discover that his horse has been stolen. When the thief identifies himself in a saloon and tries to sell Johnny's horse back to him, Johnny knocks him down. Chet Norman wishes to use Johnny's skills to stop a series of holdups of his stagecoaches that are bankrupting him. Each of the robberies takes place in the Whistling Hills, with the survivors swearing that they heard a whistling signal.

== Cast ==
- Johnny Mack Brown as Johnny Mack Brown
- James Ellison as Sheriff Dave Holland
- Noel Neill as Beth Fairchild
- I. Stanford Jolley as Chet Norman
- Marshall Reed as Roger Claine
- Pamela Duncan as Waitress Cora
- Lee Roberts as Henchman Slade
- Pierce Lyden as Cassidy
- Bud Osborne as Pete

== Bibliography ==
- Bernard A. Drew. Motion Picture Series and Sequels: A Reference Guide. Routledge, 2013.
