= The Gunman (1952 film) =

1952 film by Lewis D. Collins

- Directed by: Lewis D. Collins
- Written by: Fred Myton
- Produced by: Vincent M. Fennelly
- Starring: Whip Wilson; Fuzzy Knight; Rand Brooks
- Cinematography: Ernest Miller
- Edited by: Sam Fields
- Music by: Raoul Kraushaar
- Production company: Silvermine Productions
- Distributed by: Monogram Pictures
- Release date: April 13, 1952
- Running time: 52 minutes
- Country: United States
- Language: English

The Gunman is a 1952 American Western film directed by Lewis D. Collins and starring Whip Wilson, Fuzzy Knight and Rand Brooks.

== Plot ==
Marshal Whip Wilson and his sidekick Jud enter New Mexico to pursue a wanted outlaw. They discover a town ruled by outlaws in which the sheriff refuses to help.

== Cast ==
- Whip Wilson as Whip Wilson
- Fuzzy Knight as Blinkey
- Rand Brooks as Jud Calvert
- Phyllis Coates as Anita Forester
- Terry Frost as Duke Kirby
- I. Stanford Jolley as Dan Forester
- Russ Whiteman as Sheriff Hanley
- Robert Bray as Tom Jamison
- Lane Bradford as Jack Gatlin
- Gregg Barton as Bill Longley
- Richard Avonde as Curt Blake
