= Everybody's Dancin' (film) =

1950 film

- Directed by: Will Jason
- Written by: Dorothy Raison
- Based on: story by Nunes and Spade Cooley
- Produced by: Bob Nunes associate Spade Cooley executive Robert L. Lippert
- Music by: Albert Glasser
- Production company: Nunes-Cooley Productions
- Distributed by: Lippert Pictures (US); Exclusive Films (UK)
- Release date: March 31, 1950
- Running time: 65 minutes
- Country: United States
- Language: English

Everybody's Dancin' is a 1950 American musical film. The film's working title was Western Varieties and it was shot at Nassour Studios, produced by star Spade Cooley's company and released by Robert L. Lippert. Cooley had recently appeared in Square Dance Jubilee for Lippert.

== Cast ==
- Spade Cooley as John Martin/Spade Cooley, previously known as Donald Martin
- Dick Lane as "Colonel" Ed Harrison
- Barbara Woodell as "Mama" Mary Berne
- Ginny Jackson as Ginny Johnson
- Hal Derwin as Bill
- James Millican as "Papa" Steve Berne
- Lyle Talbot as Contractor
- Michael Whalen as Mr. Landon
- Sid Melton as Agent
- Tex Cromer as Tex Cromer
