= Tommy Farrell =

American actor (1921–2004)

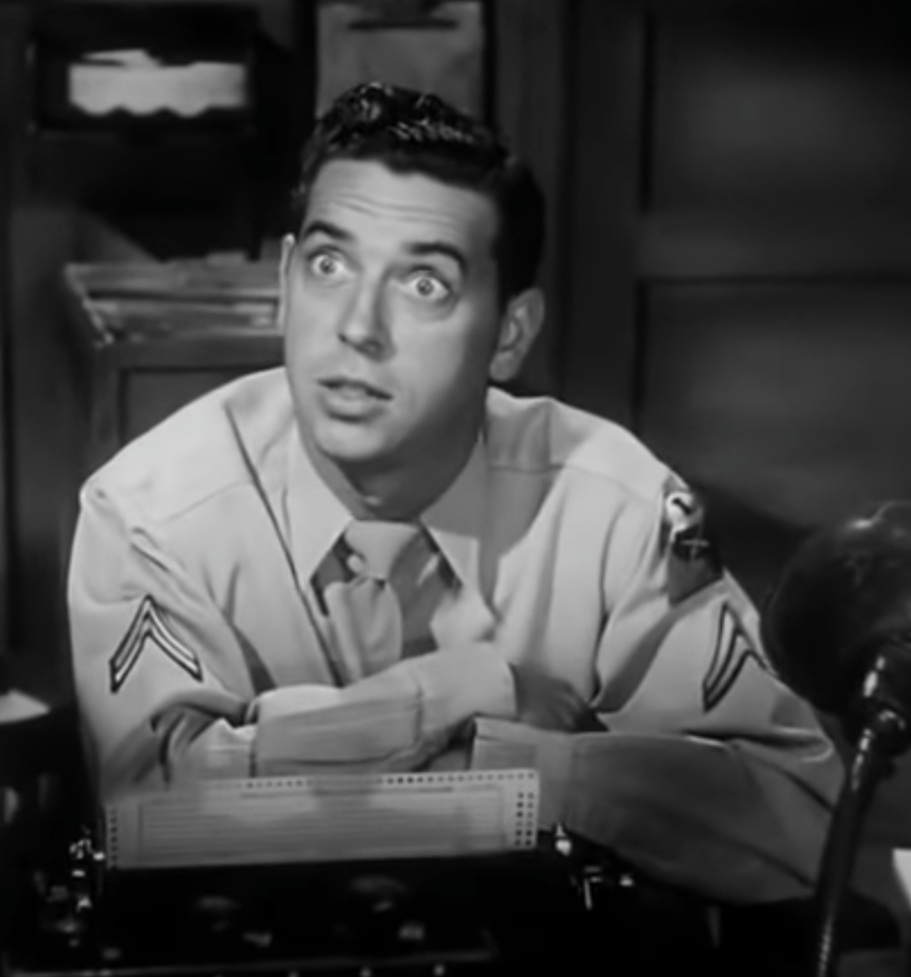
- Farrell in At War with the Army (1950)
- Born: Thomas Farrell Richards; October 7, 1921; Hollywood, California, U.S.
- Died: May 9, 2004 (aged 82); Woodland Hills, Los Angeles; California, U.S.
- Other names: Tommie Farrell; Tom Farrell
- Occupation: Actor
- Years active: 1944–1983
- Spouse(s): Norma Farrell (m. 19??; div. 19??) Ann Kass (m. 1947; div. 1959) Bobbi Ely (m. 1961)
- Children: 4
- Parents: Thomas Richards (father); Glenda Farrell (mother)
- Awards: Golden Boot Awards 2003

Tommy Farrell (born Thomas Farrell Richards; October 7, 1921 – May 9, 2004) was an American actor who appeared in over 100 films and TV series between 1944 and 1983. He was best known for his sidekick roles in the Hollywood Golden Age.

== Career ==
Farrell made his Broadway debut as a young drummer in Strip for Action and made his movie debut in Winged Victory, the film version of the Army Air Forces play of the same title. He was a corporal at the time.

During the 1940s, he became entrenched as a supporting player in B Westerns and cliffhanger serials. He also appeared in a number of other films, including Kissin' Cousins costarring with his mother, Glenda Farrell, and Elvis Presley, and A Guide for the Married Man with Walter Matthau. After the Westerns and serials, he migrated to television work.

On television, Farrell played Corporal Thad Carson on The Adventures of Rin Tin Tin, Riff Ryan on The Many Loves of Dobie Gillis, and Chet Holliday, father of Alice Holliday, in the 1958–59 syndicated sitcom This is Alice. He was also a recurring guest star in two other sitcoms, Room for One More and Here's Lucy. He made six appearances on Perry Mason in minor roles such as salesman or reporter. He finally retired in 1979 after filming an episode of the Robert Urich series, Vega$.

== Personal life ==
Farrell was married three times. He had a daughter, born in 1945, with his first wife, Norma, another daughter, born in 1951, with his second wife, Ann, and two more children, a son and a daughter, with his third wife, Bobbi.

== Recognition ==
In 2003, Farrell was honored during the 21st Annual Golden Boot Awards ceremony for his work in the Western genre, along with Sue Ane Langdon, Michael Dante, Graham Greene, Kris Kristofferson, and Tommy Lee Jones, among others.

== Death ==
Farrell died of natural causes at the Motion Picture and Television Fund hospital in Woodland Hills, Los Angeles, California, at the age of 82. At the time of his death, he was the last living B Western sidekick from the golden era of Westerns.

He was survived by his wife, a son, three daughters, and three grandchildren.

== Filmography ==
=== Films ===
- Winged Victory (1944) – Soldier in Audience at Camp Show (uncredited)
- Duchess of Idaho (1950) – Chuck
- Atom Man vs. Superman (1950, Serial) – Man Observing Ship Rescue / Briggs, Chs. 2, 10 (uncredited)
- Gunfire (1950) – Lerner—Silver Wagon Driver
- Last of the Buccaneers (1950) – René – Pirate (uncredited)
- Pirates of the High Seas (1950, Serial) – Kelly Walsh
- Pygmy Island (1950) – Captain (uncredited)
- Outlaws of Texas (1950) – Jeff Johnson
- At War with the Army (1950) – Cpl. Clark
- Colorado Ambush (1951) – Terry Williams
- Abilene Trail (1951) – Ed Dawson
- A Yank in Korea (1951) – Jinx Hamilton
- Roar of the Iron Horse (1951, Serial) – Del – Young Outlaw in Polka-Dot Shirt [Chs. 6, 7, 9–11, 15] (uncredited)
- Strangers on a Train (1951) – 1# Miriam's Boyfriend (uncredited)
- The Strip (1951) – Boynton
- The Stooge (1951) – Tommy – Kit Kat Club MC (uncredited)
- Starlift (1951) – Turner – Card Player (uncredited)
- Captain Video: Master of the Stratosphere (1951, Serial) – Atoma Head Soldier [Ch. 2] (uncredited)
- The Marrying Kind (1952) – Cliff (uncredited)
- Night Raiders (1952) – Jim Dugan
- Meet Danny Wilson (1952) - Tommy Wells
- This Woman Is Dangerous (1952) – Bellhop (uncredited)
- Flesh and Fury (1952) – Rocky (uncredited)
- Singin' in the Rain (1952) – Sid Phillips (uncredited)
- The Atomic City (1952) – Baseball Game Usher (uncredited)
- Brave Warrior (1952) – Townsman (uncredited)
- You for Me (1952) – Dr. Rollie Cobb
- The Golden Hawk (1952) – Spanish Captain (uncredited)
- Son of Geronimo: Apache Avenger (1952, Serial) – Frank Baker
- Wyoming Roundup (1952) – Bob Burke
- Girls in the Night (1953) – Frankie
- The 49th Man (1953) – Agent Reynolds
- Siren of Bagdad (1953) – Palace Guard (uncredited)
- Sky Commando (1953) – Pilot (uncredited)
- The Great Adventures of Captain Kidd (1953) – Kidd crewman (uncredited)
- Gunfighters of the Northwest (1954, Serial) – Constable Arch Perry – Ch's 1–2
- Woman Obsessed (1959) – Carnival Barker (uncredited)
- North by Northwest (1959) – Eddie, Elevator Operator (uncredited)
- Wake Me When It's Over (1960) – Smitty (uncredited)
- Bells Are Ringing (1960) – Party Guest (uncredited)
- Swingin' Along (1961) – Georgie
- Breakfast at Tiffany's (1961) – Party Guest (uncredited)
- Saintly Sinners (1962) – Mike (uncredited)
- My Six Loves (1963) – Studio Representative (uncredited)
- Kissin' Cousins (1964) – Master Sgt. William George Bailey
- The Disorderly Orderly (1964) – Policeman (uncredited)
- Never Too Late (1965) – Fred Ainsley (uncredited)
- Boy, Did I Get a Wrong Number! (1966) – Reporter (uncredited)
- A Guide for the Married Man (1967) – Rance G.'s Hanger On

=== TV shows ===
- The Adventures of Rin Tin Tin (1955–59) – Cpl. Thad Carson
- Matinee Theatre (1957) – George Hill
- Maverick (1957) – Lefty Dolan
- Bachelor Father (1957–1961) – Toaster Salesman / Joe Browning / Cecil
- Cheyenne (1958)
- This is Alice (1958) – Chet Holliday
- Dragnet (1958)
- Gunsmoke (1958) – Pfc. Atwood
- Wanted: Dead or Alive (1959) – Billy Bland
- Bourbon Street Beat (1959–1960) – Jay O'Hanlon
- The Many Loves of Dobie Gillis (1959–1961) – Riff Ryan
- Richard Diamond, Private Detective (1960) – Frank Connolly
- Hawaiian Eye (1960–1962) – Freddie / Breezy Gallagher / Cy Bliss
- Pete and Gladys (1961) – Steve
- Bringing Up Buddy (1961) – Billy
- The Roaring 20's (1961) – Hermie Marcus / Al
- Perry Mason (1962–1965) – Reporter / TV Reporter / Jefferson / Herbert Baker / Robert Fordney / Salesman
- Rawhide (1963) – Mister Buzby
- Dr. Kildare (1963) – Wally
- The Fugitive (1964) – Ryan
- The Munsters (1964) – The Assistant
- The Addams Family (1965) – Sam Diamond
- The Lucy Show (1965–1966) – Harry / Pete Murdock
- The Man from U.N.C.L.E. (1966) – Coplin
- F Troop (1966) – Jenks
- The Beverly Hillbillies (1966) – Pilot
- Gomer Pyle, U.S.M.C. (1966–1968) – Assistant Cameraman / Reporter
- Lost in Space (1967) – Cyborg
- Here's Lucy (1968–1974) – Phil Harris' Manager / Bank Teller / Paul / Reporter / Sky Marshal / Morgan
- Get Smart (1970) – Tuttle
- Vega$ (1979) – Harmon Cox
- Hart to Hart (1983) – Roaring Tommy (final appearance)

== See also ==
- 2003, The 21st Annual Golden Boot Awards
