= Hot Rod (1950 film) =

1950 film by Lewis D. Collins

- DVD cover
- Directed by: Lewis D. Collins
- Written by: Daniel B. Ullman
- Produced by: Jerry Thomas
- Starring: Jimmy Lydon; Art Baker; Gil Stratton
- Cinematography: Gilbert Warrenton
- Edited by: Roy V. Livingston
- Music by: Edward J. Kay
- Production company: Monogram Pictures
- Distributed by: Monogram Pictures
- Release dates: October 12, 1950; December 5, 1950 (New York)
- Running time: 61 minutes
- Country: United States
- Language: English

Hot Rod is a 1950 American drama film directed by Lewis D. Collins and starring Jimmy Lydon, Art Baker, Myron Healey, Gloria Winters and Gil Stratton.

== Cast ==
- Jimmy Lydon as David Langham
- Art Baker as Judge Langham
- Gil Stratton as Clarence "Swifty" Johnson
- Gloria Winters as Janie Evans
- Myron Healey as Joe Langham
- Tommy Bond as Jack Blodgett
- Jean Dean as Gloria
- Bret Hamilton as Paul
- Marshall Reed as John C. Roberts
- Dennis Moore as motorcycle patrolman
- Sailor Vincent as holdup man

== Production ==
Jimmy Lydon was announced as the film's star just before production began in late July 1950. The production wrapped within one week.

== Reception ==
Critic Dorothy Masters of the New York Daily News wrote: "The plot for 'Hot Rod' is considerably more transparent than the celluloid it's printed on. In undertaking an indictment of souped-up cars in irresponsible hands on public highways, the picture telegraphs its melodramatics in the first reel. ... James Lydon tried hard and does as well as can be expected of such a poorly written role."
