= Souls in Pawn (1940 film) =

1940 film

- Film poster
- Directed by: Melville Shyer
- Written by: Margaret Blake Robinson
- Produced by: Willis Kent
- Starring: Kenne Duncan; Lloyd Ingraham; Symona Boniface
- Cinematography: Harvey Gould
- Edited by: George Halligan
- Production company: Willis Kent Productions
- Distributed by: Willis Kent Productions
- Release date: December 1940
- Running time: 62 minutes
- Country: United States
- Language: English

Souls in Pawn is a 1940 American drama film directed by Melville Shyer and featuring Kenne Duncan, Lloyd Ingraham, Symona Boniface. It was produced by the independent producer Willis Kent.

== Plot ==
A young woman is secretly married to a college student and falls pregnant. However he refuses to support the child and so after giving birth she agrees to give it up for adoption. It is then adopted by a burlesque queen as part of a publicity stunt.

== Cast ==
- Ginger Britton as Nan Carey
- Beatrice Curtis as Lois Saunders
- Kenne Duncan as J.W. Carlton
- Lloyd Ingraham as Dr. Ingram
- Richard Beach as Bill Saunders
- Patti Lacey as Patsy
- Evelyn Mulhall as Manager of 'The Haven'
- Symona Boniface as Nurse at 'The Manger'
- Donald Kerr as Nan's P.R. Man
- Jimmy Aubrey as Motel Manager
- Ethelreda Leopold as The Hitch-hiker
- Richard Lee Spitz as Baby Bill

== Bibliography ==
- Pitts, Michael R. Poverty Row Studios, 1929–1940. McFarland & Company, 2005.
