= Overland Trails (film) =

1948 Film

- Theatrical release poster
- Directed by: Lambert Hillyer
- Screenplay by: Adele Buffington
- Produced by: Barney Sarecky
- Starring: Johnny Mack Brown; Raymond Hatton; Virginia Belmont; Bill Kennedy; Virginia Carroll; Mike Ragan
- Cinematography: Harry Neumann
- Edited by: John C. Fuller
- Production company: Monogram Pictures
- Distributed by: Monogram Pictures
- Release date: January 31, 1948
- Running time: 58 minutes
- Country: United States
- Language: English

Overland Trails is a 1948 American Western film directed by Lambert Hillyer and written by Adele Buffington. The film stars Johnny Mack Brown, Raymond Hatton, Virginia Belmont, Bill Kennedy, Virginia Carroll, and Mike Ragan. The film was released on January 31, 1948, by Monogram Pictures.

== Cast ==
- Johnny Mack Brown as Johnny Murdock
- Raymond Hatton as Dusty Hanover
- Virginia Belmont as Marcia Brandon
- Bill Kennedy as Carter Morgan
- Virginia Carroll as Mary Cramer
- Mike Ragan as Rex Hillman
- Ted Adams as Matt Cramer
- Steve Darrell as Marc Brandon
- Lanny Rees as Bud Cramer
- Carl Mathews as Steve Tully
- Milburn Morante as Brooks
- Bob Woodward as Ed
- Boyd Stockman as Joe
- George Peters as Paul
