= Outlaws of Texas =

1950 film by Thomas Carr

- Theatrical release poster
- Directed by: Thomas Carr
- Screenplay by: Daniel B. Ullman
- Produced by: Vincent M. Fennelly
- Starring: Whip Wilson; Andy Clyde; Phyllis Coates; Terry Frost; Tommy Farrell; Zon Murray
- Cinematography: Gilbert Warrenton
- Edited by: Richard Heermance
- Production company: Monogram Pictures
- Distributed by: Monogram Pictures
- Release date: December 10, 1950
- Running time: 56 minutes
- Country: United States
- Language: English

Outlaws of Texas is a 1950 American Western film directed by Thomas Carr, written by Daniel B. Ullman and starring Whip Wilson, Andy Clyde, Phyllis Coates, Terry Frost, Tommy Farrell and Zon Murray. The film was released on December 10, 1950, by Monogram Pictures.

== Cast ==
- Whip Wilson as Tom Yeager
- Andy Clyde as Hungry Rogers
- Phyllis Coates as Annie Moore
- Terry Frost as Jordan
- Tommy Farrell as Jeff Johnson
- Zon Murray as Wilkins
- George DeNormand as Bilson
- Stephen Carr as Sheriff
- Stanley Price as Bill Moore
