= Stagecoach Driver =

1951 film by Lewis D. Collins

- Theatrical film poster
- Directed by: Lewis D. Collins
- Written by: Joseph O'Donnell
- Produced by: Vincent M. Fennelly
- Starring: Whip Wilson; Fuzzy Knight; Gloria Winters
- Cinematography: Ernest Miller
- Edited by: Sam Fields
- Music by: Raoul Kraushaar
- Production company: Frontier Pictures
- Distributed by: Monogram Pictures
- Release date: July 15, 1951
- Running time: 56 minutes
- Country: United States
- Language: English

Stagecoach Driver is a 1951 American Western film directed by Lewis D. Collins and starring Whip Wilson, Fuzzy Knight and Gloria Winters.

The film's sets were designed by the art director Harry Reif.

== Cast ==
- Whip Wilson as Whip Wilson
- Fuzzy Knight as Texas McGillicudy
- Jim Bannon as Jim Bannon
- Lane Bradford as henchman Sam Jenkins
- Gloria Winters as Sue Cassidy
- Pierce Lyden as Larry Edwards
- Barbara Woodell as Kate Cassidy
- Leonard Penn as George Barnes
- Marshall Reed as Sheriff
- Stanley Price as henchman
- John Hart as Slim Cole
