= Man from Sonora =

1951 film by Lewis D. Collins

- Theatrical release poster
- Directed by: Lewis D. Collins
- Screenplay by: Maurice Tombragel
- Produced by: Vincent M. Fennelly
- Starring: Johnny Mack Brown; Phyllis Coates; Lyle Talbot; House Peters Jr. Lee Roberts; Dennis Moore
- Cinematography: Gilbert Warrenton
- Edited by: Fred Maguire
- Production company: Monogram Pictures
- Distributed by: Monogram Pictures
- Release date: March 11, 1951
- Running time: 54 minutes
- Country: United States
- Language: English

Man from Sonora is a 1951 American Western film directed by Lewis D. Collins, written by Maurice Tombragel and starring Johnny Mack Brown, Phyllis Coates and Lyle Talbot. The film was released on March 11, 1951 by Monogram Pictures.

== Cast ==
- Johnny Mack Brown as Johnny Mack Brown
- Phyllis Coates as Cinthy Allison
- Lyle Talbot as Sheriff Frank Casey
- House Peters Jr. as Ed Hooper
- Lee Roberts as Duke Mantell
- Dennis Moore as Wesley Carrol
- John Merton as Pete
- Stanley Price as Spence
