= Lewis D. Collins =

American film director and occasional screenwriter

- Born: January 12, 1899; Baltimore, Maryland, U.S.
- Died: August 24, 1954 (aged 55); Hollywood, California, U.S.
- Other names: Lew Collins; Lewis Collins
- Occupations: Film director; Screenwriter
- Years active: 1922–1954

Lewis D. Collins (January 12, 1899 – August 24, 1954) was an American film director and occasional screenwriter. In his career spanning over 30 years, he churned out dozens of Westerns.

== Career ==
Born in Baltimore, Maryland, Collins' film career began in 1922, when films were still silent, and continued into the sound era. He directed about 120 films between then and his death in Hollywood in 1954, among them The Desert Trail in 1935, working with actors such as John Wayne and Paul Fix.

== Filmography ==
- When Bonita Rode (1926, Director)
- Whirlwind Driver (1926, Director)
- The Fighting Strain (1926, Director)
- The Galloping Gobs (1927, writer)
- Under the Southern Cross (1929)
- Young Desire (1930)
- The Law of the Tong (1931)
- Guns for Hire (1932)
- His Private Secretary (1933, writer)
- Skyway (1933)
- Gun Law (1933)
- Trouble Busters (1933)
- Ship of Wanted Men (1933)
- Via Pony Express (1933)
- Sing Sing Nights (1934)
- Ticket to a Crime (1934)
- Public Stenographer (1934)
- The Man from Hell (1934)
- The Brand of Hate (1934)
- Make a Million (1935)
- The Desert Trail (1935)
- Manhattan Butterfly (1935)
- The Hoosier Schoolmaster (1935)
- The Spanish Cape Mystery (1935)
- The Leavenworth Case (1936)
- The Return of Jimmy Valentine (1936)
- Doughnuts and Society (1936)
- Down to the Sea (1936)
- Lucky Corrigan (1936)
- Under Suspicion (1937)
- The Mighty Treve (1937)
- The Wildcatter (1937)
- Trapped by G-Men (1937)
- Reformatory (1938)
- Flight into Nowhere (1938)
- Crime Takes a Holiday (1938)
- Making the Headlines (1938)
- The Strange Case of Dr. Meade (1938)
- Fugitive at Large (1939)
- Whispering Enemies (1939)
- Trapped in the Sky (1939)
- Hidden Power (1939)
- Outside the Three-Mile Limit (1940)
- Passport to Alcatraz (1940)
- Fugitive from a Prison Camp (1940)
- The Great Plane Robbery (1940)
- Borrowed Hero (1941)
- The Great Swindle (1941)
- Danger in the Pacific (1942)
- Little Joe, the Wrangler (1942)
- Junior G-Men of the Air (1942, serial)
- The Adventures of Smilin' Jack (1943, serial)
- Don Winslow of the Coast Guard (1943, serial)
- Adventures of the Flying Cadets (1943, serial)
- Tenting Tonight on the Old Camp Ground (1943)
- Raiders of San Joaquin (1943)
- Sweethearts of the U.S.A. (1944)
- Oklahoma Raiders (1944)
- The Great Alaskan Mystery (1944, serial)
- Raiders of Ghost City (1944, serial)
- Mystery of the River Boat (1944, serial)
- Trigger Trail (1944)
- The Old Texas Trail (1944)
- Jungle Queen (1945, serial)
- The Master Key (1945, serial)
- Secret Agent X-9 (1945, serial)
- The Royal Mounted Rides Again (1945, serial)
- The Scarlet Horseman (1946, serial)
- Lost City of the Jungle (1946, serial)
- The Mysterious Mr. M (1946)
- Danger Woman (1946)
- Killer Dill (1947)
- Heading for Heaven (1947)
- Jungle Goddess (1948)
- The Fighting Redhead (1949)
- Cowboy and the Prizefighter (1949)
- Roll, Thunder, Roll! (1949)
- Ride, Ryder, Ride! (1949)
- Law of the Panhandle (1950)
- Cherokee Uprising (1950)
- Hot Rod (1950)
- Colorado Ambush (1951)
- Abilene Trail (1951)
- Oklahoma Justice (1951)
- Man from Sonora (1951)
- Nevada Badmen (1951)
- Stage to Blue River (1951)
- Canyon Raiders (1951)
- Stagecoach Driver (1951)
- Lawless Cowboys (1951)
- The Longhorn (1951)
- Texas Lawmen (1951)
- Texas City (1952)
- The Gunman (1952)
- Wild Stallion (1952)
- Kansas Territory (1952)
- Fargo (1952)
- Dead Man's Trail (1952)
- Canyon Ambush (1952)
- Waco (1952)
- Montana Incident (1952)
- The Marksman (1953)
- Vigilante Terror (1953)
- Texas Bad Man (1953)
- The Homesteaders (1953)
- Two Guns and a Badge (1954)
