= Drifting Along =

1946 film by Derwin Abrahams

- Directed by: Derwin Abrahams
- Written by: Adele Buffington
- Produced by: Scott R. Dunlap
- Starring: Johnny Mack Brown; Lynne Carver; Raymond Hatton
- Cinematography: Carroll Lewis
- Edited by: Richard Fantl
- Music by: Edward J. Kay
- Production company: Great Western Productions
- Distributed by: Monogram Pictures
- Release date: January 26, 1946
- Running time: 60 minutes
- Country: United States
- Language: English

Drifting Along is a 1946 American Western film directed by Derwin Abrahams and starring Johnny Mack Brown, Lynne Carver and Raymond Hatton.

== Cast ==
- Johnny Mack Brown as Steve Garner
- Lynne Carver as Pat McBride
- Raymond Hatton as Pawnee Jones
- Douglas Fowley as Jack Dailey
- Smith Ballew as Band Singer Smith
- Milburn Morante as Zeke the Cook
- Thornton Edwards as Cowhand Pedro
- Steve Clark as Lou Woods
- Marshall Reed as Henchman Slade Matthews
- Jack Rockwell as Sheriff Devers
- Lynton Brent as Henchman Joe
- Terry Frost as Henchman Gus
- Leonard St. Lee as Henchman Red
- Ted Mapes as Henchman Ted
- Curt Barrett as Guitar Player
- Curt Barrett and the Trailsmen as Musicians

== Bibliography ==
- Bernard A. Drew. Motion Picture Series and Sequels: A Reference Guide. Routledge, 2013.
