= Blazing Bullets =

1951 film by Wallace Fox

- Directed by: Wallace Fox
- Written by: George Daniels
- Produced by: Vincent M. Fennelly
- Starring: Johnny Mack Brown; Lois Hall; Stanley Price
- Cinematography: Gilbert Warrenton
- Edited by: Fred Maguire
- Music by: Ozzie Caswell
- Production company: Frontier Pictures
- Distributed by: Monogram Pictures
- Release date: May 6, 1951
- Running time: 51 minutes
- Country: United States
- Language: English

Blazing Bullets is a 1951 American Western film directed by Wallace Fox and starring Johnny Mack Brown, Lois Hall and Stanley Price.

== Cast ==
- Johnny Mack Brown as Marshal Johnny Mack Brown
- Lois Hall as Carol Roberts
- House Peters Jr. as Bill Grant
- Stanley Price as Hawkins
- Dennis Moore as Crowley
- Edmund Cobb as Sheriff
- Milburn Morante as Andy Mullins
- Forrest Taylor as John Roberts

== Bibliography ==
- Boyd Magers & Michael G. Fitzgerald. Westerns Women: Interviews with 50 Leading Ladies of Movie and Television Westerns from the 1930s to the 1960s. McFarland, 2004.
