= Colorado Ambush =

1951 film directed by Lewis D. Collins

- Lobby card
- Directed by: Lewis D. Collins
- Written by: Myron Healey
- Produced by: Vincent M. Fennelly
- Starring: Johnny Mack Brown; Lois Hall; Myron Healey
- Cinematography: Gilbert Warrenton
- Edited by: Fred Maguire
- Music by: Edward J. Kay
- Production company: Transwestern Pictures
- Distributed by: Monogram Pictures
- Release date: January 14, 1951
- Running time: 52 minutes
- Country: United States
- Language: English

Colorado Ambush is a 1951 American Western film directed by Lewis D. Collins and produced by Vincent M. Fennelly. It stars Johnny Mack Brown, Lois Hall and Myron Healey, who also wrote the screenplay for the film.

== Cast ==
- Johnny Mack Brown as Johnny Mack Brown
- Lois Hall as Janet Williams
- Myron Healey as Chet Murdock
- Tommy Farrell as Terry Williams
- Christine McIntyre as Mae Star
- Lee Roberts as Henchman Gus
- Marshall Bradford as Ben Williams
- Lyle Talbot as Sheriff Ed Lowery
