= Canyon Raiders =

1951 film by Lewis D. Collins

- Theatrical film poster
- Directed by: Lewis D. Collins
- Written by: Jay Gilgore
- Produced by: Vincent M. Fennelly
- Starring: Whip Wilson; Fuzzy Knight; Phyllis Coates
- Cinematography: Ernest Miller
- Edited by: Richard V. Heermance
- Music by: Raoul Kraushaar
- Production company: Frontier Pictures
- Distributed by: Monogram Pictures
- Release date: April 8, 1951
- Running time: 54 minutes
- Country: United States
- Language: English

Canyon Raiders is a 1951 American Western film directed by Lewis D. Collins and starring Whip Wilson, Fuzzy Knight and Phyllis Coates.

== Plot ==
A gang of horse thieves has stopped the army from acquiring remounts. Whip rides in to meet his buddy Jim to resolve the matter.

== Cast ==
- Whip Wilson as Whip Wilson
- Fuzzy Knight as Texas Milburn
- Jim Bannon as Jim Bannon
- Phyllis Coates as Alice Long
- I. Stanford Jolley as Sam Wellman
- Barbara Woodell as Ruth Milburn
- Marshall Reed as henchman Jack Marlin
- Riley Hill as henchman Lou Banks
