= Barbara Woodell =

American actress (1910–1997)

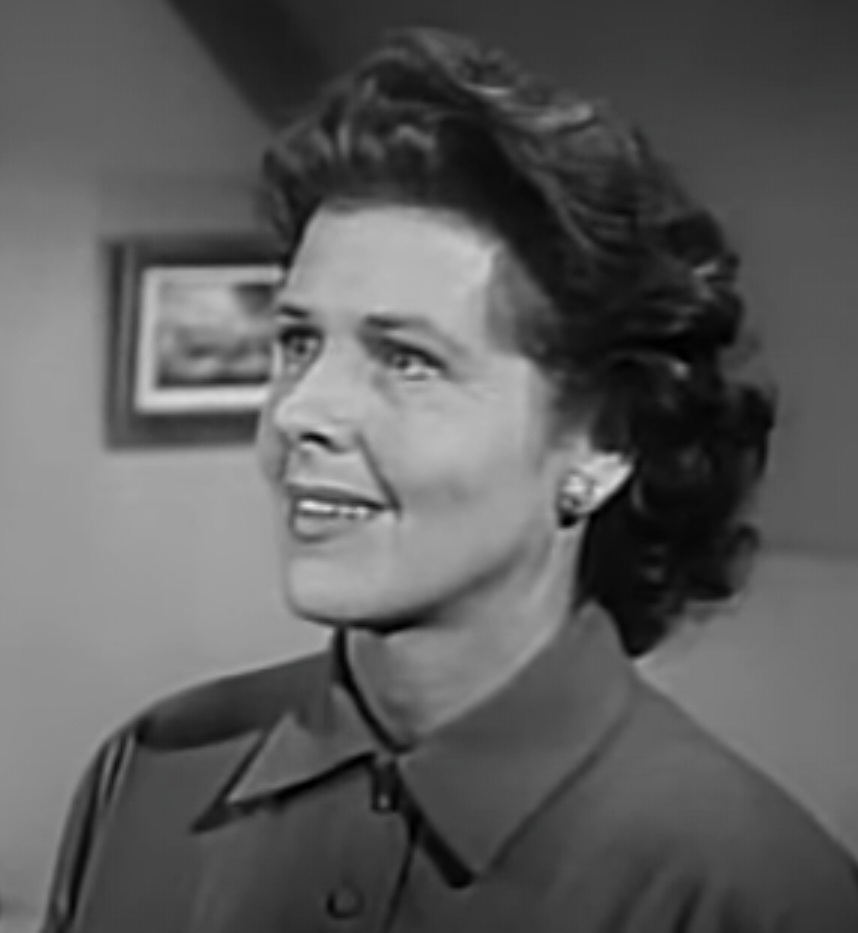
- Woodell in an episode of Medic (1955)
- Born: Barbara Mae Smith; May 25, 1910; Lewistown, Illinois, U.S.
- Died: January 16, 1997 (aged 86); Ojai, California
- Other names: Barbara Cornett, Barbara Allen
- Occupation: Actress
- Years active: 1911–1964
- Spouse: Oscar Levant (m. 1932; div. 1933) Arthur M. Loew (divorced)

Barbara Woodell (born Barbara Mae Smith; May 25, 1910 – January 16, 1997) was an American stage, film and television actress, born in Lewistown, Illinois. Taking the stage name Woodell after her grandmother's name, she was married to composer Oscar Levant, later to Arthur Loew (son of film magnate Marcus Loew). She also sang under the name Barbara Allen. In later years, after retiring from show business, she opened an interior design studio in Carmel Valley, California. She died in Ojai, California, at the age of 86.

== Selected filmography ==
- Lady, Let's Dance (1944)
- The Mysterious Mr. Valentine (1946)
- Framed (1947)
- The Unsuspected (1947)
- I Shot Jesse James (1949)
- State Department: File 649 (1949)
- My Foolish Heart (1949)
- Canyon Raiders (1951)
- The Rose Bowl Story (1952)
- The Great Jesse James Raid (1953)
- Westward Ho the Wagons! (1956)
- Bullwhip (1958)

== Bibliography ==
- Renzi, Thomas. Screwball Comedy and Film Noir: Unexpected Connections. McFarland, 2012.
