= Terry Frost (actor) =

American actor (1906–1993)

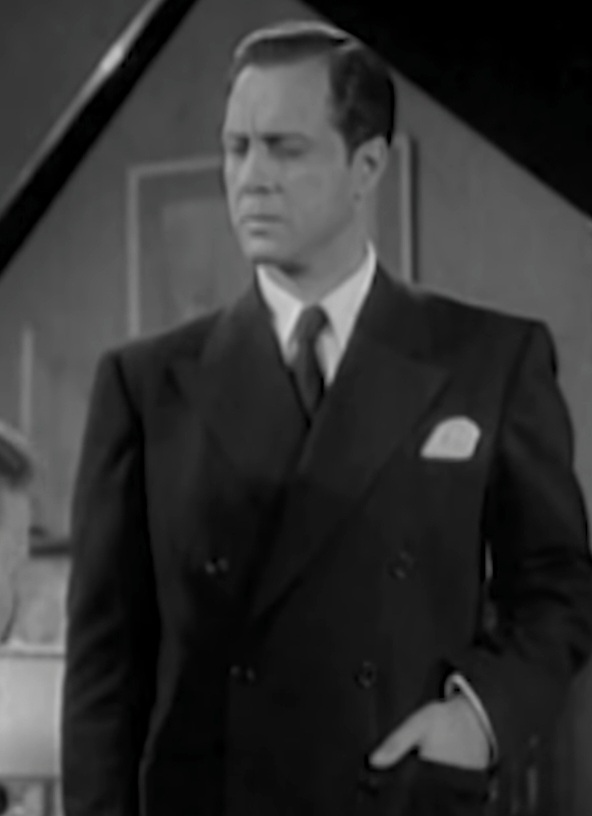
- Frost in The Monster Maker (1944)
- Born: Terry Lawrence Frost; October 26, 1906; Bemidji, Minnesota, U.S.
- Died: March 1, 1993 (aged 86); Los Angeles, California U.S.
- Occupation: Actor
- Years active: 1941–1966
- Spouses: Marguerite Beday (m. 1940; died 1974) Marion Carney (m. 1983)
- Children: 2

Terry Lawrence Frost (October 26, 1906 – March 1, 1993) was an American actor who appeared in dozens of Western films during the 1940s and 1950s.

== Biography ==
Frost was born in Bemidji, Minnesota.

Before he became an actor, he spent six years working as a cowboy, jack-of-all-trades, lumberjack, miner, and salesman across the United States.

Frost began his entertainment career in vaudeville in 1929. In 1941, his film career began when he portrayed Sam Emery in Law of the Range. He spent the 1940s and 1950s appearing in dozens of B-movie westerns for the studios Monogram and PRC, including roles in The Maverick, Outlaws of Texas, The Girl from Monterey, and Desert Legion.

During the 1950s Frost was heavily involved with television. He appeared often in series TV, with feature roles on many, such as I Led 3 Lives, Waterfront, Boston Blackie, and Mr. District Attorney, and a recurring role as Sergeant Morris in Highway Patrol. Frost appeared in almost every Western series ever produced, including The Gene Autry Show, Gunsmoke, Rawhide, Cheyenne (as Dan Naylor in the 1957 episode "Top Hand"), Annie Oakley, and The Lone Ranger.

During the 1960s, his acting career slowed considerably, with his last film appearance in Magnifico extranjero, El in 1967. During this period he taught drama at Patricia Stevens Career Colleges in Pasadena and Los Angeles, authored a text on the art of acting, "Actors Only," and worked in regional theater throughout the United States. He also worked in public relations for a travel company.

Frost visited every continent, proclaiming New Zealand the most beautiful place on Earth. Once retired, he became a popular guest speaker at various B-Western conventions in the United States and the British Isles, where he entertained the audiences with reminiscences about everyone from Johnny Mack Brown to Whip Wilson.

Frost died of a heart attack in Los Angeles, California.

== Selected filmography ==
- Law of the Range (1941) – Sam Emery
- Rustlers' Hideout (1944)
- The Caravan Trail (1946)
- Wild West (1946)
- Drifting Along (1946)
- Silver Range (1946)
- Black Hills (1947)
- Stage to Mesa City (1947) – Henchman Ed Williams
- Check Your Guns (1948)
- Dead Man's Gold (1948)
- The Hawk of Powder River (1948)
- Oklahoma Badlands (1948)
- The Pecos Pistol (1949)
- Thief of Damascus (1952) – Ali Baba's Aide
- The Maverick (1952) – Trooper Westman
- Dead Man's Trail (1952) – Deputy Kelvin
- Night Raiders (1952) – Mike Lorch
- Waco (1952)
- Kansas Territory (1952)
- The Gunman (1952)
- Siren of Bagdad (1953) – Hamid's Man
- (1955) -Highway. Patrol SPM
- Wanted Dead or Alive (TV series) (1960) season 2 episode 27 (The Pariah) : Ben Bronson
- Rawhide (1961) – Pollet in S3:E25, "Incident of the Running Man"
