= Whip Wilson =

American actor (1911–64)

- Born: Roland Charles Meyers; June 16, 1911; Granite City, Illinois, U.S.
- Died: October 22, 1964 (aged 53); Los Angeles, California
- Resting place: Sunset Hill Cemetery, Glen Carbon, Illinois
- Occupation: Film actor
- Years active: 1946–1955
- Spouse: Monica H. Heberlie Meyers (m. 1938–1964) (his death)

Whip Wilson (born Roland Charles Meyers, June 16, 1911 – October 22, 1964) was an American cowboy film star of the late 1940s and into the 1950s, known for his roles in B-movie Westerns.

He was one of eight children. Wilson had been a moderately successful singer before coming to Hollywood. Following Buck Jones's death in the famous Cocoanut Grove fire of 1942, which claimed the lives of 492 people, Monogram Pictures had been searching for someone to replace him. Producer Scott R. Dunlap saw Meyers, and thought he looked similar to Jones. Apparently, this was enough to build him into a cowboy star. Because of the fame being generated by Lash LaRue, who used a bullwhip in his films, Monogram decided to make Meyers a similar whip-wielding character, renaming him Whip Wilson.

== Movie career ==
Wilson was a good-looking man. When he first moved to Hollywood to pursue an acting career, producers built him up with a lot of press, but it was enough to take him to the height of major stardom. He did star in 22 B-movie Westerns, more than Lash LaRue, Sunset Carson, Monte Hale, Rex Allen, or Eddie Dean.

Monogram Pictures introduced Wilson to the public this way: "He was born on a fabulous ranch in Pecos, Texas, was a rodeo champion, has an engineering degree, is a direct descendant of General Custer, and he was a World War II Marine hero, and he does his own movie stunts." None of these claims was true. In fact, he had not even one shred of experience that could possibly resemble the fictional persona that Monogram created for him. He was one of the very few Western film heroes of the day who was not a "cowboy" in real life. Most had at least some experience as genuine cowboys or cowgirls, and fit the part. Many had also actually served during World War II.

His first film role was playing a sheriff (uncredited) in God's Country (1946), followed by a co-starring role alongside Monogram's singing cowboy Jimmy Wakely in the 1948 film Silver Trails, both of which gave him experience in front of the camera. The next year, Whip Wilson starred in his own series of films, the first being Crashin Thru, followed by Haunted Trails, Range Land, and Riders of the Dusk. He first was given a horse named "Silver Bullet", whose name was later shortened to "Bullet", then changed to "Rocket" due to Roy Rogers having a dog named "Bullet" in his films.

Wilson may have come along too late to establish himself as a major star; studios were already phasing out low-budget Westerns. Veteran comedian Andy Clyde (as "Winks" Grayson) was a valuable asset as co-star, but the series got little attention. After 12 films, Clyde left the cast, replaced by Fuzzy Knight (playing his sidekick "Texas") and later by Jim Bannon. In 1950, Wilson starred in Gunslingers, Arizona Territory, Cherokee Uprising, Fence Riders, and Outlaws of Texas. In 1951, his character continued in Lawless Cowboys, Stage to Blue River, Canyon Raiders, and Abilene Trail.

Nothing was novel or original about Wilson to distinguish himself from other cowboy stars. The name of his horse, the bullwhip gimmick, and the false past created by his publicity agents were all derivative. Wilson's career never really took off, and by 1952, his Hollywood career was all but over, with him starring in Night Raiders and his last film, Wyoming Roundup. He appeared uncredited in a 1953 Western The Silver Whip, then was hired to perform the whip scenes in the 1955 Burt Lancaster film The Kentuckian. It was the last film on which he worked. He later appeared as a guest on TV's You Asked for It, giving a bullwhip demonstration.

== Personal life ==
He married three times, and lived his last years with his third wife managing an apartment complex in Hollywood. On October 22, 1964, Wilson died of a heart attack at the age of 53.

== Legacy ==
Wilson made little impact on the Western film industry, although three issues of a Whip Wilson comic book series were published by Marvel Comics in 1950, curiously as numbers 9, 10, and 11. Issue #11 was later reprinted in 1965 by I.W. Comics. Many of his co-stars, in later years, indicated they never really appreciated his films, but they did appreciate his kind demeanor and his character.

Years after his death, his widow, Monica Wilson, stated; "He was handsome, intelligent, had a beautiful personality, a sense of humor, a good lover and a wonderful husband. Our love was proven love. We were asked many times in Hollywood how we stayed together. Our answer was true love will survive."

Sixteen of his films are available on DVD today.

== List of "Whip Wilson" feature films ==
- Crashing Thru (1949) co-starring Tristram Coffin, Kenne Duncan
- Haunted Trails (1949) co-starring Myron Healy
- Riders of the Dusk (1949) co-starring Tristram Coffin, Myron Healy
- Range Land (1949) co-starring Kermit Maynard, Kenne Duncan
- Shadows of the West (1949) co-starring Kenne Duncan
- Fence Riders (1950) co-starring Myron Healy
- Gunslingers (1950) co-starring Andy Clyde and Reno Browne
- Cherokee Uprising (1950) co-starring Fuzzy Knight and Lois Hall
- Outlaws of Texas (1950) co-starring Phyllis Coates
- Dead or Alive (1951) co-starring Fuzzy Knight
- Stagecoach Driver (1951) co-starring Fuzzy Knight, John Hart
- Nevada Badmen (1951) co-starring Fuzzy Knight, Phyllis Coates
- Canyon Raiders (1951) co-starring Fuzzy Knight, Phyllis Coates
- Lawless Cowboys (1951) co-starring Fuzzy Knight
- Stage to Blue River (1951) co-starring Fuzzy Knight, Phyllis Coates, and John Hart
- Night Raiders (1952) co-starring Fuzzy Knight, Lois Hall and Iron Eyes Cody
- The Gunman (1952) co-starring Fuzzy Knight, Phyllis Coates
- Montana Incident (1952) co-starring Noel Neill, Lyle Talbot
- Wyoming Roundup (1952) co-starring Phyllis Coates, Lyle Talbot
- NOTE - He also appeared in four other Westerns in an uncredited (minor role) capacity....God's Country (1946), Silver Trails (1948), The Silver Whip (1953), and the 1955 Burt Lancaster blockbuster The Kentuckian.
