= Daniel B. Ullman =

American dramatist

- Born: October 18, 1918; New York, New York, United States
- Died: October 23, 1979 (aged 61); Los Angeles, California, United States
- Other name: Dan Ullman
- Occupation: Writer
- Years active: 1948–1979 (film)

Daniel Bruce Ullman (October 18, 1918 – October 23, 1979) was an American screenwriter and director.

== Early life ==
Ullman was born in New York, the son of Samuel George Ullman (1893–1975) and Beatrice Ruth Ullman (née Mallet, 1898–1988). He served in the American Army during the Second World War after being drafted in 1941.

== Selected filmography ==
- Ringside (1949)
- Outlaws of Texas (1950)
- Hot Rod (1950)
- Flame of Stamboul (1951)
- Smuggler's Gold (1951)
- The Longhorn (1951)
- Fort Osage (1952)
- Montana Incident (1952)
- Wyoming Roundup (1952)
- Waco (1952)
- Kansas Territory (1952)
- The Royal African Rifles (1953)
- Sudden Danger (1955)
- At Gunpoint (1955)
- Dial Red O (1955)
- Seven Angry Men (1955)
- The Case Against Brooklyn (1958)

== Bibliography ==
- Alan Gevinson. Within Our Gates: Ethnicity in American Feature Films, 1911–1960. University of California Press, 1997.
