= Vincent M. Fennelly =

American film and television producer

- Born: July 5, 1920; Brooklyn, New York, United States
- Died: December 4, 2000 (aged 80); Newport Beach, California; United States
- Other name: Vincent Michael Fennelly
- Occupation: Producer
- Years active: 1950–1970

Vincent M. Fennelly (July 5, 1920 - December 4, 2000) was an American film and television producer.

== Career ==
He worked as a sales manager for Monogram Pictures before graduating in 1950 to produce pictures for the studio and its sister company Allied Artists. He was closely involved in the production of western films, a large number of which the companies made each year.

== Selected filmography ==
- Arizona Territory (1950)
- Silver Raiders (1950)
- Cherokee Uprising (1950)
- Outlaw Gold (1950)
- Outlaws of Texas (1950)
- Colorado Ambush (1951)
- Abilene Trail (1951)
- Man from Sonora (1951)
- Dead or Alive (1951)
- Canyon Raiders (1951)
- Blazing Bullets (1951)
- Nevada Badmen (1951)
- The Longhorn (1951)
- Montana Desperado (1951)
- Stagecoach Driver (1951)
- Oklahoma Justice (1951)
- Whistling Hills (1951)
- Dead Man's Trail (1952)
- Texas City (1952)
- Man from the Black Hills (1952)
- The Maverick (1952)
- The Gunman (1952)
- Montana Incident (1952)
- Kansas Territory (1952)
- Waco (1952)
- Wyoming Roundup (1952)
- Fargo (1952)
- Wagons West (1952)
- Star of Texas (1953)
- The Homesteaders (1953)
- The Marksman (1953)
- Rebel City (1953)
- Fighting Lawman (1953)
- Topeka (1953)
- Vigilante Terror (1953)
- Texas Bad Man (1953)
- Bitter Creek (1954)
- The Forty-Niners (1954)
- The Desperado (1954)
- Two Guns and a Badge (1954)
- At Gunpoint (1955)
- Seven Angry Men (1955)
- Dial Red O (1955)
- Bobby Ware Is Missing (1955)
- Crime in the Streets (1956)
- Last of the Badmen (1957)
- Guns of the Magnificent Seven (1969)
- Cannon for Cordoba (1970)

== Bibliography ==
- Arthur Lyons & Eugene Lyons. Death On The Cheap: The Lost B Movies. Da Capo Press, 2007.
