= Richard Heermance =

American film producer

- Born: February 21, 1910; New York, New York, United States
- Died: January 10, 1971 (aged 60); Los Angeles, California; United States
- Occupations: Producer, Editor
- Years active: 1944–1971

Richard V. Heermance (February 21, 1910 – January 10, 1971) was an American film producer and film editor. In one round of the October 14, 1958 edition of the television game show To Tell The Truth, he appeared as one of 'three challengers (correctly) claiming to be' the brother of its popular host, actor Bud Collyer. Actress June Collyer was his sister.

== Selected filmography ==
- Abroad with Two Yanks (1944)
- Song of My Heart (1948)
- County Fair (1950)
- Canyon Raiders (1951)
- The Longhorn (1951)
- The Rose Bowl Story (1952)
- Wild Stallion (1952)
- Kansas Territory (1952)
- Fort Osage (1952)
- Roar of the Crowd (1953)
- The Royal African Rifles (1953)
- The Maze (1953)

== Bibliography ==
- Alan Gevinson. Within Our Gates: Ethnicity in American Feature Films, 1911-1960. University of California Press, 1997.
