= Marshall Reed =

American actor (1917–1980)

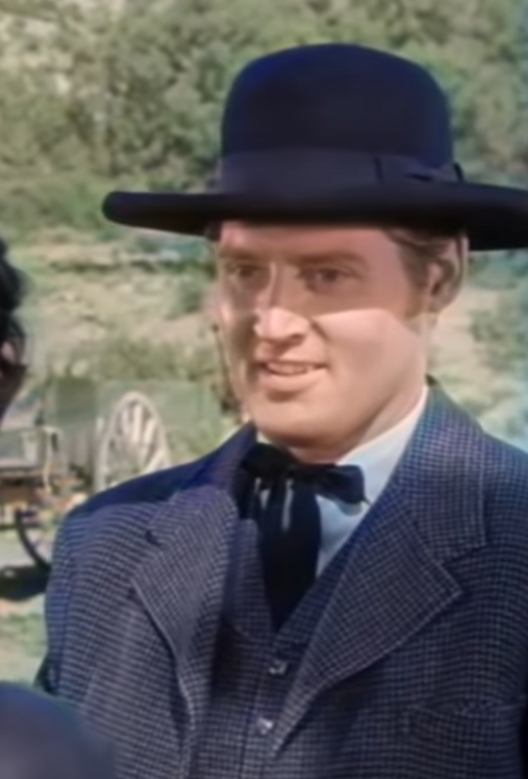
- Reed in Angel and the Badman (1947)
- Born: Marshall Jewel Reed; May 28, 1917; Englewood, Colorado, U.S.
- Died: April 15, 1980 (aged 62); Los Angeles, California, U.S.
- Occupation: Actor
- Years active: 1943–1978
- Spouse(s): Carlyn Miller (m. 19??)

Marshall Jewel Reed (May 28, 1917 – April 15, 1980) was an American actor who appeared in over 200 films between 1943 and 1978. He was born in Englewood, Colorado.

== Early years ==
Reed's parents were Walter George Reed and Ruth Dustin. By age 10, he was acting in children's theater, and he managed two drama groups while he was in high school. Before becoming a professional actor, "he held various odd jobs such as horse trainer, meter reader, bookkeeper, and mail clerk."

== Stage ==
Summer stock theatre at Elitch Gardens in Denver, Colorado, provided Reed's first professional experience with acting. Besides appearing in plays there, he made costumes and constructed scenery. Later he worked with other theatrical groups in the Denver area, writing and producing as well as acting. Still later, he had his own stock company on the West Coast and acted in summer stock in New York and Los Angeles.

== Film ==
Reed started his cinema career in Bordertown Gun Fighters, a 1943 western starring Wild Bill Elliott. (Another source says, "He made his screen debut in Silver Spurs (1943).")

An athletic stuntman, Reed handled much of his own fighting and riding. Over the years, he did dozens of westerns and cliffhanger serials for Columbia and Republic studios, in which he was usually cast as action heavies. He appeared in a rare sympathetic role as Buffalo Bill Cody in the 1954 serial Riding with Buffalo Bill.

== Television ==
Between the 1950s and 1970s, Reed was a familiar face in popular TV series, particularly in the action and drama genres.

In 1960, he appeared twice on Gene Barry's TV Western series Bat Masterson, once playing the "good guy" as stage coach driver and posse member "Alf Hayman" in S2E22's "The Snare", and another time playing the "bad guy" as a murdering outlaw named "Romer" in S3E7's "High Card Loses".

He also played Inspector Fred Asher in The Lineup. In 1978 he costarred in Till Death, his last film appearance.

== Death ==
Reed "died of a massive hemorrhage following a brain tumor" April 15, 1980, in Los Angeles, California, at the age of 62. Survivors included his fifth wife, Carlyn Miller, and a daughter.

== Selected appearances ==
=== Films ===
- Law Men (1944)
- The Tiger Woman (1944, Serial)
- Haunted Harbor (1944, Serial)
- Zorro's Black Whip (1944, Serial)
- Gun Smoke (1945)
- Gentleman Joe Palooka (1946)
- Drifting Along (1946)
- Angel and the Badman (1947)
- Prairie Express (1947)
- Raiders of the South (1947)
- Song of the Wasteland (1947)
- Stage to Mesa City (1947)
- Trailing Danger (1947)
- West of Dodge City (1947)
- Back Trail (1948)
- The Fighting Ranger (1948)
- The Bold Frontiersman (1948)
- Courtin' Trouble (1948)
- Dead Man's Gold (1948)
- Mark of the Lash (1948)
- Hidden Danger (1948)
- Renegades of Sonora (1948)
- Triggerman (1948)
- Brand of Fear (1949)
- Stampede (1949)
- Gun Runner (1949)
- Ghost of Zorro (1949, Serial)
- Law of the West (1949)
- Pirates of the High Seas (1950, Serial)
- Hot Rod (1950)
- Stagecoach Driver (1951)
- Canyon Raiders (1951)
- The Longhorn (1951)
- Dead or Alive (1951)
- Mysterious Island (1951, Serial)
- Night Raiders (1952)
- Montana Incident (1952)
- Kansas Territory (1952)
- Laramie Mountains (1952)
- Son of Geronimo (1952, Serial)
- Blackhawk (1952, Serial)
- The Great Adventures of Captain Kidd (1953, Serial)
- Gunfighters of the Northwest (1954, Serial)
- Riding with Buffalo Bill (1954, Serial)
- The Night the World Exploded (1957)
- The Lineup (1958)
- Fate Is the Hunter (1964)
- The Hallelujah Trail (1965)
- Till Death (1978)

=== TV shows ===
- The Marshal of Gunsight Pass (1950) – Larry Thomas
- The Gene Autry Show (1950–1954) – Tom Jenkins / Henchman Coley / First Miller Ranch Hand / Henchman in Denim Jacket / Tom Maraday / Ed, Henchman
- The Cisco Kid (1950–1955) – Dobie / Dick / Whit Jameson / Uncle Wilson Ford / Todd Wheeler / Fred / John Sterns / Henchman / Slade / Blade Meddick / Slick / Frank Tracy / Tom Tracy / Jim Tracy
- The Range Rider (1951–1953) – Hurley / Jud / Red / Ringo Massey aka Chad Walker / Blaze Barnett / Bank Robber / Deputy Charley
- The Adventures of Wild Bill Hickok (1951–1954) – Henchman Jim / DuBois / Targ
- Boston Blackie (1951–1953) – Slick – Henchman
- Hopalong Cassidy (1952–1953) – Rawhide Carney – Henchman / Bob Hayes
- The Adventures of Kit Carson (1952–1954) – Henchman Joe / Taggart Henchman / Henchman
- The Lone Ranger (1952–1955) – Deputy / Grenville aka Vail / Dix Manson
- Adventures of Superman (1953–1954) – Security Agent / Inspector Hill
- Annie Oakley (1954) – Ward / Al / Hired Killer
- The Lineup (1954–1959) – Inspector. Fred Asher
- Captain Midnight (1955) – Portman
- Commando Cody: Sky Marshal of the Universe (1955) – Bill
- Tightrope (1960) – Atkins
- Bat Masterson (1960) – (two appearances) as Alf Hayman /and as Romer
- Shirley Temple's Storybook (1960) – Black Arrow
- Lassie (1961) – Ranger Wes Wade
- Ripcord (1961) – Harvey
- Bonanza (1961–1962) – Party Guest / Hammond
- Lawman (1962) – Jake – Henchman
- Bronco (1962) – Marshal Hank Barton / Harrison
- Checkmate (1962) – Neighbor
- Maverick (1962) – Hatfield
- Gunsmoke (1962) – Sam Vestal
- Perry Mason (1962–1963) – Policeman / Fisherman / First Officer
- Laramie (1963) – Sgt. Nolan
- Death Valley Days (1969–1970) – Harold Graves III / Cal Hinshaw
- Marcus Welby, M.D. (1969–1973) – Matt Callan / Carter
- Dragnet (1969–1970) – Sgt. Norman Bivins / Sgt. Hughes / Fred Deemer / Officer Whitney / Lt. Phil Johnson
- Adam-12 (1970–1971) – Capt. Edwards / John Russell
- The Virginian (1971) – Doctor
- Kung Fu (1975) – Doorman

== See also ==
- List of film serials: 1910–1956
- List of Western films: 1950-1954
