= Ernest Miller (cinematographer) =

American cinematographer

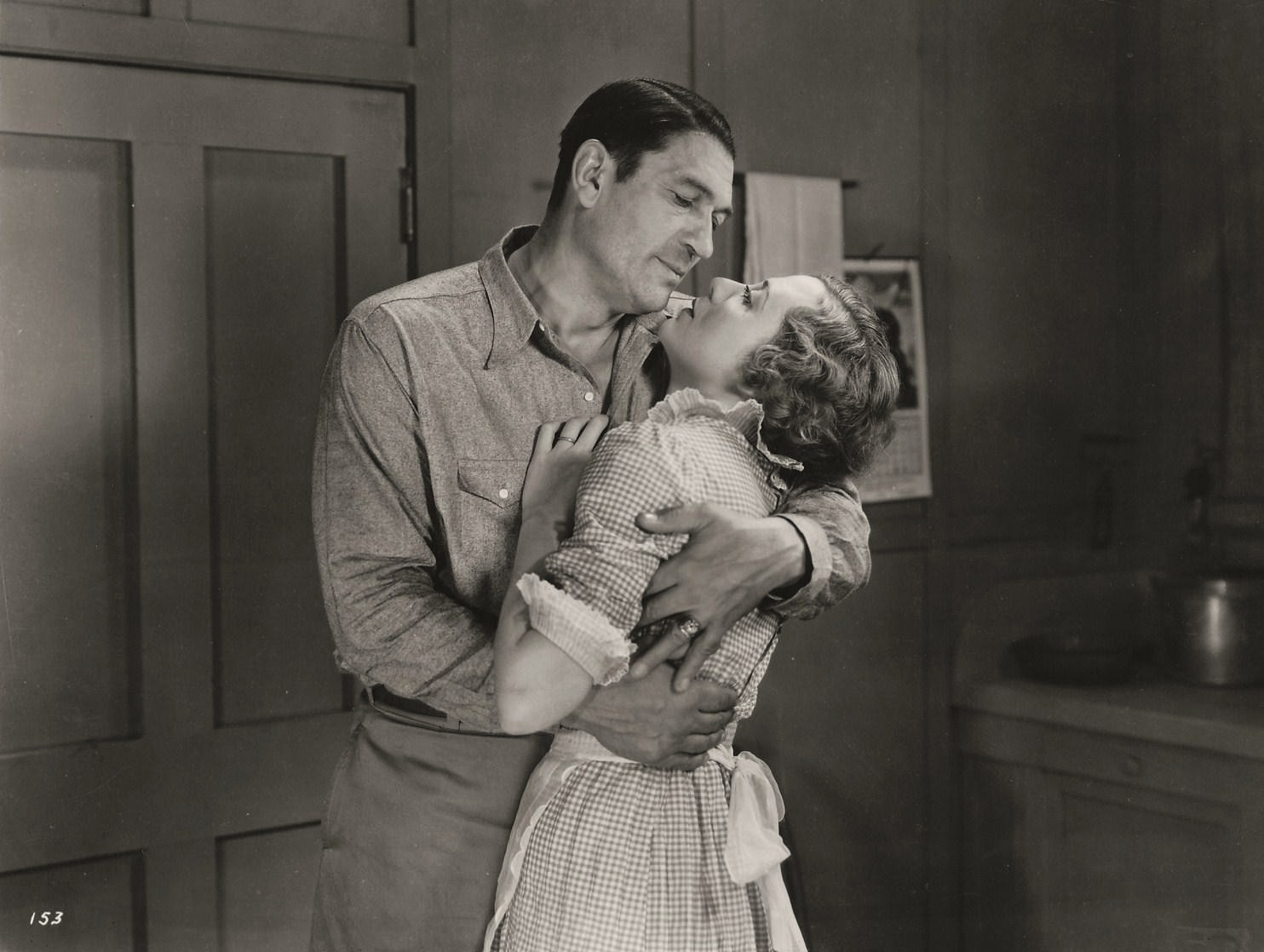
- Victor McLaglen and Lois Wilson in Laughing at Life (1933)
- Born: March 7, 1885; Pasadena, California, US
- Died: April 23, 1957 (aged 72); Los Angeles, California, US
- Occupation: Cinematographer
- Years active: 1921–1956

Ernest Miller (March 7, 1885 – April 23, 1957) was an American cinematographer who was nominated for an Academy Award at the 1939 Oscars for Best Cinematography for the film Army Girl, sharing the nomination with Harry J. Wild. He had nearly 350 film and television credits to his name, mostly Westerns, including some of the early episodes of Gunsmoke. Location work on Army Girl was done primarily at the Iverson Movie Ranch in Chatsworth, Calif., where Miller cut his teeth in B-Westerns and became one of the most prolific—and one of the best—of the site's shooters during the course of his career. His camera work at Iverson became identifiable for Miller's trademark use of the site's charismatic sandstone rock features as framing devices, as he incorporated the giant boulders into the artistry of the outdoor action shots in ways that few cinematographers could match.

== Selected filmography ==
- Beating the Game (1921)
- Refuge (1923)
- Man's Size (1923)
- Chastity (1923)
- Turned Up (1924)
- Virtue's Revolt (1924)
- The Valley of Hate (1924)
- On Probation (1924)
- The Coast Patrol (1925)
- Fair Play (1925)
- Was It Bigamy? (1925)
- The Jazz Girl (1926)
- Sunshine of Paradise Alley (1926)
- Hair-Trigger Baxter (1926)
- The Valley of Bravery (1926)
- Driven from Home (1927)
- Cactus Trails (1927)
- Life of an Actress (1927)
- Bulldog Pluck (1927)
- The Shamrock and the Rose (1927)
- The Fighting Hombre (1927)
- Galloping Thunder (1927)
- Naughty (1927)
- Ladies at Ease (1927)
- Ragtime (1927)
- On to Reno (1928)
- The Night Flyer (1928)
- The Grain of Dust (1928)
- The Albany Night Boat (1928)
- Stormy Waters (1928)
- Molly and Me (1929)
- A Private Scandal (1931)
- The She-Wolf (1931)
- Behind Jury Doors (1932)
- The Pride of the Legion (1932)
- The Whispering Shadow (1933)
- Laughing at Life (1933)
- Neighbors' Wives (1933)
- Alimony Madness (1933)
- Revenge at Monte Carlo (1933)
- Her Resale Value (1933)
- In Old Santa Fe (1934)
- Enlighten Thy Daughter (1934)
- Mystery Mountain (1934)
- Behind the Green Lights (1935)
- Tumbling Tumbleweeds (1935)
- Streamline Express (1935)
- Hearts in Bondage (1936)
- Ticket to Paradise (1936)
- The House of a Thousand Candles (1936)
- Affairs of Cappy Ricks (1937)
- The Wrong Road (1937)
- Exiled to Shanghai (1937)
- Romance on the Run (1938)
- The Old Barn Dance (1938)
- Call of the Yukon (1938)
- Billy the Kid Returns (1938)
- Storm Over Bengal (1938)
- Gangs of New York (1938)
- Woman Doctor (1939)
- Joan of Ozark (1942)
- The Chance of a Lifetime (1943)
- Thumbs Up (1943)
- The Purple V (1943)
- Black Hills Express (1943)
- The Tiger Woman (1944)
- Bells of Rosarita (1945)
- Black Hills (1947)
- Shadow Valley (1947)
- The Enchanted Valley (1948)
- I Shot Jesse James (1949)
- The Steel Helmet (1951)
- Stagecoach Driver (1951)
- Dead or Alive (1951)
- The Longhorn (1951)
- Canyon Raiders (1951)
- Kansas Territory (1952)
- Waco (1952)
- Montana Incident (1952)
- The Gunman (1952)
- Fargo (1952)
