= Sam Fields =

American film editor

- Born: Samuel Finkelstein; January 17, 1916; Illinois
- Died: July 15, 1954 (aged 38); Burbank, California
- Other name: Sammy Fields
- Occupations: Editor, real estate agent
- Years active: 1937–1954
- Spouse: Verna Hellman (m. 1946; died 1954)
- Children: 2
- Relatives: Jackie Fields

Samuel Fields (Samuel Finkelstein, January 17, 1916 – July 15, 1954) was an American film editor. He worked in the film industry since 1937 and became a realtor during the 1940s. He eventually worked as a film editor from 1951 until his death in 1954. He was 38 years old.

He was married to assistant sound editor Verna Fields in May 1946, after meeting her through director Fritz Lang while working on the film The Woman in the Window. After Fields' death, Verna would become a film editor for many films, most notably Jaws. His father-in-law was screenwriter Sam Hellman. His older brother was Jackie Fields, who was a professional boxer.

In 1954, he died of a heart attack at the age of 38. He was in Providence Saint Joseph Medical Center in Burbank, California at the time of his death, and lived in Van Nuys, Los Angeles, California. His funeral service was held at Pierce Brothers Van Nuys on July 18, 1954.

== Selected filmography ==
- Whistling Hills (1951)
- Texas Lawmen (1951)
- Dead or Alive (1951)
- Stagecoach Driver (1951)
- Montana Incident (1952)
- Fargo (1952)
- Waco (1952)
- Dead Man's Trail (1952)
- The Gunman (1952)
- Texas City (1952)
- Jungle Gents (1954)
- The Desperado (1954)
- The Human Jungle (1954)

== Bibliography ==
- Blottner, Gene. Wild Bill Elliott: A Complete Filmography. McFarland, 2007.
