= Raoul Kraushaar =

American composer (1908–2001)

Raoul Kraushaar (August 20, 1908, Paris, France – October 13, 2001, Pompano Beach, Florida) was an American composer who worked on Hollywood feature films in the 1940s and 1950s.

He continued working on low-budget films through the 1960s and 1970s. After that, and up through the 1980s, most of his work centered on television until his retirement; his works included musical compositions for a number of television series, such as The Abbott and Costello Show, Lassie and The Thin Man.

His Romanian-born father, Arnold Adolph Kraushaar (1880-1943), an orchestral musician, brought his wife, Rachel (1881-1918), and their baby son, Raoul, to New York as cabin class passengers on board the French transatlantic steamship, La Provence in April 1910. They settled in New York City.

== Selected filmography ==
- In Old Monterey (1939)
- Melody Ranch (1940)
- Shed No Tears (1948)
- Sky Liner (1949)
- Roll, Thunder, Roll! (1949)
- Timber Fury (1950)
- The Basketball Fix (1951)
- Stagecoach Driver (1951)
- The Longhorn (1951)
- Canyon Raiders (1951)
- Bride of the Gorilla (1951)
- Dead or Alive (1951)
- Jack and the Beanstalk (1952)
- Texas City (1952)
- Waco (1952)
- Fargo (1952)
- Kansas Territory (1952)
- Montana Incident (1952)
- The Gunman (1952)
- The Blue Gardenia (1953)
- Invaders From Mars (1953)
- The Flaming Urge (1953)
- Run for the Hills (1953)
- New Faces (1954)
- The Magnificent Matador (1955)
- Mohawk (1956)
- The Black Whip (1956)
- Curucu, Beast of the Amazon (1956)
- Mustang! (1959)
- Island of Lost Women (1959)
- The 30 Foot Bride of Candy Rock (1959)
- September Storm (1960)
- Jesse James Meets Frankenstein's Daughter (1966)
- Billy the Kid Versus Dracula (1966)
- An Eye for an Eye (1966)
- Cabaret (1972)
- Dirty O'Neil (1974)
- Sixpack Annie (1975)

=== Actor ===
- The Anderson Tapes (1971) - Vic D'Medico - Angelo's Lawyer
