= List of feature film series with seven entries =

This is a list of film series that have seven entries.

Key:

- (A) – Film series is 100% animated
- (a) – Film series is not 100% animated and has live action in a sequel or prequel
- (TV) – made-for-TV
- (V) – direct-to-video
- (*) – TV series attached

== B ==
- Bring It On
  1. Bring It On (2000)
  2. Bring It On Again (2004) (V)
  3. Bring It On: All or Nothing (2006) (V)
  4. Bring It On: In It to Win It (2007) (V)
  5. Bring It On: Fight to the Finish (2009) (V)
  6. Bring It On: Worldwide Cheersmack (2017) (V)
  7. Bring It On: Cheer or Die (2022) (V)

== C ==
- Cinerama Adventures
  1. This is Cinerama (1952)
  2. Cinerama Holiday (1955)
  3. Seven Wonders of the World (1956)
  4. Search for Paradise (1957)
  5. South Seas Adventure (1958)
  6. The Best of Cinerama (1962)
  7. Cinerama's Russian Adventure (1965)
- City Hunter ****
  1. City Hunter: .357 Magnum (1989)
  2. City Hunter: Bay City Wars (1990)
  3. City Hunter: Million Dollar Conspiracy (1990)
  4. City Hunter: The Secret Service (1990) (TV)
  5. City Hunter: Goodbye My Sweetheart (1997) (TV)
  6. City Hunter: Death of the Vicious Criminal Ryo Saeba (1999) (TV)
  7. City Hunter The Movie: Shinjuku Private Eyes (2019)
- The Cohens and Kellys
  1. The Cohens and Kellys (1926)
  2. The Cohens and the Kellys in Paris (1928)
  3. The Cohens and Kellys in Atlantic City (1929)
  4. The Cohens and the Kellys in Scotland (1930)
  5. The Cohens and the Kellys in Africa (1930)
  6. The Cohens and Kellys in Hollywood (1932)
  7. The Cohens and Kellys in Trouble (1933)

== D ==
- Dracula (Universal film series)
  1. Dracula (1931)
  2. Drácula (1931)
  3. Dracula's Daughter (1936)
  4. Son of Dracula (1943)
  5. House of Frankenstein (1944)
  6. House of Dracula (1945)
  7. Abbott and Costello Meet Frankenstein (1948)
- Dr. Dolittle
  1. Doctor Dolittle (1967)
  2. Dr. Dolittle (1998) (remake)
  3. Dr. Dolittle 2 (2001) (remake)
  4. Dr. Dolittle 3 (2006) (V) (remake)
  5. Dr. Dolittle: Tail to the Chief (2008) (V) (remake)
  6. Dr. Dolittle: Million Dollar Mutts (2009) (V) (remake)
  7. Dolittle (2020) (reboot)
- Despicable Me (A)
  1. Despicable Me (2010)
  2. Despicable Me 2 (2013)
  3. Minions (2015) (prequel)
  4. Despicable Me 3 (2017)
  5. Minions: The Rise of Gru (2022) (prequel)
  6. Despicable Me 4 (2024)
  7. Minions & Monsters (2026) (prequel)
- DC Super Hero Girls (A) *
  1. DC Super Hero Girls: Super Hero High (2016) (TV)
  2. DC Super Hero Girls: Hero of the Year (2016) (V)
  3. DC Super Hero Girls: Intergalactic Games (2017) (V)
  4. Lego DC Super Hero Girls: Brain Drain (2017) (V)
  5. Lego DC Super Hero Girls: Super-Villain High (2018) (V)
  6. DC Super Hero Girls: Legends of Atlantis (2018) (V)
  7. Teen Titans Go! & DC Super Hero Girls: Mayhem in the Multiverse (2022) (V)
- Dead End Kids
  1. Dead End (1937)
  2. Crime School (1938)
  3. Angels with Dirty Faces (1938)
  4. They Made Me a Criminal (1939)
  5. Hell's Kitchen (1939)
  6. The Angels Wash Their Faces (1939)
  7. On Dress Parade (1939)
- Doctor *****
  1. Doctor in the House (1954)
  2. Doctor at Sea (1955)
  3. Doctor at Large (1957)
  4. Doctor in Love (1960)
  5. Doctor in Distress (1963)
  6. Doctor in Clover (1966)
  7. Doctor in Trouble (1970)
- Dr. Mabuse (Post-Fritz Lang series)
  1. The Return of Doctor Mabuse (1961)
  2. The Invisible Dr. Mabuse (1962)
  3. The Testament of Dr. Mabuse (1962)
  4. Scotland Yard Hunts Dr. Mabuse (1963)
  5. The Secret of Dr. Mabuse (1964)
  6. The Vengeance of Dr. Mabuse (1970)
  7. Dr. M (1990) (a.k.a. Club Extinction)
- Dr. Orloff
  1. Gritos en la noche (Screams in the Night) (1963) (a.k.a. The Awful Dr. Orloff)
  2. El Secreto del Dr. Orloff (1964)
  3. Miss Muerte (1966)
  4. El Enigma del ataúd (1969)
  5. La vie amoureuse de l'homme invisible (1971)
  6. Los ojos siniestros del doctor Orloff (1973)
  7. El Siniestro doctor Orloff (1982)

*Spanish language reshoot of the 1931 English original.

- Deep Throat
  1. Deep Throat (1972)
  2. Deep Throat Part II (1974)
  3. Deep Throat II (1987)*
  4. Deep Throat 3 (1989)
  5. Deep Throat 4 (1990)
  6. Deep Throat 5 (1991)
  7. Deep Throat 6 (1992)

== E ==
- The Exorcist *
  1. The Exorcist (1973)
  2. Exorcist II: The Heretic (1977)
  3. The Exorcist III (1990) (retcon)
  4. Exorcist: The Beginning (2004) (prequel)
  5. Dominion: Prequel to the Exorcist (2005) (retcon)
  6. The Exorcist: Believer (2023) (retcon)
  7. The Exorcist: Martyrs (2027) (reboot)
- Evil Dead *
  1. The Evil Dead (1981)
  2. Evil Dead II (1987)
  3. Army of Darkness (1992)
  4. Evil Dead (2013) (reboot)
  5. Evil Dead Rise (2023) (reboot)
  6. Evil Dead Burn (2026) (reboot)
  7. Evil Dead Wrath (2028) (prequel)
- Emmanuelle (French film series)
  1. Emmanuelle (1974)
  2. Emmanuelle, The Joys of a Woman (1975)
  3. Goodbye Emmanuelle (1977)
  4. Emmanuelle 4 (1984)
  5. Emmanuelle 5 (1987)
  6. Emmanuelle 6 (1988)
  7. Emmanuelle 7 (1992)

== F ==
- Frankenstein (Hammer film series)
  1. The Curse of Frankenstein (1957)
  2. The Revenge of Frankenstein (1958)
  3. The Evil of Frankenstein (1964)
  4. Frankenstein Created Woman (1967)
  5. Frankenstein Must Be Destroyed (1969)
  6. The Horror of Frankenstein (1970)
  7. Frankenstein and the Monster from Hell (1974)
- Fabian Bom
  1. Soldat Bom (1948)
  2. Pappa Bom (1949)
  3. Tull-Bom (1951)
  4. Flyg-Bom (1952)
  5. Dum-Bom (1953)
  6. Flottans överman (1958)
  7. Bara en kypare (1959)
- Far til fire (2005)
  1. Far til fire - gi'r aldrig op (2005)
  2. Far til fire - i stor stil (2006)
  3. Far til fire - på hjemmebane (2008)
  4. Far til fire - på japansk (2010)
  5. Far til fire - tilbage til naturen (2011)
  6. Far til fire - til søs (2012)
  7. Far til fire - Onkel Sofus vender tilbage (2014)
- Francis the Talking Mule
  1. Francis (1950)
  2. Francis Goes to the Races (1951)
  3. Francis Goes to West Point (1952)
  4. Francis Covers the Big Town (1953)
  5. Francis Joins the WACS (1954)
  6. Francis in the Navy (1955)
  7. Francis in the Haunted House (1956)

== G ==
- Galaxy Express 999 * (A)
  1. Galaxy Express 999 (film) (1979)
  2. Ginga tetsudô Three-Nine: Garasu no Kurea (1980)
  3. Ginga tetsudô Three-Nine: Kimi wa haha no yô ni aiseru ka!! (1980) (TV)
  4. Sayônara, ginga tetsudô Surî-Nain: Andromeda shûchakueki (1981)
  5. Ginga tetsudô Three-Nine: Eien no tabibito Emeraldas (1980) (TV)
  6. Ginga tetsudô Three-Nine: Eternal Fantasy (1998)
  7. Ginga tetsudô Three-Nine: Fumetsu no kûkan kidô (2000)
- Gidget **
  1. Gidget (1959)
  2. Gidget Goes Hawaiian (1961)
  3. Gidget Goes to Rome (1963)
  4. Gidget Grows Up (1969) (TV)
  5. Gidget Gets Married (1972) (TV)
  6. Gidget Makes the Wrong Connection (1972) (TV)
  7. Gidget's Summer Reunion (1985) (TV)
- Guinea Pig
  1. Guinea Pig: Devil's Experiment (1985)(a.k.a. Guinea Pig: Unabridged Agony)
  2. Guinea Pig 2: Flower of Flesh and Blood (1985)
  3. Guinea Pig 3: He Never Dies (1986) (a.k.a. Guinea Pig 3: Shudder! The Man Who Doesn't Die)
  4. Guinea Pig 4: Mermaid in a Manhole (1988)
  5. Guinea Pig 5: Android of Notre Dame (1988)
  6. Guinea Pig 6: Devil Doctor Woman (1990)
  7. Guinea Pig 7: Slaughter Special (1991)

== H ==
- Highlander (a) ***
  1. Highlander (1986)
  2. Highlander II: The Quickening (1991)
  3. Highlander III: The Sorcerer (1994) (retcon)
  4. Highlander: Endgame (2000) (retcon)
  5. Highlander: The Search for Vengeance (2007) (A) (V)
  6. Highlander: The Source (2007) (TV) (retcon)
  7. Highlander (TBA) (reboot)
- Hildegarde Withers
  1. The Penguin Pool Murder (1932)
  2. Murder on the Blackboard (1934)
  3. Murder on a Honeymoon (1935)
  4. Murder on a Bridle Path (1936)
  5. The Plot Thickens (1936)
  6. Forty Naughty Girls (1937)
  7. A Very Missing Person (1972) (TV)
- Hurricane Hutch
  1. Hurricane Hutch (1921) (Serial)
  2. Go Get 'Em Hutch (1922) (Serial)
  3. Hutch Stirs 'em Up (1923)
  4. Hurricane Hutch in Many Adventures (1924)
  5. Hutch of the U.S.A. (1924)
  6. Lightning Hutch (1926) (Serial)
  7. Hidden Aces (1927)

== I ==
- Ice Age (A)
  1. Ice Age (2002)
  2. Ice Age: The Meltdown (2006)
  3. Ice Age: Dawn of the Dinosaurs (2009)
  4. Ice Age: Continental Drift (2012)
  5. Ice Age: Collision Course (2016)
  6. The Ice Age Adventures of Buck Wild (2022) (spin-off)
  7. Ice Age: Boiling Point (2027)
- Iron Man (a)
  1. The Invincible Iron Man (2007) (A) (V)
  2. Iron Man (2008)
  3. Iron Man 2 (2010)
  4. Iron Man 3 (2013)
  5. Iron Man: Rise of Technovore (2013) (A) (V)
  6. Iron Man and Hulk: Heroes United (2013) (A) (V)
  7. Iron Man and Captain America: Heroes United (2014) (A) (V)

== J ==
- Jurassic Park **
  1. Jurassic Park (1993)
  2. The Lost World: Jurassic Park (1997)
  3. Jurassic Park III (2001)
  4. Jurassic World (2015)
  5. Jurassic World: Fallen Kingdom (2018)
  6. Jurassic World Dominion (2022)
  7. Jurassic World Rebirth (2025)
- Jackass
  1. Jackass: The Movie (2002)
  2. Jackass Number Two (2006)
  3. Jackass Presents: Mat Hoffman's Tribute to Evel Knievel (2008) (V) (spin-off)
  4. Jackass 3D (2010)
  5. Jackass Presents: Bad Grandpa (2013) (spin-off)
  6. Jackass Forever (2022)
  7. Jackass: Best and Last (2026)

== K ==
- Kickboxer
1. Kickboxer (1989)
2. Kickboxer 2 (1991) (V)
3. Kickboxer 3 (1992) (V)
4. Kickboxer 4 (1994) (V)
5. Redemption: Kickboxer 5 (1995) (V)
6. Kickboxer: Vengeance (2016) (V) (reboot)
7. Kickboxer: Retaliation (2018) (V) (reboot)
- Kommissar X
  1. Hunt for the Unknown (1965) (a.k.a. Kiss Kiss Kill Kill)
  2. Three Yellow Cats (1966) (a.k.a. Death is Nimble, Death is Quick)
  3. So Darling So Deadly (1966)
  4. Death Trip (1967)
  5. Three Blue Panthers (1968) (a.k.a. Kill Panther Kill)
  6. Three Golden Serpents (1968) (a.k.a. The Island of Lost Girls)
  7. FBI: Operation Pakistan (1971) (a.k.a. Tiger Gang)

== L ==
- The Lion King (A) **
  1. The Lion King (1994)
  2. The Lion King II: Simba's Pride (1998) (V)
  3. The Lion King 1½ (2004) (V) (spin-off)
  4. The Lion Guard: Return of the Roar (2015) (TV) (remake)
  5. The Lion King (2019) (remake)
  6. Black Is King (2020) (TV) (standalone film)
  7. Mufasa: The Lion King (2024) (remake)
- Les Tuche
  1. Les Tuche (2011)
  2. Les Tuche 2 (2016)
  3. Poveri ma ricchi (2016) (remake)
  4. Poveri ma ricchissimi (2017) (remake)
  5. Les Tuche 3 (2018)
  6. Les Tuche 4 (2021)
  7. God Save the Tuche (2025)
- Lassie *****
  1. Lassie Come Home (1943)
  2. Son of Lassie (1945)
  3. Courage of Lassie (1946)
  4. Hills of Home (1948)
  5. The Sun Comes Up (1949)
  6. Challenge to Lassie (1950)
  7. The Painted Hills (1951)
- Die Lümmel von der ersten Bank
  1. Zur Hölle mit den Paukern (1968)
  2. Zum Teufel mit der Penne (1968)
  3. Pepe, der Paukerschreck (1969)
  4. Hurra, die Schule brennt! (1969)
  5. We'll Take Care of the Teachers (1970)
  6. Morgen fällt die Schule aus (1971)
  7. Betragen ungenügend! (1972)
- Lum and Abner
  1. Dreaming Out Loud (1940)
  2. The Bashful Bachelor (1942)
  3. Two Weeks to Live (1943)
  4. So This Is Washington (1943)
  5. Goin' to Town (1944)
  6. Partners in Time (1946)
  7. Lum and Abner Abroad (1956)

== O ==
- Office Lady Journal
  1. Office Lady Journal: Scent of Female Cat (1972)
  2. Office Lady Journal: Affair of Female Cat (1972)
  3. Office Lady Journal: Poaching (1973)
  4. Office Lady Journal: Wet Bundle (1974)
  5. Office Lady Journal: Ruined Lust (1974)
  6. Office Lady Journal: Indecent Relations (1975)
  7. Erotic Diary of An Office Lady (1977)
- Oss 117 (original series)
  1. OSS 117 n'est pas mort (1956)
  2. OSS 117 se déchaîne (1963)
  3. Banco à Bangkok pour OSS 117 (1964)
  4. Furia à Bahia pour OSS 117 (1965)
  5. Atout coeur à Tokyo pour OSS 117 (1966)
  6. Pas de roses pour OSS 117 (1968)
  7. OSS 117 takes a vacation (1970)

== P ==
- Police Academy **
  1. Police Academy (1984)
  2. Police Academy 2: Their First Assignment (1985)
  3. Police Academy 3: Back in Training (1986)
  4. Police Academy 4: Citizens on Patrol (1987)
  5. Police Academy 5: Assignment Miami Beach (1988)
  6. Police Academy 6: City Under Siege (1989)
  7. Police Academy: Mission to Moscow (1994)
- Police Story
  1. Police Story (1985)
  2. Police Story 2 (1988)
  3. Supercop (1992)
  4. Supercop 2 (1993) (spin-off)
  5. First Strike (1996)
  6. New Police Story (2004) (reboot)
  7. Police Story 2013 (2013) (reboot)
- Pierino *
  1. Pierino contro tutti (1981)
  2. Pierino il fichissimo (1981)
  3. Che casino... con Pierino! (1982)
  4. Pierino la peste alla riscossa (1982)
  5. Pierino colpisce ancora (1982)
  6. Quella peste di Pierina (1982)
  7. Pierino torna a scuola (1990)

== R ==
- Rise of the Footsoldier
1. Rise of the Footsoldier (2007)
2. Rise of the Footsoldier Part II: Reign of the General (2015)
3. Rise of the Footsoldier: The Pat Tate Story (2017) (prequel)
4. Rise of the Footsoldier: The Spanish Heist (2019) (prequel)
5. Rise of the Footsoldier Origins (2021) (prequel)
6. Rise of the Footsoldier: Vengeance (2023)
7. Rise of the Footsoldier: Retribution (2026)
- Road to...
  1. Road to Singapore (1940)
  2. Road to Zanzibar (1941)
  3. Road to Morocco (1942)
  4. Road to Utopia (1946)
  5. Road to Rio (1947)
  6. Road to Bali (1952)
  7. The Road to Hong Kong (1962)

== S ==
- Silent Night, Deadly Night
  1. Silent Night, Deadly Night (1984)
  2. Silent Night, Deadly Night Part 2 (1987) (V)
  3. Silent Night, Deadly Night 3: Better Watch Out! (1989) (V)
  4. Silent Night, Deadly Night 4: Initiation (1990) (V)
  5. Silent Night, Deadly Night 5: The Toy Maker (1991) (V)
  6. Silent Night (2012) (V) (remake)
  7. Silent Night, Deadly Night (2025) (remake)
- Street Fighter (a) ***
1. Street Fighter II: The Animated Movie (1994) (A)
2. Street Fighter (1994)
3. Street Fighter Alpha: The Animation (2000) (A) (V)
4. Street Fighter Alpha: Generations (2005) (A) (V)
5. Street Fighter IV: The Ties That Bind (2009) (A) (V)
6. Street Fighter: The Legend of Chun-Li (2009) (spin-off)
7. Street Fighter (2026) (reboot)
- Scream *
1. Scream (1996)
2. Scream 2 (1997)
3. Scream 3 (2000)
4. Scream 4 (2011)
5. Scream (2022)
6. Scream VI (2023)
7. Scream 7 (2026)
- Shrek (A) *
1. Shrek (2001)
2. Shrek 2 (2004)
3. Shrek the Third (2007)
4. Shrek Forever After (2010)
5. Puss in Boots (2011) (spin-off)
6. Puss in Boots: The Last Wish (2022) (spin-off)
7. Shrek 5 (2027)
- Samad
1. Samad va ghalicheyeh hazrat soleyman (1971)
2. Samad va fulad zereh div (1971)
3. Samad va sami, leila va leili (1972)
4. Samad be madreseh miravad (1973)
5. Samad Artist Mishavad (1974)
6. Samad khoshbakht mishavad (1975)
7. Samad dar rah ejdeha (1977)
- The Seven Deadly Sins
1. Envy (1917)
2. Pride (1917)
3. Greed (1917)
4. Sloth (1917)
5. Passion (1917)
6. Wrath (1917)
7. The Seventh Sin (1917)
- Smokey and the Bandit
1. Smokey and the Bandit (1977)
2. Smokey and the Bandit II (1980)
3. Smokey and the Bandit Part 3 (1983)
4. Bandit Goes Country (1994) (TV)
5. Bandit Bandit (1994) (TV)
6. Beauty and the Bandit (1994) (TV)
7. Bandit's Silver Angel (1994) (TV)
- St Trinian's School
1. The Belles of St Trinian's (1954)
2. Blue Murder at St Trinian's (1957)
3. The Pure Hell of St Trinian's (1958)
4. The Great St Trinian's Train Robbery (1966)
5. The Wildcats of St Trinian's (1980)
6. St Trinian's (2007)
7. St Trinian's: The Legend of Fritton's Gold (2009)

== T ==
- The Teen Agers
1. Junior Prom (1946)
2. Freddie Steps Out (1946)
3. High School Hero (1946)
4. Vacation Days (1947)
5. Sarge Goes to College (1947)
6. Smart Politics (1948)
7. Campus Sleuth (1948)
- Tremors *
1. Tremors (1990)
2. Tremors 2: Aftershocks (1996) (V)
3. Tremors 3: Back to Perfection (2001) (V)
4. Tremors 4: The Legend Begins (2004) (V) (prequel)
5. Tremors 5: Bloodlines (2015) (V)
6. Tremors: A Cold Day in Hell (2018) (V)
7. Tremors: Shrieker Island (2020) (V)
- Toy Story (A) *
1. Toy Story (1995)
2. Toy Story 2 (1999)
3. Buzz Lightyear of Star Command: The Adventure Begins (2000) (V) (spin-off)
4. Toy Story 3 (2010)
5. Toy Story 4 (2019)
6. Lightyear (2022) (spin-off)
7. Toy Story 5 (2026)

== W ==
- Walking Tall *
  1. Walking Tall (1973)
  2. Walking Tall Part 2 (1975)
  3. Walking Tall: Final Chapter (1977)
  4. A Real American Hero (1978) (TV) (remake)
  5. Walking Tall (2004) (remake)
  6. Walking Tall: The Payback (2007) (V) (remake)
  7. Walking Tall: Lone Justice (2007) (V) (remake)
- Wrong Turn
  1. Wrong Turn (2003)
  2. Wrong Turn 2: Dead End (2007) (V)
  3. Wrong Turn 3: Left for Dead (2009) (V)
  4. Wrong Turn 4: Bloody Beginnings (2011) (V) (prequel)
  5. Wrong Turn 5: Bloodlines (2012) (V) (prequel)
  6. Wrong Turn 6: Last Resort (2014) (V) (reboot)
  7. Wrong Turn (2021) (reboot)
- White Fang (1973 series)
1. White Fang (Italian: Zanna Bianca) (1973)
2. The Sons of White Fang (Italian: I figli di Zanna Bianca) (1974)
3. Challenge to White Fang (Italian: Il ritorno di Zanna Bianca) (1974)
4. White Fang to the Rescue (Italian: Zanna Bianca alla riscossa) (1974)
5. White Fang and the Gold Diggers (Italian: La spacconata) (1974)
6. White Fang and the Hunter (Italian: Zanna Bianca e il cacciatore solitario) (1975)
7. White Fang and the Magnificent Kid (Italian: Zanna Bianca e il grande Kid) (1977)

== Z ==
- Zoom Up
1. Zoom Up: Rape Site (1979)
2. Zoom In: Rape Apartments (1980)
3. Zoom Up: Woman from the Dirty Magazine (1980)
4. Zoom Up: Sexual Crime Report (1981)
5. Zoom Up: Genuine Look at a Stripper (1982)
6. Zoom Up: Graduation Photos (1984)
7. Zoom Up: Special Masturbation (1986)
