= Edythe Elliott =

American actress (1886–1978)

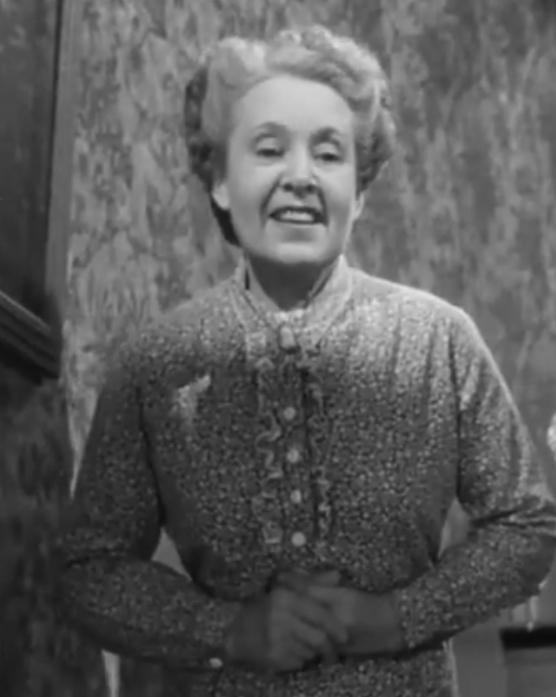
- Elliott in That Brennan Girl (1947)
- Born: Edythe Humburg; July 14, 1886; San Francisco, California, U.S.
- Died: April 9, 1978 (aged 91); San Diego, California, U.S.
- Occupation: Actress
- Spouse: Charles "Royal" Elliott

Edythe Elliott (born Edythe Humburg; July 14, 1886 – April 9, 1978) was an American character actress active primarily during the 1930s, 1940s, and 1950s.

== Biography ==
Edythe Elliott was born in San Francisco, California where her parents were involved in Vaudeville.

In 1917, Elliott became the leading lady of the stock company at the Wigwam Theatre in San Francisco. On Broadway, she portrayed Pansy Horner in Salt Water (1929), Florence Blandy in After Tomorrow (1931), and Mrs. Thomas Carter in Mother Lode (1934). She developed a prominent career on the stage before moving to the screen. She married fellow actor Charles "Royal" Elliott in Oregon in 1906 in a ceremony performed before a large audience.

Elliott debuted in films in 1935.

== Selected filmography ==
- Show Them No Mercy! (1935) - Mrs. Hansen
- I Married a Doctor (1936) - Mrs. Clark
- The Girl on the Front Page (1936) - Mrs. Stokes (uncredited)
- Stella Dallas (1937) - Department Store Clerk (uncredited)
- Crashing Hollywood (1938) - Barbara's Landlady (uncredited)
- Double Danger (1938) - Mrs. Edith Theron
- Condemned Women (1938) - Dr. Barnes (uncredited)
- Fixer Dugan (1939) - Mrs. Fletcher
- The Rookie Cop (1939) - Mrs. Maitland (uncredited)
- Bachelor Mother (1939) - Minor Role (uncredited)
- Dancing Co-Ed (1939) - Housemother Listening to Beethoven (uncredited)
- Beware Spooks! (1939) - Woman Radio Announcer (uncredited)
- Gone with the Wind (1939) - General's Wife (uncredited)
- Nobody's Children (1940) - Mrs. King (uncredited)
- Blondie in Society (1941) - Angry Neighbor Who Had a Birthday Cake (uncredited)
- The Medico of Painted Springs (1941) - Maw Blaine
- The Richest Man in Town (1941) - Elderly Woman (uncredited)
- The Iron Claw (1941, Serial) - Milly Leach
- Father Takes a Wife (1941) - Mrs. Plant, at Wedding (uncredited)
- Harmon of Michigan (1941) - Mrs. Davis (uncredited)
- The Stork Pays Off (1941) - Mrs. Gadsby (uncredited)
- The Power of God (1942) - Mrs. Gilder
- The Man Who Returned to Life (1942) - Mrs. Turner (uncredited)
- Bullets for Bandits (1942) - Queen Katey
- Flight Lieutenant (1942) - Mrs. Edythe Rhodes (uncredited)
- Blondie for Victory (1942) - Housewife of America (uncredited)
- Stand By All Networks (1942) - Mrs. Elliott (uncredited)
- Valley of Hunted Men (1942) - Elisabeth Schiller
- Lucky Jordan (1942) - 2nd Secretary (uncredited)
- Junior Army (1942) - Mrs. Pamela Ferguson (uncredited)
- Redhead from Manhattan (1943) - Nurse (uncredited)
- The Seventh Victim (1943) - Mrs. Swift (uncredited)
- Gangway for Tomorrow (1943) - Mary's Mother (uncredited)
- The Song of Bernadette (1943) - Townswoman (uncredited)
- Cowboy Canteen (1944) - Mrs. Bradley (uncredited)
- Casanova in Burlesque (1944) - Audience Member (uncredited)
- Stars on Parade (1944) - Mrs. Dean
- One Mysterious Night (1944) - Mother (uncredited)
- End of the Road (1944) - Middle-Aged Woman (uncredited)
- The Great Mike (1944) - Mrs. Dolan
- Let's Go Steady (1945) - Mrs. Pugg (uncredited)
- A Tree Grows in Brooklyn (1945) - Nurse (uncredited)
- The Power of the Whistler (1945) - Mrs. Crawford (uncredited)
- The Phantom of 42nd Street (1945) - Janis Buchanan
- Scotland Yard Investigator (1945) - Mrs. Brent (uncredited)
- Girls of the Big House (1945) - Postmistress (uncredited)
- Dick Tracy (1945) - Mrs. Caraway (uncredited)
- Life with Blondie (1945) - Minor Role (uncredited)
- The Madonna's Secret (1946) - Landlady (uncredited)
- The Undercover Woman (1946) - Mrs. Grey
- Freddie Steps Out (1946) - Mrs. Rogers
- Personality Kid (1946) - Mrs. Howard
- High School Hero (1946) - Mrs. Rogers
- Santa Fe Uprising (1946) - Mrs. Dibble
- Ginger (1946) - Mom Sullivan
- That Brennan Girl (1946) - Miss Unity, Jane's Sister
- Vacation Days (1947) - Mrs. Rogers
- Homesteaders of Paradise Valley (1947) - Mrs. Hume
- Web of Danger (1947) - Mrs. Mason - Red Cross Worker (uncredited)
- The Son of Rusty (1947) - Mrs. Hebble (uncredited)
- Messenger of Peace (1947) - Hilda Torgel
- The Fabulous Texan (1947) - Texas Woman (uncredited)
- Her Husband's Affairs (1947) - Nurse (uncredited)
- The Bishop's Wife (1947) - Saleslady (uncredited)
- The Lady from Shanghai (1947) - Old Lady (uncredited)
- House by the River (1950) - Minor Role (uncredited)
- Kill the Umpire (1950) - Elderly Woman (uncredited)
- The Killer That Stalked New York (1950) - Nurse (uncredited)
- Hit Parade of 1951 (1950) - Minor Role (uncredited)
- Belle Le Grand (1951) - Miner's Wife (uncredited)
- All That I Have (1951) - Juror Mrs. Burton (uncredited)
- Rose of Cimarron (1952) - Townswoman (uncredited)
- Rainbow 'Round My Shoulder (1952) - Mrs. Gilmore (uncredited)
