= Barefoot Boy (disambiguation) =

Barefoot Boy may refer to:

- Barefoot Boy, album by Larry Coryell
- The Barefoot Boy (film), a 1923 American silent film
- Barefoot Boy (film), a 1938 children's adventure film
- "The Barefoot Boy", 1855 poem written by American Quaker poet John Greenleaf Whittier
