= Jackie Moran =

American actor (1923–1990)

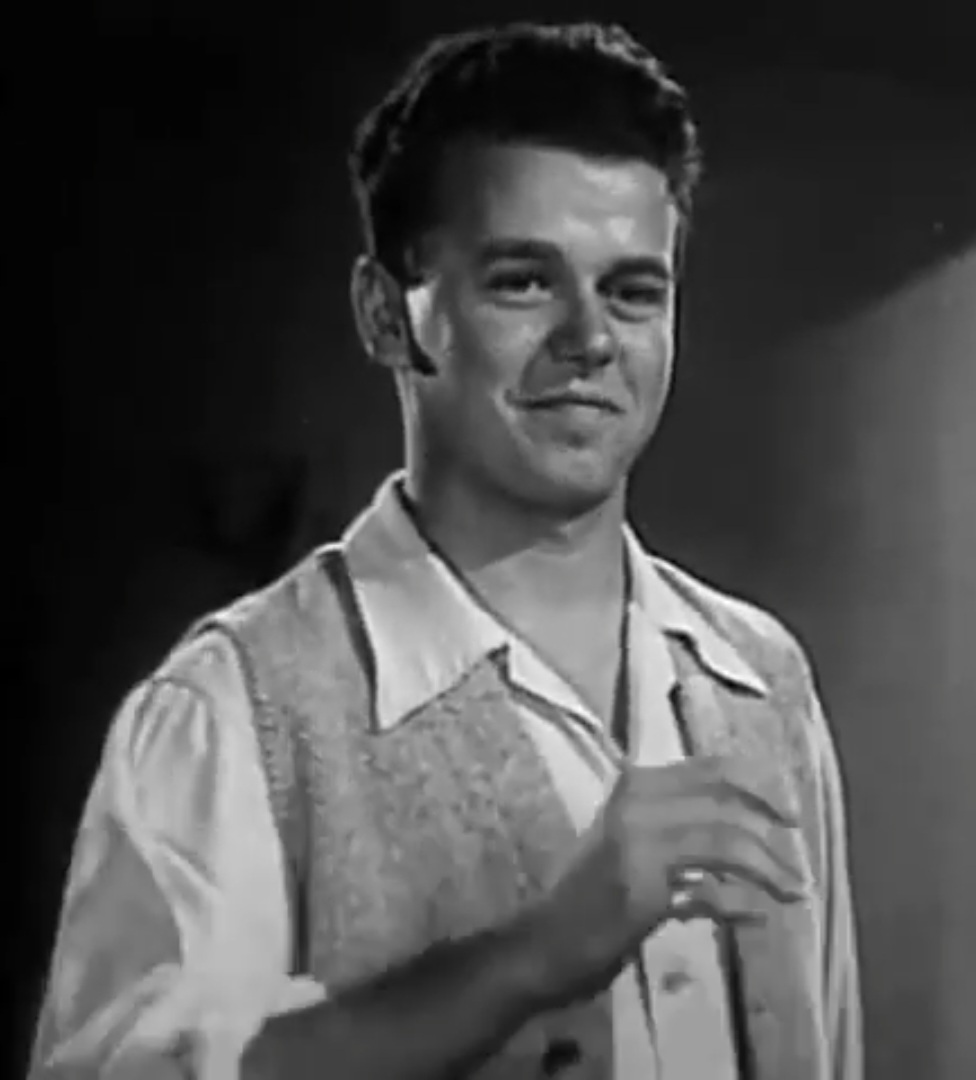
- Moran in Let's Go Collegiate (1941)
- Born: John E. Moran; January 26, 1923; Mattoon, Illinois, U.S.
- Died: September 20, 1990 (aged 67); Greenfield, Massachusetts, U.S.
- Occupation: Actor
- Years active: 1936–1946

John E. Moran (January 26, 1923 – September 20, 1990) was an American movie actor who, from 1936 to 1946, appeared in over 30 films, primarily in teenage roles.

== Early life and Hollywood career ==
A native of Mattoon, Illinois, Moran first sang in a church choir. He was discovered by Mary Pickford who convinced his mother, a concert singer and father, an attorney, to take him to Hollywood for a screen test in 1935. Billed as Jackie Moran, he was subsequently cast in a number of substantial supporting roles. He became known with the 1938 release of David O. Selznick's production The Adventures of Tom Sawyer. The 93-minute big-budget Technicolor film presented Moran as Huckleberry Finn to Tommy Kelly's Tom Sawyer. Jackie Moran received critical praise for his natural acting style.

Jackie Moran went on to star in several youth-oriented films for low-budget and poverty-row studios, such as Republic and Monogram. His most frequent co-star was the one-year-younger Marcia Mae Jones, who appeared with him in 11 films, also including Tom Sawyer, where Jones had the relatively minor part of Tom Sawyer's cousin Mary. They also played supporting roles in the Deanna Durbin vehicle Mad About Music. They played in four Monogram tributes to life in idealized pre-World War II rural America, 1938's Barefoot Boy, and in 1940, Tomboy, Haunted House and The Old Swimmin' Hole. The trio of 1940 films were directed by Robert F. McGowan, the former director of Our Gang. Most of Jackie and Marcia Mae's remaining five films cast them in major supporting roles. Their final entry, after a two-year break, was the 1943 Republic musical Nobody's Darling, one of the early films helmed by Anthony Mann.

Moran appeared in a cameo in Gone with the Wind (1939), where he played the son of Dr. Meade, furious about his brother's death as a soldier, and wanting to join the Confederate Army so he can "kill all those Yankees." Jackie had a co-starring role with Buster Crabbe in Universal's 12-chapter serial Buck Rogers in which he was third-billed as Buck's young friend, Buddy Wade. Jackie's next 1939 release was the Hardy Family-like Everybody's Hobby, while the last, Spirit of Culver, a remake of 1932's military-school film Tom Brown of Culver, teamed him with two former top child stars Jackie Cooper and Freddie Bartholomew. Jackie Moran did not serve in the military during the war and continued to act in movies, including one final appearance in Selznick's Since You Went Away (1944), where he played a grocer's son who exchanges bashful glances with Shirley Temple.

Moran ended his screen career in 1945–1946 with a collection of teenage musical comedies at Columbia and Monogram. He was the title character in Monogram's comedy-mystery There Goes Kelly, and co-starred with actress June Preisser in Columbia's Let's Go Steady and Monogram's Junior Prom, Freddie Steps Out and High School Hero. The latter three were part of a series which also featured Freddie Stewart, Warren Mills, Frankie Darro and Noel Neill. Jackie Moran's final movie role was in Columbia's college drama Betty Co-Ed.

== Later life ==
In 1948, according to his ex-wife Mary Grace McManmon (1921 to 2017), Jack was in jail for allegedly stealing a car, driving it from Los Angeles to Chicago. While in jail he became ill and was hospitalized at the Merchant Marine Hospital in Chicago, Mary was his attending nurse. They married in 1949. After they married, and as stated in his obituary, he worked in public relations as a writer for the Roman Catholic Diocese of Chicago. In 1953, they moved to Culver City, California for Jack to pursue a career in screenwriting. According to anecdotal information from Mary G. Moran, that in spite of Jack "pitching" numerous screenplays to Hollywood producers during the 1950s, or find employment that was satisfactory to him, he was mostly unsuccessful and remained unemployed.

Moran did sell some screenplays to sexploitation filmmaker Russ Meyer, notably for the films Faster, Pussycat! Kill! Kill!, Good Morning and... Goodbye!, Wild Gals of the Naked West, and Common Law Cabin in which, as "Jack Moran," he also stars at the top-billed actor. It was also written that he wrote songs. Due to excessive gambling at the race track and alcoholism, Jack and Mary divorced in 1971.

Moran moved to Greenfield, Massachusetts in 1984 and wrote the novel Six Step House. Six years after his arrival, he died of cancer at Franklin Medical Center at the age of 67. As requested in his will, Jackie Moran's ashes were scattered on the backstretch of the Del Mar Racetrack, a horse-racing facility in Del Mar, California.

== Filmography ==
- And So They Were Married (1936) - Tommy Blake
- Counterfeit (1936) - Duckfoot (uncredited)
- Valiant Is the Word for Carrie (1936) - Paul Darnley (as a Child)
- Outcast (1937) - Freddie Simmerson
- Michael O'Halloran (1937) - Michael O'Halloran
- The Adventures of Tom Sawyer (1938) - Huckleberry Finn
- Mad About Music (1938) - Tommy
- Arson Gang Busters (1938) - Jimmy Riler
- Mother Carey's Chickens (1938) - Gilbert Carey
- Barefoot Boy (1938) - Billy Whittaker
- The Spirit of Culver (1939) - Perkins
- Buck Rogers (1939) - George 'Buddy' Wade
- Everybody's Hobby (1939) - Robert Leslie
- Meet Dr. Christian (1939) - Don Hewitt
- Gone with the Wind (1939) - Phil Meade
- Tomboy (1940) - Steve
- Anne of Windy Poplars (1940) - Boy
- Haunted House (1940) - Jimmie Atkins
- The Old Swimmin' Hole (1940) - Chris Carter
- The Gang's All Here (1941) - Chick Daly
- Let's Go Collegiate (1941) - Tad
- Nobody's Darling (1943) - Charles Grant Jr.
- Henry Aldrich Haunts a House (1943) - Whit Bidecker
- Andy Hardy's Blonde Trouble (1944) - Spud (uncredited)
- Since You Went Away (1944) - Johnny Mahoney
- Song of the Open Road (1944) - Jack Moran
- Janie (1944) - Mickey - a Sailor
- Three Little Sisters (1944) - Chad Jones
- Let's Go Steady (1945) - Roy Spencer
- There Goes Kelly (1945) - Jimmy Kelly
- Hop Harrigan America's Ace of the Airways (1946) - Fraser
- Junior Prom (1946) - Jimmy Forrest
- Freddie Steps Out (1946) - Jimmy Forrest
- High School Hero (1946) - Jimmy Forrest
- Betty Co-Ed (1946) - Ted Harris
- Wild Gals of the Naked West (1962)
- Dingle, Dangle (1966)
- Common Law Cabin (1967) - Dewey Hoople
- Code Name: Raw-Hide (1972) - The Chief (final film role)
