= Belle Mitchell =

American actress

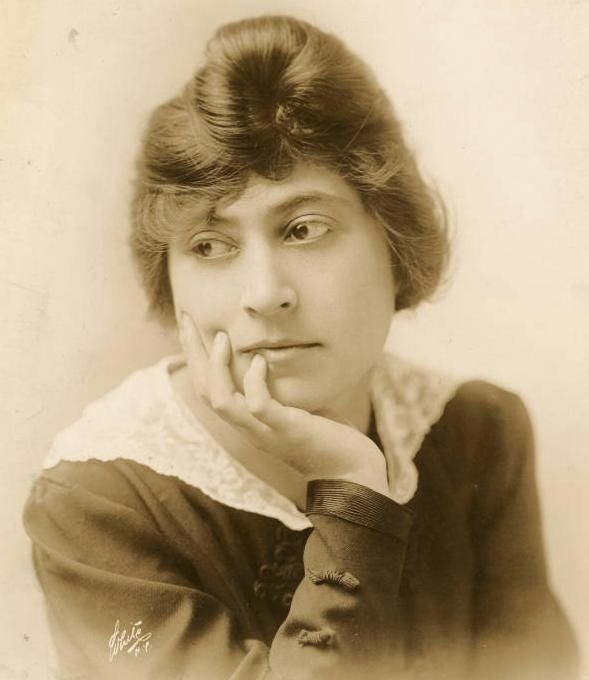
- Belle Mitchell in 1915
- Born: September 24, 1889; Croswell, Michigan, U.S.
- Died: February 12, 1979 (aged 89); Woodland Hills, Los Angeles, U.S.
- Years active: 1915-1978

Belle Mitchell (September 24, 1889 – February 12, 1979) was an American stage and film actress.

== Early life ==
Mitchell was born in Croswell, Michigan

== Career ==
Mitchell appeared in more than 100 films between 1915 and 1978.

== Death ==
Mitchell died in Woodland Hills, Los Angeles.

== Partial filmography ==
(NOTE: In the IMDb list, it states that she appeared in some Harold Lloyd and Stan Laurel (solo) films, but this information is incorrect as another actress with the same name actually appeared in those films.)

- His Regeneration (1915, Short) - The Saloon Girl (uncredited)
- Flying Romeos (1928) - Mrs. Goldberg
- Symphony of Six Million (1932) - Guest at Redemption Ceremony (uncredited)
- I Love That Man (1933) - Maria - Angelo's Wife
- Viva Villa! (1934) - Spanish Wife (uncredited)
- Stamboul Quest (1934) - Hotel Maid (uncredited)
- Rendezvous (1935) - Mexican (uncredited)
- The Leavenworth Case (1936) - The Cat Woman
- San Francisco (1936) - Louise - Mary's Maid (uncredited)
- Piccadilly Jim (1936) - (uncredited)
- Man of the People (1937) - Italian Woman (uncredited)
- Maytime (1937) - Mary (uncredited)
- The Firefly (1937) - Lola
- Madame X (1937) - Nun (uncredited)
- Blockade (1938) - Suicidal Townswoman (uncredited)
- Prison Break (1938) - Party Woman (uncredited)
- Angels with Dirty Faces (1938) - Mrs. Maggione (uncredited)
- Lady of the Tropics (1939) - Delaroch's Dinner Guest (uncredited)
- The Great Commandment (1939) - Jemuel's Wife (uncredited)
- Road to Singapore (1940) - Native Shopkeeper (uncredited)
- The Mark of Zorro (1940) - Maria
- A Night at Earl Carroll's (1940) - Woman (uncredited)
- South of Tahiti (1941) - Taupa (uncredited)
- Saboteur (1942) - Adele - Tobin's Maid (uncredited)
- Halfway to Shanghai (1942) - Yna (uncredited)
- The Leopard Man (1943) - Señora Calderon (uncredited)
- Phantom of the Opera (1943) - Feretti's Maid (uncredited)
- The Spider Woman (1943) - Fortune Teller (uncredited)
- The Song of Bernadette (1943) - Townswoman (uncredited)
- Ali Baba and the Forty Thieves (1944) - Nursemaid (uncredited)
- Cobra Woman (1944) - Native Woman (uncredited)
- Ghost Catchers (1944) - Mrs. Signatelli (uncredited)
- The Desert Hawk (1944) - (uncredited)
- Meet Me in St. Louis (1944) - Mrs. Braukoff (uncredited)
- House of Frankenstein (1944) - Urla - Gypsy Woman (uncredited)
- Sudan (1945) - Woman (uncredited)
- That Night with You (1945) - Mother with Apple (uncredited)
- Cornered (1945) - Hotel Maid (uncredited)
- Who's Guilty? (1945) - Sara Caldwell
- The Fighting Guardsman (1946) - Peasant Woman (uncredited)
- Junior Prom (1946) - Miss Hinklefink
- Freddie Steps Out (1946) - Miss Hinklefink
- High School Hero (1946) - Miss Hinklefink
- Son of the Guardsman (1946) - Dame Duncan (uncredited)
- The Beast with Five Fingers (1946) - Giovanna
- Vacation Days (1947) - Miss Hinklefink
- Unconquered (1947) - Squaw (uncredited)
- Desire Me (1947) - Baker's Wife (uncredited)
- The Prince of Thieves (1948) - Margaret Head (uncredited)
- Sword of the Avenger (1948) - Aunt
- The Vicious Circle (1948) - Mrs. Juliana Horney
- That Lady in Ermine (1948) - Ancestor (uncredited)
- The Snake Pit (1948) - Inmate (uncredited)
- Prejudice (1949) - Eddie's Mother (uncredited)
- Ghost Chasers (1951) - Madame Zola (uncredited)
- Mask of the Avenger (1951) - Busybody (uncredited)
- Thief of Damascus (1952) - Old Woman (uncredited)
- The Miracle of Our Lady of Fatima (1952) - Señora Carreira (uncredited)
- Hiawatha (1952) - Mother (uncredited)
- Scared Stiff (1953) - Zombie's Mother (uncredited)
- Tumbleweed (1953) - Tigre's Mother (uncredited)
- Phantom of the Rue Morgue (1954) - Concierge (uncredited)
- Passion (1954) - Señora Carrisa (uncredited)
- Strange Lady in Town (1955) - Catalina (uncredited)
- Hell on Frisco Bay (1955) - Sanchina Fiaschetti (uncredited)
- The First Traveling Saleslady (1956) - Emily (uncredited)
- Lust for Life (1956) - Mme. Tanguy (uncredited)
- The Book of Acts Series (1957) - Hostess
- The Return of Dracula (1958) - Cornelia (uncredited)
- The Lone Ranger and the Lost City of Gold (1958) - Caulama
- The Power of the Resurrection (1958) - Woman (uncredited)
- The Miracle (1959) - Farmer's Wife (uncredited)
- A Majority of One (1961) - Neighbor (uncredited)
- Get Yourself a College Girl (1964) - Mrs. Culverson - Faculty Member (uncredited)
- When the Boys Meet the Girls (1965) - Laughing Woman in Audience (uncredited)
- The War Lord (1965) - Old Woman
- Funny Girl (1968) - Woman on Henry Street (uncredited)
- Airport (1970) - Bertha Kaplan - Passenger (uncredited)
- High Plains Drifter (1973) - Mrs. Lake
- Soylent Green (1973) - Book #3
- Crazed (1978) - Mrs. Brewer
