= The Teen Agers =

1946-48 musical films

The Teen Agers is a series of seven coming-of-age musical comedy-drama films made by Monogram Pictures from 1946 to 1948. A follow-up to the East Side Kids, the series stars Freddie Stewart and June Preisser.

The films were initially produced by Sam Katzman but when he left Monogram for Columbia Pictures, duties shifted to Will Jason. The first four films are directed by Arthur Dreifuss, with the remaining three by Jason.

== Filmography ==
- Junior Prom (1946)
- Freddie Steps Out (1946)
- High School Hero (1946)
- Vacation Days (1947)
- Sarge Goes to College (1947)
- Smart Politics (1948)
- Campus Sleuth (1948)

== Legacy ==
Junior Prom, Freddie Steps Out, Vacation Days, and High School Hero have been given comedic commentaries by Bridget Jones Nelson and Mary Jo Pehl as part of RiffTrax.
