= I'll Tell the World =

I'll Tell the World may refer to:

- I'll Tell the World (1934 film), an American pre-Code comedy film
- I'll Tell the World (1945 film), an American comedy film
