= Gallant Sons =

- Theatrical release poster
- Directed by: George B. Seitz
- Screenplay by: William R. Lipman; Marion Parsonnet
- Produced by: Frederick Stephani
- Starring: Jackie Cooper; Bonita Granville; Gail Patrick; Gene Reynolds; June Preisser; Ian Hunter; Leo Gorcey; William Tracy; El Brendel
- Cinematography: Sidney Wagner
- Edited by: Ben Lewis
- Music by: David Snell
- Production company: Metro-Goldwyn-Mayer
- Distributed by: Loew's Inc.
- Release date: November 15, 1940
- Running time: 76 minutes
- Country: United States
- Language: English

Gallant Sons is a 1940 American mystery film directed by George B. Seitz and written by William R. Lipman and Marion Parsonnet. The film stars Jackie Cooper, Bonita Granville, Gail Patrick, Gene Reynolds, June Preisser, Ian Hunter, Leo Gorcey, William Tracy and El Brendel. The film was released on November 15, 1940, by Metro-Goldwyn-Mayer.

== Plot ==
Two boys, Johnny Davis and Byron "By" Newbold, are best friends. Their fathers, however, are not. By’s father is in charge of the local paper and usually confronts Johnny’s father about suspicious activity putting the boys at odds with one another.

== Cast ==
- Jackie Cooper as Byron 'By' Newbold
- Bonita Granville as Kate Pendleton
- Gail Patrick as Clare Pendleton
- Gene Reynolds as Johnny Davis
- June Preisser as Dolly Matson
- Ian Hunter as 'Natural' Davis
- Leo Gorcey as 'Doc' Reardon
- William Tracy as 'Beefy' Monrose
- El Brendel as Olaf Larsen
- Tommy Kelly as Harwood 'Woody' Hollister
- Edward Ashley-Cooper as Al Posna
- Minor Watson as Barton Newbold
- Ferike Boros as Madame Wachek
- Charlotte Wynters as Estelle
- Don Douglas as Hackberry
- George Lessey as Judge
