= Tahiti Nights =

1944 film

- Directed by: Will Jason
- Screenplay by: Lillie Hayward
- Produced by: Sam White
- Starring: Jinx Falkenburg; Dave O'Brien; Mary Treen; Florence Bates; Cy Kendall; Eddie Bruce
- Cinematography: Benjamin H. Kline
- Edited by: Jerome Thoms
- Music by: Mischa Bakaleinikoff
- Production company: Columbia Pictures
- Distributed by: Columbia Pictures
- Release date: December 28, 1944
- Running time: 63 minutes
- Country: United States
- Language: English

Tahiti Nights is a 1944 American comedy film directed by Will Jason and written by Lillie Hayward. The film stars Jinx Falkenburg, Dave O'Brien, Mary Treen, Florence Bates, Cy Kendall and Eddie Bruce. The film was released on December 28, 1944, by Columbia Pictures.

== Cast ==
- Jinx Falkenburg as Luana
- Dave O'Brien as Jack
- Mary Treen as Mata
- Florence Bates as Queen Liliha
- Cy Kendall as Chief Enoka
- Eddie Bruce as Chopstick / Cyril Stonewall
- The Vagabonds as Comic Musicians
- Hilo Hattie as Temata
- Pedro de Cordoba as Tonga
- Carole Mathews as Betty Lou
- Harry Owens as Harry Owens
