= Barefoot Boy (film) =

1938 film by Karl Brown

- Original film poster
- Directed by: Karl Brown
- Written by: John T. Neville (story and screenplay)
- Produced by: E.B. Derr (producer); Frank Melford (associate producer)
- Cinematography: Gilbert Warrenton
- Edited by: Finn Ulback
- Distributed by: Monogram Pictures
- Release date: August 3, 1938
- Running time: 63 minutes
- Country: United States
- Language: English

Barefoot Boy is a 1938 American children's adventure film, directed by Karl Brown, and "suggested" by the poem of the same name by American writer John Greenleaf Whittier. Text from the original poem is recited after the titles.

== Plot ==
Kenneth Hale, a pampered, snobbish young boy is sent by his father, John Hale, who has served time in prison for a crime he did not commit, down to the country farm of an old friend, Calvin Whittaker. The barefooted, honest and plucky Billy Whittaker, his girlfriend Julia Blaine, her older sister Pige, and punky Kenneth get involved with a "haunted" house and a gang of crooks, while Billy helps make a "better man" out of Kenneth.

== Cast ==
- Jackie Moran as Billy Whittaker
- Marcia Mae Jones as Pige Blaine
- Bradley Metcalfe as Kenneth Hale
- Johnnie Morris as Jeff Blaine
- Marilyn Knowlden as Julia Blaine
- Terry as herself
- Ralph Morgan as John Hale
- Claire Windsor as Valerie Hale
- Helen MacKellar as Martha Whittaker
- Matty Fain as Blake
- Frank Puglia as Hank
- J. Farrell MacDonald as Warden
- Charles D. Brown as Calvin Whittaker
- Roger Gray as Dutch
- Earle Hodgins as Sheriff
- Henry Roquemore as Benjamin Blaine
- Hal Cooke as Parker
