= Betty Co-Ed =

1946 film

- Film poster
- Directed by: Arthur Dreifuss
- Written by: Arthur Dreifuss and George H. Plympton
- Produced by: Sam Katzman
- Starring: Jean Porter
- Cinematography: M. A. Anderson
- Edited by: Henry Batista
- Production company: Kay Pictures
- Distributed by: Columbia Pictures
- Release date: November 28, 1946
- Running time: 68 minutes
- Country: United States
- Language: English

Betty Co-Ed is a 1946 American musical comedy film starring Jean Porter, directed by Arthur Dreifuss and produced by Sam Katzman.

== Plot ==
Vaudeville is in Joanne Leeds's blood, but when she applies for admission at prestigious Upton College, she is accepted because it is mistakenly believed she hails from a prominent family.

A rivalry begins immediately with Upton student Gloria Campbell, who resents boyfriend Bill Brewster's interest in the new girl. Joanne is humiliated by Gloria during a college pledge party. Attending a school dance by herself, Joanne joins the singers on stage and impresses Bill and other students.

Deciding to run for the title of "Betty Co-Ed", most popular girl on campus, Joanne is crossed again by Gloria, who stuffs the ballot box to make it appear Joanne has rigged the vote. Faced with expulsion, Joanne delivers a speech that causes Gloria to develop a guilty conscience and apologize.

== Cast ==
- Jean Porter as Joanne Leeds
- Shirley Mills as Gloria Campbell
- Jackie Moran as Ted Harris
- William Mason as Bill Brewster

== Production ==
The film was based on a story by Erna Lazarus which Columbia Pictures bought in 1945. They assigned it to Sam Katzman, who made it for his production company, Kay Pictures, who released through Columbia. Porter was borrowed from MGM to play the lead. She wound up making a number of movies for Katzman.
