= Hi-Jacked =

1950 film

- Directed by: Sam Newfield
- Screenplay by: Orville Hampton; Fred Myton
- Story by: Fred Myton; Raymond L. Schrock (as Raymond Schrock)
- Produced by: Sigmund Neufeld
- Starring: Jim Davis; Marcia Mae Jones
- Cinematography: Philip Tannura (as Phil Tennura)
- Edited by: Edward Mann
- Music by: Paul Dunlap
- Production company: Sigmund Neufeld Productions
- Distributed by: Lippert Pictures
- Release date: July 7, 1950
- Running time: 66 minutes
- Country: United States
- Language: English

Hi-Jacked is a 1950 American crime film noir directed by Sam Newfield and starring Jim Davis and Marcia Mae Jones.

== Plot ==
A parolee working for a trucking line struggles to clear his name after being accused of involvement with hijackers.

== Cast ==
- Jim Davis as Joe Harper
- Marcia Mae Jones as Jean Harper (as Marsha Jones)
- Sid Melton as Killer
- Davis Bruce as Matt
- Paul Cavanagh as Hagen
- Ralph Sanford as Stephen Clark
- House Peters Jr. as Hank
- Iris Adrian as Aggie
- George Eldredge as Digbey
- William E. Green as Arthur Kent
- Margia Dean as Dolly, the Waitress
- Kit Guard as Parolee (as Kid Guard)
- Lee Phelps as Highway Patrolman
- Myron Healey as Police Broadcaster
- Lee Bennett as Charlie

== Reception ==
Critic Dorothy Masters of the New York Daily News wrote: "Jim Davis plays the lead, and does fairly well at it, considering the improbables."

Syndicated columnist Jimmie Fidler wrote: "Class B melodrama with lots of action, but a threadbare plot."
