= Martha Davis (singer) =

American singer (1917–1960)

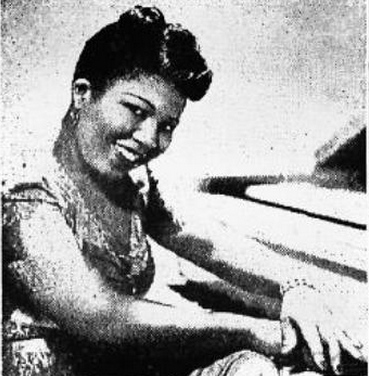

Background information
- Born: December 14, 1917; Wichita, Kansas, U.S.
- Died: April 6, 1960 (aged 42) New York, U.S.
- Genres: R&B
- Occupation: Singer
- Instruments: Piano; Vocals
- Labels: Jewel, ABC Paramount
- Formerly of: Martha Davis & Spouse

Martha Davis (December 14, 1917 – April 6, 1960) was an American singer whose musical comedy act "Martha Davis & Spouse" was popular in the late 1940s and 1950s.

== Career ==
Davis was born in Wichita, Kansas, and raised in Chicago, Illinois. By the mid-1930s, she had met and been influenced by Fats Waller, and performed regularly as a singer and pianist in Chicago clubs. In 1939, while married to her first husband, she first met bass player Calvin Ponder (October 17, 1917 - December 26, 1970), who went on to play in Earl Hines' band. The pair would marry in 1948.

In 1948, Davis and Ponder moved to California, and Davis developed her recording career on Jewel Records in Hollywood with a trio including Ponder, Ralph Williams (guitar) and Lee Young (drums). Their cover of Dick Haymes' pop hit "Little White Lies" reached # 11 on the Billboard R&B chart, followed by a duet with Louis Jordan, "Daddy-O" in 1948, which reached #7 on the R&B chart that year.

Davis and Ponder also began performing together on stage, developing a musical and comedy routine as "Martha Davis & Spouse" which played on their physical characteristics (she was large, he was smaller). The act became hugely popular, touring and having a residency at the Blue Angel in New York City. They appeared together in movies including Smart Politics (with Gene Krupa), and in the mid-1950s, variety films Rhythm & Blues Revue, Rock 'n' Roll Revue and Basin Street Revue. Several of their performances were filmed by Snader Telescriptions for video jukeboxes, and they also broadcast on network TV, particularly Garry Moore's CBS show.

In 1957, after a break of several years, they resumed recording for the ABC Paramount label, with whom they cut two LPs. Davis died from cancer in New York in 1960, aged 42, and Ponder died ten years later, aged 53.
