= Marcia Mae Jones =

American actress (1924–2007)

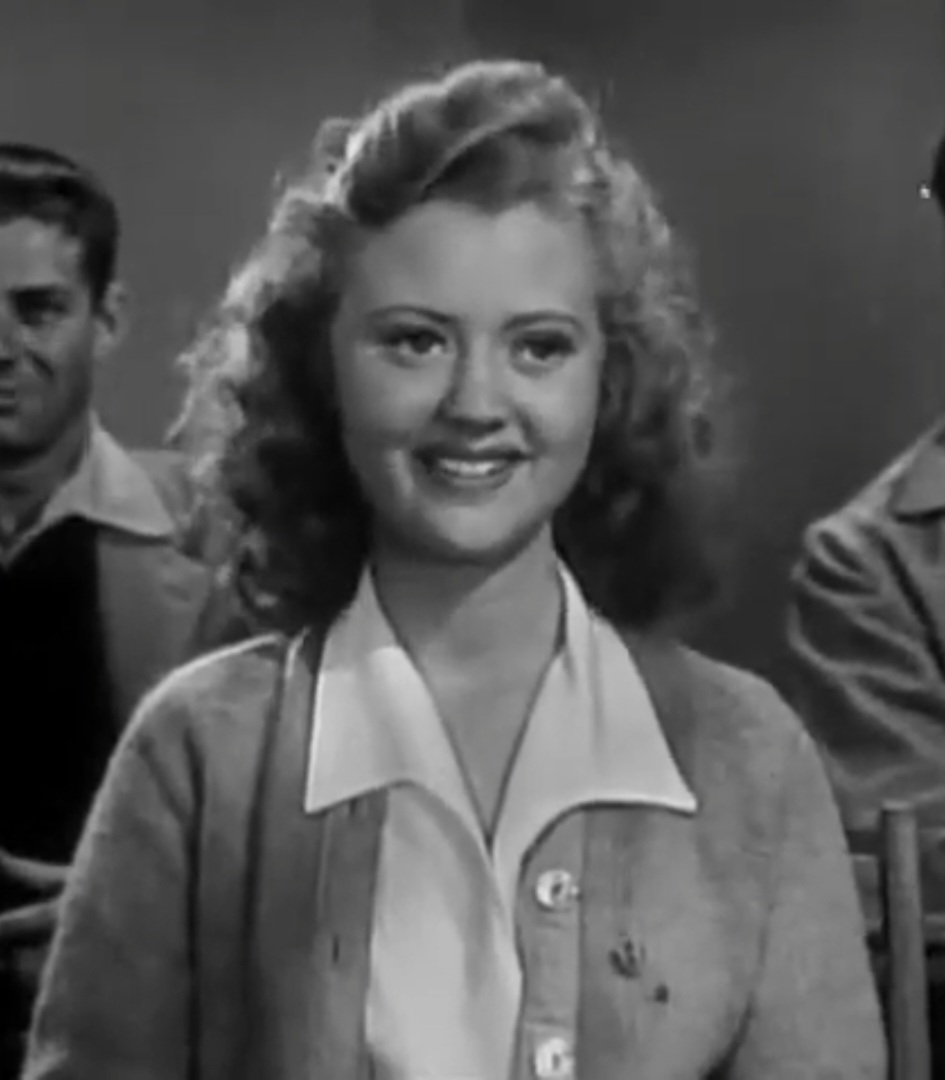
- Jones in Let's Go Collegiate (1941)
- Born: Marcia Mae Jones; August 1, 1924; Los Angeles, California, U.S.
- Died: September 2, 2007 (aged 83); Woodland Hills, Los Angeles, California. U.S.
- Occupation: Actress
- Years active: 1926–1983
- Spouses: Robert Chic (m. 1943; div. 1951); Bill Davenport (m. 1955; div. 1963)
- Children: 2

Marcia Mae Jones (August 1, 1924 – September 2, 2007) was an American film and television actress whose prolific career spanned 57 years.

== Early years ==
Jones was the youngest of four children born to actress Freda Jones. All three of her siblings, Margaret, Macon, and Marvin Jones, were also child actors. Their relationship was strained by their unequal status in the film world. "I constantly heard, 'You've got to be quiet; Marcia Mae has to learn her lines.' It was Marcia Mae this and Marcia Mae that. That's where the jealousy from my siblings came from. They blamed me for it, when it was my mother who was doing it."

== Career ==
Jones made her film debut at the age of two in the 1926 film Mannequin. She appeared in films such as King of Jazz (1930), Street Scene (1931), and Night Nurse (1931) before rising to child stardom in the 1930s with roles in The Champ (1931) and, alongside Shirley Temple in Heidi (1937) and The Little Princess (1939). She also starred in films such as The Garden of Allah (1936), These Three (1936), and The Adventures of Tom Sawyer (1938).

Jones blossomed into a wide-eyed, blonde, wholesome-looking teenager, and worked steadily in motion pictures through her late teens. She appeared in First Love (1939), in support of Deanna Durbin. In 1940, Monogram Pictures signed her to co-star with Jackie Moran in a few rustic romances; when this series lapsed, both Jones and Moran joined Monogram's popular action-comedy series starring Frankie Darro.

As a young adult, she continued to work in motion pictures, notably in Nine Girls (1944) and Arson, Inc. (1948). Like many familiar faces of the 1940s, she appeared on numerous television programs. In 1951 she appeared as comic foil to Buster Keaton in Keaton's filmed TV series. She went on to work in such top-rated shows as The Cisco Kid, The Adventures of Wild Bill Hickok, The George Burns and Gracie Allen Show, Peyton Place, and General Hospital. Her last major role was in the Barbra Streisand film The Way We Were in 1973.

== Personal life ==
Jones was married to Robert Chic and had two sons with him. Her second marriage was to television writer Bill Davenport.

== Death ==
On September 2, 2007, Jones died in Woodland Hills, California, of complications of pneumonia. She was 83.

== Partial filmography ==
- Mannequin (1926) - Joan Herrick as a baby (uncredited)
- Smile, Brother, Smile (1927)
- The Bishop Murder Case (1929) - Hungry Child in Park (uncredited)
- King of Jazz (1930) - Bridesmaid ('My Bridal Veil') (uncredited)
- Night Nurse (1931) - Nanny Ritchey (uncredited)
- Street Scene (1931) - Mary - Little Girl (uncredited)
- The Champ (1931) - Mary Lou Carleton
- What Price Hollywood? (1932) - Flower Girl at wedding (uncredited)
- Birthday Blues (1932, Short) - Girl with Whistle
- Employees' Entrance (1933) - Flower Girl at Wedding (uncredited)
- Mush and Milk (1933, Short) - Orphan (as Our Gang)
- Doctor Bull (1933) - Ruth - School Girl (uncredited)
- Imitation of Life (1934) - Peola's Frontrow Classmate (uncredited)
- The County Chairman (1935) - Schoolgirl (uncredited)
- A Dog of Flanders (1935) - Little Girl at Party (uncredited)
- This Is the Life (1935) - Girl at Picnic (uncredited)
- These Three (1936) - Rosalie
- Gentle Julia (1936) - Patty Fairchild (uncredited)
- The Garden of Allah (1936) - Convent Girl #1 (uncredited)
- Two Wise Maids (1937) - Geraldine 'Jerry ' Karns
- Mountain Justice (1937) - Bethie Harkins
- The Life of Emile Zola (1937) - Helen Richards
- Heidi (1937) - Klara Sesemann
- Lady Behave! (1937) - Patricia Cormack
- The Adventures of Tom Sawyer (1938) - Mary Sawyer
- Mad About Music (1938) - Olga
- Barefoot Boy (1938) - Pige Blaine
- The Little Princess (1939) - Lavinia
- The Flying Irishman (1939) - Teenager Posing For Photograph (uncredited)
- First Love (1939) - Marcia Parker
- Meet Dr. Christian (1939) - Marilee
- Tomboy (1940) - Pat Kelly
- Anne of Windy Poplars (1940) - Jen Pringle
- Haunted House (1940) - Mildred 'Millie' Henshaw
- The Old Swimmin' Hole (1940) - Betty Elliott
- Nice Girl? (1941) - Jane's Friend at Benefit
- The Gang's All Here (1941) - Patsy Wallace
- Let's Go Collegiate (1941) - Bess Martin
- Secrets of a Co-Ed (1942) - Laura Wright
- The Youngest Profession (1943) - Vera Bailey
- Nobody's Darling (1943) - Lois
- Top Man (1943) - Erna Lane
- Nine Girls (1944) - Shirley Berke
- Lady in the Death House (1944) - Suzy Kirk Logan
- Snafu (1945) - Martha
- Street Corner (1948) - Lois Marsh
- Trouble Preferred (1948) - Virginia Evans
- Tucson (1949) - Polly Johnson
- Arson, Inc. (1949) - Betty - Fender's Secretary
- The Daughter of Rosie O'Grady (1950) - Katie O'Grady
- Hi-Jacked (1950) - Jean Harper
- Chicago Calling (1951) - Peggy
- The Star (1952) - Waitress (uncredited)
- Live a Little, Love a Little (1968) - Woman #1 (uncredited)
- Rogue's Gallery (1968) - Mrs. Hassanover
- The Way We Were (1973) - Peggy Vanderbilt
- The Spectre of Edgar Allan Poe (1974) - Sarah
