= The Gang's All Here (1941 film) =

1941 film

- DVD release cover
- Directed by: Jean Yarbrough
- Written by: Edmond Kelso
- Produced by: Lindsley Parsons
- Starring: Frankie Darro; Marcia Mae Jones; Jackie Moran; Keye Luke
- Cinematography: Mack Stengler
- Edited by: Jack Ogilvie
- Music by: Frank Sanucci
- Production company: Monogram Pictures
- Distributed by: Monogram Pictures
- Release date: June 11, 1941
- Running time: 61 minutes
- Country: United States
- Language: English

The Gang's All Here is a 1941 American crime drama film directed by Jean Yarbrough and starring Frankie Darro, Mantan Moreland, Marcia Mae Jones and Jackie Moran in a story about a trucking company targeted by saboteurs. Made by Monogram Pictures it was produced by Lindsley Parsons and is one of several that paired Darro and Moreland. The film is known under the alternative title In the Night in the United Kingdom.

== Plot ==
The Overland Transport Company, owned by Pop Wallace, is plagued by a series of attacks in which its trucks are forced off the road and their drivers killed. Unable to find experienced replacements, Pop hires Frankie O’Malley and his friend Jefferson “Jeff” Smith after they answer an advertisement for drivers. Pop’s daughter Patsy encourages the hiring, partly to make her boyfriend, company mechanic Chick Daly, jealous.

Unknown to Frankie and Jeff, Pop has been involved in an insurance fraud scheme with insurance agent Saunders. Pop had agreed to stage minor accidents and share the insurance payments, but Saunders, working with rival trucking operator Jack Norton, has escalated the scheme into deliberate wrecks and killings. Pop wants the attacks stopped, but Saunders refuses.

Frankie and Jeff survive an attempt by Norton’s men to force their truck off the road. Meanwhile, Pop hires George Lee, the son of an old friend, who claims that he wants to learn the trucking business. George behaves suspiciously, but eventually reveals that he is actually an investigator for the insurance company. After Frankie and Jeff disappear during another trip, Pop becomes suspicious when Saunders knows of their capture before anyone has informed him. Pop admits his involvement in the insurance scheme to George but refuses to identify Saunders and Norton until his drivers are safe.

Frankie and Jeff escape from Norton’s men and return to Overland, where they discover that their supposed cargo consists of bricks instead of canned goods. They also find Pop unconscious after he has been beaten. Believing that he was being coerced by the criminals, Frankie decides to gather evidence that will clear him.

Patsy and Chick, unaware that Saunders is behind the scheme, visit him for help and are taken hostage. Frankie and Jeff return to Norton’s garage and overhear Saunders and Norton discussing their plans, but they too are captured. The four prisoners are placed in a truck and driven into the countryside to be killed.

The criminals’ truck is stopped by police for speeding, delaying them long enough for George to arrive and expose the scheme. Saunders, Norton and their accomplices are arrested, and Patsy and Chick are reunited.

== Cast ==
- Frankie Darro as Frankie O'Malley
- Marcia Mae Jones as Patsy Wallace
- Jackie Moran as Chick Daly
- Keye Luke as George Lee
- Mantan Moreland as Jefferson Smith
- Robert Homans as Pop Wallace
- Irving Mitchell as R. A. Saunders
- Ed Cassidy as Jack Norton
- Pat Gleason as Henchman Marty
- Jack Kenney as Henchman Dink
- Jack Ingram as Matt
- Laurence Criner as Ham Shanks

== Bibliography ==
- Fetrow, Alan G. Feature Films, 1940-1949: a United States Filmography. McFarland, 1994.
