= Abilene Trail (film) =

1951 film by Lewis D. Collins

- Lobby card
- Directed by: Lewis D. Collins
- Written by: Harry L. Fraser
- Produced by: Vincent M. Fennelly
- Starring: Whip Wilson; Noel Neill; Andy Clyde
- Cinematography: Gilbert Warrenton
- Edited by: Richard V. Heermance
- Music by: Edward J. Kay
- Production company: Transwestern Pictures
- Distributed by: Monogram Pictures
- Release date: February 4, 1951
- Running time: 54 minutes
- Country: United States
- Language: English

Abilene Trail is a 1951 American Western film directed by Lewis D. Collins and starring Whip Wilson, Noel Neill and Andy Clyde.

== Plot ==
Dave Hill, known as the Kansas Kid, and his companion Sagebrush Charlie are fleeing a sheriff's posse after being wrongly accused of horse theft. They encounter Ed Dawson, a young rancher who helps them escape but is wounded in the process. Feeling responsible for him, Dave and Charlie take Ed to Tonto City for medical treatment despite the risk of being recognized from wanted posters. Ed explains that his father's ranch is short of workers for an upcoming cattle drive to Abilene. Hoping to repay him for his help, Dave and Charlie offer to join the Dawson outfit. The ranch's foreman, Brandon, initially tries to send them to work for rival rancher Colter, but hires them after they threaten to tell Ed that he refused their assistance. Suspicious of Brandon's actions, Ed sends Dave and Charlie ahead to the Dawson ranch. On the way, they encounter Ed's sister Mary, who mistakes them for troublemakers and attempts to stop them. At the ranch, Dave discovers that trail boss Red is encouraging Dawson's cowhands to abandon the ranch and join Colter's outfit. Dave intervenes and fights Red, helping prevent the men from leaving. Meanwhile, Mary discovers a wanted poster identifying Dave and Charlie and reports them to Sheriff Warner. As the law closes in, Dave and Charlie must clear their names while also exposing the effort to undermine the Dawson ranch and its cattle drive.

== Cast ==
- Whip Wilson as Dave Hill aka The Kansas Kid
- Andy Clyde as Sagebrush Charlie
- Tommy Farrell as Ed Dawson
- Steve Clark as old man Dawson
- Noel Neill as Mary Dawson
- Dennis Moore as Brandon
- Marshall Reed as Jack Slavens
- Lee Roberts as Red
- Milburn Morante as Cowhand Chuck
- Ted Adams as town Sheriff
- Bill Kennedy as rancher Colter
- Stanley Price as Sheriff Warner
- Lyle Talbot as Dr. Martin
