= June Preisser =

American actress

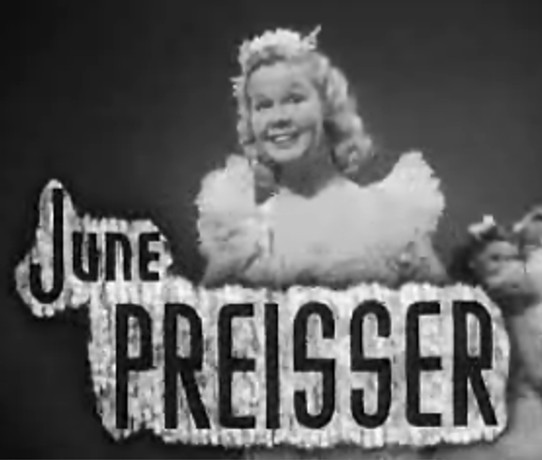
- from the trailer for the film Strike Up the Band (1940)
- Born: June 26, 1918; New Orleans, Louisiana, U.S.
- Died: September 19, 1984 (aged 66); Pompano Beach, Florida, U.S.
- Years active: 1936–1952
- Spouse(s): J. Moss Terry (1942–19??; divorced)
- Children: 1

June Preisser (June 26, 1918 – September 19, 1984) was an American actress, popular in musical films during the late 1930s and through the 1940s, many of which capitalized on her skills as an acrobat.

== Life and career ==
Born June 26, 1918, in New Orleans, Preisser was one of six children. As a child, she was underweight and began going to an athletic club in an attempt to build strength and gain weight. It was there that Preisser and her sister Cherry learned acrobatics, in which they excelled. Their mother was keen to have them follow a career in show business, especially when their father died suddenly, leaving the family with few options to make a living. When Preisser was nine years old, an actor noticed the two sisters performing acrobatics on a sidewalk near their home, and his interest led to their working in vaudeville and later for the Ziegfeld Follies in 1934 and 1936.

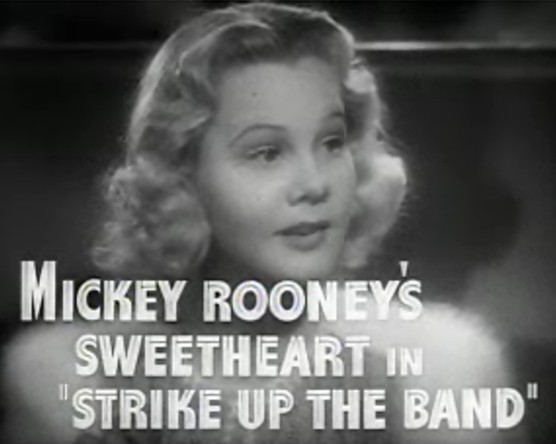
from the trailer for Gallant Sons (1940)

The Preisser sisters were successful in the United States, and performed in Europe, including for George VI of the United Kingdom. Cherry retired after she was married on June 22, 1937, thus ending their team. In 1938, June tumbled alone in the Broadway musical You Never Know.

June was signed to a film contract by MGM. Her first film, Dancing Co-Ed (1939), provided only a small part, but her next film, Babes in Arms (1939), gave her a significant role opposite Mickey Rooney and Judy Garland. She performed with Rooney and Garland again in Strike Up the Band (1940), and with Rooney in two "Andy Hardy" films, Judge Hardy and Son (1939) and Andy Hardy's Private Secretary (1941).

In 1940, Preisser appeared in Gallant Sons, a comedic murder mystery. The following year, she played her first lead role opposite Jimmy Lydon in Henry Aldrich for President (1941), and followed this with Sweater Girl (1942), opposite Eddie Bracken. She continued her career following her marriage in 1942 to radio announcer J. Moss Terry. The couple had a son, Richard Josiah “Ricky”, the following year and later divorced.

By this time, MGM had little interest in promoting Preisser’s career. She left MGM and began working for Monogram Pictures. Preisser continued to appear in musical comedies over the next few years, and played the character Dodie Rogers in seven The Teen Agers films with Freddie Stewart, Frankie Darro and Noel Neill from 1946 to 1948. She made her final film appearance in Music Man (1948). After appearing in a Los Angeles theater production of Annie Get Your Gun, Preisser retired from acting.

== Later years and death ==
After retiring from acting in the early 1950s, Preisser taught dancing and acrobatics in Los Angeles. She then moved with her son, Richard Josiah Terry, to Boca Raton, Florida. From 1972 until her death, Preisser worked at Pompano Office Supply with her son.

In the early morning hours of September 19, 1984, Preisser was the passenger in her son’s car when the two were involved in a fatal car accident in Pompano Beach, Florida, when a van crossed the median into their lane. Police attributed the accident to rainy conditions. Richard Terry died at the scene while Preisser later died of her injuries at North Broward Medical Center.

== Filmography ==
- Wash Your Step (1936) as June O'Brien
- Dancing Co-Ed (1939) as "Ticky" James
- Babes in Arms (1939) as "Baby" Rosalie Essex
- Judge Hardy and Son (1939) as Euphrasia "Phrasie Daisy" Clark
- Strike Up the Band (1940) as Barbara Frances Morgan
- Gallant Sons (1940) as Miss Dolly Matson
- Andy Hardy's Private Secretary (1941) as Euphrasia "Phrasie Daisy" Clark
- Henry Aldrich for President (1941) as Geraldine Adams
- Sweater Girl (1942) as Susan Lawrence
- Babes on Swing Street (1944) as Fern Wallace
- Murder in the Blue Room (1944) as Jerry
- Let's Go Steady (1945) as Mable Stack
- I'll Tell the World (1945) as Marge Bailey
- Junior Prom (1946) as Dodie Rogers
- Freddie Steps Out (1946) as Dodie Rogers
- High School Hero (1946) as Dodie
- Vacation Days (1947) as Dodie Rogers
- Sarge Goes to College (1947) as Dodie Rogers
- Two Blondes and a Redhead (1947) as Patti Calhoun
- Smart Politics (1948) as Dodie Rogers
- Campus Sleuth (1948) as Dodie Rogers
- Music Man (1948) as June Larkin
