= The Devil Horse (1932 serial) =

1932 film

- Poster of the chapter "Wild Loyalty"
- Directed by: Otto Brower; Yakima Canutt (second unit director); Richard Talmadge (second unit director)
- Written by: George Morgan; Barney A. Sarecky; George H. Plympton; Wyndham Gittens
- Produced by: Nat Levine
- Starring: Harry Carey; Noah Beery; Frankie Darro; Greta Granstedt; Barrie O'Daniels
- Cinematography: Ernest Miller; Victor Scheurich; Carl Wester
- Edited by: Ray Snyder; Gilmore Walker
- Music by: Lee Zahler
- Distributed by: Mascot Pictures
- Release date: November 1, 1932
- Running time: 12 chapters (216 min)
- Country: United States
- Language: English

The Devil Horse is a 1932 American Pre-Code movie serial starring Harry Carey, Frankie Darro and Noah Beery that was distributed by Mascot Pictures. This is regarded as the best of the three serials Harry Carey made in the early 1930s, the other two being Last of the Mohicans and The Vanishing Legion. Frankie Darro had co-starred with Carey previously in The Vanishing Legion. Lane Chandler played the murdered ranger Elliott Norton, uncredited.

== Plot ==
Hank Canfield (Noah Beery), leader of a gang of horse thieves, attempts to steal a wild racehorse called El Diablo. The crooks bungle the job, but they kill a Ranger named Elliott Norton (Lane Chandler) in escaping. The ranger's older brother Bob (Harry Carey) sets out to bring his brother's killers to justice, not realizing the apparently respectable Canfield is the guilty party. A young mute orphan referred to as the Wild Boy (Frankie Darro) is the only one in town who knows who the killer is, and Bob Norton attempts to communicate with the child to draw the secret out of him. Meanwhile, the horse thieves make further attempts to kidnap the prized racehorse.

== Cast ==
- Harry Carey as Bob Norton, aka Roberts
- Noah Beery as Canfield
- Frankie Darro as The Wild Boy
- Greta Granstedt as Linda Weston
- Barrie O'Daniels as Lee Weston
- Edward Peil Sr. as The Sheriff
- Jack Mower as Mark Adams
- Al Bridge as Curley Bates
- Lew Kelly as The father
- Lane Chandler as Elliott Norton (uncredited)
- Apache, King of the Wild Horses as "El Diablo"

== Release ==
=== Home media ===
The Devil Horse was released on DVD by Alpha Video on June 24, 2008. All 12 chapters are on one disc.

== Chapter titles ==
1. Untamed
2. Chasm of Death
3. Doom Riders
4. Vigilante Law
5. The Silent Call
6. Heart of the Mystery
7. Battle of the Strong
8. The Missing Witness
9. The Showdown
10. The Death Trap
11. Wild Loyalty
12. The Double Decoy

_{Source:}

== See also ==
- List of film serials by year
- List of film serials by studio

| Preceded by The Hurricane Express (1932) | Mascot Serial; The Devil Horse (1932) | Succeeded by The Whispering Shadow (1933) |
