= The Barefoot Boy (film) =

1923 film by David Kirkland

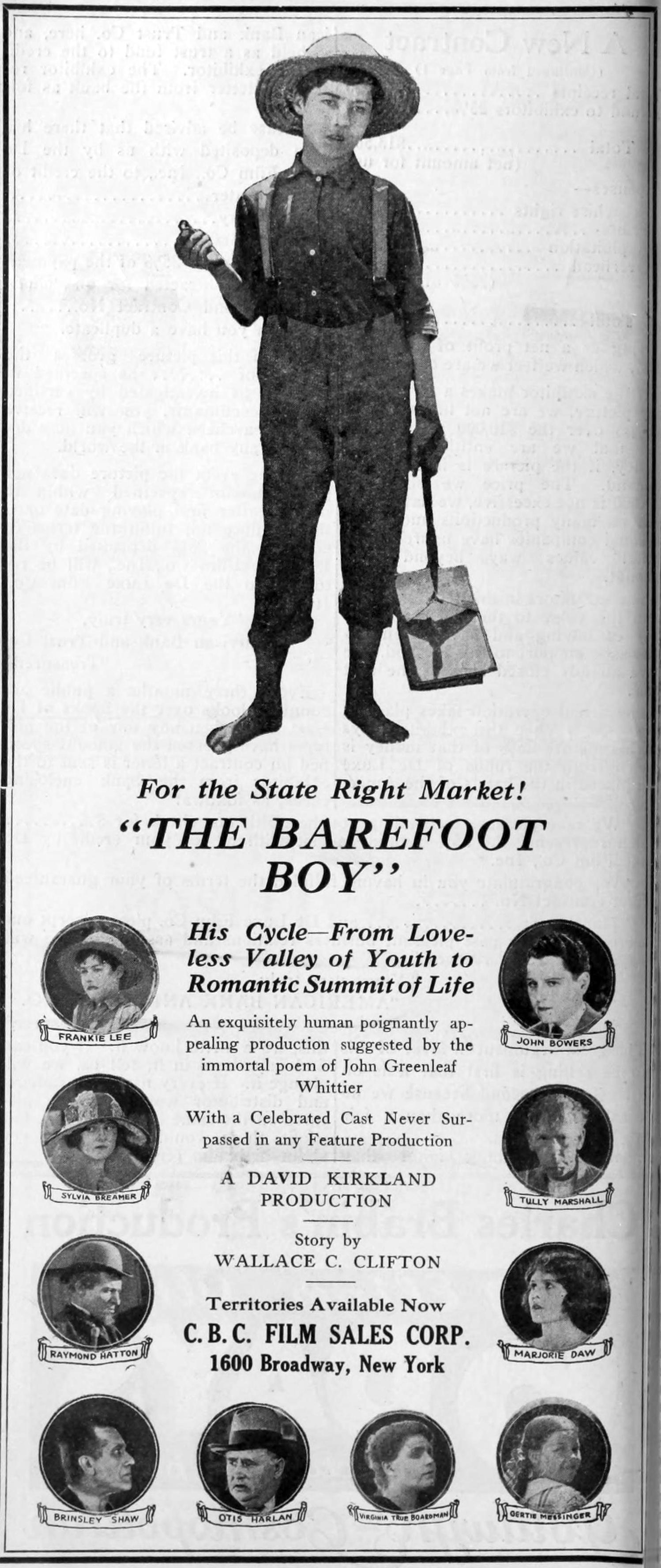
- Advertisement
- Directed by: David Kirkland
- Written by: Wallace Clifton
- Based on: "The Barefoot Boy" by John Greenleaf Whittier
- Produced by: Harry Cohn
- Starring: John Bowers; Marjorie Daw; Sylvia Breamer
- Cinematography: David Abel
- Production company: Mission Film Corporation
- Distributed by: CBC Film Sales Corporation
- Release date: September 1, 1923
- Running time: 58 minutes
- Country: United States
- Language: Silent (English intertitles)

The Barefoot Boy is a 1923 American silent drama film directed by David Kirkland and starring John Bowers, Marjorie Daw, and Sylvia Breamer. The film is based upon a poem of the same name by John Greenleaf Whittier. The film was released by the CBC Film Sales Corporation, which would later become Columbia Pictures.

== Cast ==
- John Bowers as Dick Alden
- Marjorie Daw as Mary Truesdale
- Sylvia Breamer as Milicent Carter
- George A. McDaniel as Rodman Grant
- Raymond Hatton as Deacon Holloway
- Tully Marshall as Tom Adams
- George Periolat as Si Parker
- Virginia True Boardman as Mrs. Blake
- Brinsley Shaw as Josiah Blake
- Harry Todd as Bill Hawkins
- Otis Harlan as Wilson
- Frankie Lee as Dick Alden - as a Child
- Gertrude Messinger as Mary Truesdale - as a Child
- Lottie Williams as Mrs. Hawkins
- Spec O'Donnell as Schoolboy

== Preservation ==
Partial prints of The Barefoot Boy are maintained by the UCLA Film and Television Archive and George Eastman Museum Motion Picture Collection.

== Bibliography ==
- Bernard F. Dick. Columbia Pictures: Portrait of a Studio. University Press of Kentucky, 2015. ISBN 978-0-8131-4961-5
