= Music Man (1948 film) =

1948 film

- Directed by: Will Jason
- Screenplay by: Sam Mintz
- Produced by: Will Jason; Maurice Duke
- Starring: Jimmy Dorsey; Freddie Stewart; June Preisser
- Cinematography: Jackson Rose
- Edited by: William Austin
- Music by: Edward J. Kay
- Production company: Monogram Pictures
- Distributed by: Monogram Pictures
- Release date: September 5, 1948
- Running time: 66 minutes
- Country: United States
- Language: English

Music Man is a 1948 American musical comedy film directed by Will Jason. Jimmy Dorsey and His Orchestra appear alongside Freddie Stewart, June Preisser and Noel Neill. It was produced by Monogram Pictures.

== Plot ==
Two New York brothers, Phil and Freddie Russo, work as songwriters for their publisher, Saunders. June Larkin invites them to perform at a benefit that her parents are hosting. Kitty, the brothers' secretary, is secretly in love with Phil, but Phil is in love with June.

After the benefit, Kitty visits Phil and Freddie's mother to get her to stop the fighting between the brothers. The milkman Joe, drives Kitty home. On the way, he reads the lyrics of one of his new songs.

Mrs. Russo throws a party for her sons and decides to live with them. But they remain rivals over June. Freddie moves away but the brothers continue to write together. The strain, however, results in the poor quality of their songs. Saunders tells Freddie they will not publish them so Freddie forms his own company.

The company goes under but Freddie refuses to accept financial help from band leader Jimmy Dorsey. Kitty gets Joe to engineer a reconciliation between the brothers. He tricks them into collaborating on a new musical show. The show is a success but the brothers want to stop it from going forward because of the trickery that was used to get them to work on it. They file injunctions to stop it but their mother informs them that she has invested in the show. They allow the show to continue. It is a huge success and leads to their reconciliation.

== Music ==
Jimmy Dorsey and His Orchestra perform the following songs in the film: "Bella Bella Marie", "Little Man, You've Had a Busy Day", "I Could Swear It Was You", and "Shy Ann (from Old Cheyenne)".

== Cast ==
- Jimmy Dorsey
- Freddie Stewart
- Alan Hale Jr.
- Phil Brito
- June Preisser
- Noel Neill
- Chick Chandler
