= His Regeneration =

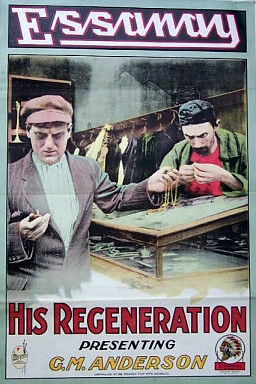
- Film poster
- Directed by: Gilbert M. 'Broncho Billy' Anderson
- Written by: Gilbert M. 'Broncho Billy' Anderson
- Produced by: Gilbert M. 'Broncho Billy' Anderson
- Starring: Gilbert M. 'Broncho Billy' Anderson; Marguerite Clayton; Lee Willard; Hazel Applegate; Belle Mitchell; Lloyd Bacon; Robert McKenzie; Bill Cato; Darr Wittenmyer; Victor Potel; Charles Chaplin (uncredited)
- Distributed by: Essanay Studios
- Release date: May 7, 1915
- Running time: 15 minutes
- Country: United States
- Language: Silent (English intertitles)

His Regeneration is a 1915 American silent drama film made by Essanay Studios. It featured Charlie Chaplin in an uncredited role as a customer.

== Plot ==
His Regeneration (1915)

A rough criminal gets into an argument over a girl in a dance hall.

== Cast ==
- Gilbert M. 'Broncho Billy' Anderson as The Regenerate Burglar
- Marguerite Clayton as The Girl
- Lee Willard as The Regenerate Burglar
- Hazel Applegate as The Maid
- Belle Mitchell as The Saloon Girl
- Lloyd Bacon as The Regenerate Burglar
- Robert McKenzie as The Waiter
- Bill Cato as First Cop at House
- Darr Wittenmyer as Second Cop at House
- Victor Potel as The Pawn Shop Clerk
- Charles Chaplin as The Customer

== See also ==
- List of American films of 1915
