= Secrets of a Co-Ed =

1942 film by Joseph H. Lewis

- Theatrical release poster
- Directed by: Joseph H. Lewis
- Screenplay by: George Wallace Sayre
- Produced by: Alfred Stern; Arthur Alexander
- Starring: Otto Kruger; Tina Thayer; Rick Vallin; Russell Hoyt; Marcia Mae Jones; Geraldine Spreckels
- Cinematography: Robert E. Cline
- Edited by: Charles Henkel Jr.
- Production company: Alexander-Stern Productions
- Distributed by: Producers Releasing Corporation
- Release date: October 26, 1942
- Running time: 67 minutes
- Country: United States
- Language: English

Secrets of a Co-Ed is a 1942 American crime film directed by Joseph H. Lewis and written by George Wallace Sayre. The film stars Otto Kruger, Tina Thayer, Rick Vallin, Russell Hoyt, Marcia Mae Jones and Geraldine Spreckels. The film was released on October 26, 1942, by Producers Releasing Corporation.

== Cast ==
- Otto Kruger as James Reynolds
- Tina Thayer as Brenda Reynolds
- Rick Vallin as Nick Jordan
- Russell Hoyt as Bill
- Marcia Mae Jones as Laura Wright
- Geraldine Spreckels as Tessie Smith
- Diana Del Rio as Maria
- Herb Vigran as Soapy
- Patricia Knox as Flo
- Claire Rochelle as Miss Wilson
- Addison Richards as District Attorney
- Isabelle LaMal as College Dean Sophie
