= The Boss of Big Town =

1942 film by Arthur Dreifuss

- Directed by: Arthur Dreifuss
- Written by: Arthur Hoerl (story); Edward Dein (screenplay)
- Produced by: Harry D. Edwards (associate producer); Jack Schwarz (producer)
- Starring: See below
- Cinematography: Marcel Le Picard
- Edited by: Charles Henkel Jr.
- Music by: Leo Erdody
- Distributed by: Producers Releasing Corporation
- Release date: December 7, 1942
- Running time: 62 minutes
- Country: United States
- Language: English

The Boss of Big Town is a 1942 American film directed by Arthur Dreifuss.

An undercover market inspector thwarts a plot to take over the food market supply to towns in America during WWII.

== Cast ==
- John Litel as Michael Lynn
- Florence Rice as Linda Gregory
- H. B. Warner as Jeffrey Moore
- John Miljan as Craige
- Jean Brooks as Iris Moore
- David Bacon as Dr. Gil Page
- Mary Gordon as Mrs. Lane
- Frank Ferguson as Bram Hart
- Lloyd Ingraham as Insp. Torrence
- John Maxwell as Foster
- Paul Dubov as Graham
- Patricia Prest as Frances Hart
