= High School Hero (1946 film) =

1946 American film

- Directed by: Arthur Dreifuss
- Written by: Hal Collins; Arthur Dreifuss
- Produced by: Sam Katzman
- Starring: Freddie Stewart; June Preisser; Noel Neill; Jackie Moran
- Cinematography: Ira H. Morgan
- Edited by: Richard Currier; Ace Herman
- Music by: Edward J. Kay
- Production company: Monogram Pictures
- Distributed by: Sam Katzman Productions
- Release date: September 7, 1946
- Running time: 69 minutes
- Country: United States
- Language: English

High School Hero is a 1946 American comedy film directed by Arthur Dreifuss and starring Freddie Stewart, June Preisser and Noel Neill. It is the third of The Teen Agers series and was also known as High School Scandal.

== Cast ==
- Freddie Stewart as Freddie Trimball
- June Preisser as Dodie Rogers
- Noel Neill as Betty Rogers
- Anne Rooney as Addie Rogers
- Warren Mills as Lee Roberts
- Jackie Moran as Jimmy Forrest
- Frankie Darro as Roy Donne
- Milton Kibbee as Prof. Townley
- Belle Mitchell as Miss Hinklefink
- Lita Baron as Chi-Chi
- Douglas Fowley as Coach Carter
- Edythe Elliott as Mrs. Rogers
- Leonard Penn as Prof. Farrell
- Pierre Watkin as Gov. Huffington
- Dick Elliott as Mayor Whitehead
- Joe DeRita as Tiny
