= Arthur Dreifuss =

American film director

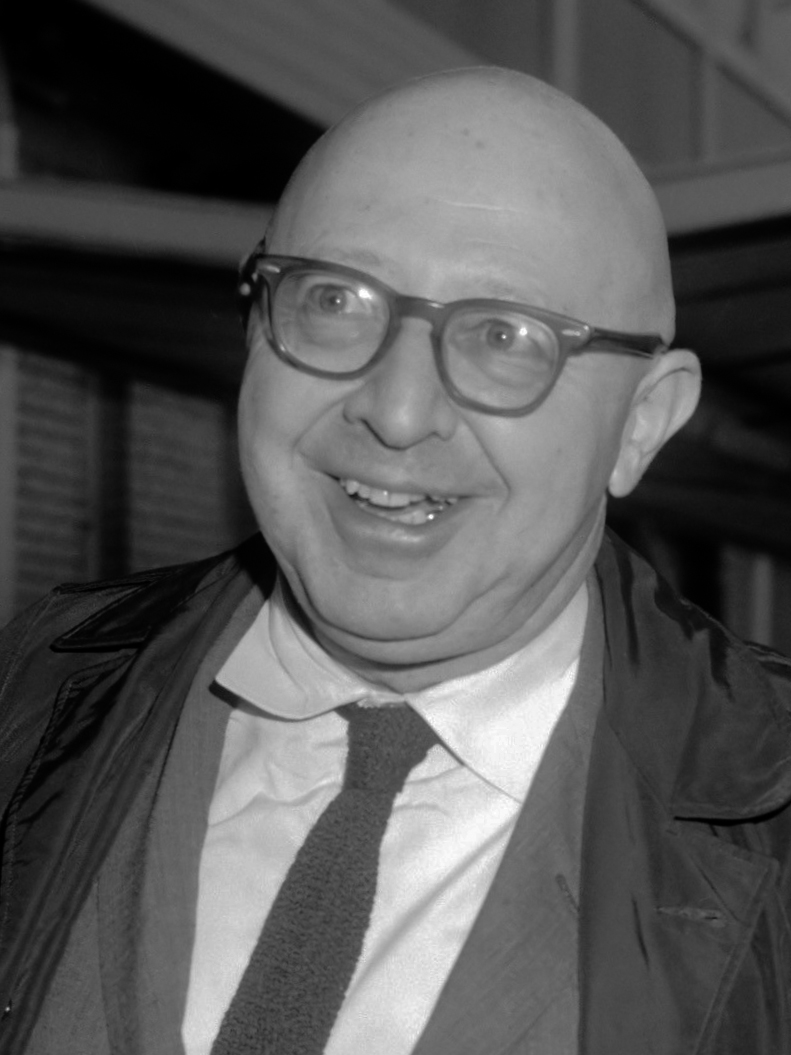
- Arrival of Dreifuss at Schiphol on May 10, 1965.
- Born: March 25, 1908; Frankfurt, Germany
- Died: December 31, 1993 (aged 85); Los Angeles, California
- Occupations: Film director, theatrical producer, choreographer
- Years active: 1931 - 1968
- Spouse(s): Ruth Cross, April 27, 1934 - ? Barbara Brier (September 23, 1949–September 12, 1956; divorced)
- Children: 4

Arthur Dreifuss (sometimes credited as Dreyfuss; March 25, 1908 – December 31, 1993) was a German-born American film director, and occasional producer, screenwriter and choreographer.

Dreifuss was active from 1939 through 1968, directing about 50 films and producing a few Columbia Pictures short subjects. Toward the end of his career, Dreifuss concentrated on youth culture films and exploitation movies.

== Selected filmography ==
- Double Deal (1939)
- Mystery in Swing (1940)
- Sunday Sinners (1940)
- Reg'lar Fellers (1941)
- Murder on Lenox Avenue (1941)
- The Boss of Big Town (1942)
- Baby Face Morgan (1942)
- The Payoff (1942)
- Campus Rhythm (1943)
- Nearly Eighteen (1943)
- Sarong Girl (1943)
- The Sultan's Daughter (1943)
- Melody Parade (1943)
- Ever Since Venus (1944)
- Eadie Was a Lady (1945)
- Prison Ship (1945)
- Boston Blackie Booked on Suspicion (1945)
- Boston Blackie's Rendezvous (1945)
- The Gay Senorita (1945)
- Junior Prom (1946, first of the "Teen Agers" series)
- Freddie Steps Out (1946, second of the "Teen Agers" series)
- High School Hero (1946, third of the "Teen Agers" series)
- Betty Co-Ed (1946)
- Vacation Days (1947, fourth of the "Teen Agers" series)
- Little Miss Broadway (1947)
- Sweet Genevieve (1947)
- Two Blondes and a Redhead (1947)
- Glamour Girl (1948)
- Mary Lou (1948)
- I Surrender Dear (1948)
- An Old-Fashioned Girl (1949)
- Shamrock Hill (1949)
- Manhattan Angel (1949)
- There's a Girl in My Heart (1949)
- Life Begins at 17 (1958)
- Juke Box Rhythm (1959)
- The Last Blitzkrieg (1959)
- The Quare Fellow (1962)
- The Love-Ins (1967)
- Riot on Sunset Strip (1967)
- The Young Runaways (1968)
- For Singles Only (1968)
- A Time to Sing (1968)
