= Sarge Goes to College =

1947 film

- Directed by: Will Jason
- Produced by: Maurice Duke; Will Jason
- Starring: Freddie Stewart; June Preisser; Frankie Darro
- Cinematography: Mack Stengler
- Edited by: Jason H. Bernie
- Music by: Edward J. Kay
- Production company: Monogram Pictures
- Distributed by: Monogram Pictures
- Release date: May 13, 1947
- Running time: 63 minutes
- Country: United States
- Language: English

Sarge Goes to College is a 1947 American musical comedy film directed by Will Jason and starring Freddie Stewart, June Preisser and Frankie Darro. It was produced and distributed by Monogram Pictures as part of The Teen Agers series.

== Plot ==
A sergeant in the marines is wounded in combat. He returns to America and temporarily enrolls in college and has to adjust to student life.

== Cast ==
- Freddie Stewart as Freddie Trimball
- June Preisser as Dodie Rogers
- Frankie Darro as Roy Donne
- Warren Mills as Lee Watson
- Noel Neill as Betty Rogers
- Alan Hale Jr. as Sarge
- Arthur Walsh as Arthur Walsh
- Russ Morgan as Russ Morgan
- Monte Collins as Dean McKinley
- Frank Cady as Prof. Edwards
- Margaret Brayton as Miss Koregmeyer
- Selmer Jackson as Marine Capt. R.S. Handler
- Earl Bennett as Eddie
- Margaret Bert as Mrs. Rogers
- Harry Tyler as Mr. Rogers
- Pat Goldin as Rooming House Manager
- William Forrest as Col. Winters
