= I'll Tell the World (1945 film) =

1945 film

- Theatrical release poster
- Directed by: Leslie Goodwins
- Screenplay by: Henry Blankfort; Lester Pine
- Produced by: Frank Gross
- Starring: Lee Tracy; Brenda Joyce; Raymond Walburn; June Preisser; Thomas Gomez; Howard Freeman
- Cinematography: Paul Ivano
- Edited by: Ray Snyder
- Production company: Universal Pictures
- Distributed by: Universal Pictures
- Release date: June 8, 1945
- Running time: 61 minutes
- Country: United States
- Language: English

I'll Tell the World is a 1945 American comedy film directed by Leslie Goodwins and written by Henry Blankfort and Lester Pine. The film stars Lee Tracy, Brenda Joyce, Raymond Walburn, June Preisser, Thomas Gomez and Howard Freeman. The film was released on June 8, 1945, by Universal Pictures.

== Cast ==
- Lee Tracy as Gabriel Patton
- Brenda Joyce as Lorna Gray
- Raymond Walburn as H.I. Bailey
- June Preisser as Marge Bailey
- Thomas Gomez as J.B. Kindell
- Howard Freeman as Lester Westchester
- Lorin Raker as Perkins
- Janet Shaw as Switchboard Operator
- Pierre Watkin as Dr. Mullins
- Peter Potter as Announcer
- Gene Rodgers as Piano Specialty
- Jimmie Dean as Jimmie Dean
- Jean Aloise as Dance Specialty
