= Vacation Days =

1947 film

- Directed by: Arthur Dreifuss
- Written by: Hal Collins
- Produced by: Sam Katzman
- Starring: Freddie Stewart; June Preisser; Frankie Darro; Noel Neill
- Cinematography: Ira H. Morgan
- Edited by: Ace Herman
- Music by: Edward J. Kay
- Production company: Monogram Pictures
- Distributed by: Monogram Pictures
- Release date: January 25, 1947
- Running time: 68 minutes
- Country: United States
- Language: English

Vacation Days is a 1947 American Western musical film directed by Arthur Dreifuss and starring Freddie Stewart, June Preisser, and Frankie Darro. It is part of The Teen Agers series.

== Plot ==
Miss Hinklefink (Belle Mitchell) inherits a western ranch and, in order to spend the summer with Professor Owen Townley (Milton Kibbee), she invites students Freddie Trimball (Freddie Stewart), Dodie Rogers (June Preisser), Betty Rogers (Noel Neill), Lee Watson (Warren Mills) and Roy Donne (Frankie Darro) to spend their vacation on the ranch if Townley will help chaperone the kids. Real estate agent Tom Sneed (Hugh Prosser) tries to persuade her to send the kids home when desperadoes rob the bank. In the saloon, Sneed's henchman Charlie (Terry Frost) mistakes Freddie for a baby-faced killer, who was blamed for a murder actually committed by Sneed, and ranch foreman Big Jim (John Hart), also working for Sneed, tries to kill Freddie.

== Cast ==
- Freddie Stewart as Freddie Trimball
- June Preisser as Dodie Rogers
- Frankie Darro as Roy Donne
- Warren Mills as Lee Watson
- Noel Neill as Betty Rogers
- Milton Kibbee as Professor Owen Townley
- Belle Mitchell as Miss Hinklefink
- John Hart as Big Jim
- Hugh Prosser as Tom Sneed
- Terry Frost as Charlie
- Edythe Elliott as Mrs. Rogers
- Claire James as Indian Girl
- Spade Cooley as Spade Cooley
- Jerry Wald as Orchestra Leader Jerry Wald
- Spade Cooley Band as Western Band
- Jerry Wald and His Orchestra as Jerry Wald's Orchestra
- Forrest Taylor as Sheriff
