= Smart Politics (film) =

1948 film

- Directed by: Will Jason
- Screenplay by: Hal Collins
- Story by: Hal Collins; Monte Collins
- Produced by: Will Jason
- Starring: Freddie Stewart; June Preisser
- Cinematography: Mark Stengler
- Edited by: William Austin
- Music by: (see Songs below)
- Production company: Monogram Pictures
- Distributed by: Monogram Pictures (US); Pathé Pictures Ltd. (UK)
- Release date: January 3, 1948 (US)
- Running time: 65-66 minutes
- Country: United States
- Language: English

Smart Politics is a 1948 American film directed by Will Jason and starring Freddie Stewart and June Preisser. It is part of The Teen Agers series made by Monogram Pictures.

== Cast ==
- Freddie Stewart as Freddie Trimball
- June Preisser as Dodie Rogers
- Frankie Darro as Roy Dunne
- Warren Mills as Lee Watson
- Noel Neill as Betty Rogers
- Donald MacBride as The Mayor (Phineas Wharton, Jr./ Phineas Wharton, Sr.)
- Gene Krupa and His Orchestra
- Martha Davis as Martha

== Songs ==
- "Kitchen Blues" – words and music by Freddie Stewart and Hal Collins
- "The Young Man with a Beat" – words and music by Freddie Stewart
- "Isn't This a Night for Love" – words and music by Will Jason, Sid Robin and Val Burton
- "Sincerely Yours" – words and music by Will Jason and Sid Robin
