= Will Jason =

American film director

- Born: William Jacobson; June 23, 1910; New York City, U.S.
- Died: February 10, 1970 (aged 59); Guadalajara, Mexico
- Occupation: Director
- Years active: 1938–1960

Will Jason (June 23, 1910 – February 10, 1970) was an American film and television director. He shot a number of short films for MGM during the early 1940s.

== Selected filmography ==
- The Soul of a Monster (1944)
- Tahiti Nights (1944)
- Eve Knew Her Apples (1945)
- Ten Cents a Dance (1945)
- Blonde Alibi (1946)
- The Dark Horse (1946)
- Idea Girl (1946)
- Slightly Scandalous (1946)
- Sarge Goes to College (1947)
- Smart Politics (1948)
- Music Man (1948)
- Campus Sleuth (1948)
- Rusty Leads the Way (1948)
- Kazan (1949)
- Everybody's Dancin' (1950)
- Disc Jockey (1951)
- Chain of Circumstance (1951)
- Thief of Damascus (1952)

== Bibliography ==
- Bernard A. Drew. Motion Picture Series and Sequels: A Reference Guide. Routledge, 2013.
