= Freddie Stewart (actor) =

American actor (1925–2000)

- Born: Morris Joseph Lazar; March 25, 1925; New York City, U.S.
- Died: August 15, 2000 (aged 75); Los Angeles, California, U.S.
- Occupations: Actor; singer
- Spouse: Lola Katherine DeWitt (m. 1951)
- Children: April Stewart
- Musical career
- Genres: Traditional pop; big band; swing
- Instrument: Vocals
- Labels: Capitol; Bel-Tone

Freddie Stewart (born Morris Joseph Lazar; March 25, 1925 – August 15, 2000) was an American actor and big band singer. He is best known for appearing in the Monogram Pictures film series The Teen Agers from 1946 to 1948.

== Life and career ==
Stewart was born in New York City. He dropped out of school to work as a stock clerk and also worked summers at a Catskills resort. He renamed himself Freddie Stewart (after actors James Stewart and Freddie Bartholomew) when he joined the Cappy Barra Harmonica Band in 1939. By the next year, he was working as a vocalist with Clyde McCoy's orchestra for $60 a week. He worked his way up to his own radio show in New York on NBC, the fifteen-minute nightly, Freddie Stewart Sings.

He wrote a song called "Do I Know What I'm Doing" for She's for Me (1943) and made an appearance in She's a Sweetheart (1944). He later joined Tommy Dorsey's band as a singer for a year.

In 1945, he signed with Monogram Pictures to make a series of movies.

== Filmography ==
- Junior Prom (1946)
- Freddie Steps Out (1946)
- High School Hero (1946)
- Vacation Days (1947)
- Louisiana (1947)
- Sarge Goes to College (1947)
- Campus Sleuth (1948)
- Smart Politics (1948)
- Music Man (1948)
