= Let's Go Steady =

1945 film

- Directed by: Del Lord
- Written by: Erna Lazarus; William Sackheim
- Produced by: Ted Richmond
- Starring: Pat Parrish; Jackie Moran; June Preisser; Mel Torme
- Cinematography: Benjamin H. Kline
- Edited by: Richard Fantl
- Music by: George Duning
- Production company: Columbia Pictures
- Distributed by: Columbia Pictures
- Release date: January 4, 1945
- Running time: 60 minutes
- Country: United States
- Language: English

Let's Go Steady is a 1945 American musical film directed by Del Lord, produced by Columbia Pictures, and starring Pat Parrish, Jackie Moran, June Preisser, and Mel Tormé.

== Cast ==
- Jackie Moran as Roy Spencer
- June Preisser as Mable Stack
- Jimmy Lloyd as Henry McCoy
- Mel Tormé as Streak Edwards
- Pat Parrish as Linda Saxon
- Arnold Stang as Chet Carson
- Skinnay Ennis as Larry Tyler
- William Moss as Andy
- Byron Foulger as Waldemar Oates
- Gladys Blake as Miss Schlepheimer
- Eddie Bruce as Freddie Williams
- William Frambes as Bertram Quill
