= Campus Sleuth =

1948 film

- Directed by: Will Jason
- Written by: Hal Collins
- Produced by: Will Jason
- Starring: Freddie Stewart; June Preisser; Warren Mills
- Edited by: William Austin
- Production company: Monogram Pictures
- Release date: April 4, 1948
- Running time: 57 minutes
- Country: United States
- Language: English

Campus Sleuth is a 1948 American comedy film, part of The Teen Agers series.

== Cast ==
- Freddie Stewart as Freddie Trimball
- June Preisser as Dodie Rogers
- Warren Mills as Lee Watson
- Noel Neill as Betty Rogers
- Donald MacBride as Insp. Watson
- Monte Collins as Dean McKinley
- Stan Ross as Richard Winkler
- Paul Beyar as Houser
- Harry Tyler as Mr. Rogers
