= Dancing Co-Ed =

1939 romantic comedy film directed by S. Sylvan Simon

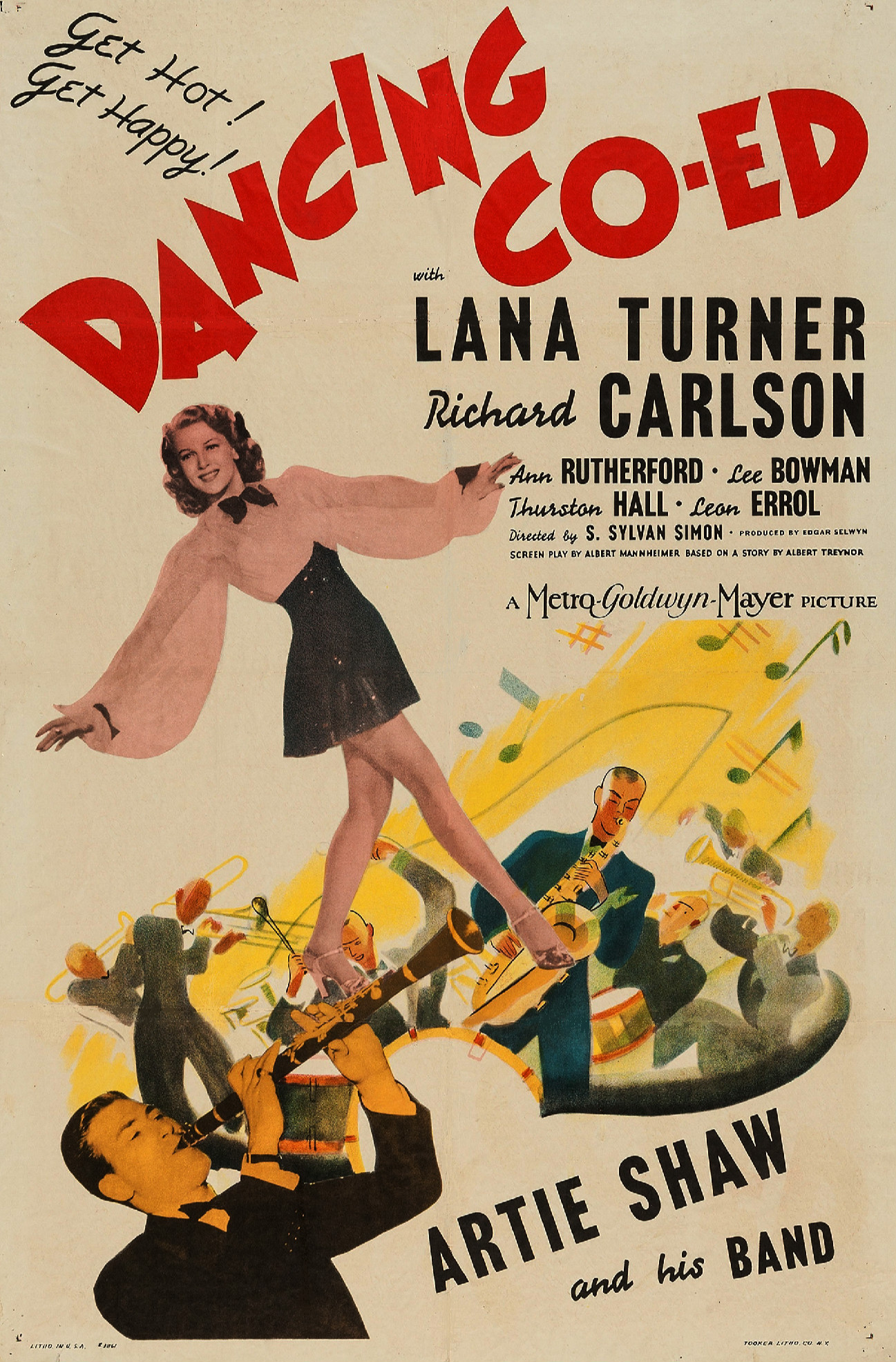
- Directed by: S. Sylvan Simon
- Written by: Albert Mannheimer; Herbert Fields (uncredited)
- Based on: The Dancing Coed by Albert Treynor
- Produced by: Edgar Selwyn
- Starring: Lana Turner; Richard Carlson; Artie Shaw
- Cinematography: Alfred Gilks
- Edited by: W. Donn Hayes
- Music by: David Snell; Edward Ward
- Production company: Metro-Goldwyn-Mayer
- Distributed by: Loew's, Inc.
- Release date: September 29, 1939
- Running time: 84 minutes
- Country: United States
- Language: English
- Budget: $425,000
- Box office: $713,000

Dancing Co-Ed (released as Every Other Inch a Lady in the United Kingdom) is a 1939 American screwball comedy film directed by S. Sylvan Simon and starring Lana Turner, Richard Carlson, and Artie Shaw. The plot involves a college dance contest staged by a film producer whose lead star has unexpectedly dropped out of his film upon discovering she was pregnant. The film marked Turner's first starring role, and features early uncredited appearances from Veronica Lake, Dick Winslow, and Robert Walker.

== Plot ==
Henry Workman, a mogul of the film studio Monarch Pictures, is forced to recast the lead of his new musical film after Toddy Tobin, the dancing partner and wife of star Freddy Tobin, discovers she is pregnant. In an attempt to salvage the production, press agent Joe Drews devises a scheme of staging a dance contest at a small Midwestern college in order to find a replacement.

Patty Marlow, the daughter of esteemed vaudevillian Pops Marlow, is planted in the competition to be the winner of the contest. Joe goes to significant lengths to secure Patty's position, forcing her to take entrance exams and officially enroll at the college. Pug Braddock, a student and editor of the campus newspaper, is suspicious of Patty and the competition, and begins investigating.

Through several interactions with Pug, Patty swiftly falls in love with him, as well as becoming significantly interested in journalism. After Pug and Patty publish scandalous photographs of the college faculty, they are threatened with expulsion. The college's president sends for Patty's father, prompting Patty to confess the truth to Pug. Patty insists on completing her role in the competition, which angers Pug.

On the day of the competition, Henry arrives on campus to announce the winner. To prevent the plot from being completed, Pug and his friends kidnap Patty, but she convinces Pug to allow her to return to the contest. Meanwhile, Joe has placed student Eve Greeley in the competition in Patty's absence to stall for time. Henry ultimately picks Eve as the contest winner and offers Pop a job as a dancing coach. Meanwhile, Pug proposes to Patty.

== Cast ==
- Lana Turner as Patty Marlow
- Richard Carlson as Michael "Pug" Braddock
- Artie Shaw as himself
- Ann Rutherford as Eve Greeley
- Lee Bowman as Freddy Tobin
- Thurston Hall as Henry W. Workman
- Leon Errol as Sam "Pops" Marlow
- Roscoe Karns as Joe Drews
- Mary Field as Miss Jenny May
- Walter Kingsford as President Cavendish
- Mary Beth Hughes as "Toddy" Tobin
- June Preisser as "Ticky" James
- Monty Woolley as Professor Lange
- Chester Clute as Pee Wee
- Veronica Lake as woman on motorcycle (Note: Uncredited.)
- Dick Winslow as man on motorcycle
- Robert Walker as young boy

== Production ==
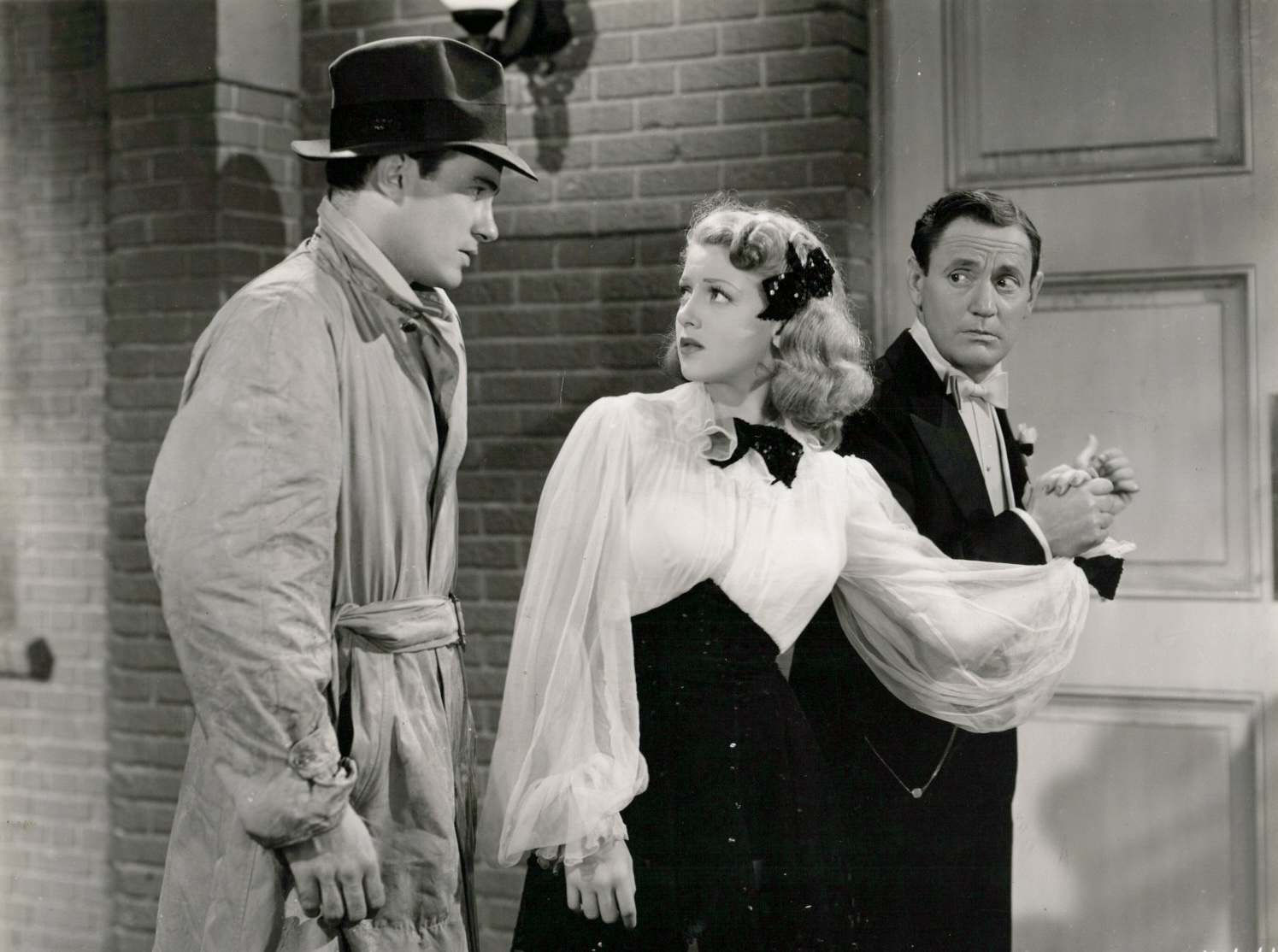
Robert Taylor, Lana Turner, and Roscoe Karns in Dancing Co-Ed

Dancing Co-Ed was adapted from a 1938 story by Albert Treynor published in American Magazine, which Metro-Goldwyn-Mayer originally purchased the rights to as a planned vehicle for Eleanor Powell. The project was shelved for approximately a year before producer Edgar Selwyn revived it, casting Lana Turner in the lead.

Stars Turner and Shaw were married shortly after making the film, but the marriage ended in divorce within four months.

== Release ==
Dancing Co-Ed was theatrically released in the United States on September 29, 1939.

=== Home media ===
The Warner Archive Collection released Dancing Co-Ed on DVD on August 23, 2010.

== Reception ==
=== Box office ===
According to MGM records the film earned $518,000 in the US and Canada and $195,000 elsewhere resulting in a profit of $21,000.

=== Critical response ===
Jimmie Fidler of The Daily Breeze praised the film as an "indirect indictment" of the Hollywood studio system, deeming it a "fine picture" and praising Turner's lead performance.

Variety favorably assessed the film, describing it as a "light and amusing comedy-drama... S. Sylvan Simon's direction is crisp, moving his story along at a good pace. Songs are chiefly confined to the Artie Shaw band's jive sessions, being his own arrangements of a flock of pops."

== Sources ==
- Morella, Joe; Epstein, Edward Z. (1971). Lana: The Public and Private Lives of Miss Turner. New York City, New York: Citadel Press. ISBN 0-8065-0226-6.
- Parish, James Robert (1978). The Hollywood Beauties. New York City, New York: Arlington House Publishers. ISBN 978-0-870-00412-4.
- Tucker, David C. (2021). S. Sylvan Simon, Moviemaker: Adventures with Lucy, Red Skelton and Harry Cohn in the Golden Age of Hollywood. Jefferson, North Carolina: McFarland & Company. ISBN 978-1-476-68219-8.
