= Noel Neill =

American actress (1920–2016)

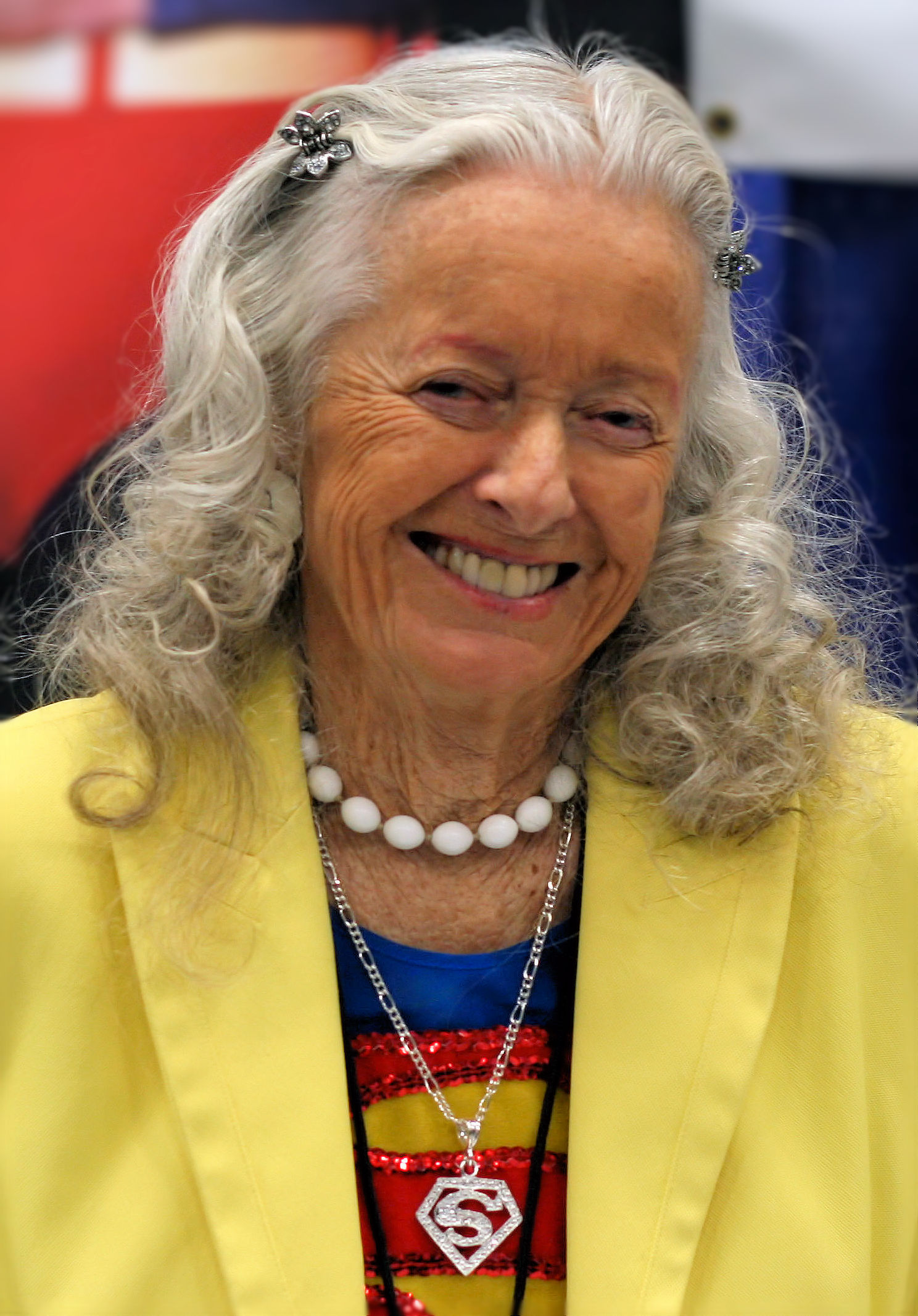
- Neill in February 2008
- Born: Noel Darleen Neill; November 25, 1920; Minneapolis, Minnesota, U.S.
- Died: July 3, 2016 (aged 95); Tucson, Arizona, U.S.
- Occupations: Actress; pin-up girl; model
- Years active: 1940–2016
- Known for: Lois Lane in Superman (1948), Atom Man vs. Superman (1950), and Adventures of Superman
- Spouses: Hal Lierley (m. 1943; ann. 1943) William Behrens (m. 1953; div. 1962) Joel Taylor (m. 1963; div. 1971)
- Awards: Inkpot Award (2008)

Noel Darleen Neill (November 25, 1920 – July 3, 2016) was an American actress, pin-up girl, and model. She played Lois Lane in the film serials Superman (1948) and Atom Man vs. Superman (1950), as well as the 1950s television series Adventures of Superman. She appeared in 80 films and television series in her career.

Following high school graduation in Minneapolis, Minnesota, Neill took up professional acting and modeling in the early 1940s before taking the role of Lois Lane. She later appeared in various productions of the Superman franchise. She was cast as the parent or another relative of the main character: Neill briefly appeared in the 1978 Superman feature film, the 1980s TV series Superboy and a featured cameo in the 2006 film Superman Returns.

== Early life ==
Noel Darleen Neill was born in Minneapolis, Minnesota, the daughter of journalist David Holland Neill, news editor of the Minneapolis Star Journal newspaper, and stage dancer Lavere Gorsboth. When she was 4 years old, her parents enrolled her at a school for aspiring performers. During her teen years, Neill danced, sang and even played the banjo at county fairs throughout the midwest. She attended Central High School in Minneapolis. When she graduated from high school in 1938, her first job was writing articles for Women's Wear Daily.

== Career ==
=== Early career ===
In her teens, Neill was a popular photographic model. While Betty Grable's pin-up was number one among GIs during World War II, Neill's was ranked number two. After she signed a contract with Paramount Pictures, it led to appearances in many of the studio's feature films and short subjects. In the mid-1940s, Neill had a leading role in one of Monogram Pictures' wayward-youth melodramas, and she became a familiar face in Monogram features for the next several years called Teen Agers, especially in the recurring role of Betty Rogers. She appeared in the last of the original Charlie Chan movies, Sky Dragon (1949), and also played damsels in distress in Monogram Westerns and Republic Pictures serials. Neill also appeared in a 1950 episode of The Lone Ranger. Neill sang with Bob Crosby and his orchestra. She also sang at the Del Mar Turf Club, which was owned by Bing Crosby.

=== Superman ===
Neill in Superman (1948)

In 1945, producer Sam Katzman gave Neill the recurring role of Betty Rogers, an aggressive reporter for a high-school newspaper, in his series of "Teen Agers" musical comedies, beginning with Junior Prom in 1946. When Katzman was casting his Superman serial for Columbia Pictures, he remembered Noel Neill's news-hawk portrayals and signed her to play Lois Lane. She played the role in the film serials Superman (1948) and Atom Man vs. Superman (1950), with Kirk Alyn portraying Superman/Clark Kent. Neill used what she saw in her father's workplace on her visits as a young girl to accurately portray a female reporter and regularly consulted with her father for further insight.

When Adventures of Superman came to television in 1951, veteran movie actors George Reeves and Phyllis Coates took the leading roles for the first season. By the time the series found a sponsor and a network time slot, Coates had committed herself to another production, so the producers called on Neill to reprise her role as Lois. She continued on the series for five seasons until it left the air in 1958. In 1954, she also appeared in Stamp Day for Superman which was produced by Superman Inc. for the United States Department of the Treasury to promote the purchase of U.S. Savings Bonds. It was only distributed in schools to educate children about the bond program. She was scheduled to appear in the seventh season with co-star Jack Larson in 1960, but after Reeves's tragic and sudden death, the seventh season was canceled, officially ending the show. While Phyllis Coates generally distanced herself from the role, Neill embraced her association with Lois Lane, giving frequent talks on college campuses during the 1970s, when interest in the series was revived, endearing herself to audiences with her warmth and humor.

Neill continued to appear in Superman-related productions. She originated the role of Lois Lane's mother, Ellen (alternatively, Ella) Lane, in a cameo for the 1978 film Superman, with Kirk Alyn as Lois's father, Sam Lane – as was the case in reverse with the role of Lois in 1951, Phyllis Coates would later succeed Neill in the role of Ella in Lois & Clark: The New Adventures of Superman; Lois & Clark star Teri Hatcher continued the tradition when she made a guest appearance on Smallville as Ella Lane. In an episode of the TV series Superboy, Neill appeared alongside her former castmate Jack Larson, who had played Jimmy Olsen on TV. Her personal appearance at the Metropolis, Illinois, Superman Festival was featured on The Tonight Show with Jay Leno. As "Aunt Lois", she made a guest appearance in the independent superhero film Surge of Power: The Stuff of Heroes, and she played Gertrude Vanderworth (the dying elderly wife of Lex Luthor) in the 2006 film Superman Returns.

Neill and Superman actor Jack Larson donated their time to record commentaries for the DVD releases of the Superman TV episodes. On the documentary Look, Up in the Sky: The Amazing Story of Superman, Neill remarked that a frequent question she would get from children was, "Why didn't you know that Clark Kent was Superman, just wearing a pair of those darn eyeglasses?" She replied to the children (and later to college audiences), "I don't want to lose my job!"

On June 15, 2010, the southern Illinois city of Metropolis unveiled a statue of Lois Lane. The Lois Lane statue is modeled on Noel Neill. Neill stated that she was honored to be memorialized with the statue.

== Legacy ==
=== Biography ===
In 2003, writer Larry Ward wrote an authorized biography of Neill, Truth, Justice, & The American Way: The Life And Times Of Noel Neill, The Original Lois Lane. A limited-edition, expanded version of the book was released in 2006. In 2007, Ward wrote another book on Neill, Beyond Lois Lane, which focused on the actress' other acting and modeling work.

=== Recognition ===
In 2004, Neill received a Golden Boot Award for her work in Western films.

=== Homage ===
In the third season episode "Midvale" of the Supergirl TV series in November 2017, Martian Manhunter disguises himself as Supergirl's mother Alura In-Ze (Erica Durance), taking the alias of Noel Neill in reference to Neill's and Durance's past portrayals of Lois Lane.

== Personal life ==
In 1943, Neill married makeup artist Harold Lierley in Hollywood, California. The marriage was annulled shortly afterward. Neill then married William Behrens in 1953 in Santa Monica, California; the marriage ended in divorce in 1962. While still married to Behrens, the Superman television program was cancelled. It was then that her acting career diminished and Neill became a homemaker, later working in the television department at United Artists. Following her divorce from Behrens, Neill married Joel Taylor. The marriage lasted seven years and ended with the couple divorcing in 1971.

A fall at her Tucson, Arizona, home in 2010 resulted in Neill suffering from a hip fracture. She was hospitalized following surgery to repair the fracture at Tucson Medical Center.

== Death ==
Following an extended illness, Neill died in Tucson on July 3, 2016, at age 95. Her publicist and biographer, Larry Ward, paid tribute to her role as Lois Lane, as did actor Mark Hamill. Neill had no immediate surviving family members.

== Filmography ==
- Mad Youth (1940) - Teenager (uncredited)
- Henry Aldrich for President (1941) - Student (uncredited)
- Miss Polly (1941) - School Girl (uncredited)
- The Remarkable Andrew (1942) - Congratulatory Girl in Courtroom (uncredited)
- She's in the Army (1942) - WAC Enlistee (uncredited)
- Miss Annie Rooney (1942) - Marty's Party Guest (uncredited)
- Henry and Dizzy (1942) - Jean
- Salute for Three (1943) - Gracie O'Connor
- Prairie Chickens (1943) - Girl on Bus Tour (uncredited)
- Lady of Burlesque (1943) - (uncredited)
- Young Ideas (1943) - Co-ed (uncredited)
- Let's Face It (1943) - Chorus Girl (uncredited)
- Standing Room Only (1944) - Secretary (uncredited)
- They Are Guilty (1944)
- Henry Aldrich's Little Secret (1944) - Daisy
- Fun Time (1944, short) - Flora Daley
- Are These Our Parents? (1944) - Terry Salisbury
- Our Hearts Were Young and Gay (1944) - Girl (uncredited)
- Rainbow Island (1944) - Lona's Companion (uncredited)
- Here Come the Waves (1944) - Dorothy
- Bring on the Girls (1945) - Cigarette Girl (uncredited)
- You Hit the Spot (1945, Short) - Muriel / Echo
- Duffy's Tavern (1945) - School Kid (uncredited)
- The Stork Club (1945) - Jacqueline Billingsley (uncredited)
- The Blue Dahlia (1946) - Nolie - Hatcheck Girl (uncredited)
- The Well-Groomed Bride (1946) - WAVE (uncredited)
- Junior Prom (1946) - Betty Rogers
- College Queen (1946, short) - Cindy Harris, College Queen
- Freddie Steps Out (1946) - Betty Rogers
- High School Hero (1946) - Betty Rogers
- Vacation Days (1947) - Betty Rogers
- Over the Santa Fe Trail (1947) - Taffy Neill
- Smash-Up: The Story of a Woman (1947) - Girl at Party (uncredited)
- Sarge Goes to College (1947) - Betty Rogers
- The Hal Roach Comedy Carnival (1947) - Courtroom Spectator, in 'Fabulous Joe'
- The Fabulous Joe (1947) - Courtroom Spectator (uncredited)
- Brick Bradford (1947) - Lula - Native Girl (uncredited)
- Smart Politics (1948) - Betty Rogers
- Man or Mouse (1948, short) - Sue Jones, Hercules' Daughter
- Night Club Girl (1948) - Gertrude
- The Big Clock (1948) - Elevator Operator (uncredited)
- Are You with It? (1948) - Terry
- Campus Sleuth (1948) - Betty Rogers
- Superman (1948) - Lois Lane
- Beyond Glory (1948) - Party Girl (uncredited)
- Music Man (1948) - Kitty
- Adventures of Frank and Jesse James (1948) - Judy Powell
- When My Baby Smiles at Me (1948) - Chorus Girl (uncredited)
- Gun Runner (1949) - Jessica Harris
- The Cactus Cut-Up (1949, short) - Errol's Daughter
- Son of a Badman (1949) - Vicki Burley
- The Sky Dragon (1949) - Jane Marshall
- Forgotten Women (1949) - Ellen Reid
- The James Brothers of Missouri (1949) - Peg Royer
- Red, Hot and Blue (1949) - Actress in Theatre Group (uncredited)
- Atom Man vs. Superman (1950) - Lois Lane
- The Cisco Kid (1950, TV series) - Rita Shannon (S1/Ep7 - "Chain Lightning")
- The Lone Ranger (1951, TV series) - Molly Niles (S2/Ep17 - "Letter of the Law")
- Abilene Trail (1951) - Mary Dawson
- An American in Paris (1951) - American Girl (uncredited)
- Whistling Hills (1951) - Beth Fairchild
- Submarine Command (1951) - Mrs. Sue Carlson (uncredited)
- Fireside Theatre (1951, TV series)
- The Greatest Show on Earth (1952) - Noel (uncredited)
- Racket Squad (1952, TV series) - Peggy Dawson
- Montana Incident (1952) - Frances Martin
- Invasion U.S.A. (1952) - Second Airline Ticket Agent
- Gentlemen Prefer Blondes (1953) - Passenger (uncredited)
- Adventures of Superman (1953-1958, TV series) - Lois Lane
- Stamp Day for Superman (1954, short) - Lois Lane
- Public Defender (1954, TV series) - Betty
- The Lawless Rider (1954) - Nancy James
- Superman (1978) - Ella Lane (uncredited)
- Couch Potatoes (1989, TV series) - MailShell
- Superboy (1991, TV series) - Alexis
- Hindsight Is 20/20... (2004, short) - Tourist (uncredited)
- Surge of Power: The Stuff of Heroes (2004) - Aunt Lois
- Superman Returns (2006) - Gertrude Vanderworth
- Superman and the Secret Planet (2013) - Lois Lane
- Surge of Power: Revenge of the Sequel (2016) - Aunt Lois Williamson (final film role)
