= Freddie Steps Out =

1946 film by Arthur Dreifuss

- Directed by: Arthur Dreifuss
- Written by: Hal Collins; Arthur Dreifuss
- Produced by: Sam Katzman
- Starring: Freddie Stewart; June Preisser
- Cinematography: Ira H. Morgan
- Production company: Monogram Pictures
- Distributed by: Monogram Pictures
- Release date: June 29, 1946
- Running time: 72 minutes
- Country: United States
- Language: English

Freddie Steps Out is a 1946 American film starring Freddie Stewart.

It is the second in The Teen Agers series.

== Plot ==
Freddie Trimball is a high school student. He happens to bear an amazing resemblance to Frankie Troy, one of the most popular young singers in the country.

Tired of working and tired of being pursued by bobby-soxers and other fans, Frankie tells his managers he needs a break. They try to discourage him while Freddie's classmates come up with a hoax, claiming that "Frankie" has gone back to school. Mix-up after mix-up follows, with Freddie's girlfriend, Dodie Rogers, every bit as confused as Frankie's wife, who has a baby. It all comes to a head when Frankie ends up singing in a school show.

== Cast ==
- Freddie Stewart as Freddie / Frankie
- June Preisser as Dodie
- Jackie Moran as Jimmy
- Noel Neill as Betty
- Frankie Darro as Roy
