= The Barefoot Boy =

Poem by John Greenleaf Whittier

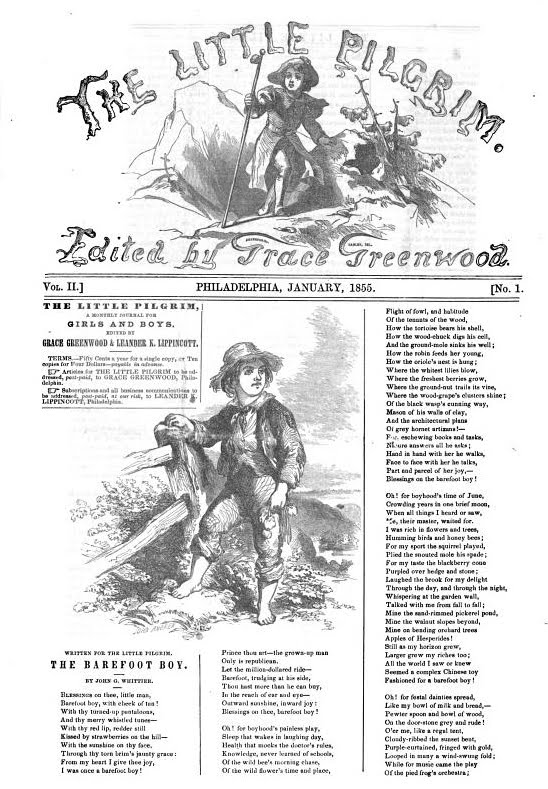
First page of "The Barefoot Boy", as it first appeared in January 1855

"The Barefoot Boy" is a poem written by American Quaker poet John Greenleaf Whittier. The poem was first published in The Little Pilgrim in January 1855.

== Overview ==
The poem is about a barefoot boy who is both innocent and connected to nature. Nature and innocence are both compared to the world of adults, in which adults have to try to stand out in endless struggles to stand out. The boy is barefoot because the shoes are used to symbolize being further away from nature. In one of the verses, a man is referred to as a republican while the boy is referred to as a prince. The poet explains that the man has money while the boy has the world of learning. The poem celebrates a humble, plain person, much as Whittier's contemporary Henry Wadsworth Longfellow does in his earlier poem "The Village Blacksmith". Modern scholar Karen L. Kilcup notes that "The Barefoot Boy" confirmed Whittier as a poet interested in idyllic rural life. Angela Sorby notes the poem is "a late-romantic dialogue between a corrupted adult speaker and his uncorrupted younger self".

== Reception ==
Cornelius Conway Felton, a Greek professor at Harvard College, was personally moved by the poem. As he wrote in a letter to Whittier dated June 26, 1856, "The sensations and memories it called up were delicious as a shower in summer afternoon; and I forgot the intervening years, forgot Latin and Greek — forgot boots and shoes and long-tailed and broad-tailed coats — and revelled again in the days and delights of jacket-hood, torn hat-hood and barefoot-hood."
