= List of Western films 1950–1954 =

H

A list of Western films released from 1950 to 1954.

Title	Director	Cast	Country	Subgenre/Notes
1950
Across the Badlands	Fred F. Sears	Charles Starrett, Smiley Burnette	United States	B Western
Ambush	Sam Wood	Robert Taylor, John Hodiak, Arlene Dahl, Don Taylor, Jean Hagen, Bruce Cowling, Leon Ames, John McIntire, Pat Moriarity, Charles Stevens, Chief Thundercloud, Ray Teal	United States	traditional Western
Annie Get Your Gun	George Sidney	Betty Hutton, Howard Keel, Louis Calhern, Keenan Wynn, Benay Venuta, J. Carrol Naish, Edward Arnold, Clinton Sundberg, Evelyn Beresford, John War Eagle, Chief Yowlachie	United States	musical Western
The Arizona Cowboy	R.G. Springsteen	Rex Allen	United States	Singing cowboy Western
Arizona Territory	Wallace Fox	Whip Wilson, Andy Clyde	United States	B Western
The Bandit Queen	William Berke	Barbara Britton, Willard Parker, Phillip Reed	United States	B Western
The Baron of Arizona	Samuel Fuller	Vincent Price, Ellen Drew	United States	traditional Western
Barricade	Peter Godfrey	Dane Clark, Raymond Massey, Ruth Roman, Robert Douglas, Morgan Farley, Walter Coy, George Stern, Robert Griffin, Frank Marlowe, Tony Martínez	United States	B Western
Battling Marshal	Oliver Drake	Sunset Carson	United States	Sunset Carson serial Western (last of the series)
Bells of Coronado	William Witney	Roy Rogers, Dale Evans, Pat Brady, Grant Withers, Leo Cleary, Clifton Young, Robert Bice, Stuart Randall, John Hamilton, Edmund Cobb, Eddie Lee, Rex Lease, Lane Bradford, Foy Willing, Riders of the Purple Sage	United States	Singing cowboy Western
Beyond the Purple Hills	John English	Gene Autry	United States	Singing cowboy Western
The Blazing Sun	John English	Gene Autry	United States	Singing cowboy Western
Border Outlaws	Richard Talmadge	Spade Cooley	United States	Singing cowboy Western
Border Rangers	William Berke	Don "Red" Barry, Robert Lowery, Wally Vernon	United States	B Western
Border Treasure	George Archainbaud	Tim Holt, Jane Nigh	United States	B Western
Branded	Rudolph Maté	Alan Ladd, Mona Freeman, Charles Bickford, Robert Keith, Tom Tully, Milburn Stone	United States	traditional Western
Bright Leaf	Michael Curtiz	Gary Cooper, Lauren Bacall, Patricia Neal	United States	dramatic Western
Broken Arrow	Delmer Daves	James Stewart, Jeff Chandler, Debra Paget, Basil Ruysdael, Will Geer, Arthur Hunnicutt, Jay Silverheels, John Doucette	United States	revisionist Western
California Passage	Joseph Kane	Forrest Tucker, Adele Mara	United States	traditional Western
Call of the Klondike	Frank McDonald	Kirby Grant	United States	B Western
The Capture	John Sturges	Lew Ayres, Teresa Wright	United States	traditional Western
The Cariboo Trail	Edwin L. Marin	Randolph Scott, Gabby Hayes, Bill Williams, Karin Booth, Victor Jory, Douglas Kennedy, Jim Davis, Dale Robertson, Mary Stuart, James Griffith, Lee Tung Foo, Cliff Clark, Tom Monroe, Dorothy Adams	United States	traditional Western
Cherokee Uprising	Lewis D. Collins	Whip Wilson, Andy Clyde	United States	B Western
Code of the Silver Sage	Fred C. Brannon	Allan Lane	United States	B Western
Cody of the Pony Express	Spencer Gordon Bennet	Dickie Moore	United States	serial Western
Colorado Ranger	Thomas Carr	James Ellison, Russell Hayden	United States	B Western
Colt .45	Edwin L. Marin	Randolph Scott, Ruth Roman, Zachary Scott, Lloyd Bridges, Alan Hale Sr., Ian MacDonald, Chief Thundercloud, Luther Crockett, Walter Coy, Charles Evans, Carl Andre	United States	traditional Western
Comanche Territory	George Sherman	Maureen O'Hara, Macdonald Carey, Will Geer, Charles Drake, Pedro de Cordoba, Rick Vallin, Parley Baer, James Best, Edmund Cobb	United States	traditional Western
Copper Canyon	John Farrow	Ray Milland, Hedy Lamarr, Macdonald Carey, Mona Freeman, Harry Carey Jr.	United States	traditional Western
Covered Wagon Raid	R.G. Springsteen	Allan Lane	United States	B Western
Cow Town	John English	Gene Autry	United States	Singing cowboy Western
Crooked River	Thomas Carr	James Ellison, Russell Hayden	United States	B Western
Curtain Call at Cactus Creek	Charles Lamont	Donald O'Connor, Gale Storm, Walter Brennan	United States	comedy Western
Dakota Lil	Lesley Selander	George Montgomery, Rod Cameron, Marie Windsor	United States	B Western
Dallas	Stuart Heisler	Gary Cooper, Ruth Roman, Steve Cochran, Raymond Massey, Barbara Payton, Leif Erickson, Antonio Moreno, Jerome Cowan, Reed Hadley	United States	traditional Western
The Daltons' Women	Thomas Carr	Lash LaRue, Al St. John, Jack Holt	United States	Lash LaRue serial Western
Davy Crockett, Indian Scout	Lew Landers	George Montgomery, Ellen Drew, Chief Thundercloud	United States	B Western
Desperadoes of the West	Fred C. Brannon	Richard Powers, Judy Clark	United States	serial Western
Devil's Doorway	Anthony Mann	Robert Taylor, Louis Calhern, Paula Raymond, Marshall Thompson, James Mitchell, Edgar Buchanan, Rhys Williams, Spring Byington, James Millican, Bruce Cowling, Fritz Leiber	United States	psychological Western
Dynamite Pass	Lew Landers	Tim Holt	United States	B Western
The Eagle and the Hawk	Lewis R. Foster	John Payne, Rhonda Fleming, Dennis O'Keefe, Thomas Gomez, Fred Clark, Frank Faylen, Eduardo Noriega, Grandon Rhodes, Walter Reed	United States	B Western
Fancy Pants	George Marshall	Bob Hope, Lucille Ball, Bruce Cabot, Jack Kirkwood, Lea Penman, Hugh French, Eric Blore, Joseph Vitale, John Alexander, Norma Varden, Virginia Keiley, Colin Keith-Johnston, Joe Wong	United States	comedy Western
The Fargo Phantom	Will Cowan	Tex Williams	United States	Singing cowboy Western
Fast on the Draw	Thomas Carr	James Ellison, Russell Hayden	United States	B Western
Fence Riders	Wallace Fox	Whip Wilson, Andy Clyde	United States	B Western
The Fighting Stallion	Robert Emmett Tansey	Bill Edwards, Doris Merrick	United States	B Western
Frenchie	Louis King	Joel McCrea, Shelley Winters, Paul Kelly, Elsa Lanchester, Marie Windsor, John Russell, John Emery, George Cleveland, Regis Toomey	United States	traditional Western
Frisco Tornado	R.G. Springsteen	Allan Lane	United States	B Western
Frontier Outpost	Ray Nazarro	Charles Starrett, Smiley Burnette, Lois Hall	United States	B Western
The Furies	Anthony Mann	Barbara Stanwyck, Wendell Corey, Walter Huston, Judith Anderson, Gilbert Roland, Thomas Gomez, Beulah Bondi, Pepe Hern, Albert Dekker, John Bromfield, Wallace Ford, Blanche Yurka, Louis Jean Heydt, Frank Ferguson, Myrna Dell	United States	psychological Western
The Girl from San Lorenzo	Derwin Abrahams	Duncan Renaldo, Leo Carrillo, Jane Adams	United States	The Cisco Kid serial Western—last of the entire series
The Gunfighter	Henry King	Gregory Peck, Helen Westcott, Millard Mitchell, Jean Parker, Karl Malden, Richard Jaeckel, Skip Homeier, Kim Spalding, Anthony Ross, Verna Felton, Ellen Corby, David Clarke, Alan Hale Jr.	United States	outlaw Western
Gunfire	William Berke	Don "Red" Barry, Robert Lowery	United States	B Western
Gunmen of Abilene	Fred C. Brannon	Allan Lane	United States	B Western
Gunmen of The Pecos	Corey Cook	Cal Shrum, Alta Lee, Pappy Hoag, J.P. Smith, Charlie Broam, Jake Lujan, Rhythm Rangers swing band	Mexico	indep. B Western
Gunslingers	Wallace Fox	Whip Wilson, Andy Clyde	United States	B Western
High Lonesome	Alan Le May	John Barrymore Jr., Chill Wills, John Archer, Lois Butler, Kristine Miller, Basil Ruysdael, Jack Elam	United States	B Western
Hills of Oklahoma	R.G. Springsteen	Rex Allen	United States	Singing cowboy Western
Hoedown	Ray Nazarro	Eddy Arnold, Jock Mahoney	United States	Singing cowboy/musical review Western
Hostile Country	Thomas Carr	James Ellison, Russell Hayden	United States	B Western
Hurricane at Pilgrim Hill	Richard L. Bare	Clem Bevans, Cecil Kellaway, Virginia Grey	United States	comedy Western
I Killed Geronimo	John Hoffman	James Ellison, Virginia Herrick, Chief Thundercloud	United States	B Western
I Shot Billy the Kid	William Berke	Don "Red" Barry, Robert Lowery	United States	B Western
Indian Territory	John English	Gene Autry	United States	Singing cowboy Western
The Iroquois Trail	Phil Karlson	George Montgomery, Brenda Marshall	United States	colonial Western
Jiggs and Maggie Out West	William Beaudine	Joe Yule, Renie Riano	United States	comedy Western
The Kangaroo Kid	Lesley Selander	Jock Mahoney, Veda Ann Borg, Martha Hyer	Australia; United Kingdom	Australian Western
Kansas Raiders	Ray Enright	Audie Murphy, Brian Donlevy, Marguerite Chapman, Scott Brady, Tony Curtis, Richard Arlen, Richard Long, James Best, John Kellogg, Dewey Martin, George Chandler, Charles Delaney, Richard Egan, David Wolfe	United States	B Western
The Kid from Gower Gulch	Oliver Drake	Spade Cooley	United States	Singing cowboy Western
The Kid from Texas	Kurt Neumann	Audie Murphy, Gale Storm, Albert Dekker, Shepperd Strudwick, Will Geer, William Talman, Martin Garralaga, Robert H. Barrat, Walter Sande, Frank Wilcox, Dennis Hoey, Ray Teal, Don Haggerty, Paul Ford, Harold Goodwin. Zon Murray, Rosa Turich	United States	B Western
King of the Bullwhip	Ron Ormond	Lash LaRue, Al St. John, Jack Holt	United States	Lash LaRue serial Western
Law of the Panhandle	Lewis D. Collins	Johnny Mack Brown	United States	B Western
Lightning Guns	Fred F. Sears	Charles Starrett, Smiley Burnette, Gloria Henry	United States	B Western
Marshal of Heldorado	Thomas Carr	James Ellison, Russell Hayden	United States	B Western
The Missourians	George Blair	Roy Barcroft	United States	B Western
Montana	Ray Enright	Errol Flynn, Alexis Smith, Douglas Kennedy, Ian MacDonald, Lester Matthews, Lane Chandler	United States	traditional Western
Mule Train	John English	Gene Autry	United States	Singing cowboy Western
The Nevadan	Gordon Douglas	Randolph Scott, Dorothy Malone, Forrest Tucker, Frank Faylen, George Macready, Charles Kemper, Jeff Corey, Tom Powers, Jock Mahoney	United States	traditional Western
Never a Dull Moment	George Marshall	Irene Dunne, Fred MacMurray	United States	comedy Western
North of the Great Divide	William Witney	Roy Rogers	United States	Singing cowboy Western
The Old Frontier	Philip Ford	Monte Hale, Paul Hurst	United States	B Western
Outcast of Black Mesa	Ray Nazarro	Charles Starrett, Smiley Burnette, Martha Hyer	United States	B Western
Outlaw Gold	Wallace Fox	Johnny Mack Brown, Jane Adams	United States	B Western
Outlaws of Texas	Thomas Carr	Whip Wilson, Andy Clyde	United States	B Western
The Outriders	Roy Rowland	Joel McCrea, Barry Sullivan, Arlene Dahl, James Whitmore, Claude Jarman Jr., Ramon Novarro, Jeff Corey	United States	traditional Western
Over the Border	Wallace Fox	Johnny Mack Brown, Wendy Waldron	United States	B Western
The Palomino	Ray Nazarro	Jerome Courtland, Beverly Tyler, Joseph Calleia, Roy Roberts	United States	traditional Western
Pancho Villa Returns	Miguel Contreras Torres	Leo Carrillo, Esther Fernández, Rodolfo Acosta	Mexico	B Western
Raiders of Tomahawk Creek	Fred F. Sears	Charles Starrett, Smiley Burnette, Kay Buckley	United States	B Western
Redwood Forest Trail	Philip Ford	Rex Allen, Carl Switzer	United States	Singing cowboy Western
Return of the Frontiersman	Richard L. Bare	Gordon MacRae, Julie London, Rory Calhoun, Jack Holt, Fred Clark, Raymond Bond, John Doucette, Matt McHugh, Britt Wood, Dan White	United States	traditional Western
The Return of Jesse James	Arthur Hilton	John Ireland, Ann Dvorak, Henry Hull	United States	traditional Western
Rider from Tucson	Lesley Selander	Tim Holt, Elaine Riley	United States	B Western
Rio Grande	John Ford	John Wayne, Maureen O'Hara, Ben Johnson, Claude Jarman Jr., Harry Carey Jr., Chill Wills, J. Carrol Naish, Victor McLaglen, Grant Withers, Sons of the Pioneers, Peter Ortiz, Steve Pendleton, Karolyn Grimes, Albert Morin, Stan Jones	United States	cavalry Western
Rock Island Trail	Joseph Kane	Forrest Tucker, Adele Mara, Bruce Cabot	United States	B Western
Rocky Mountain	William Keighley	Errol Flynn, Patrice Wymore, Scott Forbes, Guinn Williams, Dick Jones, Howard Petrie, Slim Pickens, Chubby Johnson, Sheb Wooley	United States	traditional Western
Saddle Tramp	Hugo Fregonese	Joel McCrea, Wanda Hendrix, John Russell, John McIntire, Jeanette Nolan, Russell Simpson, Ed Begley, Jimmy Hunt, Gordon Gebert, Antonio Moreno, John Ridgely, Walter Coy, Peter Leeds, Paul Picerni	United States	traditional Western
Salt Lake Raiders	Fred C. Brannon	Allan Lane, Martha Hyer	United States	B Western
The Savage Horde	Joseph Kane	Bill Elliott, Lorna Gray	United States	traditional Western
Short Grass	Lesley Selander	Rod Cameron, Cathy Downs, Johnny Mack Brown, Raymond Walburn, Alan Hale Jr., Morris Ankrum, Jonathan Hale, Harry Woods, Marlo Dwyer, Riley Hill, Jeff York, Stanley Andrews, Jack Ingram, Lee Tung Foo	United States	traditional Western
The Showdown	Dorrell McGowan, Stuart E. McGowan	William Elliott, Walter Brennan, Marie Windsor, Henry Morgan, Rhys Williams, Jim Davis, William Ching, Leif Erickson, Henry Rowland, Charles Stevens, Victor Kilian, Yakima Canutt, William Steele	United States	traditional Western
Sierra	Alfred E. Green	Wanda Hendrix, Audie Murphy, Burl Ives, Dean Jagger, Richard Rober, Anthony Curtis, Houseley Stevenson, Elliott Reid, Griff Barnett, Elisabeth Risdon, Roy Roberts, Sara Allgood, Erskine Sanford, John Doucette, Jim Arness, I. Stanford Jolley, Jack Ingram	United States	B Western
Sierra Passage	Frank McDonald	Wayne Morris, Lola Albright	United States	traditional Western
Silver Raiders	Wallace Fox	Whip Wilson, Andy Clyde, Virginia Herrick	United States	B Western
Singing Guns	R.G. Springsteen	Vaughn Monroe, Ward Bond, Ella Raines, Walter Brennan, Jeff Corey, Barry Kelley, Harry Shannon, Tom Fadden, Ralph Dunn, Rex Lease, George Chandler, Billy Gray, Jimmie Dodd	United States	traditional Western
Snow Dog	Frank McDonald	Kirby Grant, Elena Verdugo	United States	family Western
Stage to Tucson	Ralph Murphy	Rod Cameron, Wayne Morris	United States	traditional Western
Stars in My Crown	Jacques Tourneur	Joel McCrea, Ellen Drew, Dean Stockwell, Juano Hernandez, Alan Hale Sr., Lewis Stone, James Mitchell, Amanda Blake, Charles Kemper, Connie Gilchrist, Ed Begley, Jack Lambert, Arthur Hunnicutt, James Arness	United States	traditional Western
Streets of Ghost Town	Ray Nazarro	Charles Starrett, Smiley Burnette, Mary Ellen Kay	United States	B Western
Storm over Wyoming	Lesley Selander	Tim Holt, Noreen Nash	United States	B Western
The Sundowners	George Templeton	Robert Preston, Robert Sterling, Chill Wills, Cathy Downs, John Litel, Jack Elam, Don Haggerty, Stanley Price, Frank Cordell, John Drew Barrymore	United States	traditional Western
Sunset in the West	William Witney	Roy Rogers	United States	Singing cowboy Western
Surrender	Allan Dwan	Vera Ralston, John Carroll, Walter Brennan, Francis Lederer, William Ching, Maria Palmer, Jane Darwell, Roy Barcroft, Paul Fix, Esther Dale, Edward Norris, Howland Chamberlain, Norman Budd, Jeff York, Mickey Simpson	United States	traditional Western
The Texan Meets Calamity Jane	Ande Lamb	Evelyn Ankers, James Ellison, Jack Elam, Ruth Whitney, Jack Ingram	United States	traditional Western
Texas Dynamo	Ray Nazarro	Charles Starrett, Smiley Burnette, Jock Mahoney	United States	B Western
A Ticket to Tomahawk	Richard Sale	Dan Dailey, Anne Baxter, Rory Calhoun, Walter Brennan, Marilyn Monroe, Charles Kemper, Connie Gilchrist, Arthur Hunnicutt, Will Wright, Chief Yowlachie, Victor Sen Yung	United States	comedy Western
Trail of Robin Hood	William Witney	Roy Rogers, Rex Allen	United States	Singing cowboy Western
Trail of the Rustlers	Ray Nazarro	Charles Starrett, Smiley Burnette, Gail Davis	United States	B Western
The Traveling Saleswoman	Charles Reisner	Joan Davis, Andy Devine	United States	comedy Western
Trigger, Jr.	William Witney	Roy Rogers, Dale Evans	United States	Singing cowboy Western
Twilight in the Sierras	William Witney	Roy Rogers, Dale Evans	United States	Singing cowboy Western
Two Flags West	Robert Wise	Joseph Cotten, Linda Darnell, Jeff Chandler, Cornel Wilde, Dale Robertson, Jay C. Flippen, Noah Beery, Harry von Zell, John Sands, Arthur Hunnicutt	United States	cavalry Western
Under Mexicali Stars	George Blair	Rex Allen	United States	Singing cowboy Western
Wagon Master	John Ford	Ben Johnson, Harry Carey Jr., Ward Bond, Joanne Dru, Charles Kemper, Alan Mowbray, Jane Darwell, Hank Worden, Movita Castaneda, Ruth Clifford, Russell Simpson, Kathleen O'Malley, Mickey Simpson, Cliff Lyons	United States	traditional Western
Winchester '73	Anthony Mann	James Stewart, Shelley Winters, Dan Duryea, Stephen McNally, Millard Mitchell, Charles Drake, John McIntire, Will Geer, Jay C. Flippen, Rock Hudson, John Alexander, Steve Brodie, James Millican, Abner Biberman, Anthony Curtis, James Best	United States	psychological Western
Wyoming Mail	Reginald LeBorg	Stephen McNally, Alexis Smith, Howard Da Silva, Ed Begley, Dan Riss, Roy Roberts, Armando Silvestre, Whit Bissell, James Arness, Richard Jaeckel, Frankie Darro, Felipe Turich, Richard Egan, Gene Evans, Frank Fenton, Emerson Treacy	United States	traditional Western
Young Daniel Boone	Reginald LeBorg	David Bruce, Kristine Miller	United States	biographical Western
1951
Abilene Trail	Lewis D. Collins	Whip Wilson, Andy Clyde	United States	B Western
Across the Wide Missouri	William A. Wellman	Clark Gable, Ricardo Montalbán, John Hodiak, Adolphe Menjou, J. Carrol Naish, Jack Holt, Alan Napier, George Chandler, Richard Anderson, María Elena Marqués, Howard Keel, James Whitmore, Chief Tahachee, Nipo T. Strongheart, Evelyn Finley, Bobby Barber, Timothy Carey	United States	traditional Western
Al Jennings of Oklahoma	Ray Nazarro	Dan Duryea, Gale Storm, Dick Foran, Gloria Henry, Guinn 'Big Boy' Williams, Raymond Greenleaf, Stanley Andrews, John Ridgely, James Millican, Harry Shannon	United States	traditional Western
Along the Great Divide	Raoul Walsh	Kirk Douglas, Virginia Mayo, John Agar, Walter Brennan, Ray Teal, Hugh Sanders, Morris Ankrum, James Anderson, Charles Meredith	United States	traditional Western
Apache Drums	Hugo Fregonese	Stephen McNally, Coleen Gray	United States	traditional Western
Arizona Manhunt	Fred C. Brannon	Michael Chapin, Eilene Janssen	United States	B Western
Badman's Gold	Robert Emmett Tansey	Johnny Carpenter, Alyn Lockwood	United States	B Western
Belle Le Grand	Allan Dwan	Vera Ralston, John Carroll, William Ching, Hope Emerson, Grant Withers, John Qualen, Harry Morgan, Thurston Hall, Marietta Canty, Glen Vernon, Emory Parnell	United States	B Western
Best of the Badmen	William D. Russell	Robert Ryan, Claire Trevor, Jack Buetel, Robert Preston, Walter Brennan, Bruce Cabot, John Archer, Lawrence Tierney, Barton MacLane, Tom Tyler, Robert J. Wilke, John Cliff, Lee MacGregor, Emmett Lynn, Carleton Young	United States	traditional Western
Blazing Bullets	Wallace Fox	Johnny Mack Brown, Lois Hall	United States	B Western
Bonanza Town	Fred F. Sears	Charles Starrett, Fred F. Sears, Smiley Burnette	United States	B Western
Border Fence	H.W. Kier, Norman Sheldon	Walt Wayne, Lee Morgan	United States	B Western
Buckaroo Sheriff of Texas	Philip Ford	Michael Chapin, Eilene Janssen	United States	B Western
Callaway Went Thataway	Melvin Frank, Norman Panama	Fred MacMurray, Dorothy McGuire, Howard Keel, Jesse White, Fay Roope, Natalie Schafer, Douglas Kennedy, Elisabeth Fraser, John Indrisano, Stan Freberg, Don Haggerty, Clark Gable, Elizabeth Taylor, Esther Williams	United States	comedy Western
Canyon Raiders	Lewis D. Collins	Whip Wilson	United States	B Western
Cattle Drive	Kurt Neumann	Joel McCrea, Deab Stockwell, Chill Wills	United States	traditional Western
Cattle Queen	Robert Emmett Tansey	Maria Hart, Drake Smith, William Fawcett	United States	traditional Western
Cavalry Scout	Lesley Selander	Rod Cameron, Audrey Long, Jim Davis, James Millican, James Arness, John Doucette, William 'Bill' Phillips, Stephen Chase, Rory Mallinson, Eddy Waller, Frank Wilcox, Cliff Clark	United States	cavalry Western
Cave of Outlaws	William Castle	Macdonald Carey, Alexis Smith, Edgar Buchanan, Victor Jory, Hugh O'Brian, Houseley Stevenson, Hugh Sanders, Raymond Bond, Robert Osterloh	United States	B Western
Colorado Ambush	Lewis D. Collins	Johnny Mack Brown	United States	B Western
Cyclone Fury	Ray Nazarro	Charles Starrett, Smiley Burnette, Fred F. Sears	United States	B Western
The Dakota Kid	Philip Ford	Michael Chapin, Eilene Janssen	United States	B Western
Desert of Lost Men	Harry Keller	Allan Lane	United States	B Western
Distant Drums	Raoul Walsh	Gary Cooper, Mari Aldon, Richard Webb, Arthur Hunnicutt, Carl Harbaugh, Ray Teal, Robert Barrat	United States	Florida Western
Don Daredevil Rides Again	Fred C. Brannon	Ken Curtis	United States	serial Western
Drums in the Deep South	William Cameron Menzies	James Craig, Barbara Payton, Guy Madison	United States	traditional Western
Fort Defiance	John Rawlins	Dane Clark, Ben Johnson, Peter Graves, Tracey Roberts, George Cleveland, Ralph Sanford, Iron Eyes Cody, Dennis Moore, Craig Woods, Dick Elliott	United States	B Western
Fort Dodge Stampede	Harry Keller	Allan Lane	United States	B Western
Fort Savage Raiders	Ray Nazarro	Charles Starrett, Smiley Burnette, Peter M. Thompson	United States	B Western
Fort Worth	Edwin L. Marin	Randolph Scott, David Brian, Phyllis Thaxter, Helena Carter, Dickie Jones, Ray Teal, Michael Tolan, Emerson Treacy, Bob Steele, Walter Sande, Chubby Johnson	United States	traditional Western
Gene Autry and the Mounties	John English	Gene Autry, Elena Verdugo, Carleton Young, Richard Emory, Herbert Rawlinson, Trevor Bardette	United States	Singing cowboy Western
The Glenrowan Affair	Rupert Kathner	Bob Chitty	Australia	Outback Western
Golden Girl	Lloyd Bacon	Mitzi Gaynor, Dale Robertson, Dennis Day, James Barton	United States	Traditional Western
Gold Raiders	Edward Bernds	George O'Brien, Moe Howard, Larry Fine, Shemp Howard	United States	comedy Western
The Great Missouri Raid	Gordon Douglas	Wendell Corey, Macdonald Carey, Ellen Drew, Ward Bond, Bruce Bennett, Bill Williams, Anne Revere, Edgar Buchanan, Louis Jean Heydt, Barry Kelley, James Millican, Paul Lees, Guy Wilkerson, Ethan Laidlaw, Tom Tyler, Steve Pendleton, Robert Bray, Paul Fix, James Griffith, Robert Osterloh, Whit Bissell	United States	traditional Western
Gunplay	Lesley Selander	Tim Holt, Joan Dixon	United States	B Western
Heart of the Rockies	William Witney	Roy Rogers	United States	Singing cowboy Western
The Hills of Utah	John English	Gene Autry	United States	Singing cowboy Western
Hot Lead	Stuart Gilmore	Tim Holt, Joan Dixon	United States	B Western
In Old Amarillo	William Witney	Roy Rogers	United States	Singing cowboy Western
Inside Straight	Gerald Mayer	David Brian, Mercedes McCambridge, Barry Sullivan, Arlene Dahl, Paula Raymond, Lon Chaney Jr., John Considine	United States	traditional Western
The Kid from Amarillo	Ray Nazarro	Charles Starrett, Smiley Burnette, Fred F. Sears	United States	B Western
The Lady from Texas	Joseph Pevney	Howard Duff, Mona Freeman, Josephine Hull, Gene Lockhart, Craig Stevens, Jay C. Flippen, Ed Begley, Morgan Farley, Chris-Pin Martin, Barbara Knudson, John Maxwell	United States	comedy Western
The Last Outpost	Lewis R. Foster	Rhonda Fleming, Ronald Reagan, Bruce Bennett, Bill Williams, Noah Beery Jr., Hugh Beaumont, Peter Hansen, Lloyd Corrigan, John Ridgely	United States	B Western
Law of the Badlands	Lesley Selander	Tim Holt	United States	B Western
Lawless Cowboys	Lewis D. Collins	Whip Wilson, Fuzzy Knight	United States	B Western
Little Big Horn	Charles Marquis Warren	Lloyd Bridges, John Ireland, Marie Windsor, Reed Hadley, Jim Davis, Wally Cassell, Hugh O'Brian, King Donovan, John Pickard, Sheb Wooley, Rodd Redwing	United States	cavalry Western
The Longhorn	Lewis D. Collins	Wild Bill Elliott, Phyllis Coates	United States	B Western
Man from Sonora	Lewis D. Collins	Johnny Mack Brown, Phyllis Coates	United States	B Western
Man in the Saddle	André de Toth	Randolph Scott, Joan Leslie, Ellen Drew, Alexander Knox, Richard Rober, John Russell, Alfonso Bedoya, Guinn 'Big Boy' Williams, Clem Bevans, Cameron Mitchell, Richard Crane, Frank Sully	United States	traditional Western
The Mark of the Renegade	Hugo Fregonese	Ricardo Montalbán, Cyd Charisse	United States	traditional Western
Montana Desperado	Wallace Fox	Johnny Mack Brown	United States	B Western
My Outlaw Brother	Elliott Nugent	Mickey Rooney, Wanda Hendrix, Robert Preston, Robert Stack, José Torvay, Carlos Múzquiz, Fernando Wagner, Hilda Moreno	United States	traditional Western
Nevada Badmen	Lewis D. Collins	Whip Wilson, Fuzzy Knight	United States	B Western
New Mexico	Irving Reis	Lew Ayres, Marilyn Maxwell, Andy Devine, Robert Hutton, Donald Buka, Ted de Corsia, Lloyd Corrigan, John Hoyt, Jeff Corey, Raymond Burr, Verna Felton, Ian MacDonald, Walter Greaza	United States	B Western
Night Raiders of Montana	Fred C. Brannon	Allan Lane	United States	B Western
Northwest Territory	Frank McDonald	Kirby Grant	United States	B Western
Oh! Susanna	Joseph Kane	Rod Cameron, Lorna Gray, Forrest Tucker, Chill Wills, William Ching, Jim Davis, Wally Cassell, Jimmy Lydon, Douglas Kennedy, William Haade, James Flavin, Charles Stevens, Al Bridge, Marshall Reed, John Pickard	United States	traditional Western
Oklahoma Justice	Lewis D. Collins	Johnny Mack Brown, James Ellison	United States	B Western
Only the Valiant	Gordon Douglas	Gregory Peck, Barbara Payton, Ward Bond, Gig Young, Lon Chaney Jr., Neville Brand, Jeff Corey, Warner Anderson, Steve Brodie, Dan Riss, Terry Kilburn, Herbert Heyes, Art Baker, Hugh Sanders, Michael Ansara, Nana Bryant	United States	traditional Western
Overland Telegraph	Lesley Selander	Tim Holt, Gail Davis	United States	B Western
The Painted Hills	Harold F. Kress	Pal (credited as "Lassie"), Paul Kelly, Bruce Cowling, Gary Gray	United States	family Western
Pals of the Golden West	William Witney	Roy Rogers, Dale Evans	United States	Singing cowboy Western
Passage West	Lewis R. Foster	John Payne, Arleen Whelan	United States	traditional Western
Pecos River	Fred F. Sears	Charles Starrett, Smiley Burnette, Jock Mahoney	United States	B Western
Prairie Roundup	Fred F. Sears	Charles Starrett, Smiley Burnette, Mary Castle	United States	B Western
Raton Pass	Edwin L. Marin	Dennis Morgan, Patricia Neal, Steve Cochran	United States	traditional Western
Rawhide	Henry Hathaway	Tyrone Power, Susan Hayward, Edgar Buchanan, Hugh Marlowe, Jack Elam, George Tobias, Dean Jagger, Jeff Corey, James Millican, Louis Jean Heydt	United States	traditional Western
The Redhead and the Cowboy	Leslie Fenton	Glenn Ford, Rhonda Fleming, Edmond O'Brien, Alan Reed, Morris Ankrum, Edith Evanson, Perry Ivins, Janine Perreau, Douglas Spencer, Ray Teal Brock, Ralph Byrd, King Donovan, Tom Moore Gus	United States	traditional Western
Red Mountain	William Dieterle	Alan Ladd, Lizabeth Scott, John Ireland, Arthur Kennedy, Bert Freed, Jeff Corey, Neville Brand, Whit Bissell	United States	traditional Western
Ridin' the Outlaw Trail	Fred F. Sears	Charles Starrett, Smiley Burnette, Sunny Vickers	United States	B Western
Roar of the Iron Horse	Spencer Gordon Bennet, Thomas Carr	Jock Mahoney	United States	serial Western
Rodeo King and the Senorita	Philip Ford	Rex Allen	United States	Singing cowboy Western
Rough Riders of Durango	Fred C. Brannon	Allan Lane, Denver Pyle	United States	B Western
Saddle Legion	Lesley Selander	Tim Holt, Dorothy Malone, Richard Martin, Movita Castaneda, Mauritz Hugo, James Bush, Robert Livingston, Cliff Clark, Stanley Andrews, George J. Lewis, Robert J. Wilke	United States	B Western
Santa Fe	Irving Pichel	Randolph Scott, Janis Carter, Jerome Courtland, Peter M. Thompson, John Archer, Warner Anderson, Roy Roberts, Billy House, Olin Howland, Allene Roberts	United States	traditional Western
The Secret of Convict Lake	Michael Gordon	Glenn Ford, Gene Tierney, Ethel Barrymore, Zachary Scott, Ann Dvorak, Barbara Bates, Helen Westcott, Jack Lambert, Max Wagner, Ray Teal	United States	traditional Western
Sierra Passage	Frank McDonald	Wayne Morris, Lola Albright, Lloyd Corrigan	United States	B Western
Silver Canyon	John English	Gene Autry	United States	Singing cowboy Western
Silver City	Byron Haskin	Edmond O'Brien, Yvonne De Carlo, Barry Fitzgerald	United States	traditional Western
Silver City Bonanza	George Blair	Rex Allen	United States	Singing cowboy Western
Skipalong Rosenbloom	Sam Newfield	Maxie Rosenbloom, Max Baer	United States	comedy Western
Slaughter Trail	Irving Allen	Brian Donlevy, Gig Young, Virginia Grey, Andy Devine, Terry Gilkyson, Robert Hutton	United States	tradition Western
Snake River Desperadoes	Fred F. Sears	Charles Starrett, Smiley Burnette, Don Reynolds	United States	B Western
South of Caliente	William Witney	Roy Rogers, Dale Evans	United States	Singing cowboy Western
Spoilers of the Plains	William Witney	Roy Rogers	United States	Singing cowboy Western
Sugarfoot	Edwin L. Marin	Randolph Scott, Adele Jergens, Raymond Massey, S.Z. Sakall, Robert Warwick, Arthur Hunnicutt, Hugh Sanders, Hope Landin, Hank Worden, Gene Evans	United States	traditional Western
The Tall Target	Anthony Mann	Dick Powell, Paula Raymond, Adolphe Menjou	United States	traditional Western
Texas Lawmen	Lewis D. Collins	Johnny Mack Brown, James Ellison	United States	B Western
Texans Never Cry	Frank McDonald	Gene Autry	United States	Singing cowboy Western
The Texas Rangers	Phil Karlson	George Montgomery, Gale Storm	United States	traditional Western
Three Desperate Men	Sam Newfield	Preston Foster, Jim Davis, Virginia Grey	United States	traditional Western
Thunder in God's Country	George Blair	Rex Allen	United States	Singing cowboy Western
The Thundering Trail	Ron Ormond	Lash LaRue, Al St. John, Sally Anglim	United States	Lash LaRue serial Western
Tomahawk	George Sherman	Van Heflin, Yvonne De Carlo, Alex Nicol, Preston Foster, Jack Oakie, Tom Tully, John War Eagle, Rock Hudson, Susan Cabot, Arthur Space, Russell Conway, Ann Doran, Stuart Randall	United States	traditional Western
Utah Wagon Train	Philip Ford	Rex Allen	United States	Singing cowboy Western
Valley of Fire	John English	Gene Autry	United States	Singing cowboy Western
The Vanishing Outpost	Ron Ormond	Lash LaRue, Al St. John, Archie Twitchell	United States	Lash LaRue serial Western
Vengeance Valley	Richard Thorpe	Burt Lancaster, Robert Walker, Joanne Dru, Sally Forrest, John Ireland, Carleton Carpenter, Ray Collins, Ted de Corsia, Hugh O'Brian, Will Wright, Stanley Andrews	United States	traditional Western
Warpath	Byron Haskin	Edmond O'Brien, Dean Jagger, Forrest Tucker	United States	traditional Western
Westward the Women	William A. Wellman	Robert Taylor, Denise Darcel, John McIntire, Hope Emerson, Julie Bishop, Lenore Lonergan, Henry Nakamura, Marilyn Erskine, Renata Vanni, Pat Conway	United States	traditional Western
When the Redskins Rode	Lew landers	Jon Hall, Mary Castle, James Seay, John Ridgely	United States	traditional Western
Whirlwind	John English	Gene Autry	United States	Singing cowboy Western
Yukon Manhunt	Frank McDonald	Kirby Grant, Gail Davis, Margaret Field	United States	Canadian mountie B Western
1952
Apache Country	George Archainbaud	Gene Autry	United States	Singing cowboy Western
Apache War Smoke	Harold F. Kress	Gilbert Roland, Glenda Farrell	United States	B Western
Barbed Wire	George Archainbaud	Gene Autry	United States	Singing cowboy Western
The Battle at Apache Pass	George Sherman	John Lund, Jeff Chandler, Susan Cabot, Bruce Cowling, Beverly Tyler, Richard Egan, Jay Silverheels, John Hudson, Jack Elam, Regis Toomey, Tommy Cook, Hugh O'Brian, James Best, Palmer Lee, William Reynolds, Paul Smith, Jack Ingram	United States	B Western
Bend of the River	Anthony Mann	James Stewart, Arthur Kennedy, Julie Adams, Rock Hudson, Lori Nelson, Jay C. Flippen, Howard Petrie, Chubby Johnson, Stepin Fetchit, Harry Morgan, Jack Lambert, Royal Dano, Frances Bavier	United States	psychological Western
The Big Sky	Howard Hawks	Kirk Douglas, Dewey Martin, Elizabeth Threatt, Arthur Hunnicutt, Buddy Baer, Steven Geray, Henri Letondal, Hank Worden, Jim Davis	United States	traditional Western
The Big Trees	Felix E. Feist	Kirk Douglas, Eve Miller, Patrice Wymore, Edgar Buchanan, John Archer, Alan Hale Jr., Roy Roberts, Charles Meredith, Harry Cording, Ellen Corby, Duke Watson, Lane Chandler, Elizabeth Slifer, Lilian Bond, Michael McHale, William Challee	United States	Lumberjack Western
Black Hills Ambush	Harry Keller	Allan Lane	United States	B Western
The Black Lash	Ron Ormond	Lash LaRue, Al St. John, Peggy Stewart	United States	Lash LaRue serial Western
Blue Canadian Rockies	George Archainbaud	Gene Autry	United States	Singing cowboy Western
Border Saddlemates	William Witney	Rex Allen	United States	Singing cowboy Western
Brave Warrior	Spencer Gordon Bennet	Jon Hall, Christine Larson	United States	traditional Western
Bronco Buster	Budd Boetticher	John Lund, Scott Brady, Joyce Holden, Chill Wills	United States	traditional Western
Buffalo Bill in Tomahawk Territory	Bernard B. Ray	Clayton Moore	United States	B Western
Bugles in the Afternoon	Roy Rowland	Ray Milland, Hugh Marlowe, Helena Carter, Forrest Tucker, Barton MacLane, George Reeves	United States	traditional Western
The Bushwackers	Rodney Amateau	John Ireland, Dorothy Malone, Wayne Morris, Lawrence Tierney, Lon Chaney, Myrna Dell, Frank Marlowe, Bill Holnes, Jack Elam, Bob Wood, Charles Trowbridge, Stuart Randall, George Lynn	United States	traditional Western
California Conquest	Lew Landers	Cornel Wilde, Teresa Wright, Alfonso Bedoya, Lisa Ferraday, Eugene Iglesias, John Dehner, Ivan Lebedeff, Renzo Cesana, Rico Alaniz	United States	traditional Western
Canyon Ambush	Lewis D. Collins	Johnny Mack Brown	United States	B Western
Captive of Billy the Kid	Fred C. Brannon	Allan Lane	United States	B Western
Carson City	André de Toth	Randolph Scott, Lucille Norman, Raymond Massey, Richard Webb, James Millican, Larry Keating, George Cleveland, William Haade, Don Beddoe, Thurston Hall, Vince Barnett	United States	traditional Western
Cattle Town	Noel M. Smith	Dennis Morgan, Philip Carey, Amanda Blake, Rita Moreno, Paul Picerni, Ray Teal, Jay Novello, George O'Hanlon, Robert J. Wilke, Sheb Wooley, Charles Meredith, Merv Griffin	United States	B Western
The Cimarron Kid	Budd Boetticher	Audie Murphy, Beverly Tyler, James Best, Yvette Dugay, John Hudson, Hugh O'Brian, Roy Roberts, David Wolfe, Noah Beery Jr., Leif Erickson, John Hubbard, Frank Silvera	United States	traditional Western
Colorado Sundown	William Witney	Rex Allen	United States	Singing cowboy Western
Cripple Creek	Ray Nazarro	George Montgomery, Jerome Courtland, Richard Egan, Karin Booth, William Bishop	United States	traditional Western
Denver and Rio Grande	Byron Haskin	Edmond O'Brien, Sterling Hayden, Dean Jagger, Laura Elliott, Lyle Bettger, J. Carrol Naish, Zasu Pitts, Tom Powers, Robert Barrat, Paul Fix, Don Haggerty, James Burke	United States	Railroad Western
Desert Passage	George Blair	Tim Holt, Joan Dixon, Walter Reed, John Dehner, Joan Dixon, Dorothy Patrick, Denver Pyle, Clayton Moore	United States	B Western
Desert Pursuit	George Blair	Wayne Morris, Virginia Grey, George Tobias, Anthony Caruso, Emmett Lynn, John Doucette, Robert Bice, Frank Lackteen, Artie Ortego, Gloria Talbott, William Wilkerson	United States	B Western
Desperadoes' Outpost	Philip Ford	Allan Lane	United States	B Western
The Duel at Silver Creek	Don Siegel	Audie Murphy, Faith Domergue, Stephen McNally, Susan Cabot, Gerald Mohr, Eugene Iglesias, Kyle James, Walter Sande, Lee Marvin, George Eldredge, Griff Barnett	United States	traditional Western
El Enamorado	Miguel Zacarías	Pedro Infante, Sara Montiel, Eulalio González	Mexico	comedy Western
Face to Face	John Brahm, Bretaigne Windust	James Mason, Gene Lockhart, Robert Preston	United States	traditional Western
Fargo	Lewis D. Collins	Wild Bill Elliott, Phyllis Coates	United States	B Western
Flaming Feather	Ray Enright	Sterling Hayden, Forrest Tucker, Arleen Whelan, Barbara Rush, Victor Jory, Richard Arlen, Edgar Buchanan, Carol Thurston, Ian MacDonald, George Cleveland	United States	B Western
Fort Osage	Lesley Selander	Rod Cameron, Jane Nigh, Morris Ankrum, Douglas Kennedy, John Ridgely, William Phipps, Myron Healey, I. Stanford Jolley, Lane Bradford, Dorothy Adams, Iron Eyes Cody, Francis McDonald, Barbara Woodell	United States	B Western
The Frontier Phantom	Ron Ormond	Lash LaRue, Al St. John, Archie Twitchell	United States	final Lash LaRue and Al St. John Western
Gold Fever	Leslie Goodwins	John Calvert, Ralph Morgan	United States	B Western
Grubstake	Larry Buchanan	Stephen Wyman, Jack Klugman	United States	B Western
The Gunman	Lewis D. Collins	Whip Wilson, Phyllis Coates	United States	B Western
The Half-Breed	Stuart Gilmore	Robert Young, Janis Carter, Jack Buetel, Barton MacLane, Reed Hadley, Porter Hall, Connie Gilchrist, Sammy White, Damian O'Flynn, Frank Wilcox, Judy Walsh	United States	B Western
Hangman's Knot	Roy Huggins	Randolph Scott, Donna Reed, Claude Jarman Jr., Frank Faylen, Richard Denning, Lee Marvin, Glenn Langan, Jeanette Nolan, Clem Bevans, Ray Teal, Guinn Williams, Monte Blue	United States	traditional Western
The Hawk of Wild River	Fred F. Sears	Charles Starrett, Smiley Burnette, Jock Mahoney, Clayton Moore, Eddie Parker, Jim Diehl, Lane Chandler, Syd Saylor, Sam Flint	United States	B Western
Hellgate	Charles Marquis Warren	Sterling Hayden, Joan Leslie, Ward Bond, James Arness, Peter Coe, John Pickard, Robert Wilkie, Kyle James, Richard Emory, Richard Paxton, William Hamel	United States	B Western
Hiawatha	Kurt Neumann	Vince Edwards, Yvette Dugay	United States	traditional Western
High Noon	Fred Zinnemann	Gary Cooper, Grace Kelly, Thomas Mitchell, Lloyd Bridges, Katy Jurado, Otto Kruger, Lon Chaney Jr., Ian MacDonald, Eve McVeagh, Harry Morgan, Morgan Farley, Harry Shannon, Lee Van Cleef, Robert J. Wilke, Sheb Wooley, Howland Chamberlain, Jack Elam, John Doucette	United States	Revisionist Western
Horizons West	Budd Boetticher	Robert Ryan, Julia Adams, Rock Hudson, Judith Braun, John McIntire, Raymond Burr, James Arness, Dennis Weaver, Frances Bavier, Tom Powers, John Hubbard, Rodolfo Acosta, Douglas Fowley, Walter Reed, Raymond Greenleaf, Dan Poore, Frank Chase, Mae Clarke	United States	traditional Western
Indian Uprising	Ray Nazarro	George Montgomery, Audrey Long, Carl Benton Reid, Eugene Iglesias, John Baer, Joe Sawyer, Robert Foster Dover, Eddie Walter, Douglas Kennedy, Robert Shayne, Miguel Inclan, Hugh Sanders	United States	traditional Western
The Iron Mistress	Gordon Douglas	Alan Ladd, Virginia Mayo	United States	traditional Western
Junction City	Ray Nazarro	Charles Starrett, Smiley Burnette, Jock Mahoney	United States	B Western
Kangaroo	Lewis Milestone	Maureen O'Hara, Peter Lawford	United States	traditional Western
Kansas Territory	Lewis D. Collins	Wild Bill Elliott, House Peters Jr.	United States	B Western
The Kid from Broken Gun	Fred F. Sears	Charles Starrett, Smiley Burnette, Jock Mahoney, Angela Stevens	United States	B Western
Laramie Mountains	Ray Nazarro	Charles Starrett, Smiley Burnette, Jock Mahoney	United States	B Western
The Last Musketeer	William Witney	Rex Allen	United States	Singing cowboy Western
Leadville Gunslinger	Harry Keller	Allan Lane	United States	B Western
The Lion and the Horse	Louis King	Steve Cochran, Ray Teal	United States	traditional Western
Lone Star	Vincent Sherman	Clark Gable, Ava Gardner, Broderick Crawford, Lionel Barrymore, Beulah Bondi, Ed Begley, James Burke, William Farnum, Lowell Gilmore, Moroni Olsen, Russell Simpson, William Conrad, Ric Roman, Victor Sutherland, Nacho Galindo, Trevor Bardette, Harry Woods, Emmett Lynn	United States	traditional Western
The Lusty Men	Nicholas Ray	Susan Hayward, Robert Mitchum, Arthur Kennedy, Arthur Hunnicutt, Frank Faylen, Walter Coy, Carol Nugent, Maria Hart, Lorna Thayer, Burt Mustin, Karen King, Jimmy Dodd, Eleanor Todd, Riley Hill	United States	traditional Western
Man from the Black Hills	Thomas Carr	Johnny Mack Brown, James Ellison	United States	B Western
The Maverick	Thomas Carr	Wild Bill Elliott, Phyllis Coates	United States	B Western
Montana Belle	Allan Dwan	Jane Russell, George Brent, Scott Brady, Forrest Tucker, Andy Devine, Jack Lambert, John Litel, Ray Teal, Rory Mallinson, Roy Barcroft, Ned Davenport, Dick Elliott, Gene Roth, Stanley Andrews	United States	traditional Western
Montana Incident	Lewis D. Collins	Whip Wilson	United States	B Western
Montana Territory	Ray Nazarro	Lon McCallister, Wanda Hendrix, Preston Foster, Hugh Sanders, Jack Elam, Clayton Moore, Robert Griffin, Myron Healey, Eddy Waller	United States	B Western
Night Raiders	Howard Bretherton	Whip Wilson, Fuzzy Knight	United States	B Western
Night Stage to Galveston	George Archainbaud	Gene Autry	United States	Singing cowboy Western
Oklahoma Annie	R.G. Springsteen	Judy Canova, John Russell, Grant Withers, Roy Barcroft, Emmett Lynn, Frank Ferguson, Minerva Urecal, Houseley Stevenson, Almira Sessions, Allen Jenkins, Maxine Gates, Emory Parnell, Denver Pyle, House Peters Jr., Andrew Tombes, Fuzzy Knight	United States	B Western
Old Oklahoma Plains	William Witney	Rex Allen	United States	Singing cowboy Western
The Old West	George Archainbaud	Gene Autry	United States	Singing cowboy Western
The Outcasts of Poker Flat	Joseph M. Newman	Anne Baxter, Dale Robertson, Miriam Hopkins, Cameron Mitchell, Craig Hill, Barbara Bates, William H. Lynn, Dick Rich	United States	B Western
The Pathfinder	Sidney Salkow	George Montgomery, Helena Carter, Jay Silverheels, Walter Kingsford, Rodd Redwing, Stephen Bekassy, Elena Verdugo, Bruce Lester, Chief Yowlachie, John Hart, Lyle Talbot, Edward Coch	United States	traditional Western
Pony Soldier	Joseph M. Newman	Tyrone Power, Cameron Mitchell, Thomas Gomez, Penny Edwards, Robert Horton, Anthony Earl Numkena, Adeline DeWalt Reynolds, Howard Petrie, Stuart Randall, Richard Boone, Frank deKova, Michael Rennie, Earl Holliman	United States	traditional Western
Rancho Notorious	Fritz Lang	Marlene Dietrich, Arthur Kennedy, Mel Ferrer, Gloria Henry, William Frawley, Lisa Ferraday, John Raven, Jack Elam, George Reeves, Frank Ferguson, Francis McDonald, Lloyd Gough, Russell Johnson, Emory Parnell	United States	traditional Western
Return of the Texan	Delmer Daves	Dale Robertson, Joanne Dru, Walter Brennan, Richard Boone, Tom Tully, Robert Horton, Helen Westcott, Lonnie Thomas, Dennis Ross	United States	traditional Western
Ride the Man Down	Joseph Kane	Brian Donlevy, Rod Cameron, Ella Raines, Forrest Tucker, Barbara Britton, Chill Wills	United States	traditional Western
The Rough, Tough West	Ray Nazarro	Charles Starrett, Smiley Burnette, Jock Mahoney	United States	B Western
The San Francisco Story	Robert Parrish	Joel McCrea, Yvonne De Carlo, Sidney Blackmer, Richard Erdman, Florence Bates, Onslow Stevens, John Raven, O.Z. Whitehead, Ralph Dumke, Robert Foulk, Lane Chandler	United States	traditional Western
The Savage	George Marshall	Charlton Heston, Susan Morrow, Peter Hansen, Joan Taylor, Richard Rober, Don Porter, Ted de Corsia, Ian MacDonald, Milburn Stone, Angela Clarke, Michael Tolan	United States	traditional Western
Scarlet Angel	Sidney Salkow	Yvonne De Carlo, Rock Hudson	United States	traditional Western
Sky Full of Moon	Norman Foster	Carleton Carpenter, Keenan Wynn, Jan Sterling	United States	comedy Western
Smoky Canyon	Fred F. Sears	Charles Starrett, Smiley Burnette, Jock Mahoney	United States	B Western
Son of Geronimo	Spencer Gordon Bennet	Clayton Moore	United States	serial Western
Son of Paleface	Frank Tashlin	Bob Hope, Jane Russell, Roy Rogers, Trigger, Bill Williams, Lloyd Corrigan, Paul E. Burns, Douglass Dumbrille, Harry von Zell, Iron Eyes Cody, William 'Wee Willie' Davis, Charles Cooley, Sylvia Lewis, Jean Willes	United States	comedy Western
South Pacific Trail	William Witney	Rex Allen	United States	Singing cowboy Western
Springfield Rifle	André de Toth	Gary Cooper, Phyllis Thaxter, David Brian, Paul Kelly, Lon Chaney Jr., Philip Carey, Fess Parker, Martin Milner	United States	traditional Western
The Story of Will Rogers	Michael Curtiz	Will Rogers Jr., Jane Wyman, Carl Benton Reid, Eve Miller, James Gleason, Slim Pickens Noah Beery Jr., Mary Wickes, Steve Brodie, Pinky Tomlin, Margaret Field, Eddie Cantor, Frank Bank	United States	comedy Western
The Treasure of Lost Canyon	Ted Tetzlaff	William Powell, Julie Adams, Charles Drake, Rosemary DeCamp, Tommy Ivo, Henry Hull, Chubby Johnson, John Doucette, Marvin Press, Griff Barnett	United States	B Western
Untamed Frontier	Hugo Fregonese	Joseph Cotten, Shelley Winters, Scott Brady, Suzan Ball, Minor Watson, Douglas Spencer, John Alexander, Lee Van Cleef, Fess Parker, David Janssen	United States	traditional Western
Viva Zapata!	Elia Kazan	Marlon Brando, Jean Peters, Anthony Quinn, Joseph Wiseman, Arnold Moss, Alan Reed, Margo, Frank Silvera, Richard Garrick, Fay Roope, Mildred Dunnock, Henry Silva	United States	traditional Western set in Mexico
Wagon Team	George Archainbaud	Gene Autry	United States	Singing cowboy Western
Woman of the North Country	Joseph Kane	Ruth Hussey, Rod Cameron, John Agar, Gale Storm	United States	traditional Western
Way of a Gaucho	Jacques Tourneur	Gene Tierney, Rory Calhoun	United States	traditional Western
The Wild North	Andrew Marton	Stewart Granger, Wendell Corey, Cyd Charisse, Morgan Farley, J.M. Kerrigan, Howard Petrie, Houseley Stevenson, Lewis Martin, John War Eagle, Ray Teal, Clancy Cooper	United States	Canadian Mountie
Yukon Gold	Frank McDonald	Kirby Grant, Martha Hyer	United States	Canadian mountie B Western
1953
Ambush at Tomahawk Gap	Fred F. Sears	John Hodiak, David Brian, John Derek, Ray Teal, María Elena Marqués	United States	traditional Western
Arena	Richard Fleischer	Gig Young, Jean Hagen, Polly Bergen, Harry Morgan, Barbara Lawrence, Robert Horton	United States	3-D Western
Arrowhead	Charles Marquis Warren	Charlton Heston, Jack Palance, Katy Jurado, Brian Keith, Mary Sinclair, Milburn Stone, Richard Shannon, Lewis Martin, Frank DeKova, Robert J. Wilke, Peter Coe, Kyle James, John Pickard, Pat Hogan	United States	traditional Western
Back to God's Country	Joseph Pevney	Rock Hudson, Marcia Henderson, Steve Cochran	United States	traditional Western
Bandits of the West	Harry Keller	Allan Lane	United States	B Western
Blowing Wild	Hugo Fregonese	Gary Cooper, Barbara Stanwyck, Ruth Roman, Anthony Quinn	United States	traditional Western set in Mexico
Born to the Saddle	William Beaudine	Chuck Courtney, Donald Woods	United States	B Western
Calamity Jane	David Butler	Doris Day, Howard Keel, Allyn Ann McLerie, Philip Carey, Dick Wesson, Paul Harvey, Chubby Johnson, Gale Robbins, Francis McDonald, Monte Montague, Bess Flowers, Tom London	United States	musical/romance Western
Canadian Mounties vs. Atomic Invaders	Franklin Adreon	William Henry, Susan Morrow, Arthur Space, Dale Van Sickel, Pierre Watkin	United States	serial Western
Captain John Smith and Pocahontas	Lew Landers	Anthony Dexter, Jody Lawrence	United States	traditional Western
The Charge at Feather River	Gordon Douglas	Guy Madison, Frank Lovejoy, Helen Westcott, Vera Miles, Dick Wesson, Onslow Stevens, Steve Brodie, Ron Hagerthy, Fay Roope, Neville Brand, Henry Kulky, Lane Chandler, Fred Carson, James Brown	United States	3-D Western
City of Bad Men	Harmon Jones	Dale Robertson, Jeanne Crain, Richard Boone, Lloyd Bridges, Carole Mathews, Carl Betz, Whitfield Connor, Hugh Sanders, Rodolfo Acosta, Pascual García Peña	United States	traditional Western
Column South	Frederick de Cordova	Audie Murphy, Joan Evans, Robert Sterling, Ray Collins, Dennis Weaver, Palmer Lee, Russell Johnson, Jack Kelly, Johnny Downs, Bob Steele, James Best, Ralph Moody	United States	traditional Western
Conquest of Cochise	William Castle	John Hodiak, Robert Stack, Joy Page, Rico Alaniz, Fortunio Bonanova, Edward Colmans, Alex Montoya, Steven Ritch, Carol Thurston, Rodd Redwing	United States	traditional Western
Cow Country	Lesley Selander	Edmond O'Brien, Helen Westcott, Robert Lowery, Barton MacLane, Peggie Castle, Robert Barrat, James Millican, Don Beddoe, Robert J. Wilke, Raymond Hatton, Chuck Courtney	United States	traditional Western
Devil's Canyon	Alfred L. Werker	Virginia Mayo, Dale Robertson, Stephen McNally, Arthur Hunnicutt, Robert Keith, Jay C. Flippen, George J. Lewis, Whit Bissell, Earl Holliman, Paul Fix	United States	traditional Western
Down Laredo Way	William Witney	Rex Allen	United States	Singing cowboy Western
El Paso Stampede	Harry Keller	Allan Lane	United States	B Western
Escape from Fort Bravo	John Sturges	William Holden, Eleanor Parker, John Forsythe, William Demarest, William Campbell, Polly Bergen, Richard Anderson, Carl Benton Reid, John Lupton	United States	traditional Western
Fangs of the Arctic	Frank McDonald	Kirby Grant, Lorna Hanson	United States	Canadian mountie B Western
The Fighting Lawman	Thomas Carr	Wayne Morris, Virginia Grey	United States	B Western
Fort Ti	William Castle	George Montgomery, Joan Vohs, Irving Bacon, James Seay, Ben Astar, Phyllis Fowler, Howard Petrie, Cicely Browne, Lester Matthews, George Leigh, Louis Merrill	United States	3-D Western set in the French and Indian War
Fort Vengeance	Lesley Selander	James Craig, Rita Moreno	United States	Canadian mountie traditional Western
Goldtown Ghost Riders	George Archainbaud	Gene Autry	United States	Singing cowboy Western
The Great Jesse James Raid	Reginald LeBorg	Willard Parker, Barbara Payton, Tom Neal, Wallace Ford, Jim Bannon, James Anderson, Richard H. Cutting, Barbara Woodell	United States	traditional Western
The Great Sioux Uprising	Lloyd Bacon	Jeff Chandler, Faith Domergue, Lyle Bettger, Peter Whitney, Stacy Harris, Walter Sande, John War Eagle, Glenn Strange, Charles Arnt, Boyd 'Red' Morgan, Lane Bradford, Jack Ingram	United States	traditional Western
Gun Belt	Ray Nazarro	George Montgomery, Tab Hunter, Helen Westcott, John Dehner, William Bishop, Jack Elam, Douglas Kennedy, James Millican, Hugh Sanders, Bruce Cowling	United States	B Western
Gun Fury	Raoul Walsh	Rock Hudson, Donna Reed, Philip Carey, Roberta Haynes, Leo Gordon, Lee Marvin, Neville Brand, Ray Thomas, Robert Herron, Phil Rawlins, Forrest Lewis	United States	traditional Western
Gunsmoke	Nathan Juran	Audie Murphy, Susan Cabot, Paul Kelly, Charles Drake, Mary Castle, Jack Kelly, Jesse White, Donald Randolph, William Reynolds, Chubby Johnson	United States	traditional Western
Hannah Lee: An American Primitive	Lee Garmes, John Ireland	Macdonald Carey, Joanne Dru, John Ireland	United States	3-D Western (re-released in 1954 as Outlaw Territory)
The Homesteaders	Lewis D. Collins	Wild Bill Elliott, Robert Lowery	United States	B Western
Hondo	John Farrow	John Wayne, Geraldine Page, Ward Bond, Michael Pate, James Arness, Rodolfo Acosta, Leo Gordon, Tom Irish, Lee Aaker, Paul Fix, Rayford Barnes, Frank McGrath, Morry Ogden, Chuck Roberson	United States	3-D Western
Iron Mountain Trail	William Witney	Rex Allen	United States	Singing cowboy Western
Jack McCall, Desperado	Sidney Salkow	George Montgomery, Angela Stevens, Douglas Kennedy, James Seay, Eugene Iglesias, Willam Tannen, Jay Silverheels, John Hamilton, Selmer Jackson	United States	traditional Western
Jack Slade	Harold D. Schuster	Mark Stevens, Dorothy Malone, Barton MacLane, John Litel, Paul Langton, Harry Shannon John Harmon, Jim Bannon, Lee Van Cleef, Ron Hargrave, Nelson Leigh, Richard Reeves, Robert Carson, Harry Cheshire, Steve Darrell	United States	B Western
Kansas Pacific	Ray Nazarro	Sterling Hayden, Eve Miller, Barton MacLane, Reed Hadley, Irving Bacon, James Griffith, Douglas Fowley, Harry Shannon, Myron Healey, Clayton Moore, Robert Keys, Tom Fadden, Jonathan Hale	United States	B Western
Last of the Comanches	André de Toth	Broderick Crawford, Barbara Hale, Johnny Stewart, Lloyd Bridges	United States	traditional Western
Last of the Pony Riders	George Archainbaud	Gene Autry	United States	Singing cowboy Western
The Last Posse	Alfred L. Werker	Broderick Crawford, John Derek, Charles Bickford, Wanda Hendrix	United States	traditional Western
Law and Order	Nathan Juran	Ronald Reagan, Dorothy Malone, Preston Foster, Alex Nicol, Ruth Hampton, Russell Johnson, Barry Kelley, Chubby Johnson, Jack Kelly, Dennis Weaver, Wally Cassell, Richard Garrick	United States	B Western
The Lawless Breed	Raoul Walsh	Rock Hudson, Julia Adams, Mary Castle, John McIntire, Hugh O'Brian, Dennis Weaver, Forrest Lewis, Lee Van Cleef, Tom Fadden, Race Gentry, Richard Garland, Glenn Strange, William Pullen	United States	traditional Western
The Lone Hand	George Sherman	Joel McCrea, Barbara Hale, Alex Nicol, Jim Arness, Charles Drake, Jimmy Hunt, Roy Roberts, Frank Ferguson	United States	traditional Western
The Man Behind the Gun	Felix E. Feist	Randolph Scott, Patrice Wymore, Dick Wesson, Philip Carey, Lina Romay, Roy Roberts, Morris Ankrum, Katherine Warren, Alan Hale Jr., Douglas Fowley, Anthony Caruso, Clancy Cooper, Robert Cabal	United States	traditional Western
The Man from the Alamo	Budd Boetticher	Glenn Ford, Julia Adams, Chill Wills, Hugh O'Brian, Victor Jory, Neville Brand, John Day, Myra Marsh, Jeanne Cooper, Mark Cavell, Edward Norris, Guy Williams	United States	Texas independence Western
The Marksman	Lewis D. Collins	Wayne Morris, Elena Verdugo	United States	B Western
Marshal of Cedar Rock	Harry Keller	Allan Lane	United States	B Western
The Marshal's Daughter	William Berke	Hoot Gibson, Johnny Mack Brown, Laurie Anders	United States	B Western
The Mississippi Gambler	Rudolph Maté	Tyrone Power, Piper Laurie, Julie Adams	United States	traditional Western
The Moonlighter	Roy Rowland	Barbara Stanwyck, Fred MacMurray, Ward Bond, William Ching, John Dierkes, Morris Ankrum, Jack Elam, Charles Halton, Norman Leavitt, Sam Flint, Myra Marsh	United States	traditional Western
The Naked Spur	Anthony Mann	James Stewart, Janet Leigh, Robert Ryan, Ralph Meeker, Millard Mitchell	United States	psychological Western
The Nebraskan	Fred F. Sears	Philip Carey, Roberta Haynes, Wallace Ford, Richard Webb, Lee Van Cleef, Maurice Jara, Regis Toomey, Jay Silverheels, Pat Hogan, Dennis Weaver, Boyd "Red" Morgan	United States	traditional Western
Northern Patrol	Rex Bailey	Kirby Grant, Marian Carr	United States	Canadian mountie B Western
Old Overland Trail	William Witney	Rex Allen	United States	Singing cowboy Western
On Top of Old Smoky	George Archainbaud	Gene Autry	United States	Singing cowboy Western
Pack Train	George Archainbaud	Gene Autry	United States	Singing cowboy Western
A Perilous Journey	R.G. Springsteen	Vera Ralston, Scott Brady	United States	traditional Western
The Phantom Stockman	Lee Robinson	Chips Rafferty, Victoria Shaw	Australia	Australian Western
Pony Express	Jerry Hopper	Charlton Heston, Rhonda Fleming, Forrest Tucker, Jan Sterling, Porter Hall, Henry Brandon, Stuart Randall, Lewis Martin, Pat Hogan	United States	traditional Western
Powder River	Louis King	Rory Calhoun, Corinne Calvet, Cameron Mitchell, Penny Edwards, Carl Betz, John Dehner, Raymond Greenleaf, Victor Sutherland	United States	traditional Western
The Redhead from Wyoming	Lee Sholem	Maureen O'Hara, Alex Nicol, William Bishop, Robert Strauss, Alexander Scourby, Palmer Lee, Jack Kelly, Jeanne Cooper, Dennis Weaver, Stacy Harris	United States	traditional Western
Red River Shore	Harry Keller	Rex Allen	United States	Singing cowboy Western
Ride, Vaquero!	John Farrow	Robert Taylor, Ava Gardner, Howard Keel, Anthony Quinn, Jack Elam, Kurt Kasznar	United States	traditional Western
Saginaw Trail	George Archainbaud	Gene Autry	United States	Singing cowboy Western
San Antone	Joseph Kane	Rod Cameron, Arleen Whelan, Forrest Tucker, Katy Jurado	United States	traditional Western
Seminole	Budd Boetticher	Rock Hudson, Anthony Quinn, Barbara Hale, Richard Carlson, Hugh O'Brian, Russell Johnson, Lee Marvin, Ralph Moody, Fay Roope, James Best	United States	traditional Western
Shadows of Tombstone	William Witney	Rex Allen	United States	Singing cowboy Western
Shane	George Stevens	Alan Ladd, Jean Arthur, Van Heflin, Brandon deWilde, Walter Jack Palance, Ben Johnson, Edgar Buchanan, Emile Meyer, Elisha Cook Jr., Douglas Spencer, John Dierkes, Ellen Corby, Edith Evanson, Leonard Strong, Nancy Kulp	United States	traditional Western
Shark River	John Rawlins	Steve Cochran, Carole Mathews	United States	Florida Western
So Big	Robert Wise	Jane Wyman, Sterling Hayden, Nancy Olson	United States	dramatic Western
The Sun Shines Bright	John Ford	Charles Winninger, Arleen Whelan, John Russell, Stepin Fetchit	United States	traditional Western
Take Me to Town	Douglas Sirk	Ann Sheridan, Sterling Hayden	United States	comedy Western
The Stranger Wore a Gun	André de Toth	Randolph Scott, Claire Trevor, Joan Weldon, George Macready	United States	traditional Western
The Tall Texan	Elmo Williams	Lloyd Bridges, Lee J. Cobb, Marie Windsor, Luther Adler, Syd Saylor, Samuel Herrick, George Steele, Dean Train	United States	traditional Western
Those Redheads from Seattle	Lewis R. Foster	Rhonda Fleming, Gene Barry, Agnes Moorehead	United States	musical Western
Thunder Over the Plains	André de Toth	Randolph Scott, Lex Barker, Phyllis Kirk, Charles McGraw, Henry Hull, Elisha Cook Jr., Hugh Sanders, Lane Chandler, James Brown, Fess Parker	United States	traditional Western
Tumbleweed	Nathan Juran	Audie Murphy, Lori Nelson, Chill Wills, Roy Roberts, Russell Johnson, K. T. Stevens, Madge Meredith, Lee Van Cleef, I. Stanford Jolley, Ralph Moody, Ross Elliott, Eugene Iglesias, Phil Chambers, Lyle Talbot, King Donovan, Harry Harvey	United States	traditional Western
Vigilante Terror	Lewis D. Collins	Wild Bill Elliott	United States	B Western
War Arrow	George Sherman	Maureen O'Hara, Jeff Chandler, John McIntire, Suzan Ball, Noah Beery Jr., Charles Drake, Henry Brandon, Dennis Weaver, Jay Silverheels, Jim Bannon	United States	traditional Western
War Paint	Lesley Selander	Robert Stack, Joan Taylor, Charles McGraw, Keith Larsen, Peter Graves, Robert Wilke, Walter Reed, John Doucette, Douglas Kennedy, Charles Nolte, Paul Richards	United States	traditional Western
Wings of the Hawk	Budd Boetticher	Van Heflin, Julie Adams, Abbe Lane	United States	traditional Western
Winning of the West	George Archainbaud	Gene Autry, Gail Davis	United States	Singing cowboy Western
Woman They Almost Lynched	Allan Dwan	John Lund, Brian Donlevy, Audrey Totter, Joan Leslie	United States	traditional Western
1954
El Águila Negra	Ramón Peón	Fernando Casanova, Perla Aguiar, Eulalio González	Mexico	Mexico Western
Apache	Robert Aldrich	Burt Lancaster, Jean Peters, John McIntire, Charles Buchinsky, John Dehner, Paul Guilfoyle, Ian MacDonald, Walter Sande, Morris Ankrum, Monte Blue	United States	traditional Western
Arrow in the Dust	Lesley Selander	Sterling Hayden, Coleen Gray, Keith Larsen, Tom Tully, Jimmy Wakely, Tudor Owen, Lee Van Cleef, John Pickard, Carleton Young	United States	B Western
Battle of Rogue River	William Castle	George Montgomery, Richard Denning, Martha Hyer, John Crawford, Emory Parnell, Michael Granger, Freeman Morse, Bill Bryant, Charles Evans, Lee Roberts, Frank Sully, Steven Ritch	United States	B Western
The Black Dakotas	Ray Nazarro	Gary Merrill, Wanda Hendrix, John Bromfield, Noah Beery Jr., Jay Silverheels, Fay Roope, Howard Wendell, Robert F. Simon, James Griffith, Richard Webb, Peter Whitney, John War Eagle, Clayton Moore	United States	B Western
Black Horse Canyon	Jesse Hibbs	Joel McCrea, Mari Blanchard, Race Gentry, Murvyn Vye, Irving Bacon, John Pickard, Ewing Mitchell, Pilar Del Rey	United States	traditional Western
Border River	George Sherman	Joel McCrea, Yvonne De Carlo, Pedro Armendáriz, Alfonso Bedoya, Howard Petrie, Erika Nordin, George J. Lewis, Nacho Galindo, Ivan Triesault, George Wallace, Lane Chandler, Martin Garralaga	United States	traditional Western
The Bounty Hunter	André de Toth	Randolph Scott, Dolores Dorn, Marie Windsor, Howard Petrie, Harry Antrim, Robert Keys, Tyler MacDuff, Ernest Borgnine, Dub Taylor, Fess Parker	United States	traditional Western
The Boy from Oklahoma	Michael Curtiz	Will Rogers Jr., Nancy Olson, Lon Chaney Jr., Anthony Caruso, Wallace Ford, Clem Bevans, Merv Griffin, Louis Jean Heydt, Sheb Wooley, Slim Pickens, Tyler MacDuff, James Griffith	United States	traditional Western
Broken Lance	Edward Dmytryk	Spencer Tracy, Robert Wagner, Jean Peters, Richard Widmark, Katy Jurado, Hugh O'Brian, Eduard Franz, Earl Holliman, E. G. Marshall, Carl Benton Reid, Philip Ober	United States	traditional Western
Cattle Queen of Montana	Allan Dwan	Barbara Stanwyck, Ronald Reagan, Gene Evans, Lance Fuller, Anthony Caruso, Jack Elam, Yvette Duguay, Morris Ankrum, Chubby Johnson, Myron Healey, Rodd Redwing, Paul Birch, Byron Foulger, Burt Mustin	United States	B Western
The Command	David Butler	Guy Madison, Joan Weldon, James Whitmore, Carl Benton Reid, Harvey Lembeck	United States	B Western
Dawn at Socorro	George Sherman	Rory Calhoun, Piper Laurie, David Brian, Kathleen Hughes, Alex Nicol, Edgar Buchanan, Mara Corday, Roy Roberts, Skip Homeier, James Millican, Lee Van Cleef, Stanley Andrews, Paul Brinegar, Philo McCullough, Forrest Taylor	United States	B Western
The Desperado	Thomas Carr	Wayne Morris, Jimmy Lydon	United States	B Western
Destry	George Marshall	Audie Murphy, Mari Blanchard, Lyle Bettger, Thomas Mitchell, Edgar Buchanan, Lori Nelson, Wallace Ford, Mary Wickes, Alan Hale Jr, George Wallace, Richard Reeves, Walter Baldwin, Trevor Bardette, John Doucette	United States	traditional Western
Drum Beat	Delmer Daves	Alan Ladd, Audrey Dalton, Marisa Pavan, Hayden Rorke, Robert Keith, Rodolfo Acosta, Charles Bronson, Elisha Cook Jr., Paul Wexler, Strother Martin	United States	traditional Western
Drums Across the River	Nathan Juran	Audie Murphy, Walter Brennan, Lyle Bettger, Lisa Gaye, Hugh O'Brian, Mara Corday, Jay Silverheels, Emile Meyer, Regis Toomey, Morris Ankrum, Bob Steele, James K Anderson, George Wallace, Lane Bradford, Howard McNear	United States	traditional Western
The Forty-Niners	Thomas Carr	Wild Bill Elliott, Virginia Grey	United States	B Western
Four Guns to the Border	Richard Carlson	Rory Calhoun, Colleen Miller, George Nader, Walter Brennan, Nina Foch, John McIntire, Charles Drake, Jay Silverheels, Nestor Paiva, Mary Field, Robert F. Hoy	United States	B Western
Garden of Evil	Henry Hathaway	Gary Cooper, Susan Hayward, Richard Widmark, Hugh Marlowe, Cameron Mitchell, Rita Moreno, Víctor Manuel Mendoza	United States	traditional Western
The Gambler from Natchez	Henry Levin	Dale Robertson, Debra Paget, Lisa Daniels	United States	traditional Western
Gunfighters of the Northwest	Spencer Gordon Bennet	Jock Mahoney, Clayton Moore	United States	serial Western
Gypsy Colt	Andrew Marton	Donna Corcoran, Ward Bond, Lee Van Cleef	United States	family Western
Hell's Outpost	Joseph Kane	Rod Cameron, Joan Leslie, Chill Wills, John Russell	United States	traditional Western
Jesse James vs. the Daltons	William Castle	Brett King, Barbara Lawrence, James Griffith, John Cliff, Bill Phipps, William Tannen, Rory Mallinson, Nelson Leigh	United States	3-D Western
Jesse James' Women	Don "Red" Barry	Don "Red" Barry, Peggie Castle	United States	B Western
Johnny Guitar	Nicholas Ray	Joan Crawford, Sterling Hayden, Mercedes McCambridge, Scott Brady, Ward Bond, Ben Cooper, Ernest Borgnine, John Carradine, Royal Dano, Frank Ferguson, Paul Fix, Rhys Williams, Ian MacDonald, Robert Osterloh	United States	traditional Western
Jubilee Trail	Joseph Kane	Vera Ralston, Joan Leslie, Forrest Tucker, John Russell, Ray Middleton, Pat O'Brien, Buddy Baer, Jim Davis, Barton MacLane, Richard Webb, James Millican, Charles Stevens, Jack Elam	United States	traditional Western
The Law vs. Billy the Kid	William Castle	Scott Brady, Betta St. John, James Griffith, Alan Hale Jr., Paul Cavanagh, Steve Darrell, William Tannen, William "Bill" Phillips, Benny Rubin, George Berkeley, Gregg Barton, John Cliff, William Fawcett, Eddie Foster, Martin Garralaga, Otis Garth, Robert Griffin, Rory Mallinson, Philo McCullough, Bud Osborne, Frank Sully	United States	traditional Western
The Lawless Rider	Yakima Canutt	Johnny Carpenter, Rose Bascom	United States	B Western
The Lone Gun	Ray Nazarro	George Montgomery, Dorothy Malone, Frank Faylen, Neville Brand, Skip Homeier, Douglas Kennedy, Douglas Fowley, Fay Roope, Robert Wilke	United States	B Western
Man with the Steel Whip	Franklin Adreon	Dick Simmons	United States	serial Western
Massacre Canyon	Fred F. Sears	Philip Carey, Audrey Totter, Douglas Kennedy, Jeff Donnell, Guinn "Big Boy" Williams, Charlita, Ross Elliott, Ralph Dumke, Mel Welles, Chris Alcaide, Steven Ritch, John Pickard	United States	B Western
Masterson of Kansas	William Castle	George Montgomery, Nancy Gates, James Griffith, Jean Willes, Benny Rubin, William Henry, David Bruce, Bruce Cowling, Gregg Barton, Jay Silverheels, John Maxwell	United States	B Western
The Outcast	William Witney	John Derek. Joan Evans	United States	traditional Western
The Outlaw Stallion	Fred F. Sears	Philip Carey, Dorothy Patrick, Billy Gray, Roy Roberts, Gordon Jones, Trevor Bardette, Morris Ankrum	United States	B Western
The Outlaw's Daughter	Wesley Barry	Bill Williams, Kelly Ryan	United States	traditional Western
Overland Pacific	Fred F. Sears	Jock Mahoney, Peggie Castle, William Bishop, Adele Jergens, Pat Hogan	United States	traditional Western
Passion	Allan Dwan	Cornel Wilde, Yvonne De Carlo	United States	traditional Western
Phantom Stallion	Harry Keller	Rex Allen	United States	Credited as the final Singing cowboy Western
The Raid	Hugo Fregonese	Van Heflin, Anne Bancroft, Richard Boone, Lee Marvin	United States	traditional Western
Rails Into Laramie	Jesse Hibbs	John Payne, Mari Blanchard, Dan Duryea, Joyce Mackenzie, Barton MacLane, Ralph Dumke, Harry Shannon, James Griffith, Lee Van Cleef, Myron Healey, Charles Horvath, George Chandler, Douglas Kennedy	United States	traditional Western
Red Garters	George Marshall	Rosemary Clooney, Jack Carson, Guy Mitchell	United States	musical Western
Ricochet Romance	Charles Lamont	Marjorie Main, Chill Wills	United States	comedy Western
Ride Clear of Diablo	Jesse Hibbs	Audie Murphy, Susan Cabot, Dan Duryea, Abbe Lane, Russell Johnson, Paul Birch, William Pullen, Jack Elam, Denver Pyle	United States	traditional Western
Riding Shotgun	André de Toth	Randolph Scott, Wayne Morris, Joan Weldon, Joe Sawyer, James Millican, Charles Bronson, James Bell, Fritz Feld	United States	traditional Western
Riding with Buffalo Bill	Spencer Gordon Bennet	Marshall Reed	United States	serial Western
River of No Return	Otto Preminger	Robert Mitchum, Marilyn Monroe, Tommy Rettig, Rory Calhoun, Douglas Spencer, Murvyn Vye	United States	traditional Western
Rose Marie	Mervyn LeRoy	Ann Blyth, Howard Keel, Fernando Lamas	United States	musical Western
Saskatchewan	Raoul Walsh	Alan Ladd, Shelley Winters, J. Carrol Naish, Hugh O'Brian, Robert Douglas, George J. Lewis, Richard Long, Jay Silverheels, Anton Moreno, Frank Chase, Lowell Gilmore, Anthony Caruso, Henry Wills, Bob Herron	United States	Canadian Mountie Western
Seven Brides for Seven Brothers	Stanley Donen	Howard Keel, Jane Powell, Jeff Richards, Julie Newmar, Matt Mattox, Ruta Kilmonis, Marc Platt, Norma Doggett, Jacques d'Amboise, Virginia Gibson, Tommy Rall, Betty Carr, Russ Tamblyn, Nancy Kilgas	United States	musical Western
Shot in the Frontier	Jules White	Moe Howard, Larry Fine, Shemp Howard	United States	comedy Western
Siege at Red River	Rudolph Maté	Van Johnson, Joanne Dru, Richard Boone, Milburn Stone, Jeff Morrow, Craig Hill, Rico Alaniz, Robert Burton, Pilar Del Rey, Ferris Taylor, John Cliff	United States	traditional Western
Silver Lode	Allan Dwan	Dan Duryea, John Payne	United States	B Western
Sitting Bull	Sidney Salkow	Dale Robertson, Mary Murphy, J. Carrol Naish, John Litel, Joel Fluellen, Iron Eyes Cody, John Hamilton, Douglas Kennedy, William Tannen, William Hopper	United States	traditional Western
Taza, Son of Cochise	Douglas Sirk	Rock Hudson, Barbara Rush, Gregg Palmer, Bart Roberts, Morris Ankrum, Gene Iglesias, Ian MacDonald, Joe Sawyer, Lance Fuller, Robert Hoy, Dan White	United States	traditional Western
They Rode West	Phil Karlson	Robert Francis, Donna Reed, May Wynn, Philip Carey	United States	traditional Western
Track of the Cat	William A. Wellman	Robert Mitchum, Teresa Wright, Diana Lynn, Tab Hunter, Beulah Bondi, Philip Tonge, William Hopper, Carl Switzer	United States	psychological Western
Ukala, Ang Walang Suko (a.k.a. Ukala, No Surrender)	Artemio Tecson	Cesar Ramirez, Alicia Vergel, Chichay, Tolindoy	Philippines	FilAm Western, set in the Philippines
Vera Cruz	Robert Aldrich	Gary Cooper, Burt Lancaster, Denise Darcel, Cesar Romero, Sarita Montiel, George Macready, Ernest Borgnine, Morris Ankrum, Henry Brandon, Charles Buchinsky, Jack Lambert, Jack Elam, James Seay	United States	Western set in Mexico during the Maximillian regime
Yukon Vengeance	William Beaudine	Kirby Grant, Monte Hale	United States	Canadian mountie B Western

== TV series of 1950s ==
see, List of TV Westerns
