= Grace Burgess =

Grace Burgess may refer to:

- Grace Burgess, character in Peaky Blinders (TV series)
- Grace Burgess, character in The Lusty Men
