= Over the Border =

Over the Border may refer to:

- Over the Border (1922 film), lost silent American film
- Over the Border (1950 film), American film
- Over the Border (2006 film), South Korean film
