= Vigilante Hideout =

1950 film by Fred C. Brannon

- Theatrical release poster
- Directed by: Fred C. Brannon
- Screenplay by: Richard Wormser
- Produced by: Gordon Kay
- Starring: Allan Lane; Eddy Waller; Roy Barcroft; Virginia Herrick; Cliff Clark; Don Haggerty
- Cinematography: John MacBurnie
- Edited by: Robert M. Leeds
- Music by: Stanley Wilson
- Production company: Republic Pictures
- Distributed by: Republic Pictures
- Release date: August 6, 1950
- Running time: 60 minutes
- Country: United States
- Language: English

Vigilante Hideout is a 1950 American Western film directed by Fred C. Brannon, written by Richard Wormser and starring Allan Lane, Eddy Waller, Roy Barcroft, Virginia Herrick, Cliff Clark and Don Haggerty. It was released on August 6, 1950 by Republic Pictures.

== Cast ==
- Allan Lane as Rocky Lane
- Black Jack as Black Jack
- Eddy Waller as Nugget Clark
- Roy Barcroft as Muley Price
- Virginia Herrick as Marigae Sanders
- Cliff Clark as Howard Sanders
- Don Haggerty as Jim Benson
- Paul Campbell as Ralph Barrows
- Guy Teague as Blackie
- Art Dillard as Henchman Pete
