= Cowboy G-Men =

American television series

- Genre: Western
- Written by: Buckley Angell; Todhunter Ballard; William R. Cox; Henry B. Donovan; Orville H. Hampton; Monroe Manning; Michael Raison
- Directed by: Thor L. Brooks; Reg Browne; George Cahan; Harold Daniels; Paul Landres
- Starring: Russell Hayden; Jackie Coogan
- Country of origin: United States
- Original language: English
- No. of seasons: 1
- No. of episodes: 39

Production
- Producer: Henry B. Donovan
- Cinematography: Gordon Avil; Kenneth Peach; Henry Sharp; Harold E. Stine; William P. Whitley
- Editors: Thor L. Brooks; Seth Larsen; Carl Pingitore
- Running time: 24–26 minutes
- Production company: Telemount-Mutual Productions

Original release
- Network: Syndication
- Release: September 13, 1952 – June 13, 1953

Cowboy G-Men is an American Western television series that aired in syndication from September 1952 to June 1953, for a total of thirty-nine episodes.

== Synopsis ==
Russell Hayden and Jackie Coogan star as Pat Gallagher and Stoney Crockett, a pair of government agents operating in the American West in the 1870s. Phil Arnold portrayed Zerbo, a sometimes associate of Gallagher and Crockett. Gallagher typically was undercover as a ranch hand, while Crockett took the role of a wrangler. Hand-picked agents Gallagher and Crockett dealt with "counterfeiters, smugglers and robbers and protecting property owners".

Other actors who appeared in Cowboy G-Men included Claudia Barrett and Virginia Herrick.

Cowboy G-Men was based on a story by Henry B. Donovan and featured the writing of such Western fiction authors as Todhunter Ballard and Louis L'Amour.

== Episode list ==
No.	Title	Original release date
1	"Ozark Gold"	September 13, 1952
2	"Chinaman's Chance"	September 20, 1952
3	"The Golden Wolf"	September 27, 1952
4	"The Secret Mission"	October 4, 1952
5	"Chippewa Indians"	October 11, 1952
6	"Center Fire"	October 18, 1952
7	"Beware! No Trespassing"	November 1, 1952
8	"Pixilated"	November 8, 1952
9	"Running Iron"	November 15, 1952
10	"Bounty Jumpers"	November 22, 1952
11	"Gunslingers"	November 29, 1952
12	"Koniackers (Counterfeiters)"	December 6, 1952
13	"Ghost Bushwacker"	December 13, 1952
14	"Salted Mines"	December 20, 1952
15	"Frontier Smugglers"	December 27, 1952
16	"Mysterious Decoy"	January 3, 1953
17	"Ridge of Ghosts"	January 10, 1953
18	"Hang the Jury"	January 17, 1953
19	"Silver Shotgun"	January 24, 1953
20	"Rawhide Gold"	January 31, 1953
21	"The Run Down"	February 7, 1953
22	"Rawhiders"	February 14, 1953
23	"General Delivery"	February 21, 1953
24	"Gypsy Traders"	February 28, 1953
25	"Safe Crackers"	March 7, 1953
26	"Silver Fraud"	March 14, 1953
27	"Hangfire"	March 21, 1953
28	"Hush Money"	March 28, 1953
29	"Ghost Town Mystery"	April 4, 1953
30	"Empty Mailbags"	April 11, 1953
31	"Sawdust Swindle"	April 18, 1953
32	"Spring the Trap"	April 25, 1953
33	"Sidewinder"	May 2, 1953
34	"Indian Trader"	May 9, 1953
35	"Stolen Dynamite"	May 16, 1953
36	"The Woman or"	May 23, 1953
37	"Double Crossed"	May 30, 1953
38	"High Heeled Boots"	June 6, 1953
39	"The California Bullets"	June 13, 1953

== Production ==
Henry B. Donovan was the producer for Telemount-Mutual Productions, a TV production company he established in the late 1940s under the "Telemount Pictures" branding (it would eventually become "Mutual Television Productions" before finally taking on the Telemount-Mutual name), and the series was distributed by United Artists-TV Distribution. Directors included Lesley Selander. The series was filmed in color "with black and white dupes for present day TV release". The Jack Ingram Ranch was used for exterior shots, while interior scenes were filmed in California studios. Taystee Bread sponsored the series in 24 cities.

Hayden and Coogan did their own stunts on the show. Episodes were filmed in groups of 13, with three episodes typically completed within seven days—four days on location, two in a studio and "one day for the 'chases'". Location shots were filmed in the San Fernando Valley.

== Release ==
=== Home media ===
Timeless Media Group released a 10 episode best-of set on DVD in Region 1 on October 26, 2008.

Alpha Home Entertainment has released collections of Cowboy G-Men episodes on DVD. Each volume contains 4 episodes from the series. Six DVDs have been published from 2006 to 2011.

=== International ===
In Japan, Cowboy G-Men was the first show to be dubbed in Japanese in 1956.
