= Border Outlaws =

1950 film by Richard Talmadge

- Theatrical release poster
- Directed by: Richard Talmadge
- Screenplay by: Arthur Hoerl
- Produced by: Jack Seaman; Richard Talmadge
- Starring: Spade Cooley; Maria Hart; Bill Edwards; Bill Kennedy; George Slocum; John Laurenz
- Cinematography: Elmer Dyer
- Edited by: Richard C. Currier
- Production company: Jack Schwarz Productions
- Distributed by: Eagle-Lion Films
- Release date: November 2, 1950
- Running time: 57 minutes
- Country: United States
- Language: English

Border Outlaws is a 1950 American Western film directed by Richard Talmadge and written by Arthur Hoerl. The film stars Spade Cooley, Maria Hart, Bill Edwards, Bill Kennedy, George Slocum and John Laurenz. It was released on November 2, 1950, by Eagle-Lion Films.

== Plot ==
Cattlemen are being terrorized by an organized gang of rustlers. The thieves sell the stolen livestock to a mysterious masked malefactor known as the Phantom Rider. Undercover government agent Mike Hoskins enlists the aid of Spade Cooley when it becomes apparent that the Phantom is one of the guests at the man's dude ranch.

== Cast ==
- Spade Cooley as Spade Cooley
- Maria Hart as Jill Kimball
- Bill Edwards as Mike Hoskins
- Bill Kennedy as Carson
- George Slocum as Hal Turner
- John Laurenz as Kevin
- Douglas Wood as Kimball
- Bud Osborne as Sheriff Banyon
- Johnny Carpenter as Keller
