= Kansas Territory (film) =

1952 film

- Theatrical film poster
- Directed by: Lewis D. Collins
- Written by: Daniel B. Ullman
- Produced by: Vincent M. Fennelly
- Starring: Wild Bill Elliott; House Peters Jr. Peggy Stewart
- Cinematography: Ernest Miller
- Edited by: Richard V. Heermance
- Music by: Raoul Kraushaar
- Production company: Frontier Pictures
- Distributed by: Monogram Pictures
- Release date: May 4, 1952
- Running time: 65 minutes
- Country: United States
- Language: English

Kansas Territory is a 1952 American Western film directed by Lewis D. Collins and starring Wild Bill Elliott, House Peters Jr. and Peggy Stewart. It was partly shot at the Iverson Ranch. The film's sets were designed by the art director Dave Milton.

== Cast ==
- Wild Bill Elliott as Joe Daniels
- House Peters Jr. as Ralph Carruthers
- Peggy Stewart as Kay Collins
- Lane Bradford as Fred Jethro
- I. Stanford Jolley as Slater
- Fuzzy Knight as Cap
- Stanley Andrews as Governor
- Marshall Reed as Deputy Bob Jethro
- Terry Frost as Henchman Stark
- John Hart as U.S. Marshal Matt Furness
- William Fawcett as Old Man Weatherbee
- Lee Roberts as Arthur Larkin
- Pierce Lyden as Dr. Stanley Johnson
- Ted Adams as Ed Rank
