= Masterson of Kansas =

1954 film by William Castle

- Theatrical release poster
- Directed by: William Castle
- Screenplay by: Douglas Heyes
- Produced by: Sam Katzman
- Starring: George Montgomery; Nancy Gates; James Griffith
- Cinematography: Henry Freulich
- Edited by: Henry Batista
- Music by: Mischa Bakaleinikoff
- Color process: Technicolor
- Production company: Sam Katzman Productions
- Distributed by: Columbia Pictures
- Release date: December 1, 1954
- Running time: 73 minutes
- Country: United States
- Language: English

Masterson of Kansas is a 1954 American Western film directed by William Castle and starring George Montgomery, Nancy Gates and James Griffith. It was produced by Sam Katzman for distribution for Columbia Pictures.

== Plot ==
Bat Masterson is a gunslinger. Masterson, Wyatt Earp and Doc Holliday come together in a common cause. The three intend to protect an impending land exchange between honest rancher Merrick and peace-seeking Indian chief Yellow Hawk against the crooked chicanery of land baron Clay Bennett.

== Cast ==
- George Montgomery as Bat Masterson
- Nancy Gates as Amy Merrick
- James Griffith as Doc Holliday
- Jean Willes as Dallas Corey aka Mrs. Bennett
- Benny Rubin as Coroner
- William Henry as Charlie Fry
- David Bruce as Clay Bennett
- Bruce Cowling as Wyatt Earp
- Gregg Barton as Henchman Sutton
- Donald Murphy as Virgil Earp
- Gregg Martell as Mitch Connors
- Sandy Sanders as Henchman Tyler
- Jay Silverheels as Yellow Hawk
- John Maxwell as Amos Merrick
