= Virginia Herrick =

American actress and opera soprano

- Born: Virginia Herrick; June 13, 1916; Elwha, Washington
- Died: January 29, 2016 (aged 99); Provo, Utah
- Resting place: Cedar City Cemetery, Cedar City, Utah
- Occupation: Film actress
- Spouse: Omar V Garrison
- Parents: Henry Bert Herrick (father); Elizabeth B. Casner Herrick (mother)

Virginia Herrick (June 13, 1916 – January 29, 2016) was an American film and television actress and an opera soprano.

== Filmography ==
=== Films ===
- The Frontier Phantom (1952) - Susan
- Secrets of Beauty (1951) - Betty Westmore
- Montana Desperado (1951) - Sally Wilson
- Roar of the Iron Horse (1951) - Carol Lane
- Silver Raiders (1950) - Patricia Jones
- I Killed Geronimo (1950) - Julie Scott
- Vigilante Hideout (1950) - Marigae Sanders

=== TV ===
- Cowboy G-Men (1953)
- The Cisco Kid (1951–1952)
- The Gene Autry Show (1950)
