= Cattle Queen =

1951 movie

- Directed by: Robert Emmett Tansey
- Written by: Robert Emmett Tansey; Frances Kavanaugh
- Produced by: Johnny Carpenter; Karl Johnson; Jack Schwarz; Jack Seaman
- Starring: Maria Hart; Drake Smith; William Fawcett
- Cinematography: Elmer Dyer
- Edited by: Richard C. Currier
- Music by: Darrell Calker
- Production company: Jack Schwarz Productions
- Distributed by: Eagle-Lion Classics
- Release date: November 15, 1951
- Running time: 72 minutes
- Country: United States
- Language: English

Cattle Queen is a 1951 American Western film directed by Robert Emmett Tansey and starring Maria Hart, Drake Smith and William Fawcett.

It was shot at the Iverson Ranch. Sets were designed by the art director Vin Taylor. It was one of the final films released by the independent distributor Eagle-Lion.

== Plot ==
A female ranch owner employs three ex-convicts in an attempt to clean up a lawless town.

== Cast ==
- Maria Hart as Queenie Hart
- Drake Smith as Bill Foster
- William Fawcett as Alkali
- Robert Gardett as Duke Drake
- Johnny Carpenter as The Tucson Kid
- Edward Clark as Doc Hodges
- Emile Meyer as Shotgun Thompson
- James Pierce as Bad Bill Smith
- Joe Bailey as Blackie Malone
- Douglas Wood as Judge Whipple - Bartender
- Alyn Lockwood as Rosa - Saloon Girl
- I. Stanford Jolley as Scarface - Outlaw Leader
- Lane Chandler as Marshal Houston
- William Bailey as Warden
- Frank Marlowe as Stage Driver
- Roger Anderson as Lefty - Henchman
- Vern Teters as Trig - Henchman
- Steve Conte as Mac - Henchman
- Robert Robinson as Armstrong - Cattle Buyer

== Bibliography ==
- Pitts, Michael R. Western Movies: A Guide to 5,105 Feature Films. McFarland, 2012.
