= Utah Wagon Train =

1951 film by Philip Ford

- Theatrical release poster
- Directed by: Philip Ford
- Screenplay by: John K. Butler
- Produced by: Melville Tucker
- Starring: Rex Allen; Penny Edwards; Buddy Ebsen; Roy Barcroft; Sarah Padden; Grant Withers
- Cinematography: John MacBurnie
- Edited by: Edward Schroeder
- Music by: Stanley Wilson
- Production company: Republic Pictures
- Distributed by: Republic Pictures
- Release date: October 15, 1951
- Running time: 67 minutes
- Country: United States
- Language: English

Utah Wagon Train is a 1951 American Western film directed by Philip Ford, written by John K. Butler and starring Rex Allen, Penny Edwards, Buddy Ebsen, Roy Barcroft, Sarah Padden and Grant Withers. It was released on October 15, 1951 by Republic Pictures.

== Cast ==
- Rex Allen as Rex Allen
- Koko as Koko
- Penny Edwards as Nancy Bonner
- Buddy Ebsen as Snooper
- Roy Barcroft as Henchman Hank Driscoll
- Sarah Padden as Sarah Wendover
- Grant Withers as Red Bancroft
- Arthur Space as Robert Hatfield
- Edwin Rand as Jess Sutton
- Robert Karnes as Henchman Jack Scully
- William Holmes as Henchman Pete Millan
- Stanley Andrews as Sheriff
- Frank Jenks as Hap
- Al Bridge as Sam Sickle
- Forrest Taylor as Cyrus Bonner
- Louis Mason as Hotel Clerk
- Peggy Walker as Mrs. Emily Sutton
- Adrienne Marden as Mrs. Belle Hatfield
