= Montana Desperado =

1951 American Western film

- Directed by: Wallace Fox
- Written by: Daniel B. Ullman
- Produced by: Vincent M. Fennelly
- Starring: Johnny Mack Brown; Myron Healey; Virginia Herrick
- Cinematography: Gilbert Warrenton
- Edited by: Fred Maguire
- Music by: Edward J. Kay
- Production company: Frontier Pictures
- Distributed by: Monogram Pictures
- Release date: June 17, 1951
- Running time: 51 minutes
- Country: United States
- Language: English

Montana Desperado is a 1951 American Western film directed by Wallace Fox and starring Johnny Mack Brown, Myron Healey and Virginia Herrick.

== Cast ==
- Johnny Mack Brown as Johnny Mack Brown
- Myron Healey as Ron Logan
- Virginia Herrick as Sally Wilson
- Lee Roberts as Hal Jackson
- Steve Clark as Sheriff Ben
- Edmund Cobb as Jim Berry

== Bibliography ==
- Martin, Len D. The Allied Artists Checklist: The Feature Films and Short Subjects of Allied Artists Pictures Corporation, 1947-1978. McFarland & Company, 1993.
