= I Killed Geronimo =

1950 film by John Hoffman

- Theatrical release poster
- Directed by: John Hoffman
- Written by: Sam Neuman; Nat Tanchuck
- Produced by: Jack Rabin
- Starring: James Ellison; Virginia Herrick; Chief Thundercloud
- Cinematography: Elmer Dyer; Clark Ramsey
- Edited by: Norman Colbert
- Music by: Darrell Calker
- Production company: Jack Schwarz Productions
- Distributed by: Eagle-Lion Films
- Release date: August 8, 1950
- Running time: 62 minutes
- Country: United States
- Language: English

I Killed Geronimo is a 1950 American Western directed by John Hoffman and starring James Ellison, Virginia Herrick and Chief Thundercloud in the role of the Chiricahua Apache leader Geronimo. It is based on the fictional murder of Geronimo, who in reality died of pneumonia at the age of 79 after a fall from his horse in February 1909 while still a prisoner of the United States at Fort Sill, Oklahoma.

== Cast ==
- James Ellison as Capt. Jeff Packard
- Virginia Herrick as Julie Scott
- Chief Thundercloud as Geronimo
- Smith Ballew as Lt. Furness
- Luther Crockett as Maj. Clem French
- Jean Andren as Mrs. French
- Ted Adams as Walt Anderson
- Myron Healey as Frank Corcoran
- Dennis Moore as Luke
- Wes Hudman as Red (as Wesley Hudman)
- Harte Wayne as Gen. Ives
