= Roar of the Iron Horse =

1951 film by Spencer Gordon Bennet, Thomas Carr

- Theatrical release poster
- Directed by: Spencer Gordon Bennet; Thomas Carr
- Written by: George H. Plympton; Sherman L. Lowe; Royal K. Cole
- Produced by: Sam Katzman
- Starring: Jock Mahoney
- Narrated by: Knox Manning
- Cinematography: Fayte Brown
- Edited by: Earl Turner
- Color process: Black and white
- Production company: Sam Katzman Productions
- Distributed by: Columbia Pictures
- Release date: May 31, 1951
- Running time: 260 minutes (15 episodes)
- Country: United States
- Language: English

Roar of the Iron Horse is a 1951 American Western Serial film directed by Spencer Gordon Bennet and Thomas Carr and starring Jock Mahoney and Virginia Herrick.

== Plot ==
A railroad agent named Jim Grant opposes hard-nosed German, Karl Ulrich, called The Baron. Head of a strong ring in America, the infamous Baron was thwarted time and time again as he tried to sabotage the building of the transcontinental railroad with all the means to his scope, strategically bribing the local Indians into doing his dirty work.

== Cast ==
- Jock Mahoney as Jim Grant (as Jock O'Mahoney)
- Virginia Herrick as Carol Lane
- William Fawcett as Rocky
- Harold Landon as Tom Lane (as Hal Landon)
- Jack Ingram as Homer Lathrop
- Mickey Simpson as Cal - Henchman
- George Eldredge as Karl Ulrich- aka The Baron
- Myron Healey as Ace -Henchman [Chs.3,4,6,9,10,15]
- Rusty Wescoatt as Scully - Lathrop's Foreman
- Frank Ellis as Bat - Henchman
- Pierce Lyden as Erv Hopkins - Henchman
- Dick Curtis as Campo - The Baron's Chief Gunman
- Hugh Prosser as Lefty - Henchman [Chs.1-4,7-9]

== Critical reception ==
Cline writes that Roar of the Iron Horse was an outstanding release of 1951.

== Chapter titles ==
1. Indian Attack
2. Captured by Redskins
3. Trapped by Outlaws
4. In the Baron's Stronghold
5. A Ride for Life
6. White Indians
7. Fumes of Fate
8. Midnight Marauders
9. Raid of the Pay Train
10. Trapped on a Trestle
11. Redskin's Revenge
12. Plunge of Peril
13. The Law Takes Over
14. When Killers Meet
15. The End of the Trail

_{Source:}

== See also ==
- List of film serials by year
- List of film serials by studio

| Preceded by Pirates of the High Seas (1950) | Columbia Serial; Roar of the Iron Horse (1951) | Succeeded by Mysterious Island (1951) |
