= Ambush (1950 film) =

1950 film by Sam Wood

- Film poster
- Directed by: Sam Wood
- Screenplay by: Marguerite Roberts
- Based on: Ambush; 1948 story in The Saturday Evening Post by Luke Short
- Produced by: Armand Deutsch, Sam Wood
- Starring: Robert Taylor; John Hodiak; Arlene Dahl
- Cinematography: Harold Lipstein
- Edited by: Ben Lewis
- Music by: Rudolph G. Kopp
- Color process: Black and white
- Production company: Metro-Goldwyn-Mayer
- Distributed by: Metro-Goldwyn-Mayer
- Release date: December 21, 1949
- Running time: 89 minutes
- Country: United States
- Language: English
- Budget: $1,754,000
- Box office: $3,215,000

Ambush is a 1950 American MGM Western film starring Robert Taylor, John Hodiak and Arlene Dahl and directed by Sam Wood, his final film in a career that spanned more than 30 years

The film is based on the serial story Ambush by Luke Short that was published in The Saturday Evening Post from December 25, 1948 to February 12, 1949.

Principal photography occurred on location at the Corriganville Ranch in Simi Valley, California. Additional location work took place in and around Gallup, New Mexico.

Ambush was the first MGM film released in the 1950s

== Plot ==
In 1878, Ward Kinsman, an Indian scout turned prospector, has been persuaded by the U.S. Cavalry to find Mary Carlyle, the daughter of a general, who has been kidnapped by Apache Indians. He returns to town to find the strict Major Lorrison is in charge, having taken command from Kinsman's good friend, an injured colonel. He also meets the curvaceous Ann Carlyle, Mary's sister and Lorrison's fiancée.

On the trail with a few cavalrymen and Ann, they find an Apache encampment. Ward learns from an Apache woman that Mary has been taken by a chief named Diablito. Returning to the cavalry fort with Tana, a captive who had refused to either fight or flee, preparations are made for a full-scale expedition to find Diablito and capture or destroy him and his fellow tribesmen.

Captain Lorrison proposes marriage to Ann, but she postpones a decision. Ann tells Ward that she intends to accept his proposal, but she admits to Ward that she is not in love with him.

The expedition to find Diablito begins. Tana disappears to warn Diablito, but Ward kills him before he can. Eventually the trackers come across Diablito's camp and stampede the horses, and a gun battle ensues. A cavalry reinforcement column arrives and routs the Indians. Ward rescues Mary and Lorrison pursues a small band of escaping warriors, who ambush and decimate their pursuers. After killing Lorrison, Diablito plays dead, lying in wait for Ward, who had previously captured and returned him to a reservation. Sensing a setup, Ward leads Diablito to reveal himself and kills him.

Mary and Ann are reunited back at the fort. Ann concedes that Ward was right and that many lives would be lost while attempting to save just one. He acknowledges that someone had to stop Diablito, and Lorrison was willing to pay that price.

== Cast ==
- Robert Taylor as Ward Kinsman
- Arlene Dahl as Ann Duverall
- John Hodiak as Capt. Ben Lorrison
- Don Taylor as Lt. Linus Delaney
- Jean Hagen as Martha Conovan
- Bruce Cowling as Tom Conovan
- Leon Ames as Maj. Breverly
- John McIntire as Frank Holly
- Pat Moriarity as Sgt. Mack
- Charles Stevens as Diablito
- Chief Thundercloud as Tana
- Ray Teal as Capt. Wolverson
- Robin Short as Lt. Storrow
- Richard Bailey as Lt. Tremaine

== Reception ==
In a contemporary review for The New York Times, critic Bosley Crowther called Ambush "a super-dupe horse opera" and wrote:

This rather conventional demonstration of a hero's superiority appears to have been worked out with great care by the people at M-G-M. ... Why the potential Mr. Taylor is put in this strangely lofty light in a highly involved and talky Western is a secret of M-G-M. Certainly it does not enhance him in the eyes of his eager fans, and it doesn't contribute character to a generally undistinguished script. ... [T]he action, though fast towards the finish, is decidedly meager in this film, and Mr. Taylor is flat tire as a hero. We prefer him as Billy the Kid.

Reviewer Mae Tinée of the Chicago Tribune wrote: "The script is more verbose than is usual in westerns, but contains a good bit of quiet humor, and the backgrounds are ruggedly handsome. ... The film starts with a rather halting pace, but works up to a crackling finale."

According to MGM records, the film earned $2,108,000 in the U.S. and Canada and $1,107,000 overseas, resulting in a $401,000 profit.
