= Bruce Cowling =

American actor (1919–1986)

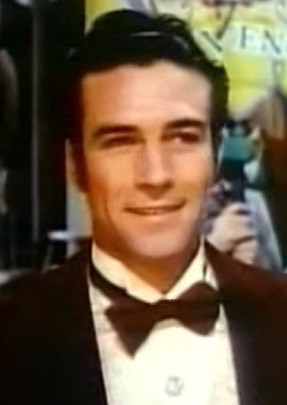
- from the film Till the Clouds Roll By (1946)
- Born: October 30, 1919; Coweta, Oklahoma, U.S.
- Died: August 22, 1986 (aged 66)
- Years active: 1946–1961

Bruce Cowling (October 30, 1919 – August 22, 1986 ) was a film and television actor in the 1940s and 1950s.

== Biography ==
Cowling was born in Coweta, Oklahoma, the son of Mr. and Mrs. L. A. Cowling. His father was a telegrapher. He grew up in Coweta and graduated from Porter High School. Later he and his parents moved to Eufaula. Cowling attended the University of Arkansas and played football there. During his summers in college he was a telegrapher, and in World War II he was a radio operator in the United States Army Signal Corps.

Cowling appeared in twenty films including Song of the Thin Man (1947), Battleground (1949), Ambush (1950), The Painted Hills (1951), Gun Belt (1953) as Virgil Earp and To Hell and Back (1955).

He voiced several characters on the Lone Ranger radio show and also made several appearances in different roles on The Loretta Young Show. He played Brady on "Have Gun Will Travel" S1 E31 "Hey Boy's Revenge" which aired 4/11/1958.

== Filmography ==
Year	Title	Role	Notes
1946	Till the Clouds Roll By	Steve Baker	(segment "Show Boat"), Uncredited
1947	The Beginning or the End	Enola Gay Ground Crewman	Uncredited
1947	It Happened in Brooklyn	Soldier	Uncredited
1947	High Barbaree	Captain	Uncredited
1947	Dark Delusion	Dr. Williams	Uncredited
1947	The Romance of Rosy Ridge	Clancy	Uncredited
1947	Song of the Thin Man	Phil Orval Brant	
1948	The Pirate	Guard	Uncredited
1948	Command Decision	Operations Officer	Uncredited
1949	The Stratton Story	Ted Lyons	
1949	Battleground	Wolowicz	
1950	Ambush	Tom Conovan	
1950	A Lady Without Passport	Archer Delby James, Pilot	
1950	Devil's Doorway	Lt. Grimes	
1951	Cause for Alarm!	Dr. Ranney Grahame	
1951	The Painted Hills	Lin Taylor	
1951	Westward the Women	The Cat	Uncredited
1952	The Battle at Apache Pass	Neil Baylor	
1953	Gun Belt	Virgil Earp	
1954	Cannibal Attack	Rovak	
1954	Masterson of Kansas	Wyatt Earp	
1955	To Hell and Back	Capt. Marks	
1956	Perry Mason	Joe Bradford	"The Case of the Crooked Candle"
