= The Bushwhackers (1952 film) =

1952 film

- Film poster
- Directed by: Rod Amateau
- Screenplay by: Tom Gries (as Thomas S. Gries); Rod Amateau
- Produced by: Larry Finley
- Starring: John Ireland; Wayne Morris; Lawrence Tierney; Dorothy Malone; Lon Chaney Jr. Myrna Dell
- Cinematography: Joseph F. Biroc
- Edited by: Francis D. Lyon
- Music by: Albert Glasser
- Production company: Jack Broder Productions
- Distributed by: Realart Pictures
- Release date: January 8, 1952
- Running time: 70 minutes
- Country: United States
- Language: English

The Bushwhackers is a 1952 American Western film directed by Rod Amateau and starring John Ireland, Wayne Morris, Lawrence Tierney, Dorothy Malone, Lon Chaney Jr. and Myrna Dell.

== Plot ==
Tired of killing, war veteran Jefferson Waring rides West, but in Missouri he sees squatters killed by men working for the rich, ruthless Artemus Taylor.

Jeff spends the night at Independence newspaperman Peter Sharpe's place but is jailed when Sharpe's daughter Cathy finds him in her room. Marshal John Harding (one of many men on Taylor's payroll) sends for the Sharpe's who explain the mistake and Jeff is released is.

Jeff stays in town and sees what is going on in the area, attends a squatters funeral and gets into a fight with some of Taylor's men. What he sees makes him decide to leave and continue west.

Banker Justin Stone threatens to repossess Sharpe's newspaper unless he takes Taylor's side against squatters settling in the region. The blind and wheelchair-bound Taylor, his ambitious daughter Norah and Stone are aware that railroad surveyors are considering laying tracks nearby, so they want all of the land for themselves.

Jeff leaves town, but Norah and her employee Ding Bell intercept him. Norah shoots at Jeff but misses. She and Bell take Jeff to see Artemus, who explains that since Jeff now knows about the railroad he needs to disappear. Artemus instructs Bell to take Jeff to a remote canyon and murder him. Norah, figuring that Ding is to soft to kill Jeff in cold blood, instructs Artemus's chief thug, Sam Tobin, to follow Bell and Jeff to murder them. Tobin wounds Jeff and mortally wounds Bell. Bell kills Tobin as he dies himself.

While the settlers are having a meeting discussing the murders of homesteaders Jeff, wounded, arrives at the house they are gathered in and explains about the railroad to those at the meeting. Marshal Harding interrupts the meeting and charges Jeff with the two murders and takes him to jail.

Two of Taylor's thugs assail Peter which makes him decide to take the side of the settlers and he publishes a paper that calls out Taylor and his cohorts. As the situation escalates Jeff escapes from jail (with the marshals help) and helps organize a group of settlers to resist Taylor's planned attack. The settlers set an ambush and slaughter Taylor's thugs (who were led by Norah). Jeff heads to Taylor's ranch and confront him with the news that his plan failed. Taylor dies of a heart attack upon hearing the news.

Norah, having escaped the ambush, rides to town. She goes to Stone looking to withdraw her savings and make a getaway. Stone tries to cheat her and she shoots him. As she is leaving with her money she is killed by a mortally wounded Stone. Jeff decides to remain in town to operate the newspaper with Cathy.

== Cast ==
- John Ireland as Jefferson Waring
- Wayne Morris as Marshal John Harding
- Lawrence Tierney as Sam Tobin
- Dorothy Malone as Cathy Sharpe
- Lon Chaney Jr. as Artemus Taylor
- Myrna Dell as Norah Taylor
- Frank Marlowe as Peter Sharpe
- William Holmes as Ding Bell
- Jack Elam as Cree
- Ward Wood as Second Henchman
- Charles Trowbridge as Justin Stone
- Norman Leavitt as Deputy Yale
- Stuart Randall as Slocum
- George Lynn as Guthrie
- Gordon Wynn as John Quigley
- Gabriel Conrad as Kramer
- Eddie Parks as Funeral Franklin
- Bob Broder as Tommy Lloyd

== Production ==
The Bushwhackers was filmed at the Jack Ingram Movie Ranch in September 1951. It was one of a series of Westerns featuring Dorothy Malone.

== Reception ==
In a contemporary review for the Citizen-News of Hollywood, critic Lowell E. Redelings wrote: "As Westerns go, 'The Bushwackers' [sic] is not the best of recent adventure dramas. There's too much talk. for one thing, and the plot is a bit too obvious. The characterizations help some. ... The photography is on the seamy side, and the directing leaves a whole lot to he desired."
