= House Peters Jr. =

American actor (1916–2008)

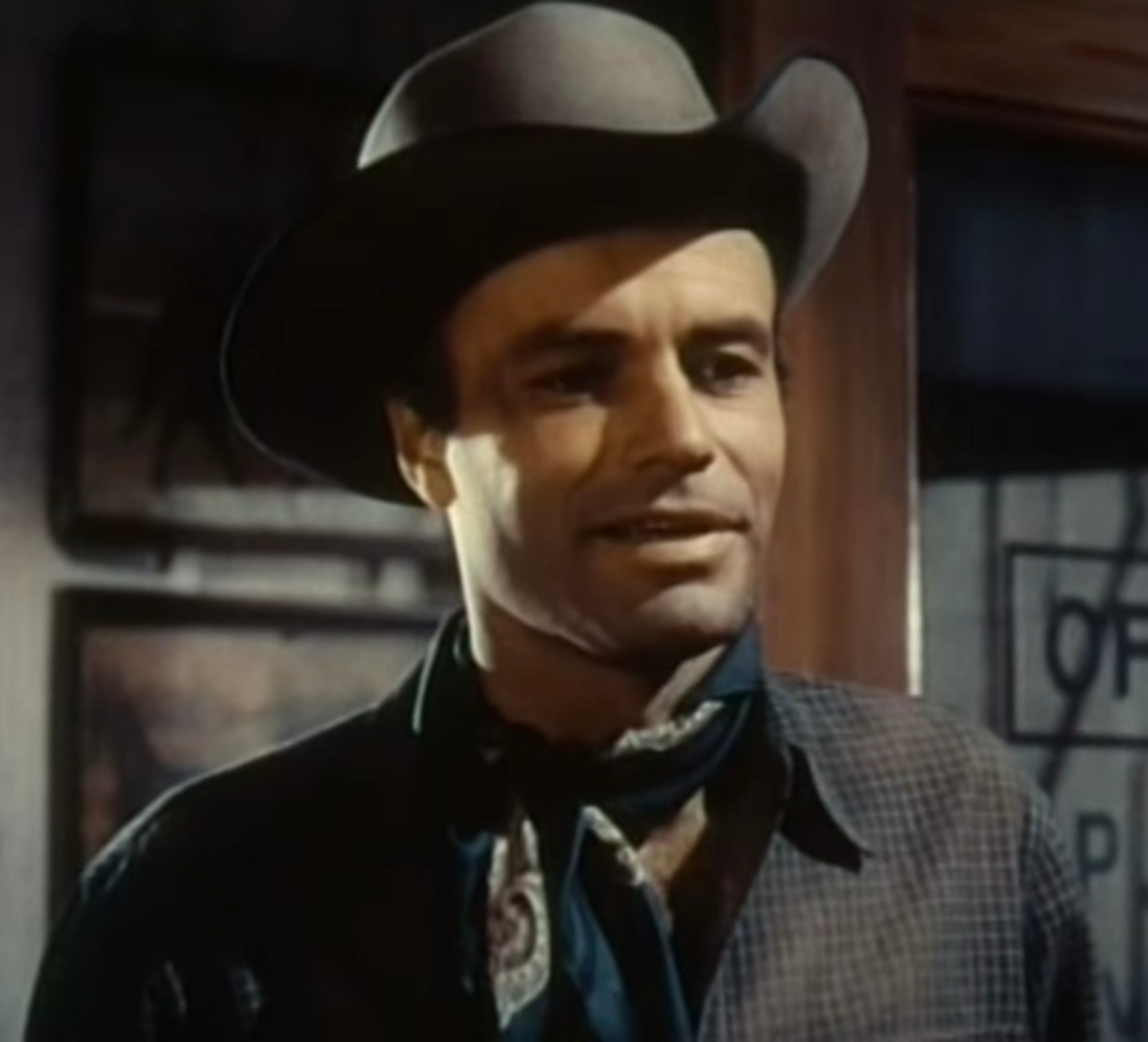
- Peters in Under California Stars (1948)
- Born: Robert House Peters Jr. January 12, 1916; New Rochelle, New York, U.S.
- Died: October 1, 2008 (aged 92); Los Angeles, California, U.S.
- Occupation: Actor
- Years active: 1935–1966
- Spouse: Lucy Pickett (m. 1946)
- Children: 3

Robert House Peters Jr. (January 12, 1916 – October 1, 2008) was an American character actor most noted for his roles in 1950s B movies and westerns. He also served as the face and body of Mr. Clean in the Procter and Gamble cleaning product commercials of the era.

== Biography ==
Peters was born in New Rochelle, New York to actors House Peters, a major leading man in the silent era, and Mae King. He grew up in Beverly Hills, California and graduated from Beverly Hills High School.

In a career that spanned 1935–1967, he appeared in many films, primarily as the "heavy," or villain. He appeared in television series including Perry Mason, Bat Masterson, Gunsmoke, The Twilight Zone and Lassie.

From the late 1950s into the 1960s, Peters Jr. played Mr. Clean in television commercials for the product.

Peters served in the United States Army Air Forces' Air Sea Rescue section as a small-boat operator during World War II. He was married to Lucy Pickett from 1946 until his death; they had three children. He died of pneumonia at the Motion Picture and Television Fund Hospital in Los Angeles, California.

Peters wrote a memoir, "Another Side of Hollywood,” published by Empire Publishing of Madison, North Carolina in the year 2000. It is an entertaining, interesting look at the early days of Hollywood movie and television production with many black and white photos.

== Filmography ==
Film
Year	Title	Role	Notes
1935	Hot Tip	Racetrack Spectator	Uncredited
1935	Three Kids and a Queen	Reporter	Uncredited
1936	The Adventures of Frank Merriwell	House Peters	Serial
1936	Flash Gordon	Shark Man	Serial, [Chs. 3-4]
1936	Yellowstone	Ranger	Uncredited
1936	Ace Drummond	Pete - Second Pilot / Clipper Pilot	Serial, [Ch. 1], [Ch. 8] Uncredited
1936	Four Days' Wonder	Chauffeur	Uncredited
1937	Windjammer	Bob - Sailor	Uncredited
1937	Public Cowboy No. 1	Jim Shannon	
1937	Life Begins in College	Reporter	Uncredited
1937	All American Sweetheart	Eddie	Uncredited
1937	Wells Fargo	Minor Role	Uncredited
1938	Start Cheering	Football Playing Student	Uncredited
1939	Frontier Pony Express	Lieutenant Trent	Uncredited
1941	Sea Raiders	Agent Burke	Serial, [Ch. 4], Uncredited
1947	Danger Street	Magazine Staffer	Uncredited
1948	Oklahoma Badlands	The Dude	
1948	Dangers of the Canadian Mounted	Ford - Henchman	Uncredited
1948	Under California Stars	Henchman Ed	
1948	Desperadoes of Dodge City	Henry	
1948	Adventures of Frank and Jesse James	Sheriff Towey	Serial, [Chs. 1–2, 5–6, 11]
1948	The Plunderers	Sentinel	Uncredited
1948	Gunning for Justice	Kirk Wheeler - Henchman	
1948	Courtin' Trouble	Burt Larsen	
1948	Renegades of Sonora	Courier	
1949	Rose of the Yukon		Uncredited
1949	Outlaw Country	Cal Saunders	
1949	Sheriff of Wichita	Deputy Jack Thorpe	
1949	Son of Billy the Kid	Yantis Henchman	Uncredited
1949	Batman and Robin	Henchman Earl	Serial, [Chs. 7-15]
1949	King of the Rocket Men	Burt Winslow	Serial
1949	The Gal Who Took the West	Trooper	Uncredited
1949	Love Happy	Clergyman in Sadie Thompson Number	Uncredited
1950	Over the Border	Wade Shelton	
1950	Cow Town	Gill Saunders	
1950	Twilight in the Sierras	Jim Williams	
1950	Hi-Jacked	Hank	
1950	Border Treasure	Rod	
1951	Three Desperate Men	Dick Cable	
1951	Gene Autry and the Mounties	Henchman Hogan	Uncredited
1951	Spoilers of the Plains	Henchman Scheller	
1951	Man from Sonora	Ed Hooper	
1951	Blazing Bullets	Bill Grant	
1951	Lorna Doone	Patrol Leader	Uncredited
1951	The Dakota Kid	Sam Dawson	
1951	The Day the Earth Stood Still	MP captain	Uncredited
1951	The Red Badge of Courage	Passing Soldier - Veteran	Uncredited
1952	The Old West	Henchman Mike	
1952	Waco	Doctor	
1952	Oklahoma Annie	Jim Tullett	
1952	Kansas Territory	Ralph Carruthers	
1952	Red Planet Mars	Dr. Boulting	Uncredited
1952	The Lion and the Horse	'Rocky' Steuber	
1952	And Now Tomorrow		
1952	Carson City	Miner	Uncredited
1952	Hellgate	Witness	Uncredited
1952	Fargo	Bill Martin's Brother	Uncredited
1952	Kansas City Confidential	Policeman	Uncredited
1952	Wyoming Roundup	Kent Randolph	
1953	Winning of the West	Marshal Jim Hackett	
1953	The Man Behind the Gun	Sheldon's Henchman at Hideout	Uncredited
1953	Port Sinister	Jim Garry	Alternative title: Beast of Paradise Isle
1954	Highway Dragnet	Steve	
1954	Overland Pacific	Perkins	Uncredited
1954	Target Earth	Technician	
1955	Strategic Air Command	Captain	Uncredited
1955	Rebel Without a Cause	Officer at Police Station	Uncredited
1956	The Women of Pitcairn Island	Coggins	
1957	Man Afraid	Detective	Uncredited
1957	Johnny Tremain	Patriot Commander at Lexington	Uncredited
1957	House of Numbers	Patrolman	Uncredited
1957	Black Patch	Holman	
1958	Man from God's Country	Curt Warren	
1959	Inside the Mafia	Marty Raven	Uncredited
1959	Ordeal at Dry Red		
1960	The Big Night	Robert Shaw	
1962	Terror at Black Falls	Sheriff Cal	
1962	Who's Got the Action?	Cop in Elevator	Uncredited
1964	Rio Conchos	Major Johnson	
1965	The Great Sioux Massacre	Reporter	
Television
Year	Title	Role	Notes
1950	The Gene Autry Show	Various roles	3 episodes
1953	Death Valley Days		Season 1, Episode 18 "Land of the Free"
1950–1957	The Lone Ranger	Various roles	12 episodes
1951–1953	The Range Rider	Various roles	6 episodes
1954–1956	Annie Oakley	Various roles	4 episodes
1955	The Adventures of Champion	Ote Bledsoe	1 episode
1955	The Life and Legend of Wyatt Earp	Dave Bennett	4 episodes
1955	You are There	Bruce Greeves	1 episodes
1957	The Gray Ghost	Hollingshead	1 episode
1958	Broken Arrow	Captain Rowan	1 episode
1959	Bat Masterson	Town Marshall	"Shakedown at St. Joe"
1959	Buckskin	Pat Devlin	1 episode
1959	Gunsmoke	Nat Swan	"The Coward" (S4E26)
1960	The Twilight Zone	Policeman	1 episode
1961	Lawman	Joe Poole	1 episode
1962	77 Sunset Strip	Sheriff Goodson	1 episode
1956–1966	Lassie	Sheriff Jim Billings	12 episodes, (final appearance)
