= John War Eagle =

American actor

John War Eagle aka John Henry St. Pierre
- Born: September 24, 1901; Yankton Indian Reservation, South Dakota, United States
- Died: June 21, 1977 (aged 75); California, United States
- Other names: Chief John War Eagle; Chief John Eagle; John Wareagle
- Occupation: Actor
- Years active: 1932–1977

John Henry St Pierre, a.k.a. John War Eagle (September 24, 1901 – June 21, 1977) was a Yankton Sioux film and television actor. He was born September 24, 1901, in Wagner, Charles Mix, South Dakota. He was of the Sioux people, and was raised on the Yankton Indian Reservation in South Dakota.

== Career ==
Between 1932 and 1977 — sometimes credited as Chief John War Eagle, Chief John Eagle or John Wareagle — he appeared in twenty-eight films, mostly in uncredited roles, and twenty-six television productions.

His roles include appearing as Red Cloud in the historical western-drama film Tomahawk (1951) starring Van Heflin, a role he reprised in 1953 in historical western-drama film The Great Sioux Uprising starring Jeff Chandler. He also played Chief Sitting Bull in the Disney family adventure western-drama film Tonka (1958), the story of a young Sioux boy, played by Sal Mineo on the brink of adulthood who tries to tame a wild stallion to prove his courage and strength.

War Eagle also appeared as Wolf's Brother in the Disney western-drama film Westward Ho, the Wagons! (1956) and in “The Jeremy Dow Story” (S4E14) as revengeful “Chief Iron Hand” in the TV Western Wagon Train (1960).
