= William Holmes (actor) =

American actor

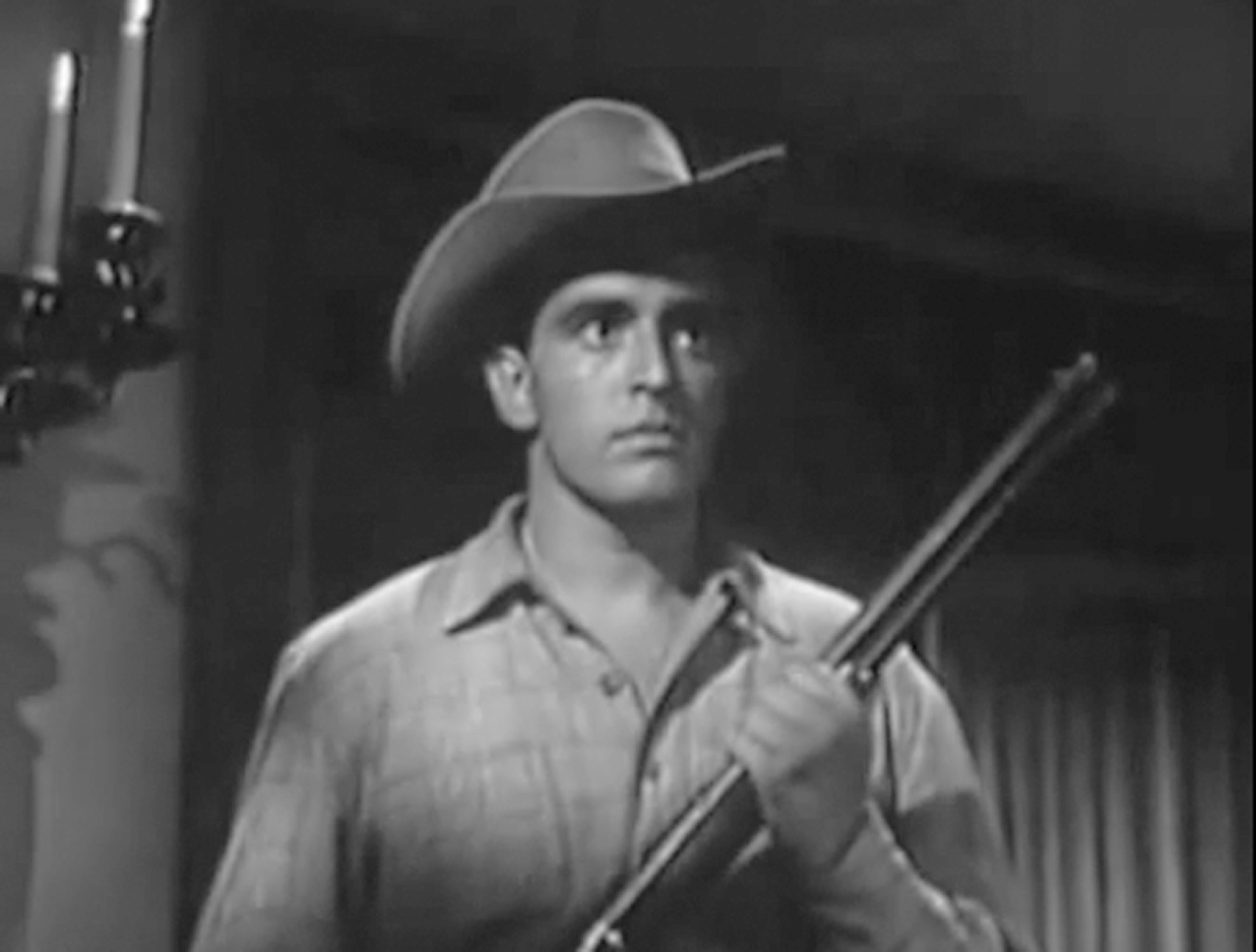
Holmes in The Bushwackers

William Holmes is an American actor known for Daughter of the Sun God (1962), The Bushwhackers (1951), and In Old Amarillo (1951).

== Career ==
Holmes, heir to the Fleischmann's Yeast fortune, wanted to be an actor, so his father footed the bill for him to star in the early 1950s film Daughter of the Sun God. The movie was so bad, however, that it took nearly a decade for it to be released. By that time, the actor was already out of the business.

In 1950, he acted in the musical Careless Rapture at the Dudley Hippodrome in Dudley, West Midlands, England, with Barry Sinclair, Mary Allen, Arthur Hosking, Muriel Barron, Joan Norman, and Charles Gillespie in the cast.

Louella Parsons wrote that Holmes would have the top role in the film Cocobolo, directed by Henry Herts and produced by Robert Peters.

In 1953, Hedda Hopper reported "he has a children's book to be published, and will do a TV adventure series".

== Personal life ==
Holmes was romantically attached to Dorothy Malone in 1953. Hedda Hopper wrote, "Bill Holmes, the yeast heir, is devoting his time to writing, acting, and Dorothy Malone. Friends expect the pair to marry in December". Holmes and Malone did not marry.

Holmes was married to Shirley Buchanan. Mike Connolly reported that Holmes would marry Nancy Valentine in 1956, following Buchanan's Reno divorce.

== Filmography ==
Year	Title	Role	Notes
1935	Frisco Kid	Second Man	Uncredited
1945	The Picture of Dorian Gray	Club Member	Uncredited
1947	The Sea of Grass	Gambler	Uncredited
1951	In Old Amarillo	Henchman Martin	
1951	Utah Wagon Train	Henchman Pete Millan	
1951	The Cisco Kid	Henchman	2 episodes
1952	The Bushwhackers	'Ding' Bell	(as Bill Holmes)
1959	The Lawless Years	Gooby	Episode: "The Immigrant"
1962	Daughter of the Sun God	Kent	(final film role)
