= Maria Hart =

American actress

Maria Hart (née Barbara Ann McGhee; May 28, 1923 in Los Angeles, California – August 9, 2012, Canoga Park, California ) was an American actress and singer.

== Biography ==
She was born as Barbara Ann McGhee on May 28, 1923 to Edna and James William McGhee.

She left grand opera and light opera to perform in films after touring in The Desert Song and singing in The Masked Ball and Pagliacci in Los Angeles. She had roles in The Fighting Stallion (1950) and Border Outlaws (1950). She starred in the movie Cattle Queen (1951); and co-starred in Outlaw Women (1952) and The Lusty Men (1952).

== Marriages ==
Hart was married to movie producer Jack Seaman until their divorce in 1948; they had daughter, Rosalind Jill Seaman. Hart also had a daughter, Georgianna, by a previous marriage. Jack Seaman was Hart's producer for Cattle Queen and Border Outlaws. They remained on good terms.

On January 22, 1951, she married actor Drake Smith in a double wedding with Jack Seaman. Smith had been her leading man in Cattle Queen.
