= The Lusty Men =

1952 film by Nicholas Ray

- Original film poster
- Directed by: Nicholas Ray
- Screenplay by: Horace McCoy; David Dortort
- Based on: "King of the Cowboys"; 1946 article in Life by Claude Stanush
- Produced by: Jerry Wald; Norman Krasna
- Starring: Susan Hayward; Robert Mitchum; Arthur Kennedy; Arthur Hunnicutt
- Cinematography: Lee Garmes
- Edited by: Ralph Dawson
- Music by: Roy Webb
- Production companies: Wald/Krasna Productions; Spinel Entertainment
- Distributed by: RKO Radio Pictures
- Release dates: September 28, 1952 (Fort Worth, Texas)
- Running time: 113 minutes
- Country: United States
- Language: English
- Box office: $1.5 million (U.S. rentals)

The Lusty Men is a 1952 contemporary Western film directed by Nicholas Ray, and starring Susan Hayward, Robert Mitchum, Arthur Kennedy and Arthur Hunnicutt. The screenplay was written by David Dortort and Horace McCoy based on the 1946 Life magazine article "King of the Cowboys" by Claude Stanush. The film's cinematographer was Lee Garmes and its score was composed by Roy Webb.

== Plot ==
Professional rodeo rider Jeff McCloud is injured and quits the circuit. He hitchhikes to tiny Bandera, Texas, where he finds the derelict home of his youth owned by a poor but covetous old man. Wes Merritt and his wife Louise are saving money to buy the house. Wes recognizes Jeff as a former champion rodeo rider and helps him obtain a job. Wes, also a rider, wants Jeff to help him improve his skills in order to compete in professional rodeos.

Wes enters a rodeo without telling Louise. He soon becomes a professional with Jeff as his trainer and half partner. Louise opposes the idea, fearing that Wes may be injured and realizing that they must abandon their rented home and their plans for a permanent one. Wes promises that he will quit when he has earned enough money to afford the ranch house.

Wes finds great success as a rider and relishes the fame and adulation that he receives. As Louise becomes acquainted with rodeo life, she becomes increasingly disenchanted. Jeff's friend Booker Davis, a former rodeo champion, is a crippled old man. After veteran rider Buster Burgess is gored and killed by a bull, Louise cannot watch Wes compete. He earns enough for the house but proceeds with his career. He foolishly squanders his winnings while Louise becomes embittered and cloisters herself in their trailer.

When wealthy rodeo fan Babs tries to attract Wes, Louise pours a drink on her head. Jeff, who is attracted to Louise, asks her whether she could love another man, but she proclaims her loyalty to Wes. Wes sends Jeff away, accusing him of freeloading and complaining that Jeff receives half of the prize money while Wes incurs all of the risk.

Jeff returns to the rodeo, although out of shape. He regains Wes's respect by faring well in his first competition, but while bronc riding, Jeff's foot becomes stuck in his stirrup. He is twisted and dragged violently on the ground and then crushed when the horse falls and rolls over him. Louise rushes to his side and seeks to comfort him, but Jeff dies in her arms from a punctured lung. When Wes hears the news, he quits the rodeo and leaves with Louise for Bandera, with Booker and his daughter accompanying them.

== Cast ==
- Susan Hayward as Louise Merritt
- Robert Mitchum as Jeff McCloud
- Arthur Kennedy as Wes Merritt
- Arthur Hunnicutt as Booker Davis
- Frank Faylen as Al Dawson
- Walter Coy as Buster Burgess
- Carol Nugent as Rusty Davis
- Maria Hart as Rosemary Maddox
- Lorna Thayer as Grace Burgess
- Burt Mustin as Jeremiah
- Karen King as Ginny Logan
- Jimmy Dodd as Red Logan
- Eleanor Todd as Babs
- Riley Hill as Hoag

== Production ==
The screenplay was suggested by "King of the Cowboys", an article written by Claude Stanush for the May 13, 1946 issue of Life magazine that profiled rodeo star Bob Crosby. Although the film's credited screenwriters are Horace McCoy and David Dortort, Alfred Hayes and Andrew Solt may have also contributed to the script.

== Release ==
The Lusty Men premiered in Fort Worth, Texas on September 30, 1952, with Mitchum, Hayward, Kennedy and Hunnicutt in attendance. Over the following days, the film opened in other Texas cities such as Houston and San Antonio, with its stars traveling to each location for personal appearances.

== Reception ==
In a contemporary review for The New York Times, critic Bosley Crowther wrote: "This vivid and pungent demonstration of the activities of professional 'saddle tramps'—the cowboys who scratch erratic livings on the circuit of the Western rodeos—gives such a harsh, discouraging insight into this form of commercialized sport that every backyard bronc-buster who sees it should go back to being a railroad engineer. With a literal and candid use of camera that would stand out in the documentary field, director Nicholas Ray has really captured the muscle and thump of rodeos. ... [T]he punch of the film is in its details of rodeo life as it is, and for this R. K. O. and producer Jerry Wald have a dynamic film."

Critic John L. Scott of the Los Angeles Times called the film "a solid, exciting film drama" and wrote: "There are solid laughs and equally tense drama in 'The Lusty Men.' Rodeo thrills are plentiful too. ... Nicholas Ray deserves a hand for his direction."

== See also ==
- List of American films of 1952
