= Over the Border (1950 film) =

1950 film by Wallace Fox

- Theatrical release poster
- Directed by: Wallace Fox
- Screenplay by: J. Benton Cheney
- Produced by: Wallace Fox
- Starring: Johnny Mack Brown; Wendy Waldron; Myron Healey; Pierre Watkin; Frank Jaquet; Marshall Reed
- Cinematography: Harry Neumann
- Edited by: John C. Fuller
- Production company: Monogram Pictures
- Distributed by: Monogram Pictures
- Release date: March 12, 1950
- Running time: 58 minutes
- Country: United States
- Language: English

Over the Border is a 1950 American Western film directed by Wallace Fox, written by J. Benton Cheney and starring Johnny Mack Brown, Wendy Waldron, Myron Healey, Pierre Watkin, Frank Jaquet and Marshall Reed. The film was released on March 12, 1950 by Monogram Pictures.

== Cast ==
- Johnny Mack Brown as Johnny Mack Brown
- Wendy Waldron as Tess Malloy
- Myron Healey as Jeff Grant
- Pierre Watkin as Rand Malloy
- Frank Jaquet as Dr. Jonathan Foster
- Marshall Reed as Bart Calhoun
- House Peters Jr. as Wade Shelton
- Milburn Morante as Jud Mason
- Mike Ragan as Duke Winslow
- Hank Bell as Sheriff
- George DeNormand as Tucker
