= Georgie Nokes =

American actor

Robert “Georgie” Nokes (October 22, 1936 – May 22, 1986) was an American child actor. He was in the Christmas movie It's a Wonderful Life. He starred in the 1948 film Shaggy and was in a series of Monogram comedy films about the Latham family. He was blond.

== Death ==
Nokes died of cardiomyopathy at his home in Riverside, California, on May 22, 1986.

== Filmography ==
- Gaslight (1944)
- It's a Wonderful Life (1946) as Little Harry
- Song of the South (1946) as Jake Favers
- Best Years of Our Lives (1946)
- Curley (1947) as Chuck
- Shaggy (1948) as Robbie Calvin
- Slippy McGee (1948) as Tommy
- State of the Union (1948) as Grant Matthews Jr.
- Henry, the Rainmaker (1949) as Georgie Colton
- The Cowboy and the Indians (1949) as Rona
- Father's Wild Game (1950) as Georgie
- Father Makes Good (1950) as Georgie
- Father Takes the Air (1951) as Georgie
