= Raymond Walburn =

American actor (1887–1969)

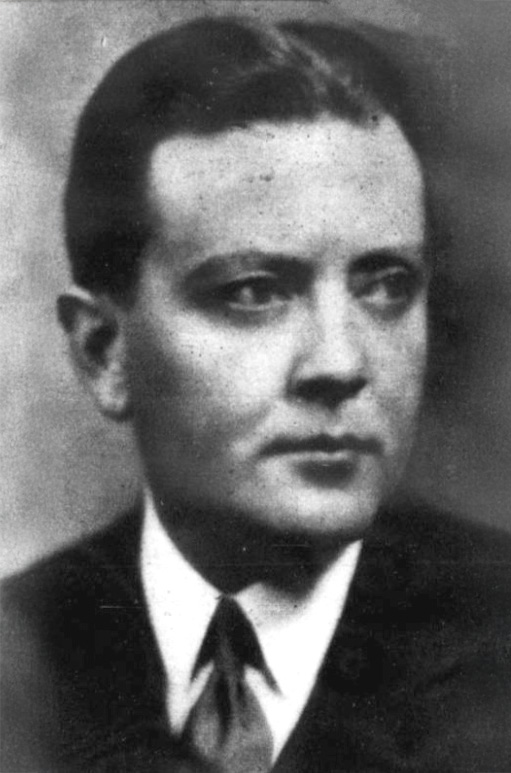
- Walburn in 1929
- Born: September 9, 1887; Plymouth, Indiana, U.S.
- Died: July 26, 1969 (aged 81); New York City, U.S.
- Occupation: Actor
- Years active: 1913–1958
- Spouse(s): Gertrude Steinman (m.?-1953; her death); Jane Davis (m.1955-1969; his death)

Raymond Walburn (September 9, 1887 – July 26, 1969) was an American character actor of stage and screen who appeared in dozens of Hollywood movie comedies and an occasional dramatic role during the 1930s and 1940s.

== Life and career ==
Walburn was born on September 9, 1887, in Plymouth, Indiana, and left there when he was 16 years old, and joined a stock theater company in California, following high school with his mother and began acting on stage, which was also his mother's profession.

There he was placed in an acting school associated with the Liberty Theatre, the principal stock company in Oakland, and made his professional stage debut at the age of 18, playing the Second Witch in MacBeth. (A published source says that his professional debut came in Soldiers of Fortune when he was 19 in a part that his mother secured for him.)

Theatrical troupes with which Walburn acted included the Lakewood Stock Company. Following extensive touring in stock shows, he took his first Broadway bow in the opening of the most popular and successful The Greyhound in 1912. (Another source shows his first Broadway play as Cordelia Blossom (1914).)

Walburn appeared in the serial The Scarlet Runner (1916). After a long period of struggle and a number of theater misfires, his career was interrupted by military service during World War I in the artillery in the United States Army in 1917-1918 where he served in France. This was shortly after his being cast as a replacement in the juvenile lead role in "Come Out of the Kitchen" starring Ruth Chatterton.

Following his discharge from military service he resumed his Broadway and stock show career and grew in stature throughout the 1920s. In 1924 he made his London, England, debut as Aubrey Piper in "The Show-Off," a role which keenly established his pompous image and brash, phony-baloney facade on stage and in later film. Over the decades Walburn's plus-sized comic vanity would become a repetitive scene-stealing tactic.

He performed in stock theater for only four years before being cast on Broadway, where he made his debut in Cordelia Blossom in 1914. Over a half century later, in 1965, Walburn acted in his final Broadway production, A Very Rich Woman. During his long career, he also toured extensively, performing on stages throughout the United States and in other countries.

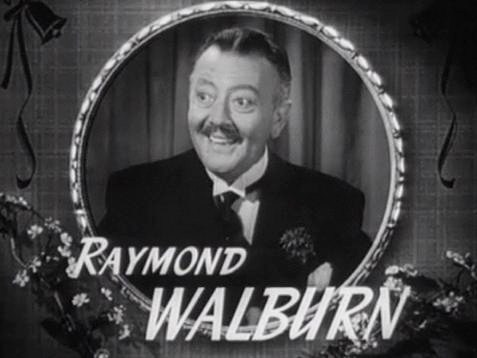
Third Finger, Left Hand trailer (1940)

Walburn did not make an impact in films until 1934 with the release of The Count of Monte Cristo starring Robert Donat. His filmography includes nearly 100 films, with his best known roles as a stereotypical bumbler and as a pompous snob. He could also be villainous, as he was when he played Baron Danglars in the 1934 film version of The Count of Monte Cristo, and was a favorite of such celebrated comedy directors as Preston Sturges and Frank Capra, with whom he made several appearances.

Outside of a couple of nondescript roles in silent films, Walburn did not take a serious stab at films until 1929, when he was cast supporting a Ruth Chatterton vehicle (again), this time playing her unfaithful husband in The Laughing Lady (1929). He did not return to films again, however, until five years later following a stage success in The Pursuit of Happiness (1933). From 1934 on he continued to be seen in film and was a main character staple for Columbia. For Frank Capra his highlights included Colonel Pettigrew, the race track tout, in Broadway Bill (1934); the ostentatious valet of Gary Cooper in Mr. Deeds Goes to Town (1936); and the opportunistic Judge Alexander in the Spencer Tracy / Katharine Hepburn starrer State of the Union (1948). He also performed in Capra's pallid musical remake of Broadway Bill entitled Riding High (1950) with Bing Crosby, in which he recreated his Colonel Pettigrew shyster. As a Preston Sturges favorite, Walburn shined as the sarcastic and pompous Dr. Maxford in Christmas in July (1940); the windbag Mayor Noble in the classic Hail the Conquering Hero (1944); and as the boss who fires Harold Lloyd in The Sin of Harold Diddlebock (1947) [aka Mad Wednesday].

In post-war years, the by-now chunky-framed Walburn was given a great chance to show off by headlining his own "Henry" series of light comedy films. Playing patriarch Henry Latham in its debut Henry, the Rainmaker (1949), he was able to bounce off the droll antics of Walter Catlett's Mayor Colton character. Barbara Brown as his wife and young Gary Gray as son David were around for the entire series. He cavorted in five features ending with Father Takes the Air (1951). Walburn's last film was the rather uneventful western The Spoilers (1955).

In 1962, at the age of 74, he came out of his self-imposed retirement at the urging of Harold Prince to join Zero Mostel and company in the burlesque musical farce A Funny Thing Happened on the Way to the Forum playing a senile Roman citizen. He appeared in the show for 18 months, then went on to appear with Ruth Gordon in A Very Rich Woman in 1965.

== Personal life and death ==
Following the death of his first wife, the former Gertrude Steinman, (affectionately known as Trudy), Walburn more or less retired, but found happiness again when he married a family friend, Jane Davis, in 1955. He died on July 26, 1969, in LeRoy Hospital in New York City at the age of 81 following an extended illness.

== Complete filmography ==
- The Man Hunt (1916 short) as Captain Steadwell
- The Tarantula (1916) as Saunders
- The Scarlet Runner (1916 serial) as John Brown
- Our Other Lives (1916 short)
- The Laughing Lady (1929) as Hector Lee
- The Great Flirtation (1934) as Henry Morgan
- The Defense Rests (1934) as Austin
- The Count of Monte Cristo (1934) as Danglars
- Lady by Choice (1934) as Front O'Malley
- Jealousy (1934) as Phil
- Broadway Bill (1934) as Col. Pettigrew
- Mills of the Gods (1934) as Willard Hastings
- Society Doctor (1935) as Dr. Waverly
- Death Flies East (1935) as Evans
- I'll Love You Always (1935) as Charlie
- It's a Small World (1935) as Julius Clummerhorn
- Welcome Home (1935) as Giltedge
- Redheads on Parade (1935) as Augustus Twill
- She Married Her Boss (1935) as Franklin
- She Couldn't Take It (1935) as Party Guest (uncredited)
- Thanks a Million (1935) as Judge Culliman
- The Lone Wolf Returns (1935) as Jenkins
- The Great Ziegfeld (1936) as Sage
- Mr. Deeds Goes to Town (1936) as Walter, the butler
- Absolute Quiet (1936) as Governor Pruden
- The King Steps Out (1936) as Col. Von Kempen
- The Three Wise Guys (1936) as Doc Brown
- They Met in a Taxi (1936) as Mr. Roger Clifton
- Craig's Wife (1936) as Billy Birkmire
- Mr. Cinderella (1936) as Peter Randolph
- Born to Dance (1936) as Captain Dingby
- Breezing Home (1937) as Clint Evans
- Let's Get Married (1937) as B.B. Harrington
- Thin Ice (1937) as Uncle Dornik
- It Can't Last Forever (1937) as Dr. Fothergill
- High, Wide, and Handsome (1937) as Doc Watterson
- Broadway Melody of 1938 (1937) as Herman Whipple
- Murder in Greenwich Village (1937) as The Senator
- Start Cheering (1938) as Dean Worthington
- Battle of Broadway (1938) as Homer C. Bundy
- Professor Beware (1938) as Judge James G. Parkhouse Marshall
- Gateway (1938) as Mr. Benjamin McNutt
- Sweethearts (1938) as Orlando
- Let Freedom Ring (1939) as Underwood
- It Could Happen to You (1939) as J. Hadden Quigley
- The Under-Pup (1939) as Mr. Layton
- Eternally Yours (1939) as Mr. Harley Bingham
- Heaven with a Barbed Wire Fence (1939) as Professor B. Townsend Thayer
- Dark Command (1940) as Judge Buckner
- Millionaires in Prison (1940) as Bruce Vander
- Flowing Gold (1940) as Ellery Q. 'Wildcat' Chalmers
- Third Finger, Left Hand (1940) as Mr. Sherwood
- Christmas in July (1940) as Dr. Maxford
- The San Francisco Docks (1940) as Adm. Andy Tracy
- Bachelor Daddy (1941) as George Smith
- Puddin' Head (1941) as Harold Montgomery Sr.
- Kiss the Boys Goodbye (1941) as Top Rumson
- Confirm or Deny (1941) as H. Cyrus Stuyvesant
- Rise and Shine (1941) as Colonel Bacon
- Louisiana Purchase (1941) as Col. Davis Sr. aka Polar Bear
- The Man in the Trunk (1942) as Jim Cheevers
- Lady Bodyguard (1943) as Avery Jamieson
- Dixie Dugan (1943) as J.J. Lawson
- The Desperadoes (1943) as Judge Cameron
- Dixie (1943) as Mr. Cook
- Let's Face It (1943) as Julian Watson
- And the Angels Sing (1944) as Pop Angel
- Hail the Conquering Hero (1944) as Mayor Everett J. Noble
- Arsenic and Old Lace (1944) as Drummer at baseball game (uncredited)
- Music in Manhattan (1944) as Professor Carl Roberti
- Heavenly Days (1944) as Mr. Popham
- Honeymoon Abroad (1945) as Rollie Mack
- I'll Tell the World (1945) as H.I. Bailey
- The Cheaters (1945) as Willie Crawford
- Breakfast in Hollywood (1946) as Richard Cartwright
- Lover Come Back (1946) as J.P. 'Joe' Winthrop
- Rendezvous with Annie (1946) as Everett Thorndyke
- Plainsman and the Lady (1946) as Judge Winters
- Affairs of Geraldine (1946) as Amos Hartwell
- The Sin of Harold Diddlebock (1947) as E.J. Waggleberry
- State of the Union (1948) as Judge Alexander
- Henry, the Rainmaker (1949) as Henry Latham
- Leave It to Henry (1949) as Henry Latham
- Red, Hot and Blue (1949) as Alex Ryan Creek
- Key to the City (1950) as Mayor Billy Butler
- Riding High (1950) as Prof. Pettigrew
- Father Makes Good (1950) as Henry Latham
- Father's Wild Game (1950) as Henry Latham
- Short Grass (1950) as Doctor McKenna
- Father Takes the Air (1951) as Henry Latham
- Excuse My Dust (1951) as Mayor Fred Haskell
- Golden Girl (1951) as Cornelius
- She Couldn't Say No (1952) as Judge Hobart
- The Spoilers (1955) as Mr. Skinner
