= Leave It to Henry =

1949 film

- Directed by: Jean Yarbrough
- Screenplay by: D.D. Beauchamp
- Based on: The Cruise of the Prairie Queen by D.D. Beauchamp
- Produced by: Peter Scully
- Starring: Raymond Walburn; Walter Catlett; Gary Gray; Mary Stuart; Barbara Brown; Houseley Stevenson
- Cinematography: William A. Sickner
- Edited by: Peter Scully
- Production company: Mayfair Productions Inc.
- Distributed by: Monogram Pictures
- Release date: June 12, 1949
- Running time: 57 minutes
- Country: United States
- Language: English

Leave It to Henry is a 1949 American comedy film directed by Jean Yarbrough and written by D.D. Beauchamp. The film stars Raymond Walburn, Walter Catlett, Gary Gray, Mary Stuart, Barbara Brown and Houseley Stevenson. The film was released on June 12, 1949, by Monogram Pictures.

== Cast ==
- Raymond Walburn as Henry Latham
- Walter Catlett as Mayor George Colton
- Gary Gray as David Latham
- Mary Stuart as Barbara Latham
- Barbara Brown as Edna Latham
- Houseley Stevenson as Mr. McCluskey
- Ida Moore as Aunt Martha
- Olin Howland as Milo Williams
- Pat Phelan as Jim McCluskey
- George McDonald as Georgie Colton
- Maynard Holmes as Truck Driver
- Burk Symon as Judge
- William Vedder as Jeweler
- Harry Harvey Sr. as Attorney
