= Jody Gilbert =

American actress (1916–1979)

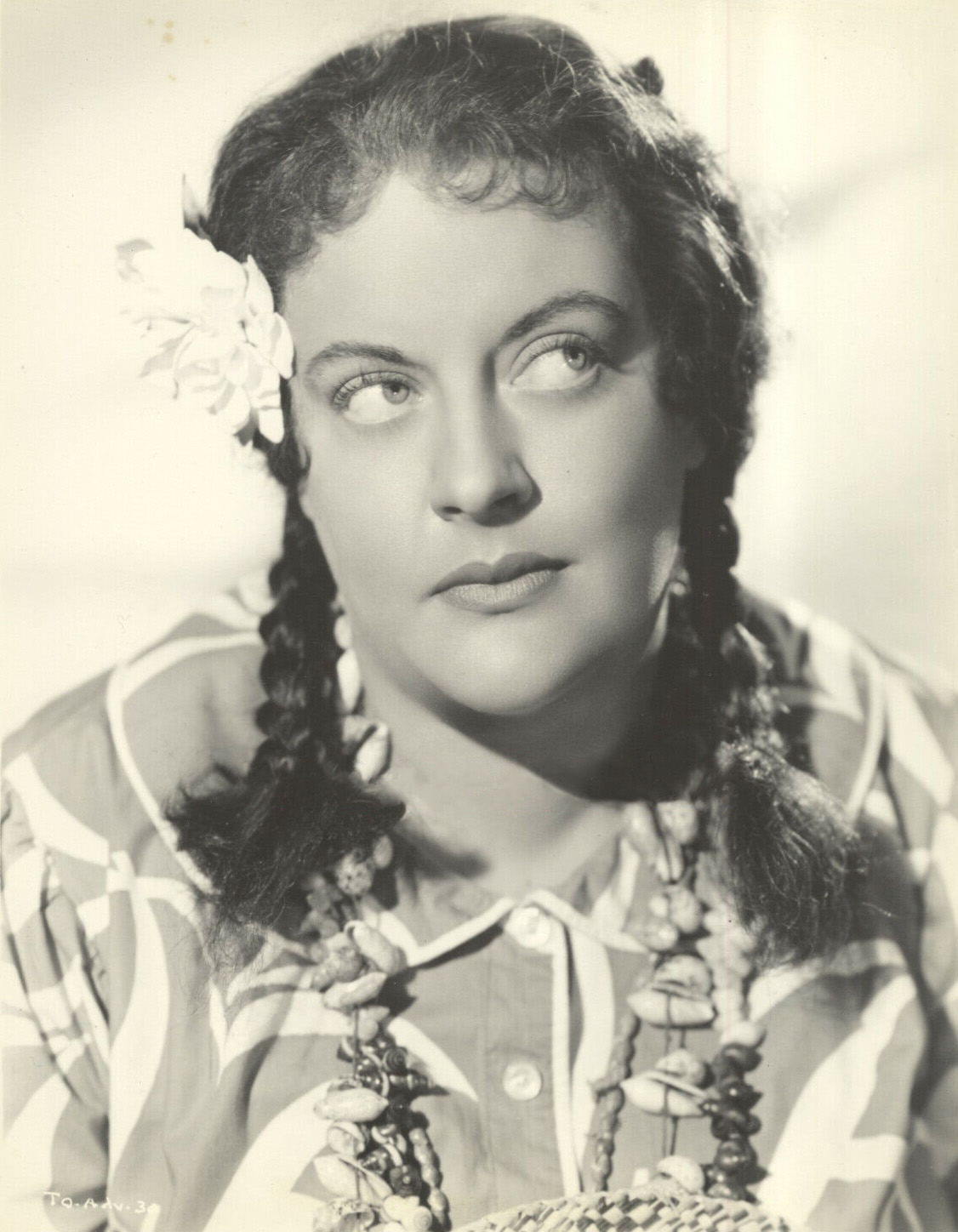
- Jody Gilbert in The Tuttles of Tahiti (1942)
- Born: Joe Ray Swartzburg; March 18, 1916; Fort Worth, Texas, U.S.
- Died: February 3, 1979 (aged 62); Los Angeles, California, U.S.
- Resting place: Hollywood Forever Cemetery
- Occupation: Actress
- Years active: 1937–1953, 1965–1978

Jody Gilbert (née Joe Ray Swartzburg) (March 18, 1916 – February 3, 1979) was an American character actress of radio, television, and film. She was best known for comedic roles. Her screen acting career was interrupted for over a decade by the Hollywood blacklist.

== Biography ==
Gilbert was born in Fort Worth, Texas. She was the daughter of Reba Gilbert and Chas. Swartzburg. Gilbert studied voice and acting at Columbia University, and was a graduate of Pasadena Playhouse.

She worked as a stage actress in the mid-1930s, and began appearing in films in 1937. After numerous uncredited parts—for example, in Ninotchka (1939) she has a few seconds of screen time as Greta Garbo's roommate in Moscow—Gilbert delivered a brief but memorable performance in Never Give a Sucker an Even Break (1941). She played a sarcastic diner waitress who engages in a verbal duel with her customer W.C. Fields.

Over the next decade, she was cast dozens of times (although still mostly uncredited) in movies and TV, often in humorous supporting roles as "sizeable" but confident women. Her most celebrated radio character was playing Rosa in Life with Luigi.

She was Jewish and attended Temple Israel of Hollywood.

Gilbert was politically active within progressive entertainment organizations. She served as an Executive Board member of the Actors Laboratory Theatre and participated in the Hollywood Democratic Committee.

Gilbert's acting career was interrupted by the Hollywood blacklist. In November 1952, a writer named Harvey Narcisenfield testified to the House Un-American Activities Committee (HUAC) that Gilbert was a Communist. When she was summoned before the Committee on March 26, 1953, she used the Fifth Amendment's shield against self-incrimination. But first she made light of the proceedings by invoking the Nineteenth Amendment, and joking that it gave women "equal rights to decline" to answer questions. When asked her profession by HUAC counsel Frank Tavenner, she replied, "Well, now, right at the moment my profession, I would say, is a witness." In addition to the Fifth Amendment, she also cited the Fifth Commandment ("Honor thy father and thy mother") when refusing to answer about her Communist Party membership.

After her HUAC testimony, Gilbert was barred from TV work until 1965. Her next film role was not until 1969 in Butch Cassidy and the Sundance Kid. Her final screen appearances included small parts in episodes of the TV shows Sanford and Son, Police Woman, Starsky and Hutch, and Switch.

On February 3, 1979, Jody Gilbert died at her Sherman Oaks home from complications arising from an automobile accident that she had been involved in the previous autumn. She was 62 and she never married nor had any children, having been survived by her mother and her two siblings.

== Filmography ==
Year	Title	Role	Notes
1937	Confession	Actress	uncredited
1939	Chasing Danger	Teena	
1939	New Frontier	Rusty's Dance Partner	uncredited
1939	No Place to Go	Mrs. Hazelhurst	uncredited
1939	Ninotchka	Streetcar Conductress - Moscow Roommate	uncredited
1939	Everything Happens at Night	Hilda	
1940	Little Old New York	Hilda	
1940	Seventeen	Ethel Boke	uncredited
1940	Star Dust	Swedish Maid	
1940	Ski Patrol	Fanni Nerkuu	
1940	Grand Ole Opry	Women's Club President	uncredited
1940	Brigham Young	Stout Woman Who Can't Swim	uncredited
1940	Flowing Gold	Tillie / Mrs. Harris	
1940	Hit Parade of 1941		uncredited
1941	Hudson's Bay	Germaine	
1941	Maisie Was a Lady	Curly the Bearded Lady	uncredited
1941	Pot o' Gold	Helga Svenson	uncredited
1941	Sergeant York	Fat Woman	uncredited
1941	Wild Geese Calling	Swede	uncredited
1941	Never Give a Sucker an Even Break	The Waitress	
1941	Shadow of the Thin Man	Lana - Spider Webb's Girl	uncredited
1941	Hellzapoppin'	Louie's Girlfriend	uncredited
1941	Remember the Day	Mrs. Martha Avery	
1942	Ride 'Em Cowboy	Moonbeam	uncredited
1942	The Tuttles of Tahiti	Effie	
1942	The Affairs of Martha	Hadwig	uncredited
1942	Iceland	Fat Girl	uncredited
1942	Wrecking Crew	Hefty Girl	uncredited
1942	The Black Swan	Flossy Woman with Tommy	uncredited
1942	Journey for Margaret	Madame Bornholm	uncredited
1942	Reunion in France	Brunhilde - Stout Customer	uncredited
1943	The Hard Way	Anderson - Masseuse	uncredited
1943	Hers to Hold	Babe	uncredited
1943	Wings Over the Pacific	Native Woman with Black Eye	
1943	Hi Diddle Diddle	Agitated Wife	uncredited
1943	Hi'ya, Sailor	Plump Hostess	uncredited
1943	The Unknown Guest	Mrs. Green	uncredited
1943	Princess O'Rourke	Woman Truck Driver	uncredited
1944	The Story of Dr. Wassell	Head Nurse	uncredited
1944	Ladies of Washington	Nurse's Aide	uncredited
1944	Marriage Is a Private Affair	Girl Taxi Driver	uncredited
1944	Lost in a Harem	Native Laundress	uncredited
1944	Music for Millions	Burly Woman Cab Driver	uncredited
1944	Together Again	Fat Woman Fleeing Nightclub Raid	uncredited
1944	Can't Help Singing	Bath House Attendant	uncredited
1945	Roughly Speaking	Woman in Store	uncredited
1945	Christmas in Connecticut	Mrs. Gerseg	uncredited
1945	That Night with You	Masseuse	uncredited
1945	Strange Confession	Mrs. Todd	uncredited
1945	Hold That Blonde	Matron	uncredited
1945	Life with Blondie	Buxom Woman	uncredited
1945	Texas Panhandle	Millie the Blacksmith	uncredited
1946	Partners in Time	The Bad Cook	uncredited
1946	Deadline for Murder	Tiny	
1946	Two Guys from Milwaukee	Big Woman	uncredited
1946	Singing on the Trail	Casey	uncredited
1946	Decoy	Mrs. Noonan	uncredited
1946	Cross My Heart	Miss Stewart	uncredited
1946	The Show-Off	Woman	scenes deleted
1947	Blondie's Holiday	Cynthia Thompson (Class of '32)	
1947	Fun on a Weekend	Customer in Clothing Shop	uncredited
1947	Second Chance	Policewoman	uncredited
1947	Roses Are Red	Jill's Landlady	uncredited
1947	Heading for Heaven	Mable Foster	uncredited
1948	Albuquerque	Pearl Eager	
1948	Are You with It?	Mrs. Minerva Henkle	
1948	Casbah	American Woman	uncredited
1948	Shaggy	Tessie	
1948	Texas, Brooklyn and Heaven	Lady	uncredited
1948	Million Dollar Weekend	Big Woman at Airline Counter	uncredited
1948	My Dear Secretary	Hilda Sneebacher	uncredited
1948	Bungalow 13	Mrs. Martha Barton	
1948	The Paleface	Woman in Bathhouse	uncredited
1949	Knock on Any Door	Gussie	uncredited
1949	The Lost Tribe	Zulta, the Barmaid	uncredited
1949	The Lovable Cheat	Madame Violette	
1949	Hellfire	Full Moon	
1949	One Last Fling	Amy Dearing	
1949	Brimstone	Fat Lady on Stage	uncredited
1949	The Doctor and the Girl	Mrs. Vlacsek	uncredited
1950	The Blonde Bandit	Bertha Fannon	
1950	Blonde Dynamite	Sarah Dumbrowski	
1950	House by the River	Flora Bantam	
1950	The Yellow Cab Man	Cecil's Mother	uncredited
1950	My Friend Irma Goes West	Fat Woman	uncredited
1951	Gene Autry and The Mounties	Squaw	uncredited
1951	Slaughter Trail	Fat Woman at Dance	uncredited
1952	Something to Live For	Woman in Telephone Booth	uncredited
1952	Actor's and Sin	Mrs. Egelhofer	(segment "Woman of Sin")
1952	Jumping Jacks	Mr. White's Secretary	uncredited
1953	Houdini	Fat Girl	uncredited
1967	Dragnet: "The Fur Job"	Mrs. Hilliard	
1969	Butch Cassidy and the Sundance Kid	Large Woman	
1971	Willard	Charlotte Stassen	
1976	Lifeguard	Woman	
