= Mary Field =

American actress (1909–1996)

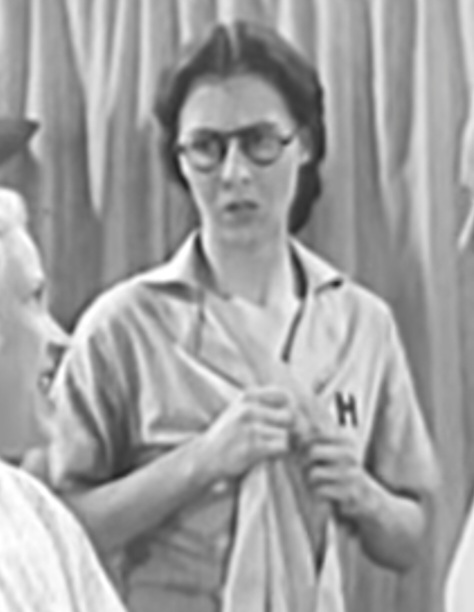
- Field in Slander House (1938)
- Born: Olivia Rockefeller; June 10, 1909; New York City, U.S.
- Died: June 12, 1996 (aged 87); Fairfax, Virginia, U.S.
- Occupation: Actress
- Years active: 1937–1963
- Spouse(s): Allan Douglas (m. 194?; div. 194?); James Madison Walters II (m. 19??; died 1982)
- Children: 2
- Website: www.maryfield.us

Mary Field (abandoned as a waif as "Olivia Rockefeller;" June 10, 1909 – June 12, 1996) was an American film actress who primarily appeared in supporting roles.

== Early life ==
Fields was born in New York City, where she was abandoned as an infant. Nothing is known of her biological parents, as she was left outside the doors of a church with a note pinned to her saying only that her name was Olivia Rockefeller. She was later adopted, and attended the Brentwood Hall School in Westchester County, New York.

== Hollywood and television ==
Fields signed with Warner Bros. Studios in 1937, and made her film debut in The Prince and the Pauper released that year. Over a two and a half decade career she appeared, primarily uncredited, in small roles in approximately 103 films, primarily "B" pictures, with a sprinkling of "A" mixed in. Among these films were Jezebel (1938), Cowboy from Brooklyn (1938), The Amazing Dr. Clitterhouse (1938), Eternally Yours (1939), When Tomorrow Comes (1939), Broadway Melody of 1940, Ball of Fire (1941), How Green Was My Valley (1941), Shadows on the Stairs (1941), Mrs. Miniver (1942), Ministry of Fear (1944), Song of the South (1946), Out of the Past (1947), Miracle on 34th Street (1947), and Life With Father (1947).

Her TV credits include parts in Gunsmoke (in 1960 as an abused wife in S5E19's “Till Death Do Us Part” & in 1962 as Clara Ott in S7E24's “Coventry”), Wagon Train, Mr. Adams and Eve, and The Loretta Young Show. In 1963, her last acting role was as a Roman Catholic nun in the television series, Going My Way, starring Gene Kelly and modeled after the 1944 Bing Crosby film of the same name. She appeared in several episodes of the television comedy, Topper, as Henrietta Topper's friend Thelma Gibney.

== Personal life ==
In the 1940s, Field was married to Allan Douglas, a member of the Army Medical Corps. Following her 1963 retirement she was still married to her husband James Madison Walters and lived in Laguna Niguel, California. She also devoted her time to family and was active in the Hollywood Church of Religious Science.

== Death ==
On June 12, 1996, two days after her 87th birthday, Mary Field died at her home in Fairfax, Virginia, of complications from a stroke. She lived there with her daughter, Susana Kerstein, and son-in-law, Bob Kerstein. She had two grandchildren, Sky Kerstein and Kendall Kerstein. She was cremated and her ashes returned to her family.

== Filmography ==
=== In film only ===
- Call It a Day (1937) as Elsie Lester, Roger's Secretary (uncredited)
- The Prince and the Pauper (1937) as Mrs. Canty
- Hoosier Schoolboy (1937) as School Board Secretary
- White Banners (1938) as Hester
- Jezebel (1938) as Woman at the Olympus Ball (uncredited)
- Cowboy from Brooklyn (1938) as Myrtle Semple (Elly's secretary)
- The Amazing Dr. Clitterhouse (1938) as Millie - Mrs. Updyke's Maid (uncredited)
- Youth Takes a Fling (1938) as Maid (uncredited)
- Slander House (1938) as Bessie, an attendant
- There Goes My Heart (1938) as Mrs. Crud - Pennypepper's Patient (voice, uncredited)
- The Storm (1938) as Woman on Bus (uncredited)
- His Exciting Night (1938) as Carslake's Secretary (uncredited)
- Federal Man-Hunt (1938) as Mock Funeral Participant (uncredited)
- Made for Each Other (1939) as Johns Hopkins technician (uncredited)
- Society Smugglers (1939) as Susan - Sully's Secretary
- Sergeant Madden (1939) as Mrs. Daly (uncredited)
- The Family Next Door (1939) as Secretary (uncredited)
- The Story of Alexander Graham Bell (1939) as Piano Player (uncredited)
- The Sun Never Sets (1939) as Maid (uncredited)
- Unexpected Father (1939) as Nurse (uncredited)
- Good Girls Go to Paris (1939) as Ada - Brand's Maid (uncredited)
- Stunt Pilot (1939) as Ethel
- The Fighting Gringo (1939) as Sandra Courtney
- When Tomorrow Comes (1939) as Waitress (uncredited)
- Dancing Co-Ed (1939) as Miss May
- Eternally Yours (1939) as Peabody's Housekeeper (uncredited)
- Little Accident (1939) as Miss Wilson (uncredited)
- Legion of the Lawless (1940) as Mrs. Barton
- The Invisible Man Returns (1940) as Passerby at Willie's House (uncredited)
- Convicted Woman (1940) as Gracie Dunn
- I Take This Woman (1940) as Crazy Woman (scenes deleted)
- Broadway Melody of 1940 (1940) as 2nd Bride (uncredited)
- Ma! He's Making Eyes at Me (1940) as Girl Customer (uncredited)
- My Son, My Son (1940) as First Maid
- Three Faces West (1940) as Mrs. Stebbins (uncredited)
- Girls of the Road (1940) as Mae
- The Howards of Virginia (1940) as Susan Howard
- Yesterday's Heroes (1940) as Librarian (uncredited)
- The Ape (1940) as Mrs. Mason (uncredited)
- The Trail Blazers (1940) as Alice Chapman
- The Bank Dick (1940) as Woman (uncredited)
- Charter Pilot (1940) as Secretary (uncredited)
- Cheers for Miss Bishop (1941) as Mary, the Dressmaker (uncredited)
- Golden Hoofs (1941) as Nellie (uncredited)
- The Great Mr. Nobody (1941) as Miss Frame
- Andy Hardy's Private Secretary (1941) as Lingerie Saleswoman (uncredited)
- Shadows on the Stairs (1941) as Miss Snell
- A Girl, a Guy, and a Gob (1941) as Woman on Street (uncredited)
- Affectionately Yours (1941) as Mrs. Collins (uncredited)
- Father Steps Out (1941) as Mrs. Benton, Farm Woman
- Dr. Jekyll and Mr. Hyde (1941) as Wife (uncredited)
- Wild Geese Calling (1941) as Jennie Delaney
- One Foot in Heaven (1941) as Tallulah 'Lulu' Digby (uncredited)
- Sea Raiders (1941, Serial) as Aggie Nelson
- How Green Was My Valley (1941) as Eve (uncredited)
- Ball of Fire (1941) as Miss Totten
- Dr. Kildare's Victory (1942) as Ms. Nixon (uncredited)
- Mexican Spitfire at Sea (1942) as Agnes, the Epping Maid (uncredited)
- Mokey (1942) as Mrs. Graham
- The Man Who Wouldn't Die (1942) as Maid (uncredited)
- This Above All (1942) as Hotel Maid (uncredited)
- Miss Annie Rooney (1942) as Mrs. Metz
- Mrs. Miniver (1942) as Miss Spriggins (uncredited)
- The Gay Sisters (1942) as Farmer's Granddaughter / Organist (uncredited)
- Wake Island (1942) as Miss Pringle, Woman with Cynthia (uncredited)
- Just Off Broadway (1942) as Maid (uncredited)
- The Major and the Minor (1942) as Wilbur & Margie's Mother in Railroad Station (uncredited)
- Get Hep to Love (1942) as Woman Judge (uncredited)
- You Can't Escape Forever (1942) as Kirsty Lundstrom (uncredited)
- Now, Voyager (1942) as Passenger (uncredited)
- I Married a Witch (1942) as Nancy Wooley
- You Were Never Lovelier (1942) as Louise - the Acuña Maid (uncredited)
- Henry Aldrich Plays Cupid (1942) as Anxious (uncredited)
- The Great Gildersleeve (1942) as Amelia Hooker
- The Gorilla Man (1943) as Nurse Kruger
- The Crystal Ball (1943) as Foster (uncredited)
- Hello, Frisco, Hello (1943) as Ellie, Cockney Maid
- Three Hearts for Julia (1943) as The Symphony Guild Secretary (uncredited)
- Salute to the Marines (1943) as Mrs. Riggs (uncredited)
- A Lady Takes a Chance (1943) as Florrie Bendix
- Holy Matrimony (1943) as Oxford's Secretary (uncredited)
- Princess O'Rourke (1943) as Clara Stilwell (uncredited)
- Four Jills in a Jeep (1944) as Maid (scenes cut)
- It Happened Tomorrow (1944) as Lizzie, Waitress at Restaurant (uncredited)
- Henry Aldrich Plays Cupid (1944) as Anxious (uncredited)
- Up in Mabel's Room (1944) as Priscilla's Sister (uncredited)
- Once Upon a Time (1944) as Taxi Girl (uncredited)
- Mr. Skeffington (1944) as Mrs. Penelope Hyslup (uncredited)
- Ladies of Washington (1944) as Nurse's Aide (uncredited)
- Johnny Doesn't Live Here Anymore (1944) as Subscription Lady (uncredited)
- Three Little Sisters (1944) as Carrie Higginbotham (uncredited)
- The Port of 40 Thieves (1944) as Della
- Frenchman's Creek (1944) as Prue (uncredited)
- And Now Tomorrow (1944) as Nurse (uncredited)
- Ministry of Fear (1944) as Martha Penteel (uncredited)
- The Affairs of Susan (1945) as Nancy
- The Unseen (1945) as Miss Budge (uncredited)
- Wonder Man (1945) as Miss Hutchison - the Police Stenographer (uncredited)
- Love Letters (1945) as Nurse in Italy (uncredited)
- Because of Him (1946) as Maid (uncredited)
- Little Giant (1946) as Secretary (uncredited)
- Breakfast in Hollywood (1946) as Ms. Field (uncredited)
- The Gentleman Misbehaves (1946) as Maid (uncredited)
- Sentimental Journey (1946) as Chaperon (uncredited)
- Talk About a Lady (1946) as Telephone Operator (uncredited)
- House of Horrors (1946) as Nora, Switchboard Operator (uncredited)
- Murder in the Music Hall (1946) as Waitress
- The Dark Corner (1946) as Movie Theatre Cashier (uncredited)
- One More Tomorrow (1946) as Maude Miller (uncredited)
- The Walls Came Tumbling Down (1946) as Bradford's Secretary (uncredited)
- Don't Gamble with Strangers (1946) as Mrs. Arnold
- Rendezvous with Annie (1946) as Deborah
- Mr. Ace (1946) as Lady with Question on Radio Forum (uncredited)
- Black Angel (1946) as Mavis' Maid (uncredited)
- Lady Luck (1946) as Miss Field - Thin Woman in Bookstore (uncredited)
- Song of the South (1946) as Mrs. Favers
- The Shocking Miss Pilgrim (1947) as Teacher (uncredited)
- The Pilgrim Lady (1947) as Telephone Operator (uncredited) (aka Miss Pilgrim)
- The Unfaithful (1947) as Miss Bryar - Hannaford's Receptionist (uncredited)
- The Other Love (1947) as Nurse (uncredited)
- The Corpse Came C.O.D. (1947) as Felice (uncredited)
- Miracle on 34th Street (1947) as Dutch Girl's Adopted Mother (uncredited)
- Welcome Stranger (1947) as Secretary
- High Conquest (1947) as Miss Woodley
- The Trouble with Women (1947) as Della (uncredited)
- Life with Father (1947) as Nora
- Dark Passage (1947) as Aunt Mary (uncredited)
- Driftwood (1947) as Mrs. White (uncredited)
- Unconquered (1947) as Maggie
- Louisiana (1947) as Mrs. Davis
- Her Husband's Affairs (1947) as Hortense, Mrs. Winterbottom's Maid (uncredited)
- Where There's Life (1947) as Hotel Maid (uncredited)
- Out of the Past (1947) as Marny - Diner Owner (uncredited)
- If You Knew Susie (1948) as Telephone Operator (uncredited)
- Sitting Pretty (1948) as Della - Book Shoppe Proprietress (uncredited)
- The Fuller Brush Man (1948) as Beaver Patrol Leader (uncredited)
- Up in Central Park (1948) as Miss Murch
- Romance on the High Seas (1948) as Marie - Elvira's Maid (uncredited)
- The Babe Ruth Story (1948) as Nurse (uncredited)
- Mr. Peabody and the Mermaid (1948) as Wee Shop Clerk
- Sorry, Wrong Number (1948) as Telephone Operator (uncredited)
- A Song is Born (1948) as Miss Totten
- Joan of Arc (1948) as Boy's Mother (uncredited)
- One Sunday Afternoon (1948) as Barnstead's Secretary (uncredited)
- Chicken Every Sunday (1949) as Miss Gilly (uncredited)
- Henry, the Rainmaker (1949) as Mrs. Sweeney
- A Connecticut Yankee in King Arthur's Court (1949) as Peasant Woman
- Look for the Silver Lining (1949) as Rocky (uncredited)
- You're My Everything (1949) as Record Store Clerk (uncredited)
- Special Agent (1949) as Miss Tannehill - Librarian (uncredited)
- Mighty Joe Young (1949) as O'Hara's Secretary (uncredited)
- Mr. Soft Touch (1949) as Tenant (uncredited)
- Top o' the Morning (1949) as Maid
- Dear Wife (1949) as Mrs. Bixby
- Paid in Full (1950) as Dr. Winston's Patient (uncredited)
- Cheaper by the Dozen (1950) as Music Teacher (uncredited)
- Father Makes Good (1950) as Mrs. Sweeney (uncredited)
- Edge of Doom (1950) as Mary Jane Glennon
- Let's Dance (1950) as Nurse (uncredited)
- Dear Brat (1951) as File Clerk (uncredited)
- Passage West (1951) as Miss Swingate
- The Barefoot Mailman (1951) as Mrs. Thomas (uncredited)
- The Greatest Show on Earth (1952) as Spectator (uncredited)
- Monkey Business (1952, uncredited)
- Something to Live For (1952, uncredited)
- Anything Can Happen (1952) as Aunt Florence (uncredited)
- The Lady Wants Mink (1953) as Janie
- Champ for a Day (1953) as Ann - Healy's Receptionist (uncredited)
- Four Guns to the Border (1954) as Mrs. Pritchard
- The Private War of Major Benson (1955) as Sister Mary Theresa
- To Hell and Back (1955) as Mrs. Murphy
- Lucy Gallant (1955) as Irma Wilson
- Assignment: Mexico (1956, TV Movie) as Jane
- The Price of Fear (1956) as Ruth McNab
- The Toy Tiger (1956) as Miss Elsie
- The Three Faces of Eve (1957) as Effie Blanford (uncredited)
- The Missouri Traveler (1958) as Nelda Hamilton
- Ride a Crooked Trail (1958) as Mrs. Curtis
- Seven Ways from Sundown (1960) as Mrs. Karrington
