= M'liss McClure =

American actress

- Born: Helen Francell Coutts; 1925; Alameda, California, US
- Died: 2013 (aged 87–88); Palm Desert, California, US
- Education: University of the Pacific; University of California
- Occupation: Actress
- Years active: 1948–1954
- Notable credit(s): Father's Wild Game; Father Takes the Air; White Goddess
- Television: Ramar of the Jungle
- Spouse(s): Marvin A. Finch (m. 1949); Harry S. Rothschild (m. 1952–1954); Vincent Fotre (m. 1966–1970)

Helen Francell Coutts (1925–2013), known professionally as M'liss McClure, was an American actress who starred in films and television in the 1940s and 1950s. Originally starring under the name Helen Francell, she chose her official stage name as M'liss McClure in 1948 before featuring in primary roles in films such as the Father's Wild Game series and White Goddess. She appeared as a guest for a number of promotional events and contests for foodstuffs and the US military.

== Early life and education ==
Helen Coutts was born to Francella and Warren L. Coutts in Alameda, California. She had an interest in dance from a young age, practicing ballet and tap dancing. She attended Alameda High School before studying dramatics at the University of the Pacific and art at the University of California. In 1951, she told an interviewer that if her acting career ended, she intended to be a portrait painter.

== Career ==
Starring in theatre performances at the Pasadena Playhouse for two years, she was noticed in 1948 by film producers and cast in productions including April Showers, For the Love of Mary, and Stage Struck. She also acted as Deanna Durbin's double during the production of Washington Girl. Originally choosing a shortened stage name of Helen Francell, she later settled on M'liss McClure after suggestions from her friends. In order to get more major roles in films starting in November 1948, McClure hired a publicity agency that promoted the beauty of her eyes and her "almost telescopic vision".

During this same time period, she began acting on stage while applying for film roles. While not obtaining a stage role in White Fury, she was accepted for a place in Telluride's Silver Belle in December of that year.

McClure also made appearances at various company and organization shows as the guest of honor for publicity purposes, such as being crowned "Miss Air Fair" at the California Air Freight Fair in August 1950 and "Miss Heavenly Peach" at the "Hunt For Heavenly Peach" contest for Hunt Foods. She was also featured in promotions for ranching performances and acted as a party companion for the winner of the "All American Infantryman" competition.

== Filmography ==
- April Showers (1948)
- Stage Struck (1948)
- For the Love of Mary (1948)
- Operation Haylift (1950) as Mary
- Father's Wild Game (1950) as Barbara Latham
- Insurance Investigator (1951) as Cigarette girl
- Father Takes the Air (1951) as Barbara Latham
- White Goddess (1953) as Trudy Van Dyne

=== TV series ===
- The Adventures of Wild Bill Hickok (1 episode - 1951) as Alice Cameron
- Ramar of the Jungle (7 episodes - 1953-1954) as Trudy Van Dyne

== Personal life and death ==
McClure married Marvin A. Finch, a jewelry manufacturer, on March 3, 1949; they had met on a blind date the previous year. They later divorced. She remarried to oilman Harry S. Rothschild on September 23, 1952, but accused him of mental cruelty and had a default divorce from him approved on February 18, 1954. In 1966 she remarried to Vincent Fotre. She divorced him in 1970, and subsequently lived in Palm Desert, California, where she died in 2013, aged 88.
