= Stage Struck (1948 film) =

1948 film by William Nigh

- Directed by: William Nigh
- Written by: Agnes Christine Johnston; George Wallace Sayre
- Produced by: Jeffrey Bernerd
- Starring: Kane Richmond; Audrey Long; Conrad Nagel
- Cinematography: Harry Neumann
- Edited by: William Austin
- Music by: Edward J. Kay
- Production company: Monogram Pictures
- Distributed by: Monogram Pictures
- Release date: June 13, 1948
- Running time: 71 minutes
- Country: United States
- Language: English

Stage Struck is a 1948 American crime film directed by William Nigh and starring Kane Richmond, Audrey Long and Conrad Nagel.

== Partial cast ==
- Kane Richmond as Nick Mantee
- Audrey Long as Nancy Howard
- Conrad Nagel as Police Lt. Williams
- Ralph Byrd as Police Sgt. Tom Ramey
- John Gallaudet as Benny Nordick
- Anthony Warde as Mr. Barda
- Pamela Blake as Janet Winters
- Charles Trowbridge as Police Capt. Webb
- Nana Bryant as Mrs. Howard
- Selmer Jackson as Mr. Howard
- Evelyn Brent as Miss Lloyd
- Wanda McKay as Helen Howard
- Lyn Thomas as Ruth Ames
- Wilbur Mack as Prof. Corella
- M'liss McClure

== Bibliography ==
- Stephens, Michael L. Art Directors in Cinema: A Worldwide Biographical Dictionary. McFarland, 1998.
