= Father Takes the Air =

1951 film directed by Frank McDonald

- Theatrical release poster
- Directed by: Frank McDonald
- Screenplay by: D.D. Beauchamp
- Produced by: Peter Scully
- Starring: Raymond Walburn; Walter Catlett; Gary Gray; Florence Bates; Barbara Brown; M'liss McClure; James Brown
- Cinematography: William A. Sickner
- Edited by: Carlton Sand
- Production company: Mayfair Productions Inc.
- Distributed by: Monogram Pictures
- Release date: June 17, 1951
- Running time: 61 minutes
- Country: United States
- Language: English

Father Takes the Air is a 1951 American comedy film directed by Frank McDonald, written by D.D. Beauchamp and starring Raymond Walburn, Walter Catlett, Gary Gray, Florence Bates, Barbara Brown, M'liss McClure and James Brown. The film was released on June 17, 1951 by Monogram Pictures.

== Plot ==
Barbara Latham takes temporary charge of a small flying-school. Her father Henry is inspired to restart his flying career, not having flown since the end of World War I. He joins with mayor and fellow veteran George Colton as they accept a contract to fly a wanted criminal to Las Vegas, but they forget to refuel the airplane.

== Cast ==
- Raymond Walburn as Henry Latham
- Walter Catlett as Mayor George Colton
- Gary Gray as David Latham
- Florence Bates as Minerva Bobbin
- Barbara Brown as Mrs. Latham
- M'liss McClure as Barbara Latham
- James Brown as Bob
- Georgie Nokes as Georgie Colton
- Carl Milletaire as Gordon Bennett
- Tom Dugan as Benny
- Billy Bletcher as Haggarly
- Maxine Semon as Miss Wells
- Don Hicks as Charlie Twitchell
- Joan Valerie as Blonde

== Reception ==
In a contemporary review, the Los Angeles Times wrote: "When Walter Catlett and Raymond Walburn have any comedy to put over, they do so with a bang; and they have plenty of it in this one. ... If there is any fault to be found with the film it is that all the comedians work a little too hard at being funny."
