= Ray Montgomery (actor) =

American actor (1922–1998)

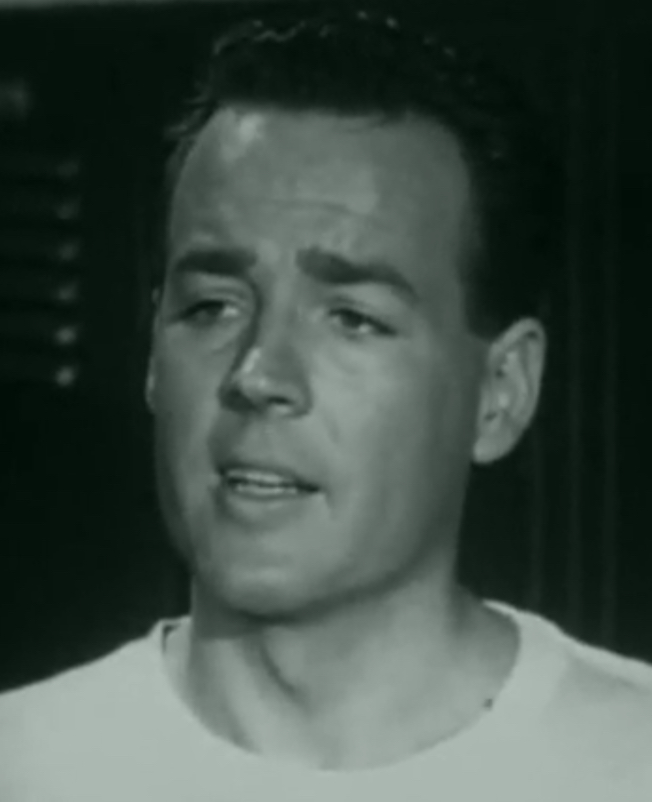
- Montgomery in Gruen Guild Playhouse (1951)
- Born: May 27, 1922
- Died: June 4, 1998 (aged 76); Santa Barbara, California, U.S.
- Resting place: Hillcrest Memorial Park, Kern County, California
- Occupation: Actor
- Years active: 1941–1990
- Spouse: Jean Trent (m. 1959)

Ray Montgomery (May 27, 1922 – June 4, 1998) was an American actor.

== Early life ==
He graduated from Los Angeles High School in June 1940. Upon graduation from high school, he studied journalism at the University of Southern California. He was the winner of the 1940 national declamation finals in the National Forensic League Tournament at Terre Haute, Indiana.

Montgomery was in a cadet in the Naval Reserve Officers Training Corps while at the University of Southern California. He was in the Merchant Marine Naval Reserve during World War II, serving from October 1942 to August 1945.

== Career ==
When he was 18 and still in college, Montgomery played Noel Chandler in the soap opera Dear John. Montgomery had the role of Professor Howard Ogden in the syndicated children's adventure series Ramar of the Jungle in 1952–1953. Ogden was a colleague of the main character, Dr. Tom Reynolds (called "Ramar" by the natives). He starred in the pilot of The West Point Story, a syndicated program about cadets at the United States Military Academy, and appeared in the premiere episode of Alfred Hitchcock Presents, October 2, 1955. In 1955 Montgomery appeared as Morton Scott in the TV western Cheyenne in the episode titled "Julesburg." In 1960, he portrayed a police officer in The Tom Ewell Show episode "The Safety Lesson."

=== Post-acting career ===
In 1957, Montgomery left acting to join Ad-Staff Inc., a "Hollywood firm specializing in creation and production of jingles and other radio and tv spots," as the TV coordinator for the firm's Canada Dry account in the West.

== Personal life and death ==
Montgomery was married to actress Jean Trent, a "beautiful Universal starlet." He died in 1998 at the age of 76 in Santa Barbara, California and was buried with his wife in Hillcrest Memorial Park, Kern County, California.

== Selected filmography ==
- You're in the Army Now (1941) – Soldier (uncredited)
- All Through the Night (1942) – Reporter (uncredited)
- Captains of the Clouds (1942) – Aircraftsman Hodges (uncredited)
- Bullet Scars (1942) – News Photographer at Shootout (uncredited)
- The Male Animal (1942) – Student (uncredited)
- Murder in the Big House (1942) – Young Reporter (uncredited)
- Larceny, Inc. (1942) – Second Customer (uncredited)
- Wings for the Eagle (1942) – Young Man Talking to Jake (uncredited)
- The Gay Sisters (1942) – Joe, Records Clerk (uncredited)
- The Hard Way (1943) – Johnny Gilpin (uncredited)
- Air Force (1943) – Assistant Radio Operator
- Action in the North Atlantic (1943) – Aherne (scenes deleted)
- Murder on the Waterfront (1943) – Forceful Sailor (uncredited)
- Deception (1946) – Wedding Guest (uncredited)
- The Unfaithful (1947) – Ray, Hunter's Assistant (uncredited)
- Dark Passage (1947) – Theatre Usher in Trailer (uncredited)
- The Unsuspected (1947) – Reporter (uncredited)
- That Hagen Girl (1947) – Jimmy / Romeo, College Student in Play (uncredited)
- To the Victor (1948) – Soldier (uncredited)
- Silver River (1948) – Young Man (uncredited)
- Wallflower (1948) – Chester aka Chet (uncredited)
- Romance on the High Seas (1948) – Michael's Assistant (uncredited)
- The Big Punch (1948) – Man Reading Newspaper (uncredited)
- Embraceable You (1948) – Ambulance Driver (uncredited)
- Johnny Belinda (1948) – Tim Moore (uncredited)
- Smart Girls Don't Talk (1948) – Tommy, Auto Park Attendant (uncredited)
- June Bride (1948) – Jim Mitchell
- Fighter Squadron (1948) – Corporal Walsh (uncredited)
- Whiplash (1948) – Press Man (uncredited)
- One Sunday Afternoon (1948) – Young Man in Park (uncredited)
- John Loves Mary (1949) – Elevator Operator / Trailer Host (uncredited)
- South of St. Louis (1949) – Soldier (uncredited)
- A Kiss in the Dark (1949) – Chet Hale (uncredited)
- The Girl from Jones Beach (1949) – Miss Brooks' Dancing Escort (uncredited)
- It's a Great Feeling (1949) – Raoul Walsh's Assistant (uncredited)
- Task Force (1949) – Pilot
- White Heat (1949) – Ernie (uncredited)
- The House Across the Street (1949) – Reporter (uncredited)
- The Lady Takes a Sailor (1949) – Lab Assistant (uncredited)
- Backfire (1950) – Attendant (uncredited)
- Tomahawk (1950) – Blair Streeter (uncredited)
- Mr. Belvedere Rings the Bell (1951) – Reporter (uncredited)
- People Will Talk (1951) – Doctor (uncredited)
- Love Nest (1951) – Mr. Gray (uncredited)
- Starlift (1951) – Captain Nelson, Pilot (uncredited)
- The Las Vegas Story (1952) – Desk Clerk
- Bugles in the Afternoon (1952) – Osborne (uncredited)
- Diplomatic Courier (1952) – Co-Pilot (uncredited)
- Down Among the Sheltering Palms (1952) – Lieutenant Everty (uncredited)
- One Minute to Zero (1952) – (uncredited)
- Monkey Business (1952) as Policeman (uncredited)
- Stars and Stripes Forever (1952) as Maine Non-Commissioned Officer, Major's Aide (uncredited)
- The I Don't Care Girl (1953) as Army Lieutenant (uncredited)
- Column South (1953) – Trooper Keit (uncredited)
- Pickup on South Street (1953) – Ray, FBI Agent (uncredited)
- Gentlemen Prefer Blondes (1953) – Peters, Olympic Team (uncredited)
- Bandits of the West (1953) – Steve Edrington
- Sabre Jet (1953) – Major James Daniel
- Ramar of the Jungle (1953–1954, TV Series) – Professor Howard Ogden
- Alfred Hitchcock Presents (1955) (Season 1 Episode 1: "Revenge") - Man in Gray Suit
- Sincerely Yours (1955) – Mr. Neff (scenes deleted)
- Hilda Crane (1956) – Hilda's Acquaintance on Train (uncredited)
- Between Heaven and Hell (1956) – Medic (uncredited)
- Three Brave Men (1956) – Sanford (uncredited)
- Bombers B-52 (1957) – Barnes
- Kiss Them for Me (1957) – Lieutenant (junior grade) (uncredited)
- Peyton Place (1957) – Naval Officer (uncredited)
- The Silent Service (1957) (Season 1 Episode 4: "The U.S.S. Sculpin Story") - Lieutenant N.J. Allen
- The Silent Service (1957) (Season 1 Episode 38: "The Loss of the Perch") - Lieutenant J.F. Ryder
- The Silent Service (1958) (Season 2 Episode 15: "The Hawkbill's Revenge") - Captain Ben Jarvis
- The Silent Service (1958) (Season 2 Episode 23: "The Crevalle's Mine Plant") - Bill Ruhe
- In Love and War (1958) – Lieutenant (uncredited)
- A Private's Affair (1959) – Captain Hickman
- The FBI Story (1959) – Driver (uncredited)
- Alfred Hitchcock Presents (1960) (Season 6 Episode 6: "Pen Pal") - Doctor
- Cash McCall (1960) – Reporter (uncredited)
- Rawhide (1960) (Season 2 Episode 17: "Incident of the Tinker's Dam") - Corporal Anderson
- Rawhide (1961) (Season 3 Episode 10: "Incident of the Buffalo Soldier") - Lieutenant Howard
- Rawhide (1962) (Season 4 Episode 16: "The Woman Trap") - Lieutenant Keown
- Alfred Hitchcock Presents (1962) (Season 7 Episode 18: "The Woman Who Wanted to Live") - Fred the Gas Station Attendant
- House of Women (1962) – Mr. Everett (uncredited)
- Critic's Choice (1963) – Actor in 'Week End' (uncredited)
- A Gathering of Eagles (1963) – Captain Line (uncredited)
- Wagon Train (1963) – George
- Kisses for My President (1964) – Reporter (uncredited)
- Brainstorm (1965) – Charlie, Gate Guard (uncredited)
- The Silencers (1966) – Agent 'C' (uncredited)
- Not with My Wife, You Don't! (1966) – Staff Officer (uncredited)
- A Guide for the Married Man (1967) – Party Guest #5
- Madigan (1968) – Detective O'Mara
