= Shaggy (film) =

1948 film by Robert Emmett Tansey

- Australian film poster
- Directed by: Robert Emmett Tansey
- Screenplay by: Maxwell Shane
- Produced by: William H. Pine; William C. Thomas
- Starring: Brenda Joyce; Georgie Nokes; Robert Shayne; Jody Gilbert; Ralph Sanford; Alex Frazer
- Cinematography: Ellis W. Carter
- Edited by: Howard A. Smith
- Music by: Raoul Kraushaar
- Production company: Pine-Thomas Productions
- Distributed by: Paramount Pictures
- Release date: June 11, 1948
- Running time: 72 minutes
- Country: United States
- Language: English
- Budget: $250,000 to $300,000

Shaggy is a 1948 American drama film directed by Robert Emmett Tansey, written by Maxwell Shane and filmed in Cinecolor. The film stars Brenda Joyce, Georgie Nokes, Robert Shayne, Jody Gilbert, Ralph Sanford and Alex Frazer. The film was released on June 11, 1948, by Paramount Pictures.

== Plot ==
The film follows the story of a rancher's son, Robbie, his dog Shaggy and adventures they have with ranching neighbors and wild animals in the U.S. west.

== Cast ==
- Brenda Joyce as Laura Calvin
- Georgie Nokes as Robbie Calvin
- Robert Shayne as Bob Calvin
- Jody Gilbert as Tessie
- Ralph Sanford as Fuzzy
- Alex Frazer as Mac
- William Haade as Gonnell
- Dan White as Joe Simms

== Production ==
The budget was larger than for a typical film from Pine-Thomas Productions, ranging from $250,000 to $300,000.
