= Houseley Stevenson =

British-American actor (1879–1953)

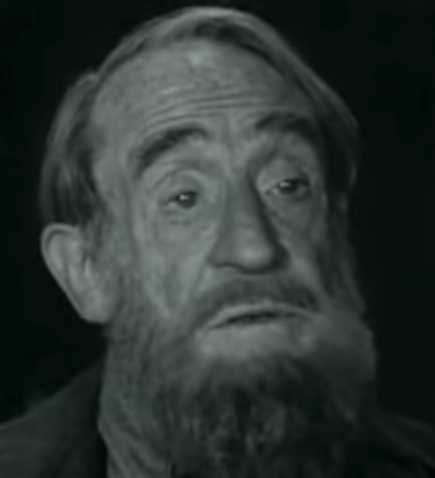
- Stevenson in Gruen Guild Playhouse (1951)
- Born: 30 July 1879; London, England
- Died: 6 August 1953 (aged 74); Duarte, California, U.S.
- Occupation: Actor
- Years active: 1936–1954
- Spouse: Margurita E. Behrens
- Children: 3, including Onslow Stevens

Houseley Stevenson (30 July 1879 – 6 August 1953) was a British-American character actor who was born in London on July 30, 1879, and died in Duarte, California on August 6, 1953.

He began his movie career in 1936 and had a short career in early television productions. Stevenson performed in live stage productions in New York under the name Houseley Stevens. He was a resident teacher at the Pasadena Playhouse in California. He was the father of actors Houseley Stevenson Jr., Edward Stevenson and Onslow Stevens.

== Films ==
1. The Law in Her Hands (1936) – Appellate Court Chief Judge (uncredited)
2. The White Angel (1936) – Surgeon (uncredited)
3. Bengal Tiger (1936) – Justice of the Peace (uncredited)
4. China Clipper (1936) – Doctor (uncredited)
5. Isle of Fury (1936) – The Rector
6. Once a Doctor (1937) – Magistrate Kendrick
7. Stolen Holiday (1937) – Wedding Official (uncredited)
8. Midnight Court (1937) – Mr. Jones - Witness (uncredited)
9. The Adventurous Blonde (1937) – Judge Darrell (uncredited)
10. The Body Disappears (1941) – Passerby Professor (uncredited)
11. The Man Who Returned to Life (1942) – Colonel Beebe (uncredited)
12. Native Land (1942, Documentary) – white sharecropper
13. Crime Doctor (1943) – Martin, Parole Board (uncredited)
14. Happy Land (1943) – Sam Watson (uncredited)
15. Dakota (1945) – Railroad Clerk (uncredited)
16. Without Reservations (1946) – Turnkey (uncredited)
17. Somewhere in the Night (1946) – Michael Conroy
18. Rendezvous with Annie (1946) – Dr. Grimes (uncredited)
19. Little Miss Big (1946) – Duncan
20. The Yearling (1946) – Mr. Ranger (uncredited)
21. Easy Come, Easy Go (1947) – Doctor (uncredited)
22. The Brasher Doubloon (1947) – Elisha Morningstar (uncredited)
23. Ramrod (1947) – George Smedley
24. Time Out of Mind (1947) – George
25. The Ghost and Mrs. Muir (1947) – Gardener (uncredited)
26. Cheyenne (1947) – Stableman (uncredited)
27. Thunder in the Valley (1947) – Angus MacIvor (uncredited)
28. Dark Passage (1947) – Dr. Walter Coley
29. Forever Amber (1947) – Mr. Starling (uncredited)
30. Secret Beyond the Door (1947) – Andy (uncredited)
31. The Challenge (1948) – Captain Sonnenberg
32. Smart Woman (1948) – Joe Smith (uncredited)
33. Casbah (1948) – Anton Duval
34. Four Faces West (1948) – Anderson
35. The Vicious Circle (1948) – Professor Barr (uncredited)
36. Moonrise (1948) – Uncle Joe Jingle
37. Apartment for Peggy (1948) – Prof. T.J. Beck (uncredited)
38. You Gotta Stay Happy (1948) – Jud Tavis
39. Joan of Arc (1948) – The Cardinal of Winchester
40. Kidnapped (1948) – Ebenezer
41. The Paleface (1948) – Pioneer (uncredited)
42. Knock on Any Door (1949) – Junior (uncredited)
43. The Walking Hills (1949) – King
44. Bride of Vengeance (1949) – Councillor
45. The Lady Gambles (1949) – Pawnbroker
46. Colorado Territory (1949) – Prospector
47. Take One False Step (1949) – Dr. Montgomery, Thatcher
48. Sorrowful Jones (1949) – Doc Chesley
49. Leave It to Henry (1949) – Mr. McCluskey
50. Calamity Jane and Sam Bass (1949) – Dakota
51. Masked Raiders (1949) – Uncle Henry Trevett
52. The Gal Who Took the West (1949) – Ted
53. Song of Surrender (1949) – Mr. Abernathy (uncredited)
54. All the King's Men (1949) – Madison – the Editor (uncredited)
55. Sierra (1950) – Sam Coulter
56. The Gunfighter (1950) – Mr. Barlow (uncredited)
57. Edge of Doom (1950) – Mr. Swanson
58. The Sun Sets at Dawn (1950) – Pops
59. The Du Pont Story (1950) – Henry du Pont's Assistant (uncredited)
60. Hollywood Story (1951) – John Miller
61. As Young as You Feel (1951) – Old Man on Park Bench (uncredited)
62. The Secret of Convict Lake (1951) – Samuel 'Pawnee Sam' Barlow (uncredited)
63. Darling, How Could You! (1951) – Old Man (uncredited)
64. All That I Have (1951) – Dr. Charles Grayson
65. Cave of Outlaws (1951) – Cooley
66. The Wild North (1952) – Old Man
67. Oklahoma Annie (1952) – Blinky

== Television ==
- Kraft Television Theatre

Episode: Barchester Towers (1948)
Episode:Spring Green (1948)

- Front Page Detective (1951–1952)

Episode: Galahad (date unknown)

- Family Theater

Episode: That I May See (1951)

- Gruen Playhouse

Episode: Joe Santa Claus (1951) – Uncle Willy

- Rebound (1952–1953)

Episode: The Old Man (date unknown) – Charles

- Adventures of Superman

Episode: Rescue (1952) – Pop Polgase

== Stage work ==
Partial listing

Theatre
Opening date	Closing date	Title	Role	Theatre	Notes
March 22, 1938	May 1938	Schoolhouse on the Lot	J.G. Hamilton	Ritz Theatre NY	Jerome Chodorov and Joseph Fields playwrights Onslow Stevens also in the cast as Peter Driscoll
June 15, 1938	Nov 1938	On the Rocks	Viscount Barking	Daly's 63rd Street Theatre NY	George Bernard Shaw playwright Produced by the Federal Theatre Project
March 19, 1939	March 19, 1939	Stop Press	Alfred Snell	Vanderbilt Theatre NY	John Stradley playwright The role of Alfred Snell was that of a conservative newspaper publisher who was at odds with his son the union sympathizer
September 10, 1939	September 30, 1939	Journey's End	Bert	Empire Theatre NY	R. C. Sherriff playwright Set in Saint-Quentin, Aisne during World War I
October 25, 1939	October 19, 1940	The Time of Your Life	Arab	Booth Theatre NY	William Saroyan playwright The playbill described the character of Arab as "an Eastern philosopher and harmonica player"
March 26, 1946		Volpone	Corbaccio	Las Palmas Theater, Hollywood	Ben Jonson playwright adapted by Morris Carnovsky
