= Father's Wild Game =

1950 film directed by Herbert I. Leeds

- Directed by: Herbert I. Leeds
- Screenplay by: D.D. Beauchamp
- Based on: A-Hunting We Will Go by D.D. Beauchamp
- Produced by: Peter Scully
- Starring: Raymond Walburn; Walter Catlett; Gary Gray; Jane Darwell; Barbara Brown; M'liss McClure
- Cinematography: Karl Struss
- Edited by: Carlo Lodato
- Production company: Mayfair Productions Inc.
- Distributed by: Monogram Pictures
- Release date: November 22, 1950
- Running time: 61 minutes
- Country: United States
- Language: English

Father's Wild Game is a 1950 American comedy film directed by Herbert I. Leeds and written by D.D. Beauchamp. The film stars Raymond Walburn, Walter Catlett, Gary Gray, Jane Darwell, Barbara Brown and M'liss McClure. It was released on November 22, 1950 by Monogram Pictures.

== Cast ==
- Raymond Walburn as Henry Latham
- Walter Catlett as Mayor George Colton
- Gary Gray as David Latham
- Jane Darwell as Minverva Bobbin
- Barbara Brown as Mrs. Edna Latham
- M'liss McClure as Barbara Latham
- Fred Libby as Cass McCreary
- Georgie Nokes as Georgie Colton
- Roscoe Ates as Rancher
- Ralph Sanford as Policeman
- Emmett Vogan as Postmaster
- Maxine Semon as Mayor's Secretary
- Doris Kemper as Mrs. McCreary
- Ann Tyrrell as Tilda
