= April Showers (1948 film) =

1948 film by James V. Kern

- Theatrical release poster
- Directed by: James V. Kern
- Screenplay by: Peter Milne
- Story by: Joe Laurie Jr.
- Produced by: William Jacobs
- Starring: Jack Carson; Ann Sothern; Robert Alda; S. Z. Sakall; Robert Ellis; Richard Rober
- Cinematography: Carl E. Guthrie
- Edited by: Thomas Reilly
- Music by: Ray Heindorf; Max Steiner
- Production company: Warner Bros. Pictures
- Distributed by: Warner Bros. Pictures
- Release date: March 27, 1948
- Running time: 94 minutes
- Country: United States
- Language: English
- Box office: $1,750,000 (US rentals)

April Showers is a 1948 American musical film directed by James V. Kern and written by Peter Milne. The film stars Jack Carson, Ann Sothern, Robert Alda, S. Z. Sakall, Robert Ellis and Richard Rober. The film was released by Warner Bros. on March 27, 1948.

April Showers was based in great part on the vaudeville career of Buster Keaton, who sued Warner Bros. Pictures and received only $3500.

== Plot ==
June and Joe Tyme have a song and dance act that is stale. Their son, Buster, returns from boarding school and finds his parents out of work. He begs them to let him join the act. June relents, although she hoped her son would never work in vaudeville.

Young Buster has talent, and the family is a hit with audiences in many cities. When the family is offered a booking in New York City, it fulfills a lifelong dream of Joe's to play on Broadway.

New York prohibits child labor, so Buster pretends to be an adult midget when he is backstage. The ruse fails. His parents perform without him, flop, and leave New York.

Bitterly disappointed, Joe drinks too much and misses a performance. After that, theater managers will not hire him. Joe suggests that Billy Shay replace him in the act so that Buster and June can continue performing.

June worked for Billy before she married Joe, and she does not trust Billy. However, the act continues to be a success with Billy in it. Frustrated and embarrassed, Joe leaves June, telling her she should divorce him and marry Billy. Billy says the same thing to June, many times.

After returning from performances in another city, Buster finds his father and see that Joe is barely scraping by. Joe lies to Buster about upcoming work and sends his son away.

Buster, June, and Billy are asked to join a musical comedy, a major production that will be a big break for the act. During a final rehearsal, though, the director decides to cut the act because it is too similar to other acts in the show.

Buster saves the act again. He suggests that a comic dance, instead, would liven up the show. He suggests a routine he used to do with Joe. The director immediately agrees, and asks Billy whether he knows the routine. Billy lies and says he taught that routine to Joe, but he needs a day to brush up.

Billy makes Buster teach him the routine, but Billy cannot do it well. Both are frustrated after several hours, and Buster tries to leave. At that moment, Joe arrives, planning to tell Billy that he should marry June. He arrives in time to hear Billy slapping Buster repeatedly. Joe rescues his son and fights with Billy.

The next day, the director hears what happened and allows Joe to perform with Buster and June. Their act gets big laughs again, and the family is reunited.

== Cast ==
- Jack Carson as Joe Tyme
- Ann Sothern as June Tyme
- Robert Alda as Billy Shay
- S. Z. Sakall as Mr. Curley
- Robert Ellis as Buster Tyme
- Richard Rober as Al Wilson
- Joseph Crehan as William Barnes
- Billy Curtis as Capt. Rudolph L. Nemo
- John Gallaudet as Mr. Gordon
- Philip Van Zandt as Harry Swift
- Ray Walker as Mr. Barclay
- M'liss McClure

== Release ==
April Showers was the first theatrical film to be premiered on Zenith's first pay subscription service, Phonevision in Chicago when the service launched on January 1, 1950.

== Reception ==
Bosley Crowther of The New York Times reviewed the film negatively, criticizing the vaudeville plot as "an insufferable tale" and the acting by Carson, Sothern, and Ellis as poor.
