= Fighting Back (1948 film) =

1948 film by Malcolm St. Clair

- Directed by: Malcolm St. Clair
- Screenplay by: John Stone
- Produced by: Sol M. Wurtzel
- Starring: Paul Langton; Jean Rogers; Gary Gray; Joe Sawyer; Morris Ankrum; John Kellogg
- Cinematography: Benjamin H. Kline
- Edited by: William F. Claxton
- Music by: Darrell Calker
- Production company: 20th Century Fox
- Distributed by: 20th Century Fox
- Release date: July 30, 1948
- Running time: 66 minutes
- Country: United States
- Language: English

Fighting Back is a 1948 American drama film directed by Malcolm St. Clair and written by John Stone. The film stars Paul Langton, Jean Rogers, Gary Gray, Joe Sawyer, Morris Ankrum and John Kellogg. The film was released on July 30, 1948, by 20th Century Fox.

== Plot ==
Nick Sanders (Paul Langdon) comes home from the war and needs a job. His wife June (Jean Rogers) has set up an interview with her boss, Larry Higby (Morris Ankrum), who runs a textile mill. Nick makes his potential employer aware that he was in prison previously, serving two extra years in the military to get his record cleared.

The men get along because their sons are already friends. Mrs. Higby (Dorothy Christy) is uncomfortable with this arrangement, however. Nick not only works for Higby but also coaches the boys' baseball team. Larry (Tommy Ivo) has a physical condition that makes it difficult to participate, but Nick makes sure that he does so.

A bracelet belonging to Mrs. Higby is stolen. An old prison acquaintance who shows up, Sam Lang (John Kellogg), is responsible, but Nick comes under suspicion. Police Sgt. Scudder (John Sawyer) investigates and the mystery of the theft is cleared up just in time, with the assistance of Nick's clever performing dog.

== Cast ==
- Paul Langton as Nick Sanders
- Jean Rogers as June Sanders
- Gary Gray as Jimmy Sanders
- Joe Sawyer as Police Sergeant Scudder
- Morris Ankrum as Robert J. Higby
- John Kellogg as Sam Lang
- Dorothy Christy as Martha Higby
- Tommy Ivo as Larry Higby
- Lelah Tyler as Mrs. Winkle
- Pierre Watkin as Colonel
