= She Couldn't Say No (1954 film) =

1954 film by Lloyd Bacon

- Theatrical release poster
- Directed by: Lloyd Bacon
- Screenplay by: D. D. Beauchamp, William Bowers; Richard Flournoy
- Based on: Enough for Happiness; 1951 American Magazine story by D. D. Beauchamp
- Produced by: Robert Sparks
- Starring: Robert Mitchum; Jean Simmons; Arthur Hunnicutt
- Cinematography: Harry J. Wild
- Edited by: George Amy
- Music by: Roy Webb
- Production company: RKO Pictures
- Distributed by: RKO Pictures
- Release date: February 15, 1954 (US)
- Running time: 88 minutes
- Country: United States
- Language: English

She Couldn't Say No is a 1954 American rural comedy film starring Robert Mitchum, Jean Simmons and Arthur Hunnicutt. It was the last film in the long directing career of Lloyd Bacon to be released. (The last film he directed was the musical The French Line starring Jane Russell.)

She Couldn't Say No was later re-released as Beautiful but Dangerous.

== Plot ==
Wealthy Corby Lane (Jean Simmons) visits the hamlet of Progress, Arkansas, whose residents had paid for a critical medical operation for her when she was a child. She decides to express her gratitude by giving them money anonymously. The headstrong woman clashes with the local doctor, Robert Sellers (Robert Mitchum), who foresees the resulting chaos.

== Cast ==
- Robert Mitchum as Dr. Robert "Doc" Sellers
- Jean Simmons as Corby Lane, also known as Corby Johnson
- Arthur Hunnicutt as Otey Chalmers
- Edgar Buchanan as Ad Meeker
- Wallace Ford as Joe Whelan
- Raymond Walburn as Judge Holbert
- Jimmy Hunt as Digger
- Ralph Dumke as sheriff
- Hope Landin as Mrs. McMurty
- Gus Schilling as Ed Gruman
- Eleanor Todd as Sally Watson
- Pinky Tomlin as Elmer Wooley
- Dabbs Greer as Dick Jordan

== Production ==
Paramount Pictures originally purchased the property as a vehicle for William Holden, with Dick Powell scheduled to direct, but conflicts with Holden's schedule caused the studio to sell the rights to RKO. The working title for the film was changed from "A Likely Story" to "Beautiful but Dangerous" to avoid confusion with RKO's earlier film A Likely Story, released in 1946. Other working or alternate titles included "Enough for Happiness", "Murder", and "She Had to Say Yes". Principal photography took place between the middle of May and early June 1952.

Robert Mitchum disliked the script for the film so much that at one point he went on suspension to avoid appearing in it. It was not the last film he made for RKO, but it was his last RKO film to be released.
