= Jean Trent =

American actress (1920–2005)

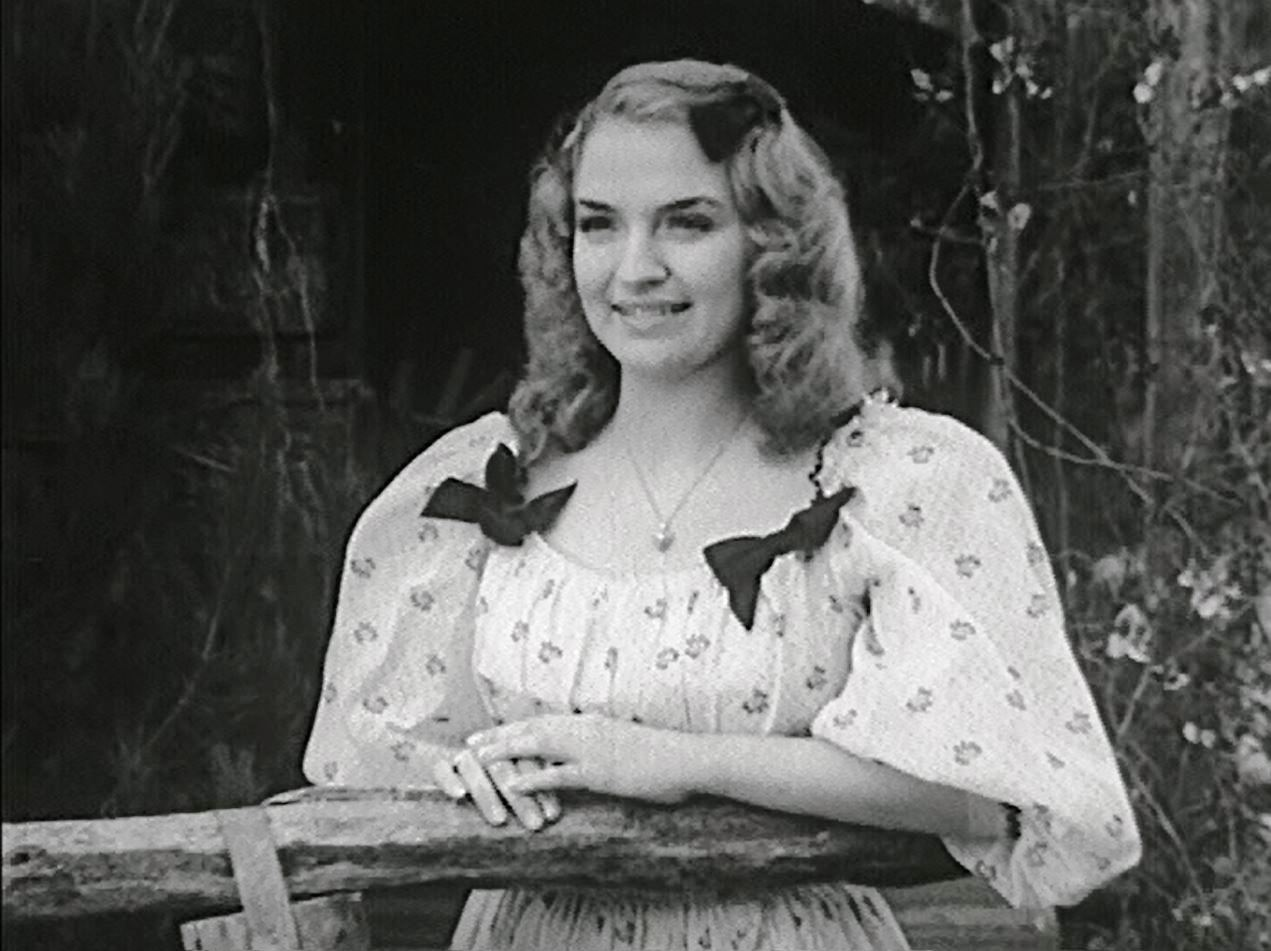
- Trent in Western Mail (1942)
- Born: September 20, 1920; Denver, Colorado, U.S.
- Died: April 10, 2005 (aged 84); Bakerfield, Kern County, California, U.S.
- Resting place: Hillcrest Memorial Park, Kern County, California
- Occupation: Actress
- Years active: 1942–1946
- Spouse: Ray Montgomery (m. 1959)

Jean Trent (September 20, 1920 – April 10, 2005) was an American film actress and the wife of actor Ray Montgomery. She is best known for her roles in Western Mail (1942) and Salome, Where She Danced (1945). She was referred as a "beautiful Universal starlet."

== Personal life and death ==
Trent was married to actor Ray Montgomery. She died in 2005 at the age of 84 in California and was buried with her husband in Hillcrest Memorial Park, Kern County, California.

== Selected filmography ==
- Western Mail (1942) - Julia Webster
- Saboteur (1942) - Blonde Aircraft Worker (uncredited)
- Sin Town (1942) - Dance Hall Girl (uncredited)
- Arabian Nights (1942) - Harem Girl (uncredited)
- Fired Wife (1943) - Divorcee (uncredited)
- The Great Alaskan Mystery (1944) - Secretary (uncredited)
- Babes on Swing Street (1944) - Photographer (uncredited)
- The Singing Sheriff (1944) - Nurse (uncredited)
- See My Lawyer (1945) - Woman in Dress Gag (uncredited)
- Salome, Where She Danced (1945) - Salome Girl (uncredited)
- Lady on a Train (1945) - Circus Club Hat Check Girl (uncredited)
- This Love of Ours (1945) - Chorus Girl (uncredited)
- Frontier Gal (1945) - Hostess (uncredited)
- Because of Him (1946) - Blonde (uncredited)
- Night in Paradise (1946) - Iris (uncredited)

== See also ==
- Pin-ups of Yank, the Army Weekly
