= D. D. Beauchamp =

American screenwriter (1908–1969)

Daniel D. Beauchamp (August 25, 1908 – March 20, 1969) was an American screenwriter for film and TV.

== Biography ==
Daniel D. Beachaump was born in Fairmount, Indiana, to Daniel D. Beauchamp and Alea Wigner.

In the 1930s, Beauchamp wrote fiction and published stories in The Saturday Evening Post. He published a short story titled "Journey at Sunrise" in Good Housekeeping, which was later adapted for the screen as Father Makes Good.

In 1933, Beauchamp was living in Helena, Montana. In September of that year, he married Eileen Sousa, the granddaughter of John Philip Sousa via his son John Philip Sousa Jr. Following the wedding, they planned to move to Mexico City.

== Filmography ==
=== Films ===
Year	Film	Credit	Notes	Ref.
1947	The Wistful Widow of Wagon Gap	Story	Co-Wrote Story with William Bowers	
1948	River Lady	Screenplay	Co-Wrote Screenplay with William Bowers	
1948	Feudin', Fussin' and A-Fightin'	Story, Screenplay		
1949	Henry, the Rainmaker	Story		
1949	Leave It to Henry	Story, Screenplay		
1950	Father Makes Good	Written	Based on his story "Journey at Sunrise"	
1950	The Golden Gloves Story	Story	Co-Wrote Story with William F. Sellers	
1950	Abbott and Costello in the Foreign Legion	Story		
1950	Father's Wild Game	Story, Screenplay	Based on his story "A-Hunting We Will Go"	
1951	Belle Le Grand	Screenplay		
1951	Father Takes the Air	Screenplay		
1952	The San Francisco Story	Screenplay	Based on the 1949 novel Vigilante by Richard Summers	
1953	Gunsmoke	Screenplay	Based on the novel Roughshod By Norman A. Fox	
1953	Abbott and Costello Go to Mars	Story, Screenplay	Co-Wrote Screenplay with Howard Christie and John Grant	
1953	Law and Order	Screenplay	Co-Wrote Screenplay with John Bagni and Gwen Bagni	
1953	Son of Belle Starr	Screenplay	Co-Wrote Screenplay with Jack DeWitt and William Raynor	
1953	The Man from the Alamo	Screenplay	Co-Wrote Screenplay with Steve Fisher	
1953	The All American	Screenplay		
1954	She Couldn’t Say No	Story, Screenplay	Co-Wrote Screenplay with William Bowers and Richard Flournoy	
1954	Ride Clear of Diablo	Screenplay	Additional Dialogue	
1954	Rails Into Laramie	Screenplay	Co-Wrote Screenplay with Joseph Hoffman	
1954	Jesse James' Women	Story, Screenplay	Co-Wrote Screenplay with Don "Red" Barry and William R. Cox	
1954	Destry	Screenplay	Based on the novel Destry Rides Again By Max Brand, Co-Wrote Screenplay with Edmund H. North	
1954	Port of Hell	Story	Co-Wrote Story with Gil Doud	
1955	Man Without a Star	Screenplay	Based on the novel of the same name by Dee Linford, Co-Wrote Screenplay with Borden Chase	
1955	Tennessee's Partner	Screenplay	Based on the short story "Tennessee's Partner" By Bret Harte	
1956	Massacre	Screenplay		
1956	The Rawhide Years	Screenplay	Co-Wrote Screenplay with Earl Felton and Robert Presnell, Jr.	
1956	Yaqui Drums	Screenplay	Co-Wrote Screenplay with Jo Pagano	
1957	Shoot-Out at Medicine Bend	Written	Co-Wrote Screenplay with John Tucker Battle	
1960	For the Love of Mike	Written		
1960	Natchez Trace	Story, Screenplay	Co-Wrote Story and Screenplay with William R. Cox	
1966	Daniel Boone: Frontier Trail Rider	Story, Screenplay	Co-Wrote Screenplay with Jack Guss	
1968	A Man Called Gannon	Screenplay	Co-Wrote Screenplay with Borden Chase and Gene R. Kearney	
1972	The Bull of The West	Screenplay		

=== Television ===
Year	TV Series	Credit	Notes
1953	Four Star Playhouse	Writer	2 Episodes
1955	Crown Theatre with Gloria Swanson	Writer	1 Episode
1955	So This Is Hollywood	Writer	1 Episode
1955	Father Knows Best	Writer	1 Episode
1955-56	Cheyenne	Writer	2 Episodes
1956	Screen Directors Playhouse	Writer	1 Episode
1956	Celebrity Playhouse	Writer	2 Episodes
1956	Ford Television Theater	Writer	1 Episode
1957	Zane Grey Theater	Writer	1 Episode
1957-59	Trackdown	Writer	7 Episodes
1958	Yancy Derringer	Writer	
1958	Telephone Time	Writer	1 Episode
1958-59	Tales of Wells Fargo	Writer	3 Episodes
1958-60	Bat Masterson	Writer	4 Episodes
1959	Tombstone Territory	Writer	1 Episode
1959-60	Wanted: Dead or Alive	Writer	9 Episodes
1960-61	Stagecoach West	Writer, Story Consultant	38 Episodes
1962	Rawhide	Writer	1 Episode
1962	The Tall Man	Writer	1 Episode
1963	Temple Houston	Writer	1 Episode
1963	The Virginian	Writer	1 Episode
1965-69	Daniel Boone	Writer	29 Episodes
1967	Gentle Ben	Writer	1 Episode
