= Paul Langton =

American actor (1913–1980)

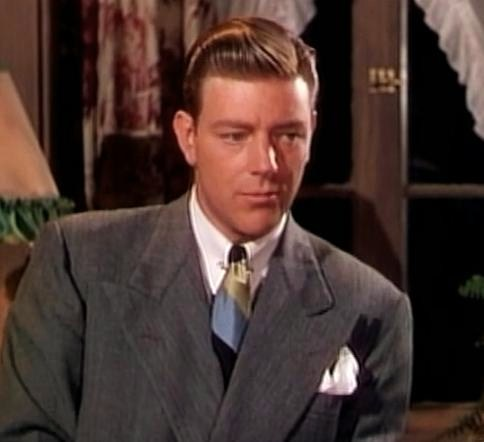
- Langton in Till the Clouds Roll By (1946)
- Born: April 17, 1913
- Died: April 15, 1980 (aged 66); Burbank, California, U.S.
- Education: California School of Fine Arts
- Occupation: Actor
- Spouse: Elda Piva

Paul Langton (April 17, 1913 – April 15, 1980) was an American actor perhaps best known for his role as Leslie Harrington on the television series Peyton Place.

== Early years ==
When Langton was 12 years old he moved from Salt Lake City to San Francisco to be with his father, Ernest Langton, a former vaudevillian who then worked in the mailing department of the San Francisco Examiner. He attended Lowell High School and the California School of Fine Arts in San Francisco, California. He worked in the press rooms of The Salt Lake Telegram and the Examiner to finance his education.

== Career ==
Langton's early stage experience included acting in productions of the Mountain Play Association in California and the Pasadena Playhouse. In 1950 he portrayed Biff in a touring company of Death of a Salesman. He performed on Broadway in Harbor Lights (1956).

Making his movie bow in 1941, Langton became a contract player at Metro-Goldwyn-Mayer, frequently appearing in war films. Later, Langton was seen in character parts or supporting roles in such films as The Incredible Shrinking Man (1957). He also was a voice actor on Lux Radio Theatre from 1942 to 1954.

Langton began appearing on television in 1951 in a series called The Web. His first regular role was that of Walter Dennis on the daytime series The Brighter Day. He also made five guest appearances on Perry Mason from 1958 to 1962, three of which were as prosecuting attorneys. But it was the role of Leslie Harrington on the prime time serial Peyton Place (1964–68) that finally gave him a level of stardom. After he was written out of the series, he appeared in half a dozen other programs including It Takes a Thief (1968), Ironside (TV series) and, in his final role, Emergency!, before retiring due to ill health.

== Personal life and death ==
Langton was married to Elda Piva. He died in Burbank, California on April 15, 1980, aged 66, two days before his 67th birthday. Langton was a Mormon.

== Filmography ==
Films
Year	Title	Role	Notes
1943	We've Never Been Licked	Naval Officer	Uncredited
1943	First Comes Courage	Minor Role	Uncredited
1943	The Cross of Lorraine	French Soldier	Uncredited
1943	Destination Tokyo	'Copperfin' Crewman / Barber	Uncredited
1944	Marriage Is a Private Affair	Soldier	Uncredited
1944	Thirty Seconds Over Tokyo	Captain 'Ski' York	
1944	The Thin Man Goes Home	Tom Clayworth	Uncredited
1944	Dark Shadows	Peter Selkin, Suspect	Short crime drama film unrelated to later supernatural TV series; uncredited
1944	Gentle Annie	Violet Goss	
1945	This Man's Navy	Minor Role	Uncredited
1945	The Hidden Eye	Barry Gifford	
1945	Purity Squad	Mr. Winthrop	Short film, Uncredited
1945	What Next, Corporal Hargrove?	Captain Drake	
1945	They Were Expendable	Ensign 'Andy' Andrews	
1946	Magic on a Stick	John Walker	Short film, Uncredited
1946	The Hoodlum Saint	Bit Part	(scenes deleted)
1946	Courage of Lassie	Minor Role	Uncredited
1946	Till the Clouds Roll By	Oscar Hammerstein II	Fictionalized M-G-M musical biopic of composer Jerome Kern
1947	My Brother Talks to Horses	Mr. Gillespie	
1947	The Sea of Grass	Young Doctor	Uncredited
1947	The Romance of Rosy Ridge	Tom Yeary	
1947	For You I Die	Johnny Coulter	
1948	Fighting Back	Nick Sanders	
1948	A Song Is Born	Joe	
1948	Trouble Preferred	Ed Poole	
1953	Big Leaguer	Brian McLennan	
1953	Jack Slade	Dan Traver	
1954	Return from the Sea	Lieutenant Commander Frank Manley	
1954	The Snow Creature	Dr. Frank Parrish	
1955	Dr. Harvey W. Wiley	Harvey W. Wiley	TV movie; episode of Hallmark Hall of Fame
1955	Murder Is My Beat	Ray Patrick	
1955	To Hell and Back	Colonel Howe	
1955	The Big Knife	Buddy Bliss	
1957	Utah Blaine	Rip Coker	
1957	The Incredible Shrinking Man	Charlie Carey	
1957	Calypso Heat Wave	Mack Adams	
1957	Chicago Confidential	Police Captain Jake Parker	
1958	Girl in the Woods	Luke Plummer	
1958	It! The Terror from Beyond Space	Lieutenant James Calder	
1959	The Cosmic Man	Colonel Matthews	
1959	Invisible Invaders	Lieutenant General Stone	
1959	The Last Angry Man	Jack Vickery	Uncredited
1960	The Big Night	Spencer	
1960	Three Came to Kill	Agent Ben Scanlon	
1963	Dime with a Halo	Mr. Jones	
1963	Twilight of Honor	Air Force Sergeant Kelly	Uncredited
1963	4 for Texas	Beauregard	
1964	Man's Favorite Sport?	Jim Stern	Uncredited
1964	Advance to the Rear	Major Forsythe	Uncredited
1964	Shock Treatment	Judge Knox	Uncredited
1964	Youngblood Hawke	Glenn Hawke	Uncredited
TV series
Year	Title	Role	Note
1951	Tales of Tomorrow		Season 1 Episode 7: "The Monsters"
1951–1954	Danger		Season 1 Episode 46: "Goodbye, Hannah" (1951) Season 2 Episode 4: "Sleep and Tell" (1951) Season 2 Episode 5: "Inherit Murder" (1951) Season 2 Episode 15: "Passage for Christmas" (1951) Season 2 Episode 33: "Border Incident" (1952) Season 4 Episode 20: "In Line of Duty" (1954)
1951–1954	Suspense	Winters / Dave Delaney	Season 3 Episode 41: "The Call" (1951) Season 3 Episode 46: "Tent on the Beach" (1951) Season 4 Episode 10: "Frisco Payoff" (1951) as Winters Season 4 Episode 14: "Pier 17" (1951) as Dave Delaney Season 4 Episode 44: "Death Cargo" (1952) Season 6 Episode 22: "Death on the Screen" (1954)
1951–1954	The Web		Season 1 Episode 48: "Cops Must Be Tough" (1951) Season 1 Episode 59: "The Edge of Terror" (1951) Season 2 Episode 15: "Sentence of Death" (1952) Season 2 Episode 25: "The Phantom of the Bridge" (1952) Season 2 Episode 31: "Prelude to Murder" (1952) Season 4 Episode 35: "Brush-Off" (1954)
1951–1956	Kraft Television Theatre		Season 5 Episode 4: "Irish Eyes" (1951) Season 7 Episode 27: "Two Weeks in the Country" (1954) Season 9 Episode 42: "Babies for Sale" (1956)
1952	Armstrong Circle Theatre		Season 2 Episode 30: "Troubled Sands"
1952	CBS Television Workshop		Season 1 Episode 14: "Rainy Day on Paradise Junction"
1952	Goodyear Television Playhouse		Season 1 Episode 17: "The Lantern Copy" Season 1 Episode 21: "The Trial of Steven Kent"
1952	The Doctor		Season 1 Episode 4: "The Baker Story" Season 1 Episode 17: "Marti"
1952–1953	Chevron Theatre	Mark Tracey	Season 1 Episode 50: "My Brother's Wife" (1952) Season 2 Episode 1: "Island of Stone" (1953) as Mark Tracey Season 2 Episode 3: "The Beautiful Miss X" (1953) Season 2 Episode 24: "The Worried Man" (1953)
1952–1955	Studio One	(1) Marsh Huddleston (2) Mike Barnaby (3) John Temple	Season 5 Episode 1: "The Kill" (1952) as (1) Season 6 Episode 20: "Herman, Come by Bomber" (1954) as (2) Season 7 Episode 22: "The Broken Spur" (1955) as (3)
1953	Fireside Theatre	Ben	Season 6 Episode 8: "Phantom of the Bridge"
1953	Your Jeweler's Showcase	Charlie Harris	Season 1 Episode 20: "Cell 14"
1953–1955	The Ford Television Theatre	Dr. Chuck Kennedy; Frank Johnson	Season 1 Episode 35: "The Jewel" (1953) as Dr. Chuck Kennedy Season 2 Episode 26: "The Taming of the Shrewd" (1954) Season 3 Episode 6: "The Road Ahead" (1954) Season 4 Episode 4: "Twelve to Eternity" (1955) as Frank Johnson
1953–1955	Letter to Loretta	(1) Fred Broc (2) Roy (3) Norvil Knox (4) Johnny Ames (5) Mark Hodges	Season 1 Episode 4: "Girl on a Flagpole" (1953) as (1) Season 1 Episode 6: "Earthquake" (1953) as (2) Season 1 Episode 18: "Secret Answer" (1954) as (3) Season 2 Episode 4: "The Lamp" (1954) as (4) Season 3 Episode 14: "A Pattern of Deceit" (1955) as (5)
1954	Cavalcade of America	Captain Joshua Patten	Season 2 Episode 32: "The Skipper's Lady"
1954	The Public Defender	Gil Wells	Season 1 Episode 16: "Youth Crime Ring"
1954	The Lone Wolf	Steber	Season 1 Episode 15: "The Las Vegas Story"
1954–1955	The Lone Ranger	Clay Trowbridge; Regis Bassett	Season 4 Episode 1: "The Fugitive" (1954) as Clay Trowbridge Season 4 Episode 51: "Counterfeit Redskins" (1955) as Regis Bassett
1954–1957	Schlitz Playhouse of Stars	(1) Mal Martin (2) Landry (3) Cochran (4) Pete Hunter (5) Stacey Harris	Season 3 Episode 45: "Rabbit Foot" (1954) as (1) Season 4 Episode 18: "The Cool One" (1955) as (2) Season 4 Episode 37: "Sentence of Death" (1955) as (3) Season 5 Episode 26: "The Waiting House" (1956) as (4) Season 7 Episode 5: "Smarty" (1957) as (5)
1955	The Whistler	Max	Season 1 Episode 19: "Sleep My Pretty One"
1955	Damon Runyon Theater	Barney Reardon	Season 1 Episode 4: "The Lacework Kid"
1955	City Detective	Philip	Season 2 Episode 30: "Case of the Beautiful Miss X"
1955	Treasury Men in Action	Scottie Barrow	Season 5 Episode 35: "The Case of the Perfect Gentleman"
1955	Front Row Center	Douglas Proctor	Season 1 Episode 9: "Guest in the House"
1955	Celebrity Playhouse	Cowie Thomas	Season 1 Episode 3: "Showdown at San Pablo"
1955	Four Star Playhouse	Garry Anchor	Season 4 Episode 3: "Let the Chips Fall"
1955	Frontier	Fred Graham	Season 1 Episode 7: "King of the Dakotas, Part 1"
1955–1956	Lux Video Theatre	Carl / Matthews	Season 5 Episode 45: "Last Year's Snow" (1955) as Carl Season 6 Episode 18: "Witness to Murder" (1956) as Matthews
1955–1959	The Millionaire	John 'Jack' Martin; Dr. Ralph Spencer	Season 1 Episode 16: "The Jack Martin Story" (1955) as John 'Jack' Martin Season 5 Episode 28: "Millionaire Henry Banning" (1959) as Dr. Ralph Spencer
1956	Navy Log	Tim Lansing	Season 1 Episode 36: "Night Landing"
1956	Alfred Hitchcock Presents	Arthur Summers	Season 2 Episode 2: "Fog Closing In"
1956–1958	Matinee Theatre	Paul McLean; Matt	Season 1 Episode 121: "In Dread of Winter" (1956) Season 2 Episode 13: "A Question of Balance" (1956) as Paul McLean Season 2 Episode 112: "Voyage to Mandok" (1957) Season 3 Episode 88: "Cave-In" (1958) as Matt Season 3 Episode 128: "Walk the Sky" (1958) Season 3 Episode 160: "Course for Collision" (1958)
1957	The Gray Ghost	Gabe Travers	Season 1 Episode 11: "The Rescue"
1957	The Restless Gun	Adam Robie	Season 1 Episode 3: "Revenge at Harness Creek"
1957	Telephone Time	Dr. Samuel Rinehart	Season 3 Episode 13: "Novel Appeal"
1957	Code 3	Tim Hayes	Season 1 Episode 38: "Sunset Strip"
1957–1958	Broken Arrow	Colonel Horn	Season 2 Episode 10: "Renegades Return" (1957) Season 2 Episode 18: "Massacre" (1958)
1957–1959	State Trooper	Hal Denton; Charles Medford	Season 1 Episode 12: "The Cash Out" (1957) as Hal Denton Season 3 Episode 2: "The Trap that Jack Built" (1959) as Charles Medford
1958	M Squad	Van Wert	Season 1 Episode 16: "The Cover-Up"
1958	Mike Hammer	Frank Beulah; Lew Fallon	Season 1 Episode 3: "Hot Hands, Cold Dice" as Frank Beulah Season 1 Episode 29: "Four Blind Mice" as Lew Fallon
1958	The Further Adventures of Ellery Queen	Police Lieutenant Peter Maas	Season 1 Episode 6: "Cat of Many Tails"
1958	Lawman	Matt Saint	Season 1 Episode 9: "Bloodline"
1958	Playhouse 90	Paul Newton	Season 3 Episode 10: "Free Weekend"
1958	Steve Canyon	Major Martin	Season 1 Episode 12: "Pilot Error"
1958–1961	Gunsmoke	Major Evans; Killion; Rob Curtin	Season 4 Episode 3: "Gunsmuggler" (1958) as Major Evans Season 5 Episode 15: "Tag, You're It" (1959) as Killion Season 6 Episode 34: "The Imposter" (1961) as Rob Curtin
1958–1962	Wagon Train	Father Martin; Ralph Morse	Season 2 Episode 2: "The Juan Ortega Story" (1958) as Father Martin Season 5 Episode 30: "The Terry Morrell Story" (1962) as Ralph Morse
1958–1962	Perry Mason	(1) Harry Vance (2) Simon Atley (3) & (5) Deputy District Attorney Bertram Telford (4) Prosecutor Green	Season 1 Episode 24: "The Case of the Deadly Double" (1958) as (1) Season 3 Episode 8: "The Case of the Bartered Bikini" (1959) as (2) Season 4 Episode 6: "The Case of the Wandering Widow" (1960) as (3) Season 4 Episode 22: "The Case of the Cowardly Lion" (1961) as (4) Season 5 Episode 27: "The Case of the Counterfeit Crank" (1962) as (5)
1959	The Lineup		Season 5 Episode 16: "The Frederick Freemont Case"
1959	Dick Powell's Zane Grey Theatre	Tom Lamont	Season 3 Episode 20: "Deadfall"
1959	Alcoa Presents: One Step Beyond	Mr. Garrick	Season 1 Episode 8: "Premonition"
1959	The Rough Riders	Rudabaugh	Season 1 Episode 32: "Forty-Five Caliber Law"
1959	Men Into Space	Major Dr. Warnecke	Season 1 Episode 4: "Water Tank Rescue" Season 1 Episode 12: "Christmas on the Moon"
1959–1963	The Twilight Zone	Doctor / George	Season 1 Episode 1: "Where Is Everybody?" (series pilot) (1959) as Doctor Season 4 Episode 16: "On Thursday We Leave for Home" (1963) as George
1960	Tightrope	Lieutenant Harkness	Season 1 Episode 17: "Night of the Gun"
1960	Markham	Lieutenant Gromby	Season 1 Episode 31: "Sing a Song of Murder"
1960	Hawaiian Eye	John O'Neil	Season 1 Episode 19: "Hong Kong Passage"
1960	Tales of Wells Fargo	Frisbee / Leo Summers	Season 4 Episode 30: "Trading Post" as Frisbee Season 5 Episode 11: "Jeff Davis' Treasure" as Leo Summers
1960	Law of the Plainsman	Sergeant Sean McGrath	Season 1 Episode 29: "Cavern of the Wind"
1960	Not for Hire	Saunders	Season 1 Episode 30: "The General's Daughter"
1960	Rawhide	Henry J. Porter	Season 2 Episode 30: "Incident of the Silent Web"
1960	Shotgun Slade	Convict #1	Season 1 Episode 36: "A Flower on Boot Hill"
1960	The Chevy Mystery Show	Dr. Walter Halsey	Season 1 Episode 3: "The Summer Hero"
1960	Bat Masterson	Marshal	Season 3 Episode 1: "Debt of Honor"
1960–1962	The Untouchables	Bob Wheaton; Carleton Edmunds	Season 1 Episode 22: "The White Slavers" as Bob Wheaton Season 4 Episode 11: "The Floyd Gibbons Story" as Carleton Edmunds
1961	National Velvet	Reg Tolland	Season 1 Episode 19: "The Colt"
1961	Laramie	Sheriff	Season 2 Episode 16: "Killer Without Cause"
1961	The Brothers Brannagan	Frankie Lyons	Season 1 Episode 17: "Overexposed"
1961	Lassie	Sergeant Nolan	Season 7 Episode 22: "The Patriot"
1961	Tallahassee 7000	Todd	Season 1 Episode 7: "The Violent Night"
1961	Adventures in Paradise	Dr. Stan Sandholm	Season 2 Episode 21: "Angel of Death"
1961	The Roaring 20's	Lieutenant Michael Carey	Season 1 Episode 20: "War with the Nighthawkers"
1961	Cheyenne	Clairmont Sheriff	Season 6 Episode 4: "The Young Fugitives"
1961	Checkmate	The Architect	Season 2 Episode 9: "The Two of Us"
1961	77 Sunset Strip	Mark Evans	Season 4 Episode 15: "The Chrome Coffin"
1962	Ripcord	Haney	Season 1 Episode 34: "Log Jam"
1962	Bus Stop	Bob Pearson	Season 1 Episode 15: "Summer Lightning"
1962	Alcoa Premiere	Sullivan	Season 1 Episode 26: "A Place to Hide"
1962	The Eleventh Hour	Assistant District Attorney Walter Maylie	Season 1 Episode 7: "Angie, You Made My Heart Stop"
1962	Mister Ed	Frank Gordon	Season 3 Episode 12: "Wilbur the Masher"
1962	The Brighter Day	Walter Dennis	Unknown episode
1963	Leave It To Beaver	Mr. Bob Yeager	Season 6 Episode 18: "More Blessed To Give"
1963	Dr. Kildare	Dr. Tab Lamb	Season 2 Episode 14: "Love is a Sad Song"
1963	The Virginian	Bartlett	Season 1 Episode 18: "Say Goodbye to All That"
The Fugitive	Sheriff	Season 1 Episode 10: "Fatso"	
1964	Kraft Suspense Theatre	Sheriff Johnny Kyle	Season 1 Episode 11: "The Deep End"
1964	The Travels of Jaimie McPheeters	Beaufoy	Season 1 Episode 21: "The Day of the Lame Duck"
1964-1968	Peyton Place	Leslie Harrington	219 episodes
1968	The Outcasts	Gregg Jeremy	Season 1 Episode 3: "Three Ways to Die"
1968	It Takes a Thief	Preston Washburne	Season 2 Episode 11: "Glass Riddle"
1970	The Immortal	Walter Hiller	Season 1 Episode 1: "Sylvia"
1971	Ironside	Judge	Season 4 Episode 24: "Lesson in Terror"
1971	My Three Sons	Father O'Hara	Season 12 Episode 12: "The Sound of Music"
1972	Emergency!	Myron Gilmore	Season 1 Episode 2: "Botulism" (final appearance)
