= Ramar of the Jungle =

American television series

- Genre: Jungle Adventure
- Created by: Jon Hall
- Written by: Sherman L. Lowe; George Sayre; Charles Condon
- Directed by: Lew Landers
- Starring: Jon Hall; Ray Montgomery; Victor Millan; Nick Stewart
- No. of seasons: 2
- No. of episodes: 52

Production
- Executive producer: Rudolph Flothow
- Producer: Leon Fromkess
- Production companies: Arrow Productions, Inc.

Original release
- Network: Syndication
- Release: October 7, 1952 – 1954

Ramar of the Jungle is a 1950s American television series that starred Jon Hall as Dr. Tom Reynolds (the titular "ramar" being the natives' title for a white medicine man). In addition to Jon Hall as Dr. Tom Reynolds (Ramar), the series also starred Ray Montgomery as Reynolds' associate, Professor Howard Ogden. Victor Millan played the role of Zahir and Nick Stewart played Willy-Willy.

Episodes were set in Africa and India. The series aired in syndication, premiering on October 7, 1952, and airing through 1954. Reruns continued "until the end of the 1960s."

== Cast ==
- Jon Hall - Dr. Tom Reynolds ("Ramar")
- Ray Montgomery - Professor Howard Ogden
- Nick Stewart - Willy-Willy
- M'liss McClure - Trudy Van Dyne
- James Fairfax - Charlie, the cockney guide
- Victor Millan - Zahir
- Joel Fluellen - Chaba
- Harry Lauter - Bellows
- Ludwig Stössel - Peter Van Dyne
- Millicent Patrick - the White Goddess
- Emmett Smith - Chief Bolla

Other notable performers who appeared on the show include Woody Strode, Juanita Moore, Phyllis Coates, Archie Savage, Louise Franklin, Bernard Hamilton—aka Bernie Hamilton, making his television debut—and Felix Nelson.

== Production ==
Hall created the series, and starred in it, obviously trying to emulate the then-popular Jungle Jim films. Produced by Rudolph Flothow for Arrow Productions and ITC Entertainment, four sets of 13 episodes were produced, for a total of 52. Each episode runs approximately 25 minutes. In season one, the first 13 episodes are set in Africa and the second 13 are set in India. In the second season, all 26 episodes take place in Africa.

Lew Landers was the director, and Wilbur McGaugh was assistant director. Writers were Sherman L. Lowe, George Sayre, and Charles Condon. When work on the second season ended in Spring 1954, producer Flothow told Hall there would be a hiatus before they would resume work on the series. Incensed at the delay, Hall threatened to move to Australia where he told Flothow he would be starring in a TV series there called Capt. Thunderhead. Although Flothow then agreed to resume production on the third season, Hall relocated to Australia anyway. The Australian series never materialized, and Hall was left completely unemployed. (Years later, Hall committed suicide after learning he had inoperable bladder cancer in 1979.)

Several "Ramar" episodes were later combined and released as feature films by producer Leon Fromkess, some shown theatrically and others created specifically for television.

The program's theme was "Trinidad" by Thomas Peluso.

== Merchandise and promotion ==
Television Programs of America boosted the program's visibility with a variety of promotional materials, including comic books and autographed photographs of Hall. For 25 cents a person could buy a Jungle Adventure Kit, and $1.49 bought a board game that had participants encountering a variety of pitfalls as they attempted to reach the Temple of the Love Goddess. Hall made personal appearances that attracted children, many of whom left with Ramar-related items. In 1979, Hall said, "We made almost as much on the tie-ins as we did off the show."

In November 1954, Macy's opened a $10,000 replica of the set on which the program was filmed.For 25 cents, a child could walk through the set and, in the process, see a variety of Ramar merchandise. The opening ceremony included Hall, Grace Kelly, the mayor, and a chimpanzee.

== Episodes ==
The series' 52 episodes are listed here in alphabetical order. Alpha Video has released 11 Ramar dvds, containing a total of 44 of the 52 episodes. There are eight episodes which have not been released by Alpha.

Key: An asterisk indicates that the episode is not available on dvd

- "Blind Peril"
- "The Blue Treasure"
- "The Bride of the Idol"
- "The Burning Barrier" *
- "Call to Danger"
- "Contraband"
- "The Crocodile God of Kaa"
- "Curse of the Devil Doll"
- "Danger in Disguise"
- "Dark Justice"
- "Dark Venture"
- "The Devil's Soul"
- "The Doomed Safari"
- "Drums of Doom"
- "Drums of the Jungle"
- "Evil Strangers"
- "Evil Trek"
- "The Flaming Mountain"
- "The Flower of Doom" *
- "The Forbidden Village"
- "The Golden Tablet"
- "The Hidden Treasure"
- "Idol Voodoo"
- "Jungle Terror"
- "Jungle Treasure"
- "Jungle Vengeance" *
- "King of the Watus"

- "Lady of the Leopards"
- "The Lost Safari" *
- "Mark of the Bola"
- "The Mark of Shaitan"
- "The Mask of Kreenah" * (part of this episode was incorporated into the 1964 feature film Ramar and the Jungle Voodoo)
- "The Mystic Pawn"
- "Queen of Sidonis" *
- "The Road of No Return"
- "The Sacred Monkey"
- "Savage Challenge"
- "Savage Fury"
- "Striped Fury"
- "Thunder over Sangoland"
- "The Tiger's Claw"
- "Trail to Danger"
- "The Tree of Death" *
- "Tribal Feud"
- "The Unknown Terror"
- "Urn of Destiny"
- "Valley of No Return" *
- "The Voice in the Sky"
- "Voice of the Past"
- "White Man's Magic"
- "White Savages"
- "Zombie Terror"

== Theatrical films ==
Four feature films were made (by combining three formerly unrelated episodes into each film, editing them into a single storyline) which were then theatrically distributed by Lippert Pictures in the United States and Eros Films in the UK:

- White Goddess (1953) featuring Ludwig Stossel and Milicent Patrick
- Eyes of the Jungle (1953) aka Destination Danger; featuring Edgar Barrier and Robert Shayne
- Thunder Over Sangoland (1955) featuring Myron Healy and House Peters Jr.
- Phantom of the Jungle (1955), combines "The Golden Tablet" and "The Flaming Mountain" with a 3rd unidentified episode to tell the story of a young woman scientist searching for her lost archaeologist father; featuring Anne Gwynne and Kenneth MacDonald.

== Television features ==
In addition to the 4 theatrical features, seven additional TV movies were created in 1964 for television release only:

- Ramar and the Burning Barrier (1964, ITC, 82 minutes, b&w)
- Ramar and the Deadly Females (1964, ITC, 80 minutes, b&w)
- Ramar and the Jungle Secrets (1964, ITC, 81 minutes, b&w)
- Ramar's Mission to India (1964, ITC, 80 minutes, b&w)
- Ramar and the Savage Challenges (1964, ITC, 83 minutes, b&w)
- Ramar and the Hidden Terrors (1964, ITC, 83 minutes, b&w)
- Ramar and the Jungle Voodoo (1964, ITC, 78 minutes, b&w) -- this is the only one of the seven available on DVD; it consisted of footage edited from 5 Ramar TV episodes..."The Sacred Monkey", "Contraband", "Danger in Disguise", "The Doomed Safari" and the otherwise unavailable "Mask of Kreenah".

== Popular culture ==
Jimmy Buffett referenced this show in his song "Pencil Thin Mustache" in the verse, "Ramar of the Jungle was everyone's bwana, but only jazz musicians were smoking marijuana."

== See also ==
- Jungle Jim
- Congo Bill
- Bomba the Jungle Boy
