= Western Mail (film) =

1942 film by Robert Emmett Tansey

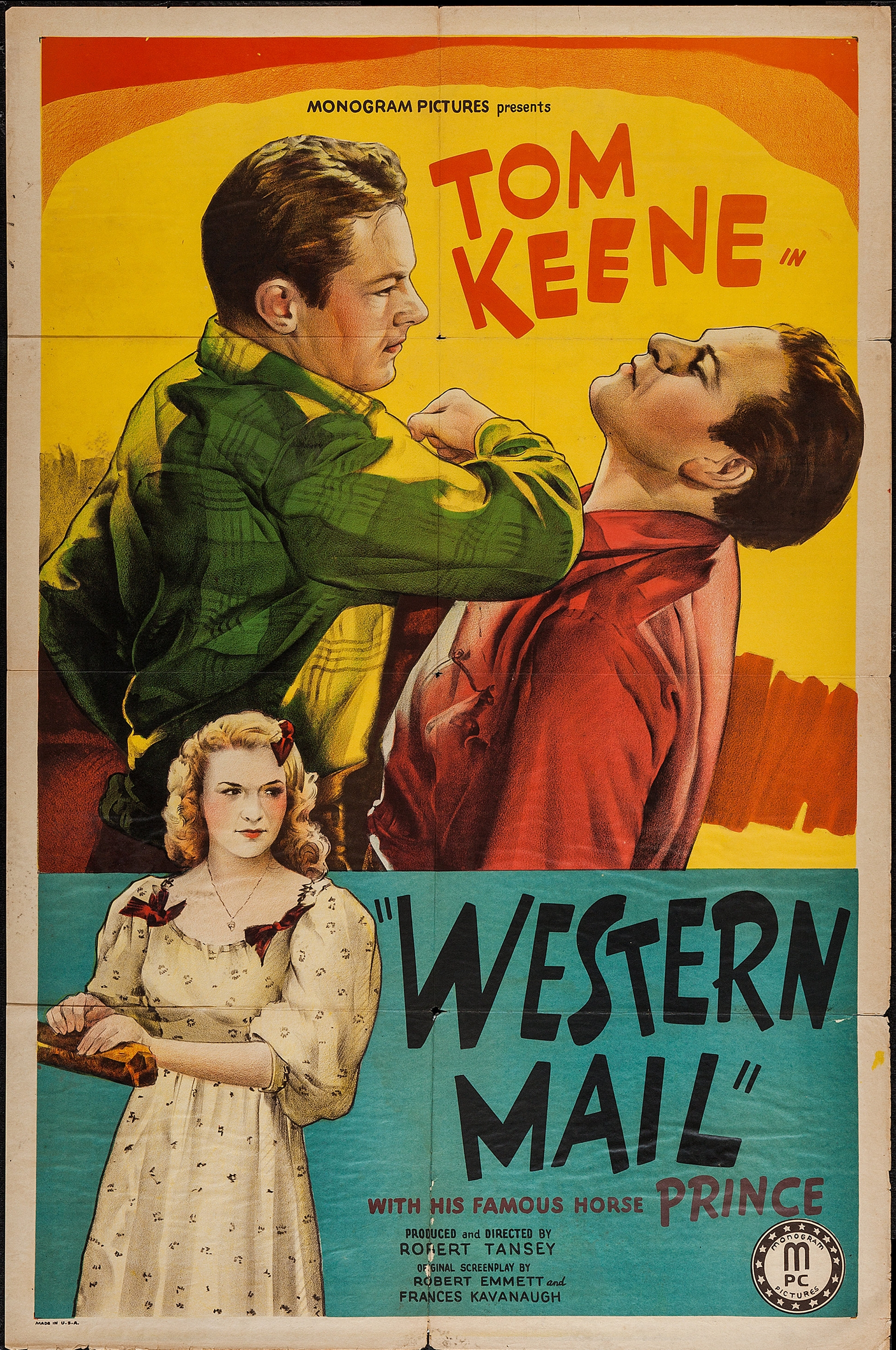
- Theatrical poster
- Directed by: Robert Emmett Tansey
- Written by: Gina Kaus (story); Frances Kavanaugh (writer); Robert Emmett Tansey (writer)
- Produced by: Robert Emmett Tansey
- Starring: Tom Keene; Fred Kohler, Jr.
- Cinematography: Marcel Le Picard
- Edited by: Frederick Bain
- Music by: Frank Sanucci
- Distributed by: Monogram Pictures
- Release date: 13 February 1942
- Running time: 54 minutes
- Country: United States
- Language: English

Western Mail is a 1942 American Western film directed by Robert Emmett Tansey and starring Tom Keene and Fred Kohler, Jr.

== Plot ==
Lucky Webster, a member of the Rivers gang, is uneasy that they have been stealing U.S. mail when robbing trains. Tom Allen is undercover and working with Sheriff Big Bill Collins to capture and arrest the gang. Julia Webster is concerned about her brother. Lopez Mendoza provides some humor as Tom's sidekick.

== Cast ==
- Tom Keene as Tom Allen
- Frank Yaconelli as Lopez Mendoza
- LeRoy Mason as Jeff Gordon
- Jean Trent as Julia Webster
- Fred Kohler, Jr. as Lucky Webster
- Glenn Strange as Sheriff Big Bill Collins
- Gene Alsace as Henchman Rod
- James Sheridan as Henchman Cheyenne
- Karl Hackett as Jim Rivers
