= Father Makes Good =

1950 film directed by Jean Yarbrough

- Theatrical release poster
- Directed by: Jean Yarbrough
- Screenplay by: D.D. Beauchamp
- Based on: Journey at Sunrise by D.D. Beauchamp
- Produced by: Peter Scully
- Starring: Raymond Walburn; Walter Catlett; Gary Gray; Mary Stuart; Barbara Brown; Olin Howland
- Cinematography: William A. Sickner
- Edited by: Carlo Lodato; Peter Scully
- Production company: Mayfair Productions Inc.
- Distributed by: Monogram Pictures
- Release date: May 7, 1950
- Running time: 61 minutes
- Country: United States
- Language: English

Father Makes Good is a 1950 American comedy film directed by Jean Yarbrough and written by D.D. Beauchamp. The film stars Raymond Walburn, Walter Catlett, Gary Gray, Mary Stuart, Barbara Brown and Olin Howland. It was released on May 7, 1950 by Monogram Pictures.

== Cast ==
- Raymond Walburn as Henry Latham
- Walter Catlett as Mayor Colton
- Gary Gray as David Latham
- Mary Stuart as Barbara Latham
- Barbara Brown as Mrs. Latham
- Olin Howland as Milo Williams
- Jack Kirkwood as Homer Smedley
- Brett King as Steve Emory
- Georgie Nokes as Georgie Colton
- Robert Emmett Keane as Seton
- Mary Field as Mrs. Sweeney
- G. Pat Collins as Mr. Joe Sweeney
- Paul E. Burns as Watchman
- Francis Ford as Fisherman
