= Terror at Black Falls =

1962 film

- Film poster
- Directed by: Richard C. Sarafian
- Written by: Richard C. Sarafian
- Produced by: Richard C. Sarafian
- Starring: Peter Mamakos; House Peters Jr.; Gary Gray; Sandra Knight; John A. Alonzo
- Cinematography: Floyd Crosby
- Edited by: Richard C. Sarafian
- Music by: Allyn Ferguson; Earl Horn
- Production company: Meridan Productions
- Distributed by: Beckman Film Corporation
- Release date: May 23, 1962 (US)
- Running time: 70 minutes
- Country: United States
- Language: English

Terror at Black Falls is a 1962 American Western film directed by Richard C. Sarafian.

Sarafian's directing debut, the film was shot in black and white in 1959 in Scotland, Arkansas and released in 1962.

The plot involves a Mexican gunman who seeks vengeance after a mob lynches his son for a horse theft he did not commit. He takes hostages in the town's saloon before being confronted by the sheriff. The film was criticized for its slow pace and was not successful at the box office.

== Cast ==
Actor	Role
Peter Mamakos	Juan Avila
House Peters Jr.	Sheriff Cal
Gary Gray	Johnny
Sandra Knight	Sally Kemper
John A. Alonzo	Carlos Avila
