= Henry, the Rainmaker =

- Theatrical release poster
- Directed by: Jean Yarbrough
- Screenplay by: Lane Beauchamp
- Based on: The Rainmaker by D.D. Beauchamp
- Produced by: Peter Scully
- Starring: Raymond Walburn; Walter Catlett; William Tracy; Mary Stuart; Barbara Brown; Gary Gray
- Cinematography: William A. Sickner
- Edited by: Peter Scully
- Production company: Mayfair Productions Inc.
- Distributed by: Monogram Pictures
- Release date: February 13, 1949
- Running time: 64 minutes
- Country: United States
- Language: English

Henry, the Rainmaker is a 1949 American comedy film directed by Jean Yarbrough and written by Lane Beauchamp. The film stars Raymond Walburn, Walter Catlett, William Tracy, Mary Stuart, Barbara Brown and Gary Gray. The film was released on February 13, 1949, by Monogram Pictures.

== Plot ==
Henry Latham is an average man who is inspired to run for mayor office because of the painful problem of garbage disposal. George Colton, an incumbent mayor, solves the problem by himself, so later Latham turns his attention to another problem—the water shortage. His stubbeorn attempts to become a rainmaker for the town prove to be disastrous.

== Cast ==
- Raymond Walburn as Henry Latham
- Walter Catlett as Mayor George Colton
- William Tracy as Charlie Richards
- Mary Stuart as Barbara Latham
- Barbara Brown as Mrs. Edna Latham
- Gary Gray as David Latham
- Addison Richards as Steve Richards
- Lois Austin as Mrs. Richards
- Georgie Nokes as Georgie Colton
- Mary Field as Mrs. Sweeney
- Robert Emmett Keane as Seton
- Ruth Lee as Schoolteacher
- Melinda Byron as Marilyn Loper
- Edna Holland as Mrs. Parker
- Earle Hodgins as Mr. Peabody
- Barton Yarborough as Reverend Bascom
- Leonard Bremen as Bum
