= Gary Gray (actor) =

American actor

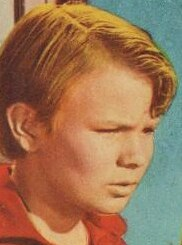
- Gray in The Painted Hills (1951)
- Born: Gary Dickson Gray; December 18, 1936; Los Angeles, California, U.S.
- Died: April 4, 2006 (aged 69); Brush Prairie, Washington, U.S.
- Resting place: Forest Lawn Memorial Park, Glendale
- Occupation: Actor

Gary Dickson Gray (December 18, 1936 – April 4, 2006) was an American child actor in films, and as an adult in television.

== Biography ==
Born in Los Angeles, California, Gray was the son of Jeanie Ellen Dickson and John William Gray, a.k.a. Bill Gray, a film business manager. On January 28, 1961, he married Jean Charlene Bean. The couple had four daughters and 19 grandchildren.

=== Acting career ===
It was two clients of his father's, Bert Wheeler and Jack Benny, who suggested that Gray should be used in films. Gray made his film debut in the Joan Crawford film A Woman's Face in 1941, and played minor roles in such popular films as Heaven Can Wait (1943), Gaslight (1944) and Meet Me in St. Louis (1944). In the 1944 short feature I Am an American he played Thomas Jefferson Kanowski, son of fictional Polish immigrant Fydor Kanowski. He played more substantial roles in films such as Return of the Bad Men (1948) with Randolph Scott, Gun Smugglers (1948) with Tim Holt, Rachel and the Stranger (also 1948) with Robert Mitchum, The Next Voice You Hear (1950) with Nancy Reagan and James Whitmore, and Wild Heritage (1958) with Maureen O'Sullivan.

On April 17, 1956, Gray was cast as sixteen-year-old Jackie Jensen, later a Major League Baseball player, in "The Jackie Jensen Story", which aired on the NBC anthology series, Cavalcade of America. Jensen played himself as an adult; Vivi Janiss was cast as Jensen's mother.

By the time he graduated from high school Gray had appeared in more than 70 films, however as an adult his acting roles were fairly few, and were mainly for television. By the early 1960s, he had retired from acting and concentrated on raising his family.

=== Business career and later life ===
In 1960, Gray started a swimming pool maintenance and repair business. For the last 25 years of his 38 years in the swimming pool industry, Gray worked for two of the major international manufacturers of swimming pool equipment as territory, regional, and national sales manager. Gray was a sought-after speaker and educator for the "National Spa and Pool Institute" as well as by the "Independent Pool and Spa Service Association". Gray retired from the swimming pool industry in July, 1999.

Gray collected tapes of his movies and television programs, as well as stills, posters, and lobby cards from his acting career. Beginning in the mid-90s, he was a frequent guest at film festivals throughout the United States. He enjoyed visiting with his fans, and relating many interesting stories from his lengthy career. Gray played golf as a hobby.

== Personal life ==
Gary Gray was married to Jean Charlene Bean and had 4 children.

== Death ==
Gary Gray died on April 4, 2006, in Brush Prairie, Washington from cancer, aged 69.

== Filmography ==
Year	Title	Role	Notes
1941	A Woman's Face	Sailor-Suited Boy in Park	Film debut, Uncredited
1941	Sun Valley Serenade	Charles - Adopted Refugee Boy	Uncredited
1943	The Meanest Man in the World	Second Boy With Candy	Uncredited
1943	It's a Great Life	Boy at Circus Show	Uncredited
1943	Hitler's Madman	Little Boy	Uncredited
1943	Two Tickets to London	Boy Pushing Swing	Uncredited
1943	Alaska Highway	Boy	Uncredited
1943	Heaven Can Wait	Boy in Park	Uncredited
1943	Where Are Your Children?	Boy in Day Care Nursery	Uncredited
1944	Beautiful But Broke	Boy in Nursery	Uncredited
1944	Address Unknown	Hugo Schulz	
1944	Gaslight	Boy in Park with Nanny	Uncredited
1944	Once Upon a Time	Boy with Shoebox	Uncredited
1944	The White Cliffs of Dover	Boy at Dinner Table	Uncredited
1944	Meet Me in St. Louis	Boy at Pavilion	Uncredited
1944	I'll Be Seeing You	Franklin - Boy with Toy Machine Gun	Uncredited
1945	Youth for the Kingdom	Boy	
1945	The Clock	Little Joe, Boy in Park	Uncredited
1945	Adventures of Rusty	Herbie	Uncredited
1945	Men in Her Diary	Boy Outside Flower Shop	Uncredited
1946	To Each His Own	Casey Ingham	Uncredited
1946	The Green Years	Boy Making First Communion	Uncredited
1946	Rendezvous 24	'Hansel' in Radio Show	Voice, Uncredited
1946	Little Mister Jim	Neighbor Boy	Uncredited
1946	Slightly Scandalous	Little Boy	Uncredited
1946	Three Little Girls in Blue	Farm Boy with Jug	Uncredited
1946	Three Wise Fools	Willie the Squeak	Uncredited
1946	The Wonderful Ears of Johnny McGoggin	Johnny McGoggin	
1946	Gay Bubbles	Jimmie	
1947	My Brother Talks to Horses	Boy at School	Uncredited
1947	Backlash	Chris	Uncredited
1947	Too Many Winners	Jimmy Edwards	Uncredited
1947	The Millerson Case	Second Boy at School	Uncredited
1947	Living in a Big Way	Boy at 'Broken Arms'	Uncredited
1947	High Conquest	Boy on Train	Uncredited
1947	Dark Delusion	Boy Patient	Uncredited
1947	Swing the Western Way	Boy in Grandstand at Rodeo	Uncredited
1947	Heaven Only Knows	Jimmie	Uncredited
1948	Tenth Avenue Angel	Boy	Uncredited
1948	Best Man Wins	Bob Smiley	
1948	Return of the Bad Men	Johnny	
1948	Fighting Back	Jimmy Sanders	
1948	Night Wind	Johnny Benson	
1948	Rachel and the Stranger	Davey	
1948	Whispering Smith	Bobby, Baggs' Grandson	Uncredited
1948	Gun Smugglers	Danny Reeves	
1949	Henry, the Rainmaker	David Latham	
1949	Streets of San Francisco	Frankie Fraser	
1949	Leave It to Henry	David Latham	
1949	The Girl from Jones Beach	Woody Wilson	
1949	Masked Raiders	Artie Trevett	
1949	The Great Lover	Tommy O'Connor	
1950	Father Is a Bachelor	Jan Chalotte	
1950	Father Makes Good	David Latham	
1950	The Next Voice You Hear...	Johnny Smith	
1950	Two Weeks with Love	McCormick Robinson	
1950	Father's Wild Game	David Latham	
1951	The Painted Hills	Tommy Blake	
1951	Father Takes the Air	David Latham	
1951-1952	Fireside Theatre	Johnny	Episode: "The Secret"
1951-1958	Family Theater	Undetermined Roles	3 episodes
1952	Rodeo	Joey Cartwright	
1953	You Are There	Young Rebel	Episode: "The Boston Tea Party"
1953	Crazylegs	Teenager on Phone	
1954	Annie Oakley	Bucky Donavan	Episode: "Annie and the Six o' Spades"
1954	Captain Midnight	Jimmy Sawyer	Episode: "Deadly Diamonds"
1955	Cavalcade of America	Apple Knocker	Episode: "The Texas Rangers"
1955	The First Hundred Days	Gary	
1956	Studio 57	Mikey	Episode: "The Baxter Boy"
1956	The Lineup	Bell Boy	Episode: "The Ringing Bells Case"
1956	Teenage Rebel	Freddie Green	Uncredited
1956	Emergency Hospital	Earl Fanmorn	Uncredited
1956	The Danny Thomas Show	Bob	Episode: "Terry at the Crossroads"
1956	Hey, Jeannie!	Undetermined Role	Episode: "Jeannie the Caddy"
1956	The Adventures of Jim Bowie	Paul Wilkins	2 episodes
1956	December Bride	Undetermined Role	Episode: "Football Hero"
1957	I Love Lucy	Fruit Basket Deliveryman	Episode: "Lucy Misses the Mertzes"
1957	Man Without a Gun	Undetermined Role	Episode: "The Fugitive"
1957-1960	The Life and Legend of Wyatt Earp	The Kid/Billy Clanton	3 episodes
1958	Wild Heritage	Hugh Adam David Breslin	
1958	The Party Crashers	Don Hartlow	
1958	26 Men	Shagg Tanner	Episode: "My Brother's Keeper"
1959	Trackdown	Luke Turley	Episode: "The Feud"
1959	Tumbleweed: Baron of Purgatory	Johnny Benson	Episode: "Baron of Purgatory"
1962	Terror at Black Falls	Johnny	Final film

== Bibliography ==
- Goldrup, Tom and Jim (2002). Growing Up on the Set: Interviews with 39 Former Child Actors of Film and Television. McFarland & Co. pp. 103–112. ISBN 1476613702.
- Holmstrom, John (1996). The Moving Picture Boy: An International Encyclopaedia from 1895 to 1995. Norwich: Michael Russell, p. 199-200.
