= High Conquest =

1947 US film directed by Irving Allen

- Directed by: Irving Allen
- Screenplay by: Max Trell
- Story by: Aben Kandel
- Based on: High Conquest: The Story of Mountaineering by James Ramsey Ullman
- Produced by: Irving Allen
- Starring: Anna Lee; Gilbert Roland; Warren Douglas
- Cinematography: Jack Greenhalgh
- Edited by: Charles Craft
- Music by: René Garriguenc; Lucien Moraweck; Lyn Murray
- Production company: Irving Allen Productions
- Distributed by: Monogram Pictures
- Release date: June 21, 1947
- Running time: 79 minutes
- Country: United States
- Language: English

High Conquest is a 1947 American drama film directed by Irving Allen and starring Anna Lee, Gilbert Roland, and Warren Douglas. It was adapted from the 1941 book of the same title by James Ramsey Ullman. It was distributed by Monogram Pictures.

== Plot ==
In 1932 at the Alpine Club in London, Colonel Hugh Banning recounts a fatal expedition to the Matterhorn in Switzerland thirty years before in which a local guide fell and brought down an American climber, both tumbling to their deaths. Geoffrey Stevens, a chemist and the son of the American who fell, is heading to visit his father's grave, but rejects any suggestion that he should climb the mountain. He meets an attractive pianist Marie who is returning home and the two hit it off. This provokes jealousy from Hugo, the son of the guide who had died with Geoffrey's father decades before. Eventually Geoffrey is goaded into overcoming his fear of the mountain and taking part in a climb with Hugo, who tries to murder him at the summit.

== Cast ==
- Anna Lee as Marie Correl
- Gilbert Roland as Hugo Lanier
- Warren Douglas as Geoffrey Stevens
- Beulah Bondi as Clara Kingsley
- C. Aubrey Smith as Col. Hugh Bunning
- John Qualen as Peter Oberwalder Sr.
- Helene Thimig as Frau Oberwalder
- Alan Napier as Tommy Donlin
- Eric Feldary as Jules Koerber
- Mickey Kuhn as Peter Oberwalder Jr.
- Louis Mercier as Franz
- John Good as Joel Hazlitt
- John Vosper as Mr. Stefani
- Wilton Graff as Mr. Douglaston
- Ferike Boros as Grandmother on Train
- Maurice Cass as Tony - the Waiter
- Fritz Leiber as Priest
- Eddie Parks as Steward
- Mary Field as Miss Woodley
- John Bleifer as Traveler
- Douglas Walton as Hugo Bunning as a Young man
- Regina Wallace as Miss Spencer

== Production ==
The film was financed by Monogram.

Allen shot on location in Switzerland. He shot so much footage that he turned it into a documentary, Climbing the Matterhorn, which won an Oscar. He used color film from Ansco on the understanding that if the results were unsatisfactory the company could have the film back. However, the results were so good Ansco did a deal with Allen for him to use three films in color.
