= Barbara Brown (actress) =

American actress (1901–1975)

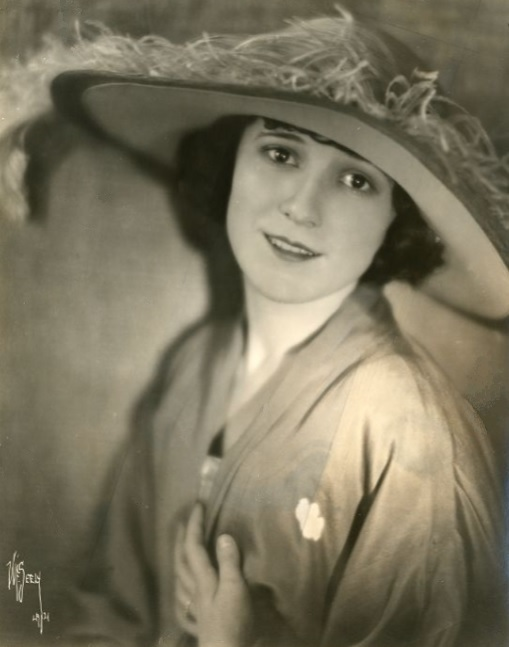
- Brown in 1922
- Born: Barbara Ann Brown; October 18, 1901; Los Angeles, California, U.S.
- Died: July 7, 1975 (aged 73); Los Angeles, California, U.S.
- Resting place: Forest Lawn Memorial Park, Hollywood Hills
- Occupation: Actress
- Years active: 1931–1970
- Spouse(s): Forrest Taylor, Jr. (married 1939–1968; his death)

Barbara Ann Brown (October 18, 1901 – July 7, 1975) was an American actress.

== Early life ==
Barbara Brown was born in 1901 in Los Angeles, California, to Selma C. (née Teutschmann) and Edward Brown. Her mother was the daughter of German immigrants.

== Career ==
Brown began acting on the stage in California. In 1922, she had leading roles in Oliver Morosco's productions Wait Till We're Married and Abie's Irish Rose. She went on to act in Broadway plays such as Relations (1928), Mother Lode (1934), Play, Genius, Play! (1935), Behind Red Lights (1937), Sun Kissed (1937), Our Town (1938), and Liberty Jones (1941).

Brown began appearing in films in the early 1940s. She played Mrs. Delfina Acuña, the mother of Rita Hayworth's character, in You Were Never Lovelier (1942), starring Fred Astaire and Hayworth. In 1944, she was cast in Janie and Hollywood Canteen. She and Ray Collins played Ma and Pa Kettle's in-laws in the comedies Ma and Pa Kettle Back on the Farm (1951) and Ma and Pa Kettle on Vacation (1953). She had a supporting role in the Abbott and Costello comedy Jack and the Beanstalk (1952).

== Personal life and death ==
She married Forrest Taylor Jr., son of actor Forrest Taylor, in 1939 in New York City. Taylor died in 1968. Brown died on July 7, 1975, in Los Angeles, aged 73, from undisclosed causes. Both were interred at Forest Lawn Memorial Park, Hollywood Hills.
