= Karin Booth filmography =

This is the complete filmography of actress Karin Booth (June 19, 1916 – July 27, 2003). Originally from Minneapolis, Minnesota, she entered films in 1941 and retired in 1964. She often appeared in westerns, musicals, and, occasionally, dramas.

== Filmography ==
Year	Title	Role	Notes
1941	Hold Back the Dawn	Girl at Desk	Uncredited
1941	Glamour Boy	Helen Trent	(as Katharine Booth)
1941	Louisiana Purchase	Louisiana Belle	(as Katharine Booth)
1942	The Fleet's In	Hostess	Uncredited
1942	Take a Letter, Darling	Blonde Stenographer	Uncredited
1942	This Gun for Hire	Waitress	Uncredited
1942	Beyond the Blue Horizon	Girl at Circus	Uncredited
1942	Priorities on Parade	Chorine	Uncredited
1942	Holiday Inn	Hat Check Girl	Uncredited
1942	The Forest Rangers	Cowgirl in Hotel Lobby	Uncredited
1942	My Heart Belongs to Daddy	Co-ed	Uncredited
1942	Star Spangled Rhythm	Kate	Uncredited
1943	Dr. Gillespie's Criminal Case	Cashier	Uncredited
1943	Swing Shift Maisie	Louise	(as Katharine Booth)
1943	Swing Fever	Girl	Uncredited
1943	Girl Crazy	Showgirl	Uncredited
1944	Two Girls and a Sailor	Dream Girl	Uncredited
1944	Meet the People	Show Girl	Uncredited
1944	Bathing Beauty	Co-Ed	Uncredited
1944	Maisie Goes to Reno	Girl at Party	Uncredited
1944	Marriage Is a Private Affair	Girl with Miles	Uncredited
1944	Lost in a Harem	Beautiful Girl	Uncredited
1944	Thirty Seconds Over Tokyo	Girl in Officers' Club	Uncredited
1945	Dangerous Partners	Miss Day, Caighn's receptionist	Voice, Uncredited
1945	Wonder Man	Goldwyn Girl	Uncredited
1945	Ziegfeld Follies	Ziegfeld Girl	Uncredited
1945	Bud Abbott and Lou Costello in Hollywood	Louise	Uncredited
1945	The Sailor Takes a Wife	Pretty Woman	Uncredited
1946	Up Goes Maisie	Lois	Uncredited
1946	The Hoodlum Saint	Bride	Uncredited
1946	Easy to Wed	Clerk	Uncredited
1946	No Leave, No Love	WAC	Uncredited
1946	Till the Clouds Roll By	Reclining Show Girl 'Old Man River' Finale	Uncredited
1947	The Unfinished Dance	La Darina	
1948	Big City	Florence Bartlett	
1949	My Foolish Heart	Miriam Ball	
1950	State Penitentiary	Shirley Manners	
1950	The Cariboo Trail	Francie Harris	
1950	Last of the Buccaneers	Belle Summer	
1952	Racket Squad		Episode: "The Case of the Cold Neck"
1952	Cripple Creek	Julie Hanson	
1953	Let's Do It Again	Deborah Randolph	
1953	Your Favorite Story		Episode: "The Lost Duchess"
1954	Charge of the Lancers	Maria Sand	
1954	Jungle Man-Eaters	Dr. Bonnie Crandall	
1954	Tobor the Great	Janice Roberts	
1954	Passport to Danger	Jenny	Episode: "Geneva", (as Karen Booth)
1955	African Manhunt	Ann Davis	
1955	Seminole Uprising	Susan Hannah	
1955	Stage 7	Stella Williams	Episode: "Verdict"
1955	Schlitz Playhouse: A Mule for Santa Fe	Mrs. Stuart	
1955	Top Gun	Laura Mead	(as Karen Booth)
1956	Casablanca	Sylvia	Episode: "Fateful Night"
1956	The Ford Television Theatre	Faye Kittridge	Episode: "The Alibi"
1957	The Crooked Sky	Sandra Hastings	
1957	Alfred Hitchcock Presents	Sheila Raymond	Season 3 Episode 8: "Last Request"
1957	The Gray Ghost	Sarah	Episode: "Resurrection"
1958	The World Was His Jury	Polly Barrett	
1958	M Squad	Helen Endicott	Episode: "Shot in the Dark"
1958	Perry Mason	Susan Marshall	Episode: "The Case of the Screaming Woman"
1958	Badman's Country	Lorna Pardee	
1959	The Lineup		Episode: "The Pigeon Drop Case"
1959	Juke Box Rhythm	Leslie Anders	
1959	Beloved Infidel	Janet Pierce	
1964	This Is the Life	Marge Dickenson	Episode: "Test of Love", (final appearance)
