= Eliscu =

Eliscu is a surname. Notable people with the surname include:

- Edward Eliscu (1902–1998), American lyricist, playwright, producer, and actor
- Fernanda Eliscu (1880–1968), Romanian-born American actress
- Frank Eliscu (1912–1996), American sculptor and art teacher
- Jenny Eliscu, American music journalist and radio host
