= Karin Booth =

American actress (1916–2003)

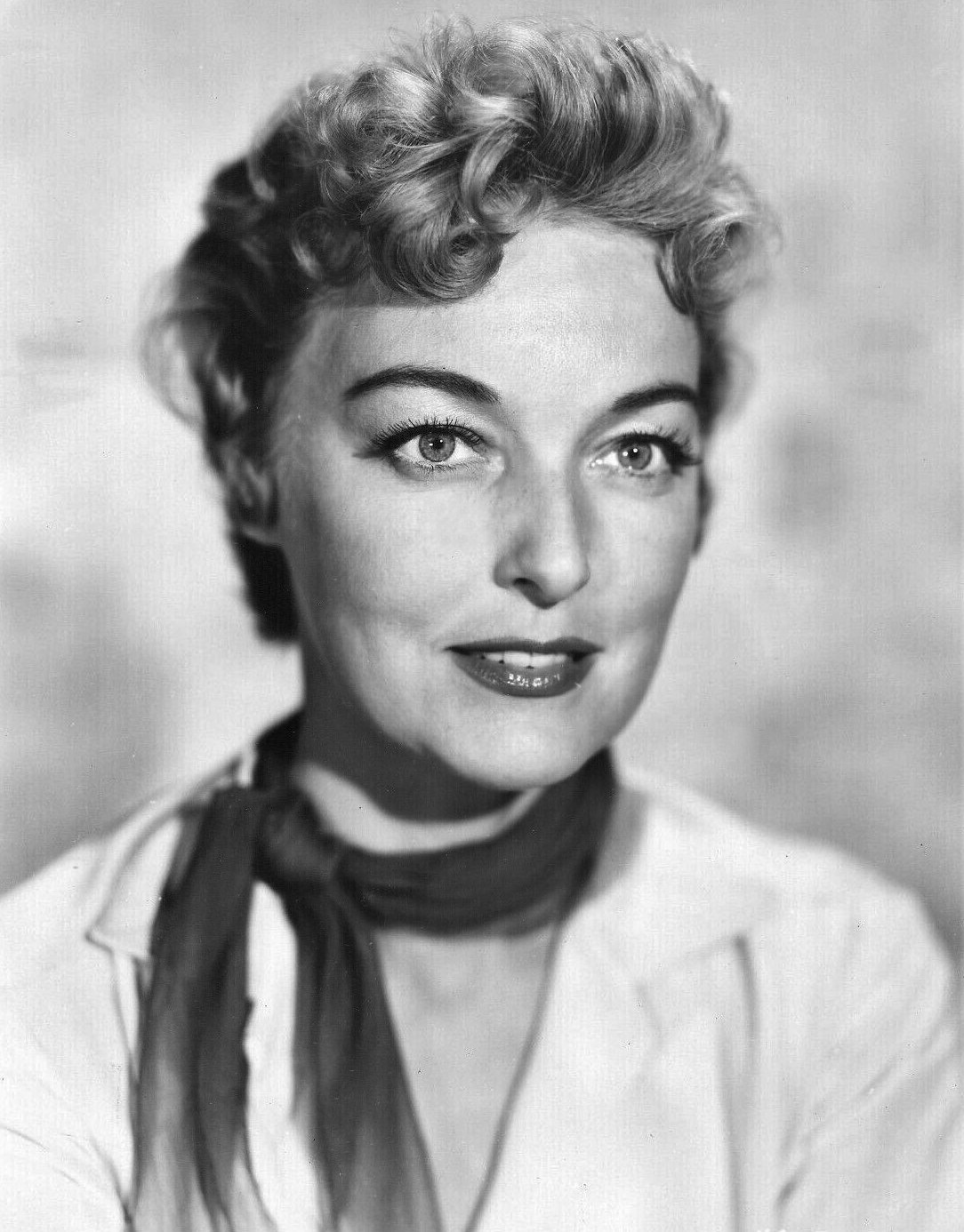
- Born: June Francis Hoffman; June 19, 1916; Minneapolis, Minnesota, U.S.
- Died: July 27, 2003 (aged 87); Jupiter, Florida, U.S.
- Occupation: Actress
- Years active: 1939–1964
- Spouse: Allan Pinkerton Carlisle (1948–2003) (2 sons) (her death)
- Children: 2

Karin Booth (born June Francis Hoffman, June 19, 1916 – July 27, 2003) was an American film and TV actress of the 1940s to 1960s.

== Life and career ==
She was born June Francis Hoffman on June 19, 1916, in Minneapolis, Minnesota to Francis T. and Ebba V. Hoffman. She lived in Portland and Los Angeles, attending John Marshall High School. She began her career modeling and being a chorus girl in 1939 and was signed under contract to Paramount Pictures in 1941 under the name Katharine Booth. Booth was Jewish and, along with Noreen Nash, was a frequent visitor to the Jewish Home for the Aged in Boyle Heights, California.

After changing her screen name to Karin Booth in 1942, she would go on to appear in such feature films as The Unfinished Dance (1947), Big City (1948), The Cariboo Trail (1950), Tobor the Great (1955) and The World Was His Jury (1958). She also appeared on television in Alfred Hitchcock Presents, Perry Mason, M Squad, The Lineup, and This Is The Life. She was considered a Joan Crawford look-alike at the start of her career and was often seen courting with Sterling Hayden, John Hodiak, and Mickey Rooney.

In 1948, she married Allan Pinkerton Carlisle, a well-known and prominent sportsman from Palm Beach, Florida, and had 2 sons, Allan (born November 3, 1950) and Robert (born May 3, 1961). She was expecting a middle child in 1959 but lost the baby unexpectedly while filming Beloved Infidel. She retired in 1964 and lived the rest of her days in the community of Jupiter, Florida, where she died on July 27, 2003 and was cremated with her ashes scattered at sea.

== Filmography ==
- Glamour Boy (1941) – Helen Trent
- Louisiana Purchase (1942) – Louisiana Belle
- The Unfinished Dance (1947) – La Darina
- Big City (1948) – Florence Bartlett
- My Foolish Heart (1950) – Miriam Ball
- State Penitentiary (1950) – Shirley Manners
- The Cariboo Trail (1950) – Francis Harris
- Last of the Buccaneers (1950) – Belle Summer
- Cripple Creek (1952) – Julie Hanson
- Let's Do It Again (1953) – Deborah Randolph
- Charge of the Lancers (1954) – Maria Sand
- Jungle Man-Eaters (1954) – Dr. Bonnie Crandall
- Tobor the Great (1954) – Janice Roberts
- African Manhunt (1955) – Ann Davis
- Seminole Uprising (1955) – Susan Hannah
- Top Gun (1955) – Laura Mead
- The Crooked Sky (1957) – Sandra Hastings
- Alfred Hitchcock Presents (1957) (Season 3 Episode 8: "Last Request") – Sheila Raymond
- The World Was His Jury (1958) – Polly Barrett
- Badman's Country (1958) – Lorna Pardee
- Juke Box Rhythm (1959) – Leslie Anders
- Beloved Infidel (1959) – Janet Pierce
