= The Strange Door =

1951 film by Joseph Pevney

- The theatrical release poster
- Directed by: Joseph Pevney
- Screenplay by: Jerry Sackheim
- Based on: "The Sire De Malétroits Door" by Robert Louis Stevenson
- Produced by: Ted Richmond
- Starring: Charles Laughton; Boris Karloff; Sally Forrest; Alan Napier; Michael Pate; Richard Stapley
- Cinematography: Irving Glassberg
- Edited by: Edward Curtiss
- Color process: Black and white
- Production company: Universal-International Pictures
- Distributed by: Universal Pictures
- Release date: December 14, 1951 (Los Angeles)
- Running time: 81 minutes
- Country: United States
- Language: English

The Strange Door (also known as Robert Louis Stevenson's The Strange Door) is a 1951 American Universal Pictures horror film directed by Joseph Pevney and starring Charles Laughton, Boris Karloff, Sally Forrest and Richard Stapley. The screenplay is based on the short story "The Sire de Maletroit's Door" by Robert Louis Stevenson.

== Plot ==
Sire Alain de Maletroit plots revenge on his younger brother Edmond for stealing Alain's childhood sweetheart, who died giving birth to Edmond's daughter Blanche. Alain secretly imprisons Edmond in his dungeon for 20 years and convinces Blanche that her father is dead.

Alain intends to further debase Blanche as revenge against Edmond. Alain tricks high-born drunken cad Denis de Beaulieu into believing he has murdered a man. Denis escapes a mob by entering the Maletroit chateau by an exterior door that has no latch on the inside. Alain holds Denis captive, intending to force the delicate Blanche into marriage with him.

Alain goes to the dungeon to torture Edmond with the news that Blanche will be married to Denis, an unworthy rogue. After Alain leaves, Edmond asks the family servant Voltan to kill Denis before the wedding. However, Denis shows unanticipated redemptive qualities and he and Blanche fall in love. When Voltan comes to kill Denis, Blanche pleads with Voltan to spare his life and help him escape.

At the wedding, Denis meets an old acquaintance from France, Count Grassin, who agrees to help the newlyweds escape. But when they enter the carriage, it contains the count's dead body, as he has been murdered by Talon. In a fight in a cemetery, the newlyweds are captured and returned to the castle. Voltan is shot, wounded and left to die, but he kills two henchmen.

Their attempts to escape are foiled by Alain, who then seals Edmond, Blanche and Denis in a stone cell and starts a waterwheel that presses the cell walls inward to crush them to death. Voltan fights Alain, wrests the key to the dungeon and pushes Alain into the waterwheel, temporarily stopping the crushing walls. Wounded by the guards, Voltan struggles to the dungeon and, with his dying breath, gives the key to Denis just as the walls start moving again. Denis, Blanche and her father escape the cell. Denis and Blanche decide to stay together and Edmond has the strange door removed from the chateau.

== Cast ==
- Charles Laughton as Alain de Maletroit
- Boris Karloff as Voltan
- Sally Forrest as Blanche de Maletroit
- Richard Stapley as Denis de Beaulieu
- William Cottrell as Corbeau
- Alan Napier as Count Grassin
- Morgan Farley as Renville
- Paul Cavanagh as Edmond de Maletroit
- Michael Pate as Talon

== Production ==
The film, described as Universal's reentry into the horror genre, was initially announced as The Door, a title that remained during production. The film is based on "The Sire De Malétroits Door" by Robert Louis Stevenson, a short story initially published in Temple Bar magazine in 1878. Film historian Tom Weaver described screenwriter Jerry Sackheim's adaptation of the story as including various Gothic archetypes such as peepholes in the walls, ghostly wailings in the night and a torture chamber, concluding that the film is "a well-disguised remake of Universal's The Raven (1935)."

Director Joseph Pevney later stated to Weaver that he did not know why he directed The Strange Door, stating: "I was a new director and I was assigned movies in those days and they told me, 'This is what you're gonna do.' I'd do three or four pictures a year, when I started. But as I stayed with the studio and people got to know me ... I was able to turn things down."

Charles Laughton was paid $25,000 for his role in the film. Sally Forrest, who plays Blanche de Maletroit, was on loan from MGM. Robert Douglas, who had played numerous villains in Universal films, was first considered for the role of Corbeau.

The Strange Door was scheduled for 18 days of production. Filming began on May 15, 1951 and ended on June 5.

== Release ==
Before its general release, The Strange Door was screened for a preview audience at the United Artists Theatre in Los Angeles and received a strongly positive response. Prerelease screenings were also held at Shea's theaters in Mississippi and Jamestown, New York.

== Reception ==
In a contemporary review for the Los Angeles Times, critic John L. Scott of the Los Angeles Times called the film "a real legitimate terror film" and wrote: "Those theatergoers who like a morbid atmosphere complete with castle equipped with sliding panels, a torture chamber and other jolly little items will enjoy themselves. Having sat through nonhorror movies that were little terrors themselves, I rather enjoyed this out-and-out shiver opus."

== Adaptation ==
On May 7, 1951, the story was presented as an installment titled "The Sire de Maletroit's Door" of the anthology series Lux Video Theatre. The adaptation starred Frederick Worlock as Sire de Maletroit, Richard Greene as Denis de Beaulieu, Coleen Gray as Blanche de Maletroit, Joel Ashley as Captain Philip de Chartier and John Cassavetes as the First Guard.

== Home video ==
The Strange Door, along with Night Key, Tower of London, The Climax and The Black Castle, was released on DVD in 2006 by Universal Studios as part of The Boris Karloff Collection. In 2019, Kino Lorber's Blu-ray release featured an audio commentary by Tom Weaver, Robert J. Kiss and David Schecter.
