= Renegades (1930 film) =

1930 film by Victor Fleming

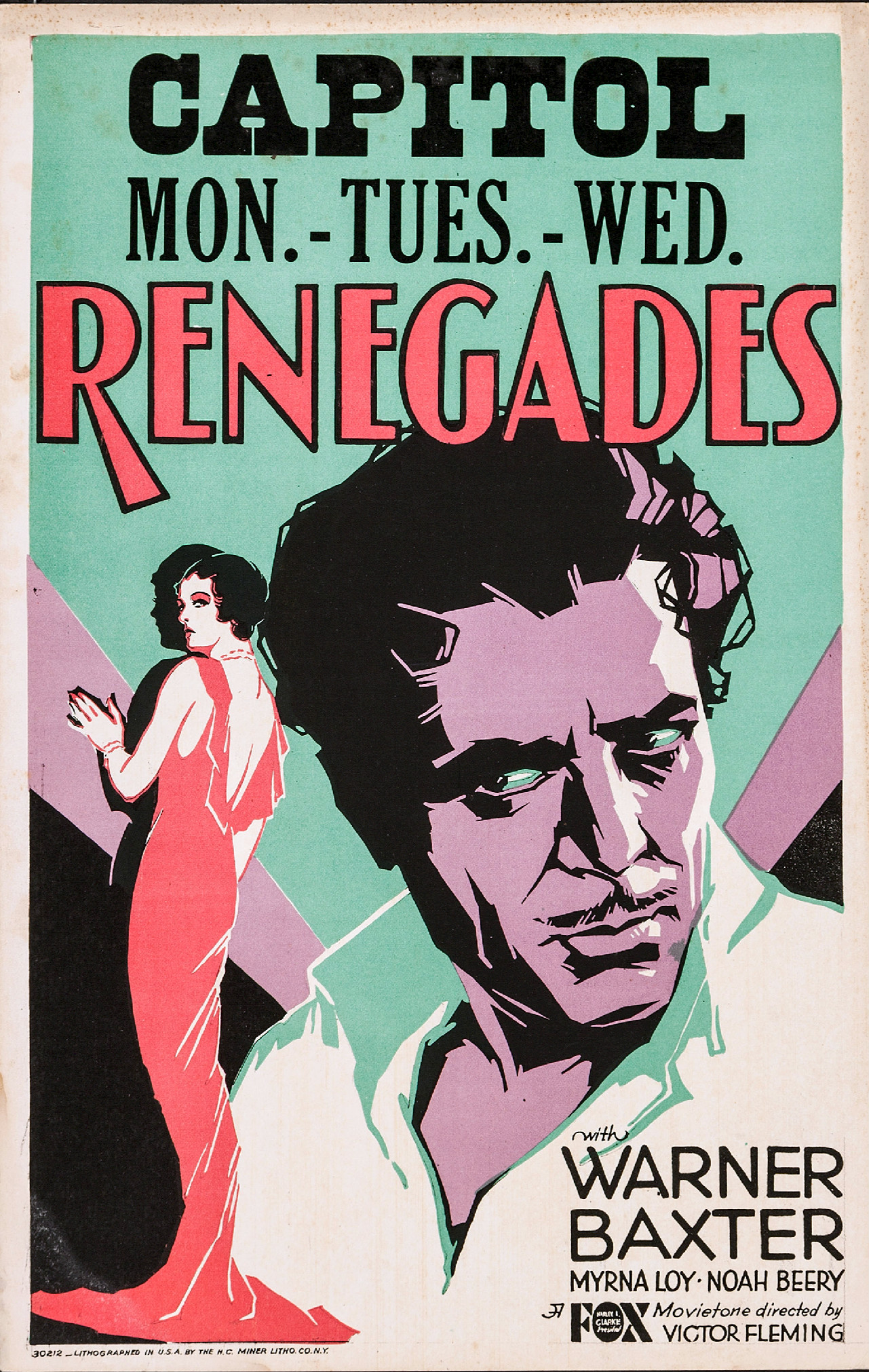
- Directed by: Victor Fleming
- Written by: André Armandy (novel); Jules Furthman
- Produced by: William Fox
- Starring: Warner Baxter; Myrna Loy; Noah Beery; Bela Lugosi; Victor Jory
- Cinematography: Lewis William O'Connell
- Edited by: Harold D. Schuster
- Music by: Cliff Friend; James V. Monaco
- Distributed by: Fox Film Corporation
- Release date: October 26, 1930
- Running time: 84 min.
- Country: United States
- Language: English

Renegades is a 1930 American pre-Code film directed by Victor Fleming for Fox Film. It stars Warner Baxter, Myrna Loy, and Noah Beery. Jules Furthman based his script on André Armandy's novel Le Renégat. Fleming shot in the Mojave Desert (with immense sets and hundreds of extras) where the extreme heat proved a severe impediment to the production. Bela Lugosi has a relatively small role as the Marabout, a Rif sheik whom Loy's character manipulates, but his character is important to the story. An uncredited Victor Jory in his film debut plays a Legion officer. Critics mostly acclaimed the film as "a great action picture" and "a box office hit" that had to be held over. It was the last film to be produced entirely by William Fox before he lost control of his studio during a hostile takeover.

== Plot ==
Morocco during the Rif War. Four unruly French Foreign Legionnaires, each with dishonorable pasts, are awarded medals for bravery in recapturing a fort. At the ceremony in Casablanca, one of them, Jean Deucalion, recognizes Eleanore in the reviewing stand. When he was a French officer during the Great War, she was Deucalion’s lover, worming military secrets from him to sell to the enemy. He was court-martialed and was about to be executed, when a German shell killed the firing squad, he escapes. Deucalion searched years for Eleanore, finally stumbling on her in Casablanca.

The four medal-winners celebrate, drunkenly crashing an officer’s ball. Eleanore happens to be there squired by Captain Mordiconi, their commandant. Deucalion catches her alone, confronts her, and tries to strangle her. Ball attendees interrupt, Deucalion’s three pals help him escape, and they end up deserting.

Deucalion and his pals turn renegade, forming an army of black natives and allying with a Rif sheik, Muhammed Halid. Captain Mordiconi has investigated Eleanore and uncovered her treacherous past. When he confronts her to turn her in, she gets a pistol from her bedroom to kill him, but suddenly Rifs overpower and kidnap her, taking her to Deucalion’s desert headquarters camp.

Deucalion orders that she is to be treated as an ordinary camp follower. Scheming for revenge, Eleanore eventually becomes Halid’s mistress and creates bad blood between the sheik and Deucalion.

When Deucalion’s native army besieges his old regiment in a desert fort without water, he is unwilling to order a final attack. Eleanore convinces Halid that Deucalion is double-crossing him, and the sheik attacks with his Rifs. Deucalion orders his men to turn their guns on the Rifs, and the legionnaires also counter-attack from the fort.

In the battle, Halid and Deucalion’s pals are killed. Eleanore directs machine-gun fire which badly wounds Deucalion, but he fatally wounds Eleanore. She calls to him, and they crawl to each other. Grinning, she shoots and kills him with a pistol.

== Cast ==
- Warner Baxter as Jean Deucalion
- Myrna Loy as Eleanore
- Noah Beery as Thurman Machwurth
- Gregory Gaye as Dmitri Vologuine
- George Cooper as Harry A. Biloxi
- Bela Lugosi as Sheik Muhammed Halid, the Marabout
- C. Henry Gordon as Captain Mordiconi
- Colin Chase as Sgt. Major Olson
- Victor Jory as Officer Belonge
- Fred Kohler Jr. as young Legionnaire
- Noah Beery Jr. as young Legionnaire
