= Richard Stapley =

English actor and screenwriter (1923–2010)

- Stapley appearing in a 1965 episode of The Saint
- Born: 20 June 1923; Westcliff-on-Sea, Essex, England, UK
- Died: 5 March 2010 (aged 86); Palm Springs, California, U.S.
- Other name: Richard Wyler
- Occupations: Actor, author
- Years active: 1948–1978
- Spouse: Elizabeth Wyler

Richard Stapley (20 June 1923 – 5 March 2010), also known by the stage name Rick Wyler, was a British actor and writer.

== Early life ==
Stapley was born in Westcliff-on-Sea, Essex, England in 1923. A writer, Stapley published his first novel when he was just 17 years old. He served in the Royal Air Force during the Second World War.

== Career ==
Following the end of the Second World War, Stapley began appearing in theatre roles in London. He soon signed with Metro-Goldwyn-Mayer (MGM), making his film debut in a supporting role in the 1948 film, The Three Musketeers. He next appeared in the 1949 remake, Little Women, in which he played John Brooke, the love interest of Janet Leigh's character, Meg.

He continued to appear in a string of Hollywood films at different studios during the 1940s and 1950s, including the 1951 period drama The Strange Door, which co-starred Boris Karloff and Charles Laughton; 1953's King of the Khyber Rifles, which starred Tyrone Power; Charge of the Lancers with Paulette Goddard; and The Iron Glove with Robert Stack in 1954. In 1955 Stapley starred in Target Zero as a British tank commander serving in the Korean War.

Stapley returned to Britain and Europe in 1960, where he adopted the stage name Richard Wyler. His British television credits from that era included the crime series, Man from Interpol and the film Identity Unknown (1960). He also appeared in the 1961–1962 American dramatic television series Window on Main Street.

He travelled to the Continent where he starred in a series of European-made adventure and western films using the name Richard Wyler, including The Barbarians, The Exterminators, The Bounty Killer, Dick Smart 2.007, and The Girl from Rio.

During the early part of the decade, he wrote Thru the Gears, a monthly feature for American magazine Motorcyclist, a weekly column for Motor Cycling magazine, Richard Wyler's Coffee Bar Column, and owned a shop in Central Road, Worcester Park, London, specialising in performance motorcycle parts and accessories. The shop was later sold to Cyril Jones.

During the 1970s, Stapley returned to film roles under his birthname, Richard Stapley. He co-starred in the 1970 film, Connecting Rooms, in a supporting role to stars Michael Redgrave and Bette Davis. He was also cast in Alfred Hitchcock's Frenzy.

When his acting roles became fewer he became a radio announcer in Britain, raced motorbikes, and in the 1970s worked part-time as a motor cycle courier.

Stapley became a naturalised US citizen during his later life. He focused on writing following his acting career. He published a novel entitled Naked Legacy in 2004. Stapley also completed a second novel and corresponding adapted screenplay, both called Tomorrow Will Be Cancelled. He was working on an autobiography at the time of his death in 2010.

Richard Stapley died of kidney failure at Desert Regional Medical Center in Palm Springs, California, on 5 March 2010, at the age of 86. His death was announced by his publicist, Alan Eichler.

== Filmography ==
Year	Title	Role	Notes
1948	The Challenge	Cliff Sonnenberg	
1948	The Three Musketeers	Albert	
1949	Little Women	John Brooke	
1951	The Strange Door	Denis de Beaulieu	
1953	King of the Khyber Rifles	Lt. Ben Baird	
1954	Charge of the Lancers	Maj. Bruce Lindsey	
1954	The Iron Glove	Prince James Stuart	
1954	Jungle Man-Eaters	Inspector Jeffrey Bernard	
1955	Target Zero	Sgt. David Kensemmit	
1956	D-Day the Sixth of June	David Archer	
1959	High Jump	Bill Ryan	
1960	Identity Unknown	John	
1960	Revak the Rebel	Captain Lycursus, Greek Mercenary	
1961	Breakfast at Tiffany's	Party Guest	Uncredited
1965	Coplan FX 18 casse tout	Coplan	
1966	The Bounty Killer	Luke Chilson	
1967	Dick Smart 2.007	Dick Smart	
1967	Un hombre vino a matar	Anthony Garnett / Rattler Kid	
1967	If One Is Born a Swine	Billy Walsh	
1968	Gunman Sent by God	Coleman	(as Richard Wyler)
1969	The Girl from Rio	Jeff Sutton	
1970	Connecting Rooms	Dick Grayson	
1972	Frenzy	Truck Driver	Uncredited
1973	Scorpio	Agent killed by Zharkov in car	Uncredited
