= James Edwards (actor) =

American film and television actor (1918–1970)

James J. Edwards
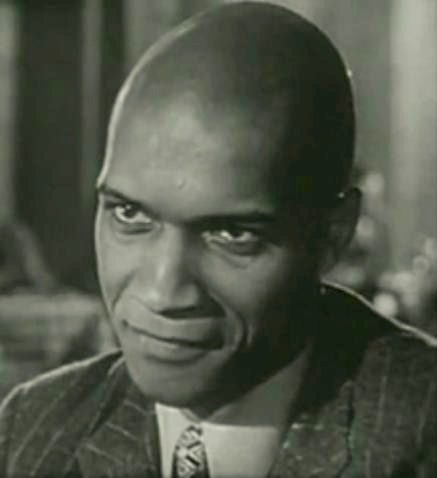
- Edwards in the 1953 film, The Joe Louis Story
- Born: James Johnson Edwards; March 6, 1918; Muncie, Indiana, U.S.
- Died: January 4, 1970 (aged 51); San Diego, California, U.S.
- Resting place: Evergreen Memorial Park, Hobart, Indiana, U.S.
- Occupation: Actor
- Years active: 1947–1969
- Spouse: Everdinne Wilson Edwards (?-1970, his death)
- Children: 1

James Johnson Edwards (March 6, 1918 – January 4, 1970) was an American actor in films and television. His most famous role was as Private Peter Moss in the 1949 film Home of the Brave, in which he portrayed a Black soldier experiencing racial prejudice while serving in the South Pacific during World War II.

== Early life and career ==
A native of Muncie, Indiana, Edwards was the eldest of six boys and two girls born to devout Baptist parents.

Hoping to emulate his hero, heavyweight champion Joe Louis, Edwards began boxing at age 11, turning pro seven years later. However, in what would prove a relatively brief career, a particularly decisive and bloody defeat prompted his horrified mother to demand Edwards' immediate retirement from the ring, and a renewed focus on his formal education.

After graduating high school, Edwards attended Indiana University before transferring to Knoxville College in Tennessee, where he majored in psychology, graduating in 1938.

During World War II, he was commissioned as a first lieutenant in the U.S. Army. During that period, he was badly injured in an automobile accident, resulting in severe facial damage requiring extensive reconstructive surgery, especially to his mouth. During his recovery, it was recommended that Edwards attend public speaking courses at nearby Northwestern University. This he did, eventually earning his master's degree in drama. The actor, interviewed following his breakout performance in Home of the Brave, gratefully recalled how pivotal that period had proved.

I did Romeo to at least 20 Juliets. During this period, I also played the prince in Death Takes A Holiday, one of the toughest roles an amateur could undertake. Later, I appeared in Little Foxes, Skin Of Our Teeth and The Petrified Forest, when they were presented at Northwestern. If it hadn't been for the army, I guess I never would have become an actor.

After the war he appeared on the New York stage when he assumed the role of the war hero in the touring play, Deep Are the Roots.

Throughout his early and mid-acting career, Edwards portrayed African American soldiers, playing such characters in Home of the Brave (1949), The Steel Helmet (1951), Bright Victory (1951), Battle Hymn (1957), Men in War (1957), Fräulein (1958), Blood and Steel (1959), and Pork Chop Hill (1959) as well as an uncredited Messman in The Caine Mutiny. (1954).

It was believed he was originally cast in Universal's Red Ball Express but was replaced by Sidney Poitier when he refused to testify before the House Un-American Activities Committee.

Other notable roles were in Stanley Kubrick's The Killing (1956) and John Frankenheimer's The Manchurian Candidate (1962).

Edwards was prolific on TV in the 1960s, playing character roles in various series such as Peter Gunn, The Fugitive, The Twilight Zone's "The Big Tall Wish", Burke's Law, Dr. Kildare and Mannix, before his death of a heart attack at the age of 51 in 1970.

One of his final roles was as General George S. Patton's longtime personal valet, Sergeant Major William George Meeks, in the film Patton, in which his character consoles Patton for being excluded from command during the Battle of Normandy.

== Death ==
James Edwards died on Sunday, January 4, 1970, in San Diego, CA. He was working on a film script in his wife's family's house in San Diego when he complained of chest pains. He was taken to Sharp Memorial Hospital, where he died. The New York Times reported that his age was given as 42. Edwards was in fact 51.

== Filmography ==
- The Set-Up (1949) as Luther Hawkins
- Home of the Brave (1949) as Private Peter Moss
- Manhandled (1949) as Henry, Bennet's Butler (uncredited)
- The Steel Helmet (1951) as Corporal Thompson
- Bright Victory (1951) as Joe Morgan
- The Member Of The Wedding (1952) as Honey Camden Brown
- The Joe Louis Story (1953) as Jack 'Chappie' Blackburn
- The Caine Mutiny (1954) as Whittaker (uncredited)
- Alfred Hitchcock Presents (1955) (Season 1 Episode 7: "Breakdown") as Convict
- African Manhunt (1955) as Native Guide
- Seven Angry Men (1955) as Ned Green
- The Phenix City Story (1955) as Zeke Ward
- Alfred Hitchcock Presents (1956) (Season 1 Episode 15: "The Big Switch") as Ed
- The Killing (1956) as Track Parking Attendant
- Battle Hymn (1957) as Lieutenant Maples
- Men in War (1957) as Sergeant Killian
- Fräulein (1958) as Corporal S. Hanks
- Tarzan's Fight for Life (1958) as Futa
- Anna Lucasta (1958) as Eddie
- Night of the Quarter Moon (1959) as Asa Tully
- Pork Chop Hill (1959) as Corporal Jurgens
- Blood and Steel (1959) as George
- The Manchurian Candidate (1962) as Corporal Allen Melvin
- Legend of Bearheart (1964) released as Legend of the Northwest in 1978
- The Sandpiper (1965) as Larry Brant
- The Virginian (1968, TV Series) as The Mustangers
- The Young Runaways (1968) as Sergeant Joe Collyer
- Coogan's Bluff (1968) as Sergeant Jackson
- Patton (1970) as Sergeant Major William George Meeks (posthumous release)
- Doomsday Voyage (1972) as Coast Guard Officer (posthumous release)
- Legend of the Northwest (1978) (posthumous release; final film role)
