= The Trespasser (1947 film) =

1947 film by George Blair

- Theatrical release poster
- Directed by: George Blair
- Screenplay by: Dorrell McGowan; Stuart E. McGowan; Jerome Gruskin
- Story by: Jerry Sackheim; Erwin S. Gelsey
- Produced by: William J. O'Sullivan
- Starring: Dale Evans; Warren Douglas; Janet Martin; Douglas Fowley; Adele Mara; Gregory Gaye
- Cinematography: John Alton
- Edited by: Arthur Roberts
- Music by: Mort Glickman; Ernest Gold; Nathan Scott
- Production company: Republic Pictures
- Distributed by: Republic Pictures
- Release date: July 3, 1947
- Running time: 71 minutes
- Country: United States
- Language: English

The Trespasser is a 1947 American action film directed by George Blair, written by Dorrell McGowan, Stuart E. McGowan and Jerome Gruskin, and starring Dale Evans, Warren Douglas, Janet Martin, Douglas Fowley, Adele Mara and Gregory Gaye. It was released on July 3, 1947, by Republic Pictures.

== Cast ==
- Dale Evans as Linda Coleman
- Warren Douglas as Danny 'Dan' Butler
- Janet Martin as Stephanie 'Stevie' Carson
- Douglas Fowley as Bill Monroe
- Adele Mara as Dee Dee
- Gregory Gaye as Mr. E. Charles
- Grant Withers as Detective Lt. Kirk
- William Bakewell as Bruce Coleman
- Vince Barnett as Bartender
- Francis Pierlot as Channing Bliss
- Joy Barlow as Mary Lou
- Fred Graham as Davis
- Dale Van Sickel as Hall
- Betty Alexander as Jane Walters
- Joseph Crehan as The Doctor
