= Seven Doors to Death =

1944 film by Elmer Clifton

- Film poster
- Directed by: Elmer Clifton
- Written by: Helen Kiely (story); Elmer Clifton (screenplay)
- Produced by: Arthur Alexander (co-producer); Alfred Stern (co-producer)
- Starring: Chick Chandler; June Clyde; George Meeker
- Cinematography: Robert E. Cline
- Edited by: Charles Henkel Jr.
- Production company: Alexander-Stern Pictures
- Distributed by: Producers Releasing Corporation
- Release date: July 27, 1944
- Running time: 64 minutes
- Country: United States
- Language: English

Seven Doors to Death (also known as Vanishing Corpses in its American reissue title) is a 1944 American film directed by Elmer Clifton and starring Chick Chandler, June Clyde and George Meeker. The film is a comedy/mystery film that was written by Clifton, a prolific independent film director of the era.

== Plot ==
At the Hamilton Court shops in Los Angeles, a shot rings out in a darkened apartment. A woman (June Clyde) screams and flees, seeing a car driven by architect Jimmy McMillan (Chick Chandler). She orders him at gunpoint to speed away, in the rush to get away. The car crashes, but the woman disappears. After returning to the scene, McMillan finds a corpse and calls Capt. William Jaffe (Michael Raffetto). By the time the police arrive, the corpse has mysteriously changed to that of a different victim.

The Police Captain recognizes the dead man as Mary Rawling's lawyer. Summoning Rawlings, the owner of the Hamilton Court, McMillan immediately sees that she was the woman in his car. Her alibi does not seem convincing to Jaffe or McMillan, who decides to start his own investigation, starting with the shopkeepers at the Hamilton Court. Antique dealer Donald Adams (Milton Wallace), recalls on the night of the murder, a rare Egyptian chest was stolen from his shop. When McMillan finds the stolen chest, he also finds the man who was killed.

Another suspect, the silversmith Claude Burns (Edgar Dearing) is killed, and as furrier Charles Eaton (George Meeker) becomes involved, Mary is arrested but she is convinced that she is being framed. Ultimately, a confrontation between her accusers leads to the discovery of stolen jewels and the real culprit.

== Cast ==
- Chick Chandler as Jimmy McMillan
- June Clyde as Mary Rawling
- George Meeker as Charles Eaton
- Michael Raffetto as Capt. William Jaffe
- Gregory Gaye as Henry Butler aka Gregor
- Edgar Dearing as Claude Burns
- Rebel Randall as Mable De Rose
- Milton Wallace as Donald Adams
- Casey MacGregor as Timothy Green

== Production ==
Principal photography on the production took place from May 17 to late May 1944 in Los Angeles. The Crossroads of the World Center in Hollywood featured prominently as the setting for the film. Although produced on a minuscule budget, Clifton made films in the 1940s in a very professional manner, working in various genres including western films. Chick Chandler, more known as a character or bit part comic actor had one of his few starring roles in Seven Doors to Death.

== Reception ==
Seven Doors to Death was hampered by a limited budget and stagey production values, and as a B-movie, was not reviewed by traditional sources. In a more recent appraisal, the film did not stand up well. Reviewer Bill Barstad called it "one dull mystery" and "(a) ... mediocre mystery plot with a weak screenplay."

The film was broadcast in the 2004 New Condensed Classics television series in an abbreviated 20-minute version. It has also been shown in the UK on Talking Pictures TV.
