= Blood and Steel (1959 film) =

1959 film

- Theatrical release poster
- Directed by: Bernard L. Kowalski
- Screenplay by: Joseph C. Gilette
- Produced by: Gene Corman
- Starring: John Lupton; James Edwards; Brett Halsey; John Brinkley; Allen Jung; Ziva Rodann
- Cinematography: Floyd Crosby
- Edited by: Anthony Carras
- Music by: Calvin Jackson
- Production company: Associated Producers
- Distributed by: 20th Century Fox
- Release date: December 30, 1959
- Running time: 63 minutes
- Country: United States
- Language: English

Blood and Steel is a 1959 American drama film directed by Bernard L. Kowalski and written by Joseph C. Gilette. The film stars John Lupton, James Edwards, Brett Halsey, John Brinkley, Allen Jung and Ziva Rodann. The film was released on December 30, 1959, by 20th Century Fox. It was also known as Condemened Patrol.

== Plot ==
A native girl helps US Seabees free her villagers from Japanese troops. In 1943 a recon patrol of four CBs is sent to Gizo Island in the Southwest Pacific. Their objective is to find out whether the small island is suitable for building an airfield after an American landing operation. They face a small Japanese force that enjoys the insignificance of their post and sake. The only black GI hurts his leg and hides in the jungle. He is discovered by the young native woman (for some reason in a tight skirt). She helps him to hide and he is able to blow up the Japanese "headquarters." Finally the patrol loses one man and has to leave the girl behind as they embark on their small raft.

== Cast ==
- John Lupton as Lieutenant Dave Jenson
- James Edwards as George
- Brett Halsey as Jim
- John Brinkley as Cip
- Bill Saito as Sugi
- Allen Jung as Japanese Commander
- Ziva Rodann as Native Girl
- James Hong as Japanese Draftsman
- Clarence Lung as Japanese Soldier

== Production ==
The movie title can be seen in a 1958 Felix the Cat cartoon (The Hairy Berry Bush, ep. 55) at about the 1:35 mark, where Rock Bottom is reading a newspaper, which apparently, was a snippet of the actual newsprint inserted into the animation.
