= Fernanda Eliscu =

Romanian-American actress (1880–1968)

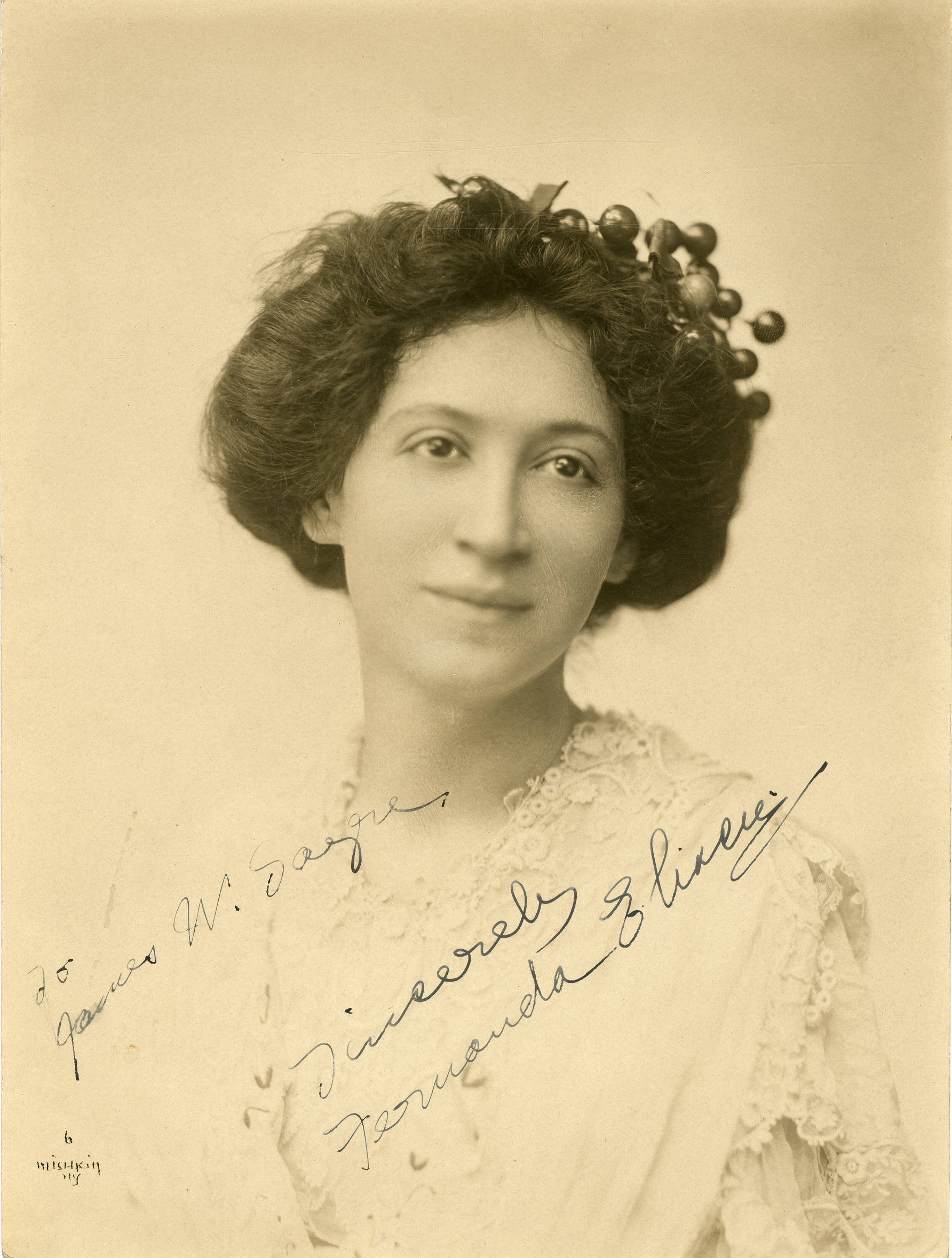
- Eliscu in 1909
- Born: April 24, 1880; Iași, Romania
- Died: September 26, 1968 (aged 88); Los Angeles, California, U.S.
- Occupation: Actress
- Years active: 1899–1957
- Spouse: Carl Anthony Pfeil (died 1930)
- Children: 3

Fernanda Eliscu (April 24, 1880 – September 27, 1968) was a Romanian-born actress in the United States, in English and Yiddish productions on stage and screen.

== Early life ==
Fernanda Eliscu was born in Iași, Romania (some sources say Bucharest). She moved to the United States as a girl with her parents. She trained at the American Academy of Dramatic Arts, and at Cooper Union.

== Career ==
Early in her acting career, Eliscu was associated with Minnie Maddern Fiske and Maude Adams. On stage, Eliscu acted in The Little Minister, Cyrano de Bergerac (1899), Beau Brummel (1899), Her Majesty (1900), Don Caesar's Return (1901), The Smoldering Flame, Pickpockets, Jacque Duval, Romeo and Juliet (1903), Marta of the Lowlands (1903), The Light from Saint Agnes (1906), Ruth (1907), The Third Degree (1909-1910), The Outsider (1924, 1928), If I Were You (1931), Triplets (1932), Creeping Fire (1935), and Winterset (1936). Her extensive collection of hair ornaments, combs, pins, and clasps, was considered remarkable.

In 1909, the Los Angeles Times theatre critic raved about Eliscu, assuring readers that "If the name of Fernanda Eliscu is not inscribed high in the records of dramatic accomplishment during the next ten years, it will be because either dramatic accomplishment or Fernanda Eliscu has ceased to exist."

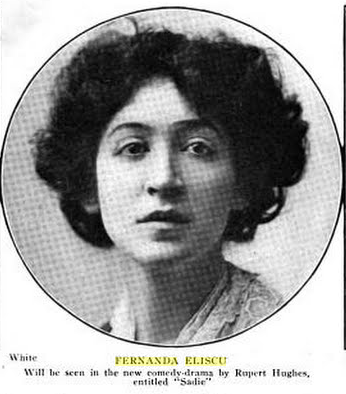
Fernanda Eliscu, from a 1911 publication.

Eliscu also appeared in films, including Winterset (1936), Background to Danger (1943), Berlin Express (1948), Harbor of Missing Men (1950), and Charge of the Lancers (1954).

== Personal life ==
Fernanda Eliscu married actor Carl Anthony Pfeil. They had three children before Pfeil died in 1930. Fernanda Eliscu died in 1968, in Los Angeles, California, aged 88 years.

== Filmography ==
Year	Title	Role	Notes
1936	Winterset	Piny	
1943	Background to Danger	Turkish Wife on Train	Uncredited
1943	The Song of Bernadette	Townswoman	Uncredited
1944	You Can't Ration Love	Mrs. Boskowsky	Uncredited
1944	Uncertain Glory	Middle-Aged Woman at Meeting	Uncredited
1945	A Tree Grows in Brooklyn	Minor Role	Uncredited
1945	Her Highness and the Bellboy	Diplomat's Wife	Uncredited
1946	Gilda	Bendolin's Wife	Uncredited
1946	The Verdict	French Housekeeper	Uncredited
1947	Unconquered	Squaw	Uncredited
1947	Desire Me	Old Woman	Uncredited
1947	A Double Life	Landlady	Uncredited
1948	Arch of Triumph	Flower Woman	Uncredited
1948	Berlin Express	German Woman	Uncredited
1949	Samson and Delilah	Herdswoman	Uncredited
1950	Black Hand	Minor Role	Uncredited
1950	Harbor of Missing Men	Mama Corcoris	
1952	Viva Zapata!	Fuentes' Wife	Uncredited
1953	Remains to Be Seen	Minor Role	Uncredited
1954	Charge of the Lancers	Keta	
1957	Istanbul	Cleaning Woman	Uncredited, (final film role)
