= What a Widow! =

1930 film

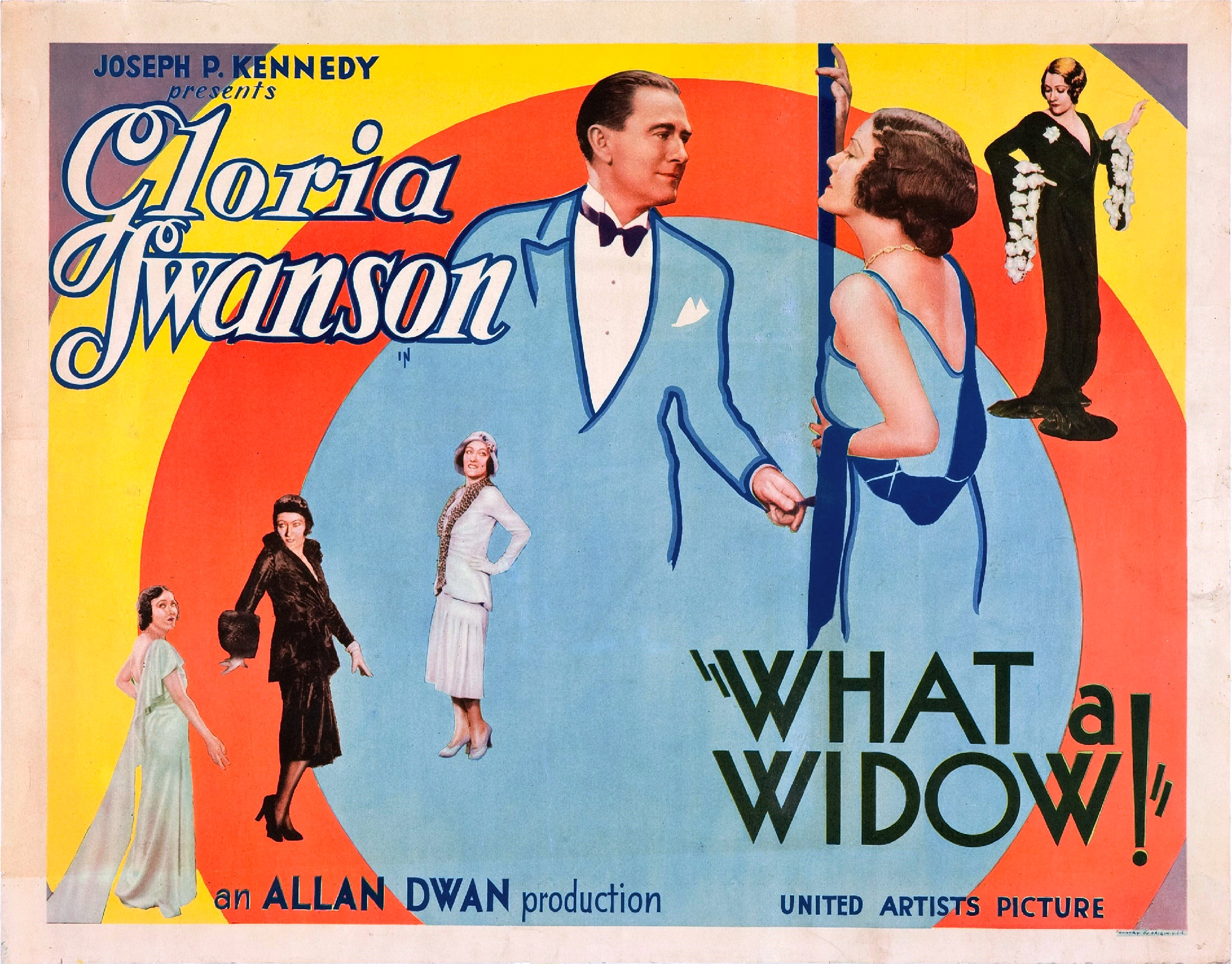
- Lobby card
- Directed by: Allan Dwan; Dudley Murphy (uncredited); James Seymour (uncredited)
- Screenplay by: James Gleason; James Seymour
- Story by: Josephine Lovett
- Produced by: Gloria Swanson; Joseph P. Kennedy; Allan Dwan
- Starring: Gloria Swanson; Owen Moore; Lew Cody
- Cinematography: George Barnes
- Edited by: Viola Lawrence
- Music by: Hugo Felix; Josiah Zuro
- Production company: Gloria Productions
- Distributed by: United Artists
- Release date: August 13, 1930
- Running time: 88 minutes
- Country: United States
- Language: English

What a Widow! is a 1930 American pre-Code musical romantic comedy film directed by Allan Dwan and produced by and starring Gloria Swanson. The music was written by Vincent Youmans. It was distributed through United Artists. Although rumored to have been lost for decades, the film is extant in two complete 35mm copies at the George Eastman Museum.

The film was produced by Joseph P. Kennedy Sr. It received generally positive reviews and was noted for its animated title sequence created by William Dietz, but was met with indifferent returns at the box office mainly due to the backlash against musical films late in 1930. Due to the public's backlash against musicals, United Artists downplayed the fact that the film was a musical, removed references to Vincent Youmans and his songs and advertised the film as a romantic comedy.

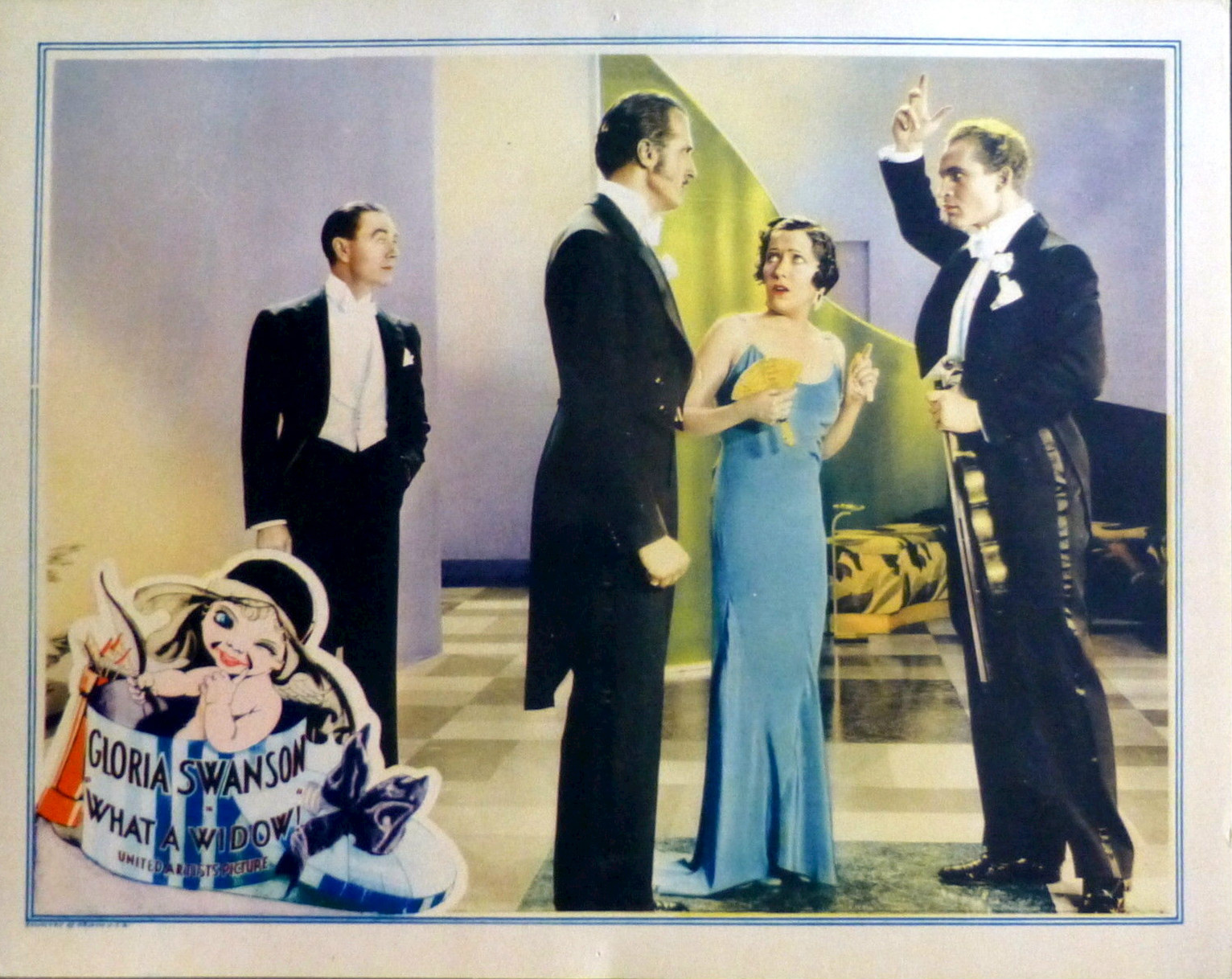
Lobby card showing a still of Lew Cody, Gregory Gaye, Gloria Swanson, and Owen Moore.

== Cast ==
- Gloria Swanson as Tamarind Brook
- Owen Moore as Gerry Morgan
- Lew Cody as Victor
- Margaret Livingston as Valli
- William Holden as Mr. Lodge
- Herbert Braggiotti as Jose Alvarado
- Gregory Gaye as Baslikoff
- Adrienne D'Ambricourt as Paulette
- Nella Walker as Marquise
- Daphne Pollard as Masseuse
- Reginald Sharland (uncredited)

== Music ==
The film features three songs with music by Vincent Youmans and lyrics by J. Russel Robinson and George Waggner. The songs are titled "Love Is Like a Song," "Say 'Oui' Cheri" and "You're the One" and were all sung by Gloria Swanson in the film. Gloria Swansons also recorded the songs for Victor Records. Due to the public's backlash against musicals the recordings were not released however.

== Preservation status ==
Two 35mm film fragments are housed at the George Eastman Museum. According to the museum this fragment (two copies of the same fragment) is 350ft of reel 5 (which equals about 4 minutes of footage). The soundtrack is preserved at the UCLA Film and Television Archive, and the trailer is preserved at the Library of Congress.
