= The Steel Helmet =

1951 Korean War film by Samuel Fuller

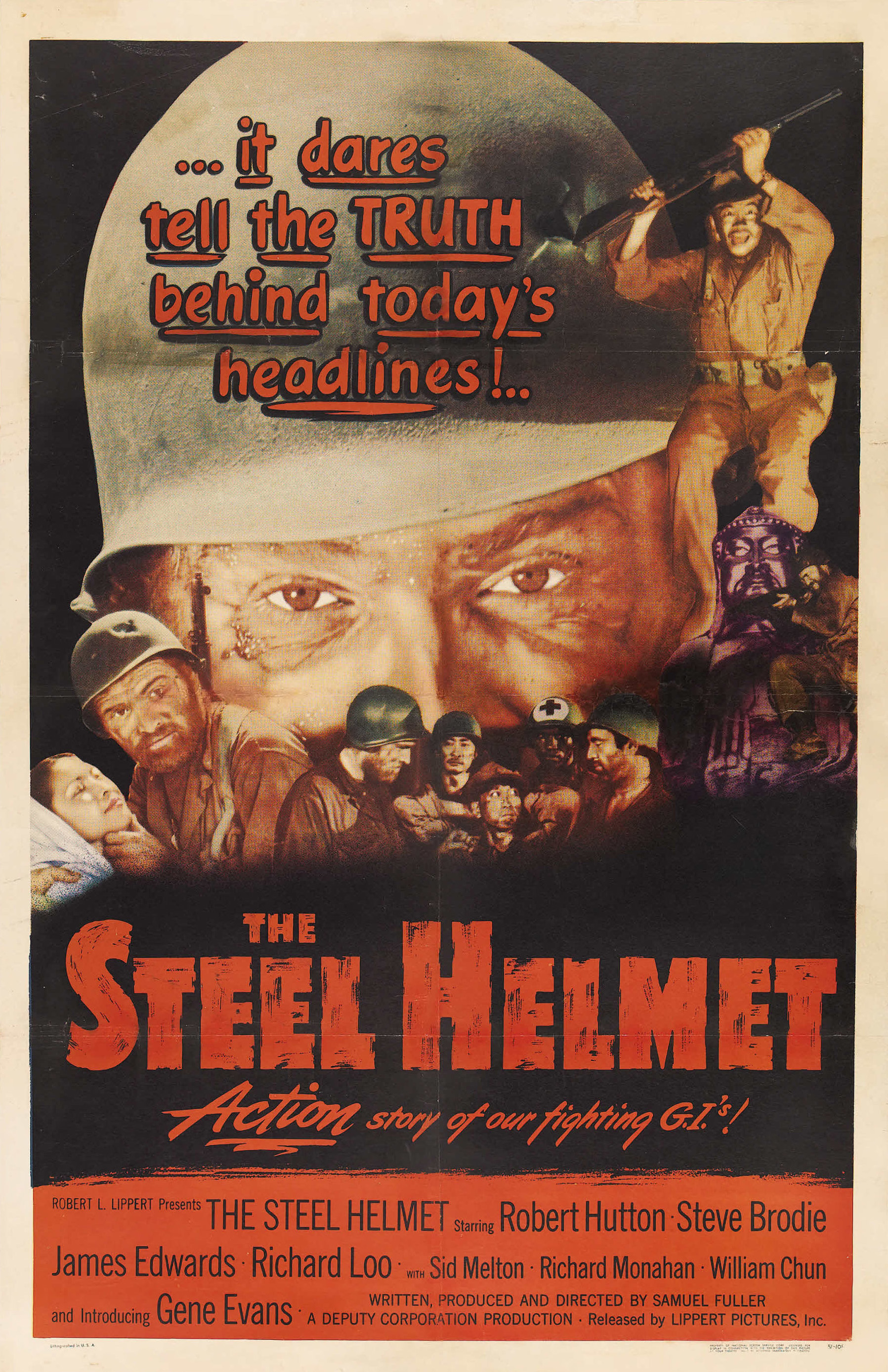
- Theatrical release poster
- Directed by: Samuel Fuller
- Written by: Samuel Fuller
- Produced by: Samuel Fuller
- Starring: Gene Evans; Robert Hutton; Steve Brodie; James Edwards; Richard Loo; Sid Melton
- Cinematography: Ernest Miller
- Edited by: Philip Cahn
- Music by: Paul Dunlap
- Production company: Deputy Corporation
- Distributed by: Lippert Pictures
- Release dates: January 11, 1951 (Los Angeles); January 24, 1951 (New York)
- Running time: 85 minutes
- Country: United States
- Language: English
- Budget: $104,000

The Steel Helmet is a 1951 American independent Korean War film directed, written and produced by Samuel Fuller. The film stars Gene Evans, Robert Hutton, Steve Brodie, James Edwards and Richard Loo. It was the first American film about the war and the first of several war films by Fuller.

== Plot ==
In Korea, U.S. Army Sergeant Zack survives a massacre of American prisoners of war by the Korean People's Army after his M1 helmet saves him from a bullet intended for his head. Left bound and injured as the sole survivor of his surrendered unit, Zack struggles to climb a steep hill and freezes at the approach of a Buddhist boy with a gun who frees him and treats his wounds with sulfa powder. When the boy refuses to leave, Zack relents, dubs him "Short Round" and directs him to gather clothing and equipment from his dead comrades to join him as he tries to find friendly lines.

Zack and Short Round encounter Corporal Thompson, an African American 19th Infantry medic, also the sole survivor of his platoon. They meet a patrol led by the inexperienced Lieutenant Driscoll, whose men say that Thompson is a "straggler" who intentionally separated himself from his platoon and that the North Koreans only kept him alive to treat their wounded. When a sniper team attacks, Zack and Japanese American Sergeant Tanaka kill the marksmen. Zack reluctantly agrees to guide the patrol to a Buddhist temple to establish an observation post, but on the way, Lt. Driscoll orders a soldier to collect a casualty's dog tags, triggering a booby trap that kills the soldier.

The men reach the apparently deserted temple without further incident, but that night, a North Korean major hiding there kills Joe, who is the sentry. The major tries to subvert Thompson and Tanaka by mentioning the racism they face in the United States and among their supposed comrades, but his attempts fail and the major is captured by Zack, whose last assignment was to bring a prisoner for questioning, with furlough as a potential reward. Before they leave, Lt. Driscoll asks to exchange helmets for luck, but Zack refuses out of disrespect.

Short Round is later killed by a North Korean sniper, devastating Zack. When the major mocks the Buddhist prayer that the boy wrote, Zack loses control and wounds him. Driscoll upbraids Zack for failing to remain professional, and Zack demands that Thompson heal the major so that he can be interrogated at headquarters.

The patrol spots a large North Korean force approaching and calls for an artillery strike, but it only alerts the North Koreans to their presence, and they mount an assault on the temple with a tank. The patrol repels the attack but inflicts severe casualties, leaving only Zack, Thompson, Tanaka and the unit's radio operator alive. Overcome by the chaos, Zack, a World War II veteran, suffers a flashback, imagining that he is back at the Normandy landings searching for his colonel.

Some time later, with the battle complete, a U.S. Army infantry unit arrives to relieve the beleaguered survivors. As he leaves the temple, Zack visits Lt. Driscoll's grave and swaps their helmets. The men walk away through an archway.

== Cast ==
- Gene Evans as Sergeant Zack
- Robert Hutton as Private Bronte
- Steve Brodie as Lieutenant Driscoll
- James Edwards as Corporal Thompson
- Richard Loo as Sergeant Tanaka
- Sid Melton as Joe
- Richard Monahan as Private Baldy
- William Chun as Short Round
- Harold Fong as The Red
- Neyle Morrow as First GI
- Lynn Stalmaster as Second Lieutenant

== Production ==
Fuller produced and directed his film over the course of ten days in October 1950. Exteriors were shot in Griffith Park, with 25 UCLA students hired as extras. The film's production cost was $104,000.

The Steel Helmet confronts racism when a North Korean communist prisoner baits a black soldier over the inequalities that he faces and is rebuffed. The North Korean soldier also utters perhaps the first mention in a Hollywood film of the internment of Japanese Americans in World War II. The film infuriated some in the American military, particularly for a scene in which Zack kills a prisoner of war. When Army personnel questioned Fuller, he replied that he frequently witnessed such acts during his own service in World War II, and he asked his former commanding officer Brigadier General George A. Taylor to phone the Pentagon to confirm his assertion. According to Fuller, the communist newspaper The Daily Worker stated that The Steel Helmet "shows what beasts American soldiers are" while calling him a reactionary for making heroes of these types of characters.

Fuller cast Gene Evans in the lead role, refusing one major studio's interest in filming The Steel Helmet with John Wayne as Sergeant Zack. Fuller threatened to quit when the producers wanted Evans replaced with Larry Parks. Mickey Knox claimed to have been Fuller's first choice for the role, which he declined.

James Edwards, who portrays Corporal Thompson, suffered a broken nose during filming.

== Reception ==
In a contemporary review for The New York Times, critic Bosley Crowther wrote:

For an obviously low-budget picture that was shot in some phenomenally short time, Samuel Fuller's metallic "The Steel Helmet" has some surprisingly good points. ... Mr. Fuller has plainly tried to create something like the reported climate of that war. In his dramatic exposition of the adventures of an American infantry patrol, ... the writer-director-producer has sidestepped the romantic war clichés and has taken a distinctly melancholy and dismal view of the business at hand. ... In short, Mr. Fuller has managed to work into his modest film a great many implications of ineffectualness in the Korean war. At the same time, he has caught intimations of the courage and resourcefulness of these men, and he has staged an elementary demonstration of democratic principle through the Negro and a Nisei in the patrol. Unfortunately, the texture of this picture, apparent in the staging and the sets, is patently artificial. The illusion of reality never really comes through, and the consequence is an awareness of "acting" all the time. ... As for the melodramatic plotting and the battle action in this film, it betrays the low-budget production and brings the whole show down to tangible make-believe.

Critic Philip K. Scheuer of the Los Angeles Times wrote: "'The Steel Helmet' is not only the first made-in-Hollywood movie about the war in Korea; it sets the mark at which Hollywood will be shooting for a long time to come. Also, and significantly, it bears the stamp of one man: Samuel Fuller, who wrote, produced and directed it. In 'The Steel Helmet' he has achieved the best-integrated one-man cinematic job since Robert Rossen's 'All the King's Men.'"

In a review for Variety, William Brogdon wrote: "Lippert Pictures has what would seem a sure money film in 'The Steel Helmet.' It pinpoints the Korean fighting in a grim, hardhitting tale that is excellently told. Timely exploitation values are supplied in a story that makes no bid for obvious sensationalism, yet has it."

Harrison's Reports wrote: "The first honest-to-goodness Korean war melodrama. It is destined to take its place among the best war pictures ever produced. It has been directed by Samuel Fuller so skillfully that the spectator's attention is held as if in a vise from the beginning to the end."
