= Dick Smart 2.007 =

1967 Italian film by Franco Prosperi

- Directed by: Franco Prosperi
- Screenplay by: Ottavio Alessi; Giorgio Simonelli; Duccio Tessari
- Story by: Giorgio Moser
- Starring: Richard Stapley; Margaret Lee
- Cinematography: Roberto Gerardi
- Edited by: Renato Cinquini
- Music by: Mario Nascimbene
- Release date: 9 March 1967 (Italy)
- Running time: 102 minutes
- Country: Italy
- Language: Italian

Dick Smart 2.007 is a 1967 Italian film directed by Franco Prosperi and starring Richard Stapley and Margaret Lee.

== Plot ==
Secret agent Dick Smart has been assigned by the CIA to investigate the disappearance of five world-renowned nuclear scientists. Lady Lorraine Lister is the head of a criminal organization who hides the five scientists in her secret underground lair located inside the Corcovado in Rio de Janeiro, and finances their experiments. Dick Smart discovers that Lady Lorraine Lister and Dutch banker Black Diamond have built a nuclear reactor to obtain diamonds from carbon by exploding an atomic bomb.

== Cast ==
- Richard Stapley as Dick Smart (as Richard Wyler)
- Margaret Lee as Lady Lorraine Lister
- Rosana Tapajos as Jeanine Stafford
- Ambrosio Fregolente as Black Diamond
- Flavia Balbi as Patricia
- Elio Guerriero as Scioloff
- Alfredo Leuti
- Valentino Macchi
- Tullio Altamura
- Bernadette Kell
- Assunta De Paoli
- Paolo Ginori Conti
- Guido Lauzi
- Giuseppe Schettino
- Max Turilli

== Production ==
The film was noted for featuring a Vespa 180 SS scooter, which in the film was able to fly and dive underwater.

== Release ==
Film Fatales: Women in Espionage Films and Television, 1962-1973 reports that the film was relegated to late-night viewings on Italian television, and there is no record of a U.S. or British theatrical release, even in the sixties.

== Reception ==
Tom Lisanti and Louis Paul in Film Fatales: Women in Espionage Films and Television, 1962-1973 criticized "the listless direction of Franco Prosperi" (which the book confuses with Franco E. Prosperi, one of the co-directors of Mondo Cane) and "the obvious low budget (spare sets, monotonous camera set-ups)".

== Bibliography ==
- Poppi, Roberto; Pecorari, Mario (1992). Dizionario del cinema italiano: I film, Vol. 3, Dal 1960 al 1969. Rome: Gremese Editore.
