= Ross Elliott =

American actor (1917–1999)

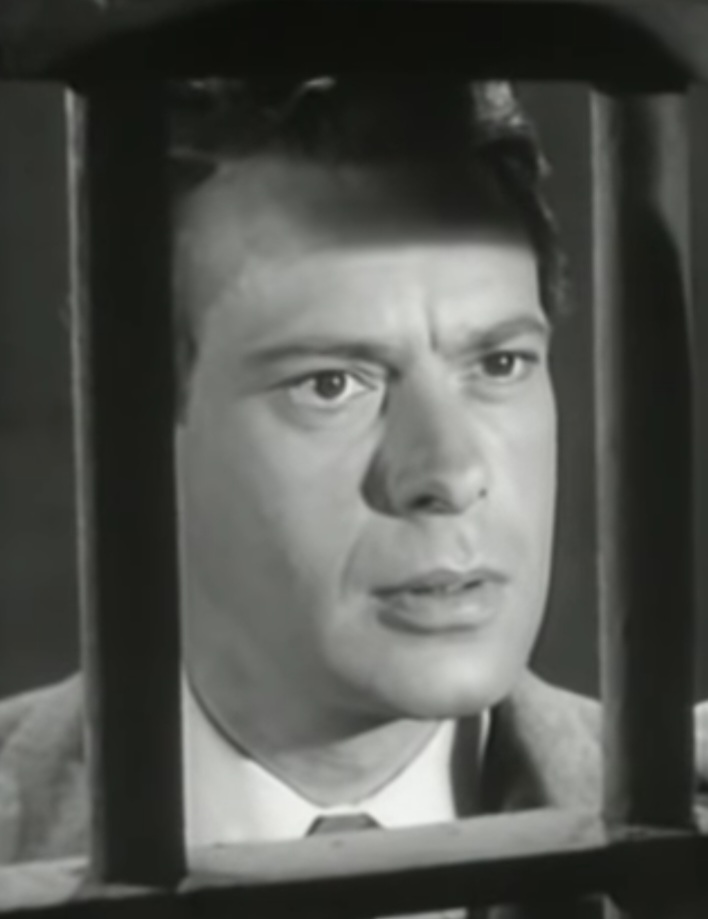
- Elliott in Indestructible Man (1956)
- Born: Elliott Blum; June 18, 1917; New York City, New York, U.S.
- Died: August 12, 1999 (aged 82); Los Angeles, California, U.S.
- Occupation: Actor
- Years active: 1938–1986
- Spouse: Esther Susan Melling (m. 1954)

Ross Elliott (born Elliott Blum; June 18, 1917 – August 12, 1999) was an American television and film character actor. He began his acting career in the Mercury Theatre, where he performed in Orson Welles' 1938 radio broadcast of The War of the Worlds.

== Early years ==
Elliott was born in the borough of the Bronx in New York City. While at City College of New York, he participated in the college's dramatic society, causing him to abandon his original plan to become a lawyer.

== Radio and stage ==
Directly out of college, Elliott joined Orson Welles' Mercury Theatre, garnering bit parts both on the radio, including War of the Worlds production in 1938, and stage, including Welles' Caesar (1937–1938). Elliott's Broadway credits include The Shoemaker's Holiday (1938), Danton's Tod (1938), Morning Star (1940), This Is the Army (1942), and Apple of His Eye (1946). In 1972, he returned to the stage in Shakespeare's King Lear with the Santa Monica Theater Guild.

== Military service ==
Elliott joined the United States Army on August 4, 1941. Much of his time there was spent in "soldier-casts of various touring shows".

== Film career ==
After serving in World War II, Elliott moved to Hollywood. He enjoyed a long career, working steadily in supporting roles in a diverse array of films, including Woman on the Run, D-Day the Sixth of June, The Beast from 20,000 Fathoms, Tarantula!, Wild Seed, Kelly's Heroes, Skyjacked, and The Towering Inferno. In 1971, Elliott was invited to membership in the Actors Branch of the Academy of Motion Picture Arts and Sciences, later serving on its board and remaining a member until his death in 1999.

== Television ==
Throughout his career, Elliott appeared in more than 200 television programs, including the recurring role of crewman Cort Ryker on the syndicated The Blue Angels (1960–1961). Elliott appeared 59 times in a recurring role as Sheriff Abbott on NBC's Western series, The Virginian.

Elliott portrayed the television director "Ross Elliot" (that is, the script used his actual name) in the season-one episode of I Love Lucy titled "Lucy Does a TV Commercial" (1952), in which Lucy Ricardo advertises Vitameatavegamin. Elliott also appeared on I Love Lucy as Ricky's agent in three episodes of the series' fourth season.

In 1956, he appeared as Sam Wilson on the TV Western Cheyenne in the episode titled "Mustang Trail". In 1958, Elliott played Reverend Kilgore in the episode "The Lord Will Provide" on The Texan, with Rory Calhoun and Ellen Corby. Later that year, he played murder victim and title character George Hartley Beaumont in the Perry Mason episode "The Case of the Corresponding Corpse".

In 1960 and 1961, Elliott appeared twice on Leave it to Beaver as Mr. Foster, Wally's English teacher. From 1962 to 1963, he was cast as Marty Rhodes in four episodes of the NBC legal drama Sam Benedict. From 1963 to 1965, Elliott played Lee Baldwin on the ABC Daytime soap opera General Hospital.

Elliott appeared in 11 episodes of The Jack Benny Program as director Freddie. His other television appearances included Adventures of Superman, Burns and Allen, The Twilight Zone, The Dick Van Dyke Show, The Andy Griffith Show, The Lone Ranger, Pony Express, The Rifleman, Rawhide, Gunsmoke (title character Lee Groat in S5E17’s "Groat’s Grudge" - 1957), Leave It to Beaver, Lassie, The Silent Service, Combat!, Hazel, The Time Tunnel, Voyage to the Bottom of the Sea, Pistols 'n' Petticoats, Dragnet, Emergency!, The Invaders, Adam-12, The Six Million Dollar Man, The Bionic Woman, Wonder Woman, The Dukes of Hazzard, and Little House on the Prairie. Elliott also appeared in a 1973 episode of Barnaby Jones.

== Later life and death ==
As his acting career waned, Elliott in 1976 joined a local real estate firm as a sales associate and later as a manager. He died of cancer on August 12, 1999, at the age of 82.

== Selected filmography ==
- This Is the Army (1943) as Officer in Magician Skit
- The Burning Cross (1947) as The Combative Striker
- Angel on the Amazon (1948) as Frank Lane
- Streets of San Francisco (1949) as Clevens
- The Crooked Way (1949) as Coroner (uncredited)
- Barbary Pirate (1949) as Preble's First Officer (uncredited)
- The Gal Who Took the West (1949) as Cowboy (uncredited)
- Chinatown at Midnight (1949) as Eddie Marsh
- Gun Crazy (1950) as Detective (uncredited)
- Tyrant of the Sea (1950) as Mr. Howard Palmer
- Dynamite Pass (1950) as Henchman Stryker
- Cody of the Pony Express (1950) as Irv, Henchman
- Three Secrets (1950) as Reporter (uncredited)
- Woman on the Run (1950) as Frank Johnson
- Last of the Buccaneers (1950) as Fanuche, Pirate (uncredited)
- Chicago Calling (1951) as Jim
- Storm Warning (1951) as Glen (uncredited)
- I Can Get It for You Wholesale (1951) as Ray
- Hot Lead (1951) as Dave Collins
- Desert of Lost Men (1951) as Dr. Jim Haynes
- The Adventures of Superman (1952) episode - "Superman On Earth"
- Loan Shark (1952) as Norm, Laundryman Thug (uncredited)
- Affair in Trinidad (1952) as Corpse of Neal Emery (uncredited)
- Woman in the Dark (1952) as Father Tony Morello
- Problem Girls (1953) as John Page
- The Beast from 20,000 Fathoms (1953) as George Ritchie
- Tumbleweed (1953) as Seth Blanden
- Ma and Pa Kettle at Home (1954) as Pete Crosby
- Massacre Canyon (1954) as Private George W. Davis
- Dragnet (1954) as Intelligence Division Sergeant at Desk (uncredited)
- African Manhunt (1955) as Rene Carvel
- Carolina Cannonball (1955) as Don Mack
- Women's Prison (1955) as Don Jensen
- Tarantula (1955) as Joe Burch
- Toughest Man Alive (1955) as Security Agent Cal York
- Indestructible Man (1956) as Paul Lowe
- Science Fiction Theater (1956) Season 2, Episode 33 "Sun Gold"
- D-Day the Sixth of June (1956) as Major Mills
- Chain of Evidence (1957) as Bob Bradfield
- As Young as We Are (1958) as Bob
- Monster on the Campus (1958) as Sergeant Eddie Daniels
- Never So Few (1959) as Colonel Dr. Barry (uncredited)
- Sea Hunt (1960, The Catalyst, Season 3, Episode 32)
- Gunsmoke (1960, “Groat’s Revenge” S5E17 as Lee Grayson, 1960, “The Lady Killer” S5E32 as Grant Lucas)
- Sea Hunt (1961, Season 4, Episodes 1, 3, 4, 7, 35)
- Wanted: Dead or Alive (1961) season 3 episode 16 (The last restreat) as Jim Lawton
- Tammy Tell Me True (1961) as Professor Bateman
- Bonanza (1961-1973, 3 episodes) as Watkins / Matthew / Harvey Walters
- The Alfred Hitchcock Hour (1963) (Season 2 Episode 5: "Blood Bargain") as Lieutenant Geer
- The Thrill of It All (1963) as Minor Role (uncredited)
- The Crawling Hand (1963) as Deputy Earl Harrison
- The Wheeler Dealers (1963) as Lawyer (uncredited)
- The Lively Set (1964) as Ernie Owens
- Wild Seed (1965) as Mr. Collinge
- Day of the Evil Gun (1968) as Reverend Yearby
- The Invaders (1968, Counter-Attack, Season 2, Episode 18) as Professor Eliot Kramer
- Kelly's Heroes (1970) as Colonel Booker
- Skyjacked (1972) as Harold Shaw
- The Longest Night (1972) as Dr. Steven Clay
- Act of Vengeance (1974) as Sergeant Long
- The Towering Inferno (1974) as Deputy Chief #2
- Gable and Lombard (1976) as Lombard's Director
- Mr. Too Little (1979) as Police Captain
- Scorpion (1986) as Sam Douglas (final film role)
