= Gregory Gaye =

Russian-American actor (1900–1993)

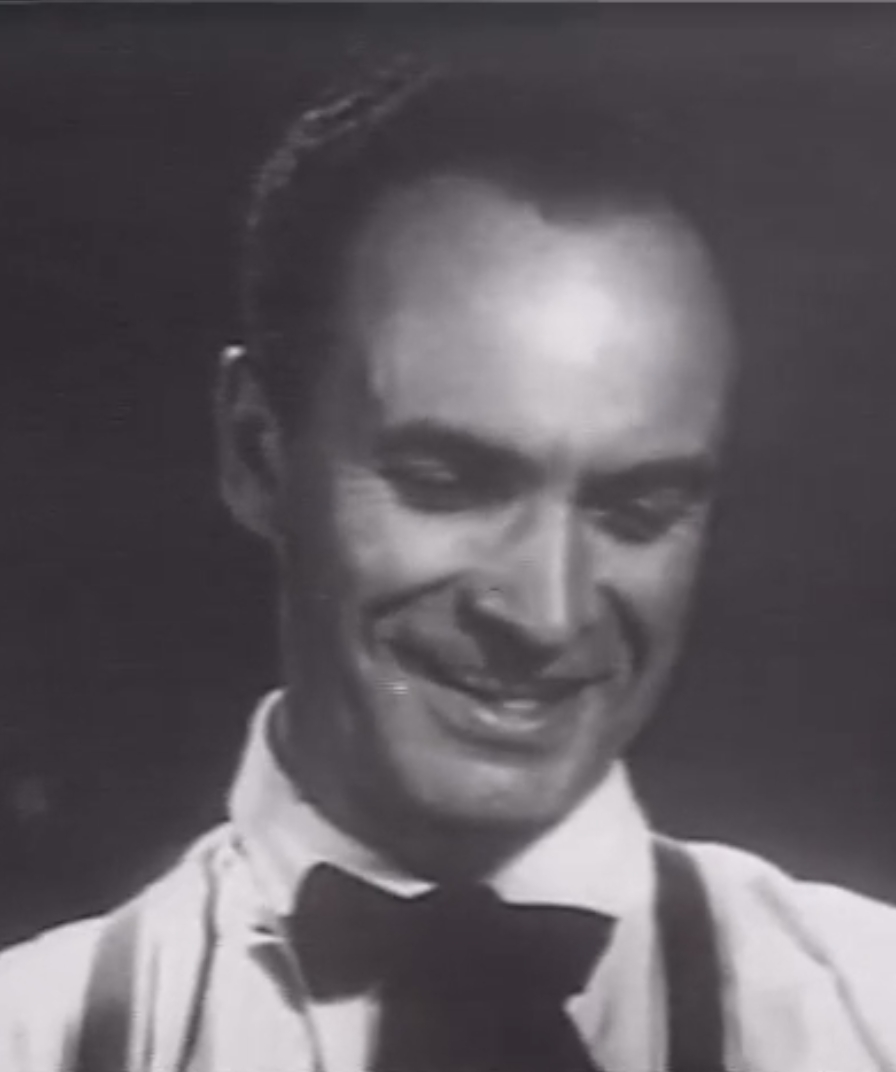
- Gaye in Seven Doors to Death (1944)
- Born: Grigory Grigorievich Ge; October 10, 1900; St. Petersburg, Russian Empire
- Died: August 23, 1993 (aged 92); Los Angeles, California, U.S.
- Occupation: Actor
- Years active: 1928–1979
- Spouse: Frances Lee (m. 1944; died 1985)
- Relatives: Nikolai Ge (great-uncle); George Gaynes (nephew); Allyn Ann McLerie (niece-by-marriage)

Grigory Grigorievich Ge (Russian: Григорий Григорьевич Ге; October 10, 1900 – August 23, 1993), known as Gregory Gaye, was a Russian-American actor. He began his stage career in Europe and in the Orient before going to the United States after the Russian Revolution in 1923. He appeared in small roles in over a hundred movies.

== Early life ==
Gaye was born Grigory Grigorievich Ge in Saint Petersburg in 1900. He shared the same name as his father, a stage actor at the Alexandrinsky Theatre. His mother, Anna Ivanovna Ge (née Novikova), was also a performer at the Alexandrinsky. The family's surname derived from the French toponym 'de Gaye', via his great-great-grandfather, a French nobleman, who immigrated to Russia during the 18th century. Gaye's great-uncle was the painter Nikolai Ge.

Gaye was originally a cadet in the Imperial Russian Navy, but decided to take up acting. After the Russian Civil War, he emigrated to the United States.

== Career ==
His first role was a bit part in the 1928 John Barrymore silent film Tempest, set during the Russian Revolution. His first credited role was as Prince Ordinsky in the 1929 Will Rogers comedy They Had to See Paris. Gaye appeared in three of Rogers' movies including; Young as You Feel and Handy Andy.

Later in 1929, Gaye received a bit part in the John Ford film The Black Watch starring Victor McLaglen (John Wayne and Randolph Scott also had bit parts in this movie). In 1930, Gaye received a good role as Baslikoff, a suave violinist, chasing Gloria Swanson in the romance comedy What a Widow! Later that year, he appeared as Vologuine in the Victor Fleming film Renegades with Myrna Loy and Bela Lugosi. In 1932, Gaye played Rudolph Kammerling in the comedy Once in a Lifetime about a Hollywood studio during the transition from silents to talkies.

In 1934, Gaye played Mr. Kolinoff in Warner Bros.'s British Agent starring Leslie Howard. Two years later, Gaye received a good role as Baron Kurt Von Obersdorf in Dodsworth starring Walter Huston and Mary Astor. Later that year, again playing an aristocrat, as Count Raul Du Rienne in Under Your Spell. Also in 1936, he received another good role as Enrico Borelli in the mystery Charlie Chan at the Opera starring Boris Karloff.

In 1937, Gaye portrayed a pianist named Dmitri 'Didi' Shekoladnikoff in the comedy Mama Steps Out starring Guy Kibbee. Next, Gaye played a German Captain Freymann in Lancer Spy starring George Sanders and Peter Lorre. Gaye continued to play the role of aristocrats like Count Frederic Brekenski in Warner Bros.'s Tovarich starring Claudette Colbert, Charles Boyer and Basil Rathbone. The following year, Gaye played another aristocratic count in Love, Honor and Behave starring Priscilla Lane. Later that year, Gaye received the part of Popoff in the comedy Too Hot to Handle starring Clark Gable and Myrna Loy.

Gaye, in a role he was getting used to, played Count Georges De Remi in Paris Honeymoon starring Bing Crosby in 1939. Later that year, he played Vitray in 20th Century Fox's The Three Musketeers starring Don Ameche. Next that year, Gaye received a good part as exiled Count Alexis Rakonin, the waiter, in Metro-Goldwyn-Mayer's Oscar-nominated classic Ninotchka starring Greta Garbo.

As World War II raged in Europe, Gaye's parts started to move away from aristocrats and toward Nazis. In 1941, Gaye played Von Mueller in They Dare Not Love starring George Brent and Paul Lukas. The movie takes place in Austria during the war. Next, he played a waiter in I Wake Up Screaming starring Betty Grable and Victor Mature. Next he played Becker in the war drama Flight Lieutenant starring Pat O'Brien and Glenn Ford.

In 1942, Gaye played a Nazi spy and saboteur named Feldon in Columbia's spy serial Secret Code. Next, he played a Nazi named Karl in the comedy Fall In.

Later in 1942, at age 41, he landed a small role in Casablanca as an official of Hitler's Reichsbank. In the movie, he tries to gain entrance to the back-room casino, but is stopped by Abdul (Dan Seymour). He tells Rick, "I have been in every gambling room between Honolulu and Berlin, and if you think I'm going to be kept out of a saloon like this, you're very much mistaken." Rick tells him, "your cash is good at the bar." He responds, "What? Do you know who I am?" To which Rick replies, "I do, you're lucky the bar is open to you." Gaye angrily responds, "This is outrageous! I shall report it to the Angrif" and storms away.

After Casablanca, Gaye received many small, and mostly uncredited roles throughout the 1940s and 1950s. In 1944, he received a bit part as a Russian correspondent Peter Voroshevski, who again is stopped at the door and not allowed in the trial, in The Purple Heart starring Dana Andrews and Richard Conte, based on the captured pilots from the Doolittle Raid over Tokyo. In the mystery Seven Doors to Death, Gaye received a large part as Henry Gregor. Later in 1944, he appeared in the spy thriller The Conspirators.

In 1945, Gaye appeared in seven movies. One of them was a war drama, Paris Underground, about two women trying to help downed Allied pilots escape Nazi-occupied France. He also played the part of Joe Sapphire in a small crime drama The Tiger Woman. In another, he again plays a German banker, this time in Cornered, starring Dick Powell.

After that year, the roles became scarcer. In 1946, Gaye received a role in a small mystery Passkey to Danger. The following year, he played a book forger in the mystery The Trespasser, starring Dale Evans. Next, he received a bit part as a Maitre d'hotel in the comedy The Bachelor and the Bobby-Soxer, starring Cary Grant.

Gaye continued to land parts into the 1950s. He got a small role in Cargo to Capetown, starring Broderick Crawford. He also received a part in Republic's science-fiction serial Flying Disc Man from Mars (it was released as a feature film called Missile Monsters in 1958). He appeared in the adventure film Mask of the Avenger, starring Anthony Quinn. This was followed with an appearance in the thriller Peking Express. Next was a part as Ali in Columbia's The Magic Carpet, starring Lucille Ball. In 1952, he appeared as Paul Shushaldin in Raoul Walsh's historical adventure The World in His Arms, starring Gregory Peck and Ann Blyth. The following year, he appeared in Savage Mutiny, starring Johnny Weissmuller (one of two movies they appeared in together). Later, he got a small role in South Sea Woman, starring Burt Lancaster and Virginia Mayo. In 1955, Gaye portrayed an ex-Nazi mad scientist who teams up with a mobster to bring dead gangsters to life in Columbia's science-fiction B horror movie Creature with the Atom Brain. Gaye appeared in Kelly and Me, starring Van Johnson, in 1957 and the following year as Vladimir Klinkoff in Auntie Mame, starring Rosalind Russell. He also played "The Ruler" in the Republic Films serial Commando Cody: Sky Marshal of the Universe.

In 1960, he played a casino owner named Freeman in Ocean's Eleven, starring Frank Sinatra, Dean Martin and Sammy Davis Jr. The following year, he played Joan Blackman's father, Elvis Presley's co-star in Blue Hawaii.

In 1962, he portrayed a salesman in Vincente Minnelli's World War II drama The Four Horsemen of the Apocalypse, starring Glenn Ford, Paul Lukas and Charles Boyer. Later that year, Gaye appeared as General Erwin Rommel in Hitler, starring Richard Basehart in the title role. The next year, he played a Russian reporter in The Prize, starring Paul Newman and Edward G. Robinson.

It would be three years before Gaye got another role. He had a small role portraying the Soviet U.N. ambassador in Batman in 1966. Three years after that in 1969, he received his next part, a small uncredited role in the Alfred Hitchcock thriller Topaz.

Gaye did not appear in any more movies until the late 1970s. He appeared in a couple of television movies before, at age 79, he did his last movie, the science-fiction disaster film Meteor where he had a small role as the Soviet Premier in 1979.

Gaye also performed on television. In 1953, he played the evil ruler who tries to destroy the earth in the television series Commando Cody: Sky Marshal of the Universe. Between 1954 and 1970, Gaye appeared as a guest on a number of television shows, including five guest appearances on The F.B.I.

== Personal life ==
Gaye was the uncle of actor George Gaynes.

=== Death ===
Gaye died in 1993 in Studio City, California, aged 92. He was predeceased, in 1985, by his second wife, Frances Lee, whom he had married in 1944. He was cremated and his ashes are held privately.

== Selected filmography ==
- Tempest (1928) - Unconfirmed Role (uncredited)
- The Case of Lena Smith (1929) - (uncredited)
- The Black Watch (1929) - 42nd Highlander (uncredited)
- They Had to See Paris (1929) - Prince Ordinsky (uncredited)
- High Society Blues (1930) - Count Prunier
- Song of the Flame (1930) - (uncredited)
- What a Widow! (1930) - Baslikoff
- Renegades (1930) - Dmitri Vologuine
- Kept Husbands (1931) - Mons. Prinz (uncredited)
- Young as You Feel (1931) - Pierre
- Once in a Lifetime (1932) - Rudolph Kammerling
- Affairs of a Gentleman (1934) - Bela (uncredited)
- Handy Andy (1934) - Pierre Martel
- British Agent (1934) - Mr. Kolinoff
- Hollywood Boulevard (1936) - Russian Writer (uncredited)
- Dodsworth (1936) - Baron Kurt Von Obersdorf
- Under Your Spell (1936) - Count Raul Du Rienne
- Charlie Chan at the Opera (1936) - Enrico Barelli
- That Girl from Paris (1936) - Paul Joseph DeVry (uncredited)
- Mama Steps Out (1937) - Dmitri 'Didi' Shekoladnikoff, the Pianist
- Lancer Spy (1937) - Capt. Freymann
- First Lady (1937) - Gregoravitch
- Prescription for Romance (1937) - Dr. Paul Azarny
- Tovarich (1937) - Count Frederic Brekenski
- Wise Girl (1937) - Prince Leopold
- Love, Honor and Behave (1938) - Count Humbert
- Bulldog Drummond's Peril (1938) - Raoul (uncredited)
- Test Pilot (1938) - Grant (uncredited)
- Too Hot to Handle (1938) - 'Popoff'
- Straight, Place and Show (1938) - Vladimir Borokov - Russian Jockey
- Thanks for Everything (1938) - Ambassador
- Paris Honeymoon (1939) - Count Georges De Remi
- The Three Musketeers (1939) - Vitray
- Hotel for Women (1939) - Fernando Manfredi (uncredited)
- Ninotchka (1939) - Count Alexis Rakonin
- On Your Toes (1939) - Vassilly - Slave in Ballet (uncredited)
- The Man from Dakota (1940) - Col. Borodin (scenes deleted)
- Down Argentine Way (1940) - Sebastian
- They Dare Not Love (1941) - Von Mueller (uncredited)
- I Wake Up Screaming (1941) - Headwaiter
- My Gal Sal (1942) - Monsieur Garnier
- Flight Lieutenant (1942) - Becker (uncredited)
- The Secret Code (1942) - Nazi Agent Feldon
- Fall In (1942) - Karl, Nazi Wiretapper (uncredited)
- Casablanca (1942) - German Banker Refused by Rick (uncredited)
- One Dangerous Night (1943) - Dr. Eric Budenny
- Song of Russia (1944) - Russian Radio Announcer (uncredited)
- The Purple Heart (1944) - Peter Voshenksy (uncredited)
- Seven Doors to Death (1944) - Henry Gregor
- The Conspirators (1944) - Antone Wynat (uncredited)
- A Song to Remember (1945) - Young Russian (uncredited)
- I Love a Mystery (1945) - Dr. Han (uncredited)
- Blood on the Sun (1945) - American Newspaperman Bogardis (uncredited)
- Paris Underground (1945) - Tissier
- Pursuit to Algiers (1945) - Ravez (uncredited)
- The Tiger Woman (1945) - Joe Sapphire
- Cornered (1945) - Perchon, Belgian Banker
- Passkey to Danger (1946) - Mr. Warren
- So Dark the Night (1946) - Commissioner Grande
- The Corpse Came C.O.D. (1947) - Director (uncredited)
- The Trespasser (1947) - Mr. E. Charles, Book Forger
- The Bachelor and the Bobby-Soxer (1947) - Maitre d'Hotel (as Gregory Gay)
- Blackmail (1947) - Jervis
- The Unfinished Dance (1947) - Jacques Lacoste
- Black Magic (1949) - Chambord / Monk
- Dancing in the Dark (1949) - Headwaiter (uncredited)
- Harbor of Missing Men (1950) - Captain Koretsky
- Cargo to Capetown (1950) - Kroll, Second Mate (uncredited)
- Flying Disc Man from Mars (1950) - Mota
- Counterspy Meets Scotland Yard (1950) - Professor Schuman
- When the Redskins Rode (1951) - St. Pierre (uncredited)
- Mask of the Avenger (1951) - Col. von Falker (uncredited)
- Peking Express (1951) - Stanislaus
- The Whip Hand (1951) - Sweitart (uncredited)
- The Magic Carpet (1951) - Caliph Ali
- Ten Tall Men (1951) - Major Berthot (uncredited)
- Bal Tabarin (1952) - Jean Dufar
- The World in His Arms (1952) - Colonel Paul Shushaldin
- Washington Story (1952) - News Agency Rep on Phone (uncredited)
- Last Train from Bombay (1952) - B. Vornin aka The Lame One
- Savage Mutiny (1953) - Carl Kroman
- Rogue's March (1953) - Russian Spy Chief (uncredited)
- The Juggler (1953) - Harry (uncredited)
- Remains to Be Seen (1953) - Headwaiter (uncredited)
- South Sea Woman (1953) - Free French Man (uncredited)
- Flame of Calcutta (1953) - Amir Khasid
- Charge of the Lancers (1954) - Cpl. Bonikoff
- Jungle Man-Eaters (1954) - Leroux
- The Gambler from Natchez (1954) - LeClerc (uncredited)
- Wiegenlied (1955) - Herr Sokolov
- Jump Into Hell (1955) - Lt. Col. Cartier (uncredited)
- King of the Carnival (1955) - Zorn
- Creature with the Atom Brain (1955) - Dr. Wilhelm Steigg
- The Eddy Duchin Story (1956) - Philip
- Kelly and Me (1957) - Milo
- Bailout at 43,000 (1957) - Dr. Franz Gruener
- Silk Stockings (1957) - Soviet Civilian (uncredited)
- Auntie Mame (1958) - Vladimir Klinkoff (uncredited)
- Judgment at Nuremberg (1959) - Friederich Hoffstetter
- Cash McCall (1960) - Dr. Bergmann (uncredited)
- Ocean's 11 (1960) - Freeman - Casino Owner (uncredited)
- Sea Hunt (1961) - Season 4, Episode 8
- Blue Hawaii (1961) - Paul Duval (uncredited)
- Four Horsemen of the Apocalypse (1962) - Salesman (uncredited)
- Hitler (1962) - Field Marshal Erwin Rommel
- The Prize (1963) - Russian Reporter (uncredited)
- Kisses for My President (1964) - Nicolai Wotomkyitch (uncredited)
- Batman (1966) - Soviet Delegate (uncredited)
- Topaz (1969) - Meeting Co-Ordinator (uncredited)
- Meteor (1979) - Russian Premier (final film role)
