= Harbor of Missing Men =

1950 film by R. G. Springsteen

- Theatrical release poster
- Directed by: R. G. Springsteen
- Screenplay by: John K. Butler
- Produced by: Sidney Picker
- Starring: Richard Denning; Barbra Fuller; Steven Geray; Aline Towne; Percy Helton; George Zucco
- Cinematography: John MacBurnie
- Edited by: Arthur Roberts
- Music by: Stanley Wilson
- Production company: Republic Pictures
- Distributed by: Republic Pictures
- Release date: March 26, 1950
- Running time: 60 minutes
- Country: United States
- Language: English

Harbor of Missing Men is a 1950 American action film directed by R. G. Springsteen and written by John K. Butler. The film stars Richard Denning, Barbra Fuller, Steven Geray, Aline Towne, Percy Helton and George Zucco. The film was released on March 26, 1950 by Republic Pictures.

== Cast ==
- Richard Denning as Jim 'Brooklyn' Gannon
- Barbra Fuller as Mae Leggett / Miss Higgins
- Steven Geray as Captain Corcoris
- Aline Towne as Angelike Corcoris
- Percy Helton as 'Rummy' Davis
- George Zucco as H.G. Danziger
- Paul Marion as Philip Corcoris
- Ray Teal as Frank Leggett
- Robert Osterloh as Johnny
- Fernanda Eliscu as Mama Corcoris
- Gregory Gaye as Captain Koretsky
- Jimmy Kelly as Carl Corcoris
- Barbara Stanley as Leodora
- Neyle Morrow as Christopher Corcoris
- Charles La Torre as John
