= Winterset (film) =

1936 film

- DVD cover
- Directed by: Alfred Santell
- Screenplay by: Anthony Veiller
- Based on: Winterset by Maxwell Anderson
- Produced by: Pandro S. Berman
- Starring: Burgess Meredith; Margo; Eduardo Ciannelli; John Carradine; Edward Ellis
- Cinematography: J. Peverell Marley
- Edited by: William Hamilton
- Music by: Nathaniel Shilkret(uncredited)
- Distributed by: RKO Radio Pictures
- Release date: November 20, 1936
- Running time: 77 minutes
- Country: United States
- Language: English
- Budget: $407,000
- Box office: $682,000

Winterset is a 1936 American crime film directed by Alfred Santell, based on the 1935 play of the same name by Maxwell Anderson, in a loose dramatization of the Sacco and Vanzetti trial and execution in 1928. The script retains elements of the blank verse poetic meter on which Anderson based his 1935 Winterset Broadway theater production.

Actor Burgess Meredith made his credited film debut as the avenging son Mio Romagna.

The film greatly changes the ending of the play, in which the lovers Mio and Miriamne are shot to death by gangsters. In the film, the two are cornered, but Mio deliberately causes a commotion by loudly playing a nearby abandoned hurdy-gurdy and deliberately causing himself and Miriamne to be arrested, thus placing them out of reach from the gangsters. The film made a loss of $2,000.

== Cast ==
- Burgess Meredith as Mio Romagna
- Margo as Miriamne Esdras
- Eduardo Ciannelli as Trock Estrella
- Maurice Moscovitch as Esdras
- Paul Guilfoyle as Garth Esdras
- Edward Ellis as Judge Gaunt
- Stanley Ridges as Shadow
- Mischa Auer as A radical
- Willard Robertson as Policeman
- Alec Craig as Oak
- John Carradine as Bartolomeo Romagna
- Myron McCormick as Carr
- Helen Jerome Eddy as Maria Romagna
- Barbara Pepper as a girl
- Fernanda Eliscu as Piny
- Lucille Ball as a girl (uncredited)

== Reception ==
Writing for The Spectator in 1937, Graham Greene gave the film a good review, noting that "this play (in the original it was in blank verse) has [...] solid merits". Despite its genre, Greene commented that "there are situations [...] which have more intensity than mere 'thriller' stuff". He praised the "evil magnificence" of Ciannelli's acting as Trock, pointing out that "here, as in all good plays, it is in the acts themselves, as much as in the dialogue, that the poetic idea is expressed."

=== Awards ===
The film was nominated for two Academy Awards, one for Best Art Direction by Perry Ferguson and the other for Original Score by Nathaniel Shilkret.
