= Passkey to Danger =

1946 film by Lesley Selander

- Theatrical release poster
- Directed by: Lesley Selander
- Screenplay by: O'Leta Rhinehart; William Hagens
- Produced by: William J. O'Sullivan
- Starring: Kane Richmond; Stephanie Bachelor; Adele Mara; Gregory Gaye; Gerald Mohr; John Eldredge
- Cinematography: William Bradford
- Edited by: Harry Keller
- Music by: Mort Glickman
- Production company: Republic Pictures
- Distributed by: Republic Pictures
- Release date: May 11, 1946
- Running time: 58 minutes
- Country: United States
- Language: English

Passkey to Danger is a 1946 American film noir crime film directed by Lesley Selander and written by O'Leta Rhinehart and William Hagens. The film stars Kane Richmond, Stephanie Bachelor, Adele Mara, Gregory Gaye, Gerald Mohr and John Eldredge. It was released on May 11, 1946 by Republic Pictures.

== Plot ==
Tex Hanlon is in charge of a wildly successful and mysterious advertising campaign for the Three Springs. People everywhere are curious what the ads are selling, and even Malcolm Tauber, the head of the Hanlon's company, is in the dark. Tauber's assistant (and Hanlon's girlfriend) Gwen Hughes has created some secret women's fashion sketches for Tex that will be used in the final Three Springs ad.

Attracted by the attention given the campaign, Renee Beauchamps asks for a chance to work with Hanlon. He agrees, but begins to receive threatening notes related to the Three Springs. A passing motorist, Julian Leighton, picks him up and offers him $20,000 to spill the secret. Another wealthy man, Alexander Cardovsky, also asks for information. He is later pressured by two thugs, Mr. Warren and Bert, to reveal everything. He buys a toy puppet from a poor woman, Jenny, and finds a note in the toy asking him to meet her. When he does, he discovers that Jenny has been murdered, and he has been set up to take the blame. However, Gwen can vouch for Hanlon's whereabouts at the time of the murder.

The next day, Tauber is eager to run the final Three Springs ad. He becomes upset when Hanlon balks, but is grateful that Hanlon did not mention the campaign to the police. Hanlon tells Gwen that they need to delay because he needs answers to force the criminals out in the open. Gwen convinces him otherwise and arranges to have the final proofs rushed from the printers that evening. Hanlon discovers that Renee has been writing the threatening notes, and she claims that she hoped to frighten him into working with her. Renee says that she is being followed and must speak with him later. Gwen sees Renee kiss Hanlon goodbye and is furious.

Immediately afterward, Special Detective Bates explains to Hanlon that the three Spring brothers, criminals who made off with millions 20 years ago and disappeared, likely believe that Hanlon is about to expose them. Hanlon agrees to work with Bates. Later, Gwen has forgiven Hanlon and is waiting for him at his apartment with Warren and Bert, not realizing who they really are. Warren and Bert threaten to pin another murder on Hanlon if he refuses to divulge his information, and Hanlon discovers that they have already murdered Renee and hidden her body in the room. When Hanlon refuses to give in, Bert violently beats him. Gwen must promise to reveal the proofs of the Three Springs campaign later that evening to save Hanlon.

At Hanlon's office, it is revealed that Cardovsky and Leighton are two of the Spring brothers. Hanlon believes that the third brother is Warren, but at gunpoint, he discovers that it is Tauber. Warren had helped two of brothers escape from prison. Gwen and Bates arrive with the police to arrest all five criminals, but Bates allows Hanlon to have one last fistfight with Bert before taking Bert and his cohorts to jail.

== Cast ==
- Kane Richmond as Tex Hanlon
- Stephanie Bachelor as Gwen Hughes
- Adele Mara as Renee Beauchamps
- Gregory Gaye as Mr. Warren
- Gerald Mohr as Malcolm Tauber
- John Eldredge as Alexander Cardovsky
- George J. Lewis as Julian Leighton
- Fred Graham as Bert
- Tom London as Gerald Bates
- Donia Bussey as Jenny
- Charles Williams as Mr. Williams
- Charles C. Wilson as Police Sergeant
