= Clarence Lung =

American actor

- Clarence Lung in Operation Petticoat 1959
- Born: October 20, 1914; Idaho, U.S.
- Died: October 15, 1993 (aged 78)
- Occupation: Actor
- Years active: 1937–1972

Clarence Lung (October 20, 1914 – October 15, 1993) was a film and television actor. He appeared in films such as Dragon Seed, Song of the Sarong, Experiment in Terror, Prisoner Of War, Operation Petticoat, China and The Hundred Days of the Dragon. Among the television programs he appeared in were Secret Agent X-9 and China Smith.

== Biography ==
Lung was born in Idaho to George Lung and Lillian Pfeiffer. His parents divorced when he was young, and he grew up in Colorado with his mother and sister.

Lung's television credits include Guys Like O'Malley, a story about an observation post during the Korean war, in which he appeared along with James Best and Neville Brand. In film, one of his early roles was a small part in The Good Earth. Later he played Attorney Yung in Experiment in Terror, a film that starred Glenn Ford and Lee Remick. He had a supporting role in Dragon Seed that starred Katharine Hepburn. In that film, he had the distinction of being the only American actor of Chinese descent to play an adult member of the Tan family and have screen credit. He appeared alongside John Lupton and James Hong in the 1959 film Blood and Steel.

Later on, he ran one of actor Benson Fong's Ah Fong restaurants in Los Angeles County.

== Filmography ==
Year	Title	Role	Notes
1937	The Good Earth		Uncredited
1943	China	Guerrilla	Uncredited
1943	Gung Ho!	Japanese Officer	Uncredited
1944	The Fighting Seabees	Japanese Officer	Uncredited
1944	The Purple Heart	Japanese Lieutenant	Uncredited
1944	Dragon Seed	Fourth Cousin	
1944	The Keys of the Kingdom	Orderly	Uncredited
1945	God Is My Co-Pilot	Chinese Civilian	Uncredited
1945	Song of the Sarong	Leader	Uncredited
1945	Secret Agent X-9	Takahari	Serial
1945	First Yank Into Tokyo	Major Ichibo	
1945	Prison Ship	Japanese Radio Officer	Uncredited
1946	Lost City of the Jungle	Chief Tonga	Serial, [Chs. 11-12]
1953	Forbidden	Waiter	Uncredited
1954	World for Ransom	Johnny Chan	
1954	Prisoner Of War	MVD Officer	
1956	The Rawhide Years	Chinese Steward	Uncredited
1959	Operation Petticoat	Sgt. Ramon Gillardo	
1959	Never So Few	Scout	Uncredited
1959	Blood and Steel	Japanese Soldier	
1960	Walk Like a Dragon	Eurasian	Uncredited
1961	Bachelor in Paradise	Bartender	Uncredited
1961	Blue Hawaii	Lonnie, Bartender	Uncredited
1962	Experiment in Terror	Attorney Yung	Uncredited
1970	Which Way to the Front?	Japanese Naval Officer	Uncredited

== Links ==
- Clarence Lung at IMDb
- Clarence Lung at Aveleyman
