= The Magic Carpet =

1951 film by Lew Landers

- Theatrical release poster
- Directed by: Lew Landers
- Screenplay by: David Mathews
- Produced by: Sam Katzman
- Starring: Lucille Ball; John Agar; Patricia Medina; George Tobias; Raymond Burr; Gregory Gaye; Rick Vallin; Gary Klein
- Cinematography: Ellis W. Carter
- Edited by: Edwin H. Bryant
- Music by: Arthur Morton
- Production companies: The Katzman Corporation; Esskay Pictures Corporation
- Distributed by: Columbia Pictures
- Release date: October 18, 1951 (Los Angeles)
- Running time: 84 minutes
- Country: United States
- Language: English

The Magic Carpet is a 1951 American SuperCinecolor adventure film directed by Lew Landers, written by David Mathews and starring stars Lucille Ball, John Agar and Patricia Medina. It was released on October 18, 1951 by Columbia Pictures, three days after Ball's I Love Lucy premiered on television.

== Plot ==
Omar, a caliph, and Yazmina, a queen, arrange their infant son Ramoth's escape when rival Ali moves to forcibly overthrow them. Before they are slain, they ensure that the baby, his locket and magic carpet are kept in the safe hands of Ahkmid, an uncle and physician who raises Ramoth to manhood.

Ramoth, unaware that he is the rightful heir but disapproving of Ali's tyranny, disguises himself as the Scarlet Falcon and, assisted by his friend Razi and Razi's beautiful sister Lida, attempts to disrupt the caliph's reign. The evil Boreg becomes his nemesis, as does Narah, a princess who is the sister of Ali.

Ahkmid, mortally wounded by Boreg, reveals his true identity to Ramoth. Lida endeavors to infiltrate Ali's forces by disguising herself as a dancer, but she is caught and imprisoned. Ramoth is also taken prisoner, but Lida escapes and sends the magic carpet to rescue Ramoth in the nick of time. Ali is killed and Narah is placed in a dungeon as Ramoth and Lida fly away on the carpet to begin a new life.

== Cast ==
- Lucille Ball as Princess Narah
- John Agar as Abdullah al Husan / Dr. Ramoth / The Scarlet Falcon
- Patricia Medina as Lida
- George Tobias as Razi
- Raymond Burr as Grand Vizier Boreg al Buzzar
- Gregory Gaye as Caliph Ali
- Rick Vallin as Abdul
- Jo Gilbert as Maras
- Gary Klein as Baby

== Release ==
The Magic Carpet opened in Los Angeles on October 18, 1951 as the second feature to Saturday's Hero. It was not shown in any Manhattan theaters, as its sole engagement in the New York area was in Brooklyn.

== Reception ==
In a contemporary review for the New York Daily News, critic Seraphina Alaimo wrote: "All this makes for pretty dull fare and not very original at that."
