= Big City (1948 film) =

1948 film by Norman Taurog

- Directed by: Norman Taurog
- Screenplay by: Anne Morrison Chapin; Whitfield Cook; Aben Kandel (additional dialogue); Nanette Kutner (adaptation)
- Story by: Miklos Laszlo
- Produced by: Joe Pasternak
- Starring: Margaret O'Brien; Robert Preston; Danny Thomas; George Murphy; Betty Garrett; Edward Arnold
- Cinematography: Robert Surtees
- Edited by: Gene Ruggiero
- Music by: Lothar Perl; Albert Sendrey; George Stoll
- Production company: Metro-Goldwyn-Mayer
- Distributed by: Loew's Inc.
- Release date: March 25, 1948
- Running time: 103 minutes
- Country: United States
- Language: English
- Budget: $1,725,000
- Box office: $1,399,000

Big City is a 1948 American drama film directed by Norman Taurog and starring Margaret O'Brien, Robert Preston and Danny Thomas.

== Plot ==
An abandoned infant is discovered in New York City by a cantor, David Feldman, and a minister, Rev. Phillip Andrews, who consult police officer Pat O'Donnell about what to do. Taking in the baby girl and naming her Midge, the three unmarried men seek legal custody in the courtroom of Judge Martin O. Abercrombie, who is agreeable on one condition—the first man to marry will become sole legal guardian of the girl.

At school after she's a few years older, Midge is teased by others for her unusual family situation. Even her teacher, Florence Barrett, does not approve of a child being raised without a mother. To alleviate her concerns, the men invite Florence to an evening at their home, where even Midge becomes happier about the way she is being brought up.

David falls in love with Florence and hopes to propose marriage. Pat, who has been seeing the extroverted singer "Shoo Shoo" Grady, elopes with her. The two clergymen are unsure that Shoo Shoo would be a proper parent for their child. It is left up to the judge, who gives careful consideration to everyone's concerns, then solves the problem by withdrawing his condition about marriage, permitting all three men to share fatherly responsibilities to Midge equally.

== Cast ==
- Margaret O'Brien as Midge
- Robert Preston as Rev. Andrews
- Danny Thomas as Cantor Feldman
- George Murphy as Pat O'Donnell
- Karin Booth as Florence Bartlett
- Edward Arnold as Judge Abercrombie
- Butch Jenkins as Lewis Keller
- Betty Garrett as "Shoo Shoo" Grady
- Lotte Lehmann as Mama Feldman
- Stanley Blystone as Mike (uncredited)
- Heinie Conklin as Barfly (uncredited)
- Frank Mayo as Lawyer (uncredited)

== Reception ==
According to MGM records the movie was not a hit, earning $910,000 in the US and Canada and $489,000 elsewhere, making a loss to the studio of $850,000.
