= The Cariboo Trail =

1950 film by Edwin L. Marin

- Theatrical release poster
- Directed by: Edwin L. Marin (as Edwin L.Marin)
- Screenplay by: Frank Gruber
- Story by: John Rhodes Sturdy
- Produced by: Nat Holt
- Starring: Randolph Scott
- Cinematography: Fred Jackman Jr.
- Edited by: Philip Martin
- Music by: Paul Sawtell
- Color process: Cinecolor
- Production company: Nat Holt Productions
- Distributed by: 20th Century Fox
- Release date: August 1, 1950
- Running time: 81 minutes
- Country: United States
- Language: English

The Cariboo Trail is a 1950 American Western film directed by Edwin L. Marin and starring Randolph Scott. Set during the Cariboo Gold Rush, the film is about an American cattle herder (Scott) looking to raise cattle in the Cariboo region of British Columbia, but comes into conflict with a local businessman (Jory).

It was the final film appearance of George "Gabby" Hayes before his death on February 9, 1969.

== Plot ==
Montanans Jim Redfern and Mike Evans head into Canada's British Columbia via the Cariboo Trail intent on raising cattle and digging for gold but find trouble instead.

== Cast ==
- Randolph Scott as Jim Redfern
- George "Gabby" Hayes as Oscar aka Grizzly
- Bill Williams as Mike Evans
- Karin Booth as Frances Harrison
- Victor Jory as Frank Walsh
- Douglas Kennedy as Murphy
- Jim Davis as Bill Miller
- Dale Robertson as Will Gray
- Mary Stuart as Jane Winters
- James Griffith as Higgins
- Lee Tung Foo as Ling
- Tony Hughes as Dr. John S. Rhodes
- Mary Kent as Mrs. Martha Winters
- Ray Hyke as Jones
- Jerry Root as Jenkins
- Cliff Clark as Assayer
- Tom Monroe as Bartender
- Fred Libby as Chief White Buffalo
- 'Kansas' Moehring as Stage Driver
- Dorothy Adams as Nurse
- Michael Barrett as Hotel Clerk
