= Winterset (play) =

- Original language: English
- Written by: Maxwell Anderson
- Genre: Drama

Premiere
- Date: September 25, 1935
- Place: Martin Beck Theatre; New York City, New York

Winterset is a play by Maxwell Anderson.

A verse drama written largely in poetic form, the tragedy deals indirectly with the Sacco–Vanzetti case, in which two Italian immigrants with radical political beliefs were executed. Its plot follows Mio Romagna's quest to prove his father's innocence in the years after Bartolomeo Romagna is executed for a robbery and murder that he did not commit. Mio's quest is complicated by his love for Miriamne Esdras and the difficult ethical decisions that result from his connection with her family.

A highly political play, with reflections on faith, truth, justice, love, and duty, it frequently alludes to William Shakespeare and Judaic philosophies.

The Broadway production, produced and directed by Guthrie McClintic, opened on September 25, 1935, at the Martin Beck Theatre, where it ran for 195 performances. The cast included Burgess Meredith, Margo, and Eduardo Ciannelli.

It won the first New York Drama Critics' Circle Award for Best Play (Best American Play).

Meredith, Margo, and Ciannelli were joined by John Carradine, Stanley Ridges, and Mischa Auer in the film adaptation in 1936, directed by Alfred Santell.

Anderson initially offered the play to The Group Theater with the stipulation that Meredith, a non-member, play the lead. Meredith wanted to join the group, but when asked during his interview by the three directors "do you love the Group Theater above yourself?", he said no. He was rejected, causing the playwright to withdraw his offer to the Group Theater. This incident became a source of contention among the group's actors. Members often cited it as an example of "ill-advised dogma".
