= Cripple Creek (film) =

1952 film by Ray Nazarro

- Theatrical release poster
- Directed by: Ray Nazarro
- Written by: Richard Schayer
- Produced by: Edward Small
- Starring: George Montgomery; Jerome Courtland; Karin Booth
- Cinematography: William V. Skall
- Edited by: Richard Fantl
- Music by: Mischa Bakaleinikoff
- Color process: Technicolor
- Production company: Edward Small Productions
- Distributed by: Columbia Pictures
- Release date: June 25, 1952
- Running time: 78 minutes
- Country: United States
- Language: English

Cripple Creek is a 1952 American Western film directed by Ray Nazarro, produced by Edward Small and starring George Montgomery, Jerome Courtland and Karin Booth.

== Plot ==
In 1893, outlaws are stealing high-grade ore, smelting it and plating it to resemble lead. The government sends agents Bret Ivers and Larry Galland, who arrive in Cripple Creek posing as Texas gunfighters. While their partner Strap Galland works undercover as an informant, Bret finds the smelting operation and Larry learns of the payoff. The crooked town marshal is suspicious of the men. When the men's identities are exposed, their lives are in danger.

== Cast ==
- George Montgomery as Bret Ivers
- Jerome Courtland as Larry Galland
- Richard Egan as Strap Galland alias Gillis
- Karin Booth as Julie Hanson
- William Bishop as Silver Kirby
- Don Porter as Denver Jones
- John Dehner as Emil Cabeau
- Roy Roberts as Marshal John Tetheroe
- George Cleveland as 'Hardrock' Hanson

== Production ==
Production began in mid-August 1951 and was completed by the end of the month.

== Reception ==
In a contemporary review for The Boston Globe, critic Marjory Adams wrote: "The action is fast but sometimes the situations 'are more comic strip in character than credible."

In the New York Daily News, critic Wanda Hale wrote: "This outdoor action film, neatly directed by Ray Nazarro, is lively and more suspenseful than most of its kind."

== See also ==
- List of American films of 1952
