= Seminole Uprising =

1955 film by Earl Bellamy

- Theatrical release poster
- Directed by: Earl Bellamy
- Screenplay by: Robert E. Kent
- Based on: Bugle's Wake by Curt Brandon
- Produced by: Sam Katzman
- Starring: George Montgomery
- Cinematography: Henry Freulich
- Edited by: Jerome Thoms
- Music by: Mischa Bakaleinikoff
- Color process: Technicolor
- Production company: Sam Katzman Productions
- Distributed by: Columbia Pictures
- Release date: May 1, 1955
- Running time: 72 minutes
- Country: United States
- Language: English

Seminole Uprising is a 1955 American Western film directed by Earl Bellamy and starring George Montgomery based on the 1952 novel Bugle's Wake by Curt Brandon.

== Plot ==
Set in 1855 Texas, Army Lt. Cam Elliott (George Montgomery) is detailed in capturing a tribe of Seminole Indians who have fled their Florida reservation for the Lone Star state. Arriving at the Army fort to which he has been assigned, Elliott sees Susan Hannah (Karin Booth), the fort commander's daughter, with whom he was once infatuated. Finding that she is now engaged to Capt. Dudley (Ed Hinton), the two officers soon develop a dislike for each other.

Wise to Indian ways and somewhat sympathetic to their plight, Elliott tries to avoid bloodshed and negotiate a peaceful return with Black Cat (Steven Ritch), the Seminole leader. When the unscrupulous Captain Dudley knowingly condemns Black Cat's wife and son to certain death at the hands of aggrieved ranchers who are out for revenge, Black Cat wages war, attacking the fort and taking Susan Hannah captive. Later, Black Cat's tribe attacks Elliott's detachment in the hills until they are defeated in the climactic battle scene. Black Cat surrenders and releases Hannah.

== Cast ==
- George Montgomery as 1st Lt. Cam Elliott
- Karin Booth as Susan Hannah
- William Fawcett as Cubby Crouch
- Steven Ritch as Black Cat (as Steve Ritch)
- Ed Hinton as Capt. Philip Dudley
- John Pickard as Sgt. Chris Zanoba
- Jim Maloney as Pvt. Tony Zanoba
- Rory Mallinson as Toby Wilson
- Howard Wright as Col. Hannah
- Rus Conklin as High Cloud (as Russ Conklin)
- Jonni Paris as Malawa
- Joanne Rio as Tasson Li

== Critical reception ==
Variety gave the film a tepid review, saying that it was a "fairish Western" but too formulaic to build audience interest. Montgomery gave "some credibility" to his starring role and Hinton was "suitably unpleasant" as the villainous rival, the Hollywood trade journal opined. But the film's re-use of stock battle scene footage was panned as "strictly contrived", suffering by comparison to the technicolor footage shot by cinematographer Henry Freulich. Mischa Bakaleinikoff's music was singled out for praise as a "plus contribution".

== See also ==
- List of American films of 1955
