= The Crooked Sky =

1957 British film by Henry Cass

- UK quad poster
- Directed by: Henry Cass
- Written by: Norman Hudis
- Produced by: Richard Gordon (uncredited); Bill Luckwell (Executive)
- Starring: Wayne Morris; Karin Booth; Anton Diffring
- Cinematography: Phil Grindrod
- Edited by: Peter Mayhew
- Music by: Wilfred Burns (uncredited)
- Production companies: Amalgamated Productions; Luckwin Productions
- Distributed by: Rank Film Distributors (UK)
- Release date: April 1957
- Running time: 77 minutes
- Country: United Kingdom
- Language: English

The Crooked Sky is a low budget 1957 black and white British melodrama/crime film, directed by Henry Cass and starring Wayne Morris, Anton Diffring and Karin Booth. It was written by Norman Hudis from a story by Lance Hargreaves and Maclean Rogers.

== Plot ==
American detective Mike Conlin teams up with Scotland Yard to catch the villains behind a big counterfeiting ring. After the mysterious death of an American airline radio operator, the Yard suspect the operation may originate in the United States, and Conlin is brought over to help.

In London, £500,000 in counterfeit one-pound notes has been smuggled in by Tom Alanson, an American radio engineer for a freight line flying between England and the United States. He is in a gang of smugglers but goes to Scotland Yard. However, two gang members stab him to death. Yard Inspector "Mac" MacAuley believes the forged notes come from the United States. Mac contacts the U.S. Treasury who assigns investigator Mike Conlin to the case.

Mike suspects Alanson's freight line is involved in smuggling the counterfeit currency. Subsequently, he flies to London. Mike, posing as an efficiency expert, meets radio engineer Sandra Hastings, Alanson's fiancée, and sister of Bill Hastings, another radio operator.

While searching woods near company headquarters, Mike witnesses the fatal shooting of another company employee (Wilson). After revealing his true identity to the local police inspector, who has come to investigate the murder, Mike goes to London to consult with Mac and suggests that the fake currency might have been concealed in radio equipment removed after each flight. Later, at an illegal gambling club in London, Bill introduces Sandra to Frank Fraser, the club's operator and, unknown to her, the head of the counterfeit ring.

In private, Bill, whose involvement in the ring was to earn money to start his own charter company, tells Fraser he is concerned about the recent murders. After a gambler named Smith, heavy in debt to Fraser, commits suicide, some counterfeit notes are found, along with a list of gambling clubs. The police begin to investigate Fraser while Mike continues to look for evidence.

Eventually, Bill warns Fraser about the new man, leading Fraser to assign two thugs to follow Mike. Sandra accuses Bill of being involved with Fraser's criminal activities. She also tells Mike about Fraser. Breaking into Fraser's house, Mike finds counterfeit pound notes in a desk drawer. Surprised by Fraser and his henchmen, Mike is taken to a wooded area to be killed, but he escapes.

When Fraser's girl friend, Penny, takes several bundles of counterfeit notes to buy an expensive necklace, the police are alerted. With Mac's help, Mike makes plans to round up the entire gang, and when Bill returns from the U.S., has him followed to Fraser's house. After Bill informs Fraser that the notes are still on the aircraft, Fraser is tipped off by one of his thugs that a police raid is imminent.

At gunpoint, Fraser orders Bill to take him to the air base and fly him out of the country. Upon learning that Bill did not take the notes to Fraser, Mike boards the aircraft to search for them. After the plane has taken off, Fraser shoots Mike in the shoulder, then orders Bill to fly to France, although Bill warns him that all airports will be closed to them.

Strapping on a parachute, in which the gang has been smuggling the currency, Fraser plans to jump from the aircraft and escape, unaware that the parachute has been altered to accommodate more counterfeit notes. Bill puts the aircraft on automatic pilot, and attacks Fraser who falls out of the aircraft. However, his parachute fails to open properly and he plummets to his death, whilst the counterfeit money is scattered in the air.

Back on the ground, Mike assures Sandra and Bill that, due to Bill's actions in the air that day, it is unlikely that he will be prosecuted.

== Cast ==
- Wayne Morris as Mike Conlin
- Karin Booth as Sandra Hastings
- Anton Diffring as Frank Fraser
- Bruce Seton as "Mac" MacAuley
- Sheldon Lawrence as Bill Hastings
- Richard Shaw as Williams
- Colette Bartrop as Penny
- Seymour Green as Steve
- Bill Brandon as Grange
- Reginald Hearne as Smith
- Frank Hawkins as Robson
- Murray Kash as Lewis
- Wally Peterson as Wilson
- Guy Kingsley-Poynter as Tom Alanson
- Robert Raglan as senior Civil Servant
- Robert Perceval as U.S. Treasury official
- Beryl Cooke as landlady
- Robert Hunter as manager
- Frank Henderson as salesman
- George Roderick as Inspector Hughes
- Jack Taylor as croupier
- Howard Lang as commissioner

Although named Penny in the credits, Colette Bartrop is referred to as "Colette" (her real name) in the film.

== Production ==
The Crooked Sky began principal photography on 13 August 1956 at Merton Park Studios in London. Location shots were at Blackbushe Airport.

The original cast included Tim Conway in the lead male role, who was replaced by Wayne Morris after Conway became ill. The aircraft in The Crooked Sky were:

- Avro York
- Douglas C-47 Skytrain c/n 33285/1653, s/n 44-76953, code ZU-13
- Douglas Dakota
- Handley Page Hermes
- Percival P-50 Prince c/n 46, G-AMLZ
- Percival Proctor
- Vickers Viking1B c/n 146, G-AIH

== Critical reception ==
In a contemporary review Monthly Film Bulletin said "In the line of the most conventional examples of this genre, this is a hotch-potch of familiar effects and cliches. The frightening scoundrels playing chamber music at a fashionable party, for example, too obviously recall The Ladykillers [1955]. Nor do the direction and editing do anything to mask the poverty of the script. An ageing Wayne Morris wanders through the story, apparently with no clear idea of his part in it."

In British Sound Films: The Studio Years 1928–1959 David Quinlan rated the film as "good", writing: "Patchwork of familiar crime plot elements."

The Radio Times Guide to Films gave the film 2/5 stars, writing: "Morris turns in a no-nonsense performance, but is easily upstaged by that master of menace, Anton Diffring."

TV Guide called the film an "interesting British attempt to put an American-style, hard-boiled detective in their own yard, [it] even goes as far as naming the hero 'Mike' instead of the usual 'Geoffrey' or 'Ronnie'."
