= Charge of the Lancers =

1954 film by William Castle

- Directed by: William Castle
- Screenplay by: Robert E. Kent
- Story by: Robert E. Kent
- Produced by: Sam Katzman
- Starring: Paulette Goddard; Jean-Pierre Aumont; Karin Booth
- Cinematography: Henry Freulich
- Edited by: Henry Batista
- Color process: Technicolor
- Production company: Sam Katzman Productions
- Distributed by: Columbia Pictures
- Release date: February 1954
- Running time: 74 minutes
- Country: United States
- Language: English

Charge of the Lancers is a 1954 American adventure film directed by William Castle and starring Paulette Goddard, Jean-Pierre Aumont and Karin Booth.

== Plot ==
As the Crimean War rages, British officers Captain Eric Evoir (Jean-Pierre Aumont) and Major Bruce Lindsey (Richard Wyler) are sent to Crimea to protect a top-secret cannon capable of blasting through the walls of a nearby Russian fort. Lindsey is captured by the Russians and subjected to brutal interrogation. Evoir sets out to rescue his comrade. Along the way, Evoir meets a beautiful gypsy girl (Paulette Goddard) and begins an affair as intense as the war itself.

== Cast ==
- Paulette Goddard as Tanya
- Jean-Pierre Aumont as Capt. Eric Evoir
- Richard Wyler as Maj. Bruce Lindsey
- Karin Booth as Maria Sand
- Charles Irwin as Tom Daugherty
- Ben Astar as Gen. Inderman
- Lester Matthews as Gen. Stanhope
- Gregory Gaye as Col. Bonikoff
- Ivan Triesault as Dr. Manus
- Louis Merrill as Col. Zeansky
- Tony Roux as Asa
- Fernanda Eliscu as Keta

== See also ==
- List of American films of 1954
