= Beloved Infidel =

1959 film

- Original film poster
- Directed by: Henry King
- Screenplay by: Sy Bartlett
- Based on: Beloved Infidel (1958 memoir) by Sheilah Graham; Gerold Frank
- Produced by: Jerry Wald
- Starring: Gregory Peck; Deborah Kerr; Eddie Albert
- Cinematography: Leon Shamroy
- Edited by: William H. Reynolds
- Music by: Franz Waxman
- Distributed by: 20th Century Fox
- Release date: November 17, 1959 (New York City)
- Running time: 123 minutes
- Country: United States
- Language: English
- Budget: $2,340,000

Beloved Infidel is a 1959 American DeLuxe Color biographical drama film made by 20th Century Fox in CinemaScope and based on the relationship of F. Scott Fitzgerald and Sheilah Graham. The film was directed by Henry King and produced by Jerry Wald from a screenplay by Sy Bartlett, based on the 1958 memoir by Sheilah Graham and Gerold Frank (Fitzgerald wrote Graham a poem, "For Shielah [sic], a Beloved Infidel," in which he proclaimed his gratitude for what she had learned from her previous lovers). The music score was by Franz Waxman, the cinematography by Leon Shamroy and the art direction by Lyle R. Wheeler and Maurice Ransford. The film was the sixth and final collaboration between King and Peck.

The film stars Gregory Peck and Deborah Kerr, along with Eddie Albert and Philip Ober.

== Plot ==
Sheilah Graham sails from England to the US and meets with a newspaper editor John Wheeler, telling him of her royal lineage and many connections. He hires her to write a column, and when its blunt and gossipy nature increases its popularity, Sheilah is also offered her own radio program.

She meets acclaimed author F. Scott Fitzgerald at a party at the home of humorist Bob Carter, her friend. An immediate attraction is formed, although Scott is still married to wife Zelda, who has been institutionalized in a psychiatric hospital. To meet financial obligations, Scott has accepted a position in Hollywood writing film scripts, expressing the belief that his novels are no longer of interest.

His excessive drinking affects his mood and his work. Scott is haunted by the memories of Zelda and the success and fun they had together. He learns that a play is being produced in Pasadena based on one of his stories and takes Sheilah to see it, only to discover that it is a production by high school students, some of whom are unaware that the writer is even still alive.

Sheilah copes with his growing alcoholism and tries to leave him until Scott sends a goodbye note, sounding suicidal. She confesses to him that her own past haunts her, everything she claimed to be being a lie: Sheilah actually is a girl from the London slums. (What is not in the movie, nor in Graham's memoir, is that she revealed to Fitzgerald that she was the child of Ukrainian Jews, who had fled the pogroms and emigrated to England. In the memoir, it was soon after she told him about her childhood in an orphanage that Fitzgerald sent her the "Beloved Infidel" poem. ) She appeals to Scott to write another book, but after he sends in the first four chapters, Scott receives a publisher's letter of rejection.

Sheilah's radio show is based in Chicago, and as she travels there, Scott becomes abusive, first aboard an airplane and then to one of her colleagues. What she doesn't know is that Scott has been fired by the studio, which finds his script work unacceptable. Sheilah continues to stand by him, but eventually Scott's health gives out. He collapses and dies, a forlorn figure of the past.

== Cast ==
- Gregory Peck as F. Scott Fitzgerald
- Deborah Kerr as Sheilah Graham
- Eddie Albert as Bob Carter – Sheilah's friend
- Philip Ober as John Wheeler
- Herbert Rudley as Stan Harris
- John Sutton as Lord Donegall
- Karin Booth as Pierce
- Ken Scott as Robinson
- Elliott Gould as newsboy (uncredited)
- Minta Durfee (uncredited)

== Production ==
According to Henry King, the driving force behind the project was Gregory Peck, who read the novel and wanted to play the male lead. King called the film "a failure before it started. Peck was sure it was an Academy Award part. But it was so realistic that I don't think Peck got credit for the good performance that he gave because it was such an obnoxious man, just a terrible man who dies in the end. When you kill a good man like Ronald Colman, all right. But when you take a man that the audience is glad to see dead, I don't think it works for the picture very well."

== See also ==
- List of American films of 1959
