= Juke Box Rhythm =

1959 film by Arthur Dreifuss

- Directed by: Arthur Dreifuss
- Written by: Mary C. McCall Jr. Earl Baldwin
- Produced by: Sam Katzman
- Starring: Jo Morrow; Jack Jones; Brian Donlevy; Frieda Inescort
- Cinematography: Fred Jackman
- Music by: Arthur Morton
- Production company: Columbia Pictures
- Distributed by: Columbia Pictures
- Release date: April 1, 1959
- Running time: 81 minutes
- Country: United States
- Language: English

Juke Box Rhythm is a 1959 American musical film starring Brian Donlevy and Jo Morrow.

The film was released on a double bill with The Tingler (1959).

== Plot ==
Preparing for her coronation, Princess Ann flies to New York City along with her Aunt Margaret, the countess, to do some shopping. At their hotel, in the room momentarily by herself, Ann hears music and inquires at the front desk about it. She discovers it is emanating from a college fraternity party on the hotel's fourth floor.

While listening outside, Ann is abruptly pulled into the room by Riff Manton, a college student who is also a singer. They dance together and Ann attempts to lose her inhibitions, but the impropriety of the situation compels her to leave without ever having identified herself.

Riff's father, George, is a theatrical producer. Separated from his wife of two decades, Martha, he is dating Leslie Anders, a wealthy socialite. Riff objects to this, although Leslie is offering to finance his father's next show.

Balenko, an aspiring dress designer, shows Riff a newspaper photo of him dancing with royalty and asks for an introduction to the princess. Riff is shocked to discover who she was. He is able to track her down, apologize and ingratiate himself to her. After persuading Ann to accompany him out for the evening, then scheming to ditch her disapproving chaperone Margaret, he takes her to a nightclub. The featured entertainer, George Jessel, invites the princess onto the stage, where they do a duet.

Ann is charmed by Balenko and orders 25 dresses from him. Balenko is so happy, he offers to use the money to finance Riff's father's show. An irritated Leslie ruins the tailor's reputation with the countess, who rescinds the order. Riff straightens everything out and his parents reunite. After being saddened by Princess Ann's departure, Riff then he is informed by Balenko that they both will be receiving invitations to the coronation.

== Cast ==
- Jo Morrow as Princess Ann
- Jack Jones as Riff Manton
- Brian Donlevy as George Manton
- Frieda Inescort as Countess Margaret
- Karin Booth as Leslie Anders
- Marjorie Reynolds as Martha Manton
- Hans Conried as Balenko
- George Jessel as himself

== Musical performers ==
- The Treniers
- Johnny Otis
- Earl Grant Trio
- The Nitwits (musical group)

According to media reports in Daily Variety, Bill Haley and His Comets were at one point announced as being in this film, but they do not appear.
