= State Penitentiary (film) =

1950 film by Lew Landers

- Directed by: Lew Landers
- Written by: Henry Edward Helseth
- Screenplay by: Howard J. Green; Robert Libott; Frank Burt
- Produced by: Sam Katzman
- Starring: Warner Baxter; Onslow Stevens; Karin Booth
- Narrated by: Leo Cleary
- Cinematography: Ira H. Morgan
- Edited by: James Sweeney
- Music by: Mischa Bakaleinikoff
- Production company: Sam Katzman Productions
- Distributed by: Columbia Pictures
- Release date: June 8, 1950
- Running time: 66 minutes
- Country: United States
- Language: English

State Penitentiary is a 1950 American drama film directed by Lew Landers and starring Warner Baxter (in his last film role) and Onslow Stevens. The film's prison scenes were photographed at the state penitentiary at Carson City, Nevada.

== Plot summary ==
Roger Manners, a former aircraft manufacturer, is wrongly convicted of having embezzled $400,000 and is given a long prison sentence. His wife Shirley tries to prove his innocence. Manners escapes, hoping to track down the real culprit, his former partner Stanley Brown.

== Cast ==
- Warner Baxter as Roger Manners
- Onslow Stevens as Richard Evans
- Karin Booth as Shirley Manners
- Robert Shayne as Stanley Brown
- Richard Benedict as Mike Gavin
- Brett King as Al 'Kid' Beaumont
- John Bleifer as Jailbreak Jimmy
- Leo Cleary as Warden-Narrator (as Leo T. Cleary)
- Rick Vallin as Tom – Prison Guard
- Rusty Wescoatt as 'Flash' Russell – Convict
- William Fawcett as Bill Costello – Convict
- John Hart as 'Sandy' O'Hara – Convict
- Jack Ingram as Construction Gang Guard
