= African Manhunt =

1955 film by Seymour Friedman

- Theatrical release poster
- Directed by: Seymour Friedman
- Screenplay by: Arthur Hoerl
- Produced by: Jerry Thomas
- Starring: Myron Healey; Karin Booth; John Kellogg; Lawrence Dobkin; Ross Elliott; James Edwards
- Cinematography: Carl Berger
- Edited by: Leon Barsha
- Production company: Republic Pictures
- Distributed by: Republic Pictures
- Release date: January 5, 1955
- Running time: 65 minutes
- Country: United States
- Language: English

African Manhunt is a 1955 American adventure film directed by Seymour Friedman and written by Arthur Hoerl. The film stars Myron Healey, Karin Booth, John Kellogg, Lawrence Dobkin, Ross Elliott and James Edwards. The film was released on January 5, 1955, by Republic Pictures. African sequences from the French documentary Congolaise were edited into the film.

== Plot ==
At a military outpost in Africa, Sergeant Drover (John Kellogg) kills his commanding officer, robs the camp safe and runs into the jungle.

Months later, U.S. Army Intelligence assigns Captain Kirby (Myron Healey) to investigate a message from a western doctor (Ray Bennett), who runs a medical clinic in a remote area.

Believing that the killer is hiding near the clinic, the Kirby arranges to be transported upriver to search for the murderer and return him to stand trial with Rene Carvel (Ross Elliott) of the French African Corps as his guide.

Just before they arrive, Drover guesses that the doctor has alerted authorities about his presence and murders him. He tries to kill his pursuers as well, but they capture and arrest him.

After burying the doctor and closing the clinic, the team begin the difficult journey back to the coast with Clark's assistant, Ann Davis (Karin Booth), and the handcuffed murderer. Of course, a love interest is formed between Ms. Davis and Captain Kirby and noticed by the observant French guide.

Continually looking for a way to escape, Drover is stuck riding in the canoe with Bob, Rene and several locals; however, when they stop to camp in the villages, Rene lets down his vigil. Drover kills him too and escapes.

The Captain chases him and returns him to custody after chasing off an elephant trying to charge Ms. Davis.

After burying Rene, Ms. Davis and Captain Kirby get back to the river journey with criminal in tow.

Following numerous terrain difficulties, animal attacks, and assorted "Hollywoodery", Drover manages to get himself killed and Kirby saves the girl from certain death. The locals to perform a ritual dance to celebrate and the surviving protagonists decide they will stay together when they reach their destination.

== Cast ==
- Myron Healey as Capt. Bob Kirby
- Karin Booth as Ann Davis
- John Kellogg as Sergeant Jed Drover
- Lawrence Dobkin as Commentator
- Ross Elliott as Rene Carvel
- James Edwards as Native Guide
- Ray Bennett as Dr. Clark
