= Jungle Man-Eaters =

1954 film

- Directed by: Lee Sholem
- Written by: Samuel Newman
- Based on: Jungle Jim; 1934-1954 comic strip by Don Moore and Alex Raymond
- Produced by: Sam Katzman
- Starring: Johnny Weissmuller; Karin Booth; Richard Stapley
- Cinematography: Henry Freulich
- Edited by: Gene Havlick
- Music by: Mischa Bakaleinikoff
- Production company: Sam Katzman Productions
- Distributed by: Columbia Pictures
- Release date: June 1954
- Running time: 68 minutes
- Country: United States
- Language: English

Jungle Man-Eaters is a 1954 American adventure film directed by Lee Sholem starring Johnny Weissmuller, Karin Booth and Richard Stapley. It is the last official Jungle Jim movie after Screen Gems bought the rights to make a TV series based on the character, which also starred Weissmuller. With only three movies on his contract remaining, Weissmuller used them wisely by just playing himself, but the format stayed the same. Despite the title, there are no Jungle Man-Eaters shown in the film.

== Plot ==
Jungle Jim is recruited to track down a group of French diamond smugglers who seek to alter the price of diamonds through taking over a secret diamond field. The smugglers not only murder the original owners of the diamond field but set up inter-tribal warfare to prevent any intruders from learning of the diamond field.

== Cast ==
- Johnny Weissmuller as Jungle Jim
- Karin Booth as Dr. Bonnie Crandall
- Richard Stapley as Inspector Jeffrey Bernard
- Bernie Hamilton as Zuwaba
- Gregory Gaye as Leroux
- Lester Matthews as Commissioner Kingston
- Paul Thompson as Zulu
- Vince Townsend Jr. as Chief Boganda
