= The Unfinished Dance =

1947 film by Henry Koster

- Theatrical release poster
- Directed by: Henry Koster
- Screenplay by: Myles Connolly
- Story by: Paul Morand
- Produced by: Joe Pasternak
- Starring: Margaret O'Brien; Cyd Charisse; Karin Booth
- Cinematography: Robert L. Surtees
- Edited by: Douglass Biggs
- Music by: Herbert Stothart
- Production company: Metro-Goldwyn-Mayer
- Distributed by: Loew's, Inc.
- Release date: September 19, 1947
- Running time: 101 minutes
- Country: United States
- Language: English
- Budget: $2,989,000
- Box office: $2,303,000

The Unfinished Dance is a 1947 American musical drama film directed by Henry Koster and starring Margaret O'Brien, Cyd Charisse and Karin Booth. Like the 1937 French film Ballerina, it is an adaptation of Paul Morand's "La Mort du cygne". It won two awards at the 1948 Locarno International Film Festival. Its story centers around the members of a ballet company.

== Plot ==
Aspiring young ballet student Meg Merlin lives with her aunt and idolizes Ariane Bouchet the prima ballerina of the ballet company of which the dance school forms a part. She often neglects her own studies just to watch Ariane practice. Only the intervention of her temporary guardian, the kindly clockmaker Mr Paneros (almost an uncle!), keeps her from being expelled.

When Meg learns that the "first lady of ballet," Anna 'La Darina' has been hired by the ballet company, she is livid at the idea of Ariane being side lined and upstaged. She and her best friend Josie plan to sabotage Anna's stay, beginning with mischief, like turning off the lights in the middle of a performance.

Meg is so obsessed in her infatuation with Bouchet, that she even has a pummelling and hair pulling tussle in the locker room with fellow dance student Phyllis, who dares to express her preference for Anna's talent and prestige over Ariane's. This earns Meg a formal reprimand. Later on during a prestigious performance of "Swan Lake", while intending only to switch off the house lights, Meg, in the semi darkness, accidentally instead pulls the lever operating a trap door. Anna plummets through the stage floor opening, seriously injuring her spine, and is likely never to dance again.

Phyllis is very suspicious and appears to think that Meg is responsible. Matters accelerate when Meg wins the place to partner Bouchet in the 'Butterfly' dance performance. Josie is desolate that she was not chosen and accuses Meg of having 'all the political influence'. Phyllis gradually importunes Josie and lures her away from her friendship with Meg who then becomes terrified that Josie will divulge what she knows about the accident. Worse yet, Meg discovers that Ariane is rather self-indulgent, being more concerned with her forthcoming marriage plans, even admitting her intention of abandoning her dancing career altogether. Anna, on the other hand, is generous and kind, coming back to the school, despite the effects of her injury, to advise and teach the students as best she can.

Meg becomes more and more frightened and riddled with guilt regarding Anna's plight. Mr Paneros decides to talk to Anna and inadvertently reveals Meg's involvement regarding the accident. When Anna learns the truth, she soon forgives the child. Anna visits Bouchet one morning and tells her the truth about the accident. Horrified by the revelation she returns to the ballet company and abandons her marriage plans. Meg is now absolved from her feelings of guilt and knows that she has been forgiven. The movie ends with a spirited performance of 'Holiday for Strings' where Ariane Bouchet takes the leading role, supported by the entire ballet company and the youngsters including Meg, Josie and Phyllis, who appear to have been completely reconciled. Madame Darina meanwhile, watches benignly and encouragingly from the wings and appears to have fully accepted her new position as teacher and mentor. As Mr Paneros wisely remarked earlier on, a truly 'great lady'.

== Cast ==
- Margaret O'Brien as "Meg" Merlin
- Cyd Charisse as Mlle. Ariane Bouchet
- Karin Booth as Lady Anna La Darina
- Danny Thomas as Mr. Paneros
- Esther Dale as Olga
- Thurston Hall as Mr. Ronsell
- Harry Hayden as Murphy
- Mary Eleanor Donahue as Josie
- Connie Cornell as Phyllis
- Ruth Brady as Miss Merlin
- Charles Bradstreet as Fred Carleton
- Ann Codee as Mme. Borodin
- Gregory Gay as Jacques Lacoste

== Reception ==
According to MGM records, the film earned $1,129,000 in the U.S. and Canada and $1,174,000 in other markets, but because of its high cost, it recorded a loss of $1,797,000. It was the first movie produced by Joe Pasternak at MGM to lose money.
