= The World Was His Jury =

1958 film by Fred F. Sears

- Directed by: Fred F. Sears
- Produced by: Sam Katzman
- Starring: Edmond O'Brien; Mona Freeman
- Cinematography: Benjamin H. Kline
- Edited by: Edwin H. Bryant
- Production company: Clover Productions
- Distributed by: Columbia Pictures
- Release date: January 1958
- Running time: 82 minutes
- Country: United States
- Language: English

The World Was His Jury is a 1958 American drama film directed by Fred F. Sears and starring Edmond O'Brien and Mona Freeman. It was released by Columbia Pictures.

== Plot ==
A cruise ship's captain dies and Jerry Barrett is promoted to replace him. On the way to New York City, the vessel catches fire. Barrett is knocked unconscious by falling debris, first officer Martin Ranker tries to save the ship but 162 passengers die.

Barrett is prosecuted for criminal negligence. Attorney David Carson agrees to represent him, infuriating wife Robin, who resents Carson trying to free guilty clients and declares that she is leaving him. Ranker's testimony damages Barrett and another witness insinuates the interim captain was drunk. An armed man tries to shoot Barrett in the courthouse, and a crew member discredited by Carson on the stand is later found stabbed to death.

Carson discovers that certain crewmen falsified their documents and had criminal records. Ranker, a 40-year veteran, resented being passed over for the captaincy and hired men to commit arson, never meaning the blaze to get out of control. He confesses on the stand, Robin returns to Carson and the defendant goes free.

== Cast ==
- Edmond O'Brien as David Carson
- Mona Freeman as Robin Carson
- Robert McQueeney as Barrett
- Paul Birch as Ranker
- John Beradino as Tony Arnaud
- Carlos Romero as 2nd Officer Johnson
