= Russell Kimball =

American art director

- Born: November 1, 1903; Minnesota, United States
- Died: June 29, 1979 (aged 75); Los Angeles, California, United States
- Occupation: Art director
- Years active: 1942–1969 (film & TV)

Russell Kimball (November 1, 1903 – June 29, 1979) was an American art director who worked on more than a hundred and fifty films and television series during his career.

== Selected filmography ==
- In Old California (1942)
- The Affairs of Jimmy Valentine (1942)
- The Girl from Alaska (1942)
- Moonlight Masquerade (1942)
- The Queen of Spies (1942)
- Outlaws of Pine Ridge (1942)
- Perils of Nyoka (1942)
- Call of the Canyon (1942)
- Hit Parade of 1943 (1943)
- London Blackout Murders (1943)
- The Purple V (1943)
- Hit Parade of 1943 (1943)
- The Attorney's Dilemma (1943)
- Whispering Footsteps (1943)
- Man from Music Mountain (1943)
- Mystery Broadcast (1943)
- Tahiti Honey (1943)
- Days of Old Cheyenne (1943)
- The Man from Thunder River (1943)
- Black Hills Express (1943)
- Rosie the Riveter (1944)
- Storm Over Lisbon (1944)
- Stagecoach to Monterey (1944)
- Brazil (1944)
- Lake Placid Serenade (1944)
- Earl Carroll Vanities (1945)
- A Sporting Chance (1945)
- Murder in the Music Hall (1946)
- Affairs of Geraldine (1946)
- The Pilgrim Lady (1947)
- McHale's Navy (1964)
- McHale's Navy Joins the Air Force (1965)
- Three Guns for Texas (1968)

== Bibliography ==
- Darby, William. Anthony Mann: The Film Career. McFarland, 2009.
