= The Magnificent Rogue =

1946 film by Albert S. Rogell

- Theatrical release poster
- Directed by: Albert S. Rogell
- Screenplay by: Dane Lussier; Sherman L. Lowe
- Story by: Gerald Drayson Adams; Richard Sokolove
- Produced by: William J. O'Sullivan
- Starring: Lynne Roberts; Warren Douglas; Gerald Mohr; Stephanie Bachelor; Adele Mara; Grady Sutton
- Cinematography: John Alton
- Edited by: Richard L. Van Enger
- Music by: Mort Glickman; Nathan Scott
- Production company: Republic Pictures
- Distributed by: Republic Pictures
- Release date: November 7, 1946
- Running time: 74 minutes
- Country: United States
- Language: English

The Magnificent Rogue is a 1946 American comedy film directed by Albert S. Rogell and written by Dane Lussier and Sherman L. Lowe. The film stars Lynne Roberts, Warren Douglas, Gerald Mohr, Stephanie Bachelor, Adele Mara and Grady Sutton. The film was released on November 7, 1946, by Republic Pictures.

In the film, a married couple operate an advertising agency. The spouses compete over which of them will sign a contract to advertise a specific brand of cigarettes. The brand's owner is under the impression that the female executive is single and romances her. His current girlfriend is upset about his infidelity.

== Plot ==
While he is away serving in the United States Armed Forces, Steve Morgan's advertising agency is being run by his wife, who goes by her maiden name Pat Brown so clients won't just think of her as the boss's wife. Pat loses a big account and anxiously wants to sign up Smoothies cigarettes, owned by playboy Mark Townley.

Steve returns home and wants Pat to quit work. She believes that Townley will sign only with her, so colleague Vera Lane talks them into a wager over which one will succeed. Townley believes that Pat is unmarried and begins romancing her, upsetting burlesque performer Sugar Lee, his girlfriend.

Complications arise as Vera secretly schemes to ruin Pat's plans, helping her own advancement in the agency. Steve and Sugar end up together at a nightclub where they are spotted by Pat, who mistakenly believes her husband is cheating on her. Steve gets fed up and decides to leave town, but Sugar is able to convince Pat of the truth. The couple reunites as they leave together on the train.

== Cast ==
- Lynne Roberts as Pat Brown Morgan
- Warren Douglas as Steve Morgan
- Gerald Mohr as Mark Townley
- Stephanie Bachelor as Vera Lane
- Adele Mara as Sugar Lee
- Grady Sutton as George Sheffield
- Donia Bussey as Mrs. Sheffield
- Ruth Lee as Lita Andrews
- Charles Coleman as Jefferson O'Neal
- Dorothy Christy as Clerk
