= Gertrude Walker =

American screenwriter

- Born: Gertrude Winifred Walker; April 8, 1902; Ohio, USA
- Died: June 18, 1995 (aged 93); California, USA
- Education: Ohio State University
- Occupations: Screenwriter; actress; novelist
- Spouse: Charles Winninger (m. 1951)

Gertrude Winifred Walker (April 8, 1902 - June 18, 1995) was an American screenwriter, TV writer, and novelist known for her work on B movies at Republic Pictures.

== Biography ==
Gertrude—the only child of Clinton "Razz" Walker and Gertrude White—grew up in Dayton, Ohio, and attended the Longfellow School. She graduated from Ohio State University, where she performed in plays, before deciding to move to Los Angeles.

In Hollywood, Gertrude sought work as an actress, showgirl, and entertainment journalist at fan magazines. Her one credited acting role was in 1935's Mary Burns, Fugitive; she also worked as a Ziegfeld Follies girl.

Walker ended up on the writing staff at Republic Pictures, where she enjoyed the collegial atmosphere and working with writer Dane Lussier. As Walker later recounted, she was almost laid off from the studio in 1944—until her boss saw her script for Silent Partner (which she had written in three days) and was blown away. During her time later in the decade at Warner Brothers, she also gained recognition as a novelist; her 1948 title, So Deadly Fair, was named one of the 10 best mystery novels of the year. In 1955, her novel Diamonds Don't Burn was published.

In 1951, she married comedic actor Charles Winninger in Mexico; the pair remained married until his death. They met years earlier when she was employed as his secretary.

== Selected works ==
Film:

- Insurance Investigator (1951)
- The Damned Don't Cry (1950)
- Railroaded! (1947)
- Crime of the Century (1946)
- Behind City Lights (1945)
- End of the Road (1944)
- Silent Partner (1944)
- Whispering Footsteps (1943)
- Mystery Broadcast (1943)
- Danger! Women at Work (1943)

TV:

- The New Adventures of Charlie Chan (1 episode, 1958)
- Front Row Center (1 episode, 1956)
- Screen Directors Playhouse (1 episode, 1955)

Novel:

- Diamond Don't Burn (1955)
- So Deadly Fair (1948)
- The King Was in Her Parlour (1944)
