= Silent Partner (1944 film) =

1944 film by George Blair

- Directed by: George Blair
- Screenplay by: Dane Lussier; Gertrude Walker
- Produced by: George Blair
- Starring: William "Bill" Henry; Beverly Lloyd; Grant Withers; Ray Walker; Joan Blair; Roland Drew
- Cinematography: William Bradford
- Edited by: Ralph Dixon
- Music by: Joseph Dubin
- Production company: Republic Pictures
- Distributed by: Republic Pictures
- Release date: June 9, 1944
- Running time: 56 minutes
- Country: United States
- Language: English

Silent Partner is a 1944 American thriller film directed by George Blair and written by Dane Lussier and Gertrude Walker. Starring William "Bill" Henry, Beverly Lloyd, Grant Withers, Ray Walker, Joan Blair and Roland Drew, the film was released on June 9, 1944, by Republic Pictures.

== Plot ==
Reporters investigating the death of a friend begin to suspect that their newspaper's editor might be responsible.

== Cast ==
- William "Bill" Henry as Jeffrey Swales
- Beverly Lloyd as Mary Price
- Grant Withers as Bob Ross
- Ray Walker as Reilly
- Joan Blair as Lady Sylvia Marlowe
- Roland Drew as Harry Keating
- George Meeker as R.S. Treavor
- Wally Vernon as Room Service Waiter
- John Harmon as Blackie Barton
- Dick Elliott as Pop
- Eddie Fields as Tony
- Patricia Knox as Dolly Daring
