= G.I. War Brides =

- Theatrical release poster
- Directed by: George Blair
- Screenplay by: John K. Butler
- Produced by: Armand Schaefer
- Starring: Anna Lee; James Ellison; Harry Davenport; William "Bill" Henry; Stephanie Bachelor; Doris Lloyd; Robert Armstrong
- Cinematography: Alfred S. Keller
- Edited by: Tony Martinelli
- Music by: Ernest Gold; Joseph Dubin
- Production company: Republic Pictures
- Distributed by: Republic Pictures
- Release date: August 12, 1946
- Running time: 69 minutes
- Country: United States
- Language: English

G.I. War Brides is a 1946 American comedy film directed by George Blair and written by John K. Butler. The film stars Anna Lee, James Ellison, Harry Davenport, William "Bill" Henry, Stephanie Bachelor, Doris Lloyd and Robert Armstrong. The film was released on August 12, 1946, by Republic Pictures.

== Cast ==
- Anna Lee as Linda Powell
- James Ellison as Steve Giles
- Harry Davenport as Grandpa Giles
- William "Bill" Henry as Capt. Roger Kirby
- Stephanie Bachelor as Elizabeth Wunderlich
- Doris Lloyd as Beatrice Moraski
- Robert Armstrong as Dawson
- Joe Sawyer as Sgt. Frank Moraski
- Mary McLeod as Kathleen Fitzpatrick
- Carol Savage as Joyce (Mrs. Steve) Giles
- Patricia Edwards as Margaret Lee
- Helen Gerald as Ruth Giles
- Patrick O'Moore as Harold R. Williams
- Maxine Jennings as WAC Sgt. Polly Williams
- Russell Hicks as Insp. Ramsaye
- Francis Pierlot as Mr. Wunderlich
- Pierre Watkin as Editor
- Eugene Lay as Donnie
- Lois Austin as Miss Nolan
- Virginia Carroll as Helen Mayo
- Lester Dorr as Steward (uncredited)
