= Mystery Broadcast =

1943 film by George Sherman

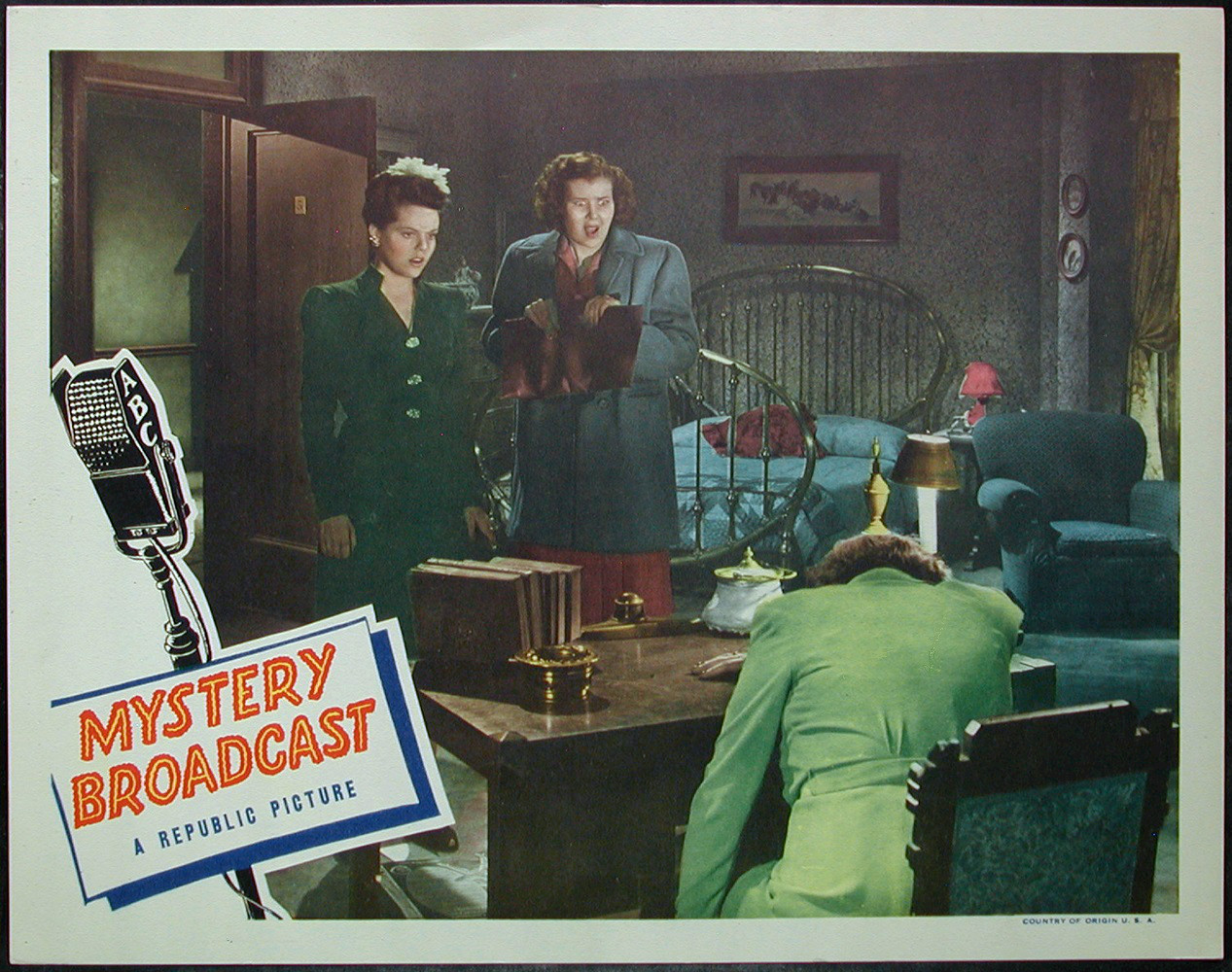
- Lobby card
- Directed by: George Sherman
- Screenplay by: Dane Lussier; Gertrude Walker
- Produced by: George Sherman
- Starring: Frank Albertson; Ruth Terry; Nils Asther; Wynne Gibson; Paul Harvey; Mary Treen
- Cinematography: William Bradford
- Edited by: Arthur Roberts
- Music by: Mort Glickman
- Production company: Republic Pictures
- Distributed by: Republic Pictures
- Release date: November 23, 1943
- Running time: 63 minutes
- Country: United States
- Language: English

Mystery Broadcast is a 1943 American mystery film directed by George Sherman and written by Dane Lussier and Gertrude Walker. The film stars Frank Albertson, Ruth Terry, Nils Asther, Wynne Gibson, Paul Harvey, and Mary Treen. The film was released on November 23, 1943, by Republic Pictures.

== Plot ==
An old murder case intrigues a couple of radio detectives and a sound man. They interview some of the people involved in the case, but soon find their primary suspect dead. They attempt to solve the mystery.

== Cast ==
- Frank Albertson as Michael Jerome
- Ruth Terry as Jan Cornell
- Nils Asther as Ricky Moreno
- Wynne Gibson as Eve Stanley
- Paul Harvey as Arthur J. Stanley
- Mary Treen as Smitty
- Addison Richards as Bill Burton
- Joseph Crehan as Chief Daniels
- Alice Fleming as Mida Kent
- Francis Pierlot as Crunch
- Ken Carpenter as Radio Announcer
- Emmett Vogan as Don Fletcher
