= George Lynn (actor) =

American actor and writer (1906–1967)

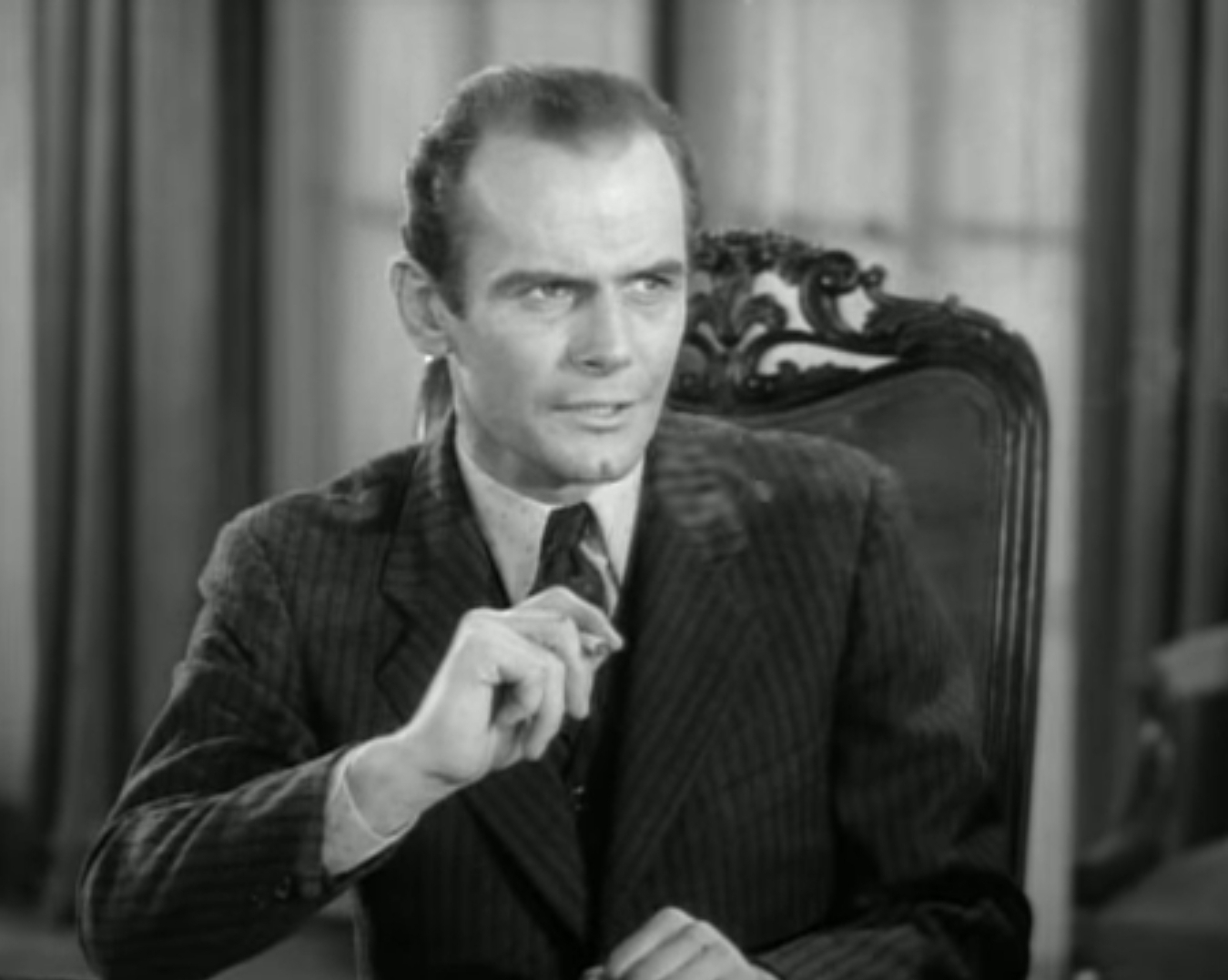
- Lynn in Adventures of Captain Marvel (1941)
- Born: Peter George Lynn; January 28, 1906; Cumberland, Maryland, U.S.
- Died: December 3, 1967 (aged 61); Los Angeles, California, U.S.
- Occupations: Actor; writer
- Years active: 1936–1961

Peter George Lynn (January 28, 1906 – December 3, 1967) was an American actor and writer.

== Early life ==
Lynn was born January 28, 1906, in Cumberland, Maryland. He graduated from Washington and Lee University and worked as a pilot for Curtiss-Wright before he became an actor.

== Career ==
Lynn acted in about 30 plays at the Pasadena Playhouse. He appeared in films such as Sinner Take All (1936), the MGM Academy Award nominated short Torture Money (1937), The Great Dictator (1940), and To Be or Not to Be (1942). Towards the end of his career he appeared in television series such as The Adventures of Rin Tin Tin (1956–8), The Untouchables (1959) and The Deputy (1961).

Lynn was also a playwright and a contributor of material published in magazines.

== Death ==
Lynn died December 3, 1967, in Los Angeles, California.

== Selected filmography ==
=== Film ===
- Tough Guy (1936) - Patrolman (uncredited)
- Sinner Take All (1936) - Stephen
- Torture Money (1937, Short) - Larry Martin
- Internes Can't Take Money (1937) - Joe (uncredited)
- The Duke Comes Back (1937) - Al
- Charlie Chan at Monte Carlo (1937) - Al Rogers
- City Girl (1938) - Steve (uncredited)
- Island in the Sky (1938) - Charlie - Butler's Henchman (uncredited)
- Too Hot to Handle (1938) - Harry Harding (uncredited)
- Time Out for Murder (1938) - Henchman Blackie
- Cipher Bureau (1938) - Lt. Tydall
- Newsboys' Home (1938) - Balke (uncredited)
- Risky Business (1939) - Jackson's Henchman (uncredited)
- Pardon Our Nerve (1939) - Bodyguard (uncredited)
- Society Smugglers (1939) - Austin
- Mystery Plane (1939) - 'Brandy' Rand
- Let Us Live (1939) - Joe Taylor
- Wolf Call (1939) - Father Devlin
- Mr. Wong in Chinatown (1939) - Captain Guy Jackson
- Quick Millions (1939) - H. Jenkins 'Hank' Pierson
- The Housekeeper's Daughter (1939) - Gangster (uncredited)
- Buried Alive (1939) - Gus Barth
- The Man Who Wouldn't Talk (1940) - Convict (uncredited)
- The Lone Wolf Strikes (1940) - Dorgan
- Northwest Passage (1940) - Joe Turner (uncredited)
- Kit Carson (1940) - James King
- Drums of the Desert (1940) - Capt. Jean Bridaux
- The Great Dictator (1940) - Commander of Storm Troopers
- The Saint in Palm Springs (1941) - Jimmy (uncredited)
- The Penalty (1941) - George, Police Operative (uncredited)
- Adventures of Captain Marvel (1941, Serial) - Prof. Dwight Fisher [Ch. 1-6]
- Saddlemates (1941) - LeRoque aka Wanechee
- Caught in the Draft (1941) - Pilot (uncredited)
- Criminals Within (1941) - Prof. Carroll (uncredited)
- Bombay Clipper (1942) - Bland
- Plan for Destruction (1942) - Rudolf Hess
- To Be or Not to Be (1942) - Actor-Adjutant
- Grand Central Murder (1942) - Paul Rinehart
- A-Haunting We Will Go (1942) - Darby Mason
- The Secret Code (1942, Serial) - Chief Stover [Ch.1]
- Commandos Strike at Dawn (1942) - German Radio Announcer (uncredited)
- G-Men vs. the Black Dragon (1943, Serial) - Pilot Thug (uncredited)
- Tarzan Triumphs (1943) - Nazi Pilot (uncredited)
- Tonight We Raid Calais (1943) - German Lieutenant
- Slightly Dangerous (1943) - 'Times' Reporter (uncredited)
- They Came to Blow Up America (1943) - Herman - Gestapo Driver (uncredited)
- Dr. Gillespie's Criminal Case (1943) - Mack (uncredited)
- Hitler's Madman (1943) - 1st Officer (uncredited)
- Appointment in Berlin (1943) - Under Officer (uncredited)
- The North Star (1943) - German Pilot (uncredited)
- Northern Pursuit (1943) - Johnson - Mountie (uncredited)
- The Crime Doctor's Strangest Case (1943) - Walter Burns (uncredited)
- The Impostor (1944) - Soldier (uncredited)
- None Shall Escape (1944) - Otto - S.S. Officer (uncredited)
- The Fighting Sullivans (1944) - Officer (uncredited)
- Two-Man Submarine (1944) - Norman Fosmer
- The Hitler Gang (1944) - SS Man (uncredited)
- The Story of Dr. Wassell (1944) - Lt. Smith (uncredited)
- Wilson (1944) - Reporter (uncredited)
- The House of Frankenstein (1944) - Inspector Gerlach
- She Gets Her Man (1945) - Sinister Cameraman (uncredited)
- High Powered (1945) - Joe Jackson (uncredited)
- Sudan (1945) - Bata
- The Master Key (1945, Serial) - Herman - Chief Thug
- Counter-Attack (1945) - Russian Lieutenant (uncredited)
- Secret Agent X-9 (1945, Serial) - Bach
- Shady Lady (1945) - Card Player (uncredited)
- Girl on the Spot (1946) - Tony Bracken (uncredited)
- Tangier (1946) - Lieutenant
- Lost City of the Jungle (1946, Serial) - Henchman Marlow
- Her Kind of Man (1946) - Houseman (uncredited)
- Notorious (1946) - Photographer (uncredited)
- Under Nevada Skies (1946) - Henchman LeBlanc
- Monsieur Beaucaire (1946) - Soldier (uncredited)
- Suddenly, It's Spring (1944) - Reporter (uncredited)
- Killer at Large (1947) - Rand
- The Naked City (1948) - Det. Fredericks (uncredited)
- Best Man Wins (1948) - Mr. Crow
- For the Love of Mary (1948) - (uncredited)
- The Snake Pit (1948) - Doctor (uncredited)
- Homicide for Three (1948) - Bill Daggett - aka Ludwig Rose
- Criss Cross (1949) - Andy (uncredited)
- The Beautiful Blonde from Bashful Bend (1949) - Townsman (uncredited)
- Take One False Step (1949) - Policeman (uncredited)
- D.O.A. (1949) - Homicide Detective (uncredited)
- Gun Crazy (1950) - Holdup Victim (uncredited)
- Side Street (1950) - Frank (uncredited)
- The Asphalt Jungle (1950) - Detective at Ciavelli's Apartment (uncredited)
- Union Station (1950) - Detective Moreno (uncredited)
- Three Secrets (1950) - Reporter (uncredited)
- Insurance Investigator (1951) - Jerry Hatcher (uncredited)
- Apache Drums (1951) - Bartender (uncredited)
- Show Boat (1951) - Blackjack Dealer (uncredited)
- The Day the Earth Stood Still (1951) - Colonel Ryder (uncredited)
- The Desert Fox: The Story of Rommel (1951) - German Lieutenant (uncredited)
- Fixed Bayonets! (1951) - Colonel - 26th Infantry (uncredited)
- My Favorite Spy (1951) - Official (uncredited)
- The Bushwackers (1952) - Guthrie
- Finders Keepers (1952) - Allen (uncredited)
- Something to Live For (1952) - Kennedy Brother, Executive (uncredited)
- The Atomic City (1952) - Robert Kalnick
- My Man and I (1952) - Bit Role (uncredited)
- Bonzo Goes to College (1952) - Bartender (uncredited)
- The Congregation (1952)
- The Lawless Breed (1953) - Duncan - Texas Ranger (uncredited)
- Raiders of the Seven Seas (1953) - Spanish Officer (uncredited)
- Powder River (1953) - Deputy (uncredited)
- The Great Adventures of Captain Kidd (1953) - London Official (uncredited)
- Ride Clear of Diablo (1954) - Deputy (uncredited)
- Magnificent Obsession (1954) - Williams - Bob's Butler (uncredited)
- Sign of the Pagan (1954) - Servant (uncredited)
- World in My Corner (1956) - Mallinson's Butler (uncredited)
- The Werewolf (1956) - Dr. Morgan Chambers
- The Boss (1956) - Tom Masterson
- Gun Brothers (1956) - Blake, Gang Member (uncredited)
- The Halliday Brand (1957) - Townsman #3
- Mister Cory (1957) - Headwaiter (uncredited)
- The Man Who Turned to Stone (1957) - Dr. Freneau
- The Deadly Mantis (1957) - Bus Driver (uncredited)
- Beau James (1957) - Reporter (uncredited)
- La donna che venne dal mare (1957) - Dario Nucci
- I Was a Teenage Frankenstein (1957) - Sgt. Burns
- Sing, Boy, Sing (1958) - Mr. Starrett (uncredited)
- Girl in the Woods (1958) - Operator
- Voice in the Mirror (1958) - Alcoholic (uncredited)
- Career (1959) - Stage Manager (uncredited)

=== Television ===
- The Lone Ranger (1950) - Squire Turnbull
- The Adventures of Rin Tin Tin (1956–1958) - Clint Desay / Red
- The Untouchables (1959) - Doctor / Hood
- The Deputy (1961) - Willis
