= Eric Sinclair =

Eric Sinclair may refer to:

- Eric Sinclair (footballer) (born 1954), Scottish footballer
- Eric Sinclair (actor) (1922–2004), American film and television actor
