= Scotland Yard Investigator =

1945 film by George Blair

- Directed by: George Blair
- Written by: Randall Faye
- Produced by: Armand Schaefer; George Blair
- Starring: Edgar Barrier; Stephanie Bachelor; C. Aubrey Smith; Lionel Atwill
- Cinematography: William Bradford; Ernest Miller
- Edited by: Fred Allen
- Music by: Charles Maxwell
- Production company: Republic Pictures
- Distributed by: Republic Pictures
- Release date: September 20, 1945
- Running time: 68 minutes
- Country: United States
- Language: English

Scotland Yard Investigator is a 1945 American crime film directed by George Blair and starring C. Aubrey Smith, Erich von Stroheim and Stephanie Bachelor. Following the outbreak of the Second World War the Mona Lisa is moved to a London gallery for safekeeping, where a German art collector attempts to steal it. The film was a loose sequel to Republic's 1944 thriller Secrets of Scotland Yard with a number of the same cast and crew.

== Plot ==
When Paris is liberated during World War II, the Louvre administration plans to fetch the Mona Lisa from the safety of the mountain vault in London operated by Britain's National Gallery. Sir James Collison, director of the National Gallery, works closely with his granddaughter Toni. While the National Gallery plans to safely return the painting, infamous art collector Carl Hoffmeyer plans to steal it. He has stolen many fine pieces before, but this would be the crown jewel of his collection.

Hoffmeyer's plan includes his two henchmen, Henri and Jules, who pose as the people from the Louvre arriving to collect the painting. But when Hoffmeyer gets his hands on it he concludes it is a forgery. He is unsure whether the gallery director is in on the scam, so he pays him a visit, reveals his part in the theft and tells the director of his suspicion. By Collison's reaction, Hoffmeyer concludes he was unaware of the scam.

Hoffmeyer suspects an art dealer named Sam Todworthy of the theft of the real Mona Lisa, and pays him a visit. Sam had told Hoffmeyer before the attempt to steal the painting, that it might not be the real one.

Prior to Hoffmeyer's visit, Sam and his wife Emma get a visit from a Frenchman, Anton Miran. He is the brother of one of the two men sent from the Louvre to leave the real painting with the London gallery, and he is the one who gave it to Sam. He wants the real painting back, but Sam refuses to give it to him. Sam kills Miran and hides the body, just before Hoffmeyer comes to visit.

Sam offers to sell the painting to Hoffmeyer for £100,000, but Hoffmeyer turns down the offer. As soon as Hoffmeyer leaves the dealer's gallery, he orders his men to kill Sam and get the painting. When Jules refuses to take part in the killing, Hoffmeyer kills him. When Jules's body is found a few days later, Scotland Yard investigates the murder.

Sam tries to sell the real Mona Lisa back to the National Gallery, showing it to Collison. Collison is tempted to buy it, to avoid the scandal that would ensue when the French and the media got word of the painting vanishing. His granddaughter advises him to contact the police.

Collison tries to raise money to buy the painting back. Toni gets a call from the director of the Louvre, Professor Renault, telling her that the two men he sent out to collect the painting have been kidnapped. He will come to collect the painting in person.

Toni talks to her fiancé, Inspector Bob Cartwright of Scotland Yard, who is also in charge of the investigation of Jules's murder. Bob talks to Collison, but since Collison is convinced that the painting would be in danger if the police tightened the noose around Sam, he doesn't tell Bob the name of the person who has the painting.

Sam is murdered before either the police or Collison get to him. Collison suspects Hoffmeyer of the murder, so Bob brings him in for questioning. There is no proof that he is the killer, and he denies having anything to do with either of the two murders.

Hoffmeyer is let loose, but Collison sneaks into his house trying to retrieve the painting. Hoffmeyer intercepts him and pulls out the sword from his cane, forcing him to follow him to his study, where he keeps the painting. Sam's wife Emma turns up and shoots Hoffmeyer to avenge her husband. Hoffmeyer runs his sword through her chest, and they are both mortally wounded. Hoffmeyer tries to slash the Mona Lisa with his sword, but is stopped by Collison.

After the showdown, Toni and Bob arrive at the scene and take the painting. They bring it to the airport, where Renault is meeting them. The fake is hung on Collison's wall, and years later he sits underneath it and tells his great-grandson about the adventure that brought it there.

== Main cast ==
- C. Aubrey Smith (credited as Sir Aubrey Smith) as Sir James Collison
- Erich von Stroheim as Carl Hoffmeyer
- Stephanie Bachelor as Toni Collison
- Forrester Harvey as Sam Todworthy
- Doris Lloyd as Emma Todworthy
- Eva Moore as Mary Collison
- Richard Fraser as Inspector Bob Cartwright
- Victor Varconi as Jules
- Georges Metaxa as Henri
- Emil Rameau as Prof. Renault
- Colin Campbell as Waters
- Frederick Worlock as Colonel Brent
- Billy Bevan as Porter

== Bibliography ==
- Glancy, H. Mark. When Hollywood Loved Britain: The Hollywood 'British' Film 1939-1945. Manchester University Press, 1999.
- Richards, Jeffrey. Visions of Yesterday. Routledge, 1973.
