= The Inner Circle (1946 film) =

1946 American film directed by Philip Ford

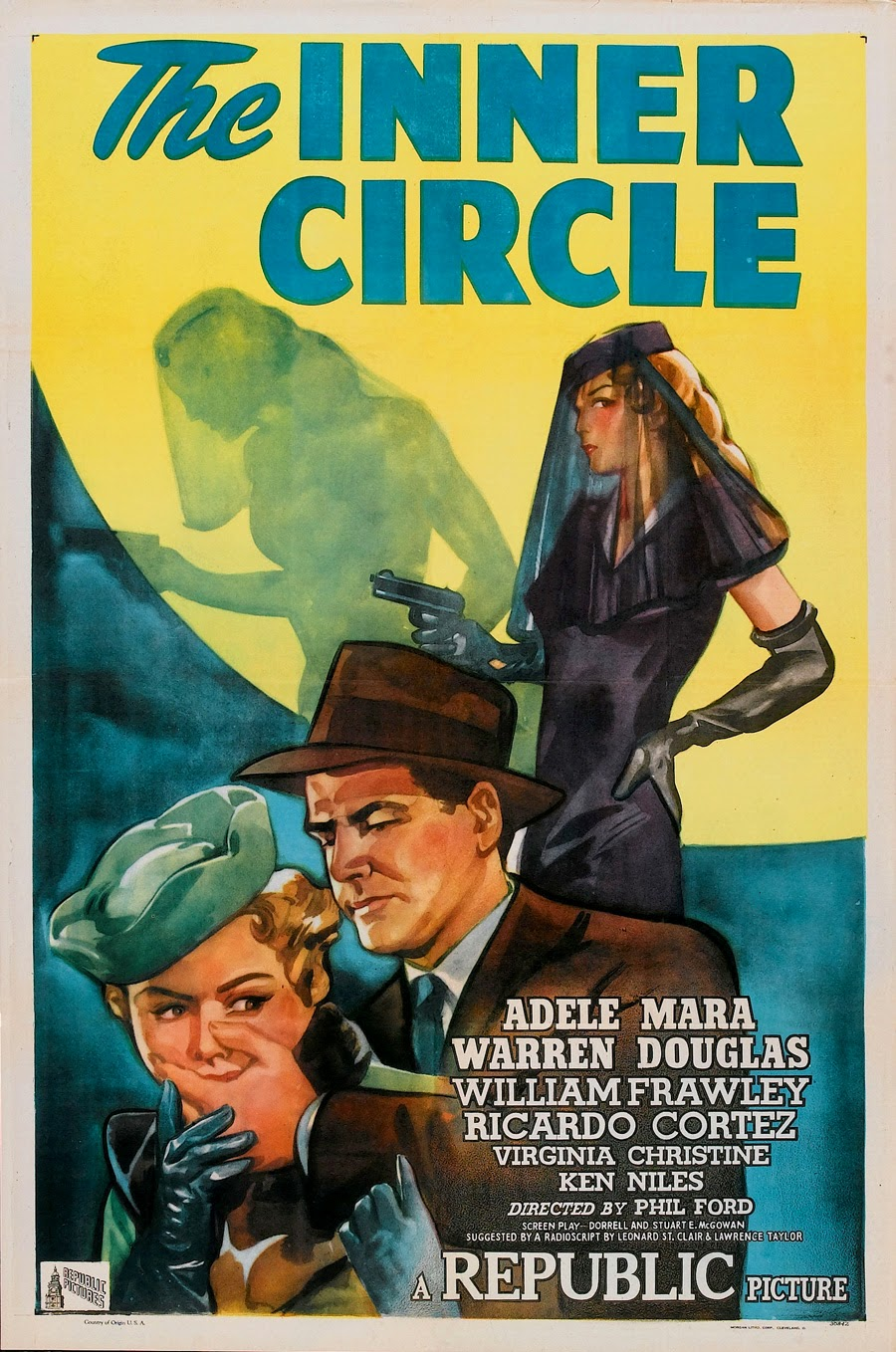
- Directed by: Philip Ford (as Phil Ford)
- Written by: Leonard St. Clair, Lawrence Taylor
- Screenplay by: Dorrell McGowan; Stuart E. McGowan
- Produced by: William J. O'Sullivan (as Wm J. O'Sullivan)
- Starring: Adele Mara; Warren Douglas; William Frawley; Ricardo Cortez
- Cinematography: Reggie Lanning
- Edited by: Tony Martinelli
- Music by: Mort Glickman
- Production company: Republic Pictures
- Distributed by: Republic Pictures
- Release date: August 7, 1946 (United States)
- Running time: 57 minutes
- Country: United States
- Language: English

The Inner Circle is a 1946 American film noir mystery film directed by Philip Ford starring Adele Mara, Warren Douglas, William Frawley and Ricardo Cortez. It was produced and distributed by Republic Pictures.

== Plot ==
A secretary frames a private investigator (Warren Douglas) for murder to deflect suspicion away from her younger sister.

== Cast ==
- Adele Mara as Geraldine Travis, alias Gerry Smith
- Warren Douglas as Johnny Strange
- William Frawley as Det. Lt. Webb
- Ricardo Cortez as Duke York
- Virginia Christine as Rhoda Roberts
- Ken Niles as Ken, Radio Announcer
- Will Wright as Henry Boggs
- Dorothy Adams as Emma Wilson
- Martha Montgomery as Anne Travis Lowe
- Edward Gargan as Parking Ticket Cop
- Fred Graham as Duke's Henchman
- Eddie Parker as Duke's Henchman
- Robert J. Wilke as Police Officer Cummings

== Reception ==
A Variety critic wrote, "The Inner Circle hasn't much to recommend it. Even whodunit addicts will turn a quizzical eyebrow at the tangled, illogical, and crudely put-together story".
