= Lightnin' in the Forest =

1948 film by George Blair

- Theatrical release poster
- Directed by: George Blair
- Screenplay by: John K. Butler
- Story by: J. Benton Cheney
- Produced by: Sidney Picker
- Starring: Lynne Roberts; Don "Red" Barry; Warren Douglas; Lorna Gray; Lucien Littlefield; Claire Du Brey
- Cinematography: John MacBurnie
- Edited by: Irving M. Schoenberg
- Music by: Mort Glickman
- Production company: Republic Pictures
- Distributed by: Republic Pictures
- Release date: March 25, 1948
- Running time: 58 minutes
- Country: United States
- Language: English

Lightnin' in the Forest is a 1948 American comedy film directed by George Blair and written by John K. Butler. The film stars Lynne Roberts, Don "Red" Barry, Warren Douglas, Lorna Gray, Lucien Littlefield and Claire Du Brey. The film was released on March 25, 1948 by Republic Pictures.

== Cast ==
- Lynne Roberts as Jerri Vail
- Don "Red" Barry as Stan Martin
- Warren Douglas as David Lamont
- Lorna Gray as Dell Parker
- Lucien Littlefield as Joad
- Claire Du Brey as Martha
- Roy Barcroft as Police Lieut. Bain
- Paul Harvey as Judge Waterman
- Al Eben as Bud
- Jerry Jerome as Stinger
- George Chandler as Elevator operator
- Eddie Dunn as Police Officer
- Dale Van Sickel as 'Val' Valtin
- Bud Wolfe as Jim Pritchard
- Hank Worden as Bartender
