= The Ghost Goes Wild =

1947 film by George Blair

- Theatrical release poster
- Directed by: George Blair
- Screenplay by: Randall Faye
- Story by: Randall Faye; Taylor Caven
- Produced by: Armand Schaefer
- Starring: James Ellison; Anne Gwynne; Edward Everett Horton; Ruth Donnelly; Stephanie Bachelor; Grant Withers
- Cinematography: John Alton
- Edited by: Fred Allen
- Music by: Joseph Dubin
- Production company: Republic Pictures
- Distributed by: Republic Pictures
- Release date: March 8, 1947
- Running time: 66 minutes
- Country: United States
- Language: English

The Ghost Goes Wild is a 1947 American comedy film directed by George Blair and written by Randall Faye. The film stars James Ellison, Anne Gwynne, Edward Everett Horton, Ruth Donnelly, Stephanie Bachelor and Grant Withers. It was released on March 8, 1947 by Republic Pictures.

== Cast ==
- James Ellison as Monte Crandall
- Anne Gwynne as Phyllis Beecher
- Edward Everett Horton as Eric
- Ruth Donnelly as Aunt Susan Beecher
- Stephanie Bachelor as Irene Winters
- Grant Withers as Bill Winters
- Lloyd Corrigan as The Late Timothy Beecher
- Emil Rameau as Prof. Jacques Dubonnet
- Jonathan Hale as Max Atterbury
- Charles Halton as T. O'Connor Scott
- Holmes Herbert as Judge
- Edward Gargan as Newsstand Man
- Eugene Gericke as Reporter
- Michael Hughes as Reporter
- William Austin as Barnaby
- Robert J. Wilke as Burglar
