= Outlaws of Pine Ridge =

1942 film by William Witney

- Directed by: William Witney
- Written by: Norman S. Hall
- Produced by: Edward J. White
- Starring: Don 'Red' Barry; Lynn Merrick; Noah Beery
- Cinematography: Bud Thackery
- Edited by: William P. Thompson
- Music by: Mort Glickman; Arnold Schwarzwald
- Production company: Republic Pictures
- Distributed by: Republic Pictures
- Release date: October 27, 1942
- Running time: 55 minutes
- Country: United States
- Language: English

Outlaws of Pine Ridge is a 1942 American Western film directed by William Witney and starring Don 'Red' Barry, Lynn Merrick and Noah Beery.

The film's art direction was by Russell Kimball.

== Cast ==
- Don 'Red' Barry as Chips Barrett
- Lynn Merrick as Ann Hollister
- Noah Beery as Honest John Hollister
- Donald Kirke as Jeff Cardeen
- Emmett Lynn as Jackpot McGraw
- Francis Ford as Bartender
- Clayton Moore as Lane Hollister
- Stanley Price as Henchman Steve Mannion
- George J. Lewis as Henchman Ross
- Forrest Taylor as Sheriff Gibbons

== Bibliography ==
- Len D. Martin. The Republic Pictures Checklist: Features, Serials, Cartoons, Short Subjects and Training Films of Republic Pictures Corporation, 1935-1959. McFarland, 1998.
