= C. Aubrey Smith =

English cricketer and actor (1863–1948)

Sir C. Aubrey Smith CBE
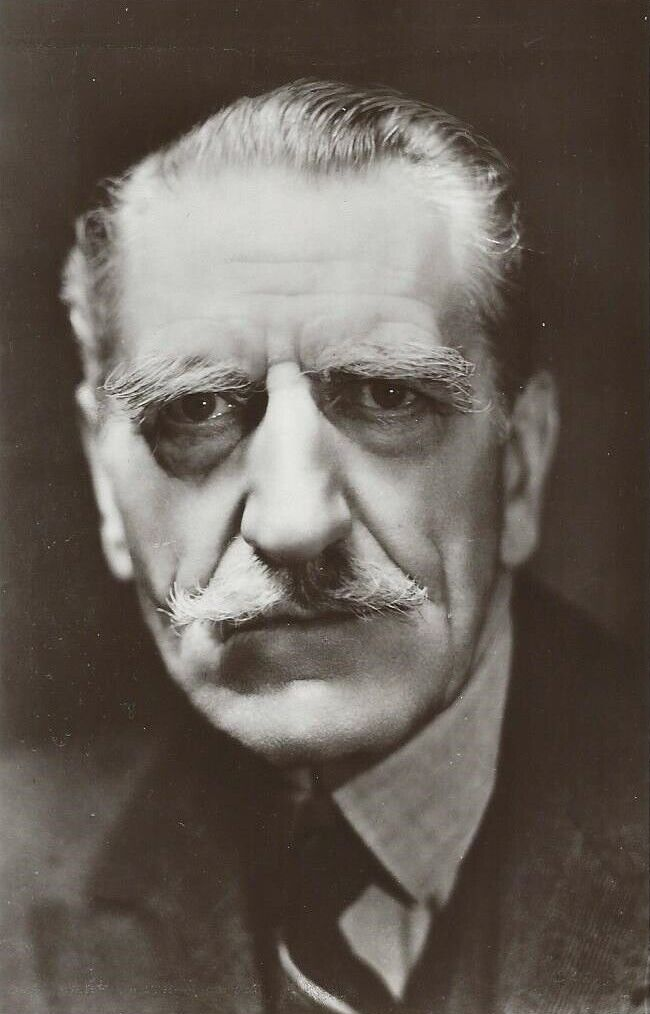
- Smith in about 1940

Personal information
- Full name: Charles Aubrey Smith
- Born: 21 July 1863; London, England
- Died: 20 December 1948 (aged 85); Beverly Hills, California, U.S.
- Batting: Right-handed
- Bowling: Right arm fast

International information
- National side: England
- Only Test (cap 66): 12 March 1889 v South Africa

Domestic team information
- Years: Team
- 1882–1896: Sussex
- 1882–1885: Cambridge University
- 1889/90: Transvaal

Career statistics
| Competition | Test | First-class |
|---|---|---|
| Matches | 1 | 143 |
| Runs scored | 3 | 2,986 |
| Batting average | 3.00 | 13.63 |
| 100s/50s | 0/0 | 0/10 |
| Top score | 3 | 85 |
| Balls bowled | 154 | 17,953 |
| Wickets | 7 | 346 |
| Bowling average | 8.71 | 22.34 |
| 5 wickets in innings | 1 | 19 |
| 10 wickets in match | 0 | 1 |
| Best bowling | 5/19 | 7/16 |
| Catches/stumpings | 0/– | 97/– |
- Source: CricketArchive, 23 September 2008

Sir Charles Aubrey Smith (21 July 1863 – 20 December 1948) was an English test cricketer and actor of stage and screen. During his acting career, he acquired a niche as the officer-and-gentleman type, as in the first sound version of The Prisoner of Zenda (1937). In Hollywood, he organised British actors into a cricket team, much intriguing local spectators.

== Early life ==
Smith was born in London, England, to Charles John Smith (1838–1928), a medical doctor, and Sarah Ann (née Clode, 1836–1922). His sister, Beryl Faber (died 1912), was married to Cosmo Hamilton.

Smith was educated at Charterhouse School and St John's College, Cambridge. He settled in South Africa to prospect for gold in 1888–89. While there he developed pneumonia and was wrongly pronounced dead by doctors. He married Isabella Wood in 1896.

== Cricket career ==
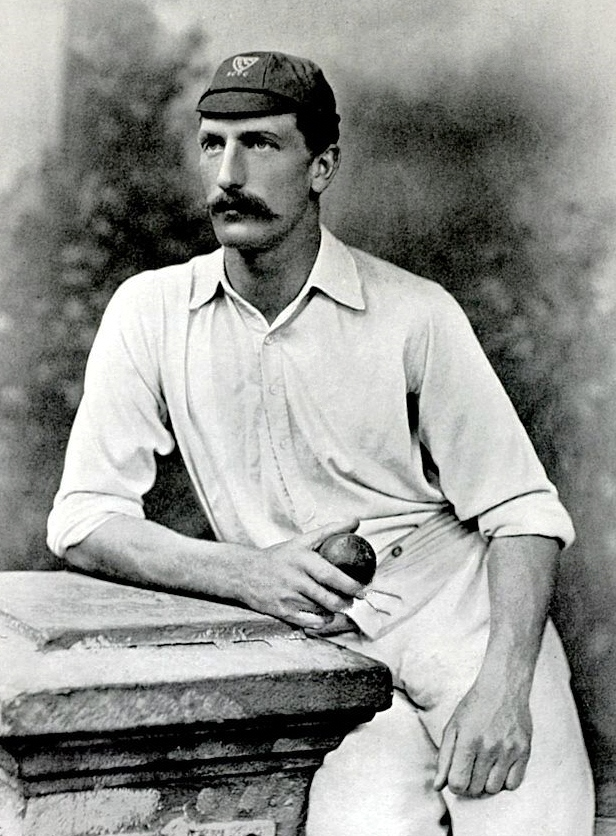
Smith in about 1895

As a cricketer, Smith was primarily a right arm fast bowler, though he was also a useful right-hand lower-order batsman and a good slip fielder. His oddly curved bowling run-up, which started from deep mid-off, earned him the nickname "Round the Corner Smith". When he bowled round the wicket his approach was concealed from the batsman by the umpire until he emerged, leading W. G. Grace to comment "it is rather startling when he suddenly appears at the bowling crease." He is widely regarded as one of the very best amateur bowlers of his day. He played for Cambridge University (1882–1885) and for Sussex at various times from 1882 to 1892.

While in South Africa he captained the Johannesburg English XI. He captained England to victory in his only Test match, against South Africa at Port Elizabeth in March 1889, taking five wickets for nineteen runs in the first innings. The English team who played were by no means representative of the best players of the time and nobody at the time realised that the match would enter the cricket records as an official Test match. His home club for much of his career was West Drayton Cricket club. Actors would arrive from London to the purpose-built railway station in West Drayton and taken by horse-drawn carriage to the ground.

In 1932, he founded the Hollywood Cricket Club and created a pitch with imported English grass. He attracted fellow expatriates such as David Niven, Laurence Olivier, Nigel Bruce (who served as captain), Leslie Howard and Boris Karloff to the club as well as local American players. Smith's stereotypical Englishness spawned several amusing anecdotes: while fielding at slip for the Hollywood Club, he dropped a difficult catch and ordered his English butler to fetch his spectacles; they were brought on to the field on a silver platter. The next ball looped gently to slip, to present the kind of catch that "a child would take at midnight with no moon." Smith dropped it and, snatching off his lenses, commented, "Damned fool brought my reading glasses." Decades after his cricket career had ended, when he had long been a famous face in films, Smith was spotted in the pavilion on a visit to Lord's. "That man over there seems familiar", remarked one member to another. "Yes", said the second, seemingly oblivious to his Hollywood fame, "Chap called Smith. Used to play for Sussex."

== Acting career ==
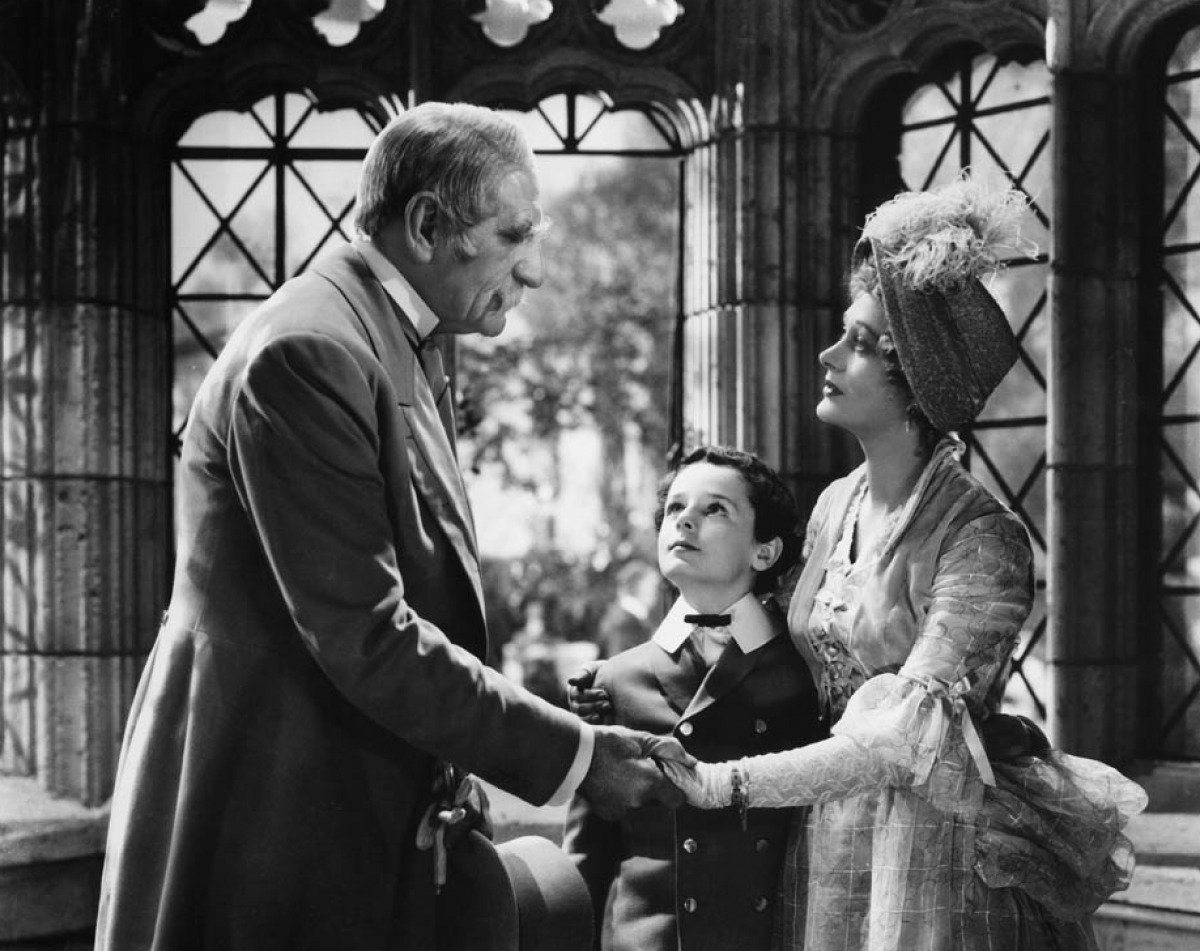
Smith, Freddie Bartholomew and Dolores Costello in Little Lord Fauntleroy (1936)

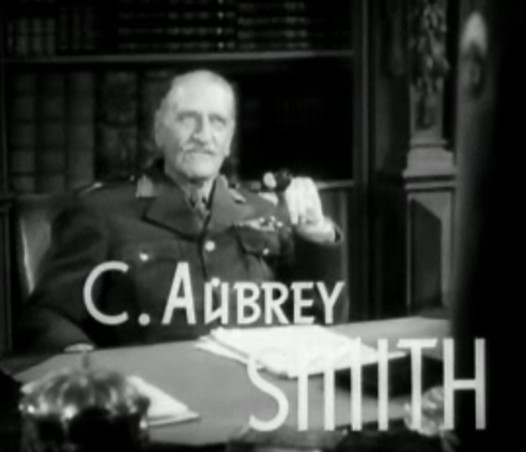
Smith in Waterloo Bridge (1940)

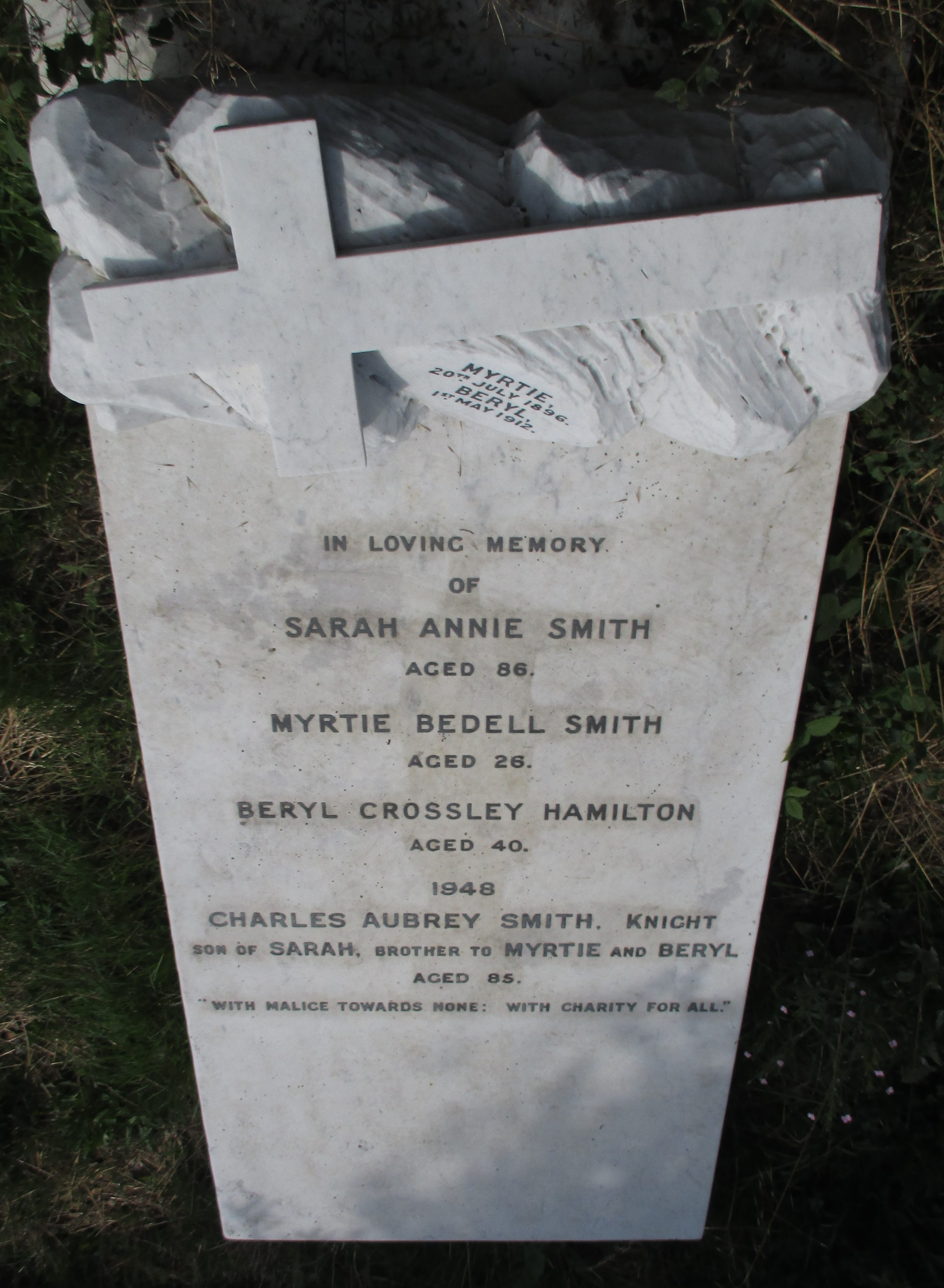
Smith's gravestone in St Leonard's churchyard, Aldrington, Brighton and Hove. "With malice towards none: with charity for all."

Smith began acting on the London stage in 1895. His first major role was in The Prisoner of Zenda the following year, playing the dual lead roles of king and look-alike. Forty-one years later, he appeared in the most acclaimed film version of the novel, this time as the wise old adviser to Ronald Colman. When Raymond Massey asked him to help him understand the role of Black Michael, he answered "My dear Ray, in my time I have played every part in The Prisoner of Zenda except Princess Flavia. And I always had trouble with Black Michael!" He made his Broadway debut as early as 1895 in The Notorious Mrs. Ebbsmith. In 1907 he appeared with Marie Doro in The Morals of Marcus, a play Doro later made into a silent film. Smith later appeared in a revival of George Bernard Shaw's Pygmalion in the starring role of Henry Higgins.

Smith appeared in early films for the nascent British film industry, starring in The Bump in 1920 (written by A. A. Milne for the company Minerva Films, which was founded in 1920 by the actor Leslie Howard and his friend and story editor Adrian Brunel). Smith later went to Hollywood where he had a successful career as a character actor playing either officer or gentleman roles. One role in 1937 was as Colonel Williams in Wee Willie Winkie, starring Shirley Temple, Victor McLaglen, Cesar Romero and June Lang. He was regarded as being the unofficial leader of the British film industry colony in Hollywood, which Sheridan Morley characterised as the Hollywood Raj, a select group of British actors who were seen to be colonising the capital of the film business in the 1930s. Other film stars considered to be "members" of this select group were David Niven (whom Smith treated like a son), Ronald Colman, Rex Harrison, Robert Coote, Basil Rathbone, Nigel Bruce (whose daughter's wedding he had attended as best man), Leslie Howard (whom Smith had known since working with him on early films in London), and Patric Knowles.

Smith expected his fellow countrymen to report for regular duty at his Hollywood Cricket Club. Anyone who refused was known to "incur his displeasure". Fiercely patriotic, Smith became openly critical of the British actors of enlistment age who did not return to fight after the outbreak of World War II in 1939. Smith loved playing on his status as Hollywood's "Englishman in Residence". His bushy eyebrows, beady eyes, handlebar moustache, and height of 6'2" made him one of the most recognisable faces in Hollywood.

Smith starred alongside leading ladies such as Greta Garbo, Elizabeth Taylor, and Vivien Leigh as well as the actors Clark Gable, Laurence Olivier, Ronald Colman, Maurice Chevalier, and Gary Cooper. His films include The Prisoner of Zenda (1937), The Four Feathers (1939), Hitchcock's Rebecca (1940), Dr. Jekyll and Mr. Hyde (1941), And Then There Were None (1945) in which he played General Mandrake, and the 1949 remake of Little Women starring Elizabeth Taylor and Janet Leigh, in which he portrayed the aged grandfather of Laurie Lawrence (played by a young Peter Lawford), who generously gives a piano to the frail Beth March (played by Margaret O'Brien). He also appeared as the father of Maureen O'Sullivan in Tarzan the Ape Man, the first Tarzan film with Johnny Weissmüller. Smith also played a leading role as the Earl of Dorincourt in David O. Selznick's adaption Little Lord Fauntleroy (1936).

He appeared in Dennis Wheatley's 1934 thriller Such Power Is Dangerous, about an attempt to take over Hollywood, under the fictitious name of Warren Hastings Rook (rather than Charles Aubrey Smith). Author Evelyn Waugh leaned heavily on Smith in drawing the character of Sir Ambrose Abercrombie for Waugh's 1948 satire of Hollywood The Loved One. Commander McBragg in the TV cartoon Tennessee Tuxedo and His Tales is a parody of him.

== Death ==
Smith died of pneumonia at home in Beverly Hills on 20 December 1948, aged 85. He was survived by his wife Isobel Mary Scott Wood (m. 1896-1948) and their daughter, Honor. His body was cremated and nine months later, in accordance with his instructions, the ashes were returned to England and interred in his mother's grave at St Leonard's churchyard in Hove, Sussex.

== Honours and awards ==
Smith has a star on the Hollywood Walk of Fame.

Smith was an officer in the Legion of Frontiersmen.

In 1933, he served on the first board of the Screen Actors Guild.

He was appointed a Commander of the Order of the British Empire (CBE) in 1938 and was knighted by George VI in 1944 for services to Anglo-American amity.

== Complete filmography ==
| Year | Film | Role | Director | Notes |
|---|---|---|---|---|
| 1915 | The Builder of Bridges | Edward Thursfield | | |
| 1915 | John Glayde's Honor | John Glayde | | |
| 1916 | Jaffery | Jaffery | | |
| 1916 | The Witching Hour | Jack Brookfield | | |
| 1918 | Red Pottage | Lord Newhaven | Meyrick Milton | |
| 1920 | The Face at the Window | Bentinck | Wilfred Noy | |
| 1920 | Castles in Spain | The builder | Horace Lisle Lucoque | |
| 1920 | The Bump | | | Short subject |
| 1920 | The Shuttle of Life | Reverend John Stone | D. J. Williams | Lost film |
| 1922 | The Bohemian Girl | Devilshoof | Josef von Sternberg | Incomplete film |
| 1922 | Flames of Passion | Richard Hawke, K.C. | Graham Cutts | |
| 1923 | The Temptation of Carlton Earle | Carlton Earle | Wilfred Noy | |
| 1924 | The Unwanted | Col. Carrington | Walter Summers | (rediscovered and restored 2011) |
| 1924 | The Rejected Woman | Peter Leslie | Albert Parker | |
| 1928 | Show People | Extra at Movie Preview | King Vidor | uncredited |
| 1930 | Such Is the Law | Sir James Whittaker | Sinclair Hill | |
| 1930 | Birds of Prey | Arthur Hilton | Basil Dean; John E. Burch (assistant) | |
| 1930 | Passion Flower | Man at Ferry Boat Pier | William C. deMille (uncredited) | uncredited |
| 1931 | The Bachelor Father | Sir Basil Algernon 'Chief' Winterton | Robert Z. Leonard | |
| 1931 | Trader Horn | St. Clair | W.S. Van Dyke | uncredited |
| 1931 | Contraband Love | Paul Machin, JP | Sidney Morgan | |
| 1931 | Daybreak | General von Hertz | Jacques Feyder | |
| 1931 | Never the Twain Shall Meet | Mr. Pritchard | W. S. Van Dyke | |
| 1931 | Just a Gigolo | Lord George Hampton | Jack Conway | |
| 1931 | The Man in Possession | Mr. Dabney | Sam Wood (uncredited) | |
| 1931 | Son of India | Dr. Wallace | Jacques Feyder | |
| 1931 | Guilty Hands | Reverend Hastings | W.S. Van Dyke | |
| 1931 | The Phantom of Paris | Bourrelier | John S. Robertson | |
| 1931 | Surrender | Count Reichendorf | William K. Howard | |
| 1932 | Polly of the Circus | Reverend James Northcott | Alfred Santell | |
| 1932 | Tarzan the Ape Man | James Parker | W. S. Van Dyke | Jane's father |
| 1932 | But the Flesh Is Weak | Florian Clement | Jack Conway | |
| 1932 | Love Me Tonight | the Duc d'Artelines | Rouben Mamoulian | |
| 1932 | Trouble in Paradise | Adolph J. Giron | Ernst Lubitsch | |
| 1932 | No More Orchids | Jerome Cedric | Walter Lang | |
| 1932 | They Just Had to Get Married | Aubrey Hampton | Edward Ludwig | |
| 1933 | The Monkey's Paw | Sgt. Maj. Morris | Wesley Ruggles; Ernest B. Schoedsack (uncredited) | |
| 1933 | Luxury Liner | Edward Thorndyke | Lothar Mendes | |
| 1933 | Secrets | Mr. William Marlowe | Frank Borzage | |
| 1933 | The Barbarian | Cecil Harwood | Sam Wood | |
| 1933 | Adorable | Prime Minister Von Heynitz | William Dieterle | |
| 1933 | Morning Glory | Robert Harley "Bob" Hedges | Lowell Sherman | |
| 1933 | Curtain at Eight | Detective Jim Hanvey | E. Mason Hopper | |
| 1933 | Bombshell | Mr. Wendell Middleton | Victor Fleming | |
| 1933 | Queen Christina | Aage | Rouben Mamoulian | |
| 1934 | Caravan | Baron von Tokay | Erik Charell | |
| 1934 | Gambling Lady | Peter Madison | Archie Mayo | |
| 1934 | The House of Rothschild | Duke of Wellington | Alfred L. Werker; Maude T. Howell (asst.) | |
| 1934 | The Scarlet Empress | Christian August, Prince of Anhalt-Zerbst | Josef von Sternberg | Catherine's father |
| 1934 | One More River | Gen. Charwell | James Whale | |
| 1934 | Bulldog Drummond Strikes Back | Captain Reginald Neilsen aka Colonel | Roy Del Ruth | |
| 1934 | Cleopatra | Enobarbus | Cecil B. DeMille | |
| 1934 | We Live Again | Prince Kortchagin | Rouben Mamoulian | |
| 1934 | The Firebird | Police Inspector Miller | William Dieterle | |
| 1935 | The Lives of a Bengal Lancer | Major Hamilton | Henry Hathaway | |
| 1935 | Clive of India | British Prime Minister | Richard Boleslawski | |
| 1935 | The Gilded Lily | Lloyd Granton, Duke of Loamshire | Wesley Ruggles | |
| 1935 | The Right to Live | Major Licondra | William Keighley | |
| 1935 | The Florentine Dagger | Dr. Lytton | Robert Florey | |
| 1935 | Jalna | Uncle Nicholas Whiteoak | John Cromwell | |
| 1935 | China Seas | Sir Guy Wilmerding | Tay Garnett | |
| 1935 | The Crusades | The Hermit | Cecil B. DeMille | |
| 1935 | Hollywood Extra Girl | | | Documentary short |
| 1935 | The Tunnel | Lloyd | Maurice Elvey | |
| 1936 | Little Lord Fauntleroy | The Earl of Dorincourt | John Cromwell | |
| 1936 | Romeo and Juliet | Lord Capulet | George Cukor | his only Shakespearean role on screen |
| 1936 | The Garden of Allah | Father J. Roubier | Richard Boleslawski | |
| 1936 | Lloyd's of London | Old 'Q' | Henry King | |
| 1936 | The Story of Papworth, the Village of Hope | | | short |
| 1937 | Wee Willie Winkie | Colonel Williams | John Ford | |
| 1937 | The Prisoner of Zenda | Colonel Zapt | John Cromwell; W. S. Van Dyke (uncredited) | |
| 1937 | The Hurricane | Father Paul | John Ford | |
| 1937 | Thoroughbreds Don't Cry | Sir Peter Calverton | Alfred E. Green | |
| 1938 | Four Men and a Prayer | Col. Loring Leigh | John Ford | |
| 1938 | Kidnapped | Duke of Argyle | Alfred L. Werker | |
| 1938 | Sixty Glorious Years | Duke of Wellington | Herbert Wilcox | |
| 1939 | East Side of Heaven | Cyrus Barrett Snr. | David Butler | |
| 1939 | The Four Feathers | General Burroughs | Zoltan Korda | |
| 1939 | The Sun Never Sets | Sir John Randolph | Rowland V. Lee | |
| 1939 | Five Came Back | Professor Henry Spengler | John Farrow | |
| 1939 | The Under-Pup | Grandpa | Richard Wallace | |
| 1939 | Eternally Yours | Gramps, aka Bishop Peabody | Tay Garnett; Charles Kerr (assistant) | |
| 1939 | Another Thin Man | Colonel Burr MacFay | W. S. Van Dyke | |
| 1939 | Balalaika | Gen. Karagin | Reinhold Schünzel | |
| 1940 | City of Chance | The Judge | Ricardo Cortez | |
| 1940 | Rebecca | Colonel Julyan | Alfred Hitchcock | |
| 1940 | Beyond Tomorrow | Allan Chadwick | A. Edward Sutherland | |
| 1940 | Waterloo Bridge | Sr. Military officer / The Duke | Mervyn LeRoy | |
| 1940 | A Bill of Divorcement | Dr. Alliot | John Farrow | |
| 1940 | A Little Bit of Heaven | Grandpa | Andrew Marton | |
| 1941 | Maisie Was a Lady | Al Walpole | Edwin L. Marin | |
| 1941 | Free and Easy | The Duke | George Sidney; Edward Buzzell (uncredited) | |
| 1941 | Dr. Jekyll and Mr. Hyde | Bishop Manners | Victor Fleming | |
| 1943 | Forever and a Day | Admiral Eustace Trimble | multiple director | |
| 1943 | Two Tickets to London | Admiralty Detective Fairchild | Edwin L. Marin | |
| 1943 | Flesh and Fantasy | Dean of Norwalk | Julien Duvivier | Episode 2 |
| 1943 | Madame Curie | Lord Kelvin | Mervyn LeRoy | |
| 1944 | The Adventures of Mark Twain | Oxford Chancellor | Irving Rapper | |
| 1944 | The White Cliffs of Dover | Colonel Walter Forsythe | Clarence Brown | |
| 1944 | Sensations of 1945 | Dan Lindsey | Andrew Stone | |
| 1944 | Secrets of Scotland Yard | Sir Christopher Pelt | George Blair | |
| 1945 | Forever Yours | Grandfather | William Nigh | |
| 1945 | Scotland Yard Investigator | Sir James Collison | George Blair | |
| 1945 | And Then There Were None | General Sir John Mandrake | René Clair | |
| 1946 | Terror by Night | Elderly gentleman on train station | Roy William Neill | Uncredited |
| 1946 | Cluny Brown | Colonel Charles Duff Graham | Ernst Lubitsch | |
| 1946 | Rendezvous with Annie | Sir Archibald Clyde | Allan Dwan | |
| 1947 | High Conquest | Col. Hugh Bunning | Irving Allen | |
| 1947 | Unconquered | Lord Chief Justice | Cecil B. DeMille | |
| 1947 | An Ideal Husband | Earl of Caversham, Goring's Father | Alexander Korda | |
| 1948 | Luxury Liner | Edward Thorndike | Richard Whorf | |
| 1949 | Little Women | Mr. James Laurence | Mervyn LeRoy | Final film role; released posthumously |

== See also ==
- List of England cricketers who have taken five-wicket hauls on Test debut

Sporting positions
| Preceded by W. G. Grace | English national cricket captain 1888–1889 | Succeeded by W. G. Grace |
| Preceded by Frederick Lucas | Sussex county cricket captain 1886–1888 | Succeeded by Billy Newham |
| Preceded by Billy Newham | Sussex county cricket captain 1890 | Succeeded by Billy Newham |
