= Insurance Investigator (film) =

1951 film by George Blair

- Theatrical release poster
- Directed by: George Blair
- Screenplay by: Gertrude Walker
- Story by: Gertrude Walker; Beth Brown
- Produced by: William T. Lackey
- Starring: Richard Denning; Audrey Long; John Eldredge; Hillary Brooke; Reed Hadley; Jonathan Hale
- Cinematography: John MacBurnie
- Edited by: Harold Minter
- Music by: Stanley Wilson
- Production company: Republic Pictures
- Distributed by: Republic Pictures
- Release date: March 16, 1951 (Los Angeles)
- Running time: 60 minutes
- Country: United States
- Language: English

Insurance Investigator is a 1951 American crime film directed by George Blair, written by Gertrude Walker and starring Richard Denning, Audrey Long, John Eldredge and Hillary Brooke. The film was released by Republic Pictures and opened in Los Angeles on March 16, 1951 as the second feature to Vengeance Valley.

== Cast ==
- Richard Denning as Tom Davison
- Audrey Long as Nancy Sullivan
- John Eldredge as John Hammond
- Hillary Brooke as Addie Wilson
- Reed Hadley as Chuck Malone
- Jonathan Hale as Russell James
- Roy Barcroft as Duke Wallace
- Wilson Wood as Jimmy Marshall
- William Tannen as 1st Hood
- Phillip Pine as 2nd Hood
- Crane Whitley as Chief Meyers
- Ruth Lee as Miss Pringle
- Patricia Knox as Hat Check Girl
- M'liss McClure as Cigarette Girl
- Maurice Samuels as Tony
