= Torture Money =

1937 film

- Directed by: Harold S. Bucquet
- Written by: John C. Higgins
- Produced by: Jack Chertok
- Starring: Edwin Maxwell; George Lynn
- Music by: Carl W. Stalling
- Distributed by: MGM
- Release date: January 2, 1937
- Running time: 21 minutes
- Country: United States
- Language: English

Torture Money is a 1937 American short crime film directed by Harold S. Bucquet. In 1938, it won an Oscar for Best Short Subject, Two-reel at the 10th Academy Awards.

== Cast ==
- Edwin Maxwell as Milton Beacher
- George Lynn as Larry Martin
- Murray Alper as Little Davie Barkell
- King Baggot as false accident witness
- Margaret Bert as nurse
- John Hamilton as Capt. Michael Karnahan
- Bernadene Hayes as false accident victim
- Mary Howard as Nurse Barry
- Norman Willis as henchman doc
