= The Undercover Woman =

1946 film by Thomas Carr

- Theatrical release poster
- Directed by: Thomas Carr
- Screenplay by: Sherman L. Lowe; Robert F. Metzler; Jerry Sackheim
- Produced by: Rudolph E. Abel; William J. O'Sullivan
- Starring: Stephanie Bachelor; Robert Livingston; Isabel Withers; Richard Fraser
- Cinematography: Bud Thackery
- Edited by: Fred Allen
- Production company: Republic Pictures
- Distributed by: Republic Pictures
- Release date: April 11, 1946
- Running time: 56 minutes
- Country: United States
- Language: English

The Undercover Woman is a 1946 American comedy mystery film directed by Thomas Carr, written by Sherman L. Lowe, Robert F. Metzler and Jerry Sackheim, and starring Stephanie Bachelor, Robert Livingston, Richard Fraser, Isabel Withers, Helene Heigh, Edythe Elliott and Elaine Lange. It was released on April 11, 1946, by Republic Pictures.

== Cast ==
- Stephanie Bachelor as Marcia Conroy
- Robert Livingston as Sheriff Don Long
- Isabel Withers as Penny Davis
- Helene Heigh as Laura Vixon
- Edythe Elliott as Mrs. Grey
- Elaine Lange as Juanita Gillette
- John Dehner as Walter Hughes
- Betty Blythe as Cissy Van Horne
- Tom London as Lem Stone
- Richard Fraser as Gregory Vixon
- Larry J. Blake as Simon Gillette
