= Isabel Withers =

American actress (1896–1968)

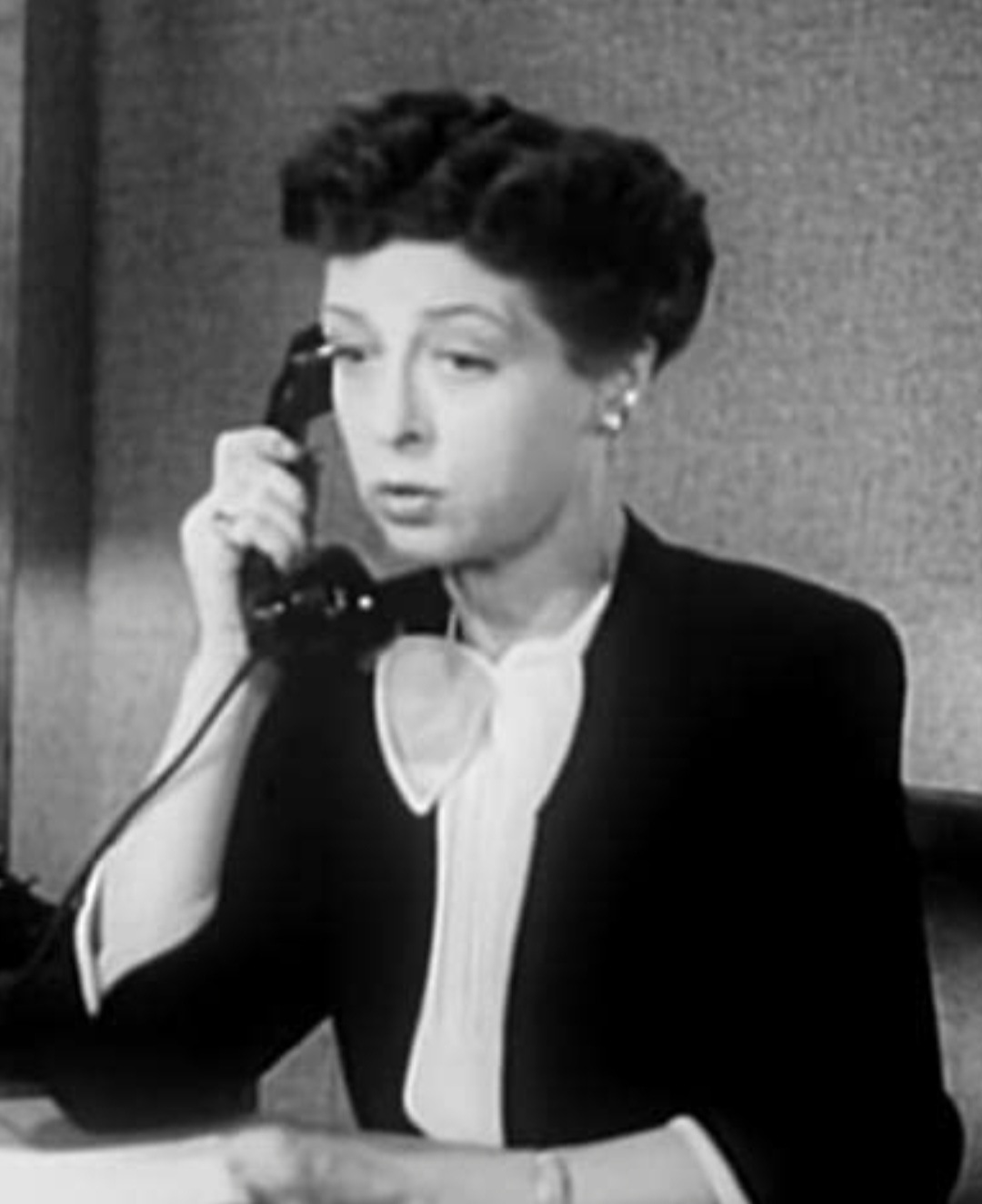
- Withers in The Missing Corpse (1945)
- Born: January 20, 1896; Frankton, Indiana, U.S.
- Died: September 3, 1968 (aged 72); Hollywood, California, U.S.
- Occupation: Actress
- Years active: 1930–1960

Isabel Withers (January 20, 1896 – September 3, 1968) was an American actress, who worked in theatre, film, and television.

== Early life ==
Withers was born in Frankton, Indiana, a small town just outside of Anderson, Indiana. In her youth, Withers lived in Coffeyville, Kansas, and Illinois. She spent large chunks of her childhood, including the summer after her high school graduation, in Moweaqua, Kansas, where a cousin paid for her to have acting lessons.

== Career ==
=== Theater ===
She attended school in Kansas City, Missouri, and later enrolled in a school of drama there, and joining a Chautauqua circuit repertoire company. At the time it was playing in Billings, Montana, performing The Melting Pot, a play by Israel Zangwill. Following a route of tented colleges, Withers first appeared on the road in Little Women. She played the leading role in The Tailor Made Man after a season in stock theatre in Utica, New York. She performed in Cappy Ricks in Chicago.

George M. Cohan selected Withers for the lead feminine role, with Lowell Sherman, in the Chicago company of The Tavern. In New York City she appeared in Kempy at the Belmont Theater. While in New York Withers modeled for an exclusive gown shop during the day. Henry Duffy wired her to come to San Francisco, California, to do Kempy just as she was on her way to visit her mother in Los Angeles. She made her way south acting in Love Em and Leave 'Em and Rain. Withers starred in Rain at the old Orpheum Theater, 12th Street, San Francisco, in November 1926. Drawing comparisons to actress Jeanne Eagels, she drew praise in the role of Sadie Thompson.

=== Movies and television ===
Withers accumulated ninety-two screen and television credits. She made her debut in movie talkies in 1930 in a small role opposite Joan Crawford in Paid. Some of her screen appearances were uncredited parts. Withers appeared in films with Barbara Stanwyck, Gary Cooper, and Marlene Dietrich. She was also in her share of B-movies. She had a bit part as a laundress in Monkey Business, which starred Cary Grant, Marilyn Monroe, and Ginger Rogers.

She performed on television during the early 1960s in such shows as Four Star Playhouse (1955), Lassie (1956), The Millionaire (1957), and The Bob Cummings Show (1958).

Isabel Withers died in 1968 in Hollywood, California, aged 72. Her ashes were sent back from Hollywood to her family's burial plot in Moweaqua's West Side Cemetery.

A permanent display devoted to her in the Moweaqua Area Historical Society features period clothes from her heyday along with movie posters and other memorabilia.

== Partial filmography ==
- Women Won't Tell (1932)
- Brother Rat (1938)
- Henry and Dizzy (1942)
- Behind Prison Walls (1943)
- Law Men (1944)
- I Love a Mystery (1945)
- The Missing Corpse (1945)
- A Sporting Chance (1945)
- The Gay Senorita (1945)
- Girls of the Big House (1945)
- The Undercover Woman (1946)
- Air Hostess (1949)
- Perfect Strangers (1950)
- Beware of Blondie (1950)
- A Wonderful Life (1951)

== Sources ==
- New York Times, Who's Who, October 5, 1924, p. X2.
- New York Times, Week Promises Brilliant New Offerings In Theaters, May 22, 1927, p. 17.
- Oakland Tribune, Rain Billed For 12th Street Theater, Sunday, November 14, 1926, p. 2W.
