= The Purple V =

1943 film by George Sherman

- Film poster
- Directed by: George Sherman
- Written by: Robert R. Mill; Bertram Millhauser; Curt Siodmak
- Produced by: George Sherman
- Starring: John Archer; Mary McLeod; Fritz Kortner
- Cinematography: Ernest Miller
- Edited by: Charles Craft
- Music by: Mort Glickman
- Production company: Republic Pictures
- Distributed by: Republic Pictures
- Release date: March 12, 1943
- Running time: 58 minutes
- Country: United States
- Language: English

The Purple V is a 1943 American war film directed by George Sherman and starring John Archer, Mary McLeod and Fritz Kortner. The Purple V marked German stage star Fritz Kortner's American film debut. Actors John Archer and Mary McLeod were borrowed from M-G-M for the production. (Note: The film title, The Purple V relates to the V for Victory slogan advocated buy the Allies.)

== Plot ==
Royal Air Force flyer Jimmy Thorne (John Archer) and pilot Roger (Peter Lawford) are returning from a night photo reconnaissance flight over Germany, Jimmy recognizes the area. He reveals he lived there 10 years earlier, when his father was American consul in the region.

Encountering a German cargo aircraft, they shoot it down, but Jimmy is forced to parachute from his damaged aircraft so that Roger can get the important photos back to England. Jimmy lands near the wreck of the German aircraft, finding a dead German aviator, and takes his uniform. He then helps another Luftwaffe officer, near death who entrusts him with a personal note from Field Marshal Irwin Rommel to Adolf Hitler. The officer sees a purple V tattoo on Jimmy's left arm and realizes he has given away the secrets of the North African campaign.

Jimmy heads to the nearby village of Diederfeld, where an old acquaintance, Professor Thomas Forster (Fritz Kortner), his daughter Katti (Mary McLeod), and son Paul (Rex Williams). The Forsters are wary of Jimmy and claim not to remember him. Finally Jimmy reminds Katti and Paul of childhood events. Paul is determined to help Jimmy.

At the wreck, the German officer is found alive and tells state police officer Johann Keller (Kurt Katch) about Jimmy's purple V tattoo, but dies before he can reveal Rommel's message. The Forsters soon hear a radio announcement about an RAF pilot in a German uniform with a purple V tattoo. Paul and Katti volunteer to take the message out of the country, but the professor says it is too dangerous.

Paul brands his left arm with a V, takes the German uniform but is caught by as German patrol and shot. Katti, the professor and Jimmy hear a radio announcement that the British spy is dead. Jimmy and Katti prepare to go to Zurich, posing as brother and sister. Keller suspects Paul was not the spy, and goes to the Forster home to force the professor and Katti to divulge Jimmy's whereabouts.

Jimmy kills Keller and he and Katti begin their trip. At a final border check, the professor dressed in Keller's uniform, "arrests" Jimmy and Katti and takes them to an airfield. When the professor's real identity is discovered, he holds off several soldiers before being killed, allowing Jimmy and Katti time to escape on a waiting aircraft.

When Jimmy and Katti land in England, Roger vouches for Jimmy which authenticates the important message. Jimmy and Katti decide to marry later.

== Cast ==
- John Archer as Jimmy Thorne
- Mary McLeod as Katti Forster
- Fritz Kortner as Thomas Forster
- Rex Williams as Paul Forster
- Kurt Katch as Johann Keller
- Walter Sande as Otto Horner
- Wilhelm von Brincken as Col. von Ritter
- Peter Lawford as Roger
- Kurt Kreuger as Walter Heyse
- Eva Hyde as Marta
- Irene Seidner as Mrs. Vogel
- Richard Aherne as British Radio Operator in Africa
- Holger Bendixen as Bit Role
- Arthur Blake as British General
- Egon Brecher as Clerk
- Frederic Brunn as Corporal
- Michael Dyne as Young British Officer
- Ludwig Hardt as Old Peasant
- Herbert Heyes as American Colonel
- Harry Holcombe as Nazi Pilot
- David Lennox as Bit Role
- Frank Reicher as Bit Role
- Lester Sharpe as Nazi Hospital Physician
- Pepi Sinoff as Old Peasant Woman
- Walter Soderling as Voight
- Sigfrid Tor as Morgenturm
- Leslie Vincent as British Radio Operator

== Production ==
The sets of The Purple V were designed by the art director Russell Kimball. All the action was filmed on sound stages with principal photography starting in early January 1943.

The aircraft in The Purple V were:

- Capelis XC-12
- Curtiss P-40 Warhawk

The Capelis XC-12 was purchased by RKO in March 1939, after which the studio's insurance company permanently grounded the aircraft. Used as a full-size prop, the transport appeared only in ground roles in RKO's feature films made during World War II. Flying sequences used a scale XC-12 miniature. The aircraft became a RKO back lot relic, falling into worse repair during the 1940s with the XC-12 miniature continued to be used in later feature films.

== Reception ==
Hal Erickson reviewed The Purple V for allmovie.com. He said: "Though technically a Republic 'B', the 58-minute The Purple V has glossy production values commensurate with a top-of-the-bill A picture. German expatriate Fritz Kortner plays the largest role, as an anti-Nazi schoolmaster who helps a downed American flyer (John Archer) reached Allied lines with vital war information. As usual, the Nazis are incredibly stupid and lead-footed, enabling the flyer to accomplish his mission. Featured in the cast is Peter Lawford in one of his first major roles of the 1940s (contrary to popular belief, Lawford was not 'discovered' in this film, having made his American screen debut in 1938's Lord Jeff). The only drawback to the film is the lackluster performance by leading lady Mary McLeod."

Aviation film historian Stephen Pendo in Aviation in the Cinema (1985) dismissed The Purple V as "... another low-budget film."
