= The Truth Game =

1928 comedy play by Ivor Novello

The Truth Game is a comedy play by the British writer Ivor Novello, first staged in 1928.

== Film adaptations ==
In 1932, Novello went to Hollywood to adapt the play for MGM as But the Flesh Is Weak. In 1941, the studio produced a remake of Free and Easy.

== Bibliography ==
- Goble, Alan. The Complete Index to Literary Sources in Film. Walter de Gruyter, 1999.
