= Yellow Fin (film) =

1951 American action film by Frank McDonald

- Directed by: Frank McDonald
- Written by: Warren Douglas; Clint Johnson
- Produced by: Ace Herman; Wayne Morris; Lindsley Parsons
- Starring: Wayne Morris; Adrian Booth; Gloria Henry; Damian O'Flynn; Warren Douglas
- Cinematography: William A. Sickner
- Edited by: Ace Herman
- Music by: Edward J. Kay
- Production company: Monogram Pictures
- Distributed by: Monogram Pictures
- Release date: October 10, 1951
- Running time: 74 minutes
- Country: United States
- Language: English

Yellow Fin is a 1951 American action film directed by Frank McDonald and starring Wayne Morris, Lorna Gray and Gloria Henry.

The film's sets were designed by art director Dave Milton. Location shooting took place around the port area of Los Angeles, including Terminal Island.

== Cast ==
- Wayne Morris as Mike Donovan
- Adrian Booth as Nurse Jean Elliott
- Gloria Henry as Nina Torres
- Gordon Jones as Breck
- Damian O'Flynn as Capt. John Donovan
- Warren Douglas as Dr. Steve Elliott
- Rick Vallin as Jan
- Nacho Galindo as Murica
- Paul Fierro as Mano
- Guy Zanette as Larson
- Stanley Blystone as Husky Seaman at Table

== Bibliography ==
- Tom Weaver. Poverty row horrors!: Monogram, PRC, and Republic horror films of the forties. McFarland, 1993.
