= Gangs of the Waterfront =

1945 film by George Blair

- Directed by: George Blair
- Written by: Albert Beich; Samuel Fuller
- Produced by: George Blair (associate producer)
- Cinematography: Marcel Le Picard
- Edited by: Fred Allen
- Distributed by: Republic Pictures
- Release date: July 3, 1945
- Running time: 54 minutes
- Country: United States
- Language: English

Gangs of the Waterfront is a 1945 American crime drama film directed by George Blair, and based on an original story by Samuel Fuller. Robert Armstrong has a dual role as Dutch Malone, a gang leader, and a taxidermist Peter Winkly who is induced to take over the gang while Dutch is sidelined by an auto accident.

== Cast ==
- Robert Armstrong as Peter Winkly / Dutch Malone
- Stephanie Bachelor as Jane Rodgers
- Martin Kosleck as Anjo Ferreati
- Marion Martin as Rita
- William Forrest as Brady
- Wilton Graff as Police Commissioner
- Eddie Hall as Miller
- Jack O'Shea as Ortega
- Davison Clark as Dr. Martin
- Dick Elliott as Police Chief Davis
- unbilled players include Blake Edwards
