= Days of Old Cheyenne =

1943 film by Elmer Clifton

- Directed by: Elmer Clifton
- Written by: Norman S. Hall
- Produced by: Edward J. White
- Starring: Don 'Red' Barry; Lynn Merrick; William Haade
- Cinematography: Reggie Lanning
- Edited by: Harry Keller
- Music by: Mort Glickman
- Production company: Republic Pictures
- Distributed by: Republic Pictures
- Release date: May 15, 1943
- Running time: 56 minutes
- Country: United States
- Language: English

Days of Old Cheyenne is a 1943 American Western film directed by Elmer Clifton and starring Don 'Red' Barry, Lynn Merrick and William Haade.

The film's art direction is by Russell Kimball.

== Cast ==
- Don 'Red' Barry as Clint Ross
- Lynn Merrick as Nancy Carlyle
- William Haade as Big Bill Harmon
- Emmett Lynn as Tombstone Boggs
- Herbert Rawlinson as Governor Frank Shelby
- Charles Miller as John Carlyle
- William Ruhl as Steve Brackett
- Harry McKim as Bobby
- Bob Kortman as Slim Boyd
- Nolan Leary as Higgins
- Kenne Duncan as Henchman Pete
- Art Dillard as Henchman
- Duke Green as Henchman
- Eddie Parker as Poker Player
- Bob Reeves as Townsman
- Ken Terrell as Henchman

== Bibliography ==
- Len D. Martin. The Republic Pictures Checklist: Features, Serials, Cartoons, Short Subjects and Training Films of Republic Pictures Corporation, 1935-1959. McFarland, 1998.
