= Billy Newham =

English cricketer

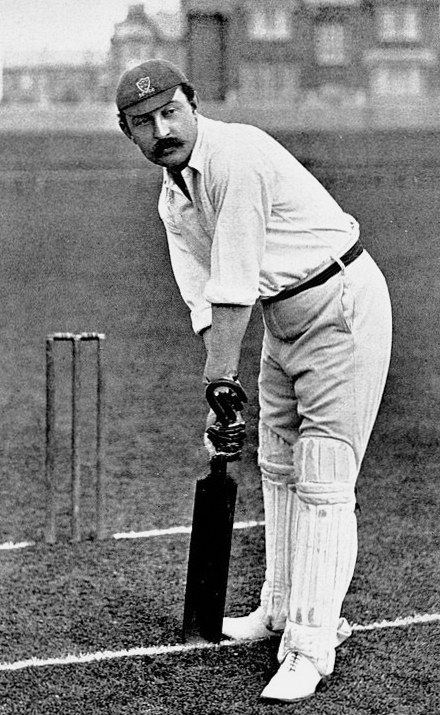

Personal information
- Born: 12 December 1860; Holy Cross, Shrewsbury, England
- Died: 26 June 1944 (aged 83); Portslade, England
- Batting: Right-handed

International information
- National side: England
- Only Test (cap 55): 10 February 1888 v Australia

Career statistics
| Competition | Test | First-class |
|---|---|---|
| Matches | 1 | 368 |
| Runs scored | 26 | 14,657 |
| Batting average | 13.00 | 24.42 |
| 100s/50s | 0/0 | 19/74 |
| Top score | 17 | 201* |
| Balls bowled | – | 1,139 |
| Wickets | – | 10 |
| Bowling average | – | 61.50 |
| 5 wickets in innings | – | 0 |
| 10 wickets in match | – | 0 |
| Best bowling | – | 3/57 |
| Catches/stumpings | 0/– | 183/– |
- Source: CricketArchive, 6 November 2022

William Newham (12 December 1860 – 26 June 1944) was a cricketer who played first-class cricket for Sussex County Cricket Club. He also played one Test match for England against Australia in 1888.

He was educated at Ardingly College, where he was a member of the cricket eleven. He stayed on there as an assistant master until 1887.

Sporting positions
| Preceded by Aubrey Smith | Sussex county cricket captain 1889 | Succeeded by Aubrey Smith |
| Preceded by Aubrey Smith | Sussex county cricket captain 1891–1892 | Succeeded by Billy Murdoch |
