= The Girl from Alaska =

1942 film by Nick Grinde

- Directed by: Nick Grinde; William Witney
- Written by: Robert Ormond Case; Edward T. Lowe Jr.
- Produced by: Armand Schaefer
- Starring: Ray Middleton; Jean Parker; Jerome Cowan
- Cinematography: Jack A. Marta; Bud Thackery
- Edited by: Ernest J. Nims
- Music by: Mort Glickman
- Production company: Republic Pictures
- Distributed by: Republic Pictures
- Release date: April 16, 1942
- Running time: 55 minutes
- Country: United States
- Language: English

The Girl from Alaska is a 1942 American Western film directed by Nick Grinde and William Witney and starring Ray Middleton, Jean Parker and Jerome Cowan. It follows a would-be prospector who becomes involved in a plot to steal from old prospector, but falls in love with his daughter instead.

The film's sets were designed by the art director Russell Kimball. It had its theatrical releases first in USA, then Mexico and Portugal in 1942, 1943 and 1944 respectively.

== Plot ==
Gold prospector Steve Bentley plans to leave Alaska after four unprofitable years. His friend Rave tries to persuade him to join a scheme to steal gold from prospector Boomer McCoy, but Steve refuses. After a drunken farewell party, Steve wakes up to find Mountie Travis has been murdered, and evidence points to him as the killer. Rave's partner Frayne offers to help Steve escape but then threatens to turn him in unless he joins their plan. Steve reluctantly agrees and pretends to be a newcomer named Matt Donovan, who was supposed to assist McCoy.

Accompanied by his dog Tolo, Steve heads to the McCoy camp and meets Pete, Boomer's daughter, who explains that her father is dead and she has dismissed the other workers. As Steve and Pete prepare to transport the gold, Rave and Frayne arrive, claiming that news of the gold strike has spread. Steve is forced to let them join, but he is determined to protect Pete. During a stampede of prospectors, Steve uses the chaos to send Pete away with two workers.

Steve confronts Frayne, and Rave arrives with the Mounties, who arrest Frayne. Rave then finds Steve hiding in a cave and reveals that Frayne killed Travis and framed Steve to manipulate him. Pete returns, stating she hid the gold and wants to stay with Steve. Rave admits Frayne killed the woman in Fort Nelson too, then leaves, congratulating them on their future. Steve calls after Rave, inviting him to their wedding.

== Cast ==
- Ray Middleton as Steve Bentley
- Jean Parker as Mary 'Pete' McCoy
- Jerome Cowan as Ravenhill
- Robert Barrat as Frayne
- Mala as Charley
- Francis McDonald as Pelly
- Raymond Hatton as Shorty
- Milton Parsons as Sanderson
- Nestor Paiva as Geroux
- Ace the Wonder Dog as Tolo, Steve's Dog

== Bibliography ==
- Len D. Martin. The Republic Pictures Checklist: Features, Serials, Cartoons, Short Subjects and Training Films of Republic Pictures Corporation, 1935-1959. McFarland, 1998.
