= The Missing Corpse =

1945 film by Albert Herman

- Directed by: Albert Herman
- Written by: Harry O. Hoyt (story); Raymond L. Schrock (writer)
- Produced by: Leon Fromkess (producer); Martin Mooney (associate producer)
- Starring: See below
- Cinematography: James S. Brown Jr.
- Edited by: W. Donn Hayes
- Music by: Karl Hajos
- Production company: Producers Releasing Corporation
- Distributed by: Producers Releasing Corporation
- Release date: 1 June 1945
- Running time: 62 minutes
- Country: United States
- Language: English

The Missing Corpse is a 1945 American comedy mystery film directed by Albert Herman.

== Plot summary ==
The publisher of The Tribune newspaper, Henry Kruger, who is used to ordering his staff around, finds that he is ignored by everyone in his own home. He is shocked when he discovers a scandalous picture of his own daughter, Phyllis, on the front page of the competing paper, The Daily Argus. Henry pays a visit to the dubious publisher of the competing paper, Andy McDonald, and warns him not to ever publish a picture like that again, or Henry will kill him. Henry is unaware of the fact that a man named "Slippery" Joe Clary has overheard his conversation with Andy, which Joe later reveals to him, threatening to expose him. Henry counters by claiming that Andy was the one who got Joe sentenced with his testimony, and that Andy dated Joe's girlfriend while he was in prison.

To avoid further complications, Henry takes a long vacation, following the suggestion of his chauffeur. While Henry is away, without his family, Slippery Joe murders publisher Andy and hides the body in the trunk of Henry's parked roadster car. Slippery Joe also breaks into Andy's safe, trying to get back a written confession of a previous murder, but finds out the document is missing from the safe and must have been hidden on the publisher Andy's body. Henry has brought his car on the vacation and finds Andy's dead body in the trunk when he arrives at his hunting lodge. Panicking, he decides to dump the body to not be accused of murder, but his chauffeur sees the body before he has a chance to carry out his plan. The chauffeur, eager to protect his employer, removes the body from the car's trunk and hides it inside the lodge.

Visitors come and go at the lodge during the vacation, and the body is moved and hidden several times by the two men to avoid discovery. Soon enough, Slippery Joe also comes looking for the body to retrieve the document. When Henry's family one day discovers that he has left on vacation, they also come up to the lodge to visit. Other family members also arrive at the lodge, and even a news reporter from The Daily Argus, trying to get another scandalous story to publish in the paper, shows up as well.

The body is discovered by every visitor at the lodge at some point, and the chauffeur has to move it constantly to confuse the guests. Henry convinces them all that they have hallucinated. The local police officer, Constable Trigg, discovers Andy's car hidden not far from the cabin, left there by Slippery Joe. Trigg immediately suspects Henry of murdering Andy and arrests him.

James, Henry's son, falsely claims to have murdered Andy to protect Henry from arrest, but then Andy's body is found, with the confession in one of his pockets. Slippery Joe is arrested for Andy's murder and the murder related to the confession. Slippery Joe admits his guilt when he learns that Trigg has the confession, and Henry is cleared of all suspicion. After the commotion, Henry's family promises to not ignore him anymore. Despite this, Henry finds himself sitting alone at breakfast the next day.

== Cast ==
- J. Edward Bromberg as Henry Kruger
- Isabel Randolph as Alice Kruger
- Frank Jenks as Mack Hogan
- Eric Sinclair as James Kruger
- Paul Guilfoyle as Andy McDonald
- Ben Welden as 'Slippery Joe' Clary
- Charles Coleman as Egbert, the butler
- Eddy Waller as Desmond, the caretaker
- Archie Twitchell as Officer Jimmy Trigg
- Isabel Withers as Miss Patterson, Kruger's secretary
- John Shay as Jeffry Dodd
- Anne O'Neal as Mrs. Swonaker
- Ken Terrell as Arresting Officer
- Elayne Adams as McDonald's Secretary
- Lorell Sheldon as Phyllis Kruger
