= Stephanie Bachelor =

American actress (1912–1996)

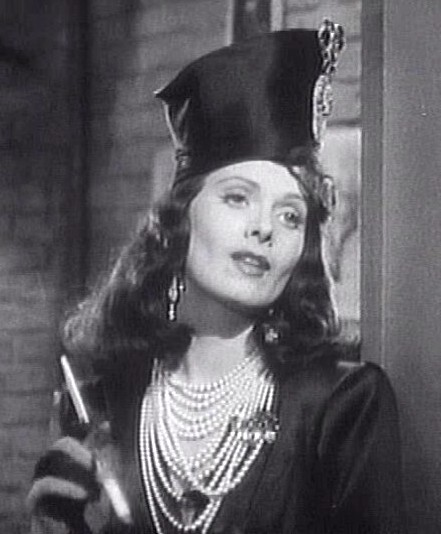
- Bachelor in Lady of Burlesque, 1943
- Born: May 23, 1912; Detroit, Michigan, U.S.
- Died: November 22, 1996 (aged 84); Las Vegas, Nevada, U.S.
- Occupation: Actor
- Years active: 1943–1948
- Spouse: Cornelius “Connie” Hurley (m. 1946; died 1976)

Stephanie Bachelor (May 23, 1912 – November 22, 1996) was an American film actress. During the 1940s, Bachelor briefly achieved leading status in supporting features such as Republic Pictures' Secrets of Scotland Yard. However, most of her appearances were supporting parts.

When Bachelor was 13, she studied drama in a school headed by Jessie Bonstelle.and she appeared in a professional show in Detroit. She also performed in productions at Newman School for Girls and Royal Oak High School.

Bachelor modeled clothes for dress shops and was a photographer's model in Detroit. She acted on stage in New York before she began performing in films.

Bachelor acted with the Penman Players in Detroit and performed on the Dramatized Book Review on CKLW radio. She was a member of a stock theater company whose show had closed when she visited Hollywood as a tourist. An agent invited her to test for a part in a film, and that led her her role in Lady of Burlesque.

In December 1946, Bachelor married Cornelius Vincent "Connie" Hurley, who owned and operated a casino in Las Vegas.

== Filmography ==
Year	Title	Role	Notes
1943	Lady of Burlesque	The Princess Nirvena	
1943	His Butler's Sister	Dot Stanley	
1944	Her Primitive Man	Marcia	
1944	Man from Frisco	Ruth Warnecke	
1944	Secrets of Scotland Yard	Sudan Ainger	
1944	The Port of 40 Thieves	Muriel Chaney	
1944	Experiment Perilous	Elaine	
1944	Lake Placid Serenade	Irene Cermak	
1945	Earl Carroll Vanities	Claire Elliott	
1945	Gangs of the Waterfront	Jane Rodgers	
1945	Scotland Yard Investigator	Tony Collison	
1946	Crime of the Century	Audrey Brandon	
1946	The Undercover Woman	Marcia Conroy	
1946	Passkey to Danger	Gwen Hughes	
1946	G.I. War Brides	Elizabeth Wunderlich	
1946	The Magnificent Rogue	Vera Lane	
1946	I've Always Loved You	Redhead	
1947	The Ghost Goes Wild	Irene Winters	
1947	Springtime in the Sierras	Jean Loring	
1947	Blackmail	Carla	
1948	Campus Honeymoon	Dean Carson	
1948	King of the Gamblers	Elsie Pringle	
1948	Sons of Adventure	Laura Gifford	
1948	Homicide for Three	Collette Rose - aka Madam Colette	(final film role)

== Bibliography ==
- Hanson, Helen. Hollywood Heroines: Women in Film Noir and the Female Gothic Film. I.B. Tauris, 2007.
