= Homicide for Three =

1948 film by George Blair

- Theatrical release poster
- Directed by: George Blair
- Screenplay by: Bradbury Foote; Albert DeMond
- Produced by: Stephen Auer
- Starring: Warren Douglas; Audrey Long; Grant Withers; Lloyd Corrigan; Stephanie Bachelor; George Lynn
- Cinematography: John MacBurnie
- Edited by: Harry Keller
- Music by: R. Dale Butts
- Production company: Republic Pictures
- Distributed by: Republic Pictures
- Release date: December 8, 1948
- Running time: 60 minutes
- Country: United States
- Language: English

Homicide for Three is a 1948 American crime film directed by George Blair and written by Bradbury Foote and Albert DeMond. The film stars Warren Douglas, Audrey Long, Grant Withers, Lloyd Corrigan, Stephanie Bachelor and George Lynn. The film was released on December 8, 1948 by Republic Pictures.

== Plot ==
A Navy Lieutenant on shore leave and his wife of one year can't find a hotel room to enjoy their first night alone since they eloped a year earlier. An oddly dressed women in the lobby gives up her room in "an act of charity". The Navy Lieutenant then has his white uniform stolen while he is in the steam bath: and is given a civilian suit by the house dick. Shortly thereafter, sitting at the bar together, the Navy Lieutenant and his wife are approached by a somewhat distinguished fellow guest who confuses Iris Duluth with "her cousin Mona" whose picture had appeared in that morning's paper.

== Cast ==
- Warren Douglas as Lt. Peter Duluth
- Audrey Long as Iris Duluth
- Grant Withers as Joe Hatch
- Lloyd Corrigan as Emmanuel Catt
- Stephanie Bachelor as Collette Rose
- George Lynn as Bill Daggett
- Tala Birell as Rita Brown
- Benny Baker as Timothy
- Joseph Crehan as Capt. Webb
- Sid Tomack as Cab Driver
- Dick Elliott as Doorman
- Eddie Dunn as Circus Doorman
- John Newland as Desk Clerk
- Billy Curtis as Billy Curtis
- Patsy Moran as Maid
