= But the Flesh Is Weak =

1932 film

- Robert Montgomery, Frederick Kerr and Heather Thatcher
- Directed by: Jack Conway
- Screenplay by: Ivor Novello
- Based on: The Truth Game by Ivor Novello
- Starring: Robert Montgomery; Nora Gregor; Heather Thatcher; Edward Everett Horton; C. Aubrey Smith; Nils Asther
- Cinematography: Oliver T. Marsh
- Edited by: Tom Held
- Production company: Metro-Goldwyn-Mayer
- Distributed by: Metro-Goldwyn-Mayer
- Release date: April 9, 1932
- Running time: 77 minutes
- Country: United States
- Language: English

But the Flesh Is Weak is a 1932 American pre-Code comedy film directed by Jack Conway and written by Ivor Novello based on his 1928 play The Truth Game. The film stars Robert Montgomery, Nora Gregor, Heather Thatcher, Edward Everett Horton, C. Aubrey Smith and Nils Asther. The film was released on April 9, 1932, by Metro-Goldwyn-Mayer. But the Flesh Is Weak was remade in 1941 as Free and Easy.

== Plot ==
Max Clement and his father Florian, short of money, take advantage of wealthy British women by romancing them. Max's problem is that he is far more attracted to more attractive women, ones without the means to support him.

While seeing a pleasant but plain Lady Joan Culver socially, Max is introduced to Austrian widow Rosine Brown, quickly falling in love with her. Max is persistent in his romantic advances, but Rosine reveals that she is penniless and, much like Max, counting on a richer but less exciting man, Sir George Kelvin, to marry and take care of her.

Florian's gambling losses in the casino leave him heavily in debt. The only way Max knows how to aid his father is by marrying Lady Joan, who can afford to solve his financial difficulties. Max's guilty conscience and true love lead him back to Rosine, and the sudden engagement of Florian to a wealthy woman helps bring everyone together.

== Cast ==
- Robert Montgomery as Max Clement
- Nora Gregor as Mrs. Rosine Brown
- Heather Thatcher as Lady Joan Culver
- Edward Everett Horton as Sir George Kelvin
- C. Aubrey Smith as Florian Clement
- Nils Asther as Prince Paul
- Frederick Kerr as Duke of Hampshire
- Eva Moore as Lady Florence Ridgway
- Forrester Harvey as Gooch
- Desmond Roberts as Findley
- Ray Milland as Mr. Stuart (an extra, briefly seen when Joan introduces Max to her friends at the party)
