= Warren Douglas =

American actor (1911–1997)

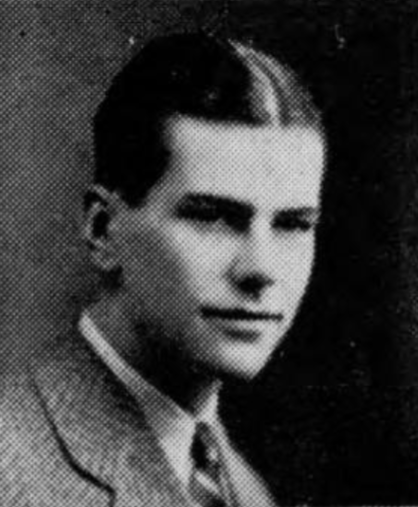
- Douglas in his 1929 high school yearbook
- Born: Warren Douglas Wandberg; July 29, 1911; Minneapolis, Minnesota, U.S.
- Died: November 15, 1997 (aged 86); Jackson, California, U.S.
- Occupations: Actor, writer
- Years active: 1938–1981 (film)

Warren Douglas (born Warren Douglas Wandberg; July 29, 1911 – November 15, 1997) was an American actor, novelist, lyricist, and screenwriter.

== Career ==
Douglas was born in Minneapolis, and a 1929 graduate of Minneapolis South High School. He later attended the Minneapolis College of Music.

Douglas' work on stage included work in local theater and acting in productions in summer stock theater. On Broadway, he had the role of Alec Dixon in Happily Ever After (1945).

Beginning in the 1950s, Douglas focused his efforts more on writing than on acting. He wrote two novels, The Man from Wells Fargo, and One Came Alone, in addition to 48 teleplays and screenplays. He also wrote the lyrics and books for the musicals Belle Starr, Go for Your Gun, and The Peaceful Palace.

On November 15, 1997, Douglas died of heart failure at the Kit Carson Rest Home in Jackson, California, at age 86.

== Partial filmography ==
- First Offenders (1939) – Tom
- City for Conquest (1940) – Elevator Operator (uncredited)
- Air Force (1943) – Hickam Field Control Officer (uncredited)
- Mission to Moscow (1943) – Emlen's Well-Wisher at Train Station (uncredited)
- Action in the North Atlantic (1943) – Navy Pilot (uncredited)
- Murder on the Waterfront (1943) – Joey Davis
- Adventure in Iraq (1943) – Doug Everett
- Northern Pursuit (1943) – Sergeant (scenes deleted)
- Destination Tokyo (1943) – Larry
- God Is My Co-Pilot (1945) – Bob Neale
- Pride of the Marines (1945) – Kebabian
- Below the Deadline (1946) – Joe Hilton
- The Inner Circle (1946) – Johnny Strange
- The Magnificent Rogue (1946) – Steve Morgan
- The Man I Love (1947) – Joe Brown
- The Pilgrim Lady (1947) – Dennis Carter
- High Conquest (1947) – Geoffrey Stevens
- The Trespasser (1947) – Danny 'Dan' Butler
- The Chinese Ring (1947) – Police Sgt. Bill Davidson
- Lightnin' in the Forest (1948) – David Lamont
- The Babe Ruth Story (1948) – Boston Braves' Rookie
- Incident (1949) – Joe Downey
- Homicide for Three (1948) – Lt. Peter Duluth
- Homicide (1949) – Brad Clifton
- Forgotten Women (1949) – John Allison
- Task Force (1949) – Winston – CIC Officer (uncredited)
- Post Office Investigator (1949) – Bill Mannerson
- Square Dance Katy (1950) – Bob Carson
- The Great Jewel Robber (1950) – Det. Altman (uncredited)
- County Fair (1950) – Tommy Blake
- The Admiral Was a Lady (1950) – Salesman (uncredited)
- Cuban Fireball (1951) – Tommy Pomeroy
- Secrets of Monte Carlo (1951) – Bill Whitfield
- Yellow Fin (1951) – Dr. Steve Elliott
- Northwest Territory (1951) – Dan Morgan
- Torpedo Alley (1952) – Minor Role (uncredited)
- Jack Slade (1953, writer)
- Fangs of the Arctic (1953) – Matt Oliver
- Cry Vengeance (1954) – Mike Walters
- Dragoon Wells Massacre (1957) – Jud
- The Helen Morgan Story (1957) – Mark Hellinger
- The Deep Six (1958) – Pilot
- The Night of the Grizzly (1966) – Minister (uncredited)
