= Free and Easy (1941 film) =

1941 film by George Sidney

- Film poster
- Directed by: George Sidney; Edward Buzzell (uncredited)
- Screenplay by: Marvin Borowsky
- Based on: The Truth Game; 1928 play by Ivor Novello
- Starring: Robert Cummings; Ruth Hussey; Judith Anderson; C. Aubrey Smith
- Cinematography: George J. Folsey; Charles Lawton, Jr.
- Edited by: Frank E. Hull
- Music by: Daniele Amfitheatrof
- Production company: Metro-Goldwyn-Mayer
- Distributed by: Loew's Inc.
- Release date: February 28, 1941
- Running time: 56 minutes
- Country: United States
- Language: English
- Budget: $244,000
- Box office: $333,000

Free and Easy is a 1941 American comedy film directed by George Sidney and starring Robert Cummings, Ruth Hussey, Judith Anderson and Nigel Bruce. Produced by Metro-Goldwyn-Mayer, the film is a remake of But the Flesh Is Weak (1932) in which Robert Montgomery and C. Aubrey Smith had appeared as the son-and-father team. Both films are based on the 1928 play The Truth Game by Ivor Novello.

== Cast ==
- Robert Cummings as Max Clemington
- Ruth Hussey as Martha Gray
- Judith Anderson as Lady Joan Culver
- C. Aubrey Smith as Duke Colver
- Nigel Bruce as Florian Clemington
- Charles Coleman as Powers, Culver's butler
- Reginald Owen as Sir Kelvin
- Teresa Maxwell-Conover as Lady Ridgeway
- Ernie Stanton as Duke's Horse Groom (uncredited)

== Production ==
It was George Sidney's first feature as director. "Nobody else on the lot would do it," he later said. He had worked at MGM since 1931 and been directing studio shorts and screen tests; two of his shorts won Oscars - Quicker 'n a Wink (1940) and Of Pups and Puzzles (1941). This enabled him to move up to features.

Sidney had directed Robert Cummings in a screen test in 1935.

Cummings was borrowed from Universal in December 1940. Filming started in late December 1940. The week before filming Edward Buzzell was to direct. However then Sidney stepped in. Filming ended in January 1941 though there were some reshoots later in the month.

== Reception ==
=== Critical ===
The Los Angeles Times said Cummings plays "a likable cad who isn't too likable outside of his own natural effervescence." The New York Times said it was made with "a lack of success... only Robert Cummings, as the bouncing hero, gives the impression of enjoying himself. And Mr Cummings's enthusiasm is of the bouncing, juvenile sort. So the whole thing adds up to a vapid and completely inconsequential charade."

In 1945 George Sidney told a reporter doing a profile on him that "I'm sure you missed [the film] and you were lucky if you did." One of Sidney's obituaries called it "a feeble comedy." However it did launch his career.

Filmink called it "a brief post-Philadelphia Story attempt to turn" Hussey "into a star... which no one much remembers."

=== Box office ===
According to MGM records the film earned $205,000 in the US and Canada and $128,000 elsewhere resulting in a loss of $33,000.
