= The Damned Don't Cry =

1950 film by Vincent Sherman

- Theatrical release poster
- Directed by: Vincent Sherman
- Screenplay by: Harold Medford; Jerome Weidman; Gertrude Walker
- Based on: Case History; 1950 novel by Gertrude Walker
- Produced by: Jerry Wald
- Starring: Joan Crawford; David Brian
- Cinematography: Ted McCord, A.S.C.
- Edited by: Rudi Fehr
- Music by: Daniele Amfitheatrof
- Color process: Black and white
- Production company: Warner Bros. Pictures
- Distributed by: Warner Bros. Pictures
- Release dates: April 7, 1950 (New York); May 5, 1950 (Los Angeles)
- Running time: 103 minutes
- Country: United States
- Language: English
- Budget: $1,233,000
- Box office: $2,211,000

The Damned Don't Cry (promoted as The Damned Don't Cry!) is a 1950 American film noir crime drama directed by Vincent Sherman and featuring Joan Crawford, David Brian and Steve Cochran. The plot concerns a woman's involvement with an organized-crime boss and his subordinates. The screenplay by Harold Medford and Jerome Weidman was based on the story "Case History" written by Gertrude Walker, loosely based on the relationship between Bugsy Siegel and Virginia Hill.

The Damned Don't Cry is the first of three cinematic collaborations between Sherman and Crawford along with Harriet Craig (1950) and Goodbye, My Fancy (1951).

== Plot ==
Ethel Whitehead lives in a squalid factory town with her husband and parents. After her young son dies in a tragic accident, she abandons her marriage and leaves town, determined to discover a worthwhile life. With no education or experience, she works at a low-wage job until she attracts the attention of a customer who invites her to model dresses at his department store. She soon sheds her morals to become an escort for wealthy clients on the side.

Ethel arranges a job for the store's mild-mannered, honest accountant Martin Blackford at the club where she usually entertains clients. Ethel gradually draws him into the criminal underworld by encouraging him to participate in a casino gambling plot masterminded by crime boss George Castleman. Martin initially balks at the idea, but Ethel encourages him to abandon his morals, arguing that money and power are the only things that matter in life, and that all people must look after themselves. In order to please Ethel, Martin agrees, and they kiss. However, Ethel reciprocates Castleman's romantic advances when meeting with him to discuss Martin's pay.

With Martin's assistance, Castleman's plans flourish, but he faces difficulties with former underling Nick Prenta, who is rumored to be planning a rebellion. Castleman orders Ethel to join Nick to discover his plans. Ethel poses as glamorous socialite Lorna Hansen Forbes and successfully seduces Nick, but she falls in love with him after learning of his circumstances. She is troubled when Martin informs her that Castleman intends to murder Nick if his suspicions about a rebellion are true. Ethel, who is disillusioned with Castleman, attends one of Nick's meetings and learns the names of the associates who intend to support his operation, but one of Nick's men recognizes her.

Ethel returns home to find Castleman and Martin waiting for her. Castleman bullies Ethel and accuses her of complicity in Nick's plan to eliminate him. Nick arrives to confront Ethel and Castleman informs him that Ethel had been acting as a mole, and Nick calls Ethel "a dirty tramp". A brief gunfight ensues and Nick is shot dead.

During the commotion, Ethel escapes in Nick's car. She returns home to her parents, but Martin soon locates her. He has told the police that Castleman murdered Nick and warns her that Castleman knows her location and intends to kill her as well. Before Ethel can escape, Castleman arrives and attempts to kill Martin. Ethel wrestles for the gun and is shot, while Martin kills Castleman. Ethel, wounded but alive, convalesces in bed as two reporters predict that she will try once more to emerge from her hometown.

== Cast ==
- Joan Crawford as Ethel Whitehead/Lorna Hansen Forbes
- David Brian as Joe Cavany/George Castleman
- Steve Cochran as Nick Prenta
- Kent Smith as Martin Blackford
- Hugh Sanders as Grady
- Selena Royle as Patricia Longworth
- Jacqueline deWit as Sandra
- Morris Ankrum as Mr. Whitehead
- Edith Evanson as Mrs. Castleman
- Richard Egan as Roy

== Production ==
Prior to production, the film's working title was The Victim. Exterior shots of the home and pool were filmed at Twin Palms, Frank Sinatra's Palm Springs home.

== Reception ==
In a contemporary review for The New York Times, critic Bosley Crowther wrote:

Take the old, true-confession formula, slick it up with some synthetic "class" and top it with gangster-film violence and you have yourself a notion of this show. For here we have sin and its wages (which are not too exorbitant, by the way) put forth in the old familiar pattern of make-believe "reality." Here we have Miss Crawford playing a frustrated laborer's wife who leaves her miserable surroundings for a self-aggrandizing career, working up in an underworld environment to the role of "fancy lady" to a big gang boss and then crashing back to the place of her origin when a mobsters' feud wipes out her man. And here we have, too, a. prime example of that sort of commercial hypocrisy which endows an obviout [sic] evildoer with glamor and sympathy. ... Vincent Sherman's direction is as specious as the script.

Critic Edwin Schallert of the Los Angeles Times wrote:

"The Damned Don't Cry" runs high in emotional fury in its climaxing scenes but keeps its balance because of strong staccato action. It also has the advantage of starting with a mystery air. It is decisively modern in its treatment, foregoing all lingerings on softer scenes. For what it is therefore the picture is eminently first-rate, and will have a count scored against it only by those who have through long usage become allergic to crime pictures of any type or description. "The Damned Don't Cry" has to be classed as such, even though it is of the finer grade.

According to Warner Bros., the film earned $1,540,000 in the U.S. and $671,000 in other markets. According to Variety, the film earned $1.4 million in the U.S. and Canada in 1950.
