= Anne O'Neal =

American actress (1893-1971)

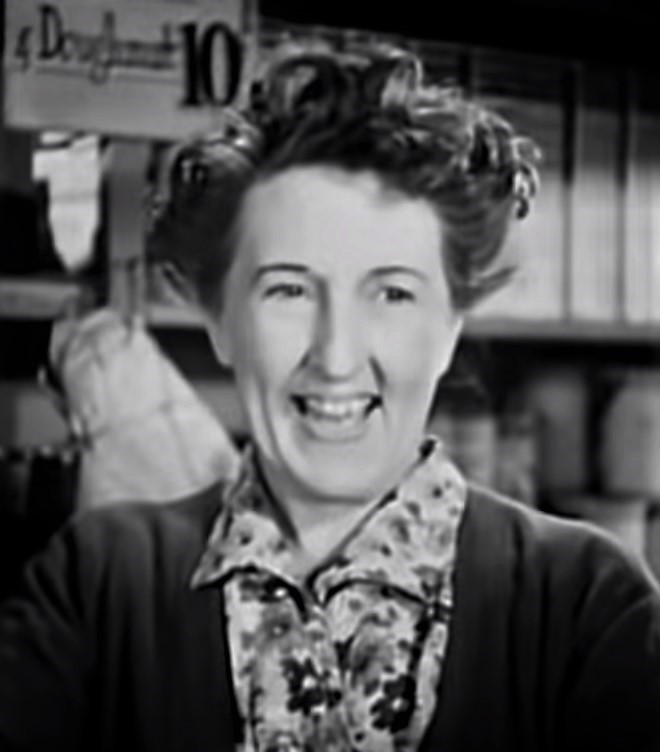
- O'Neal in The Missing Corpse (1945)
- Born: Patsy Ann Epperson; December 23, 1893; St. Louis, Missouri, U.S.
- Died: November 24, 1971 (aged 77); Woodland Hills, Los Angeles, California, U.S.
- Resting place: Forest Lawn Memorial Park, Glendale, California
- Occupation: Actress
- Years active: 1932–1962

Anne O'Neal (born Patsy Ann Epperson; December 23, 1893 – November 24, 1971) was an American actress. She appeared in many films portraying matronly landladies, for example.

On television, in 1957, she appeared on Gunsmoke as “Sabina Peavy”, a woman who ends up killing her abusive husband in the episode “Last Fling” (S2E26).

== Personal life ==
She died in 1971 at the age of 77 in Woodland Hills, California and is interred in Forest Lawn Memorial Park (Glendale).

== Partial filmography ==
- Strange Wives (1934)
- Bad Boy (1935)
- The Captain's Kid (1936)
- Stand-In (1937)
- Of Human Hearts (1938)
- The Adventures of Huckleberry Finn (1939)
- The Monster and the Girl (1941)
- Mr. District Attorney (1941)
- Blossoms in the Dust (1941)
- Sis Hopkins (1941)
- H. M. Pulham, Esq. (1941)
- Dr. Kildare's Victory (1942)
- In Old California (1942)
- Henry and Dizzy (1942)
- The Postman Didn't Ring (1942)
- The Magnificent Ambersons (1942)
- The Sombrero Kid (1942)
- The Man in the Trunk (1942)
- The Great Gildersleeve (1942)
- Henry Aldrich Gets Glamour (1943)
- Mexican Spitfire's Blessed Event (1943)
- Young Ideas (1943)
- I Dood It (1943)
- Swing Fever (1943)
- The Falcon and the Co-eds (1943)
- In Old Oklahoma (1943)
- Wilson (1944)
- Strangers in the Night (1944)
- Pillow to Post (1945)
- Three's a Crowd (1945)
- The Missing Corpse (1945)
- Lover Come Back (1946)
- Swell Guy (1946)
- The Fabulous Dorseys (1947)
- Miracle on 34th Street (1947)
- Cheyenne (1947)
- The Bishop's Wife (1947)
- Open Secret (1948)
- On Our Merry Way (1948)
- Black Bart (1948)
- Sitting Pretty (1948)
- Fighting Father Dunne (1948)
- Borrowed Trouble (1948)
- Good Sam (1948)
- The Snake Pit (1948)
- The Lone Ranger (TV series) episode 1/15 "Old Joe's Sister" (1949) as Abby.
- Adventure in Baltimore (1949)
- Lust for Gold (1949)
- The Sickle or the Cross (1949)
- Bride for Sale (1949)
- Gun Crazy (1950)
- Blonde Dynamite (1950)
- Belle of Old Mexico (1950)
- Annie Get Your Gun (1950)
- Armored Car Robbery (1950)
- Never a Dull Moment (1950)
- Ma and Pa Kettle Back on the Farm (1951)
- Wells Fargo Gunmaster (1951)
- The Lone Ranger (TV series) episode Rendezvous at Whipsaw (1954)
- Runaway Daughters (1956)
- The Rise and Fall of Legs Diamond (1960), among others.
