= Earl Carroll Vanities (film) =

1945 film by Joseph Santley

- Theatrical release poster
- Directed by: Joseph Santley
- Screenplay by: Frank Gill Jr.
- Story by: Cortland Fitzsimmons
- Produced by: Albert J. Cohen
- Starring: Dennis O'Keefe; Constance Moore; Eve Arden; Otto Kruger; Alan Mowbray; Stephanie Bachelor
- Cinematography: Jack A. Marta
- Edited by: Richard L. Van Enger
- Music by: Joseph Dubin; Walter Scharf
- Production company: Republic Pictures
- Distributed by: Republic Pictures
- Release date: April 5, 1945
- Running time: 91 minutes
- Country: United States
- Language: English

Earl Carroll Vanities is a 1945 American musical film directed by Joseph Santley and written by Frank Gill Jr. The film stars Dennis O'Keefe, Constance Moore, Eve Arden, Otto Kruger, Alan Mowbray and Stephanie Bachelor. It was released on April 5, 1945, by Republic Pictures.

The film's title refers to the real-life revue The Earl Carroll Vanities, but the film is not related to Earl Carroll Sketchbook, a film that would be released the following year.

The song "Endlessly" was nominated for the 1945 Academy Award for Best Original Song.

== Plot ==
Princess Drina returns to America where she was educated. She is traveling with her betrothed, the usually inebriated Grand Duke Paul, and with Queen Mother Elena, who wants Drina to secure a bank loan that will sustain their small republic economically.

Drina encounters Tex Donnelly, an American woman who runs a nightclub, and confides that her secret wish is to sing and dance. Tex's business partner and songwriter Danny Baldwin needs a replacement when the club's star entertainer, his girlfriend Claire Elliott, sprains an ankle. Tex offers Drina a chance to perform, and she is an instant success. Meanwhile, impresario Earl Carroll is seeking talent for his new revue, The Earl Carroll Vanities.

Danny and Claire resent the attention that Drina receives over the next two weeks, and Claire exposes the secret that Drina is actually royalty. Queen Elena insists that Drina give up showbusiness and return to her duties, but when Tex's master of ceremonies tricks her into one last appearance on stage, Drina is loved by everyone, including Danny.

== Cast ==
- Dennis O'Keefe as Danny Baldwin
- Constance Moore as Drina
- Eve Arden as Tex Donnelly
- Otto Kruger as Earl Carroll
- Alan Mowbray as Grand Duke Paul
- Stephanie Bachelor as Claire Elliott
- Pinky Lee as Pinky Price
- Mary Forbes as Queen Mother Elena
- Harry Parke as Walter
- Leon Belasco as Baron Dashek
- Parkyakarkus as Walter
- Tom Dugan as Waiter in Tex's Club
- Chester Clute as Mr. Weems
- Jimmy Alexander as Singer
- Tom London as Tom
- Beverly Lloyd as Cigarette Girl
- Edward Gargan as Policeman
- Robert Greig as Vonce
- Wilton Graff as Mr. Thayer
- Tommy Ivo as Tommy
- Liliane as Speciality Dancer
- Woody Herman and His Orchestra as Dance Band
- Mario as Speciality Dancer
