= The Pilgrim Lady =

1947 film by Lesley Selander

The Pilgrim Lady (1947)
- Directed by: Lesley Selander
- Written by: Dane Lussier
- Produced by: William J. O'Sullivan
- Starring: Lynne Roberts; Warren Douglas; Alan Mowbray
- Cinematography: Reggie Lanning
- Edited by: Arthur Roberts
- Music by: R. Dale Butts; Joseph Dubin; Mort Glickman
- Production company: Republic Pictures
- Distributed by: Republic Pictures
- Release date: January 22, 1947
- Running time: 67 minutes
- Country: United States
- Language: English

The Pilgrim Lady is a 1947 American comedy crime film directed by Lesley Selander and starring Lynne Roberts, Warren Douglas and Alan Mowbray.

== Cast ==
- Lynne Roberts as Henrietta Rankin aka Iris Fabian
- Warren Douglas as Dennis Carter
- Alan Mowbray as Clifford Latimer
- Veda Ann Borg as Eve Standish
- Clarence Kolb as Prof. Rankin
- Helen Freeman as Aunt Phoebe
- Doris Merrick as Millicent Rankin
- Russell Hicks as Thackery Gibbs
- Ray Walker as Blackie Reynolds
- Charles Coleman as Noel
- Carlyle Blackwell Jr. as Wayne Talbot III
- Harry Cheshire as Dr. Bekins
- Dorothy Christy as Nell Brown
- Paul E. Burns as Oscar
- Tom Dugan as Workman
- Jack Rice as Hotel Clerk
- William 'Billy' Benedict as Bellboy
- William Haade as Cab Driver
- Bob Alden as Bellboy
- Lois Austin as Lizette
- Bobby Barber as Elevator Operator
- Mary Field as Telephone Operator
- Shirley Karnes as Secretary
- Donald Kerr as Silent Waiter
- Max Linder as Hotel Doorman
- Harold Miller as Escort
- Beverlee Mitchell as Bacall-Type
- John S. Roberts as Elevator Operator
- Robert J. Wilke as Doorman

== Bibliography ==
- Len D. Martin. The Republic Pictures Checklist: Features, Serials, Cartoons, Short Subjects and Training Films of Republic Pictures Corporation, 1935-1959. McFarland, 1998.
