= Crime of the Century (1946 film) =

1946 American film directed by Philip Ford

- Directed by: Philip Ford
- Written by: William Hagens; O'Leta Rhinehart
- Starring: Stephanie Bachelor; Michael Browne; Martin Kosleck
- Cinematography: Reggie Lanning
- Distributed by: Republic Pictures
- Release date: February 28, 1946
- Running time: 56 minutes
- Country: United States
- Language: English

Crime of the Century is a 1946 American crime drama directed by Philip Ford. Ford was assigned as director by Republic Pictures after his directorial debut The Tiger Woman.

== Plot ==
Hank Rogers is released from prison after serving time for a minor crime. He arranges to meet his brother Jim, a newspaper reporter, in a bar, where Hank is distracted by attractive Audrey Brandon. His brother doesn't show up, and at Jim's apartment, Audrey drugs his drink, rendering Hank unconscious.

With his brother missing, Hank tracks him to the mansion of a wealthy industrialist, whose daughter Margaret Waldham eyes him suspiciously. Hank ultimately finds that the industrialist is dead, but being kept on ice by Margaret and her cronies, who also have made Jim their prisoner. Hank rescues his brother with Audrey's help, whereupon Jim jokingly invites him to meet again later at the same bar.

== Cast ==
- Stephanie Bachelor as Audrey Brandon
- Martin Kosleck as Paul
- Michael Browne as Hank Rogers
- Ray Walker as Jim Rogers
- Betty Shaw as Margaret
- Paul Stanton as Andrew Madison
- Mary Currier as Agatha Waldham
- Tom London as Dr. Jackson
- Ray Walker as Jim Rogers
- Don Costello as Joe, Bartender
- Earle Hodgins as Eddie
- Garry Owen as Taxi Driver
- Charles Cane as Ed Harris
- Charles C. Wilson as Police Lieutenant (as Charles Wilson)
- Frances Morris as Nurse
- David Fresco as Hotel Clerk
