= Secrets of Scotland Yard =

1944 film by George Blair

- Directed by: George Blair
- Written by: Denison Clift
- Produced by: George Blair
- Starring: Edgar Barrier; Stephanie Bachelor; C. Aubrey Smith; Lionel Atwill
- Cinematography: William Bradford
- Edited by: Fred Allen
- Music by: Charles Maxwell
- Production company: Republic Pictures
- Distributed by: Republic Pictures
- Release date: July 26, 1944
- Running time: 68 minutes
- Country: United States
- Language: English

Secrets of Scotland Yard is a 1944 American thriller film directed by George Blair and starring Edgar Barrier, Stephanie Bachelor and C. Aubrey Smith. The screenplay was by Denison Clift, adapting one of his own stories "Room 40, O.B." from Blue Book Magazine. It concerns a British police detective who goes undercover to root out a Nazi spy in Britain's decoding organization.

== Cast ==
- Edgar Barrier as John Usher / Robert Usher
- Stephanie Bachelor as Sudan Ainger
- C. Aubrey Smith as Sir Christopher Pelt
- Lionel Atwill as Waterlow
- Henry Stephenson as Sir Reginald Meade
- John Abbott as Mortimer Cope
- Walter Kingsford as Roylott Bevan
- Martin Kosleck as Josef
- Forrester Harvey as Alfred Morgan
- Frederick Worlock as Mason
- Matthew Boulton as Colonel Hedley
- Bobby Cooper as David Usher

== Critical reception ==
- Silentcomedymafia.com noted that director "Blair keeps up the pace and suspense perfectly well, giving the film a relatively expensive look when you know full well (Republic president) Herbert Yates is pinching every penny."
- In The Star-spangled Screen: The American World War II Film, Bernard F. Dick called the film "first-rate espionage and one of the studios classier efforts...Another instance of a minor film that shows considerably more intelligence than many major ones. It is the only film of the period to explain the techniques of Cryptoanalysis, particularly how page numbers of a book can provide the key to a code."

== Bibliography ==
- Dick, Bernard F. The Star-Spangled Screen: The American World War II Film. University Press of Kentucky, 1996.
- Glancy, H. Mark. When Hollywood Loved Britain: The Hollywood 'British' Film 1939-1945. Manchester University Press, 1999.
