= Eric Sinclair (actor) =

American actor (1922–2004)

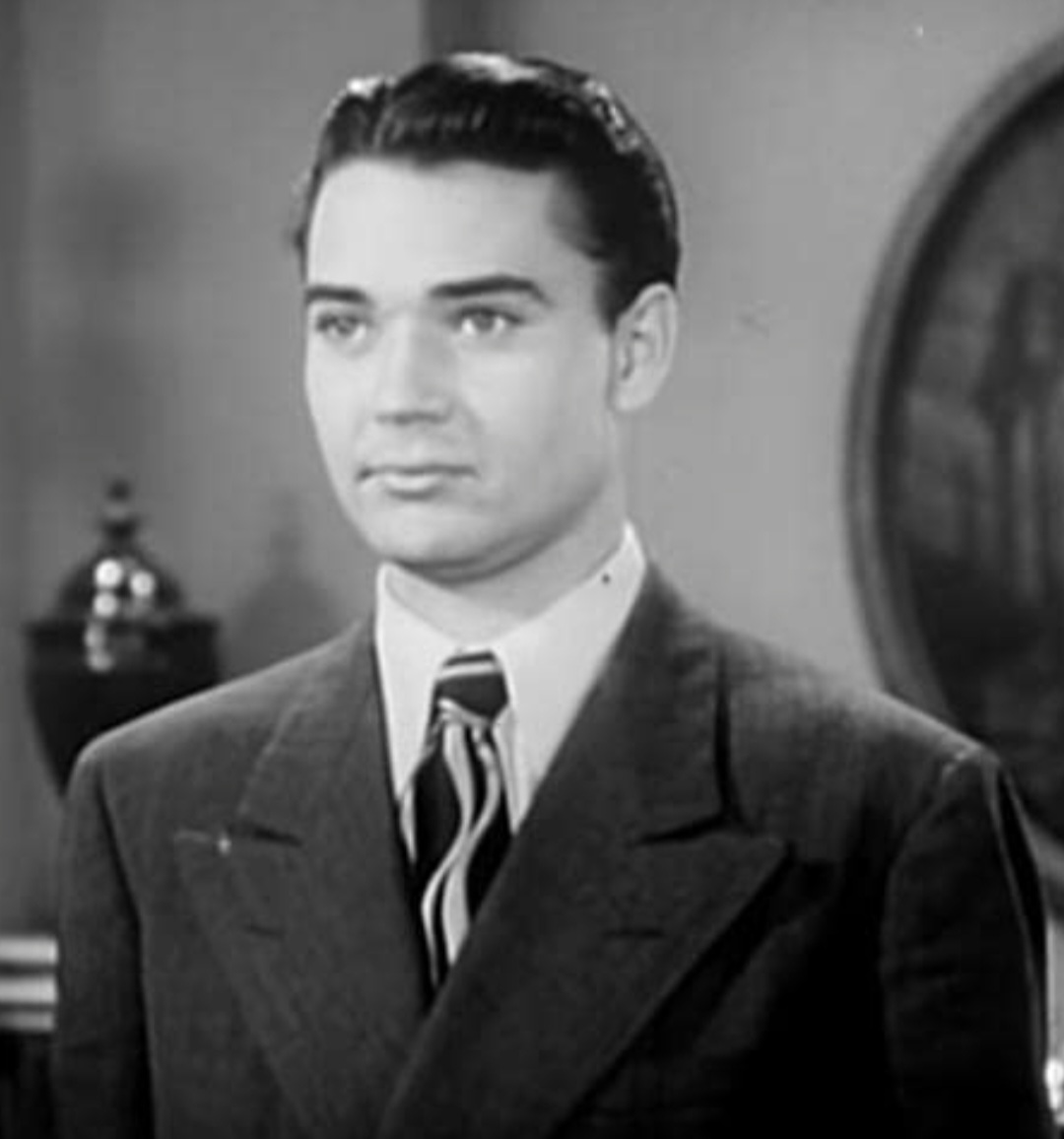
- Sinclair in The Missing Corpse (1945)
- Born: William Allison Walker; April 26, 1922; Grandfield, Oklahoma, U.S.
- Died: January 26, 2004 (aged 81); Los Angeles, California, U.S.
- Resting place: Kensico Cemetery, Valhalla, New York
- Occupation: Actor
- Years active: 1944–1991

Eric Sinclair (born William Allison Walker; April 26, 1922 – January 26, 2004) was an American film and television actor. He is best known for appearing in War of the Satellites (1959), Ma Barker's Killer Brood (1960) and Butch Cassidy and the Sundance Kid (1969).

Sinclair starred with Jane Withers in the film Faces in the Fog.

Sinclair died on January 26, 2004 in Los Angeles, California at the age of 81. He was buried in Kensico Cemetery in Valhalla, New York.

== Filmography ==
=== Film ===
Year	Title	Role	Notes
1944	Song of the Open Road	Bit Role	(uncredited)
1944	Since You Went Away	Voice in Convalescent Ward	(voice, uncredited)
1944	Faces in the Fog	Joe Mason	
1945	Youth on Trial	Denny Moore	
1945	The Missing Corpse	James Kruger	
1945	Club Havana	Jimmy Medford	
1947	Kilroy Was Here	Dick	
1950	Lonely Heart Bandits	Bobby Crane	
1950	Cyrano de Bergerac	Guardsman	
1951	That's My Boy	Student	(uncredited)
1951	Texas Carnival	Page Boy	(uncredited)
1951	The Unknown Man	Reporter	(uncredited)
1957	My Man Godfrey	Brent	(uncredited)
1959	War of the Satellites	Dr. Howard Lazar	
1960	Guns of the Timberland	Logger	(uncredited)
1960	Ma Barker's Killer Brood	John Dillinger	
1964	On Murder Considered as One of the Fine Arts		
1964	Weekend at Dunkirk		
1965	The Sandpiper	Beatnik	(uncredited)
1965	Three Rooms in Manhattan		(as Eric Sainclair)
1966	The Upper Hand		
1969	Justine	Male Baller	(uncredited)
1969	Butch Cassidy and the Sundance Kid	Tiffany's Salesman	
1970	Airport	David Knight - Passenger	(uncredited)
1972	The Cremators	Dr. Willy Seppel	(as Eric Allison)
1972	Pete 'n' Tillie	Party Guest	(uncredited)
1980	The Memory of Eva Ryker	Deck Officer	

=== Television ===
Year	Title	Role	Notes
1952	The Philco Television Playhouse	Drunk Friend	1 episode
1952-1954	Kraft Television Theatre	Benvolio	2 episodes
1953	Armstrong Circle Theatre		
1953	Encounter		1 episode
1954	Pond's Theater	Charlie	1 episode
1955	Producers' Showcase		1 episode
1955-1956	Robert Montgomery Presents	Malcolm Craig / Johnny / Matthew Anderson	9 episodes
1956-1957	Matinee Theatre	Edward Bancroft	2 episodes
1957	Perry Mason	Mark Cushing	1 episode
1958	How to Marry a Millionaire	Arthur Barnes	1 episode
1959	Sugarfoot	Roger Gills	1 episode
1959	Mike Hammer	James Hillary Jr. / Gary Milford	2 episode
1960	One Step Beyond	Secretary Hay	1 episode
1961	Coronado 9	Gil Chandler	1 episode
1961	Give Us Barabbas!	The Roman Officer	TV movie
1965	Days of Our Lives	Durand	1 episode
1968	Felony Squad	Lyn Amboy / Senator George Stoker	1 episodes
1972	The F.B.I.		1 episode
1979	The Rockford Files	Butler	1 episode
1984	Paper Dolls	Distinguished Man	1 episode
1988	Moonlighting	Costumer #1	1 episode
1991	Dynasty: The Reunion	Capt. at Swiss Resort	1 episode
