= Dane Lussier =

American screenwriter

- Born: December 23, 1909; Spokane, Washington, United States
- Died: October 10, 1959 (aged 49); Los Angeles, California, United States
- Other name: Dane Richard Lussier
- Occupation: Writer
- Years active: 1943–1957

Dane Lussier (December 23, 1909 – October 10, 1959) was an American screenwriter. He was the father of songwriter Deke Richards.

== Selected filmography ==
- Ladies' Day (1943)
- Storm Over Lisbon (1944)
- A Sporting Chance (1945)
- The Falcon's Alibi (1946)
- Dick Tracy vs. Cueball (1946)
- Smooth as Silk (1946)
- The Pilgrim Lady (1947)
- My Dream Is Yours (1949)
- Family Honeymoon (1949)
- It Happens Every Thursday (1953)

== Bibliography ==
- Martin, Len D. The Republic Pictures Checklist: Features, Serials, Cartoons, Short Subjects and Training Films of Republic Pictures Corporation, 1935-1959. McFarland, 1998.
