= George Blair (director) =

American film director (1905–1970)

- Born: December 6, 1905; United States
- Died: April 19, 1970 (aged 64); Los Angeles, California; United States
- Occupations: Director, producer
- Years active: 1933–1961

George Blair (December 6, 1905 – April 19, 1970) was an American film director who worked generally on supporting features including many B-Westerns. Two of his earliest films were British-set thriller films starring C. Aubrey Smith, made for Republic Pictures.

Television programs that Blair directed included Brave Eagle.

== Selected filmography ==
Director

- Secrets of Scotland Yard (1944)
- A Sporting Chance (1945)
- Scotland Yard Investigator (1945)
- Gangs of the Waterfront (1945)
- Affairs of Geraldine (1946)
- That's My Gal (1947)
- The Trespasser (1947)
- Exposed (1947)
- Madonna of the Desert (1948)
- Lightnin' in the Forest (1948)
- King of the Gamblers (1948)
- Daredevils of the Clouds (1948)
- Homicide for Three (1948)
- Rose of the Yukon (1949)
- Duke of Chicago (1949)
- Streets of San Francisco (1949)
- Under Mexicali Stars (1950)
- Silver City Bonanza (1951)
- Secrets of Monte Carlo (1951)
- Desert Pursuit (1952)
- Perils of the Jungle (1953)
- Superman in Scotland Yard (1954)
- Sabu and the Magic Ring (1957)
- The Hypnotic Eye (1960)

=== TV series ===
- Adventures of Superman (1953-1958, TV series, 27 episodes
- Casey Jones (1957-1958, TV series, 23 episodes)
- Highway Patrol (1957, TV series, 2 episodes)
- Harbor Command (1958, TV series, 1 episode)
- Tales of the Texas Rangers (1958, TV series, 7 episodes)
- Death Valley Days (1959, TV series, 1 episode)
- Lassie (1959–1960, TV series, 3 episodes)
- Bonanza (1960, TV series, 1 episode)
- Wanted: Dead or Alive (1960, TV series, 10 episodes)
- Stagecoach West (1961, TV series, 2 episodes)
- The Littlest Hobo (1963, TV series, 1 episode)
- The Adventures of Superboy (1996, TV series)

=== TV shorts ===
- Beach Patrol (1959, TV short)
- The Adventures of Superboy (1961, TV short)

== Bibliography ==
- Richards, Jeffrey. Visions of Yesterday. Routledge, 1973.
