= Mort Glickman =

American composer (1898–1953)

- Born: December 6, 1898; Chicago, Illinois, United States
- Died: February 27, 1953 (aged 54); Sherman Oaks, California, United States
- Occupation: Composer
- Years active: 1940–1953 (film)

Mort Glickman (December 6, 1898 – February 27, 1953) was an American composer of film scores. He spent most of his career writing scores (often uncredited) for Republic Pictures, where he contributed to more than 175 films.

== Selected filmography ==
- Rookies on Parade (1941)
- Mercy Island (1941)
- Joan of Ozark (1942)
- The Girl from Alaska (1942)
- Days of Old Cheyenne (1943)
- Black Hills Express (1943)
- The Purple V (1943)
- San Fernando Valley (1944)
- Don't Fence Me In (1945)
- The Man from Oklahoma (1945)
- Along the Navajo Trail (1945)
- The Mysterious Mr. Valentine (1946)
- Stagecoach to Denver (1946)
- The Pilgrim Lady (1947)
- King of the Gamblers (1948)
- The Longhorn (1951)
- Rose of Cimarron (1952)
- Invaders from Mars (1953)

== Bibliography ==
- William C. Cline. In the Nick of Time: Motion Picture Sound Serials. McFarland, 1997.
