= List of American films of 1950 =

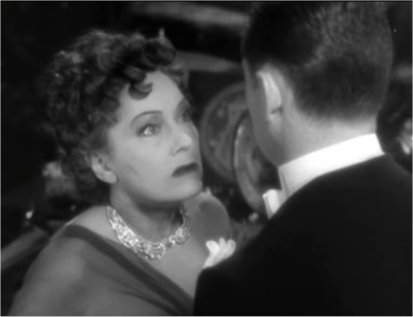
Gloria Swanson and William Holden in Sunset Boulevard

More than 383 U.S. produced feature films were released in 1950.

Fred Astaire hosted the 23rd Academy Awards ceremony on March 29, 1951, held at the RKO Pantages Theatre in Hollywood. The winner of the Best Motion Picture category was Twentieth Century-Fox's All About Eve.

The other four nominated pictures were Born Yesterday, Father of the Bride, King Solomon's Mines and Sunset Boulevard.

All About Eve was nominated for 14 Oscars, beating the previous record of Gone with the Wind (13).

Newcomer Judy Holliday won the Oscar for Best Actress for her portrayal of showgirl mistress Billie Dawn in the film version of the play Born Yesterday, a role which she had originated on Broadway. Other Best Actress nominees for that year were Bette Davis and Anne Baxter for All About Eve, Eleanor Parker for Caged and Gloria Swanson for Sunset Boulevard.

José Ferrer won the Oscar for Best Actor for his role as the title character in the film version of the 1946 Broadway play, Cyrano de Bergerac, a role which he had played on Broadway. Other nominees that year were Louis Calhern for The Magnificent Yankee, William Holden for Sunset Boulevard, James Stewart for Harvey and Spencer Tracy for Father of the Bride.

The 8th Golden Globe Awards also honored the best films of 1950. That year's Golden Globes also marked the first time that the Best Actor and Actress categories were split into Musical or Comedy or Drama. However, Best Picture remained a single category until the 9th Golden Globe Awards, when it too was split into two categories. Ferrer won the Golden Globe for Best Actor – Motion Picture – Drama, for Cyrano de Bergerac, while Fred Astaire won Best Actor – Motion Picture – Musical or Comedy for Three Little Words. Swanson won Best Actress – Motion Picture – Drama for Sunset Boulevard, while Holliday won for Best Actress – Motion Picture – Musical or Comedy for Born Yesterday. Sunset Boulevard won the Golden Globe for Best Motion Picture.

1950 also saw the film debut of several future stars, such as Marlon Brando, Charlton Heston, Sidney Poitier, Piper Laurie and Debbie Reynolds.

== A-B ==
Title	Director	Cast	Genre	Notes
711 Ocean Drive	Joseph M. Newman	Edmond O'Brien, Joanne Dru, Dorothy Patrick	Crime drama	Columbia
Abbott and Costello in the Foreign Legion	Charles Lamont	Abbott and Costello, Patricia Medina, Walter Slezak	Comedy	Universal
Across the Badlands	Fred F. Sears	Charles Starrett, Smiley Burnette, Helen Mowery	Western	Columbia
The Admiral Was a Lady	Albert S. Rogell	Edmond O'Brien, Wanda Hendrix, Steve Brodie	Comedy	United Artists
All About Eve	Joseph L. Mankiewicz	Bette Davis, Anne Baxter, Gary Merrill,	Drama	20th Century Fox; Academy Award for Best Picture
Ambush	Sam Wood	Robert Taylor, John Hodiak, Arlene Dahl	Western	MGM. Wood's last film
American Guerrilla in the Philippines	Fritz Lang	Tyrone Power, Micheline Presle, Tom Ewell	War	20th Century Fox
Annie Get Your Gun	George Sidney	Betty Hutton, Howard Keel, Louis Calhern	Musical	MGM. Based on 1946 musical; 4 Oscar nominations
The Arizona Cowboy	R. G. Springsteen	Rex Allen, Teala Loring, Gordon Jones	Western	Republic
Arizona Territory	Wallace Fox	Whip Wilson, Andy Clyde, Nancy Saunders	Western	Monogram
Armored Car Robbery	Richard Fleischer	Charles McGraw, Adele Jergens, William Talman	Film noir	RKO. Among first heist films
The Asphalt Jungle	John Huston	Sterling Hayden, Louis Calhern, Jean Hagen	Film noir	MGM; 4 Oscar nominations
At War with the Army	Hal Walker	Dean Martin, Jerry Lewis, Polly Bergen	Musical comedy	Paramount; first starring roles for Martin and Lewis, Bergen
The Avengers	John H. Auer	Adele Mara, John Carroll, Fernando Lamas	Adventure	Republic
Backfire	Vincent Sherman	Edmond O'Brien, Virginia Mayo, Gordon MacRae	Crime thriller	Warner Bros.
The Bandit Queen	William Berke	Barbara Britton, Willard Parker, Phillip Reed	Western	Lippert
The Baron of Arizona	Samuel Fuller	Vincent Price, Ellen Drew, Vladimir Sokoloff	Western drama	Lippert
Barricade	Peter Godfrey	Ruth Roman, Raymond Massey, Dane Clark	Western	Warner Bros.
Battling Marshal	Oliver Drake	Sunset Carson, Lee Roberts, Pat Starling	Western	Astor
Beauty on Parade	Lew Landers	Robert Hutton, Ruth Warrick, Lola Albright	Drama	Columbia
Belle of Old Mexico	R. G. Springsteen	Estelita Rodriguez, Robert Rockwell, Dorothy Patrick	Musical comedy	Republic Pictures
Bells of Coronado	William Witney	Roy Rogers, Dale Evans, Grant Withers	Western	Republic
Between Midnight and Dawn	Gordon Douglas	Edmond O'Brien, Gale Storm, Mark Stevens	Crime thriller	Columbia
Beware of Blondie	Edward Bernds	Penny Singleton, Arthur Lake, Adele Jergens	Comedy	Columbia. Last of 28-film series
Beyond the Purple Hills	John English	Gene Autry, Jo-Carroll Dennison, Don Beddoe	Western	Columbia
The Big Hangover	Norman Krasna	Elizabeth Taylor, Van Johnson, Leon Ames	Comedy	MGM
The Big Lift	George Seaton	Montgomery Clift, Paul Douglas, Cornell Borchers	War	20th Century Fox. Shot in Berlin
Black Hand	Richard Thorpe	Gene Kelly, Teresa Celli, J. Carrol Naish	Crime drama	MGM
Black Jack	Julien Duvivier	George Sanders, Herbert Marshall, Patricia Roc	Adventure	Independent
The Black Rose	Henry Hathaway	Tyrone Power, Orson Welles, Jack Hawkins	Historical	20th Century Fox. Co-production with UK
The Blazing Sun	John English	Gene Autry, Lynne Roberts, Anne Gwynne	Western	Columbia
Blonde Dynamite	William Beaudine	Leo Gorcey, Huntz Hall, Adele Jergens	Comedy	Monogram
Blondie's Hero	Edward Bernds	Penny Singleton, Arthur Lake, William Frawley	Comedy	Columbia
Blue Grass of Kentucky	William Beaudine	Bill Williams, Jane Nigh, Ralph Morgan	Western	Monogram
Blues Busters	William Beaudine	Bowery Boys, Adele Jergens, Phyllis Coates	Comedy	Monogram
Border Outlaws	Richard Talmadge	Spade Cooley, Maria Hart, Bill Edwards	Western	Eagle-Lion
Borderline	William A. Seiter	Fred MacMurray, Claire Trevor, Raymond Burr	Film noir	Universal
Border Rangers	William Berke	Don "Red" Barry, Robert Lowery, Pamela Blake	Western	Lippert
Border Treasure	George Archainbaud	Tim Holt, Jane Nigh, Richard Martin	Western	RKO
Born to Be Bad	Nicholas Ray	Joan Fontaine, Robert Ryan, Zachary Scott	Drama	RKO. Based on novel All Kneeling
Born Yesterday	George Cukor	William Holden, Judy Holliday, Broderick Crawford	Comedy	Columbia. Oscar for Holliday; Remade in 1993
Boy from Indiana	John Rawlins	Lon McCallister, Lois Butler, Billie Burke	Sports	Eagle-Lion
Branded	Rudolph Maté	Alan Ladd, Mona Freeman, Charles Bickford	Western	Paramount. Remake of 1931 film
The Breaking Point	Michael Curtiz	John Garfield, Patricia Neal, Phyllis Thaxter	Film noir	Warner Bros. Based on novel To Have and Have Not
Breakthrough	Lewis Seiler	David Brian, John Agar, Frank Lovejoy	War	Warner Bros.
Bright Leaf	Michael Curtiz	Gary Cooper, Lauren Bacall, Patricia Neal	Drama	Warner Bros.
Broken Arrow	Delmer Daves	James Stewart, Jeff Chandler, Debra Paget	Western	20th Century Fox. 3 Oscar nominations
Buccaneer's Girl	Frederick de Cordova	Yvonne De Carlo, Philip Friend, Robert Douglas	Adventure	Universal
Bunco Squad	Herbert I. Leeds	Robert Sterling, Joan Dixon, Ricardo Cortez	Crime	RKO

== C-D ==
Title	Director	Cast	Genre	Notes
Caged	John Cromwell	Eleanor Parker, Agnes Moorehead, Lee Patrick	Film noir	Warner Bros. 3 Oscar nominations
California Passage	Joseph Kane	Forrest Tucker, Adele Mara, Estelita Rodriguez	Western	Republic
Call of the Klondike	Frank McDonald	Kirby Grant, Anne Gwynne, Lynne Roberts	Western	Monogram
Captain Carey, U.S.A.	Mitchell Leisen	Alan Ladd, Wanda Hendrix, Francis Lederer	Film noir	Paramount. Oscar for Best Song.
Captain China	Lewis R. Foster	John Payne, Gail Russell, Jeffrey Lynn	Adventure	Paramount
Captive Girl	William Berke	Johnny Weissmuller, Buster Crabbe, Rick Vallin	Adventure	Columbia
The Capture	John Sturges	Lew Ayres, Teresa Wright, Jacqueline White	Western	RKO
Cargo to Capetown	Earl McEvoy	Broderick Crawford, John Ireland, Ellen Drew	Adventure	Columbia
The Cariboo Trail	Edwin L. Marin	Randolph Scott, Karin Booth, George "Gabby" Hayes	Western	20th Century Fox
Chain Gang	Lew Landers	Douglas Kennedy, Marjorie Lord, Emory Parnell	Crime	Columbia
Chain Lightning	Stuart Heisler	Humphrey Bogart, Eleanor Parker, Raymond Massey	Drama	Warner Bros.
Champagne for Caesar	Richard Whorf	Ronald Colman, Celeste Holm, Vincent Price	Comedy	United Artists
Cheaper by the Dozen	Walter Lang	Clifton Webb, Myrna Loy, Jeanne Crain	Comedy	20th Century Fox. Based on 1948 novel; sequel in 1952; remade in 2003
Cherokee Uprising	Lewis D. Collins	Whip Wilson, Andy Clyde, Lois Hall	Western	Monogram
Cinderella	3 directors	Ilene Woods, Eleanor Audley, Verna Felton	Animation	Disney
Code of the Silver Sage	Fred C. Brannon	Allan Lane, Kay Christopher, Roy Barcroft	Western	Republic
Colorado Ranger	Thomas Carr	James Ellison, Russell Hayden, Julie Adams	Western	Lippert
Colt .45	Edwin L. Marin	Randolph Scott, Ruth Roman, Zachary Scott	Western	Warner Bros.
Comanche Territory	George Sherman	Maureen O'Hara, Macdonald Carey, Charles Drake	Western	Universal
Convicted	Henry Levin	Glenn Ford, Broderick Crawford, Dorothy Malone	Film noir	Columbia. Based on play The Criminal Code
Copper Canyon	John Farrow	Ray Milland, Hedy Lamarr, Mona Freeman	Western	Paramount
Counterspy Meets Scotland Yard	Seymour Friedman	Howard St. John, Ron Randell, Amanda Blake	Crime	Columbia
County Fair	William Beaudine	Rory Calhoun, Jane Nigh, Raymond Hatton	Drama	Monogram
Covered Wagon Raid	R. G. Springsteen	Allan Lane, Lyn Thomas, Eddy Waller	Western	Republic
Cow Town	John English	Gene Autry, Gail Davis, Harry Shannon	Western	Columbia
Crisis	Richard Brooks	Cary Grant, José Ferrer, Paula Raymond	Film-noir	MGM. Based on short story The Doubters
Crooked River	Thomas Carr	James Ellison, Russell Hayden, Julie Adams	Western	Lippert
Cry Murder	Jack Glenn	Carole Mathews, Jack Lord, Howard Smith	Crime	Film Classics
Curtain Call at Cactus Creek	Charles Lamont	Donald O'Connor, Walter Brennan, Gale Storm	Comedy	Universal
Customs Agent	Seymour Friedman	William Eythe, Marjorie Reynolds, Griff Barnett	Crime	Columbia
Cyrano de Bergerac	Michael Gordon	José Ferrer, Mala Powers, William Prince	Adventure	United Artists. Oscar for Best Actor
D.O.A.	Rudolph Maté	Edmond O'Brien, Pamela Britton, Beverly Garland	Film noir	United Artists; remade in 1988
Dakota Lil	Lesley Selander	George Montgomery, Marie Windsor, Rod Cameron	Western	20th Century Fox
Dallas	Stuart Heisler	Gary Cooper, Ruth Roman, Raymond Massey	Western	Warner Bros.
The Daltons' Women	Thomas Carr	Lash LaRue, Jack Holt, Pamela Blake	Western	Realart
The Damned Don't Cry	Vincent Sherman	Joan Crawford, David Brian, Steve Cochran	Film noir	Warner Bros. Based on story by Gertrude Walker
Dark City	William Dieterle	Charlton Heston, Lizabeth Scott, Viveca Lindfors	Film noir	Paramount.
The Daughter of Rosie O'Grady	David Butler	June Haver, Gordon MacRae, Debbie Reynolds	Musical	Warner Bros.
David Harding, Counterspy	Ray Nazarro	Willard Parker, Audrey Long, Harlan Warde	Film noir	Columbia
Davy Crockett, Indian Scout	Lew Landers	George Montgomery, Ellen Drew, Phillip Reed	Western	United Artists
Deported	Robert Siodmak	Märta Torén, Jeff Chandler, Claude Dauphin	Film noir	Universal
The Desert Hawk	Frederick de Cordova	Yvonne De Carlo, Richard Greene, Rock Hudson	Adventure	Universal
Destination Big House	George Blair	Dorothy Patrick, Robert Rockwell, Robert Armstrong	Crime	Republic
Destination Moon	Irving Pichel	John Archer Dick Wesson, Warner Anderson	Science fiction	Eagle-Lion
Destination Murder	Edward L. Cahn	Joyce MacKenzie, Stanley Clements, Hurd Hatfield	Film noir	RKO
Devil's Doorway	Anthony Mann	Robert Taylor, Louis Calhern, Paula Raymond	Western	MGM
Dial 1119	Gerald Mayer	Marshall Thompson, Virginia Field, Sam Levene	Film noir	MGM
Double Deal	Abby Berlin	Marie Windsor, Richard Denning, Fay Baker	Crime drama	RKO
Duchess of Idaho	Robert Z. Leonard	Van Johnson, Esther Williams, Paula Raymond	Musical	MGM
The Du Pont Story	Wilhelm Thiele	Eduard Franz, Sigrid Gurie, Tom Neal	Biographical	Independent
Dynamite Pass	Lew Landers	Tim Holt, Lynne Roberts, Richard Martin	Western	RKO

== E-F ==
Title	Director	Cast	Genre	Notes
The Eagle and the Hawk	Lewis R. Foster	John Payne, Rhonda Fleming, Dennis O'Keefe	Western	Paramount
Edge of Doom	Mark Robson	Dana Andrews, Farley Granger, Joan Evans	Film noir	RKO
Emergency Wedding	Edward Buzzell	Barbara Hale, Larry Parks, Willard Parker	Comedy	Columbia
Everybody's Dancin'	Will Jason	Spade Cooley, Barbara Woodell, Dick Lane	Musical	Lippert
Experiment Alcatraz	Edward L. Cahn	Joan Dixon, John Howard, Walter Kingsford	Drama	RKO
Fancy Pants	George Marshall	Lucille Ball, Bob Hope, Bruce Cabot	Comedy	Paramount
Fast on the Draw	Thomas Carr	James Ellison, Russell Hayden, Julie Adams	Western	Lippert
Father Is a Bachelor	Abby Berlin, Norman Foster	William Holden, Coleen Gray, Stuart Erwin	Romantic comedy	Columbia
Father of the Bride	Vincente Minnelli	Spencer Tracy, Elizabeth Taylor, Joan Bennett,	Comedy	MGM. 3 Oscar nominations; sequel in 1951; remade in 1991
Father Makes Good	Jean Yarbrough	Raymond Walburn, Walter Catlett, Mary Stuart	Comedy	Monogram
Father's Wild Game	Herbert I. Leeds	Raymond Walburn, Walter Catlett, Barbara Brown	Comedy	Monogram
Federal Agent at Large	George Blair	Dorothy Patrick, Robert Rockwell, Estelita Rodriguez	Crime	Republic
Federal Man	Robert Emmett Tansey	William Henry, Pamela Blake, Movita Castaneda	Thriller	Eagle-Lion
Fence Riders	Wallace Fox	Whip Wilson, Andy Clyde, Reno Browne	Western	Monogram
The Fighting Stallion	Robert Emmett Tansey	Bill Edwards, Doris Merrick, Forrest Taylor	Western	Eagle-Lion
The File on Thelma Jordon	Robert Siodmak	Wendell Corey, Barbara Stanwyck, Joan Tetzel	Film noir	Paramount
The Fireball	Tay Garnett	Mickey Rooney, Pat O'Brien, Beverly Tyler	Drama	20th Century Fox
The Flame and the Arrow	Jacques Tourneur	Burt Lancaster, Virginia Mayo, Robert Douglas	Adventure	Warner Bros.
The Flying Missile	Henry Levin	Glenn Ford, Viveca Lindfors, Henry O'Neill	War	Columbia
The Flying Saucer	Mikel Conrad	Mikel Conrad, Roy Engel, Denver Pyle	Science fiction	Film Classics. First film with flying saucers
For Heaven's Sake	George Seaton	Clifton Webb, Joan Bennett, Robert Cummings	Fantasy comedy	20th Century Fox. Adapted from play May We Come In?
Forbidden Jungle	Robert Emmett Tansey	Don C. Harvey, Forrest Taylor, Robert Cabal	Adventure	Eagle-Lion
Fortunes of Captain Blood	Gordon Douglas	Louis Hayward, Patricia Medina, Dona Drake	Adventure	Columbia. Remake of 1935's Captain Blood
Francis	Arthur Lubin	Donald O'Connor, Patricia Medina, ZaSu Pitts	Comedy	Universal. Launched "Talking Mule" series
Frenchie	Louis King	Shelley Winters, Joel McCrea, Marie Windsor	Western	Universal. Loosely based on Destry Rides Again
Frisco Tornado	R. G. Springsteen	Allan Lane, Martha Hyer, Eddy Waller	Western	Republic
Frontier Outpost	Ray Nazarro	Charles Starrett, Lois Hall, Steve Darrell	Western	Columbia
The Fuller Brush Girl	Lloyd Bacon	Lucille Ball, Eddie Albert, Gale Robbins	Comedy	Columbia. Cameo by Red Skelton
The Furies	Anthony Mann	Walter Huston, Barbara Stanwyck, Wendell Corey	Western film noir	Paramount. Huston's last performance

== G-H ==
Title	Director	Cast	Genre	Notes
The Girl from San Lorenzo	Derwin Abrahams	Duncan Renaldo, Leo Carrillo, Byron Foulger	Western	United Artists
Girls' School	Lew Landers	Joyce Reynolds, Ross Ford, Kasey Rogers	Drama	Columbia
The Glass Menagerie	Irving Rapper	Jane Wyman, Kirk Douglas, Gertrude Lawrence	Drama	Warner Bros.
The Golden Gloves Story	Felix E. Feist	James Dunn, Dewey Martin, Gregg Sherwood	Drama	Eagle-Lion
The Good Humor Man	Lloyd Bacon	Jack Carson, Lola Albright, George Reeves	Comedy	Columbia
The Great Jewel Robber	Peter Godfrey	David Brian, Marjorie Reynolds, John Archer	Crime	Warner Bros.
The Great Plane Robbery	Edward L. Cahn	Tom Conway, Steve Brodie, Lynne Roberts	Drama	United Artists
The Great Rupert	Irving Pichel	Jimmy Durante, Tom Drake, Terry Moore	Comedy	Eagle-Lion
Guilty Bystander	Joseph Lerner	Zachary Scott, Faye Emerson, Mary Boland	Film noir	Film Classics
Guilty of Treason	Felix E. Feist	Charles Bickford, Bonita Granville, Paul Kelly	Drama	Eagle-Lion
Gun Crazy	Joseph H. Lewis	Peggy Cummins, John Dall, Berry Kroeger	Film noir	United Artists.
The Gunfighter	Henry King	Gregory Peck, Helen Westcott, Karl Malden	Western	20th Century Fox
Gunfire	William Berke	Don "Red" Barry, Robert Lowery, Pamela Blake	Western	Lippert
Gunmen of Abilene	Fred C. Brannon	Allan Lane, Eddy Waller, Roy Barcroft	Western	Republic
Gunslingers	Wallace Fox	Whip Wilson, Andy Clyde, Reno Browne	Western	Monogram
The Happy Years	William A. Wellman	Dean Stockwell, Leo G. Carroll, Leon Ames	Comedy	MGM
Harbor of Missing Men	R. G. Springsteen	Richard Denning, Barbra Fuller, Steven Geray	Action	Columbia
Harriet Craig	Vincent Sherman	Joan Crawford, Wendell Corey, Lucile Watson	Horror	Columbia. Based on the 1925 play Craig's Wife
Harvey	Henry Koster	James Stewart, Josephine Hull, Peggy Dow	Fantasy comedy	Universal. Based on the 1944 play; Academy Award for Hull
He's a Cockeyed Wonder	Peter Godfrey	Mickey Rooney, Terry Moore, William Demarest	Comedy	Columbia
Hi-Jacked	Sam Newfield	Jim Davis, Marcia Mae Jones, Paul Cavanagh	Film noir	Lippert
The Hidden City	Ford Beebe	Johnny Sheffield, Sue England, Leon Belasco	Adventure	Monogram
High Lonesome	Alan Le May	John Drew Barrymore, John Archer, Kristine Miller	Western	Eagle-Lion Films
Highway 301	Andrew L. Stone	Steve Cochran, Virginia Grey, Gaby André	Film noir	Warner Bros.
Hills of Oklahoma	R. G. Springsteen	Rex Allen, Elisabeth Fraser, Elisabeth Risdon	Western	Republic
Hit Parade of 1951	John H. Auer	Marie McDonald, John Carroll, Estelita Rodriguez	Musical	Republic
Hoedown	Ray Nazarro	Eddy Arnold, Jeff Donnell, Jock Mahoney	Musical	Columbia
Holiday Rhythm	Jack Scholl	Mary Beth Hughes, Tex Ritter, Wally Vernon	Musical	Lippert
Hollywood Varieties	Paul Landres	Robert Alda, Peggy Stewart, Glen Vernon	Musical	Lippert
Hostile Country	Thomas Carr	James Ellison, Russell Hayden, Julie Adams	Western	Lippert
Hot Rod	Lewis D. Collins	Jimmy Lydon, Gloria Winters, Gil Stratton	Drama	Monogram
House by the River	Fritz Lang	Louis Hayward, Jane Wyatt, Lee Bowman	Film noir	Republic

== I-J ==
Title	Director	Cast	Genre	Notes
I Killed Geronimo	John Hoffman	James Ellison, Virginia Herrick, Chief Thundercloud	Western	Eagle-Lion
I Shot Billy the Kid	William Berke	Don "Red" Barry, Robert Lowery, Judith Allen	Western	Lippert
I Was a Shoplifter	Charles Lamont	Mona Freeman, Scott Brady, Charles Drake	Film noir	Universal
I'll Get By	Richard Sale	June Haver, William Lundigan, Gloria DeHaven	Musical	20th Century Fox
In a Lonely Place	Nicholas Ray	Humphrey Bogart, Gloria Grahame, Jeff Donnell	Film noir	Columbia
Indian Territory	John English	Gene Autry, Gail Davis, Kirby Grant	Western	Columbia
The Iroquois Trail	Phil Karlson	George Montgomery, Brenda Marshall, Glenn Langan	Western	United Artists
It's a Small World	William Castle	Lorraine Miller, Will Geer, Steve Brodie	Drama	Eagle-Lion
The Jackie Robinson Story	Alfred E. Green	Jackie Robinson, Ruby Dee, Louise Beavers	Biography, Sports	Eagle-Lion.
The Jackpot	Walter Lang	James Stewart, Barbara Hale, Patricia Medina	Comedy	20th Century Fox
Jiggs and Maggie Out West	William Beaudine	Joe Yule, Renie Riano, Tim Ryan	Comedy	Monogram
Joe Palooka in Humphrey Takes a Chance	Jean Yarbrough	Leon Errol, Joe Kirkwood, Lois Collier	Comedy	Monogram
Joe Palooka in the Squared Circle	Reginald LeBorg	Joe Kirkwood, James Gleason, Lois Hall	Comedy	Monogram
Joe Palooka Meets Humphrey	Jean Yarbrough	Leon Errol, Joe Kirkwood, Elyse Knox	Comedy	Monogram
Johnny One-Eye	Robert Florey	Pat O'Brien, Wayne Morris, Dolores Moran	Film noir	United Artists

== K-L ==
Title	Director	Cast	Genre	Notes
The Kangaroo Kid	Lesley Selander	Martha Hyer, Veda Ann Borg, Jock Mahoney	Western	United Artists
Kansas Raiders	Ray Enright	Audie Murphy, Brian Donlevy, Marguerite Chapman	Western	Universal
Key to the City	George Sidney	Clark Gable, Loretta Young, Frank Morgan	Romantic comedy	MGM
The Kid from Texas	Kurt Neumann	Audie Murphy, Gale Storm, Albert Dekker	Western	Universal
Kill or Be Killed	Max Nosseck	Lawrence Tierney, George Coulouris, Rudolph Anders	Crime	Eagle-Lion
Kill the Umpire	Lloyd Bacon	William Bendix, William Frawley, Gloria Henry	Comedy	Columbia
Killer Shark	Budd Boetticher	Roddy McDowall, Laurette Luez, Roland Winters	Adventure	Monogram
The Killer That Stalked New York	Earl McEvoy	Evelyn Keyes, Charles Korvin, William Bishop	Film noir	Columbia. Based on Cosmo article
Kim	Victor Saville	Errol Flynn, Dean Stockwell, Paul Lukas	Adventure	MGM. Based on the novel
King of the Bullwhip	Ron Ormond	Lash LaRue, Jack Holt, Anne Gwynne	Western	Realart
King Solomon's Mines	Compton Bennett	Deborah Kerr, Stewart Granger, Richard Carlson	Adventure	MGM. Based on the 1885 novel
Kiss Tomorrow Goodbye	Gordon Douglas	James Cagney, Barbara Payton, Helena Carter	Drama	Warner Bros.
A Lady Without Passport	Joseph H. Lewis	Hedy Lamarr, John Hodiak, James Craig	Film noir	MGM
Last of the Buccaneers	Lew Landers	Paul Henreid, Karin Booth, Mary Anderson	Adventure	Columbia
Law of the Badlands	Lesley Selander	Tim Holt, Joan Dixon, Richard Martin	Western	RKO
Law of the Panhandle	Lewis D. Collins	Johnny Mack Brown, Jane Adams, Marshall Reed	Western	Monogram
The Lawless	Joseph Losey	Macdonald Carey, Gail Russell, Lee Patrick	Drama	Paramount
Let's Dance	Norman Z. McLeod	Betty Hutton, Fred Astaire, Roland Young	Musical comedy	Paramount
A Life of Her Own	George Cukor	Lana Turner, Ray Milland, Louis Calhern	Drama	MGM
Lightning Guns	Fred F. Sears	Charles Starrett, Gloria Henry, William Bailey	Western	Columbia
Lonely Heart Bandits	George Blair	Barbra Fuller, Dorothy Patrick, Robert Rockwell	Drama	Republic
The Lost Volcano	Ford Beebe	Johnny Sheffield, Elena Verdugo, Marjorie Lord	Adventure	Monogram
Louisa	Alexander Hall	Ronald Reagan, Spring Byington, Ruth Hussey	Comedy	Universal. Piper Laurie's film debut
Love Happy	David Miller	Marx Brothers, Vera-Ellen, Raymond Burr	Comedy	United Artists. Last Marx Brothers film
Love That Brute	Alexander Hall	Jean Peters, Paul Douglas, Cesar Romero	Comedy	20th Century Fox
Lucky Losers	William Beaudine	Leo Gorcey, Huntz Hall, Hillary Brooke	Comedy	Monogram

== M-N ==
Title	Director	Cast	Genre	Notes
Ma and Pa Kettle Go to Town	Charles Lamont	Marjorie Main, Percy Kilbride, Meg Randall	Comedy	Universal. 2nd of a series
The Magnificent Yankee	John Sturges	Louis Calhern, Ann Harding, Eduard Franz	Biographical	MGM
The Man Who Cheated Himself	Felix E. Feist	Lee J. Cobb, Jane Wyatt, John Dall	Film noir	20th Century Fox
Mark of the Gorilla	William Berke	Johnny Weissmuller, Trudy Marshall, Suzanne Dalbert	Adventure	Columbia
Marshal of Heldorado	Thomas Carr	James Ellison, Russell Hayden, Julie Adams	Western	Lippert
The Men	Fred Zinnemann	Marlon Brando, Teresa Wright, Everett Sloane	War	United Artists
Military Academy	D. Ross Lederman	Stanley Clements, James Millican, Gene Collins	Comedy, drama	Columbia
The Milkman	Charles Barton	Donald O'Connor, Jimmy Durante, Piper Laurie	Comedy	Universal
The Miniver Story	H. C. Potter	Greer Garson, Walter Pidgeon, Leo Genn	Drama	MGM. Sequel to Mrs. Miniver
The Missourians	George Blair	Monte Hale, Lyn Thomas, Roy Barcroft	Western	Republic
Mister 880	Edmund Goulding	Burt Lancaster, Dorothy McGuire, Edmund Gwenn	Comedy	20th Century Fox
A Modern Marriage	Paul Landres	Reed Hadley, Margaret Field, Robert Clarke	Drama	Monogram
Molly	Walter Hart	Philip Loeb, Gertrude Berg, Eduard Franz	Comedy	Paramount
Montana	Ray Enright	Errol Flynn, Alexis Smith, S.Z. Sakall	Western	Warner Bros.
Mother Didn't Tell Me	Claude Binyon	Dorothy McGuire, June Havoc, William Lundigan	Comedy	20th Century Fox
Motor Patrol	Sam Newfield	Don Castle, Jane Nigh, Reed Hadley	Crime	Lippert
Mr. Music	Richard Haydn	Bing Crosby, Nancy Olson, Ruth Hussey	Drama	Paramount
Mrs. O'Malley and Mr. Malone	Norman Taurog	Marjorie Main, James Whitmore, Ann Dvorak	Comedy	MGM
The Mudlark	Jean Negulesco	Irene Dunne, Alec Guinness, Beatrice Campbell	Comedy	20th Century Fox
Mule Train	John English	Gene Autry, Sheila Ryan, Robert Livingston	Western	Columbia
My Blue Heaven	Henry Koster	Betty Grable, Dan Dailey, Jane Wyatt	Comedy	20th Century Fox
My Friend Irma Goes West	Hal Walker	Diana Lynn, Marie Wilson, Dean Martin, Jerry Lewis	Comedy	Paramount. Sequel to My Friend Irma, 2nd Martin and Lewis film
Mystery Street	John Sturges	Ricardo Montalbán, Sally Forrest, Bruce Bennett	Film noir	MGM
Mystery Submarine	Douglas Sirk	Macdonald Carey, Märta Torén, Robert Douglas	War	Universal
Nancy Goes to Rio	Robert Z. Leonard	Ann Sothern, Jane Powell, Carmen Miranda	Musical	MGM; remake of It's a Date (1940)
The Nevadan	Gordon Douglas	Randolph Scott, Dorothy Malone, Forrest Tucker	Western	Columbia
Never a Dull Moment	George Marshall	Irene Dunne, Fred MacMurray, William Demarest	Comedy	RKO
The Next Voice You Hear...	William A. Wellman	James Whitmore, Nancy Davis, Lillian Bronson	Drama	MGM
Night and the City	Jules Dassin	Richard Widmark, Gene Tierney, Googie Withers	Film noir	20th Century Fox
No Man of Her Own	Mitchell Leisen	Barbara Stanwyck, John Lund, Phyllis Thaxter	Film noir	Paramount; remade in 1996 as Mrs. Winterbourne
North of the Great Divide	William Witney	Roy Rogers, Penny Edwards, Gordon Jones	Western	Republic
No Sad Songs for Me	Rudolph Maté	Margaret Sullavan, Wendell Corey, Viveca Lindfors	Drama	Columbia
No Way Out	Joseph L. Mankiewicz	Richard Widmark, Linda Darnell, Stephen McNally	Film noir	20th Century Fox; film debut of Sidney Poitier

== O-Q ==
Title	Director	Cast	Genre	Notes
The Old Frontier	Philip Ford	Monte Hale, Claudia Barrett, Paul Hurst	Western	Republic
On the Isle of Samoa	William Berke	Jon Hall, Susan Cabot, Raymond Greenleaf	Adventure	Columbia
Once a Thief	W. Lee Wilder	Cesar Romero, June Havoc, Marie McDonald	Film noir	United Artists
One Too Many	Erle C. Kenton	Ruth Warrick, Richard Travis, William Tracy	Drama	Independent
One Way Street	Hugo Fregonese	James Mason, Märta Torén, Dan Duryea	Film noir	Universal
Operation Haylift	William Berke	Bill Williams, Ann Rutherford, Jane Nigh	Drama	Lippert
Our Very Own	David Miller	Ann Blyth, Farley Granger, Jane Wyatt	Drama	RKO
Outcast of Black Mesa	Ray Nazarro	Charles Starrett, Martha Hyer, Stanley Andrews	Western	Columbia
Outlaw Gold	Wallace Fox	Johnny Mack Brown, Jane Adams, Milburn Morante	Western	Monogram
Outlaws of Texas	Thomas Carr	Whip Wilson, Andy Clyde, Phyllis Coates	Western	Monogram
Outrage	Ida Lupino	Mala Powers, Tod Andrews, Robert Clarke	Film noir	RKO
The Outriders	Roy Rowland	Joel McCrea, Arlene Dahl, Barry Sullivan	Western	MGM
Outside the Wall	Crane Wilbur	Richard Basehart, Marilyn Maxwell, Signe Hasso	Film noir	Universal
Over the Border	Wallace Fox	Johnny Mack Brown, Myron Healey, Pierre Watkin	Western	Monogram
Paid in Full	William Dieterle	Robert Cummings, Lizabeth Scott, Diana Lynn	Drama	Paramount
Pagan Love Song	Robert Alton	Esther Williams, Howard Keel, Rita Moreno	Musical	MGM
The Palomino	Ray Nazarro	Jerome Courtland, Beverly Tyler, Joseph Calleia	Western	Columbia
Panic in the Streets	Elia Kazan	Richard Widmark, Paul Douglas, Barbara Bel Geddes	Film noir	20th Century Fox. Shot in New Orleans
Peggy	Frederick de Cordova	Diana Lynn, Charles Coburn, Charlotte Greenwood	Comedy	Universal
Perfect Strangers	Bretaigne Windust	Ginger Rogers, Dennis Morgan, Thelma Ritter	Drama	Warner Bros.
The Petty Girl	Henry Levin	Robert Cummings, Joan Caulfield, Elsa Lanchester	Romantic comedy	Columbia
Please Believe Me	Norman Taurog	Deborah Kerr, Robert Walker, Mark Stevens, Peter Lawford	Romantic comedy	MGM
Prehistoric Women	Gregg G. Tallas	Laurette Luez, Allan Nixon, Joan Shawlee	Science Fiction	Eagle-Lion. Remade in 1967
Pretty Baby	Bretaigne Windust	Dennis Morgan, Betsy Drake, Zachary Scott	Comedy	Warner Bros.
Prisoners in Petticoats	Philip Ford	Robert Rockwell, Danny Sue Nolan, Anthony Caruso	Crime	Republic
Pygmy Island	William Berke	Johnny Weissmuller, Ann Savage, Steven Geray	Adventure	Columbia
Quicksand	Irving Pichel	Mickey Rooney, Jeanne Cagney, Peter Lorre	Film noir	United Artists

== R-S ==
Title	Director	Cast	Genre	Notes
Radar Secret Service	Sam Newfield	John Howard, Adele Jergens, Tom Neal	Action	Lippert
Raiders of Tomahawk Creek	Fred F. Sears	Charles Starrett, Smiley Burnette, Edgar Dearing	Western	Columbia
Redwood Forest Trail	Philip Ford	Rex Allen, Jeff Donnell, Jane Darwell	Western	Republic
The Reformer and the Redhead	Melvin Frank, Norman Panama	June Allyson, Dick Powell, Cecil Kellaway	Comedy	MGM
Return of the Frontiersman	Richard L. Bare	Gordon MacRae, Julie London, Rory Calhoun	Western	Warner Bros.
The Return of Jesse James	Arthur Hilton	John Ireland, Ann Dvorak, Henry Hull	Western	Lippert
Revenue Agent	Lew Landers	Lyle Talbot, Jean Willes, Onslow Stevens	Film noir	Columbia
Rider from Tucson	Lesley Selander	Tim Holt, Veda Ann Borg, Richard Martin	Western	RKO
Riding High	Frank Capra	Bing Crosby, Coleen Gray, Frances Gifford	Comedy	MGM. Remake of 1934's Broadway Bill.
Right Cross	John Sturges	June Allyson, Dick Powell, Ricardo Montalbán	Drama	MGM
Rio Grande	John Ford	John Wayne, Maureen O'Hara, Victor McLaglen	Western	Republic;
Rio Grande Patrol	Lesley Selander	Tim Holt, Jane Nigh, Cleo Moore	Western	RKO
Rocketship X-M	Kurt Neumann	Lloyd Bridges, Osa Massen, John Emery	Science fiction	Lippert
Rock Island Trail	Joseph Kane	Forrest Tucker, Adele Mara, Lorna Gray	Western	Republic
Rocky Mountain	William Keighley	Errol Flynn, Patrice Wymore, Scott Forbes	Western	Warner Bros.
Rogues of Sherwood Forest	Gordon Douglas	John Derek, Diana Lynn, George Macready	Adventure	Columbia
Rookie Fireman	Seymour Friedman	Bill Williams, Barton MacLane, Marjorie Reynolds	Drama	Columbia
Rustlers on Horseback	Fred C. Brannon	Allan Lane, Claudia Barrett, George Nader	Western	Republic
Saddle Tramp	Hugo Fregonese	Joel McCrea, Wanda Hendrix, John Russell	Western	Universal
Salt Lake Raiders	Fred C. Brannon	Allan Lane, Martha Hyer, Roy Barcroft	Western	Republic
Sarumba	Marion Gering	Michael Whalen, Doris Dowling, Tommy Wonder	Musical	Eagle-Lion
The Savage Horde	Joseph Kane	Wild Bill Elliott, Lorna Gray, Grant Withers	Western	Republic
Second Chance	William Beaudine	Ruth Warrick, Hugh Beaumont, John Hubbard	Drama	Independent
The Second Face	Jack Bernhard	Ella Raines, Rita Johnson, Bruce Bennett	Drama	Eagle-Lion
The Second Woman	James V. Kern	Robert Young, Betsy Drake, John Sutton	Film noir	United Artists
The Secret Fury	Mel Ferrer	Claudette Colbert, Robert Ryan, Paul Kelly	Film noir	RKO.
September Affair	William Dieterle	Joan Fontaine, Joseph Cotten, Françoise Rosay	Romance	Paramount
Shadow on the Wall	Pat Jackson	Ann Sothern, Zachary Scott, Gigi Perreau	Mystery	MGM.
Shakedown	Joseph Pevney	Howard Duff, Brian Donlevy, Peggy Dow	Film noir	Universal
Short Grass	Lesley Selander	Rod Cameron, Cathy Downs, Johnny Mack Brown	Western	Allied Artists
The Showdown	Dorrell McGowan	Wild Bill Elliott, Walter Brennan, Marie Windsor	Western	Republic
Side Street	Anthony Mann	Farley Granger, Cathy O'Donnell, James Craig	Film noir	MGM
Sideshow	Jean Yarbrough	Don McGuire, Tracey Roberts, John Abbott	Crime	Monogram
Sierra	Alfred E. Green	Audie Murphy, Wanda Hendrix, Dean Jagger	Western	Universal
Sierra Passage	Frank McDonald	Wayne Morris, Lola Albright, Lloyd Corrigan	Western	Monogram
The Silver Bandit	Elmer Clifton	Spade Cooley, Dick Elliott, Ginny Jackson	Western	Astor
Silver Raiders	Wallace Fox	Whip Wilson, Andy Clyde, Virginia Herrick	Western	Monogram
Singing Guns	R. G. Springsteen	Ella Raines, Vaughn Monroe, Walter Brennan	Western	Republic
Six Gun Mesa	Wallace Fox	Johnny Mack Brown, Gail Davis, Leonard Penn	Western	Monogram
The Skipper Surprised His Wife	Elliott Nugent	Robert Walker, Joan Leslie, Edward Arnold	Comedy	MGM
The Sleeping City	George Sherman	Richard Conte, Coleen Gray, Peggy Dow	Film noir	Universal
Snow Dog	Frank McDonald	Kirby Grant, Elena Verdugo, Rick Vallin	Adventure	Monogram
So Young, So Bad	Bernard Vorhaus	Paul Henreid, Catherine McLeod, Anne Francis	Drama	United Artists
The Sound of Fury	Cy Endfield	Frank Lovejoy, Kathleen Ryan, Richard Carlson	Film noir	United Artists.
South Sea Sinner	H. Bruce Humberstone	Shelley Winters, Macdonald Carey, Frank Lovejoy	Drama	Universal
Southside 1-1000	Boris Ingster	Don DeFore, Andrea King, George Tobias	Film noir	Allied Artists
Spy Hunt	George Sherman	Howard Duff, Märta Torén, Philip Friend	Film noir	Universal
Square Dance Katy	Jean Yarbrough	Barbara Jo Allen, Jimmie Davis, Virginia Welles	Musical	Monogram
Stage to Tucson	Ralph Murphy	Rod Cameron, Wayne Morris, Sally Eilers	Western	Columbia
Stars In My Crown	Jacques Tourneur	Joel McCrea, Ellen Drew, Juano Hernandez	Western	MGM.
State Penitentiary	Lew Landers	Warner Baxter, Onslow Stevens, Karin Booth	Drama	Columbia
Stella	Claude Binyon	Ann Sheridan, Victor Mature, David Wayne	Comedy	20th Century Fox
Storm over Wyoming	Lesley Selander	Tim Holt, Noreen Nash, Richard Martin	Western	RKO
Streets of Ghost Town	Ray Nazarro	Charles Starrett, Mary Ellen Kay, Stanley Andrews	Western	Columbia
Summer Stock	Charles Walters	Judy Garland, Gene Kelly, Gloria DeHaven	Musical	MGM
Sunset Boulevard	Billy Wilder	William Holden, Gloria Swanson, Erich von Stroheim	Film noir	Paramount
Sunset in the West	William Witney	Roy Rogers, Estelita Rodriguez, Penny Edwards	Western	Republic
The Sun Sets at Dawn	Paul Sloane	Walter Reed, Patrick Waltz, Howard St. John	Crime	Eagle-Lion
The Sundowners	George Templeton	Robert Preston, Robert Sterling, Cathy Downs	Western	Eagle-Lion
Surrender	Allan Dwan	Vera Ralston, John Carroll, Walter Brennan	Western	Republic
Swiss Tour	Leopold Lindtberg	Cornel Wilde, Josette Day, Simone Signoret	Drama	Film Classics

== T ==
Title	Director	Cast	Genre	Notes
Tarnished	Harry Keller	Dorothy Patrick, Jimmy Lydon, Barbra Fuller	Drama	Republic
Tarzan and the Slave Girl	Lee Sholem	Lex Barker, Vanessa Brown, Denise Darcel	Adventure	RKO
The Tattooed Stranger	Edward Montagne	Patricia Barry, John Miles, Walter Kinsella	Film noir	RKO
Tea for Two	David Butler	Doris Day, Gordon MacRae, Eve Arden	Musical comedy	Warner Bros.
The Texan Meets Calamity Jane	Ande Lamb	Evelyn Ankers, James Ellison, Jack Ingram	Western	Columbia
Texas Dynamo	Ray Nazarro	Charles Starrett, Lois Hall, Jock Mahoney	Western	Columbia
The Third Man	Carol Reed	Joseph Cotten, Alida Valli, Orson Welles	Film noir	Selznick
This Side of the Law	Richard L. Bare	Viveca Lindfors, Janis Paige, Robert Douglas	Film noir	Warner Bros.
Three Came Home	Jean Negulesco	Claudette Colbert, Patric Knowles, Florence Desmond	Drama	20th Century Fox
Three Little Words	Richard Thorpe	Fred Astaire, Red Skelton, Vera-Ellen	Musical	MGM.
Three Secrets	Robert Wise	Eleanor Parker, Patricia Neal, Ruth Roman	Drama	Warner Bros.
A Ticket to Tomahawk	Richard Sale	Dan Dailey, Anne Baxter, Rory Calhoun	Western musical	20th Century Fox
Timber Fury	Bernard B. Ray	David Bruce, Lee Phelps, Sam Flint	Western	Eagle-Lion
To Please a Lady	Clarence Brown	Clark Gable, Barbara Stanwyck, Adolphe Menjou	Drama	MGM
The Toast of New Orleans	Norman Taurog	Kathryn Grayson, Mario Lanza, David Niven	Musical	MGM
The Torch	Emilio Fernández	Paulette Goddard, Pedro Armendáriz, Gilbert Roland	Romantic	Eagle-Lion
The Tougher They Come	Ray Nazarro	Wayne Morris, Preston Foster, Gloria Henry	Drama	Columbia
Trail of Robin Hood	William Witney	Roy Rogers, Penny Edwards, Gordon Jones	Western	Republic
Trail of the Rustlers	Ray Nazarro	Charles Starrett, Gail Davis, Mira McKinney	Western	Columbia
Train to Tombstone	William Berke	Don "Red" Barry, Judith Allen, Robert Lowery	Western	Lippert
The Traveling Saleswoman	Charles Reisner	Joan Davis, Andy Devine, Adele Jergens	Western comedy	Columbia
Treasure Island	Byron Haskin	Bobby Driscoll, Robert Newton, Basil Sydney	Adventure	Disney
Trial Without Jury	Philip Ford	Robert Rockwell, Audrey Long, Kent Taylor	Mystery	Republic
Trigger, Jr.	William Witney	Roy Rogers, Dale Evans, Gordon Jones	Western	Republic
Triple Trouble	Jean Yarbrough	Leo Gorcey, Huntz Hall, Gabriel Dell	Comedy	Monogram
Tripoli	Will Price	Maureen O'Hara, John Payne, Phillip Reed	Adventure	Paramount
Twilight in the Sierras	William Witney	Roy Rogers, Dale Evans, Estelita Rodriguez	Western	Republic
Two Flags West	Robert Wise	Joseph Cotten, Linda Darnell, Cornel Wilde	Western	20th Century Fox
Two Weeks with Love	Roy Rowland	Jane Powell, Ricardo Montalbán, Louis Calhern	Musical	MGM.
Tyrant of the Sea	Lew Landers	Ron Randell, Rhys Williams, Lester Matthews	Historical	Columbia

== U–V ==
Title	Director	Cast	Genre	Notes
Under Mexicali Stars	George Blair	Rex Allen, Dorothy Patrick, Roy Barcroft	Western	Republic
Under My Skin	Jean Negulesco	John Garfield, Micheline Presle, Noel Drayton	Drama	20th Century Fox
Undercover Girl	Joseph Pevney	Alexis Smith, Scott Brady, Richard Egan	Film noir	Universal
The Underworld Story	Cy Endfield	Dan Duryea, Herbert Marshall, Gale Storm	Film noir	United Artists
Union Station	Rudolph Maté	William Holden, Barry Fitzgerald, Nancy Olson	Film noir	Paramount
Unmasked	George Blair	Robert Rockwell, Barbra Fuller, Raymond Burr	Crime	Republic
The Vanishing Westerner	Philip Ford	Monte Hale, Aline Towne, Roy Barcroft	Western	Republic
Vendetta	Mel Ferrer	Faith Domergue, George Dolenz, Joseph Calleia	Historical Crime	RKO
The Vicious Years	Robert Florey	Tommy Cook, Eduard Franz, Gar Moore	Crime	Film Classics
Vigilante Hideout	Fred C. Brannon	Allan Lane, Virginia Herrick, Eddy Waller	Western	Republic

== W–Z ==
Title	Director	Cast	Genre	Notes
Wabash Avenue	Henry Koster	Betty Grable, Victor Mature, Phil Harris	Musical	20th Century Fox
Wagon Master	John Ford	Ben Johnson, Harry Carey Jr., Joanne Dru	Western	RKO. Followed by TV series Wagon Train
Walk Softly, Stranger	Robert Stevenson	Joseph Cotten, Alida Valli, Spring Byington	Drama	RKO
Watch the Birdie	Jack Donohue	Red Skelton, Arlene Dahl, Ann Miller	Comedy	MGM
West of the Brazos	Thomas Carr	James Ellison, Russell Hayden, Julie Adams	Western	Lippert
West of Wyoming	Wallace Fox	Johnny Mack Brown, Gail Davis, Myron Healey	Western	Monogram
The West Point Story	Roy Del Ruth	James Cagney, Virginia Mayo, Doris Day	Musical	Warner Bros.
Western Pacific Agent	Sam Newfield	Kent Taylor, Sheila Ryan, Mickey Knox	Crime	Lippert
When Willie Comes Marching Home	John Ford	Dan Dailey, Corinne Calvet, William Demarest	Comedy	20th Century Fox. Golden Leopard award
When You're Smiling	Joseph Santley	Jerome Courtland, Frankie Laine, Lola Albright	Musical	Columbia
Where Danger Lives	John Farrow	Robert Mitchum, Faith Domergue, Claude Rains	Film noir	RKO. Domergue's film debut
Where the Sidewalk Ends	Otto Preminger	Dana Andrews, Gene Tierney, Gary Merrill	Film noir	20th Century Fox. Based on novel Night Cry
Whirlpool	Otto Preminger	Gene Tierney, Richard Conte, Jose Ferrer	Film noir	20th Century Fox
The White Tower	Ted Tetzlaff	Glenn Ford, Alida Valli, Claude Rains	Adventure	RKO. Based on novel of same name
The Wild Heart	Powell and Pressburger	Jennifer Jones, David Farrar, Cyril Cusack	Drama	American version of Gone to Earth
Winchester '73	Anthony Mann	James Stewart, Dan Duryea, Shelley Winters	Western	Universal
A Woman of Distinction	Edward Buzzell	Rosalind Russell, Ray Milland, Edmund Gwenn	Comedy	Columbia
Woman in Hiding	Michael Gordon	Ida Lupino, Stephen McNally, Howard Duff	Film noir	Universal
Woman on the Run	Norman Foster	Ann Sheridan, Dennis O'Keefe, Robert Keith	Film noir	Universal
Women from Headquarters	George Blair	Virginia Huston, Barbra Fuller	Drama	Republic
Wyoming Mail	Reginald LeBorg	Stephen McNally, Alexis Smith, Howard da Silva	Western	Universal
The Yellow Cab Man	Jack Donohue	Red Skelton, Gloria DeHaven, Edward Arnold	Comedy	MGM
Young Daniel Boone	Reginald LeBorg	David Bruce, Kristine Miller, Don Beddoe	Western	Monogram
Young Man with a Horn	Michael Curtiz	Lauren Bacall, Doris Day, Kirk Douglas	Drama	Warner Bros.

== Documentaries ==
Title	Director	Cast	Genre	Notes
The Crime of Korea			War	Korean War propaganda
The Hollywood Ten	John Berry		Documentary	
The Titan: Story of Michelangelo	Robert J. Flaherty	Fredric March	Documentary	Oscar winner
Why Korea?	Edmund Reek	Joe King (narrator)	Documentary	Oscar winner
With These Hands	Jack Arnold	Sam Levene	Documentary	

== Serials ==
Title	Director	Cast	Genre	Notes
Atom Man vs. Superman	Spencer Gordon Bennet	Kirk Alyn, Lyle Talbot, Noel Neill	Serial	Columbia
Cody of the Pony Express	Spencer Gordon Bennet	Jock O'Mahoney, Dickie Moore	Serial	
Desperadoes of the West	Fred C. Brannon	Richard Powers, Judy Clark	Serial	
Flying Disc Man from Mars	Fred C. Brannon	Walter Reed, Lois Collier	Adventure	Serial
The Invisible Monster	Fred C. Brannon	Richard Webb, Aline Towne	Adventure	Republic Serial
Pirates of the High Seas	Spencer Gordon Bennet, Thomas Carr	Buster Crabbe, Lois Hall	Serial	Universal

== Shorts ==
Title	Director	Cast	Genre	Notes
8 Ball Bunny	Chuck Jones	Looney Tunes	Animation	
Big House Bunny	Friz Freleng	Looney Tunes	Animation	
Boobs in the Woods	Robert McKimson	Looney Tunes	Animation	
The Brave Engineer	Jack Kinney	The King's Men	Animation	Disney; based on life of Casey Jones
Bushy Hare	Robert McKimson	Looney Tunes	Animation	
Canary Row	Friz Freleng	Looney Tunes	Animation	
Cue Ball Cat	Hanna-Barbera	Tom and Jerry	Animation	
A Date with Your Family	Edward G. Simmel	Ralph Hodges	Short	
Dopey Dicks	Edward Bernds	The Three Stooges	Comedy short	
The Ducksters	Charles M. Jones	Looney Tunes	Animation	
A Fractured Leghorn	Robert McKimson	Foghorn Leghorn	Animation	
The Framed Cat	Hanna-Barbera	Tom and Jerry	Animation	
Golden Yeggs	I. Freleng	Looney Tunes	Animation	
Grandad of Races	André de la Varre	Art Gilmore	Short	Oscar for Best Short (1 Reel)
Hillbilly Hare	Robert McKimson	Looney Tunes	Animation	
Homeless Hare	Chuck Jones	Looney Tunes	Animation	
Hugs and Mugs	Jules White	The Three Stooges	Comedy short	Columbia
Hurdy-Gurdy Hare	Robert McKimson	Looney Tunes	Animation	
In Beaver Valley	James Algar	Winston Hibler	Short	Oscar for Best Short (2 Reels)
Jerry and the Lion	Hanna-Barbera	Tom and Jerry	Animation	
Jerry's Cousin	Hanna-Barbera	Tom and Jerry	Animation	
Little Quacker	Hanna-Barbera	Tom and Jerry	Animation	
Love at First Bite	Jules White	The Three Stooges	Comedy short	
Motor Mania	Jack Kinney	Goofy	Animation	Disney
Mutiny on the Bunny	Friz Freleng	Looney Tunes	Animation	
Pop 'im Pop	Robert McKimson	Looney Tunes	Animation	
Punchy Cowpunchers	Edward Bernds	The Three Stooges	Comedy	
Puny Express	Walter Lantz, Dick Lundy	Woody the Woodpecker	Animation	
Rabbit of Seville	Charles M. Jones	Looney Tunes	Animation	
Rabbit's Moon	Kenneth Anger	Looney Tunes	Animation	
Safety Second	Hanna-Barbera	Tom and Jerry	Animation	
Saturday Evening Puss	Hanna-Barbera	Tom and Jerry	Animation	
The Scarlet Pumpernickel	Charles M. Jones	Looney Tunes	Animation	
Self-Made Maids	Jules White	The Three Stooges	Comedy	
Slaphappy Sleuths	Jules White	The Three Stooges	Comedy	
A Snitch in Time	Edward Bernds	The Three Stooges	Comedy	
The Stairs			Short	Oscar nominee
Strife with Father	Bob McKimson	Merrie Melodies	Animation	
Studio Stoops	Edward Bernds	The Three Stooges	Comedy	
Sugar Chile Robinson	Will Cowan	Billie Holiday, Frank Robinson	Short	
Texas Tom	Hanna-Barbera	Tom and Jerry	Animation	
Three Hams on Rye	Jules White	The Three Stooges	Comedy	
Tom and Jerry in the Hollywood Bowl	Hanna-Barbera	Tom and Jerry	Animation	
What's Up, Doc?	Robert McKimson	Looney Tunes	Animation	
The Wizard of Oz (TV special)	Burr Tillstrom		Short	Adaptation using puppets

== See also ==
- 1950 in the United States
