= Thunder Pass =

Thunder Pass may refer to:

== Cinema ==
- Thunder Pass (1954 film)

== Places ==
- Thunder Pass (Colorado), a mountain pass on the Continental Divide of the Americas in Rocky Mountain National Park, Colorado, United States.
