= Prisoners in Petticoats =

1950 film by Philip Ford

- Theatrical release poster
- Directed by: Philip Ford
- Screenplay by: Bradbury Foote
- Story by: Raymond L. Schrock; George Callahan
- Produced by: Lou Brock
- Starring: Valentine Perkins; Robert Rockwell; Danni Sue Nolan; Anthony Caruso; Tony Barrett; David Wolfe
- Cinematography: Ellis W. Carter
- Edited by: Harold Minter
- Music by: Stanley Wilson
- Production company: Republic Pictures
- Distributed by: Republic Pictures
- Release date: September 18, 1950
- Running time: 60 minutes
- Country: United States
- Language: English

Prisoners in Petticoats is a 1950 American crime film directed by Philip Ford, written by Bradbury Foote and starring Valentine Perkins, Robert Rockwell, Danni Sue Nolan, Anthony Caruso and Tony Barrett. The film was released on September 18, 1950 by Republic Pictures.

== Plot ==
Mark Hampton from the district attorney's office investigates a shooting outside the nightclub of gangster Nicky Bowman and questions Beverly Brent, the club's piano player. Beverly's real name is Joan Grey, but she uses a pseudonym to avoid damaging the reputation of her father, a college professor, by her association with criminals, including boyfriend Steve London.

Gun moll Francie White double-crosses boyfriend Sam Clarke, who is killed while Steve absconds with $100,000 of Sam's proceeds from an armored-car heist. When the bags are switched, Beverly is unaware that she now has the stolen money. When it is found at the professor's home, Steve is shot by police and Beverly is placed under arrest and sent to prison.

Francie is behind bars for another crime. She persuades Beverly to escape but then betrays her, informing Bowman. In the nick of time, Hampton comes to the rescue, having developed a romantic interest in Beverly.

== Cast ==
- Valentine Perkins as Joan Grey, alias Beverly Brent
- Robert Rockwell as Mark Hampton
- Danni Sue Nolan as Francie White
- Anthony Caruso as Nicky Bowman
- Tony Barrett as Steve London
- David Wolfe as Sam Clark
- Alex Gerry as Prof. Wesley Grey
- Michael Carr as Danny
- Queenie Smith as Beatrice
- Bert Conway as Pete Shock
- Marlo Dwyer as Candy Carson
- Russ Conway as Detective Blake
- Marta Mitrovich as Sadie
