= Dorothy Patrick =

Canadian-American actress (1921–1987)

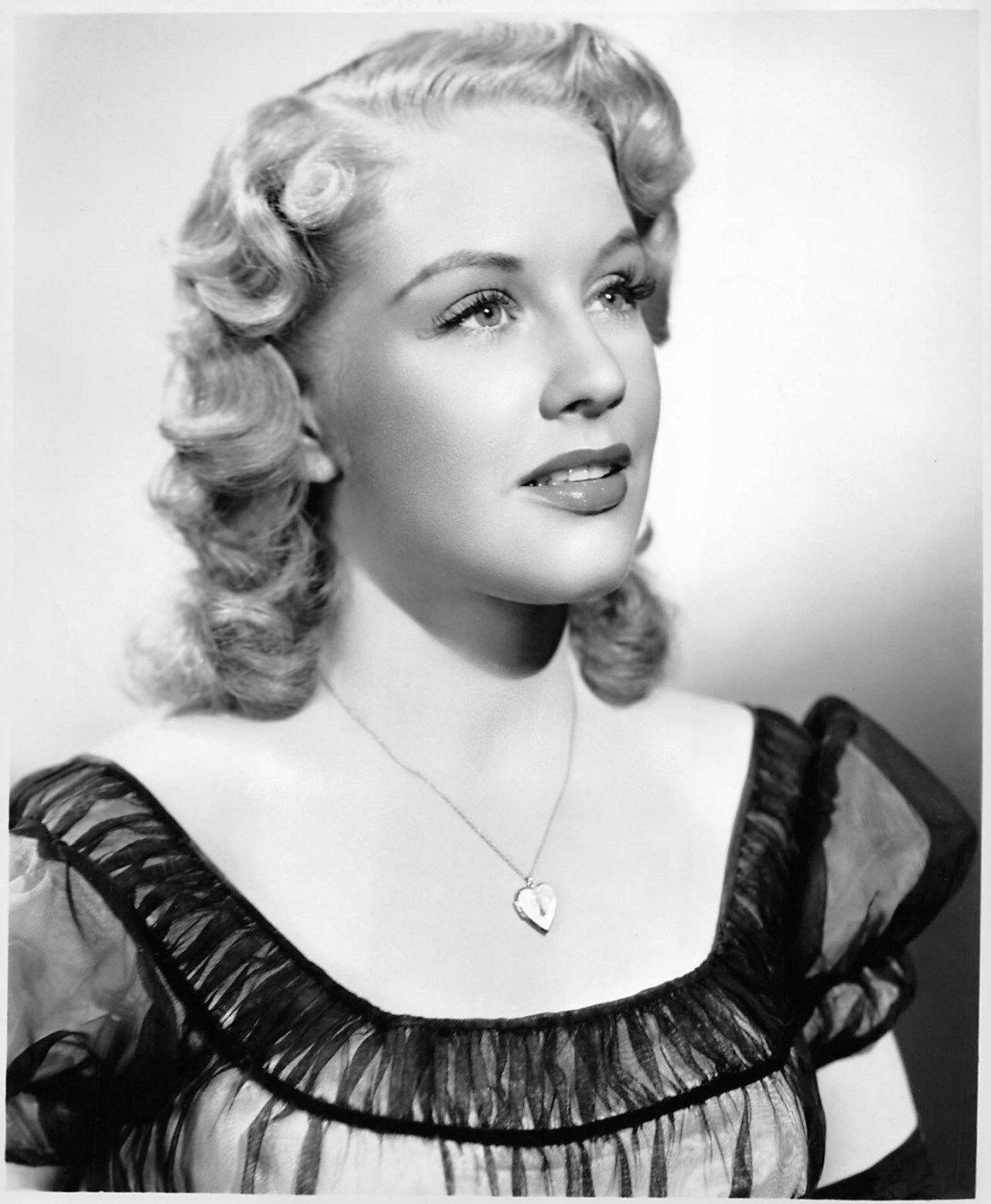
- Patrick in the 1940s
- Born: Dorothea Wilma Davis; June 3, 1921; Winnipeg, Manitoba, Canada
- Died: May 31, 1987 (aged 65); Los Angeles, California, U.S.
- Resting place: Westwood Memorial Park
- Occupation: Actress
- Years active: 1938–1967
- Spouses: Lynn Patrick (m. 1939; div. 1941) Dr. Sterling Bowen (m. 1943; div. 1948) J. Hugh Davis (m. 1955; div. 1963) Harold Hammerman (m. 1976)
- Children: 2

Dorothy Patrick (born Dorothea Davis; June 3, 1921 – May 31, 1987) was a Canadian-American film actress and a John Robert Powers model.

== Early life ==
Patrick was born on June 3, 1921, in Winnipeg, Manitoba, Canada, the daughter of Mr. and Mrs. Robert E. Davis. As a teen, Patrick was a professional photographic model for young ladies' fashions in Creed's, Hudson's Bay and Sears department store catalogues, popular in Canada.

After growing up in Winnipeg, in 1938 at age 17, she and her "backstage" mother, Eva, emigrated to the United States. Settling in New York City at tony Tudor City in Manhattan, Patrick became a fashion model with the John Robert Powers Agency. She was seen on the runways of the City's haute couture salons and in fashion and entertainment magazines of the day.

== Career ==
During her early career she was billed under her birth name, Dorothea Davis.

In 1939, Patrick won Samuel Goldwyn's Gateway to Hollywood talent-search contest. With a movie contract in hand, she moved to Hollywood with her mother and young son to live in Culver City, California and work at nearby MGM studios. Patrick trained at the studio's repertory workshop and first appeared as a Goldwyn Girl in Up in Arms starring Danny Kaye (1944). Her most noted MGM appearance was opposite Robert Walker in the Jerome Kern musical showcase Till the Clouds Roll By (1946).

As a "Queen of the Bs," she continued to appear in films produced in the 1940s and 1950s, including High Wall (1947) with Robert Taylor; New Orleans (1947) with Louis Armstrong and Billie Holiday; The Mighty McGurk (1947) with Wallace Beery; Follow Me Quietly (1949) with William Lundigan, and the Fritz Lang-directed noir classic, House by the River (1950). Apart from her film career, during the 1940s, she played several roles on Lux Radio Theatre.

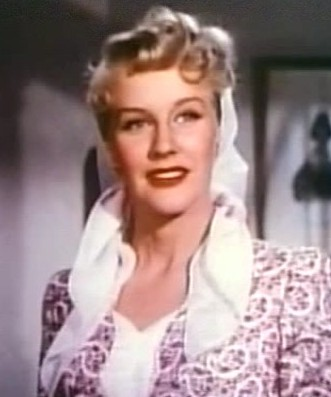
Dorothy Patrick in Till the Clouds Roll By (1946)

In the early days of television, she made guest appearances on the locally produced TV game show, Mike Stokey's Pantomime Quiz. The Korean War-era saw her at celebrity appearances for USO and she was Miss Naval Air Force Recruiting 1951. At Columbia Pictures, Patrick co-starred with Preston Foster and Wayne Morris in an oil wild-catting yarn, The Big Gusher (1951), and in a modern-day western, Outlaw Stallion (1954), opposite Billy Gray with Phil Carey.

Patrick co-starred or was supporting actress in a series of Republic programmers. The studio was best known releasing Saturday matinee serials, westerns, mysteries and crime dramas. Republic films she made include 711 Ocean Drive (1950) with Edmond O'Brien, Joanne Dru and Otto Kruger; the "true life" crime drama Lonely Heart Bandits (1950) with John Eldredge, a "Gringos go south-of-the-border" comedy, Belle of Old Mexico (1950); and the genre western Thunder Pass (1954) with Dane Clark, John Carradine and Andy Devine.

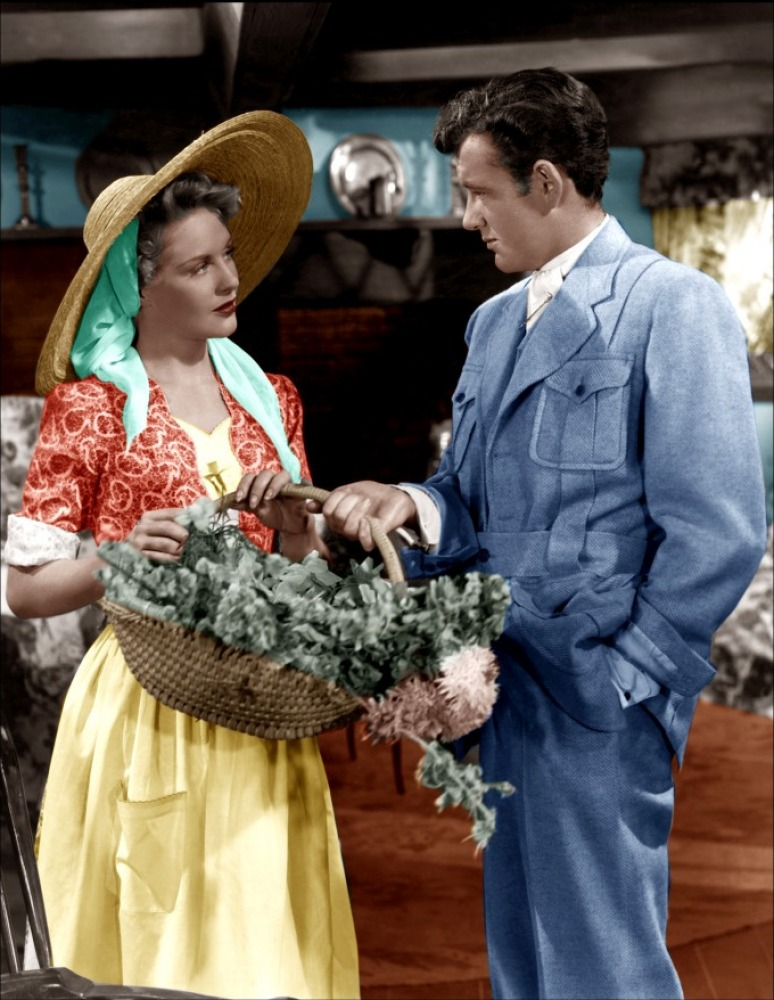
Dorothy Patrick and Robert Walker in Till the Clouds Roll By (1946)

For several summer seasons Patrick was also seen on stage at the La Jolla Playhouse. One summer she co-starred opposite Howard Duff in Anniversary Waltz; another season playing "Mrs. Miniver." Her last movies were in 1955 as Dorothy Davis Patrick at 20th Century Fox: Violent Saturday (1955) as the wife of Victor Mature and The View from Pompey's Head (1955) with Richard Egan and Dana Wynter.That same year, Patrick took a hiatus from Hollywood to raise her two adolescent sons back East in Short Hills, a New Jersey suburb of New York City.

Returning to Hollywood in 1961 and up for a few parts on television, she found her creative niche appearing with the Leontovich Theatre in West Hollywood for several seasons while a real estate agent in Beverly Hills. A working, lifelong Screen Actors Guild actress, Patrick appeared in more than 35 motion picture films and television productions.

== Personal life ==
In 1939, Patrick married professional hockey player Lynn Patrick in Manhattan. That marriage produced one son, Lester Lee Patrick (1940–1996). The couple divorced.

A few years into her film career she married noted Beverly Hills dentist-to-the-stars, Sterling Trevling "Doc" Bowen. Her son from this marriage was Sterling Terrence "Terry" Bowen (b. 1944).

== Death ==
On May 31, 1987, the 65 year-old Patrick died of heart attack. She was interred at the "columbarium-to-the-stars", Pierce Brothers Westwood in West Los Angeles, California.

== Filmography ==
Year	Title	Role	Notes
1944	Up in Arms	Goldwyn Girl	Uncredited
1946	Boys' Ranch	Susan Walker	
1946	Till the Clouds Roll By	Eva Kern	
1947	The Mighty McGurk	Caroline Glenson	
1947	New Orleans	Miralee Smith	
1947	High Wall	Helen Kenet	
1948	Alias a Gentleman	Elaine Carter	
1949	Follow Me Quietly	Ann Gorman	
1949	Come to the Stable	Kitty Blaine	
1950	The Blonde Bandit	Gloria Dell	
1950	Tarnished	Lou Jellison	
1950	Belle of Old Mexico	Deborah Chatfield	
1950	Federal Agent at Large	Solitare	
1950	House by the River	Emily Gaunt	
1950	Destination Big House	Janet Brooks	
1950	711 Ocean Drive	Trudy Maxwell	
1950	Lonely Heart Bandits	Louise Curtis	
1950	Under Mexicali Stars	Madeline Wellington	
1951	The Big Gusher	Betsy Abbott	
1951	I'll See You in My Dreams	Chorine	Uncredited
1952	Retreat, Hell!	Eve O'Grady	
1952	Singin' in the Rain	Usherette	Uncredited
1952	Road Agent	Sally Clayton	
1952	Scaramouche	Dorie	Uncredited
1952	The Sellout	Morrison's Secretary	Uncredited
1952	Desert Passage	Roxie Van Zell	
1952	Battle Zone	Danny's Girl	Uncredited
1952	The Bad and the Beautiful	Arlene	Uncredited
1953	Tangier Incident	Nadine	
1953	Savage Frontier	Elizabeth Webb	
1953	Half a Hero	Edna Radwell	
1953	Torch Song	Martha	
1953	Man of Conflict	Betty Coughlin	
1954	Men of the Fighting Lady	Mrs. Dodson	Uncredited
1954	The Outlaw Stallion	Mary Saunders	
1954	Thunder Pass	Murdock	
1955	Violent Saturday	Helen Martin	
1955	Las Vegas Shakedown	Dorothy Reid	
1955	The View from Pompey's Head	Meg Page	
1956	The Peacemaker	Edith Sawyer	
1966	The Singing Nun	Mrs. Messereaux	Uncredited, (final film role)
