= The Blonde Bandit =

1949 film by Harry Keller

- Theatrical release poster
- Directed by: Harry Keller
- Screenplay by: John K. Butler
- Produced by: Sidney Picker
- Starring: Gerald Mohr; Dorothy Patrick; Robert Rockwell; Charles Cane; Larry J. Blake; Argentina Brunetti
- Cinematography: Ellis W. Carter
- Edited by: Arthur Hilton
- Music by: Stanley Wilson
- Production company: Republic Pictures
- Distributed by: Republic Pictures
- Release date: December 22, 1949
- Running time: 60 minutes
- Country: United States
- Language: English

The Blonde Bandit is a 1949 American crime film directed by Harry Keller and written by John K. Butler. The film stars Gerald Mohr, Dorothy Patrick, Robert Rockwell, Charles Cane, Larry J. Blake and Argentina Brunetti. The film was released on December 22, 1949, by Republic Pictures.

== Plot ==
Gloria Dell arrives in a western town looking for a man she's been corresponding with who has sent her an engagement ring, but learns he's a bigamist. A jeweler overpays Gloria for the ring, then lies that she robbed his store. The money's found on Gloria and she is placed under arrest.

A mobster, Joe Sapelli, suspects that Gloria has been framed and posts her bail. Before she leaves, a district attorney, Deveron, asks her to go undercover and expose Joe's rackets, in exchange for all charges against her being dropped. Corrupt vice-squad cops Metzger and Roberts tip off Joe, but he and Gloria surprisingly fall in love.

Deveron nabs the crooked cops and chases Joe to an air strip, where his private plane is unable to take off. Joe says goodbye to Gloria, but she promises to wait and gives him the ring.

== Cast ==
- Gerald Mohr as Joe Sapelli
- Dorothy Patrick as Gloria Dell
- Robert Rockwell as Dist. Atty. James Deveron
- Charles Cane as Lt. Ralph Metzger
- Larry J. Blake as Capt. Ed Roberts
- Argentina Brunetti as Mama Sapelli
- Richard Irving as Benny
- Philip Van Zandt as Artie Jerome
- Alex Frazer as Charles Winters
- Ted Jacques as Bartender
