= Robert Rockwell =

American actor (1920–2003)

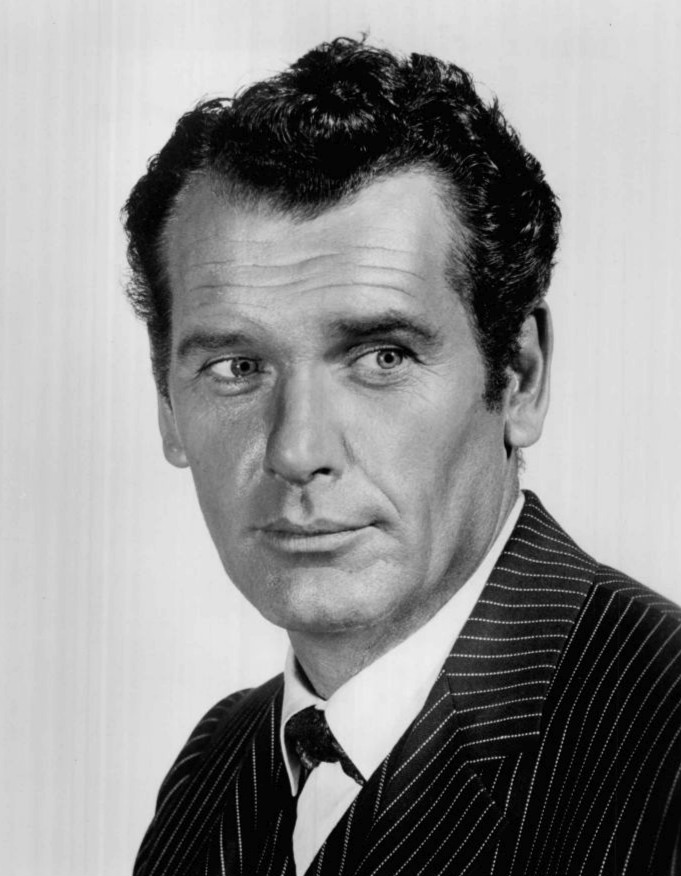
- Rockwell circa 1959
- Born: October 15, 1920; Lake Bluff, Illinois, U.S.
- Died: January 25, 2003 (aged 82); Malibu, California, U.S.
- Other name: Rocky Rockwell
- Education: Pasadena Playhouse College of Theatre Arts (MFA)
- Years active: 1948–1995
- Spouse: Elizabeth Anne Weiss (m. 1942–2003)
- Children: 5

Robert Rockwell (October 15, 1920 – January 25, 2003) was an American stage, film, radio and television actor. He is best known for playing the handsome, but awkward biology teacher Philip Boynton in the radio and television sitcom Our Miss Brooks opposite Eve Arden.

== Career ==
A native of Lake Bluff, Illinois Rockwell studied at the Pasadena Playhouse College of Theatre Arts, from which he obtained a master's degree. During World War II he enlisted in the US Navy for four years serving in Washington D.C.

After beginning his career as a contract player for Republic Studios he appeared, over his almost 50-year acting career, in more than 350 television episodes and, on stage, opposite José Ferrer in the 1946 Broadway production of Cyrano de Bergerac, and with Ginger Rogers during the 1960s in a San Diego production of Whitfield Cook's play A More Perfect Union. He appeared (uncredited) in the first Superman television show episode as Clark Kent's father, Jor-El in 1952. He appeared in The Millionaire in the 1958 episode "Millionaire Lee Randolph" as the title character. The following year, he performed as Mr. Philips in the Gunsmoke episode "Renegade White", and as Dick Benedict in the Perry Mason episode "The Case of the Deadly Toy" as the love interest of the defendant Claire Allison. He starred in the 1961 Perry Mason episode "The Case of the Misguided Missile" as an Air Force officer court-martialled on a murder charge. He later starred in the 1962 Perry Mason episodes "The Case of the Lurid Letter" as murderer Everett Rixby, a high school principal, and the murderer Cole B. Troy in "The Case of the Shapely Shadow". He also appeared as Ed Purvis in the 1965 episode Perry Mason episode "The Case of the Candy Queen".

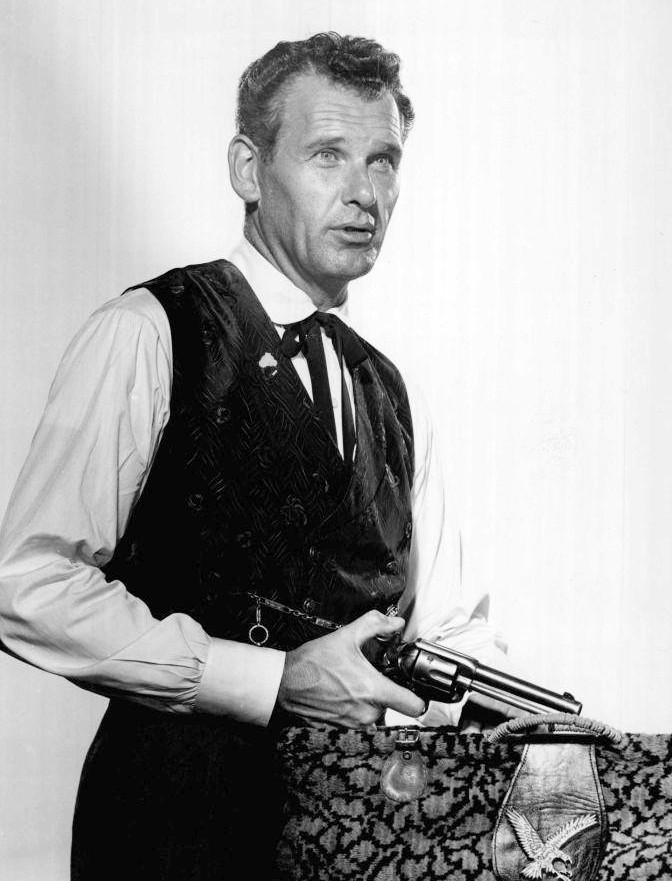
Rockwell as The Man from Blackhawk (1959)

Rockwell starred in his own ABC western-themed television series, The Man from Blackhawk in the 1959-1960 season. Rockwell was cast as the Blackhawk Insurance Company's key investigator, Sam Logan, who is assigned to weed out fraud in the payment of claims. He also played Sam Thompson in Thompson's Ghost, Tom Bennett in The Bill Cosby Show and Officer Russo in Adam-12.

In 1967, he played a littering tourist in the Lassie episode "Lassie's Litter Bit", an iconic episode which earned a trip for Lassie to the White House to shake hands with then First Lady "Ladybird" Johnson who had used the famous collie in her Keep America Beautiful Campaign.

Rockwell was a founding member of the California Artists Radio Theatre. He played standard leads in a couple of anti-Communist-era features, including Republic's The Red Menace (1949) in which he was cast as a returning veteran of World War II who is duped by communists.

Later in his career, he appeared on episodes of Petticoat Junction (1970, episode: "Spare That Cottage", as Norbert Thompson), Growing Pains (1988–1990) and Beverly Hills, 90210 (1993). In 1981, he appeared as Uncle Henry on the Benson episode "Marcy's Wedding". Oscar Babcock in a season 2 episode of Mama's Family: Mama buys a car.

His appearances in commercials and voiceovers totaled more than 200, most notably as the armchair grandfather treating his grandson to a piece of candy in the 1995 version of the Werthers Original candy spot.

== Death ==
On January 25, 2003, Rockwell died of cancer at his home in Malibu at the age of 82. He and his wife, Elizabeth Anne (née Weiss), to whom he had been married since 1942, had five children.

== Filmography ==
| Year | Title | Role | Notes |
|---|---|---|---|
| 1948 | You Gotta Stay Happy | Eddie | |
| 1949 | The Red Menace | Bill Jones | |
| 1949 | Task Force | Lt. Kelly | Uncredited |
| 1949 | Alias the Champ | Police Lt. Ron Peterson | |
| 1950 | The Blonde Bandit | Dist. Atty. James Deveron | |
| 1950 | Unmasked | Detective Lt. James 'Jim' Webster | |
| 1950 | Singing Guns | Townsman | Uncredited |
| 1950 | Belle of Old Mexico | Kip Armitage III | |
| 1950 | Federal Agent at Large | Dr. Ross Carrington | |
| 1950 | Women from Headquarters | Gates | |
| 1950 | Destination Big House | Dr. Walter Phillips | |
| 1950 | Trial Without Jury | Police Lt. Bill Peters | |
| 1950 | Lonely Heart Bandits | Police Lt. Carroll | |
| 1950 | Prisoners in Petticoats | Mark Hampton | |
| 1951 | Call Me Mister | 1st Sergeant | Uncredited |
| 1951 | The Frogmen | Lt. Bill Doyle | |
| 1951 | The Prince Who Was a Thief | Bogo | Uncredited |
| 1951 | Week-End with Father | Ranger Kennedy | Uncredited |
| 1952 | The Adventures of Superman | Jor El | Uncredited |
| 1952 | Just for You | John Ransome | |
| 1952 | The Turning Point | Reporter | Uncredited |
| 1952 | Ellis in Freedomland | Ellis Homan | |
| 1953 | The War of the Worlds | Forest Ranger at Crash Site | Uncredited |
| 1956 | Our Miss Brooks | Phil Boynton | |
| 1965 | A Letter to Nancy | Pastor | |
| 1968 | Sol Madrid | Chief Danvers | |
| 1995 | Perfect Alibi | Jonah Kringle | (final film role) |
