= Unmasked (1950 film) =

1950 film by George Blair

- Theatrical release poster
- Directed by: George Blair
- Written by: Manuel Seff; Paul Yawitz; Albert DeMond; Norman S. Hall
- Produced by: Stephen Auer
- Starring: Robert Rockwell; Barbra Fuller; Raymond Burr
- Cinematography: Bud Thackery
- Edited by: Robert M. Leeds
- Music by: Stanley Wilson
- Production company: Republic Pictures
- Distributed by: Republic Pictures
- Release date: January 30, 1950
- Running time: 60 minutes
- Country: United States
- Language: English

Unmasked is a 1950 American crime film directed by George Blair and starring Robert Rockwell, Barbra Fuller and Raymond Burr.

The film's sets were designed by the art director Frank Hotaling.

== Cast ==
- Robert Rockwell as Detective Lt. James 'Jim' Webster
- Barbra Fuller as Linda Jackson
- Raymond Burr as Roger Lewis
- Hillary Brooke as Doris King Jackson
- Paul Harvey as Harry Jackson
- Norman Budd as 'Biggie' Wolfe
- John Eldredge as Johnny Rocco
- Emory Parnell as 'Pop' Swenson
- Russell Hicks as George Richards, District Attorney
- Grace Albertson as Mona Durant, Lewis' Sweetheart
- Lester Sharpe as Mr. Schmidt, Pawnbroker
- Charles Quigley as Newcombe—Police Detective
- Barbara Pepper as Mrs. Schmidt
- Charles Trowbridge as Dr. Lowell
- Harry Harvey as Saunders

== Bibliography ==
- Spicer, Andrew. Historical Dictionary of Film Noir. Scarecrow Press, 2010.
