= The Outlaw Stallion =

1954 American western film

- Theatrical release poster
- Directed by: Fred F. Sears
- Screenplay by: David Lang
- Produced by: Wallace MacDonald
- Starring: Philip Carey; Dorothy Patrick; Billy Gray; Roy Roberts; Gordon Jones; Trevor Bardette; Morris Ankrum
- Cinematography: Lester White
- Edited by: Aaron Stell
- Music by: Mischa Bakaleinikoff
- Production company: Columbia Pictures
- Distributed by: Columbia Pictures
- Release date: July 3, 1954
- Running time: 64 minutes
- Country: United States
- Language: English

The Outlaw Stallion is a 1954 American Western film directed by Fred F. Sears and written by David Lang. The film stars Philip Carey, Dorothy Patrick, Billy Gray, Roy Roberts, Gordon Jones, Trevor Bardette and Morris Ankrum. The film was released on July 3, 1954, by Columbia Pictures.

== Plot ==
This western set in Utah features a wild stallion, a kid, his widowed mother, a veterinarian who'd like to marry the widow and a dyed-in-the-wool villain, posing as a surveyor but actually out to capture wild horses even though the pursuit and capture of wild horses had become an illegal practice in Utah.

== Cast ==
- Philip Carey as Doc Woodrow
- Dorothy Patrick as Mary Saunders
- Billy Gray as Danny Saunders
- Roy Roberts as Hagen
- Gordon Jones as Wagner
- Trevor Bardette as Rigo
- Morris Ankrum as Sheriff Fred Plummer
