= Follow Me Quietly =

1949 film by Richard Fleischer

- Theatrical release poster
- Directed by: Richard Fleischer
- Screenplay by: Lillie Hayward
- Story by: Anthony Mann; Francis Rosenwald
- Produced by: Herman Schlom
- Starring: William Lundigan; Dorothy Patrick; Jeff Corey; Charles D. Brown; Edwin Max
- Cinematography: Robert De Grasse
- Edited by: Elmo Williams
- Music by: Leonid Raab; Paul Sawtell
- Distributed by: RKO Radio Pictures
- Release dates: July 7, 1949 (New York City); July 14, 1949 (United States)
- Running time: 60 minutes
- Country: United States
- Language: English

Follow Me Quietly is a 1949 American semidocumentary police procedural film directed by Richard Fleischer. The film stars William Lundigan, Dorothy Patrick, and Jeff Corey.

== Plot ==
Ann Gorman, a persistent young female reporter, is investigating a murder spree committed by a mysterious strangler, known only as "The Judge". She meets with Lieutenant Harry Grant and Sergeant Art Collins at a bar. Both men leave the bar after receiving a phone call about the Judge's latest criminal act, and Gorman follows them. Grant and Collins arrive at the crime scene, where McGill, a newspaper editor, lies injured outside his workplace. A flashback occurs, in which "the Judge" violently attacked McGill at his office. During the struggle, McGill fell out of the window; after he finishes his story, he dies. At the crime scene, Grant and Collins discover the Judge's note with cut-out letters, stating he had "been ordained to destroy all evil."

The next morning, Grant tirelessly investigates the case, and rereads the Judge's notes he left to taunt the police. A coroner theorizes the killer is a Caucasian male with greying hair. After the killer's height, weight and appearance has been determined, Grant constructs a faceless dummy to help the investigation. Grant arrives at his apartment and finds Gorman inside. She continually asks Grant for inside scoops related to the investigation, much to his annoyance. Before heading to bed, Grant gives Gorman a paper with descriptive details of the Judge.

After a demonstration at police headquarters, pictures of the dummy are sent to major newspapers. Grant meets with Gorman at the bar and is angered when Gorman receives unauthorized access to the investigation by using his name. He returns to police headquarters where an older man claims he is the Judge. Grant does not believe him as the Judge strangles from behind, and not from the front. Later that night, Grant patrols the streets looking for the Judge (as he attacks on rainy nights). Gorman enters his car and apologizes for falsely using his name. He receives a police radio alert that a woman has been strangled inside her apartment.

When Grant arrives, he questions the victim's husband and begins to doubt he will ever solve the case. At the crime scene, police find a pulp magazine. Gorman believes the magazine was sold at second-hand bookstores with no back issues. They question several bookstores, and one bookstore manager identifies the man as a frequent customer, who is middle-aged and smokes cigarettes. Sometime later, Grant and Collins arrive at a diner, where the waitress identifies the suspect as Charlie Roy.

Both men arrive at Roy's apartment and find the exact magazine issues. They spy outside Roy's apartment, and when Roy arrives, a chase ensues. He is finally captured on the roof of a refinery. As Grant leads Roy into custody, Roy attacks him and falls to his death. Shortly after, Collins arrives at the bar and finds Grant and Gorman on a romantic date.

== Cast ==
- William Lundigan as Lt. Harry Grant
- Dorothy Patrick as Ann Gorman
- Jeff Corey as Sgt. Art Collins
- Nestor Paiva as Benny
- Charles D. Brown as Mulvaney
- Paul Guilfoyle as Overbeck
- Edwin Max as Charlie Roy/"The Judge"
- Frank Ferguson as McGill
- Marlo Dwyer as Waitress
- Michael Branden as Dixon
- Douglas Spencer as Phony "Judge"
- Maurice Cass as Bookseller
- Robert Emmett Keane as Coroner

== Reception ==
Bosley Crowther of The New York Times was dismissive of the film and wrote, "There is no intelligent reason why anyone should heed the proposal of Follow Me Quietly...[f]or this utterly senseless little thriller is patently nothing more than a convenient one-hour time-killer between performances of the eight-act vaudeville bill."

Reviewing it on DVD, Paul Mavis of DVD Talk rated it 4.5/5 stars and called it a "strange, unsettling film noir mystery, with a disturbing subtext".
