= The Lady's from Kentucky =

1939 film by Alexander Hall

- Film poster
- Directed by: Alexander Hall
- Written by: Malcolm Stuart Boylan (screenplay); Rowland Brown (story)
- Produced by: Jeff Lazarus
- Starring: George Raft; Ellen Drew; ZaSu Pitts
- Cinematography: Theodor Sparkuhl
- Edited by: Harvey Johnston
- Music by: John Leipold; Leo Shuken
- Distributed by: Paramount Pictures
- Release date: April 28, 1939
- Running time: 67 min.
- Country: United States
- Language: English

The Lady's from Kentucky is a 1939 film directed by Alexander Hall and starring George Raft and Ellen Drew. It was written by Malcolm Stuart Boylan from a story by Rowland Brown. The screenplay involves a failing bookie (Raft) who becomes half owner of a racehorse, with a Kentucky lady (Drew) owning the other half. ZaSu Pitts plays a supporting role.

== Plot ==
A gambler, Marty Black, wins a fifty percent interest in a thoroughbred owned by Penelope "Penny" Hollis, a prim and proper Kentucky horsewoman. Marty can't wait to wager on his new possession, Roman Son, but the health of the horse is foremost to Penny, who would rather nurture it than race it.

After he enters Roman Son in a race without her knowledge, Marty sees the horse's condition deteriorate. Penny permits him to run Roman Son in the Kentucky Derby and a romance develops after the horse's victory, particularly when Marty agrees to retire Roman Son rather than race any more.

== Cast ==
- George Raft as Marty Black
- Ellen Drew as Penny Hollis
- Hugh Herbert as Mousey Johnson
- ZaSu Pitts as Dulcey Lee
- Louise Beavers as Aunt Tina
- Lew Payton as Sixty
- Forrester Harvey as Nonny Watkins
- Edward Pawley as Spike Cronin
- Gilbert Emery as Pinckney Rodell
- Jimmy Bristow as Brewster
- Stanley Andrews as Doctor
- George Anderson as Joe Lane

== Production ==
The film was originally known as Racing Form. It always seems to have been a vehicle for Raft; Frances Dee was the first female star announced then Shirley Ross. Then Frances Lee was announced as star and Raoul Walsh director.

Raft was suspended by Paramount for refusing to make St Louis Blues He rejoined the studio on 5 October 1938. Walsh was replaced by Alexander Hall and Dee/Ross was replaced by Ellen Drew.

The film was shot partly on location at Oceanside near San Diego. A real foal was born during the making of the film.

The film was the last George Raft made under his contract with Paramount Pictures. Filming ended in January 1939 and Raft left the studio that money after he refused to make The Magnificent Fraud.

After filming the title was briefly changed to The Gambler and the Lady but it soon reverted to The Lady's from Kentucky.

== Reception ==
The New York Times said film "affirms the old Hollywood faith in good breeding, two-legged and four, by demonstrating once again that the New York gambler turned loose to graze in the Bluegrass inevitably comes a spiritual cropper and awakens a new and better man" conceding that "the picture moves briskly enough".

The Los Angeles Times called the film "enjoyable.".

== See also ==
- List of films about horse racing
