= Rock Island Trail (film) =

1950 film by Joseph Kane

- Theatrical release poster
- Directed by: Joseph Kane
- Screenplay by: James Edward Grant
- Produced by: Paul Malvern
- Starring: Forrest Tucker; Adele Mara; Lorna Gray; Bruce Cabot; Chill Wills; Barbra Fuller
- Cinematography: Jack A. Marta
- Edited by: Arthur Roberts
- Music by: R. Dale Butts
- Production company: Republic Pictures
- Distributed by: Republic Pictures
- Release dates: April 27, 1950 (Quad Cities); June 4, 1950 (New York)
- Running time: 90 minutes
- Country: United States
- Language: English

Rock Island Trail is a 1950 American Trucolor Western film directed by Joseph Kane, written by James Edward Grant and starring Forrest Tucker, Adele Mara, Adrian Booth and Bruce Cabot. The film was released by Republic Pictures and premiered on April 27, 1950.

== Plot ==
As the boss of the Rock Island Trail Company, a contractor of the American government that builds railroad tracks, Reed Loomis competes with stagecoach and riverboat companies, such as the one led by Kirby Morrow, who tries to sabotage his rivals.

After a sabotage attempt in which a riverboat is deliberately driven into the pile of a railroad bridge, severely damaging the bridge, the matter is brought to trial. Lawyer Abraham Lincoln successfully represents Loomis, and the riverboat company is ordered to rebuild the bridge.

Loomis is engaged to Constance Strong, the rich and beautiful daughter of banker David Strong. Although Constance wants to marry him as soon as possible, Loomis refuses to wed before becoming rich.

In another attempt to stop Loomis and his men, Morrow convinces the chief of an Indian tribe to attack a train with Loomis and his crew on board. The attack fails and Morrow is captured and killed.

The Rock Island Trail Company finally achieves its goals and Loomis marries Constance on a train.

== Cast ==
- Forrest Tucker as Reed Loomis
- Adele Mara as Constance Strong
- Adrian Booth as Aleeta
- Bruce Cabot as Kirby Morrow
- Chill Wills as Hogger McCoy
- Barbra Fuller as Annabelle Marsh
- Grant Withers as David Strong
- Jeff Corey as Abe Lincoln
- Roy Barcroft as Barnes
- Pierre Watkin as Major
- Valentine Perkins as Annette
- Jimmy Hunt as Stinky Tanner
- Olin Howland as Saloonkeeper
- Noble Johnson as Bent Creek
- John Holland as Maj. Porter
- Kate Drain Lawson as Mrs. McCoy
- Dick Elliott as Martin
- Emory Parnell as Sen. Wells
- Billy Wilkerson as Lakin

== Production ==
Following a search spanning 8,000 miles of the Chicago, Rock Island and Pacific Railroad's land, a filming location near Haileyville, Oklahoma was selected that featured unobstructed, natural terrain without indications of modern life, such as telephone poles. Location filming began on September 9, 1949. Actual railroad equipment dating back as far as 1831 was used in the film.

== Release ==
The film's world premiere became an event celebrated across the Quad Cities region on April 26 and 27, 1950, including parades, treasure hunts, talent contests and the visit by a contingent of Hollywood stars such as John Wayne, Roy Rogers and Dale Evans, in addition to the film's cast. The premiere showing was held at three theaters simultaneously in the cities of Moline and Rock Island in Illinois and Davenport, Iowa.

== Reception ==
In a contemporary review for The New York Times, critic Thomas M. Pryor called the film "a good, very old-fashioned Western" and wrote: "'Rock Island Trail' is a slambang outdoor adventure and, contradictory as it may sound, one of the funniest—quite unintentionally, of course—horse and iron horse operas that have come down the pike in a long, long while. Maybe we shouldn't have laughed so often, but the dialogue is full of priceless clichés and the acting is so flamboyant that it deserves some special attention in the next Academy awards sweepstakes."
