= Flame of Youth (1949 film) =

1949 film by R. G. Springsteen

- Theatrical release poster
- Directed by: R. G. Springsteen
- Screenplay by: Robert Libott; Frank Burt; Bradford Ropes
- Story by: Albert DeMond
- Produced by: Lou Brock
- Starring: Barbra Fuller; Ray McDonald; Danny Sue Nolan; Tony Barrett; Carol Brannon; Anita Carrell
- Cinematography: John MacBurnie
- Edited by: Robert M. Leeds
- Music by: Stanley Wilson
- Production company: Republic Pictures
- Distributed by: Republic Pictures
- Release date: September 22, 1949
- Running time: 60 minutes
- Country: United States
- Language: English

Flame of Youth is a 1949 American drama film directed by R. G. Springsteen and written by Robert Libott and Frank Burt. The film stars Barbra Fuller, Ray McDonald, Danny Sue Nolan, Tony Barrett, Carol Brannon and Anita Carrell. The film was released on September 22, 1949, by Republic Pictures.

== Plot ==
After his daughter, nicknamed Jerry, is arrested for stealing hubcaps off cars, naive George Briggs picks her up at jail. She immediately goes to gangster Cicero Coletti to get her cut of the stolen loot, quarreling with Coletti's sister, Lila.

Jerry pays her dad's tab when bookie Deke Edwards demands he pay up or else. She ignores sister Catherine's pleas to get out of petty crime and concentrate on becoming a fashion model instead. Instead, she tries to rob the cash from a junkyard, as does Lila, who is shot by the owner. Jerry escapes, ripping her pants on a wire fence.

Catherine repays the stolen loot to the junkyard's owner, but George inadvertently identifies the torn pants as hers when the police come to investigate. Catherine and Jerry are both placed under arrest. Deke shoots an innocent friend of Jerry, who finally sees the error of her ways as she is taken to jail.

== Cast ==
- Barbra Fuller as Lila Coletti
- Ray McDonald as Bill Crawford
- Danny Sue Nolan as Geraldine 'Jerry' Briggs
- Tony Barrett as Deke Edwards
- Carol Brannon as Catherine Briggs
- Anita Carrell as Barb Spranklin
- Michael Carr as Cicero Coletti
- Don Beddoe as George Briggs
- Denver Pyle as Lytz
- Willard Waterman as Steve Miller
- Arthur Walsh as Hector
- Sally Forrest as Miss O'Brien
- Audrey Farr as Waitress
- Maurice Doner as Loomis
- Stephen Chase as Charles Howard
- Charles Flynn as Jim Bennet
