= Cargo to Capetown =

1950 film by Earl McEvoy

- Directed by: Earl McEvoy
- Written by: Lionel Houser
- Produced by: Lionel Houser
- Starring: Broderick Crawford; Ellen Drew; John Ireland
- Cinematography: Charles Lawton Jr.
- Edited by: William A. Lyon
- Music by: George Duning
- Color process: Black and white
- Production company: Columbia Pictures
- Distributed by: Columbia Pictures
- Release date: April 1, 1950
- Running time: 79 minutes
- Country: United States
- Language: English

Cargo to Capetown is a 1950 American adventure drama film directed by Earl McEvoy and starring Broderick Crawford, Ellen Drew and John Ireland. It was produced and distributed by Columbia Pictures. The film reunited the stars of All the King's Men, a major commercial and critical hit from the previous year. The film's sets were designed by art director Cary Odell.

== Plot ==
The captain of a rusty tanker fights his chief engineer for a woman on board.

== Cast ==
- Broderick Crawford as Johnny Phelan
- Ellen Drew as Kitty Mellar
- John Ireland as Steve Conway
- Edgar Buchanan as Sam Bennett
- Ted de Corsia as Rhys
- Robert Espinoza as Rik
- Leonard Strong as Singh

== See also ==
- List of American films of 1950
