= Sierra Passage =

1950 film

- Theatrical release poster
- Directed by: Frank McDonald
- Screenplay by: Warren Douglas; Samuel Roeca; Tom W. Blackburn
- Produced by: Lindsley Parsons
- Starring: Wayne Morris; Lola Albright; Lloyd Corrigan; Alan Hale Jr. Roland Winters; Jim Bannon
- Cinematography: William A. Sickner
- Edited by: Ace Herman
- Music by: Edward J. Kay
- Production company: Monogram Pictures
- Distributed by: Monogram Pictures
- Release date: December 31, 1950
- Running time: 81 minutes
- Country: United States
- Language: English

Sierra Passage is a 1950 American Western film directed by Frank McDonald and written by Warren Douglas, Samuel Roeca, and Tom W. Blackburn. The film stars Wayne Morris, Lola Albright, Lloyd Corrigan, Alan Hale Jr., Roland Winters and Jim Bannon. The film was released on December 31, 1950, by Monogram Pictures.

== Plot ==
After professional hitmen Yance Carter, Andy, and Bart murder his father, 13-year-old Johnny Yorke is taken in by Thad Kring, the proprietor of a traveling minstrel show that features top sharpshooter Sam Cooper. Over the next decade, Johnny trains under Cooper and becomes an expert marksman himself. Throughout this time, he relentlessly searches for his father's killer, whom he can only identify by a distinctive high-pitched laugh and a missing finger.

Hoping to temper Johnny's obsessive quest for revenge, Thad hires a young woman named Ann Walker to serve as Johnny's act assistant, though Johnny remains too single-minded for romance or marriage. When Yance and his accomplices rob a train carrying the minstrel troupe, Johnny ignores the pleas of Thad and Ann to pursue the outlaws. After months of fruitless tracking, Johnny returns to performing when the show stops in Silver Springs. During a live performance, he finally recognizes Yance's distinct laugh in the audience.

== Cast ==
- Wayne Morris as Johnny Yorke
- Lola Albright as Ann Walker
- Lloyd Corrigan as Thaddeus Kring
- Alan Hale Jr. as Yance Carter
- Roland Winters as Sam Cooper
- Jim Bannon as Jud Yorke
- Billy Gray as Young Johnny Yorke
- Paul McGuire as Andy
- Richard Karlan as Bart
