= Federal Agent at Large =

1950 film by George Blair

- Theatrical release poster
- Directed by: George Blair
- Screenplay by: Albert DeMond
- Produced by: Stephen Auer
- Starring: Dorothy Patrick; Robert Rockwell; Kent Taylor; Estelita Rodriguez; Thurston Hall; Frank Puglia
- Cinematography: John MacBurnie
- Edited by: Arthur Roberts
- Music by: Stanley Wilson
- Production company: Republic Pictures
- Distributed by: Republic Pictures
- Release date: March 12, 1950
- Running time: 60 minutes
- Country: United States
- Language: English

Federal Agent at Large is a 1950 American crime film directed by George Blair, written by Albert DeMond and starring Dorothy Patrick, Robert Rockwell, Kent Taylor, Estelita Rodriguez, Thurston Hall and Frank Puglia. The film was released on March 12, 1950 by Republic Pictures.

== Plot ==
A U.S. Treasury agent goes undercover to break up a nationwide counterfeiting operation. After his partner is murdered while working the case, the agent follows a trail of clues across state lines, posing as a criminal to gain the gang’s trust. As the investigation tightens, he uncovers the inner workings of the counterfeit ring and risks his life to bring its leaders to justice.

== Cast ==
- Dorothy Patrick as Solitare
- Robert Rockwell as Dr. Ross Carrington
- Kent Taylor as Mark Reed, aka Nick Ravel
- Estelita Rodriguez as Lopita
- Thurston Hall as 'Big Bill' Dixon
- Frank Puglia as Angelo 'Angel' Badillo
- Roy Barcroft as Nels Berger
- Denver Pyle as 'Jumpy' Jordan
- Jonathan Hale as James Goodwin
- Robert Kent as Harry Monahan
- Kenneth MacDonald as Captain
- Sonia Darrin as Mildred
- Frank McFarland as Duke Warren
- John McGuire as customs officer
