= Billy Gray (actor) =

American actor (born 1938)

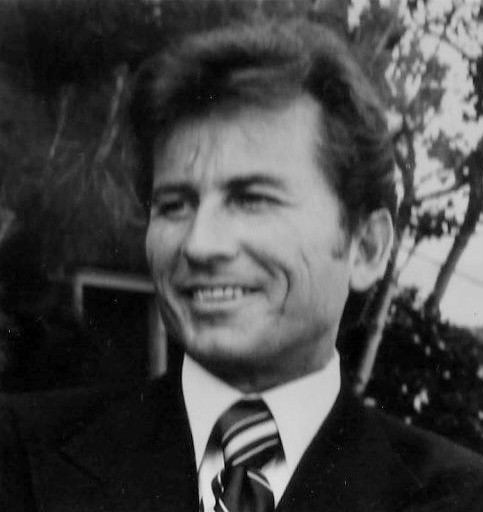
- Gray in 1977
- Born: William Thomas Gray; January 13, 1938 (age 88); Los Angeles, California, U.S.
- Occupations: Actor, businessman
- Years active: 1943–1980
- Spouses: Helena Kallianiotes (m. 1967; div. 1969) Donna Wilkes (m. 1977; div. 1981)

William Thomas Gray (born January 13, 1938) is an American actor, competitive motorcycle racer and inventor, known for his role as Bud Anderson on the television series Father Knows Best (1954–1960).

== Career ==
Gray began acting at five years old. He appeared with his mother in the 1949 horror comedy Abbott and Costello Meet the Killer, Boris Karloff (in separated scenes). He acted in more than 200 movies. He acted with stars such as Humphrey Bogart, Doris Day, Bob Hope, William Holden, Michael Rennie, Judith Anderson, Pat O'Brien and Barbara Stanwyck. He did not attend school and was educated by teachers hired by the film studios, often having class in tents set up on studio lots. He portrayed a young Jim Thorpe in Jim Thorpe – All-American, and starred in the science fiction film The Day the Earth Stood Still, of which he is the last surviving cast member. He also portrayed Tagg "Bull's Eye" Oakley, younger brother of Annie Oakley in the pilot episode of Annie Oakley.

From 1954 to 1960, Gray starred as son Bud Anderson in the television series Father Knows Best, for which he was nominated for the Primetime Emmy Award for Outstanding Supporting Actor in a Comedy Series. He was cast as Plato in Rebel Without a Cause, but had to exit the role when a delay in shooting interfered with his commitment to Father Knows Best. He was arrested for marijuana possession in 1962 and served 45 days in jail. However, he did reprise his role of Bud Anderson in two Father Knows Best reunion films in 1977. He was Alan in an Adventures of Superman episode, "Shot In The Dark", in 1953.

From 1970 to 1995, Gray was a Class A motorcycle speedway racer and race promoter. He then turned to inventing and entrepreneurship, having invented the F-1 guitar pick. He is also a motorcycle collector and businessman.

== Personal life ==
Gray was born in Los Angeles, to William H. Gray (1899–1963) and Beatrice A. Gray (née-Kimbrough; 1911–2009). He lost his father when he was 25.

Gray was married to and divorced from Helena Kallianiotes (1967–1969) and Donna Wilkes (1977–1981). As of July 2020, Gray lives in Topanga, California, in the same house he bought in 1957 while working on Father Knows Best.

== Filmography ==
=== Film ===
Year	Title	Role	Notes
1943	Man of Courage	Mike Wilson	
1946	Suspense	Little Boy at Zoo	Uncredited
1948	Fighting Father Dunne	Chip	
1949	Bad Men of Tombstone	Willie Stover	
1949	Abbott and Costello Meet the Killer, Boris Karloff	Boy with Bow and Arrow	
1950	Father Is a Bachelor	Feb Chalotte	Hurricane at Pilgrim Hill, 1950
1950	Singing Guns	Albert	
1950	In a Lonely Place	Boy seeking autograph	Uncredited
1950	Mister 880	Mickey	Uncredited
1950	Sierra Passage	Young Johnny York	
1951	Jim Thorpe – All-American	Young Jim Thorpe	
1951	On Moonlight Bay	Wesley Winfield	
1951	The Day the Earth Stood Still	Bobby Benson	
1952	Talk About a Stranger	Robert 'Bud' Fontaine Jr.	
1953	All I Desire	Ted Murdoch	
1953	By the Light of the Silvery Moon	Wesley Winfield	
1953	The Girl Next Door	Joe	
1954	The Outlaw Stallion	Danny Saunders	
1955	The Seven Little Foys	Bryan Lincoln Foy	
1961	The Explosive Generation	Bobby Herman Jr.	
1966	The Navy vs. the Night Monsters	CPO Fred Twining	
1971	Dusty and Sweets McGee	City Life	
1971	Werewolves on Wheels	Pill	
1979	Love and Bullets	Officer Durant	
1980	Porklips Now	Dullard	

=== Television ===
Year	Title	Role	Notes
1950	The Gene Autry Show (TV series)	Jimmy Foster	Season 1 Episode 5: "The Star Toter"
1950	The Gene Autry Show (TV series)	Eddie Baker	Season 1 Episode 17: "Twisted Trails"
1953	Adventures of Superman	Young Alan Harper	Season 2 Episode 5: "Shot in the Dark"
1954–1960	Father Knows Best	James "Bud" Anderson Jr.	200 episodes
1957	The Thin Man	Mike Edwards	Episode: "Come Back Darling Asta"
1960	Stagecoach West	'Frankie Niles'	Season 1 Episode 3: "Dark Return"
1960	Peter Gunn	'Eric Thorwald'	Season 2 Episode 34: "The Semi-Private Eye"
1960	Bachelor Father	David Ross	Season 4 Episode 15: "Ginger's Big Romance"
1961	Alfred Hitchcock Presents	Perry Hatch	Season 7 Episode 1: “The Hat Box”
1961	The Deputy	Johnny Blatner	Season 2 Episode 24: "Two-Way Deal"
1964	The Greatest Show on Earth	Nick	Season 1 Episode 16: "Corsicans Don't Cry"
1964	Arrest and Trial	Colin Martin	Season 1 Episode 26: "Tigers Are for Jungles"
1965	Rawhide	Lindsay McCullers	Season 7 Episode 17: "Moment in the Sun"
1966	Combat!	Candell	Season 5 Episode 2: "The Losers"
1967	Custer	Billy Nixon	Season 1 Episode 9: "Desperate Mission"
1969	Medical Center	Student at Party	Season 1 Episode: "Operation Heartbeat" (uncredited)
1970	The Bold Ones: The Protectors	Morgan Vontz	Season 1 Episode 6: "Memo from the Class of '76"
1977	The Father Knows Best Reunion	James "Bud" Anderson Jr.	Television film
1977	Father Knows Best: Home for Christmas	James "Bud" Anderson Jr.	Television film

== Bibliography ==
- Goldrup, Tom and Jim (2002). Growing Up on the Set: Interviews with 39 Former Child Actors of Film and Television. McFarland & Co. pp. 94–102. ISBN 1476613702.
- Holmstrom, John (1996). The Moving Picture Boy: An International Encyclopaedia from 1895 to 1995. Norwich: Michael Russell, pp. 206–207.
