= Danni Sue Nolan =

American actress (1923–2002)

Danny Sue Nolan
- Danni Sue Nolan in The Fugitive 1967
- Born: Dorothea Alyce Nolan; February 28, 1923; Denver, Colorado, U.S.
- Died: August 3, 2002 (aged 79); Palm Springs, California, U.S.
- Other names: Dani Sue Nolan; Dani Nolan; Dani Sue Hilton; Danni Sue Nolan; Danni Nolan
- Years active: 1949–1988
- Spouses: William Asher (m. 1951; div. 1961) Albert Talley (m. 1994)
- Children: 2

Dorothea Alyce Nolan (February 28, 1923 – August 3, 2002), better known as Danny Sue Nolan, was an American film actress. She made approximately 35 film and television appearances between 1949 and 1988 and had a starring role in a 1949 film, Flame of Youth. She was sometimes credited as Danni Sue Nolan, Dani Nolan, or Dani Sue Hilton.

== Career ==
Nolan is familiar to modern viewers for her role as the accidentally disrobed neighbor Gertie Duggan in the Three Stooges film Gents in a Jam. She also had many bit parts in several television shows such as I Love Lucy, The Brady Bunch, The Fugitive and The Donna Reed Show. She played Miss Bachrach, a receptionist at the Daily Planet in an episode of Adventures with Superman.

== Personal life and death ==
Nolan was married to television director/producer William Asher from 1951 to 1961. They had two children.

Nolan married James Albert Talley on August 8, 1994. She and Talley lived in Palm Springs, California, until her death from a stroke on August 3, 2002, at age 79.

== Filmography ==
Year	Title	Role	Notes
1949	Bandit King of Texas	Emily Baldwin	
1949	Flame of Youth	Geraldine "Jerry" Briggs	
1950	Prisoners in Petticoats	Francie White	
1950	Breakthrough	Lt. Janis King	
1952	Smoky Canyon	Roberta "Rob" Woodstock	
1952	The Sniper	Sandy	Uncredited
1952	Rainbow 'Round My Shoulder	Brady's Secretary	Uncredited
