= Ellen Drew =

American actress (1914–2003)

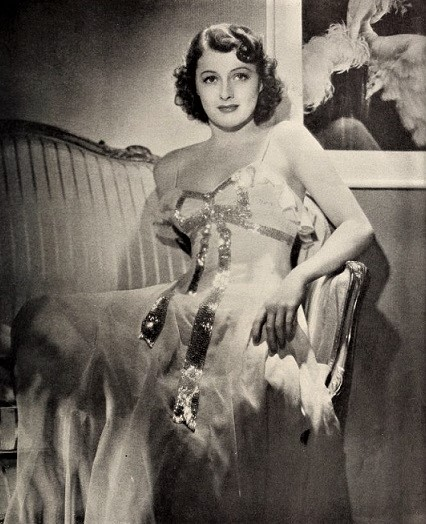
- Drew in 1938
- Born: Esther Loretta Ray; November 23, 1914; Kansas City, Missouri, U.S.
- Died: December 3, 2003 (aged 89); Palm Desert, California, U.S.
- Occupation: Actress
- Years active: 1936–1961
- Known for: Christmas in July; Isle of the Dead
- Spouses: Fred Wallace (m. 1935; div. 1940) Sy Bartlett (m. 1941; div. 1949) William T. Walker (m. 1951; div. 1967) James Edward Herbert (m. 1971)
- Children: 2

Ellen Drew (born Esther Loretta Ray; November 23, 1914 – December 3, 2003) was an American film actress.

== Early life ==
Drew, born in Kansas City, Missouri in 1914, was the daughter of an Irish-born barber. She had a younger brother, Arden. Her parents separated in 1931. She worked in multiple jobs and won a number of beauty contests before becoming an actress. Moving to Hollywood in an attempt to become a star, she was discovered while working at an ice cream parlor where one of the customers, actor William Demarest, took notice of her and eventually helped her get into films.

== Career ==
Ray's venture into the movies brought about a conflict in names when she tried starting her career with the name Terry Ray, which happened to be the name of another, male, actor. A 1937 newspaper photo showed the resolution of the conflict as "They conferred, drew lots from the hat, and masculine Terry Ray became Terry Rains, while feminine Terry Ray remained as before." She later tried the name of Erin Drew.

After appearing in 25 features using her birth name, she became a fixture at Paramount Pictures officially as Ellen Drew from 1938 to 1944, where she appeared in as many as six films per year, including Sing You Sinners (1938) with Bing Crosby and The Lady's from Kentucky (1939) with George Raft. She moved to RKO in 1944. Among her leading men were Ronald Colman, William Holden, Basil Rathbone, Dick Powell, and Robert Preston (in The Night of January 16th and Night Plane from Chungking).

Her other films include Christmas in July (1940), Isle of the Dead (1945), Johnny O'Clock (1947), The Man from Colorado (1948), The Crooked Way (1949), and The Baron of Arizona with Vincent Price (1950). In the 1950s, with her movie career on the decline, she worked as a television actress. Among her final roles was the part of Julia Webberly in the 1960 Perry Mason episode, "The Case of the Larcenous Lady".

=== Radio ===
On June 23, 1943, Drew co-starred with Agnes Moorehead and Ted Reid in "Uncle Henry's Rosebush" on Suspense, and on July 25, 1943, she co-starred with Preston Foster in "China Bridge", a presentation of Silver Theater on CBS radio. She also appeared twice on the Kate Smith Hour.

== Death ==
Drew died on December 3, 2003, in Palm Desert, California, of a liver ailment, aged 89. She was cremated and her ashes scattered at sea.

== Honors ==
For her contributions to the motion picture industry, Drew was honored with a star on the Hollywood Walk of Fame in 1960, located at 6901 Hollywood Blvd.

== In popular culture ==
A highly fictionalized version of her appears in James Ellroy's novels Perfidia (2014) and This Storm (2019).

== Partial filmography ==
- The Return of Sophie Lang (1936) as Secretary (uncredited)
- Rhythm on the Range (1936) as Party Guest (uncredited)
- Yours for the Asking (1936) (uncredited)
- My American Wife (1936) as Party Guest (uncredited)
- Hollywood Boulevard (1936) as Terry Ray - Casting Office Secretary (uncredited)
- Lady Be Careful (1936) as Girl in Sailboat
- Wives Never Know (1936) (uncredited)
- Murder with Pictures (1936) as Minor Role (uncredited)
- The Big Broadcast of 1937 (1936) as Telephone Girl
- Rose Bowl (1936) as Mary Arnold (uncredited)
- The Accusing Finger (1936) as Wife
- College Holiday (1936) as Dancer on Train (uncredited)
- Murder Goes to College (1937) as Lil
- The Crime Nobody Saw (1937) as Secretary (uncredited)
- Internes Can't Take Money (1937) as Nurse (uncredited)
- Make Way for Tomorrow (1937) as Usherette (uncredited)
- Turn Off the Moon (1937) as Minor Role (uncredited)
- Night of Mystery (1937) as Secretary
- Hotel Haywire (1937) as Switchboard Operator (uncredited)
- Mountain Music (1937) as Helen (uncredited)
- This Way Please (1937) as Chorus Girl (uncredited)
- The Buccaneer (1938) (uncredited)
- Scandal Street (1938) (uncredited)
- Dangerous to Know (1938) as Secretary
- Cocoanut Grove (1938) as Radio Station Receptionist (uncredited)
- You and Me (1938) as Cashier
- Sing, You Sinners (1938) as Martha Randall
- If I Were King (1938) as Huguette
- The Lady's from Kentucky (1939) as Penelope 'Penny' Hollis
- The Gracie Allen Murder Case (1939) as Ann Wilson
- The Escape (1939) as Reporter (uncredited)
- Geronimo (1939) as Alice Hamilton
- French Without Tears (1940) as Diana Lake
- Women Without Names (1940) as Joyce King
- Buck Benny Rides Again (1940) as Joan Cameron
- Christmas in July (1940) as Betty Casey
- Texas Rangers Ride Again (1940) as Ellen 'Slats' Dangerfield
- The Mad Doctor (1941) as Linda Boothe
- The Monster and the Girl (1941) as Susan Webster
- Reaching for the Sun (1941) as Rita
- The Parson of Panamint (1941) as Mary Malloy
- Our Wife (1941) as Babe Marvin
- The Night of January 16th (1941) as Kit Lane
- The Remarkable Andrew (1942) as Peggy Tobin
- My Favorite Spy (1942) as Teresa 'Terry' Kyser
- Star Spangled Rhythm (1942) as herself (uncredited)
- Ice-Capades Revue (1942) as Ann Porter
- Night Plane from Chungking (1943) as Ann Richards
- The Impostor (1944) as Yvonne
- And the Angels Sing (1944) (uncredited)
- That's My Baby! (1944) as Betty Moody
- Dark Mountain (1944) as Kay Downey
- China Sky (1945) as Louise Thompson
- Isle of the Dead (1945) as Thea
- Man Alive (1945) as Connie McBride
- Sing While You Dance (1946) as Susan Kent
- Crime Doctor's Man Hunt (1946) as Irene Cotter
- Johnny O'Clock (1947) as Nelle Marchettis
- The Swordsman (1948) as Barbara Glowan
- The Man from Colorado (1948) as Caroline Emmet
- The Crooked Way (1949) as Nina Martin
- Davy Crockett, Indian Scout (1950) as Frances Oatman
- The Baron of Arizona (1950) as Sofia de Peralta – Reavis 'The Baroness'
- Stars in My Crown (1950) as Harriet Gray
- Cargo to Capetown (1950) as Kitty Mellar
- The Great Missouri Raid (1951) as Bee Moore
- Man in the Saddle (1951) as Nan Melotte
- Outlaw's Son (1957) as Ruth Sewall
- The Millionaire (TV series) episode "The Julia Conrad Story" (1959) as Julia Conrad, with co-star Robert Alda
