= Destination Big House =

1950 film by George Blair

- Theatrical release poster
- Directed by: George Blair
- Screenplay by: Eric Taylor
- Story by: Mortimer Braus
- Produced by: William T. Lackey
- Starring: Dorothy Patrick; Robert Rockwell; Jimmy Lydon; Robert Armstrong; Larry J. Blake; John Harmon
- Cinematography: John MacBurnie
- Edited by: Tony Martinelli
- Music by: Stanley Wilson
- Production company: Republic Pictures
- Distributed by: Republic Pictures
- Release date: August 25, 1950 (Los Angeles)
- Running time: 60 minutes
- Country: United States
- Language: English

Destination Big House is a 1950 American crime film directed by George Blair, written by Eric Taylor and starring Dorothy Patrick, Robert Rockwell, Jimmy Lydon, Robert Armstrong, Larry J. Blake and John Harmon. The film was released on June 1, 1950 by Republic Pictures.

== Cast ==
- Dorothy Patrick as Janet Brooks
- Robert Rockwell as Dr. Walter Phillips
- Jimmy Lydon as Freddy Brooks
- Robert Armstrong as Ed Somers
- Larry J. Blake as Pete Weiss
- John Harmon as Stubby Moore
- Claire Du Brey as Celia Brooks
- Richard Benedict as Joe Bruno
- Mickey Knox as Tony Savoni
- Danny Morton as Al Drury
- Mack Williams as Dr. Foster
- Olan Soule as Ralph Newell
- Peter Prouse as Ray Olsen
- Norman Field as Dr. Evans
