= 711 Ocean Drive =

1950 film by Joseph M. Newman

- Theatrical release poster
- Directed by: Joseph M. Newman
- Written by: Richard English; Francis Swann
- Produced by: Frank N. Seltzer
- Starring: Edmond O'Brien; Joanne Dru; Otto Kruger
- Cinematography: Franz Planer
- Edited by: Bert Jordan
- Music by: Sol Kaplan
- Color process: Black and white
- Production company: Frank Seltzer Productions
- Distributed by: Columbia Pictures
- Release date: July 1, 1950 (U.S.)
- Running time: 102 minutes
- Country: United States
- Language: English
- Budget: $300,000
- Box office: $1,550,000

711 Ocean Drive is a 1950 American crime film noir directed by Joseph M. Newman and starring Edmond O'Brien, Joanne Dru and Otto Kruger.

== Plot ==
Telephone technician Mal Granger, with knowledge of telephones and electronics, is hired by gangster Vince Walters to expand Walters' legitimate business that is a front for an illegal bookmaking operation. The expansion is a great success, and Granger also develops a better system for gathering information at racetracks. Granger wants a cut of the action and threatens to leave unless Walters makes him a 20% partner. Walters accedes to the demand.

When Walters tries to collect from a bookie, the bookie kills first Walters, then himself. Granger takes control of the wire service and the racket, making him a target for Lieutenant Wright of the Los Angeles police.

East Coast mobster Larry Mason is sent by boss Carl Stephans to persuade Granger to join his syndicate. Granger and Mason's wife Gail are attracted to each other.

Granger decides to accept a 50/50 split with his new partners. Some of the independent bookies do not like the new arrangement (and the extra 20% "protection" fee) and refuse to go along. They are roughed up by Syndicate goons.

Granger's assistant Trudy discovers that he is being shortchanged. Granger complains and is told that the shortfall is the result of "necessary expenses." He vows to get his money.

Granger and Gail pursue their attraction. After Mason beats Gail, Granger hires a hitman named Gizzi to kill Mason with a rifle. After the hit, Gizzi decides to blackmail Granger, who agrees to pay $25,000 at a rendezvous at the Malibu Pier, but there Gizzi announces he intends to become Granger's silent partner. Granger uses his car to crush Gizzi to death against the pier's railing, then sends the man's body over the side.

Using his telephone know-how, Granger places a call to Wright that makes it appear he is in Palm Springs and thus has an alibi for the murder. Wright tapes the call and hears a streetcar whistle; there are no streetcars in Palm Springs, so the police deduce he was actually in town. The police eventually match the paint from Granger's damaged car to Gizzi's murder.

Granger decides to retire and escape to Guatemala with Gail, but first he sets out to collect what is owed to him. With the help of Gail and Chippie, he taps into a phone line at a mob betting parlor in Las Vegas and pulls off a pass-post swindle, intercepting and taping race results to be rebroadcast after a two-minute delay, giving Gail and Chippie time to place substantial bets on the foregone winning horses. Chippie, however, is recognized by a man who bears a grudge against Granger. He tells Stephans, who has Chippie brought to him, and learns where Granger can be found. Stephans passes the information along to Wright, content to let the police rid him of a troublesome colleague.

With the police closing in, Granger and Gail flee to Boulder Dam, trying to cross the state line to get out of Wright's jurisdiction, but encounter a roadblock. They join a tour group and descend into the dam. Gail collapses from fatigue while running, Granger is shot and apparently killed before he can find his way to the Arizona side.

== Cast ==
- Edmond O'Brien as Mal Granger
- Joanne Dru as Gail Mason
- Otto Kruger as Carl Stephans
- Barry Kelley as Vince Walters
- Dorothy Patrick as Trudy Maxwell
- Don Porter as Larry Mason
- Howard St. John as Lieutenant Pete Wright
- Robert Osterloh as Gizzi
- Sammy White as Chippie Evans
- Cleo Moore as Mal's date (uncredited)
- Harry Lauter as man at the bar

== Reception ==
In a contemporary review, New York Times film critic Bosley Crowther panned the film, writing: "Despite some considerable advertising of 711 Ocean Drive as a daring and courageous revelation of the big bookmaking and gambling syndicates, this modest Columbia melodrama ... is no more than an average crime picture with some colorful but vague details thrown in. Certainly, no one who reads the papers with a fairly retentive eye can have any less comprehension of the gambling racket than is illustrated here. ... In short, this little picture, conventionally written but well photographed, does no more than any gangster picture in reminding us that gangsters are crooks."

However, Variety wrote well of the film: "Operations of the syndicates are given a realistic touch by the screenplay, and Joseph M. Newman's direction keeps the action at a fast pace. O'Brien is excellent as the hot-tempered, ambitious young syndicate chief."

Director Joseph M. Newman remarked: "[I]t was a tremendously successful picture ... that got good reviews and the studios all liked it. After that picture I was in great demand." Following his work on 711 Ocean Drive, Newman signed a two-year contract with Twentieth Century-Fox.
