= Ellis W. Carter =

American cinematographer (1906–1964)

- Born: November 2, 1906; Ashland, Oregon; United States
- Died: October 23, 1964 (aged 57); Long Beach, California; United States
- Occupation: Cinematographer
- Years active: 1930-1964 (film)

Ellis W. Carter (November 2, 1906 – October 23, 1964) was an American cinematographer.

== Selected filmography ==
- Big Town After Dark (1947)
- Speed to Spare (1948)
- Disaster (1948)
- Mr. Reckless (1948)
- Waterfront at Midnight (1948)
- El Paso (1949)
- Special Agent (1949)
- Gunmen of Abilene (1950)
- Hills of Oklahoma (1950)
- The Old Frontier (1950)
- The Blonde Bandit (1950)
- Lonely Heart Bandits (1950)
- Havana Rose (1951)
- The Magic Carpet (1951)
- The Barefoot Mailman (1951)
- Sunny Side of the Street (1951)
- The Texas Rangers (1951)
- Indian Uprising (1952)
- Thief of Damascus (1952)
- Sound Off (1952)
- Outlaw Women (1952)
- California Conquest (1952)
- The Royal African Rifles (1953)
- Running Wild (1955)
- The Black Dakotas (1954)
- The River Changes (1956)
- Flight to Hong Kong (1956)
- A Day of Fury (1956)
- Damn Citizen (1958)
- Night of the Quarter Moon (1959)
- The Leech Woman (1960)
- Seven Ways from Sundown (1960)
- Sex Kittens Go to College (1960)
- The Purple Gang (1960)
- The Wizard of Baghdad (1961)
- Pirates of Tortuga (1961)
- The Second Time Around (1961)
- Showdown (1963)
- Hootenanny Hoot (1963)
- Kissin' Cousins (1964)

== Bibliography ==
- James L. Neibaur. The Elvis Movies. Rowman & Littlefield, 2014.
