= Lonely Heart Bandits =

1950 film

- Theatrical release poster
- Directed by: George Blair
- Screenplay by: Gene Lewis
- Produced by: Stephen Auer
- Starring: Dorothy Patrick; John Eldredge; Barbra Fuller; Robert Rockwell; Ann Doran; Richard Travis
- Cinematography: Ellis W. Carter
- Edited by: Harry Keller
- Music by: Stanley Wilson
- Production company: Republic Pictures
- Distributed by: Republic Pictures
- Release date: August 29, 1950
- Running time: 60 minutes
- Country: United States
- Language: English

Lonely Heart Bandits is a 1950 American drama film directed by George Blair and written by Gene Lewis. The film stars Dorothy Patrick, John Eldredge, Barbra Fuller, Robert Rockwell, Ann Doran and Richard Travis. It was released on August 29, 1950 by Republic Pictures.

== Plot ==
Two con artists join forces and pose as brother and sister. The man then meets rich widows through the personal advertisements sections of newspapers, marries them and both kill the widows for their money.

== Cast ==
- Dorothy Patrick as Louise Curtis
- John Eldredge as Tony Morell / Wade Antrim
- Barbra Fuller as Laurel Vernon
- Robert Rockwell as Police Lt. Carroll
- Ann Doran as Nancy Crane
- Richard Travis as Aaron Hunt
- Dorothy Granger as Duchess Belle
- Eric Sinclair as Bobby Crane
- Kathleen Freeman as Bertha Martin
- Frank Kreig as Cal
- Harry Cheshire as Sheriff Polk
- William Schallert as Dave Clark
- Howard Negley as Elmer Jayson
- John Crawford as Stevedore
- Eddie Dunn as Sheriff York
- Sammy McKim as Jimmy Ward
- Leonard Penn as Detective Stanley
