= Under Mexicali Stars =

1950 film by George Blair

- Theatrical release poster
- Directed by: George Blair
- Screenplay by: Robert Creighton Williams
- Produced by: Melville Tucker
- Starring: Rex Allen; Dorothy Patrick; Roy Barcroft; Buddy Ebsen; Percy Helton; Walter Coy
- Cinematography: John MacBurnie
- Edited by: Harold Minter
- Music by: Stanley Wilson
- Production company: Republic Pictures
- Distributed by: Republic Pictures
- Release date: November 20, 1950
- Running time: 67 minutes
- Country: United States
- Language: English

Under Mexicali Stars is a 1950 American Western film directed by George Blair, written by Robert Creighton Williams and starring Rex Allen, Dorothy Patrick, Roy Barcroft, Buddy Ebsen, Percy Helton and Walter Coy. It was released on November 20, 1950, by Republic Pictures.

== Cast ==
- Rex Allen as Rex Allen aka Mike Jordan
- Dorothy Patrick as Madeline Wellington
- Roy Barcroft as Henchman Hays Lawson
- Buddy Ebsen as Homer Oglethorpe
- Percy Helton as Nap Wellington
- Walter Coy as Giles Starkey
- Steve Darrell as Sheriff Tom Meadows
- Alberto Morin as Inspector Arturo Gómez
- Ray Walker as Robert B. Handley
- Frank Ferguson as Counterfeitor Goldie
- Stanley Andrews as Race Announcer
- Robert Bice as Deputy Bob
