= Thunder Pass (1954 film) =

1954 film

- Directed by: Frank McDonald.
- Written by: Fred Eggers; Tom Hubbard; George Van Marter
- Produced by: Robert L. Lippert; Robert A. Nunes
- Starring: Dane Clark; Dorothy Patrick; Andy Devine
- Edited by: Ace Herman
- Music by: Edward J. Kay
- Production company: Lippert Pictures
- Distributed by: Lippert Pictures
- Release date: September 20, 1954
- Running time: 76 minutes
- Country: United States
- Language: English

Thunder Pass is a 1954 American Western film directed by Frank McDonald and starring Dane Clark, Dorothy Patrick and Andy Devine.

== Plot ==
A cavalry unit escorts a group of civilians through dangerous territory inhabited by Indians on the warpath

== Cast ==
- Dane Clark as Captain Dave Storm
- Dorothy Patrick as Murdock
- Andy Devine as Injun
- Raymond Burr as Tulsa
- Charles Fredericks as McCurdy
- Mary Ellen Kay as Charity Hemp
- John Carradine as Bergstrom
- Raymond Hatton as Ancient
- Nestor Paiva as Daniel Slaughter
- Tom Hubbard as Barnett
- Rick Vallin as Reeger
- Tommy Cook as Rogers
- Paul McGuire as Charlie Hemp
- Elizabeth Harrower as Mrs. Hemp
- William Wilkerson as Chief Growling Bear
- Gordon Wynn as Dalstead
- Fred Gabourie as Indian
- Kenneth Alton as Black Eagle

== Production ==
Filming started 17 May 1954 in Apple Valley and took 12 days.
