= Singing Guns =

1950 film by R. G. Springsteen

- Theatrical release poster
- Directed by: R. G. Springsteen
- Screenplay by: Dorrell McGowan; Stuart E. McGowan
- Based on: Singing Guns by Max Brand
- Produced by: Abe Lyman; Melville Tucker
- Starring: Vaughn Monroe
- Cinematography: Reggie Lanning
- Edited by: Richard L. Van Enger
- Music by: Nathan Scott
- Production company: Palomar Pictures
- Distributed by: Republic Pictures
- Release date: February 28, 1950
- Running time: 91 minutes
- Country: United States
- Language: English

Singing Guns is a 1950 American Trucolor Western film directed by R. G. Springsteen and starring Vaughn Monroe. The film features three songs by Monroe.

"Mule Train", one of the songs featured in this 1950 Republic Western and sung by Vaughn Monroe, was nominated for the Academy Award for Best Original Song in 1950, but lost out to "Mona Lisa" from Captain Carey, U.S.A..

== Plot ==
A wanted outlaw named Rhiannon has stashed a million dollars' worth of gold stolen from the Great Western Mining Company. The sheriff from the nearby town of Goldville, Jim Caradac, hides inside a stagecoach reported to be carrying more of the company's gold. Rhiannon hold up a stagecoach carrying Caradac and Caradac's girlfriend, Nan Morgan. Caradac attempts to stop the robbery, but Rhiannon quickly disarms him. When he opens the strong box and finds only sand inside, Rhiannon decides to teach the gloating Caradac a lesson. He follows the stage to the edge of town and forces Caradac to walk down the middle of the street dressed in a pair of women's underwear, much to the amusement of the residents.

Caradac chases Rhiannon who gets the drop on him and shoots him from a distance. Rhiannon later returns to bury the lawman. Rhiannon approaches the body and rolls Caradac over only to find himself staring down the barrel of a six-shooter. When Caradac tries to convince him to take him to the hidden gold, Rhiannon manages to knock him off balance and shoots him. Rhiannon takes Caradac to Dr. Jonathan Mark, who is also the town preacher. Rhiannon tells the doctor that his name is John Gwyn and that he found Caradac by chance while he was riding. The doctor says that Caradac needs a blood transfusion and the doctor 'convinces' Rhiannon to volunteer to be the donor by drugging him.

When he wakes, Rhiannon discovers his gun is missing, and the doctor explains that he drugged him to prevent him from changing his mind about the transfusion. A judge then enters the room to deputize Rhiannon, and he agrees to take up Caradac's duties until he can return to work. Rhiannon agrees so he will have to opportunity to rob a large shipment meant to go out in three weeks. That evening, Rhiannon receives his first call from Nan, who asks for help ejecting a drunken man, Mike Murphy from her saloon. He also confronts the local man who manages the local branch of the mining company, Richards. By Sunday morning, the jail is packed with drunks, so Rhiannon releases them and makes each one promise to attend church or face a $10 fine.

When the Great Western Mine catches on fire and several miners are trapped inside, Rhiannon risks his own life to save them, including Mike. Seeing him with his face half covered, Nan recognizes Rhiannon as the outlaw who attacked her stagecoach and decides to report it to Jim, who has since partially recovered. The doctor has known all along and wanted to work on convincing Rhiannon to go straight. Caradac agrees to allow the doctor to continue to try, but says he must get him to give up the gold before the big shipment goes out. Nan also wants to convince him to give up the location of the gold, but only because she wants the $50,000 reward.

The doctor confronts Rhiannon about his past and Rhiannon tells him how the Great Western Mining Company had claim-jumped him twice and the law had done nothing about it. Caradac allows Rhiannon to ride out with the gold shipment intent on following Rhiannon to the gold. The doctor follows the stage and gives Rhiannon a prescription to fill when he delivers the gold, Rhiannon has a change of heart and decides not to rob the stage. Caradac arrests him anyway and warns him that he will be charged with stagecoach robbery unless he reveals the location of his hideout and the gold, but Rhiannon refuses to talk.

Later, Nan with the aid of Mike helps Rhiannon escape from jail, and by pretending to be romantically interested in him, convinces him to take her to his hideout where he has hidden the stolen gold. Nan pistol whips Rhiannon and flees with the gold. Caradac reveals that he gave Nan the key to the jail cell and she will tell them location of the gold. Two days later, Rhiannon rides back to town and confronts Caradac believing that Caradac set him up with Nan.

Caradac, believing Nan has double-crossed him, has spent the last two days in the saloon. Rhiannon and Caradac place their guns on the table and agree to go for them the next time the saloon doors open. Doc beats them both to the guns and gives them a dressing down for their behavior. Richards gets the jump on them and tries to force Rhiannon to give up the location of gold. Caradac and Rhiannon fight together and defeat Richards and his men. Rhiannon surrenders himself, just as Nan and Mike return with a receipt for the gold. Caradac gives Rhiannon his blessing. Doc is glad that Rhiannon has gone straight.

== Cast ==
- Vaughn Monroe as Rhiannon AKA John Gwyn
- Ella Raines as Nan Morgan
- Walter Brennan as Dr. Jonathan Mark
- Ward Bond as Sheriff Jim Caradac
- Jeff Corey as Richards
- Barry Kelley as Mike Murphy
- Harry Shannon as Judge Waller
- Tom Fadden as Express Agent
- Ralph Dunn as Traveler
- Rex Lease as Stage Driver
- George Chandler as Smitty the Piano Player
- Billy Gray as Albert
- Mary Bear as Albert's Mother
- Jimmie Dodd as Stage Guard

== Soundtrack ==
Mule Train
Written by Johnny Lange, Fred Glickman and Hy Heath
Sung by Vaughn Monroe
Singing My Way Back Home
Written by Vaughn Monroe (as Wilton Moore) and Al Vann (as Al Van)
Sung by Vaughn Monroe
Mexicali Trail
Written by Sunny Skylar and Vaughn Monroe (as Wilton Moore)
Sung by Vaughn Monroe
