= Barbra Fuller =

American actress (1921–2024)

- Fuller in 1945
- Born: Barbara Deane Fuller; July 31, 1921; Nahant, Massachusetts, U.S.
- Died: May 14, 2024 (aged 102); Woodland Hills, Los Angeles, California, U.S.
- Occupation: Actress
- Years active: 1930s–1973
- Spouse: Lash LaRue (m. 1951; div. 1952)

Barbra Fuller (born Barbara Deane Fuller; July 31, 1921 – May 14, 2024) was an American actress.

== Career ==
Fuller signed a contract with Republic Pictures in 1949. Her father Ralph Fuller died when she was three years old. She had worked in radio shows since the 1930s. She appeared frequently in B-movies and television series in the 1950s. She changed her hair color frequently for film roles. Its hue varied from platinum to brunette in her four movies released by Republic Pictures in 1950. She returned to blonde as Laurel Vernon in Lonely Heart Bandits (1950). Her first screen credit is for The Red Menace (1949). This was followed by roles in Flame of Youth (1949) and Crosswinds (1951). In The Red Menace she played "Mollie O'Flaherty", a character used by the Communist Party as bait. In City of Bad Men (1953), a Western adventure, she played a minor character. Afterward, she was mostly involved in television work. Her last parts as a movie actress came in How Sweet It Is! (1968) and The Roommates (1973).

== Radio ==
Fuller acted in a number of soap operas. She played Claudia in One Man's Family, winner of the prestigious Peabody Award and arguably the first soap opera having begun in 1932 and running three decades. She did her first radio work in Chicago between the ages of 9 and 11. By age 18 she had appeared in 25 radio serials. Fuller was heard in Whispering Streets, The Guiding Light, Ma Perkins, Today's Children, Scattergood Baines, Madame Courageous, Road of Life, and Stepmother.

== Television ==
Fuller's television performances are numerous, beginning with a 1953 episode of Adventures of Superman. Other series in which she participated include Four Star Playhouse (1955–1956), The Ford Television Theatre (1957), Trackdown (1958), State Trooper (1958), Colgate Theatre (1958), My Three Sons (1960), Perry Mason (1960, 1964), and Daniel Boone (1970).

== Personal life ==
Barbara Deane Fuller was born in Nahant, Massachusetts, on July 31, 1921. She married Western motion picture star Lash LaRue on February 23, 1951, in Yuma, Arizona. They had a godson, child actor J.P. Sloane and later author, television commentator, and Dr. J.P. Sloane. The couple divorced on June 2, 1952.

Fuller died on the morning of May 14, 2024, at the age of 102.

== Sources ==
- "Broadway Comedienne Joins Hope Picture". Los Angeles Times. June 3, 1949. p. B7.
- "'Red Menace' Deals Strong Blow To Communistic Idea". Los Angeles Times. June 10, 1949. p. B6.
