= The Silver Star (film) =

1955 film

- Directed by: Richard Bartlett
- Screenplay by: Richard Bartlett; Ian MacDonald
- Story by: Richard Bartlett; Ian MacDonald
- Produced by: Earle Lyon
- Starring: Edgar Buchanan; Marie Windsor; Lon Chaney Jr. Earle Lyon; Richard Bartlett; Barton MacLane
- Cinematography: Guy Roe
- Edited by: George Reid
- Music by: Leon Klatzkin
- Production companies: L&B Productions
- Distributed by: Lippert Pictures
- Release date: April 8, 1955 (United States)
- Running time: 73 minutes
- Country: United States
- Language: English

The Silver Star is a 1955 American Western film directed by Richard Bartlett and starring Edgar Buchanan, Marie Windsor, Lon Chaney Jr., Earle Lyon and Richard Bartlett, Barton MacLane.

== Plot ==
Gregg Leech is following his father and grandfather by becoming sheriff but admits to his fiance Childress and retired sheriff Will Dowdy he does not like the idea (in part because both his father and grandfather died in office). Dowdy tells him the job will get easier and it isn't just about shooting people, it's about keeping the town peaceful.

Leech visits neighbor Ward who is going into town wearing a gun, which is against the law. Leech tells him to remove his gun, when Ward tries to draw his gun Leech shoots him in the wrist and then disarms him.

King Daniels and two associates ride into town and then tear down Karen's banner over the entrance to her father's hotel, welcoming the new sheriff. Young man Bainey tells them that they aren't allowed to wear their guns in town and they should put the sign back. They refuse and there is a scuffle but the cowboys don't take Harmon seriously and he leaves telling them that the sheriff will sort them out. Karen and her father ask the cowboys who they are and what they want in town. King tells them they want to see the sheriff, even though they don't know him, and they are going to kill him unless he leaves town by 8 o'clock.

Leech finds out that there are some townspeople that don't want a sheriff but when he asks Downey he says there are always some people in a town that want things to be different and not to worry. Karen arrives and tells Gregg that King is going to kill him. Gregg goes to confront King and his men but changes his mind and rides away. When one of the townsmen tells him he should do something about King and his men Gregg tells him a sheriff shouldn't do that on his own and when the town organizes a posse he will help them. He then tries to get the stationmaster to stop the train so he can leave town on it but the stationmaster refuses.

Dowdy goes to the hotel to find out what King wants and learns that he has been paid to kill the sheriff. Dowdy tries to provoke him but King says he would get no money for killing him. Dowdy visits lawyer John Harmon who lost the election for sheriff. Dowdy suspects Harmon may have been the one who hired King.

Gregg tries to hire a buggy from blacksmith Henry "Tiny" Longtree, but the price is too high so he says he'll think about it and come back later. The blacksmith asks if he wants it "about quarter to eight".

Gregg plans to leave town and asks Karen to go with him. She says she won't go with a coward. Gregg tries to resign so Dowdy takes the badge and says he will do the sheriff's job. He takes Gregg's gun and rides into town. Eventually Gregg follows him.

Dowdy takes cover outside the hotel and calls King out, then hides in the shadows down the street. King comes out and tells him to go home so Dowdy shoots at him, missing. In the ensuing gunfight Dowdy shoots one of King's men and is joined by Gregg who has no gun. Gregg gets a gun from the blacksmith's shop. Dowdy then shoots King's other man. While King is reloading after shooting it out with Gregg, Dowdy passes by and shoots at him but King shoots him instead. While Gregg and Karen are tending to Dowdy King calls Gregg to come out. After a gunfight throughout town Gregg finally kills King. He finds a note in his pocket. Gregg then meets Bainey who explains that Harmon and Longtree are the cause of all the trouble. Bainey then insists on helping Gregg go after Harmon. Harmon makes a run for it and Longtree knocks Bainey down. Gregg catches Harmon and meets Bainey who says he killed Longtree who was choking him.

== Cast ==
- Edgar Buchanan as Will 'Bill' Dowdy (as Edgar Buchanon)
- Marie Windsor as Karen Childress
- Lon Chaney Jr as John W. Harmon (as Lon Chaney)
- Earle Lyon as Sheriff Gregg Leech
- Richard Bartlett as King Daniels
- Barton MacLane as Henry 'Tiny' Longtree (as Barton McLane)
- Morris Ankrum as Charlie Childress
- Edith Evanson as Belle Dowdy
- Michael Whalen as Shakespeare
- Steve Rowland as Bainey
- Robert Karnes as Ward Blythe (as Bob Karnes)
- Earl Hansen as
- Tim Graham as Happy
- Bill Andres as Daniels Henchman
- Jill Richards as Stella
- Chris O'Brien as
- Charles Knapp
