= The Lonesome Trail (1955 film) =

1955 film

- Directed by: Richard Bartlett
- Starring: Wayne Morris; John Agar; Edgar Buchanan
- Music by: Leon Klatzkin (as Leo Klatzkin)
- Distributed by: Lippert Pictures
- Release date: July 1, 1955
- Running time: 73 minutes
- Country: United States
- Language: English

The Lonesome Trail is a 1955 American Western film starring John Agar, Wayne Morris, Douglas Fowley, Edgar Buchanan, and Adele Jergens.

It was produced for Lippert Pictures.

== Plot ==
A recently demobilized soldier's property and girl are taken from him by a greedy rancher whose henchmen have control over the town, but the ex-soldier plans a decisive showdown with his tormentors to right the wrongs. Unusual in that halfbreed hero John Agar conducts the final shootout, not with a six gun or rifle, but with a bow and arrow.

== Cast ==
- John Agar as Johnny Rush
- Wayne Morris as Dandy Dayton
- Margia Dean as Pat Wells
- Adele Jergens as Mae
- Edgar Buchanan as Dan Wells
- Douglas Fowley as Crazy Charley Bonesteel
- Earle Lyon as Harold 'Hal' Brecker Jr.
- Richard Bartlett as Larry Baker
- Ian McDonald as Gonaga
- Diane DeLaire as Mrs. Wells
