= Once Upon a Texas Train =

1988 TV film

- Home video cover art
- Written by: Burt Kennedy
- Directed by: Burt Kennedy
- Starring: Willie Nelson; Richard Widmark
- Composer: Arthur B. Rubinstein
- Country of origin: United States
- Original language: English

Production
- Executive producers: Doreen Borgesen; Robert A. Papazian
- Producer: Burt Kennedy
- Cinematography: Ken Lamkin
- Editor: Warner E. Leighton

Original release
- Network: CBS
- Release: January 3, 1988

Once Upon a Texas Train (also known as Texas Guns) is a 1988 American comedy Western television film, directed by Burt Kennedy and starring Willie Nelson and Richard Widmark. The film includes western movie regulars such as Chuck Connors from The Rifleman, Jack Elam from John Wayne's Rio Lobo. Angie Dickinson John Wayne's movie Rio Bravo. Royal Dano from Audie Murphy's Red Badge of Courage, and Gene Evans from The Shadow Riders. Hank Worden from numerous John Wayne movies such as Big Jake and The Searchers cameos in the film as well.

== Plot ==
The movie opens with a train robbery in Texas, but a group of Texas Rangers are waiting for the robbers, and stop them. Twenty years later, the head of the outlaw gang, John Henry Lee, is paroled on good behavior, but the same day he gets out, he and his brother Charlie Lee rob a bank in Del Rio of $20,000 in gold.

Captain Oren Hayes, the Texas Ranger who arrested John Henry and ensured his parole, goes after him once more, knowing that he will try to pull off the same robbery he bungled 20 years before for revenge. Viewers are introduced to his 'gang', all of whom are well past their prime. It is also revealed both John Henry Lee and Captain Oren Hayes fought for the affections of Maggie, whom married Oren Hayes. This is also one of the reasons for chasing John Henry as Oren wants John Henry locked up away from Maggie. As John Henry gathers his 'old' gang to help him, Hayes does the same with his retired Texas Rangers, all whom no longer have the skills they once had twenty years ago. John Henry's gang includes his brother Charlie Lee the getaway driver, Kelly Sutton the tin-horn gambler, Fargo Parker the gunfighter, and Nitro Jones the demolitions expert. The old outlaws lack the skills they once had twenty years ago. For example, Kelly can no longer handle his liquor, Nitro cannot blow things up properly, Charlie is careless driving a wagon, and Fargo now struggles to use his rifle such as cocking it. Oren Hayes recruits his Texas Rangers through telegram using the code-word 'Brazos.' The Texas Rangers include Nash Crawford the gunfighter, Jason Fitch the scout, and Gentleman George Asque the well-mannered Ranger who rides a donkey. The viewers see each old Texas Ranger receive their Telegram with the code-word. Jason, who once had perfect eyesight like a hawk during the day and an owl at night, is nearly blind to where he cannot see his brother at night at a very close distance. The telegram deliverer arrives on his bicycle and gives Jason his telegram which gives him the code-word Brazos and instructs him to meet Oren in three days. Jason does not have a horse so the telegram deliverer loans Jason his bicycle so Jason does not have to walk three days. Nash still longing for the bygone days is frustrated living in a retirement home and teaches an old resident to duel. To Nash's frustration, the old man is horrible at dueling and gives up when Nash critiques him. During mail-call, everyone receives a letter except Nash. Nash becomes upset about not receiving any mail until the old man gives Nash his telegram which he received that morning and held on to it for Nash. Nash reads the telegram for the old man which reads the same as Jason's telegram. Gentleman George is now not so gentle and is fighting in a saloon. He is knocked out after receiving his telegram, reading the code-word, and laughing.

Meanwhile, a group of young outlaws led by Cotton has their own plans for the gold the elderly outlaws have. After the old outlaws discover the Texas railroad they robbed twenty years ago was torn down (and after a good laugh at being old fools), John Henry decides to take the money back to Del Rio as he no longer has any use of it. However, the young outlaws take the old outlaws hostage so that no there is no trace of where the money went. Along the way they meet Bates Boley and Meg Boley, whom Cotton kisses and flirts with. After stealing from their hosts, both young and old outlaws continue to a deserted town where the Texas Rangers catch up with them.

After John Henry threatens to blow up everyone by throwing dynamite into a wood-stove, the young outlaws agree to throw down their weapons and have a stand-off with the old outlaws. John Henry Lee recruits the reluctant and stubborn Captain Oren Hayes to join in the stand-off. That night, John Henry tells Oren he is stubborn and Maggie only had a crush on him (since he was exciting and Oren was dull). The next day, the morning of the duel, the guns belonging to the young outlaws are given back in a wagon and they stand in the street. While the young outlaws watch, the old men walk out and take their place on the other side of the street. The young outlaws laugh at the 'old men' standing against them until the men start walking towards them. A gun fight ensues with the Texas Rangers and old outlaws as the victors. The young outlaws and old outlaws are taken prisoner afterwards.

The men stop at the Boley ranch again where the stagecoach arrives and stops. Maggie steps out of the stagecoach and says goodbye to John Henry Lee. Maggie reaffirms Oren was being stubborn when told she only loved him. Afterwards, Oren Hayes lets the old outlaws go as his Texas Rangers agree that John Henry was going to return the money. As the old outlaws leave, they hear a Texas train and gallop full-speed towards it.

== Cast ==
- Willie Nelson as John Henry Lee (leader of old gang)
- Richard Widmark as Oren Hayes (former captain of the Texas Rangers)
- Shaun Cassidy as Cotton (leader of the young outlaws)
- Chuck Connors as Nash Crawford (former sergeant of Texas Rangers)
- Ken Curtis as Kelly Sutton (John Henry's gang)
- Royal Dano as Nitro Jones (John Henry's gang)
- Jack Elam as Jason Fitch (former Texas Ranger)
- Gene Evans as Fargo Parker (John Henry's gang)
- Kevin McCarthy as the Governor
- Dub Taylor as Charlie Lee (John Henry Lee's brother)
- Stuart Whitman as George Asque (former Texas Ranger)
- Angie Dickinson as Maggie Hayes (married to Oren Hayes)
- Jeb Stuart Adams as Billy Bates (young outlaw)
- David Michael O'Neill as John Young (young outlaw)
- John Calkins as John Brown (young outlaw)
- Red West as Bates Boley
- Clare Carey as Meg Boley
- Don Collier as the Warden
- Dennis Fimple as the Telegrapher
- Harry Carey, Jr. as Herald Fitch (billed as Harry Carey) (Jason's brother)
- Hank Worden as the Old Man in the rest home

== Production ==
Filming locations included Arizona's Old Tucson Studios and Mescal, Arizona. Scenes involving Willie Nelson were filmed inside a saloon in Mescal on September 21, 1987. Locomotive Number 40, located at the Nevada Northern Railway Museum in Ely, Nevada, was used as the film's train.

Director Burt Kennedy used several aging Western stars from years past as the group of aged Rangers, as well as the outlaw gang - former Rifleman actor Chuck Connors as Nash Crawford, past Cimarron Strip marshal Stuart Whitman as Gentleman George Asque, and former Dakotas deputy Jack Elam as Jason Fitch making up the retired rangers. John Henry Lee's aged gang consisted of former Gunsmoke deputy Festus Hagen (Ken Curtis) as Kelly Sutton and Western character actors Royal Dano as Nitro Jones, Gene Evans as Fargo Parker, and Dub Taylor as John Henry's brother Charlie Lee. Angie Dickinson had also appeared in several Western films and shows. Another veteran actor, Kevin McCarthy, made an appearance as the Governor.

The Texas Rangers characters originally appeared almost 20 years before in the unsold television pilot and TV-movie broadcast in 1969 on ABC, The Over-the-Hill Gang, which was followed by The Over-the-Hill Gang Rides Again (the sequel did not feature the Captain Oren Hayes character) starring Walter Brennan as Nash Crawford, Pat O'Brien as Captain Oren Hayes, Chill Wills as Gentleman George Asque, and Edgar Buchanan as Jason Fitch. Elam had the distinction of appearing as the crooked sheriff in the first Over-The-Hill film and then assuming the role once played by Buchanan two decades later in Texas Train. One difference between this film and The Over-the-Hill Gang is that first movie portrayed the Rangers as too old to hold their own, while Texas Train showed they could still hold their own against younger competition.

== Release ==
Once Upon a Texas Train premiered as a CBS Sunday Movie on CBS on January 3, 1988. The film was the sixth most-watched television program for the week ending January 3, and was also the third-most watched television film of the 1987-88 television season, with 21.2 million viewers.

=== Reception ===
Terry Atkinson of the Los Angeles Times wrote that Kennedy "didn't seem to have quite thought out his promising, then faltering, tale. […] But until things go really awry toward the end, Kennedy provides 'Train' with plenty of the same gently satirical humor and authentic big-sky feeling he gave his fine 1969 feature Support Your Local Sheriff! His smoothly professional direction is full of fine touches, enhanced by Ken Lamkin's photography and Warner Leighton's editing."
