= Marie Windsor =

American actress (1919–2000)

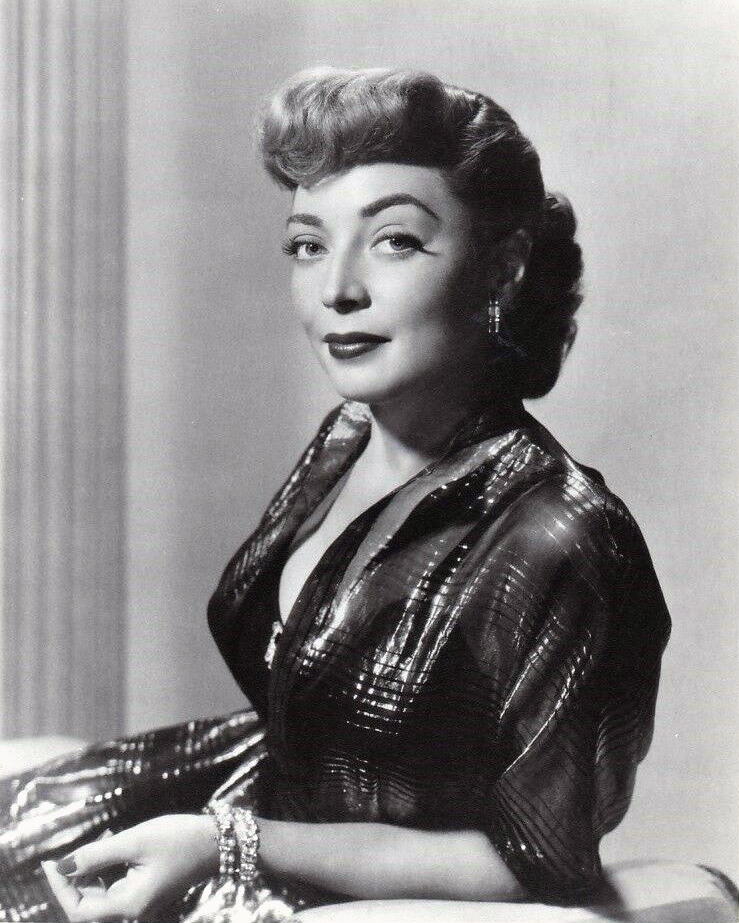
- Windsor in 1956
- Born: Emily Marie Bertelsen; December 11, 1919; Marysvale, Utah, U.S.
- Died: December 10, 2000 (aged 80); Beverly Hills, California, U.S.
- Resting place: Mountain View Cemetery, Marysvale, Utah, U.S.
- Occupation: Actress
- Years active: 1939–1991
- Spouse(s): Ted Steele (1946; annulled); Jack Hupp (1954–2000, her death)
- Children: 1

Marie Windsor (born Emily Marie Bertelsen; December 11, 1919 – December 10, 2000) was an American actress known for her femme fatale characters in the classic film noir features Force of Evil, The Narrow Margin and The Killing. Windsor's height (5'9", 175 cm) created problems for her in scenes with all but the tallest actors. She was the female lead in so many B movies that she became dubbed the "Queen" of the genre.

== Early years ==
Windsor was born on December 11, 1919 in Marysvale, Utah, the daughter of Lane and Etta Bertelsen. She graduated from Marysvale High School in 1934, doing a "musical reading" as part of the graduation exercises. She attended Brigham Young University, where she participated in dramatic productions. She was described in a 1939 newspaper article as "an accomplished athlete ... expert as a dancer, swimmer, horsewoman, and plays golf, tennis and skis."

In 1939, Windsor was chosen from a group of 81 contestants to be queen of Covered Wagon Days in Salt Lake City, Utah. She was unofficially appointed "Miss Utah of 1939" by her hometown’s Chamber of Commerce, and trained for the stage under Hollywood actress and coach Maria Ouspenskaya.

Voluptuous and leggy, but unusually tall (5'9") for a starlet of her generation, Windsor felt that she was handicapped when playing opposite actors of average stature (claiming she had to progressively bend at the knees walking across the room in a scene with John Garfield). As she later recalled, a production with the 6’5” Forrest Tucker as co-star made her happy with finally getting a male lead who was her 'own size'.

In later years, thanks to her early screen success, Windsor was able to pursue her studies more extensively, primarily with Stella Adler and also at the Lee Strasberg Theatre Institute.

Windsor worked in radio in Salt Lake City before moving to California. In California, she worked as a model for glamor photographer Paul Hesse.

== Stage ==
In 1940, after her move to Hollywood and entering Ouspenskaya's drama school, she appeared in the play Forty Thousand Smiths, her first use of the stage name "Marie Windsor". The next year she appeared in Once in a Lifetime at the Pasadena Playhouse. She also played a villain in a New York production of Follow the Girls. Years later, in the 1980s, she returned to the stage. In 1986, Marie Windsor played Francis Carson in the premiere of The Bar Off Melrose by Oliver Hailey.

== Film ==
After working for several years as a telephone operator, a stage and radio actress, a stand-in for Bette Davis, a cigarette girl at the Mocambo nightclub, and a bit part and extra player in films, Windsor began playing feature parts on the big screen in 1947. Discovered by Arthur Hornblow, Jr. while working at the Mocambo, after conversing with him one night in tears over the inability of paying her rent, out of both the kindness of his respective heart and taking notice of her true potential being in a place where he knew himself that she did not belong, he arranged for her to begin a career in the film industry per a role in All American Co-Ed (1941) which not only relieved Windsor of her financial distress, it likewise allowed her to formally begin her career per her first credited acting role.

Her first film contract, with Warner Bros. in 1942, resulted from her writing jokes and submitting them to Jack Benny. Windsor said she submitted the gags under the name M.E. Windsor "because I was afraid he might be prejudiced against a woman gag writer". When Benny finally met Windsor, "he was stunned by her good looks" and had a producer sign her to a contract. After a tenure with Metro-Goldwyn-Mayer in which the studio "signed her, put her in two small roles and then promptly forgot her", she signed a seven-year contract in 1948 with Enterprise Productions.

The actress' first memorable role in 1948 was with John Garfield in Force of Evil playing seductress Edna Tucker. She had roles in numerous 1950s film noirs, notably The Sniper, The Narrow Margin, City That Never Sleeps, and the Stanley Kubrick heist film, The Killing, in which she played Elisha Cook, Jr.'s, scheming wife. She also made her first foray into science fiction with the release of Cat-Women of the Moon (1953). Windsor co-starred with Randolph Scott in The Bounty Hunter (1954).

During the 1950s, she became known for playing adulterous wives, bad girls, femme fatales, gangster molls, female gang leaders, and women with a past. She subsequently received packages in her mail containing Bibles with passages concerning sin underlined and warnings that she would go to hell if she did not repent. She expressed that the messages frightened and disturbed her, and she reported the letters to the police.

== Television ==
Later, Windsor moved to television. She appeared as "The Mutton Puncher" in season 3 of Cheyenne, in 1957. She appeared in 1954 as Belle Starr in the premiere episode of Stories of the Century. In 1962, she played Ann Jesse, a woman dying in childbirth, in the episode "The Wanted Man" of Lawman. Windsor appeared in the first season of Barnaby Jones; episode "Twenty Million Alibis" (May 5, 1973).

Windsor worked consistently through the 1960s, 1970s and 1980s. She appeared on programs such as Cheyenne, Bat Masterson, Bonanza,Tales of Wells Fargo, Yancy Derringer, 77 Sunset Strip, Maverick (in the 1957 episode titled "The Quick and the Dead" with James Garner and Gerald Mohr as Doc Holliday) and (in the 1962 episode "Epitaph for a Gambler" with Jack Kelly), The Red Skelton Hour, Hawaiian Eye, Perry Mason, Bourbon Street Beat, The F.B.I., The Incredible Hulk, Rawhide, Adam-12, Mannix, Charlie's Angels, General Hospital, Salem's Lot, and Murder, She Wrote. Windsor remained on screen once or so annually up to the 1990s, playing her final role and going into retirement in 1991 at the age of 72.

== Recognition ==
Windsor has a star in at 1549 N. Vine Street in the Motion Pictures section of the Hollywood Walk of Fame. It was dedicated January 19, 1983.

In 1987, Windsor received the Los Angeles Drama Critics Circle Award for best actress for her work in The Bar Off Melrose. She also received the Ralph Morgan Award from the Screen Actors Guild for her service on the organization's board of directors.

During the annual Turner Classic Movies Summer Under the Stars, Windsor was honored with an entire day of her filmography programmed on Friday, August 21, 2026.

Windsor is one of six classic film noir actresses profiled in film historian Eddie Muller's book Dark City Dames: The Women Who Defined Film Noir, and she is featured on the book's front cover.

== Personal life ==
Windsor was married briefly to bandleader Ted Steele. They were wed April 21, 1946, in Marysvale, Utah. They divorced that same year (an item in a 1953 newspaper column says that the marriage was ended by annulment, not divorce).

In July 1950, newspaper columnist Louella Parsons reported, "Marie Windsor has set her marriage to Alex Lunciman, a Beverly Hills stock broker, for October".

She married realtor Jack Hupp, a member of the 1936 U.S. Olympic basketball team. Hupp had his own family connection with show business; he was the son of actor Earle Rodney. Hupp, with whom Windsor had a son, Richard Rodney, was inducted posthumously into the University of Southern California (USC) Athletic Hall of Fame in 2007. Hupp had a son, Chris, from a prior marriage.

In order to avert her being labeled as a "Dragon Lady", she underwent plastic surgery hoping it would soften her features and in turn help her attain more sympathetic roles.

Windsor was politically conservative, a member of the Screen Actors Guild, and supportive of the Motion Picture and Television Fund.

After her acting career ended, Windsor became a painter, homemaker, and sculptor.

Windsor was also a lifelong member of The Church of Jesus Christ of Latter-day Saints.

Windsor was a registered Republican and a member of the Motion Picture Alliance for the Preservation of American Ideals as well as both the Hollywood Republican Committee and the Bel-Air Republican Women's Group. She actively campaigned for several Republican presidential candidates, including Dwight D. Eisenhower, Barry Goldwater, and Ronald Reagan. During the era of the House Un-American Activities Committee (HUAC) blacklists, Windsor noted in interviews that while she stayed out of the active political turmoil, she personally believed that individuals who were unfaithful to the United States government should face restrictions. Throughout her life in Hollywood, she maintained close friendships with prominent conservative luminaries, including Ronald and Nancy Reagan, James Stewart, John Wayne, Charlton Heston, Ward Bond, Walter Brennan, June Allyson, Yvonne De Carlo, Laraine Day, Dean Jagger, Cesar Romero, John Payne, Gloria DeHaven, Gale Storm, Coleen Gray, Virginia Mayo, Joan Caulfield, and Audrey Totter.

== Death ==
Windsor died of congestive heart failure on December 10, 2000, one day before her 81st birthday. She is interred with Hupp in her native Marysvale, Utah, at Mountain View Cemetery.

== Filmography ==
- Unexpected Uncle (1941) as Passerby on Sidewalk (uncredited)
- Week-End for Three (1941) as Extra (uncredited)
- All-American Co-Ed (1941) as Carrot Queen (uncredited)
- Playmates (1941) as Nightclub Patron (uncredited)
- Joan of Paris (1942) as French Girl in Cafe (uncredited)
- Four Jacks and a Jill (1942) as Girl Applying Makeup (uncredited)
- Call Out the Marines (1942) as Pretty Brunette on Tour (uncredited)
- The Lady or the Tiger? (1942) as The Princess (uncredited)
- Flying with Music (1942) as Native Girl (uncredited)
- Parachute Nurse (1942) as Company 'C' Girl (uncredited)
- Smart Alecks (1942) as Nurse
- The Big Street (1942) as Florida Nightclub Patron (uncredited)
- Eyes in the Night (1942) as Actress at Rehearsal (uncredited)
- George Washington Slept Here (1942) as Woman at Train Station (uncredited)
- Chatterbox (1943) as Hostess (uncredited)
- Three Hearts for Julia (1943) as Violinist (uncredited)
- Pilot No. 5 (1943) as Mrs. Claven (uncredited)
- Let's Face It (1943) as Chorus Girl (uncredited)
- The Iron Major (1943) as Young Woman at Dock (uncredited)
- Follow the Leader (1944) as Native Girl in Dream (uncredited)
- I Love My Wife, But! (1947) as Saleswoman (uncredited)
- Living in a Big Way (1947) as Jane, Junior League Girl (uncredited)
- The Hucksters (1947) as Girl on Train (uncredited)
- The Romance of Rosy Ridge (1947) as Baggett Daughter (uncredited)
- Song of the Thin Man (1947) as Helen Amboy
- The Unfinished Dance (1947) as Saleslady (uncredited)
- On an Island with You (1948) as Jane (uncredited)
- The Pirate (1948) as Madame Lucia (uncredited)
- The Three Musketeers (1948) as Lady-in-Waiting (uncredited)
- Force of Evil (1948) as Edna Tucker
- Outpost in Morocco (1949) as Cara
- The Beautiful Blonde from Bashful Bend (1949) as LaBelle Bergere (uncredited)
- Hellfire (1949) as Mary Carson / Doll Brown
- The Fighting Kentuckian (1949) as Ann Logan
- Dakota Lil (1950) as Dakota Lil
- The Showdown (1950) as Adelaide
- Double Deal (1950) as Terry Miller
- Frenchie (1950) as Diane Gorman
- Little Big Horn (1951) as Celie Donlin
- Hurricane Island (1951) as Jan Bolton
- Two Dollar Bettor (1951) as Mary Slate
- Japanese War Bride (1952) as Fran Sterling
- The Sniper (1952) as Jean Darr
- The Narrow Margin (1952) as Mrs. Frankie Neall
- Outlaw Women (1952) as Iron Mae McLeod
- The Jungle (1952) as Princess Mari
- The Tall Texan (1953) as Laura Thompson
- Trouble Along the Way (1953) as Anne Williams McCormick
- City That Never Sleeps (1953) as Lydia Biddel
- So This Is Love (1953) as Marilyn Montgomery
- Cat-Women of the Moon (1953) as Helen Salinger
- The Eddie Cantor Story (1953) as Cleo Abbott
- Hell's Half Acre (1954) as Rose
- The Bounty Hunter (1954) as Alice Williams
- The Silver Star (1955) as Karen Childress
- Abbott and Costello Meet the Mummy (1955) as Madame Rontru
- No Man's Woman (1955) as Carolyn Ellenson Grant
- Two-Gun Lady (1955) as Bess
- Swamp Women (1956) as Josie Nardo
- The Killing (1956) as Sherry Peatty
- Cheyenne (1957) as Thora Flagg
- The Unholy Wife (1957) as Gwen
- The Parson and the Outlaw (1957) as Tonya
- The Girl in Black Stockings (1957) as Julia Parry
- The Story of Mankind (1957) as Josephine Bonaparte
- Day of the Badman (1958) as Cora Johnson
- Island Women (1958) as Elizabeth
- Paradise Alley (1962) as Linda Belita
- This Is Not a Test (1962) as Mrs. Karen Barnes (under pseudonym Carol Kent)
- The Day Mars Invaded Earth (1963) as Claire Fielding
- Critic's Choice (1963) as Sally Orr
- Mail Order Bride (1964) as Hanna
- Bedtime Story (1964) as Mrs. Sutton
- Chamber of Horrors (1966) as Madame Corona
- The Good Guys and the Bad Guys (1969) as Polly
- One More Train to Rob (1971) as Louella
- Support Your Local Gunfighter (1971) as Goldie
- Cahill U.S. Marshal (1973) as Mrs. Green
- The Outfit (1973) as Madge Coyle
- Hearts of the West (1975) as Woman in Nevada
- Freaky Friday (1976) as Mrs. Murphy
- Salem's Lot (1979) as Eva Miller
- Lovely But Deadly (1981) as Aunt May
- Commando Squad (1987) as Casey

== Television ==
- The Pepsi-Cola Playhouse in the episode "Live a Little" (1954)
- Public Defender as Melody Scanlon in "The Ring" (1954)
- Stories of the Century as Belle Starr in the series premiere episode (1954)
- Waterfront as Marie Turner in the episode "Night at the Lighthouse" (1954)
- Science Fiction Theater as Nell Brown in the episode "Time is Just a Place" (1955)
- Cheyenne as Leda Brandt in "Decision at Gunsight" and as Thora Flagg in "The Mutton Puncher" (both 1957)
- The Californians as Dolly Dawson in "The Regulators" (1957)
- Maverick in the episodes "The Quick and the Dead" (1957) with James Garner and "Epitaph for a Gambler" (1962) with Jack Kelly
- Bat Masterson as saloon owner Polly Landers in "The Fighter" (1958)
- Perry Mason in four episodes:
  - as Linda Griffith in "The Case of the Daring Decoy" (1958)
  - as Flavia Pierce in "The Case of the Madcap Modiste" (1960)
  - as Edith "Edie" Morrow in "The Case of the Tarnished Trademark" (1962)
  - as Mrs. Helen Reed in "The Case of the Wednesday Woman" (1964)
- Yancy Derringer in episode 03, "Ticket to Natchez" (1958)
- Rawhide in three episodes:
  - "Incident on the Edge of Madness" (1959)
  - S3:E26, "Incident of the Painted Lady" (1961) as Miss Katie
  - "Incident of the Rusty Shotgun" (1964) as Amie Claybank
- The Alaskans as Maria Julien in the episode "Winter Song" (1959)
- Tales of Wells Fargo as Dolly Staples in the episode "The Warrior's Return" (1959)
- Bourbon Street Beat as Veda Troup in "The 10% Blues" and Mara in "Teresa" (both 1960)
- The Rebel as Emma Longdon in "Glory" (1960)
- Lassie as Mimi in "Little Cabbage" (1960)
- 77 Sunset Strip as Countess Maruska in "Collector's Item" (1960)
- New Comedy Showcase as Angela Talbot in "Johnny Come Lately" (1960)
- Hawaiian Eye in four episodes:
  - "The Comics" (1961)
  - "The Final Score" (1961)
  - "Location Shooting" (1962)
  - "Day in the Sun" (1962)
- Bonanza as Elizabeth Lassiter in the episode "Five Sundowns to Sunup" (1965)
- Batman in the episodes "Green Ice" and "Deep Freeze" (1966)
- Mannix in the episodes "The Need of a Friend" (1968) and "Walk a Double Line" (1974)
- Wild Women (1970) (TV)
- Adam-12, in the episodes "Log 56: Vice Versa" (1971), "The Chaser" (1972) and "Hollywood Division" (1973)
- Gunsmoke in the episode "Trafton" (1971)
- Alias Smith and Jones as Helen Archer in the episode "High Lonesome Country" (1971) (TV)
- Manhunter (1974)
- Police Story in the episode "Explosion" (1974)
- Marcus Welby, M.D. in the episode "The Highest Mountain" (1976)
- Charlie's Angels in the episodes "Angels in Springtime" (1978) and "Angels at the Altar" (1979)
- Salem's Lot (1979)
- Lou Grant (two episodes, 1979 and 1980)
- The Incredible Hulk as Belle Star in the episode "Sideshow" (1980)
- The Perfect Woman (1981)
- Simon & Simon in three episodes:
  - "Murder Between the Lines" (1983)
  - "The Dark Side of the Street" (1984)
  - "For Old Crime's Sake" (1987)
- J.O.E. and the Colonel (1985)
- Tales from the Darkside as Madam Angler in the episode "A New Lease on Life" (1986)
- Commando Squad (1987)
- Supercarrier (1988)
- The New Adam-12 (1990)
- Murder, She Wrote (two episodes, 1987 and 1991)
