= Burt Mustin =

American actor (1884–1977)

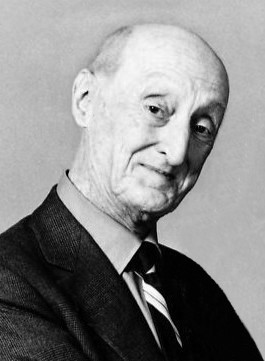
- Mustin in The Funny Side (1971)
- Born: Burton Hill Mustin; February 8, 1884; Pittsburgh, Pennsylvania, U.S.
- Died: January 28, 1977 (aged 92); Glendale, California, U.S.
- Resting place: Forest Lawn Memorial Park, Hollywood Hills, California
- Other name: Bert Mustin
- Education: Pennsylvania Military College
- Occupation: Actor
- Years active: 1921–1977
- Spouse: Frances Robina Woods Mustin (m. 1915; died 1969)

Burton Hill Mustin (February 8, 1884 – January 28, 1977) was an American character actor who appeared in over 150 film and television productions. He also worked in radio and appeared on the stage.

Mustin began his professional acting career at the age of 67 when he appeared in The Last Outpost, released in April 1951, and then director William Wyler cast him in the film noir Detective Story, released in November 1951. Known for his dependability and versatility, Mustin established a career as a well-known character actor and worked extensively in film and television from the 1950s to the 1970s. His last major role was as Arthur Lanson on the CBS sitcom Phyllis, appearing on the show until shortly before his death in early 1977 at the age of 92.

== Early life ==
Mustin was born in Pittsburgh to William I. and Sadie (Dorrington) Mustin. His father was a stockbroker. Mustin graduated from Pennsylvania Military College with a degree in civil engineering in 1903. He played first trombone in the band and also played goaltender for the school's ice hockey team in 1902. He was the last surviving member of his 1903 class. He worked as an engineer but later decided to enter sales. In 1916, Mustin began working as a car salesman selling Oakland Sensible Sixes, and he later sold luxury air-cooled Franklins. After the Franklin company quit selling automobiles in 1934, Mustin sold Mercurys and Lincolns until civilian car production was halted in 1942, during World War II. He then worked as a fiscal agent for the Better Business Bureau and the local chamber of commerce.

Before he began a professional career in show business, Mustin acted as an amateur. In 1921, he became the first announcer for a variety-show broadcast on Pittsburgh's new KDKA radio station. He appeared in productions as a member of the Pittsburgh Savoyards (a Gilbert and Sullivan troupe) and the Pittsburgh Opera. He was also a member of the Barbershop Harmony Society, making his first trip to California in 1925 for a quartet competition in San Francisco.

After retiring, Mustin moved to Tucson, Arizona. Director William Wyler saw him there in a stage production of Detective Story at the Sombrero Playhouse. Wyler told Mustin to contact him if he decided to pursue a screen career. Mustin contacted Wyler, who cast him in the 1951 film version of Detective Story. Soon after, he found steady work in films and television series. He later moved to Los Angeles.

== Career ==
=== Television ===
==== 1950s and 1960s ====
Mustin made his television debut in 1951 with a role in the Western series The Adventures of Kit Carson. In 1953, he played a cotton farmer in A Lion Is in the Streets, starring James Cagney. Almost from the start to the end of his career, Mustin specialized in playing older men, and with his tall scarecrow frame, bald head and beaked nose, he became one of the most familiar and busiest elderly character actors. Throughout the 1950s, he made guest appearances on The Abbott and Costello Show, Cavalcade of America, Dragnet, Fireside Theater, The Gale Storm Show, General Electric Theater, It's a Great Life, The Lone Ranger, The Loretta Young Show, Lux Video Theatre, Mackenzie's Raiders, Our Miss Brooks, Peter Gunn, The Public Defender, Studio 57, Tales of the Texas Rangers, The Texan, and Treasury Men in Action, among many others. Mustin also starred in the television series pilot episode of The Lone Wolf, starring Louis Hayward, in 1954.

Mustin guest starred on two episodes of The Twilight Zone: "The Night of the Meek", alongside Art Carney (1960), and "Kick the Can" (1962). In 1964, he had an uncredited role in The Outer Limits episode "The Guests".

During the 1960s, Mustin made one or more appearances on The Alfred Hitchcock Hour, Batman (episode 48), Ben Casey, The Beverly Hillbillies, Bewitched, Bonanza, Cimarron Strip, The Dick Van Dyke Show, Dr. Kildare, Dragnet, Get Smart, Gunsmoke, Ichabod and Me, The Jack Benny Program, The Many Loves of Dobie Gillis, The Monkees, My Three Sons, The New Phil Silvers Show, and The Virginian. In 1969, he co-starred in the television film The Over-the-Hill Gang, and appeared in the sequel film The Over-the-Hill Gang Rides Again the following year.

In addition to guest-starring roles, Mustin also had recurring roles on several television shows during the 1950s and 1960s. In 1955, he played the role of "Foley" in The Great Gildersleeve. From 1957 to 1958, he appeared as Mr. Finley on Date with the Angels. In 1957, he made his first appearance as "Gus the Fireman" in the first episode of Leave It to Beaver; he would continue in the role until 1962, making a total of 15 appearances on the show. In 1960, he made his first guest appearance on The Andy Griffith Show as Judd Fletcher. He appeared in the role until 1966; however in Season 6, Episode 17 (Return of Barney Fife), he is referred to as "ole man Crowley". He also portrayed "Old Uncle Joe" on two episodes of The Lucy Show in 1967. The following year, Mustin guest starred as "Grandpa Jenson" in three episodes of Petticoat Junction.

==== 1970s ====
During the 1970s, Mustin had guest roles on Adam-12, Emergency! Love, American Style, The Mary Tyler Moore Show, and Sanford and Son (episode "Home Sweet Home for the Aged").

With his quick wit and song-and-dance abilities, Mustin was a frequent guest on The Tonight Show Starring Johnny Carson during the 1970s. From 1971 to 1976, he appeared in five episodes of All in the Family (his first appearance as a night watchman, and an additional four appearances in a recurring role as "Justin Quigley").

In 1971, Mustin co-starred in the sketch comedy show The Funny Side. Hosted by Gene Kelly, the series featured an ensemble cast of five married couples that dealt with various issues through comedy sketches and song-and-dance routines. Mustin was cast opposite Queenie Smith as "the elderly couple". The series debuted on NBC in September 1971 and was canceled in January 1972. Mustin and Smith reprised their roles as "the elderly couple" on a 1972 episode of Rowan & Martin's Laugh-In.

Mustin guest starred as Jethroe Collins, the son of a victim of Jesse James, who dissuaded Bobby's idolization of the outlaw, in the "Bobby's Hero" episode of The Brady Bunch during the 1972–1973 season.

The next year, Mustin costarred in the television film version of Miracle on 34th Street, starring Sebastian Cabot, and had an uncredited role in the Disney television film Now You See Him, Now You Don't. His last continuing role was on the television series Phyllis; he played the suitor, and later husband, of Sally "Mother" Dexter, a role he played until shortly before his death.

=== Films ===
In addition to his extensive work in television, Mustin appeared in numerous films. His uncredited April 1951 film debut at age 67 in The Last Outpost was followed by a part in Detective Story seven months later. He then had roles in Talk About a Stranger (1952), The Sellout (1952; first credited), The Silver Whip (1953), Half a Hero (1953), She Couldn't Say No (1954), The Desperate Hours (1955), Man with the Gun (1955), Storm Center (1956), and The Sheepman (1958).

In the 1960s and 1970s, Mustin appeared in The Adventures of Huckleberry Finn (1960), Hemingway's Adventures of a Young Man (1962), Twilight of Honor (1963), What a Way to Go! (1964), The Misadventures of Merlin Jones (1964), Sex and the Single Girl (1964), The Cincinnati Kid (1965), Cat Ballou (1965) (uncredited as a former gunfighter "Old ... Old ... ?" ), The Ghost and Mr. Chicken (1965), The Adventures of Bullwhip Griffin (1967), Speedway (uncredited) (1968), The Shakiest Gun in the West (1968), The Great Bank Robbery (1969), Hail, Hero! (1969), and Skin Game (1971). In 1974, Mustin portrayed "Uncle Jeff" in the musical film Mame, starring Lucille Ball and Bea Arthur. He also had a small role in Herbie Rides Again, also released in 1974. The next year, he appeared as "Regent Appleby" in The Strongest Man in the World. His final film role came in 1976 in the Western film Baker's Hawk, starring Clint Walker and Burl Ives.

=== Tribute ===
In 2000 TV Land created a series of commercials celebrating the often-seen but little-known-by-name character actors who regularly appeared in their shows, with Mustin being featured in one.

== Personal life ==
Mustin was one of the 110 original founders of the Pittsburgh chapter of the Lions Club, which was established in 1921. He served as one of the presidents and remained active in the club for the remainder of his life.

He married Frances Robina Woods in 1915. The couple remained together for 54 years, until her death in 1969. They had no children.

== Death ==
On January 28, 1977, Mustin died at Glendale Memorial Hospital in Glendale, California, at the age of 92. Funeral services were held at Forest Lawn Memorial Park in Hollywood Hills, California.

== Filmography ==
Film
Year	Title	Role	Notes
1951	The Last Outpost	Marshal of San Gil	Uncredited
1951	Detective Story	Willie	Uncredited
1952	Talk About a Stranger	Mr. McEley	Uncredited
1952	The Sellout	Elk M. Ludens	
1952	Just Across the Street	Ed Simmons	
1952	The Lusty Men	Jeremiah Watrus	
1952	She Couldn't Say No	Amos	Uncredited
1953	The Silver Whip	Uncle Ben Nunan	Uncredited
1953	One Girl's Confession	Gardener	
1953	Half a Hero	Granddad Radwell	Uncredited
1953	Vicki	Hotel Bellboy	Uncredited
1953	The Moonlighter	Turnkey	Uncredited
1953	A Lion Is in the Streets	Swift	Uncredited
1954	Executive Suite	Sam Teal	Uncredited
1954	Gypsy Colt	Charlie	Uncredited
1954	Witness to Murder	Building Night Watchman at End	Uncredited
1954	Silver Lode	Spectator at Oration	Uncredited
1954	Cattle Queen of Montana	Dan	
1954	Day of Triumph	Man in the City	Uncredited
1955	Prince of Players	Miner	Uncredited
1955	The Desperate Hours	Carl	Uncredited
1955	The Return of Jack Slade	Gunsmith	Uncredited
1955	Man with the Gun	Hotel Desk Clerk	Uncredited
1956	Great Day in the Morning	Doctor	Uncredited
1956	Storm Center	Carl	Uncredited
1956	Edge of Hell	Mr. Morrison	
1956	These Wilder Years	Old Man	Uncredited
1957	Raintree County	Old gent with "Flash"	Uncredited
1958	The Sheepman	Man on Stairs	Uncredited
1958	Rally Round the Flag, Boys!	Milton Evans, Town Meeting Chairman	Uncredited
1959	The FBI Story	Uncle Fudd Schneider	Uncredited
1960	Home from the Hill	Gas station attendant	Uncredited
1961	The Adventures of Huckleberry Finn	Old Farmer with Shotgun	Uncredited
1961	Snow White and the Three Stooges	Farmer	Uncredited
1962	All Fall Down	Second Tramp	Uncredited
1962	Hemingway's Adventures of a Young Man	Old Soldier	Uncredited
1963	Son of Flubber	Bailiff	Uncredited
1963	The Thrill of It All	The Fraleigh butler	
1963	Twilight of Honor	Court Clerk	Uncredited
1964	The Misadventures of Merlin Jones	Bailiff	Uncredited
1964	What a Way to Go!	Crawleyville Lawyer	Uncredited
1964	The Killers	Elderly Man	
1964	Sex and the Single Girl	Harvey	Uncredited
1965	Cat Ballou	Accuser	
1965	The Cincinnati Kid	Old Man in Pool Hall	Uncredited
1966	The Ghost and Mr. Chicken	Mr. Deligondo	Uncredited
1967	The Adventures of Bullwhip Griffin	Townsman	Uncredited
1967	The Reluctant Astronaut	Ned	Uncredited
1968	Speedway	Janitor at Coffee Shop	Uncredited
1968	The Shakiest Gun in the West	Old Artimus	Uncredited
1969	The Witchmaker	Boatman	
1969	My Dog, the Thief	Man eating a sandwich	
1969	The Great Bank Robbery	Glazier	Uncredited
1969	Hail, Hero!	Old Man #2	
1969	A Time for Dying	Ed	
1970	Tiger by the Tail	Tom Dugger	
1971	Skin Game	Liveryman in Fair Shake	Uncredited
1972	Now You See Him, Now You Don't	Mr. Reed	Uncredited
1974	Herbie Rides Again	Rich Man in Mansion	
1974	Mame	Uncle Jeff	
1975	The Strongest Man in the World	Regent Appleby	
1975	Train Ride to Hollywood	George	
1976	Baker's Hawk	General	(final film role)

Television
Year	Title	Role	Notes
1951	The Adventures of Kit Carson	Dave Lowery	Episode: "Fury at Red Gulch"
1953	The Stu Erwin Show	Uncle Lucious Erwin	Episode: "In the Shade of the Old Family Tree"
1954	Father Knows Best	Old Eddie Gilbert	Episode: "Grandpa Jim's Rejuvenation"
1955	The Adventures of Rin Tin Tin	Jameson Penrose	Episode: "The Legacy of Sean O'Hara"
1956	Science Fiction Theatre	Mr. Stevenson	Episode: "Brain Unlimited"
1957	State Trooper	John Daka	Episode: "Room Service for 321"
1957–1958	Date with the Angels	Mr. Finley	5 episodes
1957–1962	Leave It to Beaver	Gus the Fireman	15 episodes
1958	Maverick	Henry	Episode: "The Day They Hanged Bret Maverick"
1958	The Restless Gun	Man Playing Checkers	Episode: "A Pressing Engagement"
1959	Cimarron City		Episode 1, Season 1
1959	Peter Gunn	Cab driver	Episode: "The Rifle"
1959	Tombstone Territory	Lucky Jack Oliver	Episode: "The Black Diamond"
1960	General Electric Theater	Burt	Episode: "Adam's Apples"
1960	The Many Loves of Dobie Gillis	Jethro R. Wiggins J.P.	Episode: "Here Comes the Groom"
1960	The Dennis O'Keefe Show	Grandpa Clayhipple	Episode: "June Thursday"
1960	Mr. Lucky	Uncle Billy	Episode: "The Leadville Kid Gang"
1960	The Twilight Zone	Bert	Episode: "Night of the Meek"
1961	Alfred Hitchcock Presents	Old Man playing darts	Season 6 Episode 19: "The Landlady"
1961	Thriller	The Redcap	Episode: "A Third for Pinochle"
1961	My Three Sons	Max	1 episode
1961	Peter Gunn	Old Man	Episode: "Down the Drain"
1961–1962	Ichabod and Me	Olaf	4 episodes
1961–1966	Bonanza	Various characters	4 episodes
1961–1966	The Andy Griffith Show	Jud Fletcher	14 episodes
1962	Shannon	Mr. Munday	Episode: "The Medal"
1962	The Twilight Zone	Old Man in Rest Home	Episode: "Kick the Can"
1963	The Alfred Hitchcock Hour	Jury Foreman (uncredited)	Season 1 Episode 24: "The Star Juror"
1963	The Alfred Hitchcock Hour	Mr. Bell	Season 2 Episode 6: "Nothing Ever Happens in Linvale"
1963	The Dick Van Dyke Show	Mr. Donald Lucas Parker	Episode: " Very Old Shoes, Very Old Rice"
1963–1964	The New Phil Silvers Show	Magruder	Episodes: "Who Do Voodoo? Harry Do!" and "Moonlight and Dozes"
1964	The Fugitive	Charley	Episode: "Nicest Fella You'd Ever Want to Meet"
1965	Hank	Pete	Episode: "Candidate"
1965	Get Smart	Agent 8	Episode: "Dear Diary"
1966	Batman	Old MacDonald	Episode 48: "The Yegg Foes in Gotham"
1966	Bewitched	Various characters	3 episodes
1967	Dragnet	Fred Gregory	Episode : "The Bank Examiner Swindle"
1967	The Monkees	Kimba	S2:E8, "Monkees Marooned"
1967	The Monkees	Butler	S2:E15, "The Christmas Show"
1967	The Girl from U.N.C.L.E.	Jan Streich	Episode: "The Moulin Ruse Affair"
1968	Gomer Pyle, U.S.M.C.	Mr. Ferguson	Episode: "Gomer Goes Home"
1968	Gunsmoke	Uncle Finney	Episode: "Uncle Finney"
1968	Dragnet	Charles Augustus William Smith	Episode: "The Senior Citizen"
1969	The Good Guys	Kiley	Episode: "A Chimp Named Sam"
1969	Dragnet	Calvin Lampe	Episode: "Homicide: DR 22"
1970	The Ghost & Mrs. Muir	Mr. Homer	Episode: "Pardon My Ghost"
1970–1974	Adam-12	Various characters	5 episodes
1971	The Mary Tyler Moore Show	The Old Man	Episode: "Second Story Story"
1971	The New Andy Griffith Show	Mr. Ormstead	Episode: "Glen Campbell Visits"
1971	All in the Family	Harry Feeney	Episode: "Archie Is Worried About His Job"
1971	Rowan and Martin's Laugh-In	Himself + various characters	Season 5, Episode 13
1973	Here's Lucy	Mr. Robertson	Episode: "Lucy and Joan Rivers Do Jury Duty"
1973	The Brady Bunch	Jethroe Collins	Episode: "Bobby's Hero"
1973	Sanford and Son	Mr. Malloy	Episode: "Home Sweet Home for the Aged"
1973–1976	All in the Family	Justin Quigley	4 episodes
1974	Rhoda	Sleeping Man	Episode: "The Honeymoon"
1974–1976	The Tonight Show Starring Johnny Carson	Himself	13 episodes
1975	Emergency!	Various characters	2 episodes
1975	Switch	Old man	Episode: "The Deadly Missiles Caper"
1976	The Moneychangers	Jack Henderson	Miniseries
1976–1977	Phyllis	Arthur Lanson	4 episodes
