= Okinawa (film) =

1952 film by Leigh Jason

- Directed by: Leigh Jason
- Written by: Arthur A. Ross
- Screenplay by: Jameson Brewer; Leonard Stern
- Produced by: Wallace MacDonald
- Starring: Pat O'Brien; Cameron Mitchell; Richard Denning
- Cinematography: Henry Freulich
- Edited by: Jerome Thoms
- Production company: Columbia Pictures
- Distributed by: Columbia Pictures
- Release date: February 28, 1952
- Running time: 67 minutes
- Country: United States
- Language: English

Okinawa is a 1952 American war film directed by Leigh Jason and starring Pat O'Brien, Cameron Mitchell and Richard Denning. It was produced and distributed by Columbia Pictures as a second feature.

== Plot ==
Captain Hale commands a U.S. Navy destroyer taking part in the Battle of Okinawa and the kamikaze attacks.

== Cast ==
- Pat O'Brien as Lt. Cmdr. Hale
- Cameron Mitchell as 'Grip' McCleary
- Richard Denning as Lt. Phillips
- Rhys Williams as Robby Roberg
- James Dobson as Emerson
- Richard Benedict as Delgado
- Rudy Robles as Felix
- Norman Budd as Smith
- Don Gibson as Lt. Sanders
- George A. Cooper as Yeoman

== Reception ==
A contemporary review noted that "unfortunately [the film] carried as a cargo an overload of dialogue."
