= The Over-the-Hill Gang =

1969 American made-for-television Western comedy television film by Jean Yarbrough

- DVD cover
- Written by: Jameson Brewer; Leonard Goldberg
- Directed by: Jean Yarbrough
- Starring: Walter Brennan; Pat O'Brien; Chill Wills; Edgar Buchanan; Gypsy Rose Lee; Andy Devine; Jack Elam
- Music by: Hugo Friedhofer
- Country of origin: United States
- Original language: English

Production
- Cinematography: Henry Cronjager Jr.
- Editor: Joseph Gluck
- Running time: 75 min.
- Production company: Thomas-Spelling Productions

Original release
- Network: ABC
- Release: October 7, 1969

Related
- The Over-the-Hill Gang Rides Again; Once Upon a Texas Train

The Over-the-Hill Gang is a 1969 American made-for-television Western comedy film about a group of aging Texas Rangers, starring Walter Brennan and Pat O'Brien. Chill Wills, Edgar Buchanan, Andy Devine, and Jack Elam play supporting roles. The film was written by Richard Carr and directed by Jean Yarbrough. The film premiered on ABC on October 7, 1969.

== Description ==
The plot concerns a young newspaper editor who is conducting a campaign to unseat the town's "tinhorn" mayor. The mayor is backed by a "gun-happy sheriff" and a "whiskey-soaked judge". The editor's campaign receives a boost when he is joined by a former Texas Ranger and "three of the fightin'-est straight shooters around."

The movie premiered on October 7, 1969, as the ABC Movie of the Week. It was one of the first films of that series. It was ABC's top-rated program of the week - the first time that status had been achieved by a film made expressly for television.

A sequel called The Over-the-Hill Gang Rides Again was produced the following year, with Brennan, Wills, Buchanan, Devine, and Burt Mustin reprising their roles, while Fred Astaire replaced O'Brien as the second lead. Both movies doubled as a pilot for a projected weekly TV series, but ABC ultimately passed on the idea.

In 1971, George Allen became the head coach of the Washington Redskins, and he began to acquire many veteran players to bolster the team's depleted roster. In reference to this movie, the Redskins were nicknamed "The Over-the-Hill Gang".

== Cast ==
- Walter Brennan as Nash Crawford
- Pat O'Brien as Captain Oren Hayes
- Chill Wills as Gentleman George Asque
- Edgar Buchanan as Jason Fitch
- Gypsy Rose Lee as Cassie
- Andy Devine as Judge Amos Polk
- Jack Elam as Sheriff Clyde Barnes
- Edward Andrews as Mayor Nard Lundy
- Ricky Nelson as Jeff Rose
- Kristen Nelson as Hannah Rose
- William Smith as Amos
- Myron Healey as Deputy Tucker
- Rex Holman as Deputy Dolby
- Bruce Glover as Deputy
- Allen Pinson as Deputy Steel
- Burt Mustin as Old Man
- Almira Sessions as Mrs. Fletcher
- Robert Karnes as Sheriff
- Dennis Cross as Sheriff
- William 'Billy' Benedict as Joe (telegrapher)
- Harlen Carraher as Nash Crawford's grandson
- Larry Michaels as Nash Crawford's grandson

== Remake ==
The main characters appeared nearly 20 years later in 1988 in writer/director Burt Kennedy's Once Upon a Texas Train, with famous Western stars portraying them. Richard Widmark co-stars as Captain Oren Hayes (replacing Pat O'Brien), Chuck Connors as Nash Crawford (originally Walter Brennan's role), Jack Elam as Jason Fitch (initially portrayed by Edgar Buchanan) and Stuart Whitman as Gentleman George Asque (Chill Wills' part). Elam had the distinction of moving from being one of the bad guys in the original to becoming one of the good guys in the quasiremake, which centers around the former Texas Rangers trying to capture an "over-the-hill" outlaw gang led by Willie Nelson.
