= Richard Benedict =

Italian-American actor, director (1920–1984)

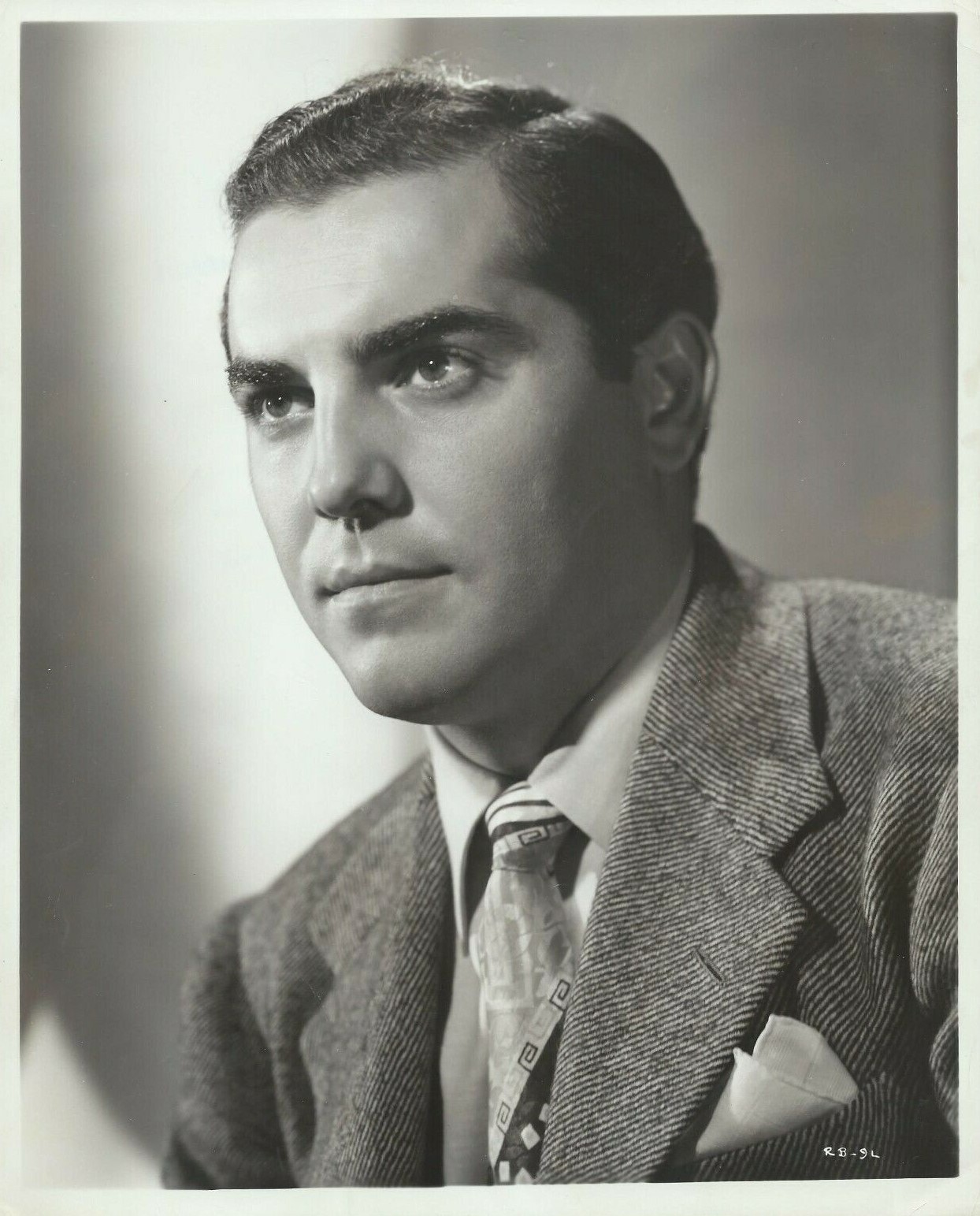
- Benedict in the 1940s
- Born: Riccardo Benedetto; January 8, 1920; Palermo, Italy
- Died: April 29, 1984 (aged 64); Los Angeles, California, U.S.
- Resting place: Forest Lawn Memorial Park, Hollywood Hills, California, U.S.
- Occupations: Actor; director; writer
- Years active: 1944–1984
- Spouse: Paula Lindenbaum
- Children: 3, including Nick Benedict

Richard "Pepe" Benedict (born Riccardo Benedetto; January 8, 1920 – April 29, 1984) was an Italian-American television and film actor and director. He was born in Palermo, Italy.

== Career ==
He appeared in dozens of television programs and movies from the 1940s to the 1960s, most notably Ace in the Hole (1951), directed by Billy Wilder. Benedict appeared with Frank Sinatra and the Rat Pack in the 1960 movie Ocean's 11 as one of the 11 men who rob five Las Vegas casinos on the same night. He also played the commander of the Mars rescue ship in the 1958 B sci-fi movie It! The Terror from Beyond Space.

Benedict's television appearances included Adventures of Superman, The Lone Ranger, Perry Mason, Zorro, Dragnet, Peter Gunn and Hawaii Five-O. His directing credits included Impasse, an adventure film starring Burt Reynolds.

== Death ==
He died of a heart attack at Studio City, Los Angeles, on April 29, 1984, and was interred in Forest Lawn – Hollywood Hills Cemetery, in the Churchyard section. He was the father of three children, including actor Nick Benedict.

== Filmography ==
Year	Title	Role	Notes
1944	Winged Victory	Drunken Seaman	Uncredited
1945	See My Lawyer	Joe Wilson	
1945	A Walk in the Sun	Private Tranella	
1946	O.S.S.	Bernay	
1946	Somewhere in the Night	Marine Desk Sergeant	Uncredited
1946	Till the End of Time	The Boy From Idaho	
1946	Blue Skies	Shirtless Soldier at White Christmas Camp Show	Uncredited
1947	Backlash	Detective Sergeant Tom Carey	
1947	The Guilt of Janet Ames	Joe Burton	
1947	Seven Were Saved	Sergeant	Uncredited
1947	Crossfire	Bill	
1948	The Arizona Ranger	Ranger Gills	
1948	Race Street	Sam	
1948	Smart Girls Don't Talk	Cliff Saunders	
1949	Shockproof	"Kid", Knife Wielder	Uncredited
1949	Homicide	Nick Foster	
1949	City Across the River	Gaggsy Steens	
1949	Streets of San Francisco	Henry Walker	
1949	The Window	Drunken Seaman	Uncredited
1949	Omoo-Omoo, the Shark God	Mate Richards	
1949	Scene of the Crime	Turk Kingby	
1949	Post Office Investigator	Louis Reese	
1949	Angels in Disguise	Miami	
1950	Destination Big House	Joe Bruno	
1950	State Penitentiary	Mike Gavin	
1950	Triple Trouble	Skeets O'Neil	
1950	Rookie Fireman	Al Greco	
1951	Inside the Walls of Folsom Prison	Tom McCain	Uncredited
1951	Ace in the Hole	Leo Minosa	
1952	Okinawa	Delgado	
1952	Hoodlum Empire	Silky Tanner	
1952	Breakdown	Harry "Punchy" Adams	
1952	Woman in the Dark	Gino Morello	
1953	Jalopy	Tony Lango	
1953	The Juggler	Police Officer Kogan	
1953	Run for the Hills	"Happy" Day	
1953	Murder Without Tears	"Candy Markwell" Martola	
1953	Act of Love	Pete	
1955	The Big Tip Off	Hood #1	
1955	The Shrike	Gregory, Male Nurse	
1955	Spy Chasers	Boris	
1955	Wiretapper	Romato	
1956	He Laughed Last	Big Dan's Hood	Uncredited
1956	The Man Is Armed	Lew "Mitch" Mitchell	
1956	The Great Man	Cab Driver	Uncredited
1957	Spring Reunion	Jim	Uncredited
1957	Monkey on My Back	Art Winch	
1957	Beginning of the End	Corporal Mathias	
1957	The Midnight Story	Pool Player	Uncredited
1957	The Walter Winchell File	Keeger	Episode: The Decision
1958	Alfred Hitchcock Presents	Mike	Season 4 Episode 3: "The Jokester"
1958	It! The Terror from Beyond Space	Bob Finelli	
1960	I'll Give My Life	Corporal Burr	
1960	Ocean's 11	"Curly" Steffans	
1961	Ada	Alabama Man	Uncredited
1964	Mike and the Mermaid		
1965	A Swingin' Summer	Tom	
1965	Winter A-Go-Go		Director
1969	Impasse	Owner / Bartender of Ugly American	Uncredited
1972	Bloody Trail		
1983	Disconnected	Store Customer	(final film role)
