= The Adventures of Martin Eden =

1942 film

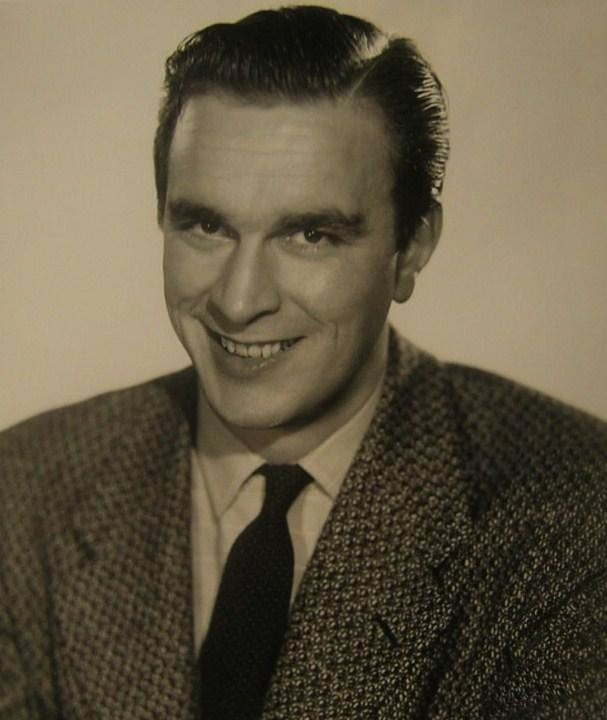
- Ian MacDonald in 'The Adventures of Martin Eden'
- Directed by: Sidney Salkow
- Written by: W. L. River; Jack London
- Produced by: B. P. Schulberg
- Starring: Glenn Ford; Claire Trevor
- Cinematography: Franz Planer
- Edited by: Al Clark
- Distributed by: Columbia Pictures
- Release date: February 22, 1942
- Running time: 87 minutes
- Country: United States
- Language: English
- Budget: $1 million

The Adventures of Martin Eden is a 1942 black-and-white adventure film directed by Sidney Salkow and starring Glenn Ford and Claire Trevor. It is based on Jack London's novel Martin Eden (1909).

== Plot ==
Martin Eden wants to be a writer but embarks as a sailor on a merchant ship. A storm hits the ship, which sinks. Martin escapes and decides to write about the experience.

== Cast ==
- Glenn Ford as Martin Eden
- Claire Trevor as Connie
- Stuart Erwin as Dawson
- Frank Conroy as Carl
- Evelyn Keyes as Ruth
- Ian MacDonald as Raglan
- Rafaela Ottiano as Maria
- Robert J. McDonald as Judge
- Uncredited actors include Filipino Hollywood actor Rudy Robles as San.
