= Silent Raiders =

1954 film by Richard Bartlett

- Original film poster
- Directed by: Richard Bartlett
- Written by: Richard Bartlett
- Produced by: Earle Lyon; Richard Bartlett
- Starring: Richard Bartlett; Earle Lyon; Jeanette Bordeaux
- Cinematography: Glen Gano
- Edited by: Al Walker
- Music by: Elmer Bernstein
- Production companies: L&B Productions
- Distributed by: Lippert Pictures
- Release date: September 17, 1954
- Running time: 65 minutes
- Country: United States
- Language: English

Silent Raiders is a 1954 low budget American war film directed, starring and co-produced by Richard Bartlett. It was the first film of the L&B Production Company, consisting of Earle Lyon and Richard Bartlett.

== Plot ==
Prior to the Dieppe Raid, seven US Army Rangers come ashore. Their mission is to destroy a German communications centre that controls the coastal guns that threaten the Canadian amphibious assault.

== Cast ==
- Richard Bartlett as Sgt. Jack
- Earle Lyon as Sgt. Malloy
- Jeanette Bordeaux as French Girl
- Earl Hansen as Pepe
- Robert Knapp asLt. Finch
- Dean Fredericks as Chief
- Frank Stanlow as Horse
- Carl Swanstrom as Wetzel

== Production ==
Produced for $27,000 with the working titles of Dieppe Raid and Three Miles to Dawn, it was filmed in Malibu, California in 1953.

The producers were able to use composer Elmer Bernstein who was relegated to minor studios during the Hollywood blacklist period.
