= Omoo-Omoo, the Shark God =

- Theatrical release poster
- Directed by: Leon Leonard
- Written by: George D. Green; Leon Leonard
- Based on: Omoo by Herman Melville
- Produced by: Leonard S. Picker
- Starring: Ron Randell; Devera Burton
- Cinematography: Benjamin H. Kline
- Edited by: Stanley Frazen
- Music by: Albert Glasser
- Production company: Esla Pictures
- Distributed by: Screen Guild Productions
- Release date: June 10, 1949
- Running time: 58 minutes
- Country: United States
- Language: English

Omoo-Omoo the Shark God is a 1949 American exploitation film directed by Leon Leonard. Loosely based on the Herman Melville novel Omoo, it is about the curses that befall a ship following the removal of pearls from an island shrine.

The film is also known as The Shark God in the United Kingdom.

== Plot ==
A sea captain has violated the tabu of a South Sea Island by removing some pearls that are the eyes of an idol of the Shark God. The captain is killed by two crew members who want the pearls.

== Cast ==
- Ron Randell as Jeff Garland
- Devera Burton as Julie Guy
- Trevor Bardette as Capt. Roger Guy
- Pedro de Cordoba as Chief Tari
- Richard Benedict as Mate Richards
- Michael Whalen as "Chips"
- Rudy Robles as Tembo
- George Meeker as Dr. Godfrey Long
- Lisa Kincaid as Tala

== Reception ==
Variety called it "an unpretentious jungle picture" in which the action sequences "seldom achieve an aura of realism" and "performances are generally listless with Randell turning in the most credible job."
