= Wally Cassell =

Italian-American actor (1912–2015)

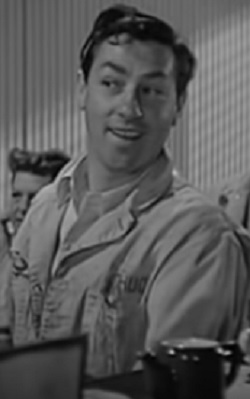
- Cassell in Quicksand (1950)
- Born: Oswaldo Silvestri Trippilini Rolando Vincenza Castellano; March 3, 1912; Agrigento, Sicily, Kingdom of Italy
- Died: April 2, 2015 (aged 103); Palm Desert, California, U.S.
- Occupations: Actor; businessman
- Years active: 1937–2006
- Spouse: Marcy McGuire (m. 1947)

Wally Cassell (March 3, 1912 – April 2, 2015) was an Italian-born American character actor and businessman.

== Early years ==
Wally Cassell was born as Oswaldo Silvestri Trippilini Rolando Vincenza Castellano. (A 1951 newspaper article gives Cassell's real name as Osvaldo Tripolini Ronaldo Vincennes Castelleno.) The son of Luigi and Luisa Castellano, Oswaldo was born in Agrigento, Sicily, and moved with his family to the United States when he was two years of age. (Another source says that his parents brought him to Brooklyn, New York, "when I was a babe in arms.") As a youngster, Cassell was a dancer, but he abandoned dancing to concentrate on acting.

== Film ==
Cassell began his film career in 1942, initially working in small, uncredited roles. Mickey Rooney, with whom Cassell appears in the 1950 film noir Quicksand, is credited with suggesting the change of name to Wally Cassell. Rooney is also credited with helping Cassell gain a screen test and a contract with Metro-Goldwyn-Mayer.

His film's credits, sometimes credited or uncredited, include The Thin Man Goes Home (1945), The Story of G.I. Joe (1945), The Clock (1945), The Postman Always Rings Twice (1946), The Guilty (1947), Loves of Carmen (1948), Saigon (1948), Sands of Iwo Jima (1949), White Heat (1949),Quicksand (1950), Highway 301 (1950), City That Never Sleeps (1953), Island in the Sky (1953), Law and Order (1953), Princess of the Nile (1954), Until They Sail (1957), and I, Madman (1989).

== Television ==
Cassell was later cast in two syndicated programs starring Jim Davis: Stories of the Century, in the role of gunman Luke Short, and Rescue 8, as Johnny French in "One More Step." Cassell also guest-starred in several television series, including The Loretta Young Show (1955), as "Oley" in James Arness's TV Western series Gunsmoke in the 1956 episode "Hack Prine" (S1E26), the 1959 premiere episode of The Untouchables ("The Empty Chair"), Rawhide (1960), and The Beverly Hillbillies (1963).

== Later years ==
Cassell retired from acting in 1964 and became a successful businessman.

== Personal life and death ==
Cassell was married to actress and singer Marcy McGuire from August 30, 1947, until his death. Cassell's daughter, Cindy Cassell, became an actress. At age 13, she had the role of Pony Hutchinson in the Walt Disney Studios film Emil and the Detectives (1964).

Cassell died at his home in Palm Desert, California in 2015 at age 103.

== Filmography ==
Year	Title	Role	Notes
1942	Fingers at the Window	Photographer	Uncredited
1942	Dr. Gillespie's New Assistant	Gangster	Uncredited
1942	Stand By for Action	Talker	Uncredited
1943	The Human Comedy	Man flirting	Uncredited
1943	Presenting Lily Mars	Man	Uncredited
1943	Pilot ♯5	Soldier	Uncredited
1943	Salute to the Marines	Marine corporal	Uncredited
1943	Thousands Cheer	Jack	Uncredited
1943	Swing Fever	Cassidy	Uncredited
1943	Maisie Goes to Reno	Reporter	Uncredited
1943	Thirty Seconds Over Tokyo	Sailor	Uncredited
1943	The Thin Man Goes Home	Bill Burns	Uncredited
1943	National Velvet	Jockey	Uncredited
1943	Music for Millions	Soldier	Uncredited
1945	Main Street After Dark	Jenkins	Uncredited
1945	The Clock	Soda jerk	Uncredited
1945	Son of Lassie	POW	Uncredited
1945	Dangerous Partners	Drumman Son	Uncredited
1945	Story of G.I. Joe	Private Dondaro	
1945	Anchors Aweigh	Sailor	Uncredited
1946	The Postman Always Rings Twice	Ben	
1946	Bad Bascomb	Curley	Uncredited
1946	Gallant Bess	Mike	Uncredited
1947	Ramrod	Virg Lea	
1947	The Guilty	Johnny Dixon	
1947	Killer McCoy	Louie - Gambler	Uncredited
1948	Summer Holiday	Salesman	Uncredited
1948	Saigon	Sgt. Pete Rocco	
1948	Homecoming	Patient	Uncredited
1948	The Loves of Carmen	Dragoon Stagecoach Passenger	Uncredited
1948	Joan of Arc	French Soldier Offering Amulet	Uncredited
1949	Streets of San Francisco	Den Driscoll	
1949	We Were Strangers	Miguel	
1949	Arctic Manhunt	Tooyuk	
1949	White Heat	Cotton Valletti	
1949	Sands of Iwo Jima	PFC Benny Regazzi	
1950	Quicksand	Chuck	
1950	Highway 301	Robert 'Bobby' Mais	
1951	Oh! Susanna	Trooper Muro	
1951	Little Big Horn	Pvt. Danny Zecca	
1951	The Wild Blue Yonder	Sgt. Pulaski	
1952	Sound Off	Tony Baccigalupi	
1952	Breakdown	Pete Sampson	
1952	One Minute to Zero	Pvt. Means	Uncredited
1952	Thunderbirds	Pfc. Sam Jacobs	
1953	Law and Order	Durango Kid	
1953	City That Never Sleeps	Gregg Warren	
1953	The Charge at Feather River	Member of Rescue Party	Uncredited
1953	Island in the Sky	D'Annunzia	
1954	Princess of the Nile	Goghi	
1955	Timberjack	Veazie	
1955	Paris Follies of 1956	Harry	
1956	The Come On	Tony	
1956	Wetbacks	Coast Guard lieutenant	
1956	Accused of Murder	Cipriano's Doorman	Uncredited
1957	Until They Sail	Phil Friskett aka Shiner	
1958	The Walter Winchell File	"David & Goliath" - Costa	
1960	The Rat Race	Hotel Clerk	Uncredited
