= Streets of San Francisco (film) =

1949 film by George Blair

- Theatrical release poster
- Directed by: George Blair
- Screenplay by: John K. Butler
- Story by: Gordon Kahn; Adele Buffington
- Produced by: Sidney Picker
- Starring: Robert Armstrong; Mae Clarke; Gary Gray; Wally Cassell; Richard Benedict; John Harmon
- Cinematography: John MacBurnie
- Edited by: Harry Keller
- Music by: Stanley Wilson
- Production company: Republic Pictures
- Distributed by: Republic Pictures
- Release date: April 15, 1949
- Running time: 60 minutes
- Country: United States
- Language: English

Streets of San Francisco is a 1949 American crime film directed by George Blair, written by John K. Butler and starring Robert Armstrong, Mae Clarke, Gary Gray, Wally Cassell, Richard Benedict and John Harmon. It was released on April 15, 1949 by Republic Pictures.

== Plot ==
Frankie Fraser finds out his father Luke has committed a theft netting $250,000. The boy is forced to go along with Fraser and his three accomplices, missing school. Lt. Will Logan of the police puts the pieces together and investigates.

In a confrontation, Will kills Fraser, but then is unable to get young Frankie to tell what he knows. The now homeless child is permitted to stay 10 days at the lieutenant's home, meeting Will's kind wife Hazel and father-in-law Pop, and comes to appreciate their kindness toward him. Will is eventually willing to adopt him.

A prying reporter, Nichols, causes trouble for Will, making it appear he's only sheltering the kid to make him inform. Fraser's partners in crime come to snatch the boy, shooting and wounding Pop in the process. At the train station where the stolen loot is stashed, Frankie manages to tip off a clerk to call the police. The gang is overcome with tear gas, after which Will takes the boy safely home.

== Cast ==
- Robert Armstrong as Willard Logan
- Mae Clarke as Hazel Logan
- Gary Gray as Frankie Fraser
- Wally Cassell as Den Driscoll
- Richard Benedict as Henry Walker
- John Harmon as Sammy Hess
- J. Farrell MacDonald as Pop Lockhart
- Ian MacDonald as Luke Fraser
- Charles Meredith as Eckert
- Eve March as Joyce Quinn
- Denver Pyle as Ed Quinn
- Charles Cane as John O'Halloran
- William "Bill" Henry as Nichols
- Claire Du Brey as Mrs. Partridge
- Martin Garralaga as Rocco
- Ross Elliott as Clevens
