= Rudy Robles =

Filipino actor

- Born: Pastor Lluviosa Robles; 29 April 1910; Tacloban, Philippine Islands
- Died: 11 August 1970 (aged 60); Manila, Philippines
- Other names: Ruby Robles
- Occupation: Actor
- Years active: 1939–1956

Rudy Robles (born Pastor Lluviosa Robles, 29 April 1910 – 11 August 1970) was a Filipino film and television actor. He was one of the first Filipino actors to appear in Hollywood movies.

== Career ==
Robles was born in the town of Tacloban, in the province of Leyte in the Philippines, where he began his schooling before emigrating to the United States. He completed high school and college in California, where he excelled in debating and acting. Producer Samuel Goldwyn reportedly discovered and gave him the screen name Rudy Robles whilst he was working as a bellhop at The Beverly Hills Hotel in Hollywood.

His credits include pre- and post-World War II films, such as Lt. Yabo in The Real Glory (1939) starring Gary Cooper and David Niven. His uncredited roles include appearances in The Adventures of Martin Eden (1942), Wake Island (1942), Manila Calling (1942), and he played a Filipino assassin in the 1942 film Across the Pacific.

During World War II, Robles entered the U.S. Army and served in Australia, New Guinea and the Philippines with the 1st Filipino Infantry Regiment, rising to the rank of first sergeant. After the war Robles was commissioned a second lieutenant in the U.S. Army Civil Affairs, where he contracted Filipino entertainers for the U.S. military. He returned to the U.S. and civilian life in February 1946.

In addition to appearing in several Hollywood films such as Nocturne (1946), Singapore (1947) (which starred Ava Gardner and Fred MacMurray) and Omoo-Omoo, the Shark God (1949), Robles returned to the Philippines where he raised a family and started to produce, direct and star in his own films. One of his last on-screen appearances was in an episode of Alfred Hitchcock Presents in 1956.

== Death ==
On 11 August 1970, Robles died in Manila at the age of 60.

== Filmography ==
=== Film ===
Year	Title	Role	Notes
1939	The Real Glory	Lt. Yabo	Credited as Ruby Robles
1940	South of Pago Pago	Luna	
1941	The Blonde from Singapore	Servant	Uncredited
1941	Honolulu Lu	Elevator Boy	Uncredited
1942	Blue, White and Perfect	Kali - Chauffeur	Uncredited
1942	Song of the Islands	Akomi - Native Boy	Uncredited
1942	The Adventures of Martin Eden	San	Uncredited; Alternative title: High Seas
1942	Submarine Raider	Steward Seffi	
1942	Wake Island	Triunfo	Uncredited
1942	Across the Pacific	A Filipino Assassin	
1942	Manila Calling	Moro Soldier	Uncredited
1946	Nocturne	Eujemio	Uncredited
1947	The Son of Rusty	Gono, Gibson's Valet	
1947	Singapore	Desk Clerk	Uncredited
1948	Jungle Goddess	Nugara	
1949	Rusty Saves a Life	Gono Sandoval	
1949	Flaxy Martin	Butler	Uncredited
1949	Omoo-Omoo, the Shark God	Tembo	
1950	Princesa sa Tawi-Tawi		Director
1952	Okinawa	Felix	
1955	Double Jeopardy	Frank	Uncredited
1960	Party Line		(final film role)

=== Television ===
Year	Title	Role	Notes
1956	Alfred Hitchcock Presents	Horace the Butler	Season 1 Episode 26: "Whodunit"
1956	Passport to Danger	Steward	2 episodes
1955–1956	Soldiers of Fortune	Various roles	2 episodes
