= City That Never Sleeps =

1953 film by John H. Auer

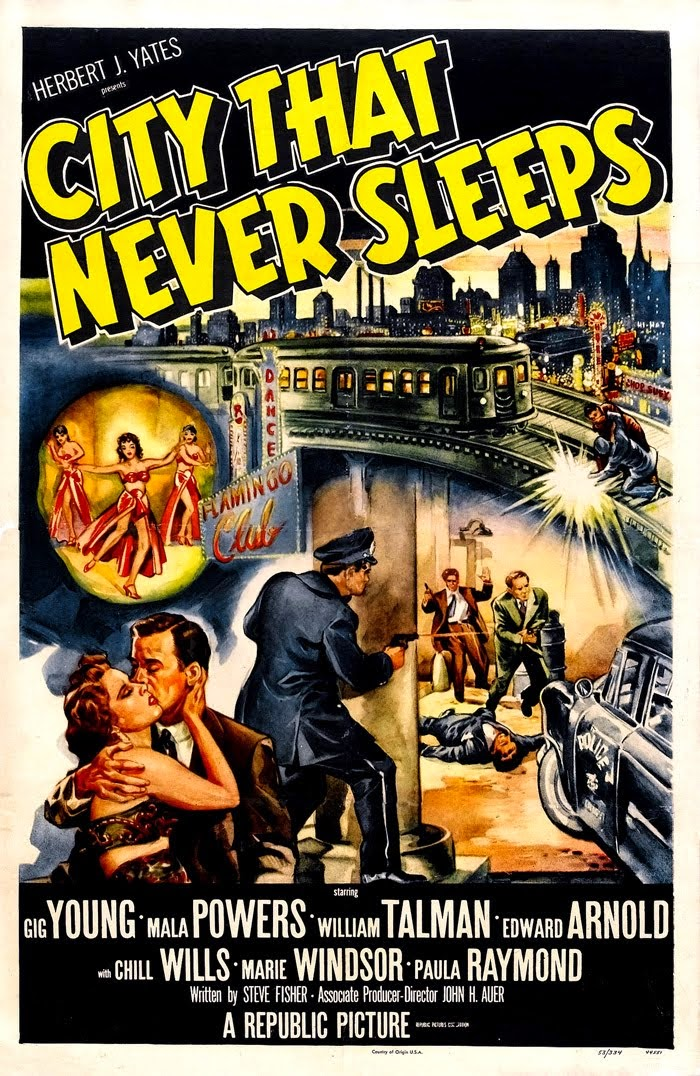
- Theatrical release poster
- Directed by: John H. Auer
- Screenplay by: Steve Fisher
- Produced by: John H. Auer
- Starring: Gig Young; Mala Powers; William Talman; Edward Arnold; Chill Wills; Marie Windsor; Paula Raymond
- Cinematography: John L. Russell
- Edited by: Fred Allen
- Music by: R. Dale Butts
- Color process: Black and white
- Production company: Republic Pictures
- Distributed by: Republic Pictures
- Release date: June 12, 1953
- Running time: 91 minutes
- Country: United States
- Language: English

City That Never Sleeps is a 1953 American film noir crime film starring Gig Young, Mala Powers, William Talman, Edward Arnold, with Chill Wills, Marie Windsor, and Paula Raymond in support. It was directed by John H. Auer, with cinematography by John L. Russell.

== Plot ==
The "Voice of Chicago" introduces the world and the main characters of the film: Sally "Angel Face" Connors (Mala Powers) is an exotic dancer in a nightclub; Gregg Warren (Wally Cassell), a former actor, works as a performance artist, a "Mechanical Man", in the nightclub window; Johnny Kelly (Gig Young) is a cop having an affair with Angel Face and struggling with his conscience whether to leave his wife; Penrod Biddel (Edward Arnold), is a successful and smooth but crooked attorney; and Hayes Stewart (William Talman) has given up magic for a career as a pickpocket and thief.

Officer Johnny Kelly is disillusioned with his job, which he took to please his father. He writes a letter of resignation, which he intends to hand in at the end of his night shift. He calls Biddel to accept an employment offer profered him, and agrees to meet the shyster later that evening. Johnny's wife Kathy Kelly (Paula Raymond) discovers Johnny's plan to quit his job and calls his father, Sgt. John Kelly Sr. (Otto Hulett), to ask him to intervene; Kelly Sr. is concerned for his son's happiness and has a talk with Johnny. Johnny's regular partner calls in sick and his replacement is Sgt. Joe (Chill Wills), the earlier "Voice of Chicago". As they begin, Sgt. Joe has plenty of homespun advice for Johnny, whose negativity casts a pall around them.

As the night progresses, Johnny visits Angel Face to re-affirm their plans to go away. He also meets with Biddel, who asks Johnny to pick up Stewart and leave him across the state line for the Indiana Police to arrest and jail. Johnny refuses, but relents when Biddel reveals that Johnny's brother 'Stubby' (Ron Hagerthy) is associating with Stewart and will surely get into trouble unless Johnny does what is asked. The lawyer pays Johnny $5,000 for the job, but, knowing Biddel is out to get him, Stewart escapes.

Johnny and Sgt. Joe answer a call for a woman in labor; Johnny delivers they baby. They also respond to an illegal gambling game on the street, arresting the ringleader and returning the money to the swindled. After each call, Sgt. Joe lays out another bit of wisdom that seemingly spurs Johnny to re-evaluate his life.

Stewart has obtained incriminating evidence on Biddel and is having an affair with his wife, Lydia (Marie Windsor). Stewart shoots Biddel, and he and Lydia escape to the nightclub where Angel Face dances. Having discovered Biddel's agreement with Johnny to take him out of the state, Stewart calls the police and asks to meet with Officer Kelly. Johnny's father takes the call, and, mistaken by Stewart for his son, is shot. He dies in Johnny's arms.

Stewart takes Lydia, and Stubby and escapes but can't get far because the police are closing in. Stewart shoots Lydia dead in front of the nightclub window where Gregg Warren is performing as the Mechanical Man. He stays close by, unsure whether the Mechanical Man is human or a robot. Warren is in love with Angel Face, but thinks he can bait the killer for Johnny. This sense of honor, and his father's murder, makes clear to Johnny what he really holds valuable in his life. As Warren performs in the window, Angel Face confesses from its side that she wants to dream like he does, and do a husband and wife act he had previously suggested. Hearing her intimations of love, the Mechanical Man sheds a telltale tear. Stewart shoots, giving himself away. Stewart pistol-whips Stubby. Kelly goes after Stewart and, after a chase along an elevated railroad track that ends in a fight, Stewart is electrocuted on the live rail and falls to his death.

Johnny reflects on the evening's events, re-evaluates his priorities, and reconciles with his wife. The mysterious Sgt. Joe disappears.

== Cast ==
- Gig Young as Johnny Kelly
- Mala Powers as Sally 'Angel Face' Connors
- William Talman as Hayes Stewart
- Edward Arnold as Penrod Biddel
- Chill Wills as Sgt. Joe, the 'Voice of Chicago'
- Marie Windsor as Lydia Biddel
- Paula Raymond as Kathy Kelly
- Otto Hulett as Sgt. John 'Pop' Kelly Sr.
- Wally Cassell as Gregg Warren
- Ron Hagerthy as Stubby Kelly
- James Andelin as Lt. Parker
- Tom Poston as Detective (billed as Thomas Poston)
- Bunny Kacher as Agnes DuBois
- Philip L. Boddy as Maitre d'Hotel
- Thomas Jones as Fancy Dan
- Leonard Diebold as Cab Driver

== Reception ==
Contemporary reviews were mixed. The staff at Variety magazine gave the film a mixed review, writing, "Production and direction loses itself occasionally in stretching for mood and nuances, whereas a straightline cops-and-robbers action flavor would have been more appropriate. Same flaw is found in the Steve Fisher screen original...John L. Russell's photography makes okay use of Chicago streets and buildings for the low-key, night-life effect required to back the melodrama.

The New York Times' critic Howard Thompson called it a "routine crime melodrama," but singled out Wally Cassell's brief role as "truly fantastic" and William Talman as the cast's standout, "a truly fine performer."

Frequent AllMovie reviewer and Film critic Craig Butler wrote, "City That Never Sleeps is an uneven crime drama, one that contains enough good elements that it's frustrating the film as a whole is not better. The chief culprit is, as so often, the screenplay, which starts out promisingly. Gig Young's character seems to be one that is fairly complex, a cop who is dissatisfied with his lot in life and could fall prey to temptation. Unfortunately, the character is not developed sufficiently beyond that, which is also the case with the Wally Cassell "mechanical man" character; he, too, shows promise that goes unfulfilled, although the sheer strangeness of his job does fascinate.

Film noir author and TCM Noir Alley host Eddie Muller listed it as one of his Top 25 Noir Films.

== Release ==
The film was released by Republic Pictures on June 6, 1953. Run time was 90 minutes.

=== Rerelease ===
On February 3, 2018, director Martin Scorsese introduced a newly restored print of City That Never Sleeps as the opening film of a 30 movie retrospective of restored Republic Pictures that Scorsese curated to be exhibited at the Museum of Modern Art in New York City, citing the picture's blazing energy and brilliant creativity.

In February 2019 the film played at the Egyptian in Seattle, introduced by Eddie "Czar of Noir" Muller.

== See also ==
- List of American films of 1953
