= Richard Bartlett =

American film producer

Richard H. Bartlett (8 November 1922 – 11 June 1994), also known as Dick Bartlett, was an American director and producer in film and TV. He also acted and wrote. He is best known for his low budget features in the 1950s and his television work in the late 1950s and early 1960s.

In 1956 he teamed up with Norman Jolley to form Bartlett-Jolley Productions. With Jolley writing, Bartlett directing and both men producing, they made eight movies for Universal-International within two years and worked on critically acclaimed segments of "Wagon Train" and later Cimarron City.

== Select filmography ==
- Silent Raiders (1954)
- The Silver Star (1955)
- The Lonesome Trail (1955)
- Two-Gun Lady (1955)
- I've Lived Before (1956)
- Rock, Pretty Baby! (1956)
- Joe Dakota (1957)
- Money, Women and Guns (1958)
