= The Over-the-Hill Gang Rides Again =

- DVD cover
- Written by: Richard Carr
- Directed by: George McCowan
- Starring: Walter Brennan; Fred Astaire; Edgar Buchanan; Andy Devine; Chill Wills; Lana Wood
- Music by: David Raksin
- Country of origin: United States
- Original language: English

Production
- Producer: Shelley Hull
- Cinematography: Fleet Southcott
- Editor: Richard W. Farrell
- Running time: 75 minutes
- Production company: Thomas-Spelling Productions

Original release
- Release: November 17, 1970

Related
- The Over-the-Hill Gang

The Over-the-Hill Gang Rides Again starring Walter Brennan and Fred Astaire is a 1970 ABC Movie of the Week sequel to the Western comedy The Over-the-Hill Gang. The supporting cast includes Edgar Buchanan, Andy Devine, Chill Wills, Lana Wood, and Burt Mustin (all of whom, except Wood, were in The Over-the-Hill Gang). Like the 1969 original, the sequel involves a group of aging Texas Rangers and was written by Richard Carr and directed by George McCowan.

Pat O'Brien had played the second lead in the first film, but his character was left out of the sequel and he was effectively replaced by Astaire, who was not in the original film.

Richard Widmark played O'Brien's character in a quasi-remake two decades later entitled Once Upon a Texas Train, in which the Over-the-Hill Gang, with an entirely new cast including Stuart Whitman, played supporting roles to Willie Nelson's train robber.

This was the final film for three-time Academy Award-winner Walter Brennan.

== Plot ==
Old and retired Sergeant Nash Crawford, formerly of the Texas Rangers, enters a saloon where his former partner, Gentleman George Asque, plays poker with a man and beats him 10 times in a row. The man calls George a cheater and prepares to draw his gun, but Nash saves his comrade by calling him "Wyatt," making the stranger mistakenly assume he is Wyatt Earp.

The two exit the saloon. Nash gives George a telegram which says that they should go to Waco because former partner the renowned Baltimore Kid is in trouble. It is signed "Friend."

Jason Fitch is marrying Louise Murphy. George and Nash appear on the eve of the wedding to take Jason with them to Waco; they convince him to come by shouting the Ranger code "Brazos!" Jason promises Louise that he will return and leaves with his friends.

In Waco, they find out that "Friend" was Amos Polk, a former outlaw, now a newspaper man. Polk takes them to the Baltimore Kid's crudely marked grave, telling them the Kid had been critically wounded after a deadly robbery at the Wells Fargo office and was then lynched by the townspeople. At first it is unclear why Polk called them, but when he shows them the Kid's wallet, they read a note that the Kid wrote, summoning his comrades when he dies. The four sad friends go to the saloon to commiserate, where they meet a drunk who looks very much like the Baltimore Kid, and is indeed him. They take him back to the newspaper office, and convince Polk to publish that the real Baltimore Kid is alive and well and not an armed robber.

The comrades clean up the Kid and provide him with some new some clothes and a new gun. His gravestone is removed, and he becomes the Waco city marshal; the old Rangers are now his deputies.

Now it is clear to everyone that the bandit who killed the previous marshal and his deputies was only posing as the Kid. The actual gang returns to Waco to retrieve their hidden Wells Fargo contraband and to kill the real Baltimore Kid. A gunfight in the streets of Waco ensues and the Rangers win against the outlaws, but the Kid is shot dead. The citizens of Waco bury the Kid again, this time with honors. The old Rangers leave, but, at the end of the town, the Baltimore Kid is waiting, very much alive, now able to lead a life of peace and quiet. All of them go with Jason Fitch, who still has his wedding to attend.

== Cast ==
- Walter Brennan as Nash Crawford
- Fred Astaire as the Baltimore Kid
- Edgar Buchanan as Jason Fitch
- Andy Devine as Amos Polk
- Chill Wills as Gentleman George Asque
- Paul Richards as Sam Braham
- Lana Wood as Katie Flavin
- Parley Baer as Waco Mayor
- Walter Burke as Mac a.k.a. Tom (Waco Stableman)
- Lillian Bronson as Mrs. Louise Murphy
- Jonathan Hole as Parson
- Burt Mustin as Best Man
- Don Wilbanks as Bar X Cowboy
- Pepper Martin as Drifter
- Eddie Quillan as Silver Dollar Bartender (uncredited)

== Reception ==
The Los Angeles Times called it "very pallid and silly".
