= Hopalong Cassidy (TV series) =

American Western television series (1949–1952)

- Title card for Hopalong Cassidy, 1949
- Genre: Western
- Starring: William Boyd
- Country of origin: United States
- Original language: English

Production
- Production companies: William Boyd Productions; B.B. Productions

Original release
- Network: NBC
- Release: 1949 – 1952

Hopalong Cassidy is an American Western television series that ran from 1949 to 1952 on NBC, starring William Boyd as Hopalong Cassidy, a fictional gunslinger who had been created by writer Clarence E. Mulford. It was the first Western television series. The series began as simply broadcasts of edited versions of previous Hopalong Cassidy films, all of which had starred Boyd (66 such films had been produced between 1935 and 1948). Eventually, the series transitioned to original episodes, with a new cast of characters and actors, notably Edgar Buchanan as Hopalong's sidekick Red Connors. The show was created and produced by Boyd.

Hopalong Cassidy was a hit, especially among children, and helped lead to a wave of other Western TV series, including The Gene Autry Show and The Roy Rogers Show. It also did well in merchandising, including spawning the first TV series-themed lunchbox.

== Production history ==
The Hopalong Cassidy film series ended in 1948, due to declining revenues, and their star William Boyd, then 53 years old, was regarded as a film star of the past. However, Boyd thought Hopalong Cassidy might have a future in television, and spent $350,000 to obtain the rights to his old films; he sold or mortgaged almost everything he owned to raise the money.

In November 1948 Boyd persuaded the Los Angeles NBC television station to air one Hopalong Cassidy film for a $200 rental fee. This was when almost all TV programs ran only five, 15, or 30 minutes each, like radio shows, so a feature film on TV was a special event. The broadcast was so successful that NBC rented the entire library from Boyd and broadcast the films on its national network.

While the feature films were airing on NBC, Boyd wasted no time in assembling a cast and crew to produce new half-hour films for television, again for NBC. Hopalong Cassidy began airing on June 24, 1949, and was the first network Western television series, predating The Lone Ranger by several months. The production schedule was so rushed that his movie co-star Andy Clyde couldn't rearrange his schedule of film-studio commitments (Clyde did remain with Boyd on radio and for children's records). Edgar Buchanan was the new TV sidekick, Red Connors (a character from the original stories and a few of the early films).

The theme music for the show was written by Nacio Herb Brown (music) and L. Wolfe Gilbert (lyrics).

== Reception ==
The show ranked number 7 in the 1949 Nielsen ratings, number 9 in the 1950–1951 season and number 28 in 1951–1952.

== Influence and legacy ==
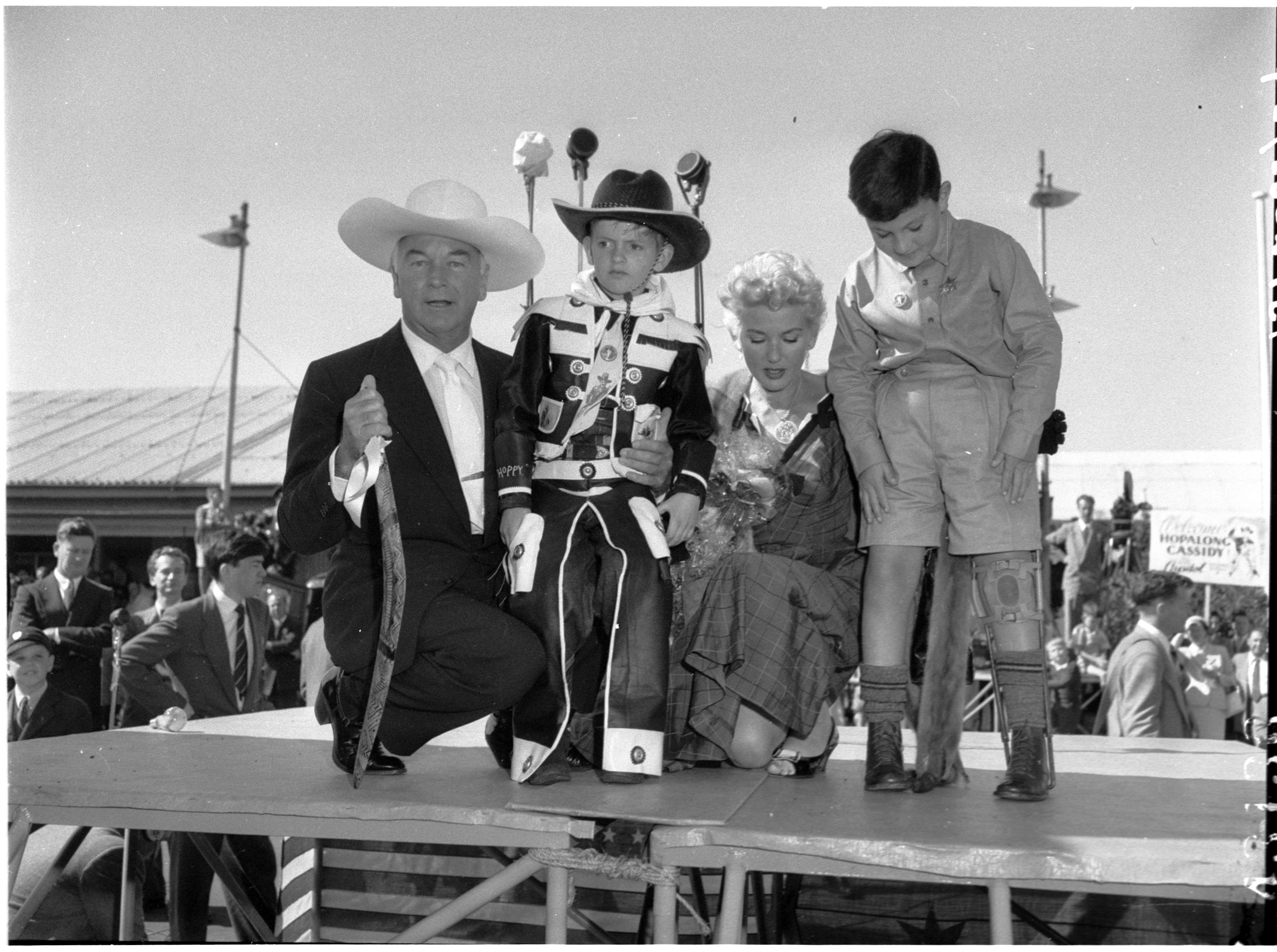
Hopalong Cassidy, (actor William Boyd), and his wife Grace, Mascot, Sydney, 26 November 1954

The series and character were so popular that Hopalong Cassidy was featured on the cover of national magazines such as Look, Life, and Time.

Boyd earned millions from the series ($800,000 in 1950 alone), mostly from merchandise licensing and endorsement deals. In 1950, Hopalong Cassidy was featured on the first lunchbox to bear an image, causing sales of Aladdin lunch boxes to jump from 50,000 units to 600,000 units per year. In 1950, more than 100 companies manufactured $70 million of Hopalong Cassidy products, including children's dinnerware, pillows, roller skates, soap, wristwatches (made by Timex), and jackknives. The 1951 Christmas song "It's Beginning to Look a Lot Like Christmas" by Meredith Willson mentions "A pair of Hopalong boots" in its list of gifts that children will want.

There was a new demand for Hopalong Cassidy features in movie theaters, and Boyd licensed reissue distributor Film Classics to make new film prints and advertising accessories. Another 1950 enterprise saw the home-movie company Castle Films manufacturing condensed versions of the Paramount films for 16 mm and 8 mm film projectors; they were sold through 1966. Also, in January 1950 Dan Spiegel began to draw a syndicated comic strip with scripts by screenwriter Royal King Cole; the strip lasted until 1955.

The success of the show and tie-ins inspired juvenile television westerns such as The Range Rider, Tales of the Texas Rangers, Annie Oakley, The Gene Autry Show, and The Roy Rogers Show.

== Home media and syndication ==
On June 7, 2011, Timeless Media Group released Hopalong Cassidy: The Complete Television Series on DVD in Region 1. The 6-disc set features all 52 episodes of the series restored and remastered.

In the 2010s, the series aired on Cozi TV and on Encore's western channels.
