= Two-Gun Lady =

- Theatrical release poster
- Directed by: Richard Bartlett
- Screenplay by: Norman Jolley, Richard Bartlett
- Produced by: Richard Bartlett
- Starring: Peggie Castle, William Talman, Marie Windsor
- Cinematography: Guy Roe
- Edited by: Carl Pierson
- Music by: Leon Klatzkin
- Production companies: L&B Productions
- Distributed by: Associated Film Releasing Corporation
- Release date: December 7, 1955 (San Francisco)
- Running time: 71 minutes
- Country: United States
- Language: English

Two-Gun Lady is a 1955 American western film directed and produced by Richard Bartlett and starring Peggie Castle, William Talman, and Marie Windsor. The working title was Six Gun Lady.

== Plot ==
A young woman named Kate Masters, who has become a trick shooter, works to track down and kill the men who murdered her parents when she was a child. At the same time, Marshal Dan Corbin is under cover trying to find the same men.

== Cast ==
- Peggie Castle as Karen Marshall, also known as Kate Masters
- William Talman as Marshal Dan Corbin
- Marie Windsor as Bess
- Earle Lyon as Ben Ivers
- Robert Lowery as 'Big Mike' Dougherty
- Ian MacDonald as Jud Ivers
- Joe Besser as Doc McGinnis
- Barbara Turner as Jenny Ivers
- Arvo Ojala as Ivers' Henchman
- Kit Carson as Pete
