= Piute County School District =

School district in Utah, United States

Address
- 500 North Main Street; PO Box 69 Junction, Utah, 84740; United States

District information
- Type: Public
- Motto: Preparing Children for the Future
- Grades: K - 12
- Superintendent: Shane Erickson
- Governing agency: Utah Department of Education
- Schools: 2 elementary schools; 1 high school; 1 special school
- NCES District ID: 4900780

Students and staff
- Students: 308
- Teachers: 26

Other information
- Website: www.piutek12.org

Piute County School District is a school district located in Piute County in southern Utah, United States. It serves all the communities within Piute County and is the third smallest of the 41 school districts within the state in terms of student enrollment.

== Communities served ==
The Piute County School District serves the following communities:

- Circleville
- Greenwich
- Junction
- Kingston
- Marysvale

== Schools ==
The following are schools within the Piute County School District:

=== Elementary schools ===
- Circleville Elementary School - Circleville
- Oscarson Elementary School - Marysvale

=== High schools ===
- Piute High School - Junction

=== Special schools ===
- Storm Ridge Ranch - Marysvale

== See also ==
- List of school districts in Utah
