= The Sheepman =

1958 film

- Theatrical release poster
- Directed by: George Marshall
- Screenplay by: William Bowers; James Edward Grant
- Story by: James Edward Grant
- Produced by: Edmund Grainger
- Starring: Glenn Ford; Shirley MacLaine; Leslie Nielsen
- Cinematography: Robert J. Bronner
- Edited by: Ralph E. Winters
- Music by: Jeff Alexander
- Production company: Metro-Goldwyn-Mayer
- Distributed by: Metro-Goldwyn-Mayer
- Release date: May 7, 1958
- Running time: 85 minutes
- Country: United States
- Language: English
- Budget: $1,283,000
- Box office: $3,735,000

The Sheepman is a 1958 American Western comedy film directed by George Marshall and starring Glenn Ford, Shirley MacLaine, and Leslie Nielsen.

== Plot ==
Gambler Jason Sweet wins a flock of sheep in a poker game and proceeds to take them by train into the middle of cattle country. Before long, the townsfolk take notice (and object), but Sweet is more than up to the challenge.

The first thing he does is pick a fight with the roughest, toughest man around, "Jumbo" McCall, and beats him up. He also reveals himself to be an expert with a gun. Dell Payton does not know what to make of him, but is attracted to him, as he is to her. Her fiancé, local cattle baron "Colonel" Steven Bedford, is troubled by this, and also because Sweet and he know each other. The newcomer recognizes Bedford as an old acquaintance named Johnny Bledsoe, a card shark and gunfighter gone respectable.

When Bedford finds himself losing their battle for domination, despite initially having the whole town behind him, he sends for Chocktaw Neal. Chocktaw and his two buddies all have grudges against Sweet, while Sweet has been searching for Chocktaw to settle a score. Chocktaw tries to goad Sweet into a shootout, but Sweet spots Chocktaw's friends waiting in ambush with their rifles. Dell and Milt Masters are able to disarm them, and Chocktaw, suddenly aware he is alone, panics and draws on Sweet, but loses and dies. The final showdown then comes down to Bedford and Sweet, and Bedford ends up dead.

Later, to Dell's utter astonishment, Sweet sells the sheep so he can buy cattle. He explains that he only kept them because he refused to be pushed around by anybody. The couple then rides away.

== Cast ==
- Glenn Ford as Jason Sweet
- Shirley MacLaine as Dell Payton
- Leslie Nielsen as "Colonel" Stephen Bedford / Johnny Bledsoe
- Mickey Shaughnessy as "Jumbo" McCall
- Edgar Buchanan as Milt Masters
- Willis Bouchey as Frank Payton, Dell's father
- Pernell Roberts as Chocktaw Neal
- Slim Pickens as Marshal, who goes fishing whenever trouble is likely
- Robert 'Buzz' Henry as Red
- Pedro Gonzalez Gonzalez as Angelo, one of Sweet's shepherds
- Percy Helton as Station Master (uncredited)
- Richard Alexander as Barfly (uncredited)
- Tom London as Townsman (uncredited)

== Box office ==
According to MGM records, the film earned $1,535,000 in the US and Canada and $2.2 million elsewhere, resulting in a profit of $976,000.

== Award nominations ==
William Bowers and James Edward Grant were nominated for an Oscar for Best Writing, Story and Screenplay - Written Directly for the Screen.

The two BAFTA nominations were: Best Film from any source, and Glenn Ford for Best Foreign Actor.
