= Ian MacDonald (actor) =

American actor (1914–1978)

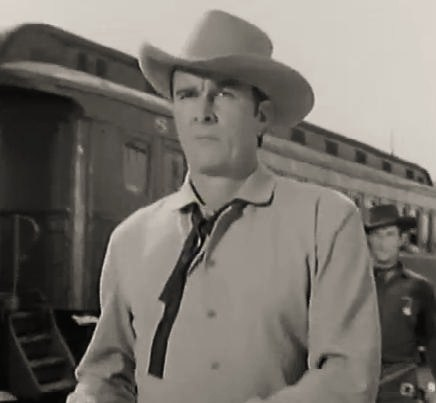
- MacDonald in High Noon (1952)
- Born: Ulva W. Pippy; June 28, 1914; Great Falls, Montana, U.S.
- Died: April 11, 1978 (aged 63); Bozeman, Montana, U.S.
- Resting place: Montana
- Occupation: Actor
- Years active: 1931–1960
- Spouse: Shirley Kannegaard (m. 1967)

Ian MacDonald (born Ulva W. Pippy, June 28, 1914 – April 11, 1978) was an American actor and producer during the 1940s and 1950s. He is perhaps best known as villain Frank Miller in High Noon (1952).

== Early years ==
MacDonald was the son of Rev. William Pippy and Sarah MacDonald Pippy. He attended schools in Helena, Montana, and developed an interest in acting while he was a student at Helena High School. He continued acting at Intermountain College in Helena, from which he graduated in 1934.

He taught school for two years in Marysville before he moved to Hollywood, after which he washed dishes at a YMCA and studied drama at the Pasadena Community Playhouse.

== Military service ==
MacDonald served in the U.S. Army Signal Corps during World War II. He entered on July 13, 1942, and was discharged on April 15, 1946, reaching the rank of captain.

== Career ==
McDonald played the uncredited colonel in the movie Battleground (1949) who delivered the "Nuts" reply to the German officers demanding that the American forces surrender.

== Personal life ==
On June 17, 1967, in Santa Monica, California, MacDonald married Shirley Kannegaard, a nurse whom he met when he was a patient at Fort Harrison Veterans Hospital. They remained wed until his death.

== Death ==
On April 11, 1978, MacDonald died at his home in Bozeman, Montana, of cardiac arrest from complications of Parkinson's disease, age 63.

== Selected filmography ==
- Stick to Your Guns (1941) - Henchman Elbows
- Secret of the Wastelands (1941) - Hollister
- They Died with Their Boots On (1941) - Soldier (uncredited)
- Swamp Woman (1941) - Det. Lt. Rance
- The Adventures of Martin Eden (1942) - 'Butch' Raglan
- North of the Rockies (1942) - Lazare
- The Strange Woman (1946) - Boat Captain (uncredited)
- Ramrod (1947) - Walt Shipley
- Pursued (1947) - A Callum (uncredited)
- Deep Valley (1947) - Blast Foreman (uncredited)
- Dark Passage (1947) - Cop in Bus Depot (uncredited)
- My Girl Tisa (1948) - Guard (uncredited)
- The Woman from Tangier (1948) - Paul Moreles
- Mr. Reckless (1948) - Jim Halsey
- Port Said (1948) - Jakoll
- Speed to Spare (1948) - Pusher Wilkes
- Sixteen Fathoms Deep (1948) - Nick
- A Southern Yankee (1948) - Hospital Orderly (uncredited)
- The Man from Colorado (1948) - Jack Rawson (uncredited)
- Road House (1948) - Police Captain
- Song of India (1949) - Prince's Officer (uncredited)
- Joe Palooka in the Big Fight (1949) - Mike
- Streets of San Francisco (1949) - Luke Fraser
- Come to the Stable (1949) - Mr. Matthews (uncredited)
- White Heat (1949) - Bo Creel (uncredited)
- Battleground (1949) - Army Colonel (uncredited)
- Malaya (1949) - Carlos Tassuma
- Montana (1950) - Slim Reeves
- Whirlpool (1950) - Hogan - Store Detective (uncredited)
- Comanche Territory (1950) - Walshy
- Colt .45 (1950) - Miller
- The Lawless (1950) - Al Peters
- Where the Sidewalk Ends (1950) - Detective Casey (uncredited)
- The Desert Hawk (1950) - Yussef
- Thunder in God's Country (1951) - Smitty
- New Mexico (1951) - Pvt. Daniels
- The Texas Rangers (1951) - The Sundance Kid
- Show Boat (1951) - Drunken Sport (uncredited)
- Ten Tall Men (1951) - Lustig
- The Barefoot Mailman (1951) - Theron Henchman (uncredited)
- This Woman Is Dangerous (1952) - Joe Grossland, Private Eye
- Flaming Feather (1952) - Tombstone Jack
- High Noon (1952) - Frank Miller
- The Brigand (1952) - Maj. Schrock
- The Savage (1952) - Chief Yellow Eagle
- Toughest Man in Arizona (1952) - Steve Girard
- Hiawatha (1952) - Chief Megissogwon
- The Silver Whip (1953) - Hank
- A Perilous Journey (1953) - Sprague
- Blowing Wild (1953) - Jackson
- Taza, Son of Cochise (1954) - Geronimo
- Johnny Guitar (1954) - Pete
- Apache (1954) - Clagg
- The Egyptian (1954) - Ship's Captain (uncredited)
- They Were So Young (1954) - General Rodriguez Garcia (uncredited)
- Timberjack (1955) - Pauquette
- Son of Sinbad (1955) - Murad
- The Lonesome Trail (1955) - Gonaga
- Two-Gun Lady (1955) - Jud Ivers
- Accused of Murder (1956) - Trumbull
- Stagecoach to Fury (1956) - Sheriff Ross
- Duel at Apache Wells (1957) - Marcus Wolf
- Money, Women and Guns (1958) - Nibbs
- Warlock (1959) - MacDonald (uncredited)
