= Edgar Buchanan =

American actor (1903–1979)

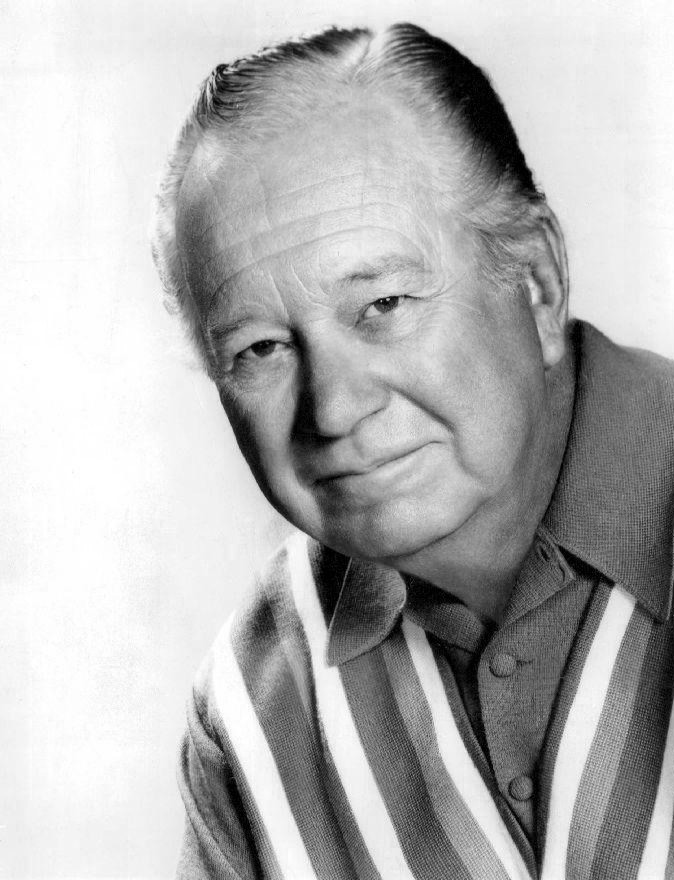
- Buchanan c. 1971
- Born: William Edgar Buchanan II; March 20, 1903; Humansville, Missouri, U.S.
- Died: April 4, 1979 (aged 76); Palm Desert, California, U.S.
- Education: North Pacific College (DDS)
- Occupations: Dentist; actor; singer
- Years active: 1939–1974
- Spouse: Mildred Marguerite Spence (m. 1928–1979)
- Children: 1

William Edgar Buchanan II (March 20, 1903 – April 4, 1979) was an American actor with a long career in both film and television. He is most familiar today as Uncle Joe Carson from the Petticoat Junction, Green Acres, and The Beverly Hillbillies television sitcoms of the 1960s.

== Biography ==
=== Early life ===
Edgar Buchanan was born to Rose (Kee) Buchanan and William Edgar Buchanan Sr., DDS, in Humansville, Missouri. He moved with his family to Oregon when he was seven. His father had a dental practice in Eugene, Oregon, and encouraged his son to follow suit. Buchanan Sr. did not approve of his son's acting ambitions and pushed him to pursue dentistry, instead. According to authors Arden and Joan Christen, Edgar's father believed "to choose a career in the theater was to settle for a life of mediocrity and uncertainty". Nevertheless, Edgar took courses in theater at the University of Oregon as a premedical student and was part of a Portland acting troupe in graduate school. He was also involved in the founding of the Portland Civic Theatre.

In 1928, Edgar earned his DDS degree from North Pacific College School of Dentistry in Portland, Oregon, which later became Oregon Health & Science University School of Dentistry. During his time there, he met his future wife, Mildred "Millie" Spence (1907–1987). They married in 1928 - the same year they both graduated with dental degrees. The couple adopted a son and named him William Edgar "Buck" Buchanan III.

Big changes came in 1939 when the family of three relocated their dental practice from Eugene, Oregon, to Altadena, California. There, Edgar joined the Pasadena Playhouse as an actor. Studio scouts spotted him performing at the playhouse and signed him into a seven-year deal in Hollywood. That same year, he appeared in his first film at age 36, and he left dentistry for good. Meanwhile, his wife, Dr. Millie Buchanan, DDS, took over the dental practice while also supporting her husband's new career as his talent manager.

Edgar was a member of Theta Chi fraternity and a Freemason.

=== Career ===
Buchanan appeared in more than 100 films, including Texas (1941), in which he played a dentist and appeared with William Holden and Glenn Ford and later in Penny Serenade (1941) with Irene Dunne and Cary Grant, Tombstone, the Town Too Tough to Die (1942), The Talk of the Town (1942) with Ronald Colman, Cary Grant and Jean Arthur, The Man from Colorado (1948), Cheaper by the Dozen (1950), Shane (1953), She Couldn't Say No (1954), Ride the High Country (1962) with Randolph Scott and Joel McCrea, McLintock! (1963) with John Wayne, Move Over, Darling (1963) with Doris Day and James Garner, and Benji (1974).

Among the many television series in which he was cast as a guest star were Cimarron City, The Californians, and The Rifleman. Edgar appeared in six episodes of The Rifleman, playing Grandpa Fogerty in "The Long Goodbye" (episode 119) and Doc Burrage in the other five: "The Pet" (episode 15), "The Second Witness" (episode 23), "The Trade" (episode 24), "The Deadly Wait" (episode 26), and "The Angry Man" (episode 31). In addition to several other widely varying roles on the series (running the gamut from sympathetic parts to vicious villains), he portrayed Jed Christianson in the episode "Duel at Sundown" on Maverick with James Garner and Clint Eastwood. He was on Leave It to Beaver (as both "Uncle Billy" and "Captain Jack"), The Twilight Zone, Riverboat (as Wingate Pardee in the 1960 episode, "Duel on the River"), Gunsmoke (in 1962 as the title character "Old Dan" - S7E18), Route 66, Bringing Up Buddy, Bus Stop, and The Lloyd Bridges Show.

Buchanan's roles as a regular cast member in television programs included Red Connors in the syndicated Western Hopalong Cassidy, and J.J. Jackson in the CBS crime drama Cade's County.

Buchanan appeared as Uncle Joe Carson in all 222 episodes of Petticoat Junction, the only actor from the show to do so, as well as in 17 episodes of Green Acres, and three episodes of The Beverly Hillbillies. On Petticoat Junction, he took over as proprietor of the Shady Rest Hotel following the 1968 death of show star Bea Benaderet, who had played Kate Bradley; Buchanan had starred as second lead since the series' inception. In the 1966 episode "The All-Night Party" and in the 1969 episode "Kathy Jo's First Birthday Party", he appeared with his real-life son, Buck (who had a cameo as a party goer and an ice cream vendor, respectively). Another star from Petticoat Junction and he appeared together in the 1974 movie Benji; the other "star" was Higgins the dog, which portrayed the title character.

Buchanan appeared in multiple episodes of Tales of Wells Fargo, starring Dale Robertson, appearing sporadically from 1957 to 1961. He had the recurring role of a rascally ex-outlaw and occasional dentist named Doc Dawson.

In 1967, Dot Records released "Phantom 309" (Dot #17047), a narration by Buchanan. The 45 rpm single was backed with "Cotton Picker".

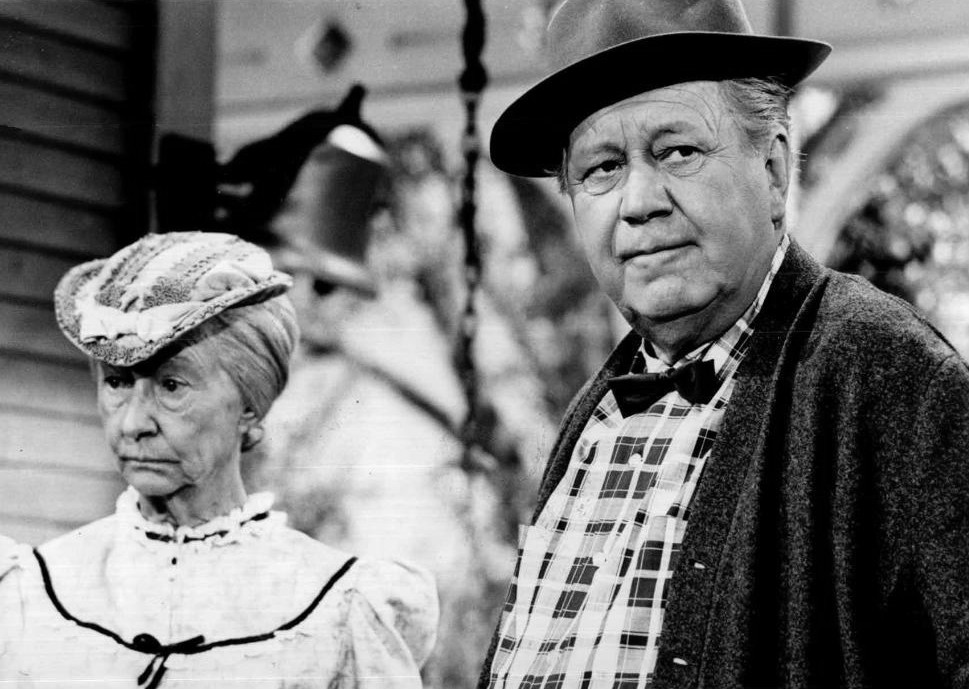
A "crossover" episode: Irene Ryan as "Granny" from The Beverly Hillbillies and Edgar Buchanan as "Uncle Joe" on Petticoat Junction (1968)

=== Death ===
Buchanan died from a stroke complicated by pneumonia in Palm Desert, California, in 1979. He was interred in the Forest Lawn - Hollywood Hills Cemetery in Los Angeles.

== Filmography ==
Year	Title	Role	Notes
1939	My Son Is Guilty	Dan, Bartender	
1940	Too Many Husbands	Detective Adolph McDermott	
1940	Three Cheers for the Irish	Party Guest	Uncredited
1940	Tear Gas Squad	Cousin Andy, a Policeman	
1940	Escape to Glory	Charles Atterbee	
1940	The Sea Hawk	Ben Rollins	Uncredited
1940	When the Daltons Rode	Narrator / Old-timer	Uncredited
1940	Arizona	Judge Bogardus	
1941	Penny Serenade	Applejack Carney	
1941	Her First Beau	Elmer Tuttle	
1941	The Richest Man in Town	Pete Martin	
1941	Texas	Buford "Doc" Thorpe	
1941	You Belong to Me	Billings, Groundskeeper	
1942	Tombstone, the Town Too Tough to Die	Curly Bill Brocious	
1942	The Talk of the Town	Sam Yates	
1943	City Without Men	Michael T. Mallory	
1943	The Desperadoes	Uncle Willie McLeod	
1943	Good Luck, Mr. Yates	Jonesey Jones	
1943	Destroyer	Kansas Jackson	
1944	Buffalo Bill	Sergeant Chips McGraw	
1944	Bride by Mistake	Jonathan Connors	
1944	The Impatient Years	Judge	
1944	Strange Affair	Lieutenant Washburn	
1946	The Fighting Guardsman	Pepe, bandit-valet	
1946	Abilene Town	Sheriff 'Bravo' Trimble	
1946	The Bandit of Sherwood Forest	Friar Tuck	
1946	Perilous Holiday	George Richards	
1946	The Walls Came Tumbling Down	Reverend George Bradford	
1946	Renegades	Kirk Dembrow	
1946	If I'm Lucky	Darius J. Magonnagle	
1947	The Sea of Grass	Jeff	
1947	Framed	Jeff Cunningham	
1948	The Swordsman	Angus MacArden	
1948	The Wreck of the Hesperus	George Lockhart	
1948	The Black Arrow	Lawless	
1948	Adventures in Silverado	Dr. Henderson, aka The Monk	
1948	Best Man Wins	Jim Smiley	
1948	Coroner Creek	Sheriff O'Hea	
1948	The Untamed Breed	John Rambeau	
1948	The Man from Colorado	Doc Merroan	
1949	The Walking Hills	Old Willy	
1949	Red Canyon	Jonah Johnson	
1949	Lust for Gold	Wiser	
1949	Any Number Can Play	Ed	
1950	Cheaper by the Dozen	Dr. Burton	
1950	Cargo to Capetown	Sam Bennett	
1950	The Big Hangover	Uncle Fred Mahoney	
1950	Devil's Doorway	Zeke Carmody	
1951	The Great Missouri Raid	Dr. Samuels	
1951	Rawhide	Sam Todd	
1951	Cave of Outlaws	Dobbs	
1951	Silver City	Dutch Surrency	
1952	The Big Trees	Walter 'Yukon' Burns	
1952	Flaming Feather	Sergeant O'Rourke	
1952	Wild Stallion	John Wintergreen	
1952	Toughest Man in Arizona	Jim Hadlock	
1952	She Couldn't Say No	Ed Meeker	
1953	The War of the Worlds	Square Dance Musician	Uncredited
1953	It Happens Every Thursday	Jake	
1953	Shane	Fred Lewis	
1954	Make Haste to Live	Sheriff Lafe	
1954	Human Desire	Alec Simmons	
1954	Dawn at Socorro	Sheriff Cauthen	
1954	Destry	The Honorable Hiram J. Sellers, Mayor	
1955	Rage at Dawn	Judge	
1955	The Silver Star	Will "Bill" Dowdy	
1955	The Lonesome Trail	Dan Wells	
1955	Wichita	Doc Black	
1956	Come Next Spring	Mr. Canary	
1957	Spoilers of the Forest	Tom Duncan	
1958	Day of the Bad Man	Sam Wyckoff	
1958	The Sheepman	Milt Masters	
1959	King of the Wild Stallions	Idaho	
1959	It Started with a Kiss	Congressman Richard Tappe	
1959	Edge of Eternity	Sheriff Edwards	
1959	Hound-Dog Man	Doc Cole	
1959	Stump Run	Buck Gaskin	
1960	Four Fast Guns	Dipper	
1960	Cimarron	Judge Neal Hefner	
1960	Chartroose Caboose	Woody Watts	
1961	Tammy Tell Me True	Judge Carver	
1961	Devil's Partner	Don Lucas	
1961	The Comancheros	Judge Thaddeus Jackson Breen	
1962	Ride the High Country	Judge Tolliver	
1963	Donovan's Reef	Boston Attorney Francis X. O'Brien	
1963	A Ticklish Affair	Captain Martin	
1963	McLintock!	Bunny Dull	
1963	Move Over, Darling	Judge Bryson	
1965	The Rounders	Vince Moore	
1965	The Man from Button Willow	Sorry	Voice
1966	Gunpoint	Bull	
1967	Welcome to Hard Times	Brown	
1969	Angel in My Pocket	Axel Gresham	
1974	Benji	Bill	(final film role)

== Television ==
Year	Title	Role	Notes
1953	Make Room for Daddy	Captain Chris	Season 1 Episode 8: "The Sea Captain"
1952–1954	Hopalong Cassidy	Red Connors	40 episodes
1954	Crown Theatre with Gloria Swanson	Uncle Harry	Episode: "Uncle Harry"
1953, 1955	Cavalcade of America	Horace Greeley; Doc Mathew	4 episodes
1955	Ford Theatre	Papa Mumby	Season 3 Episode 38: "The Mumbysa"
1955	Luke and the Tenderfoot	Luke Herkimer	2 episodes
1955	Screen Directors Playhouse	Sub Royal	Season 1 Episode 8: "The Bush Roper"
1955-1956	Judge Roy Bean	Judge Roy Bean	39 episodes
1956	Strange Stories		Episode: "Con Game"
1956	Crossroads	Bart Alden	Season 2 Episode 10: "The Lamp of Father Cataldo"
1957	The Christophers	John Augustus	Episode: "Sentence Deferred"
1957	Climax!	Spencer / Constable	Season 3 Episode 25: "Avalanche at Devil's Pass"; Season 3 Episode 42: "Deadly Climate"
1958	The Adventures of Jim Bowie	Ringtail Jack	Season 2 Episode 23: "Deaf Smith"
1958	The Restless Gun	Ethan Greenfield; Sheriff Jeb Barnes	Season 1 Episode 30: "Aunt Emma"; Season 1 Episode 35: "The Gold Star"
1958	Studio One	Dan Ferris	Season 10 Episode 43: "Birthday Present"
1958	The Gale Storm Show	Jasper Stokes	Season 3 Episode 4: "Hayride Ahoy"
1958	26 Men		Season 2 Episode 4: "Cross and Doublecross"
1958	Cimarron City	Shanty	Season 1 Episode 7: "Kid on a Calico Horse"
1955–1959	General Electric Theater	Buckskin / Colonel Starbottle / Preacher Bailey; Parson Meachum / Doctor / Timothy Dwight	7 episodes
1958-1959	The Californians	Dutch / Major	Season 1 Episode 33: "The Golden Bride" (1958); Season 2 Episode 30: "One Ton of Peppercorns" (1959)
1959	Lawman	Jess Miller	Season 1 Episode 15: "The Captives"
1959	Trackdown	Tully Saxon	Season 2 Episode 30: "The Trick"
1959	Wanted Dead or Alive	Pop Michaels / Chester Blake	Season 1 Episode 28: "Railroaded"; Season 1 Episode 36: "Amos Carter"
1959	Alfred Hitchcock Presents	Pops	Season 5 Episode 4: "Coyote Moon"
1959	The Deputy	Isbel	Season 1 Episode 14: "Man of Peace"
1959	Whirlybirds	Burton	Season 3 Episode 13: "The Perfect Crime"
1957, 1960	Wagon Train	Thaddeus Briscoe / Ben Mattox	Season 1 Episode 8: "The John Darro Story" (1957); Season 4 Episode 10: "The Jane Hawkins Story" (1959)
1960	Bronco	'Pop' Ben Owens	Season 2 Episode 19: "Winter Kill"
1960	Bat Masterson	Cactus Charlie	Season 3 Episode 1: "Debt of Honor"
1960	Assignment: Underwater	Charlie Noble	Season 1 Episode 7: "Charlie Noble's Pearl"
1960	Stagecoach West	Lum Jensen	Season 1 Episode 7: "Red Sand"
1960	Riverboat	Wingate Pardee	Season 2 Episode 11: "Duel on the River"
1957–1961	Tales of Wells Fargo	Bob Dawson / Doc Dawson	6 episodes
1958–1961	Maverick	Daddy Forge / Jed Christianson / Colonel Hamilton / Sheriff Hadley / Red Daniels	5 episodes
1959-1961	The Rifleman	Doc J. Burrage / Grandpa Fogarty	6 episodes
1960-1961	Bonanza	Hallelujah Hicks; John Henry Hill	Season 2 Episode 11: "The Trail Gang" (1960); Season 2 Episode 34: "Sam Hill" (1961)
1961	Klondike	Sam Perkins	Season 1 Episode 13: "The Golden Burro"
1961	National Velvet	Grandpa Harwell	Season 1 Episode 24: "Grandpa"; Season 1 Episode 30: "Grandpa Returns"
1961	The Barbara Stanwyck Show	Judge Franklin	Season 1 Episode 36: "A Man's Game"
1961	The Tall Man	Archie Keogh	Season 2 Episode 7: "The Judas Palm"
1961	The New Bob Cummings Show		Episode: "The Oxtail Incident"
1961	Bus Stop	Judge Neal	Season 1 Episode 9: "The Man from Bootstrap"
1961	The Andy Griffith Show	Henry Wheeler	Season 2 Episode 9: "Aunt Bee's Brief Encounter"
1958, 1962	Perry Mason	Andy Templet / Judge Edward Daley	Season 2 Episode 11: "The Case of the Perjured Parrot" (1958); Season 6 Episode 10: "The Case of the Lurid Letter" (1962)
1960–1962	Laramie	Calico / Doc / Tully Casper / Cletus McBain	4 episodes
1960–1962	Outlaws	Nulty / Neely	Season 1 Episode 7: "Starfall: Part 1" (1960); Season 2 Episode 24: "All in a Day's Work" (1962)
1960–1962	Route 66	Jack McConkle / Magistrate Abe Chumley	Season 1 Episode 10: "The Beryllium Eater" (1960); Season 3 Episode 2: "Journey to Nineveh" (1962)
1962	The Twilight Zone	Doc Bolton	Season 3 Episode 23: "The Last Rites of Jeff Myrtlebank"
1962	Thriller	Doc O'Connor	Season 2 Episode 24: 'Til Death Do Us Part
1962	Alcoa Premiere	Crab Holman	Season 2 Episode 1: "Flashing Spikes"
1962	Stoney Burke	Vernon Dawes	Season 1 Episode 2: "Fight Night"
1962	Have Gun – Will Travel	Noah Cardiff	Season 6 Episode 12: "Man in an Hourglass"
1962	The Wide Country	Uncle Walter 'Walt' Guthrie	Season 1 Episode 12: "Good Old Uncle Walt"
1962	Dennis the Menace	Mr. Meekin	Season 4 Episode 13: "Dennis and the Hermit"
1957–1963	Leave It to Beaver	Captain Jack / William 'Uncle Billy' Cleaver	3 episodes
1962-1963	The Lloyd Bridges Show	Doc Lawton / Andrew Jackson Tyree	Season 1 Episode 6: "Just Married" (1962); Season 1 Episode 28: "The Tyrees of Capitol Hill" (1963)
1962-1963	Gunsmoke	Dan Witter / Dan York	Season 7 Episode 18: "Old Dan" (1962); Season 8 Episode 34: "Old York" (1963)
1962-1963	Dr. Kildare	Steve Devitt / Judge Manning	Season 1 Episode 16: "The Administrator" (1962); Season 2 Episode 32: "To Each His Own Prison" (1963)
1968	Something for a Lonely Man	Old Man Wolenski	TV movie
1968	The Beverly Hillbillies	Uncle Joe Carson	Season 7 (3 episodes)
1965–1969	Green Acres	Uncle Joe Carson	16 episodes (There were many crossovers from Petticoat Junction cast members in the series)
1969	The Over-the-Hill Gang	Jason Fitch	TV movie
1963–1970	Petticoat Junction	Joseph P. "Uncle Joe" Carson	222 episodes
1970	The Name of the Game	Felson	Season 3 Episode 8: "Little Bear Died Running"
1970	The Mod Squad	Hargis	Season 3 Episode 8: "Welcome to the Human Race, Levi Frazee!"
1970	The Over-the-Hill Gang Rides Again	Jason Fitch	TV movie
1971	"The Men From Shiloh" (rebranded name of The Virginian)	Teddy Birdwell	Season 9 Episode 17: "The Legacy of Spencer Flats"
1971	Yuma	Mules McNeil	TV movie
1971–1972	Cade's County	J.J. Jackson	24 episodes
1972	The Partridge Family	Judge McElwreath	Season 3 Episode 2: "M is for Many Things"
1973	Love, American Style	Judge Brockmerton	Season 4 Episode 14 (Segment: Love and the Family Hour)
