= Leon Klatzkin =

American music composer (1914–1992)

- Born: Leon Steven Klatzkin; June 19, 1914; New York, New York, United States
- Died: May 13, 1992 (aged 77); Marina Del Rey, California, United States
- Occupation: Composer
- Years active: 1947 - 1971 (film & TV)

Leon Steven Klatzkin (1914–1992) was an American music arranger, composer, and conductor remembered for his long career in the Hollywood motion picture and television industries, including the theme tune for the 1950s TV series, Adventures of Superman.

== Biography ==
A prolific film and television composer, orchestra conductor, soundtrack orchestrator and arranger, Klatzkin worked in the music department of the Hal Roach Studios as a musician for eight years, afterwards working throughout Hollywood, notably for 20th Century-Fox. Klatzkin joined ASCAP in 1952, and his list of compositions there numbers over 600, nearly all of them themes for film and television. In the 1960s, Klatzkin was under contract to CBS, and composed and arranged for many shows there, including 84 episodes of the popular western series Gunsmoke.

The opening and closing theme of the TV series Adventures of Superman is credited to Klatzkin.

== Selected filmography ==
- Inner Sanctum (1948)
- As You Were (1951)
- Captain Scarface (1953)
- Two-Gun Lady (1955)
- Go, Johnny, Go! (1959)

== Bibliography ==
- Terrace, Vincent. Encyclopedia of Television Pilots, 1937-2012. McFarland, 2013.
