= Blackmer =

Blackmer is a surname. Notable people with the surname include:

- David E. Blackmer (1927–2002), audio engineer
- Sidney Blackmer (1895–1973), American actor
  - Fulton-Mock-Blackmer House, also called Blackmer House
- Suzanne Blackmer (1912–2004), American actress
- Eunice Murray Blackmer (1902–1994), American housekeeper, nurse and writer

== See also ==
- Blackmer v. United States
