= John Tyrrell (actor) =

American actor (1900-1949)

- Tyrrell in The Three Stooges film So Long Mr. Chumps (1941)
- Born: John Edward Tyrrell; December 7, 1900; The Bronx, New York, United States
- Died: September 20, 1949 (aged 48); The Bronx, New York, United States
- Resting place: Hollywood Forever Cemetery
- Years active: 1916-1947
- Spouse: Grette Ardine

John Edward Tyrrell (December 7, 1900 – September 20, 1949) was an American film actor. He appeared in over 250 films between 1935 and 1947, known for his numerous appearances with the Three Stooges, in a total of 29 shorts with Curly Howard as a third stooge.

== Career ==
Tyrrell was 16 years old when he became involved in vaudeville, part of the team Tyrrell and Mack. Like many actors in the Stooge comedies, Tyrrell was a salaried contract player. The Columbia stock company was called upon to play incidental roles in practically everything the studio produced: important films, low-budget "B" pictures, short subjects, and serials. (Some of these players graduated to stardom, like Lloyd Bridges, Bruce Bennett, Adele Mara and Ann Doran.) John Tyrrell worked steadily at Columbia Pictures from 1935 to 1946 for 11 years. Occasionally, only Tyrrell's voice would be used, as a radio newsman, public-address announcer, or police-call dispatcher. Tyrrell and fellow stock player Eddie Laughton often appeared together in Columbia movies (frequently as mobsters waiting in a getaway car). One of Tyrrell's biggest roles was probably in the 1939 serial Mandrake the Magician, in which he played a masked crime lord's right-hand man. Modern viewers will also remember him in several shorts of The Three Stooges, such as A Plumbing We Will Go as Judge Hadley, B.O. Davis/Lone Wolf Louie in So Long Mr. Chumps, In the Sweet Pie and Pie as the maître d', Williams, Mr. Dill in Dizzy Detectives, and many other of his 29 appearances in the Three Stooges, all of them with Curly Howard. Tyrrell also appeared with Shemp Howard in some of his solo films, including the short A Hit with a Miss, a remake of The Three Stooges short Punch Drunks.

== Death ==
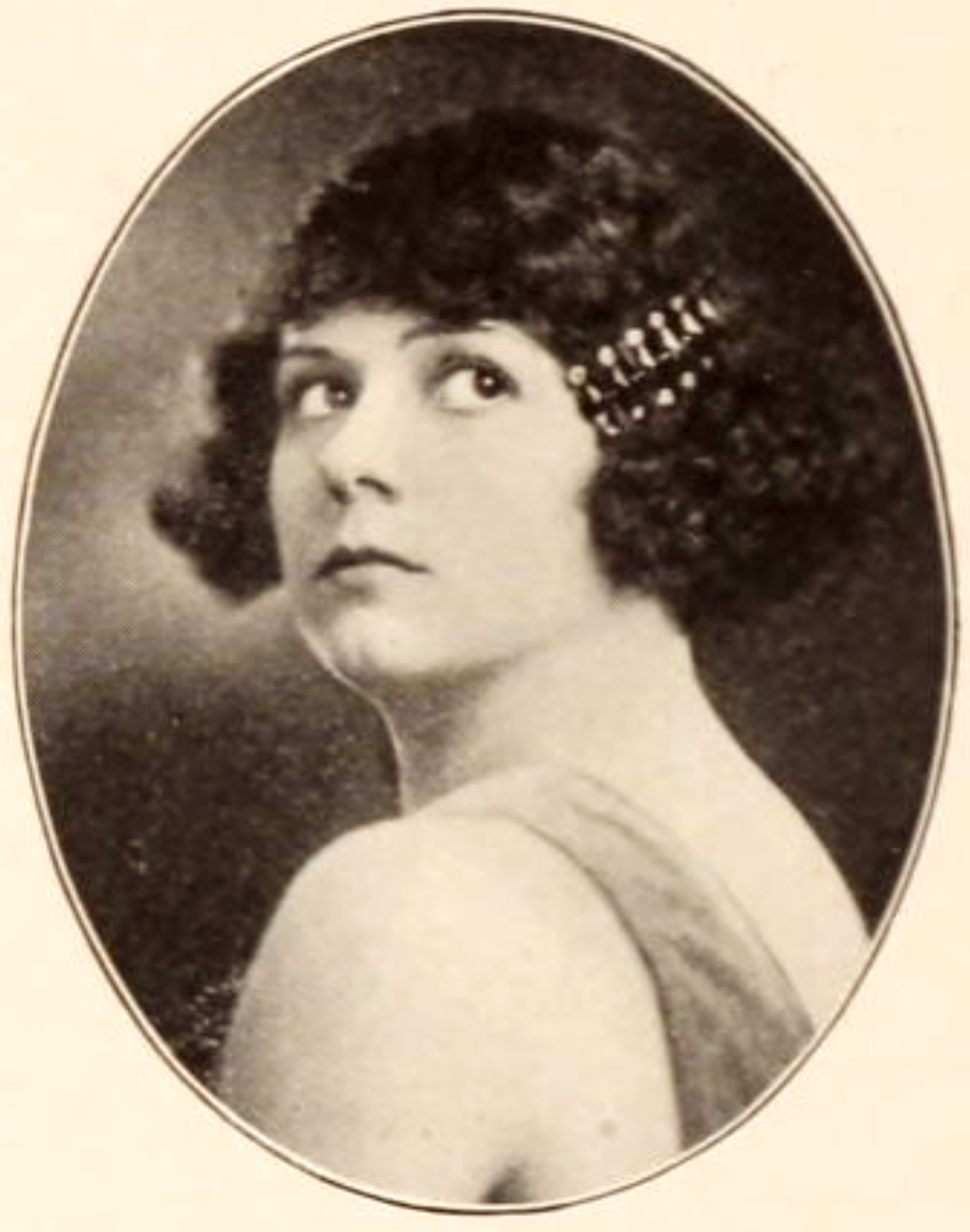
Tyrrell's wife, Grette Ardine.

Tyrrell's final appearance with the Three Stooges was in Uncivil War Birds (1946). After spending several months at Kingsbridge Veteran's Hospital in the Bronx, New York, possibly due to some of his health problems, John Tyrrell died of complications from an undisclosed illness on September 20, 1949, at age 48.

== Selected filmography ==
- The Public Menace (1935) - Photographer (uncredited)
- Three Little Beers (1935)
- Too Tough to Kill (1935) - Henchman (uncredited)
- If You Could Only Cook (1936) - Reporter (uncredited)
- Dangerous Intrigue (1936) - Clerk (uncredited)
- The Music Goes 'Round (1936 film)
- Pride of the Marines (1936) - Sergeant (uncredited)
- Mr. Deeds Goes to Town (1936) - Reporter (uncredited)
- Devil's Squadron (1936) - Mechanic (uncredited)
- Bullets or Ballots (1936) - Red (uncredited)
- Three Smart Girls (1936)
- Counterfeit Lady (1936)
- It Happened in Hollywood (1937)
- Motor Madness (1937)
- The Frame-Up (1937)
- West of Cheyenne (1938)
- Women in Prison (1938)
- Call of the Rockies (1938)
- Smashing the Spy Ring (1939)
- We Want Our Mummy (1939) - Thug in Egyptian garb
- Mandrake the Magician (1939)
- Three Little Sew and Sews (1939)
- The Man They Could Not Hang (1939)
- Mr. Smith Goes to Washington (1939)
- Scandal Sheet (1939)
- The Taming of the West (1939)
- Thundering Frontier (1940)
- You Nazty Spy! (1940)
- A Plumbing We Will Go (1940)
- Nutty but Nice (1940)
- From Nurse to Worse (1940)
- The Secret Seven (1940)
- No Census, No Feeling (1940)
- Boobs in Arms (1940)
- The Face Behind the Mask (1941)
- So Long Mr. Chumps (1941)
- All the World's a Stooge (1941)
- In the Sweet Pie and Pie (1941)
- Some More of Samoa (1941)
- Loco Boy Makes Good (1942)
- What's the Matador? (1942)
- Stand By All Networks (1942)
- Tramp, Tramp, Tramp (1942)
- Three Smart Saps (1942)
- They Stooge to Conga (1943)
- Dizzy Detectives (1943)
- A Gem of a Jam (1943)
- Sergeant Mike (1944)
- Crash Goes the Hash (1944)
- Busy Buddies (1944)
- Sailor's Holiday (1944)
- Gents Without Cents (1944)
- No Dough Boys (1944)
- If a Body Meets a Body (1945) - The Lawyer (uncredited)
- Booby Dupes (1945)
- Micro-Phonies (1945)
- Rough, Tough and Ready (1945)
- Uncivil War Birds (1946) (Final appearance with the Three Stooges)
- Night Editor (1946) - Street Sweeper Driver (uncredited)
- The Phantom Thief (1946) - Police Patrolman (uncredited)
- The Walls Came Tumbling Down (1946) - Grave Digger (uncredited)
- The Secret Life of Walter Mitty (1947) - Department Head (uncredited)
- Best Man Wins (1948) - Dock Officer (Final film role)
