= Eddie Laughton =

British-American actor (1903–52)

- Laughton in The Three Stooges film Idle Roomers (1944)
- Born: 20 June 1903; Sheffield, West Riding of Yorkshire, UK
- Died: 21 March 1952 (aged 48); Hollywood, California, U.S.
- Resting place: Holy Cross Cemetery, Culver City
- Years active: 1935–1952
- Spouse: Mary Eaton (1944–1948) (her death)

Eddie Laughton (20 June 1903 – 21 March 1952) was a British-American film actor. He appeared in more than 200 films between 1935 and 1952, and is best known for his work with The Three Stooges.

== Career ==
Born Edgar Hugh Laughton in Sheffield, Yorkshire, England, his family immigrated to the United States in 1909 and settled in Detroit. He started in vaudeville and by 1926 was established in Toronto as a popular master of ceremonies. Larry Fine, not yet one of the Stooges, was touring in vaudeville, and he and Laughton were old friends. Previously, Fine had saved Laughton's job by going onstage one night as an emergency substitute.

The pencil-mustached Laughton was placed under contract by Columbia Pictures in 1935, almost certainly thanks to Fine. Laughton worked at Columbia almost exclusively for 10 years throughout the 1930s and 1940s, in features, westerns, short subjects, and serials. Modern viewers will remember Laughton for his role as "Percy Pomeroy, convict 41144" in the Stooge comedies So Long Mr. Chumps and Beer Barrel Polecats, the desk clerk in Three Little Beers and Idle Roomers, or the happy drunk in Loco Boy Makes Good. Laughton was an excellent utility player, useful in good-guy and bad-guy roles alike. He and fellow Columbia stock player John Tyrrell shared many scenes, often as getaway-car drivers in features and shorts.

According to the United Kingdom's Cinematograph Films Act of 1927, Hollywood companies had to release Canadian-made films if they wanted their American films to be distributed in Canada. Columbia complied by sending its casts and crews to Canadian studios in 1938 and 1939, where Columbia could exercise some control over the productions. Many of the Columbia contractees sent to Canada had British or Canadian roots, Eddie Laughton among them.

Eddie Laughton was also a convincing dialect comedian, playing a French nobleman in Buster Keaton's She's Oil Mine, and an English big-game hunter plastered with pies in the Stooges' In the Sweet Pie and Pie.

In addition to his roles in the Stooge shorts, he traveled with the team between filming schedules, acting as their straight man in personal appearances.

== Personal life and death ==
Laughton was married to actress Mary Eaton from 1944 until her death in 1948. Laughton died of pneumonia on March 21, 1952, just two months after the death of Curly Howard, who died of a massive cerebral hemorrhage. Both he and Curly were born in 1903, and were both 48 years old when they died within two months of each other in 1952.

== Selected filmography ==
- Three Little Beers (1935)
- Disorder in the Court (1936) - Man Sitting by Letterpress (uncredited)
- A Pain in the Pullman (1936)
- Slippery Silks (1936)
- 3 Dumb Clucks (1937)
- Goofs and Saddles (1937)
- It Happened in Hollywood (1937)
- Cash and Carry (1937)
- No Time to Marry (1938)
- Special Inspector (1938)
- Squadron of Honor (1938)
- We Want Our Mummy (1939) - Cab Driver (uncredited)
- Pest from the West (1939)
- Oily to Bed, Oily to Rise (1939)
- Three Sappy People (1939)
- Beware Spooks! (1939)
- Scandal Sheet (1939)
- Girls of the Road (1940)
- The Secret Seven (1940)
- You Nazty Spy! (1940)
- A Plumbing We Will Go (1940)
- Boobs in Arms (1940)
- So Long Mr. Chumps (1941)
- Dutiful But Dumb (1941)
- Meet Boston Blackie (1941)
- I Was a Prisoner on Devil's Island (1941)
- In the Sweet Pie and Pie (1941)
- Across the Sierras (1941)
- Tillie the Toiler (1941)
- Outlaws of the Panhandle (1941)
- The Boogie Man Will Get You (1942)
- Loco Boy Makes Good (1942)
- Cactus Makes Perfect (1942)
- What's the Matador? (1942)
- Parachute Nurse (1942)
- Atlantic Convoy (1942)
- Alias Boston Blackie (1942)
- Stand By All Networks (1942)
- Three Smart Saps (1942)
- Daring Young Man (1942)
- Bullets for Bandits (1942)
- Busy Buddies (1944)
- Sailor's Holiday (1944)
- Idle Roomers (1944)
- Idiots Deluxe (1945) - Courtroom spectator (uncredited)
- Beer Barrel Polecats (1946, in footage from So Long, Mr. Chumps, final appearance with The Three Stooges)
- The Perils of Pauline (1947)
- Chicken Every Sunday (1949)
- Pest Man Wins - Lion Hunter (in 1941 footage from In the Sweet Pie and Pie)
- Sappy Bull Fighters - Bullring attendant (in 1942 footage from What's the Matador?)
