= Beer Barrel Polecats =

1946 film by Jules White

- Directed by: Jules White
- Written by: Gilbert Pratt
- Produced by: Jules White
- Starring: Moe Howard; Larry Fine; Curly Howard; Vernon Dent; Robert Williams; Eddie Laughton; Joe Palma
- Cinematography: George F. Kelley
- Edited by: Charles Hochberg
- Distributed by: Columbia Pictures
- Release date: January 10, 1946 (U.S.)
- Running time: 17:33
- Country: United States
- Language: English

Beer Barrel Polecats is a 1946 short subject directed by Jules White starring American slapstick comedy team The Three Stooges (Moe Howard, Larry Fine and Curly Howard). It is the 88th entry in the series released by Columbia Pictures starring the comedians, who released 190 shorts for the studio between 1934 and 1959.

== Plot ==
In their quest for beer during Prohibition, the Stooges resort to brewing their own concoction, using a recipe called "Panther Pilsner Beer" (an allusion to the popular slang term for bad alcohol "Panther Piss"). Confusion over which of them were responsible for adding yeast to the mixture leads to a comical explosion.

Despite eventual success, their venture takes a legal turn when Curly inadvertently sells a bottle to an undercover detective at an inflated price, resulting in their incarceration. In prison, the Stooges initiate an escape plan, unintentionally incapacitating the warden in the process.

While serving time on the rock pile, they encounter a fellow inmate and an old acquaintance, Percy Pomeroy, with whom they collaborate on a prison break. The attempt fails, leading to their transfer to solitary confinement.

Decades later, the elderly trio is finally released as senior citizens. Curly expresses his desire for a tall bottle of beer upon freedom, prompting Moe and Larry to intervene by attacking Curly and convincing the warden to return him to jail, thereby avoiding further complications.

== Production notes ==
The title Beer Barrel Polecats is a pun of the song "Beer Barrel Polka". The idea of producing and selling their own beer during Prohibition was borrowed from Laurel and Hardy's 1931 film, Pardon Us.

When the Stooges drop their iron balls chained to their legs, the NBC Chimes are heard, a gag recycled from the team's 1937 short Back to the Woods.

A colorized version of this film was released in 2007 as part of the DVD collection "Hapless Half-Wits."

This short also marks the final appearance of the late Eddie Laughton, who died in 1952, the same year Curly, Duke York, and Dick Curtis all died.

=== Curly's illness ===
Beer Barrel Polecats was filmed over two days on April 25–26, 1945, several months after Curly Howard suffered a minor stroke. His resulting performances were marred by slurred speech and slower timing. DVD Talk critic Stuart Galbraith IV noted that Curly looked "notably thinner (Curly, Moe, and Larry are about the same weight in this) and inexpressive throughout, his face almost like a mask." Curly's illness prevented him from maintaining the vitality for the duration of the normal 4-5 day filming schedule. To compensate for his unavailability, director Jules White utilized footage from In the Sweet Pie and Pie and So Long Mr. Chumps, which featured a healthier and heavier Curly. However, according to threestooges.net, a possible lawsuit by comedian Harold Lloyd resulted in a hastily reworked script; this prompted the use of older footage in the film, and was not related to Curly's illness.
