= Stop! Look! and Laugh! =

1960 film

- Directed by: Jules White (supervision only, no new filming); Don Appell (Paul Winchell sequences); Lou Brandt (Marquis Chimps sequence)
- Written by: Sid Kuller (Marquis Chimps sequence)
- Produced by: Harry Romm; Sid Kuller (Marquis Chimps sequence); Martha Vera Romm (associate producer)
- Starring: Moe Howard; Larry Fine; Curly Howard; Paul Winchell; Jerry Mahoney; Knucklehead Smiff; The Marquis Chimps; Joe Bolton
- Cinematography: William Steiner (Paul Winchell sequences)
- Edited by: Jerome Thoms
- Production company: Harry Romm Productions
- Distributed by: Columbia Pictures
- Release date: July 1, 1960 (U.S.)
- Running time: 78 minutes
- Country: United States
- Language: English

Stop! Look! and Laugh! is a 1960 feature-length Three Stooges compilation film featuring Moe Howard, Larry Fine, and Curly Howard in scenes from 11 movie short subjects of 1937–1947. Additional footage, filmed especially for this production, features ventriloquist Paul Winchell and his dummies Jerry Mahoney and Knucklehead Smiff, and animal act The Marquis Chimps.

== Plot ==
Stop! Look! and Laugh! trailer

Paul Winchell is the paternal figure to Jerry Mahoney, a juvenile character. Jerry hates academic studies and tries various tricks to skip school: darkening his window to simulate nighttime, putting spots on his face to show illness, and manipulating a thermometer to present a dangerously high temperature.

The script has Winchell setting the scene for various episodes with the Stooges. For example, Winchell telephones a mechanic to ask about a car being repaired; the scene cuts to a garage sequence from the Stooge short Higher Than a Kite. The last reel has Winchell trying to sleep while neighbors are having a noisy party. Footage from the Stooge short Half-Wits Holiday is inserted here, with the Stooges starting a pie fight. The film ends with new footage of Winchell bursting into the party scene and getting hit with a pie himself.

== Production notes ==
The project was supervised by the Stooges' former producer-director, Jules White. White is credited as the new feature's director, but he was not involved in the newly staged scenes: "I didn't direct anything, it was all leftovers. I worked on the thing for over a month. We used to run four or five Stooges films in the evening at my house [and] I recut the sequences for placement into the film." The Paul Winchell scenes were staged in New York; the Marquis Chimps footage was staged in Hollywood by veteran comedy writer Sid Kuller. The chimps offer a rendition of Cinderella, narrated in rhyme by Winchell, with voice-over performances by June Foray and Alan Reed.

Officer Joe Bolton, a television host associated with New York City Stooges television programming on WPIX-TV during the early 1970s, makes a cameo appearance as a customer within a cafe scene. This cameo serves as a nod to Bolton's established presence within the Stooges television domain.

Stop! Look! and Laugh! is careful to give screen credit to the source films' original producers, directors, writers, photographers, and film editors. Columbia staff editor Jerome Thoms, who had worked on seven Stooge shorts himself in the early 1940s, assembled Stop! Look! and Laugh!

== Controversy ==
Stop! Look! and Laugh! became embroiled in controversy following a lawsuit initiated by the Stooges against their longtime agent, producer Harry Romm. The Stooges alleged that Romm, who had produced their feature films Swing Parade of 1946 and Have Rocket, Will Travel, had developed the "new" Three Stooges film without consulting them. Columbia Pictures, the eventual distributor, publicly acknowledged their oversight, expressing regret for compiling Three Stooges shorts without obtaining the team's consent.

Both parties subsequently reached a settlement. The film was slated for release on July 4, 1960, with Columbia Pictures agreeing to extend financial support to the Three Stooges and co-manager Norman Maurer's newly established production entity, Normandy Productions. This resolution aimed to address the grievances raised by the Stooges and fostered a collaborative resolution to the dispute. Normandy would ultimately produce four Stooge features that were released by Columbia.

== Featured shorts ==
The following 11 Stooge shorts were featured in Stop! Look! and Laugh!:

- Oily to Bed, Oily to Rise (1939)
- How High Is Up? (1940)
- Violent Is the Word for Curly (1938)
- Sock-a-Bye Baby (1942)
- Higher Than a Kite (1943)
- What's the Matador? (1942)
- Calling All Curs (1939)
- Goofs and Saddles (1937)
- Micro-Phonies (1945)
- A Plumbing We Will Go (1940)
- Half-Wits Holiday (1947)

== See also ==
- List of American films of 1960
