= The Hathaways (TV series) =

American TV situation comedy (1961–1962)

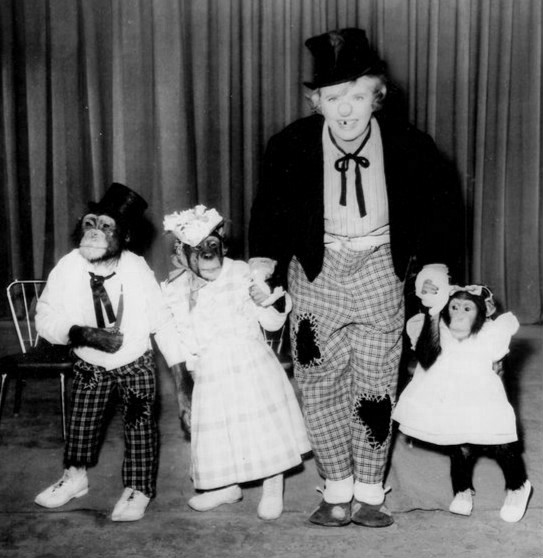
- From left, Charlie, Enoch, Peggy Cass as Elinore Hathaway, and Candy, 1962
- Starring: Peggy Cass; Jack Weston; Mary Grace Canfield; Harvey Lembeck; Barbara Perry
- Theme music composer: Herbert W. Spencer
- Composer: Herbert W. Spencer
- Country of origin: United States
- No. of seasons: 1
- No. of episodes: 26

Production
- Executive producer: Robert Sparks
- Producer: Ezra Stone
- Running time: 30 minutes
- Production companies: Screen Gems, in association with Gloucester Productions, Inc.

Original release
- Network: ABC
- Release: October 6, 1961 – March 30, 1962

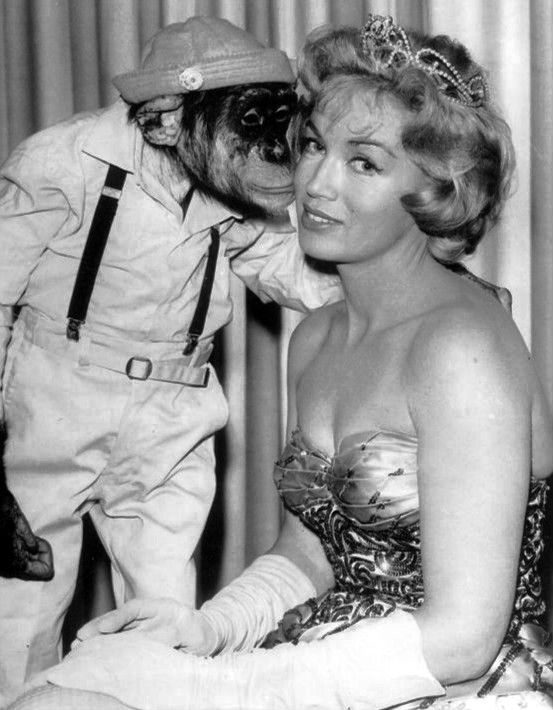
Charlie makes friends with Walter's dancing teacher.

The Hathaways is a 26-episode situation comedy, which aired on ABC from October 6, 1961, to August 31, 1962, or March 30, 1962, starring Peggy Cass and Jack Weston as suburban Los Angeles "parents" to a trio of performing common chimpanzees. Weston portrayed Walter Hathaway, a flabby real estate agent. Cass is his zany bride Elinore, "mother" and booking agent to the Marquis Chimps, named Candy, Charlie, and Enoch. The chimps had earlier appeared on CBS's The Ed Sullivan Show, a Jack Benny special in 1959 and several commercials in 1960. Executive producer Robert Sparks decided to develop a series focusing on the chimpanzees after he saw them on the Benny program.

Others in the cast were Harvey Lembeck as Jerry Roper, the chimps' agent, Barbara Perry as Thelma Brockwood, Mary Grace Canfield as Amanda Allison, and Belle Montrose as Mrs. Harrison.

Ratings for the Screen Gems series were so low that ABC had largely to self-sponsor the program (although the series was sponsored on alternate weeks, throughout most of the season, by Ralston Purina). The writers included Tom Adair and James B. Allardice; story consultants were Hugh Wedlock and Howard Snyder, who co-wrote the premiere episode with Dick Wesson.

The series was broadcast on Fridays from 8 to 8:30 p.m. Eastern Time.

== Episode list ==
No.	Title	Directed by	Written by	Original release date
1	"Love Thy Neighbor"	Don Taylor	Story by : Dick Wesson; Teleplay by : Dick Wesson & Hugh Wedlock & Howard Snyder	October 6, 1961
Walter sells the house next door to a client who can't stand pets.
2	"Elinor Buys a Hat"	Unknown	Unknown	October 13, 1961
Elinor buys a hat and ends up in jail when Charlie pockets her parking ticket.
3	"Walter Takes a Partner"	Unknown	Unknown	October 20, 1961
Walter and Freddie start a synthetic soda pop business.
4	"Elinore's Guilt"	Unknown	Unknown	October 27, 1961
Elinor is stricken with remorse for having left the chimps home with a sitter while she and Walter sojourn at Palm Springs.
5	"Income Tax Rebate"	Unknown	Unknown	November 3, 1961
Walter is requested at the local office of the Internal Revenue Service to discuss deductions claimed on his "dependents".
6	"Candy's Tonsils"	Unknown	Unknown	November 10, 1961
Candy, the baby chimp, faces surgery unless she can be coaxed into taking her medicine.
7	"Trash Day"	Unknown	Unknown	November 17, 1961
Ex-newspaper thief Charlie becomes much too neighborly to Brockwoods, whose papers he's been stealing.
8	"TV or Not TV"	Richard Kinon	Herbert Finn & John Elliotte	November 24, 1961
Elinor and the chimps pinch-hit on Walter's television commercial when he becomes desert-bound.
9	"The Kids Go to School"	Richard Kinon	Ben Gershman & Leo Solomon	December 1, 1961
The chimp classmates prove popular with everyone at the day nursery—with the exception of one shocked mother.
10	"The Practical Joker"	Unknown	Unknown	December 8, 1961
Charlie borrows Elinor's purse, containing club funds, as bait in a sidewalk prank.
11	"Double Birthday Party"	Unknown	Unknown	December 15, 1961
Walter sees himself as a forgotten man on his birthday and sulks.
12	"The Hathaways Sleep Out"	Unknown	Unknown	December 22, 1961
Walter thinks Elinor has run away when she moves the paint-allergic chimps to a motel.
13	"The Jingle Contest"	Unknown	Unknown	December 29, 1961
Walter and Bert base their entry in a jungle contest on a tune that Charlie plays on the piano.
14	"Waltzing with Walter"	Unknown	Unknown	January 5, 1962
Elinor wins dancing lessons for two.
15	"Foxy Chimp"	Unknown	Unknown	January 12, 1962
Elinor takes an ailing chimp from the zoo to recuperate at her house.
16	"It's in the Cards"	Unknown	Unknown	January 19, 1962
A neighbor sees something in Charlie's cards and steers Elinor into a visit to Walter's office.
17	"The Headliners"	Unknown	Unknown	January 26, 1962
Walter is supposed to stay home for a business conference while Elinor and the Chimps board a Honolulu-bound plane for a nightclub engagement.
18	"The Paint Job"	David Butler	Hugh Wedlock & Howard Snyder	February 2, 1962
Elinor campaigns for a new color job on the family "bus".
19	"Grandma's Lamp"	Unknown	Unknown	February 9, 1962
Walter plots to get rid of Elinor's antique horror, a gift from her family.
20	"Help Wanted"	Unknown	Unknown	February 16, 1962
Elinor secretly works as a cigarette girl to buy Walter a special surprise.
21	"Swami Chimp"	Unknown	Unknown	February 23, 1962
The Hathaways' chimp act is threatened by a mind-reading rival chimp.
22	"A Man for Amanda"	Unknown	Unknown	March 2, 1962
About to lose their lovelorn housekeeper Amanda, Walter and Elinor round up some eligible mates.
23	"Pop Goes the Budget"	Unknown	Unknown	March 9, 1962
Walter encounters family opposition when he tries to enforce an economy wave.
24	"Charles Goes to the Races"	Unknown	Unknown	March 16, 1962
Beanstalk, a race horse, takes a shine to Charlie, and mopes for him on race day.
25	"Shrewd Trader"	Unknown	Unknown	March 23, 1962
The chimps pick up Elinor's knack of swapping and practice it until perfect.
26	"Elinor's Best Friend"	Unknown	Unknown	March 30, 1962
Elinor is elated when a college chum, now a wealthy world traveler, comes to visit.

== Reception ==
Latter-day television critics Castleman and Podrazik (1982) have called The Hathaways "possibly the worst series ever to air on network TV", criticizing the production, scripts, acting, the "utterly degrading" premise, and the overall "total worthlessness" of the program.
