= Suzanne Kaaren =

American actress and dancer (1912–2004)

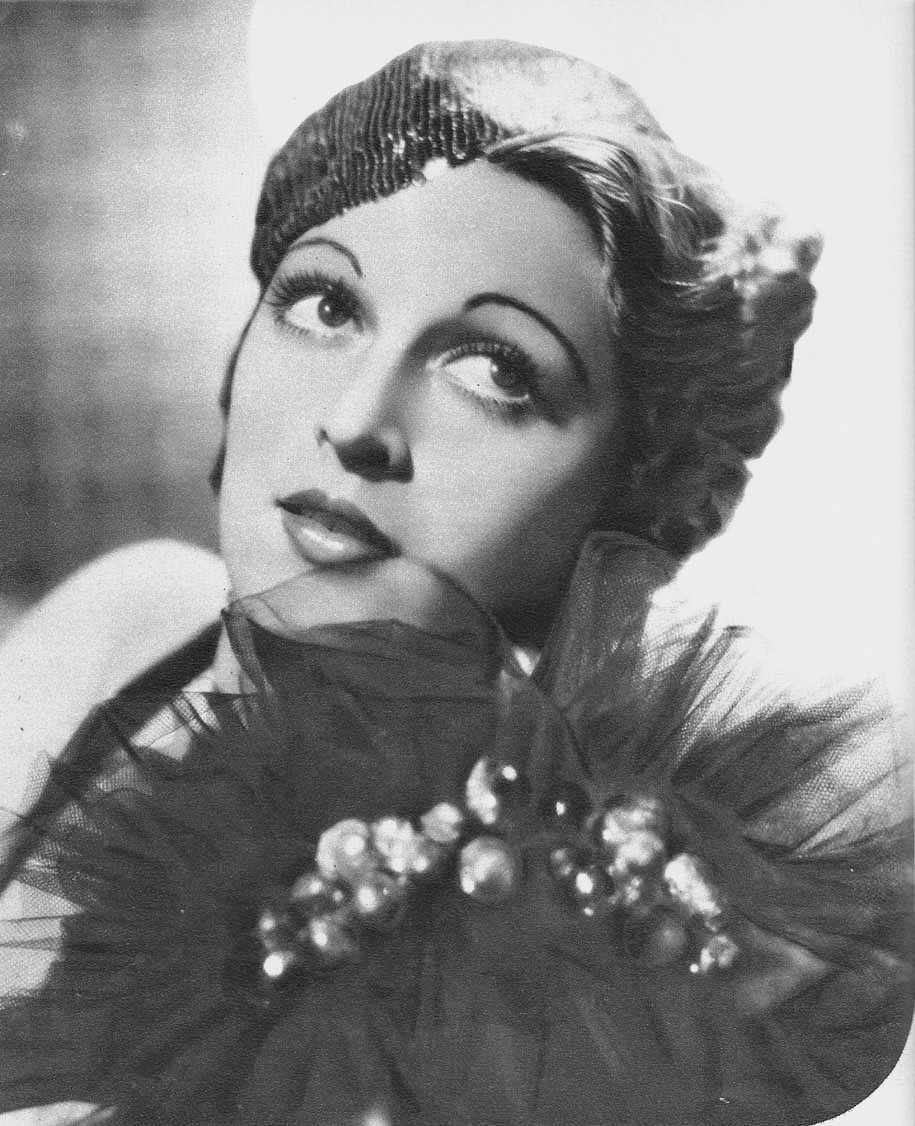
- Kaaren in 1934
- Born: March 21, 1912; Brooklyn, New York City, U.S.
- Died: August 27, 2004 (aged 92); Englewood, New Jersey, U.S.
- Resting place: Chestnut Hill Cemetery, Salisbury, North Carolina
- Education: Hunter College
- Occupations: Actress; dancer
- Years active: 1933–1984
- Spouse: Sidney Blackmer (m. 1943; died 1973)
- Children: 2

Suzanne Kaaren (March 21, 1912 – August 27, 2004) was an American B-movie actress and dancer who starred in stock film genres of the 1930s and 1940s: horror films, westerns, comedies, and romances.

== Early life ==
A native of New York City, Kaaren was born Sophie Kischnerman on March 21, 1912 in Brooklyn, New York. She attended Erasmus Hall High School and Hunter College before being signed by 20th Century Fox in September 1933. In 1931, she won the high-jump at a New York City school contest. Her parents refused to let her compete in the Olympic Games. She collected butterflies as a hobby and had several books filled with the insects.

== Career ==
=== Early career ===
She acted with stock companies and posed as a model for commercial painters and cigarette advertising. Kaaren appeared in dramatic parts in New York theaters and trained at the Hedgerow Theatre in Philadelphia, Pennsylvania.

Early on, Kaaren was a Ziegfeld Girl and later was one of the original Rockettes. She performed on stage on December 27, 1932, the night Radio City Music Hall opened.

=== Movie actress ===
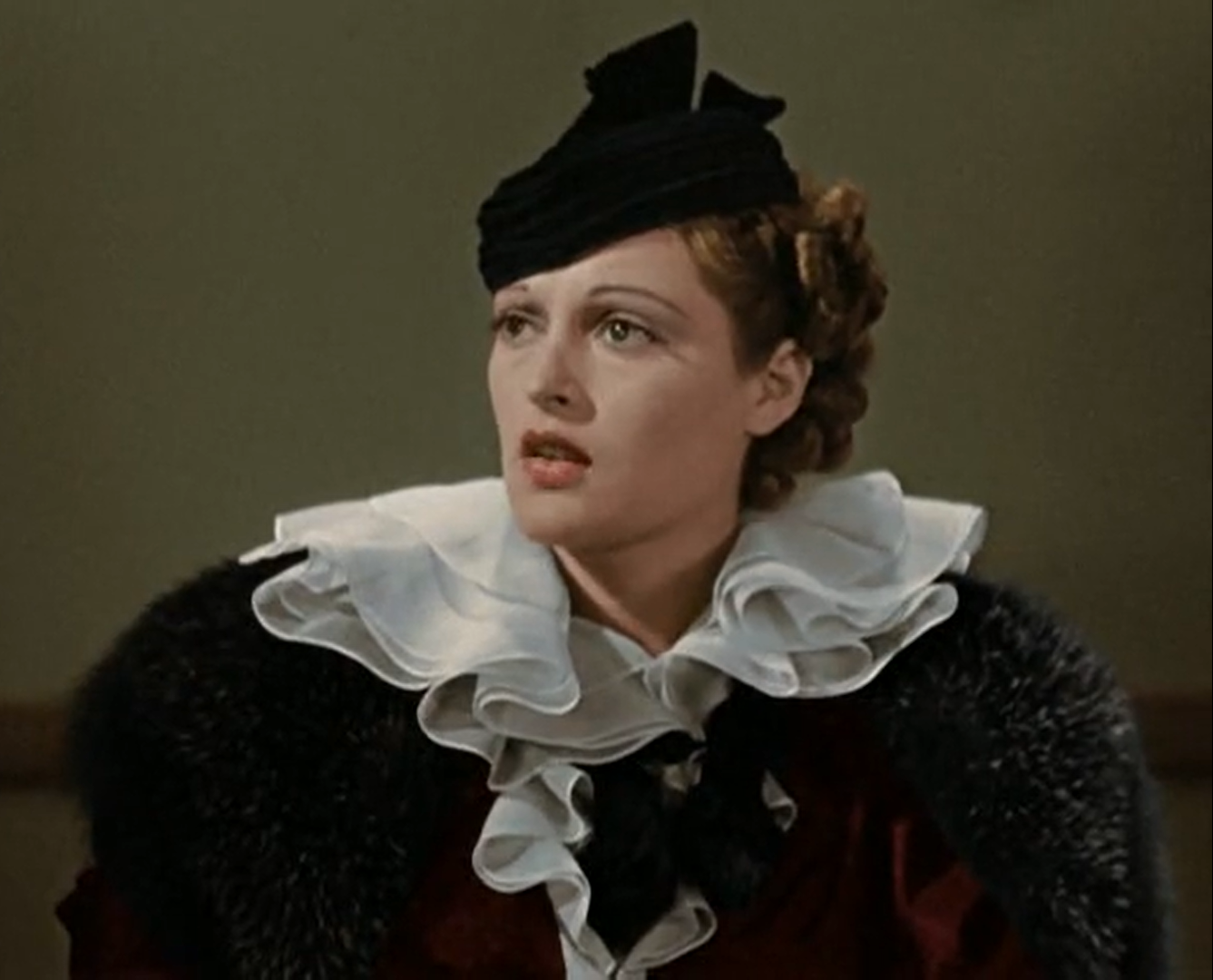
Kaaren in the Three Stooges short film Disorder in the Court, 1936

Kaaren left for Hollywood in October 1933. Her starting salary with Fox Films was $150 per week. She was eventually cast opposite Tim McCoy in Ridin' Gents, a Monogram Pictures production. She was then signed by Republic Pictures to play a character in From Rags to Riches. Ridin' Gents was filmed without either McCoy or Kaaren.

She joined a troupe assembled by producer Walter Wanger, which also included Gloria Youngblood. The theatrical company was known as Trade Winds. The comedy When's Your Birthday? (1937) showcased the zany Joe E. Brown, with Kaaren among the supporting players in an RKO Radio Pictures movie about an astrologer.

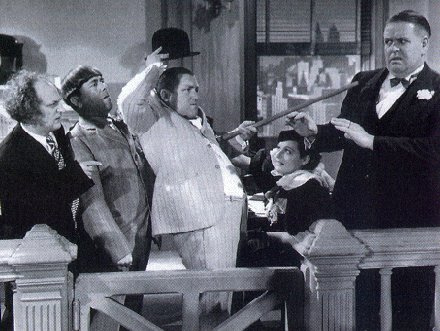
Kaaren (seated with hat) in Disorder in the Court

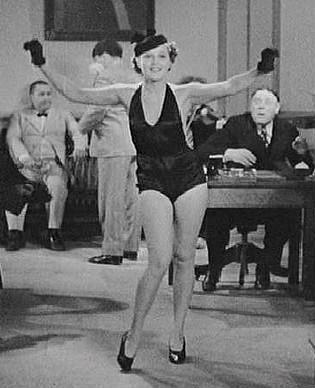
Kaaren dancing in Disorder in the Court

Kaaren figured prominently in several Three Stooges comedy short films. They are Disorder in the Court, Yes, We Have No Bonanza, and What's the Matador?.

Miracles for Sale (1939) was based on the novel Death From A Tophat by Clayton Rawson. Kaaren plays a woman who is separated into halves and then joined together again suspensefully. The murder mystery has Robert Young and Florence Rice in prominent roles.

She starred opposite Bela Lugosi in The Devil Bat. The cult film of the horror film genre is a Poverty Row production released by Producers Releasing Corporation. In the movie, Lugosi breeds giant bats to attack people.

Her final appearance on film was an uncredited role as the Duchess of Park Avenue (Manhattan) in 1984's The Cotton Club.

=== Theater ===
Kaaren stepped into the character usually played by Ann Thomas in a Broadway presentation of Chicken Every Sunday. Staged in September 1944, Thomas left the production to go to Hollywood. In July 1946, Kaaren's elder son, Brewster, was in the play with her as an eight-month-old. She was also joined by her husband, Sidney Blackmer, on stage at the Bucks County Playhouse in New Hope, Pennsylvania. In April 1953, the Blackmers starred in Glad Tidings in Atlantic City, New Jersey. A month later, the show moved to the Quarterback Theatre, also in Atlantic City.

In 1959, Kaaren appeared in The Royal Family at the Hinsdale Summer Theater in Chicago, Illinois. Linda Darnell starred; Karyn Kupcinet and Stuart Brent were also in the cast. The theme was a famous family of the American stage.

== Personal life ==
Kaaren married stage and screen actor Sidney Blackmer on June 13, 1943, in a civil ceremony in Santa Ana, California. Raquel Torres was a witness at the wedding. Blackmer was married previously to Lenore Ulric.

By this time, Kaaren was under contract to Metro-Goldwyn-Mayer. The marriage was a turbulent one from the outset. The couple separated in September 1943 and Blackmer instructed his attorney to file for divorce in October, but the couple remained together until Blackmer's death in October 1973. The marriage produced two sons, Brewster and Jonathen.

The Blackmers had lived in their family home in Salisbury, North Carolina, until it was damaged by fire in 1984. Afterward, she resided in a rent-controlled Manhattan apartment at 100 Central Park South. According to her obituary, real estate developer Donald Trump bought the building and threatened to evict all the tenants and tear it down to build something more lucrative. Kaaren's apartment was assessed at $750,000, but she refused to budge, and in 1998 a court ruled that Trump could turn the apartments into condos, but had to allow the rent-controlled tenants to remain.

== Death ==
On August 27, 2004, Kaaren died from pneumonia at the Lillian Booth Actors Home in Englewood, New Jersey, aged 92.
