= So Long Mr. Chumps =

1941 film by Jules White

- Directed by: Jules White
- Written by: Clyde Bruckman; Felix Adler
- Produced by: Jules White
- Starring: Moe Howard; Larry Fine; Curly Howard; Dorothy Appleby; John Tyrrell; Eddie Laughton; Vernon Dent; Lew Davis
- Cinematography: Barney McGill
- Edited by: Mel Thorsen
- Distributed by: Columbia Pictures
- Release date: February 7, 1941 (U.S.)
- Running time: 17:23
- Country: United States
- Language: English

So Long Mr. Chumps is a 1941 short subject directed by Jules White starring American slapstick comedy team The Three Stooges (Moe Howard, Larry Fine and Curly Howard). It is the 53rd entry in the series released by Columbia Pictures starring the comedians, who released 190 shorts for the studio between 1934 and 1959.

== Plot ==
The Stooges are incompetent but industrious street cleaners. Upon discovering a discarded envelope containing oil bonds, they dutifully return it to its rightful owner, B.O. Davis. Grateful for their integrity, Davis offers them a reward of five thousand dollars on the condition that they locate an honest individual possessing executive capabilities.

They initiate their search by leaving a wallet on the sidewalk for passersby to find, with the expectation that an honest person will reveal their integrity by returning it to them. To their chagrin, the only living being to pass their test is a dog, who returns the wallet and then guides the Stooges to an encounter with his owner. His owner is a distressed young woman who reveals that her beloved has been unjustly imprisoned. She describes him as an honest man and insists that she can prove his innocence if the Stooges will help him to escape from jail. The Stooges devise a plan to intentionally land themselves in jail.

Once incarcerated, they successfully locate the individual in question, Percy Pomeroy. The Stooges execute an escape that involves modifying their prison attire to resemble guard uniforms using black paint. However, their freedom is short-lived as they fortuitously encounter Davis, who is revealed to be "Lone Wolf" Louie, a notorious bond swindler. Consequently, both Davis and the Stooges find themselves incarcerated once more.

== Cast ==
=== Credited ===
- Moe Howard as Moe
- Larry Fine as Larry
- Curly Howard as Curly

=== Uncredited ===
- Eddie Laughton as Percy Pomeroy, Convict 41144
- Dorothy Appleby as Pomeroy's girlfriend
- John Tyrrell as B. O. Davis/Lone Wolf Louie
- Vernon Dent as desk sergeant
- Blackie Whiteford as policeman in precinct
- Bert Young as first policeman
- Louis Mason as second policeman
- George Gray as "blind" man
- Johnny Kascier as second wallet finder
- Kit Guard as Gyp DePeople
- Sam Lufkin as policeman who arrests the Stooges
- Lew Davis as laughing pedestrian
- Bruce Bennett as truck driver/prison guard at rockpile
- Lynton Brent as prison guard with painted face
- Al Morino as convict on rockpile
- Neal Burns as convict painting in prison yard
- Stanley Brown as officer in charge of B. O. Davis/Lone Wolf Louie
- Charlie Phillips as officer handcuffed to B. O. Davis/Lone Wolf Louie

== Production notes ==
So Long Mr. Chumps was filmed on July 25–30, 1940. The film title is a parody of the film Goodbye, Mr. Chips. The jail sequences were reused in Beer Barrel Polecats.

When the Stooges drop their iron balls that are chained to their legs, the sounds that are heard are again the NBC Chimes, a gag recycled from the team's 1937 short Back to the Woods.

Bud Jamison appeared in a deleted scene where he was a policeman noticing the Stooges and Pomeroy's girlfriend.

In the final scene, where Moe and Larry were breaking rocks over Curly's head, Larry picks up what seems to be a rather heavy rock. Curly notices the rock and replies, "Hey, wait a minute! That's a real one! I'm no fool." Curly then chuckles, while Larry and Moe smile. Often regarded as an unscripted moment, it was later determined that exchange was scripted in advance, as it appeared in director Jules White's final shooting script. The exchange might have started out as improv while the scene was being rehearsed.

Bruce Bennett (aka Herman Brix, a former Olympic athlete and Tarzan actor) appears in dual roles as both a truck driver and as one of the guards giving orders to the Stooges.

Laurel and Hardy had painted their prison uniforms white in 1927's The Second Hundred Years. They were also trash collectors in 1939's A Chump at Oxford.
