= Beware Spooks! =

1939 film directed by Edward Sedgwick

- Directed by: Edward Sedgwick
- Written by: Richard Flournoy (play); Albert Duffy; Brian Marlow
- Produced by: Robert Sparks
- Starring: Joe E. Brown; Mary Carlisle; Clarence Kolb
- Cinematography: Allen G. Siegler
- Edited by: James Sweeney
- Music by: Morris Stoloff
- Production company: Columbia Pictures
- Distributed by: Columbia Pictures
- Release date: October 24, 1939
- Running time: 65 minutes
- Country: United States
- Language: English

Beware Spooks! is a 1939 American comedy film directed by Edward Sedgwick and starring Joe E. Brown, Mary Carlisle and Clarence Kolb.

== Plot ==
Rookie cop Roy L. Gifford is kicked off the force after he accidentally assists a bank robbery and then lets a killer escape. Attempting to restore his reputation, he tracks down the criminals to a haunted fun house where, with his wife's assistance, he tries to bring the murderer to justice.

== Cast ==
- Joe E. Brown as Roy L. Gifford
- Mary Carlisle as Betty Lou Winters Gifford
- Clarence Kolb as Commissioner Lester Lewis
- Marc Lawrence as Slick Eastman
- Don Beddoe as Nick Bruno
- George J. Lewis as Danny Emmett
- Howard Hickman as Judge Roth
- Eddie Laughton as Dr. Johnson
- Frank M. Thomas as Capt. Wood
- Iris Meredith as Babe, Spook House Ticket Seller
- Ethelreda Leopold as Pretty Girl
- Ralph Dunn as Police Sergeant
- Robert Sterling as Bellboy
- Byron Foulger as Bank Cashier
- Walter Sande as Policeman
- Robert B. Williams as Policeman

== Bibliography ==
- Gehring, Wes D. Joe E. Brown: Film Comedian and Baseball Buffoon. McFarland, 2014.
