= What's the Matador? =

1942 American short film by Jules White

- Directed by: Jules White
- Screenplay by: Jack White; Saul Ward
- Story by: Jack White
- Produced by: Jules White
- Starring: Moe Howard; Larry Fine; Curly Howard; Suzanne Kaaren; Harry Burns; Dorothy Appleby; John Tyrrell; Cy Schindell; Eddie Laughton; Don Zelaya
- Cinematography: L. William O'Connell
- Edited by: Jerome Thoms
- Distributed by: Columbia Pictures
- Release date: April 23, 1942 (U.S.)
- Running time: 16:20
- Country: United States
- Language: English

What's the Matador? is a 1942 short subject directed by Jules White starring American slapstick comedy team The Three Stooges (Moe Howard, Larry Fine and Curly Howard). It is the 62nd entry in the series released by Columbia Pictures starring the comedians, who released 190 shorts for the studio between 1934 and 1959.

== Plot ==
The Stooges are vaudeville entertainers who travel to Mexico to perform their comedy bullfight routine, in which Curly performs the role of a brave matador, and Moe and Larry don a bull costume. En route to their performance destination, they encounter Dolores Sanchez, an enchanting señorita. They also encounter her jealous and hot-tempered husband named José who threatens to kill Curly if he ever flirts with his wife again.

The next day at the bullfighting arena, José recognizes Curly and his friends. In an act of retribution, José clandestinely arranges for the release of a live bull into the arena during the comedic enactment. Moe and Larry flee the ring, but Curly remains oblivious to the impending danger. He eventually head-butts the wild animal and is paraded out of the ring to the rousing cheers of "Olé, Americano!"

== Production notes ==
What's the Matador? was the last short filmed in 1941, shot on August 14–18 of that year. It was remade in 1959 as Sappy Bull Fighters, using minimal stock footage from the original. Footage was reused in the 1960 compilation feature film Stop! Look! and Laugh!

The film's title is a pun on the question "what's the matter?" The film itself is inspired by the popularity of the 1941 film Blood and Sand. While bullfighting is the reference, the two stories otherwise have nothing in common.

The Stooges have a frustrating exchange with an old Mexican local (Don Zelaya) when they ask if he has seen Dolores. Though his lengthy, involved, Spanish-language directions are incomprehensible to them, he actually says the following:

- "Go down the street three blocks, turn right and go two more blocks, turn right, cross the square, and turn right. Walk down that street until you find an alley, but keep walking. Go down that street until you find another alley, but do not enter that alley. Turn right. There you will find a river. Do me a favor: jump into the river and drown yourself!"

DVD Talk critic Stuart Galbraith IV noted the beginnings of Curly Howard's physical decline, observing that "one can see the earliest signs of Curly's pre-stroke personality change. It's very subtle, and while he's still quite funny, one can see little changes in his screen persona, and about here he begins to age dramatically, with lines suddenly etched deep in his face."
