= Sock-a-Bye Baby =

1942 American short film by Jules White

- Directed by: Jules White
- Written by: Clyde Bruckman
- Produced by: Jules White
- Starring: Moe Howard; Larry Fine; Curly Howard; Julie Gibson; Bud Jamison; Joyce Gardner; Clarence Straight; Fred Toones
- Cinematography: Benjamin H. Kline
- Edited by: Jerome Thoms
- Distributed by: Columbia Pictures
- Release date: November 13, 1942 (U.S.)
- Running time: 17:49
- Country: United States
- Language: English

Sock-a-Bye Baby is a 1942 short subject directed by Jules White starring American slapstick comedy team The Three Stooges (Moe Howard, Larry Fine and Curly Howard). It is the 66th entry in the series released by Columbia Pictures starring the comedians, who released 190 shorts for the studio between 1934 and 1959.

== Plot ==
The Stooges are awakened in the middle of the night by the crying of an abandoned infant left on their doorstep. They bring the baby indoors and discover a poignant letter from the distressed mother, asking the trio to provide a good home for the child, identified as baby Jimmy.

The Stooges undertake the task of nurturing the infant, providing sustenance and tender care in their makeshift role as surrogate fathers. Realizing that they do not know what babies eat, they offer him a radish, an olive, an artichoke, spaghetti, and herring. However, they become alarmed when Larry discovers a newspaper article detailing a recent child kidnapping, prompting speculation that Jimmy may indeed be the abducted child and the letter merely a ruse.

They panic when two police officers arrive at their door with the mother to reclaim the infant. Fearing arrest for kidnapping, the Stooges hide the baby and try to elude the police. Ultimately, they jump out of a window and drive away, unaware that Jimmy has stealthily accompanied them. Pursued by the police officers on motorcycles, the Stooges navigate a series of escapades before the child is safely reunited with his parents.

== Production notes ==
Filming for Sock-a-Bye Baby commenced between April 28 and May 1, 1942. The film title is a parody of the lullaby "Rock-a-bye Baby," a motif influenced by the similarly named Popeye cartoon Sock-a-Bye, Baby (1934) produced by Fleischer Studios, a precedent dating back eight years. Footage was reused in the 1960 compilation feature film Stop! Look! and Laugh!

Sock-a-Bye Baby deviates from conventional comedic tropes with its inclusion of explicit racial humor, a rarity within the Stooges' repertoire. Specifically, a scene involving Curly singing a song with derogatory references to Japanese individuals reflects the prevailing jingoistic sentiments prevalent in the media during World War II, a period characterized by heightened nationalistic fervor and xenophobic attitudes.

Sock-a-Bye Baby also features a memorable musical interlude wherein Curly, engaged in the preparation of Jimmy's meal, serenades the audience with an a cappella rendition of a whimsical song, envisioning himself as a Brazilian coffee bean: "I was a boy in Brazil and I grew on a tree. / When they shook the tree then I fell down. / Then they put me in a bag / and they fastened on a tag / and they shipped me off to New York town."
