= In the Sweet Pie and Pie =

1941 film by Jules White

- Directed by: Jules White
- Screenplay by: Clyde Bruckman
- Story by: Ewart Adamson
- Produced by: Jules White
- Starring: Moe Howard; Larry Fine; Curly Howard; Dorothy Appleby; Mary Ainslee; Ethelreda Leopold; Richard Fiske; Vernon Dent; Symona Boniface; Eddie Laughton; John Tyrrell; Geneva Mitchell
- Cinematography: George Meehan
- Edited by: Jerome Thoms
- Distributed by: Columbia Pictures
- Release date: October 16, 1941 (U.S.)
- Running time: 17:28
- Country: United States
- Language: English

In the Sweet Pie and Pie is a 1941 short subject directed by Jules White starring American slapstick comedy team The Three Stooges (Moe Howard, Larry Fine and Curly Howard). It is the 58th entry in the series released by Columbia Pictures starring the comedians, who released 190 shorts for the studio between 1934 and 1959.

== Plot ==
Tiska, Taska, and Baska Jones, three assertive society women, find themselves the recipients of a substantial inheritance contingent upon their marital status by a specified deadline. However, their intended fiancés are deployed to Honolulu with the Fleet and will not return for a few months. Advised by their astute lawyer, Diggins, the women devise a scheme to secure their inheritance by marrying three condemned inmates known as the Mushroom Murder Gang, portrayed by the Stooges. Upon marriage to the convicts, the women anticipate collecting their inheritance, following which the inmates will be executed, allowing the women to proceed with their original engagements.

The Jones sisters visit the Stooges' cell at Hang-'em-all Prison, where they introduce themselves and propose marriage. After a quick ceremony, the sisters depart, and the Stooges face an imminent execution. However, a last-minute reprieve absolves them of guilt in the Mushroom murders and secures their freedom. As the Jones sisters revel in their newfound status as widows, the Stooges unexpectedly arrive at their door, to the sisters' dismay.

Subsequently, the women endeavor to force their new husbands to conform to high society norms, believing that they will rebel against such refinement, thus providing grounds for divorce. Yet, the Stooges strive to meet the expectations imposed upon them.

The sisters arrange a social gathering where they expect the Stooges to discredit themselves. To ensure the success of their scheme, Diggins bribes their maitre d' named Williams, who is carrying a large cake to feign a stumble and hit Moe with the cake. A resulting tit-for-tat exchange soon escalates into a chaotic pie fight. When Diggins uses the opportunity to threaten annulment, the Jones sisters, along with the Stooges, retaliate against Diggins by subjecting him to a pie-filled retribution.

== Production notes ==
In the Sweet Pie and Pie was filmed between April 30 and May 3, 1941. The film makes references to several popular songs/series' of the era:

- Moe's comment "I am The Shadow" parodies the 1940 Columbia radio serial The Shadow.
- "Bill Stein," who broadcasts a "jerk-by-jerk" description of the hanging of the Mushroom Murder Mob, is a parody of real-life sportscaster Bill Stern.
- The title In the Sweet Pie and Pie is a play on the old song, "In the Sweet By and By"; the names of the sisters, Tiska, Taska, and Baska, were a play on the song, "A-Tisket, A-Tasket"; Curly's comment to Moe "I hear a rhipsody" parodies the 1940 song "I Hear a Rhapsody".
- The sisters' fiancés are named Tom, Dick and Harry, a reference to the famous phrase.

Recycled footage for In the Sweet Pie and Pie was used in:

- The dancing lesson sequence was lifted from Hoi Polloi.
- The cell block footage is later re-used in Beer Barrel Polecats.
- Several shots from the pie fight would later appear in Pest Man Wins.

In the Sweet Pie and Pie marked the final appearance of supporting actor Richard Fiske. A perfect foil for the Stooges, Fiske's promising career was cut short when he was killed in action during World War II.

=== Pie fights ===
Larry Fine recalled that the most grueling scenes in In the Sweet Pie and Pie involved pies:

Sometimes we would run out of pies, so the prop man would sweep up the pie goop off the floor, complete with nails, splinters, and tacks. Another problem was pretending you didn't know a pie was coming your way. To solve this, Jules would tell me 'Now Larry, Moe is going to smack you with a pie on the count of three.' Then Jules would tell Moe, 'Hit Larry on the count of two!' So when it came time to count, I never got to three, because Moe crowned me with a pie!
