= Idle Roomers =

Idle Roomers may refer to:

- Idle Roomers (1931 film), a 1931 comedy film directed by Fatty Arbuckle
- Idle Roomers (1944 film), a 1944 short subject starring the Three Stooges
