= Ethelreda Leopold =

American actress (1914–1998)

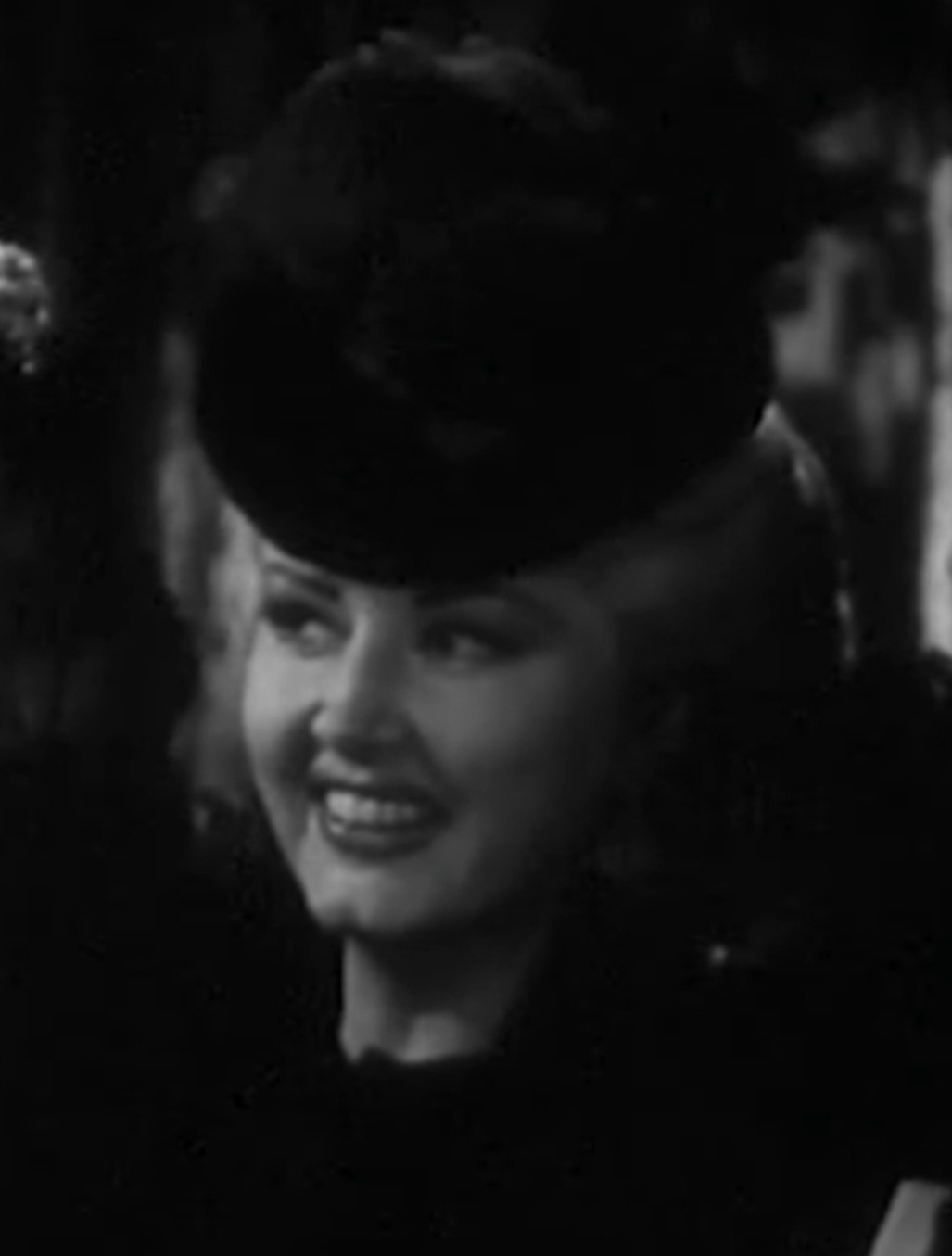
- Leopold in Bluebeard (1944)
- Born: Ethel Reda Leopold; July 2, 1914; Chicago, Illinois, U.S.
- Died: January 26, 1998 (aged 83); North Hollywood, California, U.S.
- Other name: Ethel Leopold
- Occupation: Actress
- Years active: 1934–1989
- Spouse: Joseph Pine (m. 1938; died 1986)
- Children: 1

Ethelreda Leopold (July 2, 1914 – January 26, 1998) was an American film actress. She appeared credited in approximately 65 films between 1934 and 1972. She also appeared in commercials.

Leopold is familiar to modern viewers for her roles in several Three Stooges, Andy Hardy, and Abbott and Costello films. She also had bit parts in such American classics as Angels Over Broadway and Charlie Chaplin's The Great Dictator, and supported other celebrated film comedians such as Harold Lloyd and Laurel and Hardy.

Many of her film roles were small or uncredited. She appeared at the 1990 Three Stooges convention.

== Biography ==
Leopold was from the city of Chicago and could play piano and draw. She went to St. Ignatius grammar school and Sullivan High School. Leopold studied at the Chicago Art Institute for some time before she was discovered as an actress. She began acting at age 17 after a scout for Warner Brothers saw her "modeling teen-age fashions," according to The New York Times. The first film she was in was Dames, where she was part of the chorus line. She was the winner of a "popularity contest" for the group of 109 "Busby Berkeley" girls and became part of a promotional tour after she was filmed for Gold Diggers in Paris. As part of the tour, H. Allen Smith took her vital measurements and wrote about her tour.

Leopold was married to Joseph Pine, they had a child together. She died in North Hollywood on January 26, 1998, from pneumonia.

== Filmography ==
Year	Title	Role	Notes
Broadway–Show	1934	Chorus Girl	uncredited
A Lost Day	1934	Blond Dancer	uncredited
And She Learned About Dames	1934	Student	short film, uncredited
Devil Dogs of the Air	1935	Adjutant's niece	uncredited
Gold Diggers of 1935	1935	Chorus Girl	uncredited
Hot Paprika	1935	Dr. Van Buren’s Nurse	short Film, uncredited
Half Shot Shooters	1936	Woman in Crowd	short film, uncredited
The Peppery Salt	1936	Blonde With Sailors	short film, uncredited
The Champ’s a Chump	1936	Student	short film, uncredited
A Pain in the Pullman	1936	Show Girl	short film, uncredited
My Man Godfrey	1936	Socialite	uncredited
Stage Struck	1936	Chorus Girl	uncredited
Am I Having Fun!	1936	Second Socialite	short film, uncredited
Gold Diggers of 1937	1936	Chorus girl	uncredited
Great Guy	1936	Burton's Girlfriend	uncredited
Ready, Willing and Able	1937	Blonde in Balcony at Show’s Opening	uncredited
Top of the Town	1937	Chorus Girl	uncredited
Stuck in the Sticks	1937	Woman Watching Apple Bobbing	short film
Marked Woman	1937	Dancing Club Patron	uncredited
Back to the Woods	1937	Hope	uncredited
Kid Galahad	1937	Party Guest	uncredited
From Bad to Worse	1937	Woman on Train	short film, uncredited
The Great Gambini	1937	Undetermined Role	uncredited
Goofs and Saddles	1937	Saloon Girl	short film, uncredited
Double or Nothing	1937	Nightclub Patron	uncredited
Varsity Show	1937	Chorus Girl	uncredited
Hollywood Hotel	1937	Chorus Girl	uncredited
Midnight Intruder	1938	Woman Waiting for Ship	uncredited
Wee Wee Monsieur	1938	Harem Girl	short film, uncredited
Over the Wall	1938	Scanlon's New Blonde Girlfriend	uncredited
Out Where the Stars Begin	1938	Lover in Production Number	short film, uncredited
Gold Diggers in Paris	1938	Blonde Golddigger	uncredited
The Rage of Paris	1938	Nightclub Patron	uncredited
Sweethearts	1938	Chorus Girl	uncredited
Trade Winds	1938	Ethel	uncredited
Race Suicide	1938	as Ethel Leopold	
You Can't Cheat an Honest Man	1939	Blonde at Party	uncredited
I'll Tell the World	1939	Secretary	short film
Society Lawyer	1939	Blonde in Outer Law Office	uncredited
A Star Is Shorn	1939	Hazel Hackenschmitt	short film
Rose of Washington Square	1939	Blonde Well-Wisher at Cast Party	uncredited
Trouble Finds Andy Clyde	1939		short film
The Wizard of Oz	1939	Emerald City Manicurist	uncredited
Mad Youth	1939	Blonde Secretary	uncredited
Calling All Curs	1939	Nurse	short film, uncredited
Dancing Co-Ed	1939	Flapjack Waitress	uncredited
Beware Spooks!	1939	Pretty Girl	uncredited
Andy Clyde Gets Spring Chicken	1939	Extreme Blonde at Pool	short film
A Chump at Oxford	1939	Bank Manager's Secretary	uncredited
I Take This Woman	1940	Club Patron	uncredited
Alice in Movieland	1940	Blonde Patron in Carlo’s	uncredited
The Big Premiere	1940	Irma Acacia	short film
Nutty But Nice	1940	Waitress	short film, uncredited
Andy Hardy Meets Debutante	1940	Sirocco Club Dining Extra	uncredited
What's Your 'I.Q.'?': Number Two	1940	The Average Blonde	short film, uncredited
He Stayed for Breakfast	1940	Secretary	short film, uncredited
City for Conquest	1940	Irene – Dressing Room Blonde	uncredited
Spring Parade	1940	Townswoman	uncredited
Angels Over Broadway	1940	Cigarette Girl	uncredited
The Great Dictator	1940	Blonde Secretary	uncredited
No, No, Nanette	1940		uncredited
Misbehaving Husbands	1940	Annette (model)	uncredited
Souls in Pawn	1940	The Hitch-hiker	
Six Lessons from Madame La Zonga	1941	Ship Passenger	uncredited
The Monster and the Girl	1941	Party Girl	uncredited
All the World's a Stooge	1941	Party Guest	short film, uncredited
Too Many Blondes	1941	Secretary	uncredited
Kiss the Boys Goodbye	1941		uncredited
Wide Open Town	1941	Saloon Girl	uncredited
In the Sweet Pie and Pie	1941	Baska Jones	short film
Niagara Falls	1941	Hotel Guest	uncredited
Hellzapoppin	1941	Blonde Woman at Skeet Range	uncredited
Born to Sing	1942	Audience member	uncredited
Ball of Fire	1942	Audience member	uncredited
Black Dragons	1942	Girl at Party	uncredited
A Gentleman After Dark	1942	Blonde at Train Station	uncredited
Saboteur	1942	Party Guest	uncredited
About Face	1942	Platinum Blonde in Parking Lot	short film, uncredited
My Favorite Spy	1942	Hotel Guest	uncredited
Olaf Laughs Last	1942	Girl in Restaurant	short film
Matri-Phony	1942	Miss Syracuse	short film, uncredited
Beautiful Clothes (Make Beautiful Girls)	1942	Model	short film, uncredited
The Falcon Strikes Back	1943	Hotel Guest	uncredited
Crazy House	1943	Blonde Woman Watching Radio Talent Show	short film, uncredited
Gildersleeve on Broadway	1943	Night Club Patron	uncredited
Never a Dull Moment	1943	Night Club patron	uncredited
Where Are Your Children?	1943	Girl Fighting Opal	uncredited
The Spider Woman	1943	Casino Patron	uncredited
Pistol Packin' Mama	1943	Casino Patron	uncredited
Voodoo Man	1943	Kidnapped Girl	uncredited
Trocadero	1944	Nightclub Patron	uncredited
Show Business	1944	Blonde in Kelly’s Cafe	uncredited
A Night of Adventure	1944	Nightclub Patron	uncredited
In Society	1944	Winthrop Party Guest	uncredited
Moonlight and Cactus	1944	Girl	uncredited
Bluebeard	1944	Laughing Courtroom Spectator	uncredited
Hollywood Canteen	1944	Hostess	uncredited
I'll Remember April	1945	Singer at radio station	uncredited
Earl Carroll Vanities	1945	Chorine	uncredited
Three’s a Crowd	1945	Dancer	uncredited
Crime Doctor's Warning	1945	Model	uncredited
George White's Scandals	1945	Showgirl	uncredited
Cornered	1945	Party Guest	uncredited
Deadline at Dawn	1945	Blonde Dancer	uncredited
Little Giant	1946	Information Receptionist	uncredited
A Night in Casablanca	1946	Restaurant Patron	uncredited
G.I. Wanna Home	1946	Jessie	short Film
Blue Skies	1946	Nightclub Patron	uncredited
Humoresque	1946	Party Guest	uncredited
Calendar Girl	1947	Rosie O'Grady	uncredited
The Sin of Harold Diddlebock	1947	Blonde	uncredited
A Likely Story	1947	Artist	uncredited
That's My Man	1947	Party Guest	uncredited
Lured	1947	Blonde Nightclub Singer	uncredited
Heaven Only Knows	1947	Saloon Girl	uncredited
Words and Music	1948	'On Your Toes’ Backstage Well-Wisher	uncredited
All About Eve	1950	Sarah Siddons Awards Guest	uncredited
Hit Parade of 1951	1950	Woman at dice table	uncredited
The Abbott and Costello Show	1953	Blonde Housewife	TV series, uncredited
Hazel	1963	Fundraiser Guest	TV series, uncredited
The Killers	1964	Club Patron	uncredited
The Disorderly Orderly	1964	Patient	uncredited
Bonanza	1964–1965	Party Guest / Show Spectator	TV series, uncredited
Two on a Guillotine	1965	Theatre Audience Member	uncredited
Marriage on the Rocks	1965	Club Patron	uncredited
Harum Scarum	1964	Premier Guest	uncredited
Batman	1966	Observer Outside Club	TV series, uncredited
The Oscar	1966	Club Patron	uncredited
Way... Way Out	1966	Mrs. Soblova	uncredited
The Man from U.N.C.L.E.	1966	Campaign Worker	TV series, uncredited
The Monkees	1966	Customer	TV series, uncredited
Fitzwilly	1966	Wedding Guest	TV series, uncredited
Hillbillys in a Haunted House	1967	Audience Member	uncredited
That Girl	1967–1968	Party Guest / Restaurant Patron	TV series, uncredited
Bewitched	1967–1969	Restaurant Patron / Country Club Guest	TV series, uncredited
The Andy Griffith Show	1968	Restaurant Patron	TV series, uncredited
Funny Girl	1968	Audience Member	uncredited
Family Affair	1968	Guest	TV series, uncredited
I Love You, Alice B. Toklas!	1968	Mourner	uncredited
Hellfighters	1968	Restaurant Patron	uncredited
It Takes a Thief	1968	Guest / Party Guest	TV series, uncredited
Myra Breckinridge	1970	Bridge Party Guest	uncredited
McCloud	1970	Party Guest	TV series, uncredited
The Bold Ones: The Senator	1970	Party Guest	TV series, uncredited
The Mephisto Waltz	1971	Party Guest	uncredited
Gunsmoke	1971	Townswoman	TV series, uncredited
The Partridge Family	1971–1974	Speech Spectator / Audience Member / Townswoman	TV series, uncredited
Columbo	1971–1974	Exhibit Patron / Party Guest / Theatre Patron	TV series, uncredited
Gidget Gets Married	1972	Office Worker	uncredited
Mary Tyler Moore	1972	Woman	TV series
Banacek	1973	Restaurant Patron	TV series, uncredited
The Magician	1974	Benefit Guest	TV series, uncredited
McMillan & Wife	1974	Club Patron	TV series, uncredited
The Snoop Sisters	1974	Film Festival Attendee	TV series, uncredited
Rhoda	1974	Passenger	TV series, uncredited
Young Frankenstein	1974	Theatre Goer	uncredited
Charlie's Angels	1977–1978	Interview Spectator / Auction Guest / Society Member	TV series, uncredited
The Rockford Files	1979	Party Guest	TV series, uncredited
The Waltons	1981	Party Guest	TV series, uncredited
The Star Chamber	1983	Party Guest	uncredited
Dynasty	1981–1986	Juror / Party Guest	TV series, uncredited
The A Team	1983	Helen, Old Woman in Cab	TV series, uncredited
Hart to Hart	1983	Bidder #1	TV series, uncredited
Murder, She Wrote	1984–1989	Party Guest	TV series, uncredited
Life with Lucy	1986	Wedding Guest	TV series, uncredited
Married... with Children	1989	Restaurant Patron	TV series, uncredited
