= Barbara Perry (actress) =

American actress (1921-2019)

- Barbara Perry in The Andy Griffith Show (1963)
- Born: June 22, 1921; Norfolk, Virginia, U.S.
- Died: May 5, 2019 (aged 97); Los Angeles, California, U.S.
- Occupations: Actress, singer, dancer
- Years active: 1933–2017
- Spouses: Bennett Warren James (m. 1953; div. 1965) Art Babbitt (m. 1967; died 1992)
- Children: 1

Barbara Perry (June 22, 1921 – May 5, 2019) was an American actress, singer and dancer who worked for 84 years in Hollywood and on Broadway.

== Career ==
Norfolk, Virginia-born Perry began her film career in 1933, when she appeared in Counsellor at Law. She also had a small part in The Mystery of Edwin Drood in 1935. She performed on Broadway in various productions, including playing Anna in Rumple in 1957. In 1950 she was Mrs. Larry in Happy as Larry on Broadway.

By the mid-1950s to the early-1960s, she had studied acting at the Royal Academy of Dramatic Art in London, England, while performing opposite George Formby, Warde Donovan, and Sara Gregory in Zip Goes a Million at the Hippodrome and Palace Theatres, and upon her return to the USA had started appearing in numerous television series such as Perry Mason,The Donna Reed Show, The Andy Griffith Show, My Three Sons, and The Dick Van Dyke Show, where she played Buddy Sorrell's wife Pickles, before being replaced by Joan Shawlee.

In 1981, Perry wrote and performed in Passionate Ladies, a one-woman Broadway show at the Bijou Theatre. Her other Broadway plays included Swan Song (1946), If the Shoe Fits (1946), Happy as Larry (1950), and Rumple (1957). She also played Thelma Brockwood on The Hathaways. Perry's last known role was in the television series Baskets in 2017, meaning that her film/television career spanned extraordinary 84 years.

== Personal life ==
Perry was first married to Bennett Warren James, with whom she had a daughter, from 1953–1965. The union ended in divorce. Her second marriage was to animator Art Babbitt on April 14, 1967, in Hollywood, California, until his death in 1992. They had no children.

== Death ==
Barbara Perry died on May 5, 2019, in Los Angeles at the age of 97.

== Filmography ==
=== Film ===
Year	Film	Role	Notes
1933	Counsellor at Law	Dorothy Dwight	
1935	The Mystery of Edwin Drood	Schoolgirl	Uncredited
1944	Hi, Beautiful	Specialty dancer	Uncredited
1945	An Angel Comes to Brooklyn	Barbara	
1949	I Was a Male War Bride	Tall WAC	
1960	From the Terrace	Blonde	Uncredited
1962	Period of Adjustment	Cherylynn Anderson	Uncredited
1963	Shock Corridor		Uncredited
1964	The Naked Kiss	Edna	
1965	Mirage	Dr. Broden's Receptionist	Uncredited
1971	Thief	Mrs. Risman	Television film
1973	Tom	Jim's Mother	
1978	Operation Room		Television film
1980	Marilyn: The Untold Story		Television film
1983	I Take These Men	Professor Ann Bromfield	Television film
1984	Trancers	Mrs. Santa Claus	
1989	Trust Me	Severe Woman	
1989	Tap	Milly	
1989	Wedding Band	Margot	
1990	Polly Comin' Home!	Mrs. Clayton	
1991	Father of the Bride	Female Factory Worker	
1993	Double Deception	Lil Paxton	
1997	Just Write	Mildred	
2007	Mr. Woodcock	Old Woman	
2010	The Back-up Plan	Wedding Singer	
2011	Let Go	Sweet Old Lady	
2012	The Tango Singer	Bertha Gardes	
2015	Everybody Does It	Grandma	
2017	The Extra	Herself	

=== Television ===
Year	Title	Role	Notes
1948	Rooftop Rendezvous	Herself	Season 1, Ep. 5
1955	The Pepsi-Cola Playhouse	Herself	1 episode
1957	The Ed Sullivan Show	Herself	Season 11, Ep. 12
1959	The Thin Man	Binky	1 episode
1959	The Life and Legend of Wyatt Earp	Phronsie LaTour	1 episode
1960	The Twilight Zone	Blonde Woman	Episode: The Chaser
1960	The Jim Backus Show	Lollypop	1 episode
1960	The Donna Reed Show	Buffie	Season 3 - Episode 13
1961	Thriller	Babs Dawson	1 episode
1961-1962	The Dick Van Dyke Show	Pickles Sorrell	2 episodes
1961-1962	The Hathaways	Thelma Brockwood / Thelma Blackwood	6 episodes
1962	Pete and Gladys	Betty / Carol	2 episodes
1963	The Joey Bishop Show	Shopper	Episode: Two Little Maids Are We
1963-1966	The Andy Griffith Show	Floss / Doris Williams / Lavinia / Mary Lee Becktel	4 episodes
1964-1972	My Three Sons	Mrs. Thompson / Mrs. Hoover	3 episodes
1964	The Fugitive	Woman in hall	Episode: Rat in a Corner
1964	The Farmer's Daughter	Connie	Episode: The Turkish Delight
1964	Arrest and Trial	Clara	Episode: Those Which Love Has Made
1964	The Cara Williams Show	Miss Bertrand	Episode: The Wedding Rehearsal
1965	My Favorite Martian	Miss Hotchkiss	Episode: Martin of the Movies
1965-1966	Perry Mason	Girl Assistant / Beauty Operator	2 episodes
1966	The Lucy Show	Blonde Customer / The Housewife	2 episodes
1966	Family Affair	Bess Melville	Episode: Buffy
1966	Daniel Boone	Lydia Dorsey	Episode: The Loser's Race
1967	Gomer Pyle, U.S.M.C.	Den Mother	Episode: Gomer, the Good Samaritan
1968	Bewitched	Mrs. Bentley / Mrs. MacLane	2 episodes
1970	Room 222	Pearl	Episode: The Whole World Can Hear You
1970	The Bill Cosby Show	Mrs. Perry	Episode: Open House
1971	Adam-12	Wilma Engles	Episode: Log 26: LEMRAS
1973	Needles and Pins	Mrs. Martindale	Episode: It Was a Very Good Line
1975	Joe and Sons	Theresa	Episode: Joe's Date
1980	Barnaby Jones	Mitzi	Episode: The Final Victim
1982	Trapper John, M.D.	Registrar	Episode: Doctors and Other Strangers
1982	Benson	Mary Colton	Episode: Mary and Her Lambs
1983	St. Elsewhere	Dietician	Episode: Rain
1984	The Duck Factory	Aunt Pauline	Episode: The Annies
1984	Newhart	Tourist	Episode: Tickets, Please
1989	Quantum Leap	Theora Beaman	Episode: Good Morning, Peoria - September 9, 1959
1989	The Magical World of Disney	Woman	Episode: Polly
1989	Dallas	Ms. Perkins	Episode: Sex, Lies and Videotape
1989	Murder, She Wrote	Party Guest	Episode: Town Father
1990	Murphy Brown	Secretary #39	Episode: The Last Laugh
1992	Parker Lewis Can't Lose	Auntie Em	Episode: Civil Wars
1992	Married... with Children	Old Lady	Episode: Psychic Avengers
1997	Alright Already	Lillian	Episode: Again with the Funeral
2000	Beyond Belief: Fact or Fiction		1 episode
2003	The Guardian	Woman	Episode: Carnival
2009	The Unit	Old Woman	Episode: The Last Nazi
2009-2014	How I Met Your Mother	Mrs. Douglas	2 episodes
2011	Perfect Couples	Aunt Bertha	Episode: Perfect Wedding
2013	Work It	Elderly Woman #1	Episode: My So-Called Mid-Life Crisis
2014	Review		Episode: Making a Sex Tape; Being a Racist; Hunting
2017	Baskets	Gift Shop Employee	Episode: Ronald Reagan Library
