= Jerome Thoms =

American film editor (1907–1977)

- Born: October 7, 1907; Baltimore, Maryland, U.S.
- Died: November 1, 1977 (aged 70); Fredericksburg, Texas, U.S.
- Occupation: Film editor

Jerome Thoms (October 7, 1907 – November 1, 1977) was an American film editor.

== Career ==
He edited Blondie's Big Moment (1947), Blondie's Holiday (1947), The Chance of a Lifetime (1943), A Close Call for Boston Blackie (1946), The Devil's Mask (1946), The Crimson Kimono (1959), Underworld USA (1960), Shock Corridor (1963), The Naked Kiss (1964), West of Sonora (1948), and So Dark the Night (1946). He also edited What Makes Lizzy Dizzy? (1942) and Tireman, Spare my Tires (1942). In Screaming Mimi (1958) he worked with Gene Havlick.

Jerome Thoms' editing in The Crimson Kimono adds a percussive force to many of the action scenes.

He worked as art director in Escape in the Fog (1945).

== Selected filmography ==
- The Sea Bat (1930)
- In the Sweet Pie and Pie (1941)
- She's Oil Mine (1941)
- What's the Matador? (1942)
- Three Smart Saps (1942)
- Sock-a-Bye Baby (1942)
- Dizzy Detectives (1943)
- Two Señoritas from Chicago (1943)
- Frontier Fury (1943)
- Dangerous Blondes (1943)
- Swing Out the Blues (1944)
- Life with Blondie (1945)
- The Devil's Mask (1946)
- Blondie's Big Moment (1947)
- My Dog Rusty (1948)
- Thunderhoof (1948)
- The Crime Doctor's Diary (1949)
- The Good Humor Man (1950)
- Corky of Gasoline Alley (1951)
- Her First Romance (1951)
- Okinawa (1952)
- Flame of Calcutta (1953)
- Gun Fury (1953)
- The Violent Men (1955)
- Apache Ambush (1955)
- The Harder They Fall (1956)
- Reprisal! (1956)
- Battle Stations (1956)
- Hellcats of the Navy (1957)
- Jeanne Eagels (1957)
- Pal Joey (1957)
- Screaming Mimi (1958)
- Gunman's Walk (1958)
- The 7th Voyage of Sinbad (1958)
- Good Day for a Hanging (1959)
- Ride Lonesome (1959)
- Edge of Eternity (1959)
- The Boy and the Pirates (1960)
- Stop! Look! and Laugh (1960)
- Underworld U.S.A. (1961)
- Twist Around the Clock (1961)
- The Wild Westerners (1962)
- Don't Knock the Twist (1962)
- The Interns (1962)
- Shock Corridor (1963)
- Showdown (1963)
- The Naked Kiss (1964)

== Academy Awards ==
- 30th Academy Awards-Nominated for Pal Joey and shared with Viola Lawrence. Lost to The Bridge on the River Kwai.

== Bibliography ==
- Blottner, Gene (22 December 2011). Columbia Pictures Movie Series, 1926–1955: The Harry Cohn Years. McFarland Publishing. p. 363. ISBN 9780786486724.
- Peary, Gerald (30 May 2012). Samuel Fuller: Interviews. Univ. Press of Mississippi. p. 135. ISBN 9781617033070.
