= Sappy Bull Fighters =

1959 American short film by Jules White

- Directed by: Jules White
- Written by: Jack White
- Produced by: Jules White
- Starring: Moe Howard; Larry Fine; Joe Besser; Greta Thyssen; George J. Lewis; Joe Palma; Manuel Granada
- Cinematography: Irving Lippman
- Edited by: Harold White
- Distributed by: Columbia Pictures
- Release date: June 4, 1959 (U.S.)
- Running time: 15:12
- Country: United States
- Language: English

Sappy Bull Fighters is a 1959 short subject directed by Jules White starring American slapstick comedy team The Three Stooges (Moe Howard, Larry Fine, and Joe Besser in his final starring role). It is the 190th and final entry in the series released by Columbia Pictures starring the comedians between 1934 and 1959.

== Plot ==
The Stooges, renowned vaudeville performers, embark on a journey to Mexico to present their comedic burlesque rendition of a bullfight. In this farcical spectacle, Joe assumes the role of the intrepid matador, while Moe and Larry don a bull costume, embodying the role of the formidable bovine adversary. However, upon their arrival, they are confronted with the disheartening news of their performance cancellation, purportedly due to their refusal to comply with the manager's demand for additional unpaid shows. Stranded in a foreign land without financial means to return home, the trio faces a precarious predicament.

Fortuitously, their plight garners the sympathy of the gracious señorita Greta, who extends them an opportunity to showcase their talents at the local bullring. However, amidst the ensuing chaos, a misunderstanding ensues, leading to an inadvertent exchange of belongings, with Greta inadvertently departing with the Stooges' suitcase. Complications escalate when Joe's innocent gestures of gratitude toward Greta provoke the ire of her excessively jealous husband, José.

The following day, as the Stooges execute their act with aplomb at the bullring, they unwittingly incur the wrath of José, who orchestrates a vengeful reprisal. Consequently, a live bull is unleashed into the arena, triggering a frenzied flight for safety by Moe and Larry. Oblivious to the danger, Joe confronts the raging beast head-on, inadvertently confronting the live bull. Nonetheless, Joe's inadvertent bravado earns him the admiration of the spectators, who acclaim him with fervent cries of "¡Ole, Americano!" as he is triumphantly escorted from the arena.

== Cast ==
=== Credited ===
- Moe Howard as Moe
- Larry Fine as Larry
- Joe Besser as Joe
- Greta Thyssen as Greta
- George J. Lewis as José

=== Uncredited ===
- Joe Palma as bullring attendant and spectator
- Charles Cross as spectator and stagehand
- Cy Schindell and Eddie Laughton as bullring attendants (stock footage)
- Manuel Granada as bullfight announcer (stock footage)

The ThreeStooges.net website claims that a young Mary Tyler Moore appeared in an uncredited bit part.

== Production notes ==
Sappy Bull Fighters is a reworking of 1942's What's the Matador?, a parody of the 1941 film Blood and Sand. Minimal recycled footage from the original was used, including long shots and voice tracks of Curly Howard riding the bull. The film begins with an inside joke: an advertising poster promotes the Stooges, and the bottom of the poster lists another performer, one "Julio Blanco" (the Spanish approximation of producer-director Jules White).

The remake was filmed over two days in mid-1957 (July 15–16, 1957), and marks Joe Besser's screen farewell as a Stooge: it was the last Stooge short produced for and released to theaters. The films Besser made with the Stooges were released out of sequence. The last short in which Besser worked was actually Flying Saucer Daffy, filmed in December 1957. After this last film was finished, Besser left the act to tend to his ailing wife. Besser would be succeeded by fellow Columbia two-reel comedian Joe DeRita (as "Curly Joe") in the trio's subsequent projects.

By the time Sappy Bull Fighters was released in June 1959, the Stooges were experiencing a rebirth in popularity, due to the release of their shorts on television. In essence, the theatrical release of Sappy Bull Fighters actually competed with the enormously successful television revival.

At 15:12 Sappy Bull Fighters is the shortest film the team made at Columbia Pictures. The longest is A Pain in the Pullman (1936) at 19:46.
