= Back to the Woods (1937 film) =

1937 American short film by Preston Black

- Directed by: Preston Black
- Screenplay by: Andrew Bennison
- Story by: Searle Kramer
- Produced by: Jules White
- Starring: Moe Howard; Larry Fine; Curly Howard; Murdock MacQuarrie; Bud Jamison; Vernon Dent; Ethelreda Leopold; Harlene Wood; Cy Schindell; Ted Lorch
- Cinematography: George Meehan
- Edited by: Charles Nelson
- Distributed by: Columbia Pictures
- Release date: May 14, 1937 (U.S.)
- Running time: 19:27
- Country: United States
- Language: English

Back to the Woods is a 1937 short subject directed by Preston Black starring American slapstick comedy team The Three Stooges (Moe Howard, Larry Fine and Curly Howard). It is the 23rd entry in the series released by Columbia Pictures starring the comedians, who released 190 shorts for the studio between 1934 and 1959.

== Plot ==
Set in nascent American colonies, the Stooges, cast as convicted felons expelled from England to embark on a series of misadventures upon their arrival. Their initial encounter involves a lively dance with the governor's daughters, followed by the disheartening revelation that the colonists face starvation due to the local indigenous population's refusal to grant access to hunting grounds without a hefty fee.

Undeterred by the predicament, the Stooges resolve to aid the struggling colony by venturing into the wilderness for a hunting excursion. Donning makeshift coonskin caps, with Curly sporting an unconventional skunk hat, the trio ventures outside Plymouth, Massachusetts, armed with blunderbusses in pursuit of game. A fortuitous discharge by Curly's firearm secures them a turkey, buoying their spirits for the task ahead.

However, a fateful misjudgment leads them to mistake a gathering of indigenous individuals adorned in ceremonial headdresses for a flock of turkeys. Their ill-conceived volley of shots provokes the ire of the indigenous group, precipitating a frantic chase. Despite their adversaries' pursuit, the Stooges concoct a series of improvised defenses, employing a tree branch catapult to repel their assailants with an assortment of projectiles.

Amidst the chaos, Larry finds himself ensnared and threatened with scalping, prompting Curly and Moe to orchestrate a daring rescue. Employing unconventional tactics involving hot coals and swift physical retribution, they manage to extricate their comrade from peril. Their escape, facilitated by a makeshift canoe, culminates in a comical resurgence of their adversaries, revitalized by an inadvertent dousing with water.

== Cast ==
=== Credited ===
- Moe Howard as Moe
- Larry Fine as Larry
- Curly Howard as Curly

=== Uncredited ===
- Murdock MacQuarrie as Judge
- Bud Jamison as Prosecutor
- William Irving as Courtroom Guard
- Harlene Wood as Faith
- Ethelreda Leopold as Hope
- Beatrice Curtis as Charity
- Vernon Dent as Governor
- John Rand as Governor's Aide
- Ted Lorch as Chief Rain in the Puss
- Cy Schindell as Indian
- Bert Young as Indian
- Charles Dorety as Indian
- Budd Fine as Indian
- Sam Lufkin as Indian
- Charlie Phillips as Indian
- Blackie Whiteford as Indian

== Production notes ==
Back to the Woods is the last Stooges' films directed by "Preston Black", pseudonym of Jules White's older brother and fellow producer/director Jack White. It is the second-longest Stooge short filmed, running at 19' 27"; the longest is A Pain in the Pullman, clocking in at 19' 46". Filming was completed on March 2–6, 1937.

Near the beginning of Back to the Woods when the Stooges are prisoners, each Stooge drops the metal ball that is being used to restrain him, in succession. When each ball hits the ground, a chime rings. The notes are the G-E-C chime sequence that was (and still is) the same as the NBC Chimes used for NBC radio and later NBC television. This is followed by Curly imitating a radio announcer. The "NBC chimes" gag would eventually be recycled in the team's 1941 short So Long Mr. Chumps.

Larry refers to the WPA, which he identifies as the "Willing Pilgrims Association". This is a reference to the Works Progress Administration, a New Deal program that was prominent in the 1930s.

Curly and Larry refer to Whopper and Rosemont, two popular racehorses of the era.

The shot of the Stooges leaving in their high speed canoe was recycled from Whoops, I'm an Indian!. Back to the Woods was the first Stooge film to employ stock footage, a practice that would become more common in future productions.
