= Disorder in the Court =

1936 American short film starring the Three Stooges

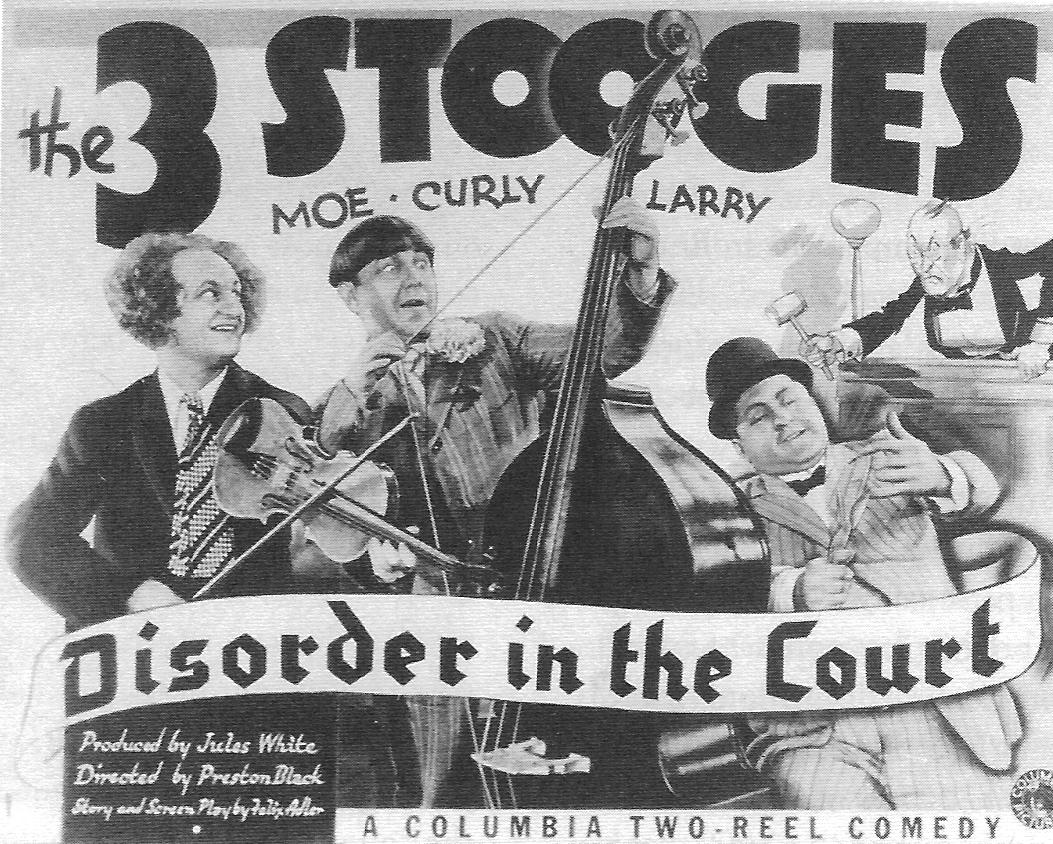
- Directed by: Preston Black
- Written by: Felix Adler
- Produced by: Jules White
- Starring: Moe Howard; Larry Fine; Curly Howard; Bud Jamison; Harry Semels; Suzanne Kaaren; James C. Morton; Edward LeSaint; Sol Horwitz; Al Thompson; Eddie Laughton
- Cinematography: Benjamin H. Kline
- Edited by: William A. Lyon
- Distributed by: Columbia Pictures
- Release date: May 30, 1936 (U.S.)
- Running time: 16:37
- Country: United States
- Language: English

Disorder in the Court is a 1936 short film directed by Preston Black starring American slapstick comedy team The Three Stooges (Moe Howard, Larry Fine and Curly Howard). It is the 15th entry in the series released by Columbia Pictures starring the comedians, who released 190 shorts for the studio between 1934 and 1959.

== Plot ==
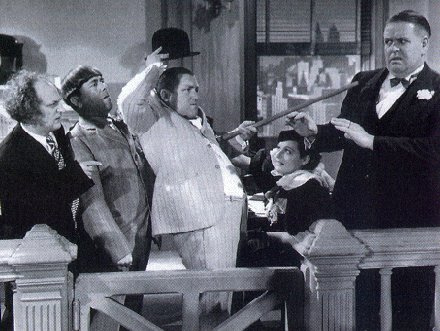
The Stooges harass defense attorney Bud Jamison in Disorder in the Court

Disorder in the Court (1936)

The Stooges, musicians by profession, are key witnesses at a murder trial where, Gail Tempest, a showgirl from their nightclub, stands accused of murdering Kirk Robin. Despite being pivotal witnesses, the Stooges are initially absent, preoccupied with leisurely activities, namely playing Jacks. Eventually, Curly takes the stand and recounts the events, ultimately offering a musical interlude with Larry on violin, Moe on harmonica, and Curly on both spoons and upright bass to illustrate the night of the crime.

However, the courtroom is thrown into chaos when Larry mistakenly identifies the court clerk's toupee as a tarantula, prompting Moe to discharge the guard's firearm. After the confusion, Moe and Curly enact the purported murder. Further antics lead to the discovery of a parrot carrying a confession from the true culprit, Buck Wing.

With Tempest's innocence established, the proceedings conclude amidst a comedic mishap involving a ruptured fire hose.

== Cast ==
=== Credited ===
- Moe Howard as Moe
- Larry Fine as Larry
- Curly Howard as Curly

=== Uncredited ===
- Bud Jamison as Defense Attorney
- Harry Semels as District Attorney
- Suzanne Kaaren as Gail Tempest
- James C. Morton as Court clerk
- Edward LeSaint as Judge
- Al Thompson as Bailiff
- Eddie Laughton as Co-Counsel
- Johnny Kascier as Court recorder
- Alice Belcher as Flirting juror
- Solomon Horwitz as Gallery spectator
- Harold Kening as Gallery spectator
- Bobby Barber as Gallery spectator
- Bobby Burns as Gallery spectator
- Sam Lufkin as Gallery spectator
- Arthur Thalasso as Tall man in Hallway

== Production notes ==
Disorder in the Court was filmed over six days on April 1–6, 1936. The film title is a play on the stereotypical judge's cry, "Order in the court!"

A colorized version of this film was released in 2006 as part of the DVD collection "Stooges on the Run."

The two Howard brothers' real life father Sol Horwitz, (the father of Moe, Curly, and Shemp Howard), makes an uncredited appearance as a member of the public audience.

This is the first Stooges short in which Curly is spelled "C-U-R-L-Y" in the opening titles instead of the previous "C-U-R-L-E-Y." The title card also has the Stooges inverted reading from left to right, Curly-Larry-Moe, as opposed to Moe-Larry-Curly in previous shorts, effectively giving Curly "top billing." This change in the title card coincides with the refined and more familiar Columbia Pictures image of a torch-bearing woman, with a shimmering light instead of the primitive animation of light rays in the previous version. In addition, the "Columbia" theme now uses a more upbeat theme, featuring a brass introduction.

The "Vici kid" mentioned by Curly is a brand of kid leather, "vici" being Latin for "I have conquered".

== Copyright status ==
Disorder in the Court is one of four Columbia Stooges shorts that fell into the public domain after the copyright expired in 1964, the other three being Malice in the Palace (1949), Sing a Song of Six Pants and Brideless Groom (both 1947). Consequently, these four shorts frequently appear on budget video compilations and streaming services. A remastered version of the film was released on Blu-ray as part of The Three Stooges Collection on August 13, 2024, by Sony Pictures Home Entertainment.

== In popular culture ==
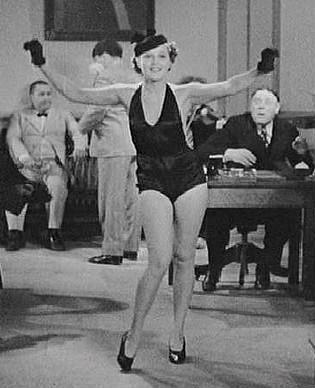
Gail Tempest (Suzanne Kaaren) dancing in the courtroom.

The presumed perpetrator is a dancer named Buck Wing, a reference to the buck-and-wing dance common in vaudeville and minstrel shows.

The classic "swearing in" routine ("Take off your hat!"; "Raise your right hand"; "Judgy Wudgy") was borrowed nearly verbatim from Buster Keaton's 1931 film Sidewalks of New York, directed by Stooges producer Jules White.

A shot of the trio performing in court was used by Hershey's in a 1980s advertising campaign.

A still from it is used in the episode "Self-Inflicted Wounds (Part 1): Could'a, Would'a, Should'a" of Farscape while part of the film is being played in the next episode "Self-Inflicted Wounds (Part 2): Wait for the Wheel".

The short appears in the 2019 horror film 3 from Hell.

The short appears in full in the 2024 video game Vampire Therapist

== See also ==
- Public domain film
- List of American films of 1936
- List of films in the public domain in the United States
