= Busy Buddies (film) =

1944 film by Del Lord

- Directed by: Del Lord
- Written by: Del Lord; Elwood Ullman
- Produced by: Hugh McCollum
- Starring: Moe Howard; Larry Fine; Curly Howard; Vernon Dent; Fred Kelsey; Eddie Laughton; John Tyrrell
- Cinematography: George Meehan
- Edited by: Henry Batista
- Distributed by: Columbia Pictures
- Release date: March 18, 1944 (U.S.)
- Running time: 16:46
- Country: United States
- Language: English

Busy Buddies is a 1944 short subject directed by Del Lord starring American slapstick comedy team The Three Stooges (Moe Howard, Larry Fine and Curly Howard). It is the 78th entry in the series released by Columbia Pictures starring the comedians, who released 190 shorts for the studio between 1934 and 1959.

== Plot ==
The Stooges, proprietors of the Jive Cafe, find themselves grappling with significant financial indebtedness. In a bid to alleviate their financial woes, they reluctantly undertake a secondary occupation, affixing posters for a modest remuneration of one penny per poster. Their attention is captivated by a particular poster advertising a lucrative cow milking competition promising a grand prize of $100.

Promptly seizing the opportunity, Moe and Larry nominate Curly as their representative for the contest and embark on a quest to procure a bovine specimen for practice. Serendipitously, they encounter what they believe to be a cow behind a nearby fence, though it transpires to be a bull. Curly's attempts at milking the bovine prove futile, as he is promptly ejected over a fence on two occasions and later propelled onto a nearby telephone pole.

On the day of the competition, Curly (dubbed "K. O. Bossy"), finds himself unable to extract even a single drop of milk from the cow's udder. Desperate to salvage the situation, Moe and Larry devise a ruse involving them donning a cow costume while concealing a jug of milk. Their subterfuge appears successful until Curly inadvertently removes the mock udder, resulting in a torrent of milk cascading forth and ultimately leading to his disqualification. Subsequently, during a tumultuous altercation with the contest's victor, the Stooges are unceremoniously ejected from the stage, amid the disapproving jeers of the audience, having been exposed for their attempted deception.

== Production notes ==
Busy Buddies was filmed on November 1–5, 1943. The film title is a play on the term "busybodies."

=== Curly Howard fades ===
By the latter part of 1943, the team had engaged in a ceaseless series of public engagements in aid of the war endeavor. The rigorous itinerary commenced exerting its effects notably on Curly, whose visage, characterized by juvenile attributes, began manifesting signs of fatigue. Notably, Curly had reached the age of 40 on October 22, 1943.

== See also ==
- List of American films of 1944
