= Stand By All Networks =

1942 film

Stand by All Networks
- Directed by: Lew Landers
- Written by: Doris Malloy; Robert Lee Johnson; Maurice Tombragel
- Produced by: Jack Fier
- Starring: Florence Rice; John Beal; Margaret Hayes
- Cinematography: Henry Freulich
- Edited by: Richard Fantl
- Music by: Morris Stoloff
- Production company: Columbia Pictures
- Distributed by: Columbia Pictures
- Release date: October 29, 1942
- Running time: 65 minutes
- Country: United States
- Language: English

Stand by All Networks is a 1942 American thriller film directed by Lew Landers and starring Florence Rice, John Beal and Margaret Hayes. The films sets were designed by Lionel Banks.

== Plot ==
Before Pearl Harbor, a radio reporter is fired by his station for his "alarmist" broadcasts. He investigates a suspected ring of Nazi saboteurs on his own.

== Cast ==
- Florence Rice as Frances Prescott
- John Beal as Ben Fallon
- Margaret Hayes as Lela Cramer
- Alan Baxter as Victor
- Mary Treen as Nora Cassidy
- Pierre Watkin as Grant Neeley
- Tim Ryan as Police Inspector Ryan
- Boyd Davis as Colonel Stanton
- Kenneth MacDonald as Captain Banion
- Patrick McVey as Monty Johnson
- Ernie Adams as Sockeye Schaefer
- Sven Hugo Borg as Sailor
- Lloyd Bridges as Slim Terry
- Eddie Laughton as Joe
- Peter Brocco as Cab Driver
- Lee Shumway as Cop
- John Tyrrell as Watchman
- Lester Dorr as Bartender
- Rick Vallin as Sound Control Room Engineer

== Bibliography ==
- Michael S. Shull. Hollywood War Films, 1937–1945: An Exhaustive Filmography of American Feature-Length Motion Pictures Relating to World War II. McFarland, 2006.
