= Marquis Chimps =

Group of trained performing chimpanzees

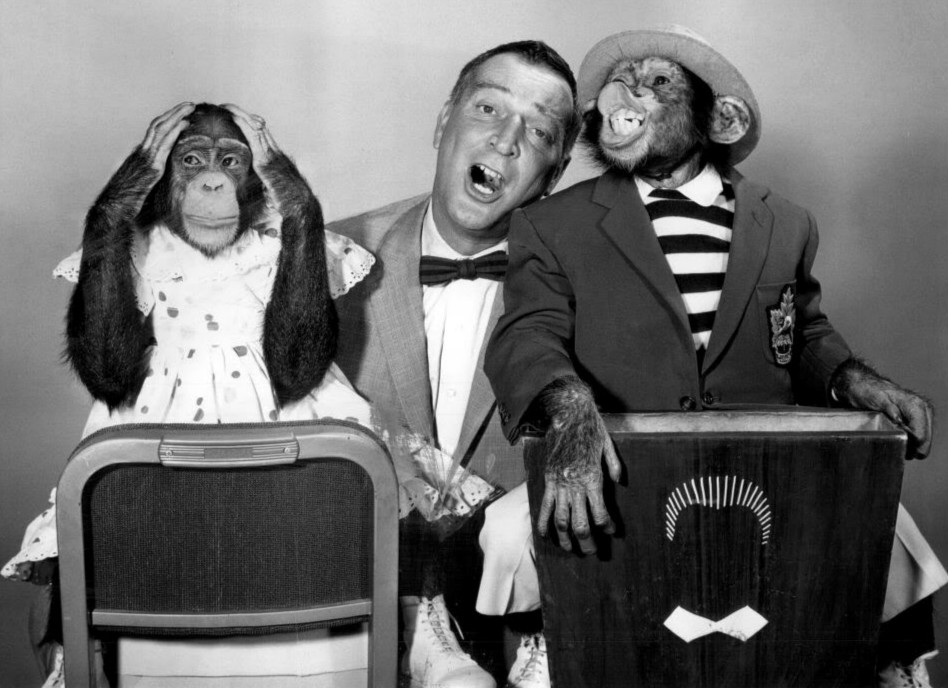
Garry Moore with two of the Marquis Chimps in 1959

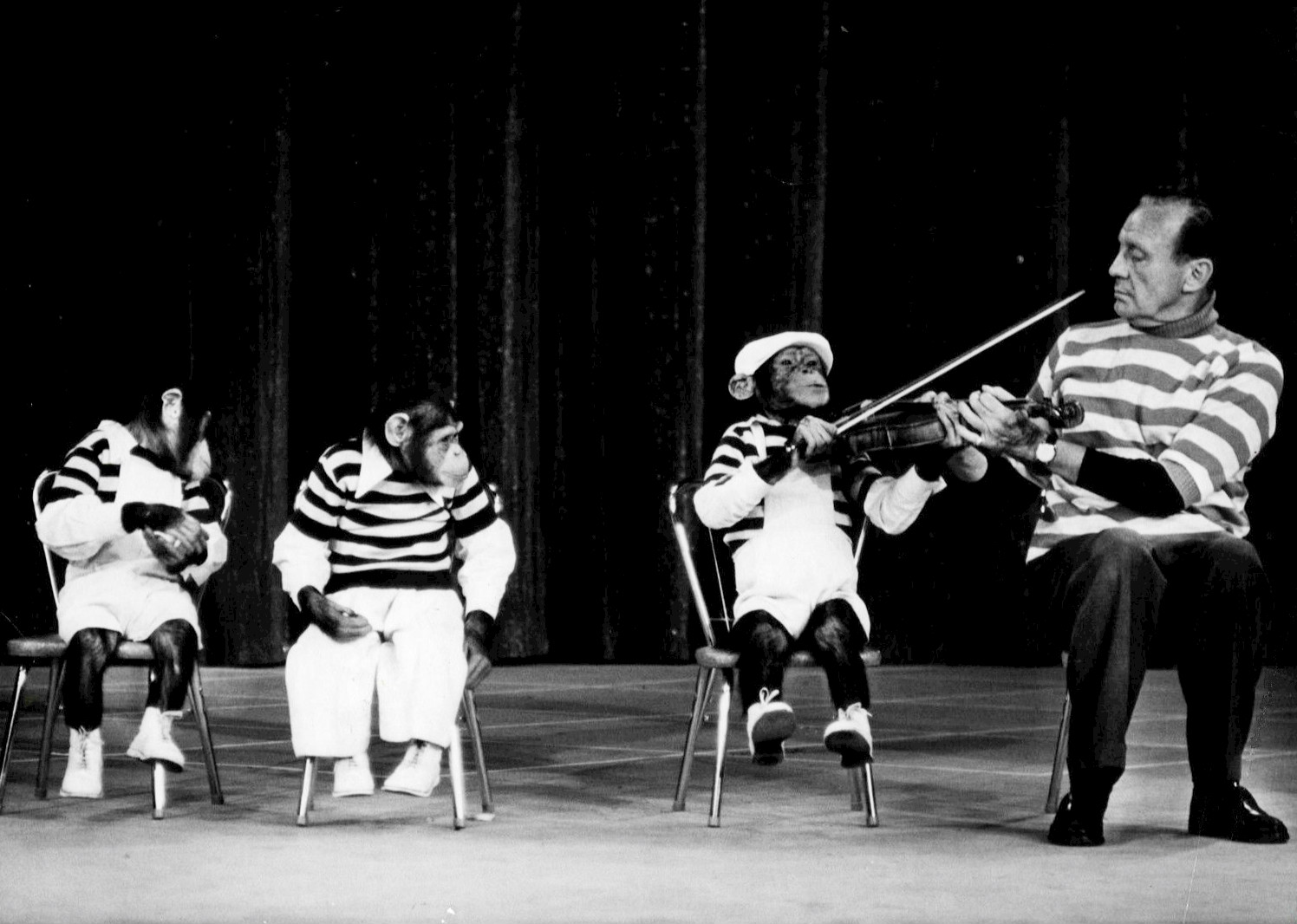
Jack Benny with the Chimps in 1963

The Marquis Chimps were a group of trained chimpanzees that were used in variety shows and television programmes and commercials, initially in Britain and then in the United States, from the late 1940s to the 1980s. They were owned and trained by Gene Detroy (born Samuel Wood; November 15, 1909 – July 11, 1986).

== History ==
Samuel Wood was born in Stockport, Cheshire, England, in 1909, to a family of circus performers. He left school at an early age, only learning to read and write in his teens, and worked in the family act as a tightrope walker in music hall shows and carnivals in England, where he was billed as "The Vagabond of the Wire". He developed the idea of working with animals, and attempted to train rhesus monkeys and baboons before buying a chimpanzee, which he named Marquis. He trained Marquis to roller skate, ride a bicycle, and then a high unicycle. By the late 1940s, he had started appearing on stage with several chimpanzees, billed as Gene Detroy and the Marquis Chimps.

In 1950 the Marquis Chimps appeared on the bill at the London Palladium, and visiting American entertainer Danny Kaye suggested that the troupe would be successful in the US. Detroy set up business in Las Vegas, training about twenty different chimpanzees over a thirty-year period, putting them in clothes and training them to use props. They worked principally as a cabaret show in nightclubs in Las Vegas, but became known nationally and internationally through television appearances. They featured regularly on The Ed Sullivan Show, on which they made about thirty appearances, and made many appearances in television commercials for Brooke Bond tea. These included commercials for Red Rose Tea in the United States, and in 1956 on ITV in Britain advertising PG Tips tea; later British advertisements used chimpanzees from Billy Smart's Circus.

In the 1950s and early 1960s, the Marquis Chimps also appeared on other networked shows in the US, including The NBC Comedy Hour, The Jack Benny Show, and The Lucy Show. They appeared in The Three Stooges' 1960 film Stop! Look! and Laugh!, and one, Marquis Jr., appeared in the Disney film Toby Tyler. The troupe also featured in the 1961 US situation comedy, The Hathaways. The show aired on ABC and starred Peggy Cass and Jack Weston as suburban Los Angeles "parents" to a trio of performing chimpanzees, named Candy, Charlie, and Enoch. The show ended in 1962 after one 26-episode season.

The Marquis Chimps continued to appear in cabaret shows in Las Vegas through the 1970s. Detroy retired in the early 1980s, and died from a heart attack in Las Vegas in 1986. The troupe was taken over by trainer Dan Westfall, a nephew of Detroy, and continued to appear in shows in Las Vegas for some years, before Westfall established a primate sanctuary that also included one of the chimpanzees credited in films as Cheeta.
