= Joe Bolton (television personality) =

American radio and television personality (1910–86)

- Born: Joseph Reeves Bolton III; September 8, 1910; Flushing, New York, United States
- Died: August 13, 1986 (aged 75); Santa Monica, California, United States
- Occupations: TV host, entertainer
- Years active: 1927–1975
- Known for: "The Clubhouse Gang" and other TV shows in the early years of television
- Spouse: Ceil Bolton
- Children: 2

Joe Bolton (September 8, 1910 – August 13, 1986) was an American radio and television personality whose entire television career was associated with New York City's independent station WPIX Channel 11 from its first day of broadcasting on June 15, 1948, until his retirement in 1975. He hosted many of the station's children's shows such as The Clubhouse Gang and The Three Stooges Funhouse dressed in a policeman's uniform and introducing himself as "Officer Joe Bolton". When hosting The Dick Tracy Show, Bolton wore a police chief's uniform.

== Biography ==
Bolton was born in Flushing, New York to Florence Youngling and Joseph Reeves Bolton II. By 1920, his parents were living in Manhattan where his father was a sales manager for hotel supplies.

He started his broadcast career in 1927 as a staff announcer for WOR in Newark, New Jersey and later at WNEW. He was the announcer for DuMont Television Network's talent show Doorway to Fame in 1947, but he left DuMont for WPIX on May 15, 1948 to be a news announcer and weatherman.

On January 17, 1955, he appeared as "Officer Joe" and hosted The Clubhouse Gang, which featured the Little Rascals and the theme song "The Whistler and his Dog". WPIX lost the rights to The Little Rascals, and in September 1958, he switched to hosting The Three Stooges Funhouse, a showcase of The Three Stooges shorts which aired on WPIX weekdays until May 7, 1970, mostly weekdays at 5:30 pm. At one time, he was host of WPIX's The Dick Tracy Show as "Police Chief Joe".

Bolton also appeared in two Three Stooges films: the 1960 compilation of archive footage from 12 two-reelers, Stop! Look! and Laugh, in which he had a cameo as "Officer Joe", and in 1965's The Outlaws Is Coming, the last feature film by The Three Stooges, which featured him and eight other local children television show hosts, all cast as Old West's most notorious outlaws.

Bolton appeared at many New York area venues, including Freedomland U.S.A. in The Bronx, to meet and entertain children. At Freedomland, he hosted appearances by The Three Stooges at the park's Moon Bowl entertainment venue. Bolton and The Three Stooges are featured in the book Freedomland U.S.A.: The Definitive History (Theme Park Press, 2019).

Bolton retired in 1975 to Santa Monica, California, and died in 1986 at Santa Monica Hospital of a heart attack.

Bolton had two children: a daughter, Catherine Bolton of Manhattan; and a son, Joseph Reeves Bolton IV of Port Salerno, Florida.

== Film appearances ==
- Home Run on the Keys (1936) (uncredited announcer in Vitaphone short starring Babe Ruth)
- Stop! Look! and Laugh (1960)
- The Outlaws Is Coming (1965)

== See also ==
- Chuck McCann
- Sandy Becker
