= Bluebeard (1944 film) =

1944 film by Edgar George Ulmer

- Theatrical release poster
- Directed by: Edgar G. Ulmer
- Screenplay by: Pierre Gendron
- Story by: Arnold Lippschitz; Werner H. Furst
- Based on: Barbe bleue
- Produced by: Leon Fromkess; Martin Mooney
- Starring: John Carradine; Jean Parker; Nils Asther
- Cinematography: Jockey Arthur Feindel (front for) Eugen Schüfftan
- Edited by: Carl Pierson
- Music by: Leo Erdody; Charles Gounod
- Production company: Producers Releasing Corporation
- Distributed by: Producers Releasing Corporation
- Release date: November 11, 1944 (United States)
- Running time: 72 minutes
- Country: United States
- Language: English
- Budget: $167,567.42

Bluebeard is a 1944 American historical film noir directed by Edgar G. Ulmer, starring John Carradine in the title role. The film also stars Jean Parker. The film is based on the famous French tale Barbe bleue that tells the story of a violent nobleman in the habit of murdering his wives and the attempts of one wife to avoid the fate of her predecessors. The film is registered in the public domain.

== Plot ==
All Paris is frightened by the murders attributed to "Bluebeard". Modiste Lucille is introduced to Gaston Morrell, a puppeteer and painter, by her friend. They are attracted to each other, and she accepts a commission to design some costumes for his puppets.

At home, Morrell is confronted by a jealous Renee, who performs in Morrell's puppet show and is his lover. When she wonders what became of the models who had posed for him, he strangles her, then dumps her body in the Seine River.

Art dealer Jean Lamarte is aware of Morrell's homicidal tendencies, but keeps his secret, as Morrell's paintings fetch high prices. However, the normally discreet Lamarte makes a mistake in selling Morrell's last work to a duke. When the duke exhibits his collection, a policeman on guard recognizes the portrait as being that of one of Bluebeard's victims.

Inspector Lefevre of the Sûreté calls in one of his best undercover agents, Francine, who happens to be Lucille's sister. She and her "father" go to Lamarte to have her portrait done. Lamarte is on his guard, but her father is willing to pay a very large commission to find the man responsible for the duke's painting, and Lamarte's greed overcomes his caution.

Morrell has decided to give up painting (which triggers his murderous compulsion) out of love for Lucille, but Lamarte pressures him into one last picture to make him financially independent. However, Francine recognizes him, having met him briefly earlier at her sister's apartment, and Morrell has no choice but to dispose of her. Certain that Francine and her father were working for the police, Lamarte tries to flee, but Morrell catches him and kills him too, before escaping. The only clue he leaves behind is the cravat he used to strangle Francine.

At Francine's funeral, Inspector Lefevre shows Lucille the cravat. She knows it belongs to Morrell, as she had mended it for him. When she confronts Morrell, he tells her the story behind his crimes. As a starving art student, he had nursed back to health a woman who had fainted, fallen in love with her, and painted her portrait. She left without warning. When his painting was chosen to hang in the Louvre, he searched for her to tell her the news, only to discover that she was a prostitute. Enraged by her contemptuous response, he strangled her. But ever since then, every model he painted turned into her in his mind, and he was compelled to kill her again and again. When Lucille tells him she is going to the authorities, he starts strangling her too, but the police break in. Lefevre saw that Lucille recognized the cravat and had her followed. After a chase across the rooftops, Morrell falls to his death into the Seine.

== Cast ==
- John Carradine as Gaston Morrell
- Jean Parker as Lucille Lutien
- Nils Asther as Inspector Jacques Lefevre
- Ludwig Stössel as Jean Lamarte (as Ludwig Stossel)
- George Pembroke as Inspector Renard
- Teala Loring as Francine Lutien
- Sonia Sorel as Renee Claremont
- Henry Kolker as Deschamps Lutien
- Emmett Lynn as Le Soldat
- Iris Adrian as Mimi Roberts
- Patti McCarty as Babette
- Carrie Devan as Constance
- Anne Sterling as Jeanette Le Beau
- Harry Cording as Policeman (uncredited)
- Frank Darien as Inquiry Judge (uncredited)
- Mabel Forrest as Woman (uncredited)
- Eddie Hall as Paul (uncredited)
- John Maxwell Hayes as Man (uncredited)
- George Irving as The Duke of Carineaux (uncredited)
- Ethelreda Leopold as Laughing Courtroom Spectator (uncredited)

== Production ==
Carradine was paid $9,333.32. Eugen Schufftan was uncredited as cinematographer due to union restrictions at the time of this film. Instead, he is listed on some prints as "production designer". The art director Paul Palmentola, a veteran of low-budget films, designed the sets.

== Reception ==
Author and film critic Leonard Maltin awarded the film 3/4 stars, calling it "Surprisingly effective". Dennis Schwartz from Ozus' World Movie Reviews gave the film a grade A, "Though not exactly a horror story, more a psycho serial killer tale that turns out to be a spellbinding chiller that mixes sleaze with thrills in an inventive way that only a great filmmaker such as Ulmer can get away with."

Nigel Honeybone of the horrornews.net said that "[The film] is badly in need of a restoration, but as it’s not likely to get one, there’s no point in waiting."

Bluebeard was released on DVD on April 21, 2000. Mark Zimmer of the Digitally obsessed.com praised the DVD's developer, All Day Entertainment for presenting the film in the "near top-notch form", adding that "[it is] a pleasure for devotees of classic horror films".

Walter Albert of the Mystery Fancier praised its visual effects and compared them to You Only Live Once, a 1937 film by Fritz Lang.

The film also got 100% positive reviews from 12 critics on film aggregator site Rotten Tomatoes.

== See also ==
- List of films in the public domain in the United States
- List of American films of 1944
