= Scandal Sheet (1939 film) =

- Directed by: Nick Grinde
- Written by: Joseph Carole
- Produced by: Ralph Cohn
- Starring: Otto Kruger; Ona Munson; Edward Norris
- Cinematography: Benjamin H. Kline
- Edited by: William A. Lyon
- Production company: Columbia Pictures
- Distributed by: Columbia Pictures
- Release date: October 16, 1939
- Running time: 66 minutes
- Country: United States
- Language: English

Scandal Sheet is a 1939 American crime film directed by Nick Grinde and starring Otto Kruger, Ona Munson and Edward Norris.

== Cast ==
- Otto Kruger as Jim Stevenson
- Ona Munson as Kitty Mulhane
- Edward Norris as Petty Haynes
- John Dilson as Chris Durk
- Don Beddoe as Chick Keller
- Dorothy Comingore as Marjorie Lawe
- Eddie Laughton as Hal Lunny
- Nedda Harrigan as Seena Haynes
- Selmer Jackson as Douglas Haynes
- Frank M. Thomas as District Attorney
- Eddie Marr as Bert Schroll
- James Craig as Mann
- John Tyrrell as Dillon
- Beatrice Blinn as Secretary
- Dick Curtis as Guard
- William Lally as Guard
- Hermine Sterler as Mrs. Kopal
- Barbara Pepper as Rena
- Kathryn Sheldon as Miss Vittie
- Gertrude Sutton as Frieda
- George Hickman as Copy Boy
- Robert Homans as McHale
- C. Montague Shaw as Dean Crosby
- Richard Fiske as Student
- Robert Sterling as Student
- James Millican as Student
- Robert Spencer as Student
- Charles McAvoy as Hickey
- Casey Johnson as Michael Kopal
- Hans Schumm as Dorgas
- Walter Sande as Hurley
- Helen Jerome Eddy as Mrs. Hazel Scoville Marsh

== Bibliography ==
- Dick, Bernard F. Columbia Pictures: Portrait of a Studio. University Press of Kentucky, 2014.
