= A Pain in the Pullman =

1936 American short film by Preston Black

- Directed by: Preston Black
- Written by: Preston Black
- Produced by: Jules White
- Starring: Moe Howard; Larry Fine; Curly Howard; Bud Jamison; James C. Morton; Eddie Laughton; Loretta Andrews; Phyllis Crane; Wilna Hervey
- Cinematography: Benjamin H. Kline
- Edited by: William A. Lyon
- Distributed by: Columbia Pictures
- Release date: June 27, 1936 (U.S.)
- Running time: 19:46
- Country: United States
- Language: English

A Pain in the Pullman is a 1936 short subject directed by Preston Black starring American slapstick comedy team The Three Stooges (Moe Howard, Larry Fine and Curly Howard). It is the 16th entry in the series released by Columbia Pictures starring the comedians, who released 190 shorts for the studio between 1934 and 1959.

== Plot ==
The Stooges are struggling actors rehearsing their act in a rooming house. The establishment's other tenants include the vain actor Paul Payne, who becomes enraged when the Stooges' pet monkey, Joe, steals his toupee.

In response to a telephone call from a booking agent, the Stooges rush to board an overnight train to meet a theatrical commitment. With them is Joe, who is part of their act. Also boarding the train are a stage manager/boss named Mr. Johnson and Paul Payne, who as a star actor issues a demand that Joe be stowed in the baggage car. The Stooges' attempt to comply is thwarted when the baggage car door closes prematurely, so they surreptitiously bring Joe into the passenger compartment, setting the stage for chaos.

The Stooges cause disruptions among their fellow passengers, first by entering Paul Payne's private drawing room in his absence and eating a fancy meal he had ordered; then by disturbing sleeping passengers with their many loud and unsuccessful attempts to climb into their berth. After Joe escapes from the trio and roams freely, the trio struggles to conceal him from Mr. Johnson, who is repeatedly awakened and greatly exasperated by the escalating commotion. The tumult reaches a climax when Joe, seized by fear, activates the train's emergency brake, abruptly halting its progress. Facing the ire of both passengers and the conductor, the Stooges are summarily ejected from the train.

== Cast ==
=== Credited ===
- Moe Howard as Moe
- Larry Fine as Larry
- Curly Howard as Curly

=== Uncredited ===
- Bud Jamison as Johnson
- James C. Morton as Paul Payne
- Eddie Laughton as Train Conductor
- Anne O'Neal as Mrs. Hammond Eggerly
- Jesse De Vorska as O'Brien
- Phyllis Crane as Girl Kissed by Curly
- Bobby Burns as Man in Berth
- Hilda Title as Crab Dinner Companion
- Ethelreda Leopold as Show Girl
- Blanche Payson as Woman with Hat
- Wilna Hervey as Large Woman
- Al Thompson as Pedestrian
- George Gray as Workman with Ladder
- Ray Turner as Pullman Porter
- Al Herman as Drunk
- Gail Arnold as Show Girl
- Loretta Andrews as Show Girl
- Elaine Waters as Show Girl
- Mary Lou Dix as Karen
- Johnny Kascier as Train Passenger
- Bert Young as Train Passenger
- Joe the Monkey as Monkey

== Production notes ==
A Pain in the Pullman is the longest short film the Stooges made at Columbia Pictures, running at 19 minutes, 46 seconds; the shortest is Sappy Bull Fighters, running at 15 minutes, 19 seconds. Filming was completed between April 29 and May 4, 1936.

This is the first short in which Moe, Larry, and Curly are actually referred to as "The Three Stooges" in the dialogue.

The closing shot of the Stooges leaping over a bush, and landing on a trio of bucking steers was reused at the end of A Ducking They Did Go.

The plot device of performers traveling via rail and enduring sleeping hardships was previously used by Laurel and Hardy in 1929's Berth Marks. Female comedy team ZaSu Pitts and Thelma Todd also borrowed the plot device for their 1932 short Show Business (directed by Jules White). Gus Schilling and Richard Lane remade the film in 1947 as Training for Trouble.

The name "Johnson" was shouted a total number of 10 times.

== Shellfish ==
Moe Howard had fond memories of filming A Pain in the Pullman. In his autobiography Moe Howard and the Three Stooges, he specifically recalled his intense dislike for shellfish, and how brother Curly Howard cut the inside of his mouth eating the shells from a Dungeness crab:

...In one sequence, all three of us wound up in the same upper berth. Later, we found ourselves a drawing room, not knowing it was assigned to the star of the show (James C. Morton). There was a lovely table set in the room with all kinds of delicacies.

At one point Curly picked up the hard-shelled Dungeness crab. We, of course, were not supposed to know what it was. Larry thought it was a tarantula, Curly figured it to be a turtle, and I concluded that it must be something to eat or it wouldn't be on the table with crackers and sauce.

As the scene progressed, Curly tried to open the crab shell and bent the tines of his fork. I took the fork from Curly, tossed a napkin on the floor, and asked him to pick it up. When Curly bent over, I hit him on the head with the crab, breaking the shell into a million pieces. Then Curly scooped out some of the meat, tasted it, and made a face. He threw the meat away and proceeded to eat the shell.

I have to tell you, if there's one thing to which I have an aversion, it's shellfish, and I couldn't bring myself—even for a film—to put that claw in my mouth. Preston Black, the director, asked me to just lick the claw, but I couldn't. He finally had the prop man duplicate the claw out of sugar and food coloring and had me nibble on it as though I was enjoying it. I was still very wary during the scene. I was afraid they had coated the real shell with sugar and that that awful claw was underneath. I chewed that claw during the scene, but if you'll notice, I did it very gingerly.

In the meantime, Curly was still chewing on the shell, which was cutting the inside of his mouth. Finally, our star comes back to his room and kicks us out, and we three climb into our upper berth to go to sleep.
