= Idle Roomers (1944 film) =

1944 film by Del Lord

- Directed by: Del Lord
- Written by: Del Lord; Elwood Ullman
- Produced by: Hugh McCollum
- Starring: Moe Howard; Larry Fine; Curly Howard; Christine McIntyre; Vernon Dent; Duke York; Eddie Laughton; Esther Howard
- Cinematography: Glen Gano
- Edited by: Henry Batista
- Distributed by: Columbia Pictures
- Release date: July 15, 1944 (U.S.)
- Running time: 16:51
- Country: United States
- Language: English

Idle Roomers is a 1944 short subject directed by Del Lord starring American slapstick comedy team The Three Stooges (Moe Howard, Larry Fine and Curly Howard). It is the 80th entry in the series released by Columbia Pictures starring the comedians, who released 190 shorts for the studio between 1934 and 1959.

== Plot ==
As bellhops at the esteemed Hotel Snazzy Plaza, the Stooges find themselves entangled in a series of misadventures. Their initial aspiration to court an attractive woman on the premises is thwarted by the presence of her formidable and ill-tempered husband, proficient in the art of knife throwing. Complicating matters further is the clandestine importation of Lupe the Wolf Man, a creature prone to uncontrollable fits of rage upon hearing music.

Subsequently, during Curly's routine cleaning of the couple's quarters, the inadvertent activation of a radio precipitates Lupe's violent rampage. In their frantic attempt to flee, the Stooges seek refuge in the hotel's elevator, unaware of the wolf man's presence. Manipulating the elevator controls, Lupe inadvertently propels the trio and himself skyward, resulting in a chaotic ascent through the elevator shaft.

== Production notes ==
Filmed on November 17–20, 1943, the title Idle Roomers is a pun on "idle rumors." The plot device of bellhops pursuing the affections of an attractive female hotel guest would be used in the 1953 Woody Woodpecker cartoon Belle Boys.

Idle Roomers marked the first appearance of regular Stooge co-star Christine McIntyre who would predominantly work with the team for the remainder of the series.

=== Curly Howard fades ===
Curly Howard's voice begins to deepen with this film. Since his 1940 divorce from Elaine Ackerman, Curly had lived a wild life, making merry on a regular basis, and drinking until the wee hours of the morning. Columbia cinematographer Henry Freulich stated in a 1984 interview that it was not unusual to see Curly stumbling into work looking like "he had himself a heluva time!" By late 1943, the effects of Curly's lifestyle began to have an effect on his performances. Idle Roomers marks the first time his acting seems a little slower. The deeper voice confirms this assessment.

Curly did manage to drop the word "F@#K" in his dialogue, that was somehow missed during the editing process.

== See also ==
- List of American films of 1944
