= Goofs and Saddles =

1937 American short film by Del Lord

- Theatrical release poster
- Directed by: Del Lord
- Written by: Felix Adler
- Produced by: Jules White
- Starring: Moe Howard; Larry Fine; Curly Howard; Stanley Blystone; Ted Lorch; Cy Schindell; Eddie Laughton; Hank Bell
- Cinematography: Benjamin H. Kline
- Edited by: Charles Nelson
- Distributed by: Columbia Pictures
- Release date: July 2, 1937 (U.S.)
- Running time: 17:10
- Country: United States
- Language: English

Goofs and Saddles is a 1937 American Western short subject film directed by Del Lord and starring the slapstick comedy team The Three Stooges (Moe Howard, Larry Fine and Curly Howard). It is the 24th entry in the series released by Columbia Pictures starring the comedians, who released 190 shorts for the studio between 1934 and 1959.

== Plot ==
Set in the American Old West, the Stooges are scouts tasked with apprehending a notorious gang of cattle rustlers under the command of the nefarious Longhorn Pete. Directed by General Muster, the trio embarks on their mission, using stealth tactics by disguising themselves as bushes in a bid to surveil the rustlers' activities.

However, their efforts are thwarted when the rustlers discover their ruse and unleash a volley of gunfire, compelling the Stooges to hastily retreat. They seek refuge within Longhorn Pete's bustling saloon, where they pose as gamblers while awaiting the arrival of the cavalry. While engaged with Pete in a game of poker they cheat outrageously to provide Curly a winning hand, but allow Pete to win after they learn that he has killed other card cheats that day.

In a bid to alert General Muster of their predicament, Moe dispatches a message via carrier pigeon, but the pigeon and message are intercepted by Pete, thereby jeopardizing their cover. Forced to flee again, the Stooges seize upon a covered wagon as their means of escape, and embark on a chaotic journey replete with an unexpected simian companion. After taking refuge in a shack, the Stooges repurpose a meat grinder into a makeshift Gatling gun after accidentally spilling a box of bullets into it. Their weapon turns the tide of the confrontation, enabling them to overpower the bandits until the timely intervention of General Muster and his troops culminates in the apprehension of the outlaws.

However, amidst the celebratory accolades, the mischievous monkey activates the grinder, triggering a flurry of shots that prompts the Stooges to run from the scene.

== Cast ==
=== Credited ===
- Moe Howard as Wild Bill Hiccup
- Larry Fine as Just Plain Bill
- Curly Howard as Buffalo Billious

=== Uncredited ===
- Stanley Blystone as Longhorn Pete
- Ted Lorch as General Muster
- Ethan Laidlaw as Tex
- Hank Mann as Lem
- Sam Lufkin as Colonel
- Eddie Laughton as Bartender
- Lew Davis, William Irving as Poker players
- Cy Schindell, Hank Bell, Blackie Whiteford, Jerome "Blackjack" Ward as gang members
- Ethelreda Leopold, Eve Reynolds, Elaine Waters as saloon girls

== Production notes ==
The title Goofs and Saddles is a spoof of the term "hooves and saddles". Filming was completed on April 14–19, 1937.

The Stooges' names in this short are Buffalo Billious (Curly), Wild Bill Hiccup (Moe), and Just Plain Bill (Larry). The cultural references are to, respectively, American Old West figures Buffalo Bill and Wild Bill Hickok, and Just Plain Bill, an iconic radio soap opera of the era.

General Muster is a spoof on famous American Civil War and American Indian War General, George Armstrong Custer.

The chase sequence on horseback would be recycled in 1954's Pals and Gals.

This short has the smallest slap count. Moe smacks Curly softly on his head and he slaps Larry when he thought Larry pulled them off the horses after hitting a tree branch.
