= All the World's a Stooge =

1941 film by Del Lord

- Directed by: Del Lord
- Written by: John Grey
- Produced by: Del Lord; Hugh McCollum
- Starring: Moe Howard; Larry Fine; Curly Howard; Lelah Tyler; Emory Parnell; Richard Fiske; Olaf Hytten; Bud Jamison; Symona Boniface; Ethelreda Leopold
- Cinematography: Benjamin H. Kline
- Edited by: Art Seid
- Distributed by: Columbia Pictures
- Release date: May 16, 1941 (U.S.)
- Running time: 16:03
- Country: United States
- Language: English

All the World's a Stooge is a 1941 short subject directed by Del Lord starring American slapstick comedy team The Three Stooges (Moe Howard, Larry Fine and Curly Howard). It is the 55th entry in the series released by Columbia Pictures starring the comedians, who released 190 shorts for the studio between 1934 and 1959.

== Plot ==
Wealthy Ajax Bullion is disgruntled when his eccentric wife announces that she has arranged to adopt a refugee – she enthusiastically explains that "it's really quite the thing socially". Meanwhile, Ajax grapples with a severe toothache, prompting his wife to insist he visit the dentist while she prepares the nursery.

Simultaneously, the Stooges are at work washing windows on a tall building's scaffold. Following a mishap involving a bucket of water thrown through the window of a dentist's office, the irate dentist threatens to have them dismissed. He tasks them with drying the wet floor and leaves. While they are at work, Ajax enters, mistakes the Stooges for dentists, and asks them to pull his tooth. The Stooges knock him unconscious with a mallet and proceed to extract his bridge-work. The ensuing efforts to reinsert the bridge with cement go awry, prompting them to resort to dynamite. The dentist returns just as the dynamite is ignited, compelling the Stooges to flee. Mr. Bullion awakens unharmed and expresses gratitude to the dentist for relieving his toothache.

When the Stooges descend on their scaffold they collide with a police officer on the ground. Making a hasty escape, they hide in a nearby parked car. It is Mr. Bullion's car, and when he discovers them he capitalizes on the situation by persuading the Stooges to pose as refugee children, aiming to dissuade his wife from her philanthropic aspirations. The Stooges, now dressed as toddlers, endure a comical adoption by Mrs. Bullion, with Moe, Curly, and Larry assuming the names Johnny, Frankie, and Mabel, respectively.

As the Stooges integrate into the Bullion household, their antics and disruptive behavior during a party organized by Mrs. Bullion lead to regret on her part. Mr. Bullion, already frustrated by the Stooges' theft of his cigars, becomes enraged after a pie hurled by "Johnny" hits him in the face, and he chases the Stooges out of the house wielding an axe.

== Production notes ==
Filmed on August 24–28, 1940, the title of the film parodies William Shakespeare's "All the world's a stage."

Adopting refugees from European countries was a common event amongst society people during World War II.
