= Fulton–Mock–Blackmer House =

Historic house in North Carolina, United States

- U.S. Historic district – Contributing property
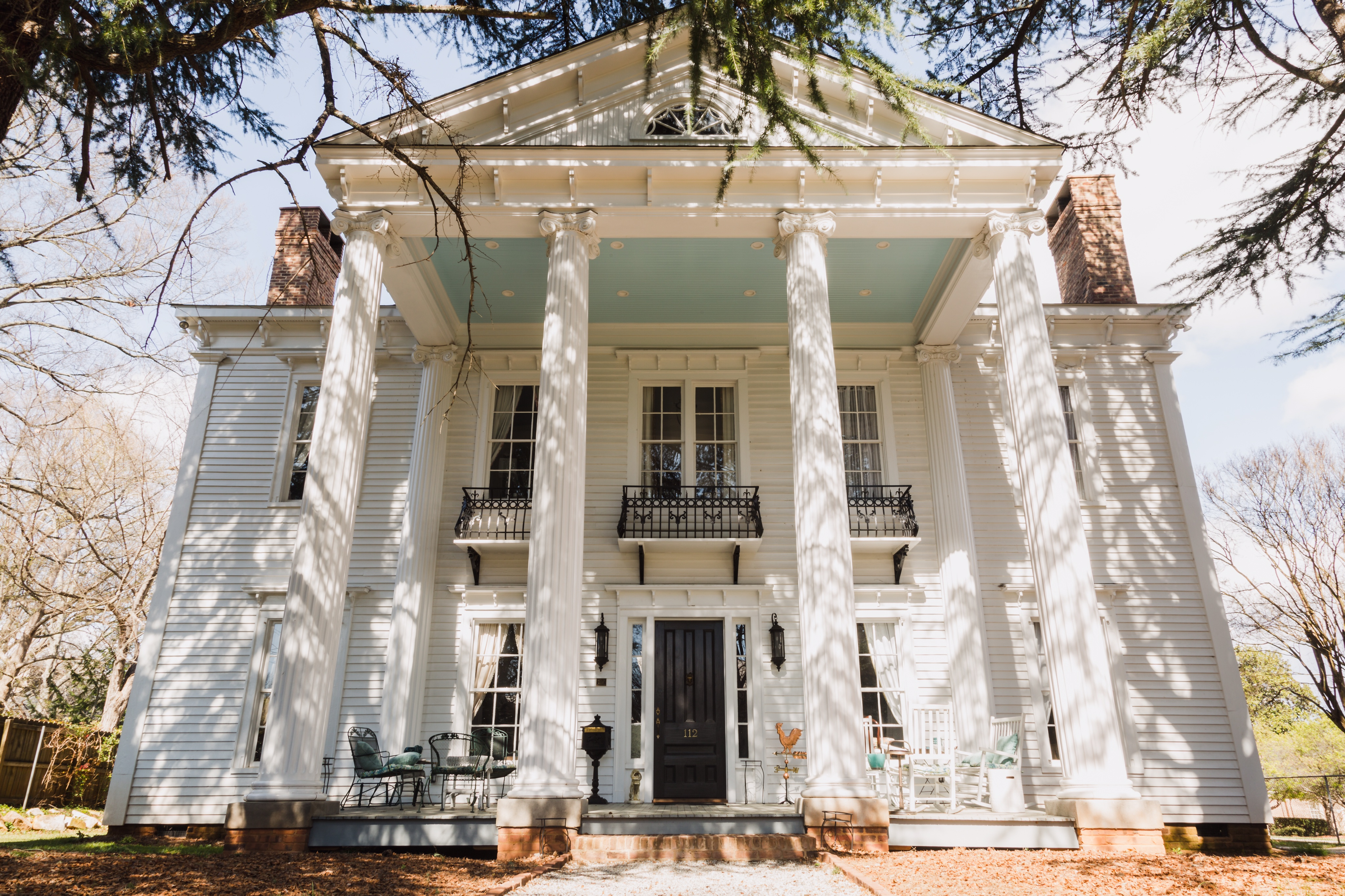
- In 2017

- Location within North Carolina Location within the United States
- Location: Fulton Street, Salisbury, North Carolina
- Coordinates: 35°40′11″N 80°28′25″W
- Architectural style: Federalist style
- Part of: Salisbury Historic District
- Designated CP: 1975

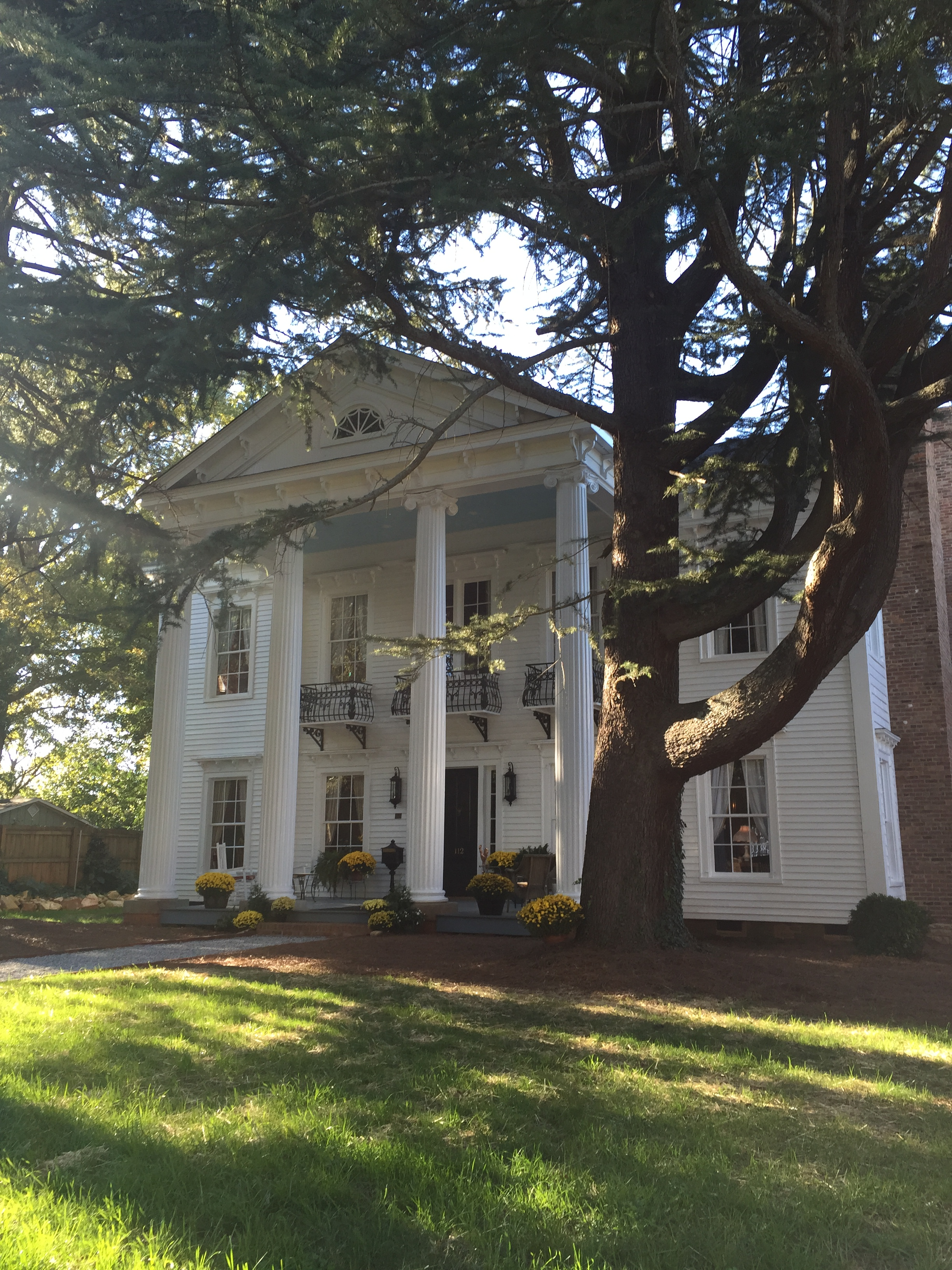
Fulton-Mock-Blackmer House in 2015 after completion of the renovation

The Fulton–Mock–Blackmer House is a historic home built in 1820 in Salisbury, North Carolina, US, whose most famous resident was the actor Sidney Blackmer. It was severely damaged in a 1984 fire, then left largely neglected for nearly three decades. A full restoration was completed in 2015. It is located in the West Square Historic District, created by the city in 1975, and is a contributing structure to the Salisbury Historic District.

John Fulton, for whom Fulton Street was named, built the Federalist style house in Salisbury in 1820. An ad in the January 1, 1821 Western Carolinian said, "The subscriber is now finishing a large and commodious house in this place, on the western side of the town, situated between the Male and Female Academies, which he intends as a boarding-house for young ladies." Fulton died in 1827 and his stepson Maxwell Chambers inherited the property. President Andrew Jackson appointed Fulton's nephew William S. Fulton governor of Arkansas. Girls who attended Salisbury Academy lived in the house, and later the house became a school. Davidson College owned the house at one time. The A.J. Mock family owned the house and added Italianate brackets above the front windows. They also replaced original Federal style windows, of which one remained.

Actor Sidney Blackmer bought the house in 1931 and the family lived there. Blackmer planted cedar trees, a holly tree and a cucumber magnolia. The 5000-square-foot house at Fulton and Innes Streets sat vacant after a December 1, 1984 fire, after which Suzanne Blackmer could not afford a restoration. Four ionic columns added between 1906 and 1908 were stored, though a base of one was left as a guide for a possible restoration. Contractor Al Wilson also fixed the roof and foundation in 1989, actions credited with keeping the house from falling down during years of neglect. In 2008, Jonathan Blackmer, son of Sidney and Suzanne, asked that the house either be torn down or restored for "any public use", such as a museum devoted to his father's career. In June 2012, Historic Salisbury Foundation, which had done some work on the house over the years, agreed to buy it, paying $109,611 to Jonathan Blackmer. Renovation was under way, and in April 2013, the public was allowed inside the house for the first time in 28 years. Architect Joseph K. Oppermann pointed out its "Federal-style windows and shutters, false wood graining on doors and early wallpaper." Blue wallpaper with the photo of Commodore Stephen Decatur was found in the front parlor. Brian Davis, Historic Salisbury Foundation executive director, said the roof would be raised to where it was originally, restoring a full attic. Materials from the historic Grimes Mill, which burned in 2013, were to be used in the house.

In February 2014, the Dixons bought the house from the Historic Salisbury Foundation for $150,000. Historic preservation tax credits helped the Dixons with the restoration, which was completed in early 2015. The Fulton–Mock–Blackmer House won a 2015 historic preservation award from Historic Salisbury Foundation, in the category Private Preservation & Neighborhood Revitalization. The chimneys were replaced, but their old bricks were used as a facade. Otherwise, the couple planned to keep as much of the house's history as possible. The restored 20-foot columns were returned July 14 but still needed capitals.

Old photos and Jonathan Blackmer's memories helped determine what needed to be done. As much as possible, each section of the house would look as it had at some point in its history. Interior doors dating to 1820 are still in use.
