= List of supporting actors in Three Stooges films =

This is a list of actors who have co-starred in films with The Three Stooges. Inclusion on this list should be reserved for notable actors that can be confirmed as taking supporting roles (either credited or uncredited) in films commonly regarded as having the Three Stooges as primary characters. Films where the Three Stooges appear as a guest or cameo appearance, or the actors who portray them appear outside the character of The Three Stooges should not be considered.

== List ==
This list is incomplete. You can help Wikipedia by expanding it.

Actor	Stooges Film(s)	First appearance (year)	Total appearances	Notes
Eadie Adams	Restless Knights (1935)	1935	1	
Mary Ainslee	In the Sweet Pie and Pie (1941); Some More of Samoa (1941); I'll Never Heil Again (1941); Hokus Pokus (1949); Pest Man Wins (1951); He Cooked His Goose (1952); Flagpole Jitters (1956); Triple Crossed (1959)	1941	8	Several appearances in later stooges films are stock footage.
Murray Alper				
Dorothy Appleby				
Phil Arnold				
Buddy Baer	Snow White and the Three Stooges	1961	1	Appears as "Hordred". He was a famous boxer: 1934-1942. He also Starred as "Vargas the Giant" in "Giant from the Unknown" 1958.
Mark Bailey				
Lucille Ball	Three Little Pigskins (1934)	1934	1	Went on to a successful career as an actress, comedian, model, and film studio executive. Hits include television shows I Love Lucy, The Lucy–Desi Comedy Hour, The Lucy Show, Here's Lucy, and Life with Lucy.
Edgar Barrier				
Phyllis Barry				
Rayford Barnes				
Don Beddoe				
Bruce Bennett				
Nita Bieber				
Bonnie Bonnell				
Gladys Blake				
Mel Blanc				
Joe Bolton				
Lynton Brent				
Stanley Blystone	Half Shot Shooters (1936); Spook Louder (1943); Pardon My Clutch (1948); Slaphappy Sleuths (1950)			
Bobby Burns				
Symona Boniface				
Nanette Bordeaux				
Harold Brauer	Various	1946	10	One of two Stooge supporting actors appearing with all six Stooges.
Lloyd Bridges				
Peter Brocco				
Samson Burke				
Walter Burke				
Sally Cairns				
Bill Camfield				
Connie Cezan				
George Chesebro				
Carol Christensen				
Jack Clifford				
Peter Coe				
Robert Colbert				
Monte Collins				
Chester Conklin				
Heinie Conklin				
Spade Cooley				
Gino Corrado				
Phyllis Crane				
Dick Curtis				
Maurice Dallimore				
Diana Darrin				
Michael David				
Lew Davis				
Peter Dawson				
Marjorie Deanne				
Vernon Dent		1936	96	
Richard Devon				
Dudley Dickerson				
Ann Doran	Three Sappy People	1939	1	Appears as the "Countess". She also starred in: "It! The Terror From Beyond Space." 1958
Anthony Eustrel				
Herbert Evans				
Herbie Faye				
Richard Fiske				
Kelly Flint				
Bess Flowers				
Peter Forster				
Joan Freeman	The Three Stooges Go Around the World in a Daze.	1963	1	Appears as Amelia Carter. Also starred as Mrs. Jarvis in "Friday the 13th: The Final Chapter" (1984).
Paul Frees				
Milton Frome				
Hal Fryar				
Paul "Mousie" Garner				
Maxine Gates				
Slim Gaut				
Henry Gibson				
Julie Gibson				
Billy Gilbert				
Johnny Ginger				
June Gittelson				
Ned Glass				
Ruth Godfrey				
Lorna Gray				
Dee Green				
Jane Hamilton				
Ted Healy				
Carol Heiss				
Althea Henley				
Al Hill				
Rex Holman				
Victoria Horne				
Doris Houck				
Mary Beth Hughes				
William Irving				
Bud Jamison		1934	38	
Suzanne Kaaren				
Johnny Kascier				
Iau Kea				
Fred Kelsey				
Tom Kennedy				
Robert Kino				
Fred Kohler				
Nancy Kovack				
Frank Lackteen				
Don Lamond (not to be confused with the jazz drummer of the same name)				
Muriel Landers				
Eddie Laughton				
Norman Leavitt				
Lu Leonard				
Ethelreda Leopold				
George J. Lewis				
Sylvia Lewis				
Jack "Tiny" Lipson				
Anna-Lisa				
Margie Liszt				
Babe London				
Ted Lorch				
Kenneth MacDonald				
Betty Mack				
Wayne Mack				
Jock Mahoney				
Laurie Main				
Judy Malcolm				
Ed T. McDonnell				
Christine McIntyre		1944	34	Appearances in later Stooges films are stock footage.
Marlin McKeever				
Mike McKeever				
Dal McKennon				
Eva McKenzie				
Patricia Medina				
Cheerio Meredith				
Frank Mills				
Mort Mills				
Frank Mitchell				
Geneva Mitchell				
James C. Morton				
George N. Neise				
Nestor Paiva				
Joe Palma				Also served as a stand-in for Shemp Howard for the last four Stooge films starring Shemp with new footage.
Shirley Patterson	Spook Louder	1943	1	Appears as "Perkins". She also starred in: "It! The Terror From Beyond Space." 1958
Blanche Payson				
Snub Pollard				
Stanley Price				
Norma Randall				
Rebel Randall				
Quinn Redeker				
Suzanne Ridgeway				
Blossom Rock	Snow White and the Three Stooges	1961	1	Appears as the "Servant Lady". Best known as "Grandmama" on The Addams Family (1964-1966).
Guy Rolfe	Snow White and the Three Stooges	1961	1	Appears as "Count Oga". Also starred as Abdre Toulon in the "Puppet Master" series (1991-1999).
Gene Roth				
Benny Rubin				
Tim Ryan				
Fred Sanborn				
Jay Sheffield				
Cy Schindell				
Bruce Sedley				
Harry Semels		1935	7	
Paul Shannon				
Emil Sitka	Various	1947	35	One of two Stooge supporting actors appearing with all six Stooges.
Barbara Slater				
Shawn Smith	Spook Louder	1943	1	Appears as "Perkins". She also starred in: "It! The Terror From Beyond Space." 1958
Sally Starr				
Robert Stevens				
Robert Stevenson				
Edson Stroll				
Frank Sully				
Harriette Tarler				
Forrest Taylor				
Greta Thyssen				
Al Thompson				
Vicki Trickett				
Victor Travers				
John Tyrrell				
Philip Van Zandt				
Dick Wessel				
Adam West	The Outlaws Is Coming	1965	1	Appears as Kenneth Cabo. Best known as Bruce Wayne in "BATMAN" (1966-1968)
Blackie Whiteford				
Jean Willes				
Patricia Wright				
Evelyn Young	Three Sappy People (1939); Boobs in Arms (1940); From Nurse to Worse (1940); Nutty but Nice (1940); No Census, No Feeling (1940)	1939	5	Footage was also used in the TV shows The Three Stooges Greatest Hits (1997), The Three Stooges 75th Anniversary Special (2003), and Hey Moe, Hey Dad! programs #3 Eureka! and #4 Slap Happy (2015).
Duke York		1943	7	Appearances in later Stooges films are stock footage.
Walter Brennan				
