= Three Stooges Fun-O-Rama =

- Theatrical poster
- Directed by: Jules White
- Produced by: Jules White
- Starring: Moe Howard; Larry Fine; Joe Besser
- Distributed by: Columbia Pictures
- Release date: September 1, 1959
- Running time: variable, depending on the number of films
- Country: United States
- Language: English

Three Stooges Fun-O-Rama was a 1959 Three Stooges program intended for theaters, combining several two-reel comedies starring Moe Howard, Larry Fine, and Joe Besser into a full-length presentation. Each local theater manager could customize the program to suit his own needs and advertise it as a "feature-length laugh treat", playing as few as three shorts or as many as six. The Fun-O-Rama was merely the umbrella title for a group of shorts; there never was an actual feature film produced with this title.

Ten of the sixteen shorts with Besser were made available for the Fun-O-Rama program, including:

- Horsing Around (1957)
- Rusty Romeos (1957)
- Outer Space Jitters (1957)
- Quiz Whizz (1958)
- Fifi Blows Her Top (1958)
- Pies and Guys (1958)
- Sweet and Hot (1958)
- Flying Saucer Daffy (1958)
- Oil's Well That Ends Well (1958)
- Triple Crossed (1959)

== History ==
Columbia Pictures was still offering new, first-run Three Stooges comedy shorts to theaters in 1959. The studio's television subsidiary, Screen Gems, had recently syndicated 78 Stooge shorts to local television stations, and the films caught on immediately. The Stooges were suddenly TV stars, and their spectacular comeback was noted by Variety in a front-page item: "Resurgence of the Three Stooges, via the exposure of their old two-reelers on television, is resulting in an almost 200% increase in bookings of their new shorts in theaters, according to Maurice Grad, Columbia's short subject sales manager."

Columbia capitalized on the Stooges' boxoffice appeal by preparing Three Stooges Fun-O-Rama for the kiddie-matinée audience. The studio had already offered a similar package of assorted two-reel comedies, Columbia Laff Hour, in 1956; exhibitors could choose from the studio's recent releases with the Three Stooges, Andy Clyde, Hugh Herbert, Vera Vague, and other comics.
