= Have Rocket, Will Travel =

1959 American film by David Lowell Rich

- Theatrical release banner
- Directed by: David Lowell Rich
- Written by: Raphael Hayes
- Produced by: Harry A. Romm
- Starring: Moe Howard; Larry Fine; Joe DeRita; Anna-Lisa; Robert Colbert
- Narrated by: Don Lamond
- Cinematography: Ray Cory
- Edited by: Danny B. Landres
- Music by: Mischa Bakaleinikoff
- Distributed by: Columbia Pictures Corporation
- Release date: August 1, 1959 (U.S.)
- Running time: 76:14
- Country: United States
- Language: English
- Budget: $380,000
- Box office: $2.5 million

Have Rocket, Will Travel is a 1959 American science-fiction comedy film released by Columbia Pictures and starring the Three Stooges, consisting of Moe Howard, Larry Fine and new addition Joe DeRita ("Curly Joe"). The film was produced to capitalize on the Three Stooges' late-1950s resurgence in popularity. The supporting cast features Anna-Lisa and Robert Colbert.

== Plot ==
The Stooges are janitors working at a space center. Through a series of mishaps, they accidentally find themselves launched into space and land on Venus. There, they encounter strange creatures, including a talking unicorn and a giant fire-breathing tarantula, as well as an alien computer that has eradicated all life on the planet. The computer creates evil robot duplicates of the Stooges. Eventually, they manage to return to Earth, where they are celebrated as heroes. However, chaos erupts at their welcome-back party when the evil robot duplicates arrive, leading to a comedic melee. At the end the Stooges sing a song about being in space while riding a rocket—and Moe gets hit with cream pies!

== Cast ==
- Moe Howard as Moe/robot duplicate
- Larry Fine as Larry/robot duplicate
- Joe DeRita as Curly Joe/robot duplicate
- Anna-Lisa as Dr. Ingrid Naarveg
- Robert Colbert as Dr. Ted Benson
- Jerome Cowan as Mr. Morse
- Don Lamond as Venusian robot/reporter/narrator
- Robert Stevenson as Voice of the Thingtz
- Dal McKennon as Voice of Uni the Unicorn

== Production ==
Have Rocket, Will Travel was Joe DeRita's inaugural screen appearance with the Stooges. He had replaced Joe Besser when Columbia ceased production of the Stooges' shorts series. The title is a play on the title of the popular television show of the time, Have Gun – Will Travel. Filming was completed over 13 days between May 18 and June 1, 1959.

Although billed as such, the film was not the first starring feature for the Three Stooges. Their first feature film was Rockin' in the Rockies (1945), which is also the only feature film with Moe, Larry and Curly. The Three Stooges had also starred in the 1951 film Gold Raiders with George O'Brien during the Shemp Howard era, and had supporting roles in several 1930s films when they were affiliated with Ted Healy, including Dancing Lady with Joan Crawford, Clark Gable, Robert Benchley and Fred Astaire.

The space-travel theme of Have Rocket, Will Travel was prevalent in the late 1950s. The Stooges had already filmed three shorts for Columbia based on this theme (Space Ship Sappy, Outer Space Jitters and Flying Saucer Daffy). They would appear in another space-themed comedy feature in 1962, The Three Stooges in Orbit.

In the original cut, the Stooges were the only people shown after the rocket-launch scene early in the film, but the studio insisted on a party scene in order to introduce other characters.

== Reception ==
=== Box office ===
Have Rocket, Will Travel was released on August 1, 1959, to mixed critical reviews but was a success at the box office. During its first five days of a multiple-theater engagement in Los Angeles, where it was double-billed with The Legend of Tom Dooley, the film grossed $127,000 ($1,402,654 today). The film ultimately grossed over $2.5 million ($27,611,301 today) for Columbia Pictures against a $380,000 budget ($4,196,918 today).

=== Critical response ===
Moe Howard expressed his dislike for the film in 1973, stating: "Didn't care much for Have Rocket, Will Travel. It was contrived a lot. The pies were dragged in at the tail end and not only that, the unicorn business and all that...ugh."

== Soundtrack ==
The Three Stooges Sing Have Rocket, Will Travel

Soundtrack album by The Three Stooges
- Released: August 1959
- Studio: Columbia Pictures
- Genre: Comedy
- Length: 3:14
- Label: Colpix Records
- Producer: George Duning

The soundtrack was released as a two-sided 45-rpm single in August 1959 by Colpix Records to coincide with the film's release. The Three Stooges sing the film's theme song backed by vocal group the Tinglers. The title song was written by George Duning and Stanley Styne and arranged by Dennis Farnon.

The record sold well but did not chart highly because Columbia Pictures did not afford it much publicity.

No.	Title	Length
1.	"Have Rocket, Will Travel (Part 1)" (George Duning, Stanley Styne)	1:26
2.	"Have Rocket, Will Travel (Part 2)" (George Duning, Stanley Styne)	1:48

== See also ==
- List of American films of 1959
