= Cuckoo on a Choo Choo =

1952 American short film by Jules White

- Directed by: Jules White
- Written by: Felix Adler
- Produced by: Jules White
- Starring: Moe Howard; Larry Fine; Shemp Howard; Patricia Wright; Victoria Horne
- Cinematography: Henry Freulich
- Edited by: Edwin H. Bryant
- Distributed by: Columbia Pictures
- Release date: December 4, 1952 (U.S.)
- Running time: 15:28
- Country: United States
- Language: English

Cuckoo on a Choo Choo is a 1952 short subject directed by Jules White starring American slapstick comedy team The Three Stooges (Moe Howard, Larry Fine and Shemp Howard). It is the 143rd entry in the series released by Columbia Pictures starring the comedians, who released 190 shorts for the studio between 1934 and 1959.

== Plot ==
Larry and Shemp find refuge in a purloined railway car named Schmow. Larry harbors intentions of marrying his beloved Lenore, contingent upon Shemp marrying Lenore's sister, Roberta. Lenore insists on upholding her family's tradition, wherein the eldest daughter must marry first, and Shemp's substantial wealth is an additional incentive. However, Shemp's persistent inebriation and infatuation with an imaginary avian creature, Carrie, pose significant obstacles to his marriage prospects.

Meanwhile, Moe, a railway detective tasked with locating the missing car, chances upon the clandestine hideout. To his astonishment, Moe encounters Roberta, with whom he shares a prior romantic history. Overwhelmed by nostalgia, Moe endeavors to revive their dormant affection. Larry endeavors to sow discord between Moe and Shemp over Roberta's affections, yet Shemp remains steadfast in his devotion to Carrie. Subsequently, Moe forsakes his professional duties to pursue Roberta, culminating in a tumultuous entanglement.

The narrative concludes with Shemp, ensnared in his delusion, inadvertently incapacitating himself while pursuing his fanciful muse, Carrie.

== Cast ==
- Moe Howard as Moe & Radio announcer
- Larry Fine as Larry
- Shemp Howard as Shemp
- Patricia Wright as Lenore
- Victoria Horne as Roberta
- Reggie Dvorak as Carrie the canary

== Reception ==
Cuckoo on a Choo Choo has been dubbed one of the most original and unique shorts in the Stooge canon. However, fans and critics alike generally regard it as the worst Stooge comedy made.

== Production notes ==
Cuckoo on a Choo Choo was filmed on April 21–23, 1952. The plot is borrowed from two popular films of the period. The idea of a stolen railroad car is a parody of A Streetcar Named Desire, while the imaginary animal friend parodies the film Harvey (Victoria Horne had starred in the latter). The theme of a woman's unwillingness to marry until her sister can be found in a willing husband-to-be alludes to Kiss Me, Kate, a 1948 Cole Porter musical based on William Shakespeare's The Taming of the Shrew, which also had a 1953 MGM film adaptation.

This reportedly was one of Larry Fine's favorite shorts to watch repeatedly during his last years in the Motion Picture House. It is one of the only Stooge shorts in which he plays a different character than usual: tougher, more domineering, and speaking in a gravelly, mumbling voice in a broad parody of Marlon Brando as Stanley Kowalski in A Streetcar Named Desire.

Over the course of their 24 years at Columbia Pictures, the Stooges would occasionally be cast as separate characters. This course of action always worked against the team; author Jon Solomon concluded "when the writing divides them, they lose their comic dynamic." In addition to this split occurring in Cuckoo on a Choo Choo, the trio also played separate characters in Rockin' in the Rockies, He Cooked His Goose (and its remake Triple Crossed), Gypped in the Penthouse, Flying Saucer Daffy and Sweet and Hot.
