= Shot in the Frontier =

1954 American short film by Jules White

- Directed by: Jules White
- Written by: Felix Adler
- Produced by: Jules White
- Starring: Moe Howard; Larry Fine; Shemp Howard; Diana Darrin; Vivian Mason; Ruth Godfrey; Emmett Lynn; Kenneth MacDonald; Joe Palma; Emil Sitka
- Cinematography: Ray Cory
- Edited by: Edwin Bryant
- Distributed by: Columbia Pictures
- Release date: October 7, 1954 (U.S.)
- Running time: 15:52
- Country: United States
- Language: English

Shot in the Frontier is a 1954 short subject directed by Jules White starring American slapstick comedy team The Three Stooges (Moe Howard, Larry Fine and Shemp Howard). It is the 157th entry in the series released by Columbia Pictures starring the comedians, who released 190 shorts for the studio between 1934 and 1959.

== Plot ==
Following their matrimonial ceremonies, the Stooges are confronted with an unsettling revelation: the Noonan brothers, during the Stooges' recent absence, have developed an affection for the newlywed wives and sworn to exact vengeance upon our protagonists should the weddings transpire. Subsequently, in the aftermath of the Justice of the Peace's departure, the Stooges find themselves pursued by the Noonan brothers, leading to a comedic skirmish involving firearms and ultimately devolving into a physical altercation.

Amidst the chaos, an elderly individual named Lem inadvertently exacerbates the tension by persistently serenading both factions with an off-key rendition of "Red River Valley". Moe, reaching his threshold of patience, resorts to destroying Lem's guitar in frustration. Unperturbed, Lem promptly produces a miniature guitar and resumes his discordant performance, adding an element of absurdity to the escalating conflict.

== Cast ==
=== Credited ===
- Moe Howard as Moe
- Larry Fine as Larry
- Shemp Howard as Shemp

=== Uncredited ===
- Diana Darrin as Bella
- Vivian Mason as Ella
- Ruth Godfrey as Stella
- Emmett Lynn as Lem
- Kenneth MacDonald as Bill Noonan
- Joe Palma as Jack Noonan
- Emil Sitka as Justice of the Peace
- Mort Mills as Dick Noonan
- Wanda Perry as Wedding witness
- Harold Breen as Wedding witness
- Harriette Tarler as Mandy

== Production notes ==
Shot in the Frontier was filmed on October 26–28, 1953, nearly one year prior to its release. It is a parody of the 1952 Stanley Kramer Western High Noon.

In 1954, two shorts were released with entirely new footage: Income Tax Sappy and Shot in the Frontier. In both productions, Shemp Howard did not slick down his long hair due to his recent commencement of hair dyeing, which initially precluded the use of pomade.
