= He Cooked His Goose =

1952 American short film by Jules White

- Directed by: Jules White
- Written by: Felix Adler
- Produced by: Jules White
- Starring: Moe Howard; Larry Fine; Shemp Howard; Angela Stevens; Mary Ainslee; Theila Darin
- Cinematography: Fayte M. Browne
- Edited by: Aaron Stell
- Distributed by: Columbia Pictures
- Release date: July 3, 1952 (U.S.)
- Running time: 15:37
- Country: United States
- Language: English

He Cooked His Goose is a 1952 short subject produced and directed by Jules White starring American slapstick comedy team The Three Stooges (Moe Howard, Larry Fine and Shemp Howard). It is the 140th entry in the series released by Columbia Pictures starring the comedians, who released 190 shorts for the studio between 1934 and 1959.

== Plot ==
Larry engages in philandering behavior, embarking on an extramarital affair with Moe's wife, Belle, while also exhibiting romantic interest in Shemp's fiancée, Millie. Moe, upon discovering Larry's deceitful actions, confronts him at his pet shop, expressing his displeasure. Employing quick thinking, Larry manipulates the situation to persuade Moe of his innocence, thereby quelling Moe's anger. Recognizing the need to deflect blame, Larry implicates Shemp as the culprit.

Subsequently, Larry secures a job for Shemp as an underwear salesman, orchestrating a scenario where Shemp visits Moe's residence to showcase his merchandise to Belle. Exploiting the opportunity, Larry deceitfully contacts both Millie and Moe, fabricating tales of Shemp's advances towards Moe's wife. Incensed by the misinformation, Millie and Moe rush to Moe's home, with Moe brandishing a loaded firearm. Fearing for his safety, Shemp eludes capture by fleeing up the chimney. Capitalizing on the festive season, Shemp disguises himself as Santa Claus to deceive Moe before making his escape.

Meanwhile, Shemp encounters Larry, realizing his complicity in the scheme. In retaliation, Shemp incapacitates Larry and disguises him as Santa Claus, intending to mislead Moe, Millie, and Moe's wife. Unveiling the ruse, Moe pursues Larry, ultimately resorting to gunfire. However, in a series of misfortunes, Moe inadvertently shoots himself in the foot while celebrating the apparent resolution of the situation.

== Cast ==
=== Credited ===
- Moe Howard as Moe
- Larry Fine as Larry
- Shemp Howard as Shemp
- Mary Ainslee as Belle
- Angela Stevens as Millie
- Theila Darin as Miss Lapdale

=== Uncredited ===
- Johnny Kascier as Waiter/Moe's stand-in
- Charles Cross as Larry's stand-in
- Harold Breen as Shemp's stand-in

== Production notes ==
He Cooked His Goose was reworked in 1959 as Triple Crossed, using ample stock footage from the original. It is one of only three films in which Larry Fine is the main character. The other two where he takes the lead role are Woman Haters and Three Loan Wolves.

He Cooked His Goose was filmed on January 7–9, 1952 when Christmas trees were available, but not released until July. When Belle answers the door for Shemp, the Christmas tree she was hanging earlier with Moe is missing.

Over the course of their 24 years at Columbia Pictures, the Stooges would occasionally be cast as separate characters. This course of action always worked against the team; author Jon Solomon concluded "when the writing divides them, they lose their comic dynamic". In addition to this split occurring in He Cooked His Goose (and its remake Triple Crossed), the trio also played separate characters in Rockin' in the Rockies, Cuckoo on a Choo Choo, Gypped in the Penthouse, Flying Saucer Daffy and Sweet and Hot, this was also the last Three Stooges short that was filmed before Curly Howard's death.
