= Let's Fall in Love =

1933 song by Harold Arlen (music) and Ted Koehler (lyrics)

Song by Art Jarrett and Ann Sothern
- Published: 1933 by Irving Berlin, Inc.
- Songwriters: Harold Arlen and Ted Koehler

"Let's Fall in Love" is a song written by Harold Arlen (music) and Ted Koehler (lyrics) for the film Let's Fall in Love and published in 1933. In the film, it is heard during the opening credits and later sung by Art Jarrett and chorus, and by Ann Sothern.

The major hit at the time of introduction was by Eddy Duchin (vocal by Lew Sherwood). It was originally written in C major with a "Moderately Bright" tempo marking. As a jazz standard, it is usually played with a medium swing beat.

== Other notable recordings ==
- Annette Hanshaw, Feb 3, 1934, New York City, Vocalion 2635.
- Vic Damone - That Towering Feeling! (1956)
- Tony Middleton and the Willows recorded an uptempo doo-wop version of the song in 1957, which was released on Gone #5015.
- Ella Fitzgerald - Ella Fitzgerald Sings Sweet Songs for Swingers (1959), accompanied by the Frank De Vol Orchestra. She recorded it again with Billy May and a full orchestra for Ella Fitzgerald Sings the Harold Arlen Songbook (1961).
- Louis Armstrong and Oscar Peterson recorded for their 1959 album, Louis Armstrong Meets Oscar Peterson.
- Frank Sinatra - Ring-a-Ding-Ding!, Johnny Mandel - arranger, conductor, 1961.
- Shirley Bassey - for her album Let's Face the Music (1962)
- Linda Scott released a cover of the song as a single in 1963 that reached #108 on the Billboard chart.
- Soul duo Peaches & Herb recorded a cover of the song in 1966, which went to #11 on the US R&B singles chart and #21 on the Hot 100.
- Robin Sarstedt had a hit with it in the Benelux countries in 1976.
- Diana Krall released it on When I Look in Your Eyes (1999)

== Popular culture ==
- The film Slightly French (1949) features the song as the central love theme and it is sung by Don Ameche and Dorothy Lamour.
- The film It Should Happen to You (1954) features the song as the central love theme between Jack Lemmon and Judy Holliday, who sing it several times interspersed with dialogue, and hum it together at the end.
- Muriel Landers sings the song in the 1958 Columbia Pictures Three Stooges comedy short Sweet and Hot.
- Pat Collins, the hip hypnotist, sings a portion of the song in the 1967 Columbia Pictures release Divorce American Style.

== In popular culture ==
The Shirley Basset cover of "Let's Fall in Love" appears in the British dark comedy film Plots with a View (2002).
