= Sweet and Hot =

1958 film by Jules White

- Directed by: Jules White
- Screenplay by: Jerome S. Gottler; Jack White
- Story by: Jerome S. Gottler
- Produced by: Jules White
- Starring: Moe Howard; Larry Fine; Joe Besser; Muriel Landers
- Cinematography: Irving Lippman
- Edited by: Edwin H. Bryant
- Distributed by: Columbia Pictures
- Release date: September 4, 1958 (U.S.)
- Running time: 16:22
- Country: United States
- Language: English

Sweet and Hot is a 1958 short subject directed by Jules White starring American slapstick comedy team The Three Stooges (Moe Howard, Larry Fine and Joe Besser). It is the 186th entry in the series released by Columbia Pictures starring the comedians, who released 190 shorts for the studio between 1934 and 1959.

== Plot ==
Renowned producer Larry revisits his hometown, a small agricultural community, where he encounters his childhood friends Joe and sister Tiny diligently tending to their family farm. Notably, Tiny's exceptional vocal talent captivates Larry as she sings, prompting even the barnyard animals to sway in rhythm to her melodies. Impressed by her skill, Larry extends an invitation for Joe and Tiny to join him in his nightclub act in New York City.

However, Larry learns that Tiny harbors a deep-seated fear of performing in front of live audiences, which impedes her ability to seize this opportunity. Determined to help her overcome this obstacle, Larry and Joe accompany Tiny to seek professional assistance from a German psychiatrist renowned for his expertise in hypnotherapy.

Under the psychiatrist's guidance, Tiny undergoes hypnosis to delve into the root cause of her fear. Through this therapeutic process, Tiny recounts a childhood trauma stemming from an incident in the family barn, where she was pressured by her father and uncles to perform her musical talents. Overwhelmed by their expectations, Tiny retreated into a state of fear and reluctance to sing further.

With the psychiatrist's guidance, Tiny confronts her fears and acknowledges the love and appreciation her audience holds for her singing. Through the power of suggestion, Tiny emerges from hypnosis with newfound confidence and resolve to pursue her passion for singing professionally.

Ultimately, Tiny makes her debut as a professional singer, accompanied by Joe's dance performances and Larry's musical accompaniment on the violin. As the audience responds with applause, Tiny experiences a sense of fulfillment and joy, marking a significant milestone in her artistic journey.

== Cast ==
- Moe Howard as Dr. Hugo Gansamacher, Horace
- Larry Fine as Larry, Uncle Louie
- Joe Besser as Joe, Uncle Joe
- Muriel Landers as Tiny

== Production notes ==
Sweet and Hot was filmed over two days on August 22–23, 1957. Closing musical number "The Heat is On" featuring Landers performing alone was stock footage taken from her own solo 1957 Columbia short Tricky Chicks. The shot of a duck quacking was lifted from I'm a Monkey's Uncle.

Sweet and Hot features Moe and Larry's more "gentlemanly" haircuts, first suggested by Joe Besser. However, these had to be used sparingly, as half of the shorts with Besser were remakes of earlier films, and new footage had to be matched with old.

Over the course of their 23 years at Columbia Pictures, the Stooges would occasionally be cast as separate characters. Sweet and Hot is a throwback to the Stooges' very first Columbia short, Woman Haters (1934), with the same musical-comedy format used by the same screenwriter, Jerome S. Gottler. This course of action always worked against the team; author Jon Solomon concluded "when the writing divides them, they lose their comic dynamic." The trio also played separate characters in the feature film Rockin' in the Rockies and the short subjects Cuckoo on a Choo Choo, Flying Saucer Daffy, Gypped in the Penthouse, He Cooked His Goose, and its remake Triple Crossed.

Moe uses a heavy German accent to play the psychiatrist, the same one he used to mock Adolf Hitler in You Nazty Spy! and They Stooge to Conga over a decade earlier.

== See also ==
- List of American films of 1958
