= Flying Saucer Daffy =

1958 film by Jules White

- Directed by: Jules White
- Written by: Jack White
- Produced by: Jules White
- Starring: Moe Howard; Larry Fine; Joe Besser; Gail Bonney; Emil Sitka; Harriette Tarler; Diana Darrin; Bek Nelson; Joe Palma; Billy Engle
- Cinematography: Fred Jackman Jr.
- Edited by: Saul A. Goodkind
- Distributed by: Columbia Pictures
- Release date: October 9, 1958 (U.S.)
- Running time: 16:14
- Country: United States
- Language: English

Flying Saucer Daffy is a 1958 short subject directed by Jules White starring American slapstick comedy team The Three Stooges (Moe Howard, Larry Fine and Joe Besser). It is the 187th entry in the series released by Columbia Pictures starring the comedians, who released 190 shorts for the studio between 1934 and 1959.

== Plot ==
In a narrative parallel reminiscent of the Cinderella archetype, Joe finds himself subjected to servitude under the guardianship of his aunt and two indolent cousins, Moe and Larry. During a camping excursion, Joe inadvertently captures a photograph of a paper plate carried aloft by a gust of wind, which is misconstrued as an image of an Unidentified Flying Object (UFO). Seizing the opportunity, Moe and Larry appropriate credit for the photograph and reap substantial financial gain, relegating Joe to the position of their subordinate.

However, their ill-gotten acclaim proves short-lived as the veracity of the UFO picture is debunked by governmental authorities, leading to the arrest of Moe and Larry for perpetrating a hoax. Incensed by Joe's unwitting role in their downfall, the aunt expels him from their household. Seeking solace in solitude, Joe embarks on a solitary camping expedition, where he encounters authentic extraterrestrial beings from Planet Zircon.

In a fortuitous turn of events, Joe is granted the opportunity to photograph the genuine aliens, a discovery that holds significant implications. Meanwhile, Moe and Larry, temporarily released from incarceration under probationary terms, face the daunting task of repaying the government for their fraudulent scheme.

Upon Joe's return with evidence of his encounter, his triumphant revelation is met with skepticism and physical aggression from his incredulous relatives. Undeterred, Joe musters the strength to defend himself, rendering Moe, Larry, and their elderly relative unconscious. Subsequently hailed as a national hero, Joe is lauded for his photographic achievement, symbolized by a celebratory ticker-tape parade alongside his beautiful extraterrestrial companions.

In stark contrast, Moe and Larry face the consequences of their actions, being confined to straitjackets and institutionalized within a psychiatric facility, marking a stark divergence in their respective trajectories following the UFO debacle.

== Production notes ==
Flying Saucer Daffy features Moe and Larry's more "gentlemanly" haircuts, first suggested by Joe Besser. However, these had to be used sparingly, as most of the shorts with Besser were remakes of earlier films, and new footage had to be matched with old. Besser later reported that Flying Saucer Daffy was his favorite Stooge comedy. The short features stock footage from Earth vs. the Flying Saucers.

Over the course of their careers at Columbia Pictures, the Stooges would very occasionally be cast as separate characters. Author Jon Solomon contends that this course of action worked against the team: "When the writing divides them, they lose their comic dynamic." In addition to this split occurring in Flying Saucer Daffy, the trio also played separate characters in Woman Haters, He Cooked His Goose (and its remake Triple Crossed), Gypped in the Penthouse, Cuckoo on a Choo Choo and Sweet and Hot, as well as the feature film Rockin' in the Rockies.

=== End of an era ===
Though Flying Saucer Daffy was not the last short subject released by the Stooges (that honor goes to Sappy Bull Fighters), it was the last one produced. Filming took place on December 19–20, 1957. Several hours after filming wrapped, the two-reel-comedy unit shut down and the Stooges were unceremoniously fired from Columbia Pictures after 24 years. Joan Howard Maurer, daughter of Moe Howard, wrote the following in 1982:

"The boys' careers had suddenly come to an end. They were at Columbia one day and gone the next—no 'Thank yous,' no farewell party for their 24 years of dedication and service and the dollars their comedies had reaped for the studio. Moe Howard recalled that a few weeks after their exit from Columbia, he drove to the studio to say goodbye to several studio executives when he was stopped by a guard at the gate (obviously, not a Stooges fan) and, since he did not have the current year's studio pass, was refused entry. For the moment, it was a crushing blow."

== See also ==
- List of American films of 1958
