= Triple Crossed (1959 film) =

1959 film by Jules White

- Directed by: Jules White
- Written by: Warren Wilson
- Produced by: Jules White
- Starring: Moe Howard; Larry Fine; Joe Besser; Angela Stevens; Mary Ainsley; Diana Darrin; Shemp Howard; Connie Cezon; Johnny Kascier
- Cinematography: Fred Jackman Jr.
- Edited by: Saul A. Goodkind
- Distributed by: Columbia Pictures
- Release date: February 2, 1959 (U.S.)
- Running time: 15:52
- Country: United States
- Language: English

Triple Crossed is a 1959 short subject directed by Jules White starring American slapstick comedy team The Three Stooges (Moe Howard, Larry Fine and Joe Besser). It is the 189th entry in the series released by Columbia Pictures starring the comedians, who released 190 shorts for the studio between 1934 and 1959.

== Plot ==
Larry exhibits promiscuous behavior, engaging in an extramarital affair with Moe's spouse, Belle, while simultaneously displaying romantic interest in Joe's betrothed, Millie. Upon discovering Larry's deceitful conduct, Moe confronts him at his place of employment, a pet shop, expressing his displeasure before Larry manages to placate him. Sensing the need to deflect blame, Larry orchestrates a scheme implicating Joe as the perpetrator.

To this end, Larry secures a position for Joe as an underwear salesman, strategically arranging for his initial visit to be at Moe's residence. In a duplicitous maneuver, Larry fabricates falsehoods to incite Moe's wrath, alleging Joe's inappropriate advances toward Millie. Incensed, Moe and Joe embark on a confrontation at Moe's domicile, prompting Joe's evasive action by scaling the chimney to evade detection. Subsequently, Joe discreetly absconds from the scene and encounters Larry, ultimately exposing his culpability to Moe.

In a candid revelation, Joe divulges Larry's treachery to Moe, elucidating the scheme orchestrated by Larry to frame him. Millie corroborates Joe's account, disclosing Larry's manipulative tactics employed to lure her to the scene. Recognizing Larry's duplicity, Moe directs his ire towards him, while Joe and Millie reconcile their differences, amidst Moe's reprimand of Larry for his deceitful machinations.

== Cast ==
=== Credited ===
- Moe Howard as Moe
- Larry Fine as Larry
- Joe Besser as Joe
- Angela Stevens as Millie
- Mary Ainsley as Belle (stock footage)
  - Connie Cezon as Belle (new footage)
- Diana Darrin as Miss Lapdale (stock footage)

=== Uncredited ===
- Johnny Kascier as Waiter (stock footage)

== Production notes ==
Triple Crossed is a remake of 1952's He Cooked His Goose, using ample stock footage. New footage was filmed on December 12–13, 1957.

When Moe shoots at Joe up the chimney, Shemp Howard's yell from He Cooked His Goose can be heard. In a cost-saving measure, Joe Besser's voice was not dubbed over Shemp's for authenticity. In addition, when Larry is walking in the hallway from the elevator to meet Moe’s wife, Joe is hiding in the closet wearing a Santa Claus outfit; however, it is Shemp who is whistling at Larry. Also, Shemp’s face can be seen in the background peeking from underneath the bearskin rug and can be seen when he opens the janitor closet door and slams Larry in the hallway.

Over the course of their 24 years at Columbia Pictures, the Stooges would occasionally be cast as separate characters. This course of action always worked against the team; author Jon Solomon concluded "when the writing divides them, they lose their comic dynamic." In addition to this split occurring in Triple Crossed (as well as He Cooked His Goose, the film it originated from), the trio also played separate characters in Rockin' in the Rockies, Cuckoo on a Choo Choo, Gypped in the Penthouse, Flying Saucer Daffy and Sweet and Hot.
