= Hoofs and Goofs =

1957 film by Jules White

- Directed by: Jules White
- Written by: Jack White
- Produced by: Jules White
- Starring: Moe Howard; Larry Fine; Joe Besser; Harriette Tarler; Benny Rubin; Tony the Wonder Horse; Joe Palma; Ruth Godfrey White
- Cinematography: Gert Andersen
- Edited by: Harold White
- Distributed by: Columbia Pictures
- Release date: January 31, 1957 (U.S.)
- Running time: 15:27
- Country: United States
- Language: English

Hoofs and Goofs is a 1957 short subject directed by Jules White starring American slapstick comedy team The Three Stooges (Moe Howard, Larry Fine, and Joe Besser in his first starring role with the act). It is the 175th entry in the series released by Columbia Pictures starring the comedians, who released 190 shorts for the studio between 1934 and 1959.

== Plot ==
Joe finds himself unable to shake thoughts of his departed sister, Birdie. In a gesture of camaraderie, Moe and Larry play along with Joe's belief that Birdie will manifest herself downtown the next day. Upon their excursion, the trio encounters a horse purportedly embodying Birdie's reincarnation, much to the astonishment of Moe and Larry.

Filled with jubilation, the Stooges endeavor to persuade their equine "sister" to accompany them home. Initially resistant, Birdie eventually relents. However, their joy is short-lived as they discover Birdie's impending motherhood. Joe's reaction is one of frantic preparation for the forthcoming arrival of the newborn foal. Meanwhile, the clattering of Birdie's hooves draws the attention of their landlord, Mr. Dinklespiel, and his daughter, residing below.

Confronted by Mr. Dinklespiel, Moe attempts to deceive him into believing the commotion stems from innocuous sources. Once the landlord departs, Birdie gives birth to a colt, prompting Joe's exuberant declaration of unclehood. Yet, his elation is abruptly interrupted by Moe and Larry, awakening him from what transpires to be a dream sequence.

In reality, Birdie (portrayed by Moe in feminine attire) remains alive and well, residing with the Stooges. Joe, recounting his dream to Birdie, inadvertently offends her by likening her to a horse, resulting in a humorous retaliation involving a casserole deposited atop Joe's head.

== Cast ==
=== Credited ===
- Moe Howard as Moe/Birdie
- Larry Fine as Larry
- Joe Besser as Joe
- Harriette Tarler as Dinklespiel's daughter
- Benny Rubin as Mr. Dinklespiel
- Tony the Wonder Horse as Birdie

=== Uncredited ===
- Ruth Godfrey White as Birdie (voice)
- Joe Palma as drunk man

== Production notes ==
Hoofs and Goofs is the first Three Stooges short featuring Joe Besser as the third Stooge; filming was completed April 18–20, 1956. According to Besser's autobiography Not Just a Stooge, Besser spoke to Moe shortly before filming to convey his condolences over the death of Shemp Howard the year before. Joe and Shemp had been good friends.

The film's original ending was to have the Stooges' sister, Birdie, hit Joe with a rolling pin. However, due to his not wanting to be hit in the head with a solid prop, it was changed to a casserole.

The film makes reference to actress Kim Novak, when spoken by the reincarnated Birdie.

A direct sequel, Horsing Around, was released on September 12, 1957.

== See also ==
- List of films about horses
- List of American films of 1957
