= Space Ship Sappy =

1957 film by Jules White

- Directed by: Jules White
- Written by: Jack White
- Produced by: Jules White
- Starring: Moe Howard; Larry Fine; Joe Besser; Benny Rubin; Doreen Woodbury; Emil Sitka; Lorraine Crawford; Harriette Tarler; Marilyn Hanold
- Cinematography: Henry Freulich
- Edited by: Saul A. Goodkind
- Distributed by: Columbia Pictures
- Release date: April 18, 1957 (U.S.)
- Running time: 16:15
- Country: United States
- Language: English

Space Ship Sappy is a 1957 short subject directed by Jules White starring American slapstick comedy team The Three Stooges (Moe Howard, Larry Fine and Joe Besser). It is the 178th entry in the series released by Columbia Pictures starring the comedians, who released 190 shorts for the studio between 1934 and 1959.

== Plot ==
The Stooges meet up with Professor A.K. Rimple, an eccentric figure, and his daughter, who solicit the trio's assistance in a space expedition. Embarking on the mission, they arrive at the planet Sunev (a reverse spelling of Venus), where they encounter three captivating female extraterrestrials. Initially, an amicable interaction ensues, marked by literal sparks when the aliens bestow kisses upon the Stooges. However, the situation takes a perilous turn as the female beings exhibit cannibalistic tendencies, threatening to extract the Stooges' blood.

Despite the impending danger, the Stooges manage a daring escape when a colossal lizard emerges on the horizon, causing the alien women to flee. Hastily reboarding the rocket ship, they inadvertently render the Professor and his daughter unconscious before departing for Earth. Upon their return, the Stooges regale an assembled audience with the tale of their interstellar escapade. However, their account is met with skepticism, and they are mockingly bestowed with an accolade by the Liars Club, recognizing them as the preeminent purveyors of tall tales.

== Cast ==
- Moe Howard as Moe
- Larry Fine as Larry
- Joe Besser as Joe
- Benny Rubin as Professor A. K. Rimple
- Doreen Woodbury as Lisa Rimple
- Lorraine Crawford as Fauna
- Marilyn Hanold as Flora
- Harriette Tarler as 3rd Amazon
- Emil Sitka as Liars Club MC

== Production notes ==
Space Ship Sappy was filmed on August 27–29, 1956. 49-year-old Joe Besser suffered a mild heart attack shortly after filming was completed. Production of the Stooge shorts went on hiatus to allow Besser time to recover. Production eventually resumed on November 19 with Horsing Around.

Space Ship Sappy features Moe and Larry's more "gentlemanly" haircuts, first suggested by Joe Besser. However, these had to be used sparingly, as most of the shorts with Besser were remakes of earlier films, and new footage had to be matched with old. Larry mentions Elvis Presley.
