= Paul Richards (actor) =

American actor (1924–1974)

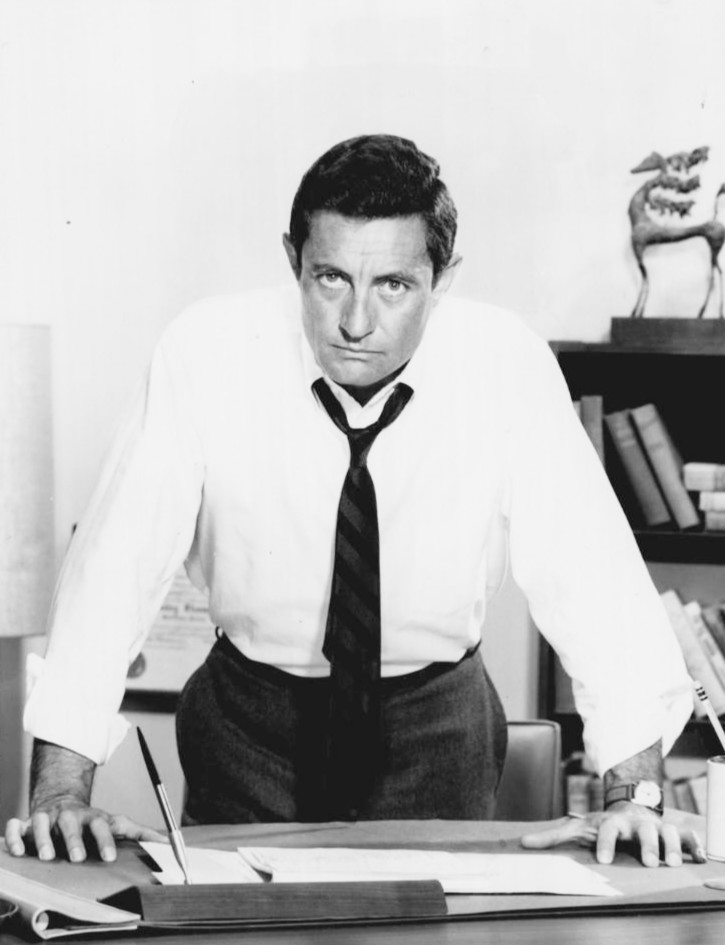
- Richards in Breaking Point (1963)
- Born: Paul Richard Levitt; November 10, 1924; Hollywood, California, U.S.
- Died: December 10, 1974 (aged 50); Culver City, California, U.S.
- Resting place: Hillside Memorial Park Cemetery
- Occupation: Actor
- Years active: 1951–1974
- Spouses: Paula Morgan m. 1948; div. ?; Monica Keating m. 1950

Paul Richards (born Paul Richard Levitt; November 10, 1924 – December 10, 1974) was an American actor who appeared in films and on television in the 1950s, 1960s, and 1970s.

== Early years ==
A native of Hollywood, Richards earned a psychology degree at University of California, Los Angeles and a master's degree in drama, also from UCLA. He gained additional acting experience at the Theatre Wing in New York.

== Career ==
He guest-starred in television western series such as Tales of Wells Fargo Season 2, Episode 28, "The Johnny Ringo Story". The Rifleman as Sam Morley in S1 E24 "The Trade" (1959), Have Gun – Will Travel, Highway Patrol (1956), Zorro, Johnny Ringo, The Rebel, Zane Grey Theatre, Tombstone Territory, Black Saddle, Gunsmoke, Bonanza, The Untouchables,Trackdown, Rawhide, The Virginian, The Loner, and The Guns of Will Sonnett. One of his first TV appearances came in the Lassie episode “Blind Soldier” (1955) in which he played a blind veteran needing a dog to readjust to life.

Richards guest-starred in four episodes of Gunsmoke. In 1955, in the series' first episode, "Matt Gets It", he portrays a near-sighted gunfighter who outdraws and nearly kills Matt Dillon. The next year, in "Mr. and Mrs. Amber", he portrayed a poor, desperate homesteader beleaguered by his rich, self-righteous brother-in-law. In 1958, he played an impostor U.S. Marshal in the episode "Joe Phy". He made his last appearance as Mel Deevers in the 1968 episode "The Jackals".

He also appeared in the syndicated series The Sheriff of Cochise and The Silent Service. He was a guest star on Kenneth Tobey's Whirlybirds, a syndicated aviation adventure series. He appeared on The Brothers Brannagan, with Stephen Dunne and Mark Roberts. He made guest appearances on Straightaway and on Dragnet. In the 1955 episode "The Big Bird," Richards played Phil Baurch, who stole from people's homes after being hired out to do yard work.

In 1959, he appeared in a five-part episode "Louie K" in the role of Louis "Louie" Kassoff in The Lawless Years with James Gregory. In the March 3, 1961 episode "An Absence of Tears" on the popular TV show Route 66, he did a turn as a mob connected bad boy and ex-love to a blind girl looking for revenge against mobsters who murdered her Honeymoon Husband. "He also appeared in Dan Raven, a crime drama, and the anthology series The Lloyd Bridges Show in the 1962 episode "Testing Ground". On Perry Mason, in 1959, he played actor and make-up artist Earl Mauldin in "The Case of the Startled Stallion", then played defendant Ted Chase in the 1962 episode "The Case of the Melancholy Marksman" (in 1973 Richards played Jules Barron in The New Perry Mason episode "The Case of the Cagey Cager"). In summer 1960, he appeared on Tate. In 1962, he portrayed Vance Caldwell in "The Boss's Daughters" on Rawhide. Also in 1962, he played the part of Dr. Max Richter on the Death Valley Days episode "Bloodline".

He starred as Dr. McKinley Thompson in the 1963-1964 medical drama Breaking Point. He appeared in the 1964 episode "Murder by Scandal" of the drama The Reporter. He appeared in a 1964 episode of The Fugitive titled "A.P.B.". He later appeared as a villainous lawyer in a 1968 episode of Hawaii Five-O, titled "Twenty-four Karat Kill".

Richards guest-starred in 1960s and 1970s television series, including Burke's Law, I Spy, Mannix, Banacek, McMillan and Wife, and three appearances on The Mod Squad between 1969 and 1972. Richards appeared primarily in dramas, but made turns into comedy, as well, appearing in "The Town Tamer" episode of Tim Conway's 1967 western sitcom Rango, and in a 1969 episode of Get Smart as a villain named Ironhands.

He appeared as the mutant leader Mendez in the 1970 science-fiction film Beneath the Planet of the Apes. One of his minor film roles was a prisoner in Demetrius and the Gladiators, a sequel to 20th Century Fox's biblical epic The Robe.

For several years, Richards served as the commercial pitchman for General Motors' Pontiac Division, doing commercials for several of its cars, including the GTO and Firebird. He was a commercial spokesman for Braniff Airways in 1965 and starred in the Airline's historic End of the Plain Plane television commercial. In the early 1970s, he was a commercial spokesman for American Express. Richards narrated the Academy Award-nominated documentary Monument to the Dream about the construction of the Gateway Arch in St. Louis, Missouri.

== Personal life ==
Richards married twice; first in 1948 to actress Paula Morgan (née Miriam Spiegelman), and, from 1950 until his death, to actress Monica Keating.

== Death ==
On December 10, 1974, Richards died from cancer in Los Angeles, survived by his wife, as well as his mother Edith Grossman and his sister, Mrs. Howard Gluck. His remains are interred at Hillside Memorial Park Cemetery.

== Partial filmography ==
- Fixed Bayonets! (1951) - Ramirez (uncredited)
- War Paint (1953) - Trooper Perkins
- Hell and High Water (1954) - Prisoner (uncredited)
- Phantom of the Rue Morgue (1954) - Rene the Knife-thrower
- Playgirl (1954) - Wilbur
- Demetrius and the Gladiators (1954) - Prisoner (uncredited)
- Pushover (1954) - Harry Wheeler (uncredited)
- The Silver Chalice (1954) - Tigellinus (uncredited)
- Kiss Me Deadly (1955) - Attacker
- Tall Man Riding (1955) - The Peso Kid
- The Houston Story (1956) - Gordon Shay
- Tension at Table Rock (1956) - Sam Murdock
- Scandal Incorporated (1956) - Martin Ellis
- The Black Whip (1956) - John Murdock
- Hot Summer Night (1957) - Elly Horn
- Monkey on My Back (1957) - Rico
- The Unknown Terror (1957) - Peter Morgan
- Blood Arrow (1958) - Brill
- Four Fast Guns (1960) - Hoag
- All the Young Men (1960) - Pvt. Bracken
- Bonanza (TV) (1961) - Trock (S3:E4, "The Lonely House")
- Savage Justice (1967) - Rob MacRoy
- The St. Valentine's Day Massacre (1967) - Charles Fischetti
- Beneath the Planet of the Apes (1970) - Mendez
- Triangle (1970) - Dr. Victor Enfield
- I Escaped from Devil's Island (1973) - Maj. Marteau
