= The Broken Land =

1962 film by John A. Bushelman

- Theatrical release poster
- Directed by: John A. Bushelman
- Written by: Edward J. Lakso
- Produced by: Leonard A. Schwartz
- Starring: Kent Taylor; Jack Nicholson; Diana Darrin
- Cinematography: Floyd Crosby
- Edited by: Carl Pierson
- Music by: Richard LaSalle
- Production company: Associated Producers Inc (API)
- Distributed by: 20th Century Fox
- Release date: April 1, 1962
- Running time: 60 minutes
- Country: United States
- Language: English

The Broken Land is a 1962 CinemaScope DeLuxe Western film directed by John A. Bushelman, and starring Kent Taylor, Diana Darrin and Jack Nicholson.

== Plot ==
An on-screen intro tells us that the film is set in the late 1870s, when some people, “branded by the war, the land, the violence...wandered alone – drifting into oblivion,” and this is the story of four such people.

Gabe Dunson, a drifter, rides into a small town. He encounters Billy, a naïve young man who works at the general store and has a crush on Marva Aikens. Dunson then meets Marva at the restaurant where she's a waitress. As Gabe is eating, Jim Cogan, the town's marshal enters and sees Marva. We find out that Cogan knows Marva from sometime in the past and wants her to leave town as soon as possible.

Later Billy attempts to give Marva a necklace from the general store, but Cogan thinks Billy has stolen the necklace and tries to arrest him. Billy, frightened of jail, tries to run and Cogan pulls his gun to shoot him. Dunson stops him and the two men fight. Billy and Dunson are both arrested and thrown into jail with Will Broicous, the son of a famous gunfighter who has been arrested because of his last name.

Before she leaves town on the stage, Marva comes to the jail and helps the three men escape. Knowing the marshal will arrest Marva once he learns what she's done, the men chase down the stage to get her off it. The stagecoach driver, thinking it's a holdup, also gives the men a bag of money he's carrying for the bank. Now on the run as both escapees and holdup men, the group rides through the prairie pursued by the sheriff, his deputy and two townsmen. Gabe and Billy get the drop on the posse, take their guns and give them back the money, explaining that they only wanted Marva.

Cogan and the posse stop the stage to give them back the money, then Cogan tells the driver and guard to give their guns to him and his deputy so they can go after Dunson and the others. The deputy objects, holding a gun on Cogan and saying he's tried of the marshal's cruelty. Cogan shoots the deputy and goes after Dunson and the others alone.

Cogan finds them, sneaks up on Billy and stabs him in the back, then arrests the other three. But when Cogan gets them back to town, the townspeople have heard about him killing the deputy. As the townspeople turn on Cogan, Marva reveals that during the war he was a Union soldier who declared martial law in her town and abused his authority as he has done in this town as marshal. Broicous then tells them that Cogan killed Billy with a knife in the back, and Dunson takes Cogan's gun and beats him down. As Cogan lies unconscious, the mayor fires him, orders him arrested, and frees Dunson, Broicous and Marva.

== Cast ==
- Kent Taylor as Marshal Jim Cogan
- Diana Darrin as Marva
- Jody McCrea as Deputy Ed Flynn
- Robert Sampson as Gabe Dunson
- Jack Nicholson as Will Broicous
- Gary Sneed as Billy
- Don Orlando as Frenchy Douchette
- Helen Joseph as Ruth Flynn
- H. Tom Cain as Mr. Flynn
- Robert Hinkle as Dave
- Bob Pollard as Stagecoach Driver

== Production ==
The film was filmed in Apache Junction, Arizona during the summer of 1961. It was financed by Robert L. Lippert's Associated Producers. It gave an early role to Jack Nicholson. Nicholson later appeared in and wrote a number of films for Lippert, including Thunder Island.

== Reception ==
Reviewing the film in 2015 for the cinephile website Once Upon a Time in a Western, Mark Franklin wrote:

Some folks will likely want to watch this because of Nicholson's involvement. It actually marked his sixth appearance on the big screen. He'd fair better in the twin 1966 Westerns The Shooting and Ride in the Whirlwind.

As the female lead, this was an unusually large role for Diana Darrin, who normally wound up in supporting parts. And, yep, that’s Joel McCrea’s son, Jody, as the deputy who turns on Cogan because of his cruelty. Another problem with the film: Cogan doesn’t seem all that cruel.
