= From Nurse to Worse =

1940 American short film by Jules White

- Directed by: Jules White
- Screenplay by: Clyde Bruckman
- Story by: Charles L. Kimball
- Produced by: Jules White
- Starring: Moe Howard; Larry Fine; Curly Howard; Lynton Brent; Vernon Dent; Dudley Dickerson; Dorothy Appleby; Ned Glass; Cy Schindell; John Tyrrell; Al Thompson; Joe Palma
- Cinematography: Benjamin H. Kline
- Edited by: Mel Thorsen
- Distributed by: Columbia Pictures
- Release date: August 23, 1940 (U.S.)
- Running time: 16:43
- Country: United States
- Language: English

From Nurse to Worse is a 1940 short subject directed by Jules White starring American slapstick comedy team The Three Stooges (Moe Howard, Larry Fine and Curly Howard). It is the 49th entry in the series released by Columbia Pictures starring the comedians, who released 190 shorts for the studio between 1934 and 1959.

== Plot ==
The Stooges are paper hangers who encounter their acquaintance Jerry, an insurance salesman, who proposes a scheme wherein they can receive $500 monthly by taking out a policy on Curly, alleging insanity. Moe and Larry escort Curly, who is disguised as a dog, to Dr. D. Lerious's office for an assessment. However, Curly's exaggerated portrayal results in the doctor recommending surgical intervention. Fleeing from the impending operation, the Stooges seek refuge in a dog catcher's truck, unwittingly subjecting themselves to a flea infestation.

Their escapade takes a dramatic turn when Dr. D. Lerious apprehends them, leading to Curly's imminent surgery. In a stroke of luck, the trio manages to escape on a gurney, encountering Jerry once more, whereupon they exact their retribution.

== Cast ==
=== Credited ===
- Moe Howard as Moe
- Larry Fine as Larry
- Curly Howard as Curly

=== Uncredited ===
- Lynton Brent as Jerry
- Vernon Dent as Dr. D. Lerious
- Dudley Dickerson as orderly
- Dorothy Appleby as Dr. D. Lerious' receptionist
- Evelyn Young as woman in Dr. D. Lerious' office
- Ned Glass as dog catcher
- Charles Dorety as dog catcher
- Cy Schindell as policeman
- John Tyrrell as assistant surgeon
- Blanche Payson as hospital admissions nurse
- Al Thompson as orderly
- Johnny Kascier as battered orderly
- Joe Palma as male nurse

== Production notes ==
From Nurse to Worse was filmed on May 15–18, 1940. The film marked the first appearance of supporting player Joe Palma in a Stooge film.

The footage of the Stooges sailing through the city streets was lifted from Dizzy Doctors. The voice on the police scanner is Moe's.
