= Hokus Pokus (1949 film) =

1949 film by Jules White

- Directed by: Jules White
- Written by: Felix Adler
- Produced by: Jules White
- Starring: Moe Howard; Larry Fine; Shemp Howard; Mary Ainslee; David Bond; Vernon Dent; Ned Glass; Jimmy Lloyd
- Cinematography: Vincent J. Farrar
- Edited by: Edwin H. Bryant
- Distributed by: Columbia Pictures
- Release date: May 5, 1949 (U.S.)
- Running time: 16:21
- Country: United States
- Language: English

Hokus Pokus is a 1949 short subject directed by Jules White starring American slapstick comedy team The Three Stooges (Moe Howard, Larry Fine and Shemp Howard). It is the 115th entry in the series released by Columbia Pictures starring the comedians, who released 190 shorts for the studio between 1934 and 1959.

== Plot ==
The Stooges are employed as paperhangers who concurrently attend to the care of Mary, an invalid purportedly unable to walk. However, Mary's apparent physical limitations belie her clandestine scheme to defraud her insurance company of $25,000 by feigning disability. Amidst their professional duties of affixing posters, the Stooges chance upon an advertisement promoting the services of a renowned hypnotist, Svengarlic, renowned for his purported ability to elicit profound transformations in individuals.

Motivated by altruistic intentions, the Stooges seek Svengarlic's assistance in facilitating Mary's purported recovery. However, Svengarlic's ulterior motives manifest as he prioritizes mesmerizing the Stooges for the entertainment of an audience. Succumbing to his hypnotic influence, the Stooges find themselves unwitting participants in a precarious spectacle atop a flagpole adorning a lofty building, wherein they engage in a whimsical dance routine.

The abrupt interruption by a passing bicyclist disrupts Svengarlic's trance, causing the Stooges to awaken abruptly, their disorientation compounded by the perilous height of their location. A fortuitous mishap ensues, propelling the Stooges through an open window and into the insurance office where Mary awaits the disbursement of her ill-gotten gains. The unexpected arrival of the Stooges precipitates a chain of events leading to the revelation of Mary's fraudulent scheme, resulting in the destruction of her check and the exposure of her duplicity.

== Cast ==
=== Credited ===
- Moe Howard as Moe
- Larry Fine as Larry
- Shemp Howard as Shemp
- Mary Ainslee as Mary
- Vernon Dent as Insurance adjuster
- Jimmy Lloyd as Cliff

=== Uncredited ===
- David Bond as Svengarlic
- Ned Glass as Svengarlic's manager
- Johnny Kascier as man on bicycle

== Production notes ==
Hokus Pokus was filmed on March 23–26, 1948, and released over 13 months later on May 5, 1949. It was remade as Flagpole Jitters (1956), using ample stock footage. It is noteworthy that these two iterations diverge notably in their denouements: while Mary's fraudulent character is foregrounded in the former, the latter portrays her as genuinely paraplegic. Conversely, the depiction of Svengarlic, the hypnotist, undergoes a paradigm shift in the remake, where he assumes the role of the fraudster.

The Stooges make a reference to Sing Sing Correctional Facility, in which Shemp believes he has hypnotized Moe into thinking he is locked up in the infamous prison. The character name 'Svengarlic' is a parody of 'Svengali,' the name of a fictional character in George du Maurier's 1894 novel Trilby.
