= A Piano in the House =

- The Twilight Zone episode
- Episode no.: Season 3 Episode 22
- Directed by: David Greene
- Written by: Earl Hamner, Jr.
- Production code: 4825
- Original air date: February 16, 1962

Guest appearances
- Barry Morse; Joan Hackett; Don Durant; Muriel Landers; Philip Coolidge; Cyril Delevanti

Episode chronology
← Previous "Kick the Can"	Next → "The Last Rites of Jeff Myrtlebank"
- The Twilight Zone (1959 TV series) (season 3)

"A Piano in the House" is episode 87 of the American television anthology series The Twilight Zone. It originally aired on February 16, 1962, on CBS.

== Opening narration ==
Mr. Fitzgerald Fortune, theater critic and cynic at large, on his way to a birthday party. If he knew what is in store for him he probably wouldn't go, because before this evening is over that cranky old piano is going to play "Those Piano Roll Blues" with some effects that could happen only in the Twilight Zone.

== Plot ==
Drama critic Fitzgerald Fortune, a caustic and cruel man, goes to Throckmorton's Curio Shop to buy his wife Esther a player piano as a 26th birthday present. The grouchy owner demonstrates the piano by placing a roll of music inside. As it plays "I'm in the Mood for Love", he begins speaking in a gentle, sentimental manner, even giving Fitzgerald a 20% discount because it is a gift. When the music stops, the owner resumes his ill-tempered sniping.

When Fitzgerald returns home, he asks Esther about the piano and says he remembered her wanting to learn how to play it. When she says it’s a player piano, he tells her that he bought it because it would save her the time and expense of taking piano lessons only to find she has no talent for the instrument. He also thinks this is a thoughtful gesture on his part.

As he demonstrates the piano by playing a roll for the song "Smiles" from The Passing Show of 1918, the Fortunes' normally solemn butler Marvin begins to grin brightly. He says that he is happy because he is well paid, enjoys his work, and likes his two employers. When Fitzgerald protests that he treats Marvin poorly, Marvin reveals he finds his ego and temper amusing, to the point where he frequently has to restrain himself from laughing aloud. Again, this change ends when the tune does.

Fitzgerald suspects that the piano makes people reveal their innermost thoughts depending on what particular song is played. He tests it further by playing a roll for Khachaturian's "Sabre Dance" on the piano for Esther. She says she hates him and believes that he married her because he wanted someone to bully rather than love. She attributes her marrying him to youthful naïveté. Satisfied with the piano's performance, Fitzgerald decides to use it on the birthday party guests.

The first guest to arrive is the playwright Gregory Walker. Gregory professes a distaste for any emotional involvement, but Fitzgerald plays a roll for "These Foolish Things (Remind Me of You)." As it plays, Gregory admits to strong feelings for Esther and even confesses that they had a tryst while she was on vacation. Esther enters and is mortified and implores Fitzgerald not to play the piano to the other guests.

The rest of the guests arrive. Marge Moore is the life of the party, enjoying the food and company while making jokes about her heavyset figure. When no one immediately volunteers for Fitzgerald's "party game," he picks Marge as the first to listen to the piano. As the piano plays Debussy's "Clair de lune", Marge goes into a trance, identifying herself as a little girl named Tina who loves to dance ballet. Fitzgerald encourages her to demonstrate, and she does so, prompting laughter from all of the party guests except Esther and Gregory. With further prompting, Marge speaks dreamily about her desire to be a tiny, "perfectly formed" snowflake, melting in the hand of a man who loves her. The guests stop laughing while Fortune continues to roar with glee. The song ends, and a humiliated Marge takes her seat.

Fitzgerald has Esther insert a new roll, which he claims will "bring out the devil" among them. He hands her a roll for the song "Melody in F," but she secretly switches rolls. The piano begins to play Brahms's Lullaby. The music makes Fitzgerald speak in a petulant, frightened voice. At the guests' prompting, he admits that, deep down, he is a frightened child who lashes out at everyone and hurts them because it's the only means of expressing himself he knows and fears they will hurt him first if he doesn't. He confesses that he humiliated Marge because he is jealous of her eagerness for life despite her insecurities and deliberately wrote bad reviews of Gregory's plays out of pure spite when he should have praised them because he's jealous of his talent.

Feeling pity for him, the guests leave without comment. Fitzgerald makes his final confession: he treated Esther with coldness and cruelty because he lacks the emotional maturity to receive and reciprocate her love. Gregory asks Esther to leave with him, and she does so, leaving Fitzgerald alone.

Fitzgerald, distraught at being abandoned, feels insulted and throws a tantrum, destroying furniture and decorations in the room. He ends his tirade by ripping the roll from the piano, ending the piano's spell on him. As he kneels on the ground, Marvin enters; remembering his earlier confession, Fitzgerald tells Marvin not to laugh at him. A somber Marvin replies, "I'm not laughing, Mr. Fortune. You're not funny anymore."

== Closing narration ==
Mr. Fitzgerald Fortune, a man who went searching for concealed persons and found himself in the Twilight Zone.

== Cast ==
- Barry Morse as Fitzgerald "Jerry" Fortune
- Joan Hackett as Esther Fortune
- Don Durant as Gregory "Greg" Walker
- Muriel Landers as Marge Moore
- Philip Coolidge as Throckmorton
- Cyril Delevanti as Marvin
