= Vivian Mason =

American actress (1918–2009)

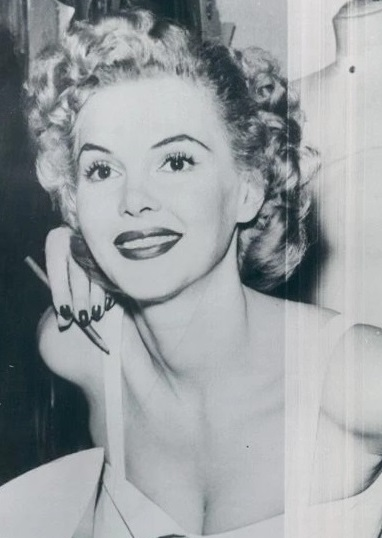
- Mason in 1953
- Born: Vivian L. Moses; July 12, 1918; Seattle, Washington, U.S.
- Died: August 24, 2009 (aged 91); Seattle, Washington, U.S.
- Years active: 1937-1955
- Spouses: Albert P. Martell (m. 19??; div. 19??); John W. Hite (m. 1986; died 1988)
- Children: 1

Vivian Mason (July 12, 1918 – August 24, 2009) was an American actress who appeared in over 30 television shows and films between 1937 and 1955.

== Career ==
Mason is familiar to modern viewers for roles in the Three Stooges films A Missed Fortune and Shot in the Frontier. In addition, she also appeared in the films White Christmas, The Fuller Brush Man, Penthouse Rhythm and The Beast from 20,000 Fathoms.

== Death ==
Mason died of inanition (a lack of food and water) and dementia on August 24, 2009, in Seattle, Washington. She was a resident of the Ida Culver House-Broadview nursing home at the time of her death, and was cremated.

== Filmography ==
Year	Title	Role	Notes
1937	Night Club Scandal	Coat Check Girl	Uncredited
1940	Flash Gordon Conquers the Universe	Ming's Gong Girl	Serial, [Chs. 1-4], Uncredited
1941	That Night in Rio	Singing Secretary	Uncredited
1941	Ziegfeld Girl	Ziegfeld Girl	Uncredited
1942	My Gal Sal	Chorus Girl - Wiley's Girlfriend	Uncredited
1942	Thunder Birds	Red Cross Nurse Trainee	Uncredited
1944	Cowboy Canteen	Ranch Guest	Uncredited
1944	Kansas City Kitty	Hat Check Girl	Uncredited
1944	Cowboy from Lonesome River	Billie	Uncredited
1944	I'm from Arkansas	Chorus Girl	Uncredited
1944	Dancing in Manhattan	Model	Uncredited
1945	Sudan	Handmaiden	Uncredited
1945	Ten Cents a Dance	Tess Kramer	
1945	Penthouse Rhythm	Model	Uncredited
1945	A Thousand and One Nights	Exotic Girl	Uncredited
1945	The Dolly Sisters	Gay 90's Glamour Girl	Uncredited
1945	George White's Scandals	Showgirl	Uncredited
1945	The Stork Club	Showgirl	Uncredited
1946	Of Human Bondage	Model	Uncredited
1948	French Leave	Lil	
1948	The Fuller Brush Man	Pretty Girl	Uncredited
1948	The Saxon Charm	Blonde	Uncredited
1950	The Petty Girl	Lovey	Uncredited
1950	Emergency Wedding	Kitty	Uncredited
1951	The Lemon Drop Kid	Singer-Dancer	Uncredited
1951	Fighting Coast Guard	Minor Role	Uncredited
1951	Kentucky Jubilee	Chorus Girl	Uncredited
1952	Harem Girl	Harem Girl	Uncredited
1952	Somebody Loves Me	Anytime	Uncredited
1953	All Ashore	Minor Role	Uncredited
1953	Siren of Bagdad	Beautiful Harem Girl	Uncredited
1953	The Lost Planet	Ella Dorn	Serial
1953	The Beast from 20,000 Fathoms	Miss Ryan - Secretary	Uncredited
1953	The Charge at Feather River	Mrs. Joan 'Mamie' Baker	
1953	Here Come the Girls	Chorus Girl	Uncredited
1954	White Christmas	Rehearsal Blonde	Uncredited
1954	Phffft	Secretary	Uncredited
