= Ned Glass =

Polish-American actor (1906-1984)

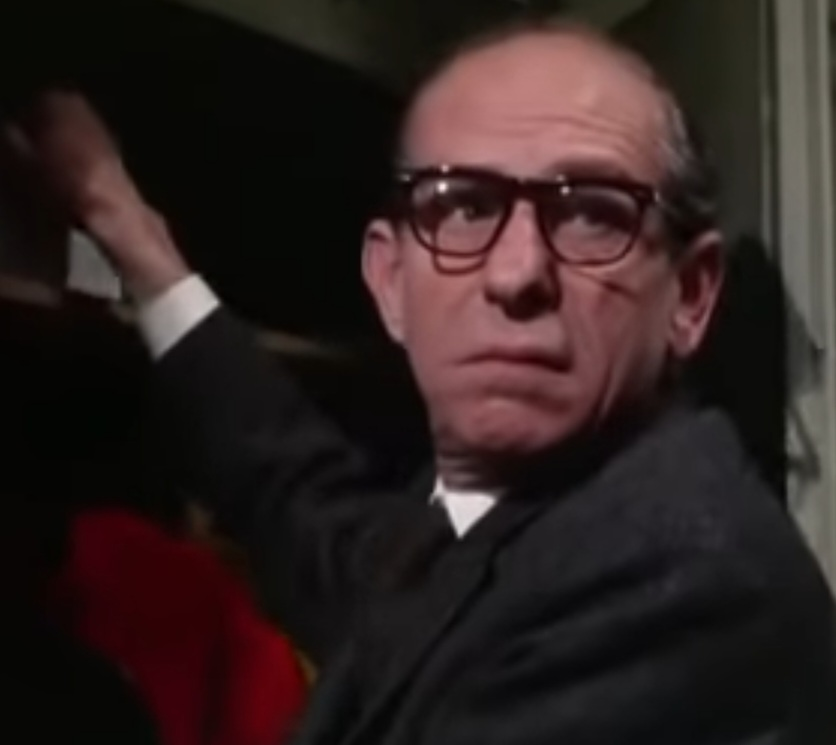
- Glass in Charade (1963)
- Born: Nusyn Glass; April 1, 1906; Radom, Congress Poland, Russian Empire
- Died: June 15, 1984 (aged 78); Encino, California, U.S.
- Occupation: Actor
- Years active: 1931–1982
- Spouses: Kitty McHugh (m. 1935; died 1954) Jean (or Jhean) Burton (m. 1965; div. 1975)

Nusyn "Ned" Glass (April 1, 1906 – June 15, 1984) was a Polish-born American character actor who appeared in more than eighty films and on television more than one hundred times, frequently playing nervous, cowardly, or deceitful characters. Notable roles he portrayed included Doc in West Side Story (1961) and Gideon in Charade (1963). Short and bald, with a slight hunch to his shoulders, he had a nasal voice and a pronounced New York City accent. He also played a stage coach driver in Season 1, episode 1 of the TV series “Bonanza.”

== Early life ==
Glass was born in Radom, Congress Poland, Russian Empire, to a Jewish family. He emigrated to the United States at an early age and grew up in New York City. He attended City College.

== Career ==
Glass worked in vaudeville, and appeared on Broadway in 1931 in the Elmer Rice play Counsellor-at-Law. He continued to act and direct on Broadway until 1936, when he was signed as a Metro-Goldwyn-Mayer contract player.

He made his first film appearance in 1937 with an uncredited role in True Confession, and his first credited film appearance came in two episodes of the serial Dick Tracy Returns (1938). Beginning in 1937, Glass worked regularly in films, helped by friends such as producer John Houseman. He was a frequent member of Columbia Pictures' short subjects department roster, and a favorite of directors Jules White and Del Lord. White prominently featured Glass in The Three Stooges' 1940 short Nutty But Nice and costarred him with Buster Keaton in the 1939 short Mooching Through Georgia. A Toluca Lake neighbor friend of Moe Howard of The Three Stooges, which inspired the myth that Moe arranged for Glass to have parts in Stooges' films; actually, Howard had little to no input into casting. Glass also appeared in other Three Stooges shorts Three Little Sew and Sews (1939), From Nurse to Worse (1940), You Nazty Spy! (1940) and I'll Never Heil Again (1941). He did not appear in any films released between 1942 and 1947, possibly because of military service, but he generally worked in a handful of films almost every year thereafter, playing small roles and bit parts, including additional Three Stooges shorts Hokus Pokus (1949), Three Hams on Rye (1950) and Flagpole Jitters (1956). He was reportedly briefly blacklisted, during which time he found work as a carpenter. Glass appeared uncredited in the 1952 film The Bad and the Beautiful as the costumer for The Doom of the Cat Men, a film within a film. He played a railroad ticket agent in Alfred Hitchcock's North by Northwest (1959). Highlights of Glass's film career include playing Doc, the drugstore owner, in West Side Story (1961), Popcorn in Blake Edwards's thriller Experiment in Terror (1962), and bad guy Leopold W. Gideon in Stanley Donen's Charade (1963). Other film appearances included the Elvis Presley film Kid Galahad (1962), Who's Got the Action? (1962), Papa's Delicate Condition (1963), Blindfold (1965), A Big Hand for the Little Lady (1966), The Fortune Cookie (1966), Blackbeard's Ghost (1968), Never a Dull Moment (1968), The Love Bug (1969), Lady Sings the Blues (1972), Save the Tiger (1973), The All-American Boy (1973), and the TV movie Goldie and the Boxer (1979). His final film appearance was in the low-budget comedy Street Music (1981).

Glass began showing up on television in 1952, when he was cast on an episode of The Red Skelton Show. He later was frequently seen on CBS in Jackie Gleason's The Honeymooners sketches. He was in an early episode of Gunsmoke, "The Photographer", as "Old Grubby", a scruffy little prospector who is brutally murdered and scalped to obtain a cheaply thrilling photograph of Western violence. Later in 1958 he played Sam Peeples, a beaten up cowboy forced to take a murder rap. All in all he was in 9 episodes, at times in a recurring role playing a townsman named "Husk". From 1955 to 1958, Glass played Sgt. Andy Pendleton on You'll Never Get Rich (better remembered as The Phil Silvers Show). In 1957, he appeared as Jackson, an arms dealer to Indians, in an episode of the syndicated western series Boots and Saddles. He appeared in the syndicated crime drama The Sheriff of Cochise and the ABC western series The Rebel, starring Nick Adams. He also appeared in David Janssen's crime drama Richard Diamond, Private Detective. Glass guest-starred in three sitcoms in the early years of television, NBC's The People's Choice, starring Jackie Cooper; CBS's Angel, with Annie Fargé; and ABC's Guestward, Ho!, starring Joanne Dru. In the fall of 1963, Glass guest-starred in an episode of the 13-week CBS combination sitcom/drama, Glynis, starring British actress Glynis Johns as a mystery writer, with Keith Andes as her attorney-husband. In 1964, he guest-starred in an episode of the sitcom The Cara Williams Show, and, in 1965 he appeared in an episode of the comedy-drama Kentucky Jones. In 1966, he played Stephens' milkman in the Bewitched episode "Oedipus Hex", and appeared in two episodes of The Fugitive, working with David Janssen once more. Glass popped up in the 1967 episode of The Monkees titled "Monkees in the Ring" as fight promoter Joey Sholto, and as convicted forger Freddie the Forger in a fifth-season episode of NBC's Get Smart titled "Do I Hear a Vaults?" (1970). He played Sol Cooper on the Diahann Carroll vehicle Julia from 1968 to 1971, and was nominated in 1969 for an Emmy Award for his performance in the "A Little Chicken Soup Never Hurt Anybody" episode. Glass also played Uncle Moe Plotnick on the short-lived series Bridget Loves Bernie (1972–1973). In 1981 he appeared on Barney Miller, as Stanley Golden, in the episode "Field Associate" and also in 1975, in the episode "You Dirty Rat", as Mr. Sam Becker, the exterminator, from Becker & Sons. His final TV appearance was as a pickpocket on Cagney & Lacey in 1982.

== Personal life ==
Glass was married to actress Kitty McHugh, sister of character actor Frank McHugh and bit player Matt McHugh. Kitty committed suicide on 3 September 1954. Glass later married actress Jean (also known as Jhean) Burton, but that marriage ended in divorce.

== Death ==
Glass died in Encino Hospital in Encino, California, on 15 June 1984 at the age of 78, after a long illness.

== Partial Filmography ==
- True Confession (1937) - Second Photographer (uncredited)
- Give Me a Sailor (1938) - Reporter (uncredited)
- Dick Tracy Returns (1938, Serial) - Kid Stark [Chs. 1, 13]
- Next Time I Marry (1938) - Reporter (uncredited)
- Woman Doctor (1939) - Undetermined Role (uncredited)
- I'm from Missouri (1939) - Teller (uncredited)
- Coast Guard (1939) - Lookout (uncredited)
- Glamour for Sale (1940) - Cop (uncredited)
- Prairie Schooners (1940) - Skinny Hutch (uncredited)
- Beyond the Sacramento (1940) - Bank Teller George (uncredited)
- The Richest Man in Town (1941) - Man (uncredited)
- King of Dodge City (1941) - Bank Teller (uncredited)
- Go West, Young Lady (1941) - Loiterer (uncredited)
- Perfect Strangers (1950) - O'Hanlon (uncredited)
- The Damned Don't Cry! (1950) - Taxi Driver (uncredited)
- The Great Jewel Robber (1950) - Prisoner in Jail Cell (uncredited)
- The Underworld Story (1950) - Editor, Atlas News Service (uncredited)
- Mystery Street (1950) - Dr. Ben Levy, McAdoo's asst. (uncredited)
- He's a Cockeyed Wonder (1950) - Sam Phillips
- Storm Warning (1951) - George Athens
- Lightning Strikes Twice (1951) - Tom - a Rancher (uncredited)
- The People Against O'Hara (1951) - Preliminary Hearing Judge (uncredited)
- Callaway Went Thataway (1951) - Mailman (uncredited)
- It's a Big Country (1951) - Newspaper Office Receptionist (uncredited)
- Just This Once (1952) - Court Clerk (uncredited)
- The Girl in White (1952) - Anatomy Professor (uncredited)
- You for Me (1952) - Harlow Douglas (uncredited)
- Stop, You're Killing Me (1952) - Sad Sam Callahan (uncredited)
- Come Back, Little Sheba (1952) - Man at AA Meeting (uncredited)
- The Bad and the Beautiful (1952) - Wardrobe Man (uncredited)
- The Clown (1953) - Danny Daylor (uncredited)
- The War of the Worlds (1953) - Well-Dressed Looter w/ a suitcase of cash (uncredited)
- I Love Melvin (1953) - Theatre Manager (uncredited)
- Trouble Along the Way (1953) - Pool-Player (uncredited)
- Julius Caesar (1953) - Cobbler (uncredited)
- The Caddy (1953) - Stage Manager (uncredited)
- Mister Scoutmaster (1953) - News Dealer (uncredited)
- Jennifer (1953) - Grocery Clerk
- Geraldine (1953) - Agent (uncredited)
- The Yellow Tomahawk (1954) - Willy
- The Steel Cage (1954) - Pete, the Guard (segment "The Hostages")
- Fright (1956) - Taxi Driver
- Four Boys and a Gun (1957) - Landlord
- Hot Rod Rumble (1957) - Auto Parts Dealer
- Back from the Dead (1957) - The Doctor
- Black Patch (1957) - Luke the Bar-Keep
- The Joker Is Wild (1957) - Johnson (uncredited)
- Hear Me Good (1957) - Funk (uncredited)
- The Defiant Ones (1958) - Doctor (uncredited)
- King Creole (1958) - Hotel Desk Clerk (uncredited)
- Colgate Theatre (1958) – Straight in S1:E6, "McCreedy's Woman"
- The Five Pennies (1959) - Murray (uncredited)
- The Rebel Set (1959) - Sidney Horner
- North by Northwest (1959) - Ticket Seller (uncredited)
- The Jayhawkers! (1959) - Storekeeper
- The Last Angry Man (1959) - Butcher (uncredited)
- Wanted Dead or Alive (1960) S2 E19 "The Monster" - Assay Clerk for gold
- West Side Story (1961) - Doc
- Experiment in Terror (1962) - Popcorn
- Kid Galahad (1962) - Max Lieberman
- Who's Got the Action? (1962) - Baldy
- Papa's Delicate Condition (1963) - Mr. Sparrow
- Charade (1963) - Leopold W. Gideon
- The Dick Van Dyke Show S3:E31 "I'd Rather Be Bald Than Have No Head at All" (1964) - Irwin
- The Patty Duke Show (1965) - Lawyer
- Blindfold (1966) - Lippy
- A Big Hand for the Little Lady (1966) - Owney Price
- The Fortune Cookie (1966) - Doc Schindler
- The Monkees (1967) – Sholto in S1:E20, "Monkees in the Ring"
- Blackbeard's Ghost (1968) - Teller
- Never a Dull Moment (1968) - Rinzy Tobreski
- Hogan's Heroes (1968, TV Series) - Max
- I Dream Of Jeannie (1969) - Mr Beamish
- The Love Bug (1969) - Toll Booth Attendant
- Lady Sings the Blues (1972) - The Agent
- Save the Tiger (1973) - Sid Fivush
- The All-American Boy (1973) - Arty Bale
- Goldie and the Boxer (1979) - Al Levinsky
- Street Music (1981) - Sam
