= Flagpole Jitters =

1956 film by Jules White

- Directed by: Jules White
- Screenplay by: Jack White
- Story by: Felix Adler
- Produced by: Jules White
- Starring: Moe Howard; Larry Fine; Shemp Howard; Barbara Bartay; Frank Sully; Beverly Thomas; Bonnie Menjum; Mary Ainslee; David Bond; Vernon Dent
- Cinematography: Irving Lippman
- Edited by: Harold White
- Distributed by: Columbia Pictures
- Release date: April 5, 1956 (U.S.)
- Running time: 15:56
- Country: United States
- Language: English

Flagpole Jitters is a 1956 short subject directed by Jules White starring American slapstick comedy team The Three Stooges (Moe Howard, Larry Fine and Shemp Howard). It is the 169th entry in the series released by Columbia Pictures starring the comedians, who released 190 shorts for the studio between 1934 and 1959.

== Plot ==
The Stooges are paperhangers concurrently assuming the role of caregivers for the disabled Mary, who uses a wheelchair. Their routine is disrupted by the allure of a poster featuring the eminent hypnotist, Svengarlic, renowned for his captivating performances. Motivated by the prospect of Mary's potential rehabilitation through hypnotic intervention, the Stooges seek Svengarlic's services, albeit unwittingly falling prey to his ulterior motives.

However, Svengarlic's intentions veer from the Stooges' altruistic aspirations, as he orchestrates a diversionary spectacle using the trio as unwitting pawns. The Stooges, mesmerized by Svengarlic's hypnotic prowess, are induced to perform a precarious dance atop a flagpole, while his henchmen perpetrate a heist at a nearby jewelry emporium. An inadvertent cyclist collides with Svengarlic, abruptly terminating the hypnotic trance and jolting the Stooges back to consciousness.

In a state of disorientation and panic, the Stooges discover themselves in a precarious suspension atop the flagpole, an unintended consequence of its collapse. This fortuitous turn of events unexpectedly propels them into the heart of an in-progress robbery, where their presence disrupts the criminal enterprise, culminating in its ultimate foiling.

== Cast ==
=== Credited ===
- Moe Howard as Moe
- Larry Fine as Larry
- Shemp Howard as Shemp
- Mary Ainslee as Mary (stock footage)
  - Connie Cezon as Mary (new footage)
- David Bond as Svengarlic
- Vernon Dent as Insurance adjuster (stock footage)

=== Uncredited ===
- Don C. Harvey as Jack the robber
- Frank Sully as Jim the robber
- Ned Glass as Svengarlic's manager (stock footage)
  - Edwin Rochelle as Svengarlic's manager (new footage)
- Richard Alexander as policeman
- Barbara Bartay as Chorus girl with ice cream
- Beverly Thomas as Mary the blonde chorus girl
- Bonnie Henjum as Chorus girl
- Johnny Kascier as man on bicycle (stock footage)

== Production notes ==
Flagpole Jitters is a remake of 1949's Hokus Pokus using ample stock footage from the original. The films have different endings: Mary is actually paraplegic here, whereas in the original she was a fraud. In Flagpole Jitters, Svengarlic is the fraud.

The Stooges make a reference to Sing Sing Correctional Facility, in which Shemp believes he has hypnotized Moe into thinking he is locked up in the infamous prison.

The character name Svengarlic is a parody of Svengali, the name of a fictional character in George du Maurier's 1894 novel Trilby.

Flagpole Jitters was the last short produced that included new footage of Shemp Howard. For Crimin' Out Loud is commonly thought to be the last film featuring new footage of Shemp. However, the new footage used in For Crimin' Out Loud was filmed on June 30, 1955: Flagpole Jitters was filmed the next day on July 1. Shemp died on November 22, 1955, before any new films were produced.

== See also ==
- List of American films of 1956
