= Blood Arrow =

1958 film

- Theatrical release poster
- Directed by: Charles Marquis Warren
- Screenplay by: Fred Freiberger
- Produced by: Robert Stabler
- Starring: Scott Brady; Paul Richards; Phyllis Coates; Don Haggerty; Diana Darrin; Jeanne Bates
- Cinematography: Fleet Southcott
- Edited by: Michael Luciano
- Music by: Raoul Kraushaar
- Production company: 20th Century Fox
- Distributed by: 20th Century Fox
- Release date: April 1, 1958
- Running time: 76 minutes
- Country: United States
- Language: English

Blood Arrow is a 1958 American Western film directed by Charles Marquis Warren and written by Fred Freiberger. The film stars Scott Brady, Paul Richards, Phyllis Coates, Don Haggerty, Diana Darrin and Jeanne Bates. The film was released on April 1, 1958, by 20th Century Fox.

== Plot ==
Bess Johnson, newly arrived in a Mormon settlement in Wyoming Territory, is having difficulty getting a shipment of smallpox vaccine delivered. In her way are Little Otter, a chief of the Blackfeet who wishes death to all whites in the territory, and Brill, a gambler who is interested in both Bess and a secret gold mine the Mormons might be hiding.

Dan Kree, a gunfighter, happens by on his way to Oregon and gives aid to Bess, who in turn saves him from a lethal snake bite. The mine turns out to be real, but Little Otter is killed and Dan gets the better of Brill. He leaves, but tells Bess he could be back.

== Cast ==
- Scott Brady as Dan Kree
- Paul Richards as Brill
- Phyllis Coates as Bess Johnson
- Don Haggerty as Gabe
- Diana Darrin as Lennie
- Jeanne Bates as Almee
- Rocky Shahan as Taslatch
- John Dierkes as Ez
- Richard Gilden as Little Otter
- Patrick O'Moore as McKenzie
- Des Slattery as Ceppi
- William McGraw as Norm
