= Scandal Incorporated =

1956 film

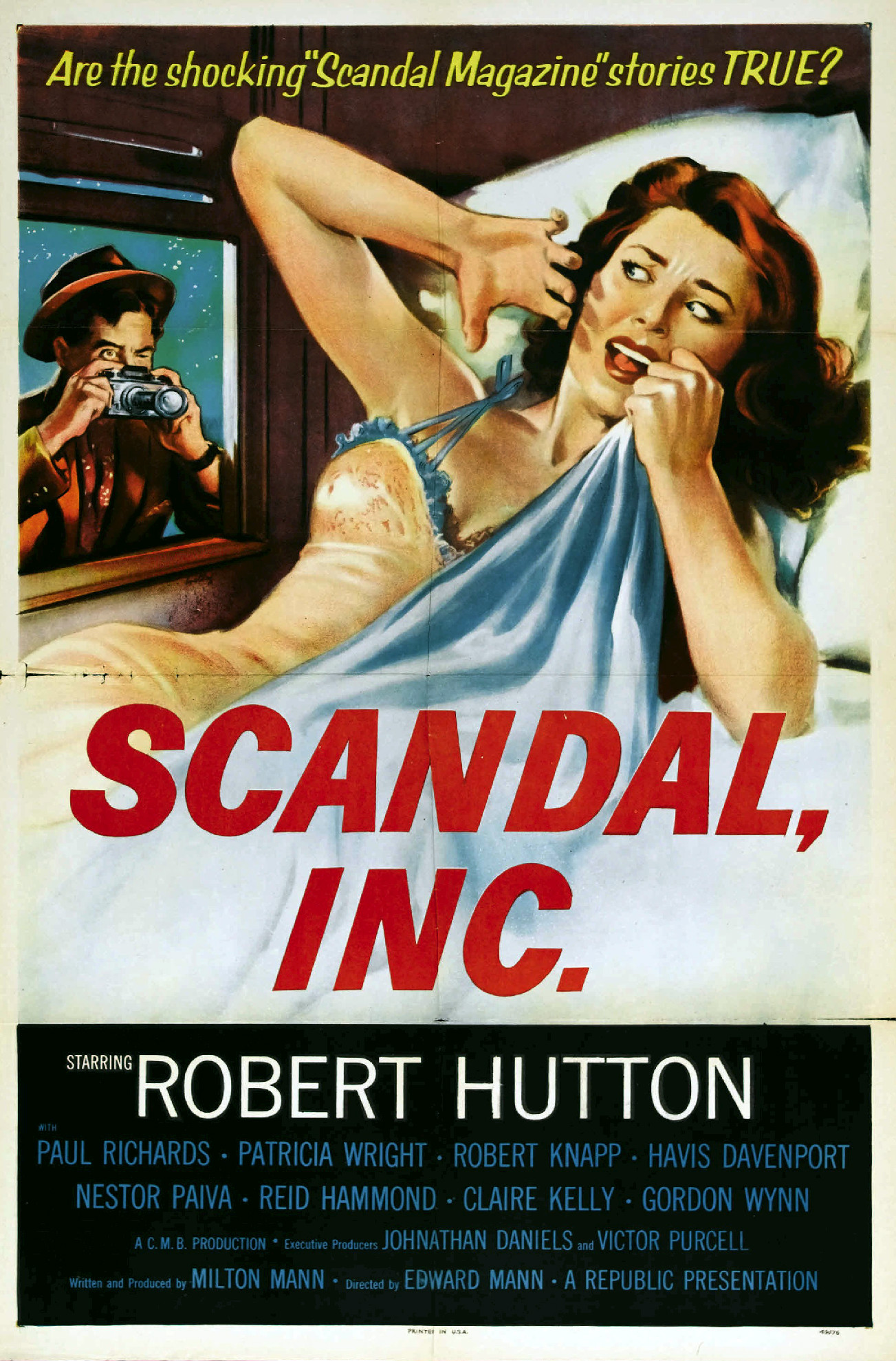
- Theatrical release poster
- Directed by: Edward Mann
- Screenplay by: Milton Mann
- Produced by: Milton Mann
- Starring: Robert Hutton; Patricia Wright; Paul Richards; Robert Knapp; Havis Davenport; Reid Hammond
- Cinematography: Brydon Baker
- Edited by: Edward Mann
- Production companies: Bonanza Film Productions; C.M.B. Productions Inc.
- Distributed by: Republic Pictures
- Release date: October 12, 1956
- Running time: 79 minutes
- Country: United States
- Language: English

Scandal Incorporated is a 1956 American film noir crime film directed by Edward Mann and written by Milton Mann. The film stars Robert Hutton, Patricia Wright, Paul Richards, Robert Knapp, Havis Davenport and Reid Hammond. It was released on October 12, 1956, by Republic Pictures.

== Cast ==
- Robert Hutton as Brad Cameron
- Patricia Wright as Marjorie Cameron
- Paul Richards as Martin Ellis
- Robert Knapp as Jess Blanchar
- Havis Davenport as Billie Wayne
- Reid Hammond as Jerry 'Dexy' Dexter
- Claire Kelly as June Trapping
- Nestor Paiva as Leland Miller
- Gordon Wynn as Herman Todd
- Donald Kirke as Sidney M. Woods
- Marjorie Stapp as Alice Yoland
- Guy Prescott as District Attorney James
- Joseph Breen as 'Champ' Winter
- Enid Baine as Martha
- George Cisar as Willie Anderson
- Allen O'Locklin as Bob Hamilton
- Mauritz Hugo as Lewis Adams
- Mimi Simpson as Marie Ryan
- Tracey Morgan as Gracie
