= Outer Space Jitters =

1957 film by Jules White

- Directed by: Jules White
- Written by: Jack White
- Produced by: Jules White
- Starring: Moe Howard; Larry Fine; Joe Besser; Philip Van Zandt; Emil Sitka; Dan Blocker; Gene Roth; Harriette Tarler; Diana Darrin; Arline Hunter; Joe Palma
- Cinematography: William Bradford
- Edited by: Harold White
- Distributed by: Columbia Pictures
- Release date: December 5, 1957 (U.S.)
- Running time: 16:17
- Country: United States
- Language: English

Outer Space Jitters is a 1957 short subject directed by Jules White starring American slapstick comedy team The Three Stooges (Moe Howard, Larry Fine and Joe Besser). It is the 182nd entry in the series released by Columbia Pictures starring the comedians, who released 190 shorts for the studio between 1934 and 1959. The supporting cast for this short features Dan Blocker as a creature from outer space.

== Plot ==
The Stooges regale their infant progeny with a narrative of their extraterrestrial exploits. In this tale, they serve as assistants to Professor Jones on an interstellar voyage to the planet Sunev (a reversal of the spelling of Venus). Upon their arrival, they are cordially received by the planet's leader, the Grand Slitz of Sunev. However, it soon becomes evident that the Grand Slitz harbors malevolent intentions to resurrect prehistoric beings and conquer Earth. Professor Jones discerns the nefarious plot but is promptly subdued and restrained.

Meanwhile, the Stooges find themselves entangled in amorous encounters with Sunevian females. During a perilous dinner encounter, the trio receives a dire warning from the alien dignitary known as The High Mucky Muck, signaling their impending demise. Determined to thwart the sinister agenda, the Stooges embark on a frantic escapade to escape the clutches of their extraterrestrial hosts. Along the way, they confront a prehistoric antagonist and ultimately succeed in liberating Professor Jones and sabotaging the equipment intended for Earth's subjugation.

Upon their return to Earth, the Stooges conclude their narrative, only to be interrupted by the unexpected arrival of a female goon, prompting a hasty retreat out the window.

== Cast ==
- Joe Besser as Joe / Joe's Son (as Joe)
- Larry Fine as Larry / Larry's Son (as Larry)
- Moe Howard as Moe / Moe's Son (as Moe)
- Emil Sitka as Professor Jones
- Gene Roth as The Grand Zilch
- Philip Van Zandt as The High Mucky Muck
- Dan Blocker as The Goon (as Don Blocker)

== Production notes ==
Outer Space Jitters was filmed on July 25–26, 1957. Outer Space Jitters features Moe and Larry's more "gentlemanly" haircuts, first suggested by Joe Besser. These had to be used sparingly, as most of the shorts with Besser were remakes of earlier films, and new footage had to be matched with old. In Outer Space Jitters, however, Larry's frizz is combed back, while Moe retained his sugarbowl bangs. This seeming inconsistency (which would occur in future films) accommodated the gag of a frightened Moe with hair standing on end.

This short marks one of the few moments where one of the Stooges breaks the fourth wall. As the professor and The Three Stooges are being introduced to the leader of Sunev, Larry says, "And don't forget to see Pal Joey, folks." This is a reference to the film of the same name that was released two months earlier.

== See also ==
- List of American films of 1957
