= Mary Ainslee =

American actress (1914–1991)

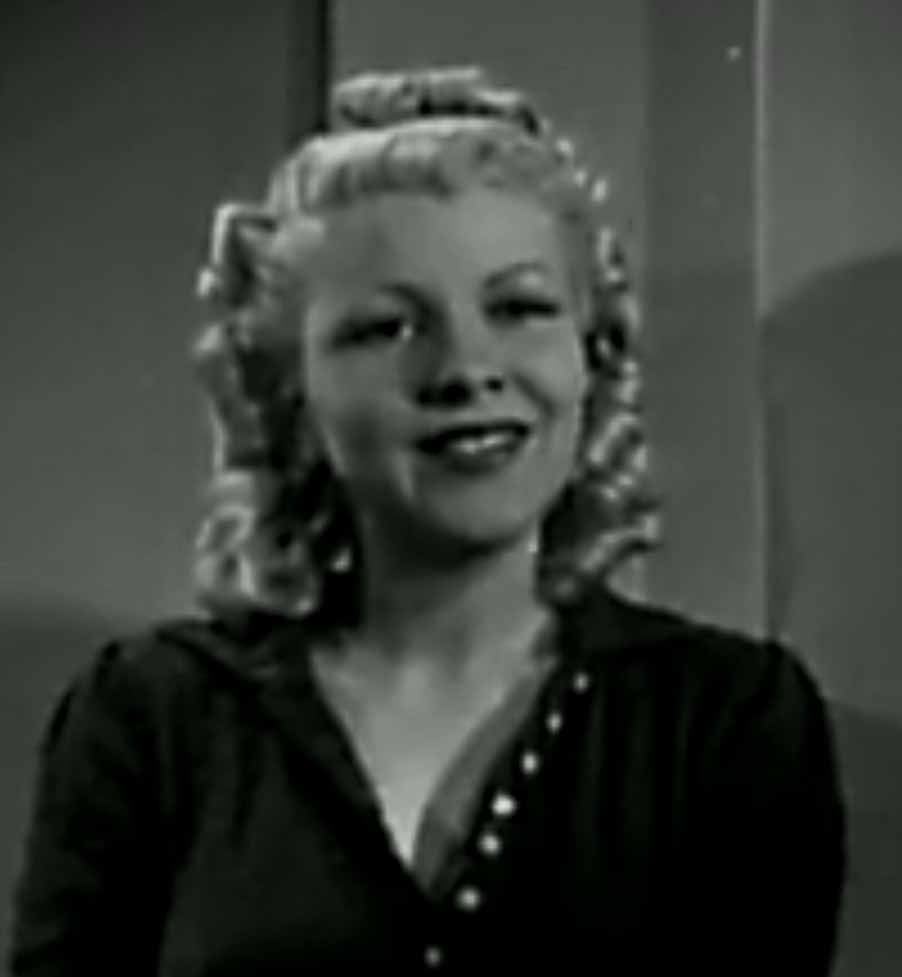
- Ainslee in Mad Youth (1939)
- Born: Florence Stiegler; October 12, 1914; Norfolk, Virginia, U.S.
- Died: November 1, 1991 (aged 77); New York City, U.S.
- Resting place: Riverside Memorial Park, Norfolk, Virginia
- Other names: Mary Ainslie; Mary Ainsley
- Occupation: Actress
- Years active: 1939–1952

Mary Ainslee (born Florence Stiegler; October 12, 1914 – November 1, 1991) was an American film actress. She appeared in approximately 15 films between 1939 and 1952.

== Early years ==
Ainslee was a native of Newport News, Virginia, and the daughter of Mrs. Clifton E. Rudd. She attended Matthew Fontaine Maury High School and Newport News High School.

== Career ==
Ainslee left Newport News in 1935 to try acting in New York. Before she began working in films, she performed in stock theater with the Provincetown Players and other groups in the eastern United States.

Ainslee's film debut was in Fight for Your Lady. She appeared in several Three Stooges films such as I'll Never Heil Again, In the Sweet Pie and Pie, Hokus Pokus, and He Cooked His Goose. Ainslee's sequences in the latter two shorts were reused in the Three Stooges' Flagpole Jitters and Triple Crossed.

== Personal life and death ==
Ainslee was married to Universal producer John DeSilva. They were divorced on May 11, 1938. She married Edwin Hutzler II in 1943 and postponed her career for the duration of the war, planning to return to acting after it ended. They lived in Tampa, Florida, and she took courses at the University of Tampa. They were divorced on June 17, 1949.

In the mid-1980s, she suffered a stroke and never fully recovered. She died on November 1, 1991. She was buried in Riverside Memorial Park in Norfolk, Virginia.

== Filmography ==
Year	Title	Role	Notes
1939	Missing Daughters	Showgirl	Uncredited
1939	Mad Youth	Marian Morgan	
1940	When the Daltons Rode	Minnie	
1940	Earl of Puddlestone	Marian Potter-Potter	
1940	Pride of the Bowery	Elaine	
1941	Sis Hopkins	Vera De Vere	
1941	The Spider Returns	Nita Van Sloan	Serial
1941	I'll Never Heil Again	Princess Gilda	Short, Uncredited
1941	Sailors on Leave	Sadie	
1941	In the Sweet Pie and Pie	Taska Jones	Short
1941	Some More of Samoa	Nurse / Curly's Blonde	Short, Uncredited
1941	Harvard, Here I Come!	Phyllis	
1941	Tillie the Toiler		
1949	Hokus Pokus	Mary	Short
1951	Pest Man Wins	Party Guest	Short, Uncredited (archive footage)
1952	He Cooked His Goose	Belle	Short, (final film role)
1956	Flagpole Jitters	Mary	Short, (archive footage)
1959	Triple Crossed	Belle	Short, (archive footage)
