= Horsing Around =

1957 film by Jules White

- Directed by: Jules White
- Written by: Felix Adler
- Produced by: Jules White
- Starring: Moe Howard; Larry Fine; Joe Besser; Emil Sitka; Harriette Tarler; Tony the Wonder Horse
- Cinematography: Ray Cory
- Edited by: William A. Lyon
- Distributed by: Columbia Pictures
- Release date: September 12, 1957 (U.S.)
- Running time: 15:27
- Country: United States
- Language: English

Horsing Around is a 1957 short subject directed by Jules White starring American slapstick comedy team The Three Stooges (Moe Howard, Larry Fine and Joe Besser). It is the 180th entry in the series released by Columbia Pictures starring the comedians, who released 190 shorts for the studio between 1934 and 1959.

== Plot ==
Joe comes across a distressing article in the local newspaper detailing the plight of Schnapps, a circus horse facing potential euthanasia due to injury. However, Moe and Larry urge Joe to redirect his attention to their sister Birdie, whose predicament they deem more pressing. Unbeknownst to them, Birdie is actually the reincarnation of a horse in pursuit of her lost mate, revealed during a breakfast revelation.

The Stooges are taken aback upon learning that Schnapps, the horse in jeopardy, is Birdie's long-lost partner. Prompted by this revelation, they embark on a frantic mission to the circus to prevent Schnapps' impending demise. En route, they pause at a cabin to recuperate, where news of Schnapps' fate is broadcast over the radio.

Upon arrival at the circus, the Stooges divide their efforts. Moe and Larry engage in a diversionary tactic, donning a horse costume to distract the caretaker responsible for Schnapps' fate, while Joe locates Schnapps and orchestrates a heartwarming reunion between the two equine companions.

== Cast ==
=== Credited ===
- Moe Howard as Moe
- Larry Fine as Larry
- Joe Besser as Joe
- Harriette Tarler as Attendant's daughter
- Tony the Wonder Horse as Birdie
- Emil Sitka as Circus attendant

=== Uncredited ===
- Ruth Godfrey White as Birdie (voice)
- Jules White as Radio announcer and man on the street (voice)
- Duke Fishman as Camper

== Production notes ==
Horsing Around is a sequel to Hoofs and Goofs. Filming was completed November 19–21, 1956.

Horsing Around features Moe and Larry's more "gentlemanly" haircuts, first suggested by Joe Besser. However, these had to be used sparingly, as most of the shorts with Besser were remakes of earlier films, and new footage had to be matched with old.

== See also ==
- List of films about horses
- List of American films of 1957
