= Patricia Wright (actress) =

American actress (born 1921)

Patricia Wright Ellis
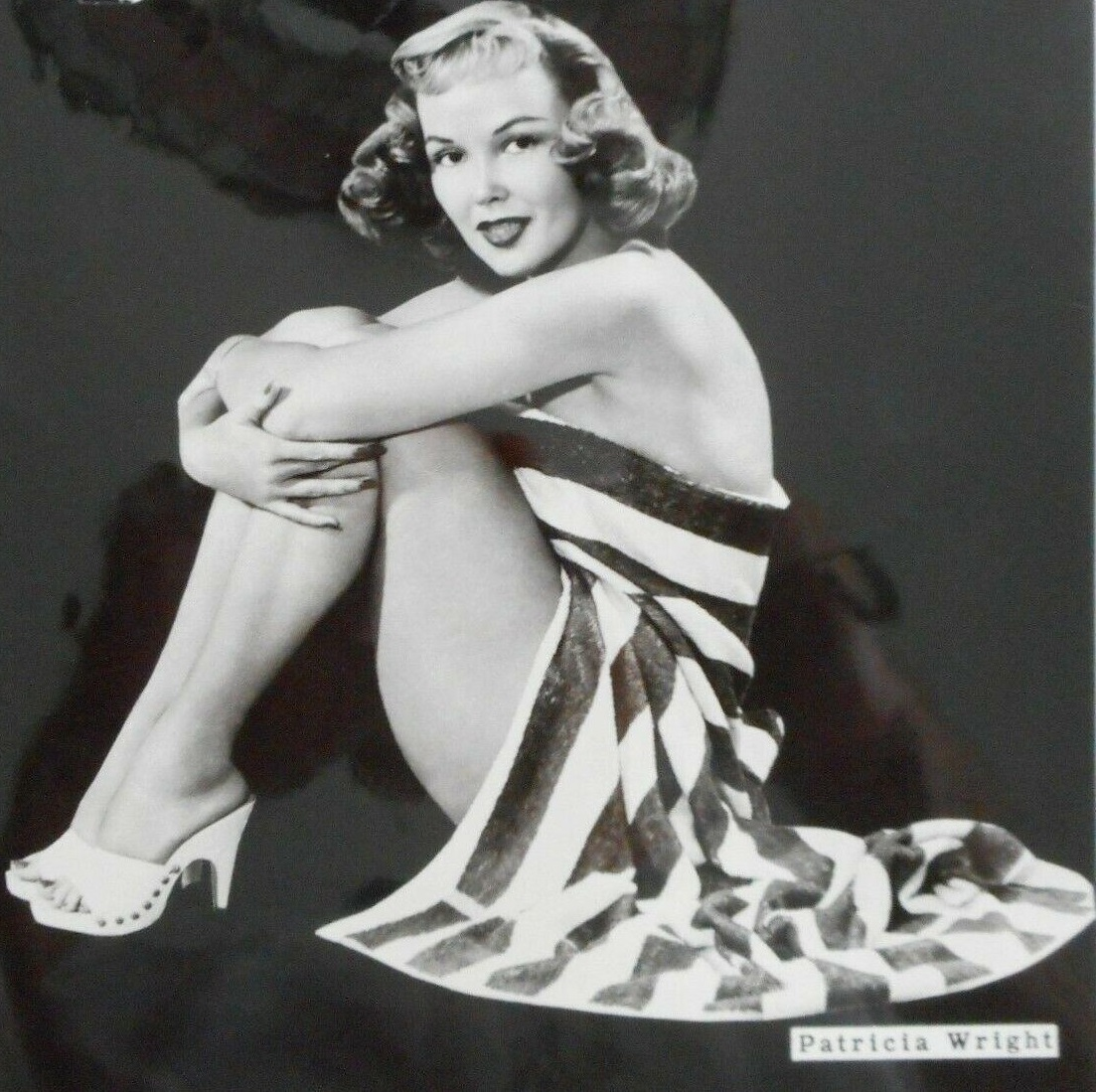
- Born: July 5, 1921 (age 105); Spokane, Washington, U.S.
- Education: Washington State University, UCLA
- Occupations: Actress; weather presenter; dancer; commercial announcer; commercial spokeswoman
- Years active: 1950–1966 (as actress)

Patricia Wright Ellis (born July 5, 1921) is an American former actress and dancer, weather presenter, announcer, and commercial spokeswoman who made several film and television appearances throughout the 1950s and 1960s. She also wrote, directed and produced, and was featured in printed adverts and educational videos for which she won awards, including at the Argentine Film Festival. Ellis was the leading lady in the short subject Cuckoo on a Choo Choo, opposite The Three Stooges. She was also an announcer on the late 1950s daytime television series Queen for a Day.

== Biography ==
=== Early life ===
Wright was born on July 5, 1921, and grew up in Washington State. She attended Washington State University, before moving to Hollywood to start an acting career in the 1940s. Wright worked as a secretary production assistant in radio, and was a production assistant on The Bob Hope Show.

=== Film and television roles ===
Wright signed with Paramount Pictures and her film appearances included Chained for Life (1952), Trail Guide (1952), and Scandal Incorporated (1956). She appeared in several American television shows, including Gomer Pyle, U.S.M.C., The Adventures of Kit Carson, and The Ray Milland Show. In addition to her film and television roles, Wright worked for Fox News, serving as Los Angeles' first ever television weathergirl. She also produced, wrote and directed educational multimedia for CBS.

== Personal life ==
Wright in her post-acting career trained at UCLA and became a college Professor in Cal State Los Angeles. After retirement, Wright was the guest of honour at the 2008 Three Stooges Fan Club Meeting. As of 2021, Wright resides in Newport Beach, California and turned 100 on July 5, 2021.

== Filmography ==
Name of Production	Year	Role
Penthouse Party (TV series)	1950	As herself
Fireside Theatre (TV series)	1950	Herself
Dick Tracy (TV series)	1950	episode: The Mosquito Murders)
Hit Parade of 1951	1950	Minor role (uncredited)
The Lemon Drop Kid	1951	Dancer (uncredited)
Racket Squad (TV series)	1951	Millie Shane
Chained for Life	1952	Renee
Trail Guide	1952	Saloon Girl
Cuckoo on a Choo Choo (film short)	1952	Lenora
Rebound (TV series)	1952	Adele Barker
Craig Kennedy, Criminologist	1952	3 roles -Lydia "Dixie" Ramsay -Alberta Seward -Mildred Kinney
The Adventures of Kit Carson (TV series)	1954	unknown
Meet Mr. McNutley (TV series)	1954	1 episode
The New Adventures of China Smith (TV series)	1954	2 roles -Kate Orleans -Maggie McGinnis
Lux Video Theatre (TV series)	1956	Phyllis
Scandal Incorporated	1956	Marjorie Cameron
Gomer Pyle, U.S.M.C. (TV series)	1966	Mrs. Gray
