= Woman Haters =

1934 musical film by Archie Gottler

- The Stooges were not known professionally as the Three Stooges when the film was released and were billed under their own names
- Directed by: Archie Gottler
- Written by: Jerome S. Gottler
- Produced by: Jules White
- Starring: Moe Howard; Larry Fine; Jerry Howard; Marjorie White; Bud Jamison; Walter Brennan; Monte Collins; A.R. Haysel; Fred Toones; Jack Norton; June Gittelson
- Cinematography: Joseph August
- Edited by: James Sweeney
- Music by: Louis Silvers
- Distributed by: Columbia Pictures
- Release date: May 5, 1934 (U.S.)
- Running time: 19:18
- Country: United States
- Language: English

Woman Haters is a 1934 musical short subject directed by Archie Gottler starring American slapstick comedy team The Three Stooges (Moe Howard, Larry Fine, and Jerry Howard). It is the inaugural entry in the series released by Columbia Pictures starring the comedians, who ultimately starred in 190 short subjects for the studio between 1934 and 1959. This was Marjorie White's last film role before her death.

== Plot ==
The Stooges, employed as traveling salesmen, join the Woman Haters Club, dedicated to eschewing romantic entanglements with women. Their resolve is swiftly tested when Jim (Larry) succumbs to the charms of Mary and proposes marriage. His comrades, Tom (Moe) and Jack (Curly), talk him out of it, citing their oath to the club.

Things escalate when Jim meets Mary's formidable father, who intimidates Jim by recounting tales of the violent punishment he and his brothers have administered to men who attempted to break engagements to Mary's sisters. Reluctantly, Jim acquiesces to the marriage.

The newlyweds begin their honeymoon with a train journey. Aboard the train, Jim rejoins Tom and Jack but conceals Mary from them and keeps his marriage a secret. Mary, upset at Jim's sudden indifference, uses her feminine allure to woo first Tom and then Jack in an attempt to make Jim jealous, thereby undermining the Stooges' fidelity to their oath. Finally, in exasperation, Mary tells Tom and Jack that Jim and she are married, and pushes her way into bed with the trio, knocking Tom and Jack out of the train window in the process.

In a denouement suggesting the passage of time, the aging Stooges reunite at the nearly deserted Woman Haters clubhouse when Jim enters and declares he wants to rejoin the club.

== Cast ==
=== Credited ===
- Moe Howard as Tom
- Larry Fine as Jim
- Jerry Howard as Jackie
- Marjorie White as Mary

=== Uncredited ===
- Bud Jamison as Woman Hater's Club chairman
- Monte Collins as Mr. Zero
- Walter Brennan as train conductor
- Jack Norton as Justice of the Peace
- Fred "Snowflake" Toones as porter
- A. R. Haysel as Mary's father
- Dorothy Vernon as Mary's mother
- June Gittelson as Mary's overweight sister
- Jack "Tiny" Sandford as Mary's policeman uncle
- George Gray as Mary's brother-in-law on crutches

== Production ==
Woman Haters was filmed over four days on March 27–30, 1934. It was the sixth entry in Columbia's "Musical Novelty" series, with all dialogue delivered in rhyme. Jazz Age-style music plays throughout the entire short, with the rhymes spoken in rhythm with the music. Being the sixth in a “Musical Novelties” short subject series, the movie appropriated its musical score from the first five films. The song “My Life, My Love, My All”, featured in this short, was originally “At Last!” from Umpa, a previous "Musical Novelty" entry. Other music cues used in other Columbia "Musical Novelty" shorts like School for Romance and Susie's Affairs.

Curly Howard was billed under his pre-Stooge name "Jerry Howard" in this short. The Stooges have different names: Curly is "Jackie", Moe is "Tom", and Larry is "Jim". This is one of the few Stooge shorts that features Larry as the lead character. Others include Three Loan Wolves and He Cooked His Goose. Thirty-nine year old Walter Brennan plays the train conductor being initiated into the Woman Haters Club by Moe and Curly.)
