= Muriel Landers =

American actress (1921–1977)

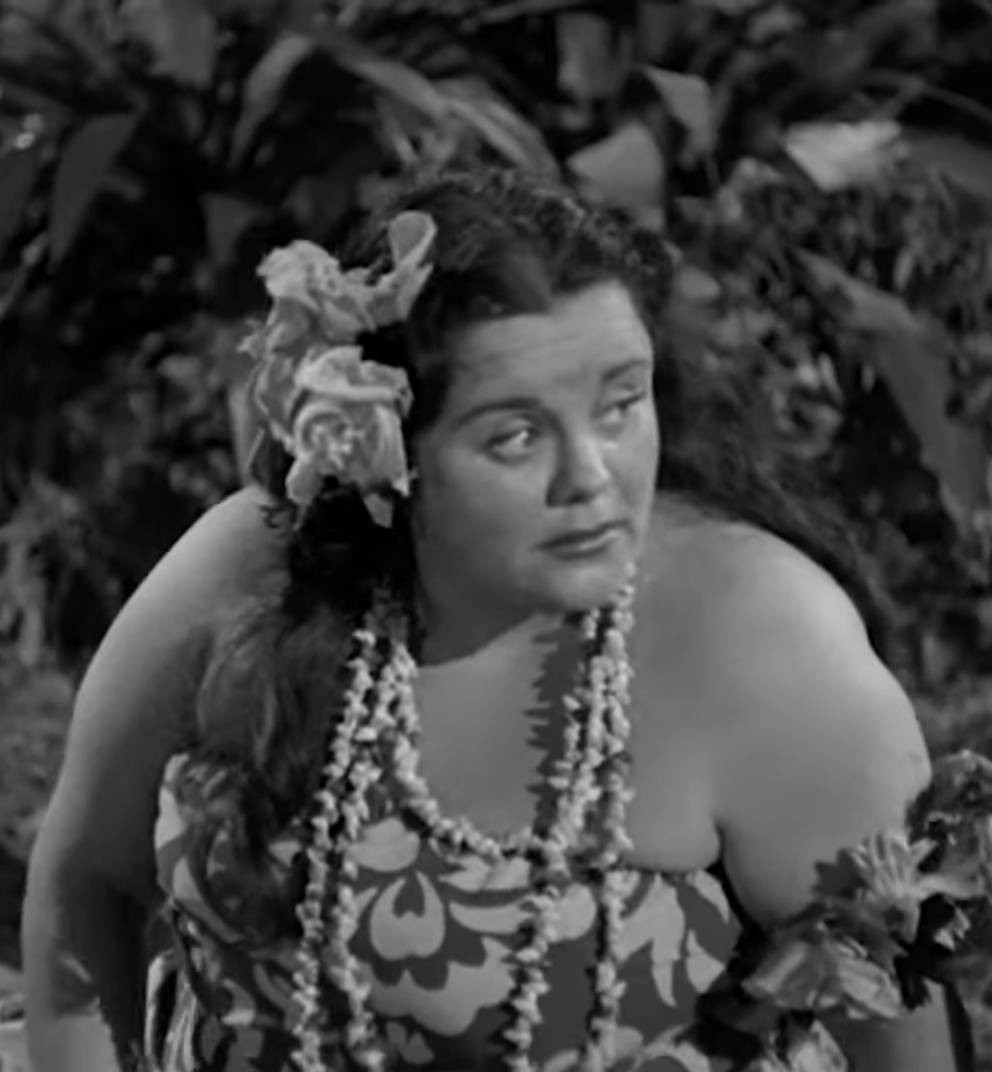
- Landers in Bela Lugosi Meets a Brooklyn Gorilla (1952)
- Born: October 27, 1921; Chicago, Illinois, U.S.
- Died: February 19, 1977 (aged 55); Woodland Hills, Los Angeles, California, U.S.
- Resting place: Forest Lawn Memorial Park, Hollywood Hills
- Other name: Muriel R. Landers
- Occupations: Actress; singer; dancer
- Years active: 1950–1971

Muriel Landers (October 27, 1921 – February 19, 1977) was an American actress, singer and dancer. She made more than thirty film and television appearances between 1950 and 1971.

== Career ==
Born in Chicago, Landers began her career as a concert singer before moving to New York City to pursue acting. She initially found it difficult to find parts because of her weight (Landers was 5 ft 2 in (1.57 m) and weighed 200 pounds), but found her niche in comedy. In 1951, Landers appeared on the variety series The Frank Sinatra Show. Her performance on the series caught the attention of Jack Benny who invited her to perform with him at the London Palladium. Landers later appeared with Benny in two episodes of The Jack Benny Program in 1956 and 1958.

She also performed on Where's Raymond?, starring Ray Bolger; The Jimmy Durante Show; The Andy Griffith Show; and Cavalcade of Stars, hosted by Jackie Gleason. In 1952, Landers made her feature film debut in the comedy Bela Lugosi Meets a Brooklyn Gorilla, starring Duke Mitchell and Sammy Petrillo. That same year, she won a regular role on the sitcom Life with Luigi. The series was canceled in 1953.

In 1957, she was signed by producer Jules White to co-star in a new series of short-subject comedies for Columbia Pictures. This was a bold move, because most studios had discontinued shorts and White was the only man still making them. The pilot film for the new "Girlie Whirls" series, Tricky Chicks, cast Muriel Landers and Bek Nelson as chubby and slender showgirls. The series was abandoned after the one film. In 1958, she appeared in the Three Stooges short Sweet and Hot. In the film, she portrayed Joe Besser's sister "Tiny", who is a singer with stage fright. She performs the song "The Heat Is On" (in footage taken from Tricky Chicks). The next year, Landers had a supporting role in the romantic comedy Pillow Talk, starring Rock Hudson and Doris Day.

Landers continued to play funny fat girls in television shows. She appeared in the May 18, 1959, season six episode of The Danny Thomas Show (starring Danny Thomas) entitled "The Practical Joke" as a chubby maid who wants to make it in show business. In 1960 and 1961, she appeared in two episodes of Pete and Gladys as Gladys' cousin Violet. She also had a recurring role as "Mildred Cosgrove" on The Joey Bishop Show. In addition to her comedic roles, Landers also guest starred on several dramas and Westerns including The Gene Autry Show, Peter Gunn, The Dick Powell Show, and The Eleventh Hour. In 1962, Landers made a memorable appearance in The Twilight Zone episode "A Piano in the House", playing Marge Moore, an overweight woman who is forced to reveal her inner sadness about feeling unloved and unwanted because of her girth. In 1963, she and actor Stanley Adams released the comedy record Marriage Is for Dinosaurs through Bigtop Records. The next year, she had a role in the comedy film The Disorderly Orderly. For the remainder of the decade, Landers continued with guest starring roles on The Beverly Hillbillies, My Three Sons, and Hogan's Heroes. In 1967, she portrayed the role of Mrs. Blossom in Doctor Dolittle. It would be her last film role.

In December 1968, she joined the cast of Rowan and Martin's Laugh-In and appeared in a few episodes. One of Landers' last roles was as Mommy Hoo Doo in an episode of the children's television series Lidsville, in 1971. Her final onscreen role was in the 1974 television film Remember When.

== Death ==
Landers suffered from hypertension and diabetes in the final years of her life. She died of a stroke on February 19, 1977, and is interred at Forest Lawn Memorial Park, Hollywood Hills.

== Filmography ==
Film
Year	Title	Role	Notes
1952	Bela Lugosi Meets a Brooklyn Gorilla	Saloma	
1952	Pony Soldier	Small Face, wife of Natayo	Uncredited
1957	Tricky Chicks	Muriel	Short film
1958	Sweet and Hot	"Tiny" Landers	Short film
1959	Pillow Talk	Marama	
1962	Moon Pilot	Fat lady	Uncredited
1963	Who's Minding the Store?	Girdle Lady	Uncredited
1964	The Disorderly Orderly	Millicent	
1967	What Am I Bid?	Concert Fan	
1967	Caprice	Fat Woman	Uncredited
1967	Doctor Dolittle	Mrs. Blossom	

Television
Year	Title	Role	Notes
1950	The Philco Television Playhouse		Episode: "The Reluctant Landlord"
1950	The Clock		Episode: "Rumble in Manhattan"
1950	Lux Video Theatre	Head Nurse	Episode: "Mine to Have"
1951	Musical Comedy Time		Episode: "Flying High"
1952	The Range Rider	Indian Mother	Episode: "Border Trouble"
1952-1953	Life with Luigi	Rosa	Unknown episodes
1954	Where's Raymond?	Millie	Episode: "The Return of Millie"
1955	My Little Margie		Episode: "The Big Telecast"
1955	Allen in Movieland	Scrubwoman	Television movie
1955	The Gene Autry Show	Little Mountain	Episode: "Go West, Young Lady"
1955	Captain Z-Ro	Mrs. Boone	Episode: "Daniel Boone"
1955-1966	The Red Skelton Show	Various roles	2 episodes
1956	The Bob Hope Show		December 28, 1956 episode
1956-1958	The Jack Benny Program	Various roles	2 episodes
1959	Peter Gunn	Clarissa Holt	Episode: "Skin Deep"
1959	The Danny Thomas Show	Muriel Schultz	Episode: "The Practical Joke"
1960-1961	Pete and Gladys	Claire; Violet	3 episodes
1961	The Dick Powell Show	Suzanne	Episode: "Three Soldiers"
1962	The Twilight Zone	Marge Moore	Episode: "A Piano in the House"
1962	The Eleventh Hour	Mrs. Cooley	Episode: "The Seventh Day of Creation"
1962-1963	The Joey Bishop Show	Mildred Cosgrove	4 episodes
1964	The Beverly Hillbillies	Essiebelle Crick	Episode: "The Girl from Home"
1964	My Three Sons	Claudia Marcus	Episode: "Caribbean Cruise"
1967	Rango	Little Sparrow	Episode: "You Can't Scalp a Bald Indian"
1968	Rowan & Martin's Laugh-In	Guest performer	Season 1 Episode 3 (Big role) Unknown episodes
1969-1970	Hogan's Heroes	Frieda & Second Nurse	Gowns by Yvette & Up In Klink's Room
1971	Lidsville	Mommy Hoo Doo	Episode: "Mommy Hoo Doo"
1974	Remember When	Shirley	Television film
