= Harriette Tarler =

American actress (1920–2001)

- Harriette Tarler in How to Marry a Millionaire (1958)
- Born: November 4, 1920; New York, New York, U.S.
- Died: November 18, 2001 (aged 81); New York, New York, U.S.
- Resting place: Mount Hebron Cemetery (New York City)
- Years active: 1956–1959

Harriette Tarler (November 4, 1920 – November 18, 2001) was an American film actress. Born in New York, New York, Tarler appeared in over 15 films between 1956 and 1959.

== Career ==
Tarler is best known for her prominent work in many late Three Stooges shorts. In particular, she made her mark in the films featuring Joe Besser as the third Stooge. She appeared in eight of the 16 shorts with Besser, and starred in all three of the science fiction comedies (Space Ship Sappy, Outer Space Jitters and Flying Saucer Daffy).

Perhaps Tarler's most memorable role was in Hoofs and Goofs, where she played the dual role of Mr. Dinklespiel's (Benny Rubin) daughter, and also provided the voice of Joe Besser's reincarnated sister Birdie. Tarler again provided Birdie's voice in the sequel Horsing Around. Other films include Commotion on the Ocean, Rumpus in the Harem, and A Merry Mix Up. After Christine McIntyre and Symona Boniface, Harriette Tarler appears in more Three Stooges shorts than any other supporting actress.

In addition to her Stooge work, Tarler also appeared in film The Joker Is Wild with Frank Sinatra, and made many appearances in the television show Dragnet.

== Personal life ==
Tarler was married to Arthur Tarler, a businessman.

== Death ==
Tarler left the Hollywood scene in the early 1960s, and returned to New York. In later years, she became an avid orchid grower. She died in New York on November 18, 2001.
