= Diana Darrin =

American actress and singer

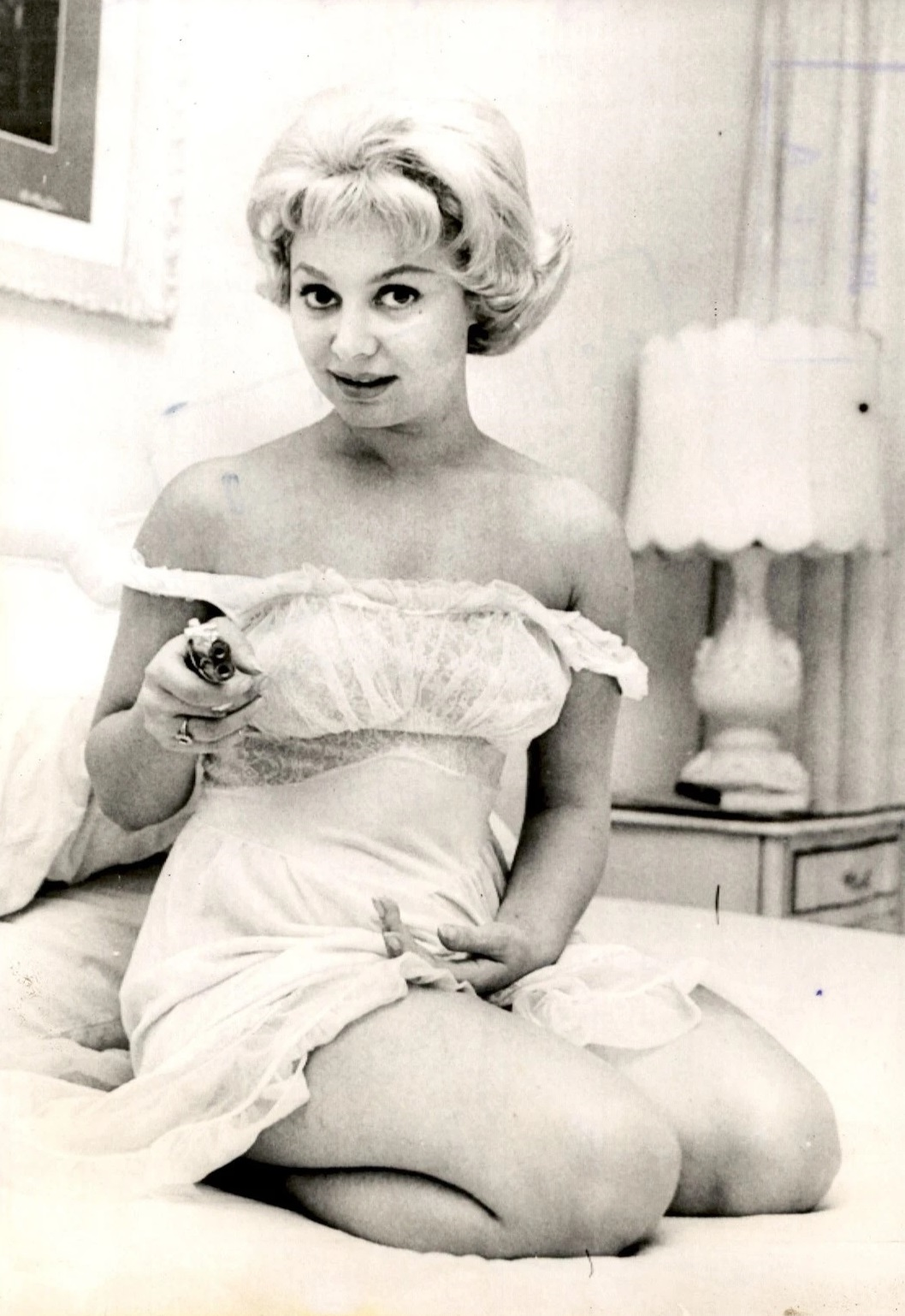
- Darrin in 1960
- Born: Harriet Bernice Tenen; 1935 or 1936 (age 89–90)
- Other name: Theila Darin
- Occupations: Actress; singer
- Years active: 1952–1973
- Spouse: Normand Richards (m. 1964; div. 1983)
- Children: 2

Diana Darrin (born Harriet Bernice Tenen; 1935 or 1936) is an American actress and singer. She has made over 35 film and television appearances in her career.

== Early years ==
Darrin is the daughter of Edward and Lillian (née Hymowitz) Tenin (who later divorced); she had a sister, Marilyn. She is a native of New Haven, Connecticut.

== Career ==
Darrin was working as a photographer in a nightclub when she was discovered. After that discovery she worked in summer stock theater in Connecticut and made films.

Darrin, initially known as Theila Darin, spent the early years of her career appearing in several later Three Stooges films such as He Cooked His Goose, Shot in the Frontier, and A Merry Mix Up.

She appeared in The Incredible Shrinking Man a 1957 film.

Later appearances include a starring role in The Broken Land with Jack Nicholson, High School Confidential, Reform School Girls, and Slither. She appeared on several television series including Bonanza and McHale's Navy.

Darrin's work as a singer included performing in nightclubs and recording on the Virgo label.

== Personal life ==
Darrin was engaged to David Marshall Williams, the inventor of the M1 carbine rifle; however, they never married.

On October 3, 1964, Darrin married Norman R. Kurtzman, a Los Angeles hairdresser.

== Selected filmography ==
- He Cooked His Goose (1952)
- Pardon My Backfire (1953)
- Paris Model (1953)
- Musty Musketeers (1954)
- Shot in the Frontier (1954)
- Rumpus in the Harem (1956)
- The Bold and the Brave (1956)
- The Cruel Tower (1956)
- A Merry Mix Up (1957)
- Outer Space Jitters (1957)
- Reform School Girl (1957)
- The Incredible Shrinking Man (1957)
- Flying Saucer Daffy (1958)
- Blood Arrow (1958)
- High School Confidential (1958)
- The Broken Land (1962)
- Slither (1973)
- The Naked Ape (1973)
- Cognitive (2025)
