= Gypped in the Penthouse =

1955 American short film by Jules White

- Directed by: Jules White
- Written by: Felix Adler
- Produced by: Jules White
- Starring: Moe Howard; Larry Fine; Shemp Howard; Jean Willes; Emil Sitka
- Cinematography: Ray Cory
- Edited by: Henry Bastista
- Distributed by: Columbia Pictures
- Release date: March 10, 1955 (U.S.)
- Running time: 16:01
- Country: United States
- Language: English

Gypped in the Penthouse is a 1955 short subject directed by Jules White starring American slapstick comedy team The Three Stooges (Moe Howard, Larry Fine and Shemp Howard). It is the 161st entry in the series released by Columbia Pictures starring the comedians, who released 190 shorts for the studio between 1934 and 1959.

== Plot ==
At the Woman Haters Club, Larry and Shemp recount their respective encounters with a gold-digging woman, realizing belatedly that they have been duped by the same individual. Jane, the woman in question, manipulates Larry into an engagement before abandoning him upon encountering Moe, who presents her with a more substantial diamond ring. Meanwhile, Shemp finds himself unwittingly ensnared in Jane's web of deception after performing a charitable act, leading to a precarious situation with her husband, Moe.

Following the exchange of their tales, the duo seeks solace in alcohol at the club. Their commiseration is interrupted by fellow member Charlie, who introduces Moe as the club's newest recruit. Both Larry and Shemp flee the club in dismay, only to coincidentally encounter Jane once more. In an act of revenge, they retaliate by sabotaging Jane's belongings and disrupting her peace, expressing their frustration at her deceitful actions.

== Cast ==
- Shemp Howard as Shemp
- Larry Fine as Larry
- Moe Howard as Moe
- Jean Willes as Jane
- Emil Sitka as Charlie
- Al Thompson as Club Guest (uncredited)
- Harold Breen as Club Waiter (uncredited)

== Production ==
Gypped in the Penthouse was filmed on July 19–21, 1954. Moe and Larry joined a club of the same name two decades previous in 1934's Woman Haters, the Stooges' first film for Columbia.

In their 24 years at Columbia Pictures, the Stooges were occasionally cast as separate characters. This always worked against the team, and author Jon Solomon concluded "when the writing divides them, they lose their comic dynamic."

== See also ==
- List of American films of 1955
