= Rockin' in the Rockies =

1945 film by Vernon Keays

- Theatrical release poster
- Directed by: Vernon Keays
- Written by: Gail Davenport; Louise Rousseau; J. Benton Cheney; John Grey
- Produced by: Colbert Clark
- Starring: Moe Howard; Larry Fine; Curly Howard; Mary Beth Hughes; Jay Kirby; Gladys Blake; Jack Clifford
- Cinematography: Glen Gano
- Edited by: Paul Borofsky
- Production company: Columbia Pictures
- Distributed by: Columbia Pictures
- Release date: April 17, 1945
- Running time: 63 minutes
- Country: United States
- Language: English

Rockin' in the Rockies is a 1945 American musical western feature film starring the Three Stooges (not to be confused with their 1940 short subject Rockin' thru the Rockies). The picture is one of the Stooges' few feature-length films made during the run of their better-known series of short subjects for Columbia Pictures, although the group had appeared in supporting roles in other features. It is the only Stooges feature-length film with the team's best known line-up (Moe Howard, Larry Fine, and Curly Howard) in starring roles.

== Plot ==
During his cousin Rusty Williams' absence at Agricultural College, prospector Shorty assumes the role of ranch foreman at Rusty's struggling spread in Reno, Nevada. Shorty, intrigued by the potential of the Wagon Wheel Cafe Casino, forms alliances with two vagrants who fortuitously win big at roulette. Joined by two stranded New York singers and their newfound wealth, the Stooges and the women embark on a journey to the ranch with aspirations of prospecting.

Upon Rusty's return, he anticipates the intervention of investor Sam Clemens to salvage the ranch's cattle and mining enterprises. However, complications arise as Shorty and the group's aspirations clash with Rusty's plans. Adding to the turmoil, incompetent ranch hands mistake Clemens for a cattle rustler. Meanwhile, Shorty, Curly, and Larry devise a scheme to secure an audition for the girls with a visiting Broadway producer, further entangling the unfolding events.

== Cast ==
- The Three Stooges as Themselves
  - Moe Howard as Shorty Williams (Ranch Foreman) (as The Three Stooges)
  - Larry Fine as Larry (a Vagrant) (as The Three Stooges)
  - Curly Howard as Curly (a Vagrant) (as The Three Stooges)
- Mary Beth Hughes as June McGuire
- The Hoosier Hotshots as Ranch Hands / Musicians
  - Ken Trietsch as Hotshot Ken (as The Hoosier Hotshots)
  - Paul Trietsch as Hotshot Hezzie (as The Hoosier Hotshots)
  - Charles Ward as Hotshot Gabe (as The Hoosier Hotshots)
  - Gil Taylor as Hotshot Gil (as The Hoosier Hotshots)
- Jay Kirby as Rusty Williams
- Cappy Barra Boys as Harmonica Musicians
- Gladys Blake as Betty Vale
- Tim Ryan as Tom Trove
- Spade Cooley as Spade Cooley (as Spade Cooley King of Western Swing)
- Forrest Taylor as Sam Clemens (uncredited)
- Vernon Dent as Stanton (uncredited)
- Snub Pollard as Drunk (uncredited)

== Production and reception ==
Rockin' in the Rockies featured musical numbers by Western Swing orchestra Spade Cooley and the Hoosier Hot Shots. The Hoosier Hotshots were comedic musicians but, unlike Spike Jones' orchestra, their country-swing music never hit mainstream playlists and they are relatively unknown today.

Oddly, Moe plays straight man as a non-Stooge character, with Larry and Curly interacting as a comedy duo. Curly is relatively subdued, as his mannerisms and reactions were starting to slow down by this time. Filmed on December 1–22, 1944, shortly after Idiots Deluxe, Curly (who noticeably played trombone in both films) was a few short weeks away from suffering a minor stroke, one that would hamper his remaining time with the Stooges. In addition, his falsetto voice sounds hoarse and strained.

As a result of Moe being cast separately from the team, Larry awkwardly assumes Moe's role as leader of the duo. As author Jon Solomon put it, though the Stooges do give the film "all the energy they can muster ... when the writing divides them into a duo and a solo, they lose their comic dynamic."

Solomon continues:

"Rockin' in the Rockies ignored many of the ingredients that were making contemporary Stooge short-films so successful. Writers Johnny Grey and J. Benton Cheney, who had barely written for the Stooges before, separated the Stooges and left Moe to act solo, including very few slapstick exchanges, and omitted an effective foil whom the Stooges could abuse or frustrate. At one point, Moe has words with and almost strangles Betty (Gladys Blake) ...

- Moe: "Jasper, [the mule] and I are alike in a lot of things."
- Betty: "Only your ears are shorter."
- Moe: "I resemble that last remark!"

... which is exactly the sort of personnel combination in which the Stooges do not succeed. Normally the Stooges either rescue a damsel in distress or are beaten up by tough, ugly, or overweight women. Here, instead of a heroic rescue or a slapstick exchange, Moe has to pull back his hands. Betty has no verbal or physical comeback, but later she gives Moe a kiss. This film may headline the Stooges, but it is not a Stooge film.

Either the writers/director (Vernon Keays) did not understand what the Stooges were all about or they consciously tried to create a new kind of vehicle for them. Characterizing Moe and Curly as wiseguy tricksters fails because the writers were unable to make them either tricky or clever liars. Often in their mid-career feature films the Stooges are called upon to 'do' their old gags and cram as many of them as possible into a few minutes, but here they simply recycle old gags without the kind of improvements Time Out for Rhythm achieved, and the dialogue is so limited that although the stag, horse and mule all talk, they actually have very little to say. Larry and Curly speak in uncharacteristically courteous dialogue as they mount the horse, and at one point the creativity is so lacking Moe calls Curly merely, 'You silly so-and-so.'

Even the sound effects are anemic or inappropriate. For the physical gags Curly's ailing health is apparent, and Moe is rarely around to cover for or interact with him. This leaves Larry as the toughie — not his best persona. Larry even has to run the 'when-I-say-go-we-all-point-to-the-right' routine. When Curly and Larry finally mount the horse, when Larry rides on top of Curly, and when Larry uses a sledgehammer on Curly's head, there is a real absence of either franticness or even the basic Stoogeness that makes them elsewhere so successful.

Ultimately, the entertainment in Rockin' in the Rockies derives from its wacky and upbeat musical acts."

Rockin' in the Rockies was not a success, and the Stooges continued their series of shorts, again with occasional supporting roles in others' feature films. The group eventually achieved some feature film success with a series of full-length pictures made during a television-fueled resurgence after Columbia had ended their series of shorts. Beginning with 1959's Have Rocket, Will Travel, these later films starred Moe, Larry, and Joe DeRita, who joined the group after the deaths of both Curly and Shemp Howard and the departure of comedian Joe Besser.
