= Jules White =

American film director and producer (1900–1985)

- Born: Julius Weiss; September 17, 1900; Budapest, Austria-Hungary
- Died: April 30, 1985 (aged 84); Van Nuys, California, U.S.
- Occupations: Film director, producer
- Years active: 1914-1962
- Children: 2
- Relatives: Jack White (brother); Sam White (brother)

Jules White (born Julius Weiss; (Note: Hungarian: Weisz Gyula) 17 September 1900 – 30 April 1985) was an American film director and producer best known for his short-subject comedies starring The Three Stooges.

== Early years ==
White began working in motion pictures in the 1910s, as a child actor, for Pathé Studios. He appears in a small role as a Confederate soldier in the landmark silent feature The Birth of a Nation (1915). By the 1920s, his brother, Jack White, had become a successful comedy producer at Educational Pictures, and Jules worked for him as a film editor. Jules became a director in 1926, specializing in comedies such as The Battling Kangaroo (1926).

In 1930, White and his boyhood friend Zion Myers moved to the Metro-Goldwyn-Mayer studio. They conceived and co-directed M-G-M's gimmicky "Dogville Comedies", which featured trained dogs in satires of recent Hollywood films (like The Dogway Melody and So Quiet on the Canine Front). White and Myers co-directed the Buster Keaton feature Sidewalks of New York (1931), and launched a series of "Goofy Movies", one-reel parodies of silent-era melodramas.

== Columbia Pictures ==
In 1933, Jules White was appointed head of Columbia Pictures' short-subject division, which became the most prolific comedy factory in Hollywood. In a time when theaters were playing more double-feature programs, fewer short comedies were being made; by the mid-1930s the three major comedy producers — Hal Roach, Educational Pictures and Universal Pictures — scaled back their operations. In contrast, by 1938 Columbia's two-reel-comedy department was busier than ever, and White split it into two units. White produced for the first unit and Hugh McCollum – former executive secretary for Columbia head Harry Cohn – for the second. The Columbia comedy stars alternated between the White and McCollum units.

With McCollum shouldering some of the administrative burden, White was free to pursue his first love: directing. He began directing the Columbia shorts in 1938 and would become the department's most prolific director. He directed his sound films as though they were silent comedies: he paced the visual action very fast, and he coached his actors to gesture broadly and react painfully, even demonstrating the movements and grimaces he wanted. This emphasis on cartoonish slapstick worked well in the right context, but could become blunt and shocking when stretched too far. White was generally under pressure to finish his productions within a few days, so very often White the producer did not tone down White the director, and the outlandishly violent gags stayed in. Still, moviegoers loved these slam-bang short comedies, and Columbia produced more than 500 of them over a quarter-century.

== Directorial style ==
Physical comedy was the main ingredient in White's short features. Some of his personal favorite gags were used repeatedly over the years. One involves a comedian being arrested who protests, "I demand a cheap lawyer!" (later "I'm gonna get myself a cheap lawyer!"). Another involves the star comedian accidentally colliding with the villain and apologizing, "Sorry, mister, there was a man chasing me... you're the man!" One of White's familiar gags involves an actor being stuck in the posterior by a sharp object and yelling, "Help, help! I'm losing my mind!"

White's style is most evident in his string of two-reelers starring comics Wally Vernon and Eddie Quillan. Vernon and Quillan were old pros whose dancing skills made them especially agile comedians. White capitalized on this by staging the kind of rough-and-tumble slapstick not seen since silent-movie days, with the stars and supporting players doing pratfalls, crossing their eyes, getting hit with messy projectiles, having barehanded fistfights and being knocked "cuckoo" in film after film. These comedies were pet projects for White; consequently, he kept making Vernon and Quillan shorts long after most of his other series had ended.

== Later films ==
By the 1950s, White was working so quickly and economically that he could film a new short comedy in a single day. His standard procedure was to borrow footage from older films and shoot a few new scenes, often using the same actors, sets, and costumes. A "new" 15-minute comedy could contain clips from as many as three vintage comedies. Though most of White's comedies of the 1950s are almost identical to his comedies of the 1940s, he still made a few films from scratch, including three 3-D comedies, Spooks! and Pardon My Backfire (1953), both starring The Three Stooges, and Down the Hatch, starring dialect comic Harry Mimmo.

== Final years and death ==
In 1956, after other studios had abandoned short-subject production, Jules White had the field to himself. However, by this time most theaters and drive-ins were using a double-feature or even triple-feature policy, leaving no room for two-reel comedies. White acknowledged the trend by winding down his activities. He made only 14 new comedies for the 1955-56 season: eight with the Three Stooges, two with Andy Clyde, two with Vernon & Quillan, and two with Joe Besser, all low-budget remakes of older comedies. White explained to historian David Bruskin, "I saw what was happening around me and realized what we were doing was repeating ourselves and, for the most part, using big chunks of previous films." White planned to shut down the entire department after the 1956 quota had been completed. Shemp Howard of the Stooges had just died and White half-heartedly fulfilled the Columbia contract by making four Stooge shorts without him; White saw little point in carrying the series any further. The Stooges and Andy Clyde had been with White since 1934, but White saw the writing on the wall. "I used to get the sales news on how the films were doing. I was watching this and so was Columbia. It was time to go to the office and say, 'Look, fellows, we've done well up to here. Why don't we leave them laughing?'" Columbia president Harry Cohn went along with most of White's plan but insisted on retaining the Stooges. Joe Besser replaced Shemp Howard as the "third Stooge".

White went on to produce 17 more shorts from late 1956 to the end of 1957. Many of his Stooge comedies now consisted of all-new material, featuring science-fiction or musical themes, and often including topical references to rock and roll and then-current feature films. White even launched a new series, "Girlie Whirls," as musical-comedy vehicles for plump comedian Muriel Landers; only one film was made before White reassigned her to one of the Stooge comedies.

Jules White finally closed his comedy shorts department on December 20, 1957. He had shot enough film for Columbia to release new shorts through June 1959, and for those theaters that still played Columbia comedies, the studio reissued dozens of older titles.

In 1959 the old Stooge comedies had just become hugely popular on television, and Columbia's New York office asked Jules White to prepare a new Three Stooges feature film for theaters. The result was Stop! Look! and Laugh!, released in 1960. White shrugged it off as a quickie patchwork: "I got a free trip to New York out of it. Stop! Look! and Laugh! took an awful lot of know-how and care to put together. I worked on the thing for over a month. We used to run four or five Stooges films in the evening at my house for I don't know how many months."

White dabbled in television at Columbia's Screen Gems subsidiary in the early 1960s, creating the 1962 situation comedy Oh! Those Bells with the Wiere Brothers, and co-producing its pilot episode with his brother Sam White, but soon retired, saying, "Who needs such a rat race?"

Almost forty percent of White's output stars The Three Stooges; the other films feature such screen favorites as Buster Keaton, Andy Clyde, Harry Langdon, Hugh Herbert, Vera Vague, Gus Schilling and Richard Lane, and El Brendel. To date, only the Stooges, Charley Chase, and Keaton series have been released to DVD in their entirety; other comedies (Andy Clyde, The Glove Slingers) have been included as bonus features on DVDs.

White died of Alzheimer's disease on April 30, 1985. His entombment was at Beth Olam Mausoleum within Hollywood Forever Cemetery.

== Filmography ==
Jules White film work
Year	Title	Role	Notes
1914	The Spoilers	Minor role	Uncredited
1915	The Birth of a Nation	Confederate soldier	Uncredited
