= Pony Soldier =

1952 film by Joseph M. Newman

- Original film poster
- Directed by: Joseph M. Newman
- Screenplay by: John C. Higgins
- Based on: The Saturday Evening Post story by Garnett Weston
- Produced by: Samuel G. Engel
- Starring: Tyrone Power; Cameron Mitchell; Thomas Gomez; Penny Edwards
- Narrated by: Tyrone Power; Michael Rennie (uncredited)
- Cinematography: Harry Jackson
- Edited by: John W. McCafferty
- Music by: Alex North; Alfred Newman (musical direction)
- Color process: Technicolor
- Production company: 20th Century Fox
- Distributed by: 20th Century Fox
- Release date: December 19, 1952
- Running time: 82 minutes
- Country: United States
- Language: English
- Box office: $1.65 million (US rentals)

Pony Soldier is a 1952 American Northern Western film set in Canada, but filmed in Sedona, Arizona. It is based on a 1951 Saturday Evening Post story "Mounted Patrol" by Garnett Weston. It was retitled MacDonald of the Canadian Mounties in Britain and The Last Arrow in France, Spain, and Italy.

== Plot ==
In 1876, the North-West Mounted Police send Constable Duncan MacDonald (Tyrone Power) and a blackmailed Blackfoot scout (Thomas Gomez) to get the Cree to sign Treaty 6 with the Crown. Initially hostile, the Cree are influenced by a Fata Morgana-type mirage that they mistake for the power of Queen Victoria.

In addition to negotiating with the Cree, MacDonald of the Mounted Police rescues White hostages (Robert Horton and Penny Edwards), arrests a murderer and adopts a Cree son (Anthony Earl Numkena).

== Cast ==
- Tyrone Power as Constable Duncan MacDonald
- Cameron Mitchell as Konah
- Thomas Gomez as Natayo Smith
- Penny Edwards as Emerald Neeley
- Robert Horton as Jess Calhoun
- Anthony Earl Numkena as Comes Running
- Adeline DeWalt Reynolds as White Moon
- Howard Petrie as Inspector Frazer
- Stuart Randall as Standing Bear

Included in the cast were Richard Boone and Frank deKova, with ending narration by Michael Rennie. Golden Globe-winning actor Earl Holliman made his film debut, in an uncredited role.

== Production ==
During development of the project, technical advisor on Native American issues, Nipo T. Strongheart, wrote a critical review of the proposed screenplay, though other departments of the studio had begun work on it. This led to a meeting with studio executives, which he described as feeling like he was called to the principal's office, and led to a major reconstruction of the whole project.

Strongheart worked with the Cree people and their language, and coached non-Indian and Indian actors throughout the movie. In the film, he plays a medicine man (as he did opposite Tyrone Power's father, Tyrone Power Sr., in a 1925 film called Braveheart). Strongheart also toured to promote the movie.

Director Joseph M. Newman originally scouted locations in Montana, but finding nothing he thought suitable, the film was made in Sedona, Arizona. There, the producers recruited 450 Navajo to play Cree when large numbers were needed. During the location shooting, production was interrupted by snowstorms and the flash of a nuclear weapon test 300 miles (482.8 km) away at the Nevada Proving Ground (Operation Tumbler–Snapper).
