= Arthur Fields =

American singer and songwriter (1888–1953)

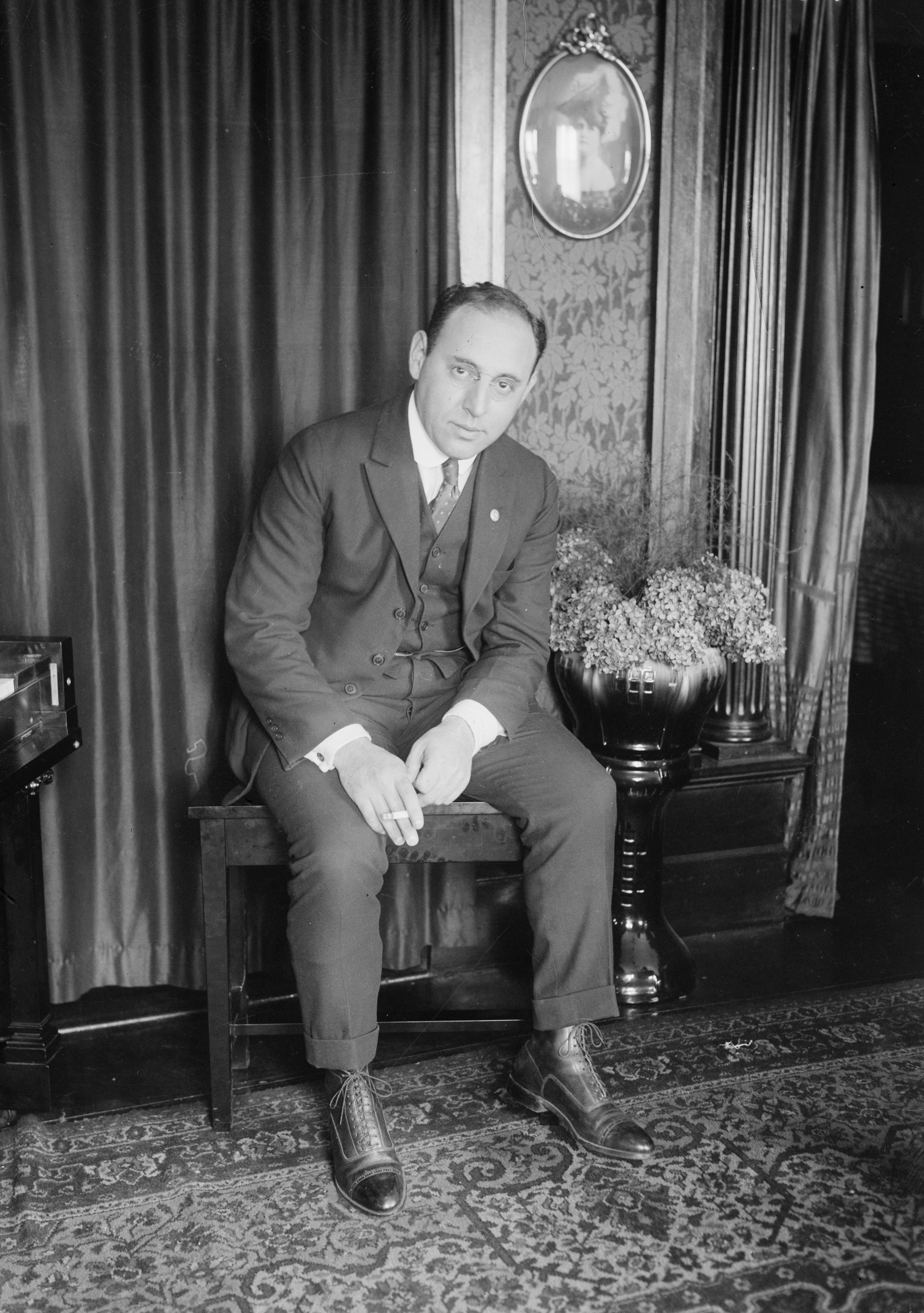
- Born: Abraham Finkelstein; August 6, 1888; Philadelphia, Pennsylvania
- Died: March 29, 1953 (aged 64); Largo, Florida

Arthur Fields (né Abraham Finkelstein; August 6, 1888—March 29, 1953) was an American baritone and songwriter.

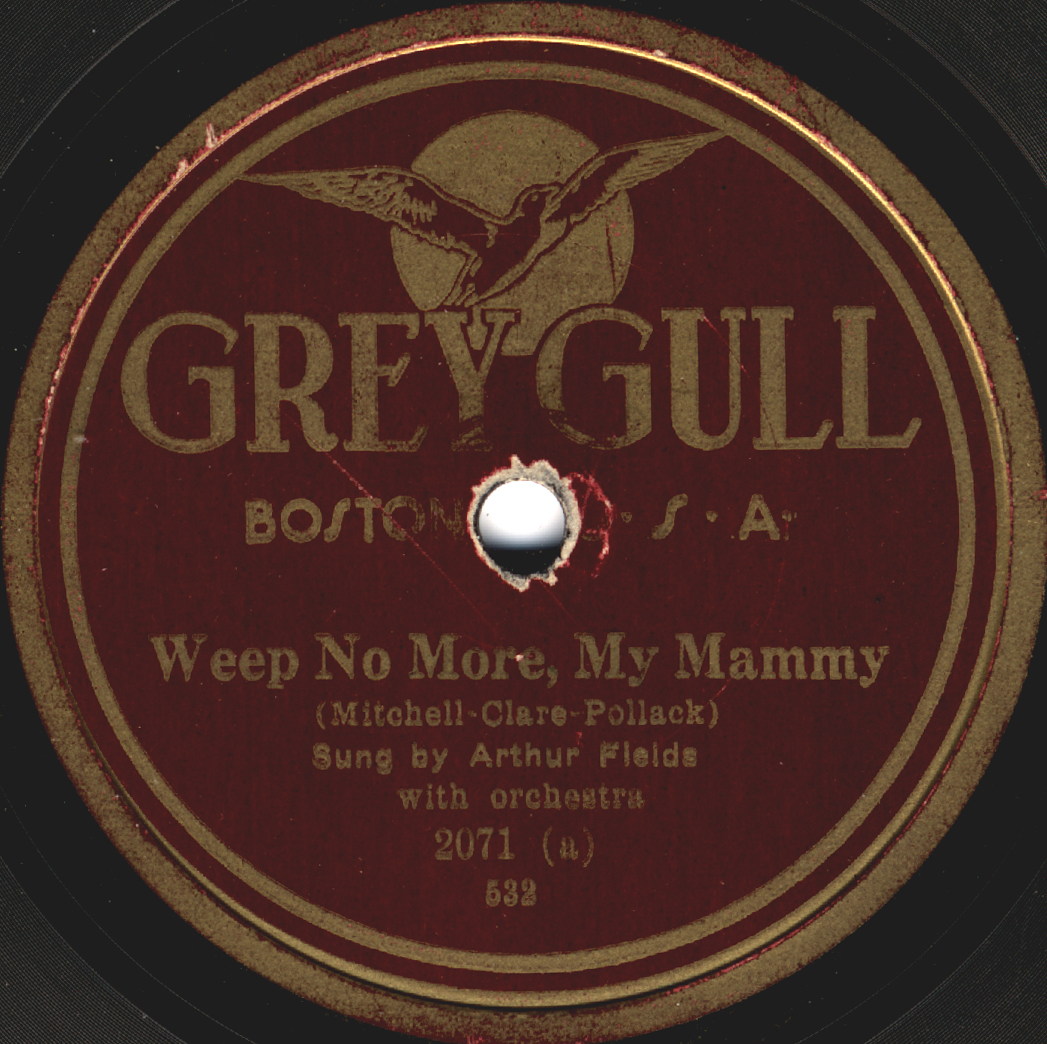
Grey Gull record from late 1921 featuring Arthur Fields singing Weep No More, My Mammy

Arthur Fields performs I fall Down An' Go Boom with his Assassinators (1929).

== Early life ==
Born in Philadelphia, Pennsylvania as Abraham Finkelstein, Fields grew up mainly in Utica, New York. He became a professional singer as a youngster.

== Career ==
Around 1908, he toured with Guy Brother's Minstrel Show, and helped form a vaudeville act "Weston, Fields and Carroll".

His first hit as a songwriter was "On the Mississippi" (1912), which he wrote the music for with Harry Carroll and Ballard MacDonald supplied the lyrics. In 1914 he wrote the lyrics to "Aba Daba Honeymoon", which was revived for the 1950 M.G.M. film Two Weeks With Love and thus got a renewed popularity which brought Fields large royalty incomes during his last two years.

From 1914 onward, Arthur Fields recorded with many bands and for many labels and had a varied career in the recording industry. In 1918, he was popular for his performance of his "Hunting the Hun" war song. His 1919 recordings with bandleader Ford Dabney may be the very first recordings of a white singer backed by a black band. For a period Fields also formed a vocal trio with brothers Jack and Irving Kaufman, billing themselves as "The Three Kaufields". Fields also often appeared on records under pseudonyms, for example as "Mr X." on Grey Gull Records and related labels. In 1926 he recorded with Oreste Migliaccio & His Queensland Orchestra. His last records were made in the early 1940s.

Among Fields' most prolific partnerships was the one with band leader and pianist Fred Hall, with whom Fields made plenty of records and co-wrote several songs, often with comic titles like "The Shoes We Have Left Are All Right", "You're My Little Rhapsody in Blue", and "I Can't Sleep in the Movies Anymore". Hall and Fields also broadcast together as Rex Cole's Mountaineers.

Retiring to Florida in 1946 he also worked in radio on WKAT Miami.

== Fields and Oberstein ==
In October 14, 1942, Eli Oberstein's Hit Records released record #7023, featuring the songs "Der Fuehrer’s Face" and "Gee, But It's Great to Meet a Friend From Your Home Town" misappropriating Arthur Fields' name. Fields, 54 years old, sued both Oberstein and the unknown artist, asking for an injunction on the sale of said records.

== Death ==
On March 11, 1953, Fields suffered a stroke and was forced to move to the Littlefield Nursing Home with his wife.

On March 29, a tragic fire at the Littlefield Nursing Home in Largo, Florida, which claimed the lives of 33 people, according to the Tampa Bay Times in an article published two days later, 33 people died, including Fields, 64 years old, who was unable to escape.

== Songs composed by Fields ==
Some of the songs listed here were composed by Fields in partnership with other composers.

- "On the Mississippi" (1912)
- "Aba Daba Honeymoon" (1914)
- "It's a Long Way to Berlin, But We'll Get There" (1917)
- "I Got A "Code" In My "Doze"" (1929)
- "The Shoes We Have Left Are All Right" (1929)
- "I Can't Sleep in the Movies Anymore" (1929)
- "You're My Little Rhapsody in Blue" (1929)

== Discography ==
- "Over There" (1917)
- "Tom, Dick and Harry and Jack (Hurry Back)"
- "Hunting the Hun" (1918)
- "Oh! How I Hate to Get Up in the Morning"
- "Ja-Da" (1918)
- "When I Send You a Picture of Berlin, You'll Know It's Over, Over There"
- "Oh! Frenchy"
- "When Yankee Doodle Learns to "Parlez Vous Français"" (1918)
- "Oui, Oui, Marie"
- "The Shoes We Have Left Are All Right"
- "Good Morning Mr. Zip Zip Zip"
- "How Ya Gonna Keep 'em Down on the Farm (After They've Seen Paree)?" (1919)
