= When the Flowers Bloom On No-Man's Land (What A Wonderful Day That Will Be) =

Song
- Language: English
- Published: 1918
- Composer(s): Archie Gottler
- Lyricist(s): Howard E. Rogers

When the Flowers Bloom On No-Man's Land (What A Wonderful Day That Will Be) is a World War I song written by Howard E. Rogers and composed by Archie Gottler. The song was first published in 1918 by Kalmar, Puck, & Abrahams Music Co., in New York, NY. The sheet music cover depicts soldiers marching with an inset photo of Fred Weber. The sheet music was later reprinted with an inset photo of Dorothy Jarrett.

The sheet music can be found at the Pritzker Military Museum & Library.
