= Nipo Strongheart =

American Indian of several careers (1891–1966)

- Nee-Ha-Pouw; Chtu-Tum-Nah
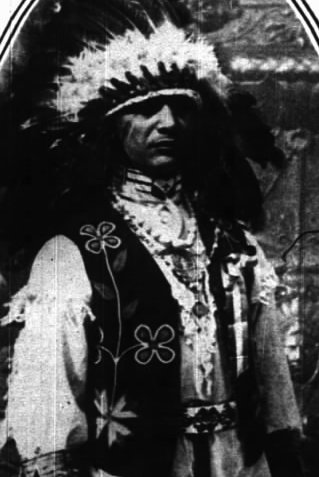
- Nipo T. Strongheart as he appeared in The New York Times in 1917
- Born: George Mitchell Jr. May 15, 1891; White Swan, Washington, U.S.
- Died: December 31, 1966 (aged 75); Motion Picture Country Hospital, Woodland Hills, Los Angeles, California, U.S.
- Resting place: Smohalla Cemetery, Toppenish, Washington, U.S.
- Known for: Native American activism, Lyceum and Chautauqua performance-lectures, and technical advisor for films with Native American themes
- Notable work: Indian Citizenship Act of 1924; Braveheart; Pony Soldier

Nipo T. Strongheart (May 15, 1891 – December 31, 1966) was an American performer in Wild West shows, technical advisor to Hollywood film producers, and lecturer on the Chautauqua circuit. Throughout his life, which spanned several careers, he was an advocate for Native American issues. He spoke on religious issues several times, and late in life he became a member of the Baháʼí Faith.

Strongheart's mother, Chi-Nach-Lut Schu-Wah-Elks, was reportedly of Native American descent; his father was European American. According to some sources, Strongheart lived with his white father for most of his childhood away from the reservation and Indian culture. Another source says he was adopted after his mother's death by a Yakama woman and brought up and educated in her family on the reservation. Although there was no written proof of his tribal membership, the tribe granted him "honorary" membership and he proudly carried around his card displaying his status. Strongheart performed with his father in Buffalo Bill's Wild West Show. His public performances began in 1917, when he was in his twenties and worked for the YMCA War Work Council. He toured military camps across New England, where he gave presentations on Native American culture and praised military service. His recruiting talks encouraged hundreds of men to volunteer for war service. After World War I and his job ended, Strongheart moved briefly to the Yakama Indian Reservation.

He soon left and had a successful career in the Lyceum and Chautauqua circuits of fairs. He gave presentations on Native American culture and often spoke against the problems of life of reservations as enforced by government policy. He played an important role in the development of the Indian Citizenship Act of 1924, which granted citizenship to all Native Americans who did not already have it; the bill was signed by President Calvin Coolidge. Strongheart believed the bill would help end reservations and empower Indian culture.

In his early youth, Strongheart had some experience with the fledgling film industry. As the audiences for the lecture circuit declined, he became involved in filmmaking. He was involved in a number of projects in silent film (especially Braveheart) and the developing talkies (Pony Soldier).

He also helped develop or found a number of organizations to support or represent Native Americans, including the Los Angeles Indian Center for urban Indians and the National Congress of American Indians (NCAI). Through Strongheart's involvement in film production, he countered stereotypes about Native Americans; he helped translate movie scripts into the languages of the Native American peoples portrayed. He also dealt with wardrobe and props.

When Strongheart died, his will included provisions for seed money and materials to enable the Yakama Nation to build a library and museum; they developed the Yakama Cultural Center. In 2014 the Yakama established a permanent exhibition about Strongheart. Scholarly interest in him arose in 1997 when researchers were studying military service by Native Americans and in 2006 when other scholars analyzed issues related to portrayal of and participation by Native Americans in the Hollywood film industry.

== Biography ==
Named George Mitchell Jr. by his European-American father, also George Mitchell, and later known as Strongheart, the boy was believed to have been born to a Native American mother named Chi-Nach-Lut Schu-Wah-Elks. She was also known as Lenora (née Williams) Mitchell. Strongheart's mother reportedly died when he was a young boy.

According to an article in the Encyclopedia of the American Indian in the Twentieth Century, after his mother's death, Strongheart was adopted or raised by one of his mother's relatives for several years, living with them and attending the reservation boarding school at Fort Simcoe. This was in keeping with Yakama tradition.

These biographies—and others—agree that Strongheart and his father were employed as bareback trick riders for Buffalo Bill's Wild West Show and Pawnee Bill traveling shows. Full families, including women and children, were employed by these shows and traveled on tour. They often set up and lived in encampments on the road similar to the traditional Indian camps. In a sense this helped them preserve their culture at a time when it was being suppressed elsewhere. One biography states that he acquired the name Nipo (short for Nee-Ha-Pouw) during a show after he fainted and regained consciousness. It was as if he had risen from the dead, and the name is interpreted as "he lives!" or the imperative "live!" He added "Nipo" to his Yakama name, Chtu-Tum-Nah, which he translated as "Strongheart". Another biography states that the name "Nipo" was given to Strongheart in his infancy by his adoptive mother.

At some point his official status as a member of the Yakama Nation ended. At a performance in 1927, he said that when his military service ended, he had been given the choice of returning to the reservation or losing his tribal rights. He did return but soon left the reservation again.

In the 1930s, when the government was encouraging tribes to reorganize their governments under the Indian Reorganization Act of 1934, Strongheart attempted to document his Yakama lineage.

Strongheart was an honorary member of the Yakama tribe during the administration of the 1946 Yakima Enrollment Act after having helped the Tomaskin family. Leonard Tomaskin would have been 22 years old in 1946. Some 22 years later, he was elected Chairman of the General Council of the Yakama Nation, their tribal government, serving from 1968 to 1983.

Strongheart wrote an article in 1954 that dates his involvement in what he called "historical ethnological studies" to around 1905, perhaps between seasons of the Buffalo Bill show. He claimed to have attended Carlisle Indian Industrial School in Pennsylvania. He also claimed to have participated in a Lubin film company production of the silent film The White Chief. Because he spoke enough English and a smattering of other Indian languages to act as a translator, he played a crucial role as a liaison between the non-Indian production staff and the Indian children they had picked for the movie.

In 1910, Strongheart was reported to be in Oklahoma, which had recently been admitted to the Union. He was serving in the 5th Cavalry Regiment during the period of the United States' Border War (1910–1919) with Mexico, when it was engulfed in its own civil war. In 1910–12, he again worked in the Buffalo Bill's Wild West Show and Pawnee Bill traveling shows as a bareback trick rider.

Later newspaper coverage reports that Strongheart was serving in the military in the West in 1914; it may have been with the 16th Infantry Regiment, which was stationed there. Strongheart was reportedly wounded and his service ended.

Strongheart said that in 1915 he advised David Belasco on the story used in the production of the silent film Heart of Wetona (1919), played the part of Nipo the Medicine Man, and appeared on stage between acts to tell the audience a portion of the true story. A May 1916 Logansport, Indiana newspaper article reported an Indian actor named Strongheart in connection with a silent movie variously named Indiana, Historic Indiana, or The Birth of Indiana, which was released in mid-1916.

In 1916, Strongheart joined the Society of American Indians, a progressive group composed mostly of Native Americans. It was organized to improve health, education, civil rights, and local government, and address the problems they faced.

=== YMCA War Work Council ===
On May 18, 1917, a person referred to as "George Strongheart" tried to volunteer for service in Roosevelt's World War I volunteers as "an expert rider, a sharpshooter and wanted to go in any capacity". Reportedly he was refused the chance to serve further because he was wounded. The attempt to form what were known as the Roosevelt Roster failed. The Sixteenth Infantry was committed to fight in World War I in France, leaving in June 1917.

For World War I, Strongheart was employed by the YMCA War Work Council, which was established in May 1917 supporting the Red Cross, Liberty Loan and Thrift Stamp projects in support of the war effort. He toured the eastern United States giving talks to support the war effort and encourage enlistment, apparently with some success. He discussed the injustice of foreigners being granted citizenship through naturalization only after a few years of residence while Indians on the reservations, whose ancestors had been on the continent for thousands of years, were not given "the same liberty and power". (This was prior to passage of the citizenship act.)

During this work, he was presented as "Chief Strongheart", with a false lineage. He went on to tour over 200 soldiers' camps. Several of the events were reported in newspapers. A part of his 1919 presentation about Indians, who he said "invented" camouflage, was picked up in several newspapers. Newspapers also reported that he returned to Yakama in February 1919. He was back in the New York area in early 1920. Around 1920, he married Inez Wiley, daughter of a Calusa nation chief, in accordance with tribal custom and law, as arranged by her father. As early as 1919 Strongheart knew of Melville Clyde Kelly and his efforts in Congress on behalf of Indians, even though Kelly had no Indian constituents or political relationships with Indians. In December 1920 Strongheart met with the Bureau of Indian Affairs commissioner, Cato Sells, but did not find a partner in advocacy for change.

=== Lyceum and Chautauqua ===
Strongheart had read The Discards by Lucullus Virgil McWhorter, which dealt with troubles among Indians in the Pacific Northwest, around January 17, 1921. He wrote to McWhorter and told him of his commitment to help the Indians and teach non-Indian audiences about their culture and their contributions to their country. Strongheart and McWhorter carried on a correspondence until the latter died in 1944.

Beginning in 1921, Strongheart embarked on an extended series of lectures-cum-performances as part of the Lyceum and Chautauqua fairs held across the United States. The Lyceum movement " ... reflected the increasing value Americans placed on public education ... [and] became a site for public discussion, debate, and controversy." Chautauqua events were called "the most American thing in America" and according to Andrew C. Rieser, were tailored to "appeal to the patriotic, churchgoing, white, native-born, mostly Protestant, northern and Midwestern middle classes". His tour included Pennsylvania, Ohio and Indiana. One of Strongheart's programs, entitled "From Peace Pipe to War Trail and Back Again", highlighted the "nobility, patience, inherent goodness, romance, traditions, faith and suffering of his people". Other programs he developed were "Tales of the First Americans", "The Past and Present of a Vanishing Race" – in which he dwelt on the effects of many decades under the Bureau of Indian Affairs, – and "My People the Yakima". Each lasted between one and two hours.

Strongheart worked for two film production companies: Famous Players Film Company and Essanay Studios. During his trip to California from March to May, he promoted petitions in favor of Indian citizenship. The tour included the state of Washington, where he visited the Yakima reservation on July 3, 1921. On one occasion, in Washington, he did not wear the Native regalia and was still well received, though most of the time his advertising said he would be wearing the Native regalia so he did. However, the ornamentation he wore was appropriate to an actual chief which he was not - being only the son of a daughter of a chief. In mid-1922 he embarked on a tour of British Columbia and Alberta, Canada. In October 1922, he mainly appeared at Society of American Indians meetings, including those in Kansas, Utah, and Illinois. A Lyceum performance was held in November in Illinois, at which he accepted an invitation on behalf of the Society of American Indians to be hosted in one year's time. During this period Strongheart's first daughter was born.

From late 1922 to early 1923, there is a break in Strongheart's activities. A story was circulated based on a comment he made in 1918 concerning rights given to foreigners rather than Indians; this was published in several newspapers. In March 1923 he was in Wisconsin, in April in New York, May in Pennsylvania North Dakota, Illinois, then California in July. Strongheart's petitions and other advocacy work helped get the Indian Citizenship Act passed in 1924. In 1924 he toured North Carolina and Texas, followed by an extended tour of California in May. A story about his Chautauqua shows was published in California, Texas, and Washington and he went to Utah, where he made an impassioned plea for better treatment of Indians. In July he went to the state of Washington and Montana. During this period his first son was born.

In 1925, Strongheart became involved in a film project by Cecil B. DeMille. Initially it was named Strongheart after a play written by DeMille's brother William C. deMille c. 1904 and produced on Broadway in 1905 as his first major success. The play had been made into a film in 1914. As the play's success continued, a remake of the film was undertaken and Strongheart was asked to serve as a technical advisor. He included elements referring to the Yakama nation and had the hero succeed in preserving Indian fishing rights, a topic of some recent interest. The original film was 30 minutes long; the revised movie ran for 71 minutes. As the project was nearing completion, a canine star named Strongheart rose to prominence. The DeMille film was renamed and released as Braveheart (1925), just as the silent film era was drawing to a close. Strongheart had a part in the film, once again as a medicine man and Rod LaRocque played the character Strongheart. News stories covering the work were published in New York and California. During this time, he encouraged a boys' group, similar to boy scouts, in Woodland, California to rename themselves after the Yakimas rather than the (eastern) Mohawks. From then on, advertising sometimes depicted Strongheart wearing Indian regalia and sometimes dressed in normal attire as shown in a scene from the movie.

In 1926, Strongheart again went on tour, giving one show in California in February, followed by a break until July, when he appeared in Missouri. He took another break until October, when he appeared in Ohio. In August that year, during that break between shows, he visited playgrounds in Los Angeles at the request of the city.

Strongheart's first marriage ended in divorce around October 1926, being effected in Los Angeles California. In January 1927 he was scheduled to perform at a Pennsylvania high school. He campaigned for amendment of the Citizenship Bill of 1924, which had not implemented the full citizenship rights for which he had campaigned. In February Strongheart appeared at an Ohio high school, and in December in Connecticut. This show resulted in an extended story covering the sufferings of Indians. He then returned to New York for the rest of the year, before going to Pennsylvania in January 1927. This coverage also prompted a broader call for changes in the treatment of Indians. In February Strongheart continued in Pennsylvania, before going to Ohio to promote the film Braveheart and to give a performance at the theatre and the local high school, which resulted in further publicity for his cause.

A performance-cum-lecture in West Virginia resulted in more publicity: "Indians are held in abject slavery says Strongheart". More performances in Ohio in April/May yielded more publicity for the suffering of Indians on reservations. In late May he attended a pow wow in the Culver City area in honor of Oglala Lakota Chief Luther Standing Bear. Then there was a break until November, when he appeared in Oregon.

After another break of several months, with several "warm up" stories that sometimes also pleaded for the suffering Indians, he made several appearances and performances in late June 1928 in Texas, which resulted in a long news story about the enfranchisement of Indians. His talks received glowing reviews, one of which said:

we have never had any attraction which gave us more satisfaction than [Strongheart]. He spoke for two and a half hours to a good house, and the attention was wonderful until the last word, and then we had what is a very unusual custom here, that is for the people to want to speak to the lecturer and compliment him on his work.

For the rest of the year, Strongheart made only a few appearances, one in Pennsylvania in July, and in Nebraska in October. 1929 continues with appearances from February to December – mostly in Pennsylvania, which also resulted in coverage of Indian advocacy and the dispelling of stereotypes. He toured in Maine, Nebraska, Missouri, and went back to Pennsylvania, where again some news stories about problems faced by Indians were published. Then he undertook an extended tour of Ohio calling for a change in the treatment of Indians. An event in Massachusetts was scheduled for November. There were further meetings in Pennsylvania and Ohio.

=== Time in Los Angeles ===
In the 1930s, during the Great Depression, the market for lectures declined. He became more active in the Greater Los Angeles Area. The national Chautauqua audiences were dwindling with the rise in popularity of radio programs and movie-going. Classical Hollywood cinema was well underway and most studios had changed to producing talkies. He gave a few performance-lectures in early 1930: one in Pennsylvania and two in Wisconsin. In July 1930, Strongheart attended a congress of Native Americans from the United States and Canada.

In October 1930, he joined the Izaak Walton League chapter in Los Angeles. He gave a talk in support of their call for protection of game animals. He recounted having served as an assistant State Humane Society officer in Washington State, where he personally saw 21 of 127 cases of elk that had been crippled or maimed by hunters. He said one of the Indians' grievances against white culture was the "wanton and ruthless destruction of animals essential to man's sustenance".

Possibly in late 1930, Strongheart married Marion Campbell Winton, whom he met in Florida among the Seminole. They divorced in 1933. In April 1931 he and his wife gave a joint performance-lecture at a church in Los Angeles. In July he took some time off to visit friends in Woodland, California, and traveled to Washington for a brief stay at Yakima. In August he tried to register for a police badge in Los Angeles, for managing employment of Indians for film production. In August 1932, on the occasion of the 1932 Summer Olympics in Los Angeles, he was employed to create an exhibition about Indians at a store. In November 1932, he gave a presentation titled "Design and Color in the Art of the American Indian" at the Central Library. In December 1932, he performed a show in Pennsylvania. In January 1933 he spoke to a Daughters of the American Revolution (DAR) meeting at the Hollywood Studio Club, followed by a series of performances in April, May and August in Eagle Rock, California, while he was in the process of divorcing Marion Campbell.

In 1933, he suffered a robbery-cum-assault in Los Angeles, which may have affected his touring. Strongheart had begun to give talks in libraries and at cultural arts events. After 1933, his public talks were few in number, with one each in 1945, 1957, 1963, and 1964. In June 1934, he chaired an Indian arts exhibition at an arts festival.

1936 was a year of transition for Strongheart. In August 1936 he hosted a pow wow associated with a community event in Hawthorne and co-founded the Los Angeles Indian Center. Strongheart gained publicity from his consulting work, and in late 1936 he was thanked for assisting Dan L. McGrath in a major biography of Chief Joseph. Around the same time in late 1936, there are reports of him operating a casting bureau for Indians in Hollywood. In 1940, McWhorter thanked Strongheart for researching records of the Nez Perce in his "acknowledgments" in "Yellow Wolf His Own Story".

==== Development of work in Hollywood films ====
Strongheart was increasingly integrated into the Hollywood studio system. In 1946 he was contracted as a talent scout to hire 100 Indians for the première of the movie Canyon Passage in Portland, Oregon. It was also attended by several Yakama chiefs after the studio representatives failed to find opportunities with Indians in 1945. In 1947, he was listed in the credits of Black Gold (Indian history and ethnology) and in the R. G. Springsteen production of Oregon Trail Scouts. Strongheart hired 50 Indians, translated the script into an Indian language, and coached the non-Indian actors on their lines. A newspaper carried his critique on Hollywood standards of beauty and roles of women in 1949. In 1950, he was involved in an MGM production of The Outriders He appeared in Young Daniel Boone as an actor and worked as a technical advisor for the film.

In 1951, Strongheart worked briefly on the production of The Painted Hills, liaising with the Miwok people. Next came Across the Wide Missouri, Strongheart translated the script, coached the stars, and worked with Lakota actors representing the nations of Blackfoot, Shoshone and Nez Perce. Also in 1951 he worked on Westward the Women, which required Ute people to be portrayed by non-Indians and Navajos. Lone Star involves a group of Coushatta people, a group with whom Strongheart had dealings during his Lyceum tour in Texas. In the 1952 movie Pony Soldier, he worked with the Cree people and their language, and toured to promote the movie. He made a number of suggestions that resulted in corrections and improvements to the script. After Pony Soldier he worked on Captain John Smith and Pocahontas (also known as Burning Arrow), Take the High Ground! (1953), and Rose Marie (1954).

==== Post-Hollywood ====
In the last years of Strongheart's career, he taught Indian arts and crafts for the University of Southern California and the University of Alaska.

==== Religion ====
At times in his performing career, Strongheart had appeared at lyceums held at several Christian church venues and Jewish temples, as well as Theosophical and Masonic lodges. He made connections between Native American beliefs in the Great Spirit and certain Christian concepts. In 1918, explaining the use of the calumet in Indian cultures, he is reported to have said:

when the Indians wished peace, the word of the Great Spirit came to the medicine man, after three appeals, to manufacture the peace pipe. The smoke from the pipe circled up and formed a cloud, attracting to the place heads of many tribes. After watching for some time, they heard the word of the Great Spirit ordering each to make a pipe, smoke, and exchange with his neighbor, as a sign of peace between them. The word came to them to be "united," as all were children of one father. In one place they were to build a temple to be known as a council lodge, as a tradition of peace for their descendants.

He also talked about the calumet, or peace pipe, in lectures in 1925 in California and in New York in 1926.

He continued to express his views of moral conduct and spiritual life. During an appearance at the Yakama reservation in 1921, he said "that the 'Great Spirit' and 'Jesus Christ' were different names for the same God, who looked upon all His children" (paraphrased by scholar Lori Lynn Muntz).

Strongheart's first known encounter with the Baháʼí Faith was February 27, 1932, at an inter-racial meeting and dinner in Los Angeles sponsored by the religion. The speakers included Chief Luther Standing Bear. In late February 1963, in a private capacity rather than as a performer, Strongheart attended a gathering of Indian Baháʼís in Arizona for a "Great Council Fire." Hand of the Cause Dhikru'llah Khadem attended, at a time when members of 34 American tribes had joined the Bahái faith and twenty six Native Americans were present. Asking attendees who had most recently joined the religion to speak up, and expressing a Baháʼí teaching on the unity of religions, Strongheart said he was making:

"an acknowledgement rather than a declaration." He recalled that his father had taken him as a young man into the towering forests of the north-west and, sitting beneath majestic trees, had related to him the universal Indian tradition of brotherhood, counseling him, "The birds sing different songs, but they fly in the same sky; the trees have different bark and bear different fruit, but all grow from Mother Earth."

He was speaking, as a new Baháʼí, of a Native American religion. Later in October Strongheart addressed a public gathering sponsored by the Baháʼís, speaking on themes of race unity and citizenship. In 1965 Strongheart, with other Baháʼís, took part in an event sponsored by the United Nations Association on the 20th anniversary of the United Nations, performing the Lord's Prayer in a Plains Indian Sign Language. In 1965 the Baháʼís held a meeting of the religion on the Yakama reservation. In 1969 the first Yakama Baháʼí community of nine adults – the number required to form a Baháʼí Spiritual Assembly – was inaugurated on the reservation.

== Death and legacy ==
Strongheart died on December 31, 1966, aged 75, at the Motion Picture Country Hospital in Woodland Hills, California and was buried with a Yakama ceremony at Smohalla Cemetery on the reservation. He had requested to be buried near Kate Williams, a relative of his mother who may have cared for him in his infancy and called a foster mother, and was buried next to the site where many of the Tomaskin family were later buried. Some brief obituaries were printed in January 1967; it was reported that some of Strongheart's legacy was to be used for a Yakima library and museum, with the rest of the estate going mostly to his son Daniel F. Strongheart. The LA Times printed a slightly longer obituary titled "Services Set Today for Chief Strongheart – Colorful Yakima Indian Was Lecturer, Actor and Adviser on Numerous Films", and Variety also published an obituary. The painter Chief Silver Moon of the Caddo nation was commissioned to paint a portrait of him.

Though his will included money and materials for the Yakama Nation, many developments were delayed. The main effort began in 1970 when three vans of building materials arrived at the Yakama nation. However, in 1972 Strongheart was still being called a "white man" by the cemetery manager. The approval to move ahead with the idea of a Cultural Center with a museum was voted on in 1973, and construction started in 1978. Development continued in 1979, and the Cultural Center, without the museum, was opened in 1980. The museum followed in 1982. These developments occurred while Strongheart's adopted kin, Leonard Tomaskin, was chairman of the General Council of the Yakama Nation. Some materials did not reach the Center until 2003.

Some of the donated materials were later stolen; the curator arrested in 2008 and most of the items were recovered. One of them, a basket understood to have been gathered by the Lewis and Clark expedition, was returned to the museum voluntarily in 2011 when it was identified. The total donation included about 7,000 reference books and a variety of other materials Strongheart had gathered during his lifetime and travels.

A 1997 work noted his military service as part of a wider review of Native American participation. Since 2005, he has been mentioned in a number of books or academic papers on Indians in Hollywood, most recently in 2013. A restoration of Braveheart from 1925 was done by the "Washington Film Preservation Project" and the film shown at a Yakama Nation Native American Film Festival in 2006 and 2007. A scholar began to give talks on Strongheart's life in 2013. A permanent exhibition based on his collections and work was established in 2014.

== Advocacy ==
=== Advocacy through talks ===
Strongheart's talks often used local references and criticized named officials, earning him the censure of the Indian Office and his employers. But these difficulties were overcome and Strongheart was able to continue, though not "naming names" as much. Overall he gathered tens of thousands of signatures in support of Indian rights in the petitions he presented at his traveling performances. Some of his trips into Pennsylvania were in support of Melville Clyde Kelly, who had a district there. The petitions and other advocacy work helped pass the Indian Citizenship Act in 1924, but he continued to campaign for the abolition of supervision by the Bureau of Indian Affairs, something largely achieved with Native American self-determination in the 1970s.

In one of Strongheart's first talks that were reported in newspapers, held on August 10, 1918, he shook hands with a Chippewa soldier and other servicemen. Later, when interviewed by the reporter, he quoted government figures indicating a broad nationalism among the Indians – that 10,000 of the roughly 100,000 Indians had volunteered for war service, and that Indians at home had subscribed to Liberty Loans for ten million dollars to support the war effort. Thousands served in the Red Cross, and by making clothing and bandages. He also said the Indians had used camouflage long before its alleged invention by the French, but others had misinterpreted it as the body painting of savages. In Rhode Island, he addressed the Newport Tower mystery, saying, "the red man has always been a believer in education and civilization". He referred to the Great Spirit guiding Indians to peace and the ceremony of the Peace Pipe and suggested that the tower was such a temple, comparing it with other Native American structures across North and South America.

An article from 1919 states, "With all the eloquence of his race ... [he] pleaded ... for the freedom of his people and advocated the right of citizenship for them ... Strongheart flayed the white race for its treatment of the red man, advocated allowing his people to leave the reservations and told with pardonable pride, of their fine war record". Possibly alluding to the Mountain Meadows Massacre, he blamed some of the history of Indian violence on Mormons who dressed as Indians and set off a chain of events leading to military conflict culminating in Custer's last stand. After that the Indians just protested being restricted to reservations, all of which was made even more troublesome when gold was found in the Black Hills.

To an audience in 1921 he "revealed many appalling facts regarding the present day treatment of Indians ... Following the lecture many people signed a petition asking Congress to give the Indians the right to vote" according to the newspaper report. His performance piece "From Peace Pipe to War Trail and Back Again" was characterized as evoking the "nobility, patience, inherent goodness, romance, traditions, faith and suffering of his people." In another instance he was reported as saying that he was "... spending his life in a work that would tend to bring about a better understanding between the white man and his people".

Another report of Strongheart's talk said he criticized white education, saying:

"[it] ... deprives the child of individuality and that too many subjects are taught and not taught thoroughly; that education is delayed too long; while the Indian child learns from earliest infancy. ... Indians were more strict in the matter of morals, the Indian boys as well as the girls being taught to keep themselves pure and to honor and protect women ... The [Indian] only killing for food while the [white man] kills for the fun of the thing. This has resulted in the loss of vast quantities of game. ... showed why the placing of the Indians on reservations had resulted in their impaired health ... canned food had proved to be detrimental to the health. ... Many injustices had been perpetrated as the shutting off of irrigation water ... The custom of sending children away from their parents to boarding schools has been fatal to the children and resulted in tragedies. ... 'sixty years ago the government granted the franchise to the colored race which is denied to the original Americans which now owing to their enforced stay on reservations have now dwindled to 196,000 Indians. The alien and colored children are in the white men's schools while the Indian children are required to be in separate schools. We believe if we are good enough to fight for you we have a right to be free. We ask for franchise and release from the reservations.

Many attendees to that talk signed two petitions (House/Senate).

In January 1922, Jane Zane Gordon sought to establish an "American Indian Arts & Crafts Foundation" and met with President Warren Harding. A story about her effort was published in The Washington Times, quoting a letter from Strongheart:

'I traveled through Reno, Nev.' writes Strongheart. 'I saw a very old lady of the Payutes seated on the sidewalk doing a little basket work to sell things. A number of passers-by stopped, watched her; some of the so-called white men remarked in a most insulting manner, and laughed at the expense of our poor beloved people ... One old, old man was there. He was hungry,' says Strongheart. 'I gave him a silver dollar, and tears rolled down his cheeks. He said "This is the first money I have seen in many years. Uncle Sam promised me grub and bed, but I sleep in the dust and I am always hungry."'

At Stratford High School (Connecticut) in 1926, Strongheart's talk began with some introductory remarks about early history and then began to:

... describe the changes that took place as the red man was driven westward and the decline of this once great race until at last they were forced to accept the dictates of the white man's government, and relinquish jurisdiction on the reservations set aside for them. ... his people were confined to the reservation for a period of 25 years. Their business and legal affairs were all to be handled by an agent responsible only to the Bureau of Indian Affairs ... at the end of the 25 year period the agents, seeing the tremendous advantage to themselves in keeping the Indians ignorant and in some cases swindled them in their business operations, brought influence to bear to have the time extended on the treaty ... 'Conditions on the reservation are no better today than they were in 1855' the speaker said. 'The education obtainable is only equivalent to a fifth-grade education. If further schooling is desired and can be paid for the young Indian is permitted to go to another school to ensure an education equivalent to that of the eight grade' ... 'More than that' he said, 'the mind of the young Indian is often poisoned against his own people by the conviction that the whites regard him as inferior. He thus loses his chance for success in both races, for he is afraid to mingle with the whites on an equal footing and he is ashamed of his own people. He becomes a renegade, an outlaw, or at best a shiftless drifter without ambition to overcome the odds against him ... [he calls for the end of educational system enforced on them and then outlines the patriotism of Indian service in WWI for the United States, he continues] This is the only country on earth for them ... and if they are willing to shed their blood for it, they should be good enough to share equally in the advantages that are given to every other race within our borders.'

In a 1927 talk to a church group Strongheart " ... made an eloquent appeal that the Indian now be given the same chance in life as the white man, in education, in freedom, and in opportunity ... He ... [had] not difficulty in expressing the most minute shades of meaning. Incidentally he had a fund of humor which caught his hearers by surprise from time to time, and occasionally he found opportunity for a little satire and sarcasm at some of the Caucasian follies."

In 1928, he more than once urged support of a bill "that would aid the 200 Alabama Coushatta people living in a swamp near Livingston, Texas. This tribe came at the request of General Sam Houston to aid in the fight for Texas Independence in 1836," which was recognized in May 1928. He also garnered several columns of space and two articles reviewing his views of Native culture and standards:

The young Indian is taught the lesson of life through the careful training of his parents, the mother devoting her entire time to her children and the father teaching his son to hunt and fish, taking him with him as a companion. They are taught self reliance at an early age, and they are taught to respect women above all things, and protect them ever against himself. The children of the Indian family bear the name of the mother, rather than the father, which is explained in that they are born of the mother's flesh and blood and not the father's. From time to time they receive a different name, and their names signify their outstanding characteristics or accomplishments.

Before an Indian is permitted to consider marriage with a young girl he must have attained three feathers, each with a meaning, one for patience, courage and bravery, and two additional ones for honor must be added before he may be married. In this way the Indian protects his women from marrying unworthy men and there is no cause for divorce in his government ... (of the Indian Citizen Bill that passed he says it) failed to accomplish its purpose ... but which resulted in the Congress of the United States passing a resolution to investigate the entire system of the Indian office and its agencies. It is the hope that the Senate investigation committee will during this summer visit the isolated settlement of the Alabama and Coushata Indians, who are now living in a most pitiful state of existence, and observe the suffering these people have to ensure that no white man would ever tolerate under any circumstances ...

He points out that ... an education above the fifth grade must have the sanction of the government agent of the reservation ... the younger ones, who have had schooling, should be enable to learn by responsibility. They might make some mistakes, but they would learn by them, and make better citizens than they have under 95 years of paternalism ... the Bureau of Indian Affairs still claims that the Indians are incompetent; does this not speak very poorly of the paternalism of that monstrous organization ... ?

=== Advocacy through Hollywood ===
Strongheart practised his activism broadly across his career, addressing stereotypes about indigenous peoples of North America and racism in early American film. According to Michelle H. Raheja, "Strongheart played primarily uncredited minor roles in films; however, his work off-screen is critical to understanding how Native American actors operated within a visual sovereignty paradigm. ... Strongheart ... used his position as an actor to propel his activism. He hosted Native American students from Sherman Institute ...". Scholar Joanna Hearne wrote, "Throughout his career in Hollywood, he worked as a translator, language coach, and casting agent for Westerns when directors sought to include realistic elements in their films ... in some cases he was able to use this position to agitate for changes, even suggesting the additions of specific characters".

The first specific case mentioned by scholars was his involvement in the 1925 remake of Braveheart, where he was able to include Indians who were not dressed in regalia and succeeded in redressing wrongs done to them; the lead role, however, was still played by a white man in Indian costume. Hearne said of the film, "The court sequence is heavily and multiply textualized ... conveying legal arguments and judgements that refer to treaties ... the judge's decision parses the meaning of the treaty text itself: 'We have examined the Federal treaty with the Indians and find that it gives them the right to fish where and when they please, without limitation by State tax or private ownership.'" A second specific case came late in Strongheart's career, on Pony Soldier, for which he wrote a critical review of the proposed screenplay, even though other departments of the studio had begun work on it. This led to a meeting with studio executives, resulting in major changes to the project.

=== Advocacy through associations ===
Visiting reservations gave Strongheart a chance to learn from different nations and let him report to the Society of American Indians on the conditions in reservations, which he was doing actively by 1921. Through the Society he reported on investigations of land grabs against Paiutes and advocated for the unrecognized tribes of the Calusa and Pitt River peoples.

Early in his transition to working in Los Angeles, Strongheart co-founded the Los Angeles Indian Center in 1936. Joan Weibel-Orlando, quoting Bramstedt (1977:93) said, "the Los Angeles Indian Center was "the most widely known Indian institution in Los Angeles and 'played an integral role in the formation of service organizations. In fact, if the history of [Los Angeles] Indian groups had any common thread, it was produced by this organization'"

Still early in his transition to Hollywood Strongheart also aided directly in the founding of the National Congress of American Indians in 1944, in response to termination and assimilation policies that the U.S. government forced upon the tribal governments in contravention of their treaty rights and status as sovereign entities. The organization continues to be an association of federally recognized and state recognized American Indian tribes.

== See also ==
- Indian Citizenship Act
- Baháʼí Faith and Native Americans
- Phil Lucas, a leading Native American associated with Hollywood, and a Baháʼí.
- Kevin Locke, another cultural performer, and a Baháʼí.
