= Jane Powell =

American actress (1929–2021)

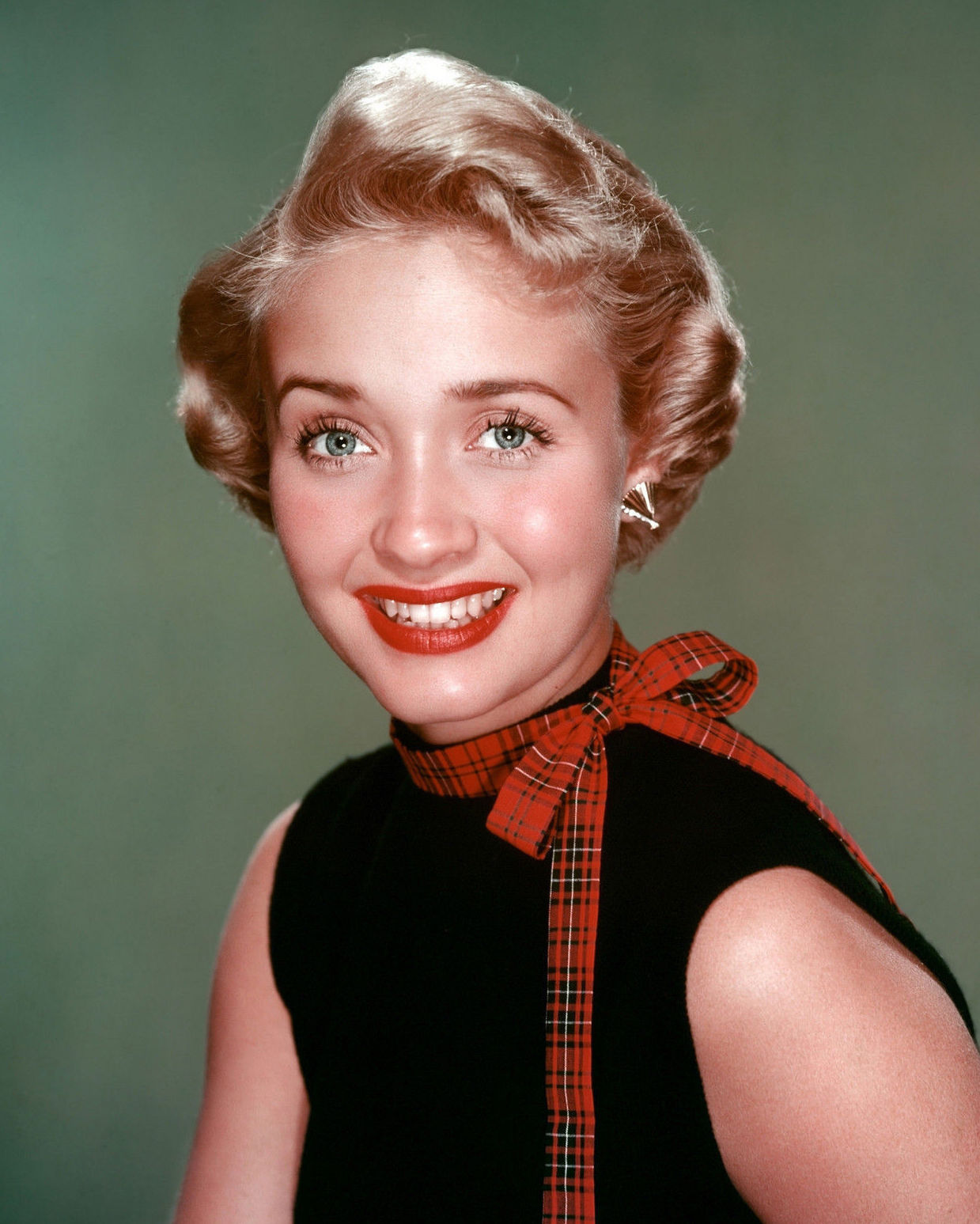
- Powell in 1952
- Born: Suzanne Lorraine Burce; April 1, 1929; Portland, Oregon, U.S.
- Died: September 16, 2021 (aged 92); Wilton, Connecticut, U.S.
- Occupations: Actress; singer; dancer
- Years active: 1941–2007
- Known for: Seven Brides for Seven Brothers; A Date with Judy; Royal Wedding; Hit the Deck
- Spouses: Geary Steffen (m. 1949; div. 1953) Patrick Nerney (m. 1954; div. 1963) James Fitzgerald (m. 1965; div. 1975) David Parlour (m. 1978; div. 1981) Dickie Moore (m. 1988; died 2015)
- Children: 3

Jane Powell (born Suzanne Lorraine Burce; April 1, 1929 – September 16, 2021) was an American actress, singer, and dancer who appeared in Metro-Goldwyn-Mayer musicals in the 1940s and 50s. With her soprano voice and girl-next-door image, Powell appeared in films, television and on the stage, performing in the musicals A Date with Judy (1948), Royal Wedding (1951), Seven Brides for Seven Brothers (1954), and Hit the Deck (1955).

In the 1950s Powell starred in the film noir The Female Animal (1958) and adventure film Enchanted Island (1958). She made appearances on stage in My Fair Lady and The Sound of Music, and television appearances in guest roles on The Love Boat (1981–1982) and the sitcom Growing Pains (1988–1992). She was a veteran of the Golden Age of Hollywood.

Powell starred in off-Broadway productions of Avow and Bounce in 2000.

In December 2007, Powell united with the musical group Pink Martini, performing as a vocalist with them in their shared hometown of Portland. She appeared in local theatre productions in Wilton, Connecticut before her death.

== Early years ==
Powell was born Suzanne Lorraine Burce, the only child of Paul Emerson Burce and Eileen Baker Burce, on April 1, 1929, in Portland, Oregon. Powell began dance lessons when she was 2 years old. By age 5, Powell had appeared on the Portland children's radio program Stars of Tomorrow. She took dance lessons at the Agnes Peters School of Dance, where the Burce family met a talent scout and dance instructor who persuaded the family to move to Oakland, California, to attract Hollywood talent agents. After three months of living in a hotel room, the family returned to Portland, and her father took a job managing a Banbury Cross apartment building. While living in Banbury Cross, Powell took singing lessons.

When Powell was 12 years old, a talent promoter helped her get selected as the Oregon Victory Girl. She began singing on Portland radio station KOIN and traveled Oregon for two years, singing and selling victory bonds. While vacationing in California in 1943, Powell won a Hollywood talent show and signed a contract with MGM Theaters in Hollywood the next day at the age of 14.

She wanted to go back to high school and to university, but her mother forbade this because she was the only one in the family making good money.

== Career ==
=== 1943–1950 ===
After signing with MGM, Powell was lent to United Artists for her first film, Song of the Open Road (1944), where she played the character of Jane Powell and took that as her professional name. In 1945, Powell sang "Because" at the wedding of Esther Williams and Ben Gage.

Powell's second feature film was Delightfully Dangerous (1945), then she appeared in Holiday in Mexico (1946), where she met Roddy McDowall, who became a life-long friend.

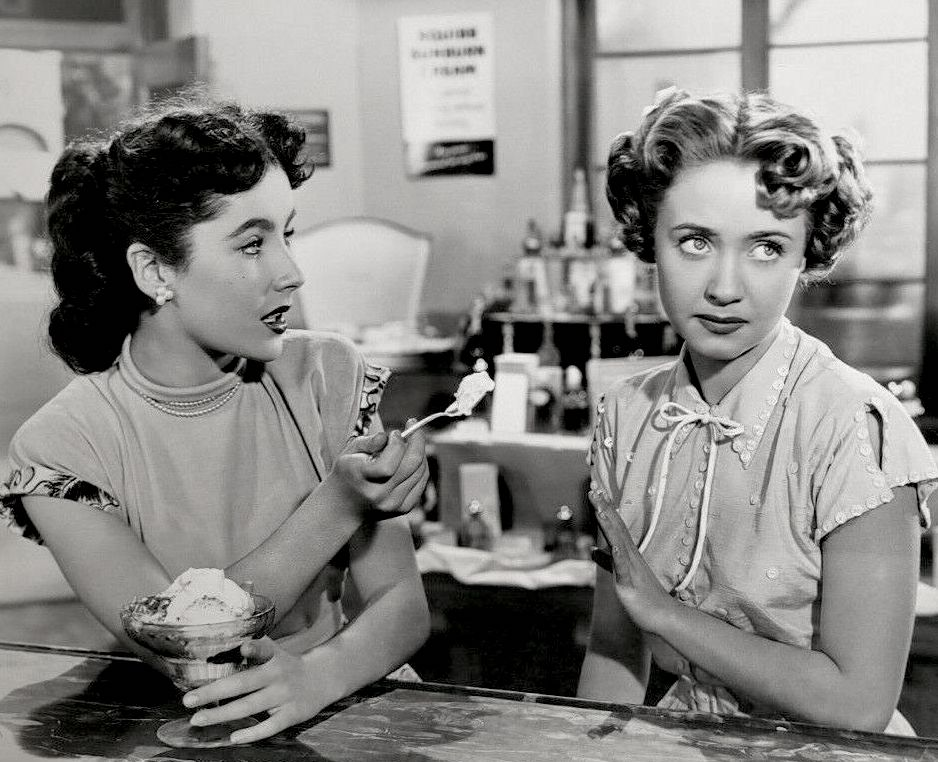
Powell with Elizabeth Taylor in A Date with Judy (1948)

More films followed, including Three Daring Daughters (1948), A Date with Judy (1948), Luxury Liner (1948), Nancy Goes to Rio (1950), and Two Weeks with Love (1950).

Powell lamented that, at the age of 25 and with children of her own, she found herself typecast in teenage roles, but she accepted the roles because she needed to support her family.

In 1949, Powell sang at Harry S. Truman’s inaugural ball, and she sang for five U.S. presidents and the queen of England.

=== 1951–1958 ===
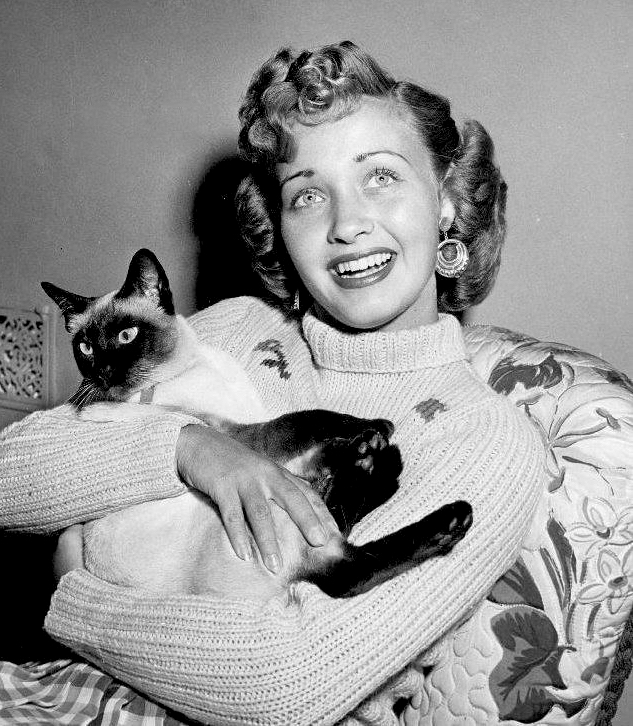
Powell in 1953

In 1951, Powell co-starred in the musical comedy Royal Wedding with Fred Astaire as performing siblings. She also appeared that year in Rich, Young and Pretty.

She starred in Small Town Girl and Three Sailors and a Girl in 1953. Powell starred in Seven Brides for Seven Brothers in 1954. In 2006, Seven Brides for Seven Brothers was named one of the greatest American musicals of all time by the American Film Institute. Powell starred in Athena and Deep in My Heart in 1954.

In 1955, Powell starred opposite Tony Martin, Debbie Reynolds, Ann Miller, and Russ Tamblyn in Hit the Deck, which was a commercial failure, underperforming at the box office. The following year, she recorded the song "True Love", which rose to number 15 on the Billboard charts and number 107 on the pop charts for that year, according to the Joel Whitburn compilation. This was her only single to make the charts. Also in 1956, Powell performed the song "I'll Never Stop Loving You" at the 28th Academy Awards. Next, Powell appeared in RKO Pictures' musical comedy The Girl Most Likely, playing a woman who becomes engaged to three men simultaneously. Though shot in 1956, the film was not released until 1958, after RKO went out of business.

Known mainly for her roles in musical comedies, Powell appeared in a rare dramatic role in the film noir The Female Animal (1958) from Universal Pictures, which marked the final film of co-star Hedy Lamarr.

=== 1959–1980 ===
By the late 1950s, after Powell's contract with MGM expired and her film offers began to slow, she turned to theater. Her first summer stock role was in a production of Oklahoma! in Dallas, Texas, in 1958. The following year, she co-starred with Tab Hunter, Patty Duke, and Myrna Loy in a television remake of the musical Meet Me in St. Louis. She starred in a stage production of The Most Happy Fella (1962). In 1962, Powell made her debut appearance on the television series The Red Skelton Show, in which she appeared in numerous episodes until 1972.

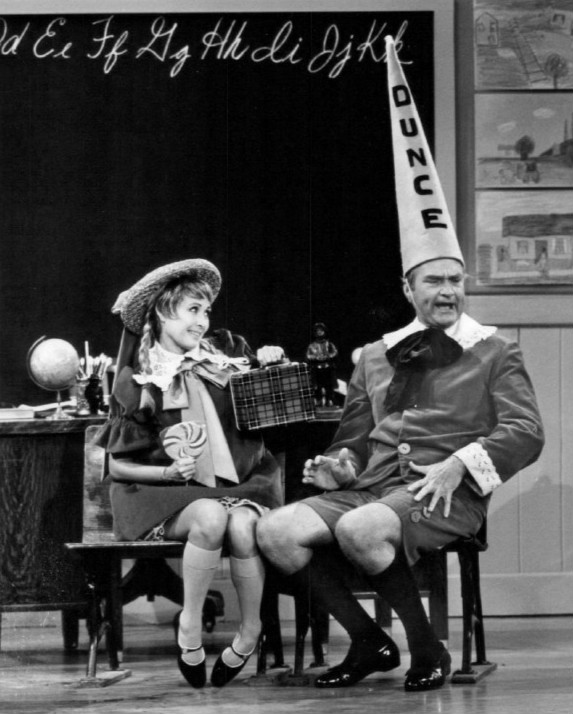
Powell plays a girlfriend to Red Skelton's "Junior" on The Red Skelton Show, 1968

In 1964, Powell starred as Eliza Doolittle in a production of My Fair Lady at Los Angeles' Valley West Theatre, which established a record gross for West Coast-based productions of the play. She also toured in 1964 in a musical review titled Just 20 Plus Me! It was done to a recorded track and featured Powell with 20 handsome "chorus boys". Asked after the performance if the production was going to be made available on a commercial recording, she said simply "No."

She had the title role in The Unsinkable Molly Brown in 1966, as well as the female lead in an Atlanta-based production of Carousel, followed by The Boy Friend at the Carousel Theater in Los Angeles in 1967. Also in 1967, she starred in a touring production of Brigadoon. Next, she portrayed Maria von Trapp in a production of The Sound of Music in 1968. In addition to her stage work, Powell appeared in three television films: Wheeler and Murdoch (1972), The Letters (1973), and Mayday at 40,000 Feet! (1976).

In 1972, Powell appeared in a Cincinnati-based stage production of Meet Me In St. Louis. The following year, Powell made her Broadway debut playing the title character in Irene, following Debbie Reynolds' performance in the title role. Mel Gussow of The New York Times praised Powell's performance, writing: "The two stars are an equal match for peppiness. Miss Reynolds may score a point for clowning, but Miss Powell wins two for softness."

Howard Keel and she appeared on stage together in a revival of Seven Brides for Seven Brothers, I Do! I Do! and South Pacific.

=== 1981–2021 ===
In the early 1980s, Powell toured in the comedies Same Time, Next Year; The Marriage-Go-Round, and Chapter Two.

Between 1981 and 1982, Powell had guest-starring role on The Love Boat and Fantasy Island. In 1985, she started a 9-month run in the daytime soap opera Loving, playing a tough mother and businesswoman, followed by another guest-starring part on Murder, She Wrote in 1985. In 1988, Powell was cast in a recurring guest role on the popular sitcom Growing Pains, in which she played Irma Seaver, the mother of Dr. Jason Roland Seaver (Alan Thicke). The same year, in May 1988, Powell married her longtime companion, former child actor Dickie Moore. The couple had met while Moore was performing research for his autobiography Twinkle, Twinkle, Little Star, but Don't Have Sex or Take the Car.

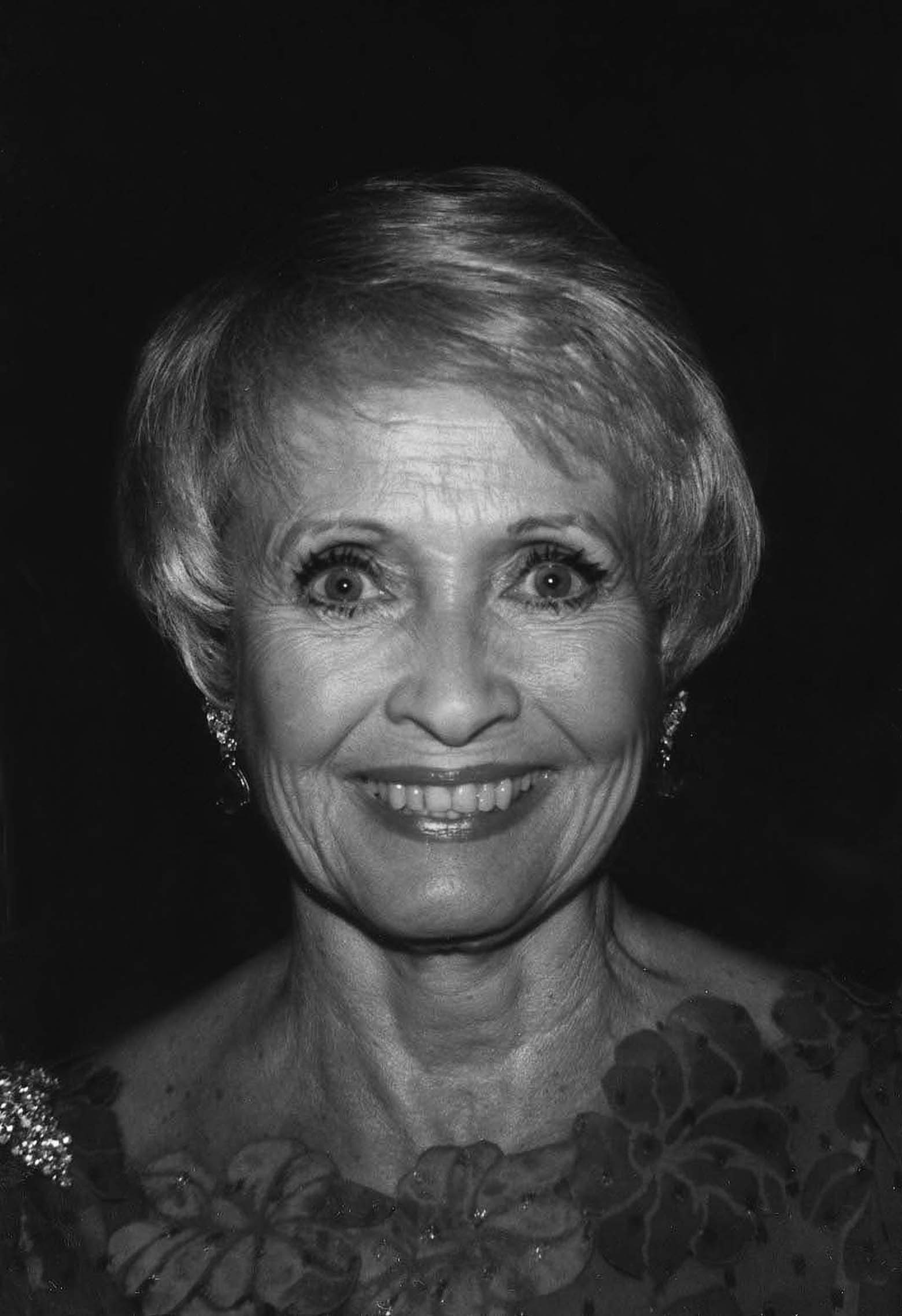
Powell in September 1998

In the early 1990s, Powell was a temporary replacement on the soap opera As the World Turns for Eileen Fulton as Lisa Grimaldi. In 1996 and 1997, she appeared in the off-Broadway production After-Play. She also performed the role of the Queen in Rodgers and Hammerstein's Cinderella at New York City Opera. In 2000, Powell appeared in the Off-Broadway production Avow, in which she portrayed a devout Catholic woman whose gay son wishes to marry his partner in the church. This was followed by a stage production of 70, Girls, 70, the same year. In 2002, she guest-starred on Law & Order: Special Victims Unit, followed by a role in the Showtime film The Sandy Bottom Orchestra (2003).

In 2003, she made a return to the stage as Mama Mizner in the Stephen Sondheim musical Bounce, which held performances in Chicago and Washington, DC. "I auditioned just to meet Sondheim, who was nice and a very funny man,” Powell admitted. "But I was disappointed when I got the part. I didn't really want to be away from home, but I had never done a new show and that seemed exciting at first. But I didn't have much to do and the part wasn't too jovial."

On New Year's Eve 2007, Powell returned to her hometown of Portland, Oregon, to narrate Sergei Prokofiev's Peter and the Wolf with the Portland-based musical group Pink Martini. She also appeared on March 9, 2008, with Pink Martini at Avery Fisher Hall in New York City, singing a duet of "Aba Daba Honeymoon" with lead singer China Forbes.

In March 2009, she appeared and sang "Love Is Where You Find It" in a show in which Michael Feinstein celebrated movie musicals and MGM musicals in particular. She performed again with Pink Martini at the Hollywood Bowl on September 10, 2010. Powell filled in as guest host on Turner Classic Movies for Robert Osborne when he was on medical leave from July 17–23, 2011.

== Personal life and death ==
On November 5, 1949, Powell married former figure skater Gearhardt Anthony Steffen. The union produced two children, Gearhardt III (born July 21, 1951) and Suzanne Ilene (born November 21, 1952). In 1953, Powell began an affair with Gene Nelson, her married co-star in Three Sailors and a Girl. Powell and Nelson planned to marry after divorcing their spouses, but after divorcing his wife, Nelson backed out of marrying Powell.

Powell married car dealer Patrick W. Nerney on November 8, 1954. Their daughter, Lindsay Averill, was born on February 1, 1956. Powell and Nerney divorced in May 1963.

In 1965, Powell married Hollywood publicist and manager Jim Fitzgerald, who managed her career. They divorced in 1975. She married David Stellar Parlour in 1978 and divorced him in 1981.

Powell married former child star Dickie Moore in 1988. After Moore died in 2015, Powell moved to their home in Wilton, Connecticut, where she died of natural causes on September 16, 2021, at the age of 92.

== Legacy ==
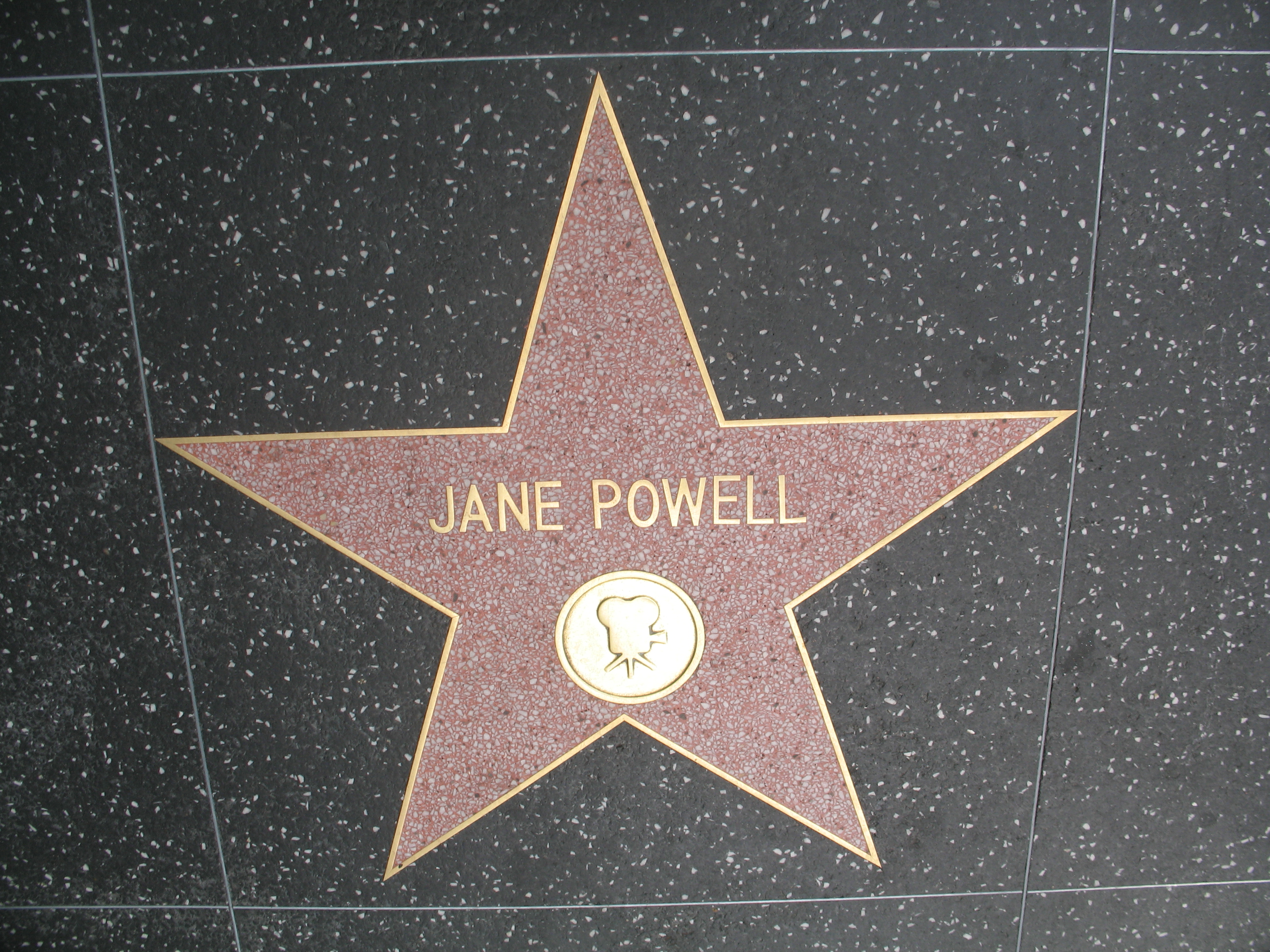
Powell's star on the Hollywood Walk of Fame

Powell was referred to as one of the last surviving stars of the Golden Age of Hollywood. She secured her place in history with her performance in Seven Brides for Seven Brothers.

Despite bouts with severe depression, anxiety and insecurity, Powell retained a public image of the all-American girl-next-door and was a symbol of simpler times. Powell's role in Song of the Open Road in 1944, a film that presented Powell as a wholesome girl next door, was suspected to have pigeon-holed her in future musicals.

In 1960, Powell was awarded a star on the Hollywood Walk of Fame.

== Filmography ==
Year	Film	Role	Director	Notes	Ref.
1944	Song of the Open Road	Jane Powell	S. Sylvan Simon		
1945	Delightfully Dangerous	Sherry Williams	Arthur Lubin		
1946	Holiday in Mexico	Christine Evans	George Sidney		
1948	Three Daring Daughters	Tess Morgan	Fred M. Wilcox		
1948	A Date with Judy	Judy Foster	Richard Thorpe		
1948	Luxury Liner	Polly Bradford	Richard Whorf		
1950	Nancy Goes to Rio	Nancy Barklay	Robert Z. Leonard		
1950	Two Weeks with Love	Patti Robinson	Roy Rowland		
1951	Royal Wedding	Ellen Bowen	Stanley Donen		
1951	Rich, Young and Pretty	Elizabeth Rogers	Norman Taurog		
1953	Small Town Girl	Cindy Kimbell	László Kardos		
1953	Three Sailors and a Girl	Penny Weston	Roy Del Ruth		
1954	Seven Brides for Seven Brothers	Milly Pontipee	Stanley Donen		
1954	Athena	Athena Mulvain	Richard Thorpe		
1954	Deep in My Heart	Ottilie van Zandt in Maytime	Stanley Donen		
1955	Hit the Deck	Susan Smith	Roy Rowland		
1958	The Girl Most Likely	Dodie	Mitchell Leisen		
1958	The Female Animal	Penny Windsor	Harry Keller		
1958	Enchanted Island	Fayaway	Allan Dwan	Alternate title: Typee	
1959	Meet Me in St. Louis		George Schaefer	Television movie	
1975	Tubby the Tuba	Celeste	Alexander Schure	Voice role	
1999	Picture This		Lisa Albright	Cameo	
2003	Broadway: The Golden Age, by the Legends Who Were There	Herself	Rick McKay	Documentary	

=== Short subjects ===
- Screen Snapshots: Motion Picture Mothers, Inc. (1949)
- 1955 Motion Picture Theatre Celebration (1955)

=== Stage work ===
- Allegro (1951 radio play)
- Oklahoma! (1958)
- The Most Happy Fella (1962)
- The Unsinkable Molly Brown (1963; 1966; 1981)
- Carousel (1966)
- The Boy Friend (1967)
- The Sound of Music (1968; 1972)
- My Fair Lady (1969; 1971)
- I Do! I Do! (1970)
- Meet Me in St. Louis (1972)
- Brigadoon (1973)
- Irene (1974; 1975–76)
- Seven Brides for Seven Brothers (1978)
- South Pacific (1978)
- The Marriage-Go-Round (1981)
- Sweethearts (1983)
- Cinderella (1995)
- After-Play (1996)
- Nothing Like a Dame (1998)
- Ancestral Voices (2000)
- Avow (2000)
- 70, Girls, 70 (2000)
- Bounce (2003; 2004)

=== Television ===
Year	Title	Role	Notes	Ref.
1978	Fantasy Island	Mrs. Joan Wade	Episode: "Mr. Irresistible/Bet a Million""	
1981	Fantasy Island	Margaret Chase Wilkerson	Episode: "Loving Strangers/Something Borrowed, Something Blue"	
1982	Fantasy Island	Eunice Picard	Episode: "The Challenge/A Genie Named Joe"	
1987	Murder, She Wrote	Rev. Mother Claire	Episode: "Old Habits Die Hard"	
1988-1990	Growing Pains	Irma		
2002	Law & Order: Special Victims Unit	Bess Sherman	Episode: "Vulnerable"	

== Radio ==
- 1944 — Powell played the title role in Snow White and the Seven Dwarfs on Screen Guild Theatre on CBS.
- 1947 — Powell co-starred with Frank Sinatra in Songs by Sinatra.
- 1952 — Lux Radio Theatre (episode Royal Wedding)

Jane Powell played main roles as guest star in four musicals with Gordon MacRae in a series of musicals (The Railroad Hour) on radio in 1949: Sweethearts, Music in the Air, Brigadoon and Good News.

== Recordings ==
- 1949: Romance — Columbia Masterworks LP (ML 2034)
- 1949: A Date with Jane Powell — Columbia Masterworks LP (ML 2045)
- 1956: Can't We Be Friends? — Verve Records LP (MGV 2023), re-released as a Limited Edition Japanese import CD in a mini-LP slip case in 2004.
- 1956: Something Wonderful (with David Rose and His Orchestra) — MGM Records (E3451)
- 2000: Hansel and Gretel/Alice in Wonderland — Collectables Records CD
- 2001: Romance/A Date with Jane Powell — Collectables Records CD (COL-CD-6670 / Sony A-50271)

== Sources ==
- Dick, Robert (2018). That Was Entertainment: The Golden Age of the MGM Musical. Jackson, Mississippi: University Press of Mississippi. ISBN 978-1-496-81736-5.
- Powell, Jane (1988). The Girl Next Door and How She Grew. New York: William Morrow & Co. ISBN 978-0-68806-757-1.
- Williams, Esther (1999). The Million Dollar Mermaid: An Autobiography (1st ed.). New York: Simon & Schuster. ISBN 978-0-15-601135-8. OCLC 43706619.
