= When Yankee Doodle Learns to "Parlez Vous Français" =

"When Yankee Doodle Learns to 'Parlez Vous Français' "
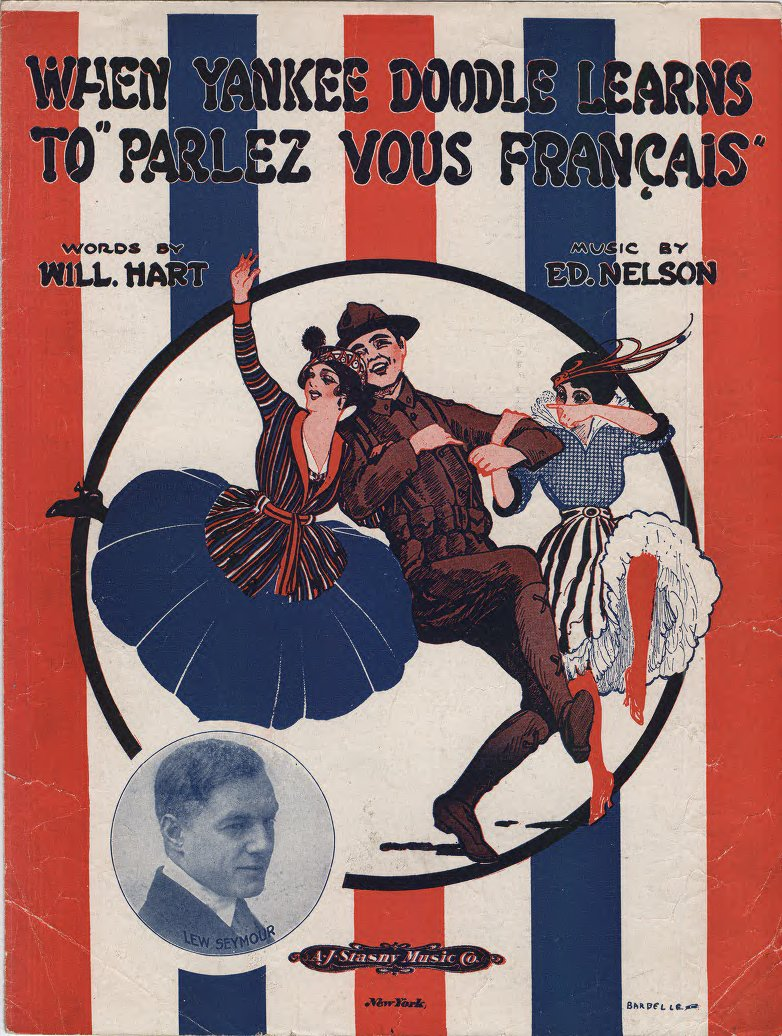
- Cover art of sheet music

Song
- Published: 1917
- Label: A.J. Stasny Music Co.
- Songwriter: Will Hart
- Composer: Ed Nelson

"When Yankee Doodle Learns to 'Parlez Vous Français' " is a World War I song published by A.J. Stasny Music Co. Based on estimates of sales, a performance of the song by Arthur Fields in 1918 was ranked #8 in the United States when it was featured on his Oh! Frenchy album, released by Victor. The lyrics playfully present American soldiers learning French so that they may flirt with women while in France.

The song, lyrics and cover art are in the public domain.

== Composition ==
CAPTION=Recording of the song

The song was published in 1917 by A.J. Stasny Music Co. in New York City. It features music by Ed Nelson and words by Will Hart.

== Performances and commercial success ==
Anna Chandler, Julia Dika, and Lew Seymour performed the song and were highlighted on sheet music variants.

It was recorded by Arthur Fields.

The song appeared in the 1948 movie When My Baby Smiles at Me.

== Bibliography ==
- Nelson, Ed G., and Will Hart. When Yankee Doodle Learns to "Parlez Vous Français". New York: A.J. Stasny Music Co, 1917. OCLC 7427244
