= When I Send You a Picture of Berlin (You'll Know It's Over, "Over There" I'm Coming Home) =

"When I Send You a Picture of Berlin: You'll Know It's Over, Over There"
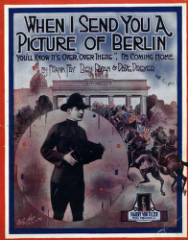
- Sheet Music cover

Song
- Language: English
- Published: 1918
- Songwriters: Frank Fay, Ben Ryan, Dave Dreyer

When I Send You a Picture of Berlin (You'll Know It's Over, "Over There" I'm Coming Home) is a World War I song written and composed by Frank Fay, Ben Ryan and Dave Dreyer. Written for voice and piano, this song was published in 1918 by Harry Von Tilzer Music Publishing Co., in New York, NY. The cover, illustrated by Pfeiffer Illustrating Co., depicts a soldier with a camera while in the background the cavalry rides through a monument. The song was recorded by Arthur Fields and Peerless Quartet.

The sheet music can be found at the Pritzker Military Museum & Library.
