= Two Weeks with Love =

1950 film by Roy Rowland

- Theatrical release poster
- Directed by: Roy Rowland
- Screenplay by: John Larkin; Dorothy Kingsley
- Story by: John Larkin
- Produced by: Jack Cummings
- Starring: Jane Powell; Ricardo Montalbán; Louis Calhern; Ann Harding
- Cinematography: Alfred Gilks
- Edited by: Cotton Warburton
- Music by: George Stoll
- Production company: Metro-Goldwyn-Mayer
- Distributed by: Loew's Inc.
- Release date: November 10, 1950
- Running time: 92 minutes
- Country: United States
- Language: English
- Budget: $1,405,000
- Box office: $2,795,000 (distributor rentals)

Two Weeks with Love is a 1950 American musical romantic comedy film directed by Roy Rowland and based on the story "The Tender Hours" by John Larkin, who co-wrote the screenplay with Dorothy Kingsley. The film stars Jane Powell, Ricardo Montalbán, Louis Calhern, and Ann Harding.

== Plot ==
The Robinson family is lodging at the Stanley House Hotel in a Catskills resort town for their annual two-week vacation. The resort owner's son Billy is enamored with 17-year-old Patti Robinson, who declines all of his invitations, considering him too young. Younger sister Melba is interested in Billy, but he is determined to pursue Patti.

Patti and her friend Valerie, a slightly older actress, compete for the attention of Demi, a handsome Cuban newly arrived at the resort. Valerie gives Patti poor advice on dealing with men and frequently mentions that Patti is still a child.

Despite his wife's objections, Mr. Robinson buys a corset for Patti but inadvertently selects a surgical corset, which has steel bone stays that lock when the wearer bends too far.

Valerie convinces the resort owner to remove Patti from a variety show, but when Valerie cannot find her dancing shoes, she refuses to perform, and Patti takes her place in a dance with Demi. During the dance, Patti's corset locks and she is carried from the stage. Mrs. Robinson releases Patti from the corset and promises to buy her a proper corset the next day. Demi receives permission from Patti's parents to date her when they return to the city.

== Cast ==
- Jane Powell as Patti Robinson
- Ricardo Montalbán as Demi Armendez
- Louis Calhern as Horatio Robinson
- Ann Harding as Katherine Robinson
- Phyllis Kirk as Valerie Stresemann
- Carleton Carpenter as Billy Finlay
- Debbie Reynolds as Melba Robinson
- Clinton Sundberg as Mr. Finlay
- Gary Gray as McCormick Robinson
- Tommy Rettig as Ricky Robinson
- Charles Smith as Eddie Gavin

== Production ==
The film project, with a working title of The Tender Hours, was announced in December 1948 as a vehicle for Elizabeth Taylor, with Jack Cummings slated to direct.

The script is based on writer John Larkin's story "The Tender Hours", which had the Catskills town of Stanford, New York as its setting. The town had been known as "the Havana of America" during the time at which the story is set, as it was popular with wealthy traveling Cubans and South Americans.

== Reception ==
In a contemporary review for The New York Times, critic A. H. Weiler wrote:

Metro-Goldwyn-Mayer, whose corporate heart undoubtedly is young and gay and has a large niche in it for Jane Powell, is treating its youthful singing star to a frivolous excursion complete with songs and none too witty sayings in "Two Weeks With Love." Which is to say that the Thanksgiving newcomer ... is no turkey but is hardly substantial fare being long on obvious misunderstandings and juvenile amour and short on imagination. Despite the quaint period costuming, pleasing Technicolor and pre-World War I score, it is still a trifling fable about the tribulations, romantic and otherwise, of a family vacationing in the Catskills, in which the enthusiasm of the cast is superior to its assignment.

Estimates by Variety estimated that the film would earn $2,400,000 in distributor rentals before the end of the year. MGM records indicate that the film earned $1,695,000 in the U.S. and Canada and $1,100,000 elsewhere, resulting in a profit of $199,000.

When the 1914 song "Aba Daba Honeymoon" became a hit after the release of the film, MGM sent Debbie Reynolds and Carleton Carpenter on a multicity personal appearance tour of Loews theaters to capitalize on the success of the song and film, beginning at the Oriental Theater in Chicago.

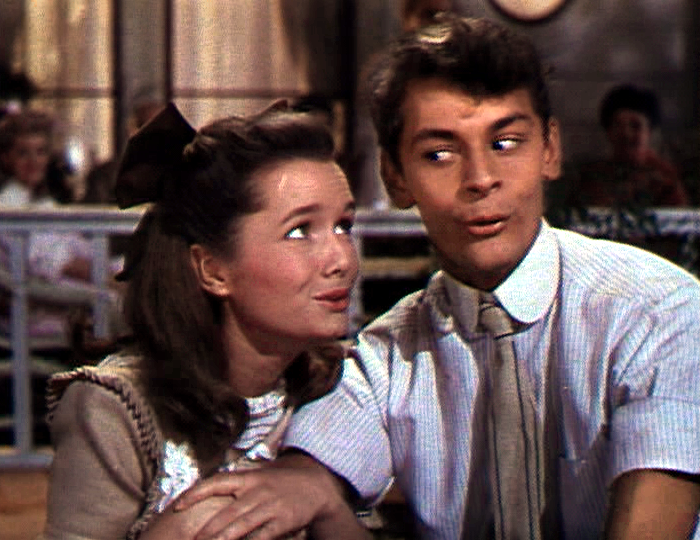
Debbie Reynolds and Carleton Carpenter singing "Aba Daba Honeymoon"

== Music ==
- "Aba Daba Honeymoon", music by Walter Donovan, lyrics by Arthur Fields, sung by Debbie Reynolds, Carleton Carpenter and others
- "The Oceana Roll", music by Lucien Denni, lyrics by Roger Lewis, sung by Jane Powell and others
- "A Heart That's Free", music by Alfred G. Robyn, lyrics by Thomas Railey, sung by Jane Powell
- "Row, Row, Row", music by James V. Monaco, lyrics by William Jerome, performed by Debbie Reynolds and Carleton Carpenter
- "Leichte Kavallerie Overture", music by Franz von Suppé
- "That's How I Need You", music by Al Piantadosi, lyrics by Joseph McCarthy and Joe Goodwin, sung by Debbie Reynolds
- "By the Light of the Silvery Moon", music by Gus Edwards, lyrics by Edward Madden, sung by Louis Calhern, Ann Harding, Ricardo Montalbán, Phyllis Kirk, Jane Powell and chorus
- "My Beautiful Lady", music by Ivan Caryll, lyrics by C.M.S. McLellan, sung by the chorus
- "My Hero", music by Oscar Straus, lyrics by Hugh Stanislaus Stange, performed by Jane Powell and Ricardo Montalbán
- "Sobre las olas" (uncredited), music by Juventino Rosas
- "Listen to the Mockingbird", music by Richard Milburn, lyrics by Septimus Winner
- "Destiny" (waltz), music by Sydney Baynes
- "A media luz" (tango), music by Edgardo Donatto, lyrics by Carlos Lenzi, danced by Jane Powell and Ricardo Montalbán

Two Weeks with Love
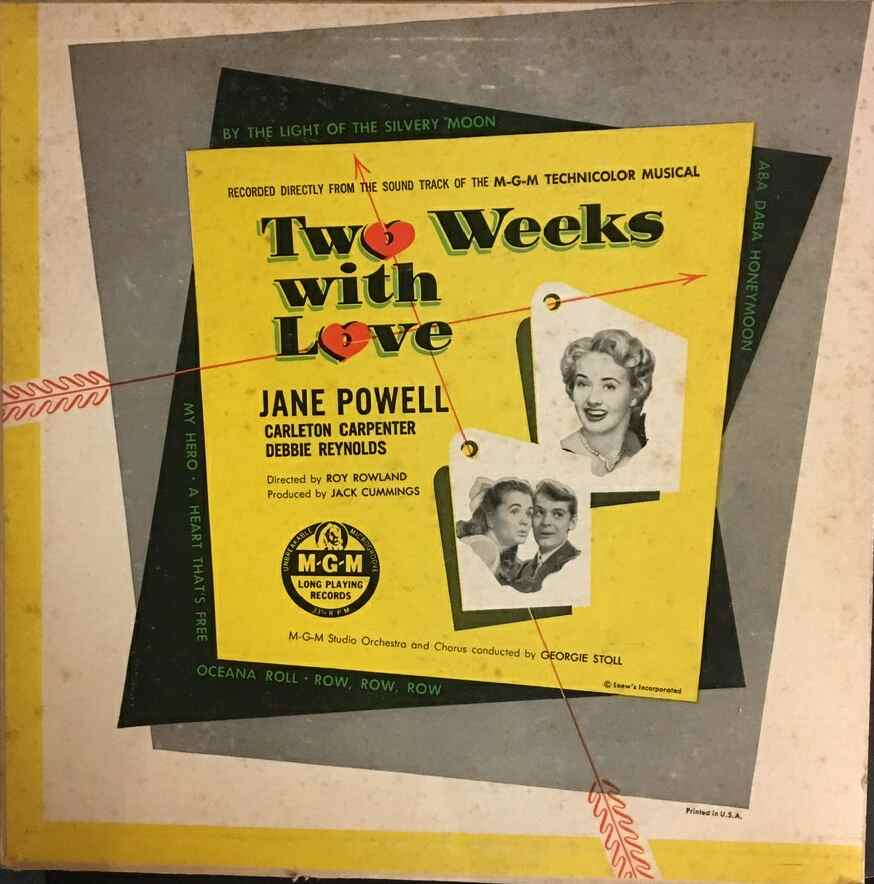

Soundtrack album by Jane Powell, Debbie Reynolds, Carleton Carpenter, George Stoll and the M-G-M Studio Orchestra
- Released: 1950
- Genres: Soundtrack; traditional pop; musical theater
- Label: MGM

=== Soundtrack album ===
A soundtrack album was issued in 10-inch LP format on MGM Records. All tracks are backed by the M-G-M Studio Orchestra under the direction of Georgie Stoll.

==== Side 1 ====
1. "A Heart That's Free" (Robyn - Railey) – performed by Jane Powell
2. "Row, Row, Row" (Monaco - Jerome) – performed by Debbie Reynolds and Carleton Carpenter
3. "Oceana Roll" (Denni - Lewis) – performed by Jane Powell

==== Side 2 ====
1. "By the Light of the Silvery Moon" (Edwards - Madden) – performed by Jane Powell
2. "Aba Daba Honeymoon" (Donovan - Fields) – performed by Debbie Reynolds and Carleton Carpenter
3. "My Hero" (Straus - Stange) – performed by Jane Powell

== Awards ==
"Aba Daba Honeymoon" was nominated by the American Film Institute for inclusion in its AFI's 100 Years...100 Songs list in 2004.

== Comic-book adaption ==
- Eastern Color Movie Love #6 (December 1950)
