= Good Morning Mr. Zip-Zip-Zip! =

Ragtime song

""Good Morning Mr. Zip-Zip-Zip""
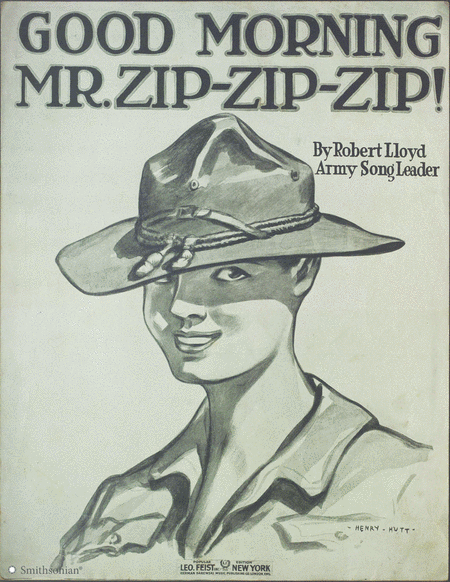
- Sheet music cover, 1918

Song
- Published: 1918
- Genre: Ragtime
- Songwriter(s): Robert Lloyd

"Good Morning Mr. Zip-Zip-Zip" is a ragtime song published as sheet music in 1918 by Leo Feist Inc. of New York City. It was one of the most popular tunes with United States soldiers during the World War I era.

The song appears to salute American soldiers, although some have suggested that it has a more cynical meaning, in that it criticizes their transformation into an identical, conforming mass.

== Background and composition ==
According to the sheet music, it was "written around a Fort Niagara fragment" by Robert Lloyd, "Army song leader." Sheet music was available for piano, band, orchestra, and male quartette as well as for talking machine or player piano.

In 1918, both Victor Records (VI18510) and Columbia Records (A-2530) issued recordings of the song by Arthur Fields and the Peerless Quartet. The musical score was reprinted in a war edition.

== Lyric ==
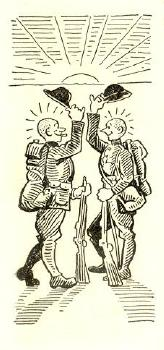

We come from ev'ry quarter,
From North, South, East and West,
To clear the way to freedom
For the land we love the best.
We've left our occupations
and home, so far and dear,
But when the going's rather rough,
We raise this song in cheer:

[chorus: repeat twice]
Good morning, Mister Zip-Zip-Zip,
With your hair cut just as short as mine,
Good morning, Mister Zip-Zip-Zip,
You're surely looking fine!
Ashes to ashes, and dust to dust,
If the Camels don't get you,
The Fatimas must,
Good morning, Mister Zip-Zip-Zip,
With your hair cut just as short as,
your hair cut just as short as,
your hair cut just as short as mine.

You see them on the highway,
You meet them down the pike,
In olive drab and khaki
Are soldiers on the hike;
And as the column passes,
The word goes down the line,
Good morning, Mister Zip-Zip-Zip,
You're surely looking fine.

[repeat chorus twice]

The reference to "Camels" and "Fatimas" (fa-tee'-mas) is to popular brands of cigarettes of the time.

== Cover versions and use in pop culture ==
During World War II, a historian lamenting that there were no popular patriotic songs asked "Where in this war is 'Mr Zip-Zip-Zip'?".

Film critic Richard Schickel titled his autobiographical account of his childhood Good Morning, Mr. Zip Zip Zip: Movies, Memory, and World War II.

It was sung (in part) in John Cassavetes' film Husbands (film).

It was parodied by the Washington DC group Bill Holland and Rent's Due as "Good Mornin' Mr. Snip Snip Snip." The chorus of the Tom Waits song "Barbershop" contains the lines "Good morning, Mister snip snip snip/With your hair cut just as short as mine."
