= Fred Hall (musician) =

American pianist, bandleader and composer

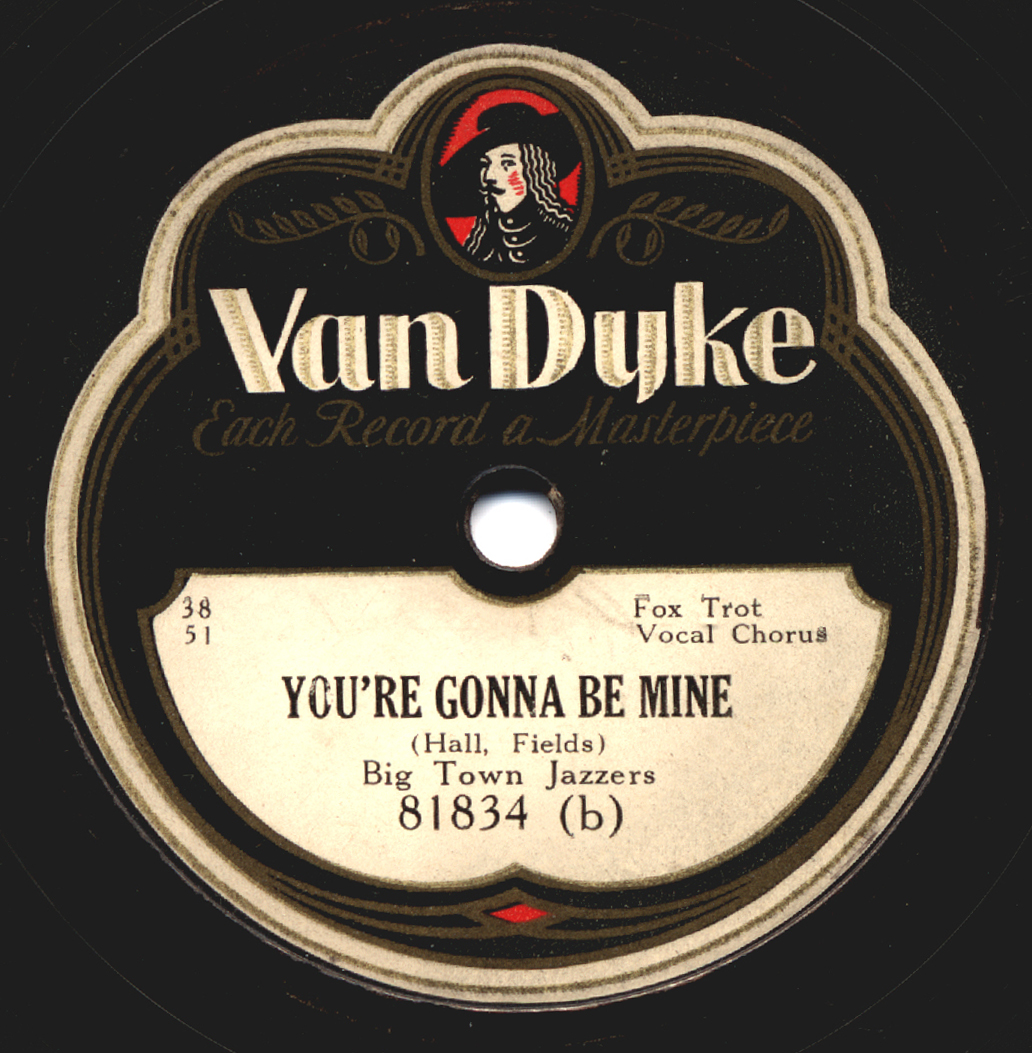
Van Dyke record featuring the tune You're Gonna Be Mine written by Fred Hall and Arthur Fields. Although the performance is credited to "Big Town Jazzers" the tune is actually played by Hall's band as well.

Fred Hall (actual name Fred Arthur Ahl, 1898–1954) was an American pianist, bandleader and composer. Hall was born in New York City and began his musical career working as a song-plugger for various music publishers. As a bandleader Hall and his men recorded prolifically for many labels (see below) from 1925 onwards. Many recordings featured vocalist Arthur Fields with whom Hall enjoyed a lengthy partnership, co-writing scores of songs, the better known ones including Eleven More Months And Ten More Days and I Got A Code In My Dose. Hall and Fields also appeared together on the NBC radio show The Sunday Driver.

Notable musicians in Hall's band included trumpeters Mike Mosiello and Leo McConville. Apart from playing piano, conducting and composing Hall sometimes performed scat singing on his records. A selection of Hall's recorded work has been reissued on CD by The Old Masters label.

Hall made his last recordings in 1932, after which little is known of him. It is recorded that he joined ASCAP in 1939. He died in New York on October 6, 1954, at the age of 56.

== Band names used on records ==
Hall's records were issued under a variety of names (including pseudonyms). Discographer Brian Rust reports the following:

- Fred "Sugar" Hall and His Sugar Babies (Okeh)
- Fred Hall's Orchestra/and His Orchestra (Harmony, Bell, Goodson (UK))
- Fred Hall and His Roseland Orchestra (Emerson and Bell)
- Fred Hall's Jazz Band (Banner and associated labels)
- Arthur Fields and His Orchestra (Perfect)
- Arthur Fields and His Assassinators (Edison)
- Arthur Fields and The Noodlers (Banner and associated labels)
- Claremont Dance Band/Orchestra (Duophone)
- The Home Towners (Cameo and associated labels, Banner and associated labels)
- Honey Swamp Stompers (Harmony)
- The Tin Pan Paraders (Gennett)

There were also several Hall recordings issued anonymously on Grey Gull and related labels. The records issued on the Harmony, Diva and Velvet Tone labels as "Jerome Conrad and His Orchestra" were also earlier ascribed to Hall by Rust, but has in later editions been revised as being by a Harry Reser group.

Hall also recorded and broadcast with Fields as a country ensemble called Rex Cole's Mountaineers.

== Sources ==
- Randy Skretvedt: Liner notes to the CD Fred Hall's Sugar Babies featuring Arthur Fields (TOM mb 106)
- Brian Rust: The American Dance Band Discography (2 vol), New Rochelle, New York 1975
