= Ruth Roye =

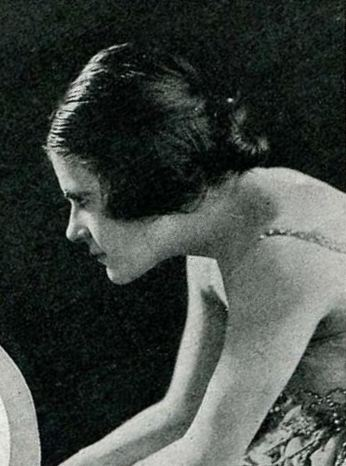
- Roye in 1919

Background information
- Birth name: Ruth Becker
- Born: January 9, 1896; Philadelphia, U.S.
- Died: June 12, 1960 (aged 64); New York City, U.S.
- Occupation: Singer
- Instrument: Vocals
- Years active: 1913–1926

Ruth Roye (née Becker; January 9, 1896 – June 12, 1960) was an American vaudeville singer and comic performer who was billed as the "Princess of Ragtime". She had a successful career before marrying and retiring from show business.

== Life and career ==
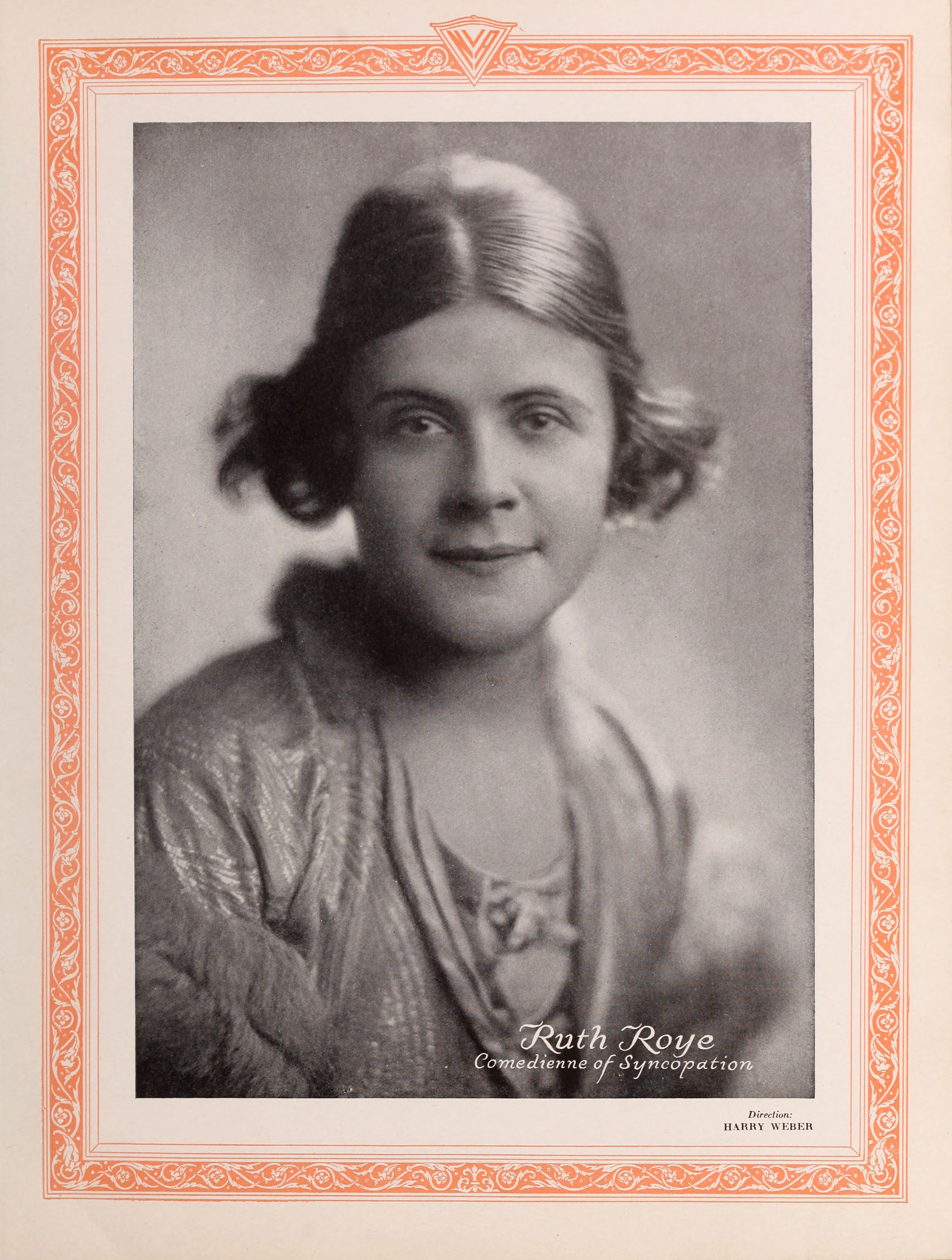
Ruth Roye

Born in Philadelphia to Russian Jewish immigrants, she and her family moved to New York City in the early 1900s. She started work in the family's nickelodeon, and made her stage debut as a singer and comedienne at the Union Square Theatre in 1913.

She rapidly became successful, toured vaudeville venues, and came to be billed as the "Princess of Ragtime" or the "Empress of Ragtime". One critic said of her that "as a dainty and charming girl [she] is hard to beat, and her conception of popular songs is distinctly original... [She] is gifted with a personality that has been declared by critics to be a dynamo of magnetism...". She was a friendly rival of Belle Baker and, like Baker, had songs written for her by Irving Berlin. Her most successful songs included "Aba Daba Honeymoon", which she launched in 1914, "Waiting for the Robert E. Lee", and "Ain't We Got Fun".

She married in 1921. She made a few recordings for Columbia Records until 1924, and performed in theatres until at least 1926. She had two daughters, and remarried in 1937, to Julius Kolleeny. She died in New York in 1960 at the age of 64, after a long period of ill health.
