= Hunting the Hun =

Song by Arthur Fields
- Published: 1918
- Genre: War song
- Label: Kalmar Puck & Abrahams
- Songwriter(s): Lyricist: Howard E. Rogers; Composer: Archie Gottler
- Lyricist(s): Howard E. Rogers

"Hunting the Hun" is the name of a war song that was popular during World War I. It was performed by Arthur Fields, music by Archie Gottler and words by Howard E. Rogers. It was published by Kalmar Puck & Abrahams in New York in 1918.

"Hun" was a wartime dysphemism meaning "German".

== Lyrics ==
Hunting The Hun

Over in France there's a game that's played
By all the soldier boys in each brigade
It's called Hunting the Hun
This is how it is done!

First you go get a gun
Then you look for a Hun
Then you start on the run for the son of a gun
You can capture them with ease
All you need is just a little Limburger cheese
Give 'em one little smell
They come out with a yell
Then your work is done
When they start to advance
Shoot 'em in the pants
That's the game called Hunting the Hun!

First you go get a gun
Then you look for a Hun
Then you start on the run for the son of a gun
You can capture them with ease
All you need is just a little Limburger cheese
Give 'em one little smell
They come out with a yell
Then your work is done
When they start to advance
Shoot 'em in the pants
That's the game called Hunting the Hun!

I met a soldier and he told me
It's just the latest thing across the sea
It's the game that is new
They're all doing it too!

First you go get a gun
Then you look for a Hun
Then you start on the run for the son of a gun
You can capture them with ease
All you need is just a little Limburger cheese
Give 'em one little smell
They come out with a yell
Then your work is done
When they start to advance
Shoot 'em in the pants
That's the game called Hunting the Hun!

First you go get a gun
Then you look for a Hun
Then you start on the run for the son of a gun
If you want to bring them out
Offer them a little bit of hot sauerkraut
They come over the top with a pip and a hop
Then your work is done
When they stop in to eat
Cut off their retreat
That's the game called Hunting the Hun!

First you go get a gun
Then you look for a Hun
Then you start on the run for the son of a gun
You can always make them pain
Let them know there's going to be a pinochle game
They come over the top with a pip and a hop
Then your work is done
When they first show their face
Crump 'em with a mace
That's the game called Hunting the Hun!
