= Rex Cole's Mountaineers =

- Origin: New York City, New York, U.S.
- Genres: Country
- Years active: 1929–1933
- Labels: Columbia, Okeh, Clarion Records, Diva, ARC
- Past members: Arthur Fields; Fred Hall

Rex Cole's Mountaineers was an American country music band.

The Mountaineers were actually the creation of two New Yorkers, vaudeville singer Arthur Fields and songwriter/bandleader/manager Fred Hall. Fields had had a recording contract with several high-profile labels but never had a hit; Hall played jazz in the vein of Jan Garber. In 1928, Hall recorded a few country music tunes, and by 1929 he had united with Fields in a band that was playing big-band renditions of folk songs.

After a few sides on Columbia Records and Okeh Records, Hall reduced the size of his orchestra in order to back Fields with a small, more authentic-sounding hillbilly ensemble, which included violin, guitar, bass, accordion, harmonica, and trumpet. Hall and Fields then began recording with both the large and the small bands, with the small group recording under a plethora of names, such as Eddie Younger & his Mountaineers, Sam Cole & his Cornhuskers, the Gaunt Brothers, the Colt Brothers, and Jim Cole's Tennessee Mountaineers. Records appeared on Clarion, Diva, and ARC.

Early in 1930, a refrigerator salesman and broadcaster named Rex Cole asked to sponsor the group for a show on New York radio station WEAF. He was looking for something along the lines of the Beverly Hillbillies, another group who were put together in a big city (in their case, Los Angeles) but made to sound as if they were plucked from the American South. Cole had Fields and Hall's group billed as "Rex Cole's Mountaineers", and their first broadcasts came in July 1930. Most of their material was written by Fields and Hall themselves, who went by the stage names Long Tom and Joe Colt on the show. They quickly became one of WEAF's most popular acts, and by 1931 had signed to a lucrative new contract. They also appeared in one film short.

The Mountaineers' show differed from some other popular country radio broadcasts in being primarily parodic in its intent; it made exaggerated references to stereotypes about rural America for comic effect. As a show made by and for urban Northerners, it sought to lampoon Southern life much in the way Li'l Abner would some years later.

Around 1933, Fields and Hall had departed, and Cole had a new cast of Mountaineers which included Tex Fletcher; this group made no recordings, and their last broadcasts came in mid-1934. They continued to play smaller venues in the city for another year or so, and then disappear from the record.
