= It's a Long Way to Berlin, but We'll Get There! =

1917 song written by Arthur Fields and composed by Leon Flatow

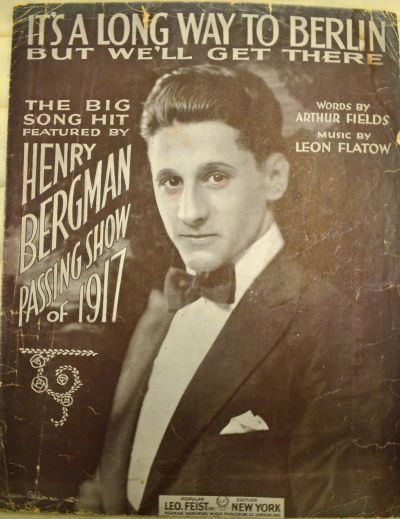
- Sheet music cover

Song
- Released: 1917
- Recorded: September 26, 1917
- Length: 2:53
- Label: Victor
- Composer: Leon Flatow
- Lyricist: Arthur Fields

"It's a Long Way to Berlin, but We'll Get There!" is a World War I era song released in 1917, with lyrics by Arthur Fields and music by Leon Flatow. Leo Feist, Inc. of New York City published the song.

Rosenbaum Studios designed the sheet music cover. It features soldiers marching in formation. There is an inset photo of Maurice Burkhardt, Will J. Ward, Ed Morton, Jimmy Flynn, Willie Weston, or Francis Maguire that varies per edition. There is another version of the cover known as the "Popular edition". It features a photo of Henry Bergman.

The American Quartet recorded the song with conductor Rosario Bourdon. The bass vocals were John H. Meyer and William F. Hooley. The tenor vocals were Billy Murray and Albert Campbell. It was recorded on September 26, 1917, and released under the Victor Record label. Arthur Fields also recorded two versions of the song. The first was recorded on June 9, 1917, and released under Columbia label. The second version was recorded September 18, 1917 and released under the Edison Diamond Disc label, with Billy Murray, John Young, Steve Porter and Donald Chalmers in the chorus. Edison version was later re-released in 1918 for cylinders under the Edison Blue Amberol.

The song was instantly successful upon its release. It was reminiscent of the 1912 British war song, "It's a Long Way to Tipperary".

The sheet music can be found at the Pritzker Military Museum & Library.

The song is about Rueben Plank, a "husky Yank", who enlists in the army. He is determined to "get that Kaiser Bill". The chorus is what Corporal Plank and his squad sings, directed to Kaiser Wilhelm II:

It's a long way to Berlin, but we'll get there
Uncle Sam will show the way
Over the line, then across the Rhine,
Shouting Hip! Hip! Hooray!
We'll sing Yankee Doodle 'Under the Linden'
With some real live Yankee pep! Hep!
It's a long way to Berlin
But we'll get there
And I'm my way by heck- by heck
