= Heart of Wetona =

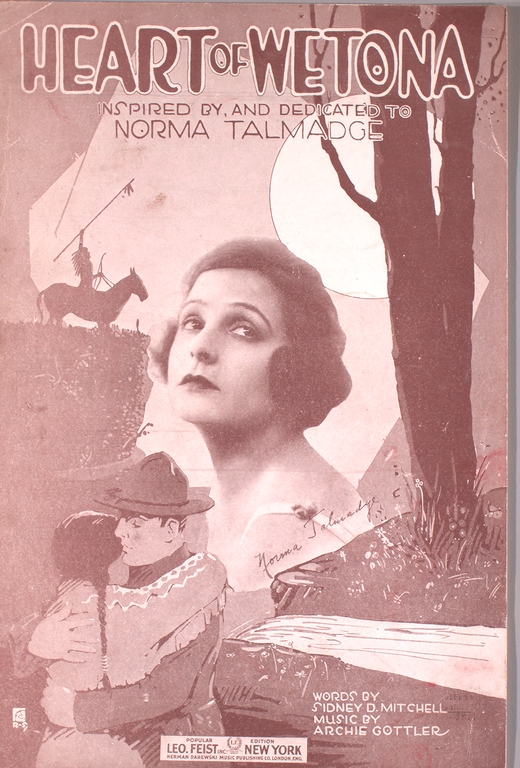
- Sheet music cover for "Heart of Wetona"

Song
- Released: 1919
- Label: Leo Feist, Inc.
- Songwriter(s): Composer: Archie Gottler; Lyricist: Sidney D. Mitchell
- Producer(s): Leo Feist

Heart of Wetona is a World War I era song released in 1919 by Leo Feist, Inc. of New York, New York. Sidney D. Mitchell wrote the lyrics. Archie Gottler composed the music. Rosenbaum Studios provided the cover art. On the cover is a soldier embracing a Native American woman. In the background is a Native American on horseback, holding a spear above his head. Featured in the center is a picture of American silent film actress, Norma Talmadge, who starred in the film The Heart of Wetona (1919), whom the song is dedicated to. The song was written for both voice and piano.

The song tells the story of a soldier who falls in love with a Native American princess. It is told from the soldier's point of view, and the chorus is a profession of his love. He promises that, although she is an "Indian Princess, royal and true," and he is a "Boy of America," he will be loyal to her for she was "made for" him.
