= Archie Gottler =

- Born: May 14, 1896; New York, New York, U.S.
- Died: June 24, 1959 (aged 63); Hollywood, California. U.S.
- Occupation: artist
- Years active: 1915–1959

Archie Gottler (May 14, 1896 – June 24, 1959) was an American composer, screenwriter, actor, and film director. Gottler is known for being the director of Woman Haters (1934), the first of a series of 190 Three Stooges comedy short films for Columbia Pictures.

His works include:

- Music for "Hunting the Hun", popular World War I song (1918)
- "Heart of Wetona," World War I song of 1919
