= Technical advisor =

Film crew member who ensures accuracy in diegesis

In film production, a technical advisor is someone who advises the director on the convincing portrayal of a subject. The advisor's expertise adds realism both to the acting and to the setting of a movie.

Nipo T. Strongheart was a noted technical advisor on several movies dealing with Native Americans.
