= Braveheart (1925 film) =

1925 film

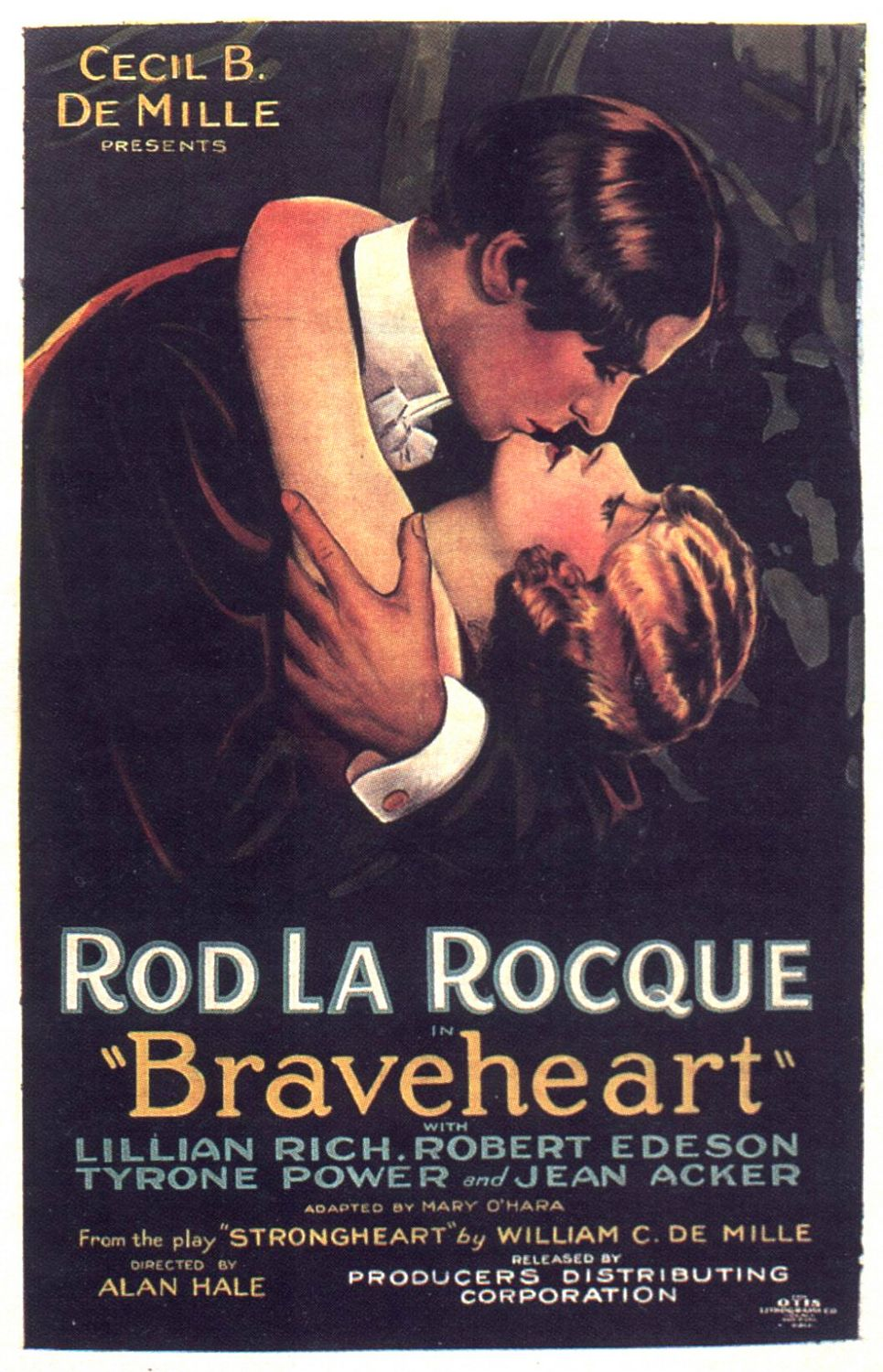
- Directed by: Alan Hale Sr.
- Screenplay by: Mary O'Hara
- Based on: Strongheart by William C. deMille
- Produced by: Cecil B. DeMille
- Starring: Rod La Rocque; Lillian Rich
- Cinematography: Faxon M. Dean
- Distributed by: Producers Distributing Corporation
- Release date: December 27, 1925
- Running time: 71 minutes
- Country: United States
- Language: Silent (English intertitles)

The opening segment of the film.

Braveheart is a 1925 American silent contemporary Western film directed by Alan Hale Sr. and starring Rod La Rocque. The story focuses on members of a tribe of Indians who are being intimidated by the owners of a canning company seeking to violate a treaty protecting the tribe's fishing grounds. Braveheart is a remake of the 1914 film Strongheart directed by James Kirkwood Sr. and produced by the American Mutoscope and Biograph Company. The two films are based on Strongheart, the first play of the producer Cecil B. DeMille's brother William C. deMille.

== Plot ==
As described in a film magazine review, Braveheart of the Yakama Indians falls in love with Dorothy Nelson, daughter of Hobart Nelson who is disputing certain fishing rights with the tribe. Braveheart goes to college and obtains fame as a member of the football team. He ends up being expelled after voluntarily shielding Dorothy's brother from disgrace after attempting to throw a football game for some gambling interests. Ki-Yote kidnaps Dorothy and her father. Braveheart fights Ki-Yote and rescues Dorothy and her father, but comes to understand fully the problems and sorrow any potential union with Dorothy would entail. He renounces any interest in Dorothy and marries Sky-Arrow.

== Cast ==
- Rod La Rocque as Braveheart
- Lillian Rich as Dorothy Nelson
- Robert Edeson as Hobart Nelson
- Arthur Housman as Frank Nelson
- Frank Hagney as Ki-Yote
- Tyrone Power Sr. as Standing Rock
- Jean Acker as Sky-Arrow
- Sally Rand as Sally Vernon
- Henry Victor as Sam Harris

Uncredited is Nipo T. Strongheart as the Medicine man.

== Production ==
Braveheart was directed by Alan Hale Sr. and produced by Cecil B. DeMille's production company DeMille Pictures Corporation. The movie was initially named "Strongheart" after a play written by Cecil's brother William C. deMille and produced on Broadway in 1905. Stage actor Robert Edeson had portrayed the leading role in deMille's Broadway play. However, as the success of the play continued, a remake of the 1914 film was undertaken. Nipo T. Strongheart, early in his work with Native American topics, was hired as a technical adviser, and he included elements referring to the Yakima Nation and had the hero succeed in preserving Indian fishing rights, a topic of recent interest to the tribe. The original movie was 30 min long, and the revised movie was 71 min. However, as the project neared completion, the name Strongheart had already appeared in film for a canine star. Subsequently, the Alan Hale film was retitled and released as Braveheart. Nipo T. Strongheart played a small role in the film as a Medicine Man. Strongheart suggested to the movie's screenwriter Mary O'Hara additions of Yakima history to the story (which were not in the 1905 original play). Braveheart's initial treatment was credited to C. Gardner Sullivan, a prolific screenwriter who had worked with producer Thomas H. Ince. American author and playwright Elmer Blaney Harris was a contributing writer and suggested numerous changes for Braveheart. Advertising for performance-lectures of Nipo Strongheart would occasionally have him in Indian costume as well as in a scene from the movie where he was dressed in normal attire.

The leading character of the movie was not dressed up in Indian costumes because it was a contemporary story (which was also in the original play). The lead role was performed by Rod La Rocque.

One scholar said had said that:

The court sequence is heavily and multiply textualized… conveying legal arguments and judgments that refer to treaties.… the judge's decision parses the meaning of the treaty text itself: "We have examined the Federal treaty with the Indians and find that it gives them the right to fish where and when they please, without limitation by State tax or private ownership."

== Preservation ==
Braveheart was restored by the "Washington Film Preservation Project" and shown at the Yakama Nation Native American Film Festival in 2006 and 2007.
