= Oreste Migliaccio =

American jazz pianist, composer and band leader (1882–1973)

Oreste Migliaccio (1882–1973) was a jazz pianist, composer and prominent band leader. His band Oreste and his Queensland Orchestra were popular in the 1920s and 1930s.

Migliaccio was born in Naples, Italy in 1882. He immigrated to the United States, arriving at Ellis Island, New York on September 22, 1902. Five years later he married and was working as a musician and composer in the 1910s.

He began composing as early as 1908 when his Gatling Gun Rag was published, followed in 1910 by Mexican Belle: Novelty Dance and Wholesale Love. He also wrote Tommy and co-wrote I've Got a Ragtime Bee in My Bonnet, both in 1911, with Georgia in 1917 and "So you're goin' to be married: (God bless you)" in 1918. He was still composing as late as 1927 when he co-wrote Rosy Cheeks with Harry D. Squires and J. Donald Parker.

In 1919 he was working at the Opera Stars Confectionery Company in New York. It wasn't until the early 1920s that he was successfully working as a musician and led a band at the Peek-Inn in New York. By 1926 he was leading the orchestra at the Queensland Ballroom on Wyckoff Avenue in Brooklyn, New York. It was at this period that he began recording a considerable number of record sides for Edison with his Queensland Orchestra, recording over thirty sides from 1926 to 1929. On two of these recordings Migliaccio played solo piano. Edison was still recording the old-fashioned mechanical way and a few of the recorded titles were rejected. Some of the musicians who played in the band during this time included Jimmy Dorsey, Red Nichols and Don Murray. Many more of his compositions were published and recorded.

So popular were the Oreste Queensland Orchestra's recordings that Jazz Oracle released some of their Edison recordings in 2005 on a CD album entitled Edison Hot Dance Obscurities, Volume 2.

By 1930 he was living in Bellaire, New York in a house he had purchased. He died in 1973.
