= Aba Daba Honeymoon =

1914 comic song recorded by Collins & Harlan

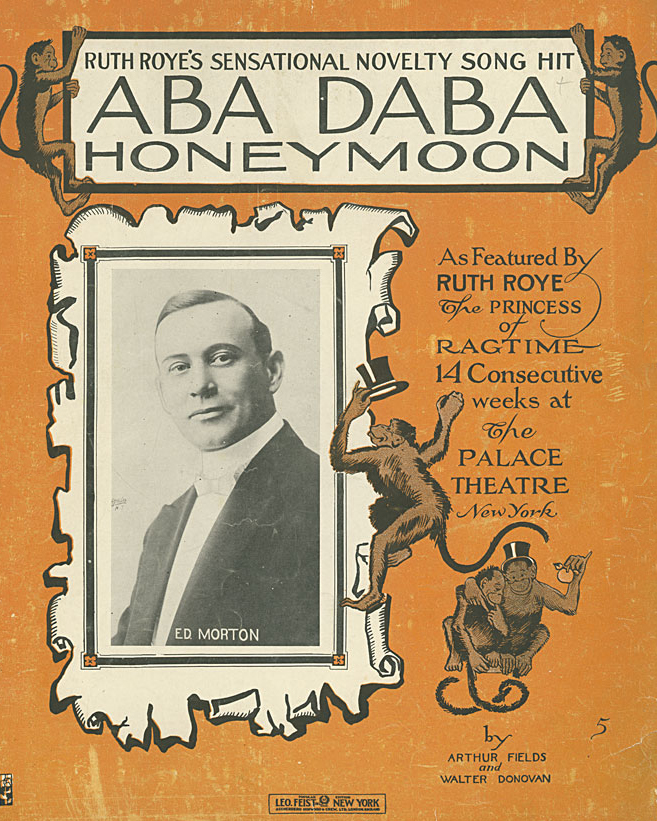
- Sheet music cover with Eddie Morton, 1914

Song
- Published: 1914
- Songwriters: Arthur Fields, Walter Donovan

"Aba Daba Honeymoon" is a show tune with lyrics by Arthur Fields and music by Walter Donovan. It was published in 1914 by Leo Feist. It is known through its chorus, "Aba daba daba daba daba daba dab, Said the chimpie to the monk; Baba daba daba daba daba daba dab, Said the monkey to the chimp." It was first performed by Ruth Roye, and first recorded in 1914 by the comic duo team of Collins & Harlan.

== Debbie Reynolds and Carleton Carpenter version ==
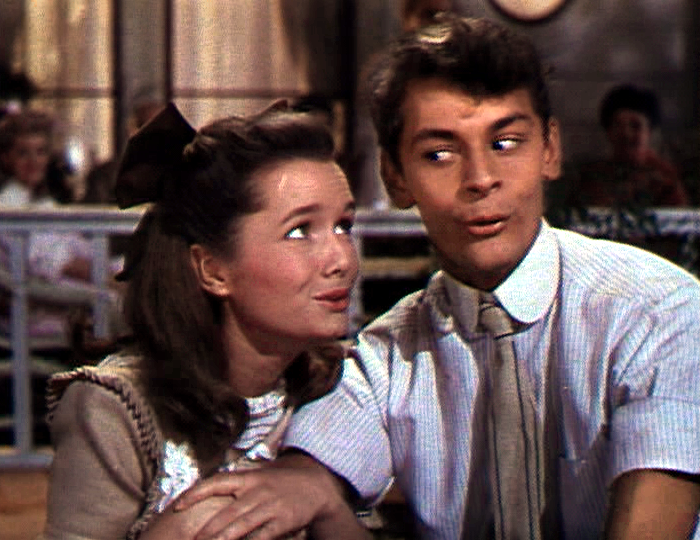
Debbie Reynolds and Carleton Carpenter performing the song in Two Weeks With Love (1950)

A version of the song "Aba Daba Honeymoon" was featured in the 1950 film, Two Weeks with Love. The single released from that film was recorded by Debbie Reynolds and Carleton Carpenter on August 4, 1950, and issued as a single by MGM Records as catalog number 30282. It reached number 3 on the Billboard charts in 1951.

M-G-M sent the pair on a multicity personal appearance tour of Loews theaters to capitalize on its success, beginning in Washington, D.C. According to Billboard in 1967, the song went on to sell 3 million copies, becoming perhaps "the first really big single come directly from a soundtrack".

== Other versions ==
- Richard Hayes and Kitty Kallen recorded the song for Mercury Records in 1951. It peaked at number 9 on the Billboard magazine chart.
- A 1951 recording of the song by Freddy Martin and His Orchestra with Merv Griffin for RCA Victor Records peaked at number 12 on the Billboard magazine chart.
- Another 1951 recording that sold well was recorded by Hoagy Carmichael and Cass Daley for Decca Records.
- "Aba Daba Honeymoon" was featured on the 1959 soundtrack to Have Rocket, Will Travel, the first feature film to star the Three Stooges after their 1959 resurgence in popularity.
- The Chenille Sisters released a version spelled Abba Dabba Honeymoon on February 1, 1994, from their 1992 children's album, The Big Picture and Other Songs for Kids.
- The chorus of the song was featured in a short sequence in the 1930 Disney film Monkey Melodies, except only the 'Aba daba daba daba daba daba da' bit is actively said.
