= Oh! Frenchy =

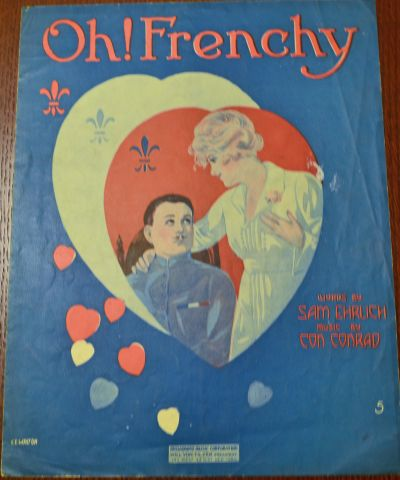
- Sheet Music cover

Song
- Language: English
- Published: 1918
- Songwriter(s): Lyricist: Sam Ehrlich; Composer: Con Conrad

"Oh! Frenchy" is a World War I song written by Sam Ehrlich and composed by Con Conrad. It was published in New York, New York by Broadway Music corporation in 1918. The song was in the top 20 charts from September 1918 to March 1919 and was number 2 in October, December, and February. The sheet music cover features a soldier pictured in uniform with a woman in his heart.
