= Shalako (disambiguation) =

Shalako may refer to:

- Shalako, an annual Native American festival
- Shalako (novel), by Louis L'Amour
- Shalako (film)
- Shalakó, another name for the pith helmet
