= Barry Kelley =

American actor (1908–1991)

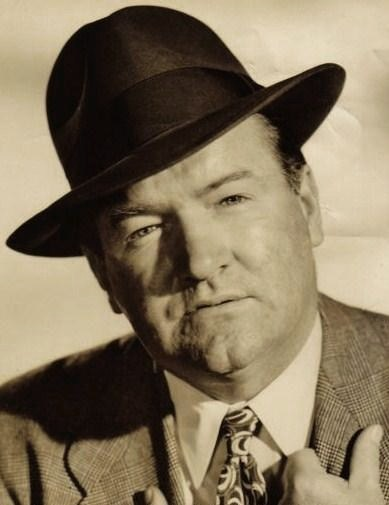
- Kelley in The Asphalt Jungle (1950)
- Born: Edward Barry Kelley; August 19, 1908; Chicago, Illinois, U.S.
- Died: June 5, 1991 (aged 82); Woodland Hills, Los Angeles, California, U.S.
- Occupation: Actor
- Years active: 1934–1969

Edward Barry Kelley (August 19, 1908 – June 5, 1991) was an American actor on Broadway in the 1930s and 1940s and in films during the 1940s, 1950s, and 1960s. The heavy-set actor created the role of Ike in Oklahoma! on Broadway. A popular figure in film noir and crime films, he appeared in over 15 such pictures. His large size and acting range had him playing shyster lawyers, judges, detectives, and police officers.

== Early years ==
The 6'4", 230-pound Kelley was born in Chicago, Illinois, and attended the Goodman School of Drama at the Art Institute of Chicago (now at DePaul University).

== Stage ==
Kelley began acting on the stage in the 1930s. His Broadway credits include Within the Gates (1934–1935), Parnell (1935–1936), Saint Joan (1936), Hamlet (1936–1937), The Wingless Victory (1936–1937), The Star-Wagon (1937–1938), Mamba's Daughters (1940), Strip for Action (1942–1943), Oklahoma! (1943–1948), Loco (1946), Wonderful Journey (1946–1947), and Portrait in Black (1947).

== Film ==
In films, Kelley often portrayed cops or judges in films, including Boomerang (his first film in 1947), Knock on Any Door, Ma and Pa Kettle, and The Asphalt Jungle. (Another source says, "His film debut was in the 1948 film noir Force of Evil.") One of his best roles (for which he received third billing) was as the good-bad half brother of Joel McCrea in The Tall Stranger (1957). Kelley had an uncredited role as a police chief in the 1964 Frank Sinatra musical Robin and the 7 Hoods.

== Television ==
Kelley worked in dozens of television series. As in the movies, he was usually cast in westerns or crime dramas. In 1954, he appeared in a TV episode of The Lone Ranger entitled Texas Draw. His first of three appearances on Have Gun-Will Travel took place in 1960, when he played the role of Sheriff Carlton.

Kelley appeared as Josh Teller on the TV western Lawman, in the episode titled "The Outsider" in 1959. He portrayed the recurring character Jim Rafferty in five episodes of the 1960–1961 situation comedy The Tom Ewell Show.

Kelley returned to Lawman in 1961, this time as Governor Johnson in the episode titled "Owny O'Reilly." Also that year, he played Mr. Slocum, the boss of insurance agent Pete Porter, in six episodes of the CBS situation comedy, Pete and Gladys (1961), starring Harry Morgan and Cara Williams; as "Danceman" in the episode "Everyman" in Have Gun - Will Travel (his second appearance on the show); and as villain Frank Williams in the Bat Masterson episode called "Ledger of Guilt."

Other western series he appeared in during this period included: Tales of Wells Fargo, Wanted: Dead or Alive, Laramie and Bronco.

Kelley guest starred three times in the western television series Bonanza between 1959 and 1965, playing different roles. In 1962, Kelley played Captain Donovan in the episode "The Parish Car" of the ABC drama series, Going My Way, starring Gene Kelly. The same year, he appeared on Have Gun - Will Travel for the third time, as Judge Bryant in the episode "Trial at Tablerock." He also appeared occasionally as Alan Young's father-in-law on the situation comedy Mister Ed from 1962 through 1966.

In 1964, Kelley played Hurley Feasel in the episode "Kate Flat on Her Back" of the CBS sitcom Petticoat Junction (credited as Barry Kelly), and as Police Commissioner Ludlow on The Munsters. He played Park Milgrave in the 1966 Perry Mason episode, "The Case of the Fanciful Frail." He portrayed a mayor on Rango in 1967, in the episode ""If You Can't Take It with You, Don't Go."

Kelley's final television role was as Sheriff Vic Crandall in three episodes of Petticoat Junction in 1967 and 1968.

== Death ==
Kelley died in 1991 at the age of 82 in Woodland Hills, California.

== Broadway roles ==
- Within the Gates (1934) as the gardener
- Parnell (1935) as first leader
- The Wingless Victory (1936) as Happy Penny
- The Star-Wagon (1937) as first thug

== Selected filmography ==
- Boomerang (1947) - Desk Sgt. Dugan (uncredited)
- Force of Evil (1948) - Det. Egan
- Knock on Any Door (1949) - Judge Drake
- The Undercover Man (1949) - Attorney Edward J. O'Rourke
- Ma and Pa Kettle (1949) - Mr. Victor Tomkins
- Mr. Belvedere Goes to College (1949) - Police Sgt. Griggs
- Too Late for Tears (1949) - Police Lt. Breach
- Johnny Stool Pigeon (1949) - William McCandles
- Red, Hot and Blue (1949) - Lt. Gorman
- Fighting Man of the Plains (1949) - Slocum
- The File on Thelma Jordon (1950) - District Attorney Melvin Pierce
- Singing Guns (1950) - Mike Murphy
- Black Hand (1950) - Police Capt. Thompson
- Wabash Avenue (1950) - Sam - Bouncer
- The Capture (1950) - Mahoney
- Love That Brute (1950) - Burly Lieutenant
- The Asphalt Jungle (1950) - Lt. Ditrich
- 711 Ocean Drive (1950) - Vince Walters
- The Killer That Stalked New York (1950) - Treasury Agent Johnson
- Right Cross (1950) - Allan Goff
- Southside 1-1000 (1950) - Bill Evans
- The Great Missouri Raid (1951) - Mr. Bauer
- Francis Goes to the Races (1951) - Roy Square Deal Mallory
- Flying Leathernecks (1951) - Brigadier General
- The Well (1951) - Sam Packard
- Carrie (1952) - Slawson
- Woman of the North Country (1952) - O'Hara
- Back at the Front (1952) - Brig. Gen. Dixon
- Law and Order (1953) - Fin Elder
- Remains to Be Seen (1953) - Lt. O'Flair
- South Sea Woman (1953) - Col. Hickman
- Vice Squad (1953) - Dwight Foreman
- Champ for a Day (1953) - Tom Healy
- The Long Wait (1954) - Tucker
- The Shanghai Story (1954) - Ricki Dolmine
- Women's Prison (1955) - Warden Brock
- New York Confidential (1955) - Robert Frawley
- Trial (1955) - Jim Brackett
- Accused of Murder (1956) - Police Capt. Art Smedley
- The Wings of Eagles (1957) - Capt. Jock Clark
- Monkey on My Back (1957) - Big Ralph
- The Joker Is Wild (1957) - Captain Hugh McCarthy
- The Tall Stranger (1957) - Hardy Bishop
- Gunfire at Indian Gap (1957) - Sheriff Daniel Harris
- Buchanan Rides Alone (1958) - Lew Agry
- The Buccaneer (1958) - Commodore Patterson
- Ice Palace (1960) - Einer Wendt
- Elmer Gantry (1960) - Police Capt. Holt
- The Police Dog Story (1961) - Officer Bert Dana
- Secret of Deep Harbor (1961) - Milo Fowler
- The Clown and the Kid (1961) - Barker
- Jack the Giant Killer (1962) - Sigurd
- The Manchurian Candidate (1962) - Secretary of Defense
- Robin and the 7 Hoods (1964) - Police Chief Oscar C. Brockton (uncredited)
- Rio Conchos (1964) - Croupier
- How to Murder Your Wife (1965) - Club Member in Steam Room
- Boy, Did I Get a Wrong Number! (1966) - 'D.G.', Movie Studio Boss (uncredited)
- The Love Bug (1968) - Police Sgt.
- The Extraordinary Seaman (1969) - Adm. Barnwell (final film role)
