= Wetherton =

Wetherton may refer to:

- Wetherton, the central character in short story "Trap of Gold" by Louis L'Amour
- Wetherton, fictional town in Yorkshire, England, setting for UK TV series Dalziel and Pascoe
- Wetherton, a fictional railway station in Worcestershire, England, featuring in 1990s UK TV series Oh, Doctor Beeching!
