= The Tall Stranger (film) =

1957 film by Thomas Carr

- Directed by: Thomas Carr
- Screenplay by: Christopher Knopf
- Based on: Louis L'Amour (from a story by)
- Produced by: Walter Mirisch
- Starring: Joel McCrea; Virginia Mayo
- Cinematography: Wilfrid M. Cline
- Edited by: William Austin
- Music by: Hans J. Salter
- Color process: Color by DeLuxe
- Production company: Walter Mirisch Productions
- Distributed by: Allied Artists Pictures
- Release date: November 17, 1957
- Running time: 83 minutes
- Country: United States
- Language: English

The Tall Stranger is a 1957 American CinemaScope Western film directed by Thomas Carr and starring Joel McCrea and Virginia Mayo. It is based on the novel of the same name by Louis L'Amour.

== Plot ==
Former Union soldier Ned Bannon is shot in his side and left for dead while returning home at the end of the Civil War. He wakes up in a wagon several days later. The wagon belongs to widow Ellen, who with her son Will, is part of a wagon train of Confederate homesteaders. The settlers are concerned that whoever shot Bannon might return to finish the job. Some, Pagones in particular, are also ill-disposed to a Yankee. When questioned Bannon tells them that just before he was shot he had spotted a small mob of cattle and some drovers. The only thing he remembers about his attacker was some fancy spurs and his gold-plated rifle.

The settlers are heading for California but Bannon tells them there is no trail past Bishop's Valley where he is headed. Mort Harper and his friend Purcell claim the trail was broken a year earlier and Bannon wouldn't know that as he has been away from the area since the war started. In private he tells Ellen that Hardy Bishop would never let anyone through his land and that he is sure that Harper's know that. He also says that Bishop is his half-brother, and he, Bannon, would be even less welcome than the settlers.

At Bishop's ranch, some of his hands return after unsuccessfully trailing some cattle rustlers. They also tell him about the approaching wagon train and that there was man in a Union officer's uniform with them. Bishop thinks the Union officer may be Bannon, who he blames for failing to prevent the execution of his son, who was a member of Quantrill's Raiders. The settlers arrive in Bishop's Valley which Harper says has plenty of land that is free for the taking. Bannon disagrees. Harper tries to convince the settlers to settle in the valley rather than heading for California. He claims the valley is government land and they can handle Bishop if he causes trouble. Bannon tells the settlers there will be a lot of widows. Harper and Purcell force Bannon to leave the settler's camp at gunpoint. He heads for Bishop's ranch.

When Bishop hears than Bannon is coming he orders his foreman, Stark, to tell the men to stay out of it. He loads his gun while Stark tries to reason with him, to no avail. When Bannon arrives, Bishop shoots at him deliberately just missing. When he is down to his last bullet instead of shooting, he starts a fist fight, which Bannon wins, giving Bishop a severe beating in the process. While he is recovering, Bishop tells Stark if Bannon doesn't leave, he will kill him. Stark says he won't, and adds that Bannon only wants to talk. Bishop tells Stark to get the men ready to run the settlers off his land. Bishop eventually talks to Bannon, who says the settlers won't go, but asks Bishop to wait while he finds out what Harper is up to. Bishop still wants to find the rustlers but Bannon doesn't think they are connected to Harper.

The settlers are working out how they will settle their part of the valley when two men claiming to be miners approach and ask for tobacco. The men are wanted criminals Zarata and Barrett. They are known to Harper and Purcell, but they don't let the settlers know this. Harper's plan is for Bishop to attack the settlers in the expectation that the settlers will kill several of Bishop's men. Zarata will wait at Bishop's ranch with a dozen men and kill whoever returns there. In return, they will get half of Bishop's cattle. Zarata says what is to prevent him and his men from taking all the cattle. Harper says it will be difficult for a known criminal to sell 5000 cattle. He says he can get at least three times the cash for selling the cattle than Zarata could get. Zarata agrees to go ahead with the original plan. He then says he thinks he recognizes Ellen from St Louis during the war, but Harper, who has designs on her, says she was in Virginia during the war.

Bannon, Stark and ranch-hands Chavez and Red approach the settlers. Zarata recognizes Bannon. He was the one who shot him earlier. Harper tells him to stay out of sight. Bannon tries to convince the settlers to leave peacefully and offers them provisions and ammunition and to lead them safely to the correct trail to California. Pagones says he's lying and so does Harper. Harper says they should trust him as he got them this far without incident, and shouldn't believe saddle tramps. Red takes offence and prepares to draw his gun. Harper goads him, but when Red pulls his gun, Bannon knocks his hand and he misses Harper who returns fire and hits Red in the stomach. A settler's wife is shot and while the settlers are distracted, Bannon tells Chavez to get Red away. The woman is dead, but when Bannon sees them turn the body over he looks puzzled. As the situation escalates Bannon and Stark leave. Harper says they need to circle the wagons before Bishop attacks.

Bannon and Stark find Chavez and Red. Red can't ride further so Bannon tells Chavez to get a buckboard while Stark stands guard. Bannon is going to talk to the settlers, he knows Bishop will attack once he knows that Red has been shot. Stark and Will says as Red's shot killed the woman the settlers can't be blamed. Bannon says that the shot that killed her wasn't from a handgun, someone else shot her, the same person that shot him. Zarata leaves the settlers camp that night and finds Ellen washing in a stream. He says she was in St Louis but she denies it. When he attacks her Bannon interrupts. He checks Zarata's rifle and realizes it is the one used to shoot him. He gives it to Ellen and confronts Zarata. When Barrett appears, Ellen shoots him and Zarata grabs Bannon's pistol. Will hears the shot and races to find his mother. Harper stops the others from following saying it could be Bishop's men. Will interrupts the fight and Zarata escapes. He gets to the settlers and tells them Bannon attacked Ellen and killed Barrett and he was alone. Harper encourages the settlers to go after Bannon. Bannon, Ellen and Will get away before the settlers arrive but Ellen drops Zarata's rifle which Harper retrieves.

Bannon heads to Bishop's ranch. He eventually, with a little help from Will, convinces him to let Bannon try and get the settlers to hand over Harper. If that fails, then Bishop can try his way, but it's the settlers and the rustlers he will be facing. Later that night the ranch is attacked. Several men in the bunkhouse are killed and the rest trapped. Bannon leaves Ellen and Will in the house with Charley and joins Bishop in the barn. They fill a wagon with wet straw, set it on fire and push it towards the bunkhouse. The smoke allows the ranch hands to escape and there is a shoot out with the rustlers. Zarata gets into the barn and tries to ride out. He is cornered by Bishop, but he is out of bullets. Zarata shoots him, but Bishop drags him off his horse and strangles him. Harper gets into the house and shoots Charley. Bannon enters and Harper holds Ellen hostage, forcing Bannon to drop his gun. Bannon thinks Harper is bluffing with an empty gun, and he is correct. When Harper tries for another gun, Bannon shoots him. Bannon manages to talk to Bishop before he dies.

As the settlers are about to leave for California, Bannon arrives and asks them to stay in the valley, which they do. Ellen and Will have already left, but Bannon catches up.

== Cast ==
- Joel McCrea as Ned Bannon
- Virginia Mayo as Ellen
- Barry Kelley as Hardy Bishop
- Michael Pate as Charley
- Michael Ansara as Zarata
- Leo Gordon as Stark
- Whit Bissell as Adam Judson
- Ray Teal as Cap
- James Dobson as Dud
- Phil Phillips as Will (as Philip Phillips)
- George N. Neise as Mort Harper (as George Neise)
- Robert Foulk as Pagones
- Adam Kennedy as Red
- Jennifer Lea as Mary (as Jenifer Lea)

== Bibliography ==
- Pitts, Michael R. Western Movies: A Guide to 5,105 Feature Films. McFarland, 2012.
