= Duke York =

American actor (1908–52)

- Duke York, mid-1940s
- Born: Charles Everest Sinsabaugh; October 17, 1908; Danby, New York, U.S.
- Died: January 24, 1952 (aged 43); Hollywood, California, U.S.
- Other name: Duke Owl
- Years active: 1932–1952
- Spouse: Frances Miles (m. 1930; div. 1941)
- Partner: Catherine Moench

Duke York (né Charles Everest Sinsabaugh; October 17, 1908 – January 24, 1952), was an American film actor and stuntman who appeared in nearly 160 films between 1932 and 1952. He was also known as Duke Owl.

== Early years ==
The son of Mr. and Mrs. Floyd Sinsabaugh, York was born in Danby, New York.

== Career ==
Modern viewers will remember York for his portrayals of grotesque monsters, ape men, or other scary goon-like characters in Three Stooges short films such as Three Little Twirps, Idle Roomers, Three Pests in a Mess, Shivering Sherlocks, and Who Done It? His most prominent non-monster role was as Kelly in Higher Than a Kite. York also played the role of King Kala in the serial Flash Gordon.

In the 1930s, York worked as a combination lifeguard and bodyguard for actress Ida Lupino.

== Personal life and death ==
In the 1930s, York married movie stuntwoman Frances Miles, but the union ended in divorce in 1941. Several years later, York was dating Catherine Moench, a resident of Beverly Hills. They planned to marry, but she called it off, saying that he was "quite jealous and had misunderstood various actions" of hers in the past. York eventually admitted to Moench that he was wrong, and wanted to get back together, but she refused.

On January 24, 1952, during a three-hour phone call to Moench, York threatened suicide several times stating he could not live without her. He then shot himself in the head while on the phone with Moench. His body was discovered by friend and fellow actor George Cleveland.

== Selected filmography ==
York plays a docile wolfman who goes berserk whenever he hears music in The Three Stooges film Idle Roomers (1944).

- Brothers (1930) - Cafe Customer (uncredited)
- Island of Lost Souls (1932) - Beast (uncredited)
- Murders in the Zoo (1933) - Seaman (uncredited)
- I Love That Man (1933) - Label's Henchman (uncredited)
- Footlight Parade (1933) - Sailor on Table in 'Shanghai Lil' (uncredited)
- I'm No Angel (1933) - Sideshow Spectator (uncredited)
- Roman Scandals (1933) - Valerius' Soldier (uncredited)
- No More Women (1934) - Hawk Crew Member (uncredited)
- Upper World (1934) - Marine in Burlesque Theatre (uncredited)
- Sing and Like It (1934) - Mug in Pool Hall (uncredited)
- The Old Fashioned Way (1934) - Stagehand on Bar Set (uncredited)
- Elmer and Elsie (1934) - Smith
- The Pursuit of Happiness (1934) - Jonathan
- Ready for Love (1934) - John Alden at Basket Social (uncredited)
- One Hour Late (1934) - Mixer (uncredited)
- Wings in the Dark (1935) - Reporter - Last Flight (uncredited)
- Car 99 (1935) - Cop (uncredited)
- Stolen Harmony (1935) - Duke (uncredited)
- Strangers All (1935) - Sig Ruman - Protester at Meeting / Courtroom Witness (uncredited)
- So Red the Rose (1935) - Soldier (uncredited)
- Two for Tonight (1935) - Cop in Cafe (uncredited)
- Redheads on Parade (1935) - Projectionist (uncredited)
- Here Comes Cookie (1935) - Milkman (uncredited)
- His Family Tree (1935) - Henchman with Frank (uncredited)
- It's a Great Life (1935) - Driver (uncredited)
- Coronado (1935) - Marine (uncredited)
- The Garden Murder Case (1936) - Traffic Cop (uncredited)
- Strike Me Pink (1936) - Smiley
- Flash Gordon (1936, Serial) - King Kala [Chs. 2-5]
- Ticket to Paradise (1936) - Milkman
- Rhythm on the Range (1936) - Police Officer (uncredited)
- Crash Donovan (1936) - Patrolman (uncredited)
- Sworn Enemy (1936) - Al - a Gangster (uncredited)
- The Three Mesquiteers (1936) - Chuck (one-armed vet)
- Libeled Lady (1936) - Cab Driver (uncredited)
- Love on the Run (1936) - Paul - Baron's Chauffeur (uncredited)
- Mind Your Own Business (1936) - Cruger's Henchman
- Dangerous Number (1937) - Policeman (uncredited)
- They Gave Him a Gun (1937) - Sourpuss Soldier (uncredited)
- Dangerous Holiday (1937) - Gollenger's Chauffeur (uncredited)
- Midnight Madonna (1937) - (uncredited)
- SOS Coast Guard (1937, Serial) - Sea Heavy #1 (uncredited)
- Partners in Crime (1937) - Cab Driver (uncredited)
- Man-Proof (1938) - Referee (uncredited)
- A Slight Case of Murder (1938) - Champ
- Reckless Living (1938) - Poker Player (uncredited)
- Wide Open Faces (1938) - Joe, a Gangster (uncredited)
- The Fighting Devil Dogs (1938, Serial) - Sam (uncredited)
- The Marines Are Here (1938) - Native (uncredited)
- Professor Beware (1938) - Handshaker - Paint-Brush Gag (uncredited)
- Sing You Sinners (1938) - Cab Driver (uncredited)
- Dick Tracy Returns (1938, Serial) - Jack (uncredited)
- The Spider's Web (1938, Serial) - Henchman (uncredited)
- Gang Bullets (1938) - Collins (uncredited)
- Topper Takes a Trip (1938) - Second Bailiff (uncredited)
- Navy Secrets (1939) - Babe - Henchman
- You Can't Cheat an Honest Man (1939) - Minor Role (uncredited)
- Street of Missing Men (1939) - Butch - One of Darwin's Henchmen (uncredited)
- Union Pacific (1939) - Railwayman (uncredited)
- Those High Grey Walls (1939) - Guard (uncredited)
- Destry Rides Again (1939) - Townsman (uncredited)
- Mercy Plane (1939) - Joe
- Terry and the Pirates (1940, Serial) - Leopard Man (uncredited)
- Nutty But Nice (1940, Short) - Butch - Kidnapper (uncredited)
- When the Daltons Rode (1940) - Townsman (uncredited)
- How High Is Up? (1940, Short) - Workman (uncredited)
- The Secret Seven (1940) - Karpa (uncredited)
- Sky Murder (1940) - Enforcer at Cell Block Meeting (uncredited)
- The Green Archer (1940, Serial) - Martel - aka Harry Madison (uncredited)
- Little Men (1940) - Poker Player (uncredited)
- Trail of the Vigilantes (1940) - Deputy Sheriff (uncredited)
- Back Street (1941) - Minor Role (uncredited)
- Meet the Chump (1941) - Mug (uncredited)
- A Man Betrayed (1941) - Doorman at Club Inferno (uncredited)
- Topper Returns (1941) - Engine Room Sailor-Henchman in Black (uncredited)
- Broadway Limited (1941) - Relief Train Engineer (uncredited)
- Tight Shoes (1941) - (uncredited)
- Hello, Sucker (1941) - Minor Role (uncredited)
- Dr. Kildare's Wedding Day (1941) - Joe - Piano Mover (uncredited)
- No Greater Sin (1941) - Scaturo's Henchman (uncredited)
- Mob Town (1941) - Burly Man (uncredited)
- Burma Convoy (1941) - Bartender (uncredited)
- Texas (1941) - Wise Guy (uncredited)
- Never Give a Sucker an Even Break (1941) - Tough Guy (uncredited)
- Sea Raiders (1941, Serial) - Pete - Whaler Crewman [Chs. 8-9] (uncredited)
- Public Enemies (1941) - Holmes
- Shadow of the Thin Man (1941) - Valentine - Doorman at Mario's Grotto (uncredited)
- Some More of Samoa (1941, Short) - Kingfisher (uncredited)
- Bedtime Story (1941) - Phil, Hotel Bouncer (uncredited)
- Nazi Agent (1942) - Sailor (uncredited)
- Jail House Blues (1942) - Minor Role (uncredited)
- Woman of the Year (1942) - Football Player (uncredited)
- Two Yanks in Trinidad (1942) - MP Corporal (uncredited)
- Alias Boston Blackie (1942) - Johnson - Policeman in Squad Car 29 (uncredited)
- Kid Glove Killer (1942) - Card-Playing Henchman (uncredited)
- Saboteur (1942) - Deputy Sheriff (uncredited)
- The Spoilers (1942) - Miner (uncredited)
- Sunday Punch (1942) - Boxer (uncredited)
- Maisie Gets Her Man (1942) - Stagehand at Second Theater (uncredited)
- Jackass Mail (1942) - Rancher Seeing Baggot with Roan Horse (uncredited)
- Invisible Agent (1942) - German Sentry (uncredited)
- Give Out, Sisters (1942) - Louie
- Panama Hattie (1942) - Bruno (uncredited)
- Who Done It? (1942) - Attendant with the Coroner (uncredited)
- Behind the Eight Ball (1942) - First Thug (uncredited)
- Arabian Nights (1942) - Archer (uncredited)
- Stand by for Action (1942) - Sailor (uncredited)
- Assignment in Brittany (1943) - German Private (uncredited)
- Three Little Twirps (1943, Short) - Sultan of Abadabba (uncredited)
- Higher Than a Kite (1943, Short) - Kelly (uncredited)
- Thank Your Lucky Stars (1943) - Wooden Indian (uncredited)
- Crazy House (1943) - Dead End Character (uncredited)
- Idle Roomers (1943, Short) - Lupe the Wolf Man
- Destination Tokyo (1943) - Duke - 'Copperfin' Crewman (uncredited)
- Hi, Good Lookin'! (1944) - Boris - the Mad Tenor (uncredited)
- Follow the Boys (1944) - Military Policeman (uncredited)
- The Contender (1944) - 'Bomber' Brown
- Johnny Doesn't Live Here Anymore (1944) - Cab Driver (uncredited)
- An American Romance (1944) - Steel Mill Worker with Eddie (uncredited)
- Lost in a Harem (1944) - Jailer / Clerk (uncredited)
- Three Pests in a Mess - Joe (Man in Skeleton costume) (uncredited)
- The Story of Kenneth W. Randall, M.D. (1946) - Sam Gregg
- Road to Rio (1947) - Roustabout (uncredited)
- Shivering Sherlocks (1948, Short) - Angel
- California Firebrand (1948) - Chad Mason
- A Southern Yankee (1948) - Confederate Guard (uncredited)
- That Lady in Ermine (1948) - Sergeant (uncredited)
- Isn't It Romantic? (1948) - Townsman (uncredited)
- The Paleface (1948) - Terris' Henchman (uncredited)
- Who Done It? (1949, Short) - Nikko
- Johnny Stool Pigeon (1949) - Bodyguard (uncredited)
- Stampede (1949) - Maxie
- Mississippi Rhythm (1949)
- Francis (1950) - Sgt. Poor, G2 (uncredited)
- Fortunes of Captain Blood (1950) - Andrew Hardy
- The Gunfighter (1950) - Pete's Pal (uncredited)
- Winchester '73 (1950) - Man #1 (uncredited)
- Where Danger Lives (1950) - Postville Cowboy (uncredited)
- Snow Dog (1950) - Henchman Duprez
- Hit Parade of 1951 (1950) - Cal
- Let's Dance (1950) - Waiter (uncredited)
- Call of the Klondike (1950) - Luke
- Rogue River (1951) - Bowers
- Oh! Susanna (1951) - Trooper (uncredited)
- Texans Never Cry (1951) - Counterfeiter Baker (uncredited)
- Fighting Coast Guard (1951) - Riveter (uncredited)
- Snake River Desperadoes (1951) - Street Brawler (uncredited)
- Silver Canyon (1951) - Recruiting Sergeant (uncredited)
- Mask of the Avenger (1951) - Loafer (uncredited)
- Fort Worth (1951) - Gunman - Castro's Henchman (uncredited)
- The Red Badge of Courage (1951) - Veteran (uncredited)
- Fort Defiance (1951) - Joe Doniger, Soldier (uncredited)
- Golden Girl (1951) - Quincy Miner in Audience (uncredited)
- Valley of Fire (1951) - Piano (uncredited)
- Northwest Territory (1951) - Dawson
- My Favorite Spy (1951) - Man (uncredited)
- Night Stage to Galveston (1952) - Patrolman in Handcuffs (uncredited)
- Carbine Williams (1952) - Guard (uncredited)
- Confidence Girl (1952) - Nightclub Accomplice with Binoculars (uncredited)
- Barbed Wire (1952) - Buttons (uncredited)
- Trail Blazers (1953) - Angus (final film role)
- Of Cash and Hash (1955, Short) - Angel (uncredited, archive footage)
- For Crimin' Out Loud (1956, Short) - Nikko (uncredited, archive footage)
