= The Walking Drum =

1985 novel by Louis L'Amour

- First edition cover - pre publication copy
- Author: Louis L'Amour
- Language: English
- Genre: Historical novel
- Publisher: Bantam Books
- Publication date: 1 May 1984
- Publication place: United States
- Media type: Print (Paperback)
- Pages: 468 pp (first edition, hardback)
- ISBN: 0-553-27013-3 (first edition, hardback)

The Walking Drum is a novel by the American author Louis L'Amour. Unlike most of his other novels, The Walking Drum is not set in the frontier era of the American West, but rather is an historical novel set in the Middle Ages—12th-century Europe and West Asia.

== Plot summary ==
Fleeing his birthplace in Brittany to escape the Baron de Tournemine, who killed his mother, and to seek his lost father, Mathurin Kerbouchard looks for passage on a ship. Although forced to initially serve as a galley slave, he eventually becomes a pilot and frees captured Moorish girl Aziza, her companion, and his fellow slaves. With their help, he sells his captors into slavery and escapes to Cádiz in Moorish Spain.

Hearing that his father is dead, Mathurin goes inland and poses as a scholar in Córdoba, but his scholarship is interrupted when he becomes involved in political intrigue surrounding Aziza and is imprisoned by Prince Ahmed. Scheduled to be executed, Mathurin escapes to the hills outside the city. Before he leaves, soldiers burn the place where he is staying, leaving him for dead. Mathurin returns to Córdoba and, aided by a woman he meets named Safia, he takes a job as a translator. However, the intrigue in which Safia is involved threatens their lives, and they must flee the city. Safia, through her own connections, gathers news of Mathurin's father, and learns that he may be alive but was sold as a slave in the east.

Leaving Spain, Safia and Mathurin take up with a merchant caravan and travel across Europe, stopping along the way at places to trade or to fight off thieves. Reaching Brittany, the caravan tempts a raid from de Tournemine. However, they are ready for his attack and, routing his forces, press on, joined by another caravan, to sack the baron's castle. Mathurin kills the baron and, leaving the caravan, later throws de Tournamine's body into a swamp rumored to be a gate to Purgatory.

Riding eastward, Mathurin befriends a group of oppressed peasants before rejoining the caravan as it approaches Paris. Safia has learned that Mathurin's father is at Alamut, the fortress of the Old Man of the Mountain. She leaves the caravan and remains in Paris, but Mathurin goes on to seek his father. Both caravans will travel eastward and cross the Russian steppes together.

In Paris, Mathurin talks with a group of students but offends a teacher and must flee again for his life. He chances upon the fleeing Comtesse de Malcrais, Suzanne, whom he assists in escaping from Count Robert. They meet up with the caravans again at Provins and are joined by a company of acrobats (including Khatib) and additional caravans from Italy, Armenia, the Baltic, Venice, and the Netherlands. The caravans join and travel to Kiev to trade goods for furs. Denied passage down the Dnieper by boat, the caravans head southward from Kiev. Crossing the Southern Bug and approaching the Chicheklaya, they encounter hostile Pechenegs. Stalling for time as the caravan drives south toward the Black Sea, Kerbouchard exchanges pleasantries with the Khan, fights a duel with Prince Yury, and receives a drink. However, as he leaves the camp, the Khan says that the Petchenegs will attack the caravan in the morning.

Kerbouchard returns to the caravan, which is approaching the Black Sea, and assists as they contrive rudimentary fortifications, hoping to hold their ground against the Petchenegs until boats arrive to take them to Constantinople. A battle ensues, by the end of which most of the caravan merchants are killed, but Suzanne may have escaped in a small boat, and Mathurin, wounded, hides in the brush and nurses himself back to health, surviving to reclaim his horse, and ride to Byzantium, clothed in rags.

Casting out storyteller Abdullah and taking his place in the market in Constantinople, Mathurin makes some money and an enemy named Bardas. Leaving the market with someone named Phillip, he buys new clothes. In a wine shop, he meets Andronicus Comnenus and captures his interest. Perceiving that rare books are valuable in the city, Mathurin then takes to copying from memory books that he copied in Córdoba. Contacting Safia's informant, he learns that his father is indeed at Alamut, but that he attempted to escape and may be dead. Nevertheless, he is determined to search for him. Going to an armorer who maintains a room for exercising with weapons, he meets some of the Emperor's guard and drops hints to one of them of the books he is copying, so that the emperor will hear of him. Invited to meet the emperor, Mathurin offers him advice and a book and mentions his desire to rescue his father from Alamut.

Two weeks later, the emperor supplies Mathurin with a sword, three horses he lost when the caravan was taken, and gold. Meanwhile, Suzanne has returned to her castle and strengthened its defenses with survivors from the caravan. At a dinner with Andronicus, Bardas makes trouble, and Mathurin and Phillip must leave. However, Mathurin has a vision and foretells Andronicus' death. Mathurin advises Phillip to leave the city and go to Saône, and he himself receives a warning note from Safia, telling him not to go to Alamut.

Leaving Constantinople, Mathurin travels by boat across the Black Sea to Trebizond and adopts the identity of ibn-Ibrahim, a Muslim physician, scholar and alchemist. At Tabriz, he finds Khatib, who mentions rumors that his father is being treated terribly by al-Zawila, a powerful newcomer to Alamut. Invited to visit the Emir Ma'sud Kahn, Mathurin presents a picture of himself in his identity as ibn-Ibrahim, and, learning that ibn-Haram is in the city, decides to pass on from Tabriz toward Jundi Shapur, the medical school that provides his pretense for travelling through the area.

Leaving Tabriz, Mathurin and Khatib travel alongside a caravan as far as Qazvin, where ibn-Ibrahim receives gifts and an invitation to visit Alamut. Before he leaves for Alamut, Mathurin meets princess Sundari, from Anhilwara, and, after learning that she is being forced to marry a friend of the king of Kannauj, promises to come to Hind and rescue her from this fate if he escapes Alamut alive .

Traveling with Khatib to a valley outside Alamut, where they arrange to meet again afterward, Mathurin packs rope, nitre crystals, and other ingredients from a Chinese recipe he saw in a book in Córdoba, and gathers medicinal herbs, before riding up to the gates of Alamut. There, he is taken captive and brought before Mahmoud, who reveals that he ran into trouble with Prince Ahmed, and that the prince and Aziza are both dead. According to Mahmoud, Sinan does not know that Mathurin has been brought to Alamut.

Locked in his quarters, Kerbouchard finds that the rope was removed from his pack. Unable to escape, he speaks out his window to a guard, hoping that Sinan's spies will report his presence, and that Sinan will want to meet with an alchemist and physician such as himself. The next morning, after mixing saltpeter, charcoal, and sulfur from his saddlebags, repacking the resulting powder, and mixing preparations from the herbs, he is confronted by Mahmoud and provokes him. Brought before Sinan, Mathurin reveals some of the details of his past that Mahmoud had kept secret and broaches the subject of alchemy, hoping to be kept around longer. Promising to see him later, Sinan sends him back to his quarters and also sends a copy of a book he requested of Ma'sud Kahn in Tabriz.

Mathurin does get to see Sinan for most of a day, performing alchemy experiments and exchanging ideas. Afterward, Mahmoud approaches with guards and escorts him (along with his bags, which contains his surgery equipment) to a surgical room, saying that he was brought to Alamut on an errand of mercy to save a slave's life, by making him a eunuch. The slave is his father. Pretending to cooperate, Mathurin cuts his father's bonds and fights the guards. When more soldiers, presumably those of Sinan, arrive, Mathurin and his father escape through an aqueduct into the hidden valley.

In the garden, Mathurin packs his powder into pipes there, plugs the ends, and fashions wicks from fat-soaked string, and they hide until the middle of the next day. Meeting a young girl in the rain, Mathurin trusts her with the gist of his situation and asks if there is any way out. She mentions a gate whereby the gardener, closely guarded, takes out the leaves he rakes up. Eager to escape, she agrees to meet them near the gate. Soldiers searching the garden pass by their hiding place, and that evening they rush the gate and, assisted by nearby slaves, slay the guards, but the gate is closed on them. Placing his pipe bombs, Mathurin lights the fuses. With the gate destroyed and the soldiers stunned by his blast, they escape out and down the side of the mountain. Slaying another dozen soldiers, Mathurin, his father and the girl meet Khatib with the horses and ride off.

Reaching the city where Khatib had been hiding, they are confronted by Mahmoud and more soldiers. Mathurin fights a duel with Mahmoud and kills him.

The girl from the valley, whose home was near the gulf, rides toward Basra with Mathurin's father, who will seek the sea again. Mathurin rides toward Hind, to fulfill his promise to Sundari.

== Characters ==
- Mathurin Kerbouchard – main character
- Jean Kerbouchard – also known as Kerbouchard the Corsair; Mathurin's father
- Baron de Tournemine – a local enemy in Brittany
- Taillefeur – lieutenant of the Baron de Tournemine; previously sailed with Jean Kerbouchard
- Walther – captain of the ship that takes Kerbouchard south to Spain
- Cervon – a Gaul; member of Walther's crew
- Eric of Finnveden – a member of Walther's crew
- Red Mark – rowing slave; companion of Mathurin on the trip south to Spain
- Selim – Moorish rowing slave on the trip south to Spain
- Aziza – wealthy Moorish girl captured from a merchant ship off the Spanish coast
- Count Redwan – Aziza's Norman companion
- Hisham ibn-Bashar – important Moor in Málaga, a friend of Redwan
- ibn-Haram – military commander in Spain; enemy of Redwan and Aziza, supporter of Yusuf.
- Duban – soldier in the service of Prince Ahmed; Mathurin first meets him in Málaga
- Abu-Abdallah – a friend of Caliph Yusuf
- Shir Ali – beggar in Cádiz who poses as a merchant
- Ben Salom – Jewish merchant in Cádiz who buys Walther's ship and cargo
- Abaka Khan – Mongol Mathurin befriends in Cádiz
- John of Seville – famous scholar and translator whose life Mathurin saves on the road to Córdoba
- Hassan – John's Bedouin travelling companion
- ibn-Tuwais – Mathurin's host in Córdoba
- Valaba – woman of influence in Córdoba, whom Mathurin meets in a coffee house
- Sharasa – A girl from a valley whom Mathurin meets after escaping imprisonment
- ibn-Rushd – also known as Averroës, noted scholar of Valaba's acquaintance
- Mahmoud al-Zawila – Berber friend Mathurin makes in Córdoba; later, Sinan's right hand
- Haroun el-Zegri – friend of Mahmoud and later of Mathurin
- Prince Ahmed – Almoravid to whom Aziza is to be wedded, to cement an alliance with William of Sicily
- Akim, his daughter Sharasa, nephew Alan, and son Aric – Mathurin's Visigoth hosts in the hills east of Córdoba
- Safia – woman who helps Mathurin upon his return to Córdoba
- Khatib – acrobat from Córdoba
- Ya'kub – eldest and favourite son of Yusuf
- Ayesha – horse given to Mathurin by Safia
- Rupert von Gilderstern – Hansgraf (leader) of the merchant caravan
- Other caravan members: Lucca (from Lombardy), Johannes (an orphan from Bruges), Guido (from Piedmont)
- Peter von Gilderstern – Rupert's brother, leader of the second caravan
- Jacques, Paul – two of the peasants Mathurin assists
- Julot – student Mathurin meets in Paris
- Comtesse (Suzanne) de Malcrais – woman Mathurin and Julot meet near Paris, holder of the crusader castle Saône
- Persigny – man who helps Mathurin and the Comtesse escape
- Count Robert – man who wants to marry the Comtesse and becomes an enemy of Kerbouchard
- Lolyngton – chief of the acrobats and performers who join the caravans at Provins
- Yuri Olgevichi – a prince in Kiev, with some connections in the surrounding area
- Flandrin, Sarzeau, Grossefeldt – leaders of some of the other caravans
- Abdullah – story teller in Constantinople
- Bardas – friend of Andronicus Comnenus
- Andronicus Comnenus – cousin of Emperor Manuel I
- Manuel I – Byzantine ruler in Constantinople
- Phillip – son of a Macedonian mercenary; Mathurin meets him in Constantinople
- Ordric – Viking guard of Emperor Manuel I; he practices with Mathurin
- Mas'ud Khan – an emir in Tabriz and a spy for Sinan
- Rashid Ad-din Sinan – the Old Man of the Mountain at Alamut
- Sundari Devi – half Rajput, half Persian princess from Anhilwara, whom Mathurin meets in Qazvin
- Rachendra – Rajput guard of Sundari Devi
- Abdul – gate guard at Alamut
- Zubadiyah – girl in the Valley of the Assassins

== Analysis ==
The protagonist is Mathurin Kerbouchard of Brittany. In the course of the story he travels from place to place, ultimately in search of his disappeared father. Along the way, he finds himself in the roles of slave, pirate, scholar, physician, merchant, alchemist, and yet always a lover. Kerbouchard is a romantic seeker of knowledge and fortune on a challenging journey, full of danger, excitement, adventure, and revenge.

Along his long journey the main character is thrust into the heart of the treacheries, passions, violence and dazzling wonders of a magnificent time. From castle to slave galley, from sword-wracked battlefields to a princess's secret chamber, and ultimately, to the impregnable fortress of the Valley of the Assassins in the heart of Persia.

The book is named for a merchant caravan's marching drum, first described in chapter 36: "We often sang as we marched, and there was always the sound of the walking drum, a sound I shall hear all my life, so deeply is it embedded in the fibers of my being..." The book is filled throughout with this theme of travel to faraway lands, as epitomized by the marching of merchant caravans of the time.

== Planned sequels ==
Following the end of the novel, Louis L'Amour wrote in the section titled "Author's Note", "I am planning to continue Kerbouchard's tale in at least two more adventures during the next few years, the first of which will follow Kerbouchard to Hind (India) in search of Sundari." This sequel was to be titled A Woman Worth Having. Book Three of the series was to be set in China. Despite L'Amour's stated desire, neither continuation of this novel was ever published, presumably due to his declining health, which eventually led to his death four years later, in 1988.

== Release details ==
- 1985, US, Bantam Books (ISBN 0-553-27013-3), hardback (First edition)
- 1985, US, Bantam Books (ISBN 0-553-17194-1), paperback
- 1999, US, Bantam Books (ISBN 0-553-28040-6), paperback
- 1984, US, Bantam Books (ISBN 978-0-553-05052-3), hardback

== See also ==
- Last of the Breed, one of the author's other novels outside the western genre.
