= List of Ismaili titles =

List of titles used by the followers of Ismailism, a branch of Shia Islam.

The titles are of Persian and Arabic origin.

== Nizari Ismaili titles ==
=== Alamut period ===
The hierarchy (hudūd) of the organization of the Nizari Ismailis of the Alamut period was as follows:

- Imām (امام), the descendants of Nizar
- Dā'ī ad-Du'āt (داعی الدعات literally "Da'i of the Da'is"), "Chief Da'i"
- Dā'ī kabīr (داعی کبیر) – "Superior Da'i", "Great Da'i"
- Dā'ī (داعی, literally "missionary") – "Ordinary Da'i", "Da'i"
- Rafīq (رفیق, literally "companion, assistance, fellow-traveler"), plural rafīqān (رفیقان)
- Lāṣiq (لاصق, literally "adherent"). Lasiqs had to swear a special oath of obedience to the Imam.
- Fidā'ī (فدائی, literally "self-sacrificer")

Imam and da'is were the elites, while the majority of the sect consisted of the last three grades who were peasants and artisans.

Other titles include:

The titles Bābā (بابا; Persian equivalent of the Arabic Shaykh, "Old Man") and Sayyidinā (Sayyidnā) (سیدنا; literally "Our Lord" or "Our Master") was used by the Nizaris to refer to Hassan-i Sabbah.

- Shaykh al-Jabal or the Old Man of the Mountain
- Kiyā (کیا) – a ruler or commander. Notably held by Buzurg-Ummid.
- Muhtasham (محتشم) – a governor of Quhistan.
- Mahdī - the rightly guided one
- Qāim - the one who rises
- Nāṭiq (ناطق) - the messenger-prophet
- Waṣī (وصي) - the prophet's "legatee"
- Bāb - literally "gate"
- Hujjah - literally "proof"

=== Other periods ===
- Dā'ī al-Balagh - regional missionary
- Dā'ī al-Mutlaq - absolute missionary
- Mādhun - assistant
- Mukāsir - debater
- Shaykh - elder in Arabic
- Pīr - senior elder in Persian
- Mukhi - headman
- Kāmādia - treasurer
- Vāras/Vizier - minister
- Aāmilsaheb - agent
- Shāhzāda - prince
- Allāma - scholar
- Mu'allim - teacher
- Mullāh - lesser elder in Persian
- President - national leadership title
- Amīr - commander
- Amīr al-mu'minīn - commander of the faithful
- Begum - noble lady
- Māta Salāmat - Mother of Peace
- Sayyid - descendant
- Hakīm - doctor
- Khwājah - master
- Mawlānā - our master
- Murshid - guide-master
- Wali - guardian
- Qādī - judge
- Murīd - follower
- Mustajib - respondent
- Hājī - pilgrim
- Khalif - deputy
- Sitt - noble lady

== Other titles ==
- Aga Khan
