= Yondering =

1980 collection of short stories by Louis L'Amour

- First edition
- Author: Louis L'Amour
- Language: English
- Genre: Fiction
- Published: Bantam Books
- Publication place: United States
- Media type: Book (short story compilation)
- Pages: 177 (1980 edition), 200 (revised 1989 edition)
- ISBN: 0-553-13829-4 (1980 edition), 0-553-282203-4 (revised 1989 edition)

Yondering is a collection of short stories by American author Louis L'Amour, published in 1980. A departure from L'Amour's traditional subject matter of the Old West, Yondering contains a mix of adventure stories and character studies, primarily set in the first half of the 20th century. Two of them are set during the World War II era, with many of the stories drawing upon the author's own life experiences. The book's publication celebrated the milestone of L'Amour having an estimated 100 million books in print at that time of publication.

A limited leather-bound hardcover edition was available direct from Bantam Books at the time of the first paperback publication in 1980.

The book was revised in 1989, with the primary difference the inclusion of some of L'Amour's previously unpublished short stories in a similar vein; "Ruins of El Walarieh," "And Proudly Die," Show Me The Way Home," and "So You Want Adventure." Excised was a "The Moon of the Trees Broken by Snow: A Christmas Story" which, according to the author's son Beau L'Amour, "never really belonged in this book."

== List of Stories in the Original Edition, June 1980 ==
- Where There's Fighting
- The Dancing Kate
- Glorious! Glorious!
- Dead-End Drift
- Old Doc Yak
- Survival
- Thicker Than Blood
- The Admiral
- Shanghai, Not Without Gestures
- The Man Who Stole Shakespeare
- A Friend of the General
- Author's Tea
- A Moon of the Trees Broken By Snow: A Christmas Story
- Let Me Forget ... (poem)

== List of Stories in the Revised Edition, November 1989 ==
- Where There's Fighting
- The Dancing Kate
- By the Ruins of El Walarieh
- Glorious! Glorious!
- Dead-End Drift
- Old Doc Yak
- Survival
- And Proudly Die
- Show Me the Way to Go Home
- Thicker Than Blood
- The Admiral
- Shanghai, Not Without Gestures
- The Man Who Stole Shakespeare
- A Friend of the General
- Author's Tea
- So You Want Adventure, Do You?
- Let Me Forget ... (poem)

== Audio adaptations ==
Three stories from Yondering have been released on audio cassette from Bantam Audio.

- Dead End Drift -read by Richard Crenna with an introduction by Louis L'Amour, 1987
- Old Doc Yak -read by Richard Crenna with an introduction by Louis L'Amour, 1987
- Survival -read by Richard Crenna with an introduction by Louis L'Amour, 1987
