= Chick Bowdrie =

Fictional character

Chick Bowdrie is a character depicted in numerous Western short stories authored by writer Louis L'Amour.

== Character and novels ==
Bowdrie is portrayed as a hardened Texas Ranger, with a reputation as being good with a gun, and who is feared and respected by outlaws and lawmen alike. He is described by L'Amour as a man who could have easily ridden as an outlaw or gunfighter, but was instead recruited by the Rangers, who preferred having him on their side rather than against them. He is smart, and an expert at tracking, and speaks German, French, Comanche, some Spanish and English. The two novels in which L'Amour uses Bowdrie as his central character include: Bowdrie, with 8 short stories: Bowdrie Rides A Coyote Trail, A Job For A Ranger, Bowdrie Follows A Cold Trail, Bowdrie Passes Through, A Trail To The West, More Brains Than Bullets, Too Tough To Brand, The Killer From The Pecos; the second novel Bowdrie's Law, includes 10 short stories: McNelly Knows A Ranger, Where Buzzards Fly, Case Closed-No Prisoners, Down Sonora Way, The Road To Casa Piedras, A Ranger Rides To Town, South Of Deadwood, The Outlaws Of Poplar Creek, Rain On The Mountain Fork, and Strange Pursuit.

== Early childhood and background ==
Charles Bowdrie was born around the area of D'hanis, Texas sometime between the years of 1861 and 1863. His facial features often lead people to assume that he is of Native American heritage. This is not true however, Bowdrie was raised by a Comanche tribe from the time his parents were killed by Native Americans. It was with the Comanches that Bowdrie learned how to hunt, track and how to survive. At age twelve the Comanches sent him back to live with the neighboring white population. From there Bowdrie went out on his own and began work on various cattle ranches and cowboys outfits. It was also during this time of teenage years that he is said to have come very close to riding on the wrong side of the law. He took up the nickname 'Chick' because an older and bigger boy who picked on him, was also named Charles but used the nickname Chuck. When he was older, Bowdrie defeated Chuck in a fistfight.

== Career as Texas Ranger ==
At age twenty-one Bowdrie became mixed up with the wrong crowd and ended up getting involved in a gunfight. Bowdrie was shot three times in the fight but was able to ride off. He was able to survive long enough to arrive at the cattle ranch of Noah Wipple. Noah and his family took him in, nursed him back to health and gave him a job. Only a few months later, Noah Wipple was murdered in the local town of Miller's Crossing. Bowdrie then went into town to pursue the man who had killed his friend and employer. When he arrived in town he saw a Help Wanted poster that was advertising a job for the Texas Rangers. Bowdrie thought he would be better equipped to catch Wipple's killer if he was on the right side of the law. He joined the Texas Rangers and was sworn in by Capt. Leander McNelly himself. From there Bowdrie remained riding for the law. From the eighteen short stories by Louis L'Amour, we know that during his career as a Ranger, Bowdrie has been responsible for multiple outlaws killed or captured. He has survived ten gunshot wounds and has been documented to have survived at least thirty-three gunfights. Bowdrie was twenty-five years old during the story Strange Pursuit, the last story written, so Browdrie's career and adventures as a ranger took place over the course of approximately four years. The sixth story written, Bowdrie Follows a Cold Trail takes place in the year 1885.

== Short Stories by Louis L'Amour ==
Louis L'Amour's Chick Bowdrie character was written for the pulp magazines of the 40s and 50s. The first Chick Bowdrie adventure A Job for a Ranger appeared in the December 1946 issue of Popular Western. The last Chick Bowdrie story Strange Pursuit was published in the April 1952 issue of Texas Rangers.
