= The Ferguson Rifle =

1973 novel by Louis L'Amour

- Author: Louis L'Amour
- Language: English
- Genre: Western novel
- Publisher: Bantam Books
- Publication date: 1973
- Publication place: United States
- Pages: 240
- ISBN: 978-0-553-25303-0

The Ferguson Rifle (1973) is a novel set in early 19th-century America, written by Louis L'Amour.

== Plot summary ==
The main character, Ronan Chantry, who is of Irish ancestry, is going into the West away from his troubles. Chantry's wife and son are dead, burned to death in the fire that consumed his home, for which he is blamed. He takes with him a Ferguson rifle, given to him by Major Ferguson himself. He meets up with an outfit of trappers after crossing the Mississippi River.

Although never stated directly, Chantry quickly becomes the leader of the group. Main members of the group are an Irishman, Davy Shanagan, and Solomon, who by the end of the book is revealed to be very well known throughout the wilderness. Early on the outfit's journey west, they encounter the Spanish Captain Fernandez accompanied by Ute Indians. The Captain attempts to arrest the outfit for trespassing on Spanish colonies. The outfit informs him that the land was bought under the Louisiana Purchase.

That night it is believed that Captain Fernandez attacks them but fails with two Utes being killed. The outfit presses on. Another night Chantry hears gunshots ring out in the distance after being awakened by a wolf who was trying to steal bacon. The next morning Chantry discovers the dead body of a man in a Mexican uniform. He searches the body and recovers a medallion. Chantry and Walks-by-Night back-track him and come to the realization that he was with a woman and boy and they had been chased and he had been killed. Chantry goes off by himself and encounters the girl and the boy.

== Main characters ==
- Ronan Chantry
- Davy Shanagan
- Solomon
- Captain Fernandez
- Walks-by-Night
- Lucinda Falvey
