= Herbert Smith (art director) =

British art director (1916–2006)

- Born: 1916; Hammersmith, London, United Kingdom
- Died: 2000 (aged 83–84); Sussex, United Kingdom
- Occupation: Art director
- Years active: 1948-1979 (film)

Herbert Smith (1916–2006) was a British art director. He was nominated for a BAFTA for Best British Art Direction for his work on the 1965 film The Hill.

== Selected filmography ==
- The Traitor (1957)
- The Roman Spring of Mrs. Stone (1961)
- The 7th Dawn (1964)
- The Hill (1965)
- Shalako (1968)
- Connecting Rooms (1970)
- Game for Vultures (1979)

== Bibliography ==
- Andreychuk, Ed. Louis L'Amour on Film and Television. McFarland, 2010.
