= Last of the Breed =

1987 novel by Louis L'Amour

- Author: Louis L'Amour
- Cover artist: Franco Accornero
- Language: English
- Genre: Adventure fiction
- Publisher: Bantam Books
- Publication date: 1987
- Publication place: United States
- Media type: Print (Paperback)
- Pages: 358 pp
- ISBN: 9780553051629
- Dewey Decimal: PS3523.A446 L365
- LC Class: 813.52

Last of the Breed is a 1986 book by American writer Louis L'Amour. It tells the fictional story of Native American United States Air Force pilot Major Joseph Makatozi (Joe Mack), captured by the Soviets over the Bering Strait. The story follows his escape from captivity through the Siberian wilderness as a fugitive.

Although the exact time is never stated, it appears to be the mid- to late 1980s, as Mikhail Gorbachev's rise to power is mentioned. It was L'Amour's second-to-last published novel.

== Plot summary ==
The start of the book chronicles Joe "Mack" Makatozi's daring escape from captivity and introduces another captive, an English chemist whom the Soviets believe is working on chemical warfare agents. The chemist is mentioned later, as the first mistake of their captor Zamatev, because it turned out he was only working on developing insect repellents.

The success of Mack's subsequent foot travel, across Siberia to the Bering Strait, is dependent on his Native American hunting, tracking, and evasion skills. It is mentioned several times in the text that these skills had been taught by his people to each generation, over thousands of years. Now, the skilled aviator must remember and practice the archery, fire-making, tracking, stalking, hunting, skinning, and ambush skills taught by his elders. Knowing that "a man with a knife can survive", he sneaks into a miner's cabin, and leaving no evidence he was there, steals preserved food, a heavy sweater, and a knife. Although this knife is needed for Mack to survive in the wilderness, his theft of the knife gives the Yakut tracking him a clue as to where to begin searching for Mack.

Mack also has strong attachments to his people's discipline and self-mastery. When he comes upon an army patrol he crawls inside an old hollow tree to hide. His pursuers make camp in the same area, and he must remain motionless until it gets dark, and only the sentries are awake. When captured, he is roughly beaten by his pursuers, but true to his heritage, he never makes a sound. A man who previously informed on him unlocks the shed he is in and allows Mack to escape. Mack ends up killing Alekhin the Yakut, who was following him, and sending his scalp back to Colonel Arkady Zamatev with a note written on birchbark that reads: "This was once a custom of my people. In my lifetime I shall take two. This is the first."

At the end of the book, the success of Mack's 90-mile kayak ride to Alaska is left unresolved. The resolution of the story is left to the reader's imagination.

== See also ==
- The Walking Drum, one of the author's other novels outside the Western genre
