= Three Little Twirps =

1943 film by Harry Edwards

- Directed by: Harry Edwards
- Written by: Monte Collins; Elwood Ullman
- Produced by: Del Lord; Hugh McCollum
- Starring: Moe Howard; Larry Fine; Curly Howard; Stanley Blystone; Chester Conklin; Anita Bolster; Bud Jamison; Heinie Conklin; Al Thompson; Duke York
- Cinematography: John Stumar
- Edited by: Paul Borofsky
- Distributed by: Columbia Pictures
- Release date: July 9, 1943 (U.S.)
- Running time: 15:27
- Country: United States
- Language: English

Three Little Twirps is a 1943 short subject directed by Harry Edwards starring American slapstick comedy team The Three Stooges (Moe Howard, Larry Fine, and Curly Howard). It is the 71st of the Stooges' 190 short-subject comedies, produced by Columbia Pictures between 1934 and 1957.

== Plot ==
Employed as paperhangers, the Stooges wreck a circus poster they were affixing to a billboard, leading to their dismissal by their boss, circus owner Herman. Having been paid off in tickets to the circus, they profit by selling the tickets at a discounted rate. However, they attract the attention of authorities, who chase them through the circus grounds.

Curly hides in the bearded lady's dressing room. Resisting her advances, Curly inadvertently knocks her out and has to assume her makeup and costume. To evade capture, he and Larry disguise themselves as a horse – which is about to be shot by a nearsighted animal trainer, to yield horsemeat for the lions.

The circus owner and the local sheriff confront the Stooges. When no one in the audience volunteers for the "human target" act, Herman recruits the Stooges. The "Sultan of Abba Dabba" aims spears at the hapless Stooges. Curly escapes the savage sultan by climbing a pole to a platform high above the ground. The savage follows, and Curly is trapped on the high wire. Moe and Larry grab a safety net – but the net turns out to be a clowns' prop, made of paper.

== Cast ==
- Curly Howard as Curly
- Larry Fine as Larry
- Moe Howard as Moe
- Stanley Blystone as Herman, circus owner
- Chester Conklin as animal trainer
- Duke York as the Sultan of Abba Dabba
- Anita Bolster as the bearded lady
- Bud Jamison as the sheriff
- Al Thompson as the man at the ticket window
- Heinie Conklin as Herman's assistant

== Production notes ==
Three Little Twirps was filmed from August 3 to August 7, 1942. It is the eighth of 16 Stooge shorts with the word "three" in the title.

Three Little Twirps marked the second and final Stooge film helmed by director Harry Edwards. Edwards was a former Mack Sennett director who had made many successful silent comedies. By the 1940s, however, his advancing age and fondness for alcohol worked against him. He became notorious as one of the studio's least efficient directors, often taking too much time and costing the company too much money. His previous project, the arduous Matri-Phony (1942), took three weeks to make, a singular departure from the Stooges' typical shooting schedule of three or four days. Although Edwards did speed up the Three Little Twirps shoot (five days), the Stooges had become frustrated and asked producer Jules White not to assign Edwards to their comedies. Fellow short-subject comedian Vera Vague made the same complaint. Edwards was championed by comedy star Harry Langdon, who kept Edwards on as his director. After Langdon died, Edwards was dismissed.

== Reception ==
Although filmed in April 1942, Three Little Twirps was held back from release until July 1943. Showmen's Trade Review gave it short shrift: "Typical of the Stooges is this latest release: slapstick and goo, mugging and merriment – if that's the word – and 'you smear me up and I'll smear you' technique, The boys are at it again, and for those who like 'em, Three Little Twirps is made to order." The Exhibitor offered no critical comment at all, apart from grading the short "fair". Film Daily agreed: "The Three Stooges repeat their familiar antics with fair success in their latest slapstick comedy. The story sets them loose in a circus, where they carry on fast and furiously to the delight strictly of the kids and such adults whose tastes in amusement are not of the highest."
