= The Haunted Mesa =

1987 novel by Louis L'Amour

- First edition
- Author: Louis L'Amour
- Cover artist: Clifford Bryclea
- Language: English
- Genre: Science fiction, adventure, weird West
- Publisher: Bantam Books
- Publication date: May 1987
- Publication place: United States; Canada
- Media type: Print (Hardback & Paperback)
- Pages: 357
- ISBN: 0-553-05182-2
- OCLC: 15284986
- Dewey Decimal: 813.52 e20
- LC Class: PS3523.A446 H3 1987

The Haunted Mesa is a 1987 science fiction novel by American writer Louis L'Amour, set in the American Southwest amidst the ruins of the Anasazi.

== Plot summary ==
Middle-aged man Mike Raglan specializes in paranormal investigations (and normally debunking the phenomena) has received urgent calls and mail from an old friend of his, Erik Hokart. Hokart was a scientist, inventor, and businessman who made a fortune in electronics. He was investigating a mountainous area in the Southwest, intending to build a secluded home on top of a mesa around which rumors had long swirled. His messages intimate that he is in deep trouble and desperately needs someone of his talents.

Hokart does not show up at the designated meeting spot, but the next day, Mike receives a package from him, delivered by a woman. A man breaks into his room to try to steal the package and is chased off with an Eric Ambler book and a threat from a .357 Magnum.

The package contains Hokart's journal of his quasi-archaeological expedition. The first night on the mesa, glowing lines appear on the blueprint of a kiva (a room used for religious rituals) attached to the ruins of the house Hokart was using as a makeshift shelter. Hokart is a little perturbed when the glowing lines turn out to be correct, and he begins to excavate the underground kiva even though it looks to have been deliberately buried. It creeps out both him and his large guard dog, "Chief".

Fully excavated, the kiva reveals itself as anomalous in having no sipapu but rather a blind window made out of a gray substance. After he finishes, Hokart discovers a pencil of his had been stolen and replaced with a jar. Afraid, Hokart begins to leave; Chief mistakes his abrupt movements for an intention to attack the kiva and plunges through the window and into a far invisible distance through to an alternate dimension. Erik begins to consider the legends and beliefs of the Hopi: they say their people originally came from the Third World, which was evil, and so they climbed up into a kiva in this, the Fourth World, to escape it; the speculation is that a malign power of the Third World was sealed by the burial of the kiva and that it wants the window to this world opened back up.

Erik rests. His pencil is returned the next day, worn down to a nub. He resharpens it and sets out again. They too vanish, as well as one of his cardigan sweaters. It returns with a newly made twin. Two days later, Chief returns, apparently none the worse for wear.

Having read thus far in Hokart's journal, Mike prepares to travel to the mesa, to personally investigate. He pauses to read further. As Hokart resolved to leave now that his dog had been returned, he is confronted by a raven-haired ivory-skinned woman who orders him to accompany her back through the portal in the kiva. He refuses, struck by a sense of menace radiating from her, and leaves. On the way down, he meets Kawasi, a young girl who is actually a renegade from the Third World. The woman was a "Poison Woman" who intended to imprison or kill him. They escape, and stop at a restaurant for dinner. He instructs Kawasi to get his journal to Mike, when the restaurant is surrounded by hired thugs. The journal ends with Erik making a break for the jeep and ordering Kawasi out the back.

Mike discovers that the restaurant had been destroyed that night in an abrupt and inexplicable fire. He finds Kawasi waiting for him in another nearby restaurant. She tells him, that night ended in Hokart's kidnapping. They are approached by the local constable, Gallagher. They tell him everything. Gallagher does not quite believe them but maintains an open mind.

Raglan determines to go into the Third World (named Shibalba by its inhabitants, who suffer under the decaying and decadent totalitarian regime of "The Hand" and his Lords of Shibalba) to rescue Hokart; the kiva entrance is guarded, so he intends to use a map to Shibalba he was given by an old cowboy who had stolen gold from, and barely escaped alive, the Third World. On his way, he meets "Tazzoc", a historian/archivist of Shibalba's forgotten archives, who wants to dissuade Raglan from his quest because it is hopeless and could only lead to trouble.

At the designated place, Raglan is frightened off by the presence of a squad of investigating Shibalban soldiers, "the Varanel, the Night Guards of Shibalba". Raglan confers with Gallagher and Tazzoc again, who promises to leave native clothes at the kiva entrance so Raglan can better blend in; Raglan promises to do what he can to save Tazzoc's archives and get them into wider circulation. A confrontation with a local agent of the Hand, Eden Foster, ends up as a brawl which Raglan wins.

He enters the Third World, enlisting the aid of Johnny (an old cowboy who had been trapped in the Third World for decades) as backup. Raglan rendezvouses with Tazzoc in his archives, located within the trap-filled citadel the Hand lives in and where Hokart is presumably being held, the Forbidden. The archives hold an ancient map from when the Forbidden was first built. With its aid he finds Hokart's cell – although he is hunted through the Forbidden by the arrogant agent Zipacna and his Varanel goons. Raglan's pistols win through the Varanel and rescue the starving Hokart. They break out and Johnny discourages pursuit with his rifle laying down covering fire on the pursuing Varanel.

A day later, as the portal back to the Fourth World quavers and begins to collapse, they meet Volkmeer, an old friend Raglan left to guard the kiva who has entered the employ of the Hand, and attempt to escape the Third World. Raglan, Hokart, and the others escape, but Volkmeer is caught in the portal as it becomes quiescent, and is killed.

== See also ==
- Weird West
