= Higher Than a Kite =

1943 film by Del Lord

- Directed by: Del Lord
- Written by: Monte Collins; Elwood Ullman
- Produced by: Del Lord; Hugh McCollum
- Starring: Moe Howard; Larry Fine; Curly Howard; Vernon Dent; Dick Curtis; Duke York
- Cinematography: John Stumar
- Edited by: Paul Borofsky
- Distributed by: Columbia Pictures
- Release date: July 30, 1943 (U.S.)
- Running time: 17:28
- Country: United States
- Language: English

Higher Than a Kite is a 1943 short subject directed by Del Lord starring American slapstick comedy team The Three Stooges (Moe Howard, Larry Fine and Curly Howard). It is the 72nd entry in the series released by Columbia Pictures starring the comedians, who released 190 shorts for the studio between 1934 and 1959.

== Plot ==
The Stooges want to fly for the Royal Air Force but find themselves relegated to the role of mechanics in an airport garage. Assigned the task of remedying a mysterious squeaking noise emanating from the Colonel's car by his assistant, Kelly, the Stooges embark on a series of mishaps. Curly has a harrowing encounter with the car's hood while opening it with a crowbar; Moe's head becomes lodged in a pipe; the windshield is shattered during an altercation; and the engine is dismantled in a futile search for the squeak. The Stooges hurriedly shovel the parts into the engine compartment before Kelly's return, but find themselves on the run after Kelly discovers their subterfuge, seeking refuge in a blockbuster bomb mistaken for a sewer pipe.

Events take a dramatic turn as the blockbuster is dropped behind enemy lines (reflecting the recent British bombing of Cologne, Germany, in June 1942). In a bid to evade capture, Moe and Curly adopt disguises as German officers, while Larry assumes the role of a woman named "Moronica." They unexpectedly encounter General Bommel and Marshall Boring (caricatures of German military figures Erwin Rommel and Hermann Göring, respectively), and the latter attempts a flirtation with "Moronica".

The Stooges seize enemy secrets from under the noses of the Nazi officers, incapacitating them in the process. During the trio's escape, a portrait of Hitler gets stuck to Curly's backside, which becomes the target of attack by a bulldog adorned in U.S. Marines regalia.

== Cast ==
=== Credited ===
- Moe Howard as Moe
- Larry Fine as Larry
- Curly Howard as Curly

=== Uncredited ===
- Duke York as Kelly
- Dick Curtis as General Bommel
- Vernon Dent as Marshall Boring
- Johnny Kascier as German Soldier
- George Gray as German Soldier
- Joe Garcio as German Soldier

== Production notes ==
Higher Than a Kite was filmed over five days on February 20–25, 1943. It was the only Stooge film to feature supporting actor Duke York in a non-monster role.

Footage of Moe getting his head wedged inside a pipe was reused in the 1960 compilation feature film Stop! Look! and Laugh!.
