= The Daybreakers (novel) =

1960 novel by Louis L'Amour

- Author: Louis L'Amour
- Language: English
- Genre: Western novel
- Publisher: Bantam Books
- Publication date: 1960
- Publication place: United States
- Pages: 204
- ISBN: 0-553-27674-3

The Daybreakers is a 1960 novel set in the latter half of 19th-century America (1867), written by Louis L'Amour. It is the first novel that he wrote about a Welsh and English family surnamed Sackett. He later wrote five novels that take place before The Daybreakers. There are a total of seventeen novels in "The Sacketts" series.

== Plot summary ==
Eighteen-year-old Tyrel Sackett must flee his home in Tennessee because he killed a man who was trying to kill his brother, Orrin, who catches up with him, and so begins their travels west, to New Mexico Territory, where “Spanish land grants are being voided by fraud”. They face hostile Native Americans, Mexicans, and White men. They also make friends along the way. In Mora, Orrin and Tyrel start a ranch and bring their mother to live with them in their new home.

William Tell Sackett, their oldest brother is mentioned, and he is the protagonist of the following Sackett novel, Sackett (1961).

== Main characters ==
- Tyrel “Tye” Sackett – the protagonist; Tyrel is skilled with horse and gun
- Orrin Sackett – Tye’s older brother; Orrin has a fine voice is likes talking, making speeches and singing
- Tom Sunday – Well-educated, skilled and able in all manner of tasks. He is similar in many ways to Orrin.
- Cap Rountree – a typical mountain man, tough and reliable
- Don Luis Alvarado – Drusilla’s grandfather; the don owns many thousands of acres in New Mexico
- Drusilla Alvarado – she is a good daughter, concerned about her family’s welfare
- Jonathan Pritts – Laura’s father; Jonathan is a newcomer to New Mexico, the villain of the story, he wishes to acquire land that is already owned by Mexicans
- Laura Pritts – daughter of Jonathan Pritts

== Themes ==
The trials and challenges of this world and the responsibilities of men. Good character traits, and bad ones. Literary scholar Harold Hinds Jr. writes that, “His heroes are independent and courageous, awkward with women, gifted fighting men, personifications of good. They are often as severely tested by Nature as by Indians, gunmen, thieves, and the like”. The Daybreakers is really no exception to this norm. L'Amour once remarked, "I’m actually writing history. It isn’t what you’d call big history. I don’t write about presidents and generals...I write about the man who was ranching, the man who was mining, the man who was opening up the country."

== Literary Criticism ==
Harold Hinds Jr. takes a wide look at Louis L'Amour's fiction and asserts, “L’Amour’s immense popularity rests on his superb storytelling and on his ability to write masterfully within the tradition of the popular American Western . . . The typical Western is an action-packed thriller set in the American West between 1865 and 1890. To create a sense of authenticity, considerable attention is paid to folklore, local color, and regionalism.” (130). "Popular" Western novels (rather than literary Western novels, such as Blood Meridian by Cormac McCarthy, or True Grit by Charles Portis) are well-known to be formulaic, but Hinds says, “Yet L’Amour does deviate, often quite creatively, from the standard Western formula. His novels are remarkable for their authentic settings and attention to historical detail”

Bruce Weber writes for L'Amour's New York Times obituary, "L’Amour’s prose does not, of course, rival Proust's, nor do his characters show too much complexity; the good guys and the bad guys are pretty clear from the beginning. But the plots are more or less irresistible...."
