= Old Man of the Mountain (nickname) =

Nickname of Hassan -i- sabbah

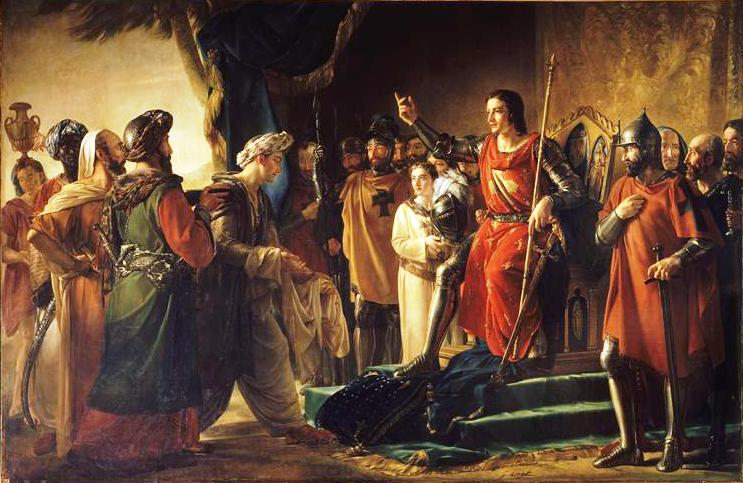
Saint Louis receiving the envoy of the "Old Man of the Mountain" (here referring to a Syrian Nizari leader) in Ptolemais. Painting by Georges Rouget in 1819.

The Old Man of the Mountain (Latin: Vetulus de Montanis)(Persian: پیرِ کوهستان, pir-e koohestan), is the expression first used by Marco Polo in a passage from Book of the Marvels of the World, to indicate Hasan-i Sabbah, the grand master of the "Order of Assassins" (the Nizari Ismaili state) who was based in the mountain fortress of Alamut. It later became a common name used by the Crusaders.

Subsequently, this nickname was given to various Isma'ili successors of Hassan, in Syria, particularly, for example Rashid al-Din Sinan, the da'i (missionary) and a leader of the Syrian branch of the Nizari Isma'ili state.

== See also ==
- List of Ismaili titles

== Bibliography ==
- Mirza, Naseeh Ahmed (20 July 1998). "Alamut. Bastion of Peace and Information". Alamut. Melbourne, Australia.
- Polo, Marco (1920) [c. 1300]. "Concerning the Old Man of the Mountain" . In Yule, Henry (ed.). The Travels of Marco Polo – via Wikisource.
- Wasserman, James (8 August 2017). "A Note to the Reader on the Historical Context". Templar Heresy: A Story of Gnostic Illumination. Destiny Books. ISBN 978-1-62055-658-0.
- Lewis, Bernard. Islam.
- "Rashid al-Din Sinan". Oxford Reference. 2003.
- Reston, James Jr. (2001). Warriors of God: Richard the Lionheart and Saladin in the Third Crusade. New York: Doubleday. ISBN 9780385495615.
