= Shalako (film) =

1968 British/American/German film by Edward Dmytryk

- Original film poster by Tom Chantrell
- Directed by: Edward Dmytryk
- Written by: J.J. Griffith; Hal Hopper
- Produced by: Euan Lloyd
- Starring: Sean Connery; Brigitte Bardot; Stephen Boyd; Jack Hawkins; Peter van Eyck; Honor Blackman; Woody Strode; Eric Sykes; Alexander Knox; Valerie French
- Cinematography: Ted Moore
- Edited by: John D. Guthridge; Bill Blunden
- Music by: Robert Farnon
- Production companies: Palomar Pictures International; Kingston Film Productions, Ltd. CCC Film
- Distributed by: Cinerama Releasing Corporation (USA); Anglo-Amalgamated Film Distributors (UK); Columbia-Bavaria Film (W. Germany)
- Release dates: 26 September 1968 (West Germany); 7 October 1968 (London); 11 December 1968 (UK); 13 December 1968 (SFC)
- Running time: 113 minutes
- Countries: United Kingdom; United States; West Germany
- Language: English
- Budget: $5 million
- Box office: $1,100,000（US Rentals） or $2,620,000(US)

Shalako is a 1968 Western film directed by Edward Dmytryk and starring Sean Connery and Brigitte Bardot. It was shot at Shepperton Studios near London with sets designed by the art director Herbert Smith. Location shooting took place in Almería in southern Spain, particularly in the Tabernas Desert which was frequently used in European westerns during the decade.

The cast also includes Stephen Boyd, Jack Hawkins, and Honor Blackman, Connery's co-star in Goldfinger. It is based on a 1962 novel of the same title by Louis L'Amour. It was the first in a trilogy of L'Amour adaptions from Euan Lloyd.

== Plot ==
In 1880 in New Mexico, frontier adventurer Bosky Fulton and his men lead a hunting party of European aristocrats and their servants, along with a retired American politician and his wife, into Apache territory. When a French countess, Irina Lazaar, wanders off, she is attacked by Apache warriors on horseback. She is rescued by Shalako, a former U.S. Cavalry officer with a personal interest in keeping non-Indians off Indian land. While on the way to returning her to the hunting party, they are surrounded by Apaches. They both promise the Apache chief they will get the outsiders off the land. The chief agrees, but his son, Chato, tells Shalako he intends to kill him in battle.

Shalako urges the leader of the hunting party, Baron Frederick von Hallstatt, to leave, but he refuses and the two men soon despise each other. Shalako rides off to get the army to escort the party off Apache land, but the Apaches attack and would overrun the party but for a smoke signal ruse of Shalako from some distance away.

The devious Fulton takes advantage of the lull in the fighting; he and his men take the hunting party's main stage coach, plus all the weapons and supplies, leaving the hunting party at the mercy of the Apaches. Lady Julia Daggett, seeing the hopeless situation of the party, decides to leave her husband, the pathetic Sir Charles Daggett, and go along as Fulton's lover. She and Fulton had previously teased each other in a sexually fraught manner.

Shalako returns to the stranded hunting party, which is re-equipped with weapons and supplies he had previously advised them to hide in reserve. He hopes to lead them on foot to a plateau where they will be temporarily safe. Shalako and von Hallstatt continue to feud, but over time their feelings evolve to mutual respect.

The Apaches attack the stage coach, killing all of Fulton's men and Lady Daggett. Fulton, having watched her killing, joins up with the hunting party. After they rebuff an initial Apache attack, the humiliated Sir Charles challenges Fulton, and they fatally shoot each other.

Chato and some other Apache warriors come up behind the Europeans, catching them by surprise. Chato challenges Shalako to a one-on-one fight with spears. Chato loses and is about to be killed when his father, the Apache chief, intervenes. He gives safe passage to Shalako and the others in return for his son's life. Chato storms off, feeling disgraced. With the surviving members of the party safe, Shalako rides off into the western landscape, accompanied by Countess Irina.

== Cast ==
- Sean Connery as Moses Zebulon "Shalako" Carlin
- Brigitte Bardot as Countess Irina Lazaar
- Stephen Boyd as Bosky Fulton
- Jack Hawkins as Sir Charles Daggett
- Peter van Eyck as Baron Frederick von Hallstatt
- Honor Blackman as Lady Julia Daggett
- Woody Strode as Chato, Apache Chief
- Eric Sykes as Mako
- Alexander Knox as Senator Henry Clarke
- Valerie French as Elena Clarke
- Julián Mateos as Rojas
- Don "Red" Barry as Buffalo
- Rodd Redwing as Chato's Father

== Production ==
=== Development ===
Producer Euan Lloyd was introduced to Louis L'Amour, author of numerous Western adventure novels, by his actor friend Alan Ladd. Over the years, as Lloyd dreamed of becoming an independent producer, he kept in touch with L'Amour. He wanted to film his 1962 novel Shalako. In 1965 Lloyd announced he had the rights.

Lloyd offered the project to director Edward Dmytryk when the latter was preparing Anzio. Dmytryk felt "the story was interesting, script awful" and agreed to direct if Lloyd had the script rewritten by an actor friend of the director, Jim Griffith. The producer acquiesced and Dmytryk said the new script "wasn't Shane or even Warlock but it wasn't bad." However he doubted Lloyd would be able to get the necessary stars to finance the movie. At one time, Lloyd had lined up Henry Fonda and Senta Berger to star in the film, planning to shoot it in Mexico. This was announced in 1966. Lloyd later recounted that, at the time, many film distributors were reluctant to back a film starring Fonda, and increases in the cost of filming in Mexico made it impossible to pursue.

During a meeting with L'Amour, Lloyd recounted long lines at the cinemas in New York City for the latest James Bond adventure film. L'Amour remarked that Sean Connery, who starred in the role, would certainly "look tall in the saddle". When Lloyd met Sean Connery and discussed the work with him, he learned that Connery was a Western fan since childhood. He was also keen to do the film as he had been promised $1 million and 30% of the profits out of the $5 million budget. Connery's casting was announced in June 1967.

Connery was available, as he had turned down playing Bond in On Her Majesty's Secret Service. Lloyd obtained that film's planned original co-star Brigitte Bardot, Bond cinematographer Ted Moore, and Bond stuntman and action scene arranger Bob Simmons. Bardot turned down the female lead in On Her Majesty's Secret Service for Shalako. She was paid $400,000 plus 12.5% of the profits. It was her second Western, the first being Viva Maria (1965). The second female lead, Honor Blackman, had appeared opposite Connery in Goldfinger. Lee Radziwill was reportedly considered for a role.

Once Lloyd had Connery on board, many European and other film distributors were keen to finance the film. Distributors in 35 different countries agreed to provide promissory notes worth $5 million payable on delivery of the film. This enabled Lloyd to raise the $3 million necessary to start production and to sign Connery and Bardot. $1,455,000 of the budget came from the American company Palomar, a subsidiary of the ABC network with $2 million from elsewhere. Dimitri de Grunwald became involved in helping finance. Nat Cohen of Anglo-Amalgamated agreed to distribute in the UK.

Lloyd gathered a strong international cast, including Connery's former co-star Honor Blackman from Goldfinger, as well as Jack Hawkins, Stephen Boyd, Woody Strode, Peter van Eyck, Alexander Knox, Eric Sykes, and Don Barry. At this stage in his career Hawkins had lost his once-booming voice to throat cancer, his voice was dubbed by Charles Gray; this was Hawkins' second appearance after the operation the first being The Great Catherine. Woody Strokde agreed to play an Indian chief if his friend, Tug Smith, was cast alongside him.

=== Shooting ===
The film was shot in Almería, Spain. Whilst scouting locations when planning to film in the United States, Lloyd had noticed that many Native Americans were overweight. He did not think they looked menacing enough. Simmons recruited a "war party" of lean and mean Romani people (gypsies), whom he trained to ride and act like war-bent Apaches.

Simmons talked Connery into shaving off the droopy Snub Pollard moustache which he had grown for the historic period. The investors perhaps remembered Gregory Peck's moustache in The Gunfighter, which was believed to have discouraged some of the public from attending. They feared the same might happen with Shalako.

Almería province was a favoured location for filming spaghetti Westerns. But, when Shalako was in production, Harry Saltzman's Second World War film, Play Dirty, set in North Africa, was being filmed on the same locations. One film crew had to wipe out the tyre tracks in the sand before filming the Old West, whilst the other had to pick up the horse droppings before shooting the Second World War battles. Once the gypsy Apaches, mounted on horseback, rode by mistake headlong into an attack on a Long Range Desert Group.

Connery and Bardot got on well during filming and both enjoyed the experience of making the film. Dmytryk called Bardot a "conscientious worker" during the film.

== Censorship ==
Two scenes are routinely cut when the film is shown on television: the death of the cowboy sent to protect Bardot's character; and the death of Honor Blackman's character.

== Release ==
The film made its world premiere in Munich on 26 September 1968, then in San Francisco the following month.

== Reception ==
=== Critical ===
The film premiered in late 1968 to mixed reviews. Some critics thought the film was not as good as the other Westerns being made in Europe, in particular, the Italian westerns (known as "spaghetti Westerns") by which Sergio Leone, Lee Van Cleef, and Clint Eastwood were building their reputations.

Variety called it "robust" with "strong box office appeal".

=== Box office ===
Shalako was the 18th most popular film of 1969. It recorded admissions of 1,385,466 in France and 1,272,933 in Spain and 4,200,000 in Italy. According to Variety, because of its high costs and profit participation the film recorded a loss for ABC of $1,275,000. But since every area was sold separately, Shalako was hugely successful in Britain and on the Continent, it has generated significant profits for the distributors.

Euan Lloyd went on to produce two other adaptations of Louis L'Amour novels, Catlow and A Man Called Noon.

== Home media ==
Shalako has been released in many territories on VHS and DVD, and in 2017 was released on Blu-ray from Kino Lorber in the US.

== Bibliography ==
- Dmytryk, Edward (1978). It's a hell of a life, but not a bad living. NYT Times Books.
