= Shalako (novel) =

Book by Louis L'Amour

- First edition (publ. Bantam Books)
- Author: Louis L'Amour
- Language: English
- Publisher: Bantam Books
- Publication date: 1962

Shalako is a 1962 Western novel by Louis L'Amour and the name of a town that the author intended to build. It would have been a working town typical of those of the nineteenth-century Western frontier. Funding for the project fell through, and Shalako, which would have been named in honor of the protagonist of the novel, was never built.

== Film adaptation ==
The novel was made into the film Shalako in 1968, starring Sean Connery and Brigitte Bardot.
