= Louis L'Amour =

American novelist and short story writer (1908–1988)

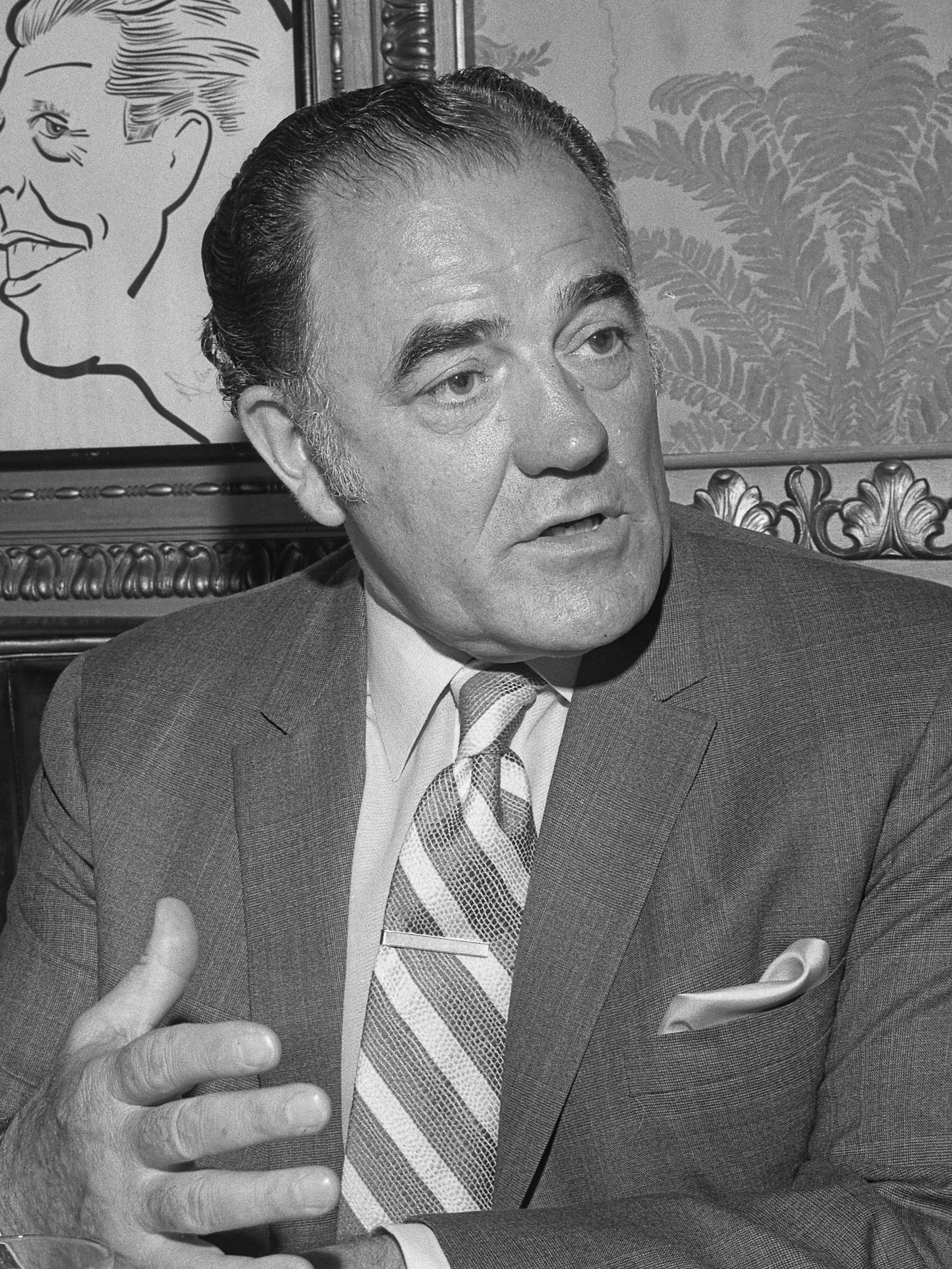
- L'Amour in 1970
- Born: Louis Dearborn LaMoore; March 22, 1908; Jamestown, North Dakota, U.S.
- Died: June 10, 1988 (aged 80); Los Angeles, California, U.S.
- Resting place: Forest Lawn Memorial Park
- Occupations: Novelist, short story writer
- Spouse(s): Kathy (widowed 1988)
- Children: 2
- Writing career
- Pen name: Tex Burns
- Genres: Western, science fiction, adventure, non-fiction
- Military career
- Allegiance: United States
- Branch: United States Army
- Rank: Lieutenant
- Units: 362nd Quartermaster Truck Company
- Conflicts: World War II

Louis Dearborn L'Amour (/ˈluːi ləˈmʊər/; né LaMoore; March 22, 1908 – June 10, 1988) was an American novelist and short story writer. His books consisted primarily of Western novels, though he called his work "frontier stories". His most widely known Western fiction works include Last of the Breed, Hondo, Shalako, and the Sackett series. L'Amour also wrote historical fiction (The Walking Drum), science fiction (The Haunted Mesa), non-fiction (Frontier), and poetry and short-story collections. Many of his stories were made into films. His books remain popular and most have gone through multiple printings. At the time of his death, almost all of his 105 existing works (89 novels, 14 short-story collections, and two full-length works of nonfiction) were still in print, and he was "one of the world's most popular writers".

== Life and career ==
=== Early life ===
Louis Dearborn LaMoore was born in Jamestown, North Dakota, on March 22, 1908, the seventh child of Emily Dearborn and veterinarian, local politician, and farm equipment broker Louis Charles LaMoore (who had changed the French spelling of the name L'Amour). His mother had Irish ancestry, while his father was of French-Canadian descent. His father had arrived in Dakota Territory in 1882. Although the area around Jamestown was mostly farm land, cowboys and livestock often traveled through Jamestown on their way to or from ranches in Montana and the markets to the east. Louis played "Cowboys and Indians" in the family barn, which served as his father's veterinary hospital, and spent much of his free time at the local library, the Alfred E. Dickey Free Library, particularly reading the works of 19th-century British historical boys' author G. A. Henty. L'Amour once said, "[Henty's works] enabled me to go into school with a great deal of knowledge that even my teachers didn't have about wars and politics."

After a series of bank failures devastated the economy of the upper Midwest, Dr. LaMoore and Emily took to the road. Removing Louis and his adopted brother John from school, they headed south in the winter of 1923. Over the next seven or eight years, they skinned cattle in west Texas, baled hay in the Pecos Valley of New Mexico, worked in the mines of Arizona, California and Nevada, and in the sawmills and lumber camps of the Pacific Northwest. It was in colorful places like these that Louis met a wide variety of people, upon whom he later modeled the characters in his novels, many of them actual Old West personalities who had survived into the 1920s and 1930s.

Making his way as a mine assessment worker, professional boxer, and merchant seaman, Louis traveled the country and the world, sometimes with his family, sometimes not. He visited all of the western states plus England, Japan, China, Borneo, the Dutch East Indies, Arabia, Egypt, and Panama, finally moving with his parents to Choctaw, Oklahoma in the early 1930s. There, he changed his name to the original French spelling "L'Amour" and settled down to try to make something of himself as a writer.

=== Early works ===
He had success with poetry, articles on boxing and writing and editing sections of the WPA Guide Book to Oklahoma, but the dozens of short stories he was churning out met with little acceptance. Finally, L'Amour placed a story, Death Westbound, in "10 Story Book", a magazine that featured what was supposed to be quality writing (Jack Woodford, author of several books on writing, is published in the same edition as L'Amour) alongside scantily attired or completely naked young women. Several years later, L'Amour placed his first story for pay, Anything for a Pal, published in True Gang Life. Two lean disappointing years passed after that, and then, in 1938, his stories began appearing in pulp magazines fairly regularly.

Along with other adventure and crime stories, L'Amour created the character of mercenary sea captain Jim Mayo. Starting with East of Gorontalo, the series ran through nine episodes from 1940 until 1943. L'Amour wrote only one story in the western genre prior to World War II, 1940's The Town No Guns Could Tame.

=== World War II service and post-war ===
L'Amour continued as an itinerant worker, traveling the world as a merchant seaman until the start of World War II. During World War II, he served in the United States Army as a lieutenant with the 362nd Quartermaster Truck Company. In the two years before L'Amour was shipped off to Europe, L'Amour wrote stories for Standard Magazine. After World War II, L'Amour continued to write stories for magazines; his first after being discharged in 1946 was Law of the Desert Born in Dime Western Magazine (April 1946). L'Amour's contact with Leo Margulies led to L'Amour agreeing to write many stories for the Western pulp magazines published by Standard Magazines, a substantial portion of which appeared under the name "Jim Mayo". The suggestion of L'Amour writing Hopalong Cassidy novels also was made by Margulies who planned on launching Hopalong Cassidy's Western Magazine at a time when the William Boyd films and new television series were becoming popular with a new generation. L'Amour read the original Hopalong Cassidy novels, written by Clarence E. Mulford, and wrote his novels based on the original character under the name "Tex Burns". Only two issues of the Hopalong Cassidy Western Magazine were published, and the novels as written by L'Amour were extensively edited to meet Doubleday's thoughts of how the character should be portrayed in print. Strongly disagreeing—L'Amour preferred Mulford's original, much rougher characterization of Cassidy—for the rest of his life he denied authoring the novels.

In the 1950s, L'Amour began to sell novels. L'Amour's first novel, published under his own name, was Westward The Tide, published by World's Work in 1951. The short story The Gift of Cochise was printed in Colliers (5 July 1952) and seen by John Wayne and Robert Fellows, who purchased the screen rights from L'Amour for $4,000. James Edward Grant was hired to write a screenplay based on this story changing the main character's name from Ches Lane to Hondo Lane. L'Amour retained the right to novelize the screenplay and did so, even though the screenplay differed substantially from the original story. This was published as Hondo in 1953 and released on the same day the film opened with a blurb from John Wayne stating that "Hondo was the finest Western Wayne had ever read". During the remainder of the decade L'Amour produced a great number of novels, both under his own name as well as others (e. g. Jim Mayo). Also during this time he rewrote and expanded many of his earlier short story and pulp fiction stories to book length for various publishers.

=== Bantam Books ===
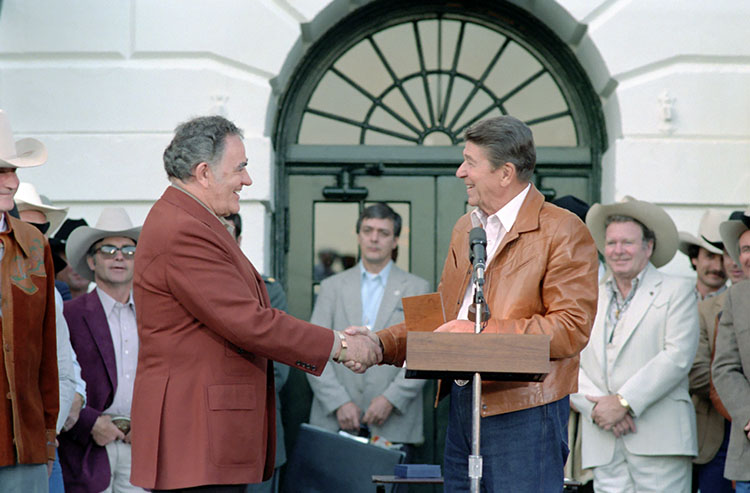
L'Amour with U.S. President Ronald Reagan in September 1983

Many publishers in the 1950s and '60s refused to publish more than one or two books a year by the same author. Louis's editor at Gold Medal supported his writing up to three or four but the heads of the company vetoed that idea even though Louis was publishing books with other houses. Louis had sold over a dozen novels and several million copies before Bantam Books editor-in-chief Saul David was finally able to convince his company to offer Louis a short term exclusive contract that would accept three books a year. It was only after 1960, however, that Louis's sales at Bantam would begin to surpass his sales at Gold Medal.

L'Amour's career flourished throughout the 1960s and he began work on a series of novels about the fictional Sackett family. The Daybreakers, published in 1960 and the first, was actually not in the chronological order of the series of novels. Initially he wrote five books about William Tell Sackett and his close relatives; however, in later years the series spread to include other families and four centuries of North American history. It was an ambitious project and several stories intended to close the gaps in the family's time line were left untold at the time of L'Amour's death. L'Amour also branched out into historical fiction with The Walking Drum, set in the 11th century, a contemporary thriller, Last of the Breed, and science fiction with The Haunted Mesa.

L'Amour eventually wrote 100 novels, over 250 short stories, and (as of 2010) sold more than 320 million copies of his work. By the 1970s his writings were translated into over ten languages. Every one of his works is still in print.

== Audio book publishing ==
Many of the L'Amour titles have been produced in the "single voice" style. In the early days, however, when the fledgling Bantam Audio Publishing (now Random House Audio) came to L'Amour about converting some of his old short stories into audio, he insisted that they do something to offer the audience more value than just having an actor read a bunch of old pulp stories. Together he and Bantam executive Jenny Frost created the concept of a series of "Radio Drama" style productions that would combine a large cast of actors, sound effects and music to produce a modern audio drama of each story.

The team of David Rapkin (Producer) and Charles Potter (Director) was employed to produce a prototype show and L'Amour's son Beau came into the program as Supervising Producer. Between 1986 and 2004 the team had completed over sixty-five dramatized audio productions. Several different styles of show were produced over the years. The first several shows were "transcriptions", literal breakdowns of the exact L'Amour short story into lines for the different characters and narrator. Later productions used more liberally interpreted adaptations written by screenwriters, playwrights and a few film and theater students, who were taught the process by Beau L'Amour and the more prolific writers from earlier adaptations.

The majority of productions were done in New York City. In the early years the pace of production was six shows a year but in the mid-1990s it slowed to four. At this time the running time for all the programs was roughly sixty minutes. The cast members were veterans of the New York stage, film and advertising worlds and came together for a rehearsal and then a day of recording the show. Sound effects were created by effects man Arthur Miller in the studio as the lines were being recorded and narration was done.

Although many of the programs were written and produced in a modified "Old Time Radio" style, attempts were also made to modernize the approach. Whenever the story material supported it a more contemporary style was used in the writing and more and more high tech solutions to the effects and mix found their way into the productions. While hiring and supervising the writers, mostly out of Los Angeles, Beau L'Amour created a few programs on his own. The techniques used by him and producer/editor Paul O'Dell were more in line with motion picture production, simply taping the voices of the actors in the studio and then recording the majority of sound effects in the field. This called for a great deal more editing, both in cutting the actor's performances and the sound effects, but it allowed for a great deal more control.

In the mid-1990s a series of the L'Amour Audio Dramas was recut for radio. Louis L'Amour Theater played on over two hundred stations for a number of years. Several of the scripts from the L'Amour series have been produced as live theater pieces, including The One for the Mojave Kid and Merrano of the Dry Country.

The L'Amour program of Audio Dramas is still ongoing but the pace of production has slowed considerably. Beau L'Amour and Paul O'Dell released Son of a Wanted Man, the first L'Amour Drama in half a decade in 2004. Son of a Wanted Man is also the first Louis L'Amour novel to be turned into a drama. Considerably more complex than earlier shows it had a cast of over twenty mid-level Hollywood actors, a music score was created by John Philip Shenale and recorded specifically for the production and sound effects completely recorded in the field in many locations across the west. Produced as sort of a "profitable hobby" Beau L'Amour and Paul O'Dell created the production while working around their day-to-day jobs. Since this allowed them no more than nine or ten weeks a year, the show took four years to complete.

== Shalako ==
During the 1960s, L'Amour intended to build a working town typical of those of the 19th century Western frontier, with buildings with false fronts situated in rows on either side of an unpaved main street and flanked by wide boardwalks before which, at various intervals, were watering troughs and hitching posts. The town, to be named Shalako after the protagonist of L'Amour's novel of the same name, was to have featured shops and other businesses that were typical of such towns: a barber shop, a hotel, a dry goods store, one or more saloons, a church, a one-room schoolhouse, etc. It would have offered itself as a filming location for Hollywood motion pictures concerning the Wild West. However, funding for the project fell through, and Shalako was never built.

== Literary assessment ==
When interviewed not long before his death, he was asked which among his books he liked best. His reply:

I like them all. There's bits and pieces of books that I think are good. I never rework a book. I'd rather use what I've learned on the next one, and make it a little bit better. The worst of it is that I'm no longer a kid and I'm just now getting to be a good writer. Just now.

The critic Jon Tuska, surveying Western literature, writes:

I have no argument that L'Amour's total sales have probably surpassed every other author of Western fiction in the history of the genre. Indeed, at the time of his death his sales had topped 200,000,000. What I would question is the degree and extent of his effect "upon the American Imagination". His Western fiction is strictly formulary and frequently, although not always, features the ranch romance plot where the hero and the heroine are to marry at the end once the villains have been defeated. Not only is there nothing really new in the basic structure of his stories, even L'Amour's social Darwinism, which came to characterize his later fiction, was scarcely original and was never dramatized in other media the way it was in works based on Zane Grey's fiction.

But Tuska also notes "At his best, L'Amour was a master of spectacular action and stories with a vivid, propulsive forward motion."

== Awards ==
In May 1972 he was awarded an Honorary PhD by Jamestown College, as a testament to his literary and social contributions.

In 1979, he received the Golden Plate Award of the American Academy of Achievement.

Bendigo Shafter (1979) won the U.S. National Book Award in the one-year category Western.

In 1982 he received the Congressional Gold Medal, and in 1984 President Ronald Reagan awarded L'Amour the Presidential Medal of Freedom. L'Amour is also a recipient of North Dakota's Roughrider Award and the MPTF Golden Boot Award.

== Death ==
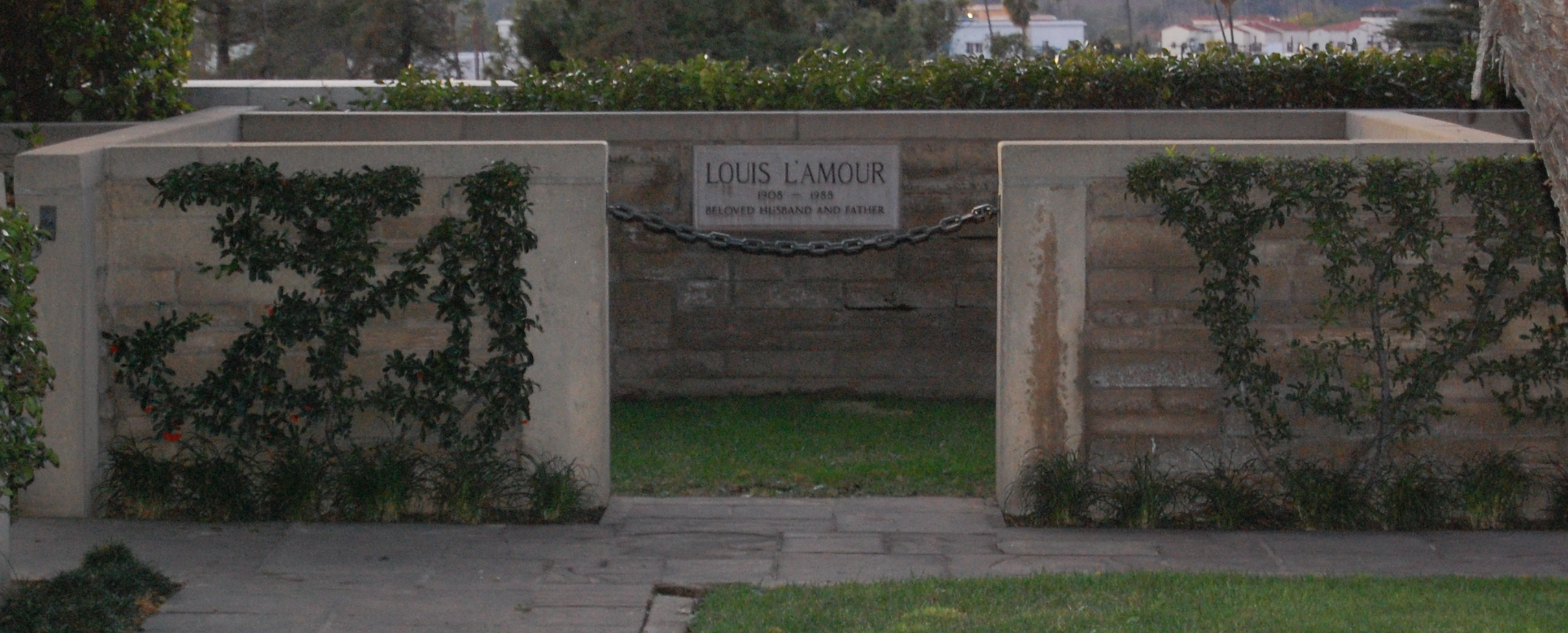
L'Amour's grave

L'Amour, a non-smoker, died from lung cancer at his home in Los Angeles on June 10, 1988, and was buried at Forest Lawn Memorial Park Cemetery in Glendale, California. His autobiography detailing his years as an itinerant worker in the west, Education of a Wandering Man, was published posthumously in 1989. He was survived by his wife Kathy, their son Beau, and their daughter Angelique.

== Bibliography ==
=== Novels ===
(including series novels)

- Westward the Tide (London, 1950; first US publication 1976) ISBN 0-553-24766-2
- The Riders of High Rock (1951) ISBN 0-553-56782-9
- The Rustlers of West Fork (1951) ISBN 0-553-29539-X
- The Trail to Seven Pines (1951) ISBN 0-553-56178-2
- Trouble Shooter (1952) ISBN 0-553-57187-7
- Hondo (1953) ISBN 0-553-80299-2
- Showdown at Yellow Butte (1953) ISBN 0-553-27993-9
- Crossfire Trail (1954) ISBN 0-553-28099-6
- Kilkenny (1954) ISBN 0-553-24758-1
- Utah Blaine (1954) ISBN 0-553-24761-1
- Heller with a Gun (1955) ISBN 0-553-25206-2
- Guns of the Timberlands (1955) ISBN 0-553-24765-4
- To Tame a Land (1955) ISBN 0-7393-4406-4
- The Burning Hills (1956) ISBN 0-553-28210-7
- Silver Canyon (1956) ISBN 0-553-24743-3
- Last Stand at Papago Wells (1957) ISBN 0-553-25807-9
- Sitka (1957) ISBN 0-451-20308-9
- The Tall Stranger (1957) ISBN 0-553-28102-X
- Radigan (1958) ISBN 0-553-28082-1
- The First Fast Draw (1959) ISBN 0-553-25224-0
- Taggart (1959) ISBN 0-553-25477-4
- The Daybreakers (1960) ISBN 0-553-27674-3
- Flint (1960) ISBN 0-553-25231-3
- Sackett (1961) ISBN 0-553-06205-0
- High Lonesome (1962) ISBN 0-553-25972-5
- Killoe (1962) ISBN 0-553-25742-0
- Lando (1962) ISBN 0-7393-2114-5
- Shalako (1962) ISBN 0-553-24858-8
- Catlow (1963) ISBN 0-553-24767-0
- Dark Canyon (1963) ISBN 0-553-25324-7
- Fallon (1963) ISBN 0-553-28083-X
- How the West Was Won (1963) ISBN 0-553-26913-5
- Hanging Woman Creek (1964) ISBN 0-553-24762-X
- Mojave Crossing (1964) ISBN 0-7393-2115-3
- Kiowa Trail (1964) ISBN 0-553-24905-3
- The High Graders (1965) ISBN 0-553-27864-9
- The Key-Lock Man (1965) ISBN 0-553-28098-8
- The Sackett Brand (1965) ISBN 0-7393-4221-5
- The Broken Gun (1966) ISBN 0-553-24847-2
- Kid Rodelo (1966) ISBN 0-553-24748-4
- Kilrone (1966) ISBN 0-553-24867-7
- Mustang Man (1966) ISBN 0-7393-2116-1
- Matagorda (1967) ISBN 0-553-59180-0
- The Sky-Liners (1967) ISBN 0-553-27687-5
- Brionne (1968) ISBN 0-553-28107-0
- Chancy (1968) ISBN 0-553-28085-6
- Down the Long Hills (1968) ISBN 0-553-28081-3 (winner of the Golden Spur Award)
- Conagher (1969) ISBN 0-553-28101-1
- The Empty Land (1969) ISBN 0-553-25306-9
- The Lonely Men (1969) ISBN 0-553-27677-8
- Galloway (1970) ISBN 0-7393-2118-8
- The Man Called Noon (1970) ISBN 0-553-24753-0
- Reilly's Luck (1970) ISBN 0-553-25305-0
- The Ferguson Rifle (1973) ISBN 0-553-25303-4
- North to the Rails (1971) ISBN 0-553-28086-4
- Tucker (1971) ISBN 0-553-25022-1
- Under the Sweetwater Rim (1971) ISBN 0-553-24760-3
- Callaghen (1972) ISBN 0-553-24759-X
- Ride the Dark Trail (1972) ISBN 0-553-27682-4
- The Man from Skibbereen (1973) ISBN 0-553-24906-1
- The Quick and the Dead (1973) ISBN 0-553-28084-8
- Treasure Mountain (1973) ISBN 0-553-27689-1
- The Californios (1974) ISBN 0-553-25322-0
- Sackett's Land (1974) ISBN 0-553-27686-7
- The Man From the Broken Hills (1975) ISBN 0-553-27679-4
- Over on the Dry Side (1975) ISBN 0-553-25321-2
- Rivers West (1975) ISBN 0-553-25436-7
- The Rider of Lost Creek (1976) ISBN 0-553-25771-4
- To the Far Blue Mountains (1976) ISBN 0-553-27688-3
- Where the Long Grass Blows (1976) ISBN 0-553-28172-0
- Borden Chantry (1977) ISBN 0-553-27863-0
- Fair Blows the Wind (1978) ISBN 0-553-27629-8
- The Mountain Valley War (1978) ISBN 0-553-25090-6
- Bendigo Shafter (1979) ISBN 0-553-26446-X (winner of the National Book Award)
- The Iron Marshal (1979) ISBN 0-553-24844-8
- The Proving Trail (1979) ISBN 0-553-25304-2
- Lonely on the Mountain (1980) ISBN 0-553-27678-6
- The Warrior's Path (1980) ISBN 0-553-27690-5
- Comstock Lode (1981) ISBN 0-553-27561-5
- Milo Talon (1981) ISBN 0-553-24763-8
- The Cherokee Trail (1982) ISBN 0-553-27047-8
- The Shadow Riders (1982) ISBN 0-553-23132-4
- The Lonesome Gods (1983) ISBN 0-553-27518-6
- Ride the River (1983) ISBN 0-553-50251-4
- Son of a Wanted Man (1984) ISBN 0-553-24457-4
- The Walking Drum (1984) ISBN 0-553-28040-6
- Jubal Sackett (1985) ISBN 0-553-27739-1
- Passin' Through (1985) ISBN 0-553-25320-4
- Last of the Breed (1986) ISBN 0-553-28042-2
- West of Pilot Range (1986) ISBN 0-553-26097-9
- A Trail to the West Audio (1986) ISBN 0-553-45009-3
- The Haunted Mesa (1987) ISBN 0-553-27022-2

=== Collections of short stories ===
- War Party (1975, featuring The Gift of Cochise and Trap of Gold)
- The Strong Shall Live (1980)
- Yondering (1980; revised edition 1989)
- Buckskin Run (1981)
- Bowdrie (1983)
- The Hills of Homicide (1983)
- Law of the Desert Born (1983)
- Bowdrie's Law (1984)
- Night Over the Solomons (1986)
- The Rider of the Ruby Hills (1986)
- Riding for the Brand (1986)
- The Trail to Crazy Man (1986)
- Dutchman's Flat (1986)
- Man Riding West (1986)
- Lonigan (1988)
- Long Ride Home (1989)
- The Outlaws of Mesquite (1990)
- West from Singapore (1991)
- Valley of the Sun (1995)
- West of Dodge (1996)
- End of the Drive (1997)
- Monument Rock (1998)
- Beyond the Great Snow Mountains (1999)
- Off the Mangrove Coast (2000)
- May There Be a Road (2001)
- With These Hands (2002)
- From the Listening Hills (2003)
- The Collected Short Stories of Louis L'Amour:
  - The Frontier Stories – Volume 1 (2003)
  - The Frontier Stories – Volume 2 (2004)
  - The Frontier Stories – Volume 3 (2005)
  - The Adventure Stories – Volume 4 (2005)
  - The Frontier Stories – Volume 5 (2007)
  - The Crime Stories – Volume 6 (2008)
  - The Frontier Stories – Volume 7 (2009)

=== Non-fiction ===
- Education of a Wandering Man (1989)
- Frontier
- The Sackett Companion
- A Trail of Memories: The Quotations of Louis L'Amour (compiled by Angelique L'Amour)

=== Poetry ===
- Smoke From This Altar (1939)

=== Compilations with other authors ===
- The Golden West
- Stagecoach

=== Recurring Characters ===
L'Amour often wrote series of novels and short stories featuring previously introduced characters, the most notable being the Sackett clan.

=== Sackett series ===
In fictional story order (not the order written).

1. Sackett's Land – Barnabas Sackett
2. To the Far Blue Mountains – Barnabas Sackett
3. The Warrior's Path – Kin Ring Sackett
4. Jubal Sackett – Jubal Sackett, Itchakomi Ishai
5. Ride the River – Echo Sackett (Aunt to Orrin, Tyrel, and William Tell Sackett; also involves Chantrys and numerous other Sacketts including three Clinch Mountain Sacketts Trulove, Macon, and Mordecai. Also includes her uncle Regal. And, mentions her brother Ethan who could be the Ethan Sackett in 'Bendigo Shafter')
6. The Daybreakers – Orrin and Tyrel Sackett, Cap Rountree, Tom Sunday
7. Lando – Orlando Sackett, the Tinker
8. Sackett – William Tell Sackett, Cap Rountree, Angie
9. Mustang Man – Nolan Sackett
10. Mojave Crossing – William Tell Sackett
11. The Sackett Brand – William Tell Sackett, and the whole passel of Sacketts!
12. The Sky-liners – Flagan and Galloway Sackett
13. Galloway – Flagan and Galloway Sackett
14. The Lonely Men – William Tell Sackett
15. Ride the Dark Trail – Logan Sackett, Em Talon (born a Sackett)
16. Treasure Mountain – William Tell and Orrin Sackett, the Tinker
17. Lonely on the Mountain – William Tell, Orrin and Tyrel Sackett (They go on a mission to help Logan Sackett)

There are also two Sackett-related short stories:

- "The Courting of Griselda" – William Tell Sackett (available in End of the Drive)
- "Booty for a Badman" – William Tell Sackett (originally published in the Saturday Evening Post 30 July 1960; available in War Party)

Sacketts are also involved in the plot of 10 other novels:

- Bendigo Shafter – Ethan Sackett
- Dark Canyon – William Tell Sackett
- Borden Chantry – Joe Sackett (killed in ambush) and Tyrel Sackett
- Passin' Through – Parmalee Sackett is mentioned as defending a main character in the book. Also, a main character is a Higgins.
- Son of a Wanted Man – Tyrel Sackett
- Catlow – Ben Cowan marries a cousin of Tyrel Sackett's wife
- Man from the Broken Hills – Em Talon is a main character in this book and was, in fact, born a Sackett. Mentions William Tell Sackett.
- Chancy – The main character, Otis Tom Chancy, reveals that he is a distant relative of the Sacketts. In addition, the Gates cow outfit claims they are headed west because a Sackett told them of a wonderful, green valley to be had there.
- The Iron Marshal – In Chapter 6, the Rig Barrett papers state that Henry Drako had trouble with a man named Sackett over a stolen horse in Tennessee and was run out of the state.
- Milo Talon – In the final gun battle with John Topp, Milo tells him that he, Milo, is a Sackett because his mother was a Sackett.

=== Talon series ===
(Note: The Talon and Chantry series are often combined into one list for a total of eight)

- Rivers West
- The Man from the Broken Hills (Em Talon was born a Sackett. She is the main character's mother.)
- Milo Talon (is a cousin to the Sacketts through his mother, Em Talon)

=== Chantry series ===
- Fair Blows the Wind (the first Chantry)
- The Ferguson Rifle – Ronan Chantry
- Over on the Dry Side
- Borden Chantry
- North to the Rails – Tom Chantry (Borden Chantry's son)

=== Kilkenny series ===
- The Rider of Lost Creek (1976), expanded from the short novel published in the April 1947 issue of West magazine, under the "Jim Mayo" pseudonym.
- The Mountain Valley War (1978), expanded from the novella A Man Called Trent, originally published in the December 1947 issue of West magazine, also under the "Jim Mayo" pseudonym. A Man Called Trent is included in the collection The Rider of the Ruby Hills (1986).
- Kilkenny (1954)
- A Gun for Kilkenny is a short story featuring Kilkenny as a minor character, from the collection Dutchman's Flat (1986).
- West of Dodge is a short story from the collection of the same name.
- Monument Rock is a novella, from the collection Monument Rock (1998).

=== Hopalong Cassidy series ===
Originally published under the pseudonym "Tex Burns". Louis L'Amour was commissioned to write four Hopalong Cassidy books in the spring and summer of 1950 by Doubleday's Double D Western imprint. They were the first novels he ever had published and he denied writing them until the day he died, refusing to sign any of them that fans would occasionally bring to his autograph sessions. The reason given to his young son for doing this was, "I wrote some books. I just did it for the money, and my name didn't go on them. So now, when people ask me if they were mine, I say 'no.'" When his son asked if this would be a lie, he said, "I just wrote them for hire. They weren't my books."

- The Rustlers of West Fork
- The Trail to Seven Pines
- The Riders of High Rock
- Trouble Shooter

=== Tumbling K series ===
- West of the Pilot Range (1947, short story)
- McQueen of the Tumbling K (1947, short story)
- Bad Place to Die (1955, short story)
- West of the Tularosa (1951, short story)
- Roundup in Texas (1949, short story)
- Grub Line Rider (1951, short story)

=== Chick Bowdrie series ===
- McNelly Knows a Ranger (1947, short story)
- A Job for a Ranger (1946, short story)
- Bowdrie Rides a Coyote Trail (1947, short story)
- A Trail to the West (1947, short story)
- The Outlaws of Poplar Creek (1947, short story)
- Bowdrie Follows a Cold Trail (1947, short story)
- More Brains Than Bullets (1948, short story)
- The Road to Casa Piedras (1948, short story)
- Bowdrie Passes Through (1948, short story)
- Where Buzzards Fly (1948, short story)
- South of Deadwood (1948, short story)
- Too Tough to Brand (1949, short story)
- Case Closed – No Prisoners (1949, short story)
- The Killer from the Pecos (1950, short story)
- A Ranger Rides to Town (1950, short story)
- Rain on the Mountain Fork (1951, short story)
- Down Sonora Way (1951, short story)
- Strange Pursuit (1952, short story)
- Strawhouse Trail (short story, first known publication 1998 collection Monument Rock)

=== Cactus Kid series ===
- No Trouble for the Cactus Kid (1947, short story)
- Medicine Ground (1948, short story)
- Love and the Cactus Kid (1950, short story)
- The Cactus Kid Pays a Debt (1952, short story)
- Battle at Burnt Camp (short story, first known publication 1998 collection Monument Rock)
- The Cactus Kid (1953, short story)

== Film adaptations ==
- Crossfire Trail, 2001. (TV) (novel) a.k.a. Louis L'Amour's Crossfire Trail (US). Starring Tom Selleck, Virginia Madsen, and Wilford Brimley. Directed by Simon Wincer.
- The Diamond of Jeru (2001) (TV) (short story) a.k.a. Louis L'Amour's The Diamond of Jeru (US: complete title)
- Shaughnessy (1996) (TV) (novel The Iron Marshal) a.k.a. Louis L'Amour's Shaughnessy (Australia), and, Louis L'Amour's Shaughnessy the Iron Marshal (US: DVD box title)
- Conagher (1991) (TV) (novel) a.k.a. Louis L'Amour's Conagher, Starring Sam Elliott and Katharine Ross. Directed by Reynaldo Villalobos.
- The Quick and the Dead (1987) (HBO TV) (novel), Starring Sam Elliott and Kate Capshaw. Directed by Robert Day.
- Louis L'Amour's Down the Long Hills (1986) (TV) (novel) a.k.a. Down the Long Hills
- Five Mile Creek (39 episodes, 1983–1985) (TV Series based on novel The Cherokee Trail)
  - Walk Like a Man (1984) TV Episode (inspiration The Cherokee Trail)
  - When the Kookaburra Cries (1984) TV Episode (inspiration The Cherokee Trail)
- The Shadow Riders (1982) (TV) (novel) a.k.a. Louis L'Amour's The Shadow Riders
- The Cherokee Trail (1981) (TV) (story) a.k.a. Louis L'Amour's The Cherokee Trail (US) Produced by The Wonderful World of Disney and starring Victor French and Richard Farnsworth.
- The Sacketts (1979) (TV) (novels The Daybreakers and Sackett) a.k.a. The Daybreakers (US: cut version)
- Hombre llamado Noon, Un (1973) (novel) a.k.a. The Man Called Noon (Philippines: English title) (UK) (US) & Lo chiamavano Mezzogiorno (Italy)
- Cancel My Reservation (1972) (novel The Broken Gun)
- Catlow (1971) (novel)
- Shalako (1968) (novel) ... a.k.a. Man nennt mich Shalako (West Germany)
- Hondo (17 episodes, 1967)
  - Hondo and the Rebel Hat (1967) TV Episode (character)
  - Hondo and the Apache Trail (1967) TV Episode (character)
  - Hondo and the Gladiators (1967) TV Episode (character)
  - Hondo and the Hanging Town (1967) TV Episode (character)
  - Hondo and the Death Drive (1967) TV Episode (character)
- Hondo and the Apaches (1967) (TV) (story The Gift of Cochise)
- Kid Rodelo (1966) (novel)
- Taggart (1964) (novel)
- Guns of the Timberland (1960) (novel)
- Heller in Pink Tights, 1960 (film) (novel) Starring Anthony Quinn and Sophia Loren. Directed by George Cukor. Adapted from Heller With a Gun.
- Stagecoach West (1960) TV Episode (story)
- Apache Territory (1958) (novel Last Stand at Papago Wells)
- The Tall Stranger (1957) (novel Showdown Trail), The Rifle (US) and Walk Tall (US: alternative title)
- Maverick (1 episode, October 27, 1957, Season 01 Episode 06) Stage West Adapted from a magazine article.
- Sugarfoot (1 episode, 1957) ... a.k.a. Tenderfoot (UK)
- The Strange Land (1957) TV Episode (story)
- Utah Blaine (1957) (novel)
- The Burning Hills (1956) (novel)
- Flowers for Jenny (1956) TV Episode (story)
- Blackjack Ketchum, Desperado (1956) (novel Kilkenny)
- City Detective (1 episode, 1955)
- Man Down, Woman Screaming (1955) TV Episode (story)
- Stranger on Horseback (1955) (story)
- Climax! (1 episode, 1955) ... a.k.a. Climax Mystery Theater (US)
- The Mojave Kid (1955) TV Episode (story)
- Treasure of Ruby Hills (1955) (story)
- Four Guns to the Border (1954) (story) ... a.k.a. Shadow Valley (US)
- Hondo (1953) (story The Gift of Cochise) Starring John Wayne and Geraldine Page.
- East of Sumatra (1953) (story)

== See also ==
- Sackett Family
- Hopalong Cassidy
- Louis Masterson
