= Trap of Gold =

Short story by Louis L'Amour

"Trap of Gold" is a Western short story by American author Louis L'Amour. It was originally published in Argosy magazine (Volume 333 Number 2 Pages 24–25, 74-76) in August 1951.

== Plot introduction ==
The main character in “Trap of Gold” is multi-faceted. Within the story, the established protagonist, Wetherton, is digging for gold in the outback mine to support his family, yet the precious metal is concealed under a rickety rock tower. Through several tense events, he displays his most obvious inclinations to be cautious, greedy, and loving.

== Plot summary ==
After becoming familiar with Wetherton, his carefulness towards danger reveals itself. Everything he comes across is dealt with in a watchful, meticulous manner. For example, when he discovers the batholith, “his innate caution takes hold, and he draws back to examine it at greater length”. Only after he inspects it does he begin to remove gold. Soon following his study of the rock, he continues in his guarded manner, and he constructs a supported path for a swift retreat, in the situation that the massive structure collapses. Even when removing the gold from the stone, he refrains from swinging the pickaxe; he painstakingly removes pieces using the pick as a bar to prevent structural damage. Apparently, his life is driven by his nature to warily review his surroundings.

Even though he is alert in personality, he quickly becomes blinded by riches. He swiftly develops recklessness in his dealings with the immense rock. For instance, he observes that “the tilt of the outer wall is obvious and it can stand no more without toppling”. In spite of this finding, he is lured by an irresistible force that is beyond rational thinking and he returns once more to retrieve the hidden wealth. Furthermore, he revisits day after day, although he sees fissures in the surface and hears it shudder and creak. Continually the reader finds Wetherton unsatisfied with his haul; he persistently yearns for just one more sack.

While his lust for money may hold true, the reader looks deeper and discovers the motivation: a love for his family. Every moment he risks his life for gold is driven by his devotion to his loved ones. As he begins to work, one realizes that “the gold he [is] extracting from [the] rock [is] for [his family], and not for himself”. Evidently, he holds his wife's and son's lives above his own. Not only does he begin his search for them, but he chooses to stop out of commitment to them as well. Just when the circumstances climax to extreme danger (when the batholith is foreshadowing collapse) Wetherton realizes that seeing his family again is more valuable than any amount of gold. By gambling with his life for his spouse and his child, his heartfelt loyalty emerges. He becomes happy by discovering this mine in the outback.

The rock eventually falls, but Wetherton is safely out of the way of the falling batholith, and he escapes with his life.

It is lucid that Louis L ‘Amour’s short story, “Trap of Gold”, envelops a very complex character in the adventurer, Wetherton. Within the plot progression, the reader uncovers his personality, primarily through his openness to possible problems, an almost unyielding desire for valuables, and a moving passion for his family.
