= The Tall Stranger =

1957 western novel by Louis L'Amour

First edition

The Tall Stranger is a western novel by Louis L'Amour. It was written in 1957 and first published by Gold Medal Books. A filmed version starred Joel McCrea and Virginia Mayo.

== Plot ==
The story starts out in the 1860s with Ned Bannon coming across cattle rustlers who shoot him and leave him for dead. A group of wagon trainers finding Ned Bannon badly wounded and all alone take him in and are soon approached by Mort Harper, who tells them of a great new trail that is perfectly safe. Bannon tells them it leads only to Bishop's Valley and not beyond that, but they follow Harper. Bannon knows about this paradise because his hostile half-brother owns the valley. When they come to Bishop's Valley, Harper convinces the members of the wagon train to stay in the valley. When Bannon tries to warn them of his half-brother he is forced out of the camp with a gun to his back by Harper and his gang. Harper and his gang try to drag the settlers into a land war, but ultimately Bannon outsmarts them. In the fighting Bannon's brother, the original white settler in the valley, dies redeeming himself for a lifetime of hating his brother. The settlers stay.
