= List of Warner Bros. films (1950–1959) =

This is a list of films produced, co-produced, and/or distributed by Warner Bros. Pictures, Inc. in the 1950s. This list does not include third-party films or films Warner gained the rights to as a result of mergers or acquisitions.

== 1950 ==
Release date	Title	Notes
January 28, 1950	Montana	
February 11, 1950	Backfire	
February 18, 1950	Chain Lightning	
March 1, 1950	Young Man with a Horn	
March 11, 1950	Perfect Strangers	
March 18, 1950	Barricade	
April 15, 1950	Stage Fright	British film co-production with Transatlantic Pictures
April 29, 1950	The Daughter of Rosie O'Grady	
May 7, 1950	The Damned Don't Cry	
May 19, 1950	Caged	
May 27, 1950	Colt .45	
June 17, 1950	This Side of the Law	
June 24, 1950	Return of the Frontiersman	
June 27, 1950	Fifty Years Before Your Eyes	
July 2, 1950	Bright Leaf	
July 9, 1950	The Flame and the Arrow	
July 15, 1950	The Great Jewel Robber	
August 19, 1950	Kiss Tomorrow Goodbye (Note: Owned by Paramount Pictures (via Melange Pictures))	distribution only; produced by William Cagney Productions
September 2, 1950	Tea for Two	
September 16, 1950	Pretty Baby	
September 28, 1950	The Glass Menagerie	
October 6, 1950	The Breaking Point	
October 14, 1950	Three Secrets	distribution only; produced by United States Pictures
November 11, 1950	Rocky Mountain	
November 17, 1950	Breakthrough	
November 25, 1950	The West Point Story	
December 1, 1950	Highway 301	
December 30, 1950	Dallas	

== 1951 ==
Release date	Title	Notes
January 27, 1951	Operation Pacific	
February 10, 1951	Storm Warning	
February 11, 1951	Sugarfoot	
February 24, 1951	The Enforcer	distribution only; produced by United States Pictures
March 26, 1951	Lullaby of Broadway	
April 7, 1951	Raton Pass	
April 12, 1951	Lightning Strikes Twice	
April 21, 1951	Only the Valiant'	distribution only; produced by William Cagney Productions
May 5, 1951	I Was a Communist for the FBI	
May 18, 1951	Inside the Walls of Folsom Prison	
May 19, 1951	Goodbye, My Fancy	
June 2, 1951	Along the Great Divide	
July 3, 1951	Strangers on a Train	co-production with Transatlantic Pictures; Inducted into the National Film Registry in 2021
July 14, 1951	Fort Worth	
July 26, 1951	On Moonlight Bay	
August 13, 1951	Force of Arms	
August 24, 1951	Jim Thorpe – All-American	
September 13, 1951	Captain Horatio Hornblower	
September 18, 1951	A Streetcar Named Desire	Inducted into the National Film Registry in 1999
September 22, 1951	Tomorrow Is Another Day	
October 10, 1951	Painting the Clouds with Sunshine	
October 24, 1951	Come Fill the Cup	
October 31, 1951	The Tanks Are Coming	
October 1951	Close to My Heart	
December 6, 1951	I'll See You in My Dreams	
December 14, 1951	Starlift	
December 25, 1951	Distant Drums	distribution only; produced by United States Pictures

== 1952 ==
Release date	Title	Notes
January 26, 1952	Room for One More	
February 5, 1952	The Big Trees	in Public domain
February 9, 1952	This Woman Is Dangerous	
February 19, 1952	Retreat, Hell!	distribution only; produced by United States Pictures
February 28, 1952	Bugles in the Afternoon	distribution only; produced by William Cagney Productions
April 12, 1952	Jack and the Beanstalk	distribution only; produced by Exclusive Productions in Public domain
April 23, 1952	Mara Maru	
May 17, 1952	The Lion and the Horse	
May 17, 1952	The San Francisco Story (Note: Owned by Universal Pictures)	distribution only; produced by Fidelity Pictures
May 23, 1952	About Face	
June 13, 1952	Carson City	
June 20, 1952	The Winning Team	
June 26, 1952	Where's Charley?	
June 26, 1952	3 for Bedroom C (Note: Owned by Universal Pictures (via DreamWorks Classics)) (Note: Owned by Shout! Studios (via Westchester Films))	distribution only
July 12, 1952	She's Working Her Way Through College	
July 26, 1952	The Story of Will Rogers	
August 20, 1952	The Miracle of Our Lady of Fatima	
August 30, 1952	Big Jim McLain	co-production with Wayne/Fellows Productions
September 6, 1952	Cattle Town	
September 27, 1952	The Crimson Pirate	
October 25, 1952	Springfield Rifle	
November 8, 1952	Operation Secret	
November 19, 1952	The Iron Mistress	
December 10, 1952	Stop, You're Killing Me	
December 24, 1952	April in Paris	
December 27, 1952	Abbott and Costello Meet Captain Kidd	distribution only; produced by Woodley Productions
December 30, 1952	The Jazz Singer	

== 1953 ==
Release date	Title	Notes
January 31, 1953	The Man Behind the Gun	
March 14, 1953	She's Back on Broadway	
March 22, 1953	I Confess	co-production with Transatlantic Pictures
March 26, 1953	By the Light of the Silvery Moon	
March 28, 1953	The Blue Gardenia	distribution only; produced by Blue Gardenia Productions
April 4, 1953	Trouble Along the Way	
April 18, 1953	The System	
April 25, 1953	House of Wax	Inducted into the National Film Registry in 2014
May 30, 1953	The Desert Song	
June 13, 1953	The Beast from 20,000 Fathoms	distribution only; produced by Jack Dietz Productions
June 27, 1953	South Sea Woman	
June 28, 1953	Elizabeth Is Queen	
July 11, 1953	The Charge at Feather River	
July 15, 1953	So This Is Love	
August 5, 1953	The Master of Ballantrae	
August 24, 1953	The Beggar's Opera (Note: Owned by StudioCanal)	British film distribution only; produced by British Lion Films
August 26, 1953	Plunder of the Sun (Note: Owned by Batjac Productions with Paramount Pictures handling distribution)	distribution only; produced by Wayne/Fellows Productions
September 5, 1953	Island in the Sky	distribution only; produced by Wayne/Fellows Productions
September 19, 1953	The Moonlighter	co-production with Joseph Bernhard Productions Inc. and Abtcon Pictures
September 23, 1953	A Lion Is in the Streets	
October 7, 1953	Blowing Wild	distribution only; produced by United States Pictures
October 27, 1953	Thunder Over the Plains	
October 31, 1953	So Big	
November 4, 1953	Calamity Jane	
November 23, 1953	Three Sailors and a Girl	
November 27, 1953	Hondo	distribution only; produced by Wayne/Fellows Productions
November 28, 1953	The Diamond Queen	distribution only; produced by Melson Productions
December 25, 1953	The Eddie Cantor Story	

== 1954 ==
Release date	Title	Notes
January 15, 1954	The Command	Filmed in Cinemascope
January 16, 1954	His Majesty O'Keefe	co-production with Norma Productions
February 27, 1954	The Boy from Oklahoma	
March 6, 1954	Crime Wave	
March 16, 1954	Duffy of San Quentin	co-production with Swarttz-Doniger Productions
March 27, 1954	Phantom of the Rue Morgue	
April 1, 1954	Riding Shotgun	
April 9, 1954	Lucky Me	Filmed in Cinemascope
May 29, 1954	Dial M for Murder (Note: Co-owned by SGL Entertainment)	
June 19, 1954	Them!	
July 3, 1954	The High and the Mighty	distribution only; produced by Wayne/Fellows Productions; Filmed in Cinemascope
July 19, 1954	Rasputin	French/Italian film; distribution only; produced by Radius Productions
July 24, 1954	Ring of Fear	distribution only; produced by Wayne/Fellows Productions; Filmed in Cinemascope
August 7, 1954	King Richard and the Crusaders	Filmed in Cinemascope
August 21, 1954	Duel in the Jungle	distribution only; produced by Associated British Picture Corporation and Marcel Hellman Productions
September 4, 1954	Dragnet	distribution only, produced by Mark VII Limited
September 25, 1954	The Bounty Hunter	Public domain
October 16, 1954	A Star Is Born	Inducted into the National Film Registry in 2000; Filmed in Cinemascope co-production with Transcona Enterprises
November 10, 1954	Drum Beat	Filmed in Cinemascope co-production with Jaguar Productions
November 19, 1954	Track of the Cat	distribution only; produced by Wayne/Fellows Productions; Filmed in Cinemascope
December 20, 1954	The Silver Chalice	Filmed in Cinemascope co-production with Victor Saville Productions

== 1955 ==
Release date	Title	Notes
January 19, 1955	Unchained	distribution only; produced by Hal Bartlett Productions
January 20, 1955	Young at Heart	distribution only; produced by Arwin Productions
February 2, 1955	Battle Cry	Filmed in Cinemascope
February 18, 1955	New York Confidential	US distribution only; produced by Edward Small Productions
April 10, 1955	East of Eden	Inducted into the National Film Registry in 2016; Filmed in Cinemascope
April 12, 1955	Strange Lady in Town	Filmed in Cinemascope
June 4, 1955	The Sea Chase	Filmed in Cinemascope
June 18, 1955	Tall Man Riding	
June 24, 1955	Land of the Pharaohs	Filmed in Cinemascope co-production with The Continental Company
July 10, 1955	Mister Roberts	Filmed in Cinemascope
July 16, 1955	The Dam Busters	US theatrical distribution only; produced by Associated British Picture Corporation
July 31, 1955	Pete Kelly's Blues	Filmed in Cinemascope co-production with Mark VII Limited
September 16, 1955	Jump into Hell	
September 29, 1955	The McConnell Story	Filmed in Cinemascope
October 1, 1955	Blood Alley	Filmed in Cinemascope
October 27, 1955	Rebel Without a Cause	Inducted into the National Film Registry in 1990; Filmed in Cinemascope
October 28, 1955	Illegal	
November 1, 1955	Sincerely Yours	co-production with International Artists, Ltd.
November 9, 1955	I Died a Thousand Times	Filmed in Cinemascope
November 15, 1955	Target Zero	
December 31, 1955	The Court-Martial of Billy Mitchell	distribution only; produced by United States Pictures; Filmed in Cinemascope

== 1956 ==
Release date	Title	Notes
January 26, 1956	Helen of Troy	Filmed in Cinemascope
January 28, 1956	Hell on Frisco Bay	co-production with Jaguar Productions and Ladd Productions; Filmed in Cinemascope
February 25, 1956	The Lone Ranger	theatrical distribution only; produced by Wrather Productions
March 5, 1956	The River Changes	
March 10, 1956	The Steel Jungle	
March 23, 1956	Serenade	
March 31, 1956	Miracle in the Rain	
April 24, 1956	Our Miss Brooks	co-production with Lute Productions, Inc.
May 12, 1956	Good-bye, My Lady	co-production with Batjac Productions
May 26, 1956	The Searchers	Inducted into the National Film Registry in 1989; Filmed in VistaVision co-production with C.V. Whitney Pictures
May 30, 1956	The Animal World	
June 2, 1956	Mr. Arkadin	France distribution only; produced by Mercury Productions
June 27, 1956	Moby Dick (Note: Owned by MGM (via United Artists) worldwide and StudioCanal in the UK)	theatrical distribution only; produced by Moulin Productions
July 13, 1956	Santiago	
July 21, 1956	Satellite in the Sky	Filmed in Cinemascope co-production with Danziger Productions Ltd. and New Elstree Studios
August 4, 1956	Seven Men from Now	distribution only; produced by Batjac Productions
August 17, 1956	A Cry in the Night	co-production with Jaguar Productions
September 12, 1956	The Bad Seed	
September 1956	The Burning Hills	Filmed in Cinemascope
October 26, 1956	The Girl He Left Behind	
October 1956	Toward the Unknown	co-production with Toluca Productions
November 24, 1956	Giant	Inducted into the National Film Registry in 2005
December 18, 1956	Baby Doll (Note: Rights currently shared with Westchester Films (via Castle Hill Productions))	
December 23, 1956	The Wrong Man	

== 1957 ==
Release date	Title	Notes
January 30, 1957	Top Secret Affair	
February 21, 1957	The Spirit of St. Louis	Filmed in Cinemascope
March 1, 1957	The Big Land	co-production with Jaguar Productions
March 29, 1957	Elena and Her Men	French/Italian film; US distribution only
May 1, 1957	Deep Adventure	
May 1, 1957	X the Unknown	British film distribution only; produced by Hammer Film Productions for RKO Pictures
May 4, 1957	Shoot-Out at Medicine Bend	
May 10, 1957	Untamed Youth	British film US distribution only; produced by Amalgamated Productions
May 11, 1957	The Counterfeit Plan	
May 28, 1957	A Face in the Crowd	Inducted into the National Film Registry in 2008
June 5, 1957	The D.I.	co-production with Mark VII Limited
June 13, 1957	The Prince and the Showgirl	co-production with Marilyn Monroe Productions
June 25, 1957	The Curse of Frankenstein	British film co-production with Hammer Films
August 3, 1957	Band of Angels	
August 10, 1957	The Rising of the Moon	
August 29, 1957	The Pajama Game	
September 12, 1957	Woman in a Dressing Gown	distribution only; produced by Associated British Picture Corporation
September 15, 1957	Black Patch	co-production with Montgomery Productions
September 24, 1957	Johnny Trouble	
October 1, 1957	The Abominable Snowman	UK distribution only; produced by Hammer Film Productions
October 5, 1957	The Helen Morgan Story	Filmed in Cinemascope
October 11, 1957	The Black Scorpion	
October 18, 1957	The James Dean Story	distribution only
November 8, 1957	The Story of Mankind	co-production with Cambridge Productions
November 22, 1957	Bombers B-52	Filmed in Cinemascope
December 5, 1957	Sayonara (Note: Owned by MGM (via Orion Pictures))	theatrical distribution only
December 14, 1957	The Green-Eyed Blonde	co-production with Arwin Productions

== 1958 ==
Release date	Title	Notes
January 15, 1958	The Deep Six	co-production with Jaguar Productions
February 12, 1958	Darby's Rangers	
March 17, 1958	Lafayette Escadrille	
March 24, 1958	Chase a Crooked Shadow	British film US distribution only; produced by Associated British Picture Corporation
April 11, 1958	Manhunt in the Jungle	
April 17, 1958	Too Much, Too Soon	
April 18, 1958	Fort Dobbs	
April 24, 1958	Marjorie Morningstar'	distribution only; produced by Beachwold Productions
May 3, 1958	Stakeout on Dope Street	
May 7, 1958	The Left Handed Gun	
May 10, 1958	Violent Road	co-production with Aubrey Schenck Productions
May 29, 1958	No Time for Sergeants	
June 7, 1958	Dangerous Youth	British film US distribution only; produced by Associated British Picture Corporation
June 26, 1958	Indiscreet	theatrical distribution only; produced by Grandon Productions
August 2, 1958	Badman's Country	co-production with Robert E. Kent Productions and Peerless Productions
August 6, 1958	The Naked and the Dead	distribution only; produced by RKO Radio Pictures
September 11, 1958	Wind Across the Everglades	
September 26, 1958	Damn Yankees	
October 10, 1958	Girl on the Run	
October 11, 1958	The Old Man and the Sea	
October 25, 1958	Onionhead	
November 8, 1958	Enchanted Island	distribution only; produced by RKO Radio Pictures & Benedict Bogeaus
November 16, 1958	Home Before Dark	
November 26, 1958	From the Earth to the Moon	distribution only; produced by RKO Radio Pictures and Waverly Productions
November 29, 1958	Born Reckless	
December 27, 1958	Auntie Mame	

== 1959 ==
Release date	Title	Notes
February 11, 1959	The Hanging Tree	co-production with Baroda Productions
March 4, 1959	Up Periscope	
April 4, 1959	Rio Bravo	Inducted into the National Film Registry in 2014 co-production with Armada Productions
April 25, 1959	Westbound	
May 7, 1959	Island of Lost Women	theatrical distribution only; produced by Jaguar Productions in Public domain
May 21, 1959	Gigantis the Fire Monster (Note: Owned by Toho under its original title, with distribution rights currently licensed to Universal Pictures (via DreamWorks Classics))	US distribution of 1955 Japanese Toho film Godzilla Raids Again
May 30, 1959	The Young Philadelphians	
June 3, 1959	Teenagers from Outer Space	theatrical distribution only; produced by Tom Graeff Productions in Public domain
June 16, 1959	John Paul Jones	
July 18, 1959	The Nun's Story	
July 22, 1959	Hercules	US distribution only
September 15, 1959	Look Back in Anger	US distribution only; produced by Woodfall Film Productions and Associated British Picture Corporation
October 31, 1959	The FBI Story	
November 11, 1959	-30-	co-production with Mark VII Limited
November 11, 1959	Yellowstone Kelly	
November 12, 1959	The Miracle	
November 18, 1959	A Summer Place	

== See also ==
- List of New Line Cinema films
- List of films based on DC Comics publications
- List of Warner Bros. theatrical animated feature films
- Category:Lists of films by studio
