= George J. Lewis =

Mexican actor (1903–1995)

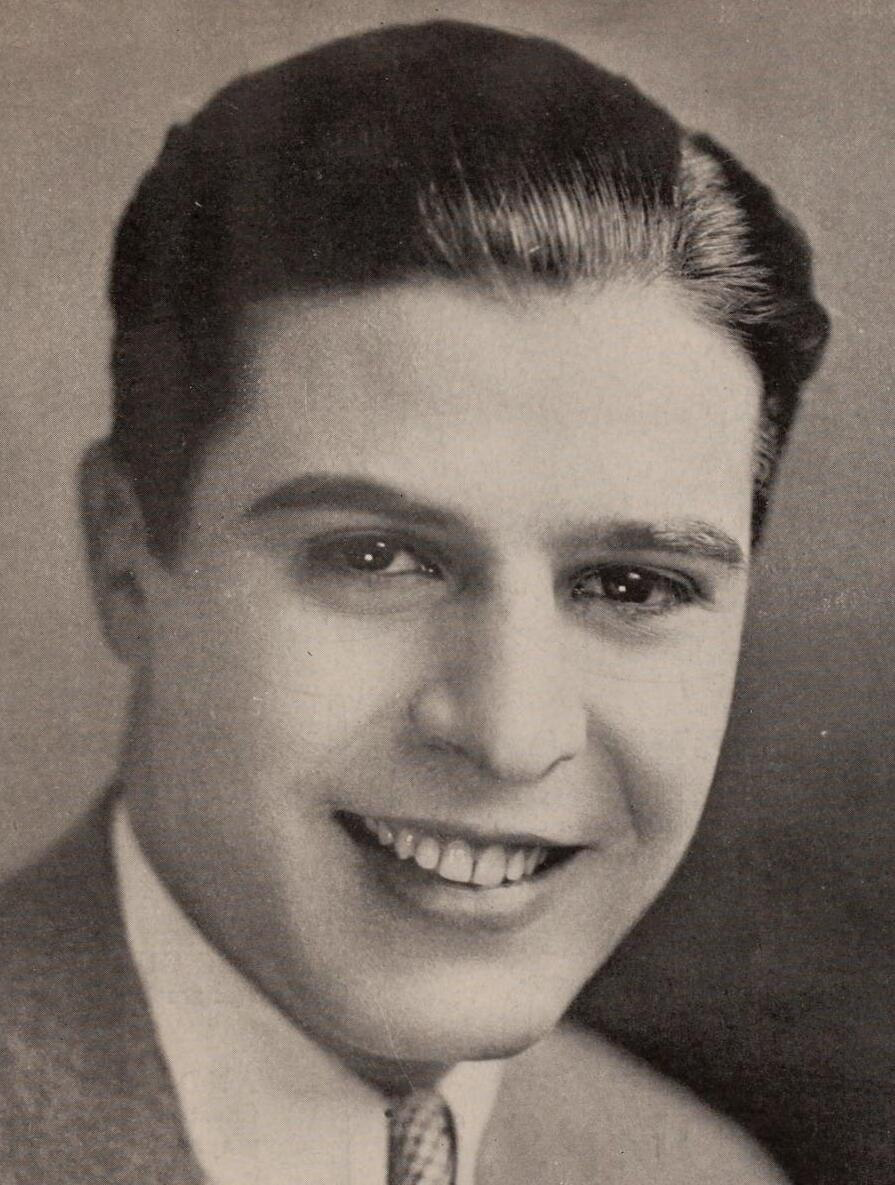
- Lewis c. 1926
- Born: December 10, 1903; Guadalajara, Jalisco, Mexico
- Died: December 8, 1995 (aged 91); Rancho Santa Fe, California, US
- Years active: 1923–1969
- Spouse: Mary Louise Lohman (m. 1928)

George Joseph Lewis (December 10, 1903 – December 8, 1995) was an American actor who appeared in many films from the 1920s through the 1960s and also in TV series when that new medium began, usually specializing in westerns. He is probably best known for playing Don Alejandro de la Vega, who was Don Diego de la Vega's father in the 1950s Disney television series Zorro. Lewis co-starred in Zorro's Black Whip and had a minor role in Ghost of Zorro before starring as Don Alejandro in the Disney series.

== Early life ==
George Joseph Lewis was born in Guadalajara, Mexico, on December 10, 1903, (Note: Some early sources give Mexico City as his birth place.) the son of American soldier and newspaperman Victor Courtenay Lewis (1869–1945) and Spanish-born mother Marie De La Luz Garcia. His two younger brothers, Carrol and Victor Jr., became film editors. He moved with his family to Rio de Janeiro, Illinois, and Wisconsin before settling in the San Diego area, where Lewis graduated from Coronado High School in 1923.

== Career ==
He broke into films in the 1920s, and his handsome presence led to leading roles in a Universal Pictures short-subject series, The Collegians. He also played supporting roles in Educational Pictures shorts.

Most of Lewis's screen work was in low-budget films, although he can be seen in a few major productions (in Casablanca he's an Arab peddler with a monkey). Some of his roles were sympathetic; he played the male leads in the 1944 serial Zorro's Black Whip and in the Vera Vague comedy shorts of the 1940s. Usually, George J. Lewis played villains in westerns and serials, chiefly at Republic Pictures. Cast as a sinister henchman, Lewis would carry out the villain's diabolical orders, setting death traps and ambushes week after week. The high point of Lewis's serial career was probably the 1945 Republic cliffhanger Federal Operator 99, in which he was the full-fledged villain of the piece, playing "Moonlight Sonata" on a piano while plotting crimes. Holding the heroine captive, the nonchalant Lewis asks the hero: "What will it be? Cash for me... or incineration for Miss Kingston?" He appeared in Three Stooges films as Vernon Dent's knife-wielding conspirator in the Stooge short Malice in the Palace, and its remake, Rumpus in the Harem. He was also featured with the Stooges (as George Lewis) in Hollywood's final two-reel comedy release, Sappy Bull Fighters.

Many low-budget filmmakers scored successes in early television, and many familiar faces turned up in half-hour action fare.

Lewis appeared in the first two episodes of The Lone Ranger which were "Enter the Lone Ranger" and "The Lone Ranger Fights On". He was a villain ("Collins") who helped betray a group of Texas Rangers and led them all into a deadly ambush, with the series' star, of course, being the lone survivor. He played an American Indian in an Adventures of Superman episode called "Test of a Warrior."

Lewis was cast as General Mariano Guadalupe Vallejo in the 1956 episode, "The Bear Flag" of the syndicated anthology series, Death Valley Days, hosted by Stanley Andrews. The episode explains the tensions in 1846 between established Hispanic families in California and the newly arrived white settlers from the United States. General Vallejo seeks accommodation with the forces headed by Ezekiel "Stuttering Zeke" Merritt (Don C. Harvey) in establishing the short-term Bear Flag Republic.

Lewis continued to work in dozens of television episodes, including Daniel Boone & Cheyenne, until he retired in 1969.

== Later years ==
Lewis died of a stroke at his home in Rancho Santa Fe, California, in 1995, two days before his 92nd birthday.

== Selected filmography ==
- The Spanish Dancer (1923) - (uncredited)
- Code of the Sea (1924) - Party Guest (uncredited)
- Captain Blood (1924) - Henri d'Ogeron
- Three Women (1924) - College Boy (uncredited)
- The Lady Who Lied (1925) - Mahmud
- Sherlock Sleuth (1925) - Party Boy (uncredited)
- His People (1925) - Sammy Cominsky
- Devil's Island (1926) - Léon Valyon
- The Old Soak (1926) - Clemmy Hawley
- The Collegians (1926) - Ed Benson
- Benson at Calford (1926) - Ed Benson
- Fighting to Win (1926) - Ed Benson
- Making Good (1926) - Ed Benson
- The Last Lap (1926) - Ed Benson
- Around the Bases (1927) - Ed Benson
- The Fighting Spirit (1927) - Ed Benson
- The Relay (1927) - Ed Benson
- The Cinder Path (1927) - Ed Benson
- Flashing Oars (1927) - Ed Benson
- Breaking Records (1927) - Ed Benson
- Crimson Colors (1927) - Ed Benson
- The Winning Five (1927) - Ed Benson
- The Dazzling Co-Ed (1927) - Ed Benson
- A Fighting Finish (1927) - Ed Benson
- Samson at Calford (1927) - Ed Benson
- The Winning Punch (1927) - Ed Benson
- The Fourflusher (1928) - Andy Wittaker
- 13 Washington Square (1928) - Jack De Peyster
- Honeymoon Flats (1928) - Jim Clayton
- We Americans (1928) - Phil Levine
- Jazz Mad (1928) - Leopold Ostberg
- Give and Take (1928) - 'Jack' Bauer Jr.
- College Love (1929) - Robert Wilson
- Tonight at Twelve (1929) - Tony Keith
- En nombre de la amistad (1930)
- El último de los Vargas (1930) - José Vargas
- La gran jornada (1931) - Raul Coleman
- Cuerpo y alma (1931) - Ted
- Marido y mujer (1932) - Eddie Collins
- South of the Rio Grande (1932) - Corporal Ramon Ruiz
- Águilas frente al sol (1932) - Frank Richardson
- A Parisian Romance (1932) - Pierre
- The Heart Punch (1932) - Lefty Doyle
- Call Her Savage (1932) - Party Guest (uncredited)
- The Whispering Shadow (1933, Serial) - Bud Foster [Ch.1, 8] (uncredited)
- Her Resale Value (1933) - Dr. Ted Harris
- The Wolf Dog (1933) - Bob Whitlock
- No dejes la puerta abierta (1933) - Darmant
- The Pecos Dandy (1934) - The Pecos Dandy
- Lazy River (1934) - Armand Lescalle
- Allez Oop (1934) - The Great Apollo
- Two Heads on a Pillow (1934) - Anthony Populopulini
- The Merry Widow (1934) - Escort (uncredited)
- Red Morning (1934) - Mao
- Storm Over the Andes (1935) - Garcia
- The Headline Woman (1935) - O'Shay, Reporter
- Under the Pampas Moon (1935) - Aviator
- Alas sobre El Chaco (1935) - El operador de la radio
- The Fighting Marines (1935, Serial) - Sgt. William Schiller [Chs. 1-4]
- Captain Calamity (1936) - Pierre
- El capitan Tormenta (1936) - Pedro
- Dummy Ache (1936) - The Actor
- Ride Ranger Ride (1936) - Lieutenant Bob Cameron
- El carnaval del diablo (1936)
- Back Door to Heaven (1939) - Bob Hale
- Di que me quieres (1939) - Carlos Madero
- Man of Conquest (1939) - Man at Tennessee Rally (uncredited)
- Beware Spooks! (1939) - Danny Emmett
- The Middleton Family at the New York World's Fair (1939) - Nicholas Makaroff
- Outside the Three-Mile Limit (1940) - Ed Morrow
- Men Against the Sky (1940) - Lt. Norval (uncredited)
- They Met in Argentina (1941) - Reporter at the Racetrack (uncredited)
- The Get-Away (1941) - Hoodlum in Montage (uncredited)
- Kansas Cyclone (1941) - Undetermined Secondary Role (uncredited)
- It Started with Eve (1941) - Maitre d' (uncredited)
- Death Valley Outlaws (1941) - Bank Teller (uncredited)
- Outlaws of the Desert (1941) - Yussuf
- No Hands on the Clock (1941) - Dave Paulson
- Riders of the Badlands (1941) - Henchman Kirk (uncredited)
- Road Agent (1941) - Henchman Lace (uncredited)
- Gang Busters (1942, Serial) - Joey Morrison - aka Mason
- Spy Smasher (1942, Serial) - Stuart, Warehouse Spy [Ch. 8] (uncredited)
- Perils of Nyoka (1942) - Batan, Arab Henchman
- A Yank in Libya (1942) - Sheik Ibrahim
- Halfway to Shanghai (1942) - Brakeman (uncredited)
- Sin Town (1942) - Oil Man (uncredited)
- Phantom Killer (1942) - Kramer
- The Falcon's Brother (1942) - Valdez
- Outlaws of Pine Ridge (1942) - Henchman Ross
- Casablanca (1942) - Haggling Arab Monkey Seller (uncredited)
- G-Men vs the Black Dragon (1943, Serial) - Lugo
- They Got Me Covered (1943) - Foreign Correspondent (uncredited)
- The Blocked Trail (1943) - Freddy
- Flesh and Fantasy (1943) - Harlequin (uncredited)
- Daredevils of the West (1943) - Turner - Henchman
- Batman (1943, Serial) - Henchman Burke (uncredited)
- Secret Service in Darkest Africa (1943, Serial) - Kaba [Ch.9] (uncredited)
- The Masked Marvel (1943) - Philip Morton (uncredited)
- Black Hills Express (1943) - Henchman Vic Fowler
- The Texas Kid (1943) - Murdered Stage Driver
- Tarzan's Desert Mystery (1943) - Ali Baba Hassan (uncredited)
- The Impostor (1944) - Soldier (uncredited)
- Captain America (1944, Serial) - Bart Matson
- Charlie Chan in the Secret Service (1944) - Paul Arranto
- The Laramie Trail (1944) - John Emerson, aka Blackie Mason
- The Tiger Woman (1944) - Morgan
- The Desert Hawk (1944, Serial) - Captain of Emir's Bodyguard (uncredited)
- Raiders of Ghost City (1944) - Fred (uncredited)
- The Falcon in Mexico (1944) - Domingo (uncredited)
- Haunted Harbor (1944) - Dranga
- Oh, What a Night (1944) - Rocco
- Shadow of Suspicion (1944) - Paul Randall
- Black Arrow (1944, Serial) - Snake-That-Walks
- Zorro's Black Whip (1944) - Vic Gordon
- Brazil (1944) - Messenger (uncredited)
- Can't Help Singing (1944) - Cavalry Officer (uncredited)
- Federal Operator 99 (1945, Serial) - Jim Belmont
- The White Gorilla (1945) - Hutton
- Lady on a Train (1945) - Reporter (uncredited)
- The Gay Senorita (1945) - Torreon (uncredited)
- South of the Rio Grande (1945) - Miguel Sanchez
- Mexicana (1945) - Caballero
- Wagon Wheels Westward (1945) - Lunsford
- Song of Mexico (1945) - Arturo Martinez
- Tarzan and the Leopard Woman (1946) - Corporal (uncredited)
- Because of Him (1946) - Reporter (uncredited)
- The Phantom Rider (1946, Serial) - Blue Feather
- Gilda (1946) - Huerta (uncredited)
- Perilous Holiday (1946) - Florist (uncredited)
- The Gay Cavalier (1946) - Wedding Guest (uncredited)
- Rainbow Over Texas (1946) - Jim Pollard
- Passkey to Danger (1946) - Julian Leighton
- South of Monterey (1946) - Carlos Mandreno
- The Missing Lady (1946) - Jan Field
- Under Nevada Skies (1946) - Chief Flying Eagle
- The Thrill of Brazil (1946) - Bartender in Production Number (uncredited)
- Beauty and the Bandit (1946) - Capitan
- Twilight on the Rio Grande (1947) - Captain Gonzáles
- Web of Danger (1947) - Masher at Restaurant (uncredited)
- Slave Girl (1947) - Dialogue Captive Sailor (segment "He's in the same boat we are', etc.) (uncredited)
- Blackmail (1947) - Blue Chip Winslow
- The Wistful Widow of Wagon Gap (1947) - Cowpuncher (uncredited)
- Pirates of Monterey (1947) - Pirate (uncredited)
- The Woman from Tangier (1948) - Albert Franz - the Pilot (uncredited)
- To the Ends of the Earth (1948) - Ship's Cook Who Is Lying About Fire (uncredited)
- Docks of New Orleans (1948) - Police Sgt. Dansiger
- Oklahoma Blues (1948) - Henchman Slip Drago
- Casbah (1948) - Detective (uncredited)
- Lulu Belle (1948) - Capt. Ralph (uncredited)
- One Touch of Venus (1948) - Detective #2 (uncredited)
- Silver Trails (1948) - José Esteban
- Tap Roots (1948) - Confederate (uncredited)
- The Sheriff of Medicine Bow (1948) - Henchman Buckeye
- The Gallant Blade (1948) - Servant (uncredited)
- Adventures of Frank and Jesse James (1948) - Rafe Henley
- Renegades of Sonora (1948) - Chief Eagle Claw
- The Feathered Serpent (1948) - Capt. Juan Gonzalez
- Crashing Thru (1949) - Henchman Jarvis
- Shockproof (1949) - Border Patrolman (uncredited)
- The Big Sombrero (1949) - Juan Vazcaro
- Ghost of Zorro (1949) - Moccasin
- The Lost Tribe (1949) - Steve 'Whip' Wilson
- Malice in the Palace (1949) - Ginna Rumma
- Prison Warden (1949) - Yardbird Refusing Quarry Work (uncredited)
- Bandits of El Dorado (1949) - Colonel José Vargas
- The Dalton Gang (1949) - Chief Irahu
- Radar Patrol vs. Spy King (1949) - Lt. Manuel Agura
- Captain Carey, U.S.A. (1950) - Giovanni
- Buccaneer's Girl (1950) - Sailor (uncredited)
- Hostile Country (1950) - Jim Knowlton - the Oliver imposter
- One Way Street (1950) - Capt. Rodriguez
- Cody of the Pony Express (1950) - Mortimer Black
- Marshal of Heldorado (1950) - Nate Tulliver
- Crooked River (1950) - Deke Gentry
- Colorado Ranger (1950) - Henchman Tony
- West of the Brazos (1950) - Manuel
- Fast on the Draw (1950) - Henchman Pedro
- Crisis (1950) - Hotel Desk Clerk (uncredited)
- Branded (1950) - Andy (uncredited)
- Southside 1-1000 (1950) - Gornoy
- King of the Bullwhip (1950) - Henchman Rio
- Short Grass (1950) - Diego
- Al Jennings of Oklahoma (1951) - Sammy Page
- The Sword of Monte Cristo (1951) - Conspirator (uncredited)
- Abbott and Costello Meet the Invisible Man (1951) - Torpedo Al (uncredited)
- Saddle Legion (1951) - Mexican Police Captain
- Appointment with Danger (1951) - Leo Cronin
- The Golden Horde (1951) - Noyou (uncredited)
- South of Caliente (1951) - Gypsy Henchman (uncredited)
- The Kid from Amarillo (1951) - Don José Figaroa
- Red Mountain (1951) - Quantrell Man
- Thunder in the East (1951) - Bartender (uncredited)
- Viva Zapata! (1952) - Rurale (uncredited)
- Hold That Line (1952) - Mike Donelli
- Wagon Team (1952) - Carlos de la Torre
- The Raiders (1952) - Vicente
- The Prisoner of Zenda (1952) - Uhlan Guard at Hunting Lodge (uncredited)
- The Iron Mistress (1952) - Col. Wells
- The Bad and the Beautiful (1952) - 'Far Away Mountain' Test Actor #2 (uncredited)
- The Bandits of Corsica (1953) - Arturo
- Desert Legion (1953) - Lt. Lopez
- Shane (1953) - Ryker Man (uncredited)
- Cow Country (1953) - Sanchez
- Devil's Canyon (1953) - Colonel Jorge Gomez
- The Veils of Bagdad (1953) - Captain (uncredited)
- Border River (1954) - Sanchez
- Phantom of the Rue Morgue (1954) - Gendarme Duval (uncredited)
- Saskatchewan (1954) - Lawson
- Drum Beat (1954) - Capt. Alonzo Clark
- The Prodigal (1955) - Guard (uncredited)
- Davy Crockett (1955)
- Hell on Frisco Bay (1956) - Father Larocca
- Rumpus in the Harem (1956) - Ginna Rumma (archive footage)
- The First Texan (1956) - Mexican Military Doctor (uncredited)
- Santiago (1956) - Pablo
- A Cry in the Night (1956) - George Gerrity
- Lust for Life (1956) - Gendarme (uncredited)
- The Big Land (1957) - Dawson
- Jeanne Eagels (1957) - Foreman (uncredited)
- The Brothers Rico (1957) - El Camino Hotel Desk Clerk (uncredited)
- The Tall Stranger (1957) - Chavez
- Gunman's Walk (1958) - Cattleman (uncredited)
- Sappy Bull Fighters (1959) - Jose
- Guns of the Timberland (1960) - Jud (uncredited)
- The Comancheros (1961) - Chief Iron Shirt (uncredited)
- Kid Galahad (1962) - Romero's Trainer (uncredited)
- 7 Faces of Dr. Lao (1964) - Mr. Frisco (uncredited)
- Indian Paint (1965) - Nopawallo
- Batman (1966) - Spanish Delegate (uncredited)

== Selected television ==
Year	Title	Role	Notes	
1949	Lone Ranger	Collins		Season 1, Episode 1, "Enter the Lone Ranger"
1949	Lone Ranger	Collins		Season 1, Episode 2, "The Lone Ranger Fights On"
1955	Adventures of Superman	John Hancock		Season 3, Episode 6, "Test of a Warrior"
1953	Death Valley Days	Mariano Guadalupe Vallejo	Season 5, Episode "The Bear Flag"	
1964-1966	Daniel Boone		3 episodes	
1957-1958	Cheyenne		2 episodes	
1957-1961	Zorro	Don Alejandro de la Vega. Father of Don Diego de la Vega aka Zorro	42 episodes, Disney anthology television series	
