= Jaguar Productions (company) =

American film production company

Jaguar Productions was an American production company established by Alan Ladd in 1953. It produced several movies, most of them starring Ladd. The majority of the films were distributed by Warner Bros. Pictures.

"The principal difficulty, whether you take a salary from a studio or are in business for yourself, is finding the right story", said Ladd. "Once the story is set, the rest of the operation follows a pattern, so you may as well own a piece of the negative – even if you have to beg, borrow or steal to get your hands on it."

In 1957 Ladd claimed his movies usually cost $800,000 to $1 million and grossed around $3.5 million. That year Jaguar signed a contract with Warners to make ten films in three years with Ladd to appear in at least six. George C. Bertholon was his associate producer.

Albert J. Cohen later became executive producer. "Ladd and I know that we'll probably spend from nine to twelve million dollars on these films", says Cohen. "We know that the foundation of a successful film is its story values. And we're anxious to acquire properties that will give Ladd material that differs drastically from the type of script that has been his lot lately."

== Select Credits ==
- Drum Beat (1954)
- Hell on Frisco Bay (1955)
- A Cry in the Night (1956)*
- The Big Land (1957)
- The Deep Six (1958)
- The Man in the Net (1959)
- Island of Lost Women (1959)*
- Guns of the Timberland (1960)
- All the Young Men (1960) (for Columbia)

(*did not star Ladd)

=== Unmade Projects ===
- film version of Box 13 to be written by Charles Bennett – a TV series of this was also mooted
- Farewell to Kennedy – proposed TV series based on an episode of an anthology drama in which Ladd appeared
- TV series Ivy League starring William Bendix about an army sergeant who attends an ivy league university for which a pilot was shot in 1958
- Japanese Eye – original screenplay by Thelma Schnee set in modern-day Tokyo
- untitled film by Lou Stevens about the cattle business in Hawaii
- The Strangers based on novel by Max Ehlrich
- untitled project starring Ladd and his son David for producer Robert Radnitz set during the Johnson County Wars
- Off the City Streets from a novel by Lester Atwell about juvenile delinquent children who find new homes in a privileged suburb – a vehicle for David Ladd
- The Cavalryman
- "The Third Platoon" for G.E. Theatre
- Baggy Pants a film based on the life of Bert Lahr
- Without Rhyme or Reason a film based on the life of L. Wolfe Gilbert
- The Thunder and the Rain – a "romance in a desert setting"
- a remake of The Covered Wagon with director Michael Curtiz
