= Phantom of the Rue Morgue =

1954 film by Roy Del Ruth

- Theatrical poster.
- Directed by: Roy Del Ruth
- Screenplay by: Harold Medford; James R. Webb
- Based on: The Murders in the Rue Morgue; 1841 story in Graham's Magazine by Edgar Allan Poe
- Produced by: Henry Blanke
- Starring: Karl Malden; Claude Dauphin; Patricia Medina
- Cinematography: J. Peverell Marley
- Edited by: James Moore
- Music by: David Buttolph
- Production company: Warner Bros. Pictures
- Distributed by: Warner Bros. Pictures
- Release date: March 27, 1954
- Running time: 83 minutes
- Country: United States
- Language: English
- Box office: $1,450,000 (US)

Phantom of the Rue Morgue is a 1954 American mystery horror film directed by Roy Del Ruth and starring Karl Malden, Claude Dauphin, Patricia Medina and Steve Forrest. The film is an adaptation of Edgar Allan Poe's 1841 short story The Murders in the Rue Morgue.

Warner Bros. Pictures released several 3D productions during the 1950s, including the big-budget The Charge at Feather River (1953). Following another western, The Moonlighter (1953), starring Barbara Stanwyck and Fred MacMurray, the studio attempted to repeat the success they had with House of Wax the previous year. This movie was based on the same story which had formed the basis of a 1932 horror film which stars Bela Lugosi.

== Plot ==
In 1870s France, a string of strange murders occur on the Rue Morgue, a fictional street in Paris. The authorities are baffled, but they do know of one man who may have the answers - a professor named Dupin.

Dupin agrees to help the police. Soon a list of suspects is established. The roster includes a one-eyed sailor named Jacques. But there is also Professor Marais, who is involved in bizarre and unauthorized animal experiments.

== Cast ==
- Karl Malden as Dr. Marais
- Claude Dauphin as Insp. Bonnard
- Patricia Medina as Jeanette
- Steve Forrest as Prof. Paul Dupin
- Allyn Ann McLerie as Yvonne
- Anthony Caruso as Jacques the One-Eyed
- Veola Vonn as Arlette
- Dolores Dorn as Camille
- Merv Griffin as Georges Brevert
- Paul Richards as Rene the Knife-thrower
- Rolfe Sedan as LeBon
- Erin O'Brien-Moore as Wardrobe Woman
- Charles Gemora as Sultan, The Gorilla
- The Flying Zacchinis as Themselves
- Tito Vuolo as Pignatelli
- Marie Blake as Marie
- Henry Kulky as Maurice, Sailor
- Leonard Penn as Gendarme Dumas
- Frank Lackteen as Gendarme Chavet
- George J. Lewis as Gendarme Duval
- Rico Alaniz as Gendarme
- Belle Mitchell as Concierge
- Creighton Hale as Concierge's Husband

== Home media ==
Sometime in 2026, Warner Archive will release this on 3-D Blu-ray, released from the Left Eye and Right Eye Camera Negatives.

== Bibliography ==
- Aitken, Stuart C. & Zonn, Leo E. Place, Power, Situation and Spectacle: A Geography of Film. Rowman & Littlefield Publishers, 1994.
- Palmer, Barton R. Nineteenth-Century American Fiction on Screen. Cambridge University Press, 2007.
