= Anthony Caruso (actor) =

American actor (1916–2003)

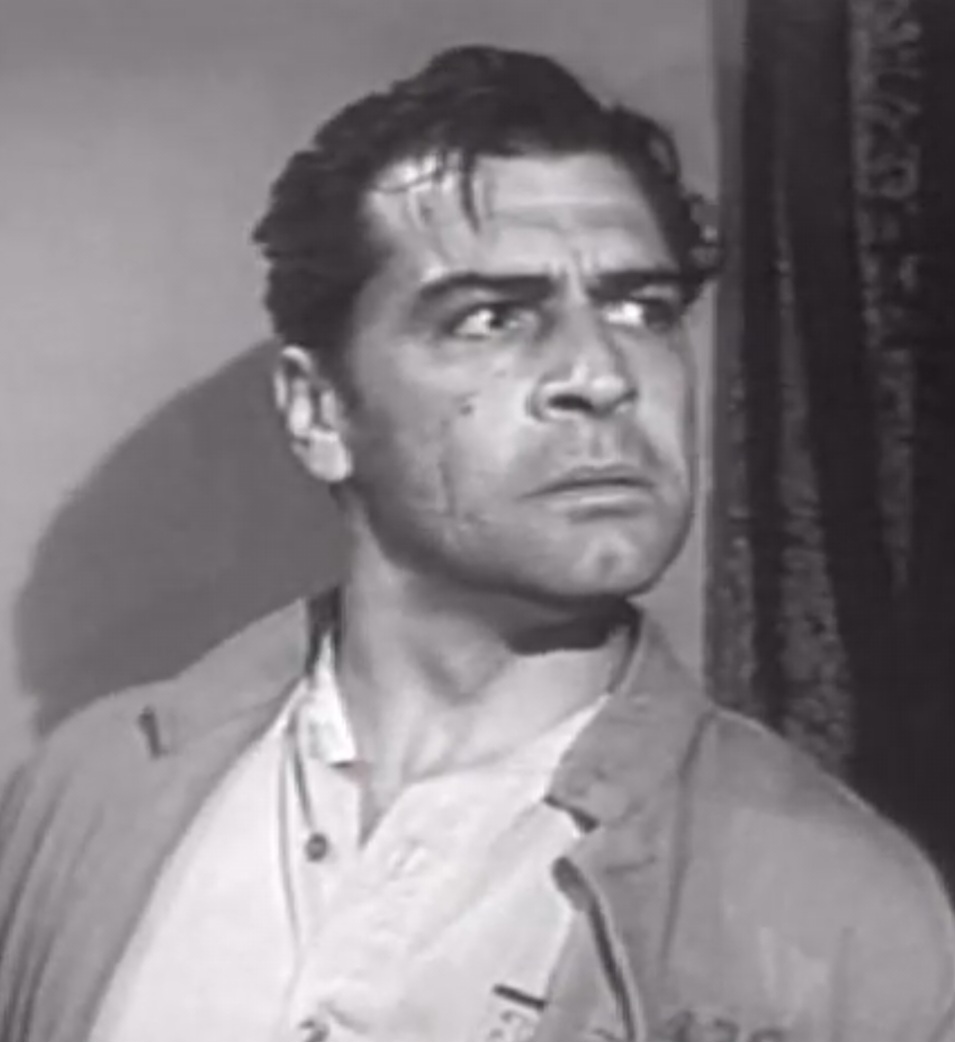
- Caruso in an episode of The Public Defender (1955)
- Born: April 7, 1916; Frankfort, Indiana, U.S.
- Died: April 4, 2003 (aged 86); Brentwood, Los Angeles, California, U.S.
- Occupations: Film, television actor
- Years active: 1940–1990
- Spouse: Tonia Valente (m. 1940)
- Children: 2

Anthony Caruso (April 7, 1916 – April 4, 2003) was an American character actor in more than one hundred American films. He was known for his villains and gangsters, including the first season of Walt Disney's Zorro as Captain Juan Ortega, and in numerous films noirs.

== Early life ==
Caruso was born in Frankfort, Indiana to Italian-American parents.

== Career ==
While acting at the Pasadena Playhouse, he met Alan Ladd, beginning a friendship that continued as they made 11 films together.

Caruso's early acting experience included performing with The Hart Players, a stock theater company that presented tent shows. He also acted with the Federal Theatre Project and was a star in plays at the Hollywood Playhouse.

He made his film debut in Henry Hathaway's Johnny Apollo (1940) starring Tyrone Power. He is best known for his numerous portrayals of gangsters and villains in film noir, including Incident (1948), The Undercover Man (1949), Scene of the Crime (1949), and The Asphalt Jungle (1950).

Moving to television, Caruso played Tiburcio Vásquez in a 1954 episode of the Western series Stories of the Century. He appeared in the first Brian Keith series, Crusader. Among Caruso's other Western credits was 1954's Cattle Queen of Montana starring Barbara Stanwyck and Ronald Reagan. In 1957, he appeared in the fourth episode of the first season of the TV Western Have Gun – Will Travel starring Richard Boone titled "The Winchester Quarantine".

In 1956 Caruso appeared as Disalin with war hero Audie Murphy, Charles Drake and Anne Bancroft in Walk the Proud Land.

In 1957, Caruso appeared in episode "The Child" on NBC's The Restless Gun. In 1959, he was cast as George Bradley in the episode "Annie's Old Beau" on the NBC children's Western series, Buckskin.

That same year, he portrayed Matt Cleary on CBS's Wanted: Dead or Alive episode "The Littlest Client", with Steve McQueen. Also 1959, he also guest-starred on the ABC/Warner Brothers Western series, Sugarfoot, in the episode "The Extra Hand", along with guest stars Karl Swenson and Jack Lambert as well as the series star, Will Hutchins. The same year he appeared in the 'Syndicate Sanctuary' episode of The Untouchables.

In 1960, Caruso played a Cherokee Indian, Chief White Bull, in the episode "The Long Trail" of the NBC Western series, Riverboat, starring Darren McGavin.

Caruso played a cowboy named Gurney on Gunsmoke in "Shooting Stopover" in 1960. He also played "Lone Wolf" in a 1961 episode entitled "Indian Ford". He returned in 1962, playing Cody Durham in "Cody's Code". In 1963 he played the title character "Ash Farior", in a performance outside of his normal roles, partnering with & befriending "Ben" (John Dehner), where the latter has an accident that disrupts his brain, and Caruso shows his friend sympathy, love, patience, care & loyalty.

In 1961, he appeared twice on the ABC/Warner Brothers drama series, The Roaring 20s, including the role of Lucky Lombardi in "The Maestro". He was also cast with Will Hutchins in a second The Roaring 20s episode entitled, "Pie in the Sky." Early in 1961, he was cast as Velde in the episode "Willy's Millionaire" of the short-lived ABC adventure series, The Islanders, with Diane Brewster.

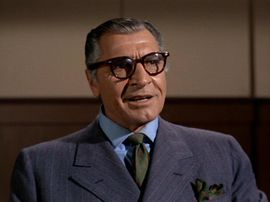
Anthony Caruso as Bela Oxmyx in Star Trek: "A Piece of the Action"

Caruso guest-starred in an episode of the ABC Western series, The Travels of Jaimie McPheeters, based on a Robert Lewis Taylor novel of the same name. Caruso guest-starred three times on CBS's Perry Mason. In 1962, he played Keith Lombard in "The Case of the Playboy Pugilist." In 1965, he made two Perry Mason appearances, both times as the murder victim: first as title character Enrico Bacio in "The Case of the Sad Sicilian," then as Harvey Rettig in "The Case of the Runaway Racer."

In 1964, he guest-starred in the Bonanza episode "The Saga of Squaw Charlie" playing a Native American man shunned by almost everybody and with only two friends, Ben Cartwright and a little girl named Angela. In 1964 he played "Sims", a surly cowboy in "Father's Love", as well as "Bull Foot" in a semi-comedic role in the episode "The Warden". In 1969 he starred alongside Ricardo Montalbán in The Desperate Mission, a fictionalized telling of the life of Joaquin Murrieta. From 1966 to 1970 he guest-starred three times on the long-running NBC Western The Virginian, starring James Drury. In 1965 he guest-starred on ABC's The Addams Family as Don Xavier Molinas.

Some of his other roles were that of the alien gangster "Bela Oxmyx" in the classic Star Trek episode "A Piece of the Action", Chief Blackfish on the NBC series Daniel Boone, Mongo in the film Tarzan and the Leopard Woman, Sengo in Tarzan and the Slave Girl, and Louis Ciavelli (the "box man" or safecracker) in The Asphalt Jungle. Caruso played the comical character of the Native American "Red Cloud" on the 1965 Get Smart episode "Washington 4, Indians 3," and Chief Angry Bear in the episode "You Can't Scalp a Bald Indian" of Rango.

In 1970, Caruso made a guest appearance on the ABC crime drama The Silent Force in the episode "A Family Tradition." In 1974, he appeared in the final episode, entitled "The Fire Dancer," of the ABC police drama Nakia. Caruso also had a recurring roll as El Lobo on The High Chaparral.

== Personal life and death ==
Caruso met his future wife, Tonia at the Alcazar Theater in 1939 in San Francisco, when the play she was in was closing and the play he was in was opening. Caruso was married for 63 years. He enjoyed gardening and cooking.

On April 4, 2003, Caruso died at age 86 at his home in Los Angeles, California, three days before his 87th birthday.

== Selected filmography ==
1. Johnny Apollo (1940) as Joe – Henchman
2. The Bride Wore Crutches (1940) as Max
3. North West Mounted Police (1940) as Half-breed at Riel's HQ (uncredited)
4. The Devil's Pipeline (1940) as Natoni – Henchman (uncredited)
5. Tall, Dark and Handsome (1941) as Gunman
6. The Corsican Brothers (1941) as Baron's Henchman (uncredited)
7. You're in the Army Now (1941) as Apache Dancer (uncredited)
8. Always in My Heart (1942) as Frank
9. Sunday Punch (1942) as Nat Cucci
10. Across the Pacific (1942) as Taxi Driver (uncredited)
11. Lucky Jordan (1942) as Hired Gun
12. The Ghost and the Guest (1943) as Henchman Ted
13. Above Suspicion (1943) as Italian Border Sentry (uncredited)
14. Jitterbugs (1943) as Mike (uncredited)
15. Watch on the Rhine (1943) as Italian Man
16. The Girl from Monterrey (1943) as Alberto 'Baby' Valdez
17. The Phantom (1943, Serial) as Count Silento (uncredited)
18. Whistling in Brooklyn (1943) as Henchman Fingers (uncredited)
19. The Racket Man (1944) as Tony Ciccardi (uncredited)
20. The Story of Dr. Wassell (1944) as Pharmacist's Mate on 'Marblehead' (uncredited)
21. U-Boat Prisoner (1944) as Benny, Seaman's Union Hall Man (uncredited)
22. Maisie Goes to Reno (1944) as George – Blackjack Dealer (uncredited)
23. The Conspirators (1944) as Fisherman (uncredited)
24. And Now Tomorrow (1944) as Peter Gallo (uncredited)
25. Objective, Burma! (1945) as Miggleori (uncredited)
26. The Crime Doctor's Courage (1945) as Miguel Bragga
27. Don Juan Quilligan (1945) as One Eyed Barton (uncredited)
28. Pride of the Marines (1945) as Johnny Rivers
29. Star in the Night (1945) Jas osé Santos (as Tony Caruso)
30. I Love a Bandleader (1945) as Tony Ramon, Bandleader at El Caro (uncredited)
31. That Night with You (1945) as Tenor (uncredited)
32. The Stork Club (1945) as Joe – Fisherman (uncredited)
33. Tarzan and the Leopard Woman (1946) as Mongo
34. To Each His Own (1946) as Mobster (uncredited)
35. Night Editor (1946) as Tusco (uncredited)
36. The Blue Dahlia (1946) as Marine Corporal Playing Jukebox (uncredited)
37. The Catman of Paris (1946) as Raoul
38. Don't Gamble with Strangers (1946) as Pinky Luiz
39. The Last Crooked Mile (1946) as Charlie – Gang Member
40. Monsieur Beaucaire (1946) as Masked Horseman (uncredited)
41. My Favorite Brunette (1947) as First Man on Death Row (uncredited)
42. They Won't Believe Me (1947) as Tough Patient (uncredited)
43. News Hounds (1947) as Dapper Dan Greco
44. Wild Harvest (1947) as Pete
45. Escape Me Never (1947) as Dino Carbatto (uncredited)
46. Where There's Life (1947) as John Fulda
47. Devil Ship (1947) as Venetti
48. To the Victor (1948) as Nikki
49. Incident (1948) as Nails
50. Song of India (1949) as Major Doraj
51. Bride of Vengeance (1949) as Captain of the Guard
52. The Undercover Man (1949) as Salvatore Rocco
53. Illegal Entry (1949) as Teague
54. Anna Lucasta (1949) as Eddie
55. Scene of the Crime (1949) as Tony Rutzo
56. The Threat (1949) as Nick Damon
57. The Asphalt Jungle (1950) as Louis Ciavelli
58. Tarzan and the Slave Girl (1950) as Sengo
59. Prisoners in Petticoats (1950) as Nicky Bowman
60. According to Mrs. Hoyle (1951) as Morganti
61. His Kind of Woman (1951) as Tony (uncredited)
62. Pals of the Golden West (1951) as Lucky Grillo aka Jim Bradford
63. Boots Malone (1952) as Joe
64. Desert Pursuit (1952) as Hassan
65. The Iron Mistress (1952) as Black Jack Sturdevant
66. Blackbeard the Pirate (1952) as Pierre La Garde
67. Adventures of Superman (1953) as Luigi Dinelli
68. The Man Behind the Gun (1953) as Vic Sutro
69. Desert Legion (1953) as Lt. Massaoud
70. Raiders of the Seven Seas (1953) as Renzo
71. Fort Algiers (1953) as Chavez
72. The Steel Lady (1953) as Zagora
73. Fighter Attack (1953) as Aldo
74. The Boy from Oklahoma (1954) as Barney Turlock
75. Saskatchewan (1954) as Spotted Eagle
76. Phantom of the Rue Morgue (1954) as Jacques the One-Eyed
77. Passion (1954) as Sergeant Muñoz
78. Drum Beat (1954) as Manok
79. Cattle Queen of Montana (1954) as Natchakoa
80. Santa Fe Passage (1955) as Chavez
81. The Magnificent Matador (1955) as Emiliano
82. City of Shadows (1955) as Tony Finetti
83. Jail Busters (1955) as Percival P. Lannigan
84. Tennessee's Partner (1955) as Turner
85. Toughest Man Alive (1955) as Pete Gore
86. Hell on Frisco Bay (1956) as Sebastian Pasmonick
87. When Gangland Strikes (1956) as Duke Martella
88. Walk the Proud Land (1956) as Disalin
89. A Cry in the Night (1956) as Tony Chavez
90. The Big Land (1957) as Brog
91. Have Gun - Will Travel (1957, Episode: "Winchester Quarantine") as Joseph Whitehorse
92. The Oklahoman (1957) as Jim Hawk
93. The Lawless Eighties (1957) as Wolf Chief
94. Omar Khayyam (1957) as Shah's Guard (uncredited)
95. Joe Dakota (1957) as Marcus Vizzini
96. Baby Face Nelson (1957) as John Hamilton
97. The Restless Gun (1957) as Father Basilico in "The Child" (Christmas episode)
98. Fort Massacre (1958) as Pawnee
99. The Badlanders (1958) as Comanche
100. Legion of the Doomed (1958) as Sgt. Calvelli
101. Never Steal Anything Small (1959) as Lt. Tevis
102. The Wonderful Country (1959) as Santiago Santos
103. Bonanza (1959, Episode: "The Paiute War") as Chief Winnemucca
104. Have Gun - Will Travel (1960, Episode: "Return to Fort Benjamin") as Gimp
105. Most Dangerous Man Alive (1961) as Andy Damon
106. Gunsmoke (1962, S7E17: "Cody's Code") as Cody
  Gunsmoke (1963, S8E23: "Ash" as Ash)
107. Escape from Zahrain (1964) as Tahar
108. Where Love Has Gone (1964) as Rafael
109. Sylvia (1965) as Muscles
110. Young Dillinger (1965) as Rocco
111. Perry Mason (1965, Episode: "The Sad Sicilian") as Enrico Bacio
112. Star Trek (1968, Episode: "A Piece of the Action") as Bela Okmyx
113. Never a Dull Moment (1968) as Tony Preston (uncredited)
114. Flap (1970) as Silver Dollar
115. Brother, Cry for Me (1970)
116. Eye for an Eye (1970)
117. Mission Impossible (1971) as Leonard Morgan
118. The Legend of Earl Durand (1974) as Sheriff Trask
119. Mean Johnny Barrows (1975) as Don Da Vince
120. Zebra Force (1976) as Salvatore Moreno
121. Mission to Glory: A True Story (1977) as Father Rodriguez
122. Claws (1977) as Henry
123. Hawaii Five-O (1978) "Invitation to Murder" as David Thorpe
124. Tierra sangrienta (1979)
125. Savage Harbor (1987) as Harry
126. The Legend of Grizzly Adams (1990) as Don Carlos (final film role)
