= David Buttolph =

American composer (1902–1983)

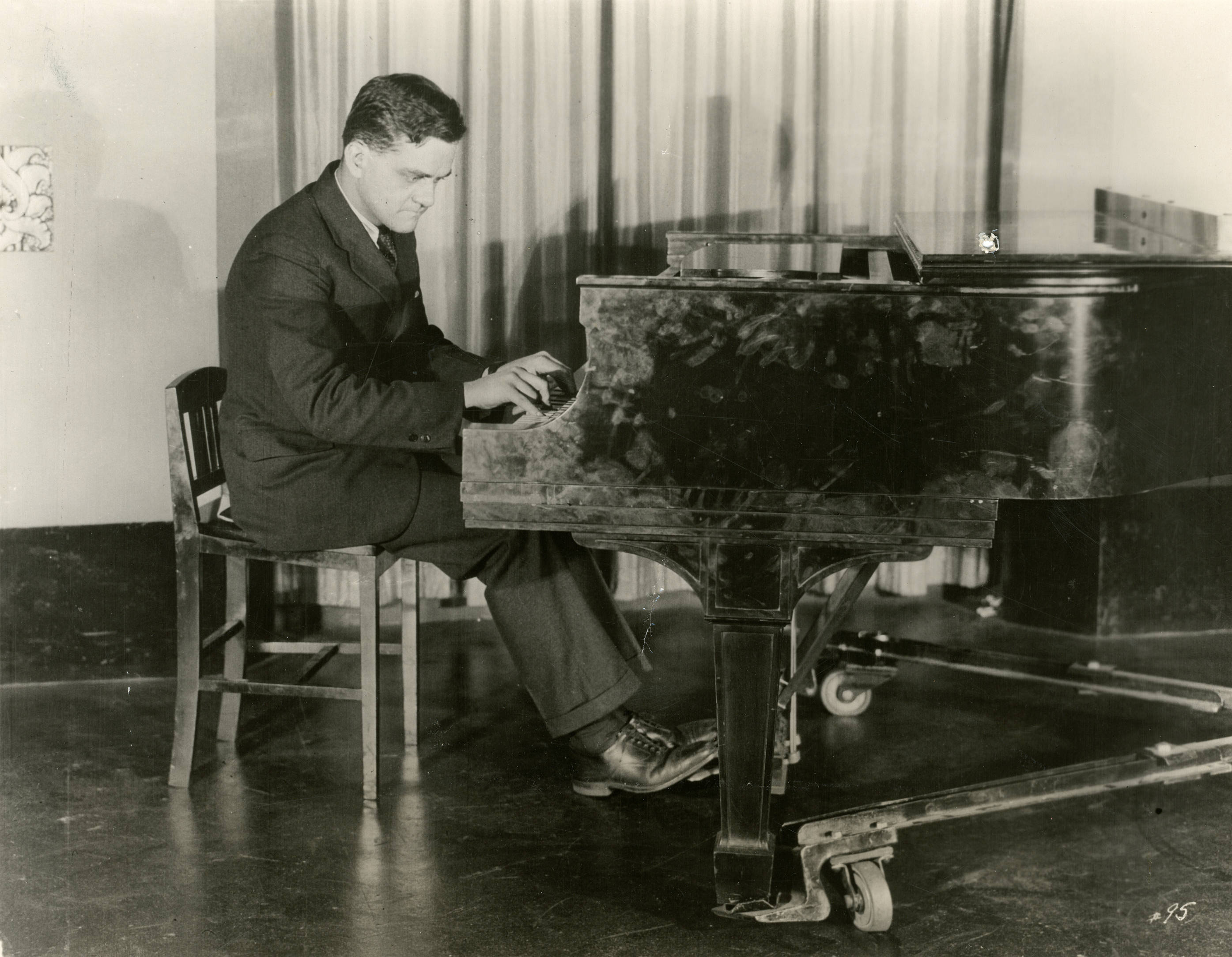
- Born: James David Buttolph, Jr. August 3, 1902; New York City, US
- Died: January 1, 1983 (aged 80); Poway, California, US
- Occupations: Actor, composer
- Years active: 1947–1978

James David Buttolph Jr. (August 3, 1902 – January 1, 1983) was an American film composer who scored over 300 movies in his career.

== Life and career ==
Born in New York City, Buttolph showed musical talent at an early age, and eventually studied music formally. After earning a music degree, Buttolph moved to Europe in 1923 and studied in Austria and Germany supporting himself as a nightclub pianist. He returned to the U.S. in 1927 and, a few years later, began working for NBC radio network as an arranger and conductor. In 1933, Buttolph moved to Los Angeles and began working in films. Buttolph's best work, according to many, was his work as an arranger on the Alfred Newman score for The Mark of Zorro (1940).

In the mid-1950s, Buttolph started to compose scores for television, the most memorable being the theme for the TV western Maverick starring James Garner with the same music appearing in his score of The Lone Ranger (1956). He continued to compose music for television, many of which were westerns, until his retirement in 1963.

== TV and filmography ==
- The New Maverick (1978) (TV) (theme song)
- The Man from Galveston (1963)
- PT 109 (1963)
- The Virginian (1962) TV Series
- Guns of the Timberland (1960)
- The Alaskans (1959) TV Series
- The Horse Soldiers (1959)
- Laramie (1959) TV Series
- Westbound (1959)
- 77 Sunset Strip (1958) TV Series
- Onionhead (1958)
- The Deep Six (1958)
- Shirley Temple's Storybook (1958) TV Series
- Maverick (1957) TV Series (theme)
- Wagon Train (1957) TV Series
- The D.I. (1957)
- The Big Land (1957)
- Conflict (1956) TV Series (also theme)
- Noah's Ark (1956) TV Series
- The Burning Hills (1956)
- The Lone Ranger (1956)
- A Cry in the Night (1956)
- Santiago (1956)
- The Steel Jungle (1956)
- I Died a Thousand Times (1955)
- Jump Into Hell (1955)
- Kings Row (1955) TV Series
- The Adventures of Long John Silver (1955) TV Series
- Secret of the Incas (1954)
- Riding Shotgun (1954)
- Phantom of the Rue Morgue (1954)
- The Bounty Hunter (1954)
- Crime Wave (1954)
- Thunder Over the Plains (1953)
- The Beast from 20,000 Fathoms (1953)
- South Sea Woman (1953)
- The System (1953)
- House of Wax (1953)
- The Man Behind the Gun (1953)
- My Man and I (1952)
- The Winning Team (1952)
- Carson City (1952)
- Talk About a Stranger (1952)
- This Woman Is Dangerous (1952)
- Lone Star (1952)
- Submarine Command (1951)
- Fighting Coast Guard (1951)
- The Enforcer (1951)
- Ten Tall Men (1951)
- Along the Great Divide (1951)
- Chain Lightning (1950)
- Montana (1950)
- Pretty Baby (1950)
- The Daughter of Rosie O'Grady (1950)
- Three Secrets (1950)
- Return of the Frontiersman (1950)
- Roseanna McCoy (1949)
- Look for the Silver Lining (1949)
- Story of Seabiscuit (1949)
- The Girl from Jones Beach (1949)
- One Sunday Afternoon (1949)
- John Loves Mary (1949)
- One Last Fling (1949)
- Colorado Territory (1949)
- June Bride (1948)
- Smart Girls Don't Talk (1948)
- To the Victor (1948)
- Kiss of Death (1947)
- The Foxes of Harrow (1947)
- Moss Rose (1947)
- Boomerang (1947)
- The Brasher Doubloon (1947)
- 13 Rue Madeleine (1946)
- Home Sweet Homicide (1946)
- It Shouldn't Happen to a Dog (1946)
- Somewhere in the Night (1946)
- Strange Triangle (1946)
- Johnny Comes Flying Home (1946)
- Shock (1946)
- The Spider (1945)
- The House on 92nd Street (1945)
- Within These Walls (1945)
- The Caribbean Mystery (1945)
- Junior Miss (1945)
- Nob Hill (1945)
- The Bullfighters (1945)
- Circumstantial Evidence (1945)
- The Big Noise (1944)
- Buffalo Bill (1944)
- Guadalcanal Diary (1943)
- Corvette K-225 (1943)
- Bomber's Moon (1943)
- Crash Dive (1943)
- Immortal Sergeant (1943)
- Thunder Birds (1942)
- Street of Chance (1942)
- Wake Island (1942)
- In Old California (1942)
- Moontide (1942)
- This Gun for Hire (1942)
- My Favorite Blonde (1942)
- Lady for a Night (1942)
- Bahama Passage (1941)
- Swamp Water (1941)
- Tobacco Road (1941)
- Star Dust (1940)
- Barricade (1939)
