= Martin Rackin =

American screenwriter

Martin Rackin (31 July 1918 – 15 April 1976) was an American writer and producer who was briefly head of production at Paramount Pictures from 1960 to 1964. In the late 1950s he wrote and produced a series of films with actor Alan Ladd.

Richard Fleischer described Rackin as "a real character. He was a fast-talking, breezy, nervous, con man type who blinked his eyes a lot. You always had the feeling that he was some sort of a street corner shell game operator keeping an eye open for the cops."

== Biography ==
Rackin was born in New York City. He worked as an errand boy for a Times Square hat shop. He became a reporter for the New York Daily Mirror and was a feature writer for two news services. He also worked as a speech writer and in publicity.

Rackin wrote a book, Buy Me That Town. Film rights to this were bought by Sol Siegel and Rackin moved to Hollywood. He served in the air force during World War II.

He wrote a sequel to Treasure Island, Long John Silver (1954), which was filmed in Australia along with a spin off TV series The Adventures of Long John Silver (1954–55). Rackin wrote most episodes.

=== Producer ===
Back in Hollywood Rackin wrote the story for Lisbon (1956).

He formed an alliance with Alan Ladd. He wrote several films for Ladd including Hell on Frisco Bay (1956), Santiago (1956), The Big Land (1957) and The Deep Six (1958). He produced several of these films. He also produced Top Secret Affair (1957), The Helen Morgan Story (1957), Darby's Rangers (1958), Fort Dobbs (1959), and The Barbarians (1960).

Rackin teamed up with John Lee Mahin. Both men wrote and produced The Horse Soldiers (1959) and North to Alaska (1960).

=== Paramount ===
In July 1960 Rackin was appointed supervisory chief of production at Paramount Studios, a position that had been vacant since Dan Hartman left in 1956. At the time Paramount were dominated by independent production units run by producers like Hal Wallis, George Seaton and Alfred Hitchcock. (All of whom would leave Paramount in the next few years.) It was thought Rackin's appointment might herald a return to the time when Paramount had more control over its productions. "We will make pictures that entertain", he said in August that year.

In 1962 he announced the studio would make "international family entertainment".

=== Post Paramount ===
After leaving his position as head of Paramount, Rackin turned into an independent producer. He signed a contract to make movies with Fox in December 1964.

His credits include Stagecoach (1966), Rough Night in Jericho (1967), The Great Sex War (1969), Two Mules for Sister Sara (1970) and The Revengers (1972). He also rewrote Two Mules.

In October 1972 Rackin was appointed vice president at Brut Productions. He was to oversee two films there, Hang Up and Miss 1000 Spring Blossoms.

Rackin set up a production company with Berle Adams. He was in London to set up a film when he died of a heart attack while sleeping at his room at the Grovesnor Hotel. He was survived by his wife Helen, a daughter and two grandchildren.

== Partial credits ==
- Buy Me That Town (1941) – writer
- Air Raid Wardens (1943) – writer
- Bombardier (1943) – original story
- Marine Raiders (1944) – original story
- Desperate (1947) – additional dialogue
- Riffraff (1947) – writer, original story
- Close-Up (1947) – writer
- Fighting Father Dunne (1948) – writer
- Race Street (1948) – writer
- Fighter Squadron (1948) – additional dialogue
- A Dangerous Profession (1949) – writer
- Three Secrets (1950) – writer
- The Enforcer (1951) – writer
- Distant Drums (1951) – writer
- The Stooge (1951) – writer
- Sailor Beware (1951) – writer
- Loan Shark (1952) – writer
- The Red Skelton Hour (1952–53) (TV series) – director
- The Clown (1953) – writer
- The Great Diamond Robbery (1954) – writer
- Long John Silver (1954) – writer
- The Adventures of Long John Silver (1954–55) (TV series) – writer
- Hell on Frisco Bay (1956) – writer
- Santiago (1956) – writer, original novel, producer
- Lisbon (1956) – story
- Top Secret Affair (1957) – producer
- The Helen Morgan Story (1957) – producer
- The Big Land (1957) – writer
- The Deep Six (1958) – writer, producer
- Darby's Rangers (1958) – producer
- Fort Dobbs (1959) – producer
- The Horse Soldiers (1959) – writer, producer
- The Barbarians (1960) aka Revak the Rebel – writer, producer
- North to Alaska (1960) – writer
- Stagecoach (1966) – producer
- Rough Night in Jericho (1967) – producer
- The Great Sex War (1969) – producer
- Two Mules for Sister Sara (1970) – producer
- The Revengers (1972) – producer
- Twice in a Lifetime (1974) – writer, producer
- Hangup (1974) – producer
- Nevada Smith (1975) – writer, producer
- Flo's Place (1976) (TV series) – executive producer

=== Films Made While Rackin Head of Paramount ===
- The Man Who Shot Liberty Valance (1962)
- Hatari! (1962)
- Man's Favorite Sport? (1964)
