= Saskatchewan (film) =

1954 film by Raoul Walsh

- Theatrical release poster by Reynold Brown
- Directed by: Raoul Walsh
- Written by: Gil Doud
- Based on: story by Gil Doud
- Produced by: Aaron Rosenberg
- Starring: Alan Ladd; Shelley Winters; J. Carrol Naish
- Cinematography: John F. Seitz
- Edited by: Frank Gross
- Music by: Uncredited: William Lava; Henry Mancini; Hans J. Salter; Frank Skinner; Herman Stein
- Color process: Technicolor
- Production company: Universal Pictures
- Distributed by: Universal Pictures
- Release date: March 30, 1954
- Running time: 87 minutes
- Country: United States
- Language: English
- Box office: $2.25 million (US); 1,667,136 admissions (France)

Saskatchewan (titled O'Rourke of the Royal Mounted in the UK) is a 1954 American Northern adventure film directed by Raoul Walsh and starring Alan Ladd, Shelley Winters and J. Carrol Naish. It was produced and distributed by Universal Pictures. The title refers to Fort Saskatchewan in present-day Alberta, Canada. Shooting took place in Banff National Park not far from the headwaters of the Saskatchewan River.

== Plot ==
North-West Mounted Police Sub-Inspector O'Rourke and his Cree brother Cajou are returning from a trapping trip in northern Canada when they encounter a burned wagon train and sole survivor Grace Markey. They brought Miss Markey with them to their fort in Saskatchewan. At their fort, O'Rourke meets for the first time the new post commander Inspector Benton (recently arrived from England) who gave an order to confiscate all the rifles of the Crees. O'Rourke was unaware of this order since it was given when he was away on his trapping trip. When Inspector Benton saw Cajou carrying a rifle, he orders O'Rourke to confiscate the rifle of Cajou. O'Rourke initially refused to follow the order of his superior explaining that he personally gave the rifle to Cajou. When O'Rourke eventually followed the order and took the rifle from Cajou, he lost his friendship with Cajou.

Meanwhile, the Sioux from across the border are trying to convince the Cree into being allies so together they can fight the Red Coats of Canada. The Sioux promised the Crees to replace the rifles confiscated by the Mounties as they have extra rifles taken from the dead of the 7th US Cavalry which they massacred at the Battle of the Little Bighorn

The Mounties at Fort Saskatchewan were ordered by higher authorities to go to Fort Walsh which is located near the border. During the trip to Fort Walsh, Inspector Benton ordered the sergeant to arrest O'Rourke for refusing to carry out his order. But the sergeant refused to follow his arrest order. This angered Benton who told the men he will have all of them court-martialed when they reach Fort Walsh. When they were nearing Fort Walsh, O'Rourke separated himself from the force to go to the Cree camp to convince the Cree chief not to have an alliance with the Sioux. The Cree chief agrees not to go into an alliance with Sioux on condition they are given rifles to protect themselves from the Sioux since the Sioux told them they will become their enemies if they refuse an alliance.

O'Rourke proceeded to Fort Walsh to inform the superintendent commanding the post of the Cree chief's word of not joining the Sioux in an alliance if their rifles are returned. The superintendent did not agree to the conditions of the Cree chief. Instead he orders the arrest of O'Rourke and his detention. The whole force of Fort Saskatchewan are also held in detention since all of the men of Fort Saskatchewan were arrested and detained when they arrived in Fort Walsh earlier.

The superintendent commanding Fort Walsh received an order from higher authorities to meet and talk to the Sioux to tell them that if they want to live in Canada they must live peacefully. O'Rourke told the superintendent that the Sioux will not talk to him. The superintendent brushes this comment of O'Rourke and orders the post sergeant to prepare the force for a trip to meet the Sioux.

O'Rourke was proven right in his statement that the Sioux will not talk to the Mounties when the Sioux attacked the Mounties who were outnumbered. The situation of the Mounties is critical as they are trapped and surrounded by the Sioux. When the Mounties were feeling desperate because many of their comrades were dead or wounded, O'Rourke and the Cree came charging to the rescue of the trapped Mounties.

== Cast ==
- Alan Ladd as Sub-Inspector Thomas O'Rourke
- Shelley Winters as Grace Markey
- J. Carrol Naish as Batouche
- Hugh O'Brian as US Marshall Carl Smith
- Robert Douglas as Inspector Benton
- George J. Lewis as Lawson
- Richard Long as Patrick J. Scanlon
- Jay Silverheels as Cajou
- Anton Moreno as Chief Dark Cloud
- Frank Chase as Keller
- Lowell Gilmore as Superintendent Banks
- Anthony Caruso as Spotted Eagle
- Henry Wills as Merrill
- Bob Herron as Brill

== Production ==
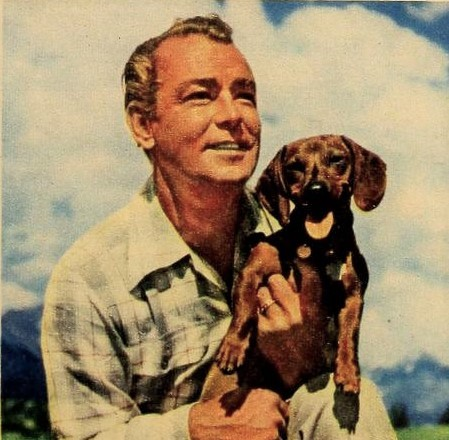
Alan Ladd with his dachshund Red Beret, taken during filming of Saskatchewan, 1953

The film was based on an original story by Gil Doud. Universal announced it in 1952, with Glenn Ford the first star mentioned.

It was Alan Ladd's second starring vehicle for Universal, for whom he had made Desert Legion. The arrangement was made in England, where Ladd was shooting Hell Below Zero. The film was to be shot on location in Canada, enabling Ladd to get a tax exemption from the US government.

"I see absolutely no reason why I should not avail myself of the exemption because it is a law", said Ladd.

Shelley Winters was his co-star in June. She contracted an eye infection when she arrived on location at Lake Louise, but was able to make the film. Filming started August 1953.
