= Tarzan and the Leopard Woman =

1946 film by Kurt Neumann

- Theatrical release poster
- Directed by: Kurt Neumann
- Written by: Carroll Young
- Based on: Characters created by Edgar Rice Burroughs
- Produced by: Sol Lesser
- Starring: Johnny Weissmuller; Brenda Joyce; Johnny Sheffield; Acquanetta
- Cinematography: Karl Struss
- Edited by: Robert O. Crandall
- Music by: Paul Sawtell
- Distributed by: RKO Pictures
- Release date: February 18, 1946 (U.S.)
- Running time: 72 minutes
- Country: United States
- Language: English

Tarzan and the Leopard Woman is a 1946 American action film based on the Tarzan character created by Edgar Rice Burroughs and portrayed by Johnny Weissmuller. Directed by Kurt Neumann, the film sees Tarzan encounter a tribe of leopard-worshippers. It was shot in the Los Angeles County Arboretum and Botanic Garden. Its plot has nothing in common with Burroughs' 1935 novel Tarzan and the Leopard Men.

== Plot ==
Travelers near Zambezi are being killed, apparently by leopards. The commissioner asks Tarzan to look into the matter. Tarzan immediately doubts that leopards are the problem. At the same time, Tarzan, Jane, and Boy take in Kimba, a boy who claims to have become lost in the jungle. Kimba is the brother of Queen Lea, leader of a leopard cult. She has dispatched him to spy on Tarzan. Queen Lea also conspires with Ameer Lazar, a Western-educated doctor who resents the West's domination of the area.

Kimba has a goal of his own: to take the heart of Jane, a deed that would make him a warrior in the eyes of the cult. The Leopard Men wear leopard skins that form a cowl and cape, with iron claws attached to the back of each hand. Queen Lea wears a headband, wrist bands, ankle bands, halter top and miniskirt made of leopard skin. She works her followers into a frenzy in an underground chamber, "These skins are your disguise. These claws are your weapons. Go not as men, but as leopards. Go swiftly, silently."

They attack a caravan bringing four young teachers and bring the maidens back for sacrifice. They also capture Tarzan, Jane, and Boy. Tarzan brings down the roof of the cavern, destroying the cult and rescuing his friends.

The plot is summed up by these lines spoken by Tarzan (about Cheeta): "If an animal can act like a man, why not a man like an animal?"

== Cast ==
- Johnny Weissmuller as Tarzan
- Brenda Joyce as Jane
- Johnny Sheffield as Boy
- Acquanetta as Lea, the High Priestess
- Dennis Hoey as Commissioner
- Tommy Cook as Kimba
- Anthony Caruso as Mongo
- George J. Lewis as Corporal (uncredited)
- Doris Lloyd as Miss Wetherby, School Superintendent (uncredited)
- Ken Terrell as Leopard Man (uncredited)

== Critical reception ==
Writing in DVD Talk, critic Paul Mavis described the film as "[c]ompletely ridiculous fun" and "straight-faced in its overripe campiness," further noting that "[e]ven funnier is harried Tarzan's domestic situation, where Jane, like Blondie to Tarzan's Dagwood, is yapping and complaining about how the tree house is going to 'wrack and ruin' because Tarzan is too lazy to get up off his ass and fix the giant clamshell shower." In critic Jeremy Arnold's review for Turner Classic Movies, he wrote that the film "stands today as a satisfying, action-packed entry in the series," but noted that contemporary reviews in Variety and The New York Times were dismissive of the film's story, production values, directing, and acting.
