= Dick Wesson (actor) =

American actor

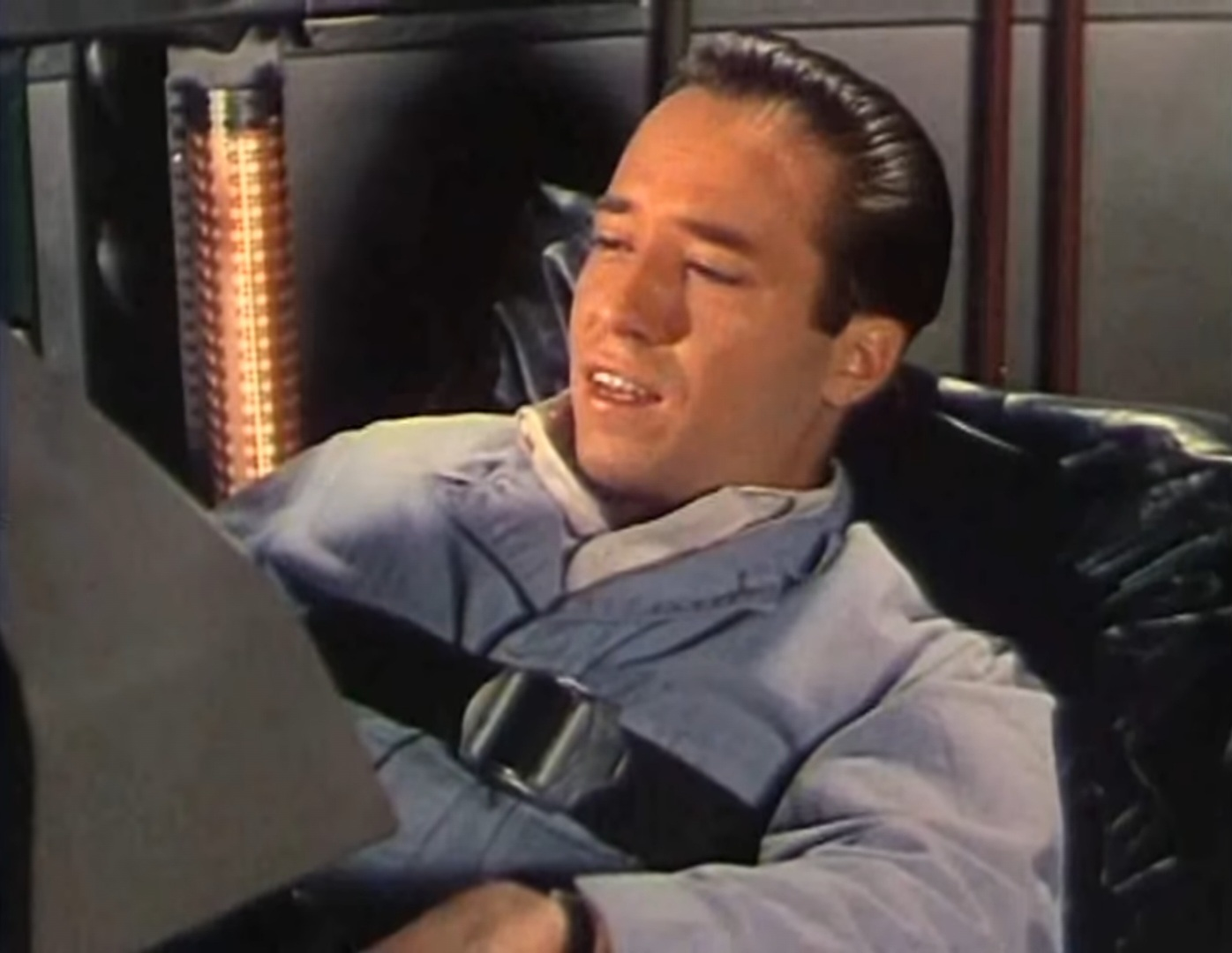
- Trailer for Destination Moon (1950)
- Born: Richard Lewis Wesson; November 19, 1922; Boston, Massachusetts, U.S.
- Died: April 25, 1996 (aged 73); Rancho Mirage, California, U.S.
- Occupations: Actor, comedian
- Years active: 1940–1982

Richard Lewis Wesson (November 19, 1922 – April 25, 1996) was a prolific character actor, comedian, comedy writer, and producer.

== Biography ==
Dick Wesson was born on November 19, 1922, in Boston, Massachusetts. A comedian, impressionist and singer, Wesson appeared with his brother Gene in a comedy act titled "The Wesson Brothers". They had some hit records, such as "Oodles of Boodle" and "All Right Louie, Drop the Gun".

In 1949, Wesson became a television series regular with Jim Backus in Hollywood House. Making his film debut in Destination Moon (1950), Wesson signed a contract with Warner Bros., leaving the studio in 1953. His films there included Breakthrough, Calamity Jane (1953), and The Desert Song. Wesson played comic relief in all his films, frequently as an infantry soldier, as in Force of Arms (1951), and in the Old West with The Man Behind the Gun (1952) and The Charge at Feather River (1953). Wesson's best known role was as female impersonator Francis Fryer in Calamity Jane.

Wesson moved to television, appearing as Jackie Cooper's ex-United States Marine Corps sidekick Rollo, on The People's Choice and as Frank Crenshaw in The Bob Cummings Show. Wesson began writing for The Bob Cummings Show and later The Beverly Hillbillies. He appeared in The Beverly Hillbillies as a taxi driver and as a patient in the season 1 episode "The Clampetts Get Psychoanalyzed". He produced My Sister Eileen and many episodes of Petticoat Junction as well as directed several episodes of each series. He portrayed Jack Reardon on the 1974 CBS situation comedy Paul Sand in Friends and Lovers.

== Death ==
Wesson later died of an aneurysm on April 25, 1996, in Rancho Mirage, California.

== Filmography ==
Film
Year	Title	Role	Notes
1950	Destination Moon	Joe Sweeney	
1950	Breakthrough	Pvt. Sammy Hansen	
1951	Inside the Walls of Folsom Prison	Tinker	
1951	Force of Arms	Kleiner	
1951	Jim Thorpe – All-American	Ed Guyac	
1951	Sunny Side of the Street	Dave Gibson	
1951	Starlift	Sgt. Mike Nolan	
1952	About Face	Dave Crouse	
1953	The Man Behind the Gun	Sgt. 'Monk' Walker	
1953	The Desert Song	Benjamin 'Benjy' Kidd	
1953	The Charge at Feather River	Pvt. Cullen	
1953	Calamity Jane	Francis Fryer	
1955	Paris Follies of 1956	Chuck Russell	
1961	The Errand Boy	The A.D.	
1977	Rollercoaster	Tourist Father	
