= Island of Lost Women =

1959 film by Frank Tuttle

- Theatrical release poster
- Directed by: Frank Tuttle
- Written by: Ray Buffum; Prescott Chaplin (story)
- Produced by: George C. Bertholon; Albert J. Cohen; Alan Ladd
- Starring: Jeff Richards; Venetia Stevenson; John Smith; Alan Napier; Diane Jergens; June Blair
- Cinematography: John F. Seitz
- Edited by: Roland Gross
- Music by: Raoul Kraushaar; Dave Kahn
- Production company: Jaguar Productions
- Distributed by: Warner Bros. Pictures
- Release date: May 1959
- Running time: 71 minutes
- Country: United States
- Language: English

Island of Lost Women is a 1959 American independently made black-and-white castaways melodrama film, produced by George C. Bertholon, Albert J. Cohen, and Alan Ladd, that was directed by Frank Tuttle and released by Warner Bros. Pictures. The film stars Jeff Richards, Venetia Stevenson, John Smith, Alan Napier, Diane Jergens, and June Blair. The film's storyline borrows details from Shakespeare's The Tempest and more contemporaneously the 1956 science fiction film Forbidden Planet.

== Plot ==
Mark Bradley is a radio commentator whose pilot, Joe Walker, is flying him across the South Pacific to a conference in Australia.

Engine trouble develops, and Walker must make a forced landing on the beach of a small, uncharted island inhabited by Dr. Paul Lujan and his three naive daughters, who have never known any man except their father.

Lujan, unfriendly to the point of hostility, orders the intruders to leave his island, but one of their aircraft's two engines is too badly damaged for them to be able to comply without first making repairs. He grants them a couple days in order to do so. In the meantime he grudgingly introduces Bradley and Walker to his trio of young, beautiful daughters, Venus, Urana, and Mercuria. The two men soon learn that Dr. Lujan was an atomic scientist who fled the civilized world with his family because he fears the havoc being caused by the discovery of nuclear energy.

To the doctor's disapproval, his two older daughters easily fall in love with the two attractive strangers and try to help them, while the third, 16 and jealous of her sisters, tries to foil their plans. This forces them to make a choice between staying on the island with their father or returning with the two men to a civilization they have only experienced via short wave radio broadcasts. When Bradley mentions that he plans on doing a radio broadcast about Lujan and his island location after he returns to civilization, the doctor begins to scheme a way to keep the men and his daughters on the island.

== Cast ==
- Jeff Richards as Mark Bradley
- Venetia Stevenson as Venus
- John Smith as Joe Walker
- Diane Jergens as Urana
- June Blair as Mercuria
- Alan Napier as Dr. Paul Lujan
- Gavin Muir as Dr. McBain
- George Brand as M. Hugh Garland
- Tom Riley as Co-Pilot (uncredited)
- Bob Stratton as Pilot (uncredited)
- Stan Sweet as 2nd Pilot (uncredited)
- Vern Taylor as Co-Pilot (uncredited)

== Production ==
The film was based on an original story by Prescott Chaplin. Film rights were bought by Jaguar Productions, Alan Ladd's production company, which had a film development deal with Warner Bros. Ray Buffum was hired to write the script. Frank Tuttle, who just made Hell on Frisco Bay for Jaguar, was assigned to direct. Jeff Richards was given the lead role and was signed by Jaguar to a five-year contract for two films a year. Warner Bros contract star Venetia Stevenson was cast opposite him. June Blair was borrowed from 20th Century Fox.
