= The Big Land =

1957 film by Gordon Douglas

- Theatrical release poster
- Directed by: Gordon Douglas
- Screenplay by: David Dortort; Martin Rackin
- Story by: David Dortort
- Based on: Buffalo Grass; 1956 novel by Frank Gruber
- Produced by: George C. Bertholon
- Starring: Alan Ladd; Virginia Mayo; Edmond O'Brien
- Cinematography: John F. Seitz
- Edited by: Thomas Reilly
- Music by: David Buttolph
- Production company: Jaguar Productions
- Distributed by: Warner Bros. Pictures
- Release dates: February 23, 1957 (Los Angeles); March 1, 1957 (New York City)
- Running time: 92 minutes
- Country: United States
- Language: English

The Big Land is a 1957 American Western film in Warnercolor directed by Gordon Douglas and starring Alan Ladd, Virginia Mayo and Edmond O'Brien.

== Plot ==
Back home in Texas following the Civil War, former Confederate officer Chad Morgan (Alan Ladd) leads a cattle drive to Missouri, assuring fellow ranchers that their stock will bring $20 a head at auction. Instead, ruthless cattle baron Brog (Anthony Caruso) has scared off all competition and offers a dollar and a half a head for the half-starved Longhorns, who had little good grazing along the trail. Chad had enough of violence during the war, and chooses not to confront Brog, a skilled gunfighter, who wounds one of Chad's companions.

Blamed for what happened, Morgan chooses not to return to Texas. He spends a night in a livery stable and meets town drunk Joe Jagger (Edmond O'Brien), who is nearly lynched for trying to steal whiskey. Chad helps keep Joe sober after they leave town. On their journey, Chad finds out the rail line has been extended well into Kansas, much closer to Texas, and there is good grass land there to fatten the cattle up after the long trek, making them more valuable. He also learns Joe is a talented architect, who has worked on important projects, but never finished any of them, because of his drinking.

They meet farmers who are growing a lot of wheat and have nowhere to sell it. Chad has an idea...between cattle from Texas and wheat from Kansas, the railroad might be persuaded to build a spur line. So Chad and Joe ride to Kansas City to meet Tom Draper (Don Castle), a railroad man. He is engaged to Joe's sister, Helen (Virginia Mayo), a singer in the saloon. Tom likes the idea of a railroad spur to aid the farmers and cattlemen...separately, neither would be enough to make it worthwhile.

Helen is pleased at the change in her brother and thanks Chad, which brings out some jealousy in her fiancé. Brog and his sidekick disrupt the town's construction attempts while Chad is off getting his fellow cattlemen to drive their steers to Kansas. Brog, wanting to monopolize the new market, murders one of the cattle buyers to scare the others off, so he can still bid low. At first, Joe backs down from Brog and is handed a bottle of whiskey. While in his office, he pours a shot and smashes it on the floor. When he does confront Brog and his sidekick, Brog gets him to draw his gun and murders him.

Blaming Chad for not being there, Helen turns on him upon his return. Brog stampedes cattle through the town to try and destroy Chad and Joe's rebellion against his monopoly. Chad meets Brog and his man in the saloon. In spite of the 2-to-1 odds, Chad prevails in the gunfight. Helen runs to and embraces him. Tom realizes he has lost her for good. Sven gave him some good advice on handling his loss. The vision he, Chad, and Joe had together has come to fruition.

== Cast ==
- Alan Ladd as Chad Morgan
- Virginia Mayo as Helen Jagger
- Edmond O'Brien as Joe Jagger
- Anthony Caruso as Brog
- Julie Bishop as Kate Johnson
- John Qualen as Sven Johnson
- Don Castle as Tom Draper
- David Ladd as David Johnson
- Jack Wrather Jr. as Olaf Johnson
- George J. Lewis as Dawson

== Production ==
The film was based on the novel Buffalo Grass, which was published in 1955. Alan Ladd's Jaguar Productions bought film rights prior to publication for a reported $100,000. The movie was meant to be the first in a revised four-year production deal between Jaguar Productions and Warner Bros. Pictures. Frank Gruber himself was hired to write the script and Eleanor Parker and Robert Ryan were discussed as possible co-stars to Ladd. Eventually, Edmond O'Brien – who had just made A Cry in the Night for Jaguar – and Virginia Mayo – who was under contract to Warner Bros and who had acted opposite Ladd before – were cast.

The movie was shot near Sonora, California, a location not far from Yosemite National Park over four weeks in June 1956. The unit then moved to the Warner Bros backlot. Four different sets for the township were created – to show the town being built, after it had been burnt, to film the burning sequence, and to show the town being completed.

== Reception ==
The Los Angeles Times said the film "is about as plodding as a western can get and still be called one."

Before the film was made, a possible follow-up The Dry Lands was mentioned in the press.

== See also ==
- List of American films of 1957
