= Rico Alaniz =

Mexican-American actor (1919–2015)

Americo "Rico" Alaniz
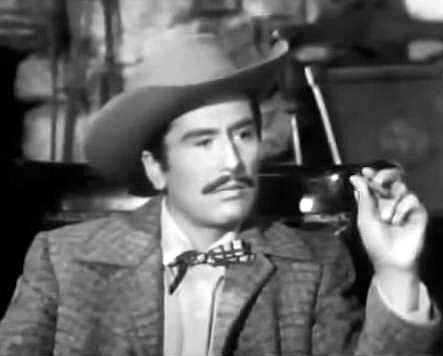
- Alaniz in The Adventures of Kit Carson (1951)
- Born: October 25, 1919; Juárez, Mexico
- Died: March 9, 2015 (aged 95); Los Angeles, California, U.S.
- Occupation: Actor
- Years active: 1950–1992

Americo Zorilla "Rico" Alaniz (October 25, 1919 – March 9, 2015) was a Mexican-American actor.

== Early years ==
Alaniz was born in Juárez, Mexico, and began riding when he was a child.

== Selected filmography ==
- The Capture (1950) - Policeman (uncredited)
- A Lady Without Passport (1950) - Young Cuban Man (uncredited)
- Mister 880 (1950) - Carlos - Spanish Interpreter (uncredited)
- Smuggler's Island (1951) - Young Portuguese (uncredited)
- Hollywood Story (1951) - Spanish Actor (uncredited)
- Golden Girl (1951) - Bandit (uncredited)
- The Fighter (1952) - Carlos
- Viva Zapata! (1952) - Guard (uncredited)
- Macao (1952) - Bus Driver (uncredited)
- California Conquest (1952) - Pedro
- Tropic Zone (1953) - Capt. Basilio (uncredited)
- Jeopardy (1953) - Officer at 1st Roadblock (uncredited)
- Column South (1953) - Trooper Chavez
- The Desert Song (1953) - Legionnaire (uncredited)
- Wings of the Hawk (1953) - Capt. Gomez
- Conquest of Cochise (1953) - Felipe
- Appointment in Honduras (1953) - Bermudez
- Jubilee Trail (1954) - Spaniard (uncredited)
- Phantom of the Rue Morgue (1954) - Gendarme (uncredited)
- Siege at Red River (1954) - Chief Yellow Hawk
- Drum Beat (1954) - Medicine Man (uncredited)
- Green Fire (1954) - Antonio
- The Last Command (1955) - Tomas (uncredited)
- Santiago (1956) - Dominguez (uncredited)
- Back from Eternity (1956) - Latin Official (uncredited)
- The Cruel Tower (1956) - Frenchy (uncredited)
- The Women of Pitcairn Island (1956) - The Spanisher
- Stagecoach to Fury (1956) - Miguel Torres
- Toughest Gun in Tombstone (1958) - Fernandez (uncredited)
- War of the Colossal Beast (1958) - Sgt. Luis Murillo
- Hong Kong Confidential (1958) - Fernando
- Wolf Larsen (1958) - Louis
- Sea Hunt (1960, Season 3, Episode 13) - Carlos Prado
- The Magnificent Seven (1960) - Sotero
- Summer and Smoke (1961) - Knife Thrower (uncredited)
- Gunsmoke (1963 episode "Extradition Part 1 & 2" - El Piñon
- The Virginian (1963 episode "The Mountain of the Sun" - Bandido Leader
- Hotel (1967) - Chairman (uncredited)
- Final Analysis (1992) - Old Spanish Man (final film role)

The Life And Legend Of Wyatt Earp tv series - Mr. Cousin - 19 episodes
