= Lone Texan =

1959 film by Paul Landres

- Theatrical release poster
- Directed by: Paul Landres
- Screenplay by: James Landis; Jack W. Thomas
- Produced by: Jack Leewood
- Starring: Willard Parker; Grant Williams; Audrey Dalton; Douglas Kennedy; June Blair; Dabbs Greer
- Cinematography: Walter Strenge
- Edited by: Robert Fritch
- Music by: Paul Dunlap
- Production company: Regal Films Inc
- Distributed by: 20th Century Fox
- Release date: March 1, 1959
- Running time: 71 minutes
- Country: United States
- Language: English

Lone Texan is a 1959 American Western film directed by Paul Landres and written by James Landis and Jack W. Thomas. The film stars Willard Parker, Grant Williams, Audrey Dalton, Douglas Kennedy, June Blair and Dabbs Greer. The film was released on March 1, 1959, by 20th Century Fox.

== Cast ==
- Willard Parker as Clint Banister
- Grant Williams as Greg Banister
- Audrey Dalton as Susan Harvey
- Douglas Kennedy as Maj. Phillip Harvey
- June Blair as Florrie Stuart
- Dabbs Greer as Doc Jansen
- Barbara Heller as Amy Todd
- Rayford Barnes as Finch
- Tyler McVey as Henry Biggs
- Lee Farr as Riff
- Jimmy Murphy as Rio (as Jim Murphy)
- Richard Monahan as Jesse (as Dick Monaghan)
- Robert Dix as Carpetbagger
- Gregg Barton as Ben Hollis
- I. Stanford Jolley as Trader
- Sid Melton as Gus Pringle
- Shirley Haven as Nancy (as Shirle Haven)
