= A Piece of the Action (Star Trek: The Original Series) =

- Star Trek: The Original Series episode
- Episode no.: Season 2 Episode 17
- Directed by: James Komack
- Story by: David P. Harmon
- Teleplay by: David P. Harmon; Gene L. Coon
- Cinematography by: Jerry Finnerman
- Production code: 049
- Original air date: January 12, 1968

Guest appearances
- Anthony Caruso – Bela Oxmyx; Vic Tayback – Jojo Krako; Lee Delano – Kalo; John Harmon – Tepo; Sheldon Collins – Tough Kid; Dyanne Thorne – First Girl; Sharyn Hillyer – Second Girl; Buddy Garion – Hood; Steven Marlo – Zabo

Episode chronology
| ← Previous "The Gamesters of Triskelion" | Next → "The Immunity Syndrome" |
- Star Trek: The Original Series season 2

"A Piece of the Action" is the seventeenth episode of the second season of the American science fiction television series Star Trek. Written by David P. Harmon and Gene L. Coon, and directed by James Komack, it was first broadcast on January 12, 1968.

The Enterprise visits a planet with an Earth-like 1920s gangster culture, with Runyonesque dialog and costumes.

This was the last Star Trek script credited to Gene L. Coon. Its repeat on August 30, 1968, was the last episode to air in the 8:30 pm time slot on Friday nights on NBC.

== Plot ==
The Federation starship USS Enterprise has been ordered to Sigma Iotia II, where the exploratory vessel Horizon was reported missing 100 years earlier. The ship receives a message from Bela Oxmyx (the surname is also shown as Okmyx, in the episode), a native Iotian who promises information about the Horizon and invites the crew down to the planet. First Officer Spock notes that their interference in the planet's development could violate the Prime Directive, but Captain Kirk points out that the Horizon's arrival a century ago would have already contaminated the culture. Kirk, Spock, and Chief Medical Officer Dr. McCoy transport to the planet.

They find themselves in a city fashioned after an American city of the 1920s, and some of the residents appear to be gangsters carrying Tommy guns. Oxmyx's men escort the landing party to his offices; en route, they observe a drive-by shooting that kills one of their escorts, but the other continues on as if nothing had happened. They arrive at Oxmyx's office, where Oxmyx orders his men to make a retaliatory attack against a rival gang led by Jojo Krako. Spock discovers an Earth book, Chicago Mobs of the Twenties, published in 1992, and he determines it was left by the crew of the Horizon. The Iotians have modelled their entire society on "The Book", which they regard with near-religious reverence. Oxmyx demands the Enterprise crew supply his gang with "heaters" (phasers, which was also American crime underworld slang for handguns), and when Kirk refuses, threatens to kill them. The landing party is held while Oxmyx uses a communicator to repeat the demand to Chief Engineer Scott.

Kirk distracts the Iotian guards by belittling their poker game and teaching them the fictitious game of "Fizzbin", allowing Spock and McCoy, plus Kirk, to overpower the men. Kirk orders McCoy and Spock to flee to a radio station to contact the Enterprise then transport back to the ship, while Kirk attempts to fix the violent situation on the planet resulting from the Federation’s previous visit. But Krako's men immediately capture Kirk.

Krako demands phasers of Kirk as well, offering to cut him in for a third of "the action" in exchange. Kirk offers a peaceful solution, but Krako refuses and confines him, threatening to kill him by slow torture if he doesn't cooperate. Oxmyx contacts the ship, informs them of Kirk's capture, and offers to help rescue Kirk if they will help him. Spock and McCoy return to the planet but are quickly captured by Oxmyx. However, Kirk has managed to engineer his own escape, and arrives in Oxmyx's office in time to rescue Spock and McCoy.

The three set a plan in motion. Taking suits and hats from Oxmyx's men, Kirk and Spock gain entry to Krako's headquarters with the help of a tough, streetwise Iotian boy who wants “a piece of the action”. Quickly subduing Krako's men, Kirk informs Krako that the Federation is taking over the entire planet, but if Krako helps maintain order and becomes a cooperative partner to the Federation, it will give him a "piece of the action". Krako agrees, but for safekeeping, Kirk transports him to the Enterprise. Kirk then makes the same offer to Oxmyx, which he quickly accepts.

As the Enterprise’s officers prepare to hold a meeting on the planet with all of the Iotian mob bosses, Krako's men attack Oxmyx's headquarters. However, the Enterprise uses the ship's phasers to stun the men as they approach. Both Oxmyx and Krako realize that they are at Kirk's mercy, and agree to work for the Federation. Kirk installs Oxmyx as the top boss and Krako as his lieutenant. Kirk states that a Federation ship will come by once a year for their 40% cut of the planet's "action".

Kirk, Spock, and McCoy transport back to the Enterprise where Kirk proposes that the Federation's "cut" be used in a planetary fund to guide the Iotians into becoming a more ethical society. McCoy reveals that he accidentally left his communicator on the planet. Kirk and Spock note that the Iotians will analyze the technology. Kirk amusedly quips that the Iotians might one day be in a technological position to demand "a piece of our action!"

== Reception ==
- A 1995 newspaper fan vote for worst episode of the series nominated this episode and "The Children Shall Lead".
- In 2009, Zack Handlen of The A.V. Club gave the episode a "B+" rating, noting that it was a "very silly hour of Trek, and it's a wonderfully entertaining one".
- In 2013, Wired magazine ranked this episode one of the top ten episodes of the original television series.
- In 2015, Polygon ranked "A Piece of the Action" as one of the three best Spock-centric episodes of Star Trek. They praised actor Leonard Nimoy for his portrayal of Spock with "dry, calculated wit."
- In 2016, The Hollywood Reporter rated "A Piece of the Action" the 12th best television episode of all Star Trek franchise television shows prior to Star Trek: Discovery, including live-action and animated series but not counting the movies.
- In 2018, Collider ranked this episode the 18th best original series episode.
- A 2018 Star Trek binge-watching guide by Den of Geek recommended this episode as one of the best of the original series.
- In 2019, the episode was noted as the 8th funniest episode of the Star Trek franchise, by CBR.
- In 2020, Deadline Hollywood and IndieWire cited "A Piece of the Action" as the episode that influenced Quentin Tarantino's pitch for an unproduced Star Trek film developed as a potential Star Trek reboot that would serve as a film prequel to Star Trek: The Original Series.
- In 2021, Den of Geek ranked this the fifth best episode of the original series, noting how it demonstrated the range of genres Star Trek can enter, as well as praising its comedic elements.

== See also ==
- Organized crime in 1920s Chicago, the Chicago Outfit, and North Side Gang
