= Guns of the Timberland =

1960 film by Robert D. Webb

- Theatrical release poster
- Directed by: Robert D. Webb
- Written by: Joseph Petracca; Aaron Spelling
- Based on: Guns of the Timberlands; 1955 novel by Louis L'Amour
- Produced by: Aaron Spelling; Alan Ladd
- Starring: Alan Ladd; Jeanne Crain; Gilbert Roland; Frankie Avalon
- Cinematography: John F. Seitz
- Edited by: Tom McAdoo
- Music by: David Buttolph
- Production company: Jaguar Productions
- Distributed by: Warner Bros. Pictures
- Release date: February 1, 1960
- Running time: 91 minutes
- Country: United States
- Language: English

Guns of the Timberland is a 1960 American Technicolor lumberjack Western film directed by Robert D. Webb and starring Alan Ladd, Jeanne Crain, Gilbert Roland and Frankie Avalon. It is based on the 1955 book Guns of the Timberlands by Louis L'Amour.

== Plot ==
Logger Jim Hadley and his lumberjack crew are looking for new forest to cut. They locate a prime prospect outside the town of Deep Wells. The town's residents, led by Laura Riley, are opposed to the felling of the trees, believing that losing them would cause mudslides during the heavy rains.

== Cast ==
- Alan Ladd as Jim Hadley
- Jeanne Crain as Laura Riley
- Gilbert Roland as Monty Welker
- Frankie Avalon as Bert Harvey
- Lyle Bettger as Clay Bell
- Noah Beery Jr. as Blackie (as Noah Beery)
- Verna Felton as Aunt Sarah
- Alana Ladd as Jane Peterson
- Regis Toomey as Sheriff Taylor
- Johnny Seven as Vince
- George Selk as Amos Stearns
- Paul E. Burns as Bill Burroughs
- Henry Kulky as Logger

== Production ==
=== Development ===
Louis L'Amour's novel Guns of the Timberlands was published in 1955 and sold more than one million copies. Alan Ladd's film production company Jaguar optioned the novel that same year. The working title for the film was "Shasta."

In 1957, it was announced the film would be produced from a script by David Victor and Herbert Little, with Albert J. Cohen as producer. Ladd had worked with Aaron Spelling on two TV pilots, and Spelling's work so impressed Ladd that he made Spelling a producer on the picture. Robert Webb was signed to direct.

Ladd offered a lead role to Van Heflin, hoping to reunite with his costar from Shane. He also wanted to cast Raymond Burr. Jeanne Crain and Gilbert Roland were signed to support Ladd, along with the Ladds' daughter Alana.

Frankie Avalon, following his recent hit single Venus, signed to make his dramatic debut in the film. Avalon later said, "I'm sure the reason why Warner Bros. said, 'Let's get this kid' is that he has lots of fans out there and he's getting 12,000 to 15,000 fans letters a week. 'Let's put him in a picture with a guy like Alan Ladd'."

=== Shooting ===
Filming started in April 1959 on location in and around Blairsden, California, Graeagle, California and other locations throughout Plumas County. The scenes involving the steam engine and railroad cars were shot on the Western Pacific Railroad right-of-way between Portola, California and Blairsden, California. In the opening scene, the "tall bridge" that the steam engine crosses is the Clio Trestle.

Filming finished in June 1959.

=== Music ===
In the film, Avalon sings two songs, "The Faithful Kind" and "Gee Whiz Whillikins Golly Gee." Both were released as a 45-rpm single in 1960.

== Reception ==
According to Filmink Guns of the Timberland "is not much of a movie – Ladd's alcoholism caused his appearance to deteriorate markedly by now, the story is a little weak, and Frankie Avalon doesn't really suit Western garb with that distinctive haircut."
