= June Blair =

American model and actress (1932–2022)

- Blair in 1960

Playboy centerfold appearance
- January 1957
- Preceded by: Lisa Winters
- Succeeded by: Sally Todd

Personal details
- Born: October 20, 1932 San Francisco, California, U.S.
- Died: December 4, 2022 (aged 90) Sherman Oaks, California, U.S.
- Height: 5 ft 5 in (1.65 m)

Margaret June Blair (October 20, 1932 – December 4, 2022) was an American model and actress. She was best known for being Playboy magazine's Playmate of the Month for its January 1957 issue and for being part of the TV series The Adventures of Ozzie and Harriet as the wife of her real-life husband David Nelson.

== Acting career ==
Blair made her first television appearance in 1954. Through the rest of the decade, she took supporting roles in feature films and guest-starred in series television, including two episodes, "Performance Under Fire" and "The Dead Ringer" of the 1960–61 syndicated western series Two Faces West.

== Personal life and death ==
Blair was engaged to the singer Nino Tempo in 1957. The next year she broke off her engagement with Tempo and started dating Lindsay Crosby. On May 21, 1961, Blair married David Nelson and joined the cast of The Adventures of Ozzie and Harriet. Ricky Nelson was the best man. She had two sons with David, born 1962 and 1966; they divorced in 1975. David Nelson died on January 11, 2011.

Blair died in Sherman Oaks, California, on December 4, 2022, at the age of 90.

== Filmography ==
- Our Miss Brooks (1956) (uncredited) .... Miss Lonelyhearts
- Conflict - "The Money" (1957) .... Blonde
- This Could Be the Night (1957) (uncredited) .... Chorus Girl
- Man of a Thousand Faces (1957) (uncredited) .... Chorine
- Bachelor Father - "Bentley Versus the Girl Scouts" (1957)
- Hell Bound (1957) .... Paula
- The Fiend Who Walked the West (1958)
- Lone Texan (1959) .... Florrie Stuart
- Island of Lost Women (1959) .... Mercuria
- Warlock (1959) (uncredited) .... Dance hall girl
- The Rabbit Trap (1959) .... Judy Colt
- The Best of Everything (1959) .... Brenda
- Bat Masterson
  - "Dead Men Don't Pay Debts" (1959)
  - "Death by Decree" (1960) .... Constance Whitney
- Hawaiian Eye - "Three Tickets to Lani" (1959) .... Anita Callahan
- Lock-Up
  - "Music to Murder By" (1959)
  - "Court Martial" (1961)
- The Texan - "Town Divided" (1960) .... Ellen Warren
- Tombstone Territory (1960) "Revenge" ..... Lady Bell
- Sea Hunt
  - "Water Nymphs" (Season 3, Episode 2 1960)
  - "Cross Current" (1960)
- M Squad - "The Bad Apple" (1960) .... Patty Conway
- The Chevy Mystery Show - "The Inspector Vanishes" (1960) .... Colette Dufour
- A Fever in the Blood (1961) .... Paula Thornwall
- The Aquanauts - "The Defective Tank Adventure" (1961) .... June Noreen
- The Adventures of Ozzie & Harriet (1961–1966) .... June

== See also ==
- List of people in Playboy 1953–1959

June Blair	Sally Todd	Saundra Edwards	Gloria Windsor	Dawn Richard	Carrie Radison
Jean Jani	Dolores Donlon	Jacquelyn Prescott	Colleen Farrington	Marlene Callahan	Linda Vargas
