= The Man Behind the Gun =

1953 film by Felix E. Feist

- Directed by: Felix Feist
- Screenplay by: John Twist
- Story by: Robert Buckner
- Produced by: Robert Sisk
- Starring: Randolph Scott; Patrice Wymore; Dick Wesson
- Cinematography: Bert Glennon
- Edited by: Owen Marks
- Music by: David Buttolph
- Color process: Technicolor
- Production company: Warner Bros. Pictures
- Distributed by: Warner Bros. Pictures
- Release date: January 31, 1953
- Running time: 82 minutes
- Country: United States
- Language: English
- Box office: $2 million (US)

The Man Behind the Gun is a 1953 American Western film about the establishment of the city of Los Angeles. It was directed by Felix Feist and stars Randolph Scott.

== Plot ==
Working as an undercover agent, Ransome Callicut travels west by stagecoach. Notorious bandit Vic Sutro tries to rob it, but Callicut captures him and turns over Sutro to an Army captain, Roy Giles, upon arrival in California.

School teacher Lora Roberts, another passenger, has made the trip to marry Giles, but she becomes ensnared in Senator Mark Sheldon's nefarious schemes and also discovers Giles has been seeing Chona Degnon, a singer.

The heart of the criminal operation is at the enormous nightclub/gambling house run by Buckley, where Chona is the headline entertainment. Attempting to win a rigged weight-lifting contest, Bryce's crony Olaf Swenson falls through the floor into the basement, where a large amount of illegal guns and gunpowder kegs are discovered.

The criminals are ostensibly attempting to make Southern California a slave state area. But this is only a blind for the true goal of cornering water rights and undiscovered oil land.

Sheldon murders a rival senator, Creegan, and fakes his own death. He kidnaps Lora as well. After she realizes that Callicut is actually a government agent, Lora persuades Chona that she can have Giles for herself if only she'll come to her aid. Sheldon also kills Chona before she can betray him, but he is brought to justice by Callicut, who is kissed by a grateful Lora.

== Cast ==
- Randolph Scott as Maj. Ransome Callicut aka Rick Bryce
- Patrice Wymore as Lora Roberts
- Dick Wesson as "Monk" Walker
- Philip Carey as Capt. Roy Giles
- Lina Romay as Chona Degnon
- Roy Roberts as Sen. Mark Sheldon
- Morris Ankrum as Bram Creegan
- Katharine Warren as Phoebe Sheldon
- Alan Hale Jr. as Olaf Swenson
- Douglas Fowley as Buckley
- Tony Caruso as Vic Sutro
- Clancy Cooper as Kansas Collins
- Robert Cabal as Joaquin Murietta
