= The Helen Morgan Story =

1957 film by Michael Curtiz

- Theatrical release poster
- Directed by: Michael Curtiz
- Written by: Nelson Gidding; Stephen Longstreet; Dean Riesner; Oscar Saul
- Produced by: Martin Rackin
- Starring: Ann Blyth; Paul Newman; Richard Carlson
- Cinematography: Ted D. McCord
- Edited by: Frank Bracht
- Music by: Ray Heindorf
- Distributed by: Warner Bros. Pictures
- Release date: 5 October 1957
- Running time: 118 minutes
- Country: United States
- Language: English

The Helen Morgan Story, released in the UK as Both Ends of the Candle, is a 1957 American biographical film directed by Michael Curtiz starring Ann Blyth and Paul Newman.

The screenplay by Oscar Saul, Dean Riesner, Stephen Longstreet, and Nelson Gidding is based on the life and career of torch singer/actress Helen Morgan, with fictional touches liberally added for dramatic purposes. This turned out to be Blyth's final film role.

Another version of Morgan's life story, Helen Morgan, was produced as a live television drama on Playhouse 90, with Polly Bergen as Morgan. Despite requests to delay the television version, it aired five months before the release of the film.

== Plot ==
Helen Morgan begins her career as a Chicago carnival dancer. She catches the eye of fast-talking, double-dealing Larry Maddux, whose promotion catapults her to fame as a Broadway performer in Show Boat and a headliner in her own nightclub.

Helen is involved in two romantic relationships – with Maddux, and with wealthy attorney Russell Wade – each of which cause her great anguish. When she realizes the caddish Maddux has been merely using her to support the upscale lifestyle he has come to enjoy, she turns to alcohol. Wade, who is genuinely in love with Helen, is nonetheless married and a divorce is impossible; this helps drive her further into the bottle.

She loses the bulk of her money to the Bureau of Internal Revenue and the Wall Street crash of 1929, hits rock bottom and, finally is hospitalized in the alcoholic ward of Bellevue.

Maddux has a redemptive change of heart and arranges a gala dinner, hosted by Walter Winchell and Florenz Ziegfeld, in Helen's honor. The film's ending suggests this was her first step on the road to recovery, success, and happiness; this, however, was not the case for the real Helen Morgan.

== Cast ==
- Ann Blyth as Helen Morgan
- Paul Newman as Larry Maddux
- Richard Carlson as Russell Wade
- Gene Evans as Whitey Krause
- Alan King as Benny Weaver
- Cara Williams as Dolly Evans
- Walter Woolf King as Florenz Ziegfeld
- Virginia Vincent as Sue
- Juanita Moore as Lucey – Backstage Maid
- Iris Adrian as Louise Jensen (uncredited)

== Production ==
In 1950, Boxoffice announced Warner Bros. Pictures was planning to release a musical biography with Doris Day as Helen Morgan. This is one of the few studio projects Day refused to make, citing she did not want to portray the sordid aspects of Morgan's life, which were in direct contrast to Day's wholesome screen image. There was also considerable speculation and negotiation over the prospect that the film would be made with Judy Garland, following her Oscar-nominated performance in A Star is Born.

== Soundtrack ==
Although Ann Blyth was known to be a talented singer, her voice was dubbed by Gogi Grant. A soundtrack album is available on compact disc.

- Why Was I Born?
- I Can't Give You Anything But Love
- Medley: If You Were the Only Girl in the World / Avalon / Do Do Do / Breezin' Along with the Breeze
- Love Nest
- Medley: Someone to Watch Over Me / The One I Love Belongs to Somebody Else
- Body and Soul
- April in Paris
- Speak of Me of Love
- More Than You Know
- On the Sunny Side of the Street
- The Man I Love
- Medley: Just a Memory / Deep Night
- Don't Ever Leave Me
- Medley: I've Got a Crush on You / I'll Get By
- Something to Remember You By
- My Melancholy Baby
- Bill
- Can't Help Lovin' Dat Man

== Critical reception ==
In his review in The New York Times, A. H. Weiler called the film "as uplifting as soap opera" and added, "The indestructible tunes and the producers' fairly honest approach to the sleaziness of the speakeasy era should generate genuine nostalgia, but Miss Morgan's career, on film, appears to be uninspired, familiar fare...It's all about as heart-warming as an electric pad. Ann Blyth...desperately attempts to capture the essentially moving qualities of the performer...[she] is fragile, sweet and timorous in the role, but she cannot manage to project the idea that she is swaying audiences either by singing or emotional force."

Variety called it "little more than a tuneful soap opera" and added, "The story line sometimes strains credulity and the dialogue situations occasionally give the production a cornball flavor...Director Michael Curtiz has done a good job with the material at hand, injecting a pacing and bits of business that help maintain interest, and the production gets added benefit from a series of hit tunes of the era...Blyth turns in a sympathetic but not always convincing performance. Newman is very good as the rackets guy, giving the part authority and credibility."

TV Guide wrote "Helen Morgan was the greatest torch singer, a petite brunette who sat atop pianos plaintively warbling sad songs about the men who mistreated her. More a profile of those songs than a detailed exposition of her life, this film offers only a slice of a fabulous and unforgettable career...most of the wobbly plot is fictional, which is unfortunate since Morgan's true story was much more spectacular and, had it been followed, would have provided a finer film."

== See also ==
- List of American films of 1957
