= Santiago (1956 film) =

1956 film by Gordon Douglas

- Directed by: Gordon Douglas
- Written by: Martin Rackin; John Twist
- Based on: Santiago by Martin Rackin
- Produced by: Alan Ladd; Martin Rackin
- Starring: Alan Ladd; Rossana Podestà; Lloyd Nolan
- Cinematography: John F. Seitz
- Edited by: Owen Marks
- Music by: David Buttolph
- Production company: Warner Bros. Pictures
- Distributed by: Warner Bros. Pictures
- Release date: July 13, 1956
- Running time: 93 minutes
- Country: United States
- Language: English
- Box office: $2 million (US)

Santiago, is a 1956 American Warnercolor adventure film directed by Gordon Douglas and starring Alan Ladd, Rossana Podestà and Lloyd Nolan. It is set in 1898 Cuba against the background of the Cuban War of Independence. Martin Rackin wrote the screenplay, based on his unpublished novel, as well as producing the film. Ladd also co-produced the film that was made and distributed by Warner Bros. Pictures.

== Plot ==
A hardened gun runner attempts to take a shipment to Cuba to assist with the rebellion against Spain.

== Cast ==
- Alan Ladd as Caleb "Cash" Adams
- Rossana Podestà as Doña Isabella
- Lloyd Nolan as Clay Pike
- Chill Wills as Captain "Sidewheel" Jones
- Paul Fix as Trasker
- L. Q. Jones as "Digger"
- Frank De Kova as Jingo
- George J. Lewis as Pablo
- Royal Dano as "Lobo"
- Don Blackman as Sam
- Francisco Ruiz as Juanito
- Clegg Hoyt as "Dutch"
- Nesdon Booth as Burns
- Baynes Barron as Wyatt
- Edward Colmans as Lorenzo
- Rico Alaniz as Dominguez
- Alma Beltran as Cuban Woman
- Natalie Masters as Governess

== Production ==
The project was first announced in July 1955 and was originally known as The Greater Courage. It was based on an unpublished novel by Martin Rackin, who also acted as producer. Although Ladd had his own production company, Jaguar Productions, who released movies through Warner Bros. Pictures, he made this movie for Warners solely as actor.

"The principal difficulty, whether you take a salary from a studio or are in business for yourself, is finding the right story", said Ladd. "Once the story is set, the operation follows a pattern, so you may as well own a piece of the negative – even if you have to beg, borrow or steal to get your hands on it."

Martin Rackin hired John Twist to work on the script. Female lead Rossana Podestà had just made Helen of Troy. The jungle set cost $125,000. The film's sets were designed by the art director Edward Carrere.

According to Turner Classic Movies:

The celebrated Cuban poet, philosopher, and revolutionary patriot José Martí (Ernest Sarracino) also makes an appearance, although the real Martí had been dead and buried for three years by 1898, when this yarn takes place. We never see Antonio Maceo Grajales, the high-ranking liberation fighter supposedly waiting for the munitions in the Cuban village of Santiago, but again, the actual Maceo died in battle near the end of 1896. The historical blunders in Santiago were easily spotted and pointedly criticized by Cuban observers, and according to the entertainment trade paper Variety, a union of Cuban educators sent correct information to Warner Bros. via the American embassy, hoping to forestall such errors in the future. One hopes the studio took note, but anyone who knows Hollywood knows this was a very long shot.

== Release ==
The film's Latin America premiere was held in Santiago. A holiday was declared to mark the occasion.

== See also ==
- List of American films of 1956
