= The Boy from Oklahoma =

1954 film by Michael Curtiz

- Theatrical release poster
- Directed by: Michael Curtiz
- Written by: Frank Davis; Winston Miller
- Based on: The Sheriff Was Scared by Michael Fessier
- Produced by: David Weisbart
- Starring: Will Rogers Jr. Nancy Olson; Anthony Caruso
- Cinematography: Robert Burks
- Edited by: James Moore
- Music by: Max Steiner
- Production company: Warner Bros. Pictures
- Distributed by: Warner Bros. Pictures
- Release date: February 27, 1954
- Running time: 87 minutes
- Country: United States
- Language: English
- Box office: $1.4 million

The Boy from Oklahoma is a 1954 American Western film directed by Michael Curtiz and starring Will Rogers Jr., Nancy Olson and Anthony Caruso. It was produced and distributed by Warner Bros. Pictures.

== Plot ==
More skilled with a rope than a gun, Will Rogers jr as a man from Oklahoma who refuses a job as sheriff. He reconsiders and learns later the last sheriff was killed.

== Cast ==
- Will Rogers Jr. as Sheriff Tom Brewster
- Nancy Olson as Katie Brannigan
- Lon Chaney Jr. as Crazy Charlie
- Anthony Caruso as Mayor Barney Turlock
- Wallace Ford as Postmaster Wally Higgins
- Clem Bevans as Pop Pruty, Justice of the Peace
- Merv Griffin as Steve
- Louis Jean Heydt as Paul Evans
- Sheb Wooley as Pete Martin
- Slim Pickens as Shorty
- James Griffith as Joe Downey
- Tyler MacDuff as Billy the Kid
- Harry Lauter as Jim (uncredited)

== Background ==
The film became the basis for the 1957 Warner Bros. television series Sugarfoot, in which Will Hutchins replaced Rogers as lead character Tom Brewster. The movie features Lon Chaney Jr. and includes one of future TV talk show host Merv Griffin's few theatrical film roles. In the movie version, Rogers as Brewster substitutes facility with a twirling rope, similar to Will Rogers Sr.'s, for the usual unerring speed and accuracy with firearms typically found in cinematic cowboy heroes.

Three of the original cast members from the movie, Louis Jean Heydt, Sheb Wooley, and Slim Pickens, were transplanted directly into the subsequent TV show's pilot, "Brannigan's Boots", playing their roles from the movie; the first episode of Sugarfoot follows the film's script fairly faithfully. Dennis Hopper succeeded Tyler MacDuff as Billy the Kid in the television version, Merry Anders took over the part of Katie Brannigan from Nancy Olson, and Chubby Johnson replaced Wallace Ford as Wally Higgins for the small screen.

This was the last film made by Curtiz as a contract director at Warner Bros. He had worked exclusively at the studio since 1926.

== Reception ==
Reviewing the DVD release in 2013, Gene Triplett of The Oklahoman called the film an "amiable oater" with a plot that "may sound like potential corn on the cob to some" but turns out to be "unexpectedly well-crafted entertainment".
