= A Cry in the Night (1956 film) =

- Theatrical release poster
- Directed by: Frank Tuttle
- Screenplay by: David Dortort
- Based on: All Through the Night; 1955 novel by Whit Masterson
- Produced by: George C. Bertholon; Alan Ladd
- Starring: Edmond O'Brien; Brian Donlevy; Natalie Wood; Raymond Burr
- Narrated by: Alan Ladd
- Cinematography: John F. Seitz
- Edited by: Folmar Blangsted
- Music by: David Buttolph
- Production company: Jaguar Productions
- Distributed by: Warner Bros. Pictures
- Release dates: August 31, 1956 (New York City); October 10, 1956 (Los Angeles)
- Running time: 75 minutes
- Country: United States
- Language: English

A Cry in the Night is a 1956 American thriller film noir starring Edmond O'Brien, Brian Donlevy, Natalie Wood and Raymond Burr. Based on the 1955 Whit Masterson novel All Through the Night, it was produced and narrated by Alan Ladd and directed by Frank Tuttle.

A Cry in the Night was made for Ladd's production company Jaguar, although Ladd does not appear in the film.

== Plot ==
Eighteen-year-old Elizabeth "Liz" Taggart and her boyfriend Owen Clark visit a lovers' lane where childlike voyeur Harold Loftus secretly watches them. Loftus then knocks Owen unconscious and overpowers Liz, taking her to a shack.

A couple on a motorcycle try to revive Owen with liquor, but they leave when he does not awaken. Police arrive and mistakenly conclude that Owen is drunk. At the station, night-shift captain Ed Bates hears the story and realizes that Liz is the daughter of the day-shift captain Dan Taggart.

While holding Liz prisoner, Loftus kisses her. Loftus' mother Mabel phones police when her son does not return home. Liz seizes Loftus' gun but discovers that it is unloaded.

Taggart is furious with Owen, blaming him for what has happened, but Taggart's wife scolds her husband for intimidating their daughter to the point that she kept her romantic relationship secret. When the police officers find the shack, Owen ventures in alone, and when he finds Liz's shoe lying on the ground, he realizes that she had been taken there. Harried by the police, Loftus shoots an officer and forces Liz up a stairwell and over catwalks. Owen sees that Loftus is about to ambush Taggart and saves Taggart's life by leaping on Loftus at the last second. Taggart begins beating Loftus, who cries out for his mother.

After Loftus is taken into custody, Taggart invites Owen to accompany Liz back home.

== Cast ==
- Edmond O'Brien as Capt. Dan Taggart
- Brian Donlevy as Capt. Ed Bates
- Natalie Wood as Elizabeth "Liz" Taggart
- Raymond Burr as Harold Loftus
- Richard Anderson as Owen Clark
- Irene Hervey as Helen Taggart
- Carol Veazie as Mabel Loftus
- Mary Lawrence as Madge Taggart
- Anthony Caruso as Tony Chavez
- George J. Lewis as George Gerrity
- Peter Hansen as Dr. Frazee
- Tina Carver as Marie Holzapple
- Herb Vigran as Sgt. Jensen

== Production ==
=== Casting ===
Director Frank Tuttle had worked with Ladd on a number of occasions, most recently on Hell on Frisco Bay, a film starring Edward G. Robinson, who was initially discussed for the lead in A Covenant with Death. The cast includes Edmond O'Brien and Richard Anderson, who was Ladd's son-in-law and was borrowed from MGM. Brian Donlevy left a play commitment to appear in the film.

Natalie Wood was under contract to Warner Bros. Pictures. Many decades later, it was speculated that Wood may have lobbied to play the role partly as a means of exorcising personal demons from her own real-life rape. Wood was rumored to have had a romantic relationship with Raymond Burr during filming. In the 2016 book Natalie Wood: Reflections on a Legendary Life, Manoah Bowman stated that Wood had to "fight to be cast in A Cry in the Night after completing Rebel hoping to stretch her dramatic skills in a gritty psychological thriller" but that the film "proved to be a disappointment."

=== Screenplay ===
The film is based on the novel All Through the Night by Whit Masterson (pen name for Robert Wade and H. Bill Miller), which had appeared in Cosmopolitan. Anthony Boucher of The New York Times described the novel as "an intensely compact book ... and an unusually rich one," later writing that it was one of the best books of the year. According to Turner Classic Movies, several changes were made from the novel:

The girl in the book was knocked out early on and treated like a piece of furniture from then on. Her boyfriend wanted to help rescue her, but was sidelined by her bullying father, an unsympathetic brute in pursuit of an equally monstrous villain. There just wasn't much there for any actor to grab a hold of. David Dortort took the book's outline and reconfigured its details to make the characters more compelling: the sex fiend was now a repressed mamma's boy. This 32-year-old virgin has no other way to spend time with a woman aside from abducting her to a secret lair. And the object of his rapacious attention would no longer be an unconscious object, but a girl equally frustrated by the smothering attention of an overprotective parent, and capable of recognizing some humanity in her attacker. The boyfriend would no longer be relegated to the margins of the story, but would join the father in the hunt, where the two would have plenty of dramatic tension and mutual disrespect crackling between them.

== Release ==
A Cry in the Night premiered on August 31, 1956, at the RKO Palace Theatre in New York.

== Reception ==
In a contemporary review for The New York Times, critic Richard W. Nason called A Cry in the Night a "rather tasteless and makeshift melodrama."

Margery Adams of The Boston Globe wrote: "The film moves surprisingly slowly, considering the content of the plot ... Miss Wood appears unusually stupid in dealing with her captor—as a policeman's daughter it would seem that she should know a little more about using psychology on a mentally retarded misfit."

Wanda Hale of the New York Daily News wrote: "It's good advice the film gives but the story doesn't match it in sincerity. Too made-up are the situations and the suspense is weak, the denouement a foregone conclusion. And I cannot say that the acting is inspired."

== Home video ==
The film was released on DVD on July 26, 2016, by Warner Home Video on the Warner Archive Collection.

== See also ==
- List of American films of 1956
