= Drum Beat =

1954 film by Delmer Daves

- Theatrical release poster
- Directed by: Delmer Daves
- Written by: Delmer Daves
- Produced by: Delmer Daves; Alan Ladd (uncredited)
- Starring: Alan Ladd; Audrey Dalton; Marisa Pavan
- Cinematography: J. Peverell Marley
- Edited by: Clarence Kolster
- Music by: Victor Young
- Production company: Jaguar Productions
- Distributed by: Warner Bros. Pictures
- Release date: November 10, 1954
- Running time: 111 minutes
- Country: United States
- Language: English
- Budget: $1.1 million
- Box office: $3 million (US)

Drum Beat is a 1954 American CinemaScope Western film in WarnerColor written and directed by Delmer Daves and co-produced by Daves and Alan Ladd in his first film for his Jaguar Productions company. Ladd stars along with Audrey Dalton, Charles Bronson as Captain Jack, and Hayden Rorke as President Ulysses S. Grant.

The story uses elements of the 1873 Modoc War in its narrative, with Ladd playing a white man asked by the U.S. Army to attempt negotiations with Native Modocs who are about to wage war.

An early role for Charles Bronson (originally Buchinsky), who plays Captain Jack as a memorable villain wearing the coat of a deceased US Cavalry Captain. Prior to murdering General Edward Canby (Warner Anderson) during a peace negotiation, Bronson's character puts on a General's coat and announces to the audience "Me GENERAL Jack now!"

== Plot ==
In 1872, veteran Indian fighter Johnny MacKay (Alan Ladd) is sent for by then President Grant (Hayden Rorke). He tells government officials in Washington about hostilities between settlers, soldiers and Modoc renegades near the California and Oregon border. He is appointed peace commissioner for the territory.

On the way west, Johnny gives an escort to Nancy Meek (Audrey Dalton), a retired army colonel's niece. Nancy is traveling to a ranch owned by her aunt and uncle. There is an ambush outside Sacramento during which the sweetheart of their stage driver Bill Satterwhite is killed by a Modoc renegade. Later they find Nancy's aunt and uncle murdered and the ranch burned.

The grown children of an old Modoc chief, Toby (Marisa Pavan) and Manok (Anthony Caruso), meet Johnny at Fort Klamath. They tell Johnny it is a chief who calls himself Captain Jack (Charles Bronson) and a band of renegades who are responsible for the brutality while most of the other Modoc wish to live in peace. They both served as intermediaries for the Modoc.

Toby and Manok take Johnny and others to a peace talks near Lost River to discuss violations of the peace treaty signed by the Modoc in 1864 in hopes of bringing about peace again. When the violations are being discussed between Johnny and Captain Jack a vengeance crazed Satterwhite (Robert Keith) opens fire and kills the brave who killed his woman. A rampage results in which the renegades massacre 18 settlers. The Army responds but is unable to dislodge the renegade Modoc from their mountain stronghold and are forced to retreat with several casualties. After hearing of the massacre and the Army defeat President Grant orders General Canby's to act as a defensive force only.

Once more peace talks were arranged but Toby and Manok warn of treachery. General Canby (Warner Anderson), Dr. Thomas (Richard Gaines), a Modoc sympathizer, Johnny and friend Mr. Dyar (Frank Ferguson) are to come unarmed but Johnny and Mr. Dyar come armed with revolvers hidden under their shirts. During the negotiations Captain Jack pulls a hidden revolver and kills the General as other Modoc pull theirs and start firing. Dr. Thomas is also killed. Johnny is shot but only wounded and unconscious and is about to be scalped when Toby tries to shield him from harm and is killed. Mr. Dyar escapes in a hail of bullets. The Army responds causing Captain Jack and the other Modoc to retreat to their stronghold before Johnny can be killed.

President Grant is forced to act because of the public outcry and orders Johnny to do whatever is necessary to bring Captain Jack to justice. The renegades are eventually dislodged from their stronghold and are forced to split up into separate groups. Soon most of the Modoc surrender leaving Captain Jack to survive on his own. He and Johnny have a shootout and hand-to-hand combat. Johnny prevails and places him under arrest. Captain Jack is jailed, put on trial and sentenced to hang. Afterwards Johnny returns to the woman he has fallen in love with, Nancy.

== Cast ==
- Alan Ladd as Johnny MacKay
- Audrey Dalton as Nancy Meek
- Charles Bronson as Kintpuash / Captain Jack
- Marisa Pavan as Toby Riddle / Winema
- Strother Martin as Scotty
- Rodolfo Acosta as Scarface Charley
- Warner Anderson as General Edward Canby
- Willis Bouchey as General Gilliam (based on Jefferson C. Davis)
- Anthony Caruso (in brownface) as Manok
- Peggy Converse as First Lady Julia Grant
- Elisha Cook Jr. as Blaine Crackel
- Richard H. Cutting as Colonel Meek
- Michael Daves as Young Boddy (credited as Mike Lawrence)
- Frank DeKova as Jim "Modoc Jim"
- Frank Ferguson as Mr. Dyar
- Richard Gaines as Reverend Dr. Eleazar Thomas
- Peter Hansen as Lieutenant Goodsall
- Isabel Jewell as Lily White
- Robert Keith as Bill Satterwhite
- Pat Lawless as O'Brien
- George J. Lewis as Captain Alonzo Clark (credited as George Lewis)
- Perry Lopez as Charley "Bogus Charley"
- Hayden Rorke as President Ulysses S. Grant
- Edgar Stehli as Jesse Root Grant
- Rico Alaniz as Medicine Man (uncredited)
- Rayford Barnes as Captain Summer (uncredited)
- Frank Gerstle as Grant's Officer (uncredited)
- James Griffith as Veteran One-Legged Soldier At White House Gate (uncredited)
- Richard Hale as General William Tecumseh Sherman (uncredited)
- Kay E. Kuter as Veteran Soldier (uncredited)
- George Lloyd as Settler (uncredited)
- Victor Millan as Indian (uncredited)
- Carol Nugent as Nellie Grant (uncredited)
- Leonard Penn as Miller, Settler (uncredited)
- Denver Pyle as Fairchild (uncredited)
- Arthur Space as Army Doctor (uncredited)
- Paul Wexler as William Boddy (uncredited)

== Production ==
The film was announced in April 1954. It was the first production from Ladd's own company, Jaguar, which released through Warner Bros. Pictures. He made it after a spell of almost two years making films outside the USA.

Delmer Daves wrote the script based on his family's first hand knowledge of the Modoc Indians on the California-Oregon border in the 1870s.

The movie was filmed in the vicinity of Sedona, Arizona.

Marisa Pavan and Audrey Dalton were signed to three picture contracts with Jaguar. Dalton was borrowed from Paramount.

== Reception ==
According to Kinematograph Weekly it was a "money maker" at the British box office in 1955.

== Comic book adaptation ==
- Dell Four Color #610 (January 1955)

== See also ==
- List of American films of 1955
