= The Charge at Feather River =

1953 film by Gordon Douglas

- Promotional poster advertising the release of the film in 3-D
- Directed by: Gordon Douglas
- Written by: James R. Webb
- Produced by: David Weisbart
- Starring: Guy Madison; Frank Lovejoy; Helen Westcott; Vera Miles; Dick Wesson; Onslow Stevens; Steve Brodie; James Brown
- Cinematography: J. Peverell Marley
- Edited by: Folmar Blangsted
- Music by: Max Steiner
- Distributed by: Warner Bros. Pictures
- Release dates: June 30, 1953 (Vernon, Texas); July 11, 1953 (United States)
- Running time: 95 minutes
- Country: United States
- Language: English
- Box office: $3.65 million (US)

The Charge at Feather River is a 1953 American Western film directed by Gordon Douglas. It was originally released in 3D with many arrows, lances, and other weapons flying directly at the audience in several scenes.

The movie is most notable for originating the name of the "Wilhelm scream", a sound effect used in the Star Wars film series, as well as countless other movies including the Indiana Jones franchise, Disney cartoons and The Lord of the Rings film series. Sound designer Ben Burtt named the sound after "Pvt. Wilhelm", a minor character in the film who emits the famous scream after being shot by an arrow (although the recording actually originated in the Gary Cooper film Distant Drums in 1951). When the film screened at the Second World 3-D Expo at Hollywood's Egyptian Theatre in 2006, much of the film-savvy audience broke into applause when Pvt. Wilhelm screamed.

The climax of the film has many similarities to the 1868 Battle of Beecher Island, though instead of Army frontier scouts, Madison's character recruits "the Guardhouse Brigade" from Army prisoners and arms them with repeating rifles. Some have also noticed that the plot bears a number of similarities to the later Major Dundee, directed by Sam Peckinpah in 1965, notably the journey leading up to the climactic stand-off.

== Plot ==
In the post-Civil War era, a US Cavalry detachment at Colorado's Fort Bellows seeks the help of Union Army veteran Miles Archer to rescue two white women, Ann and Jennie, who were abducted by the Cheyenne. Forming a unit that includes a group of misfit soldiers, the abducted women's brother Johnny, the experienced Sergeant Baker and civilian illustrator Johnson, they voyage through hostile Cheyenne territory, encountering ambushes, spears, arrows, dehydration & an irate rattlesnake before a final battle on the banks of the Feather River.

== Cast ==
- Guy Madison as Miles Archer
- Frank Lovejoy as Sgt. Charlie Baker
- Helen Westcott as Anne McKeever
- Vera Miles as Jennie McKeever
- Dick Wesson as Pvt. Cullen
- Onslow Stevens as Grover Johnson
- Steve Brodie as Pvt. Ryan
- Ron Hagerthy as Johnny McKeever
- Fay Roope as Lt. Col. Kilrain
- Neville Brand as Pvt. Morgan
- Henry Kulky as Pvt. Smiley
- Lane Chandler as Pvt. Zebulan Poinsett
- Fred Carson as Chief Thunder Hawk
- James Brown as Pvt. Connors
- Ralph Brooke as Pvt. Wilhelm (scream voiced by Sheb Wooley)
