= Albert J. Cohen =

American film producer (1903–1984)

- Born: June 30, 1903; Baltimore, Maryland, U.S.
- Died: October 4, 1984 (aged 81); Los Angeles, California, U.S.
- Occupations: Producer, screenwriter
- Years active: 1934–1965 (film)

Albert J. Cohen (June 30, 1903 – October 4, 1984) was an American screenwriter and film producer. He worked at studios such as Republic and Universal Pictures. He was married to the actress Jeanne Sorel and their daughter Louise Sorel also became an actress.

== Filmography ==
=== Producer ===
- Who Killed Aunt Maggie? (1940)
- The Devil Pays Off (1941)
- Rookies on Parade (1941)
- Angels with Broken Wings (1941)
- Sailors on Leave (1941)
- Doctors Don't Tell (1941)
- Puddin' Head (1941)
- Sleepytime Gal (1942)
- Youth on Parade (1942)
- Lady for a Night (1942)
- Remember Pearl Harbor (1942)
- Pardon My Stripes (1942)
- Chatterbox (1943)
- Hit Parade of 1943 (1943)
- Sleepy Lagoon (1943)
- Thumbs Up (1943)
- Casanova in Burlesque (1944)
- Man from Frisco
- The Fighting Seabees (1944)
- Atlantic City (1944)
- Earl Carroll Vanities (1945)
- The Walls Came Tumbling Down (1946)
- Unknown Island (1948)
- Prehistoric Women (1950)
- Horizons West (1952)
- Because of You (1952)
- City Beneath the Sea (1953)
- Meet Me at the Fair (1953)
- East of Sumatra (1953)
- Girls in the Night (1953)
- The Glass Web (1953)
- The Veils of Bagdad (1953)
- The Great Sioux uprising (1953)
- Tanganyika (1954)
- Border River (1954)
- So This Is Paris (1954)
- Sign of the Pagan (1954)
- Playgirl (1954)
- The Second Greatest Sex (1955)
- Never Say Goodbye (1956)
- Outside the Law (1956)
- The Night Runner (1957)
- Istanbul (1957)
- Island of Lost Women (1959)

=== Screenwriter ===
- I Sell Anything (1934)
- A Night at the Ritz (1935)
- King Solomon of Broadway (1935)
- Times Square Lady (1935)
- Moonlight murder (1936)
- Invisible Enemy (1938)
- Let's Live a Little (1948)
- The Lady Pays Off (1951)
- The Naked Brigade (1965)

== Bibliography ==
- Bacher, Lutz. Max Ophuls in the Hollywood Studios. Rutgers University Press, 1996.
- Manchel, Frank. Film Study: An Analytical Bibliography, Volume 1. Fairleigh Dickinson Univ Press, 1990.
