= Hell on Frisco Bay =

1956 film by Frank Tuttle

- Theatrical release poster
- Directed by: Frank Tuttle
- Screenplay by: Sydney Boehm; Martin Rackin
- Based on: novel The Darkest Hour by William P. McGivern
- Produced by: George C. Bertholon
- Starring: Alan Ladd; Edward G. Robinson; Joanne Dru
- Cinematography: John F. Seitz
- Edited by: Folmar Blangsted
- Music by: Max Steiner
- Production companies: Jaguar Productions; Ladd Productions
- Distributed by: Warner Bros. Pictures
- Release date: January 28, 1956
- Running time: 99 minutes
- Country: United States
- Language: English
- Box office: $2 million (US)

Hell on Frisco Bay is a 1956 American CinemaScope film noir crime film directed by Frank Tuttle and starring Alan Ladd, Edward G. Robinson and Joanne Dru. It was made for Ladd's own production company, Jaguar.

The film featured an early Hollywood appearance by Australian actor Rod Taylor. His part was written especially by Martin Rackin, who worked with Taylor on Long John Silver (1954).

== Plot ==
After five years in San Quentin prison, former policeman Steve Rollins is released. Unjustly convicted of manslaughter in an arrested man's death, Steve is met by a friend from the force, Dan Bianco, and by wife Marcia, whom he shuns because she has been unfaithful to him.

Steve goes to the San Francisco waterfront looking for a fisherman named Rogani who supposedly has proof that can clear his name. The docks are run by racketeer Victor Amato, who is forcing out dock leader Lou Flaschetti. Two thugs who work for the mobster, Lye and Hammy, come to confront Steve, warning him not to take this any further. Rollins also discovers that the man who took his place on the police force, Connors, is on Amato's payroll.

Marcia tries to explain to Steve that she was lonely while he was in prison and cheated on him just once. He is reluctant to trust her. Rogani and Flaschetti, meantime, both end up dead. Steve manages to get valuable information from Amato's mild-mannered nephew, Mario, and when the henchman Hammy opens fire, Steve's cop friend Bianco kills him.

Lye is told by Amato to murder Mario, even though the boy is the mob boss's blood relative. Lye reluctantly follows orders, but when he discovers that Amato has, behind his back, made a pass at Kay Stanley, an actress Lye is in love with, then slapped her after being rejected, Lye is enraged. And so is Amato's long-suffering wife, Anna, who tells Steve where to find him. Amato tries to tie up loose ends by ordering Connors to kill Lye and make it look like the death was "in the line of duty". But Lye kills Connors instead, and rushes to the club headquarters to confront Amato.

With the cops closing in and others after him, Amato has decided to leave the country. In a showdown, Amato gets the better of Lye, then attempts to flee on a speedboat. Steve swims to the boat and fights with Amato on board. The boat crashes into a lighthouse. Amato, dazed and defeated, is taken into custody. Steve, his reputation restored, considers going back to police work and also giving Marcia a second chance.

== Cast ==
- Alan Ladd as Steve Rollins
- Edward G. Robinson as Victor Amato
- Joanne Dru as Marcia Rollins
- William Demarest as Dan Bianco
- Paul Stewart as Joe Lye
- Perry Lopez as Mario Amato
- Fay Wray as Kay Stanley
- Renata Vanni as Anna Amato
- Nestor Paiva as Louis Fiaschetti
- Stanley Adams as Hammy
- Willis Bouchey as Police Lieutenant Paul Neville
- Peter Hansen as Detective Connors (credited as Peter Henson)
- Anthony Caruso as Sebastian Pasmonick
- George J. Lewis as Father Larocca
- Peter J. Votrian as George Pasmonick (credited as Peter Votrian)
- Rod Taylor as John Brodie Evans (credited as Rodney Taylor)
- Tina Carver as Bessie Coster
- Mae Marsh as Mrs. Cobb, Steve Rollins' Landlady (uncredited)
- Jayne Mansfield as Mario's Nightclub Date

== Production notes ==
The film was based on the novel The Darkest Hour by William P. McGivern. Film rights were bought by Alan Ladd's Jaguar Productions in August 1954 as a vehicle for Ladd. The movie was financed by Warner Bros. Pictures, which had just made Drum Beat with Ladd.

The novel was serialized in Collier's magazine (April 15-May 13, 1955).

Ladd had wanted James Cagney to co-star but Edward G. Robinson was cast instead. Robinson was in what he called "the B picture phase of my career as a movie star – or former movie star if that's a better way of putting it, or has-been if that's still a better way." It was due to his greylisting. Robinson was unhappy being billed second to Ladd and dubbed the film "Hell in Beverly Hills.

Ladd hired Frank Tuttle to direct; Tuttle had cast Ladd in This Gun for Hire, the movie that made him a star.

Production Dates: April 4—mid-May, 1955. Much of the film was shot on location throughout San Francisco. Extensive shooting was done in and around Fisherman's Wharf and San Francisco Bay.

Stuntman Louis Tomei was doubling for Robinson in a fight scene on a motorboat that marked the climax of the movie. He was hurled against a metal fitting on the boat and received a severe head injury. He died in hospital later that night. Tomei was a former racing driver who had competed in the Indianapolis 500 in the 30s and 40s.

== Reception ==
Bosley Crowther, reviewing the film for The New York Times, wrote that "thanks to Edward G. Robinson, who wears his role as snugly as he wears his shoes, and to some sardonic dialogue written for him" the film was "two or three cuts above the quality of the run of pictures in this hackneyed genre."

== See also ==
- List of American films of 1956
