= Law and Order (1953 film) =

1953 film by Nathan Juran

- Theatrical film poster
- Directed by: Nathan Juran
- Written by: Inez Cocke (adaptation by)
- Screenplay by: John Bagni; Gwen Bagni; D.D. Beauchamp
- Based on: Saint Johnson; 1930 novel by W.R. Burnett
- Produced by: John W. Rogers
- Starring: Ronald Reagan; Dorothy Malone; Preston Foster
- Cinematography: Clifford Stine
- Edited by: Ted J. Kent
- Music by: Henry Mancini (uncredited)
- Color process: Technicolor
- Production company: Universal International Pictures
- Distributed by: Universal Pictures
- Release date: May 13, 1953 (Los Angeles)
- Running time: 80 minutes
- Country: United States
- Language: English
- Box office: $1 million (US)

Law and Order is a 1953 American Western film directed by Nathan Juran and starring Ronald Reagan, Dorothy Malone and Preston Foster.

== Plot ==
In 1882, sharp-shooting Deputy U.S. Marshal Frame Johnson (Ronald Reagan) apprehends a notorious outlaw called "The Durango Kid" and brings him back to Tombstone, Arizona for a fair trial. The whole town, including Frame's two younger brothers Luther (Alex Nicol) and Jimmy (Russell Johnson), heralds the two men's arrival. Although Frame and the law and order he has brought to Tombstone are widely respected, an angry mob quickly forms around the Cochise County Sheriff's Jail to lynch "The Kid". Facing them alone, Frame threatens to shoot anyone who enters the jail; even after Jimmy steps to the head of the crowd. Later, Frame tells Jimmy that he is tired of giving people something they do not appreciate, he's resigning from his position and that they're leaving town. He then visits his sweetheart Jeannie (Dorothy Malone) at her casino and, after he informs her that he has given up his job as a Deputy U.S. Marshal to run a ranch in Cottonwood, Arizona, she agrees to marry him.

The Johnson brothers leave Tombstone with their friend, Coroner Denver Cahoon (Chubby Johnson); planning to send for Jeannie as soon as they are settled. When they arrive in Cottonwood at the Cottonwood Saloon the next evening, their entrance is noted by local rancher Kurt Durlin (Preston Foster). Durlin had previously lost his hand when Frame had shot it off in a cattle-rustling raid. Durling, who now runs Cottonwood, vows revenge. Minutes later, Frame protects young Johnny Benton from the intimidation of Durling's son Bart. After Bart backs down, Durling slaps his son across the face for his cowardice. The next morning, Durling forces newspaper editor Martin to run a false editorial stating that Frame is a cold-blooded murderer who's "killed 40 men" and is posing as a lawman. Frame ignores it, but is drawn into a perilous situation when a mob gathers in the streets to lynch Johnny, who has killed Bart in self-defense. After Frame ensures that crooked Yavapai County, Arizona's County Sheriff Fin Elder (Barry Kelley) will take Johnny to jail in the next town, a group headed by Judge Williams asks Frame to take over the duty as Town Marshal and clean up Cottonwood, but Frame refuses.

He and his brothers travel to their ranch but, seeing how much work it needs, return to town. On the way back, they find Johnny's body hanging by a noose from a tree. When the Johnsons confront Sheriff Elder, he lies that he tried to protect Johnny and calls Frame a coward for not trying to take over as Cottonwood Town Marshal. In response, Jimmy punches Elder and Lute volunteers to be Town Marshal. Frame congratulates Lute but leaves for the ranch with Denver and Jimmy. A few days later, Jimmy is on the outskirts of the ranch when he spots a beautiful girl and follows her home. Even after he realizes that the girl, Maria Durling, is Kurt Durling's daughter and Frank's sister, he declares his affection for her.

Meanwhile, Durling and his oldest son Frank trick Lute to keep him occupied while they rustle cattle. When Lute finally asks Frame for help, his older brother insists that he would not return to his old life in law enforcement. That night at the saloon, Frank and his henchman Jed shoot Lute. Frame and Jimmy rush to town, arriving just in time to hear Lute apologize for his failure before dying. Furious with both the Durlings and Frame, Jimmy drinks heavily and stalks off to kill Frank but, Denver knocks him out with a bottle to keep him from getting hurt.

The next day, Frame takes the job and announces that he is the new Cottonwood Town Marshal and makes it illegal to carry a gun in Cottonwood Town limits. Although everyone at first refuses, Frame arrests a few men and when people see Judge Williams backing Frame legally, they comply. Back in Tombstone, Jeannie hears that Lute has died and immediately leaves for Cottonwood. There, she informs Frame that she no longer insists that he give up his law enforcement career. Later that day, Denver, who has locked Jimmy in the jail, agrees to let him out and Jimmy immediately grabs his gun. He races to Maria, but before they can flee together, Frank comes home. Trapped and frightened of Frank, Jimmy kills him. He and Maria rush to Frame's house to tell him about the incident. The Marshal forcibly locks Jimmy into the jail cell, promising him a fair trial.

Later that night, however, Durling sends Jed to release Jimmy from jail and, just as he had predicted, the next morning the Cottonwood townspeople assume that Frame has let his brother escape. Durling gathers a posse to chase Jimmy, but Frame demands to be the one to track his brother down. When Durling pulls out a gun he has hidden in his coat, an unarmed Frame fights back and the two struggle in the street. Suddenly, a stagecoach racing through the town square runs over Durling, after which Frame hops on a horse and takes off after Jimmy. Easily tracing Jimmy's drunken trail, Frame soon finds him in the hills. Jimmy pulls out a gun, but Frame climbs after him, urging him to turn himself in. At the top, Jimmy shoots Frame in the shoulder, but when his brother collapses, he races to Frame's side to rescue him. Judge Williams is trying to dissuade the men from going after Jimmy when both Frame and Jimmy return together. Sure that no jury will convict a man who has returned of his own will, Elder and Jed flee to California. As Maria embraces Jimmy, Frame takes off the Town Marshal badge and promises Jeannie that now, he is truly through with law enforcement.

== Cast ==
- Ronald Reagan as Frame Johnson Deputy U.S. Marshal turned Cottonwood, Arizona Town Marshal
- Dorothy Malone as Jeannie
- Preston Foster as Kurt Durling
- Alex Nicol as Luther "Lute" Johnson
- Ruth Hampton as Maria Durling
- Russell Johnson as Jimmy Johnson
- Barry Kelley as Yavapai County County Sheriff Fin Elder
- Chubby Johnson as Denver Cahoon
- Jack Kelly as Jed
- Dennis Weaver as Frank Durling
- Wally Cassell as The Durango Kid
- Richard Garrick as Judge Williams

== Production ==
This was the fourth time W.R. Burnett's story was adapted for a film by Universal, following the 1932, 1937, and 1940 versions.

Susan Cabot was originally meant to play Maria Durling, but backed out of the film due to dental surgery. Ruth Hampton was an entrant in a Miss Universe contest sponsored by Universal and was selected to fill that role; she would later appear in five other Universal-International films.

Russell Johnson remarks that Ronald Reagan was "very political," and that "he couldn't spend a minute without being very political." He and Reagan were on the different ends of the political spectrum but nonetheless, Johnson found Reagan to be an easy man to work with during filming.

This film was shot in Red Rock Canyon, California.

== Home media ==
Universal first released the film on VHS on January 19, 1999, under the Universal Western Collection label. On May 6, 2003, it was released to DVD under the same label and contained the original theatrical trailer as a bonus feature.

A licensed Blu-ray version was released for the first time on July 16, 2019, by Shout! Factory. This print contains 1080p high-definition video, theatrical trailer, an image gallery, and a poster gallery.
