= Calcutta (1947 film) =

1947 film by John Farrow

- Theatrical release poster
- Directed by: John Farrow
- Screenplay by: Seton I. Miller
- Produced by: Seton I. Miller
- Starring: Alan Ladd; Gail Russell; William Bendix
- Cinematography: John F. Seitz
- Edited by: Archie Marshek
- Music by: Victor Young
- Color process: Black and white
- Production company: Paramount Pictures
- Distributed by: Paramount Pictures
- Release date: April 23, 1947 (New York City)
- Running time: 83 minutes
- Country: United States
- Language: English
- Box office: $2.8 million (North American rentals); 1,220,580 admissions (France)

Calcutta is a 1947 American film noir crime film directed by John Farrow, written and produced by Seton I. Miller, and starring Alan Ladd, Gail Russell and William Bendix.

== Plot ==
In post-World War II Asia, three American pilots, Neale Gordon, Bill Cunningham and Pedro Blake fly a route from Chungking, China, to Calcutta, India. They live at the Hotel Imperial in Calcutta. When Neale and Pedro's aircraft is forced down in a mountainous area, Bill comes to the rescue.

At an engagement party, Bill's fiancée, Virginia Moore, tells Neale and Pedro that Bill has been strangled. Nightclub singer Marina Tanev says Eric Lasser, the nightclub owner canceled the engagement party on the night Bill was killed. Tearing an expensive diamond necklace from her neck, Neale confronts Virginia making her confess she was not in love with Bill.

During a flight to Chungking, Pedro meets Indian merchant Mul Raj Malik, who tells him to visit him at his import-export shop. In Calcutta, Mrs. Smith, a jewellery merchant, reveals Bill bought Virginia's necklace and deposited a $7,000 check before he died. Neale is still wary of Virginia's involvement in his friend's death and when he discovers a bag of jewels in the floorboards of one of their aircraft, he has to fight for his life.

Giving the jewels to Pedro, Neale returns to the hotel, hoping to catch the smugglers. Malik confronts him, but is shot as he leaves the room. When Neale shows a jewelled brooch to Marina, she warns that Virginia knows more about the night Bill died. Going to her room, Neale finds it has been ransacked and Virginia is missing.

British Indian Imperial Police led by Inspector Hendricks arrive to arrest Neale for Malik's murder. Pedro claims the gun that was used in Malik's murder was his. Neale is released and he pledges that he will find the real killer. Virginia contacts Neale and tells him she loves him, but he is still suspicious of her motives. When the hotel desk clerk who was there the night Bill was murdered contradicts Virginia's story, Neale wrings the truth out of her. She was part of the smuggling ring, with her role to get close to the pilots who were flying in and out of Calcutta, until Bill got wise to the scheme. She held a gun to Bill's temple but it was Lasser who strangled him.

Lasser bursts in, and Virginia tries to shoot him but is disarmed by Neale who kills Lasser during their struggle for the gun. Neale then calls in Hendricks who arrests Virginia, still professing her love for Neale. Later, when Marina goes to the airport, she tells Neale that tangling with mountains is safer than his dealing with women. The two embrace and kiss with Neale then setting off on his next flight.

== Cast ==
- Alan Ladd as Neale Gordon
- Gail Russell as Virginia Moore
- William Bendix as Pedro Blake
- June Duprez as Marina Tanev
- Lowell Gilmore as Eric Lasser
- Edith King as Mrs. Smith
- Paul Singh as Mul Raj Malik
- Gavin Muir as Inspector Kendricks
- John Whitney as Bill Cunningham
- Benson Fong as Young Chinese Clerk

== Production ==
=== Development ===
Calcutta in British India had frequently been in the news during World War II, and Paramount decided it would make an ideal setting for a film. Production of the movie was announced in late 1944. It was based on an original story by Seton I. Miller, who also acted as screenwriter and producer. Miller had been under contract to Paramount since 1942. Miller later said he devised the basic idea with a friend, Captain Frank "Dude" Higgs, former chief pilot of the China National Avitation Corporation; Higgs later died in a crash near Canton.

In December 1944, Alan Ladd and William Bendix, who had just appeared in Two Years Before the Mast (released 1946) for Miller, were announced as stars, playing pilots who flew over "the hump" from Calcutta to Chungking. Howard da Silva, who had co-starred several times with Ladd, was announced as a co-star but ended up not being in the final film. John Farrow, who had made two films with Ladd, was chosen to direct.

Herbert Coleman, assistant director, later wrote, "Most of the studios were turning out romanticized tales of what was called, back then, 'flying the hump,' and Paramount joined in. Seton I. Miller wrote an original screenplay that had little to do with flying the hump' but was right for a character Alan Ladd had been perfecting for himself."

The female lead was Gail Russell. Coleman, who had not seen her since 1942, wrote "Something had happened to her. The blue in her eyes seemed to have faded. She was no longer the eager, trusting young schoolgirl I’d met in 1942. I could also see that she was completely dominated by Farrow. She was too anxious to please him."

=== Shooting ===
Filming took place in June and July 1945. Four people were hired as special technical advisers: Joe Rosbert (a member of the Flying Tigers who crashed on "the hump"), Major Whyte (a veteran of the Eighth Burma Rifles), Mrs Madge Schofield (a former resident of Calcutta) and Dr Singh (a resident Hollywood expert on Indian affairs); the last two had small roles in the film.

Of the other cast members, June Duprez had suffered a career slump since moving to Hollywood following her appearance in The Thief of Bagdad but had been restored to some popularity since appearing in None But the Lonely Heart. Gail Russell had previously made Salty O'Rourke with Ladd. John Witney was from Little Theatre and was a protege of Alan Ladd. Edith King, who had just appeared in Broadway in Othello, made her film debut. 200 Indian seamen from the British Indian Navy were used as extras.

Coleman wrote "The Indians did lend a touch of reality to the picture, but using a little village street on the back lot of a little studio out in Culver City as Calcutta was a joke."

Coleman disapproved of John Farrow's directing style, writing:

He was cold, arrogant, and superior. He never seemed to know how he’d stage the action in a new set. He’d stroll in, swinging his cane (his affectation), hang it over his arm, and walk around the empty set gazing through the camera finder, trying to figure out what to do. He’d finally stop and tell the cameraman, the distinguished veteran Johnny Seitz, to put the camera there. Then he’d disappear into his stage dressing room to be joined later by some of the young and beautiful would-be actresses.

== Reception ==
Although the film was made in mid 1945, it was not released until April 1947. In between then Paramount made and released the Ladd vehicle O.S.S. (1946).

=== Box office ===
The film was a mid-size hit, earning North American rentals of $2.8 million by the end of 1947.

=== Critical response ===
When the film was first released, The New York Times film critic Thomas M. Pryor, gave the film a mixed review, writing:

There is just so much that an actor can do on his own to make a character interesting and then he must depend upon the scenarist to provide him with dialogue and situations which will keep the spectator on edge. In Calcutta, which opened yesterday at the Paramount. Alan Ladd is going through an all-too-familiar exercise. While the actor is giving a competent performance and is nicely abetted by William Bendix, the story by Seton I. Miller, who also produced the film for Paramount, is a sorry mess indeed.

The critic from the Los Angeles Times called the film "atmospheric and interest-holding" but thought that Gail Russell was miscast.

More recently, film critic Dennis Schwartz gave Calcutta a positive review, writing:

John Farrow's Calcutta is a fast-paced old-fashioned adventure yarn, shot entirely in Paramount's backlot. Seton Miller does the screenplay. It's an entertaining potboiler, though a minor work ... Ladd gives an icy action-hero performance as someone who revels in his disdain for women as untrustworthy companions. By Ladd's politically incorrect moves, he takes on the characteristics of the film noir protagonist--which gives this programmer its energy. Ladd quotes an ancient Hindu saying 'Man who trusts woman walk on duckweed over pond,' which tells us all we want to know about how he has stayed alive for so long while in the company of dangerous women, ones like Virginia, while Bill so easily succumbed to the beauty of the femme fatale.

== Adaptation ==
On February 9, 1950, The Screen Guild Theater, broadcast a 30 minute radio adaptation of the film with Alan Ladd and Gail Russell reprising their film roles.
