= Gail Russell =

American actress (1924–1961)

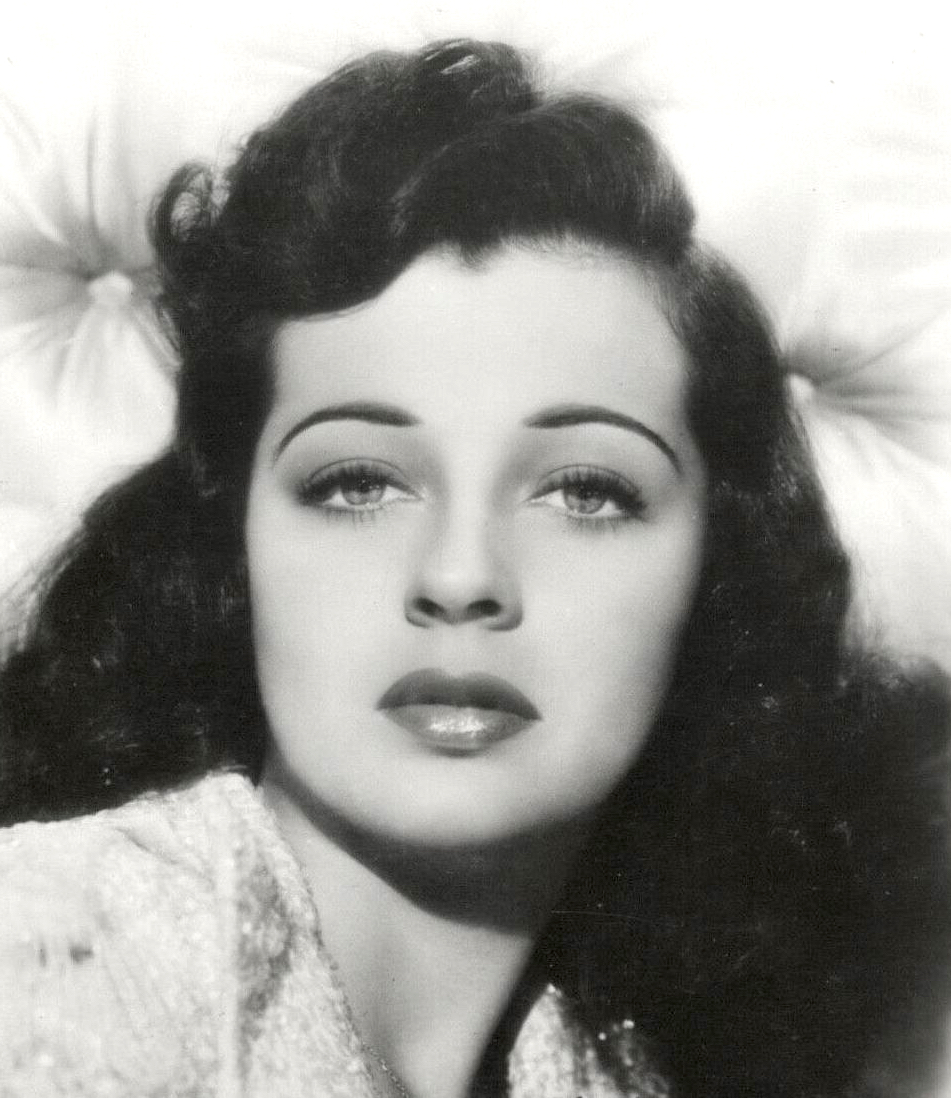
- Russell c. 1950s
- Born: Betty Gale Russell; September 21, 1924; Chicago, Illinois, U.S.
- Died: August 26, 1961 (aged 36); Los Angeles, California, U.S.
- Resting place: Valhalla Memorial Park Cemetery
- Occupation: Actress
- Years active: 1943–1961
- Known for: The Uninvited; Our Hearts Were Young and Gay
- Spouse: Guy Madison (m. 1949; div. 1954)
- Relatives: Wayne Mallory (brother-in-law)
- Awards: Hollywood Walk of Fame

Gail Russell (born Betty Gale Russell; September 21, 1924 – August 26, 1961) was an American film and television actress.

== Early years ==
Gail Russell was born to George and Gladys (Barnet) Russell in Chicago, and the family moved to the Los Angeles area when she was a teenager. Her father was initially a musician, but later worked for Lockheed Corporation. Before she ventured into acting, Russell had planned to be a commercial artist. Her beauty saw her dubbed "the Hedy Lamarr of Santa Monica."

== Career and life ==
Russell's beauty brought her to the attention of Paramount Pictures in 1942, and she signed a long-term contract with that studio when she was 18.

Russell later said, "Suddenly, there was this terrific amount of work for myself and no time to myself. It was that way for 10 years."

At the age of 19, Russell made her film debut in the 1943 film Henry Aldrich Gets Glamour. She also had a small part in Lady in the Dark (1943) and was meant to play a role in Henry Aldrich Haunts a House when, in March 1943, she was cast in a key role in The Uninvited (1944) with Ray Milland. Joan Mortimer played Russell's role in Henry Aldrich, instead.

=== Stardom ===
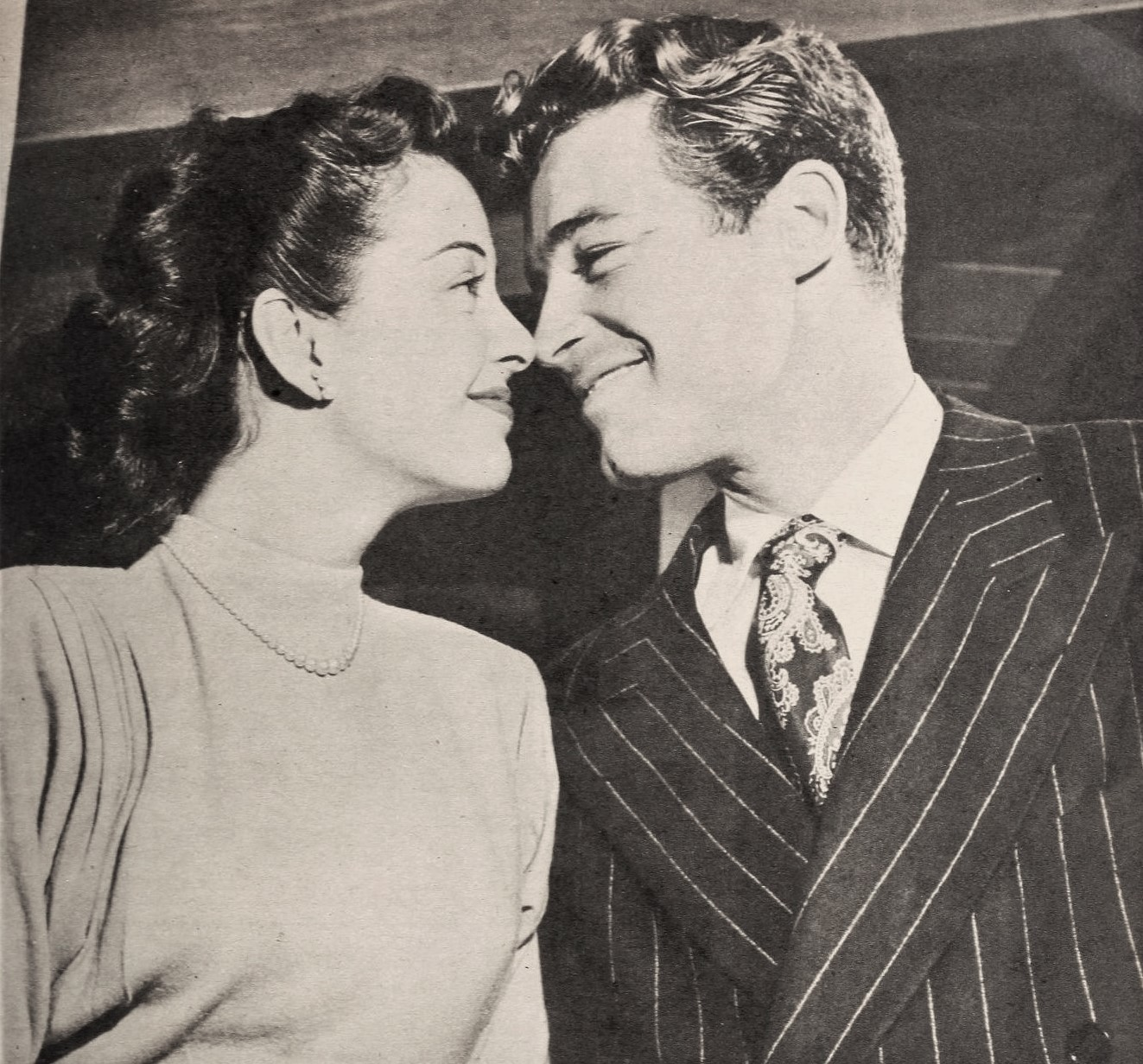
Gail Russell and her future husband Guy Madison, April 1946

The Uninvited was directed by Lewis Allen and was a big success. Producer Charles Brackett claimed in his diary that filming with Russell was difficult. Allen said that Ray Milland would take Russell aside and continuously practice her lines with her. Allen also said, "She could only do about five or six lines, and then she'd burst into tears." According to Allen, Russell, who had not drunk alcohol before, began drinking it to calm herself at the suggestion of the head of make-up on set.

According to the National Box Office Digest, it was among the highest-grossing pictures in the United States with rentals of over $500,000. A delighted Paramount announced Russell for Her Heart in Her Throat and True to the Navy with Eddie Bracken.

Allen directed Russell in Our Hearts Were Young and Gay (1944), in which she co-starred with Diana Lynn. It was another success.

Russell co-starred opposite Alan Ladd in Salty O'Rourke (1945), a horse-racing drama.

Her Heart in Her Throat became the third film Russell made with Allen, The Unseen (1945), an unofficial follow up to The Uninvited. True to the Navy became Bring On the Girls; Russell did not appear in that film.

Then Lynn and Russell were in Our Hearts Were Growing Up (1946), a sequel to Our Hearts Were Young and Gay. Paramount announced her as the female lead in The Virginian (1946), but she did not appear in the final movie.

She was reunited with Ladd in Calcutta (1947), shot in 1945, but not released until two years later. She made a cameo as herself in two all-star Paramount films, Duffy's Tavern (1945) and Variety Girl (1947).

=== Loan-outs ===
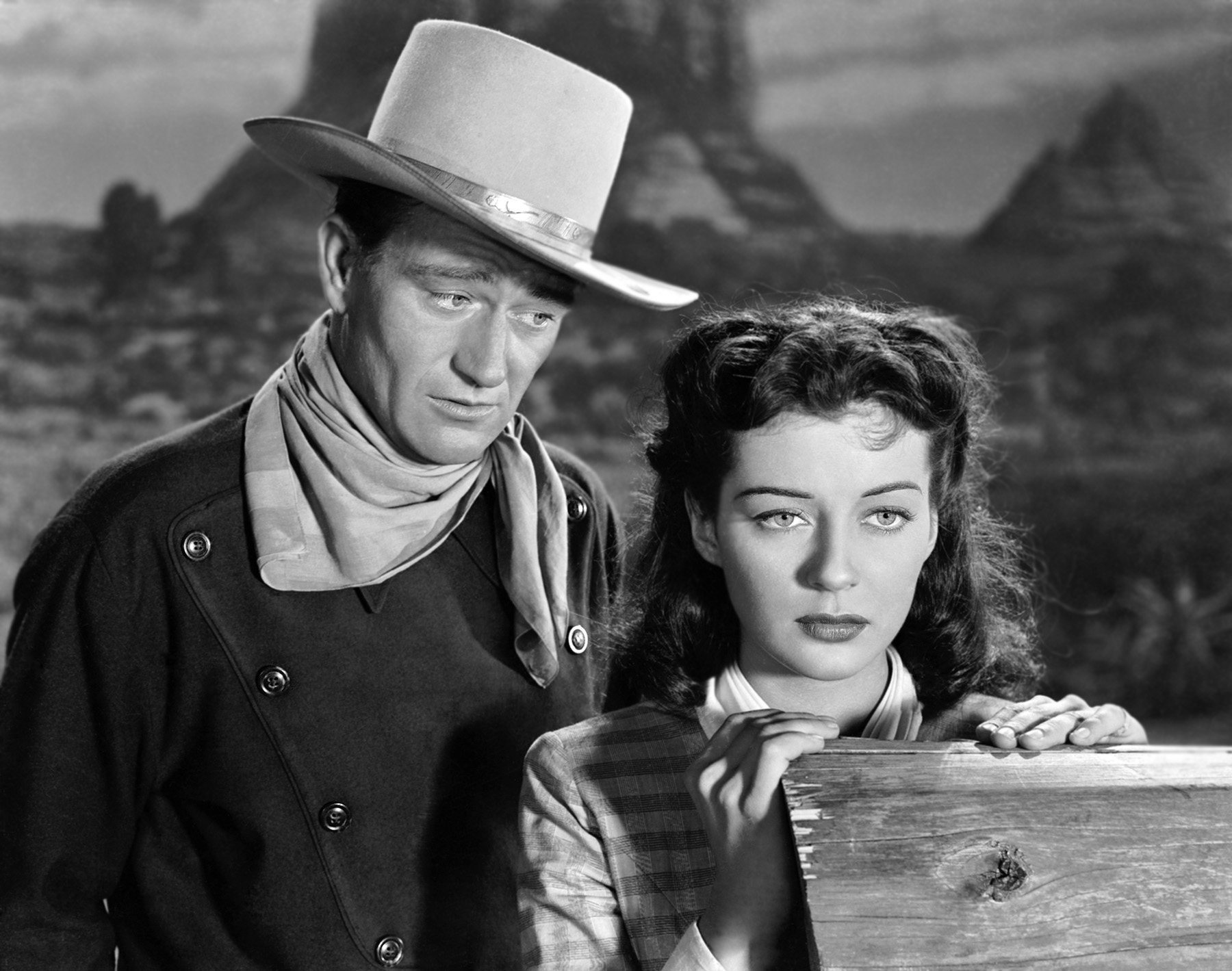
With John Wayne in Angel and the Badman (1947)

Russell was borrowed by Andrew Stone for The Bachelor's Daughters (1946) at United Artists.

Republic Pictures borrowed her to be John Wayne's leading lady in a film Wayne was producing, Angel and the Badman (1947). Also at Republic, she did Moonrise (1948) for Frank Borzage.

Russell returned to Paramount for Night Has a Thousand Eyes (1948), directed by John Farrow, who had made Calcutta. She reteamed with Wayne at Republic for Wake of the Red Witch (1948), which was a hit.

She appeared in a Western, El Paso (1949), with John Payne for Pine-Thomas Productions, a production outfit that released through Paramount.

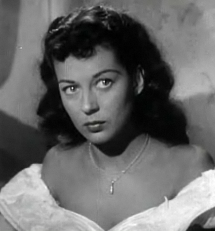
Screenshot of Gail Russell in Wake of the Red Witch (1948)

Russell did Song of India (1949) for Columbia and The Great Dan Patch (1949) for United Artists.

Russell married actor Guy Madison on 1 August 1949. They separated in less than six months, but later reunited, then separated in 1953, and divorced in 1954.

She made some more Pine-Thomas films: Captain China (1950) with Payne, and The Lawless (1951) with Macdonald Carey directed by Joseph Losey.

By 1950, she was well known to have a problem with alcohol. According to Yvonne de Carlo, actress Helen Walker took Russell "under her wing and introduced her to the tranquilizing benefits of vodka" when they were Paramount contractees together. Russell was already drinking on set by her third film, 1944's The Uninvited, to ease her paralyzing stage fright and lack of confidence. Paramount did not renew her contract.

She made Air Cadet (1951) for Universal.

=== Legal troubles ===
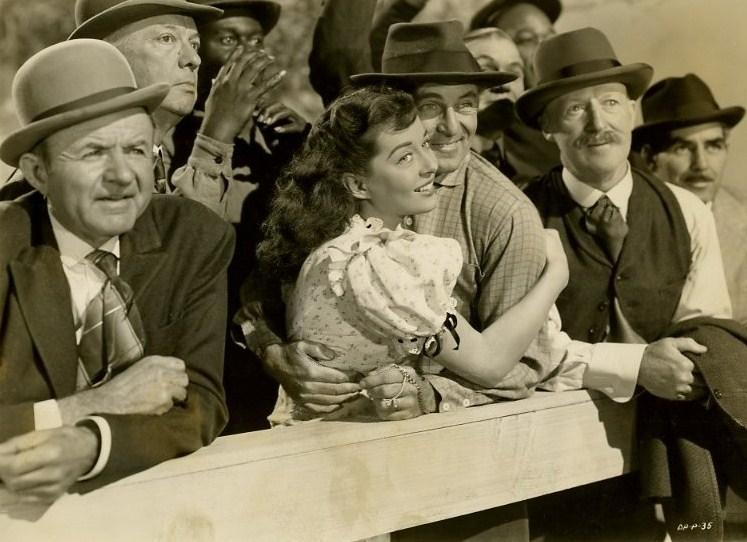
Gail Russell and John Hoyt (center) in The Great Dan Patch (1949)

In 1953, John Wayne's then-wife claimed during her divorce proceedings that Wayne and Russell had spent the night together. Wayne and Russell denied this.

In November 1953, she was held in jail overnight after being arrested for drunk driving. The following month, Madison and she separated permanently.

In January 1954, in a court in Santa Monica, California, Russell pleaded guilty to a charge of drunkenness, receiving a $150 fine (equivalent to $1,800 in 2025). The fine was in lieu of a jail sentence, with the provision that she not use intoxicants or attend night spots for two years. In the same court session, she received a continuance on a charge of driving while drunk.

She sued Madison for divorce in May 1954. The divorce was finalized in October 1954. During the court proceedings, Madison claimed that Russell would never do any housework and would not allow visitors or servants in the house.

In October 1954, she was admitted to a hospital in a coma after an attack of hepatitis.

In February 1955, she hit another car containing a couple and their baby while driving. She was fined $50. The couple later sued her for $30,000 (equivalent to $361,000 in 2025) and settled out of court.

=== Comeback ===
Russell returned to work in a co-starring role with Randolph Scott in the Western Seven Men from Now (1956), produced by her friend Wayne and directed by Budd Boetticher. The film and Russell's performance were lauded and she seemed poised to make a comeback.

Russell was expected to follow Seven Men from Now with Madame Courage, again with Boetticher as director, but the film was never made. Instead, Russell appeared in an episode of Studio 57 and had a substantial role in The Tattered Dress (1957).

In April 1957, she was found unconscious on the floor at her home.

On July 5, 1957, she was photographed by a Los Angeles Times photographer after she drove her convertible into the front of Jan's Coffee Shop at 8424 Beverly Boulevard, injuring a janitor. After failing a sobriety test, Russell was arrested and charged with driving under the influence. The janitor sued her for $75,000. She failed to appear at a court appearance, and was discovered at home passed out from drinking. She was fined $420, given a 30-day suspended sentence and put on three years' probation.

She appeared in No Place to Land (1958) for Republic.

She had roles in episodes of The Rebel and Manhunt. "I guess there are still a lot of doubts about me", she said in April 1960. "And this is one of the reasons why I want to get back to the business to prove to people I can do a picture. I'm stronger now. The future looks pretty good."

In November 1960, she was announced for a film with Mark Stevens and George Raft called Cause of Death but it appears to have not been made. She was top billed in her last film, the low-budget The Silent Call (1961).

== Death ==
Russell moved to a small house, where she lived alone. She periodically would try to stop drinking, then start again. On one occasion, Russell was hospitalized. On August 26, 1961, she was found dead at her residence in Brentwood, Los Angeles, California, at the age of 36. She was found by two neighbors who were concerned they had not seen her for several days. An empty vodka bottle was by Russell's side, and the house was full of empty bottles.

Russell died from liver damage attributed to "acute and chronic alcoholism" with aspiration of stomach contents as an additional cause. She was also found to have been suffering from malnutrition at the time of her death.

== Filmography ==
Year	Title	Role	Notes
1943	Henry Aldrich Gets Glamour	Virginia Lowry	Alternative title: Henry Gets Glamour
1944	Lady in the Dark	Barbara (at 17)	
1944	The Uninvited	Stella Meredith	
1944	Our Hearts Were Young and Gay	Cornelia Otis Skinner	
1945	Salty O'Rourke	Barbara Brooks	
1945	The Unseen	Elizabeth Howard	
1946	Our Hearts Were Growing Up	Cornelia Otis Skinner	
1946	The Bachelor's Daughters	Eileen	Alternative title: Bachelor Girls
1947	Angel and the Badman	Penelope Worth	Alternative title: Angel and the Outlaw
1947	Calcutta	Virginia Moore	
1948	Moonrise	Gilly Johnson	
1948	Night Has a Thousand Eyes	Jean Courtland	
1948	Wake of the Red Witch	Angelique Desaix	
1949	Song of India	Princess Tara	
1949	El Paso	Susan Jeffers	
1949	The Great Dan Patch	Cissy Lathrop	Alternative title: Ride a Reckless Mile
1950	Captain China	Kim Mitchell	
1950	The Lawless	Sunny Garcia	Alternative title: The Dividing Line
1951	Air Cadet	Janet Page	Alternative title: Jet Men of the Air
1956	Studio 57		Episode: "Time, Tide and a Woman"
1956	Seven Men from Now	Annie Greer	
1957	The Tattered Dress	Carol Morrow	
1958	No Place to Land	Lynn Dillon	Alternative title: Man Mad
1960	The Rebel	Cassandra	Episode: "Noblesse Oblige"
1960	Manhunt	Mrs. Clarke	Episode: "Matinee Mobster"
1961	The Silent Call	Flore Brancato	

== Radio appearances ==
Year	Program	Episode/source
1946	This Is Hollywood	The Bachelor's Daughters
