= Bagni =

Bagni (Italian for "baths") may refer to:

== Places ==
- Bagni, a frazione in Contursi Terme, Salerno, Italy
- Bagni, a frazione in Nocera Umbra, Perugia, Italy
- Bagni di Craveggia, a frazione in Craveggia, Verbano-Cusio-Ossola, Italy
- Bagni di Lucca, a comune in Lucca, Italy
- Bagni di Lusnizza, a frazione in Malborghetto Valbruna, Udine, Italy
- Bagni di Montecatini, a frazione in Montecatini Terme, Pistoia, Italy
- Agnone Bagni, a frazione in Augusta, Sicily, Syracuse, Italy
- Bagni San Filippo, a frazione in Castiglione d'Orcia, Siena, Italy
- Canicattini Bagni, a comune in Siracusa, Italy
- Lesignano de' Bagni, a comune in Parma, Italy
- Monticchio Bagni, a frazione in Rionero in Vulture, Potenza, Italy
- San Casciano dei Bagni, a comune in Siena, Italy
- Sclafani Bagni, a comune in Palermo, Italy

== Other ==
- Bagni (surname)
