= Bagni (surname) =

Bagni is a surname. Notable people with the surname include:

- Adam Bagni (born 1984), American journalist and sportscaster
- Giovanni Francesco Guidi di Bagno (1578–1641), Italian cardinal
- Gwen Bagni (1913–2001), American screenwriter and TV writer
- John Bagni (1910–1954), American actor and writer
- Leonard Bagni (1593–1650), Istrian priest, theologian, philosopher and professor
- Margherita Bagni (1902–1960), Italian actress and voice actress
- Ray Bagni (born 1970), American wrestler and promoter, known as Chubby Dudley
- Salvatore Bagni (born 1956), Italian footballer
