= Four Star Playhouse =

- Title card
- Genre: Anthology
- Created by: Four Star International
- Starring: David Niven; Charles Boyer; Dick Powell; Ida Lupino
- Music by: Theme No. 4: 'Four Star Emblem by Herschel Burke Gilbert
- Country of origin: United States
- No. of episodes: 129

Production
- Running time: 25 minutes
- Production company: Four Star International

Original release
- Network: CBS
- Release: September 25, 1952 – September 27, 1956

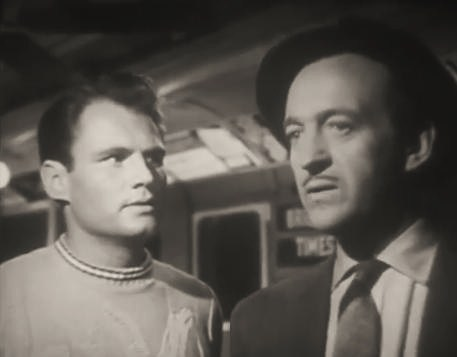
L–R: Adam Williams & David Niven in episode Night Ride (1953)

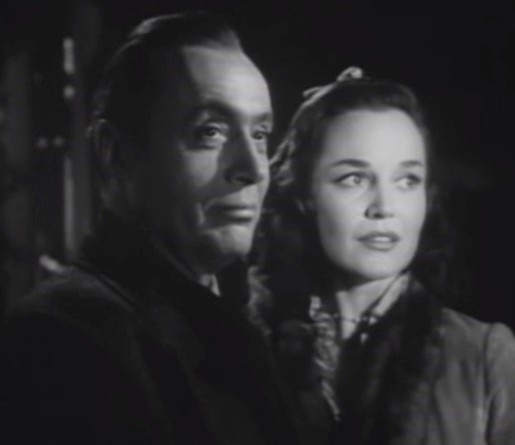
L–R: Charles Boyer and Dorothy Hart in episode "Second Dawn" (1954)

Four Star Playhouse (syndicated as Star Performance) is an American anthology series that ran from September 25, 1952, through September 27, 1956.

== Overview ==
Four Star Playhouse was owned by Four Star International. Its episodes ranged anywhere from surreal mysteries, such as "The Man on the Train", to light comedies, such as "The Lost Silk Hat".

The original premise for the program was that Charles Boyer, Dick Powell, Rosalind Russell, and Joel McCrea would rotate as stars of episodes. By the time it debuted, David Niven and Ida Lupino had replaced McCrea and Russell. In addition to those four stars, other performers, including Ronald Colman, Joan Fontaine, Frank Lovejoy, Merle Oberon, and Teresa Wright occasionally had leading roles. Colman's October 23, 1952, performance in "The Lost Silk Hat", which he adapted, was his television debut.

Powell portrayed the recurring character of illegal gambling-house operator Willie Dante. The character was later revamped and spun off to his own Dante series in 1960, starring Howard Duff.

== Cast ==
Many actors appeared in different roles in more than one episode, including

- Herb Vigran (15 episodes, 1952–1956)
- Regis Toomey (8 episodes, 1952–1956)
- Ralph Moody (7 episodes, 1953–1956)
- Robert Bice (7 episodes, 1954–1956)
- Ray Walker (6 episodes, 1952–1956)
- Christopher Dark (6 episodes, 1955–1956)
- Richard Hale (6 episodes, 1953–1956)
- Rhys Williams (6 episodes, 1952–1955)
- Joan Camden (5 episodes, 1953–1955)
- Alan Mowbray (5 episodes, 1955–1956)
- Richard Reeves (5 episodes, 1953–1955)
- William Forrest (5 episodes, 1953–1955)
- Dorothy Green (4 episodes, 1953–1956)
- Gene Hardy (4 episodes, 1953–1956)
- Ronald Colman (4 episodes, 1952–1954)
- Merle Oberon (4 episodes, 1953–1955)
- Beverly Garland (4 episodes, 1954–1956)
- Nestor Paiva (4 episodes, 1953–1955)
- Berry Kroeger (4 episodes, 1955–1956)
- Joseph Waring (4 episodes, 1954–1956)
- Walter Sande (4 episodes, 1952–1956)
- Walter Kingsford (4 episodes, 1953–1956)
- Hugh Beaumont (4 episodes, 1954–1956)
- Walter Coy (4 episodes, 1955–1956)
- Lewis Martin (4 episodes, 1954–1956)
- John Harmon (4 episodes, 1953–1954)
- John Doucette (4 episodes, 1954–1955)
- Alex Frazer (4 episodes, 1953–1956)
- William F. Leicester (4 episodes, 1952–1955)
- Sam Flint (4 episodes, 1954–1955)
- Brooks Benedict (4 episodes, 1952–1956)
- Barbara Lawrence (4 episodes, 1953–1956)
- Frank Lovejoy (3 episodes, 1953–1956)
- Joanne Woodward (3 episodes, 1954–1956)
- Jeanette Nolan (3 episodes, 1953–1956)
- Jean Howell (3 episodes, 1953–1955)
- Dick Foran (3 episodes, 1954–1955)
- James Seay (3 episodes, 1953–1956)
- Lawrence Dobkin (3 episodes, 1953–1955)
- Arthur Space (3 episodes, 1954–1956)
- Morris Ankrum (3 episodes, 1955–1956)
- Craig Stevens (3 episodes, 1953–1956)
- Joan Banks (3 episodes, 1953–1954)
- Ted Stanhope (3 episodes, 1954)
- Paul Bryar (3 episodes, 1954–1956)
- Herbert Lytton (3 episodes, 1954–1956)
- Noreen Nash (3 episodes, 1952–1955)
- Jean Willes (3 episodes, 1953–1955)
- Frances Rafferty (3 episodes, 1953–1954)
- Jay Novello (3 episodes, 1952–1955)
- Howard McNear (3 episodes, 1952–1955)
- Chuck Connors (3 episodes, 1954–1955)
- Edward Platt (3 episodes, 1954–1955)
- Harry Bartell (3 episodes, 1953–1956)
- John Hoyt (3 episodes, 1954–1956)
- Frank J. Scannell (3 episodes, 1954–1956)
- George Macready (3 episodes, 1952–1954)
- Don Shelton (3 episodes, 1954–1956)
- William Boyett (3 episodes, 1952–1955)
- Leonard Bremen (3 episodes, 1953–1954)
- John Alvin (3 episodes, 1953–1954)
- Claire Carleton (3 episodes, 1952–1954)
- Ross Elliott (3 episodes, 1954–1956)
- John Dehner (3 episodes, 1954–1955)
- Hugh Sanders (3 episodes, 1954–1955)
- Alexander Campbell (3 episodes, 1955–1956)
- Norbert Schiller (3 episodes, 1955–1956)
- Nolan Leary (3 episodes, 1956)
- Joan Fontaine (2 episodes, 1953–1955)
- Virginia Grey (2 episodes, 1952–1954)
- James Millican (2 episodes, 1953)
- Beverly Washburn (2 episodes, 1954–1956)
- Elisabeth Fraser (2 episodes, 1953)
- Maxine Cooper (2 episodes, 1956)
- Steven Geray (2 episodes, 1955)
- Tris Coffin (2 episodes, 1955–1956)
- Willis Bouchey (2 episodes, 1954–1956)
- Larry J. Blake (2 episodes, 1953–1954)
- Ellen Corby (2 episodes, 1953–1954)
- Alix Talton (2 episodes, 1953)
- Harry Lauter (2 episodes, 1956)
- Virginia Christine (2 episodes, 1953–1954)
- Ralph Peters (2 episodes, 1954–1956)
- Anthony Eustrel (2 episodes, 1954–1955)
- Irene Tedrow (2 episodes, 1955–1956)
- Tim Graham (2 episodes, 1955–1956)
- William Swan (2 episodes, 1956)
- Nick Dennis (2 episodes, 1953–1956)
- Lucille Barkley (2 episodes, 1953)
- Gloria Marshall (2 episodes, 1954–1956)
- Jimmy Baird (2 episodes, 1955)
- Frank Gerstle (2 episodes, 1953–1954)
- Jack Lomas (2 episodes, 1954)
- Jeanne Ferguson (2 episodes, 1956)
- Tony Dante (2 episodes, 1956)
- Martha Hyer (2 episodes, 1953–1954)
- Angela Lansbury (2 episodes, 1954–1955)
- Marguerite Chapman (2 episodes, 1954)
- Vera Miles (2 episodes, 1954)
- Hillary Brooke (2 episodes, 1952–1953)
- Stacy Harris (2 episodes, 1953–1956)
- Barbara Billingsley (2 episodes, 1953–1955)
- Hal Baylor (2 episodes, 1954–1955)
- Paul Picerni (2 episodes, 1954–1955)
- Robert J. Wilke (2 episodes, 1954–1955)

== Production ==
The show was sponsored in its first bi-weekly season by The Singer Company. Bristol-Myers became an alternate sponsor when it became a weekly series in the fall of 1953 (both sponsors' names alternated as part of the show's title in its initial broadcasts). From September 1952 through September 1954 it was broadcast on Thursdays from 8:30 to 9 p.m. Eastern Time. In October 1954, it was moved to 9:30 to 10 p.m. E. T. on Thursdays, remaining in that slot for the rest of its run.

While it never made the Nielsen Top 30, the ratings were sufficient to keep it on the air for four seasons. In 1954, Billboard magazine voted it the second best filmed network television drama series.

Blake Edwards was among the writers and directors who contributed to the series, making his debut as a director on the program in 1952.

The pilot for Meet McGraw, starring Frank Lovejoy, aired here (under that title, February 25, 1954), as did another episode in which Lovejoy recreated his role of Chicago newspaper reporter Randy Stone, from the radio drama Nightbeat (titled "Search in the Night", November 5, 1953).

=== Directors ===
Directors who worked on the show include

- Roy Kellino in 41 episodes (1953–1956)
- Robert Florey in 31 episodes (1952–1956)
- Richard Kinon in 7 episodes (1956)
- Robert Aldrich in 5 episodes (1953–1954)
- Blake Edwards in 5 episodes (1953–1954)
- Frank McDonald in 3 episodes (1954)
- Laslo Benedek in 3 episodes (1956)
- William Asher in 2 episodes (1954)
- William A. Seiter in 2 episodes (1955–1956)

=== Writers ===
Writers who worked on the show include:

- Gwen Bagni in 15 episodes (1952–1954)
- John Bagni in 13 episodes (1952–1954)
- Richard Carr in 13 episodes (1954–1956)
- Frederick Brady in 9 episodes (1954–1956)
- Blake Edwards in 7 episodes (1952–1954)
- Seeleg Lester in 5 episodes (1953–1954)
- Merwin Gerard in 4 episodes (1953)
- Frederick J. Lipp in 4 episodes (1954–1955)
- Larry Marcus in 3 episodes (1952–1954)
- Milton Merlin in 3 episodes (1952–1953)
- Marc Brandell in 3 episodes (1954–1956)
- László Görög in 3 episodes (1955–1956)
- James Bloodworth in 3 episodes (1956)
- Amory Hare in 2 episodes (1953)
- Octavus Roy Cohen in 2 episodes (1954–1955)
- Milton Geiger in 2 episodes (1954–1955)
- Thelma Robinson in 2 episodes (1954)
- Oscar Millard in 2 episodes (1955–1956)
- Willard Wiener in 2 episodes (1955)
- Robert Eggenweiler in 2 episodes (1956)
- Ida Lupino in 2 episodes (1956)
- Roland Winters in 2 episodes (1956)

== Syndication ==
Official Films syndicated reruns of Four Star Playhouse under the title Star Performance. In 1956 it was named the best syndicated dramatic show in Billboard's Fourth Annual Program and Talent Awards. Powell was named the best dramatic performer in the competition, and Niven took second place in that category.
