= Letter from a Friend =

1943 film

Letter from a Friend is a 1943 short film. It was a trailer to promote the Third War Loan Drive and starred Alan Ladd in his only film after he entered the army. Filming started September 9, 1942.
