= The Great Dan Patch =

1949 film by Joseph M. Newman

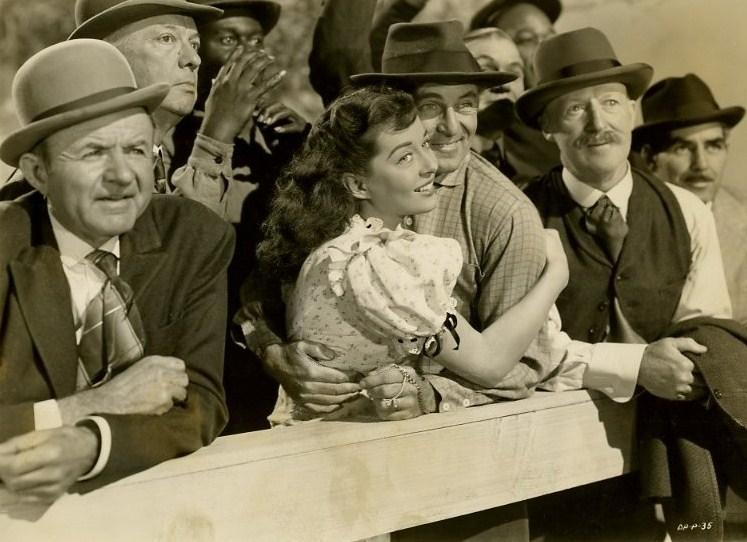
- Film still with Gail Russell and John Hoyt (center)
- Directed by: Joseph M. Newman
- Written by: John Taintor Foote
- Produced by: Edward Dein (associate producer); John Taintor Foote (producer); W. R. Frank (executive producer)
- Starring: See below
- Cinematography: Gilbert Warrenton
- Music by: Rudy Schrager
- Production company: W. R. Frank Productions
- Distributed by: United Artists
- Release date: November 8, 1949
- Running time: 94 minutes
- Country: United States
- Language: English

The Great Dan Patch is a 1949 American drama film directed by Joseph M. Newman about the pacing horse Dan Patch. The film is also known as Ride a Reckless Mile (American reissue title), and Dan Patch.

== Plot ==
In the 19th century's final decade, chemist David Palmer returns to Oxford, Indiana, after living in Chicago for a few years. He returns to marry school teacher Ruth Treadwell.

Upon his arrival, David receives a warm welcome from his father, Dan, who makes a living breeding race horses. Dan is disappointed, however, when David tells him they plan to move to Indianapolis. Ruth, who has looked forward to join the sophisticated social life in Chicago is also disappointed by the news.

Ruth is satisfied when they move to Indianapolis and buy land where David starts his new job. Soon, David visits Oxford to watch his father's new horse debut on the track. A mistake by the groom severely injures the horse, who can be used only for breeding thereafter.

Dan attempts to breed the horse with Joe Patchen, a reputable stud from Illinois, and the resulting colt is named Dan Patch. The colt grows into a strong horse, ready to train for the racetrack with trainer Ben Lathrop.

One day David gets a visit from Ben and his tomboy teenage daughter Cissy at the estate. Ruth, who has turned into a socialite with no interest in horses, treats the visitors poorly. Ben tells David that Dan Patch has made a record training run before he and his daughter leave.

David receives a telegram from his aunt Netty stating his father's illness. He rushes to Oxford and is by his father's side as he passes. David makes a promise to his dying father that he will continue training Dan Patch. He brings the horse to Indianapolis and builds a race track on the estate. Ruth is not happy with the development. As they quarrel, David realizes that he doesn't love her anymore.

However, the training is successful, and Dan Patch wins his first race at a county fair. Soon the horse is ready for big races, winning in Detroit, Cleveland and Columbus. In Kentucky, Ben becomes ill and David takes his place as a driver. Since the other drivers refuse to race, realizing their horse won't beat Dan Patch. The horse gets to race against time, and breaks the record, running a mile in under two minutes.

Because of trouble at David's regular work at the chemistry company, Ruth tells him to come home and solve it, not willing to risk her lifestyle. David sees no other alternative than to return to Indianapolis. When he goes to tell Ben and Cissy, he sees one of the younger drivers, Bud Ransome, talk to Cissy. Later, a fire breaks out in the stables. David and Cissy extinghuis it, saving the horses.

When David comes back to Ruth, he tells her he has decided to sell the estate, quit his job and continue breeding horses instead. She demands a divorce, refusing to live on the farm with him. Ruth gets most of their assets in the divorce, while David keeps the farm and Dan Patch. Cissy is overjoyed that he has returned, having had a crush on him for years.

David understands he is in love with young Cissy, and together they decide to sell Dan Patch for $60,000 to be able to live on the farm and continue breeding horses. David and Cissy eventually marry and are blessed with a daughter.

The horse goes on to break his own record, running a mile in 1 minute fifty-six seconds in 1906. He makes money from different commercial deals. In his last race, watched by David and his family, Dan Patch beats his own record by a full second.

One curiosity about the movie is that it was shown in the UK on BBC2 television at the same time as the 1966 World Cup Final between West Germany and England, thus providing alternative viewing to those who may have had little interest in the showpiece event being broadcast simultaneously on BBC1 and ITV.

== Cast ==
- Dennis O'Keefe as David Palmer
- Gail Russell as Cissy Lathrop
- Ruth Warrick as Ruth Treadwell
- Charlotte Greenwood as Aunt Netty
- Henry Hull as Dan Palmer
- John Hoyt as Ben Lathrop
- Arthur Hunnicutt as Chet Williams
- Clarence Muse as Voodoo
- Harry Lauter as Bud Ransome
- Visalia Abbe as Dan Patch, a Horse

== Soundtrack ==
- Clarence Muse - "Can't Get You Then - Can't Get You Now" (Written by Martin Broones)
- Clarence Muse - "Mixed Team" (Written by Alexander Laszlo)
- "My Old Kentucky Home, Good-Night" (Written by Stephen Foster)

== See also ==
- List of films about horses
- List of films about horse racing
