= Farewell to Kennedy =

- General Electric Theater episode
- Directed by: Frank Tuttle

"Farewell to Kennedy" is an episode of General Electric Theater. It starred Alan Ladd who made it hoping that the show would lead to a regular TV series. This did not happen.

The episode was directed by Frank Tuttle and starred Ladd.
