= Douglas Fairbanks Presents =

1950s anthology TV series

- Also known as: Rheingold Theater; Chesebrough Ponds Playhouse
- Genre: Anthology series
- Presented by: Douglas Fairbanks Jr.
- Starring: Douglas Fairbanks Jr. (48 episodes)
- Composer: Allan Gray
- Country of origin: United States
- Original language: English
- No. of seasons: 4
- No. of episodes: 157

Production
- Production locations: British National Studios, England
- Camera setup: Single-camera
- Running time: 25 minutes
- Production company: Douglas Fairbanks Jr. Productions

Original release
- Network: NBC
- Release: 7 January 1953 – 11 February 1957

Douglas Fairbanks Presents is a 1953–1956 syndicated half-hour dramatic anthology series. Douglas Fairbanks Jr. was the host, and he sometimes starred in episodes. It was also known as Douglas Fairbanks Jr. Presents. A total of 157 episodes were filmed. The program was also broadcast in at least seven TV markets in Canada.

== Actors ==
The series offered Buster Keaton in his first dramatic role in the episode entitled "The Awakening". British actor Christopher Lee appeared in various roles in sixteen episodes, including "Destination Milan".

== Production ==
Fairbanks was executive producer for the program, which was filmed at the British National Studios, Elstree, England and on location in England and in other parts of Europe. NBC Films was the original distributor, but by mid-1954, it had begun distributing a package titled Paragon Playhouse, while Interstate TV distributed episodes with the original title.

Herman Blaser was the production supervisor, and Lawrence Huntington was the director. John and Gwen Bagni wrote the scripts. Music for the show was composed by Allan Gray.

== Recognition ==
In 1954, Douglas Fairbanks Presents was named the best non-network dramatic film series in The Billboard's Second Annual TV awards.

== Other titles ==
The program had different titles in different areas. Those titles often included the name of the sponsor, such as Rheingold Theatre (when Rheingold Brewery sponsored it in New York City and at least 15 other locations) and Triangle Theatre (based on sponsor Blatz Beer's logo) in Wisconsin. In Melbourne, Australia the series was aired under the title Chesebrough Ponds Playhouse.

== Episodes ==
=== Season 1 (1953–1954) ===
No. overall	No. in series	Title	Directed by	Written by	Original release date
1	1	"The Accused"	Lawrence Huntington	Gwen Bagni, John Bagni	7 January 1953
2	2	"The Scream"	Charles Saunders	John Cresswell, Hester Holland	14 January 1953
3	3	"Little Brother"	Charles Saunders	Doreen Montgomery	21 January 1953
4	4	"The Clock"	Lance Comforrt	Paul Vincent Carroll	28 January 1953
5	5	"Dialogue With Two Faces"	Charles Saunders	Unknown	4 February 1953
6	6	"The Surgeon"	Terence Fisher	Lawrence B. Marcus, Richard Alan Simmons	11 February 1953
7	7	"Lochinvar"	Leslie Arliss	Walter Scott	18 February 1953
8	8	"Take A Number"	Terence Fisher	Lawrence B. Marcus	25 February 1953
9	9	"Thought To Kill"	Leslie Arliss	Selwyn Jepson	4 March 1953
10	10	"Happy Birthday"	Bernard Knowles	Lawrence B. Marcus	11 March 1953
11	11	"The Five Pound Note"	Bernard Knowles	Lawrence B. Marcus, Robert Westerby	18 March 1953
12	12	"Destination Milan"	Lawrence Huntington	Lawrence Huntington, Robert Hall	25 March 1953
13	13	"Foolish Notions"	Charles Saunders	Gabrielle Upton	1 April 1953
14	14	"American Duel"	Lance Comfort	Nelson Gidding, Doreen Montgomery, Robert Westerby	8 April 1953
15	15A	"The Last Moment"	Lance Comfort	Selwyn Jepson	15 April 1953
16	15B	"The Sensible Man"	Lance Comfort	Vincent Carroll	15 April 1953
17	16	"Parlour Trick"	Lawrence Huntington	Roland Pertwee	22 April 1953
18	17	"Outpost"	Dan Birt	Unknown	29 April 1953
19	18	"My Name Is Jones"	Charles Saunders	Selwyn Jepson	6 May 1953
20	19	"A Lodging For The Night"	Bernard Knowles	Lawrence B. Marcus, Robert Louis Stevenson	13 May 1953
21	20	"Priceless Pocket"	Leslie Arliss	Guy Morgan, Geoffrey Wallace	20 May 1953
22	21	"Sylvia"	John Gilling	Doreen Montgomery	27 May 1953
23	22	"The Red Dress"	Lawrence Huntington	Rhys Davies, Guy Morgan	3 June 1953
24	23	"The Runaway Marriage"	Leslie Arliss	Unknown	10 June 1953
25	24	"The Journey"	Charles Frank	Albert Jarosy	17 June 1953
26	25	"Lowland Fling"	Leslie Arliss	Paul Vincent Carroll	24 June 1953
27	26	"Emerald Green"	Lawrence Huntington	Paul Vincent Carroll	1 July 1953
28	27	"The Genie"	Lance Comfort	Doreen Montgomery	8 July 1953
29	28	"The Heel"	Lance Comfort	Noel Charles, Peter Graham Scott, Gordon Wellesley	15 July 1953
30	29	"My Favourite Aunt"	Lance Comfort	Unknown	22 July 1953
31	30	"The Door"	Charles Saunders	Lawrence B. Marcus, Guy Morgan	9 September 1953
32	31	"The Great White Bird"	John Gilling	Simon Harcourt-Smith, Moie Charles, Derry Quinn	23 September 1953
33	32	"Forever My Heart"	Leslie Arliss	Selwyn Jepson, Doreen Montgomery	30 September 1953
34	33	"Moment Of Truth"	Lance Comfort	Doreen Montgomery	7 October 1953
35	34	"Silent Snow"	Charles Saunders	Derry Quinn	21 October 1953
36	35	"Bitter Heart"	Bernard Knowles	Guy Morgan, Albert Jarosy	4 November 1953
37	36	"The Death Of Michael Turbin"	Bernard Knowles	Paul Vincent Carroll, Lawrence B. Marcus	18 November 1953
38	37	"Panic"	Lawrence Huntington	Lawrence B. Marcus, Peter Quinn	9 December 1953
39	38	"The Charm"	Lance Comfort	Unknown	30 December 1953
40	39	"The Silent Man"	Terence Fisher	Gil Doud, Robert Westerby, Lewis Rusoff	27 January 1954

=== Season 2 (1954-1955) ===
No. overall	No. in series	Title	Directed by	Written by	Original release date
41	1	"King High"	Terence Fisher	Andrew Solt, Glen Bohannax	3 February 1954
42	2	"Gramma Brenn"	Lawrence Huntington	Mildred Cram	10 February 1954
43	3	"The Ship's Doctor"	Derek Twist	Val Valentine	17 February 1954
44	4	"The Wedding Veil"	Charles Saunders	Lothian Daggett	24 February 1954
45	5	"Pardon My Ghost"	Leslie Arliss	Guy Morgan	3 March 1954
46	6	"The Trap"	Arthur Crabtree	Gabrielle Upton, Doris Gilbert	10 March 1954
47	7	"Second Wind"	Leslie Arliss	Jerome Gruskin	17 March 1954
48	8	"Leave To Die"	Derek Twist	A.R. Rawlinson, Mark Derby	24 March 1954
49	9	"The International Settlement"	Lawrence Huntington	Capt W.E. Johns, A.R. Rawlinson	31 March 1954
50	10	"Double Identity"	Francis Searle	John Haggerty, Aubrey Cash, Charles Hatton	14 April 1954
51	11	"The Refugee"	Michael McCarthy	Michael McCarthy	21 April 1954
52	12	"A Lesson In Love"	Leslie Arliss	Unknown	28 April 1954
53	13	"Myra And The Moneyman"	Michael McCarthy	Van Fleming, Leigh Vance	5 May 1954
54	14	"The Heirloom"	John Gilling	John Kneubuhl	12 May 1954
55	15	"The Witness"	Lawrence Huntington	Lee Edwards	19 May 1954
56	16	"Johnny Blue"	Lance Comfort	Jerome Gruskin	26 May 1954
57	17	"Street Of Angels"	Arthur Crantree	Paul Erickson, Guy Morgan, Robin Estridge	2 June 1954
58	18	"The Happy McBains"	Derek Twist	Nathaniel Curtis	9 June 1954
59	19	"Rain Forest"	Lawrence Huntington	J.B.Williams, Dorothy Cottrell	16 June 1954
60	20	"Provincial Lady"	Lance Comfort	Miles Malleson, Ivan Turgenev	30 June 1954
61	21	"The Awakening"	Michael McCarthy	Lawrence B. Marcus, Nikolay Gogol	14 July 1954
62	22	"The Apples"	Lance Comfort	Stanley Mann	21 July 1954
63	23	"Pattern For Glory"	Derek Twist	Abby Mann, Bernard Drew	4 August 1954
64	24	"A Line In The Snow"	Michael McCarthy	Gabrielle Upton	18 August 1954
65	25	"One-Way Ticket"	Lawrence Huntington	Paul Bauman	25 August 1954
66	26	"Dream Stuff"	Charles Saunders	Gabrielle Upton	8 September 1954
67	27	"Four Farewells In Venice"	Michael McCarthy	Charles Frank	22 September 1954
68	28	"Mr Sampson"	Lawrence Huntington	John Sherman	29 September 1954
69	29	"The Man Who Heard Everything"	Allan Davis	Lawrence B. Marcus	13 October 1954
70	30	"The Last Knife"	Michael McCarthy	Michael McCarthy	20 October 1954
71	31	"Rehearsal"	Lance Comfort	John Q. Copeland	3 November 1954
72	32	"Face Of The Law"	Lance Comfort	Sewlyn Jepson, Lance Sieveking	10 November 1954
73	33	"The Relative Truth"	Leslie Arliss	Paul Vincent Carroll	24 November 1954
74	34	"The Lovely Place"	Leslie Arliss	Gabrielle Upton	8 December 1954
75	35	"The Mix-Up"	Anthony Young	Unknown	15 December 1954
76	36	"Silent Night: The Story Of The Original Christmas Carol"	Lawrence Huntington	Frank Gruber	22 December 1954
77	37	"Stand By"	Derek Twist	Doreen Montgomery	29 December 1954
78	38	"Forever Is A Long Time"	Lawrence Huntington	Gabrielle Upton, Tedwell Chappman	12 January 1955
79	39	"Border Incident"	Derek Twist	George Marrow	26 January 1955

=== Season 3 (1955) ===
No. overall	No. in series	Title	Directed by	Written by	Original release date
80	1	"The Patriarch"	Michael McCarthy	Derry Quinn, Claire Wallis, Maxwell Sellers	2 February 1955
81	2	"The Hideaway"	Arthur Crabtree	Stanley Mann	9 February 1955
82	3	"The 90th Day"	Terence Fisher	Malvin Wald, Jack Jacobs	16 February 1955
83	4	"Counterfeit"	Roy Rich	Abby Mann, Howard Apter, Guy Morgan	23 February 1955
84	5	"Honeymoon Deferred"	Dennis Vance	Lorraine Edwards	2 March 1955
85	6	"The Long White Line"	John Gilling	John Francis Larkin, John Gilling, Guy Morgan	9 March 1955
86	7	"The Dark Lake"	Roy Rich	Ashmead Scott	16 March 1955
87	8	"Pitfall"	Roy Rich	Kent Doone	23 March 1955
88	9	"Con Cregan's Legacy"	Harold Huth	Paul Vincent Carroll, Charles Lever	6 April 1955
89	10	"Crime A La Carte"	Dennis Vance	Stanley Mann	13 April 1955
90	11	"Room 506"	Arthur Crabtree	James Patrick O'Neill	20 April 1955
91	12	"The Thoroughbred"	Harold Huth	Kent Doone, Guy Morgan	27 April 1955
92	13	"While The Circus Passes"	Lawrence Huntington	John Haggarty	4 May 1955
93	14	"The Leprachaun"	Lawrence Huntington	Derry Quinn, John Sherman	11 May 1955
94	15	"The Little Big Shot"	Lance Comfort	William Wiener, Herbert Abbott Spiro	18 May 1955
95	16	"The Auction"	Bernard Knowles	Stanley Mann	25 May 1955
96	17	"The Only Son"	Michael McCarthy	Unknown	1 June 1955
97	18	"Goodbye Tomorrow"	Bernard Knowles	John Gilling, Leigh Vance	8 June 1955
98	19	"Another Day"	Arthur Crabtree	Jerome Gruskin	15 June 1955
99	20	"Flight One-Zero-One"	Derek Twist	Maurice Wiltshire, Derek Twist	29 June 1955
100	21	"The Wedding Dress"	Roy Rich	Gizi de Blore Zsemley	13 July 1955
101	22	"The Enchanted Doll"	Harold Huth	Derry Quinn, Paul Gallico	20 July 1955
102	23	"Tony"	Lawrence Huntington	Guy Morgan, John Tully	3 August 1955
103	24	"Blue Murder"	Roy Rich	Emery Bonett, Guy Morgan	24 August 1955
104	25	"The Sound Of Your Voice"	Leslie Arliss	Unknown	31 August 1955
105	26	"Big Nick"	Lance Comfort	Unknown	7 September 1955
106	27	"The Milkman"	Lance Comfort	Lawrence B. Marcus	14 September 1955
107	28	"The Treasure Of Urbano"	Harold Huth	Paul Tabori, Derry Quinn	28 September 1955
108	29	"Atlantic Night"	Derek Twist	Leslie Reade, Arthur Bryant	5 October 1955
109	30	"The Hero"	Harold Huth	Abby Mann, Ben Arbeid	12 October 1955
110	31	"Success Train"	Dennis Vance	Abby Mann, Jack Wilson	7 November 1955
111	32	"Guilt"	Lance Comfort	James Parish	14 November 1955
112	33	"A Borderline Case"	Roy Rich	Guy Morgan	21 November 1955
113	34	"Heritage"	Lance Comfort	Joseph Schull	5 December 1955
114	35	"The Immigrant"	Michael McCarthy	Michael McCarthy	12 December 1955
115	36	"A Fast Buck"	Dennis Vance	Berkeley Mather, Guy Morgan	2 January 1956
116	37	"Dmitrios"	Dennis Vance	Derry Quinn, Norman Holland	16 January 1956
117	38	"Deadline: Vienna"	Harold Huth	Kent Doone	23 January 1956
118	39	"Gabrielle"	Bernard Knowles	Peter Pitt	30 January 1956

=== Season 4 (1956-57) ===
No. overall	No. in series	Title	Directed by	Written by	Original release date
119	1	"Better Mousetraps"	Harold Huth	Pauline Stone, Michael Cosgrove	6 February 1956
120	2	"The Present"	Lawrence Huntington	Michael Voysey	13 February 1956
121	3	"Jason's House"	Derek Twist	Jerry McGill	20 February 1956
122	4	"No Samples"	Cy Roth	Bill Barrett	27 February 1956
123	5	"A Walk In The Wilderness"	Arthur Crabtree	Montagu Slater, Guy Morgan	5 March 1956
124	6	"Welcome My Wife"	Leslie Arliss	E.G. Cousins, Derry Quinn	12 March 1956
125	7	"First Day"	Harold Huth	Paul Dudley, Bernard Glemser	19 March 1956
126	8	"A Flight Of Birds"	Arthur Crabtree	Timothy Hanley, Guy Morgan	26 March 1956
127	9	"Personal Call"	Michael McCarthy	Unknown	2 April 1956
128	10	"A New Life"	Arthur Crabtree	Dan Harris, Guy Morgan	9 April 1956
129	11	"The Dunce"	Arthur Crabtree	Clock Dailey, Guy Morgan	23 April 1956
130	12	"Ship Day"	Derek Twist	Johan Fabricius, Guy Morgan, Derek Twist	30 April 1956
131	13	"The Murderer"	Harold Huth	Stanley Mann, Guy Morgan	7 May 1956
132	14	"Point Of View"	Leslie Arliss	Paul David, Guy Morgan	14 May 1956
133	15	"Mutiny"	Arthur Crabtree	Patrick Whyte	28 May 1956
134	16	"The Story Of Pan Yusef"	Harold Huth	Ferdynand Goetel, Guy Morgan	4 June 1956
135	17	"A Train To The Sea"	Derek Twist, Leslie Arliss	Hugh Walpole, Leslie Arliss	11 June 1956
136	18	"A Likely Story"	Michael McCarthy	A.R. Rawlinson, Jean Leslie	25 June 1956
137	19	"Play Me A Blue Note"	Harold Huth	Anne Howard Bailey, Guy Morgan	2 July 1956
138	20	"The Way Home"	Harold Huth	Anne Howard Bailey	9 July 1956
139	21	"Mister Purley's Profession"	Leslie Arliss	Jack Roche	23 July 1956
140	22	"Treasure In Store"	Harold Huth	Claude Pirkis, Derry Quinn	20 August 1956
141	23	"Beloved Stranger"	Harold Huth	I.A.R. Wylie, Diana Morgan	3 September 1956
142	24	"The Guy In The Middle"	Derek Twist	Marion Cooper	10 September 1956
143	25	"Timmy The Shanks"	Harold Huth	Paul Vincent Carroll	17 September 1956
144	26	"The Man Who Wouldn't Escape"	Michael McCarthy	Stanley Mann, Mordecai Richler	1 October 1956
145	27	"Winning Sequence"	Leslie Arliss	Leslie Arliss, Margery Sharp	8 October 1956
146	28	"The Last Tour"	Derek Twist	Ann Howard Bailey	15 October 1956
147	29	"Someone Outside"	Lance Comfort	Martin Worth	22 October 1956
148	30	"One Can't Help Feeling Sorry"	Harold Huth	Frank D. Gilroy	29 October 1956
149	31	"Crown Of The Andes"	Francis Searle	Edward Dunn	5 November 1956
150	32	"Homecoming"	Joseph Sterling	Joseph Schull	12 November 1956
151	33	"Rendezvous At Dawn"	Arthur Crabtree	Charles Early, Joseph Early	19 November 1956
152	34	"Scheherezade"	Harold Huth	Irving Rubine, Selwyn Jepson	26 November 1956
153	35	"To What Great Heights"	Harold Huth	Paul Dudley, Guy Morgan	3 December 1956
154	36	"The Best Man"	Derek Twist	Irene Winston	14 January 1957
155	37	"The Ludlow Affair"	David Macdonald	Irving Rubine, Herman C. McNeile	28 January 1957
156	38	"The Trouble With Destiny"	Barry Delmaine	Eugene Vale	4 February 1957
157	39	"Together"	Lance Comfort	Paul David	11 February 1957

== Archive status ==
Out of a total of 157 episodes, 50 episodes are currently missing:

- Series 1 Episode 01 "The Accused" (missing)
- Series 1 Episode 02 "The Scream" (missing)
- Series 1 Episode 03 "Little Brother" (missing)
- Series 1 Episode 04 "The Clock" (missing)
- Series 1 Episode 05 "Dialogue For Two Faces" (missing)
- Series 1 Episode 07 "Lochinvar" (missing)
- Series 1 Episode 08 "Take A Number" (missing)
- Series 1 Episode 09 "Thought To Kill" (missing)
- Series 1 Episode 10 "Happy Birthday" (missing)
- Series 1 Episode 11 "The Five Pound Note" (missing)
- Series 1 Episode 12 "Destination Milan" (missing)
- Series 1 Episode 15A "The Last Moment" (missing)
- Series 1 Episode 15B "The Sensible Man" (missing)
- Series 1 Episode 16 "The Parlour Trick" (missing)
- Series 1 Episode 17 "The Outpost" (missing)
- Series 1 Episode 18 "My Name is Jones (missing)
- Series 1 Episode 19 "A Lodging For The Night" (missing)
- Series 1 Episode 20 "The Priceless Pocket" (missing)
- Series 1 Episode 21 "Sylvia" (missing)
- Series 1 Episode 22 "The Red Dress" (missing)
- Series 1 Episode 23 "Runaway Marriage" (missing)
- Series 1 Episode 24 "The Journey" (missing)
- Series 1 Episode 26 "Emerald Green" (missing)
- Series 1 Episode 27 "The Genie" (missing)
- Series 1 Episode 28 "The Heel" (missing)
- Series 1 Episode 30 "The Door" (missing)
- Series 1 Episode 31 "The Great White Bird" (missing)
- Series 1 Episode 32 "Forever My Heart" (missing)
- Series 1 Episode 33 "Moment Of Truth" (missing)
- Series 1 Episode 35 "Bitter Heart" (missing)
- Series 1 Episode 36 "The Death Of Michael Turbin" (missing)
- Series 1 Episode 37 "Panic" (missing)
- Series 1 Episode 38 "The Charm" (missing)
- Series 2 Episode 17 "Street Of Angels" (missing)
- Series 2 Episode 25 "One Way Ticket" (missing)
- Series 2 Episode 28 "Mr. Sampson" (missing)
- Series 2 Episode 37 "Stand By" (missing)
- Series 3 Episode 01 "The Patriarch" (missing)
- Series 3 Episode 03 "The 90th Day" (missing)
- Series 3 Episode 08 "Pitfall" (missing)
- Series 3 Episode 09 "Con Cregan's Legacy" (missing)
- Series 3 Episode 10 "Crime A La Carte" (missing)
- Series 3 Episode 11 "Room 506" (missing)
- Series 3 Episode 25 "The Sound Of Your Voice" (missing)
- Series 3 Episode 31 "Success Train" (missing)
- Series 3 Episode 33 "Borderline Case" (missing)
- Series 3 Episode 38 "Deadline: Vienna" (missing)
- Series 4 Episode 18 "A Likely Story" (missing)
- Series 4 Episode 24 "Guy In The Middle" (missing)
- Series 4 Episode 34 "Scheherezade" (Sound only exists – there is no picture).

In September 2024, A copy of "Myra And The Money Man" (Series 2 Episode 13) was located in Archives Canada by missing episodes hunter Ray Langstone.

In December 2024, A copy of "Together" (Series 4 Episode 39) was located by Film Is Fabulous in the collection of film collector David Moore. They also found better quality copies of existing episodes "The Story of Pan Yusuf" (Series 4 Episode 16) and "Silent Snow" (Series 1 Episode 34).

In April 2025, Ray Langstone announced that he had located a digital copy of 'The Surgeon' online the previous month.
