= The Bachelor's Daughters =

1946 film by Andrew L. Stone

- Theatrical release poster
- Directed by: Andrew L. Stone
- Screenplay by: Andrew L. Stone; Frederick J. Jackson
- Produced by: Andrew L. Stone
- Starring: Gail Russell; Claire Trevor; Ann Dvorak; Adolphe Menjou; Billie Burke; Jane Wyatt; Eugene List
- Cinematography: Theodor Sparkuhl
- Edited by: W. Duncan Mansfield
- Music by: Heinz Roemheld
- Production company: Andrew L. Stone Productions
- Distributed by: United Artists
- Release date: September 6, 1946
- Running time: 88 minutes
- Country: United States
- Language: English
- Budget: $1 million

The Bachelor's Daughters is a 1946 American comedy film directed by Andrew L. Stone and written by Stone and Frederick J. Jackson. It stars Gail Russell, Claire Trevor, Ann Dvorak, Adolphe Menjou, Billie Burke, Jane Wyatt and Eugene List. The film was released on September 6, 1946, by United Artists.

== Plot ==
A department store floorwalker is persuaded by four husband-seeking salesgirls to pose as their father in a Long Island mansion which they have rented by pooling resources and pretending to be wealthy themselves

== Cast ==
- Gail Russell as Eileen MacFarland
- Claire Trevor as Cynthia Davis
- Ann Dvorak as Terry Wilson
- Adolphe Menjou as Alexander Moody
- Billie Burke as Molly Burns
- Jane Wyatt as Marta Jordan
- Eugene List as Schuyler Johnson
- Damian O'Flynn as Rex Miller
- John Whitney as Bruce Farrington
- Russell Hicks as John Llewelyn Dillon
- Earle Hodgins as Dr. Johnson
- Madge Crane as Mrs. Johnson
- Bill Kennedy as Mr. Stapp
- Richard Hageman as Mr. Johnson
- Igor Dicga as Dancer
- Clayton Moore as Bill Cotter

== Radio adaptation ==
The Bachelor's Daughters was presented on This Is Hollywood November 16, 1946. Russell and Menjou reprised their film roles in the adaptation, which also starred Gail Patrick.
