= Alan Ladd =

American actor (1913–1964)

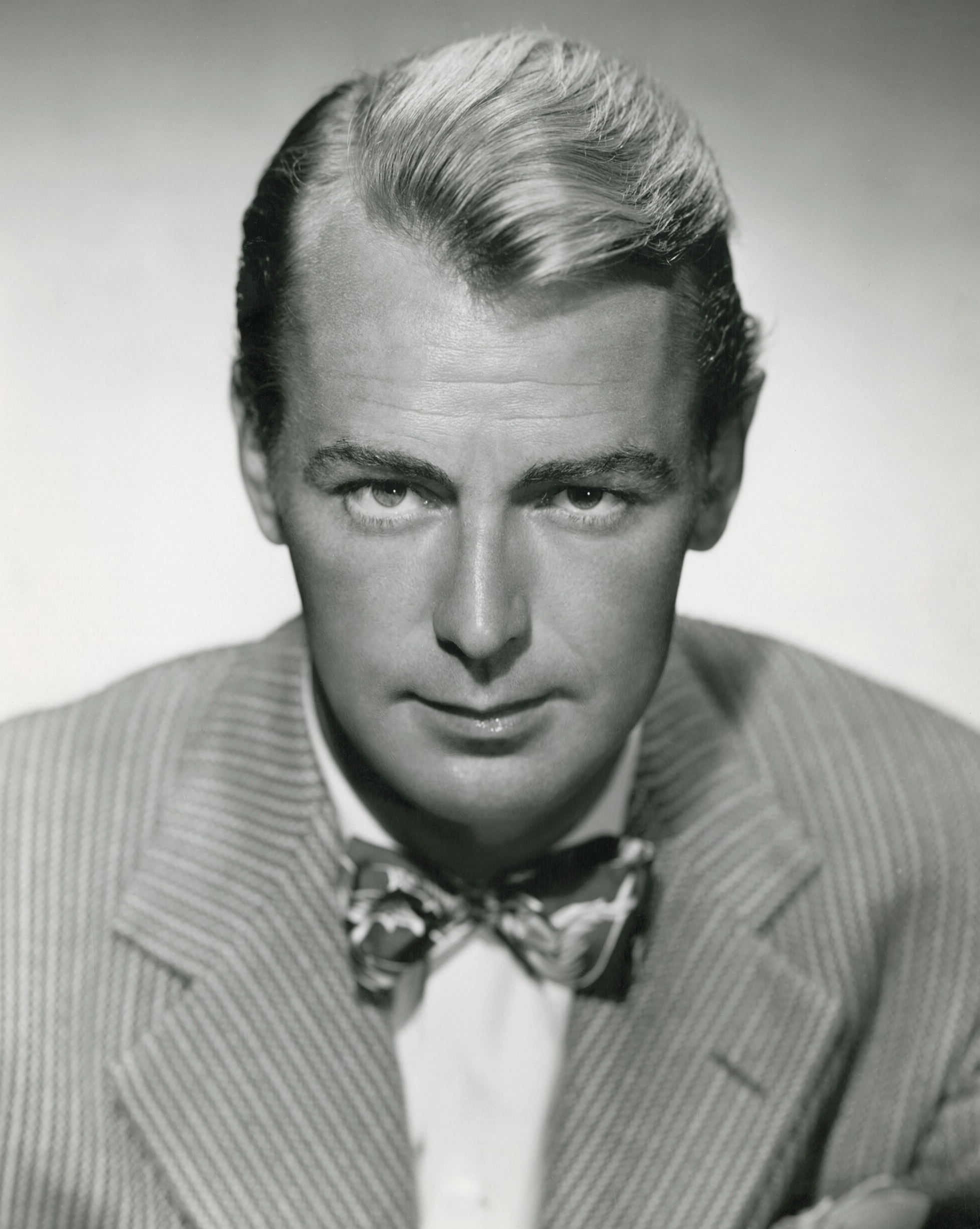
- Ladd c. 1944
- Born: Alan Walbridge Ladd; September 3, 1913; Hot Springs, Arkansas, U.S.
- Died: January 29, 1964 (aged 50); Palm Springs, California, U.S.
- Occupations: Actor; film producer
- Years active: 1932–1964
- Height: 5 ft 6 in (168 cm)
- Spouses: Marjorie Jane Harrold (m. 1936; div. 1941) Sue Carol (m. 1942)
- Children: 3, including Alan Jr. and David Ladd
- Relatives: Jordan Ladd (granddaughter)
- Website: www.cmgww.com/stars/alan-ladd/

Alan Walbridge Ladd (September 3, 1913 – January 29, 1964) was an American actor and film producer. Ladd found success in film in the 1940s and early 1950s, particularly in films noir and Westerns. He was often paired with Veronica Lake in films noir, such as This Gun for Hire (1942), The Glass Key (1942), and The Blue Dahlia (1946). Whispering Smith (1948) was his first Western and color film, and Shane (1953) was noted for its contributions to the genre. Ladd also appeared in 10 films with William Bendix.

His other notable credits include Two Years Before the Mast (1946) and The Great Gatsby (1949). His popularity diminished in the mid-1950s, though he continued to appear in numerous films, including his first supporting role since This Gun for Hire in the smash hit The Carpetbaggers, which was released posthumously in April 1964.

== Biography ==
Ladd was born in Hot Springs, Arkansas, on September 3, 1913. He was the only child of Ina Raleigh (also known as Selina Rowley) (1888–1937), and Alan Ladd (1874–1917), a freelance accountant. His mother was English, from County Durham, and had migrated to the U.S. in 1907 when she was 19. His father died of a heart attack when Ladd was four. On July 3, 1918, young Alan accidentally burned down the family home while playing with matches. His mother moved to Oklahoma City, where she married Jim Beavers, a house painter (d. 1936).

In the early 1920s, an economic downturn led to Ladd's family moving to California, which took four months. They lived in a migrant camp in Pasadena, California, at first and then moved to the San Fernando Valley, where Beavers went to work at FBO Studios as a painter.

Ladd enrolled in North Hollywood High School on February 18, 1930. He became a high-school swimming and diving champion and participated in high-school dramatics in his senior year, including the role of Ko-Ko in The Mikado. His diving skills led to his appearance in the aquatic show Marinella in July 1933.

=== Early career ===
Ladd's performance in The Mikado was seen by a talent scout. In August 1933, Ladd was one of a group of young "discoveries" signed to a long-term contract with Universal Pictures. The contract had options that could continue for seven years, but they were all in the studio's favor. Ladd appeared unbilled in Once in a Lifetime (1932), but the studio eventually decided Ladd was too blond and too short, and it dropped him after six months. (All of Ladd's fellow "discoveries" eventually were dropped, including a young Tyrone Power.)

At 20, Ladd graduated from high school on February 1, 1934. He worked in the advertising department of the San Fernando Sun Valley Record, becoming the newspaper's advertising manager. When the paper changed hands, Ladd lost his job. He sold cash registers and borrowed $150 to open his own hamburger and malt shop, across from his previous high school, which he called Tiny's Patio (his nickname at high school was Tiny), but he was unable to make a success of the shop.

In another attempt to break into the film industry, Ladd went to work at Warner Bros. as a grip and stayed two years. He was injured falling off a scaffold and decided to quit.

Ladd managed to save and borrow enough money to attend an acting school run by Ben Bard, who had taught him when he was under contract at Universal. Ladd appeared in several stage productions for Bard. Bard later claimed Ladd "was such a shy guy he just wouldn't speak up loud and strong. I had to get him to lower his voice, too; it was too high. I also insisted that he get himself a decent set of dentures."

In 1936, Ladd played an unbilled role in Pigskin Parade. He had short-term stints at MGM and RKO, and got regular professional acting work only when he turned to radio. Ladd had worked to develop a rich, deep voice ideal for that medium, and in 1936, he was signed by station KFWB as its sole radio actor. He stayed for three years at KFWB, working as many as 20 shows per week.

=== Earning an agent ===
One night, Ladd was playing the roles of a father and son on radio when he was heard by the agent Sue Carol. She was impressed and called the station to talk to the actors, and was told they were only one person. She arranged to meet him and, impressed by his looks, she signed him to her books and enthusiastically promoted her new client in films and on radio. Ladd's first notable part under Carol's management was the 1939 film Rulers of the Sea, in which he played a character named Colin Farrell, at $250 per week. He also received attention for a small part in Hitler – Beast of Berlin (1939).

Ladd tested unsuccessfully for the lead in Golden Boy (1939), but obtained many other small roles in films, such as the serial The Green Hornet (1940), Her First Romance (1940), The Black Cat (1941), and the Disney film The Reluctant Dragon (1941). Most notably, he had a small, uncredited part in Citizen Kane, playing a newspaper reporter toward the end of the film.

Ladd's career gained extra momentum when he was cast in a featured role in Joan of Paris (1942), a wartime drama made at RKO. It was only a small part, but it involved a touching death scene that brought him attention within the industry. RKO eventually offered Ladd a contract at $400 per week. However, he soon received a better offer from Paramount.

=== This Gun for Hire and stardom ===
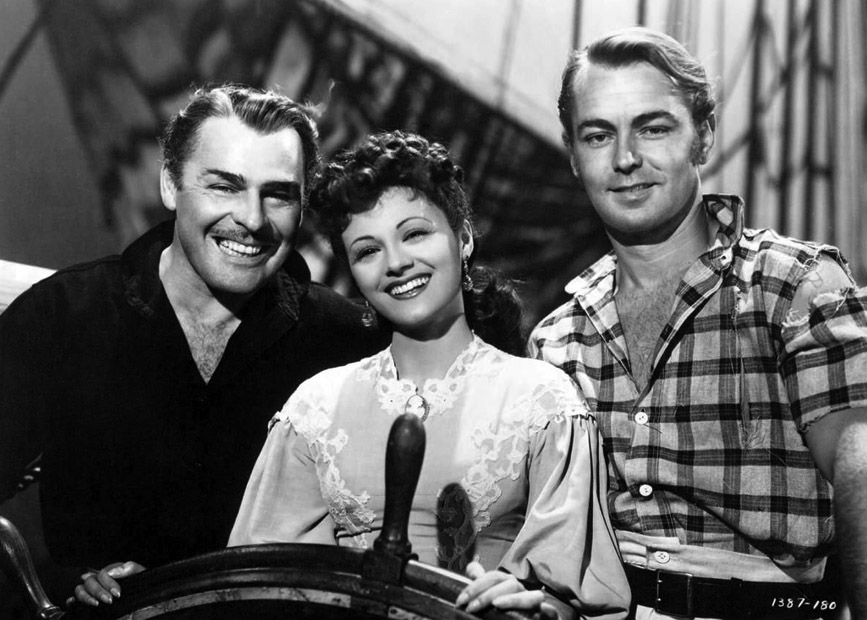
Ladd with Brian Donlevy and Esther Fernández in Two Years Before the Mast (1946)

Paramount had owned the film rights to A Gun for Sale, a novel by Graham Greene, since 1936, but waited until 1941 before making a movie out of it, changing the title to This Gun for Hire. Director Frank Tuttle was struggling to find a new actor to play the role of Raven, a hit man with a conscience. Ladd auditioned successfully, and Paramount signed him to a long-term contract in September 1941 for $300 per week. The New York Times wrote that:

Tuttle and the studio are showing more than a passing enthusiasm for Ladd. He has been trying to get a foothold in pictures for eight years, but received no encouragement, although he tried every angle known to town—extra work, bit parts, stock contracts, dramatic schools, assault of the casting offices. Sue Carol, the former silent star who is now an agent, undertook to advance the youth's career two years ago, and only recently could she locate an attentive ear. Then, the breaks began.

According to author David Thomson in 1975, "Once Ladd had acquired an unsmiling hardness, he was transformed from an extra to a phenomenon. Ladd's calm, slender ferocity make it clear that he was the first American actor to show the killer as a cold angel." John Houseman later wrote that Ladd played "a professional killer with a poignant and desolate ferocity that made him unique, for a time, among the male heroes of his day."

Both the film and Ladd's performance played an important role in the development of the gangster genre: "That the old-fashioned motion picture gangster with his ugly face, gaudy cars, and flashy clothes was replaced by a smoother, better-looking, and better-dressed bad man was largely the work of Mr. Ladd." – The New York Times obituary (January 30, 1964).

Though the romantic lead went to established star Robert Preston, Ladd's teaming in support with female lead Veronica Lake captured the public's imagination. Their overnight-sensation pairing continued in three more films and included three more in guest spots in wartime all-star Hollywood musical revues.

=== The Glass Key ===
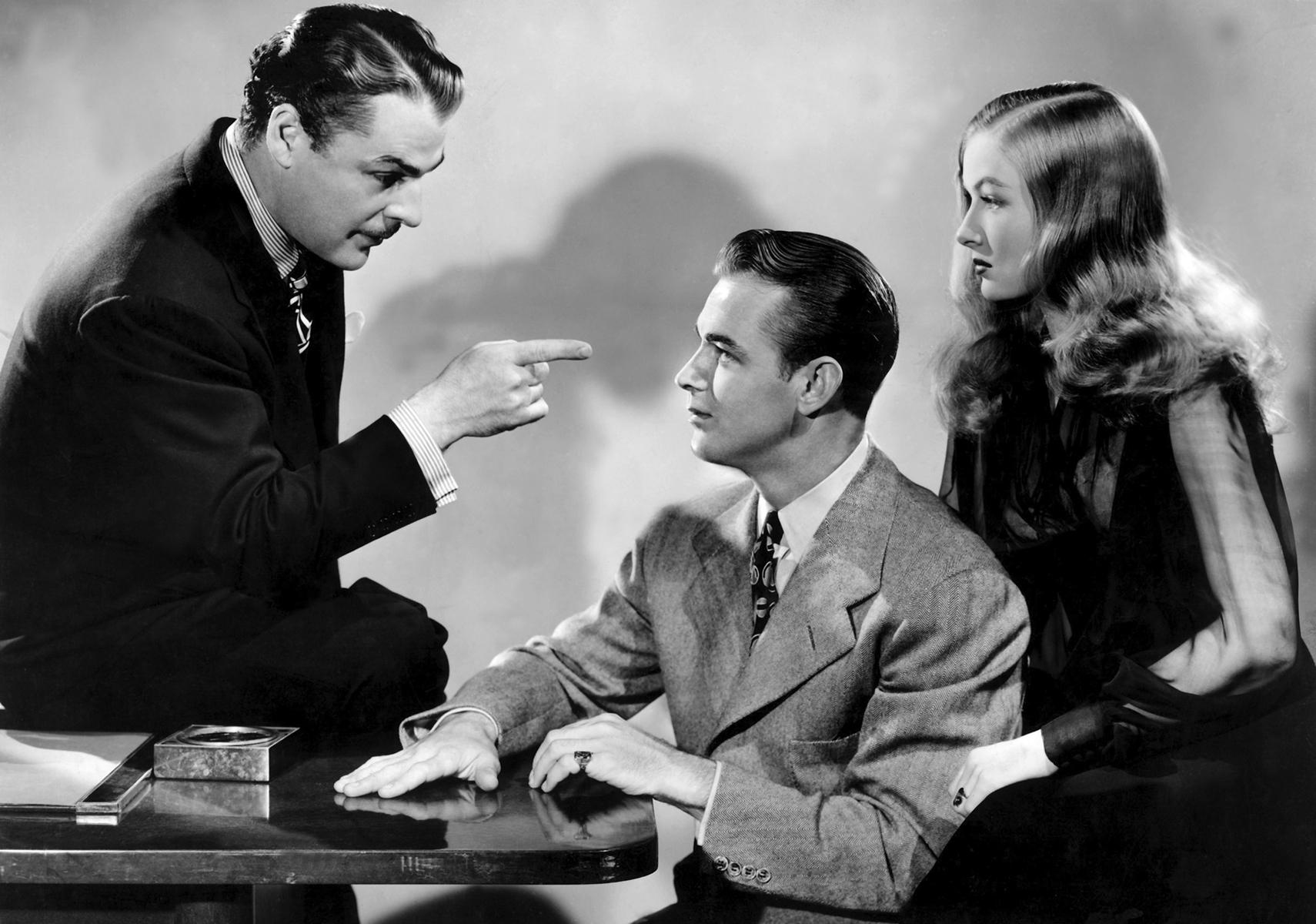
Promotional photo for The Glass Key (1942); Brian Donlevy, Ladd, and Veronica Lake

Even during the filming of This Gun for Hire, Paramount knew it had a potential star and announced Ladd's next film, an adaptation of Dashiell Hammett's story, The Glass Key (1942). This had been a successful vehicle for George Raft several years earlier, and Paramount wanted "a sure-fire narrative to carry him on his way." Talk had also arisen that Ladd would appear in Red Harvest, another story by Hammett, but this was never produced.

The movie was Ladd's second pairing with Lake, with Ladd offering confident support of Brian Donlevy—so confident he even ended up with Donlevy's girl. Ladd's cool, unsmiling, understated persona proved popular with wartime audiences, and he was voted by the Motion Picture Herald as one of the 10 "stars of tomorrow" for 1942. His salary was raised to $750 per week. According to critic David Shipman:

Paramount of course was delighted. The majority of stars were earmarked as such when they appeared on the horizon—from Broadway or from wherever they came; if it seemed unlikely that public acceptance would come with one film, they were trained and built up: The incubation period was usually between two and five years. As far as Ladd was concerned, he was a small-part actor given a fat part faute de mieux, and after his second film for them, he had not merely hit the leading-men category, but had gone beyond it to films which were constructed around his personality.

Ladd then appeared in Lucky Jordan (1943), a lighter vehicle with Helen Walker, playing a gangster who tries to get out of war service and tangles with Nazis. His new status was reflected by the fact he was the only actor billed above the title. He had a cameo spoofing his tough guy image in Star Spangled Rhythm, which featured most of Paramount's stars, and then starred in China (1943) with Loretta Young for director John Farrow, with whom Ladd made a number of movies. Young did not like working with Ladd:

I found him petulant... I don't remember hearing him laugh, or ever seeing him laugh. Everything that concerned him was very serious... He had a certain screen personality... but as an actor... I never made any contact with him. He wouldn't look at me. He'd say "I love you...", and he'd be looking out there some place. Finally, I said "Alan, I'm he-ere!!"... I think he was very conscious of his looks. Alan would not look beyond a certain point in the camera because he didn't think he looked good... Jimmy Cagney was not tall but somehow Jimmy was at terms with himself, always. I don't think Alan Ladd ever came to terms with himself.

Ladd's next film was meant to be Incendiary Blonde, opposite Betty Hutton, but he was inducted into the army on January 18, after reprising his performance in This Gun for Hire on radio for Lux Radio Theatre.

=== Army service ===
Ladd briefly served in the U.S. Army Air Forces' First Motion Picture Unit. Initially, he was classified 4-F—unfit for military service because of stomach problems—but he later enlisted for military service on January 19, 1943. He was posted to the Walla Walla Army Air Base at Walla Walla, Washington, attaining the rank of corporal. He attended the Oscars in March 1943, and in September, he appeared in a trailer promoting a war loan drive titled Letter from a Friend.

While Ladd was in the armed services, a number of films that had been announced for him were postponed and/or made with different actors, including Incendiary Blonde, The Story of Dr. Wassell, Ministry of Fear, and The Man in Half Moon Street. Paramount started promoting Ladd replacements, such as Sonny Tufts and Barry Sullivan. Old Ladd films were reissued with his being given more prominent billing, such as Hitler, Beast of Berlin. He was reportedly receiving 20,000 fan letters per week. The New York Times reported that "Ladd in the brief period of a year and with only four starring pictures to his credit... had built up a following unmatched in film history since Rudolph Valentino skyrocketed to fame." In December 1943, he was listed as the 15th-most popular star in the U.S.

Ladd fell ill and went to the military hospital in Santa Barbara for several weeks in October. On October 28, he was given an honorable medical discharge because of a stomach disorder complicated by influenza.

=== Return to filmmaking ===
When Ladd returned from the army, Paramount announced a series of vehicles for him, including And Now Tomorrow and Two Years Before the Mast. And Now Tomorrow was a melodrama, starring Loretta Young as a wealthy deaf woman who is treated (and loved) by her doctor, played by Ladd; Raymond Chandler co-wrote the screenplay, and it was filmed in late 1943 and early 1944. According to Shipman:

It was a pitch to sell Ladd to women filmgoers, though he had not changed one iota and he did not have a noticeable romantic aura. But Paramount hoped that women might feel that beneath the rock-like expression, there smouldered fires of passion, or something like. His black-lashed eyes, however, gave nothing away; it was 'take me as I am' or 'I'm the boss around here'. He never flirted nor even seemed interested (which is one of the reasons he and Lake were so effective together).

In March 1944, Ladd took another physical and was reclassified 1A. He would have to be reinducted into the army, but a deferment was given to enable Ladd to make Two Years Before the Mast (the release of which was postponed two years). He was meant to be reinducted on September 4, 1944, but Paramount succeeded in getting this pushed back again to make Salty O'Rourke. He also found time to make a cameo in a big-screen version of Duffy's Tavern.

Ladd's reinduction was then set for May 1945. Paramount commissioned Raymond Chandler to write an original screenplay for him titled The Blue Dahlia, made relatively quickly in case the studio lost Ladd to the military once again. In May 1945, though, the U.S. Army released all men 30 or over from induction, and Ladd was finally free from the draft. Along with several other film stars likewise spared, Ladd promptly enlisted with the Hollywood Victory Committee for the entertainment industry's overseas arm, volunteering to tour for USO shows.

Ladd next made Calcutta (1947), which reteamed him with John Farrow and William Bendix. Release for this film was delayed.

=== Suspension ===
Ladd was meant to make California with Betty Hutton, but he refused to report for work in August 1945. "It wasn't on account of the picture", said Ladd. "There were other issues." Ladd wanted more money, and Paramount responded by suspending him. The two parties reconciled in November, with Ladd getting a salary increase to $75,000 per film, but without story approval or the right to do outside films, which he had wanted. Exhibitors voted him the 15th-most popular star in the country.

"When a star's off the screen, he's 'dead'", Ladd later reflected. "I like my home and my security, and I don't intend to jeopardize them by being difficult at work."

Ladd's next film was O.S.S, a wartime thriller, produced by Richard Maibaum. He then convinced Ladd that he should play the title role in an adaptation of The Great Gatsby, to which Paramount held the film rights; Ladd became enthusiastic at the chance to change his image, but the project was delayed by a combination of censorship wrangles and studio reluctance.

Eventually, The Blue Dahlia was released to great acclaim (Raymond Chandler was nominated for an Oscar for the screenplay), quickly followed by O.S.S., and finally, Two Years Before the Mast. The first two films were solid hits, each earning over $2 million in rentals in the U.S. and Canada; Two Years Before the Mast was a blockbuster, earning over $4 million and ranking among the top-10 most popular films of the year. Ladd's roles in This Gun for Hire, The Glass Key, and The Blue Dahlia, firmly established him as a no-nonsense tough guy in a popular genre of crime films later to become known as film noir.

Ladd earned a reported $88,909 for the 12 months up to June 1946. (The following year, he earned $107,000.) In 1947, he was ranked among the top-10 popular stars in the U.S. That year finally had the release of Calcutta, along with Wild Harvest, where he reteamed with Robert Preston.

Ladd made a cameo appearance as a detective in the Bob Hope comedy, My Favorite Brunette (1947), and he made another cameo in an all-star Paramount film, titled, Variety Girl, singing Frank Loesser's "Tallahassee" with Dorothy Lamour. He was reteamed with Lake for the final time in Saigon (1948), then made Whispering Smith (1948), his first Western since he became a star (and his first movie in color). He followed this with Beyond Glory (1948), a melodrama with Farrow, which featured Audie Murphy in his film debut (and was released before Whispering Smith).

=== Radio and comic books ===
Since he had become a star, Ladd continued to appear in radio, usually in dramatizations of feature films for such shows as Lux Radio Theatre and Screen Directors Playhouse. He created roles played both by himself, but also other actors, including the part of Rick Blaine in an adaptation of Casablanca. In 1948, he starred and produced Box 13, a regular weekly series for syndication, which ran for 52 episodes.

From 1949–1951, he appeared in a nine-issue series of comic books published by DC Comics, portraying Ladd in a variety of adventurous situations; the first six issues had photos of him on the covers.

=== The Great Gatsby ===
Ladd's next role was a significant change of pace, playing Jay Gatsby in the 1949 version of The Great Gatsby, written and produced by Richard Maibaum. This film had been planned since 1946, but production was delayed by difficulties with the censor and Paramount's reluctance for Ladd to play such a challenging part. It was not a big success at the box office, and its mixed critical and commercial reception caused Ladd to avoid serious dramatic roles.

His next films were standard fare: Chicago Deadline, playing a tough reporter; Captain Carey, U.S.A., as a vengeful ex-OSS agent, for Maibaum; and Appointment with Danger, as a postal inspector investigating a murder with the help of nun Phyllis Calvert (shot in 1949, but not released until 1951).

Paramount purchased the screen rights to the play Detective Story as a possible vehicle for Ladd, and he was keen to do it, but the role went to Kirk Douglas. Ladd was cast, instead, in Branded, a Western. In February 1950, Paramount announced that Ladd would star in a film version of the novel Shane. Before he made this film, he appeared in Red Mountain, produced by Hal Wallis.

In 1950, the Hollywood Women's Press Club voted Ladd the easiest male star to deal with in Hollywood. The following year, a poll from the Hollywood Foreign Press Association listed Ladd as the second-most popular male film star in the world, after Gregory Peck.

=== Shane ===
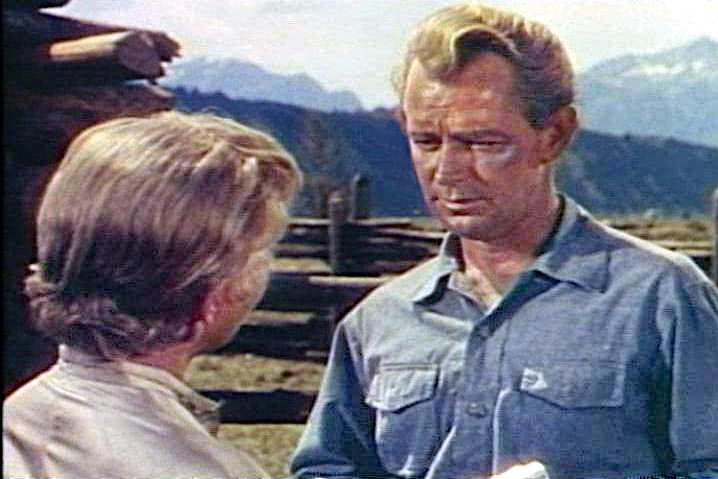
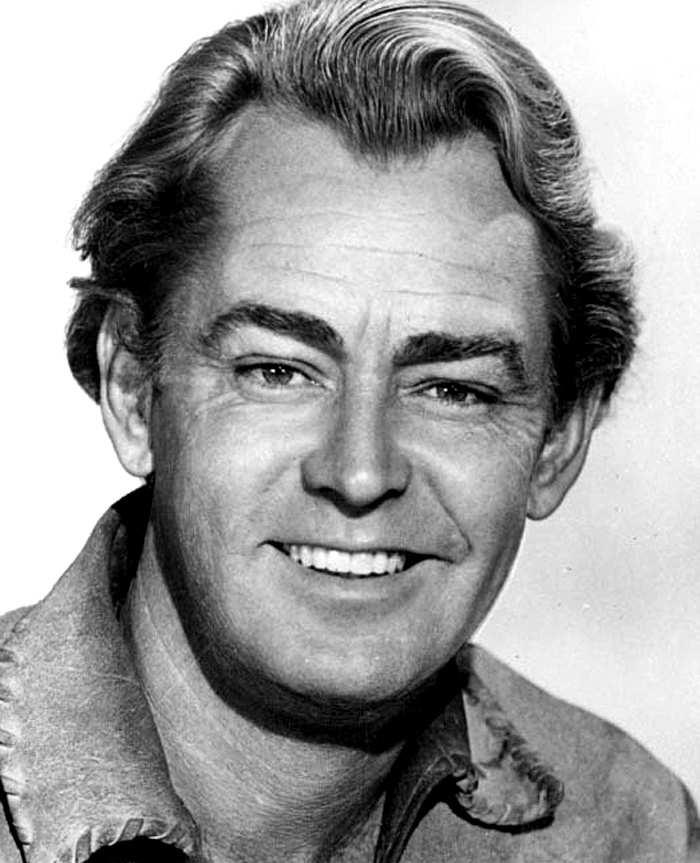
Two pictures from the movie Shane (1953), (left): Ladd with Jean Arthur, and a publicity image

In 1951, Ladd's contract had only one more year to run. "Paramount is like a home to me," he said, "and I'd like to remain on the lot for one picture a year. But I want to be free to take pictures at other studios if offered to me." The main studio with which Ladd was in discussion was Warner Bros. He also received a six-year offer to make Adventure Limited, a TV series.

In May 1951, Ladd announced he had formed Ladd Enterprises, his own production company, to produce films, radio, and TV, when his Paramount contract ended in November 1952. He optioned the novel Shadow Riders of the Yellowstone by Les Savage. The next month, his deal with Warner Bros. was announced - one film per year for five years. However, he expressed a desire to continue to work with Paramount.

Ladd's final three movies for Paramount were Thunder in the East, Shane, and Botany Bay. Once Ladd finished Botany Bay in February 1952, Paramount announced that Ladd's contract would end early and be amended, so that he would make two more movies for the studio, at a later date. (In the end, Ladd did not make another film at Paramount until The Carpetbaggers.)

Paramount staggered the release of Ladd's final films for the company, with Shane and Botany Bay not being released until 1953. Ladd later said that leaving Paramount was "a big upset" for him, and that he only left for "business reasons...future security for the children and ourselves".

Shane, in which he played a strong, silent, courageous title character, was particularly popular. It premiered at Radio City Music Hall in New York City in April 1953, grossing over $114,000 in its four weeks there (a large sum at the time), and earning $8 million in North America over its initial run. This led to Ladd's being voted one of the 10 most popular stars in the U.S. in 1953.

=== Freelance star: Warner Bros., Universal, Warwick ===
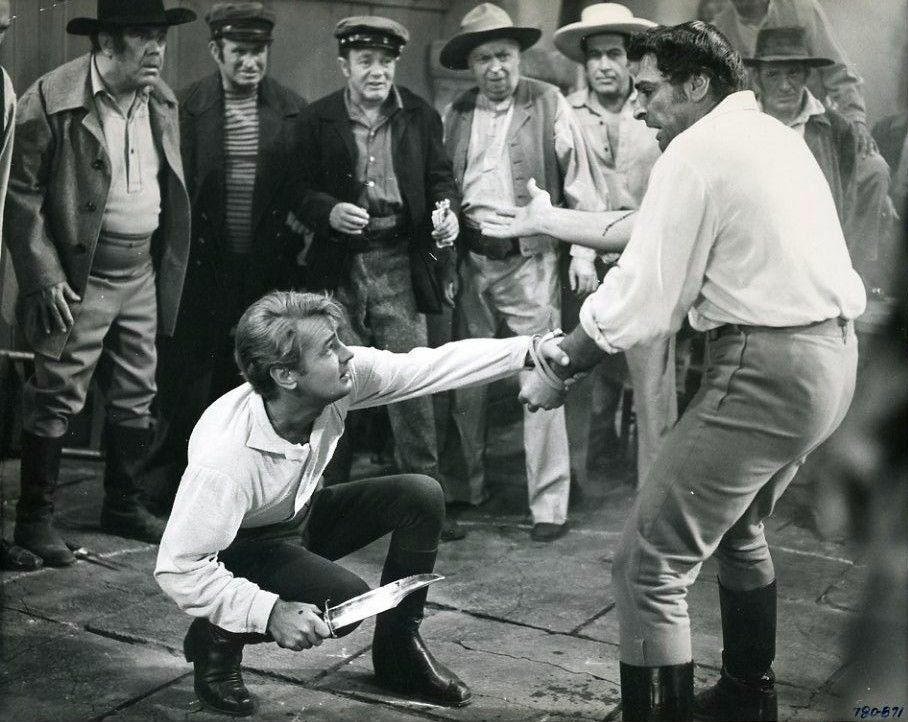
Studio publicity photograph of Tony Caruso and Ladd in The Iron Mistress

Ladd's deal with Warner Bros. was for one film per year for 10 years, starting from when his contract with Paramount expired. Warner guaranteed him $150,000 per film against 10% of the gross, making Ladd one of the better-paid stars in Hollywood. His first film for Warner Bros. was The Iron Mistress (1952), in which Ladd played Jim Bowie.

The arrangement with Warner was not exclusive, enabling Ladd to work for other studios. He made Desert Legion, a film at Universal Studios (1953), playing a member of the French Foreign Legion. Ladd was paid a fee and a percentage of the profits.

Ladd signed an arrangement with Warwick Films to make three films in Britain, where the actor was very popular, starting with a wartime saga titled The Red Beret (1953), with Ladd masquerading as a Canadian soldier in the Parachute Regiment, and a whaling story titled Hell Below Zero (1954), based on the Hammond Innes book The White South. Both movies were co-written by Richard Maibaum, with whom Ladd had worked at Paramount. Ladd played a mountie in Saskatchewan for Universal in Canada and returned to Britain for his final film with Warwick, The Black Knight (1954), a medieval swashbuckler (a genre then in vogue), wherein Ladd played the title role. This meant Ladd spent 19 months out of the U.S. and did not have to pay tax on his income for this period. It also caused his plans to enter independent production to be deferred. Ladd's fee for his Warwick films was $200,000 against 10% of the profits, plus living expenses.

=== Jaguar Productions ===
When Ladd returned to Hollywood in 1954, he formed Jaguar Productions, a new production company that released movies through Warner Bros. This was in addition to the films he made with Warner, solely as an actor.

His first film for Jaguar was Drum Beat (1954), a Western directed by Delmer Daves, which was reasonably successful at the box office. For Warner Bros., he then made The McConnell Story (1955), co-starring June Allyson, which also proved popular. He signed to appear in some episodes of General Electric Theater on TV. The first of these, "Committed", was based on an old episode of Box 13, which Ladd was considering turning into a TV series. However, despite Ladd's presence, a series did not result.

Ladd next made Hell on Frisco Bay (1955), a film for Jaguar also starring second-billed Edward G. Robinson and Joanne Dru, co-written by Martin Rackin and directed by Frank Tuttle, his old This Gun for Hire associate. Rackin wrote and produced Ladd's subsequent film, titled Santiago, which he made for Warner Bros. For Jaguar, Ladd produced, but did not appear in, A Cry in the Night.

Ladd's instinct for choosing material was proving increasingly poor: George Stevens offered him the role of Jett Rink in Giant (1956), which he turned down because it was not the lead; James Dean took the part, and the film became one of the big hits of the decade. He was meant to return to Paramount to make The Sons of Katie Elder, but he bought himself out of his Paramount contract for $135,000; the film was made a decade later, with John Wayne and Dean Martin, and was a big hit.

Instead, Ladd signed a new four-year contract between Jaguar and Warner Bros., with his company having a budget of $6.5 million. The first film made under it was The Big Land (1957), a Western. He made Farewell to Kennedy, another TV film for General Electric Theater; he hoped this would lead to a series, but that did not happen.

Ladd then received an offer to star in Boy on a Dolphin (1957), a film being made in Greece for 20th Century Fox. In March 1957, Warner Bros. and Jaguar announced they had renegotiated their agreement and that Jaguar would now make 10 films for the studio, of which Ladd was to appear in at least six, starting with The Deep Six (1958). Warner Bros. provided all the financing and split profits with Jaguar 50/50. The second film under the contract was Island of Lost Women, which Ladd produced, but in which he did not appear.

Ladd's next film as an actor had him co-star with his son David in The Proud Rebel, made independently for Samuel Goldwyn Jr. According to Shipman, Ladd's "performance is his best work, sincere and likable (due perhaps to an odd resemblance in long shot to Buster Keaton), but the film did not have the success it deserved; Ladd's own fans missed the bang-bang and [co-star] Olivia de Havilland's fans were not persuaded that any film she did with Ladd could be that good." He announced a six-picture deal with Warwick Productions but ultimately did not work for Warwick again. MGM hired Ladd to make The Badlanders, a Western remake of The Asphalt Jungle, but like many of Ladd's films around this time, it was a box-office disappointment.

Ladd was considered to play the lead in The Angry Hills, but Robert Mitchum eventually was cast. Mitchum later told a journalist that the producers met Ladd at his home after "he'd just crawled out of his swimming pool and was all shrunken up like a dishwasher's hand. They decided he wouldn't do for the big war correspondent."

=== Later films ===
For Walter Mirisch at United Artists, Ladd appeared in The Man in the Net. He produced a pilot for a TV series, starring William Bendix, called Ivy League. That did not go to series; neither did The Third Platoon, another pilot Ladd produced for Paramount, written by a young Aaron Spelling, in which Ladd only did a voiceover. Spelling also wrote Guns of the Timberland for Jaguar and Warner Bros., in which Ladd appeared; it was his last movie for Warner Bros.

As an actor, he made All the Young Men with Sidney Poitier that was released through Columbia. One Foot in Hell (1960), over at 20th Century Fox, had Ladd play an out-and-out villain for the first time since the beginning of his career, but the result was not popular with audiences.

"I'd like to retire from acting", he said in 1960. "I'd produce." Ladd kept busy developing projects, some of which were vehicles for his son, David.

Ladd also kept acting, following the path of many Hollywood stars made Duel of Champions (1961), a peplum in Italy. Back in Hollywood, he made 13 West Street, as a star and producer, for Ladd Enterprises.

"I'll go to work again when the right story comes along", said Ladd. He joined the board of 38 Inc., a new film-producing company, which announced plans to make a movie out of a Ben Hecht script.

In 1963, Ladd's career looked set to make a comeback, when he took a supporting role in The Carpetbaggers, based on the best-selling novel. This was a co-production between Embassy and Paramount, meaning Ladd was filming on the Paramount back lot for the first time in over a decade. He also announced plans to turn Box 13 into a feature-film script, and was hoping for cameos from old friends, such as Veronica Lake and William Bendix.

== Personal life ==
On November 29, 1937, Ladd's mother, who was staying with him following the breakup of a relationship, asked Ladd for some money to buy something at a local store. Ladd gave her the money, thinking it was for alcohol. She purchased some arsenic-based ant paste from a grocer and died by suicide by drinking it in the back seat of Ladd's car.

On November 2, 1962, Ladd was found lying unconscious in a pool of blood with a bullet wound near his heart. The bullet penetrated Ladd's chest around the third and fourth rib, through the lungs, and bounced off the rib cage. At the time, Ladd said he thought he heard a prowler, grabbed a gun, and tripped over, accidentally shooting himself. This was accepted by the police who were investigating.

Ladd has a star on the Hollywood Walk of Fame at 1601 Vine Street. His handprint appears in the forecourt of Grauman's Chinese Theatre in Hollywood. In 1995, a Golden Palm Star on the Palm Springs Walk of Stars was dedicated to him.

=== Family and relationships ===
Ladd married Marjorie Jane "Midge" Harrold, a high-school sweetheart, in October 1936. Their only child, Alan Ladd, Jr., was born on October 22, 1937. They divorced in July 1941 and she died in 1957, having remarried.

On March 15, 1942, Ladd married his agent and manager, former film actress Sue Carol, in Mexico City. They intended to be remarried in the U.S. in July because Ladd's divorce from his first wife was not final. Carol had a daughter from a previous marriage, Carol Lee (b. July 18, 1932), whom Alan and Sue raised. In addition, they had two children of their own, Alana (born April 21, 1943, when Ladd was in the army) and David Ladd (1947).

Alan Ladd, Jr., was a film executive and producer and founder of the Ladd Company. Actress Alana Ladd, who co-starred with her father in Guns of the Timberland and Duel of Champions, was married to veteran talk radio broadcaster Michael Jackson. Alana died on November 23, 2014. Actor David Ladd, who co-starred with his father as a child in The Proud Rebel, was married (1973–1980) to Charlie's Angels star Cheryl Ladd (née Stoppelmoor). Their daughter is actress Jordan Ladd.

Ladd's name was linked romantically with June Allyson when they made The McConnell Story together.

=== Height ===
Reports of Ladd's height vary from 5 ft 5 in (165 cm) to 5 ft 9 1/2 in (177 cm), with 5 ft 6 in (168 cm) being cited most often in unofficial sources. His 1940 draft registration lists him as 5 ft 9 1/2 in (177 cm). His 1943 U.S. Army enlistment record, generally deemed to be the most reliable source, lists him as 5 ft 7 in (170 cm).

Ladd and Veronica Lake became a particularly popular pairing because, at 4 ft 11 in (150 cm), she was one of the few Hollywood actresses substantially shorter than he was. In his memoirs, actor/producer John Houseman wrote of Ladd: "Since he himself was extremely short, he had only one standard by which he judged his fellow players: their height." To compensate for Ladd's height, during the filming of Boy on a Dolphin, co-starring the 5 ft 8 in (173 cm) Sophia Loren, the cinematographer used special low stands to light Ladd and the crew built a ramp system of heavy planks to enable the two actors to stand at equal eye level. In outdoor scenes, trenches were dug for Loren to stand in. For the film Saskatchewan, director Raoul Walsh had a hole dug for 6 ft 0 in (183 cm) co-star Hugh O'Brian to stand in, while using the excavated dirt to build a mound for Ladd to stand on, thereby overcoming the disparity in height.

== Death ==
In January 1964, after injuring his knees, Ladd hoped to recuperate at his house in Palm Springs. On January 29, 1964, his butler said that he saw Ladd on his bed at 10 am; when he returned at 3:30 pm, he found Ladd dead on his bed.

His death, due to cerebral edema caused by an acute overdose of alcohol, a barbiturate, and two tranquilizers containing at least two depressants, was ruled accidental. Ladd suffered from chronic insomnia and regularly used sleeping pills and alcohol to induce sleep. While he had not taken a lethal amount of any one drug, the combination apparently caused fatal interaction.

Ladd's funeral was held on February 1, with Edmond O'Brien giving the eulogy. Fans were allowed to see his coffin. He was buried with his wedding ring and a letter that his son David had written to him.

Ladd died a wealthy man, with his holdings including a 5,000-acre (2,000 ha) ranch at Hidden Valley and a hardware store in an architecturally distinguished building, the Alan Ladd Building, also known as The Five Hundred, in Palm Springs. After he died, The Carpetbaggers was released and became a financial success.

== Select radio credits ==
- Lux Radio Theatre – Ep 206 "The Return of Peter Grimm" (February 13, 1939)
- Lux Radio Theatre – Ep 221 "Only Angels Have Wings" (May 29, 1939)
- Lux Radio Theatre – Ep 280 "White Banners" (June 12, 1939)
- Lincoln Highway (May 1942)
- Guest on Kate Smith's radio show – 1942
- Lux Radio Theatre – Ep 380 "This Gun for Hire" (January 25, 1943) – with Joan Blondell and Laird Cregar
- Wings to Victory (March 25, 1943)
- "Musically Inclined" for Silver Theater (December 12, 1943) – with Judy Garland
- Lux Radio Theatre – Ep 415 China (November 22, 1943)
- Suspense – "One Way Ride to Nowhere" (January 6, 1944)
- Suspense – "The Defence Rests" (March 9, 1944)
- Cavalcade of America – "Ambulance Driver Middle East" (April 3, 1944)
- Lux Radio Theatre – Ep 435 Coney Island (April 17, 1944)
- Burns and Allen – special guest star (January 15, 1945)
- Lux Radio Theatre – Ep 473 "Disputed Passage" (March 5, 1945)
- Jack Benny Program – "Murder Mystery" (March 25, 1945)
- Lux Radio Theatre – Ep 484 "And Now Tomorrow" (May 21, 1945)
- The Dinah Shore Show – Guest star (May 31, 1945)
- Command Performance – guest star with Bob Hope, Ann Rutherford (June 14, 1945)
- Lux Radio Theatre – Ep 503 "Salty O'Rourke" (November 26, 1945)
- Duffy's Tavern – guest star (January 4, 1946)
- Lux Radio Theatre – Ep 523 "Whistle Stop" (April 15, 1946)
- Hollywood Star Time – "Double Indemnity" (June 22, 1946)
- Lux Radio Theatre – Ep 546 "OSS" (November 18, 1946)
- Lux Radio Theatre – Ep 582 "Two Years Before the Mast" (September 22, 1947)
- The Screen Guild Theater – "The Blue Dahlia" (April 21, 1949)
- Screen Directors Playhouse – "Saigon" (July 29, 1949)
- Screen Directors Playhouse – "Whispering Smith" (September 16, 1949)
- Suspense – "Motive for Murder" (March 16, 1950)
- Screen Directors Playhouse – "Chicago Deadline" (March 24, 1950)
- Suspense – "A Killing in Abilene" (December 14, 1950)
- Screen Directors Playhouse – "Lucky Jordan" (February 8, 1951)
- Lux Radio Theatre – Ep 911 "Shane" (February 22, 1955)

=== Regular series ===
- Box 13 : 52 episodes (August 22, 1948 – August 14, 1949)

== Filmography ==
Film
Year	Title	Role	Notes
1932	Tom Brown of Culver	Cadet	
1932	Once in a Lifetime	Projectionist	
1933	Saturday's Millions	Student	
1936	Pigskin Parade	Student	
1937	The Last Train from Madrid	Soldier	
1937	Souls at Sea	Sailor	
1937	All Over Town	Young Man	
1937	Hold 'Em Navy	Chief Quartermaster	
1937	Born to the West	Inspector	
1938	The Goldwyn Follies	First Auditioning Singer	
1938	Come On, Leathernecks!	Club Waiter	
1938	Freshman Year	Student	
1939	The Mysterious Miss X	Henchman	
1939	Rulers of the Sea	Colin Farrell	
1939	Hitler – Beast of Berlin	Karl Bach	Also known as Goose Step
1940	American Portrait	Young man/Old man	Short subject
1940	Blame it on Love		Short subject Uncredited
1940	Meat and Romance	Bill Allen	Short subject
1940	Unfinished Rainbows	Charles Martin Hall	Short subject
1940	The Green Hornet	Gilpin, Student Pilot	Chapter 3
1940	Brother Rat and a Baby	Cadet in trouble	
1940	In Old Missouri	John Pittman, Jr.	
1940	The Light of Western Stars	Danny, Stillwell Ranch Hand	
1940	Gangs of Chicago		
1940	Cross-Country Romance	Mr. Williams, First Mate	
1940	Those Were the Days!	Keg Rearick	
1940	Captain Caution	Newton, Mutinous Sailor	
1940	The Howards of Virginia	Backwoodsman	
1940	Meet the Missus	John Williams	
1940	Victory	Heyst as an 18-year-old	
1940	Her First Romance	John Gilman	
1941	I Look at You		Short subject
1941	Petticoat Politics	Higgins Daughter's Boyfriend	
1941	Citizen Kane	Reporter smoking pipe at end	Uncredited
1941	The Black Cat	Richard Hartley	
1941	Paper Bullets	Jimmy Kelly aka Bill Dugan	
1941	The Reluctant Dragon	Al, Baby Weems storyboard artist	
1941	They Met in Bombay	British Soldier	
1941	Great Guns	Soldier in Photo Shop	
1941	Cadet Girl	Harry, musician	
1941	Military Training	Lieutenant, Platoon Leader, County Fair	Short subject Uncredited
1942	Joan of Paris	"Baby"	
1942	This Gun for Hire	Philip Raven	
1942	The Glass Key	Ed Beaumont	
1942	Lucky Jordan	Lucky Jordan	
1942	Star Spangled Rhythm	Alan Ladd, Scarface Skit	
1942	Letter from a Friend		Short subject
1943	China	David Jones	
1943	Screen Snapshots: Hollywood in Uniform	Himself	Short subject
1944	Skirmish on the Home Front	Harry W. Average	Short subject
1944	And Now Tomorrow	Doctor Merek Vance	
1945	Salty O'Rourke	Salty O'Rourke	
1945	Duffy's Tavern	Himself	
1945	Hollywood Victory Caravan	Alan Ladd	Short subject
1946	Two Years Before the Mast	Charles Stewart	
1946	The Blue Dahlia	Johnny Morrison, Lt.Cmdr., ret.	
1946	OSS	Philip Masson/John Martin	
1946	Screen Snapshots: The Skolsky Party	Himself	Short subject
1947	My Favorite Brunette	Sam McCloud	Cameo appearance
1947	Calcutta	Neale Gordon	Filmed in mid-1945
1947	Variety Girl	Himself	
1947	Wild Harvest	Joe Madigan	
1948	Saigon	Maj. Larry Briggs	
1948	Beyond Glory	Capt. Rockwell "Rocky" Gilman	
1948	Whispering Smith	Whispering Smith	
1949	Eyes of Hollywood		Short subject
1949	The Great Gatsby	Jay Gatsby	
1949	Chicago Deadline	Ed Adams	
1950	Captain Carey, U.S.A.	Captain Webster Carey	
1950	Branded	Choya	
1951	Appointment with Danger	Al Goddard	
1951	Red Mountain	Capt. Brett Sherwood	
1952	The Iron Mistress	Jim Bowie	
1952	Thunder in the East	Steve Gibbs	Filmed in 1951
1952	A Sporting Oasis	Himself	Short subject
1953	Botany Bay	Hugh Tallant	
1953	Desert Legion	Paul Lartal	
1953	Shane	Shane	Filmed in 1951
1953	The Red Beret	Steve "Canada" McKendrick	Filmed in England
1954	Hell Below Zero	Duncan Craig	Filmed in England
1954	Saskatchewan	Thomas O'Rourke	Filmed in Alberta
1954	The Black Knight	John	Filmed in England
1954	Drum Beat	Johnny MacKay	Producer
1955	The McConnell Story	Capt. Joseph C. "Mac" McConnell, Jr.	
1956	Hell on Frisco Bay	Steve Rollins	Producer
1956	Santiago	Caleb "Cash" Adams	Producer
1956	A Cry in the Night	Opening narrator	Producer
1957	The Big Land	Chad Morgan	Producer
1957	Boy on a Dolphin	Dr. James Calder	Filmed in Greece
1958	The Deep Six	Alexander "Alec" Austen	Producer
1958	The Proud Rebel	John Chandler	
1958	The Badlanders	Peter Van Hoek ("The Dutchman")	
1959	The Man in the Net	John Hamilton	Producer
1959	Island of Lost Women	–	Executive producer
1960	Guns of the Timberland	Jim Hadley	Executive producer
1960	All the Young Men	Sgt. Kincaid	Executive producer
1960	One Foot in Hell	Mitch Garrett	
1961	Duel of Champions	Horatius Cocles	Filmed in Italy
1962	13 West Street	Walt Sherill	Producer
1964	The Carpetbaggers	Nevada Smith	Released posthumously

Television
Year	Title	Role	Notes
1953	Better Living TV Theatre	Himself	September 6, 1953, episode
1954	Red Skelton Revue	Guest (Old West Sketch)	Episode 1.1
1954–1958	General Electric Theater	Various roles	3 episodes Executive producer (2 episodes)
1955	Kings Row	Himself	Episode: "Lady in Fear"
1957–1958	The Bob Cummings Show	Himself	2 episodes
1959	Schlitz Playhouse of Stars	–	Episode: "Ivy League"

== Awards ==
- Photoplay 1953 Gold Medal for his performance in Shane

== Box-office ranking ==
For a number of years, film exhibitors voted him among the top stars at the box office.

Year	US	UK
1943	15th	
1945	15th	
1946	14th	8th or 4th
1947	10th	7th
1948	14th	
1949	17th	7th
1950	(did not make top 25)	8th
1951	17th	8th
1952	16th	
1953	4th	3rd
1954	6th	1st
1955	17th	5th
1956	25th	6th

- In 1948, a survey was taken of the film-going habits of 4,500 teenagers in Lakewood, Ohio. Their "overwhelming first choice" as film star was Alan Ladd.

== Theatre ==
- The Mikado (May 1933) – as Koko – at North Hollywood High School
- Marinella (July 19, 1933) – an aquatic pageant in North Hollywood
- Grey Zone by Martin Mooney (Oct 1936) at Ben Bard Playhouse
- Susanne by Eloisse Keller (Jan 1937) at Ben Bard Playhouse
- Between Two Women by Carey Wilson (April 1937) at Ben Bard Playhouse – with Jack Carson
- Maniacs in Monocles by Robert Riley Crutcher (July 1937) at Ben Bard Playhouse
