= Salty O'Rourke =

1945 film by Raoul Walsh

- Directed by: Raoul Walsh
- Written by: Milton Holmes
- Based on: original story by Milton Holmes
- Produced by: E.D. Leshin
- Starring: Alan Ladd; Gail Russell
- Cinematography: Theodor Sparkuhl
- Edited by: William Shea
- Music by: Robert Emmett Dolan
- Production company: Paramount Pictures
- Distributed by: Paramount Pictures
- Release date: March 22, 1945
- Running time: 100 minutes
- Country: United States
- Language: English
- Box office: 448,514 admissions (France)

Salty O'Rourke is a 1945 American sports drama film directed by Raoul Walsh and starring Alan Ladd, Gail Russell and William Demarest. Produced and distributed by Paramount Pictures, it was nominated for an Academy Award in 1946 for Best Writing (Original Screenplay) for Milton Holmes, with the award going to Richard Schweizer for Marie-Louise.

== Plot ==
In New Orleans, racetrack gambler Salty O'Rourke is pursued by gangster Doc Baxter, after Salty's partner runs off with Baxter's $20,000 and is murdered. O'Rourke and his pal Smitty have one month to pay up.

Salty buys a racehorse, Whipper, who can only be ridden by Johnny Cates, a jockey banned for throwing a race. Johnny pretends to be his 17-year-old brother Timothy but is forced to attend school. Johnny insults his teacher, Barbara Brooks, on his first day and is expelled. Salty gets Johnny back in school by befriending Barbara and her mother. Both Johnny and Salty fall in love with Barbara but she prefers Salty. This causes Johnny to swear vengeance against Salty. He decides to throw the race but changes his mind and is shot by Baxter's henchman.

== Cast ==
- Alan Ladd as Salty O'Rourke
- Gail Russell as Barbara Brooks
- William Demarest as Smitty
- Bruce Cabot as Doc Baxter
- Spring Byington as Mrs. Brooks
- Stanley Clements as Johnny Cates
- Rex Williams as Babe
- Darryl Hickman as Sneezer
- Marjorie Woodworth as Lola
- Don Zelaya as Hotel proprietor
- Lester Matthews as Salesman
- William Forrest as Racing secretary
- William Murphy as Bennie
- Denis Brown as Murdock

== Production ==
Milton Holmes wrote the original story. It envisioned as a vehicle for Clark Gable, Rosalind Russell and Mickey Rooney. When Gable went off to the services the film rights were purchased by Paramount in 1942 for $28,000 who developed it as a vehicle for George Raft.

The film eventually became a vehicle for Alan Ladd. Production plans were delayed when Ladd went into the army but were reactivated when he was honorably discharged in October 1943. Ladd's costar in Lucky Jordan, Helen Walker, was originally announced as co star. Adrian Scott was brought on to work on the script and René Clair to direct. Irving Cummings was then meant to direct.

Eventually Gail Russell became Ladd's co star and Raoul Walsh the director. Stanley Clements was cast in the third lead after impressing in Going My Way.

Filming plans were interrupted when Alan Ladd was reclassified 1A and would have to be re-inducted into the army. Paramount got a deferment to enable him to make Two Years Before the Mast and tried to get one to make Salty O'Rourke as well. They succeeded and filming started in late August 1944.

== See also ==
- List of films about horse racing
