= Gwen Bagni =

American screenwriter (1913–2001)

- Born: January 24, 1913
- Died: May 13, 2001 (aged 88); Glendale, California, U.S.
- Occupations: Screenwriter, TV writer
- Spouse(s): John Bagni (d. 1954) Paul Dubov (m. 1963)

Gwen Bagni (January 24, 1913 – May 13, 2001) was an American screenwriter and TV writer. She worked on Backstairs at the White House and Four Star Playhouse. She worked with her first husband actor/writer John Bagni, who died in 1954. Their collaborations included scripts for Douglas Fairbanks Presents. After being married to screenwriter Irwin Gielgud (1955-61), she also wrote screenplays with her third husband, the actor Paul Dubov, whom she married in 1963, until his death in 1979.

== Filmography ==
=== Films ===
Year	Film	Credit	Notes
1950	Captain China	Screenplay By, Story By	Co-Wrote Screenplay with "Lewis R. Foster"
1951	The Bogus Green	Written By	TV Short, Co-Wrote Screenplay with "John Bagni"
1952	Untamed Frontier	Screenplay By	Co-Wrote Screenplay with "John Bagni" and "Gerald Drayson Adams"
1953	Law and Order	Screenplay By	Co-Wrote Screenplay with "John Bagni" and "D.D. Beauchamp"
1956	The Last Wagon	Story by & Written By	Co-Wrote Screenplay with "Delmer Daves" and "James Edward Grant"
1968	With Six You Get Eggroll	Written By	Co-Wrote Screenplay with "R. S. Allen"
1976	20 Shades Of Pink	Written By	
1983	Thursday's Child	Written By	
1987	Eight Is Enough: A Family Reunion	Written By	

=== Television ===
Year	TV Series	Credit	Notes
1950	The Silver Theatre	Writer	1 Episode
1951	The Bigelow Theatre	Writer	1 Episode
1952-54	Four Star Playhouse	Writer	18 Episodes
1953	Rheingold Theater	Writer	1 Episode
1953-54	Fireside Theatre	Writer	4 Episodes
1955	Cavalcade of America	Writer	1 Episode
1955	Ford Theatre	Writer	1 Episode
1955	TV Reader's Digest	Writer	1 Episode
1955	The Halls of Ivy	Writer	1 Episode
1956	Lassie	Writer	1 Episode
1956	Alfred Hitchcock Presents	Writer	2 Episodes
1956	Playhouse 90	Writer	
1956-58	Climax!	Writer	4 Episodes
1958	Pursuit	Writer	1 Episode
1959	The DuPont Show with June Allyson	Writer	2 Episodes
1960	Rawhide	Writer	1 Episode
1960	Riverboat	Writer	2 Episodes
1961	Checkmate	Writer	1 Episode
1962	Leave It to Beaver	Writer	1 Episode
1963	Have Gun – Will Travel	Writer	1 Episode
1963-64	Gunsmoke	Writer	2 Episodes
1963-65	Burke's Law	Writer	13 Episodes
1965-66	Honey West	Writer	10 Episodes
1966	The Green Hornet	Writer	1 Episode
1967	Felony Squad	Writer	1 Episode
1967	Off to See the Wizard	Writer	1 Episode
1968-70	The Mod Squad	Writer	6 Episodes
1969	Love, American Style	Writer	1 Episode
1969	The New People	Writer	1 Episode
1970	The Brady Bunch	Writer	1 Episode
1970	My Three Sons	Writer	1 Episode
1975	Movin' On	Writer	2 Episodes
1977	Wonder Woman	Writer	1 Episode
1977-78	Eight Is Enough	Writer	3 Episodes
1979	Backstairs at the White House	Writer	4 Episodes
1979	Shirley	Writer, Producer	3 Episodes
