= John Bagni =

American actor (1910–1954)

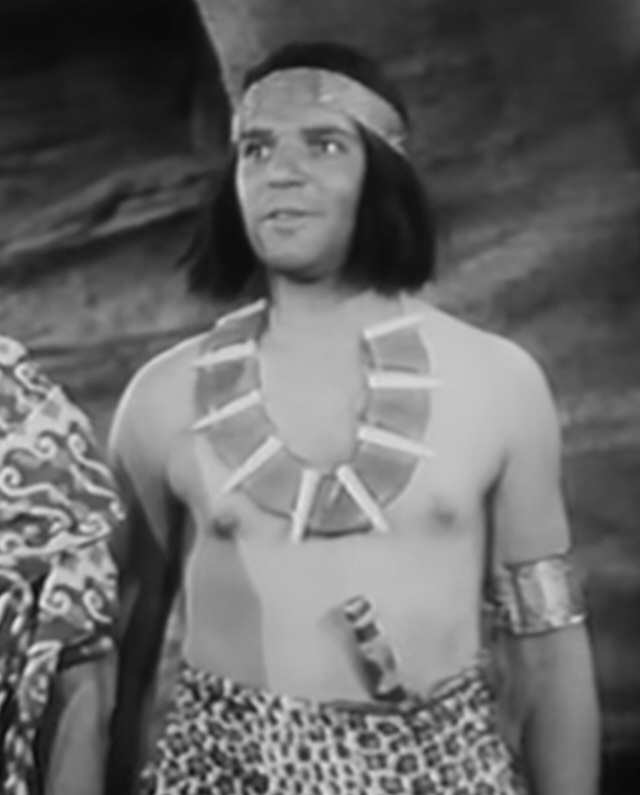
- Bagni in The Phantom (1943)
- Born: December 24, 1910
- Died: February 13, 1954 (aged 43)
- Occupations: Actor, Writer
- Spouse: Gwen Bagni

John Bagni (December 24, 1910 – February 13, 1954) was an American actor and a writer for radio and television.

He often worked with his wife Gwen Bagni. Their collaborations included scripts for Douglas Fairbanks Presents.

== Filmography ==
Year	Title	Role	Notes
1936	Flash Gordon	Hawkman Throne Room Guard	Serial, Uncredited
1937	Blake of Scotland Yard	Cafe Waiter	Serial, [Chs. 1–3, 10, 14], Uncredited
1937	Windjammer	Reporter	Uncredited
1939	Honeymoon in Bali	Cab Driver on Bali	Uncredited
1939	Calling All Marines	Zikas	Uncredited
1940	I Take This Woman	Marx - an Intern	(scenes deleted)
1940	Drums of Fu Manchu	Dangra - Spy at Fort	Serial, [Ch.8], Uncredited
1940	King of the Royal Mounted	Higgins, Cabin Henchman	Serial, [Ch. 7], Uncredited
1940	Mysterious Doctor Satan	Gray - Pick-up Thug	Serial, [Chs. 14-15], Uncredited
1941	Adventures of Captain Marvel	Cowan - Henchman	Serial, [Ch. 2-10]
1941	Mutiny in the Arctic	Loma	
1941	Aloma of the South Seas	Native	Uncredited
1941	King of the Texas Rangers	Slater - Henchman	Serial, (Ch. 10), Uncredited
1941	New York Town	The Dip	Uncredited
1941	Bombay Clipper	Paul, the Purser	
1941	Dick Tracy vs. Crime, Inc.	Pete	Serial, Uncredited
1942	Junior G-Men of the Air	Henchman Augar	Serial
1942	The Tuttles of Tahiti	Ben	Uncredited
1942	Perils of Nyoka	Ben Ali	Serial, [Ch. 1]
1942	Mug Town	Detective #2	Uncredited
1943	Adventures of the Flying Cadets	Heinrichs - Nazi Mine Guard	Serial, [Chs. 7-10], Uncredited
1943	The North Star	Guard at Desk	Uncredited
1943	The Phantom	Moku	Serial, Uncredited
1944	Captain America	Monk	Serial
1944	Passage to Marseille	Seaman	Uncredited
1944	Cobra Woman	Native	Uncredited
1944	Meet the People	Tough Workman	Uncredited
1944	The Desert Hawk	Brother of the Sword	Serial, Uncredited
1944	My Buddy	First Mobster	Uncredited
1945	Counter-Attack	Paratrooper	Uncredited
1945	A Bell for Adano	Priest	Uncredited
1946	The Phantom Thief	Shill	Uncredited
1946	Heldorado	Johnny - Driscoll Henchman	
1947	The Pretender	Hank Gordon	
1947	The Foxes of Harrow	Crew Member	Uncredited
1947	The Senator Was Indiscreet	Italian Waiter	Uncredited
1948	Devil's Cargo	Ofiicer Bob	
1948	Casbah	Inspector	Uncredited
1948	Speed to Spare	Truck Driver	Uncredited
1948	The Far Frontier	Smuggled Criminal	
1950	Captain China	Sparks	
1950	Black Hand	Footpad	Uncredited, (final film role)

== Selected screenwriting ==
- Four Star Playhouse (1952-1954)
