= Captain China =

1950 film by Lewis R. Foster

- Theatrical release poster
- Directed by: Lewis R. Foster
- Screenplay by: Lewis R. Foster; Gwen Bagni
- Story by: John Bagni; Gwen Bagni
- Produced by: William H. Pine; William C. Thomas
- Starring: John Payne; Gail Russell; Jeffrey Lynn; Lon Chaney Jr. Edgar Bergen; Michael O'Shea; Ellen Corby
- Cinematography: John Alton
- Edited by: Howard A. Smith
- Music by: Lucien Cailliet; Josef Marais
- Production company: Pine-Thomas Productions
- Distributed by: Paramount Pictures
- Release date: February 2, 1950
- Running time: 97 minutes
- Country: United States
- Language: English

Captain China is a 1950 American adventure film directed by Lewis R. Foster and written by Foster and Gwen Bagni. The film stars John Payne, Gail Russell, Jeffrey Lynn, Lon Chaney Jr., Edgar Bergen and Michael O'Shea. It was released on February 2, 1950, by Paramount Pictures.

== Cast ==
- John Payne as Charles S. Chinnough / Capt. China
- Gail Russell as Kim Mitchell
- Jeffrey Lynn as Capt. George Brendensen
- Lon Chaney Jr. as Red Lynch
- Edgar Bergen as Mr. Haasvelt
- Michael O'Shea as Trask
- Ellen Corby as Miss Endicott
- Robert Armstrong as Keegan
- John Qualen as Geech
- Ilka Grüning as Mrs. Haasvelt
- Keith Richards as Alberts
- John Bagni as Sparks
- Ray Hyke as Michaels
- Paul Hogan as Speer
- Lawrence Tibbett Jr. as Wilkes
- Zon Murray as Gus
- Don Gazzaniga as Tony
- Denver Pyle as Steve
- Wallace Scott as Scotty
- Lee Roberts as Marsh
- Reed Howes as Blake
- Charles Regan as Wade

== Production ==
The film's star John Payne had recently completed El Paso, another Pine-Thomas Productions film, when he was cast in the lead role for Captain China in January 1949.
