= The Five Hundred =

Building in Palm Springs, California, U.S.

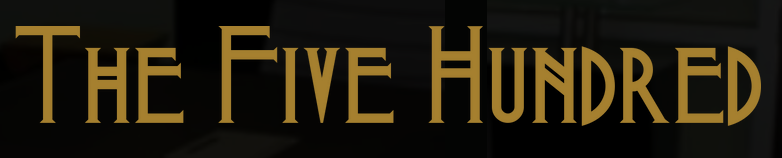

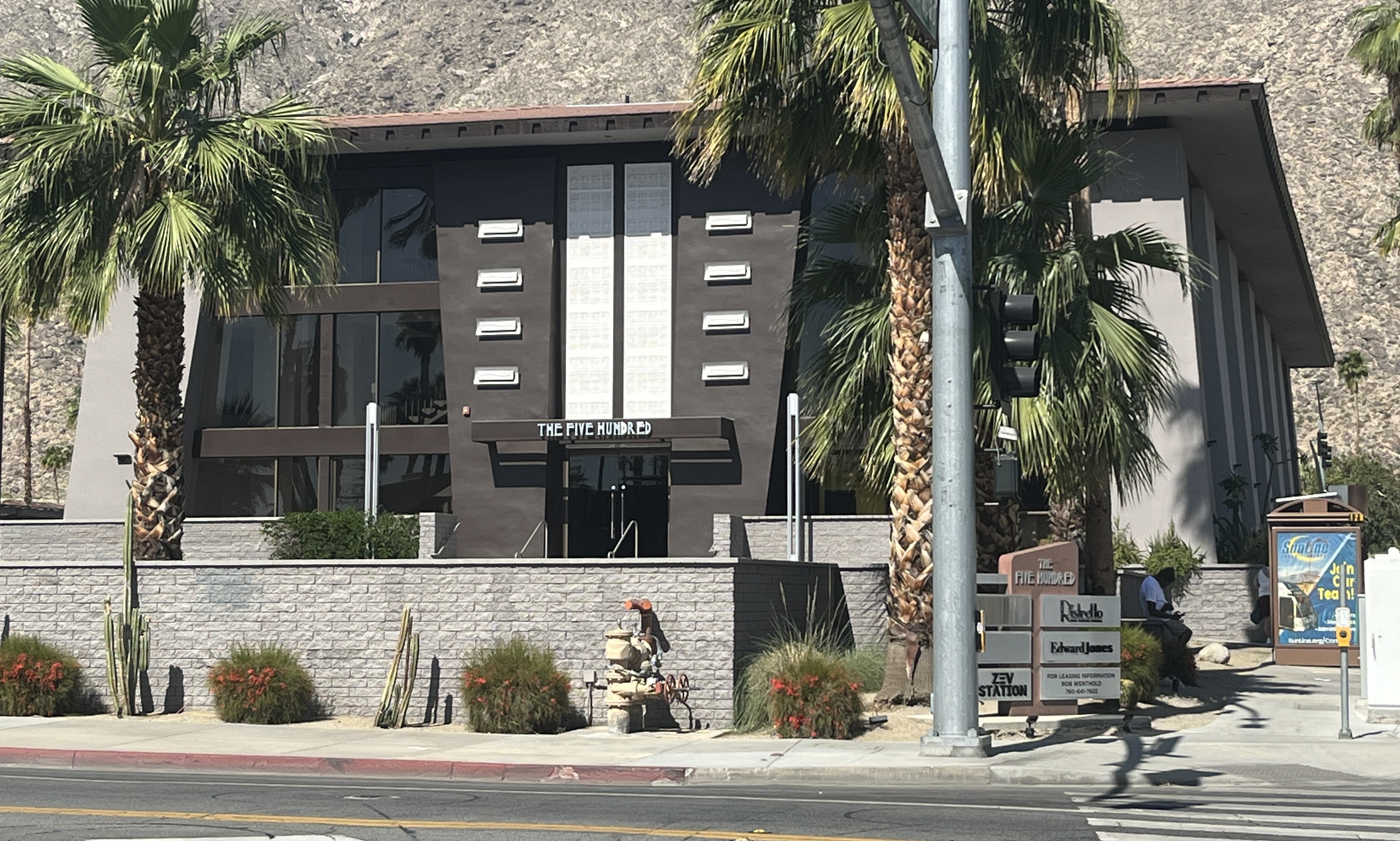
- The building's exterior, 2024
- Interactive map of the The Five Hundred area
- Former names: Alan Ladd Building

General information
- Location: 500 S Palm Canyon Drive, Palm Springs, California, United States
- Coordinates: 33.8155°N 116.5462°W
- Completed: 1968

Design and construction
- Architects: Hugh Kaptur; Lawrence Lapham

The Five Hundred, formerly the Alan Ladd Building, is a building on South Palm Canyon Drive in Palm Springs, California. Hugh Kaptur and Lawrence Lapham were the designers.

== History ==
Completed in 1968, the former hardware store and retail center has been converted into an office building. The building housed Alan Ladd Hardware. John Monahan is the owner and developer. Ristretto is a tenant.

== Reception ==
Locale Magazine and Palm Springs Life have called the building "historic" and "iconic", respectively.
