= Fixed Bayonets! =

1951 film by Samuel Fuller

- Original film poster
- Directed by: Samuel Fuller
- Screenplay by: Samuel Fuller
- Story by: Lamar Trotti (credited)
- Based on: Immortal Sergeant by John Brophy (credited as “suggested by”)
- Produced by: Jules Buck
- Starring: Richard Basehart; Gene Evans; Michael O'Shea; Richard Hylton; Craig Hill; Skip Homeier
- Cinematography: Lucien Ballard
- Edited by: Nick DeMaggio
- Music by: Roy Webb
- Color process: Black and white
- Production company: Twentieth Century-Fox
- Distributed by: Twentieth Century-Fox
- Release date: November 20, 1951 (New York)
- Running time: 92 minutes
- Country: United States
- Language: English
- Box office: $1.45 million (US rentals)

Fixed Bayonets! is a 1951 American war film produced by Twentieth Century-Fox and written and directed by Samuel Fuller. Set during the winter phase of the Korean War (early 1951), the film follows a U.S. Army platoon assigned a rear-guard mission during a withdrawal.

The film includes an early, uncredited screen appearance by American actor James Dean.

== Plot ==
During the first winter of the Korean War, a 48-man U.S. Army platoon is ordered to hold a mountain chokepoint to cover the withdrawal of the larger unit across an exposed bridge. The men contend with subzero temperatures and frostbite as well as enemy fire.

As part of the rear-guard action, the platoon lays a minefield but struggles to keep track of the mine placements. When Sgt. Lonergan is wounded and trapped in the mined area, a rescue attempt results in another soldier’s death. Corporal Denno manages to bring Lonergan out, but the sergeant soon dies of his wounds.

Sgt. Rock, the platoon’s steadying presence, is later killed by a ricochet. With the chain of command collapsing, Denno—reluctant and inwardly focused—must assume leadership as the surviving soldiers attempt to complete their mission and reach the bridge.

== Cast ==
- Richard Basehart as Cpl. Denno
- Gene Evans as Sgt. Rock
- Michael O'Shea as Sgt. Lonergan
- Richard Hylton as Medic John Wheeler
- Craig Hill as Lt. Gibbs
- Skip Homeier as Whitey
- Henry Kulky as Vogl
- Paul Richards as Ramirez
- David Wolfson as Bigmouth
- James Dean as “Doggie” (uncredited)

== Production ==
=== Development and credits ===
According to the AFI Catalog of Feature Films, the film’s working titles included Old Soldiers Never Die and Rearguard. AFI also notes that a written prologue before the opening credits dedicates the film to the United States Infantry and thanks the U.S. Army for cooperation in the film’s preparation and production.

Although the onscreen credits state that the film was “suggested by” John Brophy’s novel The Immortal Sergeant, AFI reports that Fuller later described the screenplay as based on his own original story, and that studio production head Darryl F. Zanuck opted for the “suggested by” credit because Brophy’s novel also involved a timid soldier. Fuller similarly recounted that Zanuck wanted the story credit of Lamar Trotti added because the reluctant-leader premise resembled Fox’s earlier film Immortal Sergeant (1943).

=== Military adviser ===
Following difficulties obtaining cooperation on Fuller's earlier Korean War film The Steel Helmet, the production used Raymond Harvey—a Medal of Honor recipient—as technical adviser, a collaboration Fuller later repeated on Verboten! (1959).

=== Filming ===
A 2015 program note by the Harvard Film Archive states that the film was shot entirely on the studio lot while aiming for a sense of immediacy and subjective combat experience through voiceover passages.

=== James Dean appearance ===
James Dean appears briefly as a soldier nicknamed “Doggie” and was not credited onscreen.

== Release ==
AFI lists the film as a December 1951 release. The film opened in New York City on November 20, 1951.

== Reception ==
=== Contemporary reviews ===
In a contemporary review for the Los Angeles Times, critic Philip K. Scheuer wrote that Fuller had effectively revisited elements of The Steel Helmet, praising the film’s attention to the soldiers’ experience while noting potential reliance on stereotypes.

In The New York Times, critic Bosley Crowther was more reserved, describing the action as staged and the characters as conventional types despite an underlying admiration for soldiers’ endurance.

=== Box office ===
The film earned $1.45 million in U.S. rentals, according to Aubrey Solomon’s corporate history of Twentieth Century-Fox.

== Home media ==
Fixed Bayonets! was released on DVD by 20th Century Fox Home Entertainment on April 24, 2007. It was later issued on Blu-ray by Kino Lorber Studio Classics in September 2016.

== See also ==
- List of Korean War films
- The Steel Helmet
