= Waterfront (1950 film) =

British drama by Michael Anderson and Peter Ustinov

- Directed by: Michael Anderson
- Written by: John Brophy; Paul Soskin
- Based on: Waterfront by John Brophy
- Produced by: Paul Soskin
- Starring: Robert Newton; Kathleen Harrison; Susan Shaw
- Cinematography: Harry Waxman
- Edited by: Michael C. Chorlton
- Music by: Muir Mathieson
- Production company: Paul Soskin Productions (as Conqueror)
- Distributed by: General Film Distributors (UK)
- Release date: 26 July 1950 (London)
- Running time: 80 minutes
- Country: United Kingdom
- Language: English
- Budget: £121,200
- Box office: £90,000

Waterfront (also known as Waterfront Women) is a 1950 British black and white drama film directed by Michael Anderson and starring Robert Newton, Kathleen Harrison and Avis Scott. It was written by John Brophy and Paul Soskin based on the 1934 novel of the same name by Brophy.

It features a young (aged 25) Richard Burton in his third film appearance.

== Plot ==
When ship's fireman Peter McCabe goes to sea in 1919, he leaves his long-suffering wife impoverished, with two young daughters and a son born soon after his departure. Despite his assurances to his elder daughter, Nora, he does not return or even send word. The family live in a Liverpool slum near the waterfront. Nora grows to hate her absent father.

Young George Alexander McCabe, named after the actor George Alexander, is bright and at 12 wins a scholarship. The mother, Nora and George go to the Empire Theatre to celebrate. Here George in his enthusiasm accidentally strikes a man on the back of the head whilst waving his lollipop. That man, Ben, is attracted to Nora. He gets off on the wrong foot when she learns that he is an engineer on a ship, but he overcomes her resistance and a romance develops. Ben intends to marry her after his next voyage, but a severe economic slump idles the docks, putting Ben out of work for two years. Ben suggests ending their engagement, fearing that he is a burden to her, but Nora will have none of that.

McCabe returns unexpectedly after 14 years. After his current ship, the SS Benediction, docks in Liverpool, he rejects a demotion over his troublemaking ways and quits. Nora is none too pleased at her father's shocking reappearance. On his initial visit, he stays only briefly. After a dalliance with a blonde acquaintance, he learns of the existence of his son. He heads to the pub and drinks a lot of whisky. The second engineer of the Benediction appears and mocks McCabe. They brawl outside; he cuts the man's throat with a razor and is arrested. In a twist of fate, Ben comes on the scene and learns of the vacancy. He applies for the dead man's post straightaway and gets the job. The ship sails at midnight, so he can only send a note to Nora to tell her the news. When the police arrive to tell Mrs McCabe of her husband's arrest, Nora realises the coincidence with her father's own absences from home.

Instead of heading out to sea, the Benediction is diverted to Manchester for three days, giving Ben time to see Nora and insist they get married, which they do.

Mrs McCabe goes to the police station to see her husband, but he has been moved to Walton Jail. She visits him in his cell. When he asks, she confirms he has a son. George, waiting outside and wearing his school uniform, comes in and recites a Latin poem for his father.

== Cast ==
- Robert Newton as Peter McCabe
- Kathleen Harrison as Mrs McCabe
- Avis Scott as Nora McCabe
- Susan Shaw as Connie McCabe
- Robin Netscher as George Alexander McCabe
- Richard Burton as Ben Satterthwaite
- Kenneth Griffith as Maurice Bruno
- Olive Sloane as Mrs Gibson
- James Hayter as Ship's captain
- Charles Victor as Bill, tea and refreshments seller
- Michael Brennan as engineer
- Allan Jeayes as prison officer
- Hattie Jacques as music hall singer

== Critical reception ==
The Monthly Film Bulletin wrote: "Set in the rough, poverty-stricken atmosphere of Liverpool during the depression of the 'thirties, this a competent, well-photographed adaptation of John Brophy's novel; a film whose bare bones are refreshingly untrimmed. Capable performances from Robert Newton and Kathleen Harrison."

Variety said: "Some of Britain's top talent is wasted in this new Paul Soskin production. Meandering, inconsequential and casual yarn, contrived situation and vague direction, add up to make this a negative box-office proposition. ... Opportunities for dramatic color in the dockside settings of Liverpool are completely thrown away. Newton skilfully makes the best of every line, but it's even too much for him. Kathleen Harrison never has a chance as his long suffering and sympathetic wife."

Leslie Halliwell reviewed the film as: "Unintentionally funny melodrama which gives the actors a lot of trouble."

In British Sound Films: The Studio Years 1928–1959 David Quinlan wrote: "Dark drama free from sideline issues, rare straight role for Miss Harrison.''

Writing in the Radio Times, David Parkinson noted a "sobering and little-seen portrait of Liverpool in the Depression ... the film is undeniably melodramatic, but it has a surprisingly raw naturalism that suggests the influence of both Italian neorealism and the proud British documentary tradition. As the seaman whose drunken binges mean misery for his family and trouble for his shipmates, Robert Newton reins in his tendency for excess, and he receives solid support from the ever-dependable Kathleen Harrison and a young Richard Burton, in only his third feature."
