= Zoe Gail =

British singer and actress (1920–2020)

- Born: 20 February 1920; Cape Town, Cape Province, Union of South Africa
- Died: 20 February 2020 (aged 100); Las Vegas, Nevada, U.S.
- Occupations: Singer, actress
- Spouses: Hubert Gregg (m. 1943; div. 1950): Bert Bernard
- Children: Stacy Jefferson

Zoe Gail (born Zoe Margaret Stapelton; 20 February 1920 – 20 February 2020) was a South African-British singer and actress.

== Life and career ==
Gail was born Zoe Margaret Stapelton in Cape Town, Cape Province, Union of South Africa. She was known as a musical comedy star in London, headlining revues at the Comedy Theatre, the Hippodrome, and the Palladium. She had not, however gotten universal admiration when she first sang the song in Strike a New Note at the Prince of Wales Theatre in 1943. J B Priestley disapproved of her “strange, hermaphroditic garb”.

Her film appearances included No Orchids for Miss Blandish (1948), and she was on the television variety show Tonight at the London Palladium (1955).

Gail was chosen to switch on the lights at the West End of London in 1949 nearly a decade after they were turned off at the outbreak of World War II. She stood in a spotlight on the balcony of the Criterion Restaurant at Piccadilly Circus, dressed in black top hat, white tie and tails, she sang her hit song I’m Going to Get Lit Up When the Lights Go Up in London. Then she said "Abracadabra, hey Presto" and switched on the lights. She then quickly tossed her top hat into a crowd of ten thousand people.

== Personal life ==
Gail was married to Hubert Gregg with whom she had one child, actress Stacey Jefferson, and also married to Bert Bernard.

=== 1951 accident ===
While on honeymoon in France, Gail and her new husband were involved in a road accident, which resulted in her leg being virtually crushed from knee to ankle. Despite Drs advising she many never be able to walk again, she recovered sufficiently to perform again at London's Cafe de Paris in January 1953

=== Death ===
On 20 February 2020, Zoe Gail died in Las Vegas, Nevada on her 100th birthday.
