= Jean Willes =

American actress (1923–1989)

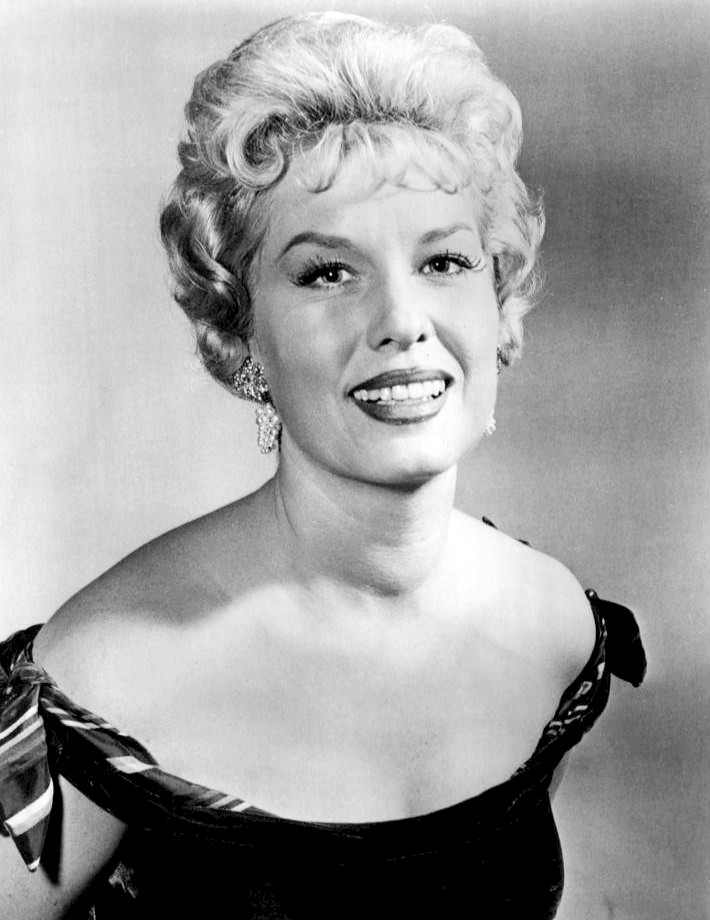
- Willes in 1960
- Born: Jean Willes (April 15, 1923 – January 3, 1989); April 15, 1923; Los Angeles, California, U.S.
- Died: January 3, 1989 (aged 65); Los Angeles, California, U.S.
- Years active: 1934–1972
- Spouse(s): Gerard Cowhig (m. 1951) Frank Donahue (1944-1947)
- Children: 1

Jean Willes (April 15, 1923 – January 3, 1989) was an American film and television actress. She appeared in approximately 65 films in her 38-year career. Willes is familiar to modern viewers for her roles in several Three Stooges short subjects.

== Early years ==
She was born in Los Angeles to William Simmons Willes and Velma Harrington Duncan Willes, and spent part of her childhood in Seattle and part in Salt Lake City. After she and her parents returned to Los Angeles, she began acting with a little theater group there. She married Frank Donahue in 1944, and played small roles in feature films for Paramount Pictures.

== Career ==
She signed with Columbia Pictures in 1946, using her married name Jean Donahue until she and Donahue divorced in 1947. Her first Columbia effort was a two-reel comedy short starring the team of Gus Schilling & Richard Lane, where she played the unlikely role of a cuckoo in a clock (and wore a feathered costume). Short-subject writer and director Edward Bernds enjoyed her work, and cast her often in Columbia shorts and features like Blondie Knows Best, in which she displayed excellent comedy timing as a flustered nurse. Jean Willes made two dozen shorts with almost all of the Columbia short-subject stars: The Three Stooges (Monkey Businessmen, A Snitch in Time, Don't Throw That Knife, Gypped in the Penthouse), Andy Clyde, Hugh Herbert, Bert Wheeler, Wally Vernon & Eddie Quillan, Max Baer & Maxie Rosenbloom, Shemp Howard, Joe DeRita, Sterling Holloway, Harry Von Zell, and Eddie Foy, Jr. When her friend Edward Bernds left Columbia in 1952, Willes also left the Columbia comedy unit, returning only once for a Three Stooges comedy in 1955.

As she gained experience before the camera, her roles increased in size and she proved capable of playing ingenues, villains, and character roles. Usually a brunette, she sometimes wore blonde wigs as each role demanded. She was versatile, her roles ranging from upright military officers to hard-boiled B-girls. Edward Bernds recruited her for a Bowery Boys comedy, Bowery to Bagdad. She was one of the "four queens" pursuing Clark Gable in The King and Four Queens (1956). Later that year she appeared as nurse Sally Withers in the original movie version of Invasion of the Body Snatchers. She also played a good-time gambler opposite Ernest Borgnine in the feature film McHale's Navy.

== Television ==
She made the transition to television, debuting in an episode of Boston Blackie. She appeared in dozens of series in varied roles and genres such as Westerns and anthology series; Crossroads; The Californians; Richard Diamond, Private Detective with David Janssen; several episodes of the Burns and Allen television series titled The George Burns and Gracie Allen Show; in the 1956 television show The Great Gildersleeve as the scheming girlfriend Eva Jane in the episode "One Too Many Secretaries"; The Twilight Zone ("Will the Real Martian Please Stand Up?"); four episodes of Bonanza between 1959 and 1968; Hazel; Trackdown ("The Bounty Hunter" with Robert Culp and Steve McQueen); The Munsters; Perry Mason; The Alfred Hitchcock Hour; Bat Masterson with Gene Barry; The Beverly Hillbillies with Buddy Ebsen; Tombstone Territory; Dick Powell's Zane Grey Theatre; Walt Disney's Zorro with Guy Williams; and Kojak with Telly Savalas.

In 1958, in the episode "Queen of the Cimarron" of the syndicated western television series Frontier Doctor, starring Rex Allen, Willes portrayed Fancy Varden, the owner of the Golden Slipper Saloon who attempts to establish her own cattle empire with animals infected with anthrax.

Willes portrayed Belle Starr in a 1959 episode of the ABC/Warner Brothers Western series Maverick entitled "Full House," in which Joel Grey played Billy the Kid and James Garner performed a bravura pistol-twirling exhibition woven into the plot. In the same year for Warners she played Anna Sage in The FBI Story. Willes played the character Ruth in the Wanted: Dead or Alive episode, "The Eager Man", Manila Jones in "The Montana Kid", and Meghan Francis in "The Kovack Affair".

Willes played Amelia Monk in the 1967 episode, "Siege at Amelia's Kitchen", on the syndicated anthology series, Death Valley Days hosted by Robert Taylor.

== Personal life ==
Willes's first husband was Frank Donahue (from 1944 to 1947). Her second husband was NFL football player Gerard Cowhig. The couple had one son, Gerry.

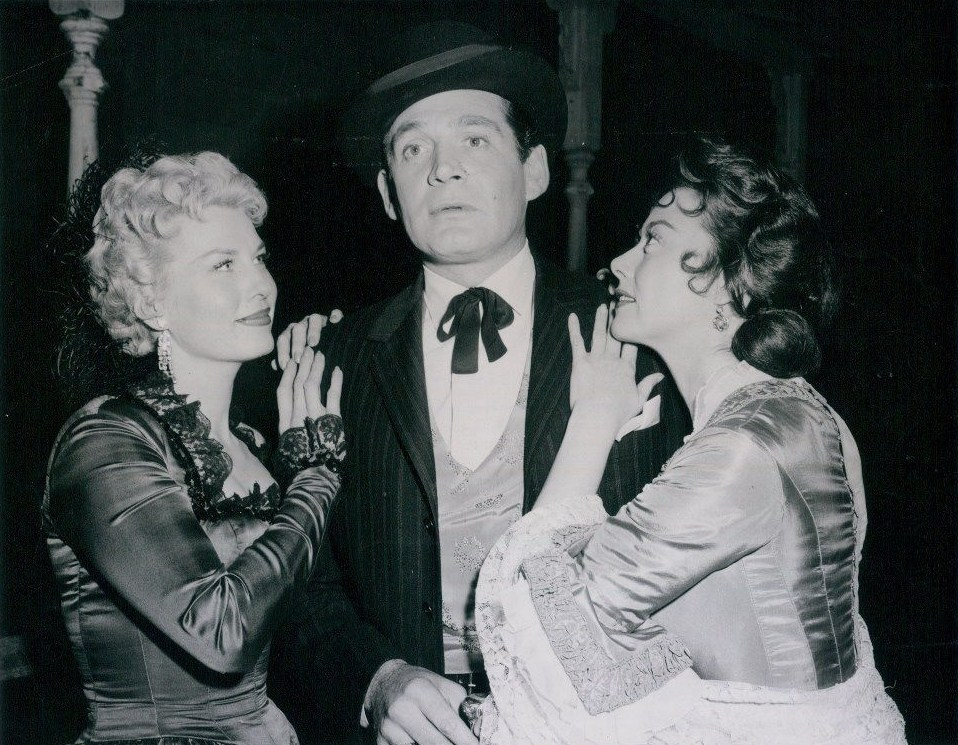
With Gene Barry and Adele Mara (1958)

== Death ==
Willes died of liver cancer in Van Nuys, California on January 3, 1989. She was 65 years of age. She is buried in San Fernando Mission Cemetery in Mission Hills, California.

== Selected filmography ==
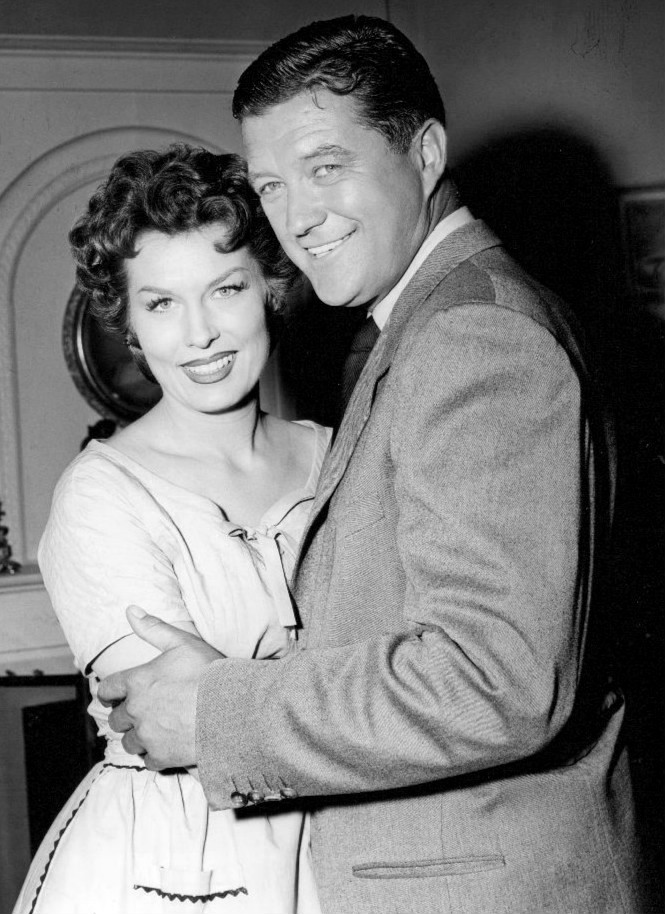
Willes and Dennis Morgan (1955)

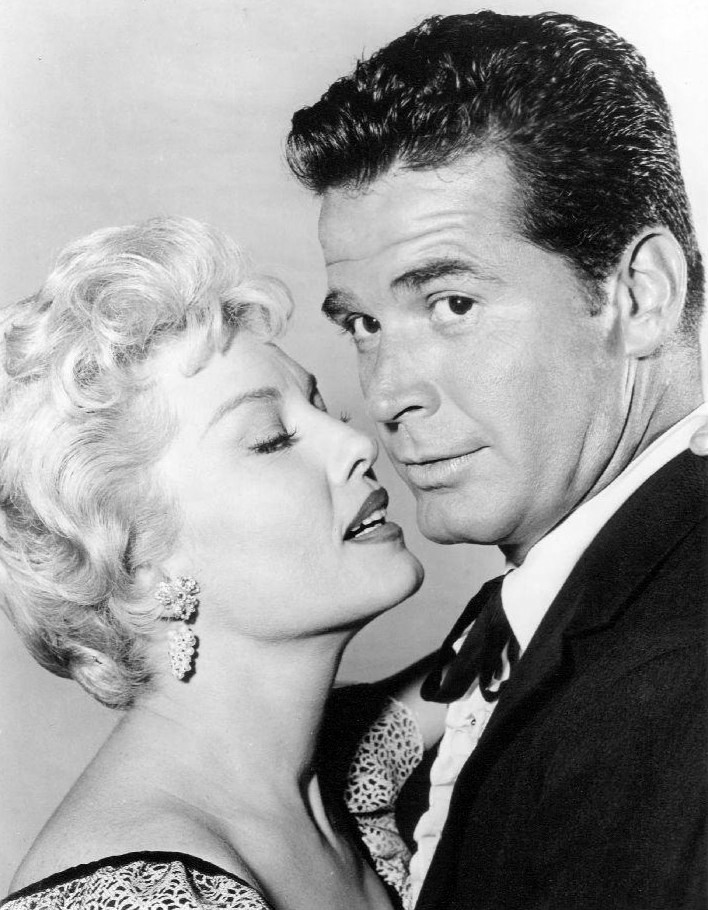
Willes and James Garner (1960)

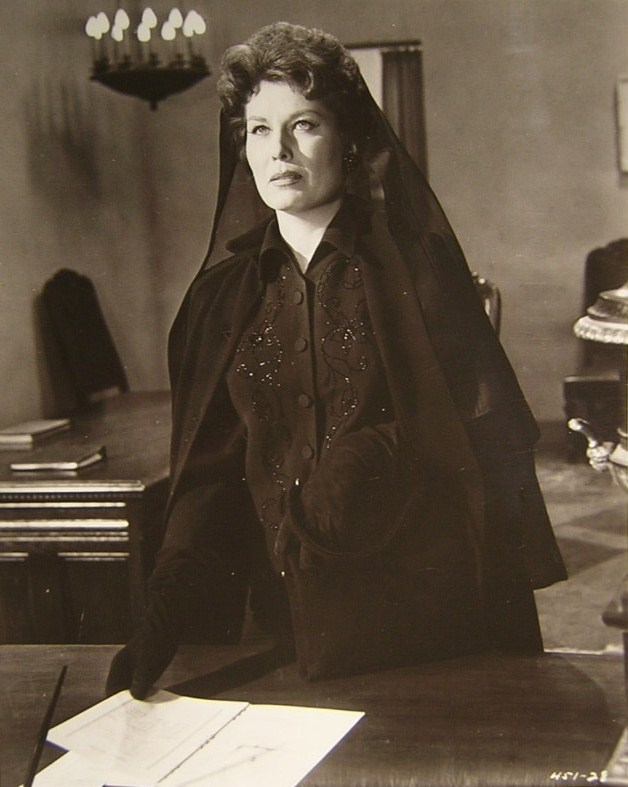
Willes in Ocean's 11 (1960)

- So Proudly We Hail! (1943) as Lieutenant Carol Johnson
- Here Come the Waves (1944) as Johnny Cabot Fan (uncredited)
- Salty O'Rourke (1945) as The Other Girl (uncredited)
- You Came Along (1945) as Showgirl (uncredited)
- Incendiary Blonde (1945) as Nightclub Patron (uncredited)
- Monkey Businessmen (1946, short) as Nurse Shapely (uncredited)
- Sing While You Dance (1946) as Miss Flint
- Blondie Knows Best (1946) as Dr. Titus's Nurse (uncredited)
- Cigarette Girl (1947) as D.A.'s Secretary (uncredited)
- Down to Earth (1947) as Betty
- Blondie in the Dough (1947) as Miss Marsh, Thorpe's Secretary (uncredited)
- The Mating of Millie (1948) as Party Girl (uncredited)
- The Winner's Circle (1948) as Jean Trent
- Chinatown at Midnight (1949) as Alice
- A Woman of Distinction (1950) as Pearl – Switchboard Operator (uncredited)
- Kill the Umpire (1950) as Pretty Girl (uncredited)
- David Harding, Counterspy (1950) as Nurse (uncredited)
- The Petty Girl (1950) as Fleeing Chorine (uncredited)
- The Fuller Brush Girl (1950) as Mary (uncredited)
- Emergency Wedding (1950) as Guest (uncredited)
- A Snitch in Time (1950, short) as Miss Gladys Scudder
- Revenue Agent (1950) as Marge King
- Don't Throw That Knife (1951, short) as Lucy Wyckoff
- Never Trust a Gambler (1951) as The Brunette at Police Station (uncredited)
- The Family Secret (1951) as Cigarette Girl (uncredited)
- Hula-La-La (1951, short) as Luana
- The First Time (1952) as Fawn Wallace (uncredited)
- Jungle Jim in the Forbidden Land (1952) as Denise
- The Sniper (1952) as Woman on Street (uncredited)
- A Yank in Indo-China (1952) as Cleo
- Gobs and Gals (1952) as Mrs. Riley – Gerrens' Secretary (uncredited)
- Son of Paleface (1952) as Penelope (uncredited)
- Torpedo Alley (1952) as Peggy Moran (uncredited)
- All Ashore (1953) as Rose
- Abbott and Costello Go to Mars (1953) as Captain Olivia
- Run for the Hills (1953) as Frances Veach
- From Here to Eternity (1953) as Annette, club receptionist (uncredited)
- The Glass Web (1953) as Sonia
- A Star Is Born (1954) as Fan at benefit show (uncredited)
- Masterson of Kansas (1954) as Dallas Corey – aka Mrs. Bennett
- Bowery to Bagdad (1955) as Claire Culpepper
- 5 Against the House (1955) as Virginia
- Gypped in the Penthouse (1955, short) as Jane
- Count Three and Pray (1955) as Selma (uncredited)
- Bobby Ware Is Missing (1955) as Janet Ware
- The Lieutenant Wore Skirts (1956) as Joan Sweeney
- Invasion of the Body Snatchers (1956) as Nurse Sally Withers
- The Revolt of Mamie Stover (1956) as Gladys
- Toward the Unknown (1956) as Carmen (uncredited)
- The King and Four Queens (1956) as Ruby McDade
- The Man Who Turned to Stone (1957) as Tracy
- Hell on Devil's Island (1957) as Suzanne
- The Tijuana Story (1957) as Liz March
- Hear Me Good (1957) as Rita Hall
- Perry Mason (1957) - Anita Bonsal
- Decision (1958, TV series) "The Tall Man" as Laura Dawson
- Desire Under the Elms (1958) as Florence Cabot
- Trackdown (1958) "The Bounty Hunter" as Jannette York
- No Time for Sergeants (1958) as WAF Captain
- Official Detective (1958, TV Series) as Pat Dengue
- Lawman (1958, TV Series) as Kate Wilson
- These Thousand Hills (1959) as Jen
- Bat Masterson (1959) as Grace Williams
- The FBI Story (1959) as Anna Sage
- Yancy Derringer (1960, TV Series) as Jessie Belle
- Elmer Gantry (1960) as Prostitute (uncredited)
- Ocean's 11 (1960) as Gracie Bergdof
- The Crowded Sky (1960) as Gloria Panawek
- By Love Possessed (1961) as Junie McCarthy
- The Twilight Zone (1961, TV Series) "Will the Real Martian Please Stand Up?" as Ethel McConnell, the dancer
- Gun Street (1961) as Joan Brady
- Gypsy (1962) as Betty Cratchitt
- The Alfred Hitchcock Hour (1963) (Season 1 Episode 32: "Death of a Cop") as Eva
- The Beverly Hillbillies (1964) (Season 2 Episode 26: "Another Neighbor") as Countess Maria
- The Munsters (1964) (Season 1 Episode 9) as Mrs. Cartwright
- McHale's Navy (1964) as Margot Monet
- The Beverly Hillbillies (1965) (Season 3 Episode 26: "Jed and the Countess") as Countess Maria
- Bonanza (1968) as Mrs. O'Brien
- The Cheyenne Social Club (1970) as Alice
- Bite the Bullet (1975) as Rosie
