= Stacey Gregg =

British actress

Stacey Gregg, also credited as Stacey Maxwell and Stacey Jefferson, is a British actress. She played Sandy in the original London stage production of Grease opposite Richard Gere, and also played the character Lynn Baxter in Crossroads. She also worked as a voice actor, including the characters Vixen and Adder in the 1993 TV series The Animals of Farthing Wood.

== Early life and education ==
Gregg was born in Montagu Square, London, the daughter of the composer Hubert Gregg and the singer Zoe Gail. Her parents divorced when she was a baby and was she was brought up by a nanny. In 1951, Gregg's mother married the American vaudeville performer Bert Bernard (né Herbert James Maxwell). Gregg spent most of her early life in the US, being schooled in New York and Boston. Following school, she moved to Las Vegas to be with her mother and stepfather, and appeared in his show The Bernard Brothers.

== Career ==
Gregg took her stepfather's name and was credited as Stacey Maxwell in a number of US prime-time TV shows, including The Virginian (playing "a mentally retarded child"), Ironside and The Monkees.

Having returned to the UK, Gregg played the principal girl, Princess Balroubadour in Aladdin at the London Palladium, which opened 22 December 1970.

In 1971 she played the character Daffy (Daffodil Primrose O'Kelly) in the ITV comedy series Tottering Towers. In 1973 Gregg played the role of Sandy in the first British stage production of the musical Grease at the Coventry Theatre, continuing in the role when it moved to the New London Theatre in the West End.

In the late 1970s she played the character Lynn Baxter, a hospital nurse, in Crossroads.

Gregg voiced the characters Vixen and Adder in the acclaimed TV series The Animals of Farthing Wood. She was also the voice of Rosa in the Japanese cartoon Makyu Senjo (1998) and provided voices for the Moomin TV series.

== Writing ==
Gregg published a book of poetry, The Bra-less Poet, and a novel, St Tropez. She wrote the theme music for the television series Marked Personal.

== Personal life ==
Gregg's second husband was the Canadian author Charles Dennis. She appeared in an episode of Celebrity Squares in 1978.
