= Target Island =

1944 novel

- American first edition
- Author: John Brophy
- Language: English
- Genre: War
- Publisher: Collins (UK); Harper (US)
- Publication date: 1944
- Publication place: United Kingdom
- Media type: Print

Target Island is a 1944 war novel by the British writer John Brophy. It was published by Collins in London and Harper in New York. It takes place during the Axis Siege of Malta during the Second World War. While popular, it did not repeat the great success of Brophy's previous novel Immortal Sergeant set during the North African Campaign. John Hampson writing in The Spectator gave it a fairly negative review alongside Vicki Baum's Berlin Hotel and noted "here again are major and minor figures, love-affairs, raids, and alarms, amid the panoply of modern war. And yet nothing has been added to the epic of Malta that we didn't already know. However, its film possibilities will be obvious to the cinema fan". In the event the novel was not adapted for the screen unlike several others of Brophy's work, although much of its settings and themes featured in the 1953 film Malta Story.

== Bibliography ==
- Watson, George & Willison, Ian R. The New Cambridge Bibliography of English Literature, Volume 4. CUP, 1972.
