= The Day They Robbed the Bank of England (novel) =

1959 novel

- British first edition
- Author: John Brophy
- Language: English
- Genre: Crime
- Publisher: Chatto & Windus
- Publication date: 1959
- Publication place: United Kingdom
- Media type: Print

The Day They Robbed the Bank of England is a 1959 crime novel by the British writer John Brophy.

== Adaptation ==
The following year it was made into a film of the same title directed by John Guillermin and starring Aldo Ray, Elizabeth Sellars and Peter O'Toole.

== Bibliography ==
- Goble, Alan. The Complete Index to Literary Sources in Film. Walter de Gruyter, 1999.
- Watson, George & Willison, Ian R. The New Cambridge Bibliography of English Literature, Volume 4. CUP, 1972.
