= Gerard Cowhig =

American football player (1921–1995)

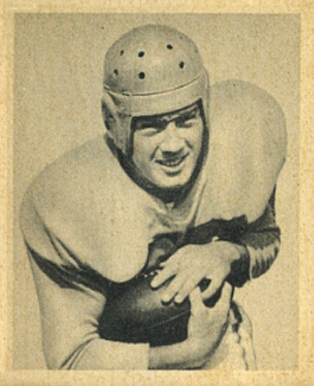
- Cowhig on a 1948 Bowman football card

No. 9, 36
- Position: Linebacker / fullback / defensive back

Personal information
- Born: July 5, 1921; Boston, Massachusetts, U.S.
- Died: December 6, 1995 (aged 74); Van Nuys, California, U.S.
- Listed height: 6 ft 2 in (1.88 m)
- Listed weight: 215 lb (98 kg)

Career information
- High school: Marianapolis (Thompson, Connecticut)
- College: Notre Dame (1941–1942, 1946)
- NFL draft: 1945: 6th round, 48th overall pick

Career history
- Los Angeles Rams (1947–1949); Chicago Cardinals (1950); Philadelphia Eagles (1951)

Awards and highlights
- National champion (1946)

Career NFL statistics
- Rushing yards: 342
- Rushing average: 4.2
- Receptions: 3
- Receiving yards: 18
- Total touchdowns: 5
- Stats at Pro Football Reference

Gerard Finbar Cowhig (July 5, 1921 – December 6, 1995) was an American professional football player who played five seasons in the National Football League (NFL) with the Los Angeles Rams, Chicago Cardinals and Philadelphia Eagles. He was selected by the Cleveland Rams in the sixth round of the 1945 NFL draft after playing college football at the University of Notre Dame.

== Early life and college ==
Gerard Finbar Cowhig was born on July 5, 1921, in Boston, Massachusetts. He attended Mechanic Arts High School in Boston, Massachusetts and Marianapolis Preparatory School in Thompson, Connecticut.

Cowhig was a member of the Notre Dame Fighting Irish from 1941 to 1942. His football career was interrupted by a stint in the United States Army during World War II. He played his final season at Notre Dame in 1946, rushing 40 times for 199 yards and catching four passes for 42 yards. The 1946 Fighting Irish were AP Poll national champions.

== Professional career ==
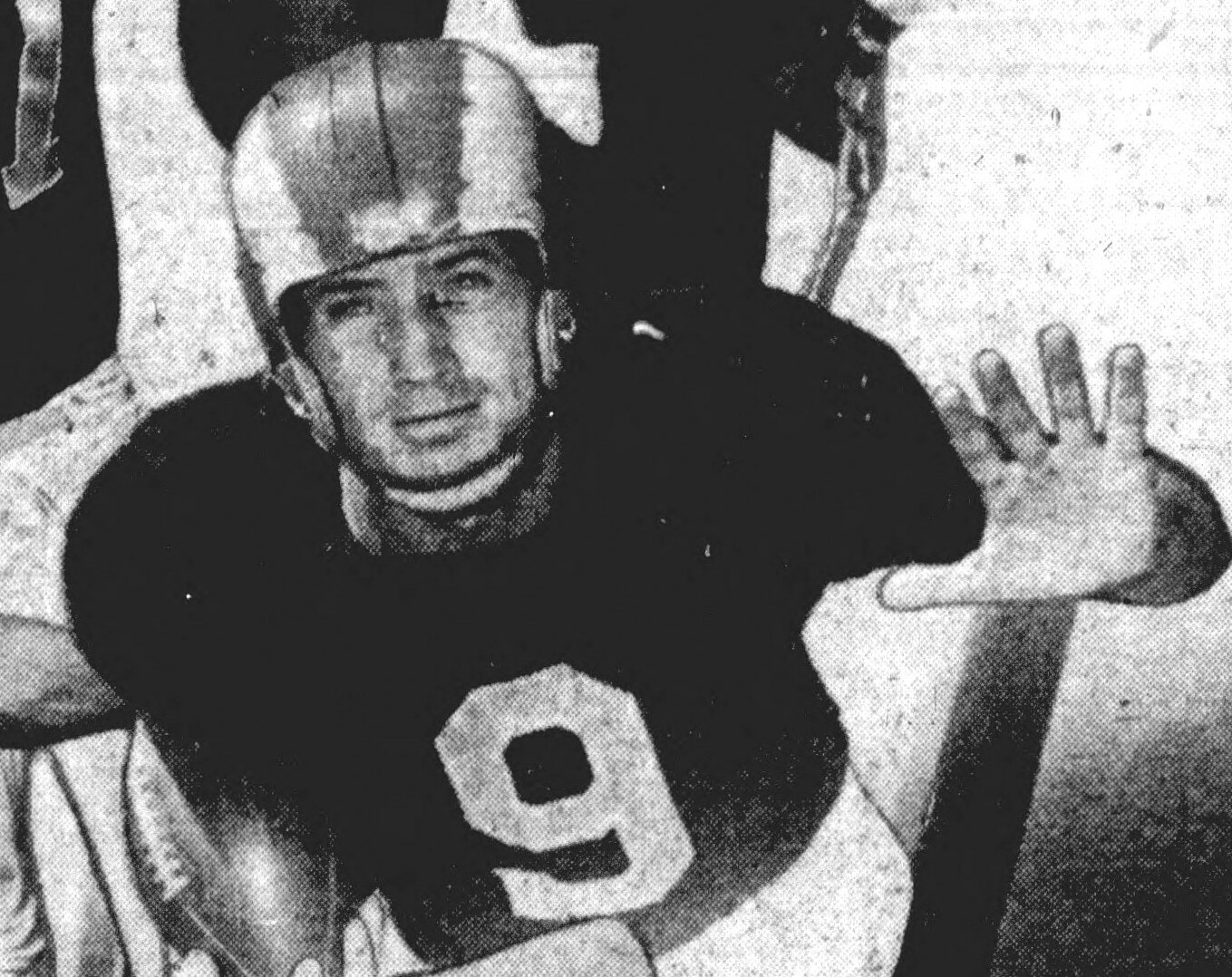
Cowhig with the Los Angeles Rams

Cowhig was selected by the Cleveland Rams in the sixth round, with the 48th overall pick, of the 1945 NFL draft. He was also selected by the Cleveland Browns in the second round, with the 16th overall pick, of the 1947 AAFC draft. He signed with the previously renamed Los Angeles Rams on June 21, 1947. He played in eight games, starting four, for the Rams during his rookie year in 1947, recording 25 rushes for 104 yards, one interception, two fumbles, one fumble recovery, and two kick returns for 29 yards. Cowhig became a free agent after the 1947 season and re-signed with the Rams on July 12, 1948. He appeared in all 12 games, starting three, during the 1948 season, totaling 46 carries for 206 yards and two touchdowns, three catches for 18 yards, and one interception. He played in 11 games, starting one, for the Rams in 1949, accumulating ten rushing attempts for 32 and one touchdown, four interceptions that he returned for 62 yards and a touchdown, and two kick returns for 20 yards. He also played in one playoff game that year.

On June 2, 1950, Cowhig, Bob Shaw, and Tom Keane were traded to the Chicago Cardinals for Bob Reinhard. Cowhig appeared in all 12 games for the Cardinals in 1950 but did not record any statistics. He became a free agent after the season.

He signed with the Philadelphia Eagles in 1951. He played in 11 games, starting nine, for the Eagles in 1951, returning three fumbles for 25 yards and one touchdown. He became a free agent after the season.

Cowhig was signed by the San Francisco 49ers in 1952 but was later released.

== Personal life ==
Cowhig was married to actress Jean Willes and they had one son named Gerry. Gerard died on December 6, 1995, in Van Nuys, California.

Cowhig appeared in the 1949 film Easy Living as a football player. On August 19, 1959, he crashed his car into a "concrete light standard" and was treated at Hollywood Receiving Hospital for a "possible fractured left hand and minor head injuries". The car was demolished.
