= Turn the Key Softly (novel) =

1951 novel

- British first edition
- Author: John Brophy
- Cover artist: Kenneth Farnhill
- Language: English
- Genre: Drama
- Publisher: Collins
- Publication date: 1951
- Publication place: United Kingdom
- Media type: Print

Turn the Key Softly is a 1951 novel by the British writer John Brophy. It follows the lives of three women in the first dozen hours after they are released from prison.

== Adaptation ==
In 1953 it was made into a film of the same title directed by Jack Lee and starring Yvonne Mitchell, Joan Collins and Terence Morgan.

== Bibliography ==
- Goble, Alan. The Complete Index to Literary Sources in Film. Walter de Gruyter, 1999.
- Watson, George & Willison, Ian R. The New Cambridge Bibliography of English Literature, Volume 4. CUP, 1972.
