= Henry Kulky =

American actor (1911–1965)

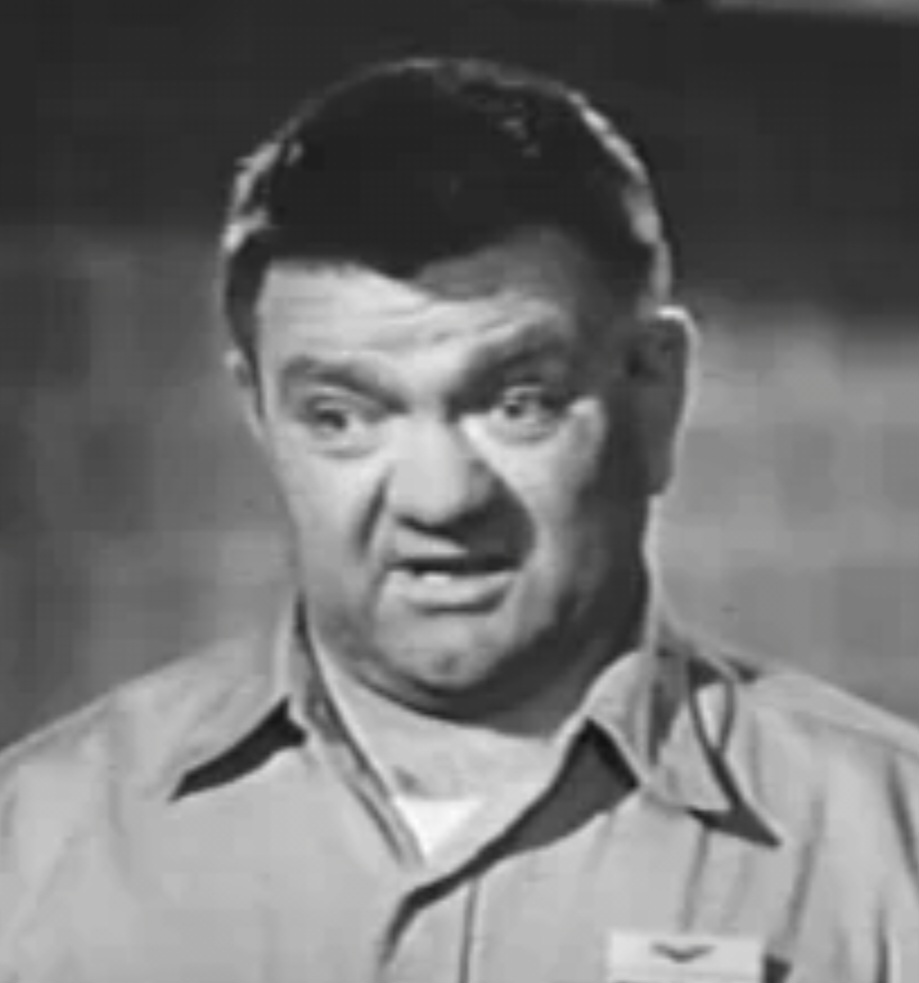
- Kulky in The Life of Riley (1954)
- Born: Henry Kulakowich; August 11, 1911; Hastings-on-Hudson, New York, U.S.
- Died: February 12, 1965 (aged 53); Oceanside, California, U.S.
- Resting place: Evergreen Cemetery (Oakland, California)
- Other names: Bomber Kulkovich; Henry "Bomber" Kulkovich; Henry Kulkowich; Henry "Bomber" Kulky
- Occupation: Actor
- Years active: 1947–1965

Henry Kulky (born Henry Kulakowich; August 11, 1911 – February 12, 1965) was an American actor and professional wrestler from Hastings-on-Hudson, New York, probably best remembered as Chief Petty Officer Curly Jones from season 1 of Voyage to the Bottom of the Sea.

== Career ==
Kulky began boxing in his teenage years. After six bouts, he stopped boxing when he was offered a position training wrestlers at St. Matthew's Lyceum in his native Hastings-on-Hudson.

Stanislaus Zbyszko convinced Kulky to compete professionally in 1939. Moving to Argentina, Kulky competed throughout South America under the ring name Bomber Kulkavich. The number of matches in which he competed is uncertain; one claim states that he won 172 of 175 matches. Kulky, however, claims that he won nearly all of 7,000 matches. While in South America, he is also said to have won the continent's judo crown.

Like most wrestlers who turned to acting in the 1950s, he owed his big break to Mike Mazurki. The two appeared in several parts in the 1940s and 1950s, with Mazurki's agent getting him a part in Call Northside 777.

Because of his tough guy image, Kulky became typecast as military men, thugs, gangsters, bartenders, wrestlers, and other "strong guys" who were at times friendly and lovable. From 1953 to 1958, he played Otto Schmidlap in the television series The Life of Riley. In the series, Kulky portrayed a co-worker of series character Chester Riley, a wing riveter at an aircraft plant. In 1952, he appeared in an episode (#11) of Adventures of Superman as a wrestler working for a crooked promoter. In 1954, he appeared in an episode (#141) of The Lone Ranger. From 1959 to 1962, Kulky was cast in the recurring role as Chief Max Bronsky in forty-six episodes of Jackie Cooper's CBS military sitcom-drama television series Hennesey. The role was close to Kulky's heart, because during World War II, he was a boatswain's mate in the United States Navy.

Kulky's last role was as Chief Curley Jones in the television series Voyage to the Bottom of the Sea.

== Death ==
Kulky died on February 12, 1965, in Oceanside, California, of a heart attack suffered while he was studying a script. He is buried in the Evergreen Cemetery (Oakland, California).

== Selected filmography ==
- A Likely Story (1947) - Tremendo
- Northwest Outpost (1947) - Peasant (uncredited)
- Alias a Gentleman (1948) - Moving Man (scenes deleted)
- Call Northside 777 (1948) - First Bartender (uncredited)
- To the Ends of the Earth (1948) - Giant Chinese Man (uncredited)
- A Foreign Affair (1948) - Russian Soldier at Marketplace (uncredited)
- Tarzan's Magic Fountain (1949) - Vredak (uncredited)
- State Department: File 649 (1949) - Mongolian Sergeant (uncredited)
- Take Me Out to the Ball Game (1949) - Acrobat (uncredited)
- Mighty Joe Young (1949) - Strongman (uncredited)
- The Red Danube (1949) - Russian Officer at Camp 12 Deportation (uncredited)
- Alias the Champ (1949) - Bomber Kulkovich
- Bandits of El Dorado (1949) - Bartender Spade (uncredited)
- Bodyhold (1949) - Mike Kalumbo
- Wabash Avenue (1950) - Joe Barton
- Jiggs and Maggie Out West (1950) - 'Bomber' Kulkowich
- Kill the Umpire (1950) - Baseball Fan (uncredited)
- Love That Brute (1950) - Mug (uncredited)
- South Sea Sinner (1950) - Bartender
- A Snitch in Time (1950, Short) - Steve (uncredited)
- Charlie's Haunt (1950)
- Force of Arms (1951) - Sgt. Reiser (uncredited)
- The Guy Who Came Back (1951) - Wizard, Wrestler
- You Never Can Tell (1951) - Gorilla - Wrestler / Prisoner (uncredited)
- Love Nest (1951) - George Thompson
- The Kid from Amarillo (1951) - Zeno
- Fixed Bayonets! (1951) - Vogl (uncredited)
- Red Skies of Montana (1952) - Dawson (uncredited)
- Gobs and Gals (1952) - Boris
- Red Planet Mars (1952) - Military Guard (uncredited)
- The World in His Arms (1952) - Peter, Russian Servant
- Down Among the Sheltering Palms (1952) - First Sergeant Jones
- What Price Glory (1952) - Company Cook (uncredited)
- Because You're Mine (1952) - Sergeant (uncredited)
- My Wife's Best Friend (1952) - Pug (uncredited)
- No Holds Barred (1952) - Mike the Mauler
- The Adventures of Wild Bill Hickok (1952-1955, TV Series) - King / Referee
- Rogue's March (1953) - Russian Fisherman-Spy (uncredited)
- Target Hong Kong (1953) - Dutch Pfeifer
- Confidentially Connie (1953) - Meckle - the Butcher (uncredited)
- The Glory Brigade (1953) - Sgt. 'Smitty' Smitkowsky
- Powder River (1953) - Bartender
- The 5,000 Fingers of Dr. T. (1953) - Stroogo (uncredited)
- The Charge at Feather River (1953) - Pvt. Smiley
- Clipped Wings (1953) - Sgt. Broski (uncredited)
- A Lion Is in the Streets (1953) - Polli's Butler (uncredited)
- The Abbott and Costello Show (1953, TV Series) - Mulligan
- The Life of Riley (1953-1958, TV Series) - Otto Schmidlap / Feeney's Big Goon
- Yukon Vengeance (1954) - Schmidt
- Hell and High Water (1954) - Gunner McCrossin (uncredited)
- New Faces (1954) - Mr. Dee (uncredited)
- Phantom of the Rue Morgue (1954) - Maurice - Sailor (uncredited)
- Fireman Save My Child (1954) - Harry
- Tobor the Great (1954) - Paul - Spy-Henchman
- The Human Jungle (1954) - Matty
- A Star Is Born (1954) - Cuddles (uncredited)
- The Steel Cage (1954) - George, Convict (segment "The Chef")
- Prince of Players (1955) - Bartender (uncredited)
- Abbott and Costello Meet the Keystone Kops (1955) - Brakeman (uncredited)
- New York Confidential (1955) - Gino
- Love Me or Leave Me (1955) - Bouncer (uncredited)
- Finger Man (1955) - Louie (uncredited)
- Francis in the Navy (1955) - Auction Bidder (uncredited)
- To Hell and Back (1955) - Sgt. Stack (uncredited)
- It's Always Fair Weather (1955) - Drunk in Bar (uncredited)
- Jail Busters (1955) - Marty (uncredited)
- The Girl in the Red Velvet Swing (1955) - Prisoner (uncredited)
- Illegal (1955) - Taylor
- I'll Cry Tomorrow (1955) - Barfly (uncredited)
- It's a Dog's Life (1955) - Grainger (uncredited)
- The Girl Can't Help It (1956) - Iceman (uncredited)
- All Mine to Give (1957) - Drunk (uncredited)
- Sierra Stranger (1957) - Bartender Matt
- Bombers B-52 (1957) - Calvin (uncredited)
- Up Periscope (1959) - Chief Petty Officer York
- Compulsion (1959) - Tough Waiter (uncredited)
- The Gunfight at Dodge City (1959) - Charlie the Bartender (uncredited)
- Guns of the Timberland (1960) - Logger
- New Comedy Showcase (1960, TV series) - Townsperson
- Pete and Gladys (1962, TV Series) - Charlie Fox
- All Fall Down (1962) - Sailor (uncredited)
- Hennesey (1960–1962, TV Series) - Chief Max Bronsky
- Going My Way (1963, TV Series) - Mr. Rice
- A Global Affair (1964) - Charlie - Newsstand Proprietor (uncredited)
- Bonanza (1964, TV Series) - Bearcat Sampson (Episode: "Old Sheba")
- Voyage to the Bottom of the Sea (1964–1965, TV Series) - Chief Curley Jones (final appearance)
