= Adak National Forest =

Forest in Alaska, United States

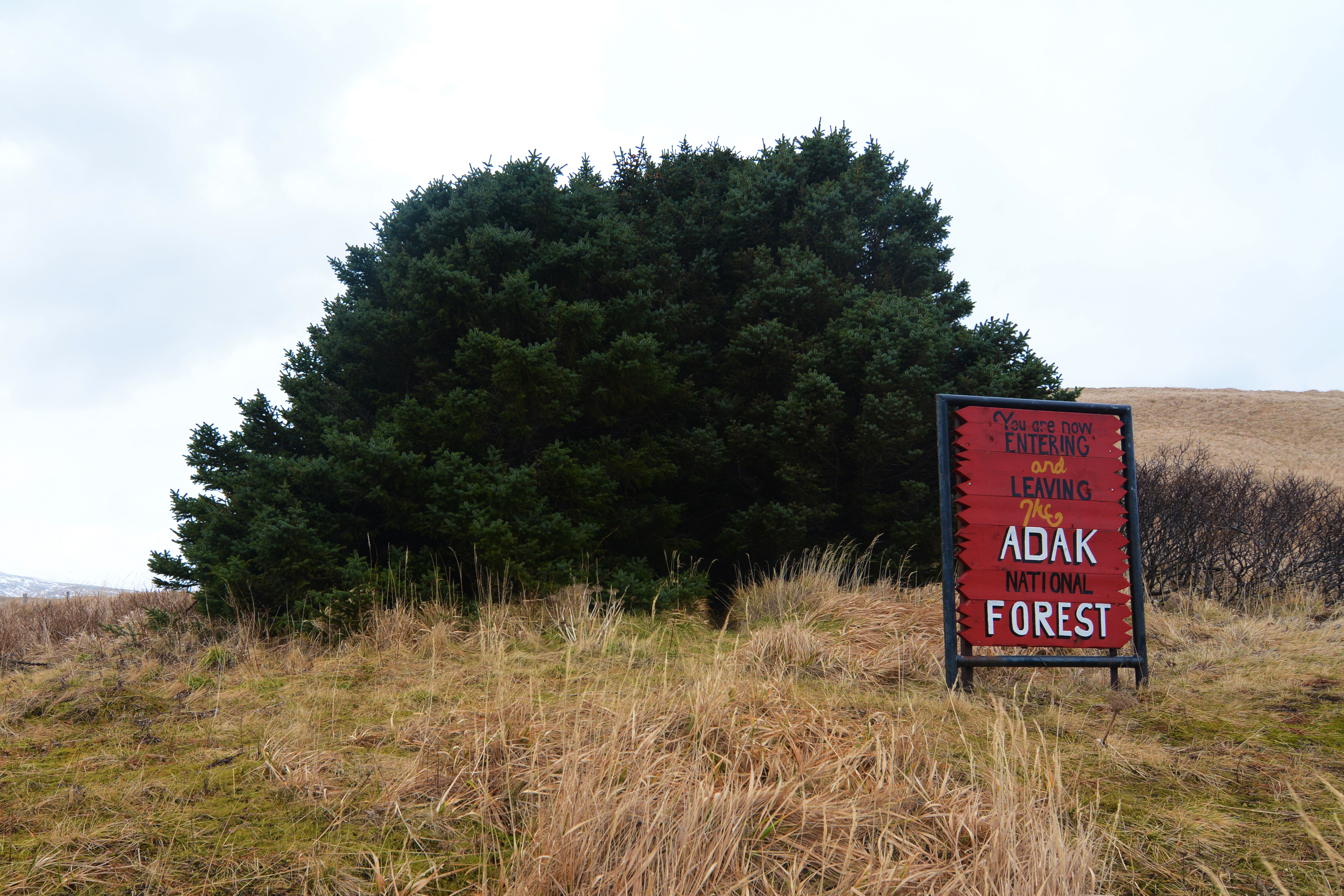
- The forest in 2015

- Location within Alaska
- Interactive map of Adak National Forest

Geography
- Coordinates: 51.9031°N 176.6221°W
- Area: 40 ft (12 m) across

Administration
- Established: 1943

Adak National Forest is a small forest on Adak Island in Alaska. It consists of 33 spruce trees that have clustered together at the base of a small hill. The forest measures 40 ft (12 m) across and is less than 17 ft (5.2 m) tall.

== History ==
The trees were planted by the U.S. military during World War II. It was meant to boost the morale of soldiers stationed on the island. Simon Buckner, the general, thought that planting Christmas trees on the barren island would help encourage the soldiers through their winters during the war. He began a tree-planting program that lasted from 1943 to 1945.

Most of the pines did not survive the initial planting, due to the Alaskan climate. Soon, only one tree remained. However, some trees were able to regrow and form a copse of dwarfed trees. A sign reading "You are now entering and leaving the Adak National Forest" was placed in the early 1960s. Aleutian locals decorate the trees for Christmas season annually.
