= Hubert Gregg =

British broadcaster, writer and actor (1914–2004)

Hubert Gregg MBE
- Born: 19 July 1914; London, England
- Died: 29 March 2004 (aged 89); Eastbourne, East Sussex, England
- Occupations: Broadcaster, writer, actor
- Spouses: Zoe Gail (m. 1943; div. 1950) Pat Kirkwood (m. 1956; div. 1979) Carmel Lytton (m. 1980)
- Children: 3, including Stacy Jefferson

Hubert Robert Harry Gregg (19 July 1914 – 29 March 2004) was a British broadcaster, writer and actor. In his later years, he was known for the BBC Radio 2 "oldies" shows A Square Deal and Thanks for the Memory. He was also a novelist, theatre director and hit songwriter.

== Biography ==
Gregg was born in Islington, north London. He attended St Dunstan's College and the Webber Douglas School of Singing and Dramatic Art.

Gregg worked as an announcer for the BBC Empire Service in 1934 and 1935, while intermittently performing in repertory theatre. He appeared on Broadway in Terence Rattigan's comedy French Without Tears from 28 September 1937 to January 1938.

In the Second World War, Gregg first served as a private with the Lincolnshire Regiment in 1939, before becoming an officer in the 60th Rifles the following year. He spoke German fluently, and worked for the BBC German service, to such good effect that Goebbels assumed he must be a German traitor. He was invalided out in 1943. Among the "more than 200 songs" he wrote was the wartime hit "I'm Going To Get Lit Up When The Lights Go up in London", written in 1940 and sung by his first wife, Zoe Gail, in George Black's 1943 production Strike a New Note. It was broadcast in 1944 to alert the Resistance that the invasion of Europe was imminent.

On seeing German V1s flying over London, Gregg composed his best-known song, "Maybe It's Because I'm a Londoner", in 20 minutes while on leave in 1944; it became a hit and London folk anthem in 1947. He also composed numbers for the musicals The Love Racket (1943), Sweet And Low (1944) and Strike It Again (1945).

After the war, he co-starred with Anne Crawford in Western Wind (1949) at the Manchester Opera House, and also directed Agatha Christie stage plays, including The Hollow (1951) and The Mousetrap (for seven years, beginning in 1953). The period was the subject of his 1980 memoir, Agatha Christie and All That Mousetrap. He called Christie "a mean old bitch".

Gregg presented and performed in numerous radio programmes, including A Square Deal for seven years, and Thanks for the Memory for over 30 years. He also acted in films and on television, in addition to writing light comedies and two novels.

== Personal life and death ==
He was married three times: his first wife was the musical comedy star Zoe Gail, whom he married in 1943, with whom he had a daughter, actress-writer Stacey Gregg; the couple divorced in 1950.

In 1956, he married the actress and singer Pat Kirkwood, with whom he starred in Stars in Your Eyes (1956) and the 1958 musical comedy Chrysanthemum. They divorced in 1979.

His third and final marriage was in 1980, to Carmel Lytton, with whom he had a son and a daughter.

Gregg died on 29 March 2004, aged 89, in Eastbourne, East Sussex.

== Complete filmography ==
As actor

- The Marvellous History of St. Bernard (1938 TV film) - Bernard
- Flying Fortress (1942) - Fire Controller (uncredited)
- In Which We Serve (1942) - Pilot
- 29 Acacia Avenue (1945) - Michael
- The Root of All Evil (1947) - Albert
- Vote for Huggett (1949) - Maurice Lever
- Once Upon a Dream (1949) - Capt. Williams
- Landfall (1949) - Lt. Cmdr. Dale
- The Third Visitor (1951) - Jack Kurton
- The Story of Robin Hood and His Merrie Men (1952) - Prince John
- Colonel March of Scotland Yard (1953) - Pennacott
- The Maggie (1954) - Pusey
- Final Appointment (1954) - Hartnell
- Svengali (1954) - Durian
- Room in the House (1955) - Hugh Richards
- Doctor at Sea (1955) - Archer
- Simon and Laura (1955) - Bertie Burton
- Stars in Your Eyes (1956) - Crawley Walters

As writer

- The Great Little Tilley (1956 TV film)
- Stars in Your Eyes (1956)
- Three Men in a Boat (1956)
- After the Ball (1957)

As songwriter

- Strike A New Note (1943) - "I'm Going To Get Lit Up When The Lights Go up in London"
- Meet Mr. Lucifer (1953) - "Maybe It's Because I'm a Londoner" (uncredited)
- As Long as They're Happy (1955) - "I Hate the Morning" (uncredited)
- Doctor at Sea (1955) - "Je Ne Sais Pas"
- Stars in Your Eyes (1956) - "Stars In My Eyes", "I'd Pick Piccadilly", "The Man That Wakes The Man That Blows Reveille"
- Rockets Galore! (1958) - "Maybe It's Because I'm a Londoner" (uncredited)
- Charlie Is My Darling (1966 Rolling Stones documentary) - "Maybe It's Because I'm a Londoner"
- The Adventures of Picasso (1978) - "Maybe It's Because I'm a Londoner"
- Legend (2015) - "Maybe It's Because I'm a Londoner"

As stage play director

- Rule of Three (1963 TV film)
