= Gentleman of Stratford =

1939 novel

- American first edition
- Author: John Brophy
- Language: English
- Genre: Historical
- Publisher: Collins; Harper (US)
- Publication date: 1939
- Publication place: United Kingdom
- Media type: Print

Gentleman of Stratford is a 1939 historical novel by the British writer John Brophy. It is a fictional account of the life of William Shakespeare. Brophy carefully researched the novel to use existing documentary evidence about the playwright. The novel was published in the United States by Harper. It helped launch Brophy's career as a novelist. Author Hugh Walpole described it as "the best biographical novel yet written about Shakespeare".

== Bibliography ==
- Calder, Robert L. Beware the British Serpent: The Role of Writers in British Propaganda in the United States, 1939-1945. McGill-Queen's Press, 2004.
- Franssen, Paul. Shakespeare's Literary Lives: The Author as Character in Fiction and Film. Cambridge University Press, 2016.
- Watson, George & Willison, Ian R. The New Cambridge Bibliography of English Literature, Volume 4. CUP, 1972.
