= A Snitch in Time =

1950 film by Edward Bernds

- Directed by: Edward Bernds
- Written by: Elwood Ullman
- Produced by: Hugh McCollum
- Starring: Moe Howard; Larry Fine; Shemp Howard; Jean Willes; Henry Kulky; John L. Cason; John Merton; Fred F. Sears
- Cinematography: Vincent J. Farrar (uncredited)
- Edited by: Henry DeMond
- Distributed by: Columbia Pictures
- Release date: December 7, 1950 (U.S.)
- Running time: 16:31
- Country: United States
- Language: English

A Snitch in Time is a 1950 short subject directed by Edward Bernds starring American slapstick comedy team The Three Stooges (Moe Howard, Larry Fine and Shemp Howard). It is the 128th entry in the series released by Columbia Pictures starring the comedians, who released 190 shorts for the studio between 1934 and 1959.

== Plot ==
Engaged as carpenters, the trio operates the furniture establishment "Ye Olde Furniture Shoppe: Antiques Made While U Waite." Their current task involves staining furniture delivered to Miss Scudder, the attractive proprietor of a boarding house. Amid their endeavors, which nearly result in the destruction of the furniture, the Stooges encounter new boarders, unbeknownst to them, a trio of criminals fresh from a jewelry heist.

Held at gunpoint, the Stooges witness Miss Scudder being bound and silenced in her kitchen while the felons pilfer her home for valuable heirlooms. Collaborating with Miss Scudder, the Stooges diligently work to foil the criminals' scheme.

== Cast ==
=== Credited ===
- Moe Howard as Moe
- Larry Fine as Larry
- Shemp Howard as Shemp
- Jean Willes as Miss Gladys Scudder

=== Uncredited ===
- Henry Kulky as Steve
- John L. Cason as Louie
- John Merton as Jerry Benton
- Fred F. Sears as Radio announcer (voice)
- Unknown actor as Policeman
- Unknown actor as Policeman

== Production notes ==
A Snitch in Time was filmed December 13–16, 1949, the last Stooge film produced in the 1940s. It has been consistently ranked as the most violent Stooge film of the Shemp era. Unlike the Curly-era equivalent They Stooge to Conga (1943), in which all three Stooges receive their fair share of abuse, most of the violence in A Snitch in Time is directed at Moe. In its opening four minutes, Moe gets his nose and buttocks jammed into the blade of a giant table saw, as well as getting wood glue in his eye and stuck on his hands.

David J. Hogan, author of the 2011 book Three Stooges FAQ, commented that "kids of the day—before bicycle helmets, seat belts, and moratoriums on peanut butter—loved this kind of torment. It's still funny today, but you keep waiting for the spray of blood." Hogan adds that a February 2001 post to the website www.threestooges.net commented that "Only Dawn of the Dead (1978) gives you more pain for your entertainment dollar".

Although Columbia short subject head/director Jules White was known for the usage of excessive violence in his films, A Snitch in Time was directed by Edward Bernds, who always maintained that the violence was not to be excessive in the films he directed.

The title A Snitch in Time parodies the aphorism "a stitch in time saves nine."
