= Adak Island =

Inhabited island in the Aleutian Islands, Alaska, United States

Native name: Adaax
- Location within Alaska

Geography
- Location: Bering Sea
- Coordinates: 51°47′N 176°38′W
- Area: 274.6 sq mi (711 km^{2})
- Area rank: 25th largest island in the United States
- Length: 32.67 mi (52.58 km)
- Width: 21.7 mi (34.9 km)
- Highest elevation: 3,924 ft (1196 m)

Administration
- United States
- Largest settlement: Adak (pop. 171)

Demographics
- Population: 171 (2020)
- Pop. density: 0.24/km^{2} (0.62/sq mi)

Adak Island (Aleut: Adaax, pronounced [ˈaðɑχ]; Russian: Адак) or Father Island, is an island near the western extent of the Andreanof Islands group of the Aleutian Islands in Alaska. Alaska's southernmost city, Adak, is located on the island. The island has a land area of 274.59 square miles (711.18 km^{2}), measuring 33.9 miles (54.5 km) long and 22 miles (35 km) wide, making it the 25th largest island in the United States.

Due to harsh winds, frequent cloud cover, and cold temperatures, vegetation is mostly tundra (grasses, mosses, berries, low-lying flowering plants) at lower elevations. The highest point is Mount Moffett, near the northwest end of the island, at an elevation of 3,924 feet (1,196 m). It is snow covered the greater part of the year. Adak is its largest and principal city.

The word Adak is from the Aleut word adaq, which means "father".

== History ==
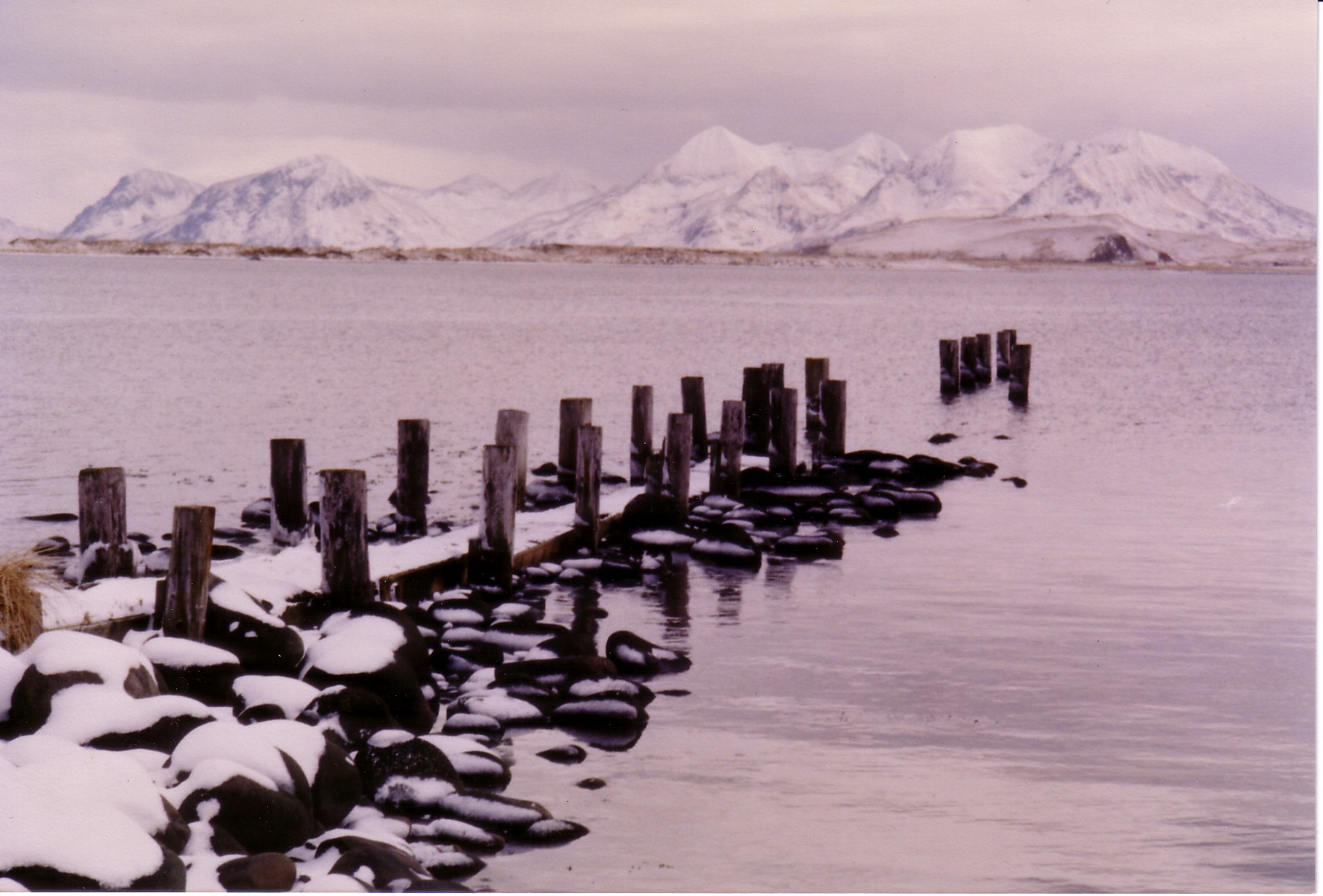
Clam Lagoon

Adak Island has been the home to Aleut peoples since antiquity. Russian explorers in the 18th century also visited the island but made no permanent settlements. During World War II, the Imperial Japanese Army took control of two of the westernmost Aleutian Islands, Attu and Kiska, in the incorporated territory of Alaska, the first foreign enemy to occupy American soil since the War of 1812. The Japanese also attacked the American base at Dutch Harbor by air. The Japanese campaign coincided with the more well-known Battle of Midway. In response, the United States military began a campaign to oust the Japanese. Since the nearest U.S. military presence was in Cold Bay, Alaska, the U.S. began to construct bases in the western Aleutian Islands from which to launch operations against the Japanese. Adak Island was chosen as the site of an airfield, and flight operations began in September 1942. On May 11, 1943, four days after the initial invasion date was delayed by bad weather, American soldiers landed on Attu Island and defeated the Japanese garrison there, at the cost of 2,300 Japanese and 550 American lives. Expecting a similar battle for Kiska Island, U.S. and Allied soldiers landing there August 15, 1943, found the occupiers had been stealthily evacuated by Japanese naval forces since the end of May, 1943. Even so, over 313 Allied soldiers died from friendly fire, mines, and other anti-personnel devices during Allied operations to take back Kiska. In 1953, remains of 236 Japanese dead who had been buried in Adak Cemetery were reburied in Japan's Chidorigafuchi National Cemetery.

After the war was over, some of the approximately 6,000 American military men who served on Adak during World War II recalled Adak's cold, foggy, windy weather; mud; Quonset huts; few women and no trees; and a volcano that from time to time would issue puffs of smoke. Fresh food was a rarity.

Adak Naval Air Station continued to be a military base during the Cold War but was designated a Base Realignment and Closure (BRAC) site in 1995 and closed in March 1997. Shortly thereafter, the town of Adak was incorporated at the site of the former base. Down from a peak population of 6,000, the island recorded a 2020 census population of 171 residents, all in the city of Adak, in the northern part of the island. In 1980, the Aleutian Islands National Wildlife Refuge was created and much of Adak Island lies within its boundaries.

The Alaska Department of Fish and Game introduced approximately 23 caribou calves to the island in the late 1950s, in part to help prevent famine emergencies. Adak Island, with its now large caribou herd of approximately 1,000 animals, according to a 2019 and 2022 count, has become a popular hunting destination.

== Climate ==
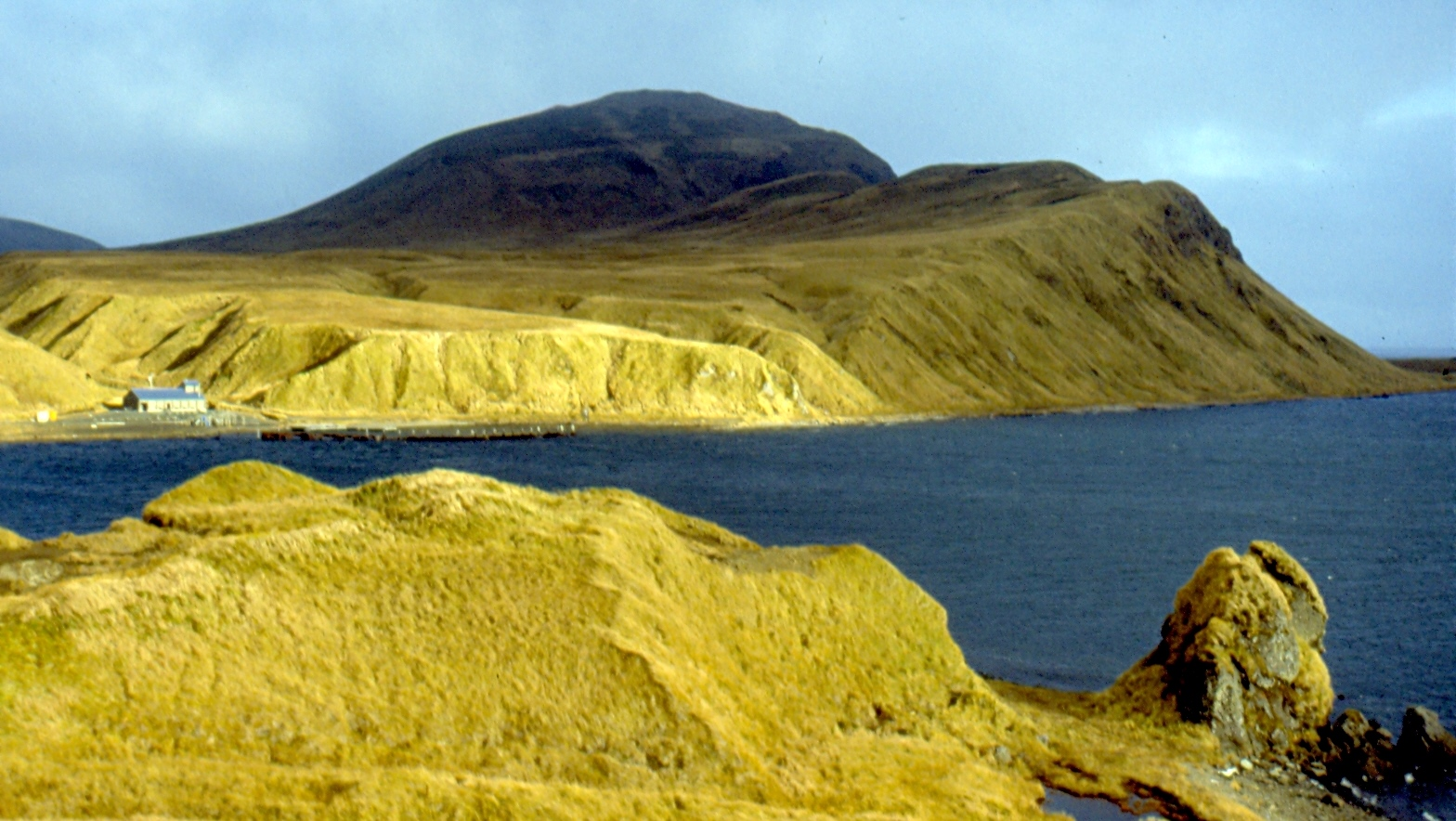
Adak's climate creates a tundra.

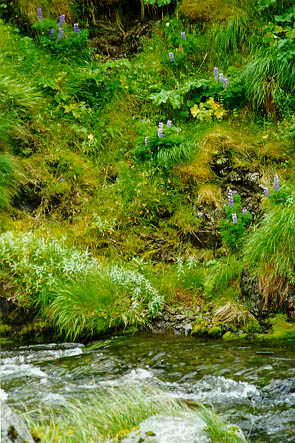
Lupines at Finger Bay Creek

Adak has a subpolar oceanic climate (Koppen Cfc), characterized by persistently overcast skies, moderated temperatures, high winds, significant precipitation and frequent cyclonic storms.

At Adak, overcast conditions average nearly 75 percent of the time during June and July, dropping back to approximately 50 percent of the time from October through February. Adak averages 173 days per year with fog. The foggiest months are July and August, when an average of 26 of the 31 days have fog. This number drops dramatically toward the winter season, where the months of December through March have, on average, fewer than ten days with fog during any one month.

Gales occur in all months of the year at Adak, with the greatest chances being from December through March. A peak gust of 109 knots (202 km/h; 125 mph) occurred at Adak in March 1954.

Adak's average temperatures range from 20 to 60 °F (−7 to 16 °C), with a record high of 75 °F (24 °C) in August 1956 and a record low of 3 °F (−16 °C) in January 1963 and February 1964.

Average annual precipitation is about 54.8 inches (1,390 mm). October to January are the wettest months due to especially frequent and intense mid-latitude cyclonic storms, while May to July represent markedly drier months; thunderstorms, common in mid-latitude continental areas, are virtually unknown here. November is the average wettest month, while July is the average driest month. Average snowfall is 100 inches (2,500 mm), falling primarily on the upper reaches of the volcanoes. Adak has an average of 341 days per year with measurable precipitation.

Climate data for Adak, Alaska (1981–2010 normals, extremes 1942–present)
Month	Jan	Feb	Mar	Apr	May	Jun	Jul	Aug	Sep	Oct	Nov	Dec	Year
Record high °F (°C)	52 (11)	54 (12)	57 (14)	56 (13)	65 (18)	67 (19)	73 (23)	75 (24)	71 (22)	63 (17)	63 (17)	55 (13)	75 (24)
Mean maximum °F (°C)	44.4 (6.9)	45.2 (7.3)	45.8 (7.7)	48.9 (9.4)	52.1 (11.2)	56.8 (13.8)	64.8 (18.2)	67.6 (19.8)	60.6 (15.9)	55.0 (12.8)	49.5 (9.7)	46.5 (8.1)	69.1 (20.6)
Mean daily maximum °F (°C)	37.3 (2.9)	38.0 (3.3)	39.4 (4.1)	42.0 (5.6)	45.8 (7.7)	49.8 (9.9)	54.6 (12.6)	57.2 (14.0)	53.1 (11.7)	48.5 (9.2)	42.8 (6.0)	38.9 (3.8)	45.6 (7.6)
Daily mean °F (°C)	32.7 (0.4)	33.5 (0.8)	35.0 (1.7)	37.6 (3.1)	41.4 (5.2)	45.5 (7.5)	50.0 (10.0)	52.0 (11.1)	48.5 (9.2)	43.7 (6.5)	38.1 (3.4)	34.3 (1.3)	41.0 (5.0)
Mean daily minimum °F (°C)	28.0 (−2.2)	29.0 (−1.7)	30.6 (−0.8)	33.1 (0.6)	37.0 (2.8)	41.2 (5.1)	45.3 (7.4)	46.9 (8.3)	43.9 (6.6)	39.0 (3.9)	33.4 (0.8)	29.6 (−1.3)	36.4 (2.4)
Mean minimum °F (°C)	12.9 (−10.6)	17.4 (−8.1)	19.9 (−6.7)	25.8 (−3.4)	30.8 (−0.7)	35.8 (2.1)	40.2 (4.6)	40.0 (4.4)	34.2 (1.2)	29.8 (−1.2)	24.9 (−3.9)	18.1 (−7.7)	10.6 (−11.9)
Record low °F (°C)	3 (−16)	3 (−16)	11 (−12)	20 (−7)	20 (−7)	29 (−2)	33 (1)	33 (1)	28 (−2)	22 (−6)	12 (−11)	8 (−13)	3 (−16)
Average precipitation inches (mm)	6.09 (155)	4.05 (103)	4.98 (126)	3.14 (80)	2.87 (73)	2.79 (71)	2.63 (67)	4.22 (107)	5.48 (139)	6.19 (157)	6.30 (160)	5.96 (151)	54.70 (1,389)
Average snowfall inches (cm)	24.8 (63)	17.3 (44)	19.3 (49)	7.7 (20)	1.3 (3.3)	0.0 (0.0)	0.0 (0.0)	0.0 (0.0)	trace	0.6 (1.5)	10.8 (27)	20.6 (52)	102.4 (260)
Average precipitation days (≥ 0.01 inch)	25.7	22.3	25.4	21.6	22.3	16.4	15.5	19.4	21.6	24.9	24.4	26.8	266.3
Average snowy days (≥ 0.1 in)	18.2	15.4	16.4	11.6	2.6	0.0	0.0	0.0	0.1	1.0	10.0	15.9	91.2
Source 1: NOAA
Source 2: XMACIS2 (mean maxima/minima 1981–2010), WRCC (extremes)

== Economy ==
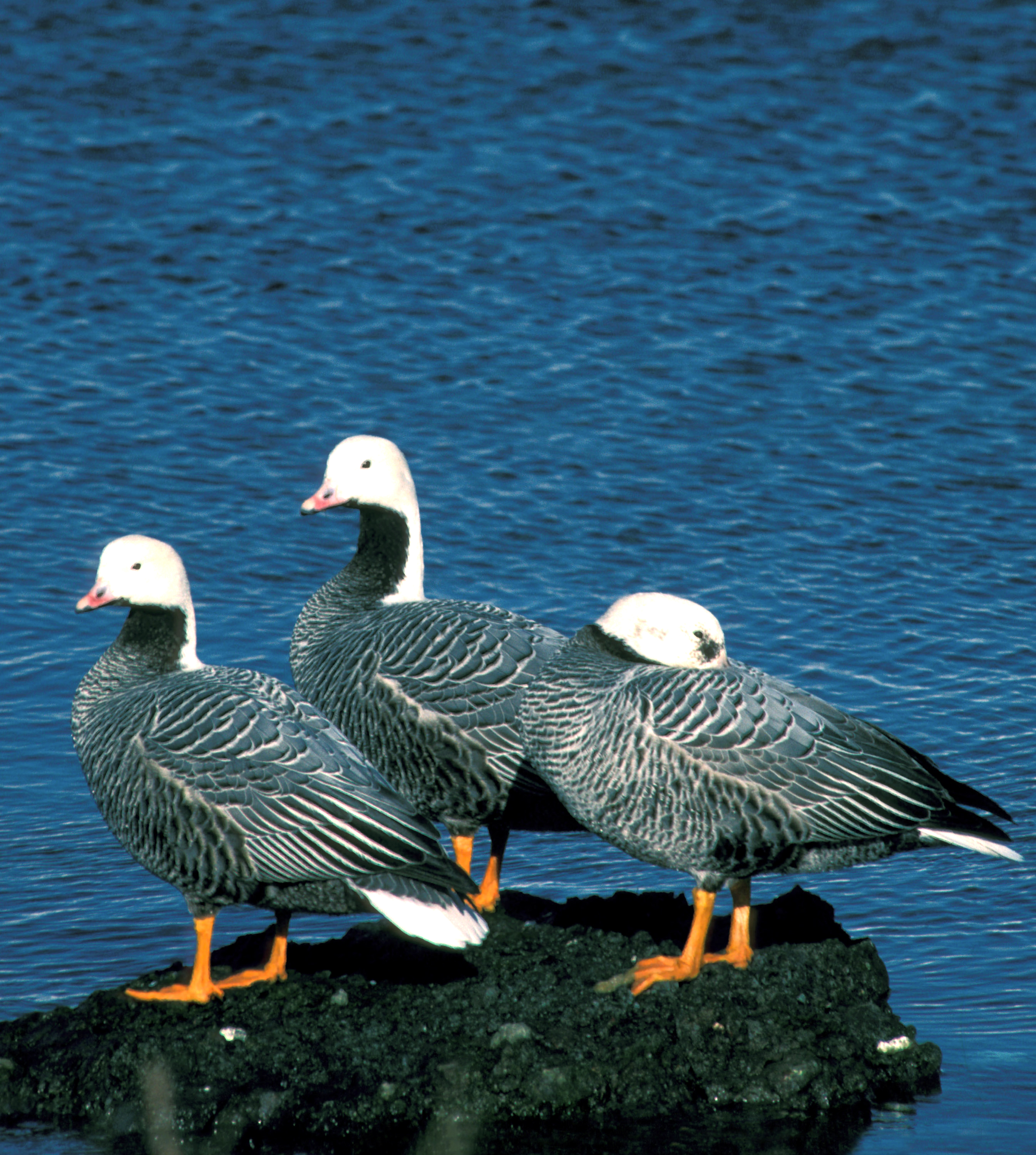
Emperor geese at Adak Island Clam Lagoon

A land exchange between Alaska Native Regional Corporations, the U.S. Navy, and the Department of the Interior has transferred most of the naval facilities to the Aleut Corp. A portion of the Island will remain within the National Maritime National Wildlife Refuge, managed by U.S. Fish and Wildlife. Adak currently provides a fueling port and crew transfer facility for foreign fishing fleets—an airport, docks, housing facilities and food services are available. A grocery and ship supply store and restaurant opened in February 1999. Aleut Corporation maintains the facilities. Contractors are performing an environmental clean-up. Alaskan-owned Norquest-Adak Seafood Co. processes Pacific cod, pollock, mackerel, halibut, albacore and brown king crab. Four residents hold a commercial fishing permit, primarily for groundfish.

== Transportation ==
Because of its naval aviation past, Adak has an unusually large and sophisticated airport for the Aleutian Islands. The Adak Airport is operated by the State of Alaska Department of Transportation. Adak Airport has a control tower, an Instrument Landing System and two runways: 7,790 ft (2,370 m) and 7,605 ft (2,318 m). Both runways are asphalt paved, 200 ft (61 m) wide and at an elevation of 19 ft (6 m).

Alaska Airlines operates twice-weekly Boeing 737-800 passenger and cargo jet service from Anchorage. At present, flights operate each Wednesday and Saturday (weather permitting). Occasionally, extra seasonal flights are operated to meet the demand of the fishing season. Adak Airport was historically served for many years by Reeve Aleutian Airways (RAA), with scheduled passenger flights to Anchorage operated with Lockheed L-188 Electra turboprop combi aircraft during the 1970s, followed by Boeing 727-100 jet combi aircraft during the 1980s and 1990s.

Other facilities in Adak include three deep water docks and fueling facilities. The city has requested funds to greatly expand the Sweeper Cove small boat harbor, including new breakwaters, a 315-foot (96 m) dock and new moorage floats

There are approximately 16 miles (26 km) of paved and primitive roads on Adak, all privately owned by the Aleut Corporation.

== Flora ==
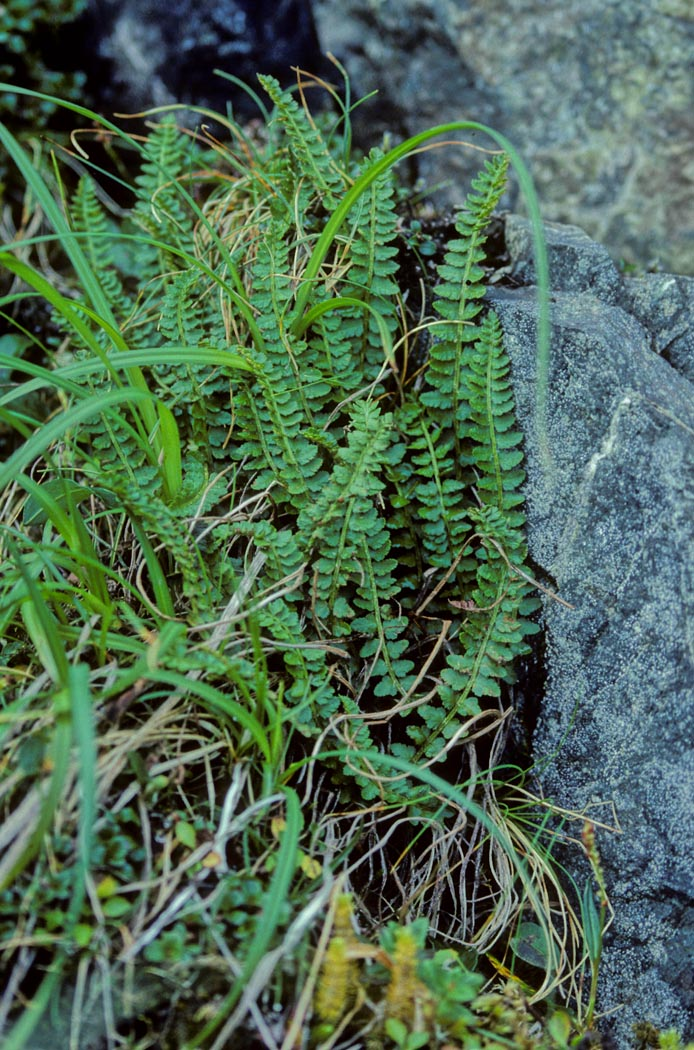
Aleutian shield fern

The Aleutian shield fern is an endangered species found only on this island.

Adak National Forest is a small copse on the island jokingly referred to as a national forest.

== Geology ==
Adagdak and Mount Moffett volcanoes are located on Adak. The igneous rock type adakite is named after Adak.

== See also ==
- Report from the Aleutians, a 1943 documentary about World War II that was filmed on Adak
- Kuluk Bay
