= Waterfront (novel) =

1934 novel

- Author: John Brophy
- Language: English
- Genre: Crime drama
- Publisher: Jonathan Cape
- Publication date: 1934
- Publication place: United Kingdom
- Media type: Print

Waterfront is a 1934 crime drama novel by the British writer John Brophy. It is set in his native Liverpool amongst the world of dockworkers.

== Film adaptation ==
In 1950 it was adapted into a British film of the same title directed by Michael Anderson and starring Robert Newton, Richard Burton and Susan Shaw.

== Bibliography ==
- Crowley, Tony. Scouse: A Social and Cultural History. Liverpool University Press, 2012.
- Goble, Alan. The Complete Index to Literary Sources in Film. Walter de Gruyter, 1999.
- Watson, George & Willison, Ian R. The New Cambridge Bibliography of English Literature, Volume 4. CUP, 1972.
