= Report from the Aleutians =

1943 film documentary directed by John Huston

- Directed by: John Huston
- Written by: John Huston (uncredited)
- Produced by: John Huston
- Starring: John Huston; Walter Huston; Milton Ashkin
- Narrated by: John Huston; Walter Huston
- Cinematography: Jules Buck
- Edited by: John Huston (uncredited)
- Music by: Dimitri Tiomkin (uncredited)
- Production company: Army Pictorial Service
- Distributed by: War Activities Committee of the Motion Pictures Industry
- Release date: July 30, 1943
- Running time: 47 minutes
- Country: United States
- Language: English

Report from the Aleutians is a 1943 documentary propaganda film produced by the U.S. Army Signal Corps about the Aleutian Islands Campaign during World War II. It was directed and narrated by John Huston and was nominated for Best Documentary at the 16th Academy Awards.

== Plot ==
In contrast to the other technicolor films made in the Pacific war, Report from the Aleutians has relatively little combat footage, and instead concentrates on the daily lives of the servicemen on Adak Island, as they live and work there while flying missions over nearby Kiska. The film opens with a map showing the strategic importance of the island, and the thrust of the 1942 Japanese offensive into Midway and Dutch Harbor. Photographs of the pilots who beat the Japanese back at Dutch Harbor are passed before the camera. "There is no monument to these men. If you want to see their monument, look around you."

The American forces dug in at Adak Island, and there commenced daily bombing missions over the Japanese who had taken Kiska. The film focuses on their routine activities such as harbor patrols, messes, news boards and mail call. "Ask any pilot. He'd tell you he'd gladly fly an extra trip over Kiska to get just one letter." One pilot's crash landing is shown, and his funeral is filmed.

The last twenty minutes or so of the film is taken from footage taken over a mission over Japanese positions. The monotony of the one-hour trip there is emphasized, noting that some have taken up "mental solitaire" on the way over. But at Kiska there is no lack of excitement, as several loads of bombs are dropped over the Japanese, and fire is exchanged by the tailgunner. At the end of the film the servicemen at Adak are shown rejoicing that all of their comrades have returned.

Huston included shots showing the monotony of Army life, e.g. latrine digging and cigarette smoking, and Army authorities objected to the inclusion of these scenes. However, Huston fought for the inclusion of these scenes and eventually prevailed, although after a delay of a couple of months.

== Cast ==
- Milton Ashkin Milton as Self – USAAF Fighter Pilot (as Maj. Milton Ashkin)
- Lyle A. Bean as Self – USAAF Fighter Pilot (as Lt. Lyle A. Bean)
- Jack Chennault as Self – USAAF Fighter Pilot (as Col. Jack Chennault)
- C.M. McCorkle as Self – USAAF Commander (as Col. C.M. McCorkle)
- Hawley P. Mills as Self – USAAF Fighter Pilot (as Lt. Hawley P. Mills)
- William Prince as Self – USAAF Commander (as Col. William Prince)
- George I. Radell as Self – USAAF Fighter Pilot (as Lt. George I. Radell)
- Henry J. Strenkowski as Self – USAAF Fighter Pilot (as Lt. Henry J. Strenkowski)
