= Don't Throw That Knife =

1951 film by Jules White

- Directed by: Jules White
- Written by: Felix Adler
- Produced by: Jules White
- Starring: Moe Howard; Larry Fine; Shemp Howard; Dick Curtis; Jean Willes
- Cinematography: Fayte M. Browne
- Edited by: Edwin H. Bryant
- Distributed by: Columbia Pictures
- Release date: May 3, 1951 (U.S.)
- Running time: 15:50
- Country: United States
- Language: English

Don't Throw That Knife is a 1951 short subject directed by Jules White starring American slapstick comedy team The Three Stooges (Moe Howard, Larry Fine and Shemp Howard). It is the 131st entry in the series released by Columbia Pictures starring the comedians, who released 190 shorts for the studio between 1934 and 1959.

== Plot ==
While conducting a census in an apartment complex, the Stooges encounter Mrs. Lucy Wyckoff, a member of a husband-and-wife Magician Troupe. They soon discover that Mrs. Wyckoff's husband, Mr. Wyckoff, is not only her performance partner but also harbors an intense jealousy, manifesting in a propensity for lethal knife-throwing against perceived romantic rivals.

Upon Mr. Wyckoff's return home, the Stooges attempt unsuccessfully to evade his menacing presence. Faced with imminent danger, they hastily retreat and alert the authorities regarding Mr. Wyckoff's threatening behavior.

== Cast ==
- Shemp Howard as Shemp
- Larry Fine as Larry
- Moe Howard as Moe
- Jean Willes as Lucy Wycoff
- Dick Curtis as Mr. Wycoff

== Production notes ==
"Don't Throw That Knife" was filmed on June 20–22, 1950. The film title is officially listed with quotation marks around it (as in "Don't Throw That Knife").

Author Michael Fleming observed that Don't Throw That Knife marked the first significantly subpar entry in the series directed by Jules White. White had been alternating directorial duties with Edward Bernds whose contributions displayed a discernible polish that White's work was starting to lack. By the following year, a power struggle erupted at Columbia Pictures, leading to the departure of both Bernds and producer Hugh McCollum. Consequently, White became the sole director of the Stooges' films from late 1952 until 1957, when the trio's contract with the studio expired.
