= The Day They Robbed the Bank of England =

1960 British film by John Guillermin

- Poster
- Directed by: John Guillermin
- Screenplay by: Howard Clewes; Richard Maibaum
- Based on: The Day They Robbed the Bank of England; 1959 novel by John Brophy
- Produced by: Jules Buck
- Starring: Aldo Ray; Elizabeth Sellars; Peter O'Toole; Hugh Griffith; Kieron Moore; Albert Sharpe
- Cinematography: Georges Périnal
- Edited by: Frank Clarke
- Music by: Edwin Astley
- Production company: Summit Film
- Distributed by: Metro-Goldwyn Mayer
- Release date: 17 May 1960
- Running time: 85 minutes
- Country: United Kingdom
- Language: English
- Budget: $457,000
- Box office: $805,000

The Day They Robbed the Bank of England is a 1960 British crime film directed by John Guillermin and starring Aldo Ray, Elizabeth Sellars and Peter O'Toole. It was written by Howard Clewes and Richard Maibaum and based upon the 1959 novel of the same title by John Brophy.

Peter O'Toole's role in the film led him to be cast as the lead in Lawrence of Arabia, released two years later.

== Plot ==
In London in 1901, during Ireland's struggle for independence, Charles Norgate, an Irish American, is recruited by Irish revolutionaries to rob the Bank of England. Iris Muldoon, widow of an Irish independence martyr, enlists Norgate for the heist. Led by O'Shea, the group plans to steal one million pounds in gold bullion as a political statement. Initially mistrusted, Norgate earns their confidence by revealing his Irish roots.

Norgate befriends Lieutenant Monte Fitch of the Guards and gains access to the bank's architectural plans by breaking into the bank's museum. Despite scepticism from Walsh, another revolutionary who, like Norgate, is infatuated with Muldoon, Norgate uncovers an underground sewer running beneath the bank vaults. Posing as an archaeologist, he convinces a tosher to help him locate the sealed sewer entrance. The revolutionaries begin tunneling toward the bank vaults, planning the heist for a long weekend in August, when the bank will be closed.

Lt. Fitch grows suspicious of Norgate and begins investigating. During the dig, the revolutionaries puncture a gas pipe, alerting the guards when the gas lights in the bank suddenly grow dim. However, with one keyholder on holiday, the vault cannot be immediately inspected. Meanwhile, O'Shea announces that the Irish Home Rule Bill has been reintroduced in Parliament, and the heist must be halted to avoid jeopardising its passage. Muldoon convinces Walsh to help her inform Norgate, but when he discovers that Norgate has already broken through to the vault, Walsh chooses to remain silent and joins in stealing the gold.

The revolutionaries manage to take a million pounds' worth of gold through the tunnel. Muldoon has sent away their escape boat, but despite her pleas, Norgate and Walsh load the gold onto a horse-drawn cart. Realising the tosher has not emerged from the sewers, Norgate returns to find him. The tosher, who had been overcome by gas, revives, and climbs the ladder into the bank vault by mistake. Norgate follows him. The overloaded cart collapses in the street, catching the attention of a passing policeman. Norgate and Walsh are arrested and led away in handcuffs, with Muldoon tearfully watching. The tosher, carrying a statue fragment from the tunnel that appears to be a Roman relic, walks away.

== Cast ==
- Aldo Ray as Charles Norgate
- Elizabeth Sellars as Iris Muldoon
- Peter O'Toole as Lieutenant Monte Fitch
- Kieron Moore as Walsh
- Albert Sharpe as Tosher
- Joseph Tomelty as Cohoun
- Wolf Frees as Dr. Hagen
- John Le Mesurier as Green
- Miles Malleson as Assistant Curator
- Colin Gordon as Keeper
- Andrew Keir as Sergeant
- Hugh Griffith as O'Shea
- Michael Brennan as Walters
- Arthur Lowe as Clerk

== Production ==
Filming started in London in September 1959. The cast included Peter O'Toole, then heavily in demand after his stage success on The Long and the Short and the Tall. O'Toole later said when offered the role "it wasn't the part I was offered that interested me but the Guards Officer who is reluctantly forced to think." He and producer Jules Buck formed their own production company in January 1960.

== Reception ==
=== Box office ===
According to MGM records, the film earned $180,000 in the US and Canada and $625,000 elsewhere, resulting in a loss of $57,000.

=== Critical ===
The Monthly Film Bulletin wrote: "The film is a small-scale one and knows it: events are not unduly drawn out, footage is not padded, the total impression is of a concise, efficient piece of story-telling from scriptwriters who know their job and a director who is able to give the subject the right qualities of verve and lightness. Peter O'Toole, as the obtuse but sympathetic guardee, plays with predictable distinction, his performance being perhaps the closest the film comes to a character study. For the most part, the story here counts for more than the people: and the story happens to be a good one."

The Radio Times Guide to Films gave the film 3/5 stars, writing: "Both a heist thriller and a sophisticated political drama, this was directed by John Guillermin, who makes the most of the planning and features some clever use of locations, but most eyes will be on Peter O'Toole as the young security guard Fitch."

FilmInk said "There's two spectacular performances: one from Albert Sharpe as a tunnel digger and the other from Peter O'Toole, full of youth and life as an idiotic upper class twit who gives Ray all this inside information, then begins to twig that he's accidentally assisted a crime."
