= Turn the Key Softly =

1953 British film

- Directed by: Jack Lee
- Written by: Jack Lee; Maurice Cowan
- Based on: Turn the Key Softly by John Brophy
- Produced by: Maurice Cowan; Earl St. John
- Starring: Yvonne Mitchell; Joan Collins; Kathleen Harrison; Terence Morgan
- Cinematography: Geoffrey Unsworth
- Edited by: Lito Carruthers
- Music by: Mischa Spoliansky
- Production company: Chiltern Productions
- Distributed by: General Film Distributors
- Release date: 19 April 1953
- Running time: 81 minutes
- Country: United Kingdom
- Language: English

Turn the Key Softly is a 1953 British drama film directed by Jack Lee and starring Yvonne Mitchell, Joan Collins, Kathleen Harrison, and Terence Morgan. Lee and producer Maurice Cowan wrote the screenplay, based on the 1951 novel of the same title by John Brophy, dealing with the first 24 hours of freedom for three women released on probation from prison on the same morning. It was shot at Pinewood Studios and on location around London. The film's sets were designed by the art director Donald M. Ashton. It was released by Rank's General Film Distributors.

== Plot ==
Three women are released from Holloway Prison in London. Monica Marsden is a well-bred young woman, led into crime by her smooth-talking lover David; Monica took the fall for a crime he masterminded. Stella Jarvis is a beautiful West End prostitute. Mrs Quilliam is a kindly elderly widow, who lived in poverty and was jailed for repeat shoplifting offences. Monica proposes that the three should meet up later for a fancy dinner, for which she will pay, to discuss how their first day of freedom has gone.

Monica goes to stay at her friend's flat and spends her morning job-hunting. Obtaining an office job despite her criminal record, she returns to the apartment and finds David waiting for her there. Although she is initially angry that he did not contact her once during her incarceration, he convinces her that the two of them can make a fresh start now that he is gainfully employed as a car salesman. He invites her to the theatre later that night.

Stella is engaged to Bob, an honest bus conductor who has patiently waited for her to get out of prison so they can marry. She resolves to change her ways and make him a good wife. He tells her that they can marry the following week when he can take time off from his work. He gives her three pounds to rent a room in Canonbury (since his landlady will not let Stella stay with him) and to buy herself food. He tells her to meet him that evening after his shift ends. She takes the bus to rent the room, but her route takes her through Leicester Square, where she visits her prostitute friends and squanders the three pounds on a pair of earrings.

Mrs Quilliam returns to her former room in the poor neighbourhood of Shepherd's Bush to her special friend, Johnny. Johnny turns out to be her beloved little dog, a Wire Fox Terrier, whom her neighbours have looked after. Mrs Quilliam has very little money. She and Johnny go to visit her daughter, Lila, who now lives in a nice suburban home with her husband and daughter. Lila, embarrassed by her mother's poverty and criminal record, is not happy to see her and coldly sends her away.

The three women, along with Johnny, dine at the Monte Christi, an elegant restaurant. Afterwards, Stella allows a businessman, George Jenkins, to pick her up on the street. (Jenkins had earlier propositioned Monica but she brushed him off.) They go drinking together, he gets drunk and Stella realises she is going to be late meeting Bob. Just before George falls asleep against a building, he tells Stella he does not like her new earrings and offers her money to buy a "decent" pair. She takes three pounds, returns George's wallet, then puts her earrings in his pocket, and hurries to meet Bob at Piccadilly Circus. She tells Bob she did not go to Canonbury, but that she has not done anything bad, showing him that she still has the three pounds. The two happily leave together.

Mrs Quilliam stops at a pub, where Johnny accidentally escapes out of the door into an unfamiliar area. She frantically hunts for Johnny, and upon seeing him, rushes into the street without looking. She is struck by a car and killed.

Monica goes to the theatre with David, only to learn that he plans to rob a safe in a building over the road and wants her to help him, after which they will flee the country with the stolen money. She does not want to be involved, but he forces her onto the roof and locks the door, making her wait for him while he climbs down a rope ladder and enters a nearby window to rob the safe. While she is waiting, she manages to find the key, unlock the door and slip back into the theatre, leaving David to be discovered by security and apprehended by police. Monica is sadly walking home when she sees the dead Mrs Quilliam being stretchered into an ambulance and learns what happened. She then sees Johnny whimpering nearby, and takes him home to start their new life together.

== Cast ==
- Yvonne Mitchell as Monica Marsden
- Terence Morgan as David
- Joan Collins as Stella Jarvis
- Kathleen Harrison as Mrs Quilliam
- Thora Hird as Mrs Rowan
- Dorothy Alison as Joan
- Glyn Houston as Bob
- Geoffrey Keen as Mr Gregory
- Russell Waters as George Jenkins
- Clive Morton as Walters
- Richard Massingham as bystander
- Hilda Fenemore as Mrs Quilliam's daughter
- Fred Griffiths as newspaper seller
- Simone Silva as Marie
- Toke Townley as Prison Officer
- Vi Stevens as barmaid
- Edward Evans as commissionaire

== Production ==
The film was based on a novel published in 1952. The censor, Arthur Watkyn, a playwright, made some suggestions for cuts to enable the film to be passed. Reportedly, Kathleen Harrison had to spend two hours in the make up chair every morning.

This was Joan Collins's first film under a new contract she had signed with Rank. Terence Morgan was also under contract to Rank.

== Reception ==
The Monthly Film Bulletin wrote: "Once again a promising subject is wasted by, unfortunately, the dreary and familiar formulas too common in British films: crudely contrived plot, erratic backgrounds ... novelettish dialogue, and unequal characterisation. Jack Lee's direction makes a sincere effort to 'place' his people and give one a wide variety of London locations, but is defeated by the script (on which he collaborated), which packs a whole series of unlikely coincidences into the 24-hour framework."

Kine Weekly wrote: "The picture plaits its three complementary stories tightly and the heartwarming, amusing and fense strands make morally sound, as well as engrossing, entertainment."

Picturegoer wrote: "This modest British melodrama makes no great claims for itself, but it rattles along with all the self-confidence of a driver's making speed on a familiar bypass. It is made with two eyes on the popular box office and none on critical acclaim, and it isn't ashamed to parade well-tried favourites in situation and character. Perhaps it would have had a bit more of both worlds if it had deliberately tried to be a little more original."

Variety said "there is an interesting idea in this new British production which just fails to come off."

New York Times critic A. W. wrote: "Turn the Key Softly ... is pointedly realistic about its stigmatized principals. And, while this examination of the short courses of the lives of three ladies of varying degree after they have left London's Holloway Prison, is not precisely on a heroic scale, the producers have endowed the proceedings with compassion, sensitivity and a modicum of irony. Credit Jack Lee and Maurice Cowan, ... with keeping their heroines on the move without snarling this traffic in tales. (They) see the ladies through with honest results. Yvonne Mitchell ... brings attractiveness and understanding to the role. Joan Collins is properly lush and brassy as the Cockney charmer. However, Kathleen Harrison ... contributes the film's top portrayal. She makes the loneliness of the poor and unwanted strikingly real."

Film critic of the Pittsburgh Press Henry Ward said: "Turn the Key Softly is the kind of movie that apparently can only be made in Britain. It is a warm, sympathetic sort of movie that is sentimental without being sticky or maudlin, a well-paced melodrama that never falls back on over-dramatics for effect." He described Mitchell as "appealing", Collins as "excellent" and Harrison as "superb", concluding that the film "came to our town with a minimum of fanfare. It doesn't need it. It has a good story told with fine acting."
