= Decameron Nights =

1953 British-American film by Hugo Fregonese

- Directed by: Hugo Fregonese
- Written by: George Oppenheimer; Geza Herczeg (treatment)
- Based on: Summary of Decameron tales 1353 novel by Giovanni Boccaccio
- Produced by: M. J. Frankovich
- Starring: Joan Fontaine; Louis Jourdan
- Cinematography: Guy Green
- Edited by: Russell Lloyd
- Music by: Antony Hopkins
- Production companies: Amerit Film Corp. Film Locations, Ltd.
- Distributed by: Eros Films (UK); RKO Radio Pictures (US)
- Release dates: 13 January 1953 (UK); 16 November 1953 (U.S.)
- Running time: 94 minutes
- Countries: United Kingdom; United States
- Language: English
- Budget: £94,552

Decameron Nights (also known as Tres Historias De Amor) is a 1953 British-American anthology Technicolor film directed by Hugo Fregonese and starring Joan Fontaine and Louis Jourdan. It was written by George Oppenheimer based on three tales from The Decameron by Giovanni Boccaccio, specifically the ninth and tenth tales of the second day and the ninth tale of the third.

== Plot ==
In the mid-fourteenth century, Boccaccio seeks his true love, the recently widowed Fiametta, and finds that she has fled Florence, plague-ridden and being sacked by an invading army, for a villa in the countryside with several female companions. When he shows up, Fiametta does not want to invite him to stay, but her friends, bored and lacking male companionship, override her. To entertain the ladies (and further his courtship of Fiametta), Boccaccio tells stories of the pursuit of love.

Bartolomea is frustrated by her marriage to the wealthy, much older Ricciardo. The latter's strong belief in astrology dictates how they live. One day, the stars are favorable for fishing, but pirates capture the ladies. Their captain, Paganino, releases all but Bartolomea. He demand a 50,000 gold florin ransom to be paid at Majorca. By the time Ricciardo shows up, however, Bartolomea has fallen in love with the pirate. She denies knowing Ricciardo and, when he is unable to answer a simple question about her, Paganino's friend, the Governor of Majorca, orders Ricciardo to pay a fine for his lies: 50,000 florins. Paganino and Bartolomea get married, and he promises to give up piracy.

Fiametta is not amused by the "moral" of the story, but the others beg Boccaccio for another. Instead, Fiametta decides to recount a more uplifting tale, to her friends' disappointment.

Giulio goads Bernabo into betting on the virtue of his wife Ginevra. Giulio wagers that he can seduce Ginevra within a month. However, Giulio merely bribes the woman's maid Nerina into letting him hide in her mistress's bedchamber. Later, while Ginevra sleeps, he steals her locket and cuts off a lock of her hair, noticing as he does so a birthmark on her shoulder. When Giulio provides all three as "proof", Bernabo pays up. He then recruits two assassins to do away with his wife. The killers are discomfited by Ginevra's lack of fear and let her go.

She disguises herself as a man and becomes a sailor on a merchant ship. A potential customer, the Sultan, becomes fascinated by Ginevra's pet talking parrot and agrees to buy the merchant's wares if he can also have the bird. Since the parrot will only speak for Ginevra, she agrees to enter the Sultan's service.

Then one day, she spots her locket in a marketplace stall manned by Giulio. Still in disguise, she coaxes the story out of him and finally learns why her husband wanted her dead. She has the Sultan invite both Giulio and Bernabo to dinner. Later, with Bernabo within earshot but out of sight, she appears dressed as a woman and asks Giulio if he knows her. When he repeatedly denies it, she is vindicated, and reunited with her husband.

Boccaccio does not like the tale, and starts another.

Spanish Don Bertrando is sent to fetch a female doctor, Isabella, for his master, the seriously ill King. On the trip, he defends her from two highwaymen.

When she cures the King, he offers her anything. She asks for a husband: Bertrando. Dismayed, Bertrando agrees, but immediately after their wedding, he leaves her - having fulfilled his promise – and resumes his playboy ways. Before departing, he tells her that he will only live with her if she obtains the ring on his finger and bears him a child.

Learning that Bertrando is trying to seduce an innkeeper's daughter, Maria, Isabella has the innkeeper send Bertrando a message supposedly from Maria agreeing to spend the night with him. Instead, Isabella keeps the rendezvous in the dark, unlit bedroom. She later steals Bertrando's ring while he is sleeping and leaves before her deception is revealed. Months later, she gives birth to a son. Bertrando shows up, having heard that she claims the child is his. After she tells her story, Bertrando embraces her.

When Fiametta is again critical of Boccaccio's story, he gives up and leaves. However, he returns, takes Fiametta in his arms, and kisses her. She resists at first, then gives in.

== Cast ==
- Joan Fontaine as Fiametta / Bartolomea / Ginevra / Isabella
- Louis Jourdan as Giovanni Boccaccio / Paganino / Giulio / Don Bertrando
- Godfrey Tearle as Ricciardo / Bernabo
- Joan Collins as Pampinea / Maria
- Binnie Barnes as Contessa de Firenze / The Countess / Nerina the Chambermaid / The Old Witch
- Meinhart Maur as sultan
- Gordon Whiting
- Gordon Bell as merchant
- Melissa Stribling as girl in villa
- Stella Riley as girl in villa
- Mara Lane as girl in villa
- Van Boolen as captain
- Gérard Tichy
- Diaz de Mendoza
- Carlos Villarías (as Carolos Villarias)
- Eliot Makeham as Governor of Majorca
- Marjorie Rhodes as Signora Bucca
- Noel Purcell as Father Francisco
- Hugh Morton as King
- George Bernard as messenger
- Bert Bernard as messenger

== Reception ==
The Monthly Film Bulletin wrote: "Made by an Argentine born Hollywood director and an Anglo-American cast, and filmed on location in Spain and at Elstree Studios, this is the sort of hybrid international production of which experience has made one slightly mistrustful. The idea of filming Boccaccio is strange enough, but the film, with an essentially twentieth-century script, takes on something of the air of a series of revue sketches; the Bernard brothers provide a pantomime act as a pair of soft-hearted executioners, Binnie Barnes comes on a in variety of strange disguises, and the two stars, scarcely disguised at all, perform with a dispiriting tattiness. Dialogue and direction are heavy-handed though good natured colour is rather garish. An odd, rather tiring charade."
