= Avis Scott =

British actress (1918–2010)

Avis Scott on the cover of Everybody's Weekly, 29 May 1954

Avis Scott (22 February 1918 – 31 May 2010) was a British film and theatre actress. She was born in London as Avis F Scutt, daughter of Arthur Octavius Scutt and Freda May Palmer. She emigrated to the US in 1957 and married Jack W Matthias in Los Angeles in 1980. She died in Fort Collins, Colorado aged 92. Scott was a BBC continuity announcer during the early 1950s but was fired for apparently being "too sexy" for British television.

== Filmography ==
Year	Title	Role	Notes
1939	The Missing People		Uncredited
1943	Millions Like Us	Alice	Uncredited
1945	Brief Encounter	Kardomah Waitress	Uncredited
1946	Pool of Contentment	Secretary	
1947	Master of Bankdam	Mary Crowther	
1947	Fame is The Spur	Pen	
1950	Waterfront	Nora McCabe	
1951	To Have and to Hold	June	
1951	Emergency Call	Marie	
1952	It Started in Paradise	Journalist	Uncredited
1952	Potter of The Yard		
1954	Five Days	Eileen	Uncredited
1954	Case Of Express Delivery	Evie	Short, derived from Stryker of the Yard
1954	Case of the Burnt Alibi		Stryker of the Yard
1955	Storm Over the Nile	Sergeant's Wife	
