= To Have and to Hold (1951 film) =

1951 British 'B' film by Godfrey Grayson

- Directed by: Godfrey Grayson
- Screenplay by: Reginald Long
- Based on: To Have and to Hold (play) by Lionel Brown
- Produced by: Anthony Hinds
- Starring: Avis Scott; Patrick Barr; Robert Ayres; Eunice Gayson
- Cinematography: Walter J. Harvey
- Edited by: James Needs
- Music by: Frank Spencer; Reginald Long
- Production company: Hammer Films
- Distributed by: Exclusive Films (UK)
- Release date: 14 February 1951
- Running time: 63 minutes
- Country: United Kingdom
- Language: English

To Have and to Hold is a 1951 British second feature ('B') romantic drama film directed by Godfrey Grayson and starring Avis Scott, Patrick Barr and Robert Ayres. It was one of the few "soap opera"-type films Hammer produced, and did not fare well at the box office. Production began on 26 June 1950, shot back-to-back with Hammer's next film The Dark Light. The screenplay was by Reginald Long based on the play by Lionel Browne. Long co-wrote the film's theme song "Midsummer Day" with music director Frank Spencer.

== Plot ==
Following a riding accident, country gentleman Brian Harding is crippled and facing imminent death. His final days are spent arranging the future security of his wife and daughter. This extends to encouraging his wife to develop one of her male friendships into a romantic relationship.

== Cast ==
- Avis Scott as June Harding
- Patrick Barr as Brian Harding
- Robert Ayres as Max
- Harry Fine as Robert
- Ellen Pollock as Roberta
- Richard Warner as Cyril
- Eunice Gayson as Peggy Harding
- Peter Neil as Dr. Pritchard

== Critical reception ==
The Monthly Film Bulletin wrote: "Apart from a tactful performance from Patrick Barr as the cripple, and some pleasant country house backgrounds, the situation is strained for all concerned."

Picturegoer wrote: "TV stars Patrick Barr and Robert Ayres come over well in the male leads of the paralytic and his cousin. Avis Scott does well as the wife, and her brother and sister are capably portrayed by Harry Fine and Ellen Pollock. One of the better British second features."

Picture Show wrote: "It is well acted."

The Radio Times noted "A non-starry but well-played little drama, claustrophobic, certainly not uninteresting, but not quite good enough."

Britmovie called it a "Stiff upper lip romantic melodrama, not quite so bad as it sounds."

In British Sound Films: The Studio Years 1928–1959 David Quinlan rated the film as "average", writing: "Odd, strained little drama, almost redeemed by the acting."
