= Jules Buck =

American film producer (1917–2001)

Jules Buck (July 30, 1917 – July 19, 2001) was an American film producer.

== Career ==
He was a cameraman for John Huston's war documentaries and began producing as assistant to Mark Hellinger.

In 1957, Buck moved to London, where he met Peter O'Toole and launched the production company Keep Films with him. The company produced or co-produced several films starring O'Toole, including Becket, The Lion in Winter, What's New Pussycat?, Under Milk Wood and The Ruling Class.

== Personal life ==
Buck was born in St Louis, Missouri, on July 30, 1917. From his 1945 marriage to actress Joyce Gates (née Joyce Ruth Getz), Buck had one child, journalist Joan Juliet Buck. He died in Paris on July 19, 2001.

== Partial filmography ==
- Report from the Aleutians (1943), cameraman
- The Battle of San Pietro (1944), cameraman
- The Killers (1946), assistant producer
- Brute Force (1947), associate producer
- The Naked City (1948), associate producer
- We Were Strangers (1949), associate producer
- Fixed Bayonets! (1951), producer
- Love Nest (1951), producer
- Treasure of the Golden Condor (1953), producer
- O.S.S. (1957–58), TV series producer
- The Day They Robbed the Bank of England (1960), producer
- Lord Jim (1965), associate producer
- Great Catherine (1968)
- Under Milk Wood (1971), executive producer
- The Ruling Class (1972), producer
- The Great Scout & Cathouse Thursday (1976), producer
