= Illegal (1955 film) =

1955 film by Lewis Allen

- Theatrical release poster
- Directed by: Lewis Allen
- Screenplay by: W.R. Burnett; James R. Webb
- Based on: The Mouthpiece; 1929 play by Frank J. Collins
- Produced by: Frank P. Rosenberg
- Starring: Edward G. Robinson; Nina Foch; Hugh Marlowe; Jayne Mansfield
- Cinematography: J. Peverell Marley
- Edited by: Thomas Reilly
- Music by: Max Steiner
- Distributed by: Warner Bros. Pictures
- Release date: October 28, 1955 (New York City)
- Running time: 88 minutes
- Country: United States
- Language: English

Illegal is a 1955 American film noir directed by Lewis Allen. It stars Edward G. Robinson, Nina Foch, Hugh Marlowe and Jayne Mansfield. It is the third film adaptation of the 1929 play "The Mouthpiece" by Frank J. Collins, following The Mouthpiece and The Man Who Talked Too Much.

== Plot ==
Victor Scott is a district attorney with a spectacular courtroom style. He acknowledges having risen from the slums and needing to win every case. He is assisted by attorney Ellen Miles, who is not quite as relentless, but is devoted to her D.A. boss. They have had a long relationship: in the past, Scott was encouraged and mentored by Ellen's own father, who, on his deathbed, got Scott to promise to protect Ellen. It is hinted Ellen would have welcomed a romantic relationship, but instead Scott encourages her to marry a co-worker, Ray Borden.

Scott prosecutes a sensational murder case (that of Gloria Benson, whose murder opens the film) and the jury hands down a guilty verdict. The judge sentences Edward Clary to die in the electric chair (not shown in the film) and the success of the case spurs Scott's interest in running for Governor. However, at the very hour of the execution, Scott discovers that a man whom police shot during the commission of a crime, confessed (in a dying declaration) to the murder. The declaration is deemed legitimate although no reason for the murder of Benson is referenced. Scott tries, but fails, to stop the execution.

Although the opposing attorneys, the jury, and the judge performed their respective duties in accordance with the law, the death of an innocent man greatly disturbs Scott; he resigns and falls into an alcoholic haze and is shunned by many former allies. While appearing in court on his own charge of being drunk and disorderly, he meets a man accused of a death in relation to a huge brawl and decides to defend him in court. He challenges a prosecution witness, a very large man, Mr. Taylor (Henry Kulky), whom Scott says was knocked out during a brawl and could not have witnessed the crime. When the man says a man of the defendant's size or Scott's size could not knock him out, Scott sucker-punches him with an obscured roll of nickels (that act like brass knuckles), knocking him down and, briefly, out. The case is dismissed and Scott has a new career as a defense attorney.

Scott ends up defending an associate of the city's crime boss, Frank Garland, a man he refused to work for earlier because "no one would testify against you; you own the people who work for you". The man is accused of murder by poison; in the courtroom, Scott wins by drinking from the poison bottle and resting his case, knowing that the prosecution will request a recess and he can then hurry to a doctor before the poison takes effect. Though not in Garland's pocket, Scott establishes a careful relationship with the gangster, leading him into direct confrontation with the very office he used to head.

There is an ongoing leak between the D.A.'s office and the crime boss. The leak turns out to be Ellen's husband, Borden. Ellen discovers this, leading to a confrontation in which she kills him in self-defense. But the new D.A. gets it backward, believing Ellen was the leak and that she murdered Borden when found out. She is prosecuted for murder and Scott defends her.

During a lunch recess, as protection, he has his secretary take his confidential case notes and mail them to herself: if Scott is killed by Garland, they can be used to convict. He then meets Garland who, looking to avoid being implicated, asks Scott to throw the case. The crime boss does not believe Scott can both win the case and keep him out of it. Garland has Scott followed and shot; but, before he can finish the job, the hit man is himself killed by the D.A.'s agents.

Rather than seeking medical treatment, Scott returns to court and calls Angel O'Hara, who had recently been living with Garland. Her testimony confirms that Borden spoke to Garland regularly, and made the phone call that led to Ellen learning that he was the leak. Ellen is cleared, but Scott collapses from his injuries.

== Cast ==
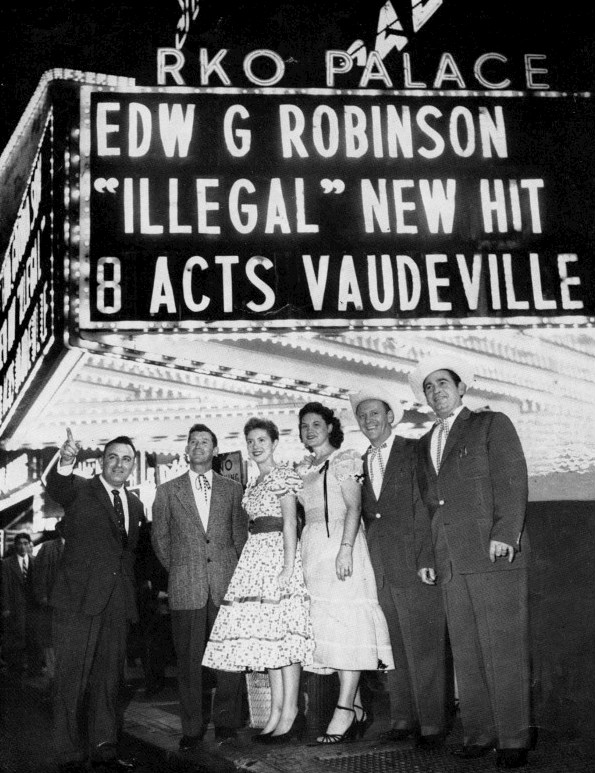
Film being shown in a New York City theater

- Edward G. Robinson as Victor Scott
- Nina Foch as Ellen Miles
- Hugh Marlowe as Ray Borden
- Jayne Mansfield as Angel O'Hara (singing voice was dubbed by Bonnie Lou Williams)
- Albert Dekker as Frank Garland
- Howard St. John as E.A. Smith
- Ellen Corby as Miss Hinkel
- Edward Platt as Ralph Ford
- Jan Merlin as Andy Garth
- Robert Ellenstein as Joe Knight
- Jay Adler as Joseph Carter
- Henry Kulky as Taylor
- James McCallion as Allen Parker
- Addison Richards as Steve Harper
- Lawrence Dobkin as Al Carol
- DeForest Kelley as Edward Clary, the wrongly convicted and executed man
- Roxanne Arlen as Miss Hathaway
- Archie R. Twitchell as Mr. Manning

== Production ==
The film was one of three movies set up by producer Frank Rosenberg at Warner Bros, the others being Miracle in the Rain and "US Marblehead". A theater marquee advertising Miracle in the Rain can be seen very briefly during a street sequence late in the film.

Robinson owned a considerable contemporary art collection that was used to decorate the set. The works included impressionist works by Gauguin, Degas, Duran, and Gladys Lloyd. Robinson was the subject of investigation by the House Un-American Activities Committee and it was reportedly the reason why the film was of a lower budget and caliber than his previous films.

The film offered a rare serious performance by the future sex symbol, Jayne Mansfield, who went on to star in hits like: The Girl Can't Help It (1956) and Will Success Spoil Rock Hunter? (1957).

== Reception ==
=== Critical response ===
Film critic Bosley Crowther compared the film to The Asphalt Jungle but thought it was not as good. He wrote, "For one thing, the story of Illegal invades the higher echelons of crime, with a fast-thinking, double-dealing lawyer as the principal character ... The fact that this hard-bitten lawyer is played by Edward G. Robinson in his old vein of stinging sarcasm is a clue to what you may expect. But more than this and more than the climate of sordid deceit that is achieved is the fact that Illegal tries to blueprint The Asphalt Jungle's Marilyn Monroe. You may remember that Miss Monroe's first screen role was in the latter. She spoke not a word [actually, Monroe does speak in The Asphalt Jungle, and it was not her first role], but she went right to work as an adornment in the apartment of the criminal counselor. Well, in Illegal Jayne Mansfield plays precisely the same sort of role in the apartment of Albert Dekker, the big poobah of crime. Miss Mansfield, we might add, is the beauty who is imitating Miss Monroe in a feeble imitation of Once In a Lifetime on the Broadway stage."

== See also ==
- List of American films of 1955
