= Gobs and Gals =

1952 film by R. G. Springsteen

- Theatrical release poster
- Directed by: R. G. Springsteen
- Screenplay by: Arthur T. Horman
- Produced by: Sidney Picker
- Starring: George Bernard; Bert Bernard; Robert Hutton; Cathy Downs; Gordon Jones; Florence Marly
- Cinematography: John MacBurnie
- Edited by: Arthur Roberts
- Music by: Stanley Wilson
- Production company: Republic Pictures
- Distributed by: Republic Pictures
- Release date: May 1, 1952
- Running time: 86 minutes
- Country: United States
- Language: English

Gobs and Gals is a 1952 American comedy film directed by R. G. Springsteen, written by Arthur T. Horman and starring George Bernard, Bert Bernard, Robert Hutton, Cathy Downs, Gordon Jones and Florence Marly. The film was released on May 1, 1952 by Republic Pictures.

== Cast ==
- George Bernard as Sparks Johnson / Mabel Mansfield
- Bert Bernard as Salty Conners / Myrtle Mansfield
- Robert Hutton as Lt. Steven F. Smith
- Cathy Downs as Betty Lou Prentice
- Gordon Jones as CPO Mike Donovan
- Florence Marly as Soyna DuBois
- Leon Belasco as Peter
- Emory Parnell as Senator Prentice
- Leonid Kinskey as Ivan
- Tommy Rettig as Bertram
- Minerva Urecal as Mrs. Pursell
- Olin Howland as Conductor
- Donald MacBride as Cmdr. J.E. Gerrens
- Henry Kulky as Boris
- Marie Blake as Bertram's Mother
