= Immortal Sergeant =

1943 film by John M. Stahl

- Directed by: John M. Stahl
- Written by: Lamar Trotti
- Based on: Immortal Sergeant; 1942 novel by John Brophy
- Produced by: Lamar Trotti
- Starring: Henry Fonda; Maureen O'Hara; Thomas Mitchell
- Cinematography: Arthur Miller
- Edited by: James B. Clark
- Music by: David Buttolph
- Color process: Black and white
- Production company: 20th Century Fox
- Distributed by: 20th Century Fox
- Release date: January 11, 1943
- Running time: 91 minutes
- Country: United States
- Language: English
- Box office: $2.2 million (US rentals)

Immortal Sergeant is a 1943 American war film directed by John M. Stahl for 20th Century Fox. Set in the North African desert during World War II, it stars Henry Fonda as a corporal lacking in confidence in both love and war, Maureen O'Hara as his girlfriend, and Thomas Mitchell as the title character. The film was based on the 1942 novel of the same name by John Brophy.

== Plot ==
In North Africa, experienced Sergeant Kelly leads a British patrol, accompanied by Corporal Colin Spence, an unassertive Canadian. When they are attacked by Italian airplanes, they manage to shoot one down, but it crashes on one of their vehicles, killing eight men. Later, Kelly leads the six survivors on an attack of an Italian armored car but is seriously wounded. He orders Spence to leave him behind; when Spence refuses to obey, he shoots himself.

Spence leads the remaining three men toward an oasis. Before they can reach it, though, a transport plane lands and disgorges German soldiers who set up a base. After sneaking in to steal badly needed food and water, Spence has to assert his leadership when one of his men advocates surrendering. Instead, Spence leads them in a surprise attack under the cover of a sandstorm. The British emerge victorious, though one man is killed and Spence is wounded.

The corporal comes to in a Cairo hospital and finds he is to be given a medal and promoted to lieutenant. His newfound assertiveness extends to his personal life. He proposes to his girlfriend Valentine, who he had thought of (in flashbacks) throughout his ordeal.

== Cast ==
- Henry Fonda as Cpl. Colin Spence
- Maureen O'Hara as Valentine Lee
- Thomas Mitchell as Sgt. Kelly
- Allyn Joslyn as Cassity
- Reginald Gardiner as Tom Benedict
- Melville Cooper as Pilcher
- Bramwell Fletcher as Symes
- Morton Lowry as Cottrell

== Reception ==
Theodore Strauss of The New York Times called the film "disappointing", writing that while it was "occasionally a warm and human study of a man's triumph over his own fears," the romance was "vapid" and O'Hara's character was "very dull". Variety called the film "a compact drama, interestingly told." Harrison's Reports wrote, "Although it does not reach great dramatic heights, and it is somewhat long drawn out, the production and the performances are so good that one's interest is held consistently." David Lardner of The New Yorker wrote that the desert peril scenes were the "most solid aspects of the picture and, since they are fairly well handled, succeed in putting it on its feet." Lardner was distracted, however, by "the strange difficulty O'Hara seems to have in pronouncing polysyllabic words."
