= Immortal Sergeant (novel) =

1942 novel

- First edition
- Author: John Brophy
- Language: English
- Genre: War
- Publisher: Collins
- Publication date: 1942
- Publication place: United Kingdom
- Media type: Print

Immortal Sergeant is a 1942 war novel by the British writer John Brophy. The novel is set during the North African campaign of the Second World War and seen through the eyes of a British corporal fighting across the Libyan Desert whose comrade, a sergeant, is killed.

== Film adaptation ==
In 1943 it was adapted into a Hollywood film Immortal Sergeant directed by John M. Stahl and starring Henry Fonda, Maureen O'Hara and Thomas Mitchell. The plot was then recycled for a 1951 film Fixed Bayonets! about American troops set during the Korean War.

== Bibliography ==
- Goble, Alan. The Complete Index to Literary Sources in Film. Walter de Gruyter, 1999.
- Watson, George & Willison, Ian R. The New Cambridge Bibliography of English Literature, Volume 4. CUP, 1972.
