= John Brophy (writer) =

British journalist and novelist (1899–1965)

John Brophy in 1942

John Brophy (6 December 1899 – 13 November 1965) was a British soldier, journalist and author who wrote more than 40 books, mostly based on his experiences during World War I.

Brophy was born in Liverpool in Lancashire in 1899 of Irish descent, the son of John Brophy, an earthenware dealer, and his wife Agnes, née Bodell. He lied about his age to join the British Army during World War I aged just 14, serving for four years in the infantry before being honourably discharged in 1918. After the War he attended the University of Liverpool financed by a government grant and where he took his BA in 1922 before attending Durham University for a year where he studied Psychoanalysis and took a Certificate in Education in 1923. In 1924 he married Charis Weare Grundy (1895/6–1975), a teacher and the daughter of James Grundy, a clergyman from Chicago, and with her he had one child, the author Brigid Brophy.

After leaving university Brophy taught at a school in Cairo for two years in the 1920s before his wife's ill health forced him to return to England. His wife later wrote of her time in Egypt in her book Egyptian Portrait (c1930). Brophy later worked in a general store and as an advertising copywriter before becoming a full-time author, publishing his first novel, The Bitter End, in 1928, and going on to write about 40 books, mostly based on his experiences as a soldier in the British Army during World War I. These included Pluck the Flower and Paul Lavelle (1929), as well as an anthology, The Soldier's War. In 1930 with Eric Partridge he edited Songs and Slang of the British Soldier, 1914–1918 (in 1965 revised as The Long Trail). Through the 1930s he published at least one novel a year but it was not until 1939 that he had a real success, with his fictional life of William Shakespeare, Gentleman of Stratford.

Brophy was also a critic for various London newspapers and magazines including The Daily Telegraph and Time and Tide as well as for the BBC. He was the editor of John O'London's Weekly from 1940 to 1943 and during World War II he served in the Home Guard, for which he wrote handbooks and manuals and published the 'character study' Britain's Home Guard in 1945, which was illustrated by Eric Kennington. During the war years Brophy produced an 'entertainment' called Solitude Island (1941) and wrote war novels including Immortal Sergeant (1942), made into the 1943 film of the same name starring Henry Fonda; Spear Head (published in the United States as Spearhead, 1943) and Target Island (1944).

Brophy's later works included books on art such as The Human Face Reconsidered (1962), The Face in Western Art (1963); and The Face of the Nude (1965). His 1952 work on W. Somerset Maugham was written for the British Council, and his later novels included City of Departures (1946), A Woman from Nowhere (1946), Sarah (1948), Julian's Way (1949), Turn the Key Softly (1951) (filmed in 1953), The Prime of Life (1954), and The Day They Robbed the Bank of England (1959), made into a 1960 film of the same name starring Peter O'Toole and Aldo Ray. He was a member of the Reform Club, the English PEN, the Society of Authors and the National Book League.

John Brophy died of heart failure at the Royal Waterloo Hospital in Lambeth, London in November 1965.

== Selected novels ==
- The Bitter End (1928)
- Waterfront (1934)
- Gentleman of Stratford (1939)
- Green Glory (1940)
- Green Ladies (1940)
- Immortal Sergeant (1942)
- Spear Head (1943)
- Target Island (1944)
- Portrait of an Unknown Lady (1945)
- Julian’s Way (1949)
- Turn the Key Softly (1951)
- The Nimble Rabbit (1955)
- Soldier of the Queen (1957) (Green Glory (1940) and Green Ladies (1940) combined into single volume and revised by author)
- The Day They Robbed the Bank of England (1959)
