= George and Bert Bernard =

American comedy dancers and mime artists

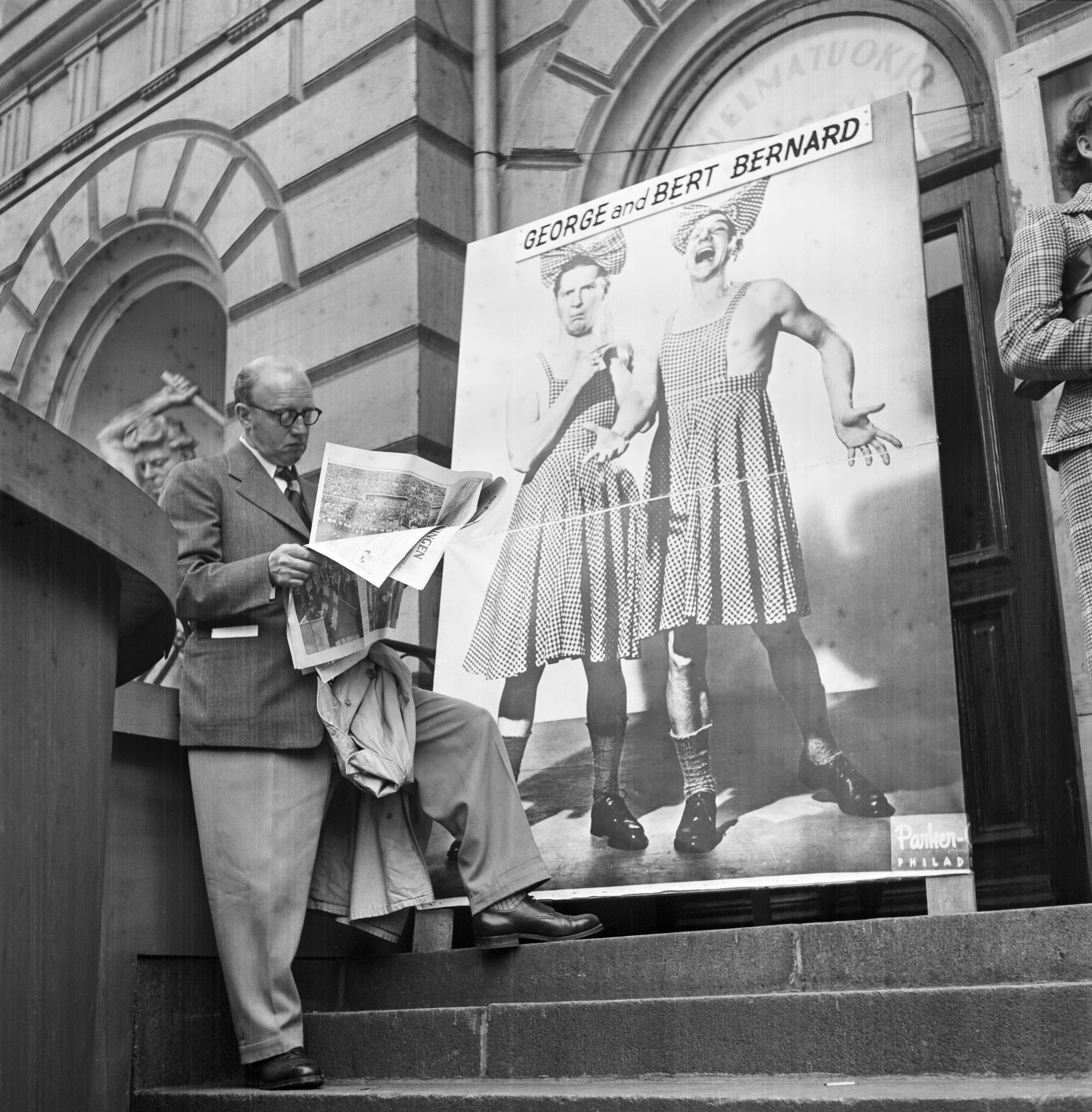
George and Bert Bernard poster in Helsinki in 1952

George and Bert Bernard, sometimes credited as The Bernard Brothers, were a duo of American comedy dancers and mime artists, who were popular in variety shows from the 1930s to the 1960s. They were in fact unrelated: Bernard Franklin George (July 1, 1912–October 22, 1967) and Herbert James Maxwell (June 23, 1917–February 23, 2004).

== Career ==
Bernard George, later known as George Bernard, was born in Cumberland, Maryland, in 1912. As a child, he performed as a tap dancer, moving into revues and nightclub appearances by the end of the 1920s. When appearing in cabaret in Washington, D.C. in 1932, he met vaudeville and comedy dancer Bert Maxwell, who had been born in Boston, Massachusetts in 1917. They began working together as The Bernard Dancers, presenting a comedic ballet routine and touring in North and South America. In 1938, they toured Europe, appearing at the Folies Bergère in Paris, and in London.

In 1941 Bert Maxwell joined the U.S. Army Air Force, in which he was awarded the Distinguished Flying Cross, while George Bernard continued to work as a solo entertainer with the USO. They reunited after the war, and developed an act called "Off the Record", often in drag, in which they mimed with "exquisitely precise" timing to popular records of the day, such as those by The Andrews Sisters. Their "sound man", George Pierce, was unseen backstage, but was credited in their act. They established a residency at Le Lido in Paris, topped the bill at the London Casino, and in 1948 appeared in the Royal Variety Performance and in Val Parnell's production of the pantomime Cinderella, becoming one of the most popular comedy acts of the period in British variety theatres. The brothers also appeared at the Blue Angel nightclub in New York.

They appeared together in several films, including Paris Nights (1951), Gobs and Gals (1952), and Decameron Nights (1952). During the 1950s their popularity diminished, partly as a result of record companies refusing to allow them to use their recordings of popular artists. However, they continued to perform and appear on television variety shows both in Europe and the U.S.. George Bernard died in 1967, at the age of 55, following a show in Vancouver, Canada. Bert Bernard continued to perform in the U.S. with a new partner, known as Les Bernard. Bert Bernard died in California in 2004 at the age of 86.
