= Jacob Wirth Restaurant =

Defunct restaurant in Boston, Massachusetts

- Jacob Wirth Buildings
- U.S. National Register of Historic Places
- Boston Landmark
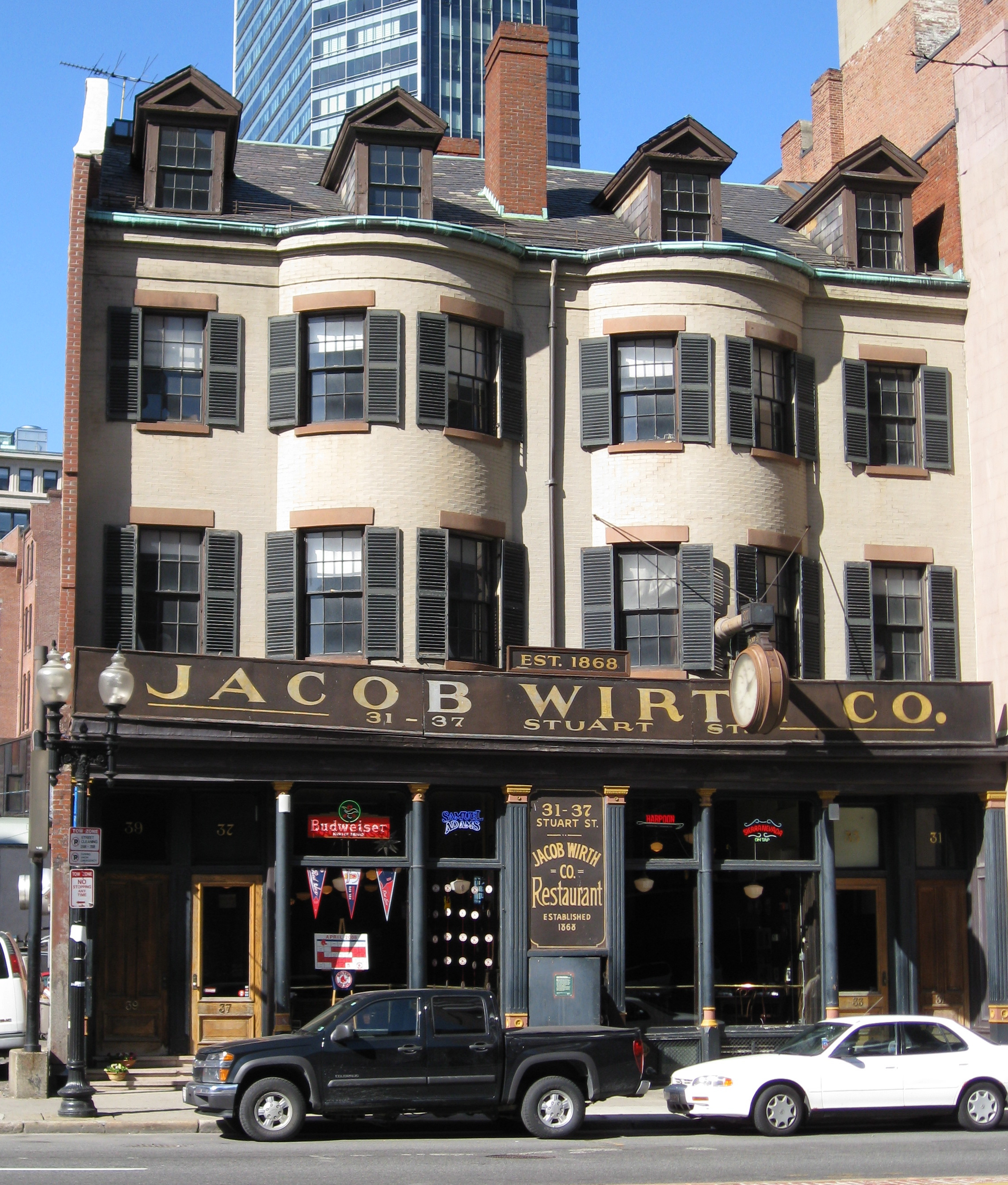

- Location within Boston Location within Massachusetts Location within the United States
- Location: Boston, Massachusetts
- Coordinates: 42°21′04.2″N 71°03′49.8″W
- Built: 1844
- Architect: Multiple
- Architectural style: Greek Revival
- MPS: Boston Theatre MRA
- NRHP reference No.: 80000442

Significant dates
- Added to NRHP: December 9, 1980
- Designated BOSL: November 30, 1977

The Jacob Wirth Restaurant was a historic German-American restaurant and bar in Boston, Massachusetts, at 31-39 Stuart Street. Founded in 1868, Jacob Wirth was the second-oldest continuously operated restaurant in Boston when it closed in 2018.

The Greek Revival building housing the restaurant was constructed in 1844. The German-style restaurant was founded in 1868 and was the second oldest continuously operating restaurant in the city after the Union Oyster House. The restaurant was added to the National Register of Historic Places in 1980 and designated a Boston Landmark in 1977, with interior and exterior protections. Jacob Wirth was the first distributor of Anheuser Busch products. The Wirth family and the Anheuser family are from the same small town in Germany.

In 2010, Chelsea developer AJ Simboli Real Estate purchased the property for $1.6 million. The restaurant was put up for sale in January 2018 after having filed for Chapter 11 bankruptcy, and closed following a fire in June of that year. As recently as October 2021 there was a restoration effort under way to repair fire damage and reopen the restaurant as it had been before its closure.

In March 2022, the building was purchased by Greater Boston Bar Co. for $5.27 million. Their initial hope was to reopen the restaurant by the end of 2022. The new owners planned to reopen the restaurant in early 2024. The building was gutted on June 25, 2024, in a large fire.

== Popular culture ==
In George V. Higgins's 1974 novel Cogan's Trade, a meeting takes place at the restaurant.

A wedding scene for the 2010 film Knight and Day, starring Tom Cruise and Cameron Diaz, was filmed at the restaurant.

In Dennis Lehane's 2023 novel, Small Mercies, two characters have a date in Jacob Wirth's.

== See also ==
- National Register of Historic Places listings in northern Boston, Massachusetts
- The Student Prince, historical German restaurant in Springfield, Massachusetts
