= Paul Monash =

American television and film producer and screenwriter (1917–2003)

- Born: June 14, 1917; Harlem, New York City, New York, United States
- Died: January 14, 2003 (aged 85); Los Angeles, California, United States
- Occupations: Screenwriter, television producer, film producer

Paul Monash (June 14, 1917 – January 14, 2003) was an American television and film producer and screenwriter.

== Life and career ==
Paul Monash was born in Harlem, New York, in 1917, and grew up in The Bronx. His mother, Rhoda Melrose, acted in silent films. Monash earned a bachelor's degree in journalism from the University of Wisconsin–Madison and a master's degree in education from Columbia University. An aspiring novelist, he rode the rails across the United States, served as a merchant marine, lived as an expatriate in Paris, and studied art.

Monash won early acclaim for his writing for television, including his work on the pioneer anthology series Studio One, Suspense and Playhouse 90. He received an Emmy Award for "The Lonely Wizard," a 1957 episode of Schlitz Playhouse of Stars that starred Rod Steiger. Monash wrote and produced the pilot for the TV series The Untouchables (1959), shown in two parts on Desilu Playhouse and edited as a feature film for distribution in Europe. He also wrote some episodes of the 1958–1959 NBC docudrama about the Cold War, Behind Closed Doors, hosted by and starring Bruce Gordon.

After the success of The Untouchables, Monash was asked to create Peyton Place (1964–1969), an ABC-TV series that was the first prime-time serialized drama on American television.

His film production credits include Butch Cassidy and the Sundance Kid (1969), Slaughterhouse-Five (1972), The Front Page (1974) and Carrie (1976). Monash produced the feature film The Friends of Eddie Coyle (1973), a dark, critically acclaimed crime drama starring Robert Mitchum, and also adapted the George V. Higgins novel for the screen.

Monash wrote the 1979 CBS-TV adaption of All Quiet on the Western Front, a Hallmark Hall of Fame production that received a Golden Globe Award for Best Motion Picture Made for Television. His screenplay for the HBO film Stalin (1992) was nominated for an Emmy Award; and Monash received the Humanitas Prize for his teleplay for the TNT film George Wallace (1997).

His final credit was the A&E Network original film, The Golden Spiders: A Nero Wolfe Mystery (2000), a critically praised adaption of the Rex Stout novel. The TV movie first aired March 5, 2000, the same day that the Writers Guild of America, west, presented the 83-year-old Monash with the Paddy Chayefsky award for lifetime achievement. It is the guild's highest award, given to writers who have "advanced the literature of television through the years."

Paul Monash died of pancreatic cancer January 14, 2003, in Los Angeles.

== Filmography ==
=== Writer ===
- Foreign Intrigue (TV)

"Berlin to Frankfurt" (1952)
"The Radio Message" (1952)
"Sun Lamp" (1952)
" The Living Corpse" (1952)
"The Perfect Plan" (1952)

- Atom Squad (1953)
- Suspense (TV)

"Needle in a Haystack" (1953)
"The Man Who Wouldn't Talk" (1954)

- Operation Manhunt (1954)
- Danger (TV)

"Last Stop Before Albany" (1953)
"Return Flight" (1953)
"Five Minutes to Die" (1953)
"Cornered" (1954)
"Menace from the East (1954)

- Studio One (TV)

"Stan, the Killer" (1952)
"Blow Up at Cortland" (1955)

- Climax! (TV)

"Sailor on Horseback" (1955)
"Bailout at 43,000 Feet" (1955)

- Big Town (TV)

"Hung Jury" (1956)

- Colonel March of Scotland Yard (TV)

"The Sorcerer" (1956)
"The Strange Event at Roman Fall" (1956)
"The Deadly Gift" (1956)

- Studio 57 (TV)

" Outpost" (1956)

- General Electric Theater (TV)

"The Shadow Outside" (1956)

- Assignment Foreign Legion (TV)

"The Stripes of Sergeant Schweiger" (1956)
"The Sword of Truth" (1956)
"The White Kepi" (1957)
"The Testimonial of a Soldier" (1957)

- Kraft Television Theatre (TV)

"Boy in a Cage" (1956)
"The Singin' Idol" (1957)

- Bailout at 43,000 (1957)
- Schlitz Playhouse of Stars (TV)

"The Lonely Wizard" (1957) (Emmy Award)

- Sing, Boy, Sing (1958) (story "The Singin' Idol")
- The Safecracker (1958)
- Touch of Evil (1958) (uncredited)
- Playhouse 90 (TV)

"The Country Husband" (1956)
"The Helen Morgan Story" (1957)
"The Death of Manolete" (1957)
"Nightmare at Ground Zero" (1958)

- The Gun Runners (1958)
- Behind Closed Doors (TV)

"The Cape Canaveral Story" (1958)

- Pursuit (TV)

"The Silent Night" (1958)

- Goodyear Theatre (TV)

"The Guy in Ward 4" (1958)
"Afternoon of the Beast" (1959)

- The Scarface Mob (TV) (1959) (pilot for The Untouchables)
- Westinghouse Desilu Playhouse (TV)

Debut (1958)
"The Untouchables: Part 1" (1959)
"The Untouchables: Part 2" (1959)

- The Crimebusters (1961)
- The Asphalt Jungle (TV)

"The Lady and the Lawyer" (1961)
"The Fighter" (1961)
"The Kidnapping" (1961)

- The Lawbreakers (1961)
- Cain's Hundred (TV) (1961–1962)
- Twelve O'Clock High (TV)

"Follow the Leader" (1964) (uncredited)

- Braddock (TV) (1968)
- Judd, for the Defense (TV) (1967–1969)
- Peyton Place (TV) (1964–1969)
- The Friends of Eddie Coyle (1973)
- All Quiet on the Western Front (TV) (1979)
- Salem's Lot (TV) (1979)
- V (TV)

" Liberation Day" (1984)

- Stalin (TV) (1992)
- Killer Rules (TV) (1993)
- Kingfish: A Story of Huey P. Long (TV) (1995)
- George Wallace (TV) (1997)
- Rescuers: Stories of Courage – Two Couples (TV) (1998) (segment "Aart and Johtje Vos")
- The Golden Spiders: A Nero Wolfe Mystery (TV) (2000)

=== Producer ===
- Cain's Hundred (TV) (1961–1962) (executive producer)
- Braddock (TV) (1968)
- Deadfall (1968)
- Judd, for the Defense (TV) (1967–1969) (executive producer)
- Peyton Place (TV) (1964–1969) (executive producer)
- Butch Cassidy and the Sundance Kid (1969) (executive producer)
- Slaughterhouse-Five (1972)
- The Friends of Eddie Coyle (1973)
- The Front Page (1974)
- The Trial of Chaplain Jensen (TV) (1975) (executive producer)
- Carrie (1976)
- The Day the Loving Stopped (TV) (1981) (executive producer)
- Child Bride of Short Creek (TV) (1981)
- Big Trouble in Little China (1986) (executive producer)
- The Rage: Carrie 2 (1999)
- Carrie (TV) (2002) (consulting producer)

== Awards ==
- 1958, Winner, Emmy Award
  Schlitz Playhouse of Stars (episode "The Lonely Wizard")
  Best Teleplay Writing – Half Hour or Less
  Academy of Television Arts & Sciences
- 1980, Nominee, Edgar Award
  Salem's Lot
  Best Television Feature or Miniseries
  Mystery Writers of America
- 1993, Nominee, Emmy Award
  Stalin
  Outstanding Individual Achievement in Writing in a Miniseries or a Special
  Academy of Television Arts & Sciences
- 1997, Nominee, CableACE Award
  George Wallace
  Writing a Movie or Miniseries
  Shared with Marshall Frady
  National Cable Television Association
- 1998, Winner, Humanitas Prize
  George Wallace
  PBS/Cable Category
  Shared with Marshall Frady
- 1998, Nominee, WGA Award
  George Wallace
  Adapted Long Form
  Shared with Marshall Frady
  Writers Guild of America
- 1999, Nominee, Humanitas Prize
  Rescuers: Stories of Courage – Two Couples (segment "Aart and Johtje Vos")
  60 Minute Category
  Shared with Cy Chermak and Francine Carroll
- 2000, Winner, Paddy Chayefsky Laurel Award for Lifetime Achievement
  Writers Guild of America, west
