= Andrew Dominik =

Australian film director (born 1967)

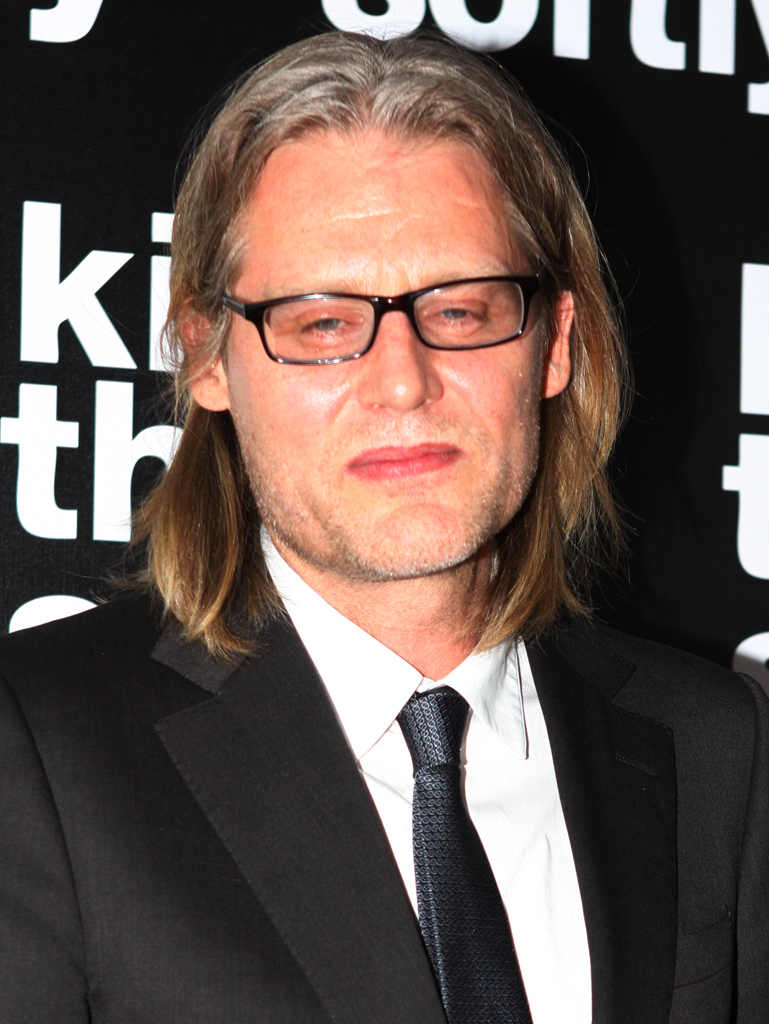
- Dominik at the Australian premiere of Killing Them Softly, 2012
- Born: 7 October 1967 (age 58); Wellington, New Zealand
- Education: Swinburne Film School
- Occupations: Film director; screenwriter
- Years active: 2000–present
- Children: 1

Andrew Dominik (born 7 October 1967) is an Australian film director and screenwriter. He has directed the crime film Chopper (2000) for which he won the AACTA Award for Best Direction, the Western drama film The Assassination of Jesse James by the Coward Robert Ford (2007), the neo-noir crime film Killing Them Softly (2012), and the biographical psychological drama Blonde (2022). He has also directed the documentary film One More Time with Feeling (2016) and two episodes of the Netflix series Mindhunter in 2019.

== Early life and career ==
Born in Wellington, New Zealand, Andrew Dominik has lived in Australia since he was two years old. He graduated from Melbourne's Swinburne Film School in 1988.

In the early 1990s, Dominik began collaborating with Australian film producer Michele Bennett on music videos and commercials in Sydney.

== Career ==
=== 2000–2016: Early career and acclaim ===
His career in films began in 2000 when he directed Chopper based on notorious Australian criminal Mark Brandon "Chopper" Read, starring Eric Bana and Simon Lyndon. Chopper received generally positive reviews, and Bana in particular was widely praised for his intense portrayal of Chopper. The Australian Film Institute awarded the film with Best Director (Dominik), Best Actor (Bana), and Best Supporting Actor (Lyndon).

His next film was The Assassination of Jesse James by the Coward Robert Ford, starring Brad Pitt and Casey Affleck, based on the novel of the same name which he came across in a second-hand bookstore. The film explores the peculiar relationship between Jesse James and his eventual assassin Robert Ford. Pitt was a big fan of Dominik's first feature Chopper, and had hoped to collaborate with the filmmaker in the future, especially when Pitt had the chance to work with Chopper star Eric Bana in Troy. Pitt contacted the director, and with a big star interested to lead his new film, Dominik was therefore able to get Warner Bros. to finance the production.

Principal shooting in Canada was completed in 2005, though The Assassination's 2006 release was delayed to a fall 2007 release, largely due to studio interference with the film's editing process. Dominik and Pitt were pulling for a less quick-paced and more contemplative cut of the film while the studio wanted "less contemplation and more action". There were reportedly more than a dozen edited versions of the film at one time fighting to be the final cut, the longest version being over four hours. The disputes during post-production lasted for over a year before a final version was settled upon. Over an hour of scenes were deleted for the theatrical version, but Dominik remarked he was still very proud of the theatrical version of the film. The film garnered two Academy Award nominations: Best Cinematography (Deakins) and Best Supporting Actor (Affleck).

Dominik reteamed with Brad Pitt in their second collaboration (after The Assassination of Jesse James) in a thriller/dark comedy based on George V. Higgins' Boston-set crime novel Cogan's Trade. The film was renamed Killing Them Softly. Shooting began in January 2011 and wrapped in May 2011. The film competed for the Palme d'Or at the 2012 Cannes Film Festival. and was released through the Weinstein Company.

=== 2016–present ===
In 2016, Dominik completed One More Time with Feeling, a documentary about his friend Nick Cave and the emotional consequences of the tragic death of Cave's son. The film premiered at the 2016 Venice Film Festival. The critical aggregator website Metacritic awarded the film a score of 91, indicating "universal acclaim". Dominik joined David Fincher for season 2 of Netflix series Mindhunter, which debuted in late 2019. Dominik directed two episodes.

In 2022, Dominik completed Blonde, based on Joyce Carol Oates's fictional Marilyn Monroe memoir of the same name, which was scheduled to start shooting in January 2011 but the project was put on hold when he announced Killing Them Softly. In 2014 Jessica Chastain was in talks to play Monroe. In late 2019, Cuban actress Ana de Armas was cast in the lead role. Blonde had its world premiere at the 79th Venice Film Festival on 8 September 2022, and was released in the United States on 16 September 2022, before its streaming release on 28 September 2022, by Netflix. It is rated NC-17 for its graphic sexual content and is the first NC-17 film released through a streaming service.

In 2025, Dominik finished production on a documentary for Apple Original Films called Bono: Stories of Surrender, about the making of the U2 singer and songwriter Bono. The film premiered on 30 May on Apple TV+.

== Unrealised projects ==
In 2003, Paramount Pictures approached Dominik and offered him to direct an adaptation of Alfred Bester's 1953 novel The Demolished Man, but as time passed, the project eventually became stuck in development hell when there were disagreements about the screenplay. By 2003, Dominik had also written an adapted screenplay for The Killer Inside Me, an acclaimed noir novel by Jim Thompson, and was at one point considered to direct it, but dropped out. Michael Winterbottom eventually directed the 2010 film.

In 2007, Dominik wrote a screenplay adaptation of Cormac McCarthy's Cities of the Plain; however, in 2008, Dominik said plans for it fell through. In a 2008 interview, Dominik stated that he has interest in adapting Jim Thompson's Pop. 1280. In 2010, Dominik was writing a script for an American remake of the 2006 French thriller Tell No One. It was unclear if he intended to direct the film.

In 2014, it was announced that Dominik would write a 3D remake of Shaolin Temple with Justin Lin set to direct. In 2017, Netflix picked up War Party, a Navy SEAL adventure film written by Dominik and Harrison Query with Tom Hardy attached to star and Ridley Scott set to produce under Dominik's direction.

Around the time of Blonde, Dominik's name was also linked as screenwriter/director of a project called Sturlungar, which was to be a television series for Truenorth about the Sturlungs, a powerful, wealthy family clan during the time of the Icelandic Commonwealth in 13th century Iceland. Leifur B. Dagfinnsson, Grant Hill, Fridrik Thor Fridriksson and Kristinn Thordarson were attached as executive producers.

== Influences ==
In the 2012 Sight & Sound poll of the greatest films of all time, Dominik chose:

- Apocalypse Now (1979)
- Badlands (1973)
- Barry Lyndon (1975)
- Blue Velvet (1986)
- Marnie (1964)
- Mulholland Drive (2001)
- The Night of the Hunter (1955)
- Raging Bull (1980)
- Sunset Boulevard (1950)
- The Tenant (1976)

== Personal life ==
Dominik has one son. He was engaged to actress Bella Heathcote in 2017. They later called off their engagement.

== Filmography ==
=== Film ===
Year	Title	Director	Writer
2000	Chopper	Yes	Yes
2007	The Assassination of Jesse James by the Coward Robert Ford	Yes	Yes
2012	Killing Them Softly	Yes	Yes
2022	Blonde	Yes	Yes

Documentaries

- One More Time with Feeling (2016)
- This Much I Know to Be True (2022)
- I Don't Work for Peanuts, I Work for God (2024)
- Bono: Stories of Surrender (2025)

=== Television ===
Year	Title	Episode
2019	Mindhunter	"Episode 4" (S2 E4)
2019	Mindhunter	"Episode 5" (S2 E5)

=== Music videos ===
- "Down in Splendour" (1990) – Straightjacket Fits
- "Fall at Your Feet" (1991) – Crowded House
- "Cat Inna Can" (1993) – Straightjacket Fits
- "Tupelo - 40th Birthday" (2025) – Nick Cave & The Bad Seeds

== Awards ==
Year	Group	Award	Result	Title
1994	ARIA Music Awards	Best Video	Nominated	"The Honeymoon Is Over" by The Cruel Sea
1999	ARIA Music Awards	Best Video	Nominated	"You'll Do" by The Cruel Sea
2000	AFI Awards	Best Director	Won	Chopper
2000	AFI Awards	Best Adapted Screenplay	Nominated	Chopper
2000	IF Awards	Best Independent New Filmmaker	Won	Chopper
2000	Stockholm International Film Festival	Bronze Horse	Nominated	Chopper
2001	Buenos Aires International Festival of Independent Cinema	Best Film	Nominated	Chopper
2001	Cognac Festival du Film Policier	Critics Award	Won	Chopper
2001	Cognac Festival du Film Policier	Grand Prix	Won	Chopper
2001	Film Critics Circle of Australia Awards	Best Director	Won	Chopper
2001	Film Critics Circle of Australia Awards	Best Adapted Screenplay	Nominated	Chopper
2007	Venice Film Festival	Golden Lion	Nominated	The Assassination of Jesse James by the Coward Robert Ford
2008	Film Critics Circle of Australia Awards	Best Foreign Film – English Language	Nominated	The Assassination of Jesse James by the Coward Robert Ford
2008	Western Writers of America	Best Western Drama	Won	The Assassination of Jesse James by the Coward Robert Ford
2012	65th Cannes Film Festival	Palme d'Or	Nominated	Killing Them Softly
2012	Stockholm International Film Festival	Bronze Horse	Nominated	Killing Them Softly
2012	Stockholm International Film Festival	Best Screenplay	Won	Killing Them Softly
2022	79th Venice International Film Festival	Golden Lion	Nominated	Blonde
2023	43rd Golden Raspberry Awards	Worst Director	Nominated	Blonde
2023	43rd Golden Raspberry Awards	Worst Screen Combo (shared with his issues with women)	Nominated	Blonde
2023	43rd Golden Raspberry Awards	Worst Screenplay	Won	Blonde
