= Branded (1950 film) =

1950 film by Rudolph Maté

- Theatrical release poster
- Directed by: Rudolph Maté
- Written by: Winston Miller; Frederick Hazlitt Brennan
- Screenplay by: Sydney Boehm; Cyril Hume
- Based on: Montana Rides by Max Brand
- Produced by: Mel Epstein
- Starring: Alan Ladd; Mona Freeman; Charles Bickford; Robert Keith
- Cinematography: Charles Lang; W. Wallace Kelley
- Edited by: Alma Macrorie
- Music by: Roy Webb
- Production company: Paramount Pictures
- Distributed by: Paramount Pictures
- Release date: December 23, 1950 (San Francisco)
- Running time: 94 minutes
- Country: United States
- Language: English
- Box office: $2.2 million (US rentals)

Branded is a 1950 American Technicolor Western film starring Alan Ladd, Mona Freeman, Charles Bickford and Robert Keith. It was adapted from the novel Montana Rides by Max Brand under the pen name Evan Evans. The plot concerns a gunfighter on the run from the law who poses as the long-lost son of a wealthy rancher.

== Plot ==
Choya, a gunfighter on the run, is caught by cowboys Leffingwell and Tattoo in the mountains. They force him to participate in a scheme to bilk a rich rancher named Lavery. The plan requires a tattoo on Choya's shoulder, but as soon as Tattoo creates one, Leffingwell shoots him in the back.

Choya rides to Lavery's Bar O M ranch and asks foreman Ransome for a job. Lavery, with daughter Ruth, arrives on horseback and hires Choya. Ruth tells Choya how her five-year-old brother was kidnapped many years ago, never to be seen again. One day, Lavery notices Choya's tattoo and is amazed because his long-lost son had a birthmark just like it. Choya pretends that it is a coincidence and tells a story about a childhood memory that convinces Mr. and Mrs. Lavery that he is Richard Jr.

Leffingwell arrives and is hired at the ranch. His plot is to kill Lavery so that Choya can inherit the ranch. A guilt-ridden Choya offers him an alternative, to steal Lavery's stock during a cattle roundup. Ruth rides along, and because Choya likes her, he double-crosses Leffingwell and has the cattle money deposited in the Laverys' account in an El Paso bank. He also learns that Leffingwell is the one who kidnapped the child, only to have a Mexican bandit named Rubriz snatch the boy. He confesses to Ruth and leaves the ranch.

Choya crosses the border and learns that Lavery's son has been raised by Rubriz under the name of Tonio. He persuades Tonio to return to his real home. Rubriz, who has raised the boy as his own son, sends his men after them, and Tonio is wounded. Leffingwell also chases them but is killed in a stampede. Choya and Tonio are trapped on the Texas side of the Rio Grande but are rescued just in time by Lavery and Ransome.

Rubriz comes to the ranch with his men to kill them, but he is disarmed by Choya, who convinces him that Tonio did not betray him. Rubriz has a change of heart and tells Lavery that Tonio should stay with the Lavery family until he has recovered from his wound, and Lavery agrees that Rubriz can visit any time. Choya plans to ride away for good, but Ruth follows him and tells him that if he is leaving, she will accompany him. She joins him on his horse, they kiss, and Choya heads his horse back toward the ranch house.

== Cast ==
- Alan Ladd as Choya
- Mona Freeman as Ruth Lavery
- Charles Bickford as Mr. Richard Lavery
- Robert Keith as T. Jefferson Leffingwell
- Joseph Calleia as Rubriz
- Peter Hansen as Tonio
- Selena Royle as Mrs. Lavery
- Tom Tully as Ransom
- John Berkes as Tattoo
- Milburn Stone as Dawson
- Martin Garralaga as Hernandez
- Paul Featherstone as Cowhand #1

== Production ==
=== Original novel ===
The film is based on the 1933 novel Montana Rides by Max Brand as Evan Evans. In 1949, RKO had released a Tom Keene Western titled Montana Rides, but the plot of that film was different.

The novel concerns a gunman named Montana, also known as the Arizona Kid or Mexico Kid, who impersonates the missing son of cattle magnate Richard Lavery. It was so popular that it led to a sequel novel, Montana Rides Again, in which the Montana Kid is lured into Mexico by bandits Mateo Rubriz and Friar Pacaul, who plan to steal an emerald from the governor that had been looted from a church.

=== Development ===
In 1948, Winston Miller sold the story to Paramount, which sought to produce a film vehicle for Alan Ladd, with Miller to write the script and Robert Fellows to produce. Leslie Fenton was originally set to direct, but when he was assigned to The Jewell, the film was handed to Rudolph Maté. Mel Epstein became the producer.

In March 1950, the film was retitled Branded.

=== Filming ===
The film was mostly shot on location in Arizona in the border country near Douglas. Locations included Salt River Canyon, in the Dragoon Mountains, at the Slaughter Ranch and at Cave Creek Canyon.

== Reception ==
The New York Times called the film "an exceptionally absorbing and exciting tale." The Los Angeles Times called it a "swinging, lilting Western... written with incredibly quiet savagery."

The film was a hit at the British box office, judged by Kinematograph Weekly as a "notable performer" at British cinemas in 1951.
