= The Human Jungle =

The Human Jungle may refer to:

- The Human Jungle (film), 1954 US film directed by Joseph M. Newman
- The Human Jungle (TV series), 1960s British TV series
