= Joseph M. Newman =

American film director

- Born: August 17, 1909; Logan, Utah, United States
- Died: January 23, 2006 (aged 96); Simi Valley, California, United States
- Occupation: Film director
- Years active: 1933 – 1965

Joseph M. Newman (August 17, 1909 – January 23, 2006) was an American film director most famous for his 1955 film This Island Earth. His credits include episodes of The Twilight Zone and The Alfred Hitchcock Hour.

He was nominated for two Academy Awards in the now defunct category of Assistant Director, for David Copperfield and San Francisco. He was also the last person nominated Assistant Director to die.

== Career ==
=== Assistant director ===
Newman first established his reputation in the industry as an assistant director at MGM. He worked on Clear All Wires! (1933), Gabriel Over the White House (1933), The Nuisance (1933), Another Language (1933), Dinner at Eight (1933), Stage Mother (1933), Going Hollywood (1933), Riptide (1934), and The Merry Widow (1934), working with Ernst Lubitsch.

He was nominated for an Oscar for David Copperfield (1935), and worked on China Seas (1935), and I Live My Life (1935), Rose-Marie (1936). San Francisco (1936) earned him another Oscar nomination. He worked as assistant director on Lady of the Tropics (1937), Maytime (1937), The Firefly (1937), and Too Hot to Handle (1938).

=== Director of shorts ===
Newman began directing short films starting with Man's Greatest Friend (1938). He followed it with The Story of Alfred Nobel (1938), Money to Loan (1939), The Story That Couldn't Be Printed (1939) (the story of John Zenger), Maintain the Right (1940), Know Your Money (1940) (part of the Crime Does Not Pay series), Women in Hiding (1940), Cat College (1940), Buyer Beware (1940), Respect the Law (1941), Coffins on Wheels (1941), Triumph Without Drums (1941), Don't Talk (1942), and Vendetta (1942).

Newman returned to assistant directing with Tarzan's Secret Treasure (1941) and The Bugle Sounds (1942).

=== Feature director ===
Newman made his debut as a director of feature films with Northwest Rangers (1941), a B-movie about the Canadian Mounties starring James Craig.

Newman served as a major with the U.S. Army Signal Corps during World War II. While there, he directed the short film Diary of a Sergeant (1945) starring Harold Russell which led to Russell's appearance in The Best Years of Our Lives (1946).

After the war, Newman returned to directing shorts at MGM: The Luckiest Guy in the World (1947) and The Amazing Mr. Nordill (1947).

He went back to features with the low budget Jungle Patrol (1948) at Fox. He went on to direct The Great Dan Patch (1949), the film noir crime dramas Abandoned (1949), with Gale Storm, and 711 Ocean Drive, which starred Edmond O'Brien.

Newman directed George Raft in Lucky Nick Cain (1951) a.k.a. I'll Get You For This in England, distributed by Fox.

=== 20th Century Fox ===
Newman went to Fox where he directed The Guy Who Came Back (1951); Love Nest (1952), featuring an early supporting role for Marilyn Monroe. The studio were impressed and assigned him to larger budgeted films: Red Skies of Montana (1952) with Richard Widmark; and The Outcasts of Poker Flat (1952).

Fox picked up his option and he directed Pony Soldier (1952) with Tyrone Power; and Dangerous Crossing (1953) with Michael Rennie.

In 1952 it was announced he would form Joe Newman Productions to make Island in the Sky but the film ended up being made by others.

In 1953 Newman set up his own production company, Sabre Productions. Their first productions were to be This Island Earth and Tehran.

Newman directed The Human Jungle (1954) for Allied Artists.

=== Sabre Productions ===
Newman made This Island Earth for Universal. It starred Rex Reason as a scientist and jet pilot who is transported to another world by beings from a dying civilization who secretly intend to invade and take over his home planet. The film attracted a cult following that increased decades later when the television comedy series Mystery Science Theater 3000 spoofed it in 1996 in its first feature-film venture.

Also at Universal he directed Kiss of Fire (1955). He did Flight to Hong Kong (1956) for Sabre, then Death in Small Doses (1957).

Two of actor Joel McCrea's final westerns followed for the director, Fort Massacre (1958) and The Gunfight at Dodge City (1959).

Newman directed The Big Circus (1959) for Irwin Allen at Allied Artists then went to MGM to do Tarzan, the Ape Man (1959).

=== Television ===
Newman went into television directing "Meeting at Appalachia" for Westinghouse Desilu Playhouse and "The High Cost of Fame" for Dan Raven, "The Lady and the Lawyer" for The Asphalt Jungle.

Newman did some films for Allied Artists, The Big Bankroll (1961), and The George Raft Story (1962). In between he made It Started in Tokyo (1961), The Lawbreakers (1961) and A Thunder of Drums (1961).

His final years as a director were for TV, doing episodes of The Great Adventure, The Alfred Hitchcock Hour and The Big Valley. He did several Twilight Zone episodes including "In Praise of Pip", "The Last Night of a Jockey", "Black Leather Jackets", and "The Bewitchin' Pool".

== Partial filmography ==
- Don't Talk (1942) (short film)
- Northwest Rangers (1942)
- Jungle Patrol (1948)
- The Great Dan Patch (a.k.a. Ride a Reckless Mile) (1949)
- Abandoned (1949)
- 711 Ocean Drive (1950)
- The Guy Who Came Back (1951)
- Love Nest (1951)
- I'll Get You for This (a.k.a. Lucky Nick Cain) (1951)
- Pony Soldier (1951)
- Red Skies of Montana (1952)
- The Outcasts of Poker Flat (1952)
- Dangerous Crossing (1953)
- The Human Jungle (1954)
- This Island Earth (1955) (as Joseph Newman)
- Kiss of Fire (1955)
- Flight to Hong Kong (1956)
- Death in Small Doses (1957)
- Fort Massacre (1958)
- The Gunfight at Dodge City (1959)
- The Big Circus (1959)
- Tarzan, the Ape Man (1959)
- A Thunder of Drums (1961)
- Twenty Plus Two (1961)
- The Lawbreakers (1961)
- The Big Bankroll (a.k.a. King of the Roaring 20's: The Story of Arnold Rothstein) (1961)
- The George Raft Story (a.k.a. Spin of a Coin) (1961)
