= The Lawbreakers =

1961 film by Joseph M. Newman

- Theatrical release poster
- Directed by: Joseph M. Newman
- Screenplay by: Paul Monash; W. R. Burnett
- Based on: "The Lady and the Lawyer" episode of the television series The Asphalt Jungle
- Produced by: Jaime del Valle
- Starring: Jack Warden; Vera Miles; Robert Douglas; Arch Johnson
- Edited by: Ben Lewis; Herbert W. Wrench
- Music by: Johnny Mandel
- Distributed by: Metro-Goldwyn-Mayer
- Release date: August 15, 1961 (West Germany)
- Running time: 79 minutes
- Country: United States
- Language: English

The Lawbreakers is a 1961 American neo-noir crime drama film directed by Joseph M. Newman. Made in a film noir style, the crime drama is based on the pilot episode of the 1961 television series The Asphalt Jungle and stars an ensemble cast including Jack Warden, Vera Miles, Robert Douglas, and Arch Johnson.

The film tells the story of a scheme to double-cross the syndicate and steal its money, and of a police commissioner's efforts to investigate homicides that take place as the scheme unfolds while also fighting corruption in the city government and police department.

== Plot ==
Allen Bardeman is a prominent, married lawyer who collects money from the numbers racket for the syndicate. His legal secretary, Angela Walsh, is also his mistress, and he provides her with a house of her own, where Sam Henry – a corrupt New York City administrator who acts as a "bag man" for the syndicate – makes a weekly visit to pick up money from Bardeman. Bardeman's lavish lifestyle and tax problems have placed him deeply in debt. Angela urges him to solve his money problems by staging a robbery of the syndicate's money, using a man he knows will play the role of armed robber for him. She then visits Ed Rackin, a nightclub owner who looks out for the syndicate's local interests and who Henry also visits to collect syndicate numbers proceeds. Their conversation reveals that Bardeman is unaware that they know one another, and that Angela and Rackin are scheming to take Bardeman's money after the staged robbery and run off together.

Bardeman arranges to have the robbery take place at Angela's house during Henry's weekly visit. During the robbery, Henry unexpectedly pulls a gun on the disguised robber, who shoots and mortally wounds Henry. The robber turns out to be Rackin, who drives off in Henry's car with the money and the dying Henry. When the police find Henry's body at the wheel of his car alongside a road soon afterwards, New York Police Department Captain Matthew Gower and his homicide squad launch an investigation into his murder.

Gower is an idealistic and honest cop and outspoken critic of the corruption he finds all around him in the city government and police force. He has faced repeated reprimands and disciplinary action, including a demotion from deputy inspector to captain, at the hands of the corrupt Police Commissioner James Deane, who punishes him when he interferes in syndicate activities. When Mayor Harold Emshaw, facing pressure from the press to clean up the city government and police department, removes Deane from his position, he appoints Gower as acting commissioner, promoting him over the head of his superior, Chief Inspector Gus Honochek. Gower sets about creating a hand-picked team of honest detectives to work directly under him to investigate organized crime activities, including Sergeant Frank Orte and the resentful Honochek.

Gower's men quickly determine that Henry was a syndicate collector, and observe Rackin meeting Joe Selkin, a syndicate troubleshooter, at the airport. They secretly begin to follow Selkin. Selkin visits Bardeman's office, accuses Bardeman of stealing the missing money, and orders him to return it by the following morning. After Selkin leaves, Angela comforts the panicky Bardeman. She urges him to call Rackin and tell him to bring the money to Bardeman; she tells Bardeman to threaten to tell Selkin that Rackin has the money if Rackin does not bring it. Bardeman agrees to make the call. Meanwhile, when word of Selkin's visit to Bardeman reaches Gower, Gower and Orte begin to suspect that Bardeman is a frontman for the syndicate

Rackin visits Bardeman in his law office that evening without bringing the money and pulls a gun on Bardeman. When Bardeman tells Rackin that he has a way of protecting himself from such threats, Rackin shocks him by replying that he knows because Angela told him; it is the first time that Bardeman realizes that Angela and Rackin know one another. Rackin then shoots Bardeman to death and removes the audio tape from a tape recorder in Bardeman's desk drawer that Angela had told him would be making a recording of the encounter. When Angela arrives at the office the following morning, she enters Bardeman's office, sees his body on the floor, checks to make sure the tape is missing, and then collects a second tape recorder that has been running overnight and was hidden under a statue in the office. She then feigns emotional distress and calls the police.

That same morning, Selkin, unaware of Bardeman's death the evening before, calls Rackin and orders him to kill Bardeman for not delivering the stolen money on time. A delighted Rackin agrees, realizing that the syndicate suspects only Bardeman of having stolen its money, and does not tell Selkin that Bardeman already is dead. Immediately afterwards, Honochek brings Selkin in for questioning. Orte reports to Gower that ballistics evidence shows that the same gun killed both Henry and Bardeman, and Gower hypothesizes that someone else was involved in Henry's murder and then killed Bardeman to avoid having to split the money stolen from Henry. When Honochek reports that Selkin had called Rackin that morning, Gower informs Selkin – much to Selkin's surprise – that Bardeman had been murdered the previous evening and orders Selkin held on suspicion of homicide. Deciding that Rackin is the man who can tie together Bardeman's death with syndicate activities, Gower orders Honochek to tail Rackin.

Angela telephones Rackin and plays the second audio tape over the phone to him; it clearly incriminates him in Bardeman's murder. When he expresses gratitude that she found it instead of the police and asks her to erase or destroy it, she informs him that instead she will give the tape to him, but only if he gives her all of the stolen money. They agree to meet at the train station to exchange the tape for the money. Meanwhile, Orte's questioning of Angela's officemates at Bardeman's law firm reveals that she entered his office every morning to retrieve and transcribe audio tapes Bardeman used for dictation, and the tape being missing on the morning Angela found Bardeman's body prompts Gower to order that Angela be brought in for further questioning. Before the police can do so, Honochek, tailing Rackin, telephones Gower to report Angela meeting with Rackin at the train station. Gower and Orte immediately drive to the train station and join up with Honochek.

When Angela meets Rackin, she admits to him that she had been planning all along to double-cross him as well as Bardeman. She orders him to place the money in a locker at the train station, after which she will place the tape in the same locker. Rackin places the money in the locker, and when Angela exchanges the tape for the money, approaches her threateningly. She throws the locker key at him to force him to retrieve it rather than chase her, then runs off and gets into a taxicab, but two of Gower's detectives stop the cab almost immediately and arrest her. At the train station, Rackin gets the tape from the locker, then runs when he sees Gower, Honochek, and Orte approaching. Cornered, he pulls a gun, and Orte fatally shoots him.

Believing that Selkin ordered Rackin to kill Bardeman but unable to prove it with Rackin dead, Gower orders Selkin released. Gower tells Selkin to take word back to the syndicate that with him as police commissioner, organized crime activities were going to become very difficult in the future, and that the syndicate would be wise to pull out of town. Dropping Gower off at his home that evening, Honochek calls Gower "Commissioner" with a smile, demonstrating that Gower has earned his respect as a leader and that he no longer harbors any ill will about Gower's promotion.

== Cast ==
- Jack Warden as Captain/Police Commissioner Matthew Gower
- Vera Miles as Angela Walsh
- Robert Douglas as Allen Bardeman
- Arch Johnson as Chief Inspector Gus Honochek
- Douglas Odney as Sergeant/Lieutenant Frank Orte
- Robert H. Harris as Joe Selkin
- Ken Lynch as Ed Rackin
- Robert Bailey as Sam Henry
- Mary Lawrence as Marian Gower
- James Seay as Mayor Harold Emshaw
- Marianne Stewart as Rose Wardell
- Jay Adler as Abe Hirsch
- John Zaremba as Sergeant John Ervine
- David White as Police Commissioner James Deane

== Background and production ==
In the spring and summer of 1961, ABC broadcast a television series in the United States entitled The Asphalt Jungle. Produced by Metro-Goldwyn-Mayer Television in a film noir style, it was a gritty, hard-boiled police drama starring Jack Warden, Arch Johnson, and William Smith (billed as "Bill Smith") as detectives in the police force of an unnamed city in the Midwestern United States specializing in investigating the activities of organized crime. Although inspired by the acclaimed 1950 film The Asphalt Jungle, which in turn had been based on the 1949 W. R. Burnett novel of the same name, the television series had nothing in common with either the film or the novel other than its title, using new characters and storylines. Premiering on April 2, 1961, it drew mediocre ratings, and ABC cancelled it after airing its thirteenth episode on June 25, 1961.

MGM Television filmed The Asphalt Jungle's pilot episode, "The Lady and the Lawyer", in 1960. ABC aired it as the series' second episode on April 9, 1961. Unlike other episodes of The Asphalt Jungle, it did not include Smith or his Sergeant Danny Keller character as the third featured detective alongside Gower and Honochek, instead featuring Douglas Odney as Sergeant Frank Orte, although it used the series' standard opening credits that included Smith. Anticipating the show's cancellation and deciding to create a theatrical film for distribution in Europe, MGM Television shot an additional 30 minutes of footage using the same cast and crew as "The Lady and the Lawyer." Metro-Goldwyn-Mayer used the additional footage to re-edit and expand "The Lady and the Lawyer" to create The Lawbreakers as a 79-minute theatrical film, which, like "The Lady and the Lawyer," included Odney and his Orte character and did not include Smith or his Keller character. The Lawbreakers was released in Europe and elsewhere in 1961 after the cancellation of The Asphalt Jungle; for example, it was released in August 1961 in West Germany, and it eventually was released on various dates in such countries as Brazil, Finland, Italy, Mexico, and Sweden.

Duke Ellington wrote the theme music for The Asphalt Jungle television series, and it was used in "The Lady and the Lawyer"; music by Johnny Mandel replaced it in The Lawbreakers. Otherwise, production credits for The Lawbreakers were the same as those for "The Lady and the Lawyer".

Intended from the outset for theatrical release in Europe rather than the United States, The Lawbreakers is considerably more violent and risqué than domestic American films of the era and far more so than any episode of The Asphalt Jungle television series. The additional footage shot for the film includes scantily clad prostitutes and showgirls and a striptease performance by a woman on the stage at Rackin's nightclub, which could not have aired on American television in 1961 and probably would not have been included in a domestic American film.

== Legacy and critical response ==
Never released theatrically in the United States, The Lawbreakers has been almost entirely forgotten there and is one of the most obscure of Joseph M. Newman's movies. Apparently, its only showing in the United States was a single broadcast on cable television on Turner Classic Movies over 40 years after its European release. The American Film Institute does not include The Lawbreakers in its Catalog of Feature Films.

In recent years, The Lawbreakers has been exhibited at the Museum of Modern Art in New York City and has received favorable reviews from online film bloggers, who have described it as tightly edited and directed, providing an informative and thorough depiction of the operations of both organized crime and the police, and featuring a surprisingly talented cast of character actors, considering its origin as a television series episode. Vera Miles' performance as a film noir femme fatale and Joseph M. Newman's direction have been singled out for praise.

== See also ==
- List of American films of 1961
