= Twenty Plus Two =

1961 film by Joseph M. Newman

- Directed by: Joseph M. Newman
- Screenplay by: Frank Gruber
- Based on: Twenty Plus Two; 1961 novel by Frank Gruber
- Produced by: Frank Gruber
- Starring: David Janssen; Jeanne Crain; Dina Merrill
- Cinematography: Carl E. Guthrie
- Edited by: George White
- Music by: Gerald Fried
- Production company: Scott R. Dunlap Productions
- Distributed by: Allied Artists Pictures
- Release date: August 13, 1961
- Running time: 102 minutes
- Country: United States
- Language: English

Twenty Plus Two (a.k.a. It Started in Tokyo) is a 1961 American mystery film starring David Janssen, Jeanne Crain, and Dina Merrill. Directed by Joseph M. Newman, the film adapted Frank Gruber's 1961 novel of the same title.

== Plot ==
In 1961, Tom Alder (Janssen) is a private investigator in Los Angeles who specializes in locating lost heirs.

Prompted by a Los Angeles police friend to poke his nose into the murder of a movie star's fan club secretary, he becomes intrigued by its potential connection to the disappearance of a then 16-year-old Doris Delaney, a wealthy young woman who went missing from her New York City school 13 years earlier. In spite of a search that had cost her father three-quarters of a million dollars in 1948, not a clue as to why or where she had gone was ever found.

Following up on his own initiative, he discovers a possible clue linking the murder to the Delaney case that police had missed. It leads him to Leroy Dane, a Hollywood action hero with, it turns out, a suspect World War II hero record.

Alder’s investigation also brings him back into the sphere of teenage flame Linda Foster (Crain), who had sent him a Dear John letter while he was serving in the Korean War. Now divorced and dating a wealthy and influential man, the vixenish 29 year-old is powerfully attracted by Alder and throws herself at him. She is bosom friends with attractive, late-twenties Nikki Kovacs (Merrill), whom Alder just catches a glimpse of.

While on a plane to New York City to pursue the Delaney case still on his own dime, Alder is seated next to Nikki; sensing something familiar about her, he starts a conversation. Later, in his hotel room, he is approached by Frenchy Pleschette, a career conman who's spent half his life in prison. He tries to hire Alder to find his missing younger brother, Auguste, first seeking to lure Alder with a $1,000 bill (and the promise of nine more like it), then at the threat of a gun. Both fail.

Alder interviews the reclusive and suspicious Mrs. Delaney, who asserts she knows her daughter is still alive. She has no proof, only the conviction that Doris would have left some clue to let her know had she died. Initially brusque to Alder she warms up to him as he reveals the sincerity of his interest, and insight into her daughter neither she nor Doris' father had had, either before Doris' disappearance or after.

Linda follows Nikki to Chicago and discovers she is missing. Alder eventually remembers meeting a woman too close to being Kovacs not to be at an escort club in Japan while recuperating from a wartime combat wound. Calling herself Lily Brown, she was sympathetic to Tom's Dear John woe, and alluded to deep troubles of her own, kept just as deeply buried. Putting puzzle pieces together Tom recognizes that she is the missing heiress Doris Delaney, and races to Chicago to pick up her trail.

Alder's investigations establish Dane as the likely killer of his secretary. When Dane also shows up in Chicago Alder baits him that he is close to drawing an even bigger noose tight around his neck.

Both Linda's boyfriend and Nikki's fiancé fly to Chicago, each in pursuit of their woman, and arrive at the same hotel everyone's staying in, and Nikki had disappeared from. The remaining five all awkwardly meet.

Alder heads for the Pleschette family homestead in South Dakota, trailed - as he has been since leaving L.A. - by Frenchy. He gets there first, and discovers a stranded Nikki. She emotionally confesses that she had been raped as a teen by a man who had lured her to his apartment, who later brought a friend to it. Fearing she'd be shared with him as well, she had shot and killed the rapist, then fled in too great a shame to subject her family both to her pregnancy and a murder trial. She lost the child and had ended up a prostitute in Japan.

After Frenchy joins them at the home Dane arrives, who is revealed to be both Auguste Pleschette and Nikki's rapist. He confesses to having operating not merely under a Hollywood stage name but to have killed and stolen the identity of the other man present when Nikki had merely superficially wounded him, an ex-G.I. friend with the wartime experiences Lane has claimed - all precisely as Alder had put together.

In a showdown between the two brothers, Lane announces his intention to kill his three pursuers, sparing only his dottering father. Resolving himself to an extended return to prison, Frenchy guns Lane down before he can shoot. Alder and Nikki resume the romance they had started in Japan. Linda is left to her own devices, just as she had once left her youthful beau.

== Cast ==
- David Janssen as Tom Alder
- Jeanne Crain as Linda Foster
- Dina Merrill as Nicki Kovacs
- Agnes Moorehead as Mrs. Eleanor Delaney
- Brad Dexter as Leroy Dane
- Robert Strauss as Jimmy Honsinger
- Jacques Aubuchon as Jacques Pleschette
- William Demarest as Desmond Slocum
- George N. Neise as Walter Collinson
- Fredd Wayne as Harris Toomey
- Carleton Young as Colonel
- Robert H. Harris as Stanley
- Billy Varga as Mark

== Critical reception ==
Allmovie called it a "talkative but interesting murder mystery."
