= Kiss of Fire (film) =

1955 film by Joseph M. Newman

- Directed by: Joseph M. Newman
- Written by: Jonreed Lauritzen (novel)
- Screenplay by: Franklin Coen; Richard Collins
- Produced by: Samuel Marx
- Starring: Jack Palance; Barbara Rush
- Cinematography: Carl E. Guthrie
- Edited by: Arthur H. Nadel
- Color process: Technicolor
- Production company: Universal International Pictures
- Distributed by: Universal Pictures
- Release dates: September 23, 1955 (New York City); November 1, 1955 (United States)
- Running time: 87 minutes
- Country: United States
- Language: English

Kiss of Fire is a 1955 American Western adventure film directed by Joseph M. Newman and starring Jack Palance and Barbara Rush. Based on the novel "The Rose and the Flame" by Jonreed Lauritzen (Garden City, NY, 1951).

== Plot ==
A noble Spaniard (Jack Palance) escorts a Spanish princess (Barbara Rush) from New Mexico to a ship in California.

== Cast ==
- Jack Palance as El Tigre
- Barbara Rush as Princess Lucia
- Rex Reason as Duke of Montera
- Martha Hyer as Felicia
- Leslie Bradley as Baron Vega
- Alan Reed as Sergeant Diego
- Lawrence Dobkin as Padre Domingo
- Joseph Waring as Victor
- Pat Hogan as Chief Pahvant
- Karen Kadler as Shining Moon
- Steven Geray as Ship Captain Belkin
- Henry Rowland as Acosta

== See also ==
- List of American films of 1955
