= Killing Them Softly =

2012 film by Andrew Dominik

- Theatrical release poster
- Directed by: Andrew Dominik
- Screenplay by: Andrew Dominik
- Based on: Cogan's Trade by George V. Higgins
- Produced by: Brad Pitt; Dede Gardner; Steve Schwartz; Paula Mae Schwartz; Anthony Katagas
- Starring: Brad Pitt; Scoot McNairy; Ben Mendelsohn; Richard Jenkins; James Gandolfini; Ray Liotta; Sam Shepard
- Cinematography: Greig Fraser
- Edited by: Brian A. Kates
- Production companies: Annapurna Pictures; Plan B Entertainment; Chockstone Pictures; 1984 Private Defense Contractors; Metropolitan Films; Cogans Film Holdings, LLC
- Distributed by: The Weinstein Company (North America); Inferno Distribution (International)
- Release dates: May 22, 2012 (Cannes); November 30, 2012 (United States)
- Running time: 97 minutes
- Country: United States
- Language: English
- Budget: $15 million
- Box office: $37.9 million

Killing Them Softly is a 2012 American neo-noir crime film written and directed by Andrew Dominik, and starring Brad Pitt. It is based on George V. Higgins's 1974 novel Cogan's Trade. The story follows Jackie Cogan, a hitman who is hired to deal with the aftermath of a Mafia poker game robbery that ruptured the criminal economy. The events are set during the 2008 United States presidential election and the 2008 financial crisis. Also starring in the film are Scoot McNairy, Ben Mendelsohn, Richard Jenkins, James Gandolfini, Ray Liotta, and Sam Shepard.

On May 22, 2012, the film premiered in competition for the Palme d'Or at the 2012 Cannes Film Festival and received positive early reviews. Killing Them Softly was released on November 30, 2012, domestically by the Weinstein Company and internationally by Inferno Distribution, to mostly positive reviews. It grossed $37.9 million against a budget of $15 million.

== Plot ==
During the 2008 financial crisis and 2008 United States presidential election, Johnny "Squirrel" Amato plans to rob a Mafia-controlled private poker game in Boston. He enlists Frankie, a former business associate, and Russell, a heroin-addicted Australian immigrant who steals purebred dogs to sell in Florida. They target a game run by Markie Trattman, who is known to have previously orchestrated an inside job by paying two men to rob his own illegal poker game. Squirrel anticipates that Markie will be the obvious suspect, and the crime syndicate Markie is involved with will simply have him killed without investigating further. Though obviously inexperienced, Frankie and Russell successfully carry out the armed robbery, and escape with approximately $100,000.

“The Driver”, a mob lawyer who reports to the group running the crime syndicate, discusses with hitman Jackie Cogan on how to deal with the situation created by the robbery: mob-operated poker games have stopped as players fear more violence, throwing the underground criminal economy into chaos. Although Jackie correctly intuits Markie was innocent, he believes Markie needs to die regardless, as if no example is made it would encourage further robberies by street level thugs. Driver pushes back strongly on having Markie murdered and Jackie reluctantly agrees to only having him beaten.

Meanwhile, Russell travels to Florida with a man named Kenny Gill to sell the stolen dogs. While trying to recruit Kenny as a drug dealer, Russell inadvertently reveals his involvement in the heist. Kenny, being acquainted with a hitman named Dillon who knows both Jackie and Driver, informs Dillon that Russell, Frankie, and Squirrel are the perpetrators. Jackie finally convinces Driver that Markie must die, and with Kenny driving, Jackie kills Markie from the rear seat of the car.

Three targets remain: Russell, Frankie, and Squirrel, but Jackie is reluctant to take the hit on Squirrel, as he and Jackie are acquainted. Jackie convinces Driver to bring in another hitman, Mickey Fallon, of whom Jackie speaks highly. While explaining why he wants to hire Mickey, Jackie explains to Driver his philosophy of "killing them softly", killing his targets from a distance or in ways which allow them no chance to experience fear, despair or suffering of any kind.

Mickey, holed up in an expensive hotel room, indulges in binge drinking and sex with prostitutes instead of carrying out the hit. Admitting to Jackie how he violated his parole to be out of state, Jackie arranges Mickey's arrest and extradition back to New York, deciding to kill Squirrel himself.

Before Jackie gets to him, Russell is arrested on a drug possession charge. Meanwhile, Jackie confronts Frankie and convinces him to trade Squirrel's whereabouts for his life. Jackie has Frankie drive him to where Squirrel will have his regular rendezvous with a woman, and he kills Squirrel with a shotgun. After confirming Squirrel is dead, Jackie and Frankie drive to the parking garage where Jackie shoots Frankie in the head without warning. Jackie wipes down the car and leaves the scene.

On the night of the presidential election, Jackie meets with Driver to collect his fee for the three hits. On the TV in the bar, Barack Obama is giving his election victory speech. The two argue over his fee, with Driver trying to pay a lesser amount. Jackie mocks Obama's words on community, declaring that America "is just a business", and demands the full sum.

== Cast ==
- Brad Pitt as Jackie Cogan
- Scoot McNairy as Frankie
- Ben Mendelsohn as Russell
- James Gandolfini as Mickey Fallon
- Richard Jenkins as Driver
- Vincent Curatola as Johnny “Squirrel” Amato
- Ray Liotta as Markie Trattman
- Trevor Long as Stevie Caprio
- Max Casella as Barry Caprio
- Sam Shepard as Dillon
- Slaine as Kenny Gill

== Production ==
Killing Them Softly is based on the 1974 novel Cogan's Trade by George V. Higgins. Cogan's Trade, like Higgins' other novels, takes place in Boston; although filmed in the New Orleans area, characters in Killing Them Softly make several references to Boston area suburbs from the original novel. The film was written and directed by Andrew Dominik, who chose to update the setting of the story, saying "as I started adapting it, it was the story of an economic crisis, and it was an economic crisis in an economy that was funded by gambling—and the crisis occurred due to a failure in regulation. It just seemed to have something that you couldn't ignore."

The project was first announced in November 2010, when Brad Pitt was reported to be in talks to star in it. Dominik asked Pitt if he was interested in a role via a text message; he replied "yes" and the matter was settled over half an hour. Pitt previously co-starred in Dominik's The Assassination of Jesse James by the Coward Robert Ford (2007). Production was scheduled to begin in Louisiana in March 2011, with pre-production beginning in January. Additional roles were cast in early 2011.

According to Garret Dillahunt, the film's first cut was two-and-a-half hours long. Dillahunt, who had a cameo in the film, did not make the final cut for the theatrical release.

The music in the film is primarily taken from pop, rock and R&B songs from many artists and decades, with the exception of one original song, "The Feeling in My Nuts", by Marc Streitenfeld, which James Christopher Monger of AllMusic said matched the film's "idiosyncratic nature". Rachel Fox supervised the song implementation. A soundtrack album was sold containing most of the songs heard in the film, and substituting some instrumental versions which were not heard. The song "Windmills of Your Mind", sung by Petula Clark, was in the film but not included on the soundtrack album.

== Release ==
Killing Them Softly premiered at the 65th Cannes Film Festival on May 22, 2012, where it was selected to be "In Competition" for the Palme D'Or. The film was scheduled to be released in the United States on September 21, 2012; however it was delayed until November 30, 2012, to avoid competing with The Master and to improve its chances for award nominations. The film kept its original release date in other parts of the world, with the somewhat unusual result that it opened in the UK and India more than two months before the US opening.

The Weinstein Company distributed the film theatrically in the U.S. and Canada, while Inferno Distribution released internationally.

=== Home media ===
Killing Them Softly was released by The Weinstein Company Home Entertainment and Anchor Bay Entertainment on Blu-ray & DVD March 26, 2013. The film was released in Australia earlier, on February 13, and on February 25 in the UK.

== Reception ==
=== Box office ===
In its opening weekend, Killing Them Softly grossed $6.8 million. The film made $15 million domestically and $22.9 million internationally for a worldwide total of $37.9 million.

=== Critical response ===
On Rotten Tomatoes the film has an approval rating of 74% based on 234 reviews, with an average rating of 6.90/10. The site's critical consensus reads: "Killing Them Softly is a darkly comic, visceral thriller that doubles as a cautionary tale on capitalism, whose message is delivered with sledgehammer force." On Metacritic, the film received a weighted average score of 64 out of 100, based on 42 critics indicating "generally favorable" reviews. Audiences polled by CinemaScore gave the film a rare average grade of "F" on an A+ to F scale.

Peter Bradshaw of The Guardian gave Killing them Softly 5 stars, saying the film is a "compelling comment on economic bloodletting in the real world". Tim Robey of The Daily Telegraph gave the film 4 stars describing it as "bleakly electrifying". Total Film awarded it 3 stars calling it "tough, stylish, violent and studded with stars" but countered that it "doesn’t quite get the job done". Roger Ebert gave the film 2 stars out of 4, calling it "a dismal, dreary series of cruel and painful murders" cast in a similarly "dreary and joyless cityscape". He also found the performances dependent mostly on the actors' established screen presences while pointing out improbabilities in the plot, such as how the mafia manages to support itself without crimes involving civilians: "Like a captive animal struggling to free itself from a trap, they seem reduced to gnawing off their own legs."
