= Arch Johnson =

American actor (1922–1997)

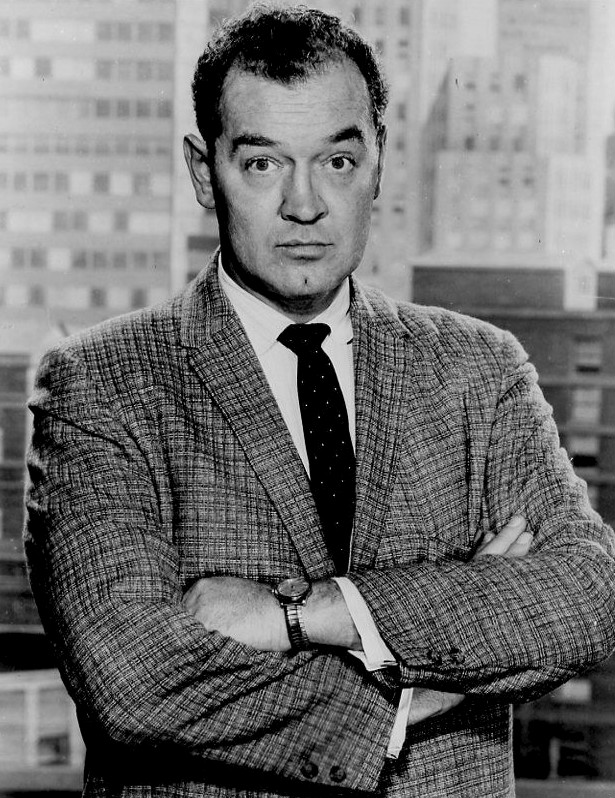
- Johnson in 1961
- Born: Archibald Winchester Johnson; March 14, 1922; Minneapolis, Minnesota, U.S.
- Died: October 9, 1997 (aged 75); Berlin, Maryland, U.S.
- Occupations: Stage, film and television actor
- Years active: 1953–1990
- Spouse(s): Yvonne Saccard (1957–1966; divorced; two children); Eleanor M. Willey (1969–1971; divorced); Joyce Johnson (unknown–1981; divorced; three children); Jean D. Heibeck (1994–1997, his death)

Archibald Winchester "Arch" Johnson (March 14, 1922 – October 9, 1997) was an American actor who appeared on Broadway and in more than 100 television programs.

== Early years ==
Archibald Winchester Johnson was born in Minnesota in 1922. He served in the United States Marine Corps in the Pacific Theater of World War II. Johnson attended the University of Pennsylvania.

== Career ==
Starting out in Philadelphia in the 1940s through 1950s, Johnson worked in community theater both as an actor and director. He began acting with the Plays and Players Theatre in Philadelphia and was part of the world premiere of Stalag 17 while there. After he left Philadelphia, he studied for two years at the Neighborhood Playhouse School of the Theatre in New York.

A stage actor as well and a prolific television character actor, he was in the original production of West Side Story (1957) on Broadway and the revival of that show in 1980, again on Broadway. He was the only actor from the original stage version who returned for the revival, and he toured Europe with the show. He was in the original version of Other People's Money on Broadway and originated the Role of "Jorge" that Gregory Peck played in the film version.

Johnson had a long and varied career in television. Among his numerous roles, he was a regular on the 1961 series The Asphalt Jungle as police Captain Gus Honochek, on the 1955-1956 comedy series It's Always Jan, on the 1960-1961 comedy series Peter Loves Mary, and on the 1965–1966 series Camp Runamuck as Commander Wivenhoe.

In 1963, he portrayed the role of Harry Johanson in the episode "Incident at Paradise" on CBS's Rawhide. He made five appearances on Perry Mason, including the role of murder victim Karl Magovern in the 1961 episode "The Case of the Travelling Treasure", as murder victim Gerald Thornton in the 1963 episode, "The Case of the Golden Oranges", and as Marvin Fremont in the 1964 episode, "The Case of the Ice-Cold Hands". He played John Ruskin in the 1960 episode "The Case of the Singular Double". He made four appearances on Daniel Boone and Gunsmoke, five on Bewitched, four on The F.B.I., and scores of others on many other television offerings, including The Twilight Zone, Decoy, Johnny Ringo, Hennesey, The Big Valley, Zane Grey Theater, Gunsmoke, Bat Masterson, The Roaring 20s, Lawman, Going My Way, Mr. Novak, and Empire and its successor series, Redigo, both with Richard Egan.

In 1963, Johnson appeared on NBC's Western series Laramie as the outlaw Sam Wellman in the episode "No Place to Run". In the story line, Wellman forces a likeable safecracker who is trying to go straight, Gandy Ross, portrayed by Don Durant, formerly Johnny Ringo, to open the safe in the bank at fictitious Granite City. Ellen Burstyn and Tom Skerritt play the roles of Amy and Price in the episode, as Jess Harper rescues his friend Ross from the clutches of Wellman.

In 1961, Johnson appeared as his Gus Honochek character from The Asphalt Jungle in the theatrical film The Lawbreakers. In 1973, Johnson played the part of Combs in the movie The Sting.

Later in life, Johnson tutored in literacy programs in Westover, Maryland. He also worked with an Alternatives to Violence program with the Religious Society of Friends.

== Personal life and death ==
Johnson married Jean. They had five children. After retiring, Johnson moved to the Eastern Shore of Maryland.

Johnson died of cancer on October 9, 1997, at Atlantic General Hospital in Berlin, Maryland.

== Filmography ==
Year	Title	Role	Notes
1953	Niagara	Taxi Driver	Uncredited
1954	Garden of Eden		
1956	Somebody Up There Likes Me	Heldon	
1957	Gun Glory	Gunn	
1960	Alfred Hitchcock Presents	Jaime McMahon	Season 5 Episode 25: "The Little Man Who Was There"
1960	Alfred Hitchcock Presents	Heywood Miller	Season 5 Episode 33: "Party Line"
1960	Alfred Hitchcock Presents	Bart McCormick	Season 6 Episode 7: "Outlaw in Town"
1960	G.I. Blues	Sergeant McGraw	
1960	Bat Masterson	Mr. Smith	"The Big Gamble" S2E35
1961	The Explosive Generation	Mr. George Sommers	
1961	The Lawbreakers	Chief Inspector Gus Honochek	
1961	Rawhide	James Cronin	S3:E16, "Incident on the Road Back"
1962	Gunsmoke	Feester	"Wagon Girls" (S7E27)
1962	The Twilight Zone	Jesse James	Episode "Showdown with Rance McGrew"
1962-1967	Bonanza	Gavin / E.J. Butler / A.Z. Wheelock	3 episodes
1963	The Virginian	as Dr. Ashley	Episode "A Killer in Town"
1963	The Lieutenant	as Commander Harry Engstrom	Episode "Interlude"
1963	Twilight of Honor	Mac McWade	
1964	The Munsters	Mr. Taggert	Episode "Tin-Can Man" (Nov 1964)
1964	Gunsmoke	Big Jim Ponder	"Hammerhead" (Dec 1964)
1966	The Monkees	as General Harley Vandenberg	S1:E9, "The Chaperone"
1966	The Fugitive	Sheriff Prycer	Episode "The Last Oasis"
1968	The Invaders	Father Paul	S2:E23, "The Miracle"
1968-1971	Bewitched	Bo Callahan / Harlan Mossler / Bo Braddock / John Harrison / Rudolph Kosko	5 episodes
1970	The Liberation of L.B. Jones	Stanley Bumpas	
1970	The Cheyenne Social Club	Marshal Anderson	
1972	Napoleon and Samantha	Chief of Police	
1973	Walking Tall	Buel Jaggers	
1973	Gentle Savage	Beaumont	
1973	The Sting	Vince Combs	
1975	Rafferty and the Gold Dust Twins	Smitty	
1975	The Hindenburg	Captain B.F. Farley, N.Y.P.D.	Uncredited
1976	The Bionic Woman	Sam Hart	S2:E11 & 12 "Jaime's Shield"
1977	Wonder Woman / The New Adventures of Wonder Woman	General Zachary Kane / John Kelly	2 Episodes: "Judgment from Outer Space" (credited as Archie Johnson) & "Knockout"
1978	The Buddy Holly Story	Mr. Lawrence Holly	
1983	Easy Money	Vendor at Armory	
1985	Death Mask	Dr. Robert Riordan	
