= Buried Loot =

1935 film directed by George B. Seitz

- Prison scene of actors Al Hill (left) and Robert Taylor
- Directed by: George B. Seitz
- Written by: Marty Brooks (story); George B. Seitz (screenplay)
- Produced by: Jack Chertok
- Starring: Robert Taylor
- Music by: William Axt
- Production company: Metro-Goldwyn-Mayer
- Distributed by: Metro-Goldwyn-Mayer
- Release date: January 19, 1935
- Running time: 19 minutes
- Country: United States
- Language: English

Buried Loot is a 1935 American crime film, the first installment of 50 shorts in the Crime Does Not Pay series produced by Metro-Goldwyn-Mayer and released to theaters between 1935 and 1947. Directed by George B. Seitz, Buried Loot stars Robert Taylor in his first leading role for MGM, although he and the rest of the cast and crew are uncredited during the film's presentation.

== Plot ==
The film's story is a contemporary one, set in New York City in the 1930s. It recounts the crime of Al Douglas (Robert Taylor), a bank employee who embezzles $200,000 ($4,697,000 today) from the city's Seacoast National Bank. He then carries out his plan to confess his deed to the bank's president, telling him that he has squandered all the money, mostly through reckless gambling. In reality, though, Douglas has not spent any of the cash; he buried it in a suitcase at a remote spot "across the river in Jersey". As part of his plan too, Douglas quite willingly goes to prison after his trial and conviction for grand larceny. There he intends to be a model inmate and expects to serve only the minimum term of his five-to-ten-year sentence. Upon his release, he will then retrieve the hidden loot and enjoy a rich lifestyle.

Once Douglas is in prison his resolve to stay there, even for the minimum term, begins to wane. His cellmate Louie (Al Hill) continues to talk about how things always change while people are behind bars and how outside prison "nothing stays put". Such comments cause Douglas to worry that someone will find his ill-gotten treasure, so he agrees to participate in Louie's scheme to sneak out of prison by disguising themselves as a priest and as another regular visitor. The scheme succeeds and the two men escape.

Following their getaway, the former cellmates separate to make it harder for authorities to track them. Louie goes to an undisclosed location in New York while Douglas flees to Canada, knowing that he would be easily recognized in the United States and might be followed if he tried to dig up his buried loot too soon after his escape. In Toronto, Douglas decides to alter his physical appearance permanently before returning to New Jersey. He stages an accident and deliberately burns his face with nitric acid. His self-inflicted burns prove to be so severe that he is hospitalized and has to undergo extensive surgeries, which leave his face horribly scarred from skin grafts and numerous stitches. Now confident that he will not be recognized in the United States, Douglas leaves Canada after his release from the hospital and retrieves the suitcase, still full of money. He then proceeds to New York City to book passage on a ship to Europe.

Al Douglas following his surgeries and recovery from severe acid burns

In New York, while walking along a street with his suitcase, Douglas is spotted by two men he had befriended in Canada. The two are the same friends who had taken him to the hospital after his burn injuries and had visited him during his recovery. They invite him to share a taxi ride. He declines, but they cheerfully insist, and he goes with them. The taxi soon stops in front of the Seacoast National Bank, his former employer. Now quite nervous, Douglas refuses to go into the building, so his friends suddenly put handcuffs on him, take his suitcase, and escort him at gunpoint to the office of the bank's president. Douglas is surprised to see Louie there, along with other men. The bank president now informs Douglas that his escape from prison had been an elaborate ruse, that he was allowed to escape. He also tells Douglas that officials for the bank's bonding company never believed his claim that he had spent all of the stolen cash, so in an effort to recover the money the company had organized his escape and had its agents follow him constantly since then. Those agents included some prison staff, his Canadian "friends", and even Louie. The film ends with the disfigured Douglas staring at the camera as he is being told he will now return to prison to serve his maximum sentence with no hope for early parole.

== Cast ==
- Robert Taylor as Al Douglas
- Al Hill as Louie Rattig
- Richard Tucker as Bank President
- George Irving as Edward Swain
- Robert Livingston as Bob
- Brooks Benedict as Man in Getaway Car
- James Ellison as Detective
- Frank O'Connor as Court Clerk
- Shirley Ross as Girl in Canadian Apartment
- Henry Otho as Prison Guard
- Monte Vandergrift as "Death House" Guard

== Production and premiere ==
Five years before the release of Buried Loot, MGM produced the feature-length prison drama The Big House and staged the film on huge sets constructed by studio crews, who had meticulously reproduced the cellblocks, mess hall, and high-walled prison yard of San Quentin State Prison in California. MGM recycled some of the footage shot on those sets for The Big House and used it in Buried Loot for scenes depicting Al Douglas in prison.

MGM released Buried Loot to theaters on January 19, 1935, but five days earlier the studio had arranged a special presentation of the film for law enforcement officials in Baltimore, Maryland. Motion Picture Daily, an entertainment trade publication in New York, reported on that premiere:

BALTIMORE, Jan. 14—"Buried Loot," first release in M-G-M's "Crime Does Not Pay" series produced in conjunction with the Department of Justice, had its premiere in Central Police Court here today. Federal, state, and city officials as well as crime authorities attended. The film is getting its first showing in a theatre in the United States at Loew's Century. Al Feinman of the M-G-M home office helped arrange the screening.
