= The Guy Who Came Back =

1951 film

- Theatrical releaseposter
- Directed by: Joseph M. Newman
- Screenplay by: Allan Scott
- Story by: William Fay
- Produced by: Julian Blaustein
- Starring: Paul Douglas; Joan Bennett
- Cinematography: Joseph LaShelle
- Edited by: William B. Murphy
- Music by: Leigh Harline
- Distributed by: Twentieth Century-Fox
- Release date: August 16, 1951
- Running time: 91 minutes
- Country: United States
- Language: English

The Guy Who Came Back is a 1951 film directed by Joseph M. Newman, produced by Julian Blaustein and starring Paul Douglas, Joan Bennett, and Linda Darnell. The screenplay was written by Allan Scott based on a story by William Fay. The film was distributed by Twentieth Century-Fox.

== Plot ==
Injured and unfit, "Hurricane" Harry Joplin is unhappy about his rejection by both the Navy and his football team. The team suggests that he become a coach, but Harry refuses to believe that his playing days are finished.

Harry's wife Kathy supports the family and Harry spends time with his son Willie, teaching him football. While battling his depression, Harry becomes attracted to Dee Shane, who persuades him to become an entertainer, reciting his old football stories on stage. Harry's attempt to take the stage flops before a large audience, causing him to begin a three-day drinking binge.

Kathy begins seeing another man named Gordon, and it appears that Harry has lost her. He tries wrestling to earn a living, but he lacks passion for it. His old football coach gives Harry one last shot in an important game against the Navy, but he plays poorly and is benched. Harry asks to remain on the sideline for the sake of his son in the bleachers. When the war-depleted team is exhausted of healthy bodies, Harry is needed again and scores a touchdown.

Delighted to win the game and his wife back, Harry is willing to accept a coaching job. Before he can take the job, an admiral who saw the football game offers to accept him into the Navy.

== Cast ==
- Paul Douglas as Harry Joplin
- Linda Darnell as Dee Shane
- Joan Bennett as Kathy Joplin
- Don DeFore as Gordon Towne

== Reception ==
In a contemporary review for The New York Times, critic A. H. Weiler wrote: "Twentieth Century-Fox is rushing the season with 'The Guy Who Came Back' ... Although it is concerned with a football player and football weather, it is not a brisk business. For truth of the matter is, this saga of an aging gridiron great who refuses to believe his star has waned only has the attributes of a varsity cast and the disadvantages of some amateur plotting. The fate of Harry Joplin, its hero, is, despite some snappy dialogue, a fairly obvious affair. And, sadly enough, one is only mildly intrigued, not entranced, by his case history."

== See also ==
- List of American football films
