= Death in Small Doses (1957 film) =

1957 film by Joseph M. Newman

- Directed by: Joseph M. Newman
- Screenplay by: John McGreevey
- Based on: Saturday Evening Post article by Arthur L. Davis
- Produced by: Richard V. Heermance (as Richard Heermance)
- Starring: Peter Graves; Mala Powers
- Cinematography: Carl E. Guthrie (as Carl Guthrie)
- Edited by: William Austin
- Music by: Robert Wiley Miller; Emil Newman
- Production company: Allied Artists Pictures
- Distributed by: Allied Artists Pictures
- Release date: September 15, 1957
- Running time: 79 minutes
- Country: United States
- Language: English

Death in Small Doses is a 1957 American film noir crime film directed by Joseph M. Newman and starring Peter Graves and Mala Powers. A government agent investigates the use of illegal amphetamines among long-haul truck drivers.

== Plot ==
A federal investigator (Peter Graves) poses as a truck driver to check pep-pill usage by long-haul truckers.

== Cast ==
- Peter Graves as Tom Kaylor
- Mala Powers as Val Owens
- Chuck Connors as Mink Reynolds
- Merry Anders as Amy Phillips
- Roy Engel as Wally Morse
- Robert B. Williams as Dunc Clayton (as Robert Williams)
- Harry Lauter as Steve Hummel
- Pete Kooy as Payson
- Robert Christopher as Lennie Owens

== Production ==
Allied Artists bought the rights to the story in August 1956.

Filming started 10 April 1957.
