= Don't Talk (film) =

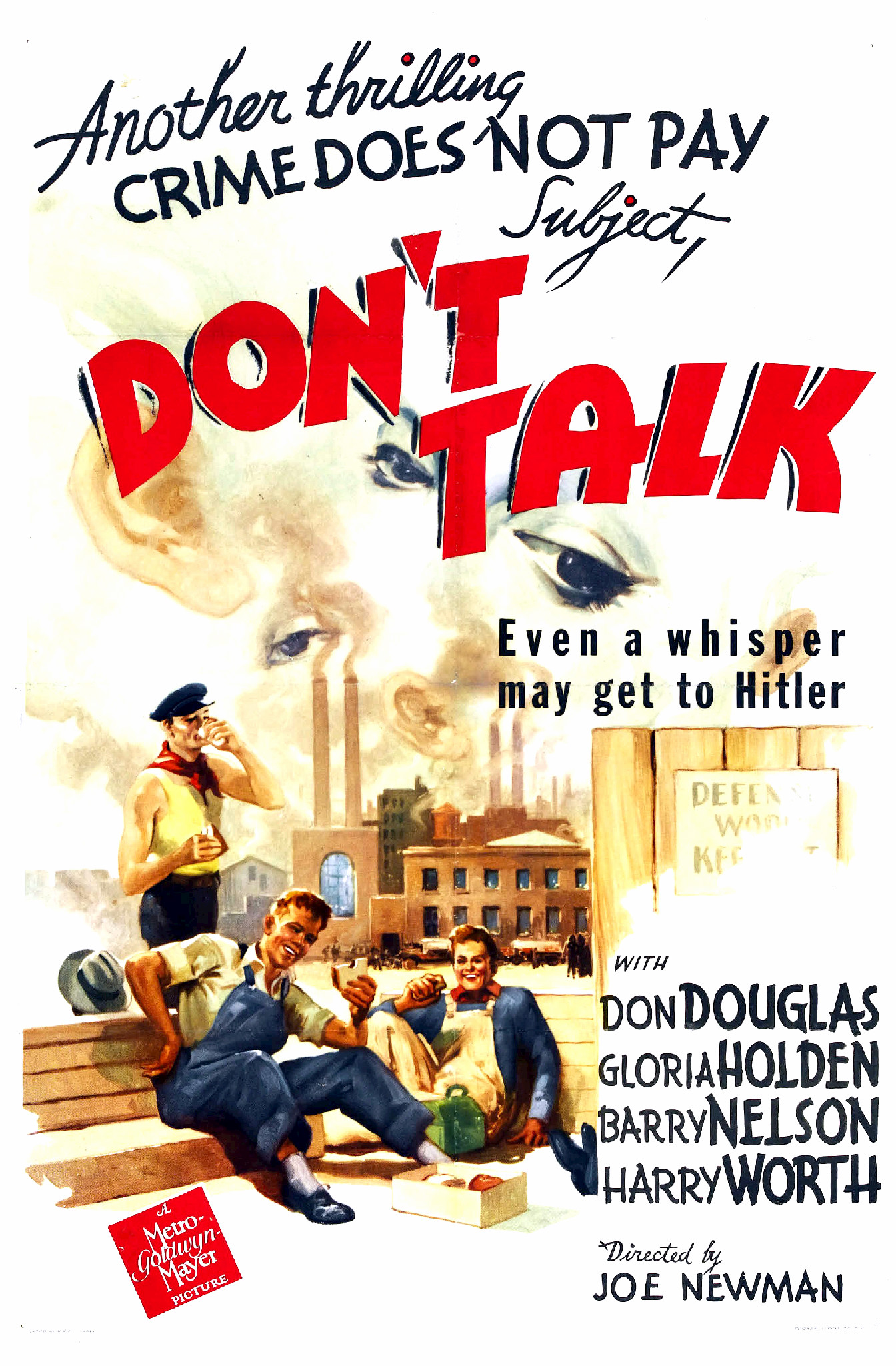
- Film poster
- Directed by: Joe Newman
- Written by: Alan Friedman
- Starring: Don Douglas; Gloria Holden; Barry Nelson; Harry Worth
- Cinematography: Jackson Rose, A.S.C.
- Edited by: Harry Komer
- Distributed by: Metro-Goldwyn-Mayer
- Release date: February 28, 1942
- Running time: 22 minutes
- Country: United States
- Language: English

Don't Talk is a 1942 American short propaganda film, produced for Metro-Goldwyn-Mayer's Crime Does Not Pay series, about the dangers of homefront espionage in wartime. It was nominated for an Academy Award at the 15th Academy Awards for Academy Award for Best Short Subject (Two-reel).

== Plot summary ==
German spy Beulah is posing as a cafe waitress near a depot for trucks delivering war material. She listens to the truckers' conversations and reports to her superior Otto, who is posing as Anatole, manager of a beauty salon.

== Cast ==
- Don Douglas as FBI Agent Jack Sampson
- Gloria Holden as Beulah Anderson, spy posing as cafe waitress
- Barry Nelson as FBI Agent Freed
- Harry Worth as spy chief Otto a/k/a Anatole

Uncredited (in order of appearance)
Matt McHugh	tool works employee questioned regarding the manganese explosion
Harry Wilson	tool works employee questioned regarding the manganese explosion
Barbara Bedford	beauty shop customer
Arthur Space	Griff, who committed the sabotage
Jack Richardson	spy in back room of beauty parlor
William Tannen	FBI agent watching Beulah the waitress-spy at the Elite Cafe
James Warren	FBI technician examining bullet hole in truck engine
Dwight Frye	Ziggy, one of the spies
George Magrill	guard at truck loading dock
Robert Elliott	detective at truck loading dock
Margaret Bert	cafe customer, wife of Mike, truck loader hurt by crate pushed onto his arm
James Millican	FBI agent driving the car following Beulah
Edward Hearn	police sergeant driving to help the FBI agents

== See also ==
- List of Allied propaganda films of World War II
