= The Asphalt Jungle (TV series) =

- Genre: Police procedural
- Starring: Jack Warden; Arch Johnson; Bill Smith
- Composer: Duke Ellington
- Country of origin: United States
- Original language: English
- No. of seasons: 1
- No. of episodes: 13

Production
- Producers: Arthur Lewis; Mel Epstein; Jaime del Valle
- Running time: 60 minutes
- Production company: Metro-Goldwyn-Mayer Television

Original release
- Network: ABC
- Release: April 2 – June 25, 1961

The Asphalt Jungle is a 1961 American police procedural television series starring Jack Warden, Arch Johnson, and Bill Smith about a squad of detectives targeting organized crime in the Midwestern United States. Inspired by the 1950 film The Asphalt Jungle, it aired from April 2 to June 25, 1961, on ABC, followed by reruns until September 24, 1961.

The Asphalt Jungle's pilot episode was re-edited and lengthened to create the 1961 theatrical film The Lawbreakers.

== Synopsis ==
The police department's Metropolitan Squad specializes in fighting organized crime in an unnamed Midwestern city. The squad's members are elite detectives led by Captain Gus Honochek and Sergeant Danny Keller. They report to Deputy Police Commissioner Matthew Gower. Many of their assignments involve going undercover, and Gower himself joins Honochek, Keller, and their squad in undercover work when the situation calls for it.

== Cast ==
- Jack Warden as Deputy Police Commissioner Matthew Gower
- Arch Johnson as Captain Gus Honochek
- Bill Smith as Sergeant Danny Keller

The cast of The Asphalt Jungle: Left to right, Arch Johnson as Captain Gus Honochek, Jack Warden as Deputy Police Commissioner Matthew Gower, and Bill Smith as Sergeant Danny Keller

== Production ==
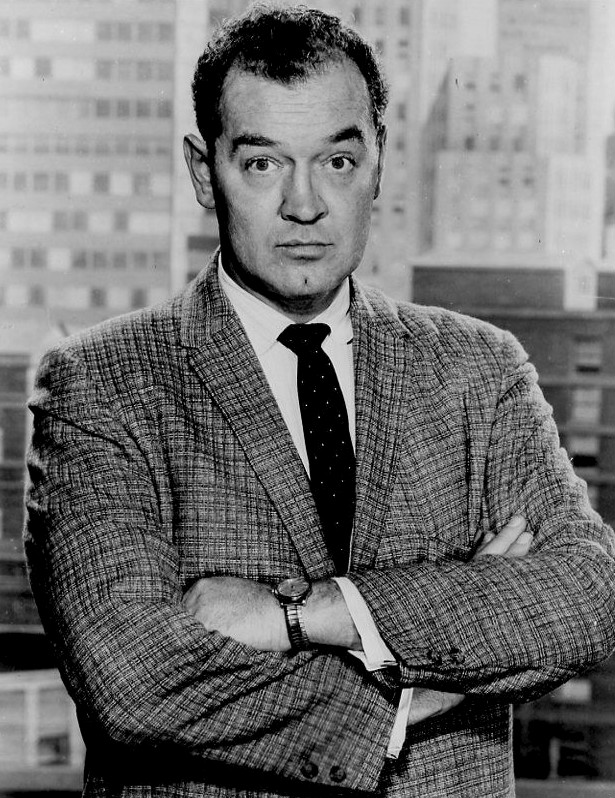
Arch Johnson in The Asphalt Jungle (1961)

The Asphalt Jungle was a gritty crime drama inspired by the 1950 film The Asphalt Jungle, which in turn was based on the 1949 novel The Asphalt Jungle by W. R. Burnett. The television series, however, had nothing in common with the novel or film other than its title – with the partial exception of the episode "The Professor," the plot of which reflects elements of the film.

Arthur Lewis, Mel Epstein, and Jaime del Valle produced episodes of the series, and Herman Hoffman, Gerald Mayer, and Joseph M. Newman directed the episodes. Burnett received a writing credit for each of the 13 episodes, and the other writers credited were George Bellak, Alvin Boretz, Steve Gethers, Abram S. Ginnes, John Huston, Ben Maddow, Paul Monash, E. Jack Neuman, Joseph Petracca, Adrian Spies, Peter Stone, Leon Tokatyan, Carey Wilber, and James Yaffe. Duke Ellington composed the show's music. The television series was a Metro-Goldwyn-Mayer Television production and was filmed in black-and-white.

MGM Television filmed the pilot episode of The Asphalt Jungle, entitled "The Lady and the Lawyer", in 1960. It did not include Bill Smith or his Sergeant Danny Keller character; instead, the detective featured alongside Gower and Honochek was Sergeant Frank Orte, portrayed by Douglas Odney. For the rest of the series, Odney's Orte character was dropped, replaced by Smith's Keller character. ABC broadcast "The Lady and the Lawyer" on April 9, 1961, as the second episode of the series with the standard opening credits including Smith, although he does not appear in the episode, and Odney as Frank Orte credited in the closing credits.

After the cancellation of The Asphalt Jungle, "The Lady and the Lawyer" was re-edited and expanded to create the 79-minute 1961 theatrical film The Lawbreakers. Like "The Lady and the Lawyer," The Lawbreakers does not include Smith or his Keller character, so he is not credited in the film. David White, who portrays Police Commissioner James Deane in The Lawbreakers, also is credited for the role in the closing credits of "The Lady and the Lawyer", although neither he nor his Deane character appear in the television episode. At the end of The Lawbreakers, Gower, a captain at the beginning of the film, is promoted to commissioner, not merely deputy commissioner.

== Broadcast history ==
The Asphalt Jungle premiered on ABC on April 2, 1961. It had mediocre ratings and was cancelled after the broadcast of its 13th episode on June 25, 1961. It aired on Sunday at 9:30 pm throughout its run.

ABC aired reruns of The Asphalt Jungle in its regular time slot from July 2 to September 24, 1961.

== Episodes ==
Season #	Episode #	Title	Plot notes	Original air date
1	1	"The Burglary Ring"	Keller works with Lieutenant Jim Jensen of the burglary squad to apprehend an efficient five-man burglary ring run by a former British Army officer – a self-styled colonel – who plans his crimes meticulously, times and drills his four hand-picked accomplices thoroughly, and makes their thefts look like inside jobs. As the case unfolds, Jensen proves to be dedicated, but incompetent, and Gower must decide whether to retire him. James Westerfield, John Harmon, Eric Berry, Warren Kemmerling, Frank Ferguson, Terry Becker, William Keene, Warren Parker, Joe Turkel, Linda Watkins, Paul Genge, John Duke, George Kennedy, and Will J. White guest-star.	April 2, 1961
1	2	"The Lady and the Lawyer"	City employee Sam Henry is murdered, and Allen Bardeman, an attorney who enjoys fast living with his secretary, Angela Walsh, becomes the prime suspect in the killing when Gower's investigation reveals that Henry was involved in organized crime with Bardeman. Despite being credited (as "Bill Smith") in the title sequence, William Smith does not appear in this episode and is not listed in the closing credits. Vera Miles, Robert Douglas, Ken Lynch, Douglas Odney, Robert H. Harris, Robert Bailey, and Mary Lawrence guest-star. This episode was the pilot for the series, and later was edited and expanded to create the 79-minute 1961 theatrical film The Lawbreakers. David White, credited as portraying Police Commissioner James Deane in the episode, does not appear in "The Lady and the Lawyer", but does portray Deane in The Lawbreakers.	April 9, 1961
1	3	"The Friendly Gesture"	Evidence suggests that Honochek's friend Lou Gordon is connected with a crime ring that steals traveler's checks, but Honochek finds this hard to believe, and risks his job to try to exonerate Gordon. Milton Selzer, Maxine Stuart, and George Kennedy guest-star.	April 16, 1961
1	4	"The Gomez Affair"	After a policeman is killed in a gun battle with small-time criminal Joey Minor, who is wounded in the exchange of fire, Gower's search for Minor leads to a local hospital, where someone has stolen medical supplies and Minor's ex-girlfriend Teresa Gomez works as a nurse. Gower and his men come up with a plan to use Gomez to catch Minor. Everett Sloane, Ellen Madison, Paul Carr, and Emile Meyer guest-star.	April 23, 1961
1	5	"The Sniper"	After police surround a "lover's lane" area in which a sniper has wounded six young girls, a man named Lonnie Peterson comes to Gower and Honochek bearing a rifle and claiming to be the culprit, but they suspect that Peterson is lying about his involvement. Leo Penn, Michael Parks, Suzi Carnell, and Virginia Christine guest-star.	April 30, 1961
1	6	"The Last Way Out"	Gower and Honochek discover two women who are Richie Ashmond's former romantic partners – the head of a bookmaking syndicate whom the police previously have investigated without success – and who know a lot about his life. John Ireland and Arthur Batanides guest-star.	May 7, 1961
1	7	"The McMasters Story"	After two men shoot reformed criminal and former gangster David McMasters to death, organized crime is assumed to be responsible, but Gower discovers that McMasters left a large inheritance to his daughter Norma and begins to suspect that she may be involved in his murder. Edward Binns, Erin O'Brien, Abraham Sofaer, and Malcolm Atterbury guest-star.	May 14, 1961
1	8	"The Nine-Twenty Hero"	After Detective Bill Dyer single-handedly wins a gun battle with four armed criminals and is cited for heroism, he suddenly goes berserk and shoots a fellow police officer. Skip Homeier, Beverly Garland, and Steve Brodie guest-star.	May 21, 1961
1	9	"The Professor"	Crime boss Doc Stehlmeyer gets out of prison and plans a million-dollar jewelry theft, but his plans begin to fall apart almost immediately. Philip Carey, Frank Overton, and Milton Selzer guest-star.	May 28, 1961
1	10	"The Fighter"	Two loan sharks named Luther and Garfield promise to cancel former prizefighter Allie Jonay's debt if he will help them in a robbery. Gerald S. O'Loughlin, Norma Crane, and Joseph Elic guest-star.	June 4, 1961
1	11	"The Kidnapping"	After kidnappers demand that Roy Bradley pay an enormous ransom for the return of his son Wayne, Gower searches for the boy, and Bradley is forced to borrow money from his friend, Alex Meriden. Gower and his men capture three of the four kidnappers and free the boy, but the ransom money is missing. Paul Stewart, Alexander Scourby, Adam Williams, Jena Engstrom, and James Bonnet guest-star.	June 11, 1961
1	12	"The Dark Night"	Gower learns that mobsters plan to kill gangland financier Victor Vanda, whom Gower hopes to bring to justice alive so that he can identify and incriminate his colleagues in organized crime. He offers to protect Vanda in exchange for his testimony. Gower's men go undercover at a costume ball to keep Vanda safe from assassins. Joyce Meadows, Fritz Weaver, Iphigenie Castiglioni, Val Avery, Morgan Woodward, Jerry Wayne, Than Wyenn, Felix Deebank, and Kate Riordan guest-star.	June 18, 1961
1	13	"The Scott Machine"	When Warren W. Scott, a Nazi and admirer of Adolf Hitler, visits New York City to attend a large rally and attracts both supporters and protesters, Gower and his men, much to their distaste, are assigned to protect him from violent acts by his opponents. Robert Vaughn, Leora Dana, Carl Don, Frank Maxwell, John Astin, Hugh Sanders, Robert Brubaker, Lou Krugman, and Brad Morrow guest-star.	June 25, 1961
