= Forbidden Passage =

1941 film

- Theatrical release poster
- Directed by: Fred Zinnemann
- Written by: Carl Dudley
- Starring: Addison Richards
- Cinematography: Jackson Rose
- Edited by: Albert Akst
- Release date: February 8, 1941
- Running time: 21 minutes
- Country: United States
- Language: English

Forbidden Passage is a 1941 American short crime film in the Crime Does Not Pay series. It was directed by Fred Zinnemann and was nominated for an Academy Award at the 14th Academy Awards for Best Short Subject (Two-Reel).

== Plot ==
After a father uses illegal means to gain entry to the U.S. to rejoin his wife and daughter, the U.S. Immigration Service investigates.

== Cast ==
- Addison Richards as Frank J. Maxwell
- Wolfgang Zilzer as Otto Kestler
- Hugh Beaumont as Clements
- George Lessey as American Consul in Lisbon

== Reception ==
Boxoffice wrote: "Fair dramatic offering."
