= The Friends of Eddie Coyle =

1973 film directed by Peter Yates

- Theatrical release poster
- Directed by: Peter Yates
- Screenplay by: Paul Monash
- Based on: The Friends of Eddie Coyle (1970 novel) by George V. Higgins
- Produced by: Paul Monash
- Starring: Robert Mitchum; Peter Boyle; Richard Jordan; Steven Keats
- Cinematography: Victor J. Kemper
- Edited by: Patricia Lewis Jaffe
- Music by: Dave Grusin
- Distributed by: Paramount Pictures
- Release date: June 26, 1973
- Running time: 103 minutes
- Country: United States
- Language: English
- Budget: $3 million

The Friends of Eddie Coyle is a 1973 American neo-noir crime drama film directed by Peter Yates, adapted by Paul Monash (who also produced) from the 1970 novel by George V. Higgins. It stars Robert Mitchum, Peter Boyle, and Richard Jordan. The film tells the story of Eddie Coyle (Mitchum), a small-time career hoodlum in the Irish mob in Boston, Massachusetts. The title is purely ironic: Eddie has no friends. The plot is inspired by the real-life Winter Hill Gang.

While critical reception was positive, with particular praise for Mitchum's performance, the movie was not popular with filmgoers and failed to rank in the top 30 either in 1973 (when it was released mid-year) or 1974 and failed to recoup its budget in combined box office.

== Plot ==
At a diner in Quincy, Massachusetts, low-level gunrunner Eddie Coyle meets with Jackie Brown, a younger gunrunner, in order to obtain guns for a bank robbery crew led by Jimmy Scalise and Artie Van. The crew successfully robs the South Shore National Bank by first kidnapping its manager, Mr. Partridge, and they make a clean getaway. Coyle meets with ATF agent Dave Foley to discuss his sentencing for a botched trafficking mission in New Hampshire set up by Dillon, who owns a local bar that Coyle frequents; Coyle is unaware, however, that Dillon also works as an informant for Foley, earning $20 from him each week. Coyle tells Foley that he could give up Jackie in order to ease the sentencing; Foley sits on this idea.

Jackie meets a hippie couple in Cambridge who wish to purchase M16 rifles from him in order to rob a bank. He reluctantly agrees to sell them in a discreet location at a specific time. Jackie then meets with Coyle who requires Jackie to acquire guns for the next day. While unsure at first if he can complete the task that quickly, Jackie complies. He heads to Rhode Island later that night with an associate to get the M16s for the hippies, which he is successful in doing. Meanwhile, the crew robs a second bank in South Weymouth, but one of the tellers triggers a silent alarm and is shot dead by one of the robbers, requiring a hasty exit. The crew are able to flee without any police following them, but become wanted for murder as a result.

Jackie meets Coyle in the parking lot of a Dedham grocery store to deliver him the guns. Once the exchange is finished, Coyle calls Foley from a payphone to tip him off about Jackie's exchange with the hippies at the Sharon train station. There, Foley and a group of agents watch the area from afar with sniper rifles. The couple arrives, though Jackie tells them to meet him elsewhere at a later time, believing that he is being watched. Once the couple leaves, Foley and his team move in to make the arrest. Jackie recognizes the agents' cars and attempts to flee, but is boxed in at the exit and arrested, immediately realizing that Coyle had set him up.

Foley later tells Coyle that Jackie's arrest was not enough to clear Coyle's sentence. In preparation for the third robbery, the crew moves in to kidnap the bank's manager, but are ambushed by Foley and other ATF agents and placed under arrest. The next day, Coyle decides to tip Foley off about Scalise and his crew, but is unaware of their arrest. Foley shows him the arrest in the newspaper and departs, leaving Coyle anguished. Soon after, Dillon is told that a mob boss wants him to assassinate Coyle, thinking that Coyle ratted out the robbery crew. Dillon invites Coyle out to a Boston Bruins game at the Boston Garden along with a hood whom Dillon claims is his "wife's nephew". At the game, Coyle becomes severely drunk and eventually passes out during the car ride afterward. The hood drives them to a discreet location, where Dillon shoots Coyle in the head. They swap out cars in the parking lot of a bowling alley and leave.

Dillon and Foley meet outside Boston City Hall the next day, where Foley thanks Dillon for giving him Scalise and his crew. Foley is largely unconcerned that Dillon cannot tell him who murdered Coyle, leaving the impression that he knows Dillon is involved, but likely would not have pursued the killing of Coyle. After they finish conversing, they walk away in separate directions.

== Cast ==
Credits from the AFI Catalog of Feature Films.

- Robert Mitchum as Eddie Coyle
- Peter Boyle as Dillon
- Richard Jordan as Dave Foley
- Steven Keats as Jackie Brown
- Alex Rocco as Jimmy Scalise
- Joe Santos as Artie Van
- Mitchell Ryan as Waters
- Helena Carroll as Sheila Coyle
- Jack Kehoe as The Beard
- Margaret Ladd as Andrea
- Matthew Cowles as Pete
- James Tolkan as Contact Man
- Peter MacLean as Partridge
- Kevin O'Morrison as Bank Manager

== Production ==
During the making of the film, Robert Mitchum was interested in meeting the local gangsters as part of his research. Journalist George Kimball, a sports writer on the Boston Herald at the time, claimed that Mitchum wanted to meet Whitey Bulger and was warned against it by Higgins. What is claimed instead is that cast member Alex Rocco, who grew up in Somerville and was a hanger-on of the Winter Hill Gang during the early 1960s, introduced Mitchum to Howie Winter.

Howie Carr suggested that the character 'Dillon' (Peter Boyle) is a thinly-veiled reference to Whitey Bulger — both characters operate out of a bar and work as freelance contract killers, and both are police informants; though Bulger's status as an informant was not publicly-known at the time. The death of Eddie Coyle mirrors the killing of William "Billy" O'Brien, a Bulger associate and ex-convict who was killed over fears of turning turncoat. Author George V. Higgins denied Dillon was directly based on Bulger, though admitted he "wrote about Dillon before Whitey became Whitey, if you know what I mean."

=== Filming ===
Filming took place throughout the Boston area, including Government Center in Boston, and Dedham, Cambridge, Milton, Quincy, Sharon, Somerville, Malden, and Weymouth, Massachusetts. A sequence at Boston Garden was filmed during an NHL ice hockey game between the Boston Bruins and the Chicago Blackhawks.

On October 17, 1972, scenes were shot at the Dedham Plaza, showing W.T. Grant's, Woolworth's, Barbo's Furniture, Liggett's Drugstore, Capitol Supermarket, Friendly's, and Plaza Liquors. A few weeks later, on December 1, the crew shot the film's opening scene in Dedham Square. South Shore Bank (Note: As of 2023, it is a Citizen's Bank.), located in Dedham Square, was the bank robbed in the film. Local businesses including Geishecker's, P.J.'s Pastry Shop, McLellan's, and Gilbert's Package Store can be seen as the movie's bank manager drives through the Square. Mitchum signed autographs for fans in between takes.

== Release ==
=== Home media ===
The Criterion Collection released a special edition DVD of the film on May 19, 2009. It included a director's commentary by Peter Yates. Criterion released a Blu-ray version on April 28, 2015.

== Reception ==
The Friends of Eddie Coyle was not well received by the filmgoing public. It failed to place in the top 30 in film revenue in 1973 (when it was released mid-year) or 1974, and failed to recoup its estimated $3 million budget in combined box office returns. It was, however, well-reviewed by critics, and today is among the most highly regarded crime films of the 1970s by some.

Critic of the time, Pauline Kael explains why the reception might have been critical when she wrote for The New Yorker that the film was "shallow and tedious" and that the "police and gangsters had no roots."

In Time magazine, Richard Schickel wrote: "Now, at last, Mitchum achieves a kind of apotheosis in Peter Yates' strong, realistic and totally absorbing rendition of George V. Higgins' bestselling novel ... Self-consciously, and with an old pro's quiet skills, Mitchum explores all of Coyle's contradictory facets. At 56, when many of his contemporaries are hiding out behind the remnants of their youthful images, he has summoned up the skills and the courage to demonstrate a remarkable range of talents." The Economist described it as "a spare, lean thriller."

Upon the film's release, Roger Ebert of the Chicago Sun-Times gave it four stars, his highest rating, while Vincent Canby of The New York Times also reviewed it favorably, calling it "a good, tough, unsentimental movie". Both reviewers singled out Mitchum's lead performance as a key ingredient of the film's success. Ebert wrote: "Eddie Coyle is made for him [Mitchum]: a weary middle-aged man, but tough and proud; a man who has been hurt too often in life not to respect pain; a man who will take chances to protect his own territory."

On Rotten Tomatoes, it holds an 98% approval rating, based on 42 reviews with the consensus, "The Friends of Eddie Coyle sees Robert Mitchum in transformative late-career mode in a gritty and credible character study."

== 2009 bank robbery ==
On June 16, 2009, just a few weeks after the DVD release, the same bank was robbed in a manner reminiscent of how it was done in the film. Delroy George Henry drove up to the bank minutes before it opened. He then forced his way in the bank and tried to get the staff to open the vault. He also ordered staff to sit on the ground while brandishing a gun, just as was done in the film.

An employee sent a text message to an employee in another branch who then called the Dedham Police Department. Lieutenant Frank McMillan, a police officer working a detail 100 yards away, responded quickly and apprehended Henry.

== See also ==
- List of American films of 1973

== Works cited ==
- Parr, James L. (2009). Dedham: Historic and Heroic Tales from Shiretown. The History Press. ISBN 978-1-59629-750-0.
