= Cogan's Trade =

1974 novel by George V. Higgins

- Author: George V. Higgins
- Language: English
- Genre: Crime
- Publisher: Knopf
- Publication date: 1974
- Publication place: United States
- Pages: 216
- ISBN: 978-0-394-49057-1
- OCLC: 762621

Cogan's Trade is a 1974 crime novel by George V. Higgins. The novel was Higgins's third novel centered on crime in Boston neighborhoods, following The Friends of Eddie Coyle and The Digger's Game. In Cogan's Trade, Cogan is a hitman who targets the person responsible for a card-game heist. The person is identified through a second heist and pursued by Cogan, who works for an anonymous benefactor who also has a non-criminal role in society.

The 2012 film Killing Them Softly, directed by Andrew Dominik and starring Brad Pitt, is based on the novel.

== Plot ==
Markie Trattman is the proprietor of a criminal poker ring operating in a New England neighborhood. He decides to orchestrate an inside job by paying two men to rob his poker room; although he later openly admits his involvement to various criminal figures, he suffers no retaliation. In the fall of 1974, a man named Johnny "Squirrel" Amato plans to rob Markie's next poker game, anticipating the mafia will blame Markie for the heist. He enlists Frankie, a former business associate, and Russell, an unstable heroin addict, to perform the robbery. Upon completing the crime, Russell travels to Florida.

"The driver", an emissary for the mafia, converses with a hitman named Jackie Cogan. Jackie has figured out who robbed the game, but even though he understands Markie was uninvolved, he believes Markie should be murdered in order to restore confidence amongst the local mobsters. After murdering Markie, Jackie meets with Mitch, another professional hitman, to prepare for the assassinations of Russell, Frankie, and Squirrel. Jackie becomes frustrated with Mitch's flagrant lechery and alcoholism, and convinces Driver to arrange Mitch's arrest.

Russell is arrested on a drug possession charge; meanwhile, Jackie confronts Frankie and agrees to spare him his life, on the condition he reveal Squirrel's whereabouts. Jackie murders Squirrel before murdering Frankie; he then meets with Driver to collect his fee. Driver refuses to pay Jackie in full, and Jackie demands his payment.

== Characters ==
- Jackie Cogan, a enforcer/hitman for the New England mob. He is married and keeps his mob activities separate from his personal life, although his wife is aware of his work. His boss is Dillon who returns from The Friends of Eddie Coyle.
- Frankie, a low level thug, just out of prison where he met his partner Russell.
- Russell, an unstable, heroin addict thug, who robs liquor stores and clinics. He has a side gig stealing and breeding dogs. He was in prison 10 years prior to the novel.
- Johnny "Squirrel" Amato, a local mobster who employs Frankie and Russell to knock over the card game.
- "The driver", a mysterious man who informs Cogan of his tasks that the mob have set.

== Analysis ==
Cogan's Trade and its predecessors The Friends of Eddie Coyle and The Digger's Game "exalt crime at the expense of criminals". In the novel, cars are a common motif, appearing at the beginning of numerous chapters. Higgins pairs drivers with cars that match both their socioeconomic status and how they want to project themselves. In one instance, a character compares "driving a Chrysler 300F at 80 mph to having sex with a beautiful woman". Cars are also places where characters are killed.

Diego Gambetta, writing about communication between criminals, says Cogan "establishes his bona fides with others by invoking common acquaintances" with dialogue such as:

- "Who are you? I've never seen you before and now you are telling me all these things."
- "I am just a guy. Very few people know me. Oh, yes. China Tanzi knows me."

Higgins employs numerous conversations embedded with extensive slang to illustrate events rather than to write of them happening. A book on American culture said, "A grand master of tactical digression, [Higgins] allows his narrative, containing the criminal design, to wind twistingly around a series of set pieces in which the action is suspended, often for chapters at a time, while the gangsters talk about sex and marriage, who goes out for coffee, their weight and root-canal work." One instance of Higgins's slang is the word "paracki" to refer to paraldehyde, a depressant: "[H]e puts some of the paracki in the glass and some water and they sit there and they sip it."

== Reception ==
The New York Times, in its review of Cogan's Trade, wrote that the novel's appeal was "the seamy nether-world of the savage seventies" where none of the characters can be considered good. The newspaper said the novel was challenging to read with its extensive use of slang, and it also found the role of women and of prisons to be underdeveloped. Author D. Keith Mano said of the novel, "Higgins's approach is evidential. He doesn't judge. He is as unassertive as a court stenographer."
