= The Human Jungle (film) =

1954 film by Joseph M. Newman

- Theatrical release poster
- Directed by: Joseph M. Newman
- Written by: Daniel Fuchs; William Sackheim
- Produced by: Hayes Goetz
- Starring: Gary Merrill; Jan Sterling; Regis Toomey
- Cinematography: Ellis W. Carter
- Edited by: Sam Fields
- Music by: Hans J. Salter
- Production company: Allied Artists Pictures
- Distributed by: Allied Artists Pictures
- Release date: October 3, 1954
- Running time: 82 minutes
- Country: United States
- Language: English
- Box office: $1 million

The Human Jungle is a 1954 American film noir crime film directed by Joseph M. Newman and starring Gary Merrill, Jan Sterling and Regis Toomey. It was produced and distributed by the Hollywood studio Allied Artists.

== Plot ==
Under pressure to clean up crime in the streets, Abe Rowan, chief of police, assigns Capt. "Danny" Danforth to take charge and restore order. Danforth assures wife Pat the dangerous assignment is strictly temporary, determined to get out of police work for good.

A murder of a striptease dancer becomes Danforth's top priority. He and second-in-command Detective Geddes cast their suspicions toward hoodlum Earl Swados, attempting to persuade another stripper, Mary Abbott, to turn state's evidence against him. After charging her with prostitution, the cops spread the word that Mary is going to inform on Swados and the local crime boss, Leonard Ustick.

Complications arise when another detective, Strauss, shoots an innocent bystander and police are falsely accused of beating three young men, causing neighborhood tensions to rise. Danforth takes a chance by releasing Mary, who had no intention of double-crossing the gangsters. Swados tries to murder her, chasing Mary through a brewery before Danforth and Geddes come to her rescue. Danforth resolves to stay on the job, no matter how long it takes.

== Cast ==
- Gary Merrill as Police Capt. John Danforth
- Jan Sterling as Mary Abbott
- Regis Toomey as Det. Bob Geddes
- Lamont Johnson as Det. Lannigan
- Patrick Waltz as Det. Strauss
- Chuck Connors as Earl Swados
- Paula Raymond as Pat Danforth
- Emile Meyer as Police Chief Abe Rowan
- George Wallace as Det. O'Neill
- Chubby Johnson as Greenie
- James Westerfield as Police Capt. Marty Harrison
- Florenz Ames as Leonard Ustick
- Claude Akins as George Mandy
- Booth Colman as Wallace
- Henry Kulky as Matty
- Hugh Boswell as Lynch
- Rankin Mansfield as Det. Bledsoe
- Leo Cleary as Karns, Police Fingerprint Man
- Don Keefer as Det. Cleary
- Marie Blake as Mrs. Ashton
- Marjorie Bennett as Mrs. Lee
- Lester Dorr as Rudy, Salesman
- Martha Wentworth as Marcy, Janitress
- Ford Rainey as Jones
- Vince Barnett as Old Mugging Victim
- Shirley Jean Rickert as Stripper

== Bibliography ==
- Hannan, Brian. In Theaters Everywhere: A History of the Hollywood Wide Release, 1913-2017. McFarland, 2018.
