= Crime Does Not Pay (film and radio series) =

American anthology film and radio series

Crime Does Not Pay is an MGM anthology crime film series of shorts that ran from 1935 to 1947.

== Background ==
Each film runs approximately 20 minutes in length and begins with an actor appearing as "your MGM crime reporter" introducing a law-enforcement official who would inform the audience of a criminal trend such as drunk driving, juvenile delinquency and fraud that would form the basis of the episode. The dramatic episodes resolved with sobering, ironic or bleak outcomes for the perpetrators.

MGM used the series as a training ground for its young contract players and cast each film primarily with character actors, although several stars appeared, including Van Johnson, J. Carrol Naish, Leon Ames, Laraine Day, Darryl Hickman, Bela Lugosi and Ed Begley. Some of the unknown actors in the series' episodes would later find feature-film success, such as Audrey Totter, Irene Hervey, Tom Neal, Marsha Hunt, Stephen McNally and Barry Nelson. The most famous of these was Robert Taylor, who appeared in the first film in the series, Buried Loot (1935), under his real name of Spangler Brugh as an emergency replacement for an actor who had fallen ill just before filming. Taylor had been an MGM "test boy" whose job was to be filmed opposite various young ingenues for screen tests.

Crime Does Not Pay later spawned a radio series of the same name, recorded and broadcast at MGM's New York station WMGM. Written by Ira Marion and directed by Marx B. Loeb, it aired for two years (October 10, 1949—October 10, 1951), including repeats. It moved to the Mutual Broadcasting System for its final run (January 7—December 22, 1952).

== Film series episodes ==
- Buried Loot with Robert Taylor
- Alibi Racket with Edward Norris and Alan Bridge
- Desert Death with Raymond Hatton
- A Thrill for Thelma with Irene Hervey and Robert Livingston
- Hit-and-Run Driver with George Walcott and William Gould
- The Perfect Set-Up with William Henry, Helene Chadwick, Frank Shannon, and Robert Dudley
- Foolproof with Niles Welch and Alonzo Price
- The Public Pays (Oscar winner) with Richard Alexander
- Torture Money (Oscar winner), with Edwin Maxwell and George Lynn
- It May Happen to You, with J. Carrol Naish
- Soak the Poor with Leslie Fenton and Leon Ames
- Give Till It Hurts with Janet Beecher, Clay Clement, and Howard Hickman
- Behind the Criminal with Edward Emerson, Walter Kingsford, Anna Q. Nilsson, and Joe Sawyer
- What Price Safety! with Lionel Royce, George Huston, and John Wray
- Miracle Money with John Miljan, Boyd Crawford, Robert Middlemass, and Fred Warren
- Come Across with Bernard Nedell, Bernadene Hayes, Rita La Roy, and Donald Douglas
- A Criminal Is Born with George Breakston and David Durand
- They're Always Caught (Oscar nominee), with Stanley Ridges, John Eldredge, Louis Jean Heydt, and Charles Waldron
- Think It Over with Lester Matthews, Charles D. Brown, Donald Barry, and Dwight Frye
- The Wrong Way Out with Kenneth Howell and Linda Terry
- Money to Loan with Alan Dinehart, Paul Guilfoyle, John Butler, Addison Richards, and Tom Collins
- While America Sleeps with Richard Purcell, Lenita Lane, Egon Brecher, and Fred Vogeding
- Help Wanted with Tom Neal, Jo Ann Sayers, Clem Bevans, Edward Pawley, and Truman Bradley
- Think First with Marc Lawrence and Laraine Day
- Drunk Driving (Oscar nominee) with Richard Purcell, Jo Ann Sayers, and Richard Lane
- Pound Foolish with Neil Hamilton, Lynne Carver, Gertrude Michael, and Victor Varconi
- Know Your Money with Noel Madison, Dennis Moore, Charles D. Brown, William Edmunds, John Wray, and Adrian Morris
- Jack Pot with Tom Neal, Ann Morriss, Edwin Maxwell, and Jean Rouverol
- Women in Hiding with Marsha Hunt, Jane Drummond, Mary Bovard, C. Henry Gordon, and Granville Bates
- Buyer Beware with Charles Arnt and Hugh Beaumont
- Soak the Old with Ralph Morgan and George Cleveland
- You, the People with C. Henry Gordon, Byron Shores, Paul Everton, and Matt McHugh
- Respect the Law with Moroni Olsen, Richard Lane, Frank Orth, and William Forrest
- Forbidden Passage (Oscar nominee) with Addison Richards, Wolfgang Zilzer, Hugh Beaumont, and George Lessey
- Coffins on Wheels with Darryl Hickman, Tom Baker, Allan Lane, and Cy Kendall
- Sucker List with Lynne Carver, Noel Madison, John Archer, and George Cleveland
- Don't Talk (Oscar nominee), with Donald Douglas, Gloria Holden, Barry Nelson, and Harry Worth
- For the Common Defense! with John Litel, Douglas Fowley, Horace McNally, and Van Johnson
- Keep 'em Sailing with Jim Davis and Ian Keith
- Plan for Destruction (wartime subject with Lewis Stone, released with the Crime Does Not Pay series)
- Patrolling the Ether with Hazel Brooks and Marc Cramer
- Easy Life with Steven Geray, Bernard Thomas, and William "Bill" Phillips
- Dark Shadows with Henry O'Neill, Morris Ankrum, Arthur Space, and Paul Guilfoyle
- Fall Guy with Leon Ames and Paul Langton
- The Last Installment with Walter Sande, Cameron Mitchell, William "Bill" Phillips, Bob Lewis, and Addison Richards
- Phantoms, Inc. with Arthur Shields, Harry Hayden, and Frank Reicher
- A Gun in His Hand (Oscar nominee), with Tom Trout, Richard Gaines, and Anthony Caruso
- Purity Squad with Byron Foulger, Dick Elliott, Morris Ankrum, and Frank Fenton
- The Luckiest Guy in the World (Oscar nominee) with Barry Nelson, Eloise Hardt, George Travell, Milton Kibbee, and Harry Cheshire

A 1944 Crime Does Not Pay short with studio newcomers Audrey Totter and Tom Trout was expanded into a 57-minute feature film, Main Street After Dark (released 1945), with new footage of Edward Arnold as a police detective.

Although not filmed by MGM, the Disney Eyes of the Navy short was distributed to theaters as part of the Crime Does Not Pay series.

== Home video ==
The Warner Archive Collection has released the entire series of 50 shorts on DVD-R as Crime Does Not Pay: The Complete Shorts Collection. Some episodes can also be found as extras on DVDs and Blu-rays of classic MGM films of the period:

- The Public Pays is on Wife vs. Secretary (1936)
- Drunk Driving is on The Hunchback of Notre Dame (1939)
- Jack Pot is on I Love You Again (1940)
- Don't Talk is on Random Harvest (1942)
- For the Common Defense! is on Mrs. Miniver (1942)
- Purity Squad is on Without Love (1945)
- The Luckiest Guy in the World is on Ziegfeld Follies (1945)
- Women in Hiding, You, the People, Forbidden Passage, A Gun in His Hand and The Luckiest Guy in the World are on the documentary Film Noir: Bringing Darkness to Light (2006). This was originally a bonus DVD in the Film Noir Classic Collection: Vol. 3 box set.
