= Mel Epstein =

American film director (1910–1994)

Mel Epstein (March 25, 1910 in Dayton, Ohio – December 14, 1994) was an American film director and producer. He produced several films, including Secret of the Incas and Alaska Seas. He also produced episodes of the 1961 television series The Asphalt Jungle.
