= The Friends of Eddie Coyle (novel) =

1970 novel by George V. Higgins

- First edition
- Author: George V. Higgins
- Language: English
- Genre: Crime
- Publisher: Knopf
- Publication date: 1970
- Publication place: United States

The Friends of Eddie Coyle, published in 1970, is the debut novel of George V. Higgins, then an Assistant United States Attorney in Boston. The novel is a realistic depiction of the Irish-American underworld in Boston. Its central character is Eddie Coyle, a small-time criminal and informant.

The Friends of Eddie Coyle was adapted into a 1973 film, directed by Peter Yates and starring Robert Mitchum.

The relentless realism and unglamorous nature of the characters in Eddie Coyle was in sharp contrast to some other gangster novels of the era, particularly Mario Puzo's The Godfather, a more romanticized look at organized crime that later would be adapted into the popular 1972 film of the same name.

Ashbel Green was the editor.

== Plot ==
Eddie Coyle is an aging, low-level gunrunner for a crime organization in Boston, Massachusetts. He is awaiting sentencing after being convicted of driving a hijacked truck in New Hampshire. Eddie had been driving the truck for Dillon, a convicted felon and career criminal who is well connected to the syndicate. Coyle has refused to give Dillon up to the authorities in exchange for leniency. Coyle's last chance to avoid a prison term is a sentencing recommendation from ATF Special Agent Dave Foley, who demands that Coyle become an informer in return.

A gang led by Jimmy Scalisi and Artie Van has been pulling off a series of daring day-time bank robberies with pistols supplied by Coyle. One of Coyle's sources for the pistols is a young gun runner, Jackie Brown, who is involved in a deal to supply military machine guns (M16s) for other clients. When taking the delivery of the pistols, Coyle witnesses the rifles in the trunk of Jackie Brown's car and immediately informs Foley. Jackie is apprehended by Foley and his agents. Coyle feels he has fulfilled his end of the deal, but Foley puts the squeeze on Eddie, demanding more information for his cooperation.

Angry at his mis-treatment of her, Scalisi's girlfriend Wanda tips off the police about the next planned bank robbery, leading the state police to arrest Scalisi and Van's gang in the commission of the robbery. During the arrests, the police shoot and kill a young member of the gang who is well-connected (and possibly related) to the head of a powerful crime family.

That same morning, with both men unaware that the bank robbers have been arrested, Coyle suggests that he may be willing to give Foley the names of the bank robbers in exchange for his slate being wiped clean in New Hampshire. Foley agrees to meet Coyle later in the day, with the understanding that if Coyle doesn't show, he opted not to rat on the bank robbers.

The head of the crime family mistakenly believes it was Coyle who informed on Scalisi and Van's gang. The boss, referred to only as "the man," is furious because the state police killed his friend, who was part of the gang, during the arrest. The man hires Dillon to kill Coyle, who begrudgingly takes the contract.

We learn from Foley that Coyle never showed, and thus did not inform. After waiting for Coyle, Foley buys a paper and sees that the information has become useless anyhow, as the robbers have been arrested. Later that afternoon, Coyle enters Dillon's bar in a sour mood, knowing he'll have to serve time in prison. Dillon receives a call confirming the plan to kill Coyle, and subsequently invites him to the Bruins game that evening. At the game, Dillon plies Coyle with liquor and eventually shoots him while an accomplice drives the men after the game. They leave Coyle's body in a car in the West End Bowling Alleys parking lot.

In the final chapter, Jackie Brown is in court being arraigned for possession of machine guns. After pleading not guilty, a trial date is set. The prosecutor and defense counsel discuss options, but both show resignation that whatever happens to Jackie Brown, nothing will change in the world of crime.

== Critical reception ==
The novel was an instant success, with Higgins receiving praise from Norman Mailer as "the American writer who is closest to Henry Green. What I can't get over is that so good a first novel was written by the fuzz."

Elmore Leonard said that The Friends of Eddie Coyle was the best crime novel ever written, though Higgins hated being classified as a "crime writer." According to Leonard, "He saw himself as the Charles Dickens of crime in Boston instead of a crime writer. He just understood the human condition and he understood it most vividly in the language and actions among low lives." The New Yorker wrote that "while the book goes through many of the machinations of the mystery genre—murders, bank robberies, and double crosses—it is finally about nothing other than language itself." In a retrospective 2010 review, Slate said the book "holds up as both a writer's-writer thriller and as popular pulp." The book review website The Pequod rated the book a 9.5 (out of 10.0) and called it a "superb crime novel... The book’s characters and conversations are highly realistic, based no doubt on real individuals Higgins encountered on the job, and the cops are nearly as dishonorable as the criminals. While the plot is somewhat undeveloped, Higgins knows his characters well and writes some of the best dialogue that has ever appeared in an American crime novel."

== Adaptations ==
The novel was adapted into a 1973 film, and a stage play by Bill Doncaster.

== Sources ==
The character Eddie Coyle bore an uncanny resemblance to ex-convict William (Billy) O'Brien, one of James J. "Whitey" Bulger's old bank-robbing associates who had been murdered in 1967, three years before the book's publication. O'Brien, like Coyle, had just been arrested and the newspapers reported that O'Brien's associates were concerned that he might become a turncoat. O'Brien's slaying was never solved, nor was Coyle's.

During the making of the movie in the Boston area, actor Robert Mitchum (who was cast as Eddie Coyle) was interested in meeting the local gangsters as part of his research into the part. Journalist George Kimball, a sportswriter on the Boston Herald at the time, claimed that Mitchum wanted to meet Whitey Bulger and was warned against it by Higgins. Kimball claims that the two did actually socialize, though there is doubt that a meeting between Mitchum and Bulger ever took place. What is known is that cast member Alex Rocco, a native of Somerville, introduced Mitchum to local Irish-American gangsters of his acquaintance, including Howie Winter of the Winter Hill Gang that Bulger belonged to. Born Alexander Petricone, Jr., Rocco had been a hanger-on of the Winter Hill Gang and was held for questioning in the murder of Charlestown Mob member Bernie McLaughlin, an incident that had touched off the Boston Irish Gang War of the 1960s. After being released from jail, Petricone left Boston for Los Angeles in 1962, where he became an actor.

Howie Carr, a newspaper columnist and radio personality who has written extensively on the Boston underworld, reports that Mitchum dined with Winter and Johnny Martorano (whom Carr described as a co-leader of the Winter Hill gang), a man who has been alleged to have killed the actual probable prototype of Eddie Coyle, on most nights during the filming of the movie. Carr found that the fictional murderer of Coyle, an ex-con named Dillon who set up the failed truck hijacking for which Coyle was to be sent back to prison, bore an uncanny similarity to Whitey Bulger. Dillon owned a bar through a front and was a freelance contract killer. The fictional Dillon was also an informant, like Whitey, who was shown both protecting and promoting his own interests by funneling information about his underworld competition to the police. Carr stated, "In other words, Dillon appeared to be a prototype of the gangster that James J. Bulger would become," although George V. Higgins, just before his death, denied that he had based Dillon on Bulger when he was queried by Carr. "I wrote about Dillon before Whitey became Whitey, if you know what I mean." He also denied that he knew who O'Brien was. (Higgins had a character based on Bulger associate Steve "The Rifleman" Flemmi listening to Carr on the radio in his last novel At End of Day.)

== Editions ==
Macmillan Publishing printed a 40th anniversary edition of The Friends of Eddie Coyle under the Picador imprint in 2010.
