= George V. Higgins =

American novelist

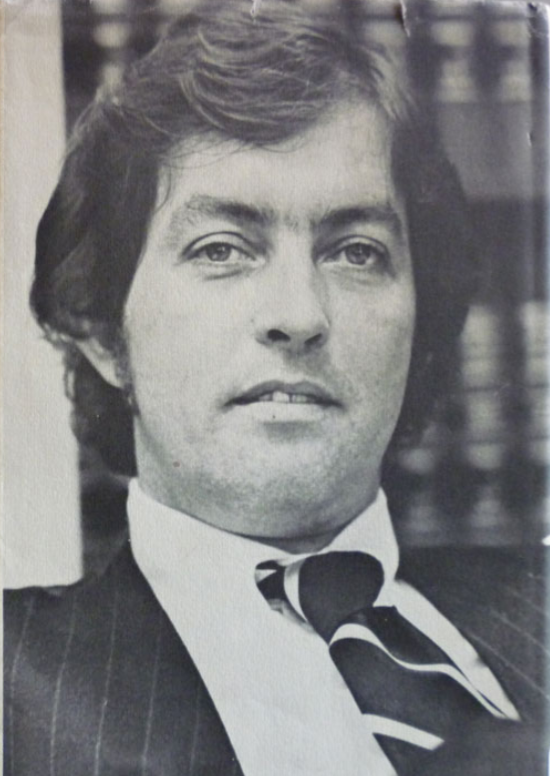
- Born: George Vincent Higgins II; November 13, 1939; Brockton, Massachusetts, U.S.
- Died: November 6, 1999 (aged 59); Milton, Massachusetts, U.S.
- Education: Boston College (BA, JD); Stanford University (MA)
- Occupations: Author; lawyer; newspaper columnist; college professor

Signature
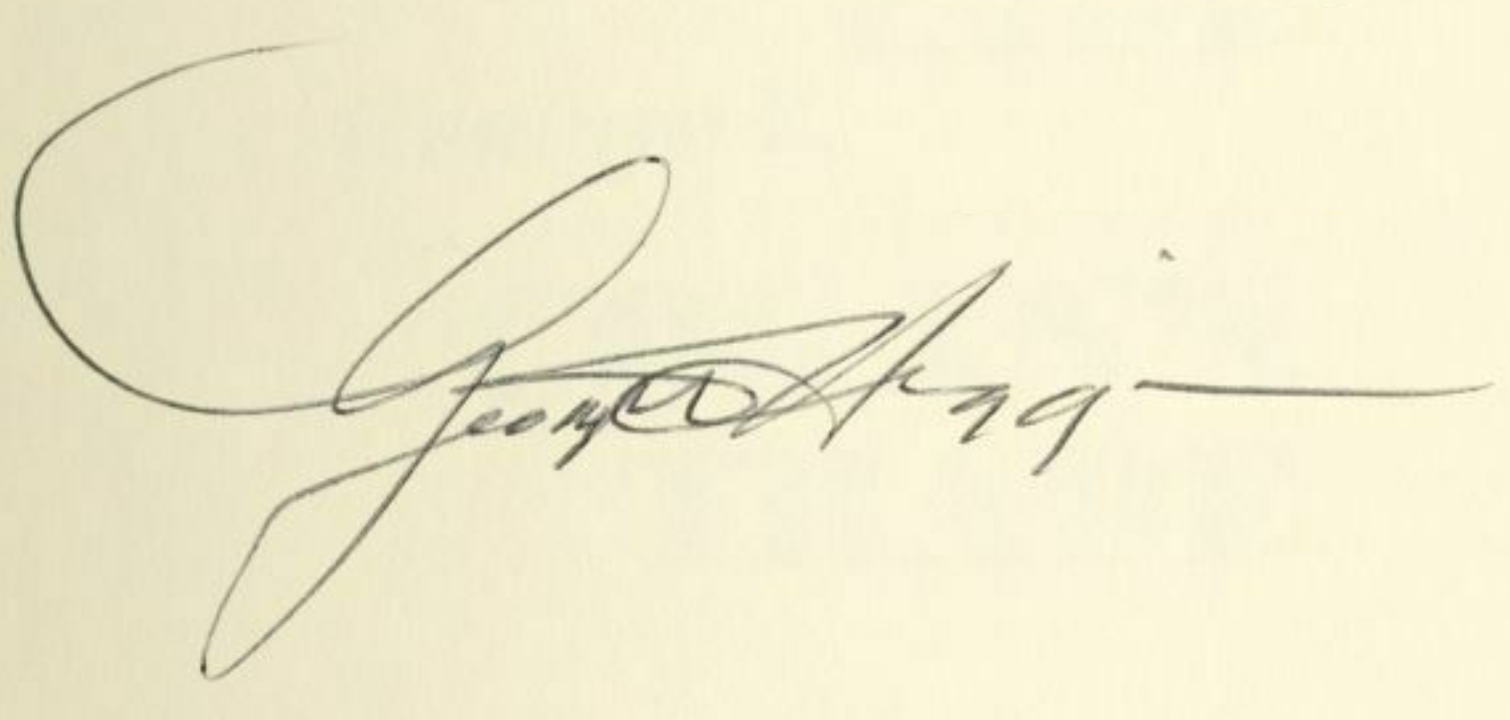

George Vincent Higgins II (November 13, 1939 – November 6, 1999) was an American author, lawyer, newspaper columnist, raconteur and college professor. He authored more than thirty books, including Bomber's Law, Trust, and Kennedy for the Defense, and is best known for his bestselling crime novels, including The Friends of Eddie Coyle, which established the Boston noir genre of gangster tales that spawned several popular films by followers in the late 20th and early 21st centuries.

== Life and career ==
Higgins was born in Brockton, Massachusetts, grew up in the nearby town of Rockland and attended Boston College, where he was editor of the campus literary magazine, Stylus, and graduated in 1961. In 1965, he received an MA from Stanford University; in 1967, a JD from Boston College. His full name was George Vincent Higgins II, after an uncle living in Randolph, but he dropped the numeric (unofficially) in midlife. His books were all published as by George V. Higgins. He was married twice, first to Elizabeth Mulkerin Higgins (divorced 1979); second to Loretta Cubberley Higgins.

Higgins worked as a deputy assistant attorney general for the Commonwealth, and an Assistant United States Attorney and a journalist and newspaper columnist before becoming a novelist. He wrote for the Associated Press, The Boston Globe, the Boston Herald American, and the Wall Street Journal. He spent seven years in anti-organized-crime government positions, including Assistant U.S. Attorney for Massachusetts. He entered private practice of law in 1973, and was active for ten years. During those years he represented several famous figures, such as Eldridge Cleaver (although he withdrew from the case after conflict with Cleaver) and G. Gordon Liddy. He was a professor at Boston College and Boston University.

He died of a heart attack at age 59 at his home in Milton, Massachusetts.

== Writing ==
Higgins was a stylist, particularly noted for his realistic dialogue, a style reminiscent of the stories of mid-20th century writer John O'Hara whose work Higgins praised in his preface to a collection of O'Hara stories. Higgins was proud of his skill in rendering dialogue with great accuracy. He liked to point out that accurate dialogue is not a verbatim transcription of things said but an imaginative recreation in compressed form. He was also an expert in lending atmosphere to a series of harsh or barren facts, inducing his readers to figure out important things artfully implied in the text but never stated.

Many of Higgins's works focus on the criminal element and the cops who pursue them in and around Boston. His four Jerry Kennedy books form a connected series. Characters important in some of his novels often are mentioned in others, usually in passing but significant references, as in Trust, Outlaws, Bomber's Law and the Kennedy books. He is best remembered for his bestselling 1970 novel The Friends of Eddie Coyle, which was adapted into a 1973 film starring Robert Mitchum and Peter Boyle. Higgins once wrote: "The success of The Friends of Eddie Coyle was termed 'overnight' in some quarters; that was one hell of a damned long night, lasting seventeen years..." During those 17 years, he had written 14 previous novels; he eventually destroyed them. Christopher Lehmann-Haupt called The Friends of Eddie Coyle "one of the best of its genre I have read since Hemingway's The Killers."

"Like Joyce, Higgins uses language in torrents, beautifully crafted, ultimately intending to create a panoramic impression," wrote Roderick MacLeish in the Times Literary Supplement. But this dialogue-laden approach did not appeal to every critic, or even MacLeish, who added, "the plot of a Higgins novel – suspense, humor and tragedy – is a blurrily perceived skeleton within the monsoon of dialogue."

In 1990, Higgins published On Writing, a book of hard-bitten advice for aspiring writers. The book was notable for its long excerpts of writers Higgins admired, including William Manchester and Irwin Shaw. It is also notable for its unusually blunt dismissal of authors such as Emily Dickinson and Franz Kafka, with Higgins declaring that, "[i]f you do not seek to publish what you have written, then you are not a writer and you never will be."

== Published works ==
=== Novels ===
- The Friends of Eddie Coyle (1970)
- The Digger's Game (1973)
- Cogan's Trade (1974)
- A City on a Hill (1975)
- The Judgment of Deke Hunter (1976)
- Dreamland (1977)
- A Year or So with Edgar (1979)
- Kennedy for the Defense (1980) (Jerry Kennedy series)
- The Rat on Fire (1981)
- The Patriot Game (1982)
- A Choice of Enemies (1984)
- Old Earl Died Pulling Traps: A Story (1984)
- Penance for Jerry Kennedy (1985) (Jerry Kennedy series)
- Impostors (1986)
- Outlaws (1987)
- Wonderful Years, Wonderful Years (1988)
- Trust (1989)
- Victories (1990)
- The Mandeville Talent (1991)
- Defending Billy Ryan (1992) (Jerry Kennedy series)
- Bomber's Law (1993)
- Swan Boats at Four (1995)
- Sandra Nichols Found Dead (1996) (Jerry Kennedy series)
- A Change of Gravity (1997)
- The Agent (1999)
- At End of Day (2000)

=== Collections ===
- The Sins of the Fathers: Stories by George V. Higgins (André Deutsch 1988)
- The Easiest Thing in the World: The Unpublished Fiction of George V. Higgins (2004)

=== Non-fiction ===
==== Politics ====
- The Friends of Richard Nixon (1975)
- Style Versus Substance, a book about Boston Mayor Kevin White and his relations with the press (1984)

==== Baseball ====
- The Progress of the Seasons (1989)

==== Writing ====
- On Writing (1990)

== Filmography ==
Films adapted from his novels:

- The Friends of Eddie Coyle (1973), from the book of the same name (1970)
- Killing Them Softly (2012), from Cogan's Trade (1974)
