= Tom Hernández =

American theater, films, & tv actor (1915-1984)

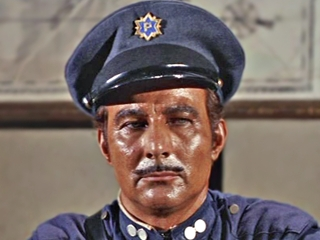
- Tom Hernández in one episode of Mission: Impossible (in "Wheels", 1966), playing to "The Desk Sergeant"
- Born: Domingo Tomás Hernández; October 9, 1915; Puerto de la Cruz, Tenerife (Canary Islands, Spain)
- Died: June 2, 1984 (aged 68); Los Angeles, California
- Occupation: Actor

Domingo Tomás Hernández Bethencourt (October 9, 1915 – June 2, 1984), known professionally as Tom Hernández (or Tommy Hernandez), was a Spanish-born American theater, films, and television actor, who played supporting roles, usually Hispanics, throughout his career. He was mainly known for their roles in the American film The 3rd Voice (1960), and in the Spanish films "Fuerza Mortal" (1980) and "Tunka, el guerrero" (1983). However, he is best remembered by his interpretation of Don Diego character at the San Diego's fair (California) Del Mar Fair during almost of four decades until his death in 1984. He held the position of goodwill ambassador of the fair, promoting it and he welcomed people that came to the fair with his greeting in Spanish "¡Bienvenidos, Amigos!" ("Welcome Friends!"), greeting for which he was known. He was brother of also actor Pepe Hern and uncle of present-day actor Justin Lopez from The Three Stooges (2012 film).

== Biography ==
Hernández was born on October 9, 1915, in Puerto de la Cruz, Tenerife (Canary Islands, Spain), to Domingo Hernández and Dominga Bethencourt. In 1920, Hernandez emigrated with his parents and an eldest brother to the United States when he was five. He also had a younger brother (who was born in the U.S., twelve years after his arrival there), the future actor Pepe Hern.

Eventually, Hernandez became interested in film, and got jobs of helper, which led him to small roles with marked Hispanic roots. Domingo chosen the Tom Hernandez stage name, seeking a certain approach to their host country, but without completely abandoning their roots.

After working in theater for a long time, he was offered a small role in Tarzan and the Slave Girl (1950), and during the '50s was common to see him at many American films and some episodes of some American TV series, playing supporting roles.

The film in which, perhaps, had the greater role in his Hollywood career was "The 3rd Voice" (1960)

That brief moment of brilliance on the big screen in the early 60 allowed to Tom Hernandez access to more regular jobs in renowned television series as " The Virginian" (1962), "Mission: Impossible" (1965) and "Daniel Boone" (1969), one of the last TV series in which he worked. Already into the '70s, his appearances on screen were losing relevance, focusing thereafter, basically, in his job as goodwill ambassador in the Del Mar Fair, in San Diego (California), in which he had already begun to work from the 40s.

Although he continued to participate in some movies, highlighting its roles in the Spanish films Cuatro locos buscan manicomio (1980), Fuerza mortal (1980) and Tunka, el guerrero (1983).

By other way, since 1947 Hernández began to interpret Don Diego's character at the Del Mar Fair in San Diego (California), appearing as master of ceremonies for the annual meeting and occupying the work of promoter the fair, being goodwill ambassador in this fairgrounds.

He combined his work in films and its role as master of ceremonies for the fair until the last years of his life. He died on June 2, 1984 in Los Angeles, California.

== Legacy ==
- On the death of Hernandez, the council of Del Mar Fair decided to exhibit a bronze statue of 16 feet dedicated to Hernández as Don Diego, created by artist Maher Morcos, at the entrance to the fair. The statue was presented in 1985.
- In honor to him was created also The Don Diego Fund in 1986, a nonprofit scholarship program of the San Diego County Fair to economically help to the outstanding San Diego County high school students who have participated in the annual San Diego County Fair or other events concluded by the Del Mar Fairgrounds. Thus, this fund has delivered over $556,000 in scholarships and grants along its trajectory and has helped more than 130 students achieve a college degree. The Don Diego Fund is also a tax-exempt 501(c)(3) organization.

== Trivia ==
- The character "Don Diego" was based on the landowner Don Diego Alvarado, owner of a great land in what is now Del Mar, California, in 1800 year.
- In the beauty contest at the fair, Hernández met a girl named Raquel Tejada, who was one of the contestants of this contest, and who later would become the actress Raquel Welch.

== Filmography ==
This is a list of films of Tom Hernández

Year	Title	Role	Notes
1938	Dead Men Tell No Tales	Spanish Bartender	
1950	Tarzan and the Slave Girl	Molo	Uncredited
1952	Yankee Buccaneer	Guard	Uncredited
1953	Salome	Townsman	Uncredited
1953	Trouble Along the Way	Butler	Uncredited
1953	Sombrero	Man in Cafe	Uncredited
1953	The Desert Song	Legionnaire	Uncredited
1953	Latin Lovers	Nora's Dancing Partner	Uncredited
1954	Phantom of the Rue Morgue	Gendarme Lara	Uncredited
1955	The Last Command	Aida	Uncredited
1956	Anything Goes	Frenchman	Uncredited
1956	Santiago	Soldier	Uncredited
1957	El reflejo del alma		(Spanish film)
1958	Party Girl	Sketch Artist, Canetto Trial	Uncredited
1959	Holiday for Lovers	Portrait Painter	Uncredited
1959	It Started with a Kiss	Minor Role	Uncredited
1960	The 3rd Voice	Desk´s Clerk	
1961	The Comancheros	Croupier	Uncredited
1962	Four Horsemen of the Apocalypse	Headwaiter	Uncredited
1962	Tender Is the Night	Nobleman	Uncredited
1963	Fun in Acapulco	Photographer	Uncredited
1965	Choque de Sentimentos		(Brazilian film)
1972	Trouble Man	Police Sergeant	
1974	La dynamite est bonne à boire		(French film)
1979	Black Jack		
1980	Fuerza mortal (Big games)	Simpson	(Spanish film)
1980	Cuatro locos buscan manicomio	Gerente	(Spanish film)
1981	Asalto al casino		
1981	Homo hominis opus I	Dictator	Short, (Spanish film)
1982	Othello	black command - as Fergusson	
1984	Tunka, el guerrero	great sage	(Spanish film) (final film role)

== TV series ==
This is a list of television series in which he has appeared.

Year	Title	Role	episodes
1951	The Adventures of Kit Carson	Tom Hernández	A Ticket to Mexico
1955	Letter to Loretta	Angelo	The Waiting Game
1955	Death Valley Days	Tony	The Valencia Cake
1955	My Little Margie	Hernando	Papa and Mambo
1956	Cheyenne	Ramón	Fury at Rio Hondo
1957	State Trooper	Pepe Soto	Beef ala Murder
1959	Zorro		chapters in 1957
1959	Laramie	Montero Ríos	The Run to Tumavaca
1959	Wagon Train	Denny	The Stagecoach Story
1960	Bourbon Street Beat	Victor	Last Exit
1960	Wanted: Dead or Alive	Carlos	Witch Woman S3 E14
1962	Target: The Corruptors!		Babes in Wall Street
1962	The Virginian	The Spanish Officer	Riff-Raff (chapter in 1962)
1966	Mission: Impossible	The Desk Sergeant	Wheels (chapter in 1966)
1969	Daniel Boone	Surgeon	The Grand Alliance
1969	Family Affair	Captain	Lost in Spain, Part 3
