= Pepe Hern =

American supporting actor

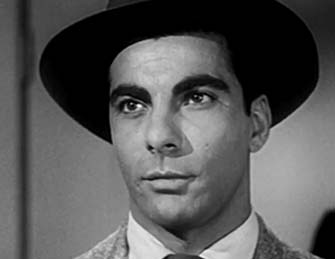
- Pepe Hern in an episode of The Man Behind the Badge ("The Case of the Priceless Passport", 1955)
- Born: José Hernández Bethencourt; June 6, 1927; New Jersey, U.S.
- Died: February 28, 2009 (aged 81); Los Angeles, California, U.S.
- Occupation: Actor
- Years active: 1948–1985

José Hernández Bethencourt (June 6, 1927 – February 28, 2009), better known as Pepe Hern, was an American supporting actor, who usually played Spanish and Latino (primarily Mexican) roles throughout his career. Pepe Hern participated in nearly 50 films (most of which were premiered in television). He played his most important roles in Borderline and Make Haste to Live. He was brother of actor Tom Hernández.

== Biography ==
Pepe Hern was born on June 6, 1927 in New Jersey, to Spanish immigrants Domingo Hernández and Dominga Bethencourt. His parents were natives from Puerto de la Cruz on the island of Tenerife (Canary Islands). He had two older brothers, both of which were born in the Canary Islands. Pepe Hern debuted in his first film at the age of 21 in Bodyguard (1948). After this, his career spanned nearly 40 years. William A. Seiter gave to Hern his two most important roles of the 1950s in the films Borderline (1950) and Make Haste to Live (1954).

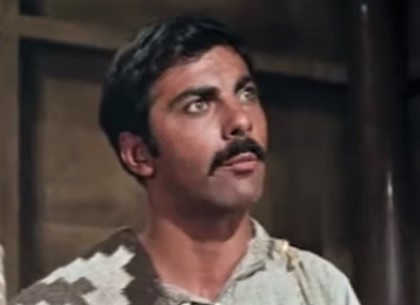
Pepe Hern in The Magnificent Seven

Later, in 1968, Hern had a role in Madigan. In the following decades, Hern portrayed a peasant in The Magnificent Seven (1960) and a priest in Joe Kidd (1972). This role was one of his last appearances in films.

It was on television where Hern maintained greater continuity and visibility, participating in several TV series episodes such as The Rifleman (1961–1962), The Fugitive (1963), I Spy (1966), The High Chaparral (1967), Bonanza (1964–1970), The Streets of San Francisco (1972), Lou Grant (1977), The Bionic Woman (1977), and Charlie's Angels (1979). In 1984, Hern appeared in an episode of Murder, She Wrote and an episode of Hill Street Blues.

In the 1960s, Hern taught in the Los Angeles School district, substituting for a teacher.

He died on February 28, 2009, in Los Angeles, California.

== Filmography ==
=== Film ===
This is a list of films of Pepe Hern

Year	Title	Role	Notes
1948	Bodyguard	Pachuco	Uncredited
1949	Knock on Any Door	Juan Rodríguez	Uncredited
1949	City Across the River	Pete	Uncredited
1949	Angels in Disguise	Bertie Spangler	
1950	Borderline	Pablo	
1950	The Capture	Policeman	Uncredited
1950	Crisis	Student	Uncredited
1950	The Furies	Feliz Herrera	Uncredited
1950	The Bandit Queen	Raphael, vigilant	Uncredited
1951	Heart of the Rockies	Rocky	
1951	My Favorite Spy	Bellboy	Uncredited
1952	Bugles in the Afternoon	Scout	Uncredited
1952	The Ring	Rick	
1952	Thunderbirds	Pvt. Jim Lastchance	
1953	San Antone	Mexican	Uncredited
1953	Appointment in Honduras	Stranger	Uncredited
1953	The Wild One	One of Chino's Boys	Uncredited
1954	Jubilee Trail	Ranch Hand	Uncredited
1954	Make Haste to Live	Rodolfo Gonzales	
1954	The Bamboo Prison	Ramírez	
1955	Hell's Island	Lalo	
1955	The Last Command	Seguin's Son	Uncredited
1956	Jaguar	Jorge	
1956	Santiago	Dragoon	Uncredited
1956	Back from Eternity	Attendant	Uncredited
1957	The Brothers Rico	Bank officer / Henchman	Uncredited
1960	The Magnificent Seven	Tomas	Uncredited
1961	Summer and Smoke	Nico	Uncredited
1962	13 West Street	Mexican	
1967	Stranger on the Run	Manolo	
1968	Madigan	Man	
1969	Change of Habit	Man in Scene 93	Uncredited
1970	The Out-of-Towners	Hijacker	Uncredited
1972	Joe Kidd	Priest	
1977	Fight for Your Life	Navarro	

=== TV series ===
This is a list of television series in which he has appeared.

Year	Title	Role	Episodes
1952	Fireside Theatre	Manuel Soledad	The Birds Are Walking
1952	Hopalong Cassidy	Actor	A Star Shall Rise
1955	Family Theater	Angelo	The Waiting Game
1955	Jungle Jim	Niron Kan	Junge Justice
1955	Cheyenne	Ricardo	Fury and Rio Hondo
1955	The Man Behind the Badge	Pedro	The Case of the Priceless Passport
1956	Chevron Hall of Stars	Pepe	Hour of Truth
1956–1958	Broken Arrow	Tokumo (1956) and Ruklai (1958)	Passage Deferred (1956) and Escape (1958)
1957	Zorro	Corporal / Cpl. Sanchez	Garcia's Secret Mission (1957) and Monastario Sets a Trap (1957)
1957	Conflict		Passage to Maranga
1959	Border Patrol	Algusto Herrera	Everglades Story
1959	The Restless Gun	Costa	Ride with the Devil
1959	The Many Loves of Dobie Gillis	Hernández	The General Cried at Dawn
1959	Four Star Playhouse	Diego	Desert Encounter
1959	Rawhide	Frank Volaro	Incident at Spanish Rock
1960	Surfside 6	Carlos	The Clown
1960	The Chevy Mystery Show	Mercado	The last six blooks
1961–1962	The Rifleman	Sleeper / Lazaro	Waste (in Parts 1 and 2. Episode of October 2, 1961 – playing as Sleeper-) and The Vaqueros (in 1962 – playing as Lázaro -)
1962	Thriller	Lt. Contreras	The Bride Who Died Twice
1963	The Fugitive	Cardinez	Smoke Screen
1963	Gunsmoke	Miguel	Extradition (2)
1964–1970	Bonanza	Maximo (1964) and Rojas (1970)	The Companeros and The Chief (episodes of 1964 and 1970)
1965	Run for your Life	Desk Clerk	The sex object (1965)
1965–1966	The Big Valley	Carlos, Pedro and Vaquero	Legend of a general (1), The Death merchant, the way to kill a killer (episodes of 1965 and 1966) respectively
1965	I Spy	Bellboy	Bellboy Turkish Delight
1966	Family Affair	Waiter	To Love with Buffy
1967	The High Chaparral	Teofilo	Mark of the turtle
1967	The Bionic Woman	Antonio Pinedo	Brain wash
1968	The Mod Squad	Amoroso	The Haeler
1970	The Flying Nun	Roul	My Sister, the Doctor
1971	O'Hara, U.S. Treasury	Santiago Bustamante	Operation: Payoff
1972	The Streets of San Francisco	Mr. Gomez, merchant who finds dead body	Hall of Mirrors
1973	Marcus Welby, M.D.	Maitre D'	A Cry in the Night
1974	Adam-12	Jesse Rodríguez	Krash
1977	Lou Grant	Navarro	Hostages
1979	Charlie's Angels	Gomes	Cruising Angels
1980	Quincy, M.E.	Judge Jules Aquilar	The Hope of Elkwood
1980	The White Shadow	Garcia	The Hitter
1981	Simon & Simon	Mendoza	The Least Dangerous Game
1984	Hill Street Blues	Store Owner #2	Intestinal fortitude
1984	Murder, She Wrote	Antonio (the pilot)	Paint Me a Murder (a scene; final appearance)
