= Maria O'Brien (actress) =

American actress and acting coach (1950–2026)

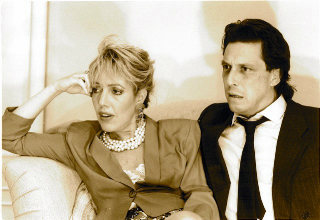
- O'Brien in 1999
- Born: August 14, 1950; Los Angeles, California, U.S.
- Died: February 24, 2026 (aged 75)
- Occupations: Actress, acting coach
- Parent(s): Edmond O'Brien; Olga San Juan
- Relatives: Brendan O'Brien (brother)

Maria O'Brien (August 14, 1950 – February 24, 2026) was an American actress and acting coach. She was the daughter of actors Edmond O'Brien and Olga San Juan, and sister of voice actor Brendan O'Brien.

== Career ==
O'Brien was best known as a character actress, but she also had a recurring role on a few television series, such as Ave 43 and The Life and Times of Eddie Roberts. She was also an acting coach on soap operas, such as Days of Our Lives, Sunset Beach, and Passions.

== Personal life ==
Born in Los Angeles on August 14, 1950, she was the sister of actor Brendan O'Brien and Bridget O'Brien Adelman. Her father, Edmond, was one of the first-known celebrities to be diagnosed with Alzheimer's disease, and her testimony before the U.S. Congress, and her advocacy, helped secure funding for the treatment of the disease. She died on February 24, 2026, at the age of 75, and had three children.
