= Olga San Juan =

American actress (1927–2009)

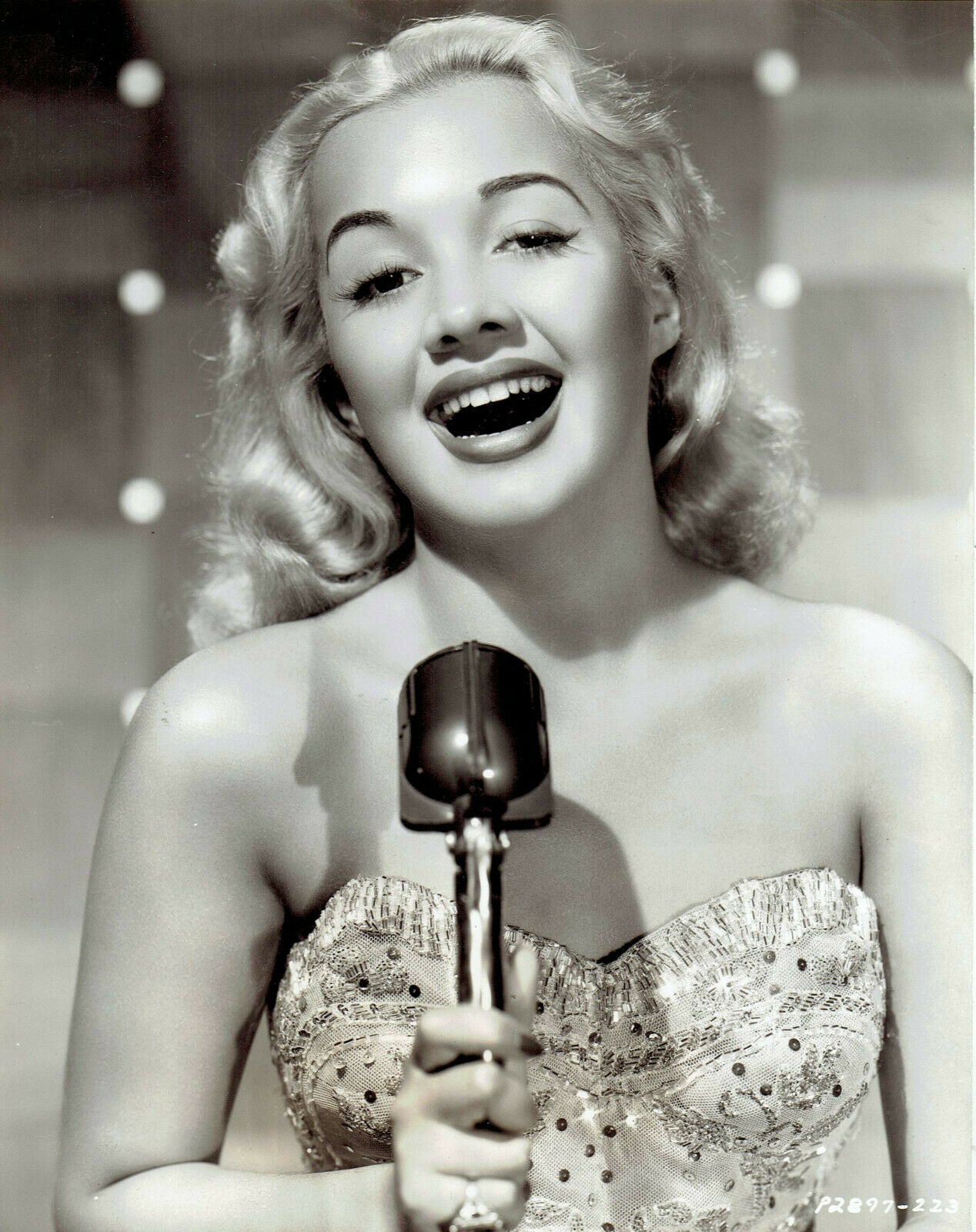
- San Juan in Variety Girl, 1947
- Born: March 16, 1927; New York City, U.S.
- Died: January 3, 2009 (aged 81); Burbank, California, U.S.
- Resting place: San Fernando Mission Cemetery
- Other name: The Puerto Rican Pepper Pot
- Occupations: Actress; dancer; comedian
- Years active: 1943–1960
- Spouse: Edmond O'Brien (m. 1948; div. 1976)
- Children: 3; including Maria and Brendan O'Brien

Olga San Juan (March 16, 1927 – January 3, 2009) was an American actress and comedian. Born in Brooklyn, she began her brief film career with Paramount Pictures after being scouted at Copacabana. She performed in several Hollywood musicals in the 1940s and on Broadway in Paint Your Wagon (1951).

== Early years ==
Olga San Juan was born on March 16, 1927, in Flatbush, Brooklyn, New York, to Puerto Rican parents Luis San Juan and Mercedes Arcaya. Her family went to Puerto Rico when she was three and then returned to New York City two years later, moving to East Harlem. Her singing career reportedly began when she performed with a group of schoolchildren from New York at the White House for President Franklin Delano Roosevelt. She left high school in ninth grade after her father became ill, performing at venues including El Morocco and the Hotel Astor.

== Career ==
San Juan was contracted to Paramount Pictures in 1943 after being scouted at the Copacabana and performing at the Paramount Theatre. In Blue Skies (1946), San Juan performs a dance to "Heat Wave" with Bing Crosby. She was especially keen to be cast as Amber La Vonne in Variety Girl (1947). In Variety Girl, a film about the film world, Amber La Vonne is desperate to make it in Hollywood; critics Charles Higham and Joel Greenberg call the film's "funniest scene" one in which San Juan's character causes a commotion in a restaurant just to be seen by the glitterati.

In the 1940s, San Juan mainly appeared in musicals as "a Latina entertainer or love interest". She was nicknamed the "Puerto Rican Pepper Pot", ostensibly "for her vivacious and spicy personality". Her last Hollywood film came out in 1949. According to critic Boze Hadleigh (writing under the pseudonym George Hadley-Garcia), San Juan's departure from film was driven by a shift in the public's musical preferences and by the end of World War II, which caused the Good Neighbor policy to wane.

In 1951, San Juan starred on Broadway in the Lerner and Loewe musical, Paint Your Wagon. She played Jennifer Rumson, a woman who finds gold and gets rich during the California Gold Rush.

== Personal life ==
San Juan was married to actor Edmond O'Brien. They had met at a publicity luncheon for Fox studios, and married on September 26, 1948, in Santa Barbara, California. They had three children, including television producer and actor Brendan O'Brien and actress and acting coach Maria O'Brien. O'Brien and San Juan divorced in 1976.

San Juan's health began to fail after a stroke in the 1970s. She died of kidney failure on January 3, 2009, at Providence St. Joseph Medical Center in Burbank, California. She was buried at San Fernando Mission Cemetery in Mission Hills, Los Angeles.

== Awards ==
- Donaldson Award for her work in Paint Your Wagon
- Screen Actors Guild Latino Legacy Award

== Filmography ==
Year	Title	Notes	Reference
1943	Caribbean Romance	Short	
1944	Rainbow Island		
1945	Bombalera	Short	
1945	Out of This World		
1945	Duffy's Tavern		
1945	Hollywood Victory Caravan	Short	
1945	The Little Witch	Short	
1946	Blue Skies		
1947	Variety Girl		
1948	Are You With It?		
1948	One Touch of Venus		
1948	The Countess of Monte Cristo		
1949	The Beautiful Blonde from Bashful Bend		
1960	The 3rd Voice		

== Sources ==
- Aylesworth, Thomas G. (1984). History of Movie Musicals. Hamlyn. ISBN 0-600-34754-0. OCLC 12512911.
- Bishop-Sanchez, Kathryn (October 20, 2016). Creating Carmen Miranda: Race, Camp, and Transnational Stardom. Vanderbilt University Press. ISBN 978-0-8265-2114-9.
- Hanson, Patricia King, ed. (1999). Catalog of Motion Pictures Produced in the United States: Feature Films 1941–1950 Indexes. American Film Institute; University of California Press. ISBN 978-0-520-21521-4.
- Parish, James Robert (1972). The Paramount Pretties. Arlington House Publishers. ISBN 0-87000-180-9. OCLC 539884.
- Richard, Alfred Charles (1993). Censorship and Hollywood's Hispanic Image: An Interpretive Filmography, 1936–1955. Greenwood Publishing Group. ISBN 0-313-28842-9. OCLC 27067799.
- Sadlier, Darlene J. (December 1, 2012). Americans All: Good Neighbor Cultural Diplomacy in World War II. University of Texas Press. ISBN 978-0-292-73930-7.
- Webb, Graham (July 13, 2020). Encyclopedia of American Short Films, 1926–1959. McFarland & Company. ISBN 978-1-4766-8118-4.
