= Roy Roberts =

American actor (1906–1975)

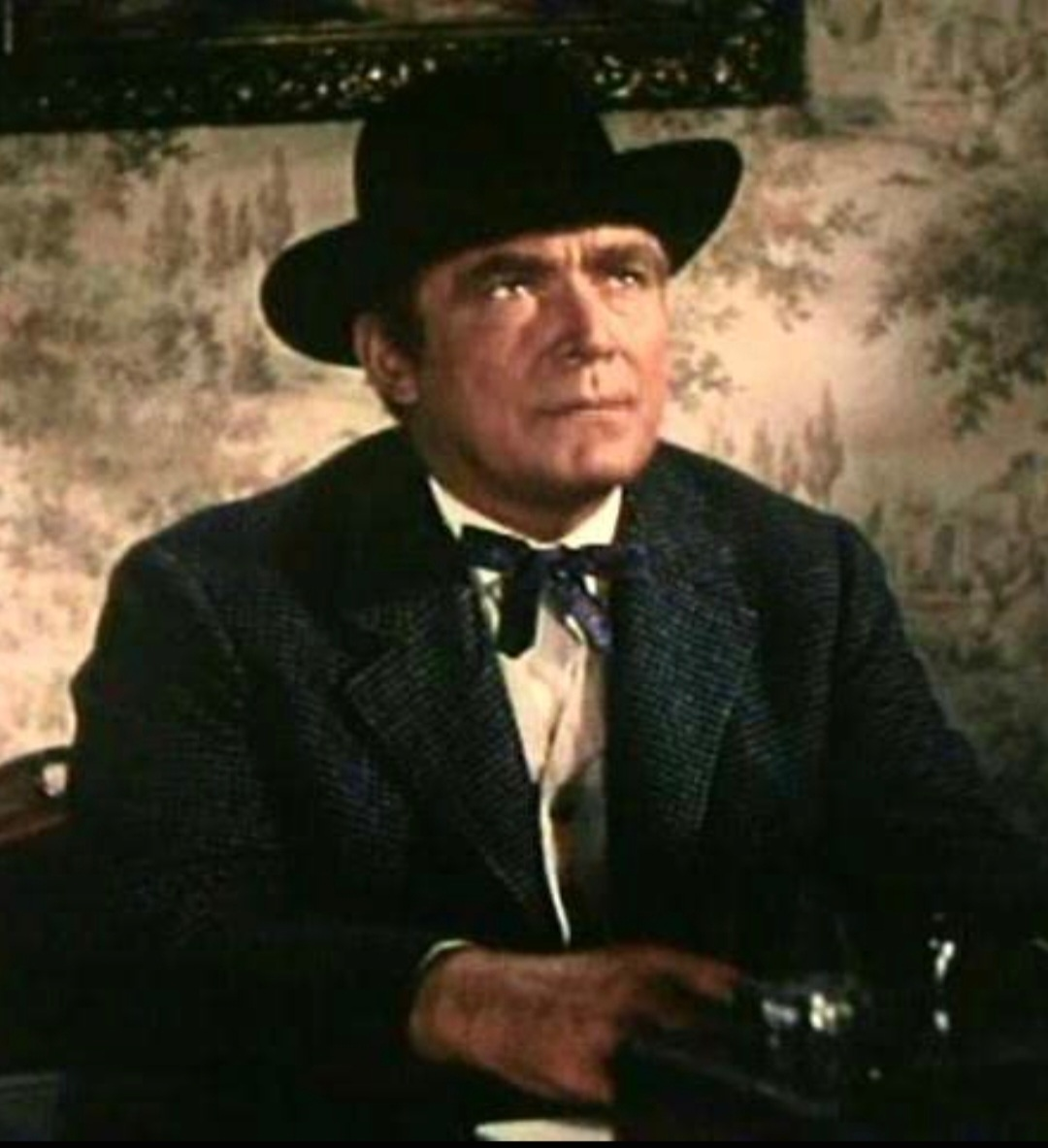
- Roberts in The Big Trees (1952)
- Born: Roy Barnes Jones; March 19, 1906; Dade City, Florida, U.S.
- Died: May 28, 1975 (aged 69); Los Angeles, California, U.S.
- Resting place: Greenwood Memorial Park, Fort Worth, Texas
- Occupation: Actor
- Years active: 1936–1975
- Spouse: Lillian Moore Tainter (m. 1947)

Roy Roberts (born Roy Barnes Jones; March 19, 1906 – May 28, 1975) was an American character actor. Over his more than 40-year career, he appeared in more than nine hundred productions on stage and screen.

== Life and career ==
Born in Tampa, Florida, Roberts began his acting career on stage with a stock company there. He left the Tampa company after a year to perform in touring stock theater for five years.

He first appeared on Broadway in May 1931 before making his motion picture debut in Gold Bricks, a 1936 two-reel comedy short released by 20th Century-Fox. He appeared in numerous films in secondary parts and returned to perform on Broadway in such productions as Twentieth Century, My Sister Eileen, and Carnival in Flanders until he began making guest appearances on television series. After appearing on Gale Storm's My Little Margie in 1956, he became part of several television series.

In a show that was the precursor to The Love Boat, Roberts played the ship's captain for four years in Storm's next hit, Oh! Susanna, which aired on CBS and ABC from 1956 to 1960. He guest-starred in scores of series, including the western-themed crime drama, Sheriff of Cochise, the western series, My Friend Flicka, The Life and Legend of Wyatt Earp (as Texas cattle baron Shanghai Pierce, and The Travels of Jaimie McPheeters, and Brian Keith's Cold War drama, Crusader.

Roberts appeared on four episodes of the CBS legal drama, Perry Mason, including the role of murderer Arthur Janeel in the 1961 episode, "The Case of the Malicious Mariner."

During the middle 1960s, Roberts was one of the most recognizable faces on television, and had recurring roles concurrently on a number of popular programs, including:

- Bank president Mr. Cheever on CBS's The Lucy Show
- John Cushing, president of the rival Merchants Bank in several episodes of The Beverly Hillbillies
- The judge in The Beverly Hillbillies "The Clampetts in Court"
- Railroad president Norman Curtis on CBS's Petticoat Junction
- Darrin's father Frank Stephens on ABC's Bewitched, alternating with actor Robert F. Simon depending upon availability.
- Banker Harry Bodkin & Dodge House Proprietor Mr. Dobie on CBS's Gunsmoke
- Neighbor Bruce MacDermott on ABC's Our Man Higgins
- Preston "Press" Wasco and Kelly on the NBC western, Laredo
- "Doc" on John Payne's The Restless Gun in the 1957 episode "Trail to Sunset"
- Banker George Bristol on NBC's Bonanza
- Admiral Rogers on McHale's Navy (in some episodes, his first name is given as "John" and in others his name is given as "Bruce").
- Capt. Walter A. Bascom in three episodes of the religion anthology series, Crossroads
- The Governor in a season two episode of Green Acres, "One of Our Assemblymen is Missing".

In the 1940s and 1950s, Roberts was a regular in many films noir, including Force of Evil (1948), He Walked by Night (1948), Nightmare Alley (1947), The Brasher Doubloon (1947), Borderline (1950) and The Enforcer (1951). In 1953, he appeared as Vincent Price's character's crooked business partner (and first victim) in House of Wax.

In 1956, he was Colonel Sam Sherman in The First Texan. In 1962 Roberts appeared as John Kemper on the TV western Lawman in the episode titled "Heritage of Hate". Also in 1962 he appeared as Senator Matson in the TV western show ‘’The Cheyenne Show’’, episode “The Vanishing Breed”.

He appeared in the neo-noirs The Outfit (1973) and Chinatown (1974). He also had a small role in the hit 1963 Stanley Kramer comedy, It's a Mad, Mad, Mad, Mad World as a police officer.

Roberts appeared in an episode of the situation comedy A Touch of Grace in 1973. His last television appearance was on the January 21, 1974, CBS broadcast of Here's Lucy. In that installment, "Lucy Is N.G. As An R.N.", Roberts played a veterinarian.

== Death ==
Roberts died in St. Vincent's Hospital in Los Angeles, California, of a heart attack on May 28, 1975, and was interred at Greenwood Memorial Park in Fort Worth, Texas.

== Selected filmography ==
- Guadalcanal Diary (1943) - Capt. James Cross
- The Fighting Sullivans (1944) - Father Francis
- Tampico (1944) - Crawford (uncredited)
- Roger Touhy, Gangster (1944) - Frank Williams - FBI Chief (uncredited)
- Wilson (1944) - Ike Hoover - Chief White House Butler (uncredited)
- Circumstantial Evidence (1945) - Marty Hannon
- The Caribbean Mystery (1945) - Capt. Van den Bark
- A Bell for Adano (1945) - Col. W.W. Middleton - Provost Marshal
- Within These Walls (1945) - Martin 'Marty' Deutsch
- Colonel Effingham's Raid (1946) - Army Capt. Rampey
- Behind Green Lights (1946) - Max Calvert
- Johnny Comes Flying Home (1946) - J.P. Hartley
- Strange Triangle (1946) - Harry Matthews
- Smoky (1946) - Jeff Nix
- It Shouldn't Happen to a Dog (1946) - 'Mitch' Mitchell
- My Darling Clementine (1946) - Mayor
- The Shocking Miss Pilgrim (1947) - Mr. Foster
- The Brasher Doubloon (1947) - Police Lt. Breeze
- The Foxes of Harrow (1947) - Tom Warren
- Nightmare Alley (1947) - McGraw - Final Carnival Owner (uncredited)
- Gentleman's Agreement (1947) - Mr. Calkins (uncredited)
- Daisy Kenyon (1947) - Quint - Dan's Attorney (uncredited)
- Captain from Castile (1947) - Capt. Alvarado
- Fury at Furnace Creek (1948) - Al Shanks
- The Gay Intruders (1948) - Charles McNulty
- Joan of Arc (1948) - Wandamme (Burgundian captain)
- No Minor Vices (1948) - Mr. Felton (uncredited)
- He Walked by Night (1948) - Police Capt. Breen
- Force of Evil (1948) - Ben Tucker
- Chicken Every Sunday (1949) - Harry Bowers
- Calamity Jane and Sam Bass (1949) - Marshal Peak
- Flaming Fury (1949) - Capt. S. Taplinger
- Miss Grant Takes Richmond (1949) - Construction Foreman Roberts (uncredited)
- The Reckless Moment (1949) - Nagel
- Chicago Deadline (1949) - Jerry Cavanaugh
- A Kiss for Corliss (1949) - Uncle George
- Bodyhold (1949) - Charlie Webster
- Chain Lightning (1950) - Maj. Gen. Hewitt
- Borderline (1950) - Harvey Gumbin
- The Palomino (1950) - Ben Lane
- Sierra (1950) - Sheriff Knudsen
- The Killer That Stalked New York (1950) - Mayor of New York
- Wyoming Mail (1950) - Charles De Haven
- The Second Face (1950) - Allan Wesson
- Stage to Tucson (1950) - Jim Maroon
- The Enforcer (1951) - Capt. Frank Nelson
- Santa Fe (1951) - Cole Sanders
- Fighting Coast Guard (1951) - Captain Gibbs
- I Was a Communist for the FBI (1951) - Father Novac
- The Tanks Are Coming (1951) - Major General (uncredited)
- The Man with a Cloak (1951) - Policeman
- My Favorite Spy (1951) - Johnson - FBI Man (uncredited)
- The Cimarron Kid (1952) - Pat Roberts
- The Big Trees (1952) - Judge Crenshaw
- Hoodlum Empire (1952) - Police Chief Thales
- Skirts Ahoy! (1952) - Capt. Graymont
- Cripple Creek (1952) - Marshal John Tetheroe
- One Minute to Zero (1952) - Lt. Gen. George Thomas (uncredited)
- Battles of Chief Pontiac (1952) - Maj. Gladwin
- Stars and Stripes Forever (1952) - Maj. George Porter Houston
- The Man Behind the Gun (1953) - Sen. Mark Sheldon
- San Antone (1953) - John Chisum
- The Lone Hand (1953) - Mr. Skaggs
- House of Wax (1953) - Matthew Burke
- The Glory Brigade (1953) - Sgt. Chuck Anderson
- Second Chance (1953) - Charley Malloy
- Sea of Lost Ships (1953) - Captain of the 'Eagle'
- Tumbleweed (1953) - Nick Buckley
- The Outlaw Stallion (1954) - Hagen
- Dawn at Socorro (1954) - Doc Jameson
- They Rode West (1954) - Sgt. Creever
- Big House, U.S.A. (1955) - Chief Ranger Will Erickson
- Stranger on Horseback (1955) - Sam Kettering
- Wyoming Renegades (1955) - Sheriff McVey
- The Eternal Sea (1955) - Review Board captain (uncredited)
- I Cover the Underworld (1955) - District Attorney
- The Last Command (1955) - Dr. Summerfield
- Backlash (1956) - Maj. Carson
- The First Texan (1956) - Col. Sam Sherman
- The Boss (1956) - Tim Brady
- Yaqui Drums (1956) - Matt Quigg
- The White Squaw (1956) - Edward Purvis
- The King and Four Queens (1956) - Sheriff Tom Larrabee
- The Restless Gun (1957) as Kitt Springer in Episode "The Gold Buckle"
- The Underwater City (1962) - Tim Graham
- Kid Galahad (1962) - Jerry Bathgate
- Lawman (1962 episode titled "Heritage of Hate") - John Kemper
- The Chapman Report (1962) - Alan Roby
- It's a Mad, Mad, Mad, Mad World (1963) - Policeman Outside Irwin & Ray's Garage
- Those Calloways (1965) - E.J. Fletcher
- I'll Take Sweden (1965) - Ship's Captain
- Hotel (1967) - Bailey
- Tammy and the Millionaire (1967) - Gov. Alden
- Cry for Poor Wally (1969) - Doctor
- Some Kind of a Nut (1969) - Mr. Burlingame
- The Million Dollar Duck (1971) - The Judge (uncredited)
- The Outfit (1973) - Sheriff Bob Caswell
- Chinatown (1974) - Mayor Bagby
- The Strongest Man in the World (1975) - Mr. Roberts (final film role)
