= Brendan O'Brien (actor) =

American actor (1962–2023)

- Born: Brendan James O'Brien; May 9, 1962; Hollywood, California, U.S.
- Died: March 23, 2023 (aged 60); California, U.S.
- Education: Loyola Marymount University
- Occupation: Actor
- Years active: 1972–2003; 2020–2021
- Spouse: Ingrid K. Behrens (m. 2000)
- Parents: Olga San Juan; Edmond O'Brien
- Relatives: Maria O'Brien (sister)
- Website: brendanobrien.com

Brendan James O'Brien (May 9, 1962 – March 23, 2023) was an American actor. He served as the original voice of Crash Bandicoot and various other character voices for the Crash Bandicoot video games during the Naughty Dog years.

== Early life ==
Brendan James O'Brien was born in Hollywood, California, on May 9, 1962. He was the son of actor Edmond O'Brien (1915–1985) and actress Olga San Juan (1927–2009). His two sisters are television producer Bridget O'Brien Adelman and actress Maria O'Brien (1950–2026).

He attended Loyola High School in East Los Angeles where he played guitar in various high school bands throughout his early years. He was also a graduate of the Loyola Marymount University.

== Career ==
O'Brien began his acting career in 1972 at ten years old, he was discovered by director Bernard L. Kowalski who cast him in his first acting role in the first episode of the television series The Streets of San Francisco, along with his father. His other live action credits was in the television film Honor Thy Father. He also acted in 3 Ninjas: High Noon at Mega Mountain, P.U.N.K.S., Race to Space, and Grindhouse.

He got the role of Crash Bandicoot after Joe Pearson suggested that he call Jason Rubin (who was looking for a voice artist). After going to the studio for the call (where his parents used to work), he got the role. The recordings that O'Brien did for Crash Bandicoot were done in an intimate setting at the Alfred Hitchcock Theater.

O'Brien also performed additional voices for the animated series adaptation of Spawn and Ralph Bakshi's Spicy City. He has also acted in several live action television shows such as Candid Camera and The Amazing Live Sea-Monkeys.

He went on a hiatus from acting in 2003; he returned to acting sixteen years later and appear in an episode of Riverdale as a math teacher and also had a small part in the TV mini-series The Slowest Show as a Male Millionaire. He was also in talks to have a role in Antonblast, a video game partly inspired by Crash Bandicoot; however, O'Brien died before this could occur.

== Personal life ==
Brendan O'Brien met his wife Ingrid K. Behrens in 1995; they married five years later in 2000 and remained married until his death.

=== Death ===
He died on March 23, 2023, at his home in California at the age of 60.

== Filmography ==
=== Film ===
Year	Title	Role	Notes
1973	Honor Thy Father	Child	TV movie
1989	Hollywood Chaos	Guido Luini	Indie film
1995	Get Street Smart: A Kid's Guide to Stranger Dangers	Capricorn's Dad (voice)	Short film
1996	The Legend of Galgameth	Heretic	
1997	Casper: A Spirited Beginning	Terrified Worker	Direct-to-video
1998	3 Ninjas: High Noon at Mega Mountain	Zed	
1999	P.U.N.K.S.	Repo Supervisor	
2000	The Trial of Old Drum	Brendan	TV movie
2000	Wild Grizzly	Earl	TV movie
2001	Race to Space	Centrifuge Technician	
2003	Grindhouse	Father Holloway	

=== Television ===
Year	Title	Role	Notes
1972	The Streets of San Francisco	Kid	Episode: "The Thirty-Year Pin"
1991	Candid Camera	Pincushion/Self	2 episodes
1992	The Amazing Live Sea-Monkeys	Milkman / Award Presenter	2 episodes
1997	Spicy City	Additional voices	Episode: "Love Is a Download"
1997–1999	Todd MacFarlane's Spawn	Additional voices	6 episodes
2020	Riverdale	Math Teacher	Episode: "Chapter Seventy-Four: Wicked Little Town"
2021	The Slowest Show	Male Millionaire	TV mini-series Episode: "Bowling Alley"; final role

=== Video games ===
Year	Title	Role	Notes
1996	Crash Bandicoot	Crash Bandicoot, Doctor Neo Cortex, Doctor Nitrus Brio	
1997	Crash Bandicoot 2: Cortex Strikes Back	Crash Bandicoot, Doctor Nitrus Brio, Doctor N. Gin, Komodo Moe, Tiny Tiger	
1998	Crash Bandicoot: Warped	Crash Bandicoot, Tiny Tiger, Doctor N. Gin	
1999	Crash Team Racing	Tiny Tiger, N. Gin, Pinstripe Potoroo	
2000	Crash Bash	Crash Bandicoot, Tiny Tiger, Doctor Nitrus Brio, Komodo Moe, Papu Papu	
2001	Crash Bandicoot: The Wrath of Cortex	Crash Bandicoot	
2002	Crash Bandicoot: The Huge Adventure	Crash Bandicoot	Archive recordings (uncredited)
2003	Crash Bandicoot 2: N-Tranced	Crash Bandicoot, Fake Crash	Archive recordings (uncredited)
2004	Crash Bandicoot Purple: Ripto's Rampage	Crash Bandicoot	Archive recordings (uncredited)
2016	Uncharted 4: A Thief's End	Crash Bandicoot	Archive recordings (uncredited)

== Crew work ==
Year	Title	Position	Notes
1987	Keep on Crusin'	Writer	TV series Contributing writer
1990	Guys Next-Door	Writer	TV series short Contributing writer
1994	The Secret World of Alex Mack	Drama coach, dialogue coach	4 episodes
1997	In Cold Sweat	Writer	Video; As Alex Smart
2000	Wild Grizzly	Composer	Television film
