= Borderline (1950 film) =

Film by William A. Seiter

- Directed by: William A. Seiter
- Written by: Devery Freeman
- Produced by: Milton H. Bren
- Starring: Fred MacMurray; Claire Trevor
- Cinematography: Lucien Andriot
- Edited by: Harry Keller
- Music by: Hans J. Salter
- Color process: Black and white
- Production companies: Milton H. Bren and William A. Seiter Productions; Borderline Pictures Corporation
- Distributed by: Universal Pictures
- Release dates: January 25, 1950 (Philadelphia); March 5, 1950 (New York)
- Running time: 88 minutes
- Country: United States
- Language: English
- Budget: $775,000

Borderline is a 1950 American crime film noir directed by William A. Seiter and starring Fred MacMurray and Claire Trevor. It was filmed from late May to early July 1949 at Republic Studios.

== Plot ==
Pete Ritchie runs a narcotics smuggling operation to the U.S. from Mexico that the Los Angeles Police Department and the federal government have unsuccessfully tried to stop. Because of Ritchie's careful operating procedures, federal authorities have not determined the identities of his sources or customers and are desperate for a breakthrough. As a last resort, Madeleine Haley, an LAPD officer and former OSS operative, is sent undercover to Mexico to charm her way into Ritchie's confidence. Once there, Haley establishes contact with Ritchie's gang but is kidnapped by Johnny Macklin, a federal agent posing as a hoodlum working for Ritchie's rival who also steals a load of Ritchie's narcotics. Haley is unaware that Macklin is also undercover, but she joins him on a smuggling trip to maintain her cover and nab the criminals, with Ritchie in hot pursuit.

== Cast ==
- Fred MacMurray as Johnny McEvoy, posing as Johnny Macklin
- Claire Trevor as Madeleine Haley, posing as Gladys LaRue
- Raymond Burr as Pete Ritchie
- Jose Torvay as Miguel
- Morris Ankrum as Bill Whittaker
- Roy Roberts as Harvey Gumbin
- Don Diamond as Deusik
- Nacho Galindo as Porfirio
- Pepe Hern as Pablo
- Grazia Narciso as Porfirio's wife
- Clifton Young as Suspect
- Charles Lane as Peterson, customs officer
- Johnny Indrisano as Gumbin's henchman
- Chris-Pin Martin as Pepi, hotel clerk

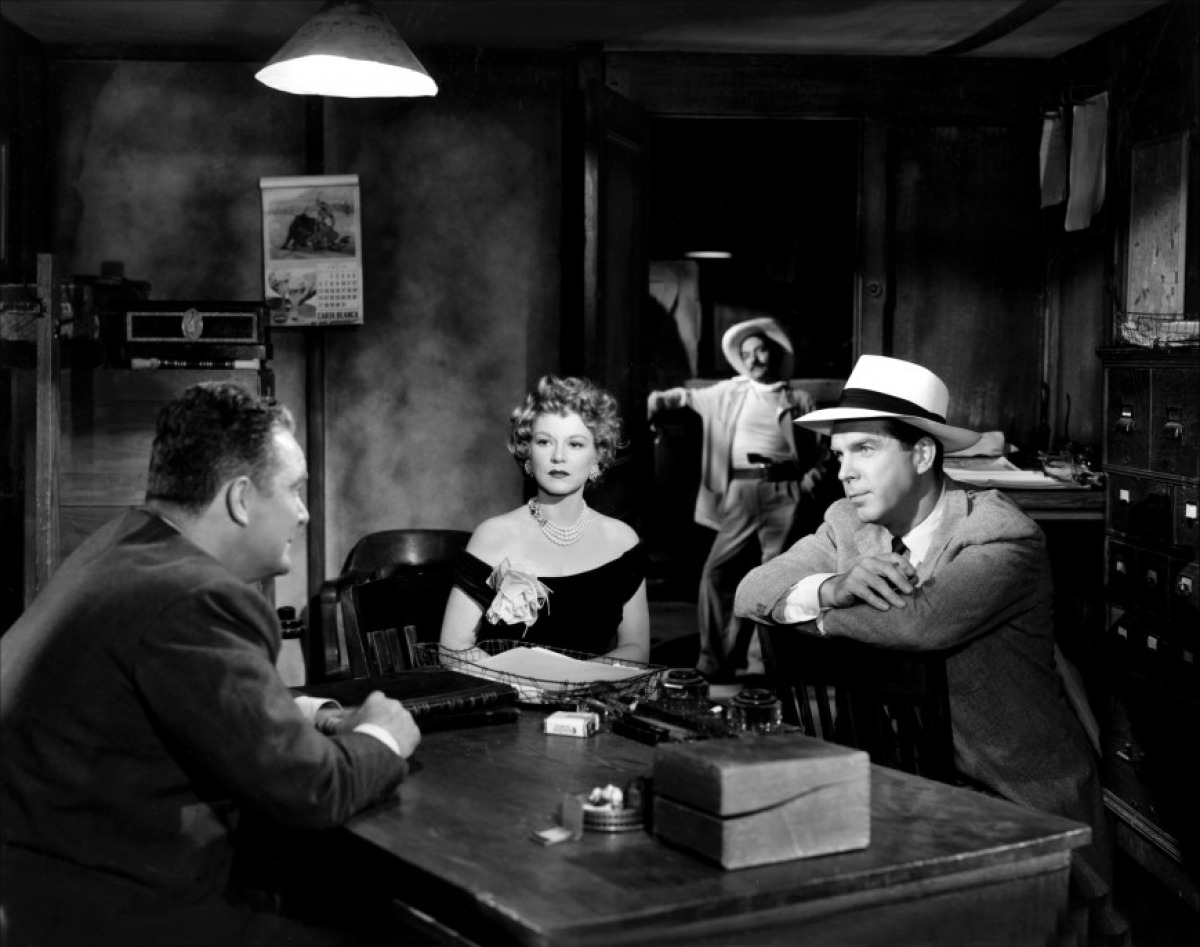
Roy Roberts, Claire Trevor, Jose Torvay and Fred MacMurray in Borderline

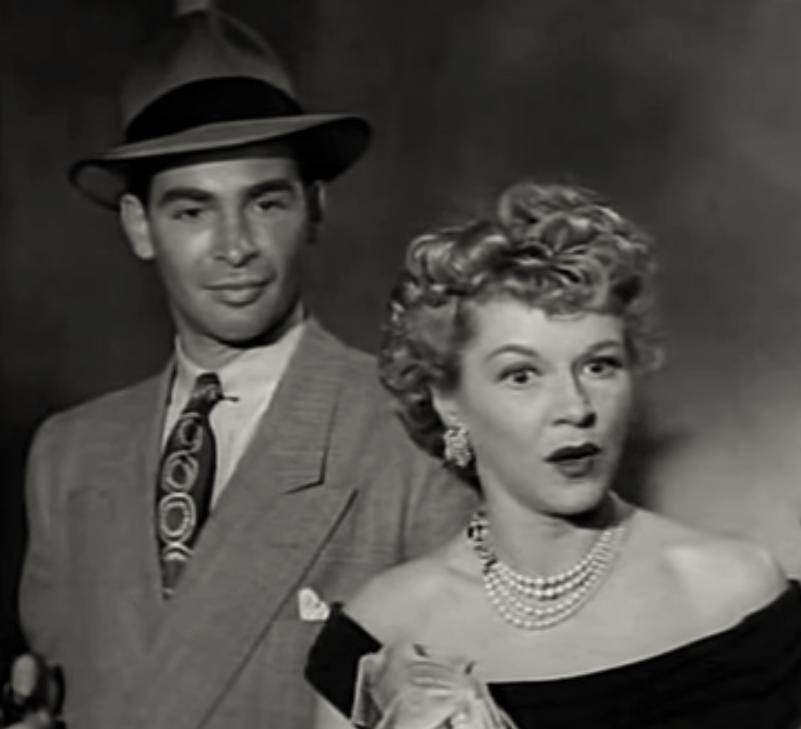
Richard Irving and Claire Trevor

== Production ==
The film is based on a story written by Norman Krasna. Fred MacMurray, director William Seiter and producer Milton Bren partnered to finance the film with their own money by creating Borderline Productions, Inc. In April 1949, Claire Trevor, Bren's wife and a recent Academy Award winner for her role in Key Largo, was announced as the female lead. The production team tried unsuccessfully to sign popular Mexican comedian Cantinflas for a prominent role in the film.

A portable glass soundproofed booth was constructed to allow as many as 46 members of the public to watch the location filming at a time, with each group's session lasting one hour. Filming began on May 26, 1949.

== Reception ==
The film's world premiere was held at the Aldine Theater in Philadelphia on January 25, 1950, with Claire Trevor in attendance.

In a contemporary review for The New York Times, critic A. H. Weiler wrote: "No matter what one calls 'Borderline,' it cannot be termed a misnomer. For the newcomer ... skips back and forth across the borderline between melodrama and comedy with a curious indecision. As a result, this yarn about dope smugglers is neither exciting cops-and-gangsters fare nor a rib-tickling travesty of same. It's merely a long chase between Lower California and Los Angeles, but the plot, unlike the road, hasn't a novel twist in it. ... Routine, as a matter of fact, is the word for 'Borderline.'"

Reviewer Mae Tinee of the Chicago Tribune wrote: "The stars handle their roles with the poise of long experience. The action is brisk and well salted with provocative lines and situations. The film as a whole is unpretentious, with interesting and authentic background shots, and most audiences will find it moderately engrossing entertainment."

Writing in The Philadelphia Inquirer, critic Mildred Martin saw parallels between the film and It Happened One Night but added: "The bedroom angle gets in the way of the action. and vice versa. But in any case, the basic business of Devery Freeman's script is too far-fetched to hold much interest. A good deal of padding has gone into the film, too, long stretches being devoted to things that have no bearing whatever on the story proper and the dawn of love for the two singularly obtuse agents."

== See also ==
- Public domain film
- List of American films of 1950
- List of films in the public domain in the United States
