= Rio Bravo (film) =

1959 film

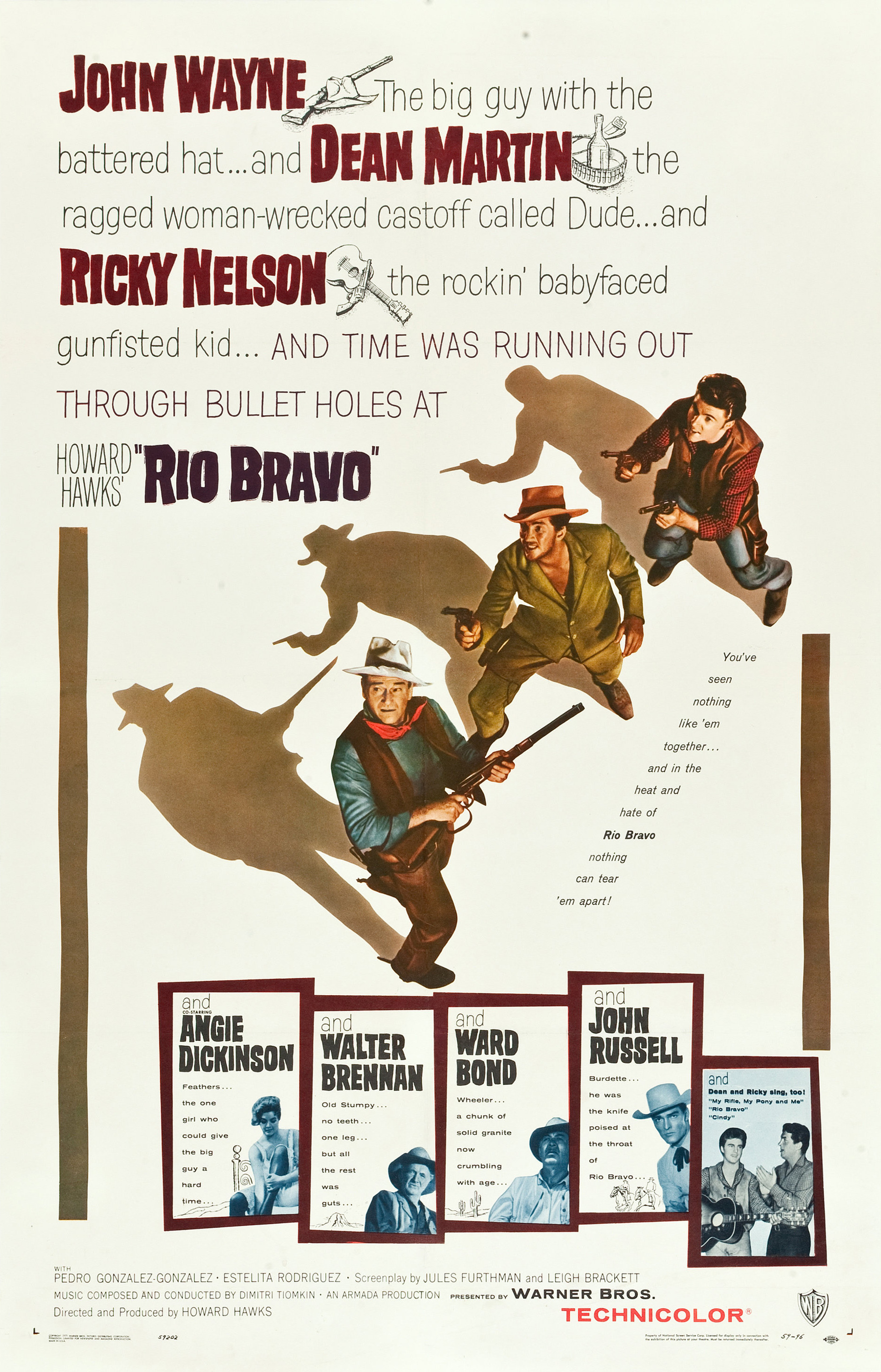
- Theatrical release poster
- Directed by: Howard Hawks
- Screenplay by: Jules Furthman; Leigh Brackett
- Based on: "Rio Bravo" by B.H. McCampbell
- Produced by: Howard Hawks
- Starring: John Wayne; Dean Martin; Ricky Nelson; Angie Dickinson; Walter Brennan; Ward Bond; John Russell; Pedro Gonzalez Gonzalez; Estelita Rodriguez
- Cinematography: Russell Harlan
- Edited by: Folmar Blangsted
- Music by: Dimitri Tiomkin; Lyrics: Paul Francis Webster
- Production company: Armada Productions
- Distributed by: Warner Bros. Pictures
- Release date: April 4, 1959
- Running time: 141 minutes
- Country: United States
- Languages: English; Spanish
- Budget: $1,214,899
- Box office: $5.75 million (US and Canada rentals)

Rio Bravo is a 1959 American Western film directed and produced by Howard Hawks and starring John Wayne, Dean Martin, Angie Dickinson, Ricky Nelson, Walter Brennan, and Ward Bond. Written by Jules Furthman and Leigh Brackett, based on the short story "Rio Bravo" by B.H. McCampbell, the film stars Wayne as a Texan sheriff who arrests the brother of a powerful local rancher for murder and then has to hold the man in jail until a U.S. marshal can arrive. With the help of a lame old man, a drunk, and a young gunfighter, they hold off the rancher's gang. Rio Bravo was filmed on location at Old Tucson Studios outside Tucson, Arizona, in Eastmancolor, with film processing provided by Technicolor.

It has been met with critical acclaim, with many considering one of Hawks' best films. It has frequently been considered one of the greatest films of all time.

In 2014, Rio Bravo was deemed "culturally, historically or aesthetically significant" by the Library of Congress and selected for preservation in the National Film Registry.

== Plot ==
Joe Burdette, the spoiled younger brother of wealthy land baron Nathan Burdette, taunts town drunk Dude by tossing money into a spittoon. The sheriff, John T. Chance, stops Dude from reaching into the spittoon, prompting Dude to lash out and knock Chance unconscious. Joe beats up Dude for fun, while two of his friends hold Dude, then shoots and kills an unarmed bystander who had tried to intervene. Chance recovers, follows Joe into another saloon, and with help from a penitent Dude, arrests Joe for murder.

Chance's friend Pat Wheeler attempts to enter town with a wagon train of supplies and dynamite, but has to force his way through Nathan Burdette's men. Chance reveals that Dude (who used to be a deputy before he became a drunk), his lame old deputy Stumpy, and he are all that stand between Nathan's small army and Joe, whom they wish to free. Chance notices young gunslinger Colorado Ryan in Wheeler's wagon train, but Colorado promises he does not want to start any trouble.

That night, Carlos Robante, the owner of the local hotel, warns Chance that Wheeler is trying to recruit fighters. Chance tries to stop Wheeler, not wanting anyone to get hurt on his account. Wheeler asks if Colorado could help, but Colorado declines, feeling that it is not his fight. Chance then notices a rigged card game at the hotel. Recognizing one of the players as "Feathers", the widow of a cheating gambler, Chance confronts her, but Colorado reveals that another player is the cheater.

Out in the street, Wheeler is gunned down. Chance and Dude pursue the killer into Nathan's saloon, and Chance allows Dude to prove himself and confront the killer, earning the respect of Nathan's men. Colorado and the rest of Wheeler's men are forced to stay in town to await a court order releasing Wheeler's possessions, and the wagons are left behind the Burdette warehouse. After Feathers secretly stays up all night with a shotgun to guard Chance, an irritated Chance orders Feathers to leave town for her safety. She refuses, and the two begin to bond.

Nathan himself rides into town. Stumpy, having old grudges against Nathan for taking his land, threatens to shoot Joe if any trouble starts around the jail. In response, Nathan has his saloon musicians repeatedly play "El Degüello", a.k.a. "The Cutthroat Song". Colorado realizes the song means Nathan will show no mercy and warns Chance.

Chance gives Dude back his old guns, some clothes, and a black hat he left behind when he became a drunkard. Dude also gets a shave, trying to start afresh. Unfortunately, Stumpy does not recognize Dude when he returns and shoots at him, shattering Dude's nerves. The next day, Dude is still shaky and is ambushed by Burdette's men, who threaten to kill him unless Chance lets Joe go. Colorado and Feathers distract the men long enough for Chance to get his rifle, and Colorado and he shoot down the men and free Dude. Dude thinks about quitting and letting Colorado take his place, but when he hears "El Degüello" being played, he resolves to see the thing through to the end.

Dude and Chance return to the hotel so Dude can take a bath. Burdette's men capture Carlos' wife Consuelo and deliberately make her scream, which lures Dude and Chance into a trap. Dude tells Chance to take the men to the jail, under the pretext that Stumpy would let Joe out. Stumpy opens fire, though, as Dude secretly predicted. In the chaos, some men drag Dude off to Nathan, who demands a trade—Dude for Joe. Chance agrees, but brings Colorado as backup. Dude and Joe brawl during the trade and a firefight ensues. Stumpy throws some sticks of dynamite from the wagons into the warehouse where Burdette and his men are holed up; Chance and Dude detonate them with their guns, abruptly ending the fight.

With both Burdettes and their few surviving gunmen in jail, Chance finally spends some time with Feathers and admits his feelings for her. Colorado volunteers to guard the jail, allowing Stumpy and Dude to enjoy a night out in the town.

== Cast ==
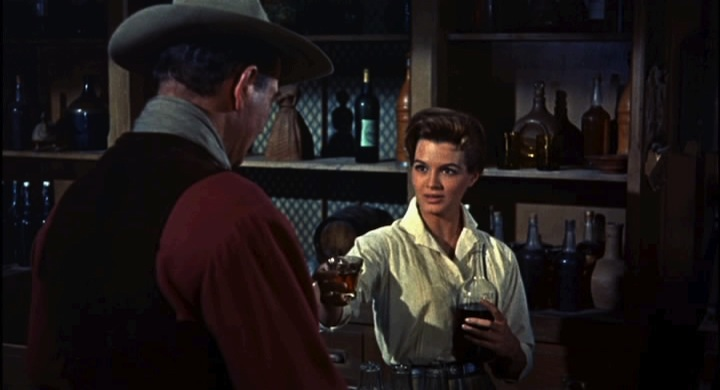
John Wayne and Angie Dickinson in Rio Bravo

- John Wayne as John T. Chance
- Dean Martin as Dude
- Angie Dickinson as Feathers
- Ricky Nelson as Colorado Ryan
- Walter Brennan as Stumpy
- Ward Bond as Pat Wheeler
- John Russell as Nathan Burdette
- Pedro Gonzalez Gonzalez as Carlos Robante
- Estelita Rodriguez as Consuela Robante
- Claude Akins as Joe Burdette
- Bing Russell as the cowboy killed by Joe Burdette at the start of the movie (uncredited)
- Nesdon Booth as Clark
- Walter Barnes as Charlie the Bartender (uncredited)
- James B. Leong as Burt (uncredited)

Malcolm Atterbury and Harry Carey Jr. also receive screen credits in the film's opening, but their scenes were deleted from the final film.

== Production ==
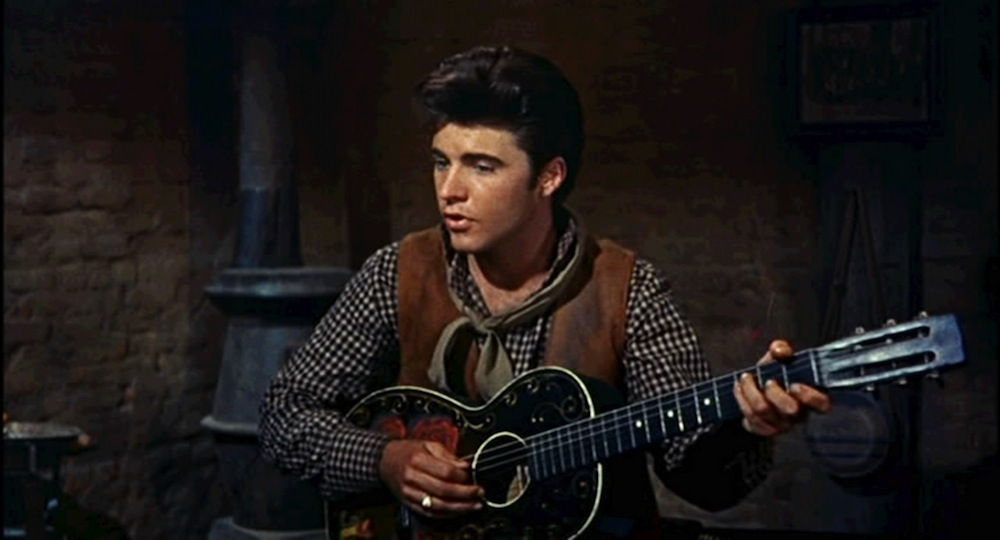
Ricky Nelson performing the song "Get Along Home, Cindy" in Rio Bravo

Exteriors for the film were shot at Old Tucson Studios, just outside Tucson. Filming took place in the summer of 1958, and the movie's credits gave 1958 for the copyright; the film was released in March 1959.

Rio Bravo is often regarded as one of Hawks' best and features a long opening scene that includes no dialogue. The film received favorable reviews and was successful, taking in US$5.75 million, the highest-grossing Western of 1959.

A brief clip from Rio Bravo was among the archival footage later incorporated into the opening sequence of Wayne's last film, The Shootist, to illustrate the backstory of Wayne's character.

As was often the case in a John Wayne western, Wayne wore his "Red River D" belt buckle in the movie. It is clearly visible in the scene when Nathan Burdette comes to visit his brother Joe in the jail where he is being held for the U.S. marshal, about 60 minutes into the film, and again in the scene where Wayne's John Chance, Ricky Nelson's Colorado, and Angie Dickinson's Feathers deal with three of Burdette's men in front of the hotel.

The story was credited to "B.H. McCampbell". According to Todd McCarthy's 1997 biography, Howard Hawks: The Grey Fox of Hollywood, this was actually Hawks' eldest daughter, Barbara Hawks McCampbell. Her contribution was the idea of using dynamite in the final shootout.

== Soundtrack ==
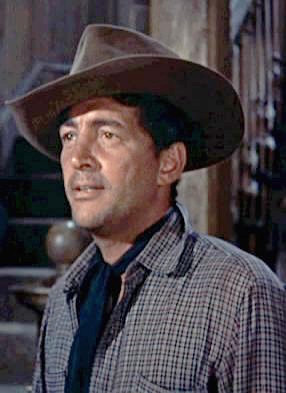
Dean Martin

The musical score was composed by Dimitri Tiomkin. His score includes the hauntingly ominous "El Degüello" theme, which is heard several times. The Colorado character identifies the tune as "The Cutthroat Song". He relates that the song was played on the orders of General Antonio López de Santa Anna to the Texans holed up in the Alamo to signify that no quarter would be given to them. The tune was used in Wayne's film The Alamo (1960). Composer Ennio Morricone recalled that director Sergio Leone asked him to write "Dimitri Tiomkin music" for A Fistful of Dollars. The trumpet theme is similar to Tiomkin's "Degüello" (the Italian title of Rio Bravo was Un dollaro d'onore, A Dollar of Honor).

Because the film starred a crooner, Martin, and a teen idol, Nelson, Hawks included three songs in the soundtrack. Before the big showdown, in the jailhouse, Martin sings "My Rifle, My Pony, and Me" (which contains new lyrics by Webster to a Tiomkin tune that appeared in Red River), accompanied by Nelson, after which Nelson sings a brief version of "Get Along Home, Cindy", accompanied by Martin and Brennan. Over the closing credits, Martin, backed by the Nelson Riddle Orchestra, sings a specially composed song, "Rio Bravo", written by Tiomkin with lyrics by Paul Francis Webster. Nelson later paid homage to both the film and his character Colorado by including the song "Restless Kid" on his 1959 LP, Ricky Sings Again.

Members of the Western Writers of America chose "My Rifle, My Pony, and Me" as one of the Top 100 Western songs of all time.

== High Noon debate ==
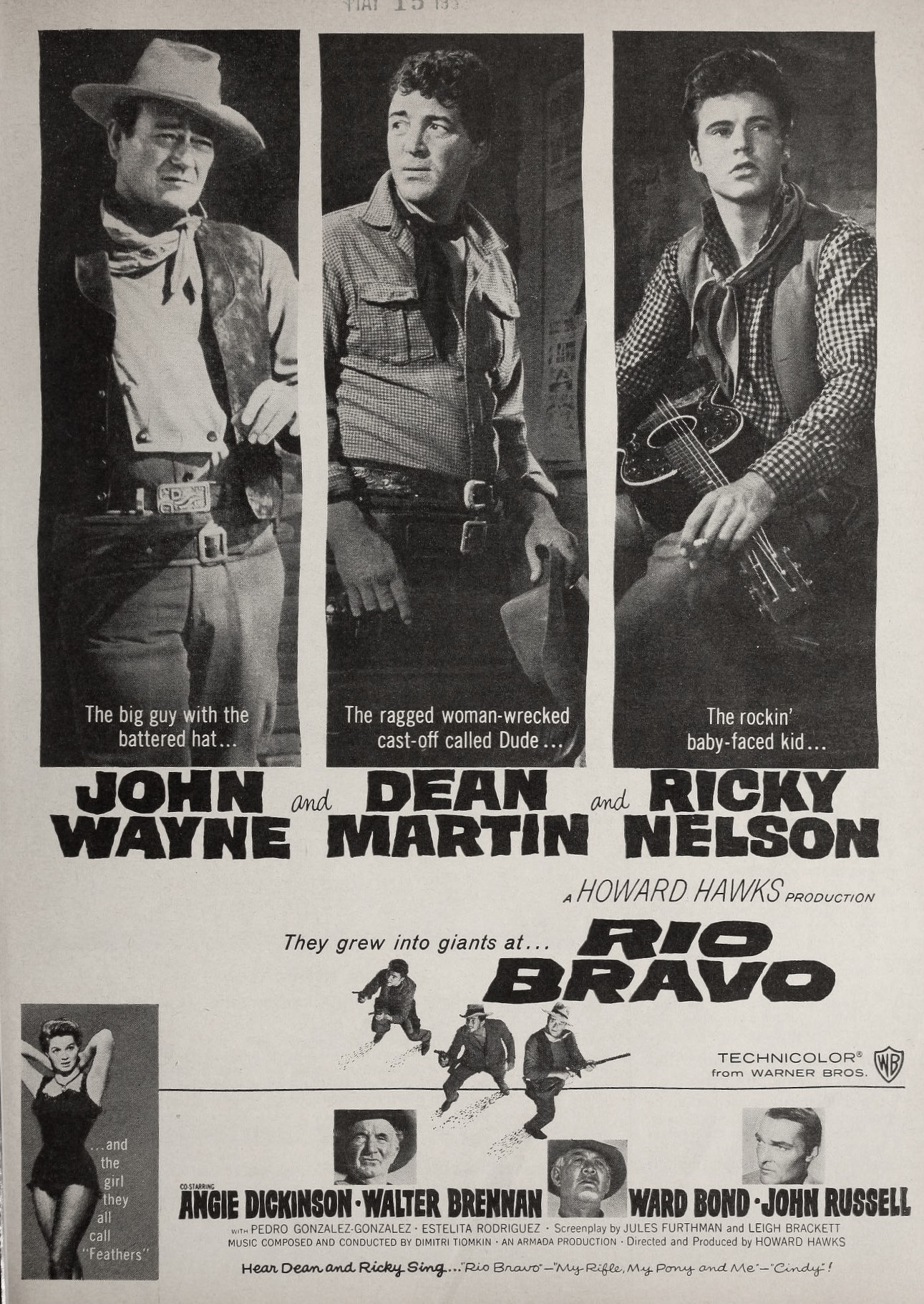
Theatrical poster, 1959

The film was made as a response to High Noon, which is sometimes thought to be an allegory for blacklisting in Hollywood, as well as a critique of McCarthyism. Wayne later called High Noon "un-American" and said he did not regret helping run the writer, Carl Foreman, out of the country. Director Howard Hawks went on the record to criticize High Noon by saying, "I didn't think a good sheriff was going to go running around town like a chicken with his head cut off asking for help, and finally his Quaker wife had to save him." According to film historian Emanuel Levy, Wayne and Hawks teamed up deliberately to rebut High Noon by telling a somewhat similar story their own way, portraying a hero who does not show fear or inner conflict and who never repudiates his commitment to public duty, while only allying himself with capable people, despite offers of help from many other characters. Chance also cites concerns for the safety of those who offer to help, and his fears are confirmed when the first such offer results in the character being quickly killed. In Rio Bravo, Chance is surrounded by allies—a deputy who is brave and good with a gun, despite recovering from alcoholism (Dude); a young, untried, but self-assured gunfighter (Colorado); a limping, crippled old man who is doggedly loyal (Stumpy); a Mexican innkeeper (Carlos) and his wife (Consuela); and an attractive young woman (Feathers)—and repeatedly turns down aid from anyone who he does not think is capable of helping him.

== Reception and Legacy ==
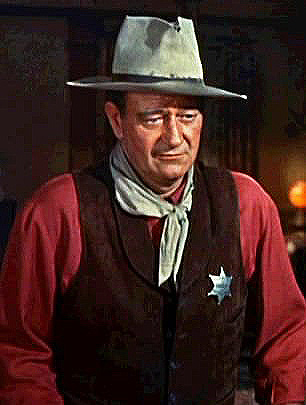
John Wayne

In the United Kingdom, Rio Bravo was not originally even reviewed for Sight & Sound; Leslie Halliwell gave the film two out of four stars in his Film Guide, describing it as a "cheerfully overlong and slow-moving Western" that was nevertheless "very watchable for those with time to spare". The film was taken more seriously by British critics such as Robin Wood, who rated it as his top film of all time and wrote a book on it in 2003 for the British Film Institute, publishers of Sight & Sound. Pauline Kael called the film "silly, but with zest; there are some fine action sequences, and the performers seem to be enjoying their roles." It was added to Roger Ebert's Great Movies list in 2009. Ebert said of the film "To watch Rio Bravo is to see a master at work. The film is seamless. There is not one shot that is wrong." Rio Bravo was the second-highest-ranking Western (63rd overall) in the 2012 Sight & Sound critics' poll of the greatest films ever made. In 2008, the American Film Institute nominated this film for its Top 10 Western Films list.

On the review aggregator website Rotten Tomatoes, 95% of 44 critics' reviews are positive, with an average rating of 8.4/10. The website's consensus reads: "Rio Bravo finds director Howard Hawks – and his stellar ensemble cast – working at peak performance, and the end result is a towering classic of the Western genre." Metacritic, which uses a weighted average, assigned the film a score of 93 out of 100, based on 18 critics, indicating "universal acclaim".

Director Quentin Tarantino called Rio Bravo his "favorite 'hangout' movie". He once said that if his date does not like the film, there will be no relationship. In the 2022 Sight and Sound critic's poll, it was tied for 101st place with The House is Black and Vagabond. It was the third highest ranking Western on the critic's poll.

Howard Hawks went on to direct two loose variations of Rio Bravo with the idea of a sheriff defending his office against belligerent outlaws. John Wayne starred in both films, released as El Dorado in 1966, with Robert Mitchum playing a variation of Dean Martin's original role, and Rio Lobo in 1970.

The 1976 film Assault on Precinct 13 directed by John Carpenter was inspired by the story and setting of Rio Bravo.

== Music ==
- "My Rifle, My Pony and Me"—sung by Dean Martin and Ricky Nelson
- "Cindy"—sung by Ricky Nelson, Dean Martin, and Walter Brennan
- "Rio Bravo"—sung by Dean Martin (end credits)

== Comic-book adaptation ==
- Dell Four Color #1018 (June 1959), illustrated by Alex Toth.

== Theme park attractions ==
In 2002, a flume ride Rio Bravo, named after the film, opened at Parque Warner Madrid. Earlier in 1998, a similar flume ride with the same name and theme was planned for Warner Bros. Movie World on the Gold Coast, Australia, but it was ultimately opened under the name Wild Wild West, based on the 1999 film of the same title.

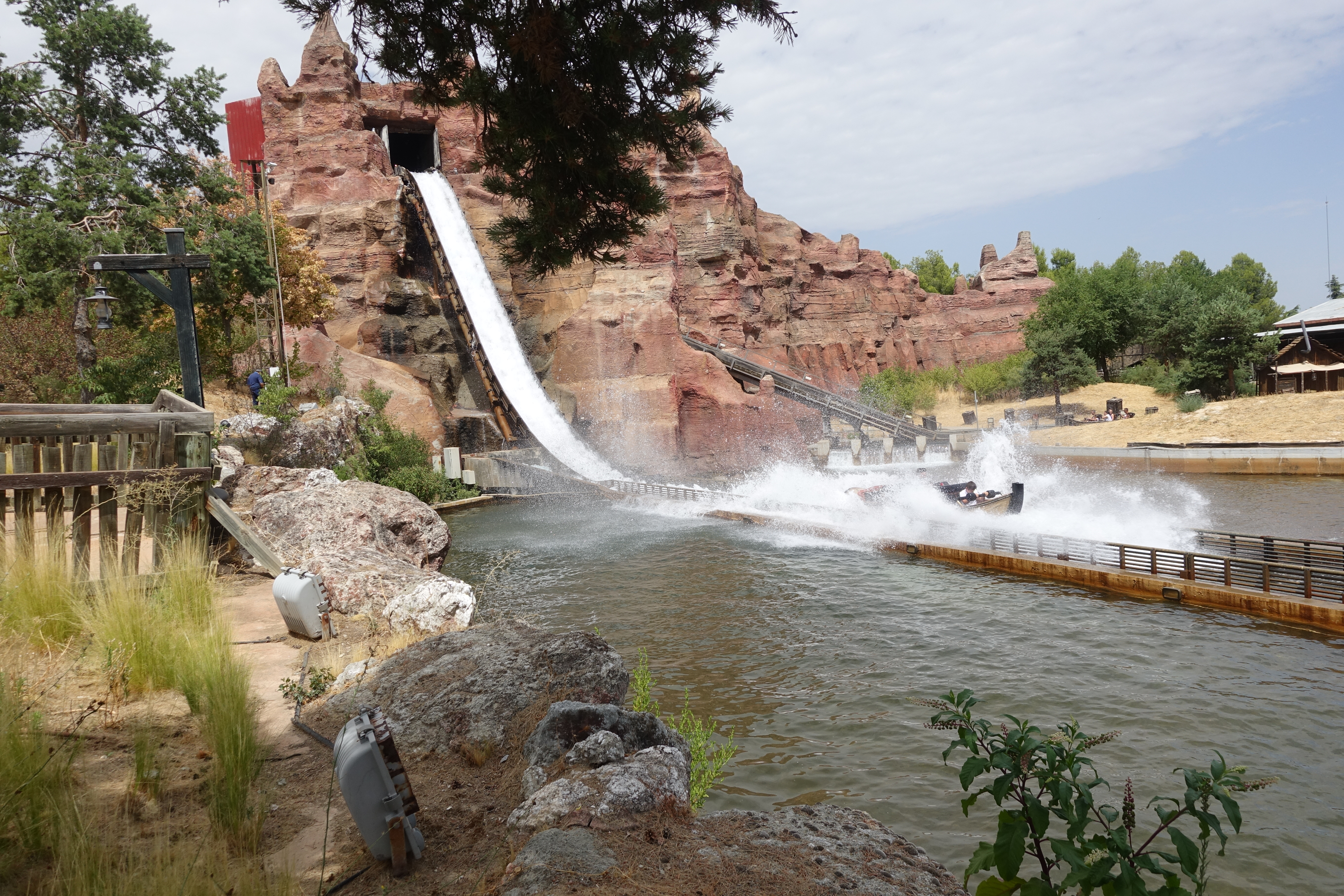
Rio Bravo at Parque Warner Madrid
