= Spicy City =

Television series

- Raven in Spicy City
- Genre: Anthology; Science fiction
- Created by: Ralph Bakshi
- Written by: Various
- Directed by: Various
- Voices of: Michelle Phillips
- Composer: John McCarthy
- Country of origin: United States
- Original language: English
- No. of seasons: 1
- No. of episodes: 6

Production
- Executive producer: Ralph Bakshi
- Producer: Catherine Winder
- Running time: 25 minutes
- Production companies: HBO Animation; HBO Entertainment

Original release
- Network: HBO
- Release: July 11 – August 22, 1997

Spicy City is an American adult animated science fiction television series which was created by Ralph Bakshi for HBO. The first of two adult animated series to air on HBO in the same year, (Note: Although it was not aired on Adult Swim or Cartoon Network, as Adult Swim was not founded until 2001, Spicy City and Spawn marked the only series administered by HBO with adult-oriented themes.) the show serves as an anthology series in a similar format as television programs such as The Twilight Zone and Tales from the Crypt. The series premiered on July 11, 1997, and ended on August 22, with a total of 6 episodes over the course of 1 season.

== Premise ==
The plot was described as a science fiction anthology series set in a futuristic city with a steamy side. Each episode is introduced by Raven, a nightclub hostess who also makes brief appearances in the tales.

== Cast ==
- Michelle Phillips as Raven
- James Kean as Lem
- Barry Stigler as Boxer
- Mary Mara as Alice Kerchief / Geisha
- John Hostetter as Jake
- Vince Melocchi as Shark
- Alex Fernandez as Armando "Mano" Mantio
- Cecilia Noël as Red Beans
- James Hanes as Big Vinnie
- Ralph Bakshi as Stevie / Connelly / Goldblum
- Pamala Tyson as Bruja / Ebony / Venus Sartori
- Tuesday Knight as Prostitute / Virus
- James Keane as Flaxson
- Darrell Kunitomi as Loh
- Grace Zandarski as Driver
- James Asher as Harry
- Tasia Valenza as Margo
- Tony Amendola as Skankmeyer
- Julia DeMita as Frenchy
- Rick Najera as Vic Guapo
- Lewis Arquette as Farfelson / Corbin
- Jennifer Darling as Elvira
- E. G. Daily as Nisa Lolita
- Joey Camen as Max
- Michael Yama as Otaku
- Brock Peters as Bird
- Charlie Adler as Additional voices
- Dan Castellaneta as Additional voices
- Tress MacNeille as Additional voices
- Matt K. Miller as Additional voices
- Andy Philpot as Additional Voices
- Marnie Mosiman as Additional voices
- Brendan O'Brien as Additional voices
- David Fennoy as Additional voices
- Danny Mann as Additional voices

== Production ==
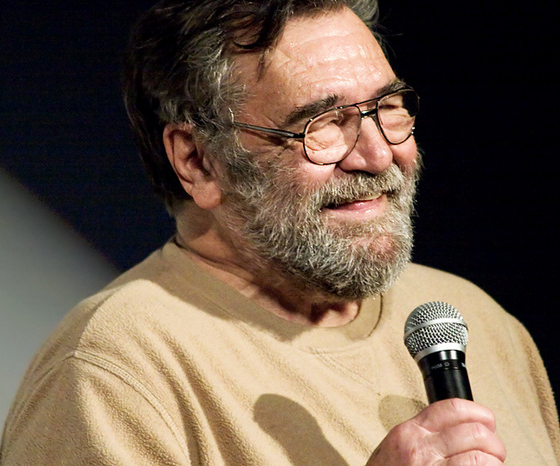
Bakshi in January 2009

Discussions involving a series based upon Trey Parker and Matt Stone's video Christmas card Jesus vs. Santa (which would become South Park) led HBO to contact Ralph Bakshi in order to produce the first animated series targeted specifically toward adults. Bakshi enlisted a team of writers, including (besides his son Preston) Asian, Black, Transvestite, and previously incarcerated individuals to develop Spicy Detective, later renamed Spicy City. South Korea-based studios Koko Enterprises and Seoul Moive animated the series while Funbag Animation Studios in Ottawa animated the virtual reality scenes from the first episode.

== Episodes ==
No.	Title	Directed by	Written by	Original release date
1	"Love Is a Download"	John Kafka	Preston Bakshi	July 11, 1997
A blonde woman named Alice, seeking escape from her abusive boyfriend Jake, finds true love in a virtual world in a Geisha avatar with the washed-up veteran now working as a "virtual investigator", Champ.
2	"Mano's Hands"	Ralph Bakshi	Lawrence Chua & Willie Perdomo	July 18, 1997
The tale of a bongo player named Mano's hands coming to life and terrorizing civilians after mob members chop them off.
3	"Tears of a Clone"	Ennio Torresan Jr.	Franz Henkel and Lou Walker	August 1, 1997
A detective and his guide Harry goes on a search to the underground to find the daughter of a rich old man named Flaxton, only to return with her clone instead.
4	"An Eye for an Eye"	Ennio Torresan Jr.	Douglas Brooks West	August 8, 1997
A female police officer named Margo plots to blackmail Spicy City's judge, and her partner, Ernie, must choose between staying out of it and stopping Margo's reign of terror once and for all.
5	"Sex Drive"	Ralph Bakshi	Preston Bakshi	August 15, 1997
A female police officer named Nisa who is being mistreated by her coworkers teams up with a cyborg prostitute named Virus whose business is struggling thanks to her male clients using virtual prostitutes when the virtual prostitutes begin sucking the intelligence out of their "Johnsons" while they have to fight a Japanese scientist named Otaku.
6	"Raven's Revenge"	John Kafka	Douglas Brooks West	August 22, 1997
Raven is hounded by robot police officers for being born with a DNA pattern that brands her as a freak.

== Reception ==
The series premiered on July 11, 1997 at midnight, beating South Park to television by over a month and becoming the first "adults-only" cartoon series.

Although critical reaction was mixed and largely unfavorable, Spicy City received acceptable ratings. The Los Angeles Times called the series "Adolescent Humor for Adults". The Dallas Morning News said the series "exploits the female form while also condemning the practice."

A second season was approved, but the network wanted to fire Bakshi's writing team and hire professional Los Angeles screenwriters. When Bakshi refused to cooperate with the network, the series was cancelled.
