= El Degüello =

Bugle call

"El Degüello" (Spanish: El toque a degüello or tocar a degüello) is a bugle or trumpet call traditionally used in Spanish and Latin American armies to signal that no quarter would be given, that is, that the enemy would be shown no mercy and that prisoners would not be taken. The name derives from the Spanish verb degollar (“to slit the throat” or “to behead”).

The call has Iberian origins and was later adopted by Spanish colonial forces in the Americas, by patriot armies during the Spanish American wars of independence, and by Mexican forces. It is best known in the United States for its association with the Mexican Army under Antonio López de Santa Anna during the 1836 Battle of the Alamo.

== Etymology ==
Degüello is a noun formed from the verb degollar, itself from Latin decollare (“to remove the head/neck”). In military usage the phrase tocar a degüello or toque a degüello functions as a cavalry signal ordering an attack without quarter. Related expressions include entrar a degüello (“to assault a place without giving quarter”) and the war cry ¡A degüello!.

== History ==
=== Origins and Spanish use ===
The call is traditionally described as having Andalusian or Moorish origins on the Iberian Peninsula, later adopted by Christian Spanish forces.It ordered troops to fight without mercy, cutting the throats of enemies who surrendered. In Spanish military practice it became a standard cavalry signal for a no-quarter assault.

=== Spanish American wars of independence ===
Spanish armies introduced the call to the Americas. It was subsequently adopted by patriot forces fighting for independence. Contemporary and later accounts record its use during the campaigns of Simón Bolívar, including at the battles of Junín and Ayacucho, where cavalry units sounded toque a degüello during charges.

=== Mexican use ===
In independent Mexico the call remained in use as a cavalry signal ordering an attack without quarter. It is most famous in Anglo-American memory for its reported use by the Mexican Army under General Antonio López de Santa Anna during the Battle of the Alamo on 6 March 1836.

According to secondary sources based on the research of Amelia Williams, Mexican army bands played the degüello on the morning of the final assault as the signal that no quarter would be given. Williams noted that the music existed in multiple variants; no surviving eyewitness musical notation from the 1836 assault itself is known. Later reconstructions and popular accounts often treat a particular melody as the “authentic” Alamo call, but the precise notes played on 6 March remain uncertain.

After the Alamo, documented combat use of the call by Mexican forces is scarce. The clearest later reference occurs during the Mexican–American War at the Battle of Temascalitos where Captain Antonio Ponce de León ordered the signal.

In mid-19th-century Mexican military practice the call continued to appear in cavalry signal lists as the ordinary order for a charge, not necessarily as an automatic directive of no quarter.

=== Cuban independence wars ===
During the Cuban wars of independence, Cuban forces, frequently short of ammunition, used machete charges against Spanish troops. These were accompanied by a clarion call known as toque a degüello.

The first such charge was ordered by Máximo Gómez on 26 October 1868 at the Battle of Pinos de Baire. With a small force armed mostly with machetes, Gómez ambushed a Spanish column and ordered the assault with the cry “¡Al machete!” The action is widely regarded as the introduction of the machete charge as a standard Cuban tactic; the accompanying toque a degüello thereafter became the signal for such charges.

One of the best-documented later instances occurred when Major General Ignacio Agramonte, commanding a small cavalry force, ordered the call before charging a larger Spanish column holding Brigadier Julio Sanguily. Contemporary and later Cuban accounts record Agramonte’s order as “¡Trompeta: toque usted degüello!”.

== Music ==
The historical call was a functional military signal rather than a concert piece. Multiple variants existed; Amelia Williams reproduced several movements of a version obtained from Mexican sources in her 1930s study. Modern recordings and film scores frequently use different melodies.

== In popular culture ==
=== Film and television ===
In film the music associated with “El Degüello” varies widely and is often not the historical bugle call. In John Wayne’s Rio Bravo (1959) and The Alamo (1960), the theme used is an original instrumental composition by Dimitri Tiomkin, not a transcription of the Mexican cavalry call. The 2004 film The Alamo uses a different arrangement treated as a military dirge. Earlier depictions as a bugle call appear in Davy Crockett, King of the Wild Frontier (1955), The Last Command (1955), Viva Max! (1969), and the television film The Alamo: Thirteen Days to Glory (1987).

The title “Degüello” was also used for an episode of the British series Endeavour (Series 6, Episode 4, 2019).

== See also ==
- No quarter
- Bugle call
- Battle of the Alamo
