= Edmond O'Brien =

American actor (1915–1985)

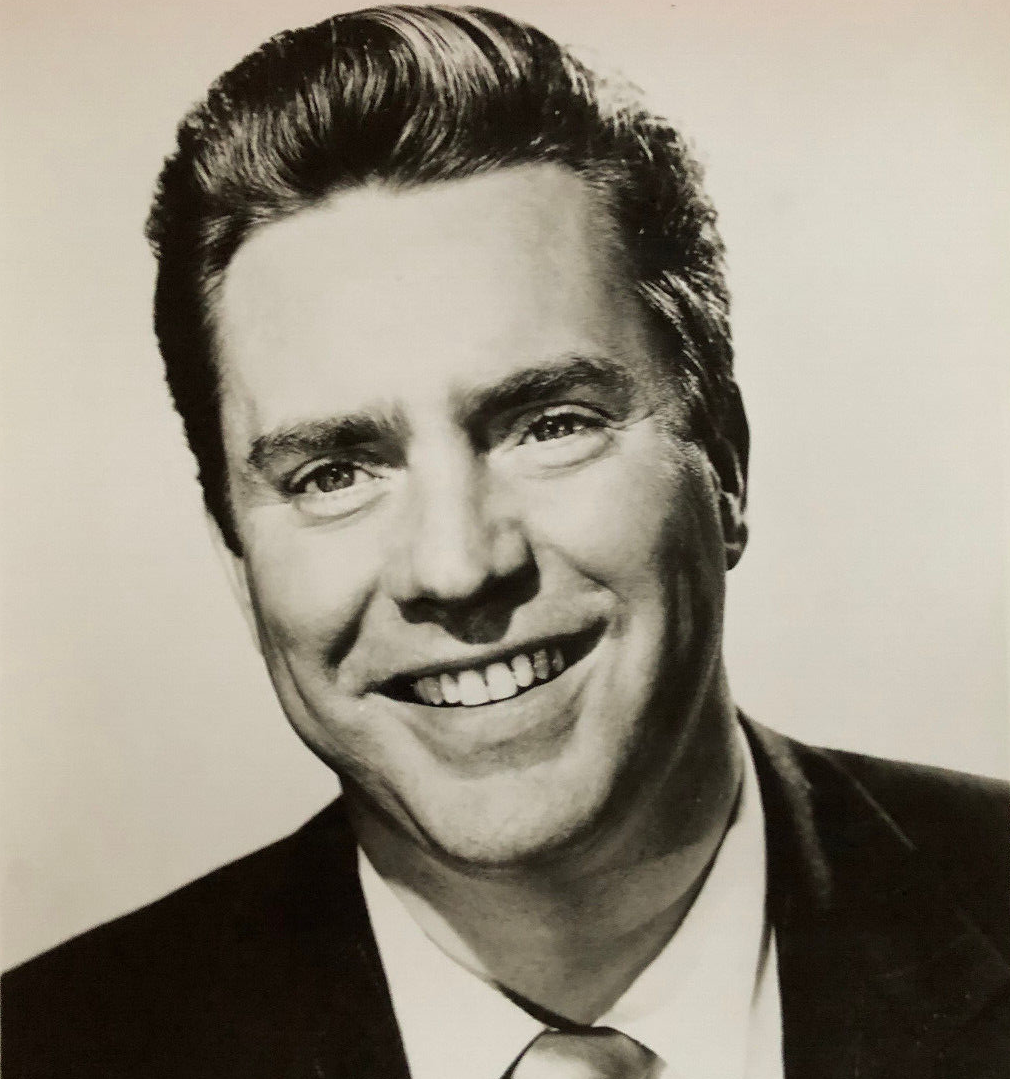
- O'Brien in 1955
- Born: Eamon Joseph O'Brien; September 10, 1915; Brooklyn, New York, U.S.
- Died: May 8, 1985 (aged 69); Inglewood, California, U.S.
- Occupations: Actor; film director
- Years active: 1936–1974
- Spouses: Nancy Kelly (m. 1941; div. 1942) Olga San Juan (m. 1948; div. 1976)
- Children: 3, including Maria and Brendan O'Brien
- Relatives: Liam O'Brien (brother)
- Awards: Hollywood Walk of Fame
- Website: edmondobrien.com

Eamon Joseph O'Brien (Irish: Éamonn Seosamh Ó Briain; September 10, 1915 – May 8, 1985), known professionally as Edmond O'Brien, was an American actor of stage, screen, and television, and film director. His career spanned almost 40 years, and he won an Academy Award, two Golden Globe Awards, two Photoplay Awards, and two stars on the Hollywood Walk of Fame.

O'Brien was both leading man and a character actor of American cinema, with his co-starring performances in The Barefoot Contessa (1954) and Seven Days in May (1964) each earning him the nomination for an Academy Award for Best Supporting Actor; he won for his role in The Barefoot Contessa. His other notable films include The Hunchback of Notre Dame (1939), The Killers (1946), A Double Life (1947), White Heat (1949), D.O.A. (1950), The Hitch-Hiker (1953), Julius Caesar (1953), 1984 (1956), The Girl Can't Help It (1956), The Man Who Shot Liberty Valance (1962), Fantastic Voyage (1966), The Wild Bunch (1969), and The Other Side of the Wind (2018).

== Early years ==
O'Brien was born in Brooklyn, New York, the seventh and youngest child of Agnes (née Baldwin) and James O'Brien. His parents were natives of Tallow, County Waterford, Ireland. His father died when he was four years old.

O'Brien performed magic shows for children in his neighborhood, spelling his last name backwards and billing himself as "Neirbo the Great". An aunt who taught high school English and speech took him to the theatre from an early age and he developed an interest in acting. He began acting in plays at school.

After attending Fordham University for six months, O'Brien went to Neighborhood Playhouse School of the Theatre on a scholarship. O'Brien studied for two years under such teachers as Sanford Meisner; his classmates included Betty Garrett. "It was simply the best training in the world for a young actor, singer or dancer," O'Brien said, adding that "(w)hat these teachers encouraged above all was getting your tools ready – your body, your voice, your speech."

O'Brien took classes with the Columbia Laboratory Players group, which emphasized training in Shakespeare.

== Career ==
=== Theatre ===
O'Brien began working in summer stock in Yonkers. He made his first Broadway appearance at age 21 in Daughters of Atreus.

He played a grave digger in Hamlet, toured in Parnell, and then appeared in Maxwell Anderson's The Star-Wagon with stars Lillian Gish and Burgess Meredith. In 1940, O'Brien performed with Ruth Chatterton in John Van Druten's Leave Her to Heaven on Broadway. Twelve years later, O'Brien appeared in Van Druten's I've Got Sixpence.

=== Film ===
O'Brien's theatre work attracted the attention of Pandro Berman at RKO. Berman offered O'Brien the role of a romantic lead in The Hunchback of Notre Dame (1939).

O'Brien returned to Broadway to play Mercutio opposite Laurence Olivier and Vivien Leigh in Romeo and Juliet.

RKO offered O'Brien a long-term contract. Harold Lloyd was then producing comedies for RKO, and co-starred O'Brien with Lucille Ball and George Murphy in A Girl, a Guy, and a Gob (1941). O'Brien co-starred with Nancy Kelly, whom O'Brien would later marry, in Parachute Battalion (1941).

O'Brien went back to the Harold Lloyd unit, which continued to function after the producer's departure, and displayed a breezy sense of humor in the farce comedy Obliging Young Lady (1942), a vehicle for the young Broadway star Joan Carroll. In May 1942, Universal bought out O'Brien's RKO contract so he could star opposite Deanna Durbin in The Amazing Mrs. Holliday (1943). After that, O'Brien joined the armed services.

=== World War II ===
During World War II, O'Brien served in the U.S. Army Air Forces and appeared in the Air Forces' Broadway play Winged Victory. He was joined in the Moss Hart production by Red Buttons, Karl Malden, Kevin McCarthy, Gary Merrill, Barry Nelson, and Martin Ritt. The play was filmed in 1944 with O'Brien reprising his stage performance and Judy Holliday co-starring. O'Brien toured for two years in the stage production, appearing alongside a young Mario Lanza.

=== Universal ===
O'Brien returned to the screen at Universal, playing insurance investigator Jim Reardon in film noir The Killers in 1946. He followed that with the lead in The Web, and the second lead in A Double Life, both 1947 noirs.

He had a second lead in the screen version of Lillian Hellman's drama Another Part of the Forest. He then starred in the romantic comedy For the Love of Mary (again with Deanna Durbin), the World War II-set Fighter Squadron, and the noir An Act of Murder (all 1948).

=== Warner Bros. ===
In late 1948, O'Brien signed a long-term contract with Warner Bros., which cast him as the undercover police officer in White Heat (1949) opposite James Cagney. "He [Cagney] said he had only one rule", O'Brien noted. "He would tap his heart and he would say, 'Play it from here, kid.' He always did and I believe it's the best rule for any performer. He could play a scene 90 ways and never repeat himself. He did this to keep himself fresh. I try to do this whenever possible."

In 1949, 3,147 members of the Young Women's League of America, a national charitable organisation devoted to single living, voted that O'Brien had more "male magnetism" than any other man in America. "All women adore ruggedness," league president Shirley Connolly said. "Edmund O'Brien's magnetic appearance and personality most fully stir women's imaginative impulses. We're all agreed that he has more male magnetism than any of the 60,000,000 men in the United States today." (Runners-up were Ezio Pinza, William O'Dwyer and Doak Walker.)

=== Broadcasting ===
O'Brien's contract with Warner Bros. ended following his appearance as the second lead in Backfire (shot in 1948 but not released until 1950). In the meantime, he signed on with CBS Radio for the radio drama Yours Truly, Johnny Dollar, playing the title role of a two-fisted insurance investigator. He remained with the role for exactly 31 months, starring in 103 half-hour episodes from February 3, 1950 to October 3, 1952. His other work in radio included Philip Morris Playhouse on Broadway.

=== Freelance ===
O'Brien returned to film noir, where he was a frequent player, and made one of his most famous movies, D.O.A., where he portrays a man investigating his own murder. He followed this with the lead in the noir 711 Ocean Drive (1950). Next was a starring role in the comedy The Admiral Was a Lady, co-starring roles in the noir Between Midnight and Dawn (1950) and the Western The Redhead and the Cowboy (1951), then the leads in the crime film Two of a Kind and the Westerns Warpath and Silver City, all in 1951. These were followed by the lead in the Western Denver and Rio Grande, and second lead in the noir The Turning Point.

However, even though O'Brien still managed to command leading-man roles, the prestige of his pictures and casts had begun to diminish and his career hit a slump. According to TCM, "In the early '50s, O'Brien started struggling with his weight, which could change significantly between films. He had no problems if that relegated him to character roles, but for a few years, "it was hard to come by anything really first rate."

"The funny thing about Hollywood is that they are interested in having you do one thing and do it well and do it ever after," said O'Brien. "That's the sad thing about being a leading man – while the rewards may be great in fame and finances, it becomes monotonous for an actor. I think that's why some of the people who are continually playing themselves are not happy."

He still made some notable movies, including the lead in two for Ida Lupino, The Hitch-Hiker and The Bigamist, and as a featured player as Casca in Joseph L. Mankiewicz's ensemble film of Julius Caesar (1953). And the leads again in, China Venture (1953), Shield for Murder (1954), and The Shanghai Story (1954).

O'Brien also worked heavily in television at this time, on such shows as Pulitzer Prize Playhouse, Lux Video Theatre and Schlitz Playhouse of Stars. He announced plans to direct his own films.

In 1951, he was in a well-publicized brawl with Serge Rubinstein at a cafe.

In spite of the ups and downs of his Hollywood career, O'Brien was still capable of greatness, both on the stage and on film. In 1954, Mankiewicz cast O'Brien as press agent Oscar Muldoon in The Barefoot Contessa, earning him an Academy Award for Best Supporting Actor.

O'Brien followed this with a number of important roles, including the second lead in the musical crime film Pete Kelly's Blues, the lead in the dystopian political movie 1984 and the noir A Cry in the Night (1956), co-lead in the World War II drama D-Day the Sixth of June (all 1956).

That same year, he had a refreshing change of pace as the comedy lead (a Runyonesque gangster who stumbles into rock-and-roll) in The Girl Can't Help It, alongside Tom Ewell and Jayne Mansfield.

In 1957, O'Brien earned the second lead in the Western The Big Land, film noir Stopover Tokyo, and the second lead in the musical drama Sing, Boy, Sing and lead in the drama The World Was His Jury in 1958. In 1959, he co-starred in the World War II drama Up Periscope and the French-Australian melodrama The Restless and the Damned.

=== Television ===
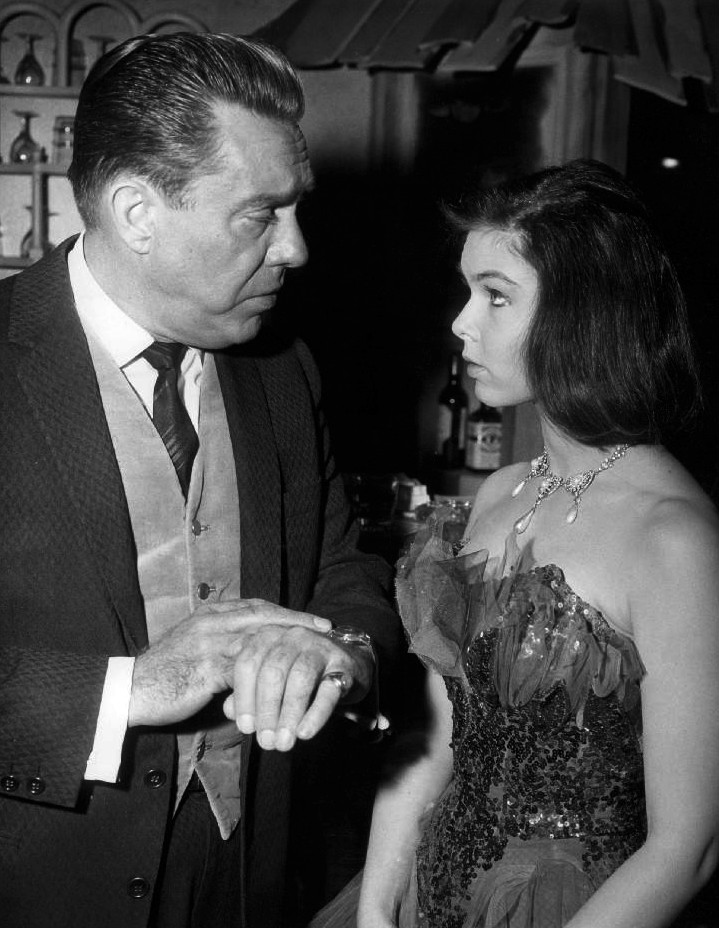
Edmond O'Brien and Yvonne Craig on Sam Benedict in 1963

O'Brien appeared extensively in television, including the 1957 live 90-minute broadcast on Playhouse 90 of The Comedian, a drama written by Rod Serling and directed by John Frankenheimer in which Mickey Rooney portrayed dictatorial television comedian Sammy Hogarth. O'Brien played Al Preston, the show's headwriter driven to the brink of insanity. Burned out dealing with the volatle Hogarth, unable to come up with new material for the show's comedy sketches, Preston deliberately plagiarizes material authored by a young comedy writer who died in combat during World War II. When the ruse is discovered, Preston is fired, but tells Hogarth his rages are rooted in his inability to find love.

In 1958, he directed and starred in a TV drama written by his brother, "The Town That Slept With the Lights On", about two Lancaster murders that so frightened the community that residents began sleeping with their lights on.

From 1959 to 1960, O'Brien portrayed the title role in the syndicated crime drama Johnny Midnight, about a New York City actor-turned-private detective. The producers refused to cast him unless he shed at least 50 pounds, so he went on a crash vegetarian diet and quit drinking.

"I seldom get very far away from crime," he recalled. "I've found it pays … I tried non-crime films like Another Part of the Forest … good picture, good cast, but no good at the box office … But you just put a gun in your hands and run through the streets doing cops and robbers and you're all set."

O'Brien also had his own production company, O'Brien-Frazen.

He made a French film, The Restless and the Damned for a fee more than $200,000. He was cast on the strength of his performance in The Girl Can't Help It and his Oscar.

O'Brien had roles on many television series, including an appearance on Target: The Corruptors!, The Eleventh Hour, Breaking Point and Mission: Impossible.

=== 1960s film work ===
O'Brien walked off the set of The Last Voyage in protest at safety issues during the shoot. He later came back and found out that his co-starring role had been trimmed. He was cast as American reporter Jackson Bentley in Lawrence of Arabia (1962), but had a heart attack during filming and was replaced in the co-starring role by Arthur Kennedy.

O'Brien recovered to direct his first feature Man-Trap (1961), a neo-noir starring Jeffrey Hunter and Stella Stevens, co-starred in the Disney comedy Moon Pilot (1962), and in the star-studded ensemble cast of the World War II epic The Longest Day (1962).

He continued to receive good roles, co-starring in The Man Who Shot Liberty Valance (1962) and as the author of the Robert Stroud biography the Birdman of Alcatraz (1962) was based upon.

"I've never made any kind of personality success," he admitted in a 1963 interview. "People never say 'that's an Eddie O'Brien part.' They say, 'That's a part Eddie O'Brien can play.'"

"I'd like to be able to say something important," he added. "To say something to people about their relationship with each other. If it touches just one guy, helps illustrate some points of view about living, then you've accomplished something."

Though his star would soon begin to dim, and his name occasionally slip further down in the billing, O'Brien could still deliver in the right role. His sweaty performance as a heroic U.S. senator in the tense political drama Seven Days in May (1964) earned him a second Oscar nomination.

In the mid-'60s, O'Brien co-starred with Roger Mobley and Harvey Korman in the "Gallegher" episodes of NBC TV's Walt Disney's Wonderful World of Color. From 1963 to 1965, he co-starred in the NBC legal drama Sam Benedict.

O'Brien worked steadily in both film and television throughout the late 1960s and early 1970s, however his memory problems were beginning to take their toll. A heart attack forced him to drop out of The Glass Bottom Boat (1966). He had a memorable role as the decrepit but boisterous Freddie Sykes in Sam Peckinpah's groundbreaking revisionist western The Wild Bunch (1969).

=== Later career ===
"It would be awfully hard to do a series again," he said in a 1971 interview. "I wouldn't go for an hour show again. They don't have much of a chance against the movies."

He was a cast member of The Other Side of the Wind, Orson Welles' unfinished 1970s movie that finally was released in 2018.

In 1971, he was hospitalized with a "slight pulmonary condition."

His last works, both in 1974, were an episode of the television series Police Story and main role in the film 99 and 44/100% Dead.

=== Recording ===
In 1957, O'Brien recorded a spoken-word album of The Red Badge of Courage (Caedmon TC 1040). Billboard said, "Edmond O'Brien brings intensity in the narrative portions and successfully impersonates the varied characters in dialog."

== Personal life ==
O'Brien was first married to actress Nancy Kelly from 1941 until 1942. He married his second wife, actress Olga San Juan in 1948. San Juan was the mother of his three children, television producer Bridget O'Brien and actors Maria O'Brien (1950–2026) and Brendan O'Brien (1962–2023). The marriage ended in divorce in 1976.

In the late 1970s, O'Brien fell ill with Alzheimer's disease. In a 1983 interview, his daughter Maria remembers seeing her father in a straitjacket at a Veterans' Hospital: "He was screaming. He was violent. I remember noticing how thin he'd gotten. We didn't know, because for years he'd been sleeping with all his clothes on. We saw him a little later and he was walking around like all the other lost souls there."

== Death ==
Edmond O'Brien died on May 9, 1985, at St. Erne's Sanitorium in Inglewood, California, of complications from Alzheimer's disease at age 69.

== Walk of Fame ==
For his contribution to the motion picture industry, Edmond O'Brien has a star on the Hollywood Walk of Fame at 1725 Vine Street, and a second star at 6523 Hollywood Boulevard for his contribution to the television industry. Both were dedicated on February 8, 1960.

== Biography ==
Sculthorpe, Derek (March 4, 2018). Edmond O'Brien: Everyman of Film Noir. McFarland & Co. ISBN 978-1-4766-7443-8.

== Complete filmography ==
Year	Title	Role	Notes
1939	The Hunchback of Notre Dame	Gringoire	
1941	A Girl, a Guy, and a Gob	Stephen Herrick	
1941	Parachute Battalion	William "Bill" Mayberry Burke	
1942	Obliging Young Lady	"Red" Reddy, aka Professor Stanley	
1942	Powder Town	J. Quincy "Penji" Pennant	
1943	The Amazing Mrs. Holliday	Tom Holliday	
1944	Winged Victory	Irving Miller	Credited as Sgt. Edmond O'Brien
1946	The Killers	Jim Riordan	
1947	The Web	Bob Regan	
1947	A Double Life	Bill Friend	
1948	Another Part of the Forest	Benjamin "Ben" Hubbard	
1948	For the Love of Mary	Lt. Tom Farrington	
1948	Fighter Squadron	Major Ed Hardin	
1948	An Act of Murder	David Douglas	
1949	Task Force	Radio Announcing Pearl Harbor Attack	Voice, uncredited
1949	White Heat	Hank Fallon; Vic Pardo	
1949	Under Capricorn	Narrator	Voice, uncredited
1949	D.O.A.	Frank Bigelow	
1950	Backfire	Steve Connelly	Filmed in 1948
1950	711 Ocean Drive	Mal Granger	
1950	The Admiral Was a Lady	Jimmy Stevens	
1950	Between Midnight and Dawn	Officer Dan Purvis	
1951	The Redhead and the Cowboy	Maj. Dunn Jeffers	
1951	Two of a Kind	Michael "Lefty" Farrell	
1951	Warpath	John Vickers	
1951	Silver City	Larkin Moffatt	
1952	The Greatest Show on Earth	Midway Barker at End	Uncredited
1952	Denver and Rio Grande	Jim Vesser	
1952	The Turning Point	John Conroy	
1953	The Hitch-Hiker	Roy Collins	
1953	Man in the Dark	Steve Rawley	
1953	Cow Country	Ben Anthony	
1953	Julius Caesar	Casca	
1953	China Venture	Capt. Matt Reardon	
1953	The Bigamist	Harry Graham; Harrison Graham	
1954	Shield for Murder	Detective Lt. Barney Nolan	Also co-directed
1954	The Shanghai Story	Dr. Dan Maynard	
1954	The Barefoot Contessa	Oscar Muldoon	Academy Award for Best Supporting Actor; Golden Globe Award for Best Supporting Actor – Motion Picture; New York Film Critics Circle Award for Best Actor (3rd Place)
1955	Pete Kelly's Blues	Fran McCarg	
1956	1984	Winston Smith of the Outer Party	
1956	D-Day the Sixth of June	Lt. Col. Alexander Timmer	
1956	A Cry in the Night	Capt. Dan Taggart	
1956	The Rack	Lt. Col. Frank Wasnick	
1956	The Girl Can't Help It	Marty "Fats" Murdock	
1957	The Big Land	Joe Jagger	
1957	Stopover Tokyo	George Underwood	
1958	The World Was His Jury	David Carson	
1958	Sing, Boy, Sing	Joseph Sharkey	
1959	Up Periscope	Commander Paul Stevenson	
1959	The Restless and the Damned	Mike Buchanan	aka L'Ambitieuse
1960	The Last Voyage	Second Engineer Walsh	
1960	The 3rd Voice	The Voice	Voice
1961	The Great Impostor	Capt. Glover – HMCS Cayuga	
1961	Man-Trap	Voice of Photographer	Uncredited, O'Brien is the director of this film
1962	Moon Pilot	McClosky ("Mac")	
1962	The Man Who Shot Liberty Valance	Dutton Peabody	Western Heritage Award for Best Theatrical Motion Picture
1962	Birdman of Alcatraz	Tom Gaddis	
1962	The Longest Day	Maj. Gen. Raymond D. Barton	
1964	Seven Days in May	Sen. Raymond Clark	Golden Globe Award for Best Supporting Actor – Motion Picture; Nominated—Academy Award for Best Supporting Actor
1964	Rio Conchos	Col. Theron Pardee	
1964	The Hanged Man	Arnie Seeger	
1965	Sylvia	Oscar Stewart	
1965	Synanon	Chuck Dederich	
1966	Fantastic Voyage	General Alan Carter	
1966	The Doomsday Flight	The Man	TV movie
1967	The Viscount	Ricco Barone	
1967	To Commit a Murder	Sphax (publisher)	
1967	The Outsider	Marvin Bishop	TV movie
1968	Flesh and Blood	Harry	TV movie
1969	The Wild Bunch	Freddie Sykes	
1969	The Love God?	Osborn Tremaine	
1970	The Intruders	Col. William Bodeen	TV movie filmed in 1967
1970	Dream No Evil	Timothy MacDonald	
1971	River of Mystery	R.J. Twitchell	TV movie
1971	What's a Nice Girl Like You...?	Morton Stillman	TV movie
1972	Jigsaw	Det. Ed Burtelson	TV movie
1972	They Only Kill Their Masters	George	
1973	Isn't It Shocking?	Justin Oates	TV movie
1973	Lucky Luciano	Commissioner Harry J. Anslinger	Credited as Edmund O'Brien
1974	99 and 44/100% Dead	Uncle Frank Kelly	
1974	Juicio de Socrates	Socrates	Short
2018	The Other Side of the Wind	Pat	Filmed in the 1970s

== Partial television credits ==
Year	Series	Role	Episode(s)
1951	Pulitzer Prize Playhouse	Ben Jordan	"Icebound"
1953–1958	Schlitz Playhouse of the Stars	Captain Simpson Rick Saunders Jim Reardon	"The Long Shot" (1953) "Lineman's Luck" (1953) "The Net Draws Tight" (1954) "Tower Room 14-A (1957)" "The Town That Slept with the Lights On" (1957)
1954	The Ford Television Theatre	Captain Joyce	"Charlie C Company"
1954–1956	Climax!	Joel Flint; Leo Waldek	"An Error in Chemistry" (1954) "Figures in Clay" (1956)
1955	Stage 7	Clinton Sturgess	"Debt in Honor"
1955	The Red Skelton Show	Grizzled Old Prospector	Episode #4.23
1955	Damon Runyon Theater	Duke Martin	"Old Em's Kentucky Home"
1955	Playwrights '56	Sidney	"The Heart's a Forgotten Hotel"
1955	The Star and the Story	Ray Ericson	"Dark Stranger"
1956	Screen Directors Playhouse	Thaddeus Kubaczik	"A Ticket for Thaddeus"
1957–1959	Playhouse 90	Al Preston; Joe Ferguson; Roy Brenner	"The Comedian" (1957) "The Male Animal" (1958) "The Blue Men" (1959)
1957–1959	Zane Grey Theatre	Russ Andrews; Marshal Ben Clark	"A Gun Is for Killing" (1957) "Lonesome Road" (1959)
1958	Suspicion (TV series)	Sgt. Miles Odeen	"Death Watch"
1958	Lux Playhouse	Big Jim Webber	"Coney Island Winter"
1959	Laramie	Captain Sam Prado	"The Iron Captain"
1960	Johnny Midnight	Johnny Midnight	39 episodes
1961	The Dick Powell Show	Sid Williams	"Killer in the House"
1961	Target: The Corruptors!	Ollie Crown	"The Invisible Government"
1962–1963	Sam Benedict	Sam Benedict	28 episodes
1964	The Greatest Show on Earth	Mike O'Kelley	"Clancy"
1964	Breaking Point	Roger Conning	"The Tides of Darkness"
1964	The Eleventh Hour	Buck Denholt	"The Color of Sunset"
1965	Walt Disney's Wonderful World of Color	Jefferson Crowley	6 episodes
1965	The Long, Hot Summer	Will "Boss" Varner	13 episodes
1967	The Virginian	Thomas Manstead	"Ah Sing vs. Wyoming"
1968	Mission: Impossible	Raymond Halder	The Counterfeiter
1969	The Bold Ones: The Protectors	Warden Millbank	"If I Should Wake Before I Die"
1970	Insight	Houseworthy – Tycoon	"The 7 Minute Life of James Houseworthy"
1970	The Young Lawyers	MacGillicuddy	"MacGillicuddy Always Was a Pain in the Neck"
1971	The Name of the Game	Bergman	"LA 2017"
1971	The High Chaparral	Morgan MacQuarie	"The Hostage"
1972	Cade's County	Clint Pritchard	"The Brothers"
1972	The Streets of San Francisco	Officer Gustav "Gus" Charnovski, SFPD	"The Thirty-Year Pin"
1972	McMillan & Wife	Mr. Fontaine	"Cop of the Year"
1973	The New Temperatures Rising Show	Dr. Banning	"Super Doc"
1974	Police Story	Chief Frank Modeer	"Chain of Command"

== Theatre ==
- Hamlet (Oct 1936)
- Daughters of Atreus (Oct 1936)
- The Star Wagon (Sept 1937 – April 1938)
- Julius Caesar (May 1938)
- King Henry IV Part I (Jan–April 1939)
- Leave Her to Heaven (Feb–March 1940)
- Romeo and Juliet (May–June 1940)
- Winged Victory (Nov 1943 – May 1944)
- I've Got Sixpence (Dec 1952)
