= San Diego County Fair =

County fair in Del Mar, California, U.S.

Coordinates: 32.975°N 117.260°W

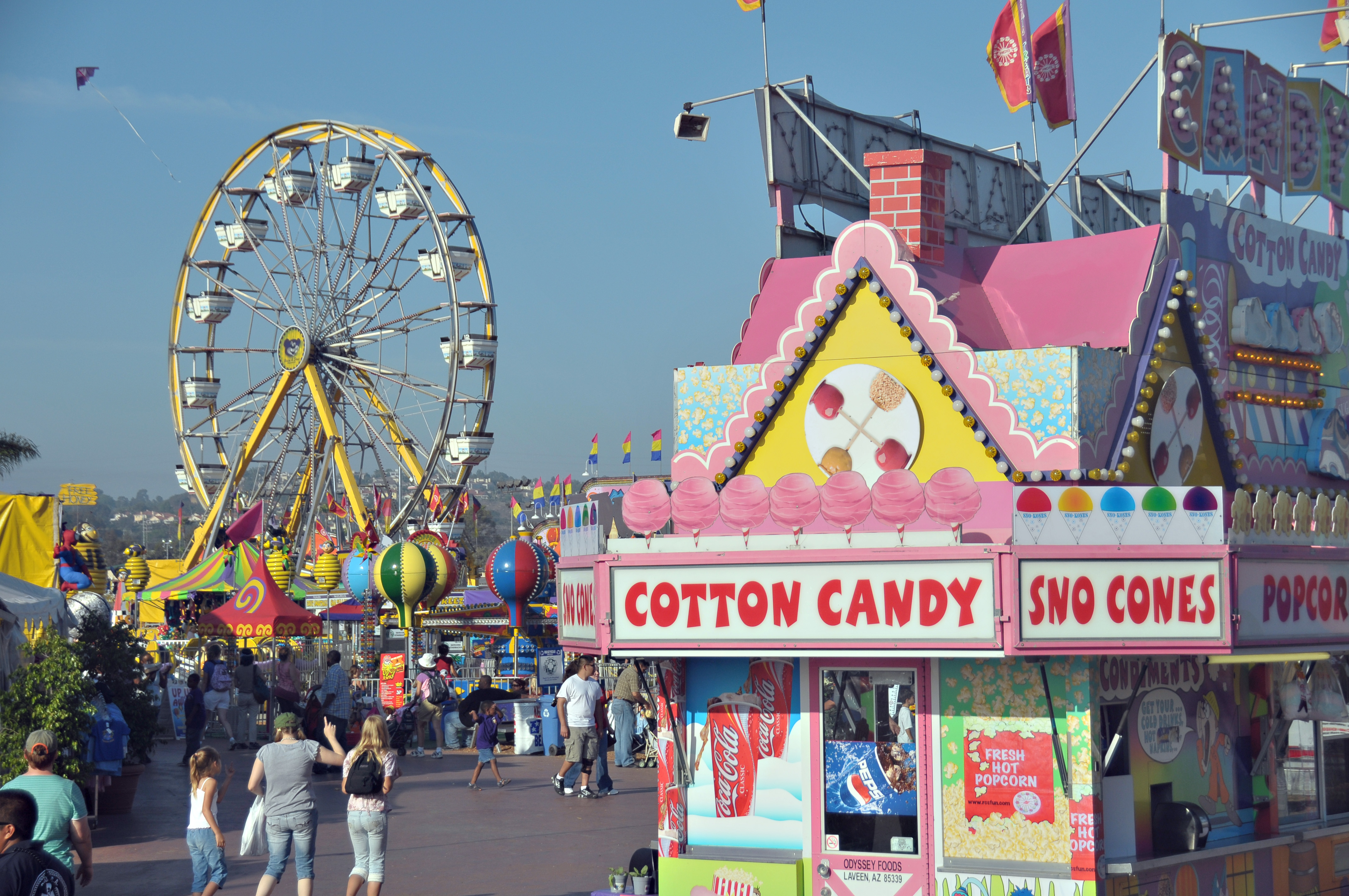
San Diego County Fair, Del Mar, 2009

The San Diego County Fair is an annual fair held in Del Mar, California. It is held every summer at the Del Mar Fairgrounds. Established in 1880, the fair is the longest running event in San Diego County.

== History ==
The San Diego County Fair began in 1880 as an agricultural fair. The location moved from place to place for several years, finally settling on the Del Mar Fairgrounds when it opened in 1936. There was no fair in 1917–18 due to World War I, 1942–45 due to World War II, and 2020 in response to the COVID-19 pandemic and two stay-at-home orders issued by California Governor Gavin Newsom.

The fair has been known by various names during its history: The San Diego County Fair from 1880 to 1953 and from 2002 to present; the Southern California Exposition and San Diego County Fair from 1954 to 1969; the Southern California Exposition from 1970 to 1982; and the Del Mar Fair from 1983 through 2001.

After visiting farm animals at the fair in 2019, a 2-year-old boy died and three others were sickened but not hospitalized; they had contracted pathogenic E. coli, and the child had developed a kidney infection.

In 2020 and 2021, the Fair was canceled due to the COVID-19 pandemic. With a lack of reserves to fall back on, the 22nd District Agricultural Association, which produces the Fair, was forced to lay off more than 60% of the staff.

The 22nd DAA hosted a scaled-down event in 2021 called "Home Grown Fun." The Fair returned in 2022.

== Fairest of the Fair ==
From 1936 through 2003 the fair included a beauty pageant. The winner was originally called Queen of the Fair; in 1947 the title was changed to Fairest of the Fair. The winner and her "court of lovelies" were featured at the fair and in public appearances throughout the year. In 2004 the pageant was discontinued due to high costs and legal wrangling over a disqualified entry in 2003 involving Raquel Rusing. Most Memorable Contestant was 1979 Marlene Rosas of El Cajon, and the best known winner of the Fairest of the Fair pageant was the late 1958 winner, a La Jolla High School student named Raquel Tejada, better known as actress Raquel Welch (1940-2023).

== Don Diego ==
For decades the official greeter and host of the fair was Don Diego, a smiling caballero portrayed by Spanish actor Tom Hernández from 1947 until his death in 1984. The character was based on a real person, Don Diego Alvarado, whose family had a large land grant in the Del Mar area during the late 1800s; Alvarado was known for his grand parties and was regarded as the local symbol of a gracious host. Dressed in a huge sombrero, embroidered tunic and trousers, and boots, and toting a guitar, Hernandez promoted the fair as its goodwill ambassador. He escorted the Fairest of the Fair and other celebrities, and personally greeted ordinary fairgoers with a "¡Bienvenidos Amigos!" ("Welcome, Friends)".

After Hernandez' death the fair board decided to retire the character rather than try to replace Hernandez, who they felt had been uniquely qualified for the role of Don Diego. A 16-foot bronze statue of Hernandez as Don Diego, created by artist Maher Morcos, now stands at the fair's main entrance. The fair established a scholarship fund in 1986, the Don Diego fund, in his honor. Each year the statue is dressed in garb that is appropriate to the theme of that year's fair.

== Features ==
The fair features many musical and talent performances from artists of varying genres, from nationally known acts on the infield stage to local professionals to amateur groups. There are dozens of contests ranging from agricultural efforts to cooking to flower arranging.

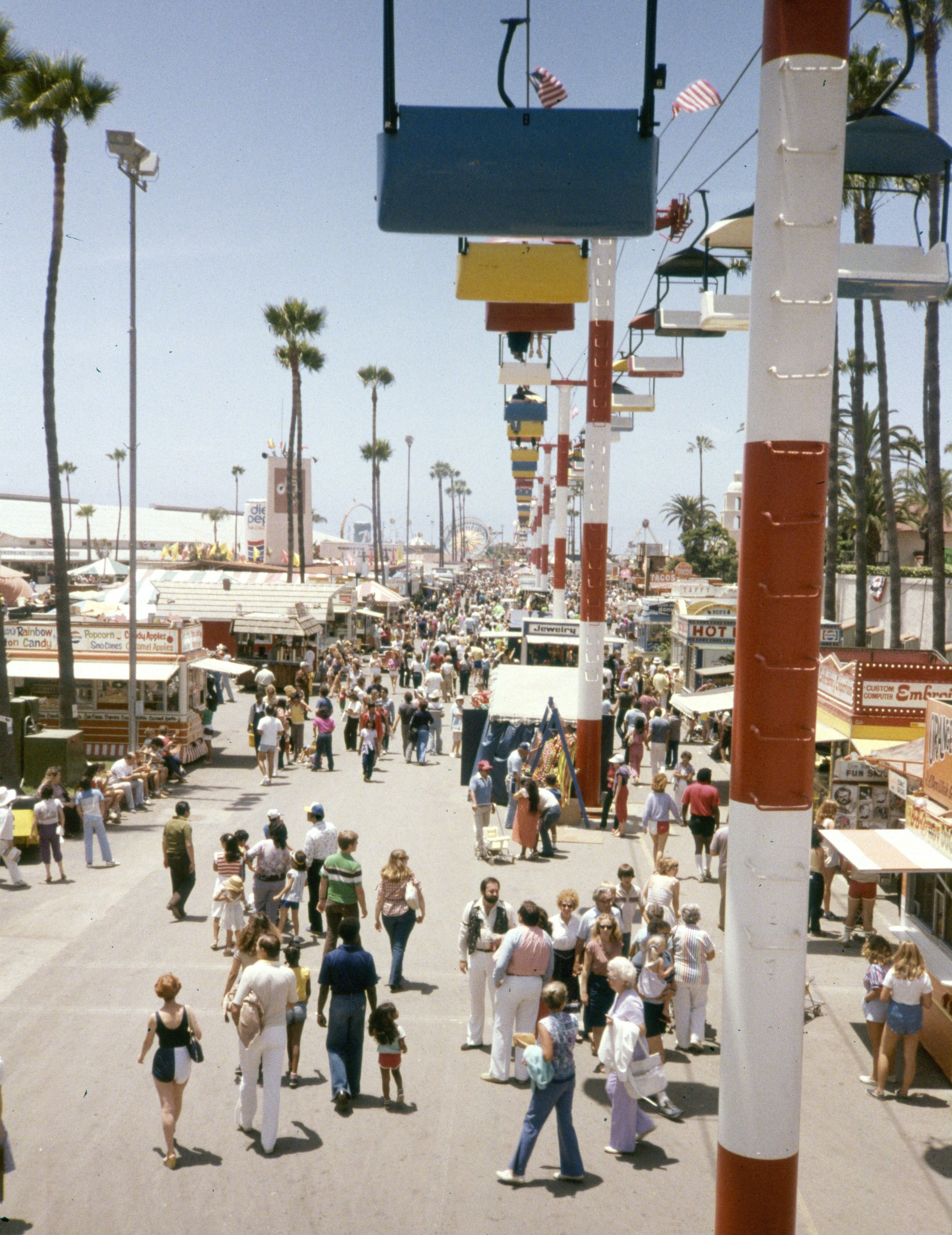
View of the midway, 1982

As with many county fairs, animal exhibits are abundant. There are also two buildings full of commercial exhibits. There are exhibits featuring San Diego County's heritage, as well as exhibits specially designed for the fair's theme, which changes annually, making the fair somewhat different each year. Most recently, the theme for 2023 was "Get Out There!".

Children and students are honored in the Kids' Best and Student Showcase displays, which feature artwork created by students ranging from kindergarten through community college. School yearbooks are displayed as well as woodworking, photography, and art projects constructed by high school students. All ages can display their talents in exhibits such as Design in Wood, photo and art shows, and Home and Hobby. Each day features a particular city or town in San Diego County.

Food also is a feature of the fair, with more than 100 food booths. There are many fair classics as well as other interesting or outrageous creations such as beef sundaes, fried Twinkies, and apple fries. Something new is added every year, such as fried cola in 2007, chocolate bacon in 2009, and fried butter in 2010. The 2019 fair saw the debut of the Buffalo Chicken Chimichanga and the Tres Leches Cinnamon Roll was introduced in 2025.

The Fourth of July brings events celebrating the United States' independence, including a parade and a large fireworks display in the evening.

With an average daily attendance of more than 60,000 in 2014, it is the fourth largest fair in North America, and California's largest ever, surpassed in attendance only by the State Fair of Texas, Houston Livestock Show and Rodeo, and the Minnesota State Fair. The 2025 fair saw an average attendance of 44,000 people, on par with 2024, marking a decrease in attendance over the decade.

== Date and location ==
The fair is generally held from the last weekend in May (early June otherwise) through the Fourth of July weekend, and is closed Mondays/Tuesdays in June.

The fair is held at the Del Mar Fairgrounds in Del Mar, California, off the Via De La Valle exit (Exit 36) on the Interstate 5 Freeway. The address is 2260 Jimmy Durante Blvd., Del Mar, CA 92014.

Pacific Surfliner and Coaster stop at the nearby Solana Beach station on regular schedules, and they usually increase service during the events of the fair (NCTD uses their "Fair Tripper" ticket packages for discounts and Amtrak increases capacity). There are plans in the future to build a special events platform on the west side of the Del Mar Fairgrounds to provide easier access to events held there, such as the fair.

== Parking ==
The Del Mar Fairgrounds charges for parking in their main lots during the San Diego County Fair.

There are multiple free and reduced fee options for parking during the fair that includes free shuttle service to help combat traffic and parking problems.

- Torrey Pines High School, 3710 Del Mar Heights Rd., Del Mar
- The Solana Beach COASTER and Amtrak Station - Solana Beach
- Del Mar Horsepark, 14550 El Camino Real, Del Mar

== Themes ==
Since 1998 the San Diego County Fair has adopted an annual theme that highlights different topics, community programs, animals and agriculture, and pop culture elements.

- 1989 - Get Crackin' It's All for You
- 1990 - It's Hoppening!
- 1991 - Better Get Moooovin'
- 1992 - Horsing Around, a 24-Carrot Love A-Fair
- 1993 - Wheels and Squeals
- 1994 - Fun for Ewe
- 1995 - Flowers, Feathers and Old Fashioned Fun
- 1996 - Far Out, Furry & Family Fun
- 1997 - California Dreamin'
- 1998 - Discover California
- 1999 - The Rush is On (California Sesquicentennial)
- 2000 - California Dreamin'
- 2001 - Endless Summer - Endless Fun (Surfing)
- 2002 - Elvis Presley
- 2003 - Commotion by the Ocean
- 2004 - Seussentennial Celebration
- 2005 - Cinema Summer
- 2006 - Ride the Tide to Fun
- 2007 - Salute to Heroes
- 2008 - Summer of Sports
- 2009 - Music Mania
- 2010 - Taste the Fun
- 2011 - Race to The Fair
- 2012 - Out of This World
- 2013 - Game On!
- 2014 - The FAB Fair
- 2015 - A Fair to Remember
- 2016 - Mad About the Fair
- 2017 - Where the West is Fun
- 2018 - How Sweet it is
- 2019 - OzSome!
- 2020 - (No 2020 fair in response to the COVID-19 pandemic)
- 2021 - Home Grown Fun
- 2022 - Heroes ReUnite!
- 2023 - Get Out There!
- 2024 - Let's Go Retro
- 2025 - Summer Pet-Tacular
- 2026 - Once Upon a Fair

In 2003, Spanish versions of the theme were created to spearhead marketing campaigns for the Hispanic community in San Diego County plus Baja California:

- 2003 - Una Feria a Todo Mar
- 2004 - (No Spanish version adopted)
- 2005 - De Película
- 2006 - Va Llena de Diversión
- 2007 - Homenaje a los Héroes
- 2008 - Verano Deportivo
- 2009 - Explosión Musical
- 2010 - ¡Pruébala!
- 2011 - Arráncate a la Feria
- 2012 - La Feria de las Galaxias
- 2013 - ¡Juega!
- 2014 - Una Feria Fabulosa
- 2015 - La Feria del Recuerdo
- 2016 - Locos por la Feria
- 2017 - La Gran Feria del Oeste
- 2018 - La Más Dulce de las Ferias
- 2019 - ¡fabulOZa!
- 2020 - (No 2020 fair in response to the COVID-19 pandemic)
- 2021 - (No Spanish version adopted)
- 2022 - Héroes ¡Reúnanse!
- 2023 - ¡Explórala!
- 2024 - Vive lo Retro
- 2025 - De Patitas a La Feria del Condado de San Diego
- 2026 - Érase Una Vez
