= The 3rd Voice =

1960 film

- Theatrical release poster
- Directed by: Hubert Cornfield
- Written by: Hubert Cornfield
- Based on: All the Way by Charles Williams
- Produced by: Hubert Cornfield; Maury Dexter
- Starring: Edmond O'Brien; Julie London; Laraine Day
- Cinematography: Ernest Haller
- Edited by: John A. Bushelman
- Music by: Johnny Mandel
- Production company: Associated Producers Inc.
- Distributed by: 20th Century Fox
- Release date: March 5, 1960 (New York City)
- Running time: 79 minutes
- Country: United States
- Languages: English; Spanish

The 3rd Voice (also known as The Third Voice) is a 1960 American neo noir thriller crime drama film directed and written by Hubert Cornfield, who also produced the film with Maury Dexter. It is based on the novel All the Way by Charles Williams and stars Edmond O'Brien, Laraine Day (in her final film), and Julie London.

== Plot ==
The Man is the accomplice of Marian Forbes, the spurned mistress of a tycoon. She coaches The Man in impersonating the voice and appearance and habits of the intended victim. The Man begins his masquerade in a Mexican resort, where he meets Corey Scott and moves on to contemplating the murder of his tutor, but things begin to go awry.

== Cast ==
- Edmond O'Brien as The Man
- Laraine Day as Marian Forbes
- Julie London as Corey Scott
- Edward Colmans as Carreras
- Shirley O'Hara as Carreras' Secretary
- Ralph Brooks as Harris Chapman
- Abel Franco as Police Inspector
- George Eldredge as Judge Kendall
- Roque Ybarra as 1st Fisherman
- Ruben Moreno as 2nd Fisherman
- Raoul De Leon as Bank Official
- Francisco Ortega as Bank Cashier
- John Garrett as Bank Clerk
- Henry Delgado as Desk Clerk as Palacio
- Andre Oropeza as Desk Clerk as Miramar
- Sylvia Ray as Hotel Miramar Cashier
- Tom Hernández as Other Desk Clerk
- Olga San Juan as Blonde
- George Trevino as Captain Camos
- Lucille Curtis as Mrs. Kendall
- Tom Daly as Tourist at Bar
- Mario Armenta as Orchestra Leader
- Robert Hernandez as Bellhop
- Eddie Le Baron as Carlos
- Manuel Serrano as Headwaiter
- Francis Ravel as Waiter
- Alberto Monte as Photographer

== Production ==
The film was produced by Robert L. Lippert's Associated Producers Incorporated, which produced lower-budget films for 20th Century Fox. Lippert bought the rights to the book and arranged for Hubert Cornfield to adapt and direct. Lippert and Fox president Spyros Skouras increased the budget to a level that co-producer Maury Dexter described as a "nervous A class" of film. The film was shot in and around Los Angeles and Malibu in October 1959.

According to Dexter, Cornfield accused O'Brien of not knowing his lines, and O'Brien threatened to punch Cornfield on the final day of filming.

== Reception ==
Dexter later wrote that the film received positive reviews and "did fairly well at the box office".

In a contemporary review for the New York Times, critic A. H. Weiler called the film "... taut, complex and eerily fascinating for only about three-quarters of the way. A dénouement that seems telegraphed and contrived and some situations that are overly garrulous and static keep 'The Third Voice' from reaching a high pitch of excitement."

The Los Angeles Times called the film an "interesting thriller."
