= The Last Command (1955 film) =

1955 film by Frank Lloyd

- Original Australian film poster
- Directed by: Frank Lloyd
- Screenplay by: Warren Duff; Allen Rivkin
- Story by: Sy Bartlett
- Produced by: Frank Lloyd
- Starring: Sterling Hayden; Anna Maria Alberghetti; Richard Carlson; Arthur Hunnicutt; Ernest Borgnine; J. Carrol Naish
- Cinematography: Jack A. Marta
- Edited by: Tony Martinelli
- Music by: Max Steiner
- Color process: Trucolor
- Production company: Republic Pictures
- Distributed by: Republic Pictures
- Release date: August 3, 1955
- Running time: 110 minutes
- Country: United States
- Language: English
- Budget: $2,193,939

The Last Command is a 1955 American Western film directed by Frank Lloyd starring Sterling Hayden, Anna Maria Alberghetti, Richard Carlson, Arthur Hunnicutt, Ernest Borgnine and J. Carrol Naish based on the life of Jim Bowie and the Battle of the Alamo.

== Plot ==
In 1835, Jim Bowie discovers uneasy disputes between the Mexican government and the American immigrants who've settled in Texas. Dozens of American men, including Stephen F. Austin have been arrested for supposedly igniting rebellions against the Mexican governor Juan Almonte and the Mexican garrisons throughout Texas. Bowie attends a meeting of the Texian malcontents, listens to their arguments but urges calm and patience. Several of the Texians confront Bowie that he is not only a large landowner, but he is married to a daughter of a Mexican Lieutenant Governor. Bowie says these things are true. When faced with accusations he is disloyal to the American settlers, Bowie, who has only recently used his influence to free William Travis from arrest, leaves. After his departure, Mike "the Bull" Radin, a hot head Texian challenges Bowie to a knife fight. Bowie wins the fight and the respect of Mike.

On his return home Bowie is arrested by Mexican soldiers and brought to General Santa Anna. Unlike other films depicting the Texas War of Independence, Bowie and Santa Anna are friends and respect each other. Bowie relates the concerns of the Texians and notices Santa Anna has a Napoleon complex. He advises Santa Anna to free the arrested political prisoners and return Mexico to following the terms of the 1824 Constitution of Mexico. The two men agree to disagree but Santa Anna informs Bowie of the real reason his soldiers had brought him to him; Bowie's wife and children have died in a cholera epidemic.

Bowie becomes a heavy drinker and a drifter. He eventually sides with the Texians when he meets with Stephen Austin who tells him pacifism is no longer an option. After leading a band of mounted fighters in victory against Mexican dragoons at the Grass Fight, he and his men arrive in San Antonio de Bexar where he remains with his men. With tempers increasing between Travis and Bowie, both colonels in the Army of Texas. Mike suggests the garrison of the Alamo vote for their commander with Bowie winning and Travis becoming his second in command. The command expect reinforcements that never come. When Colonel Davy Crockett arrives, rather than the tales of his one thousand men, Crockett only has 29 fighters.

Santa Anna's army besieges the Alamo, and though allowing the women and children to leave in peace, Captain Dickinson's wife and Consuelo de Quesada, who loves Bowie refuse to go.

During the siege Santa Anna and Bowie meet one more time under a flag of truce with each man understanding the other's view that events have spiralled out of control. Bowie refuses to surrender the Alamo or to sit out the battle as Santa Anna's prisoner. Later Bowie is severely injured when seizing a Mexican cannon and bringing it back to the Alamo; his increasing ill health leads Bowie to grant full command to Travis. By now the two have come to respect each other.

Shortly thereafter, the Mexican army launches an overwhelming attack on the Alamo, and all the defenders including Travis, Crockett, and Bowie are killed.

== Cast ==
- Sterling Hayden as Jim Bowie
- Anna Maria Alberghetti as Consuelo de Quesada
- Richard Carlson as William Barret Travis
- Arthur Hunnicutt as Davy Crockett
- Ernest Borgnine as Mike Radin
- J. Carrol Naish as Gen. Antonio Lopez de Santa Anna
- Ben Cooper as Jeb Lacey
- John Russell as Capt. Almaron Dickinson
- Virginia Grey as Mrs. Dickinson
- Jim Davis as Ben Evans
- Eduard Franz as Lorenzo de Quesada
- Otto Kruger as Stephen F. Austin
- Russell Simpson as The Parson
- Roy Roberts as Dr. Summerfield
- Slim Pickens as Abe
- Hugh Sanders as Sam Houston
- Charles Stevens as Villager (uncredited)
- Ken Terrell as Defender (uncredited)

== Production ==
=== John Wayne ===
The project first emerged at Republic Films in 1948 as The Alamo, written by Patrick Ford, John Ford's son as a vehicle for the studio's biggest star, John Wayne. In 1950 it was announced Wayne would produce, direct and star in the film. The project was going to be filmed after Wayne did The Quiet Man for Republic; Paul Fix and James Edward Grant had reworked the script.

"I've always wanted to direct ever since I came into pictures", said Wayne, who had just begun producing with The Bullfighter and the Lady. He planned to make the film in Tucana, Mexico. Robert Clarke was announced for a key role.

However Republic Pictures head Herbert Yates and Wayne clashed. Wayne wanted to film the project in Mexico but Yates wanted to shoot it in Texas. Wayne was also unhappy that Yates wanted the actor to make the film for Republic, instead of making it for Wayne's company and distribute through Republic. It resulted in Wayne leaving Republic, an association that had existed since 1935, despite the fact that Wayne had a contract to make three more films for the studio.

"Yates will have to make me a darned good offer to make another picture with him. I'm fed up with him", said Wayne.

Five years later Wayne would play Davy Crockett in, as well as direct, the three-hour-plus Todd-AO production The Alamo, released by United Artists, that featured many elements of The Last Command but was also bloated and flawed with historical inaccuracies in its screenplay.

=== Shooting ===
Yates decided to rework the Alamo project with other actors. Republic were not making many films in 1954 but the Alamo project was key to the year. The movie was also known as The Unconquered Territory, The Texian, The Alamo and San Antonio Bexar. Frank Lloyd became attached to direct. It would be the last production for Lloyd as a director, as he retired soon after re-marrying in 1955; Lloyd died in 1960.

Filming started February 1955. William Witney shot the battle scenes near Fort Clark, Texas.

San Antonio's Sol Frank Uniform company made uniforms for the extras depicting the Mexican Army. For the foot soldiers 260 uniforms in sky blue, a color designed for the benefit of the Trucolor cameras, with red facings and 160 red uniforms with blue facings for the mounted soldiers.

== Soundtrack ==
Max Steiner's theme song for The Last Command, "Jim Bowie", is sung by musical star Gordon MacRae, who that year was starring in the smash hit film Oklahoma!, adapted from the famous Rodgers and Hammerstein musical. Steiner's score also re-imagines El Degüello, the Mexican song of no quarter as a bugle call.

== Reception ==
The Los Angeles Times called it "an exciting, vigorous attraction".
