= The Lion and the Horse =

1952 film

- Theatrical release poster
- Directed by: Louis King
- Written by: Crane Wilbur
- Produced by: Bryan Foy
- Starring: Steve Cochran; Ray Teal; Bob Steele
- Cinematography: Edwin B. DuPar
- Edited by: William H. Ziegler
- Music by: Max Steiner
- Color process: Warnercolor
- Production company: Warner Bros. Pictures
- Distributed by: Warner Bros. Pictures
- Release date: May 17, 1952
- Running time: 83 minutes
- Country: United States
- Language: English

The Lion and the Horse is a 1952 American Western film directed by Louis King, written by Crane Wilbur and starring Steve Cochran, Ray Teal and Bob Steele. It was produced and distributed by Warner Bros. Pictures.

== Cast ==
- Steve Cochran as Ben Kirby
- Ray Teal as Dave Tracy
- Bob Steele as Matt Jennings
- Harry Antrim as Cas Bagley
- George O'Hanlon as Shorty Cameron
- Sherry Jackson as Jenny
- Ed Hinton as Al Richie
- William Fawcett as Pappy Cole
- House Peters Jr. as Rocky Steuber

== Production ==
Parts of the film were shot in Rockville Road, Kanab Canyon, Cave Lakes, Barracks Canyon and Three Lakes in Utah.
