= Sherry Jackson =

American actress (born 1942)

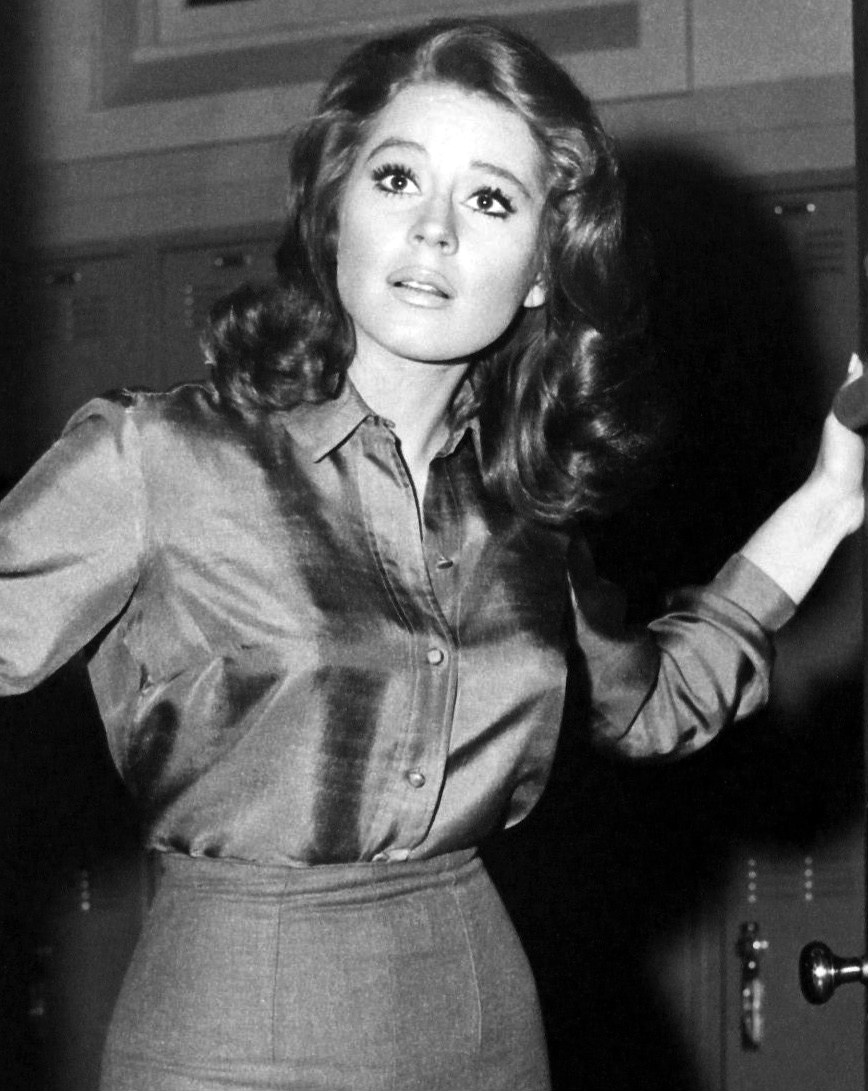
- Jackson on an episode of Mr. Novak in 1963
- Born: Sherry D. Jackson; February 15, 1942 (age 84); Wendell, Idaho, US
- Occupation: Actress
- Years active: 1949–1982
- Known for: The Danny Thomas Show; The Miracle of Our Lady of Fatima; The Breaking Point; Star Trek: "What Are Little Girls Made Of?"; Perry Mason: "The Case of the Festive Felon" (Season 7, Episode 9)
- Partner(s): Fletcher R. Jones (1967 – died 1972)
- Relatives: Montgomery Pittman (stepfather)
- Awards: Hollywood Walk of Fame

Sherry D. Jackson (born February 15, 1942) is an American retired actress and former child star.

== Early life ==
Jackson was born on February 15, 1942, in Wendell, Idaho. Her mother, Maurita, provided drama, singing, and dancing lessons for Sherry and her two brothers, Curtis L. Jackson Jr., and Gary L. Jackson, beginning in their formative years. Her father, Curtis L. Jackson Sr., died when she was 6, and Maurita moved the family from Wendell to Los Angeles, California.

By one account Maurita, who had been told while still in Idaho that her children should be in films, was referred to a theatrical agent by a tour bus driver whom they met in Los Angeles. According to another, she was referred by the friend of an agent who saw Sherry eating ice cream on the Sunset Strip. Within the year Sherry had her first screen test, for The Snake Pit with Olivia de Havilland, and by the age of seven appeared in her first feature film, the 1949 musical You're My Everything, which starred Anne Baxter and Dan Dailey.

In 1950, young Sherry became friends with actor Steve Cochran while working with him on The Lion and the Horse. Steve introduced his friend, writer Montgomery Pittman, to Sherry's widowed mother. A romance developed, and Pittman married Maurita Jackson in a small ceremony on June 4, 1952, in Torrance, California, with Sherry as flower girl and younger brother Gary as ring-bearer; Cochran himself was Pittman's best man. In 1955 Cochran hired Pittman to write his next film, Come Next Spring, the first that Cochran produced himself. Sherry played the part of Cochran's mute daughter Annie Ballot, a role Pittman wrote specifically for his step-daughter.

During the course of appearing in several of the Ma and Pa Kettle movies during the 1950s as Susie Kettle, one of the titular couple's numerous children, Jackson also appeared in The Breaking Point, which starred John Garfield in his penultimate film role. In 1952 she portrayed the emotionally volatile visionary and ascetic Jacinta Marto in The Miracle of Our Lady of Fatima and the following year played John Wayne's daughter in the football-themed Trouble Along the Way.

== Make Room for Daddy ==
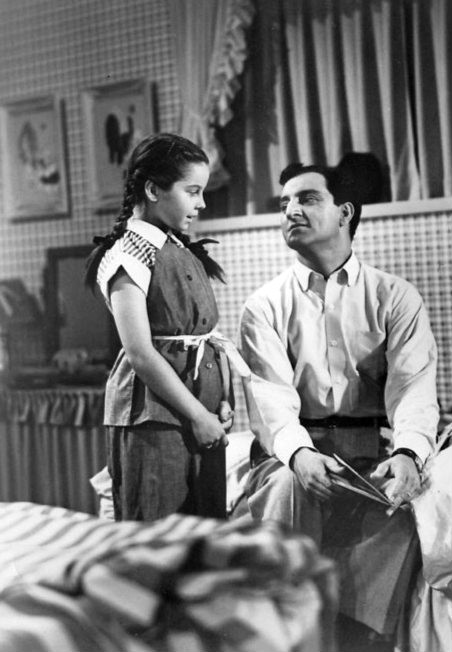
Sherry Jackson with Danny Thomas on Make Room For Daddy (ca. 1955)

Jackson played the older daughter Terry Williams on The Danny Thomas Show (known as Make Room for Daddy during the first three seasons) from 1953 to 1958. During the course of her five years on the series, she established a strong bond with her on-screen mother, Jean Hagen, but Hagen left the series after the third season in 1956.

Worn out from the relentless pace of the production, Jackson left the program at the beginning of season six, once her five-year contract expired. To allow the writers to finish the character off, actress Penney Parker appeared in the role for fourteen episodes of season seven, in which the character gets married and moves away. Jackson's impact on the Danny Thomas viewing audience was such that, on February 8, 1960, she received a star for "Television" at 6324 Hollywood Blvd. on the Hollywood Walk of Fame. Jackson did return as Terry for the premiere episode of the new series Make Room for Granddaddy in 1970.

== Later roles ==
Over the next few years, Jackson broadened her range of acting roles by guest starring in television series, appearing as a hit woman on 77 Sunset Strip, a freed Apache captive who yearns to return to the reservation on The Tall Man, an alcoholic on Mr. Novak, a woman accused of murder on Perry Mason, and an unstable mother-to-be on Wagon Train. Sherry also appeared as a first season guest on The Rifleman episode "The Sister" playing the part of a horse riding sibling of two doting brothers. She played a gunslinger's promiscuous young bride in the Western series Maverick episode entitled "Red Dog" with Roger Moore, Lee Van Cleef and John Carradine. After a 1965 appearance on Gomer Pyle, U.S.M.C., she then made guest appearances on Lost in Space ("The Space Croppers", reuniting with her Danny Thomas co-star, Angela Cartwright), My Three Sons, Gunsmoke, Rawhide, The Wild Wild West ("The Night of the Vicious Valentine" and "The Night of the Gruesome Games", as two different characters), Batman, and the original Star Trek ("What Are Little Girls Made Of?").

When Blake Edwards remade the television series Peter Gunn as a feature film entitled Gunn (1967), Jackson was filmed in a nude scene that appeared only in the international version, not the US release. Stills of the nude scene appeared in the August 1967 issue of Playboy magazine, in a pictorial entitled "Make Room For Sherry". The movie has not been released on VHS or DVD.

In 1968 Jackson co-starred in The Mini-Skirt Mob as a member of an all-female motorcycle gang, and appeared in the 1973 film Cotter opposite Don Murray and Carol Lynley. In subsequent years she appeared in TV movies such as Wild Women (1970), Hitchhike! (1974), The Girl on the Late, Late Show (1974), Returning Home (1975), Enigma (1977), The Curse of the Moon Child (1977) and Casino (1980).

In the 1970s through early 1980s she made guest appearances on TV shows Love, American Style; The Rockford Files; Starsky & Hutch; The Blue Knight; Switch; The Streets of San Francisco; Barnaby Jones; The Incredible Hulk; Fantasy Island; Vega$; Alice; Charlie's Angels and CHiPs.

== Personal life ==
Jackson dated Lance Reventlow while he was estranged from his wife Jill St. John.

In 1967, she began a five-year relationship with business executive and horse breeder Fletcher R. Jones. On November 7, 1972, Jones was killed in a plane crash eight miles east of Santa Ynez Airport in Santa Barbara County, California. Five months after Jones's death, Jackson filed a palimony suit against his estate, asking for more than $1 million (equivalent to $7.3 million in 2025), with her attorneys stating that Jones had promised to provide her with at least $25,000 a year for the rest of her life.

Jackson has a star for broadcast television on the Hollywood Walk of Fame at 6324 Hollywood Boulevard.

== Filmography ==
=== Film ===
Year	Title	Role	Notes	Ref(s)
1950	Covered Wagon Raid	Susie Davis		
1950	The Breaking Point	Amy Morgan		
1951	When I Grow Up	Ruthie Reed		
1951	Lorna Doone	Young Annie Ridd		
1951	Hello God	Little Italian Girl		
1952	The Miracle of Our Lady of Fatima	Jacinta Marto		
1952	The Lion and the Horse	Jenny		
1952	This Woman is Dangerous	Susan Halleck		
1953	Trouble Along the Way	Carole Williams		
1956	Come Next Spring	Annie		
1960	The Adventures of Huckleberry Finn	Mary Jane Wilkes		
1965	Wild on the Beach	Lee Sullivan	(Lippert Productions Ltd., 20th Century Fox)	
1967	Gunn	Samantha	(Geoffrey Productions, Paramount Pictures)	
1968	The Mini-Skirt Mob	Connie		
1969	The Monitors	Mona	(Commonwealth United Entertainment)	
1973	Cotter	Shasta		
1977	Bare Knuckles	Jennifer Randall		
1978	Stingray	Abigail Bratowski		

=== Television ===
Year	Title	Role	Notes	Ref(s)
1949–1951	Fireside Theatre	Little Girl	2 episodes	
1951–1952	The Range Rider	Susan Harper / Virginia Lee	2 episodes	
1951–1952	The Gene Autry Show	Bonnie Ford / Frankie Scott	2 episodes	
1952	The Roy Rogers Show	Lucy Collins	Episode: "Unwilling Outlaw"	
1953–1958	The Danny Thomas Show	Terry Williams	133 episodes	
1953	The Ford Television Theatre	Terry Pelham	Episode: "All's Fair in Love"	
1953	Lux Video Theatre	Ruthie Hammond	Episode: "Look, He's Proposing!"	
1953	Private Secretary		Episode: "Child Labor"	
1954	Shower of Stars	Terry Williams	Episode: "Entertainment on Wheels"	
1954	Mystery is My Business		Episode: "Woman in the Chair"	
1956	The Charles Farrell Show	Julie	Episode: "Charlie's Secret Love"	
1957–1961	Maverick	Erma Curran / Annie Haines	2 episodes	
1958	The Rifleman	Rebecca Snipe	Episode: "The Sister"	
1959–1960	77 Sunset Strip	Ophir / Shirley Bent / Ella / Chris Benson / Carrie	5 episodes	
1960	The Swamp Fox	Melanie Culpin	2 episodes	
1960	The Millionaire	Susan Johnson	Episode: "Millionaire Susan Johnson"	
1960	The Many Loves of Dobie Gillis	Mignonne McCurdy	Episode: "The Prettiest Collateral in Town"	
1960	Surfside 6	Jill Murray	Episode: "High Tide"	
1960	Riverboat	Inez Cox	Episode: "The Water of Gorgeous Springs"	
1961	Bringing Up Buddy	Janie	Episode: "Buddy and Janie"	
1961	The Tall Man	Sally Bartlett	Episode: "Apache Daughter"	
1962	The New Breed	Ellen Talltree	Episode: "Care is No Cure"	
1962	The Twilight Zone	Comfort Gatewood	Episode: "The Last Rites of Jeff Myrtlebank"	
1962	Hawaiian Eye	Joan Carmichael	Episode: "A Scent of Whales"	
1962	Gunsmoke	Aggie / Lacey Parcher	2 episodes	
1963	Vacation Playhouse	Alice Watson	Episode: "Come a-Runnin"	
1963	Mr. Novak	Cathy Ferguson	Episode: "The Risk"	
1963	Perry Mason	Madeline Randall	Episode: "The Case of the Festive Felon"	
1964	The Lieutenant	Maggie Shea	Episode: "Gone the Sun"	
1964	Wagon Train	Geneva Balfour	Episode: "The Geneva Balfour Story"	
1965	Rawhide	Mar	Episode: "Moment in the Sun"	
1965	Gomer Pyle, U.S.M.C.	Geraldine	Episode: "Sergeant Carter Gets a Dear John Letter"	
1965	The Virginian	Lois Colter	Episode: "Show Me a Hero"	
1966	Branded	Nell Beckwith	Episode: "Barbed Wire"	
1966	Lost in Space	Effra	Episode: "The Space Croppers"	
1966	My Three Sons	Linda June Mitchell	Episode: "The Wheels"	
1966	Batman	Pauline	2 episodes	
1966	Death Valley Days	Katherine Turner	Episode: "Lady of the Plains"	
1966	Star Trek	Andrea	S1:E7, "What Are Little Girls Made Of?"	
1967–1968	The Wild Wild West	Lola Cortez / Michele LeMaster	2 episodes	
1970	The Interns	Jeri Spencer	Episode: "The Quality of Mercy"	
1970	Make Room for Granddaddy	Terry Williams	Episode: "Make Room for Grandson"	
1970	The Immortal	Sherry Hiller	Episode: "Sylvia"	
1970	Wild Women	Nancy Belacourt	TV movie	
1971	Love, American Style	Blanche	Segment: "Love and the Waitress"	
1974	Hitchhike!	Stefanie	TV movie	
1974	The Girl on the Late, Late Show	Pat Clauson	TV movie	
1974	Chase	Shirley	Episode: "$35 Will Fly You to the Moon"	
1975	Returning Home	Marie Derry	ABC Movie of the Week	
1975	Barbary Coast	Sherry	Episode: "Crazy Cats"	
1975	Mobile One	Leslie Willis	Episode: "The Pawn"	
1975	The Rockford Files	Jennifer Sandstrom	Episode: "The Real Easy Red Dog"	
1975	Matt Helm	Elena Bosworth	Episode: "Double Jeopardy"	
1976	Starsky & Hutch	Denise Girard	Episode: "Bounty Hunter"	
1976	The Blue Knight	Mrs. Bonner	Episode: "The Rose and the Gun"	
1976	Switch	Jennie Rosenthal	Episode: "The 100,000 Ruble Rumble"	
1977	The Streets of San Francisco	Jackie Allen / Joy Adams / September Dawn	Episode: "One Last Trick"	
1977	Enigma	Kate Valentine	TV movie	
1978	Barnaby Jones	Erica Hughes	2 episodes	
1978	The Incredible Hulk	Dr. Diane Joseph	Episode: "Earthquakes Happen"	
1979	Fantasy Island	Monica Jensen	Episode: "Cowboy/Substitute Wife"	
1979	Vega$	Denise	Episode: "The Usurper"	
1980	Alice	Toni Morelli	Episode: "Good Buddy Flo"	
1980	Charlie's Angels	Tina Fuller	Episode: "Homes $weet Homes"	
1980	CHiPs	Diane	Episode: "The Strippers"	
1980	Casino	Jennifer	TV movie	

== Bibliography ==
- Best, Marc. Those Endearing Young Charms: Child Performers of the Screen, South Brunswick and New York: Barnes & Co., 1971, pp. 122–127.
