= James Westmoreland (actor) =

American actor (1935–2016)

- Born: James Westmoreland; November 25, 1935; Dearborn, Michigan
- Died: September 14, 2016 (aged 80); Palm Desert, California
- Other name: Rad Fulton
- Occupation: Actor
- Years active: 1956–1987
- Spouse: Kim Darby (m. 1970; div. 1970)

James Westmoreland, also known and credited as Rad Fulton (November 25, 1935 – September 14, 2016), was an American actor in films and television from 1956 to 1987.

== Early years ==
Westmoreland was born in Dearborn, Michigan and graduated from Cooley High School in Detroit. He went to New York City to pursue a modeling career and met film agent Henry Willson, who persuaded him to go to Hollywood. Willson had represented several well-known actors and actresses including Rhonda Fleming and Rock Hudson. Westmoreland arrived in Los Angeles in 1954 and Willson gave him the stage name of Rad Fulton.

== Career ==
Credited as Fulton, Westmoreland's movie debut was the part of Walter Brennan's son in Come Next Spring, which also starred Ann Sheridan and Steve Cochran. Westmoreland later said Cochran helped to launch his acting career and "was like an older brother". Although he made thirteen movies from 1956 to 1960, he was uncredited in all but four.

He was given more recognition in television, where he made his debut in a 1957 episode of The West Point Story. He appeared in Alfred Hitchcock Presents twice in the late 1950s and went to appear in episodes of other series including Laramie and Route 66.

In 1963, Westmoreland's career as Fulton had not taken off and Willson decided to end their association. Willson claimed that "Rad Fulton" was a name belonging to him and demanded that Westmoreland stop using it. Credited as James Westmoreland, however, his television career improved and, as well as guest roles, he also secured recurring ones in series like General Hospital, as Teddy Holmes; The Monroes, as Ruel Jaxon; and The Young and the Restless, as Decker.

== Personal life and death ==
Westmoreland married actress Kim Darby in 1970, having met her only three weeks previously. The marriage lasted 47 days until it ended in divorce. He retired from acting in 1980, although he did make another couple of TV appearances in the next decade. Aged 80, Westmoreland died on September 14, 2016, in a Palm Desert hospital near his home in La Quinta, California.

== Filmography ==
=== Film ===
- Come Next Spring (1956) – Bob Storys (credited as Rad Fulton)
- The Girl He Left Behind (1956) – Recruit (uncredited)
- Toward the Unknown (1956) – Pilot (uncredited)
- Hold Back the Night (1956) – Radio Operator (uncredited)
- The Women of Pitcairn Island (1956) – Robert Brown (as Rad Fulton)
- Joy Ride (1958) – Paul (as Rad Fulton)
- High School Confidential! (1958) – Boy (uncredited)
- No Time for Sergeants (1958) – Inductee (uncredited)
- Marjorie Morningstar (1958) – Actor playing 'Romeo' (uncredited)
- Lafayette Escadrille (1958) – Wally Winter (uncredited)
- The Young Philadelphians (1959) – Airline Ticket Agent (uncredited)
- The Crowded Sky (1960) – Rocky (uncredited)
- Hell Bent for Leather (1960) – Moon (as Rad Fulton)
- No My Darling Daughter (1961) – Cornelius Allingham (as Rad Fulton)
- The Last Sunset (1961) – Julesburg Kid (as Rad Fulton)
- Journey Beneath the Desert (1961) – Robert (as Rad Fulton)
- The Undertaker and His Pals (1966) – Harry Glass (as Rad Fulton)
- Stacey (1973) – Frank Elroy
- Don't Answer the Phone! (1980) – Lt. Chris McCabe

=== Television ===
Year	Title	Role	Notes
1957	The West Point Story	Unnamed character (as Rad Fulton)	Season 1, episode 31: "Flareup"
1958	Lux Video Theatre	Sean (as Rad Fulton)	Season 1, episode 2: "The Four"
1958–1959	Alfred Hitchcock Presents	(1) Ads in press receptionist (as Rad Fulton) (2) Lester (as Rad Fulton)	Season 3, episode 32: "Listen, Listen.....!" as (1); Season 4, episode 23: "I'll Take Care Of You" as (2)
1959	The Restless Gun	Frank Kolter (as Rad Fulton)	Season 2, episode 35: "The Cavis Boy"
1960	Laramie	Johnny Leach (as Rad Fulton)	Season 1, episode 21: "The Company Man"
1960	The Many Loves of Dobie Gillis	Paisan (as Rad Fulton)	Season 1, episode 16: "The Fist Fighter"
1960	Bronco	Jim Younger (as Rad Fulton)	Season 2, episode 9: "The Shadow of Jesse James"
1962	Route 66	Second Surfer (as Rad Fulton)	Season 3, episode 4: "Ever Ride the Waves in Oklahoma?"
1963	General Hospital	Teddy Holmes	Recurring role
1966	The Wild Wild West	Chandra	Season 2, episode 2: "The Night of the Golden Cobra"
1966	Hank	Male Patient	Season 1, episode 26: "Operation Matriculation"
1966–1967	The Monroes	Ruel Jaxon	Recurring role, 12 episodes
1967	The Guns of Will Sonnett	Lafe Banner	Season 1, episode 9: "First Love"
1973	The Young and the Restless	Decker	Recurring role
1977	Emergency!	Grip Foreman	Season 6, episode 18: "Firehouse Quintet"
1984	T. J. Hooker	Paul Butler	Season 3, episode 17: "Hot Property"
1987	Mike Hammer	Saunders	Season 3, episode 16: "Green Blizzard"
