= Highway 301 (film) =

1950 film by Andrew L. Stone

- Theatrical release poster
- Directed by: Andrew L. Stone
- Written by: Andrew L. Stone
- Produced by: Bryan Foy
- Starring: Steve Cochran; Virginia Grey
- Narrated by: Edmon Ryan
- Cinematography: Carl Guthrie
- Edited by: Owen Marks
- Music by: William Lava
- Distributed by: Warner Bros. Pictures
- Release dates: December 8, 1950 (New York); December 13, 1950 (Los Angeles)
- Running time: 83 minutes
- Country: United States
- Language: English
- Budget: $530,000
- Box office: $1,604,000

Highway 301 is an American 1950 film noir written and directed by Andrew L. Stone and starring Steve Cochran, Virginia Grey, Gaby André and Edmon Ryan.

== Plot ==
Governors William P. Lane of Maryland, John S. Battle of Virginia and W. Kerr Scott of North Carolina each address the audience to express support for the film and its moral message regarding the evils of criminal activity.

A gang of career criminals, modeled on the real life Tri-State Gang, are terrorizing and robbing banks and payrolls in North Carolina, Virginia and Maryland. George, the gang's leader, is a cold killer who does not distinguish between armed guards and any of the group's moll that cross him.

All five of the gang members are caught or killed. One of the molls is killed by a shot from the gang's leader, a second is shot and lies in a coma before recovering and a third is arrested while impersonating a reporter.

== Cast ==
- Steve Cochran as George Legenza
- Virginia Grey as Mary Simms
- Gaby André as Lee
- Edmon Ryan as Detective Sgt. Truscott and the film's narrator
- Robert Webber as William B. "Bill" Phillips
- Wally Cassell as Robert 'Bobby' Mais
- Aline Towne as Madeline Welton
- Richard Egan as Herbie Brooks
- Edward Norris as Noyes Hinton, gang driver
- Lyle Latell as Police Officer Murray

== Production ==
During filming of a scene on location at a Los Angeles-area bank, Steve Cochran, in character as George Legenza, ran from the bank armed and with an armload of cash, attracting the attention of a real-life police patrol car from which officers emerged with weapons drawn, believing that an actual bank robbery was taking place.

== Release ==
Highway 301 premiered in Maryland, North Carolina and Virginia, the states in which the film takes place, as well as in Washington, D.C., on December 7, 1950.

According to Warner Bros. records, the film earned $759,000 in the U.S. and $845,000 in other markets.

== Reception ==
In a contemporary review for The New York Times, critic Bosley Crowther called Highway 301 "cheap gangster melodrama" and referenced the opening addresses from the three governors, writing: "[T]hese eminent and honorable officials convey the solemn idea that what you are about to see is something that will prove to you how profitless crime is. And what you see is conventional modern-day cops-and-robbers film, based on the dismal depredations of the so-called Tri-State gang, in which robbing and shooting and violence are exhibited for pure sensation's sake, with the gangsters annihilated in a juicy blood-bath at the end. ... [T]he whole thing ... is a straight exercise in low sadism."

Critic John L. Scott of the Los Angeles Times wrote: "For a modest-budgeted picture it is okay and should please action fans ... All characters are played with a minimum of histrionics, which gives added realism to the piece."
