= Come Next Spring =

1956 film

- Directed by: R. G. Springsteen
- Written by: Montgomery Pittman
- Produced by: Herbert J. Yates; Steve Cochran
- Starring: Ann Sheridan; Steve Cochran; Walter Brennan
- Cinematography: Jack A. Marta
- Edited by: Tony Martinelli
- Music by: Max Steiner
- Production company: Republic Pictures
- Distributed by: Republic Pictures
- Release date: March 9, 1956
- Running time: 92 minutes
- Country: United States
- Language: English

Come Next Spring is a 1956 American Trucolor drama film directed by R. G. Springsteen and starring Ann Sheridan, Steve Cochran and Walter Brennan. It was produced and distributed by Republic Pictures. The theme song, "Come Next Spring", with music by Max Steiner and lyrics by Lenny Adelson, was performed by Tony Bennett. It was covered by Scott Walker on his 1968 album Scott 2. Steiner wrote the score for the film, reusing much of his work from Sergeant York.

== Plot ==
Alcoholic Matt Ballot (Steve Cochran) abandoned his wife Bess (Ann Sheridan) and mute daughter Annie (Sherry Jackson) in Arkansas nine years ago. Now sober, he returns to discover Bess gave birth to a son, Abe (Richard Eyer), after he left. Bess grudgingly hires him as a handyman. Hytower (Sonny Tufts) wants to marry Bess and tries to make Matt jealous and picks a fight with him. Matt endears himself to his kids by defending them from wild pigs and a group of local bullies. He risks Annie's love by admitting that she was in the car when he drunkenly wrecked it. Although she was unhurt, she never spoke again. Annie embraces him. Matt later saves a child and Annie during an approaching tornado.

Bess is upset when Matt has a single drink at a dance to prove he can stop at just one drink, but fistfights Hytower. Matt rescues Bess when, overcome by emotion and departing the dance, she stalls her truck while fording a creek. Annie falls into an old mine shaft, but Matt rescues her. Bess finally admits she is back in love with Matt.

== Cast ==
- Ann Sheridan as Bess Ballot
- Steve Cochran as Matt Ballot
- Walter Brennan as Jeffrey Storys
- Sherry Jackson as Annie Ballot
- Richard Eyer as Abraham Ballot
- Edgar Buchanan as Mr. Canary
- Sonny Tufts as Leroy Hytower
- Harry Shannon as Mr. Totter
- James Westmoreland as Bob Storys (as Rad Fulton)
- Mae Clarke as Myrtle
- Roscoe Ates as Shorty Wilkins
- Wade Ruby as Delbert Meaner
- James Best as Bill Jackson

== Production ==
Steve Cochran formed Robert Alexander Productions after his actual first two names. Come Next Spring was his first film, written by Cochran's friend Montgomery Pittman and featuring Pittman's stepdaughter Sherry Jackson. Filmed in locations around Sacramento, Republic promised Cochran an "A Picture" release but released it as the lower half of a double feature.

== Critical reception ==
Writing in The Village Voice, Farran Smith Nehme noted that "Both [Sheridan and Cochran] give lovely performances; their first reunion, delivered with clean sincerity, is a marvel of things left unsaid," adding that "the movie is sentimental in a way that shouldn’t be taken as a pejorative." A review of the film by Gina Telaroli for Mubi described it as "quite a frank film that deals with some pretty rough stuff, like how devastatingly hard it can be to trust someone who has betrayed you," and having "a great Walter Brennan performance" with a "terrifying cliff-bound scene at the end."
