= The Undertaker and His Pals =

1966 American horror film directed by T. L. P. Swicegood

- theatrical release poster
- Directed by: T. L. P. Swicegood
- Screenplay by: T. L. P. Swicegood
- Produced by: Alex Grattan
- Starring: Warrene Ott; James Westmoreland; Robert Lowery; Ray Dannis
- Cinematography: Andrew Janczak
- Edited by: Thomas Luther
- Music by: Johnny White
- Production company: Eola Productions
- Distributed by: Geneni Film Distribution; Howco Int'l Pictures
- Release date: November 30, 1966 (Birmingham, Alabama)
- Running time: 60 minutes
- Country: United States
- Language: English

The Undertaker and His Pals is a 1966 American horror comedy film directed by T. L. P. Swicegood. The film stars Warrene Ott; James Westmoreland, billed under the name "Rad Fulton"; Robert Lowery, billed as "Guest Star"; and Ray Dannis as The Undertaker. It features Marty Friedman, Sally Frei and Rick Cooper.

== Plot ==
Three men, clad in face-obscuring motorcycle gear, pick a woman's name out of the phonebook. They travel to her apartment, break in, and murder her with knives. They then sever her legs from her body, and take her dismembered limbs with them.

The killers are revealed to be Mr. Mort, the local undertaker, and two restaurant owners, Spike and Doc. (Who got his nickname from being a former medical student).

The killers serve the body parts as the restaurant's "daily special" (with each dish being a pun on the victim's last name).

Harry Glass is a private detective whose secretary (and girlfriend) Ann Poultry, is killed by the bikers. Investigating the crime scene, the police surmise the killers to be bikers. Mr Mort approaches Harry and attempts to have him sign an un-billed contract for the funeral (and have him pay exorbitant rates for the funeral expenses, as he did with the first victim's parents). Harry outwits him by putting the low price on the contract, then signing it.

Going back to the diner (which he and his girlfriend had visited earlier) Harry vows to catch the killers. Doc then kills a deliveryman when he discovers the body parts in the freezer. A customer attempts to order, and, thinking he is being pranked, throws a pie in Spike’s face.

Glass goes to Ann's funeral, which Mort has made as cheap as possible, in revenge for being tricked out of the money earlier. Incensed, Glass assaults Mort, then leaves.

Glass's new secretary, a woman named Friday, arrives at his office. After being hired, she then leaves for the cafe, where Spike and Doc capture her, then cut her up with a scalpel. Mr Mort arrives, then becomes angry when the two tell him they dissolved the body in a vat of acid. To make it up to him, the trio travel to a woman’s home, murdering her by whipping her with a length of chain. Her friends arrive, and, seeing what happened, attempt to shoot at the fleeing bikers, wounding Mr Mort and knocking off his motorcycle's license plate in the process.

The police find the missing license plate and connect it to Mr Mort. After the killers return to the restaurant, Doc and Spike confront Mr Mort for his bullet wound and missing license plate, knowing the cops would be led right to them.

Spike suggests dropping Mr Mort into the vat of acid, but Mort convinces Doc to help him lower Spike in instead. Glass, learning from an informant that Mort hangs out with Spike and Doc, searches their restaurant, finding Spike’s skeleton in the acid vat. He is surprised by Friday’s identical twin sister, Thursday, who followed him to try and find her missing sister. The two then become a couple.

Stopping at a nearby phone booth, Harry calls Police Detective Jennings, and tells him of the killers' identities. Unbeknownst to Harry, the bikers follow him to his home, where he has Thursday spend the night.

In the morning, driving to work, Harry's car runs out of gas. He flags down a passing motorist to go to the local gas station, while Thursday waits in his car. The bikers arrive, and attack her on their motorcycles. As they chase Thursday down the road, Doc is hit by a semi truck, while Mort gets away.

Mr Mort builds a bomb, which he then throws into Glass's office, killing him. He attempts to kill Thursday, who flees to the rooftop. He lunges at her, but falls to his apparent death. Thursday flees back into the building, but Mort survived. As he stalks her back to Glass's office, hidden by a curtain, Detective Jennings inadvertently kills him when he gestures around with a knife, stabbing Mort in the head. At the end of the film, all of the actors playing the supposedly dead characters "come alive" again, one by one.

== Production ==
Production began on September 13, 1965. Studio filming took place at Alpha Omega Studios in Glendale, California, while location scenes were shot in Los Angeles and Glendale.

== Release ==
The Undertaker and His Pals premiered in Birmingham, Alabama on November 30, 1966. Originally, some gore scenes were created with the insertion of real medical surgery footage. When acquired by Ted V. Mikels for a triple bill of the Italian horror movie The Embalmer and his own film The Corpse Grinders, he cut out the majority of the gore scenes and a sequence with Ray Dannis in drag as an old lady. Reported in some sources as approximately 80 minutes in length, Mikels' cut of the film ran a little over an hour. It was released on home video by MTI Home Video and, since then, as part of many public domain DVD sets.

== Reception ==
Variety stated that the film "borrowed every gimmick from horror and macabre comedy films, with a resultant mish-mash which is difficult to appraise viewer-wise."

In a retrospective review, Fred Beldin of AllMovie described the film as an "incredibly weird horror comedy", noting unfunny jokes and unrealistic gore with hammy acting but that the film "revels in its own inappropriateness so completely that it's impossible to forget." and that it was "highly recommended for those who revel in bad taste."

== Censorship ==
Police in Louisville, Kentucky confiscated a print of the film based on a local law which banned "the publication of materials dealing with bloodshed, lust or crime." After the statute was declared to be unconstitutional by the Louisville Quarterly Court, the print was returned.

In Clarksville, Indiana a local Parents-Teachers Association and a number of women's groups complained about the film, and the theater cancelled showings.
