= South of Santa Fe (1942 film) =

1942 film by Joseph Kane

- Directed by: Joseph Kane
- Written by: James R. Webb
- Produced by: Joseph Kane (associate producer)
- Starring: See below
- Cinematography: Harry Neumann
- Edited by: William P. Thompson
- Distributed by: Republic Pictures
- Release date: 17 February 1942
- Running time: 55 minutes
- Country: United States
- Language: English

South of Santa Fe is a 1942 American Western film directed by Joseph Kane.

== Cast ==
- Roy Rogers as Roy Rogers
- George "Gabby" Hayes as Gabby Whittaker
- Linda Hayes as Carol Stevens
- Paul Fix as Joe Keenan, aka Harmon
- Arthur Loft as Peter Moreland
- Charles F. Miller as John McMahon
- Sam Flint as Harold Prentiss
- Jack Kirk as Sheriff Benton
- Sons of the Pioneers as Cowhands / Musicians
