= Slander (1957 film) =

1957 film by Roy Rowland

- Directed by: Roy Rowland
- Written by: Jerome Weidman
- Based on: Public Figure; 1956 teleplay by Harry W. Junkin
- Produced by: Armand Deutsch
- Starring: Van Johnson; Ann Blyth; Steve Cochran
- Cinematography: Harold J. Marzorati
- Edited by: George Boemler
- Music by: Jeff Alexander
- Production company: Metro-Goldwyn-Mayer
- Distributed by: Metro-Goldwyn-Mayer
- Release dates: January 16, 1957 (New York and Los Angeles)
- Running time: 81 minutes
- Country: United States
- Language: English
- Budget: $926,000
- Box office: $745,000

Slander is a 1957 American drama film directed by Roy Rowland and starring Van Johnson, Ann Blyth and Steve Cochran. It was produced and distributed by Metro-Goldwyn-Mayer. The film centers on a scandal magazine similar to the real-life Confidential and Whisper gossip magazines, which had published "smear" stories about many celebrities, including Johnson.

Despite the film's title, its plot concerns written material, which would possibly become the grounds for defamation litigation as the tort of libel, not slander, which applies only to oral communication. Furthermore, in the United States, defamation suits only have legal merit if the content is proven to be false, but the plot centers on the publication of a factual event in a man's past that he admits to be truthful.

== Plot ==
Ruthless scandal magazine editor and publisher H. R. Manley of the tabloid publication The Real Truth has earned a fortune by publishing tawdry, but true, stories that have ruined many lives. His elderly mother is appalled at his methods and greed. Despite his success, Manley owes $100,000 to the magazine's printer and craves a hot topic to stimulate sales, and he decides to pursue a scandalous story about movie star Mary Sawyer. Following a lead, Manley discovers that Sawyer has a damaging secret from her past known to no one but her longtime friend Scott Martin.

Scott is a puppeteer who has just started a very successful children's television show after years of struggling to make ends meet for his wife Connie and their young son Joey. Manley discovers that Scott once served four years in prison for an armed robbery, a secret unknown to the general public. Manley confronts Connie with a preview of the exposé article with all of the details of Scott's crime and a large image of Scott in prison garb. Connie, who is aware of her husband's past, explains why the crime occurred, but Manley is unmoved. He threatens to publish the article unless Scott provides information about Sawyer's secret in time for the magazine's next edition.

Connie informs Scott and his agent Seth about Manley's demand and implores him to divulge Sawyer's secret and preserve his nascent television career in the interest of supporting his family. Scott, realizing that the publication of his secret will destroy his career, wavers before flatly refusing to betray Sawyer, and Connie leaves him. Manley proceeds to publish Scott's secret and a public outcry ensues. Scott's show's sponsor, wishing to distance itself from the scandal, drops him. At school, when Joey is mercilessly taunted, he runs into the street to escape his tormentors and is struck by a car and killed.

Manley's mother visits Connie to confirm her son's connection with Joey's death. Scott is invited to appear on a television show in which he delivers a moving appeal to viewers about his son's death and the poisonous publication that caused the event. Watching the program with his mother, Manley phones a colleague to hurry to increase distribution of his next issue, believing that Scott's public rebuke will provide a great boost for the magazine's sales. His disgusted mother removes a revolver from a desk drawer and shoots him dead.

Seth informs Scott that his televised speech has triggered public outrage about the magazine and its brand of shady journalism, but Scott is skeptical that it will bring about any lasting changes.

== Cast ==
- Van Johnson as Scott Martin
- Ann Blyth as Connie Martin
- Steve Cochran as H. R. Manley
- Marjorie Rambeau as Mrs. Manley
- Richard Eyer as Joey
- Harold J. Stone as Seth
- Philip Coolidge as Homer Crowley
- Malcom Atterbury as Byron (uncredited)
- Robert Burton as Harry Walsh (uncredited)
- Jonathan Hole as Cereal Company Executive (uncredited)
- Dean Jones as Newscaster (uncredited)
- Harry Tyler as Willis (uncredited)
- Irene Tedrow as Marion Gregg (uncredited)

== Reception ==
In a contemporary review for The New York Times, critic Bosley Crowther called Scandal "as simple and artless as a lesson in how to tie your shoes" and wrote:

"Slander" equates the villain and the nice people with cliché clarity. It makes scandal-mongering the menace of free enterprise, parental love and the American home. This may be so, but "Slander" puts it so mawkishly that the torments developed by such practice seems much less severe than they must be. Also, the script by Jerome Weidman places virtually all the blame for the "smear" magazines upon the publishers without reflecting upon the state of public taste. The fact that the comfortable inhabitants of several million American homes support these magazines is not inspected. "Slender" is the word for this film.

Critic Edwin Schallert of the Los Angeles Times wrote:

"Slander" is a picture that attempts to slash at slander publications, and consequently has a creditable objective. The trouble with this film ... is that it goes too far in some ways, but in most ways doesn't proceed sufficiently far. It becomes a sort of monotone that ends all too abruptly and incompletely, and while the picture will momentarily tend to rouse people against the kind of publication that is depicted, the story itself tends to tumble apart. ... [T]he whole feature ends in midair, leaving one with the curious sense that not too much has been accomplished toward curing an ill. ... One feels somewhat as if [Weidman] had been gazing at an example of the old MGM Crime Doesn't Pay [sic] series extended and amplified.

According to MGM records, the film earned $370,000 in the U.S. and Canada and $375,000 elsewhere, returning a loss to the studio of $535,000.

== See also ==
- List of American films of 1957
