= Trouble Along the Way =

1953 film by Michael Curtiz

- Directed by: Michael Curtiz
- Screenplay by: Jack Rose; Melvill Shavelson; James Edward Grant (revisions) (uncredited)
- Story by: Robert Hardy Andrews; Douglas Morrow
- Produced by: Melville Shavelson
- Starring: John Wayne; Donna Reed; Charles Coburn; Sherry Jackson
- Cinematography: Archie Stout
- Edited by: Owen Marks
- Music by: Max Steiner
- Distributed by: Warner Bros. Pictures
- Release date: April 4, 1953
- Running time: 110 minutes
- Country: United States
- Language: English
- Box office: $2.45 million (US)

Trouble Along the Way is a 1953 American sports comedy film directed by Michael Curtiz and starring John Wayne and Donna Reed, with a supporting cast including Charles Coburn and Marie Windsor. The black-and-white film was released by Warner Bros. Pictures with an aspect ratio of 1.37:1.

== Plot ==
Small, obscure St. Anthony's College, a Jesuit Catholic university, is in dire financial straits and about to be closed. To save it, and himself from forced retirement, elderly rector Father Burke hires a down-and-out former big-time football coach, Steve Williams, in hopes of building a lucrative sports program. First turning down the job, Williams later accepts it when he learns that his former wife, Anne, now remarried, complained to Social Services that he is an unfit father and plans to sue for custody of their 11-year-old daughter, Carole. Anne's actual aim is not to get Carole, in whom she has no interest, but rather to pressure Steve into having an affair with her.

Social Services worker Alice Singleton, coldly prejudiced against Steve because she suffered from a relationship with her father similar to that between Steve and Carole, is preparing a report in Anne's favor. Steve attempts to charm Alice and win her over. Desperate to have the football program pay off, Father Burke uses his clerical connections to schedule St. Anthony's against high-profile Catholic colleges — Villanova, Notre Dame, etc. — in the upcoming season. Faced with physically inadequate players, Steve uses chicanery to enroll beefy star athletes as freshmen and build a winning team. Father Burke learns of Steve's dishonest methods, reprimands him, and disbands the sports program, knowing this will cause St. Anthony's to close. Alice submits a report unfavorable to Steve, but she repudiates it in the court custody hearing after recognizing her bias and Anne's lack of honest affection for Carole. Under questioning Alice reveals she may be in love with Steve and testifies that he is not a properly responsible parent.

The judge halts proceedings and places Carole in custody of the State. He assigns her a new case worker until matters can be sorted out. In a surprise move, the Church agrees to continue funding St. Anthony's. Burke nevertheless resigns as rector, believing that he had been behaving selfishly to unnecessarily prolong his position. Before leaving, he reinstates Steve as coach and forgives him his unscrupulous behavior, as it was done out of love for his child. The film ends with Carole, accompanied by Alice, walking away from Steve, with the implication that Steve and Alice will wed and the three would be together as a family.

== Cast ==
- John Wayne as Steve Aloysius Williams
- Donna Reed as Alice Singleton
- Charles Coburn as Father Burke
- Tom Tully as Father Malone
- Sherry Jackson as Carole Williams
- Marie Windsor as Anne McCormick
- Tom Helmore as Harold McCormick
- Dabbs Greer as Father Peterson
- Leif Erickson as Father Provincial
- Douglas Spencer as Procurator
- Lester Matthews as Cardinal O'Shea
- Chuck Connors as Stan Schwegler
- James Dean as Football Spectator

== Production ==
Portions of the film were shot at Pomona College and Loyola Marymount University, and various Los Angeles high schools, including Loyola High. Max Steiner provided the music.

== Reception ==
The New York Times gave it a favorable review, citing "spirited and contemporary" dialogue.

Saying that Wayne was "completely at home" in the role, Variety also found the lines "a principal factor" in carrying the film. Craig Butler found the film predictable yet heart warming.

== See also ==
- List of American football films
- John Wayne filmography
