= Inside the Walls of Folsom Prison =

1951 film by Crane Wilbur

- Theatrical release poster
- Directed by: Crane Wilbur
- Written by: Crane Wilbur
- Produced by: Bryan Foy
- Starring: Steve Cochran; David Brian
- Narrated by: William Woodson
- Cinematography: Edwin B. DuPar
- Edited by: Owen Marks
- Music by: William Lava
- Color process: Black and white
- Production company: Warner Bros. Pictures
- Distributed by: Warner Bros. Pictures
- Release date: May 27, 1951 (New York)
- Running time: 87 minutes
- Country: United States
- Language: English

Inside the Walls of Folsom Prison is a 1951 American crime film noir set at Folsom State Prison in California. It was directed by Crane Wilbur and stars Steve Cochran and David Brian.

== Plot ==
During the 1920s, long before the 1944 California prison reform, Warden Ben Rickey rules Folsom Prison with a ruthless hand. He believes that prisons should be used for punishment rather than for rehabilitation to reduce recidivism. His methods are violent, torturous and intended to beat the prisoners into submission.

Chuck Daniels, one of the toughest inmates, and his group of followers are intent on escaping. However, after an attempt that is thwarted by Rickey, a riot ensues, resulting in the deaths of two officers and a few prisoners. Rickey exacts severe and cruel punishments to all prisoners connected to the incident.

In response to increasing violence and the warden's inhumane treatment, the prison's board of directors hires Mark Benson as captain of the guards. He believes that the inmates should receive better treatment and that providing them with education about how to live on the outside will increase their chances of becoming productive members of society. Benson makes many changes to the regimen, including serving meat, allowing inmates to talk during meal times and promoting rehabilitation programs such as employment help. He requires that the guards arrive at work clean, behave in a professional manner and discontinue the senseless beatings.

The changes contravene Rickey's wishes, and Benson eventually leaves his post. With Benson gone, Rickey rescinds all of the reforms and the inmates retaliate with yet another escape attempt. A riot erupts in which many are fatally wounded.

== Cast ==
- Steve Cochran as Chuck Daniels
- David Brian as Mark Benson
- Philip Carey as Red Pardue
- Ted de Corsia as Warden Ben Rickey (as Ted De Corsia)
- Scott Forbes as Jim Frazier
- Michael Tolan as Leo Daly (as Lawrence Tolan)
- Dick Wesson as Tinker
- Paul Picerni as Jeff Riordan
- William Campbell as Nick Ferretti
- Edward Norris as Sgt. Cliff Hart (as Eddie Norris)

== Production ==
The film's working title was The Story of Folsom.

== Reception ==
In a contemporary review for The New York Times, critic A. H. Weiler wrote: "[T]hough Bryan Foy, the producer, who obviously is in favor of reform, pokes his cameras into dark cell blocks, towers, yards and rock quarries of the penitentiary, all he captures is another prison picture indistinguishable from those uninspired melodramas that have come regularly from the West. ... Although several scenes—such as the execution of the attempted escape—give the proceedings some excitement, most of the footage is standard and unimaginative. And, the performances are never above standard."

== Legacy ==
Country singer Johnny Cash viewed the film while serving in the United States Air Force in West Germany in October 1951 and used it as an inspiration for his hit song "Folsom Prison Blues".

Inside the Walls of Folsom Prison is featured in the 2005 biographical film Walk the Line, in which Johnny Cash (played by Joaquin Phoenix) and other Air Force personnel are depicted viewing the film.
