= James R. Webb =

American screenwriter (1909–1974)

- Born: James Ruffin Webb; October 4, 1909; Denver, Colorado, U.S.
- Died: September 27, 1974 (aged 64); Los Angeles, California, U.S.
- Resting place: Los Angeles National Cemetery
- Other name: James Webb
- Education: Stanford University
- Occupation: Screenwriter
- Years active: 1938–1971
- Spouse: Susan Noble
- Children: 2

James Ruffin Webb (October 4, 1909 – September 27, 1974) was an American screenwriter. He was best known for writing the screenplay for the film How the West Was Won (1962), which garnered widespread critical acclaim and earned him an Academy Award.

== Biography ==
=== Early life ===
Webb was born in Denver in 1909 and graduated from Stanford University in 1930. He became a fiction writer for national magazines, including Collier's: The National Weekly, Cosmopolitan, and The Saturday Evening Post, in 1936 and a screenwriter two years later.

=== Early screenplays ===
Webb's early screenplays were written for Republic Pictures. He did a series of films starring Roy Rogers and directed by Joseph Kane: Nevada City (1941), Bad Man of Deadwood (1941), Jesse James at Bay (1941) and South of Santa Fe (1942) with Roy Rogers. He also did Rags to Riches (1941) directed by Kane.

=== World War II ===
Webb was commissioned an army officer in June 1942 and became a personal aide to General Lloyd R. Fredendall who was commander of the II Corps. Webb accompanied Fredendall to England in October 1942 and participated in the invasion of North Africa in November 1942 when the Second Corps captured the city of Oran. The Second Corps then attacked eastward into Tunisia. In February 1943 the German army launched a counterattack at Kasserine Pass which repulsed the Second Corps and nearly broke through the Allied lines. The Supreme Commander Dwight D. Eisenhower relieved Fredendall of command in March 1943 and sent him back to the United States where he became deputy commander of the Second United States Army at Memphis, Tennessee.

Webb returned to the United States with Fredendall and later served in the European Theater.

=== Post-war career ===
Webb left the Army after the war and returned to Hollywood, where he continued his work as a screenwriter. He returned to Republic for California Firebrand (1948).

In 1948 he sold a story to Universal, Going, Going, Gone and was going to write the script but no film resulted. A story of his Fugitive from Love, was filmed as Woman in Hiding (1950).

=== Warner Bros ===
Webb signed a contract for Warner Bros for whom he wrote the Westerns Montana (1950) with Errol Flynn, Raton Pass (1951), and The Big Trees (1952) with Kirk Douglas.

He also wrote Close to My Heart (1951) based on his own novel, Operation Secret (1952), The Iron Mistress (1952) for Alan Ladd, The Charge at Feather River (1953) a 3-D film, and Phantom of the Rue Morgue (1954).

Webb had a big hit with two films for Burt Lancaster and Robert Aldrich: Apache (1954) and Vera Cruz (1954). He wrote episodes of The Millionaire and Cheyenne and Illegal (1955) with Edward G. Robinson.

=== Post-Warner Bros ===
Lancaster hired Webb to do Trapeze (1956). He also wrote The Big Country (1958) and Pork Chop Hill (1959).

Webb received critical acclaim for his screenplays for Cape Fear (1962) and How the West Was Won (1962). He won an Academy Award for Best Story and Screenplay Written Directly for the Screen for the latter.

=== Mirisch Brothers ===
Less well received were Kings of the Sun (1963) for the Mirisch Brothers and Cheyenne Autumn (1964) for John Ford. He wrote an early draft of Chinese Finale that became 7 Women, Ford's last film, but Webb is not credited in the final movie.

Webb wrote the English language version of Guns for San Sebastian (1968) and did a script for Patton.

He did some historical epics: Alfred the Great (1969), for MGM; Sinful Davey (1969) for John Huston and the Mirisches; and The Hawaiians (1970), for the Mirsches.

His last credits were sequels to In the Heat of the Night, both for the Mirsches: They Call Me Mister Tibbs! (1970) and The Organization (1971).

In March 1974 the American Writers Guild awarded him the Morgan Award for services to the guild.

=== Death ===
Webb died on September 27, 1974, and was buried in Los Angeles National Cemetery. He was survived by a wife, a son and a daughter.

== Partial filmography ==
- Nevada City (1941) - original screenplay
- Rags to Riches (1941) - screenplay
- Bad Man of Deadwood (1941) - original screenplay
- Jesse James at Bay (1942) - screenplay
- South of Santa Fe (1942) - original screenplay
- California Firebrand (1948) - story (uncredited)
- South of St. Louis (1949) - screenplay
- Montana (1950) - screenplay
- Raton Pass (1951) - screenplay
- Close to My Heart (1951) - original novel "A Baby for Midge" and screenplay
- The Big Trees (1952) - screenplay
- Operation Secret (1952) - screenplay
- The Iron Mistress (1952) - screenplay
- The Charge at Feather River (1953) - screenplay
- Phantom of the Rue Morgue (1954) - screenplay
- Apache (1954) - screenplay
- Vera Cruz (1954) - screenplay
- The Millionaire - episode "The Joe Iris Story" (1955) - teleplay
- Illegal (1955) - screenplay
- Cheyenne - episode "West of the River" (1956) - teleplay
- Trapeze (1956) - screenplay
- The Big Country (1958) - screenplay
- Pork Chop Hill (1959) - screenplay
- Cape Fear (1962) - screenplay
- How the West Was Won (1963) – screenplay
- Kings of the Sun (1963) - screenplay
- Cheyenne Autumn (1964) - screenplay
- La Bataille de San Sebastian (1968) - English screenplay
- Alfred the Great (1969) - story and screenplay
- Sinful Davey (1969) - screenplay
- The Hawaiians (1970) - screenplay
- They Call Me Mister Tibbs! (1970) - screenplay
- The Organization (1971) - screenplay
