= Tell Me in the Sunlight =

- Directed by: Steve Cochran
- Screenplay by: Steve Cochran; Jo Heims
- Story by: Robert Stevens
- Produced by: Steve Cochran; Arnold Stoltz
- Starring: Steve Cochran
- Cinematography: Rod Yould
- Edited by: David Woods
- Music by: Michael Andersen
- Production company: Brittania Films
- Distributed by: Movie-Rama
- Release date: 1965
- Running time: 82 minutes
- Country: United States
- Language: English

Tell Me in the Sunlight is a 1965 American romantic drama produced, directed, and co-written by and starring Steve Cochran. It was released in 1967, after Cochran's mysterious death.

== Cast ==
- Steve Cochran as Dave
- Shary Marshall as Julie
- Jay Robinson as Barber
- Dave Bondu as Alex
- Patricia Wolf as Chata
- George Hopkins as Tony
- Rockne Tarkington as Rocky
- Harry Franklin as Dr. Franklin

== Production ==
Jo Heims wrote the script from a Robert Stevens story. The film was going to be shot at Herbert Vendig's production base in Freeport, Grand Bahama in 1962. It was also going to be filmed in Brazil and Argentina. He wound up filming it in the Bahamas but when he came home to Hollywood in June 1963 he declared he needed to reshoot it with a new actress. In October 1964 it was announced Cochran would be making the film with Shary Marshall.

== Release ==
Following Cochran's death, in 1967 his mother turned the film over to Films International Distributing Organization.
