= Scott Forbes =

British film and TV actor and screenwriter (1920–1997)

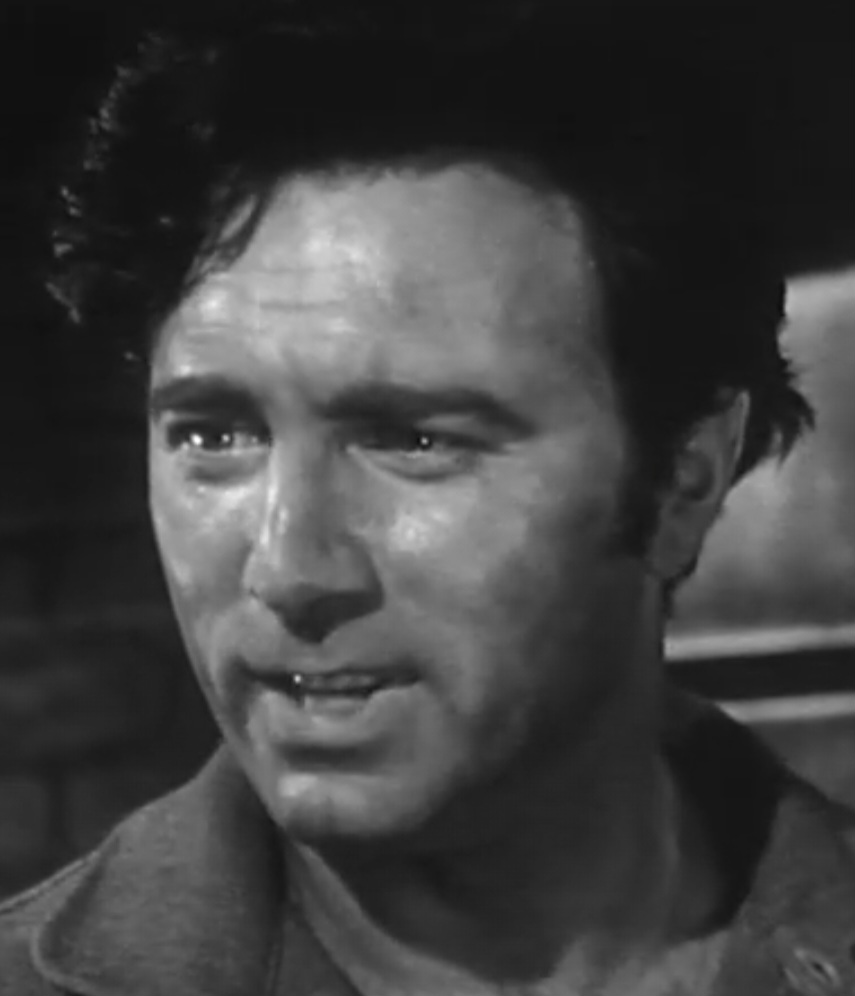
- Forbes in The Adventures of Jim Bowie (1956)
- Born: Conrad Scott Forbes; 11 September 1920; High Wycombe, Buckinghamshire, England, UK
- Died: 25 February 1997 (aged 76); Swindon, Wiltshire, England, UK
- Other names: C. Scott Forbes; Julian Dallas
- Occupations: Actor, screenwriter
- Years active: 1946-1970s
- Spouse: Jeanne Moody

Conrad Scott Forbes (11 September 1920 – 25 February 1997), popularly known as Scott Forbes, was a British film and television actor and screenwriter. In his later career as a screenwriter, he was credited as C. Scott Forbes.

== Early years ==
Forbes was born in High Wycombe, Buckinghamshire. He attended Repton, and then studied Philosophy, Politics, and Economics at Balliol College, Oxford. He worked for the Ministry of Defence before settling on a performing career.

== Acting career ==
In the 1940s Forbes used the name Julian Dallas, appearing in Night Boat to Dublin (1946), Mrs. Fitzherbert (1947), But Not in Vain (1948), This Was a Woman (1948) and The Reluctant Widow (1950). He also appeared on the stage as Julian Dallas, spending a year with the Liverpool Old Vic, and in London under the direction of John Gielgud in The Cradle Song, among other plays.

Following his few British productions, he moved to the U.S. and quickly found film work. Consigned mainly to action roles in Warner Bros. films such as Rocky Mountain (1950) and Operation Pacific (1951), Forbes played more in-depth characters on TV. He was Maxim de Winter in "Rebecca" in a live performance for the Broadway Television Theatre in 1952. He played the Duke of Cornwall in Peter Brook's 1953 television adaptation of King Lear with Orson Welles as Lear. One of his best known roles was on "The Deep Six," which was a 1953 installment of NBC's Robert Montgomery Presents. In the 1955–56 season, he guest starred in NBC's western anthology series Frontier, hosted by Walter Coy, and in the summer of 1956 in an episode of the ABC series G.E. Summer Originals.

On Broadway, Forbes appeared in two plays with Cedric Hardwicke, one of them directed by Hardwicke. Horses in Midstream had only four performances in 1953, while The Burning Glass played a slightly more successful twenty-eight performances the following year.

In 1956, Forbes starred in the title role of ABC's The Adventures of Jim Bowie. This historically based series was an immediate hit with younger viewers, even though some adult reviewers criticised it for having too much violence. In preparation for the part Forbes trained with a former Miss Alabama, Jeanne Moody, to perfect a convincing Southern accent. He and Moody had married in 1954. The series rocketed Forbes to fame, but made it hard for him to find other parts. Forbes was a guest star in Black Saddle TV show, which aired on 21 March 1959, Season 1 Episode 10 titled "Client: Steele" as Bill Steele. On 3 December 1959 Forbes appeared as a homesteader, Cass Taggart, in the episode "Rebel Ranger" of CBS's Dick Powell's Zane Grey Theater. Joan Crawford is cast in this episode as Stella Faring, a Confederate widow from San Antonio, Texas, who tries to reclaim her former home and the birthplace of her son Rob (Don Grady), from the Unionist owner Taggart. Character actor John Anderson is cast as Fisk Madden, who tries to drive Taggart off his land and gain Stella's favor. The episode ends with Stella and Rob heading into a nearby town with the understanding that Taggart would call upon Stella for possible courtship though she was fifteen years his senior.

After Jim Bowie ended its two-year run in 1958, Forbes returned to Great Britain, where he became a frequent guest star in television dramas. In 1963, he played the lead in the world premiere of Harold Pinter's play "The Lover" on the London stage.

== Writing career ==
Pinter encouraged him to pursue his interest in writing, and in 1964 Forbes's own play, "The Meter Man", was produced. It was later made into the film called The Penthouse. Forbes remained active as a screenwriter and television actor into the 1970s. In his later years, he shunned public life, pursuing his interests in writing and classical music.

== Death ==
He died in 1997 in Swindon, Wiltshire, at the age of 76.

== Filmography ==
=== Actor ===
Year	Title	Role	Notes
1946	Night Boat to Dublin	Lieut. Allen	
1947	Mrs. Fitzherbert	Prince William	
1948	This Was a Woman	Dr. Valentine Christie	
1948	But Not in Vain	Willem Bakker	
1950	The Reluctant Widow	Francois Cheviot	
1950	Rocky Mountain	Lt. Rickey (USA)	
1951	Operation Pacific	Lt. Larry	
1951	Raton Pass	Prentice	
1951	Inside the Walls of Folsom Prison	Jim Frazier	
1951	The Highwayman	Sergeant	
1951	Rommel, Desert Fox	Commando Colonel	Uncredited
1952	What Price Glory	Lt. Bennett	Uncredited
1954	Charade	Capt. Stamm	
1961	Saint of Devil's Island	Jacques	
1968	Subterfuge	Pannell	
1970	The Mind of Mr. Soames	Richard Bannerman	
1990	Mirror, Mirror	Commercial Voiceover	Voice, (final film role)

=== Screenwriter ===
- Perfect Friday (1970)
