= Ray Teal =

American actor (1902–1976)

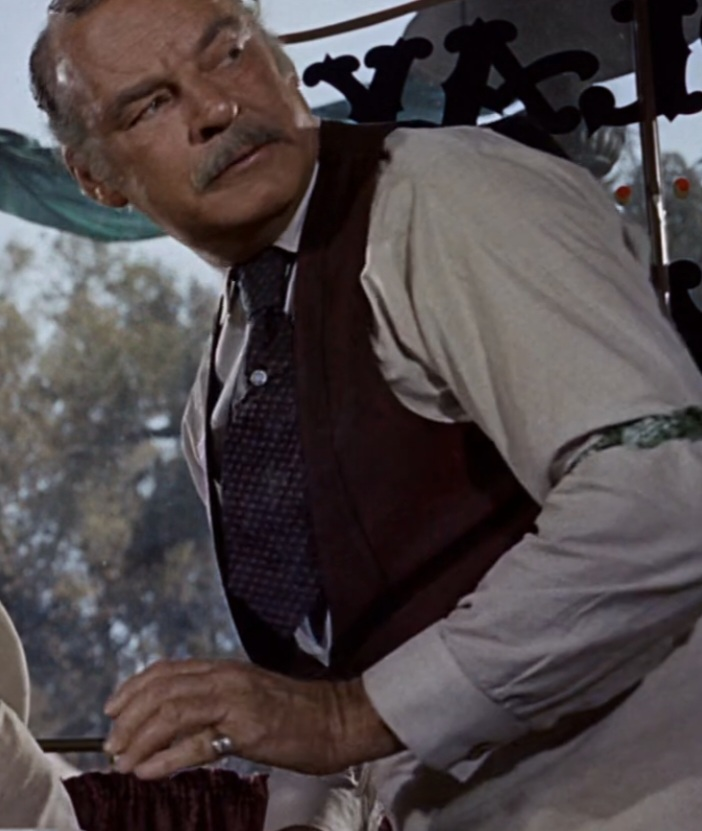
- Teal in One-Eyed Jacks (1961)
- Born: Ray Elgin Teal; January 12, 1902; Grand Rapids, Michigan, U.S.
- Died: April 2, 1976 (aged 74); Santa Monica, California, U.S.
- Other name: Ray E. Teal
- Education: University of California
- Occupation: Actor
- Years active: 1937–1974
- Spouse: Louise Laraway

Ray Elgin Teal (January 12, 1902 (Note: The book Celebrities in Los Angeles Cemeteries: A Directory gives Teal's birth date as January 12, 1908.) – April 2, 1976) was an American actor who appeared in more than 300 television shows and movies during his 40 year career. His most famous role was as Sheriff Roy Coffee on the television series Bonanza (1959–1972), which was only one of dozens of sheriffs on television and in movies that he played during his long and prolific career stretching from 1937 to 1970. He appeared in pictures such as Western Jamboree (1938) with Gene Autry, The Best Years of Our Lives (1946) with Fredric March and Myrna Loy, The Black Arrow (1948), Billy Wilder's Ace in the Hole (1951) and Judgment at Nuremberg (1961) with Spencer Tracy and Burt Lancaster.

== Early life ==
Teal was born in Grand Rapids, Michigan. A saxophone player, he worked his way through the University of California, Los Angeles as a bandleader before becoming an actor.

== Musical career ==
In the early 1930s Teal and his orchestra, the Floridians, played in southern cities in the United States, with full-house audiences in Atlanta, Chattanooga, Nashville, and other cities. The group had a 17-week stay at the Olympia Theater in Miami. Teal also was master of ceremonies at the Paramount Theatre in New York. By the mid-1930s he had expanded his show to include a "Music Hall Varieties" segment that featured comedian Ben Blue.

== Acting career ==
His longest-running role was as Sheriff Roy Coffee, a law-enforcing sheriff on Bonanza. Teal was one of the most senior members of the crew having a permanent role. He had also played a sheriff in the Billy Wilder film Ace in the Hole (1951). Teal co-starred in numerous TV westerns throughout his career: he appeared five times on Cheyenne, four times on The Lone Ranger, on The Alaskans, three times in different roles on another long-running western series, Wagon Train, on NBC's Tales of Wells Fargo, on the ABC western series Broken Arrow, five times on the ABC western comedy Maverick, on the CBS western series The Texan, the NBC western series The Californians, twice on Colt .45, once on Wanted: Dead or Alive, and as "Sheriff Clay" for a single 1960 episode of the NBC western series Riverboat, and four times on a western series about the rodeo titled Wide Country.

After more than 15 years performing in films and in early television, Teal secured a recurring role as a police officer in the 1953–1955 ABC sitcom with a variety-show theme, Where's Raymond?, later renamed The Ray Bolger Show.

In 1955, Teal appeared as McCanles, a ruthless cattle baron in the episode "Julesburg" of the ABC/Warner Bros. Western series, Cheyenne. Altogether, Teal appeared five times on Cheyenne. He later appeared in a guest-starring role in another ABC/WB Western series, The Alaskans. From 1957 to 1962, Teal was cast three times in different roles on the Western series, Wagon Train. He also appeared in a number of episodes of Bat Masterson, an episode of The Rifleman (S2 E6 "Eddie's Daughter" as Albie Finley in 1959) and later in Green Acres.

In 1957, Teal played a lawman, Captain McNelly, in the episode "Sam Bass" of NBC's Tales of Wells Fargo. Teal was cast as Fenster in "The Bounty Hunters" (1957) on the ABC Western series, Broken Arrow. In 1958, Teal guest-starred "No Tears for the Dead" on the CBS Western series, The Texan. He also later appeared in the CBS sitcom, Dennis the Menace.

On the Warner Bros. series Maverick starring James Garner and Jack Kelly, Teal played a crooked sheriff in the episode "The Day They Hanged Bret Maverick" (1958) and also starred as villains in the episodes "Stage West" (1957) based on a story by Louis L'amour and "Two Beggars on Horseback" (1958).

In 1960, Teal was cast as Sheriff Roy Coffee in Bonanza, a role he played until 1972, appearing in 98 episodes, occasionally as the lead character. He also portrayed judge/dentist/shoe repairman H.G. Cogswell in Bat Masterson starring Gene Barry.

Teal appeared twice in another ABC/WB Western, Colt .45, playing Mike O'Tara in the series finale, "The Trespassers" (1960). In 1960, he was cast as Sheriff Clay in the episode "Zigzag" of the NBC Western series Riverboat. In 1962, Teal portrayed Mr. Todd in the episode entitled "The Tall Shadow" of the NBC modern Western drama, Empire. That same year, he was cast as Sam Thorpe in the episode "Step Forward" of the NBC police drama 87th Precinct. He portrayed, in 1962, the character Alvin Greaves in "Unwanted: Dead or Alive" of the syndicated adventure series The Everglades. In 1962 and 1963, he was cast four times, three as the character Frank Higgins, on the Western series about the rodeo, Wide Country. In 1963, Teal appeared as murder victim Joe Downing in the CBS courtroom drama series Perry Mason episode, "The Case of the Shifty Shoebox".

Teal was a bit-part player in Western films for several years before landing a minor role in Northwest Passage (1940). Another of his roles was as Little John in The Bandit of Sherwood Forest (1946). Notable film roles include playing one of the judges in Judgment at Nuremberg (1961) with Spencer Tracy and an indulgent bar owner to Marlon Brando's motorcycle gang in The Wild One (1953). This was the second of three times that Teal appeared with Brando, having done so already as a drunk in Brando's debut in The Men (1950) and later in Brando's only directorial effort, One-Eyed Jacks (1961), as a bartender.

Teal appeared in three episodes of the 1955–1957 anthology series, Crossroads, a study of clergymen from different denominations.

== Death ==
He died of undisclosed causes on April 2, 1976, at age 74 in Santa Monica, California.

== Selected filmography ==
Year	Film	Role	Director	Notes
1937	Sweetheart of the Navy	Orchestra Leader		uncredited
1937	Radio Patrol	Perkins	Clifford Smith	Serial; uncredited
1937	Zorro Rides Again	Henchman [Chs. 2–3]	John English	Serial; uncredited
1938	Give Me a Sailor	Sailor Playing Clarinet	Elliott Nugent	uncredited
1938	Western Jamboree	McCall	Ralph Staub	
1939	Star Reporter	Crook	Howard Bretherton	uncredited
1940	Northwest Passage	Bradley McNeil		uncredited
1940	Strange Cargo	Guard	Frank Borzage	uncredited
1940	Viva Cisco Kid	Stage Holdup Man	Norman Foster	uncredited
1940	Florian	Soldier	John E. Burch (assistant)	uncredited
1940	New Moon	Bondsman	W. S. Van Dyke	uncredited
1940	Adventures of Red Ryder	Henchman Shark [Chs. 1as2]	John English	Serial
1940	I Love You Again	Watchman	W.S. Van Dyke	uncredited
1940	Prairie Schooners	Wolf Tanner	Sam Nelson	
1940	Cherokee Strip	Smokey Lovell	Lesley Selander	
1940	Third Finger, Left Hand	Cameraman in Ohio	Robert Z. Leonard	uncredited
1940	The Trail Blazers	Recognizes Emergency Code	George Sherman	uncredited
1940	Melody Ranch	Henchman	Joseph Santley	uncredited
1940	Pony Post	Claud Richards		
1940	Trail of the Vigilantes	Deputy Sheriff		uncredited
1940	The Green Hornet Strikes Again!	Chief Guard at Steel Mill	John Rawlins	Serial; uncredited
1940	Kitty Foyle	Clarinet Player	Sam Wood	uncredited
1941	Outlaws of the Panhandle	Walt Burnett		
1941	Ziegfeld Girl	Pawnbroker	Robert Z. Leonard	uncredited
1941	Billy the Kid	Sammy Axel	David Miller	uncredited
1941	They Met in Bombay	Private	Clarence Brown	uncredited
1941	Sergeant York	Marching Soldier	Howard Hawks	uncredited
1941	Honky Tonk	Poker Player on Train	Jack Conway	uncredited
1941	They Died with Their Boots On	Barfly	Raoul Walsh	uncredited
1941	Shadow of the Thin Man	Cab Driver	W. S. Van Dyke	uncredited
1941	Unholy Partners	Waiter	Mervyn LeRoy	uncredited
1942	Don Winslow of the Navy	Saboteur Radio Operator [Chs. 4–12]	Ray Taylor	Serial; uncredited
1942	The Bugle Sounds	Sergeant	S. Sylvan Simon	uncredited
1942	Nazi Agent	Officer Graves	Jules Dassin	uncredited
1942	Wild Bill Hickok Rides	Beadle	Ray Enright	Credits
1942	Woman of the Year	Married Sports Reporter	George Stevens	uncredited
1942	Captain Midnight	Borgman- Henchman #8	James W. Horne	Serial
1942	Fingers at the Window	Police Car #12 Driver	Charles Lederer	uncredited
1942	The Big Shot	Motorcycle Cop	Lewis Seiler	uncredited
1942	Calling Dr. Gillespie	Detroit Policeman	Harold S. Bucquet	uncredited
1942	Escape from Crime	Dude's Gang Member	D. Ross Lederman	uncredited
1942	Secret Enemies	Casey, the Motorcycle Cop	Benjamin Stoloff	uncredited
1942	Overland Mail	Phony Indian [Ch. 5]	John Rawlins	Serial; uncredited
1942	Apache Trail	Ed Cotton	Richard Rosson	with Lloyd Nolan and Donna Reed
1942	Northwest Rangers	Poker Player		uncredited
1942	Tennessee Johnson	Sergeant at Arms	William Dieterle	uncredited
1943	The Youngest Profession	Second Taxi Driver	Edward Buzzell	uncredited
1943	Prairie Chickens	Henchman Sam	Hal Roach, Jr.	uncredited
1943	Slightly Dangerous	Pedestrian Lifting Peggy Up	Buster Keaton	uncredited
1943	She Has What It Takes	Cop	Charles Barton	uncredited
1943	A Gentle Gangster	Joe Barton	Phil Rosen	
1943	Crime Doctor	Detective with Pipe	Michael Gordon	uncredited
1943	Thousands Cheer	Ringmaster at Circus	George Sidney	uncredited
1943	Dangerous Blondes	Detective Charlie Temple	Leigh Jason	uncredited
1943	The Chance of a Lifetime	Policeman Joe	William Castle	uncredited
1943	The North Star	German Soldier with Binoculars and Grenade	Lewis Milestone	uncredited
1943	The Heat's On	Stagehand	Gregory Ratoff	uncredited
1943	Madame Curie	Driver	Mervyn LeRoy	uncredited
1943	Lost Angel	Guard	Roy Rowland	uncredited
1943	Whistling in Brooklyn	Traded Beaver Baseball Player	S. Sylvan Simon	uncredited
1944	None Shall Escape	Oremski	Andre de Toth	
1944	Song of Russia	Motorcycle Rider	Gregory Ratoff; László Benedek (uncredited)	uncredited
1944	See Here, Private Hargrove	Public Relations Officer	Wesley Ruggles	uncredited
1944	Once Upon a Time	Shipyard Worker	Alexander Hall	uncredited
1944	Bathing Beauty	Adams Club Maitre d' at	George Sidney	uncredited
1944	Raiders of Ghost City	Joe Burke	Ray Taylor	uncredited
1944	U-Boat Prisoner	C.P.O. Shaw		uncredited
1944	Wing and a Prayer	Executive Officer	Henry Hathaway	uncredited
1944	Secret Command	Shipyard Worker	A. Edward Sutherland (as Eddie Sutherland)	uncredited
1944	Maisie Goes to Reno	Policeman	Harry Beaumont	uncredited
1944	Cry of the Werewolf	Policeman Ed	Henry Levin	uncredited
1944	The Soul of a Monster	Truck Driver		uncredited
1944	Strange Affair	Henchman	Alfred E. Green	uncredited
1944	An American Romance	Mine Personnel Clerk	King Vidor	uncredited
1944	The Missing Juror	Chief of Detectives at Line-Up	Budd Boetticher(as Oscar Boetticher Jr.)	uncredited
1944	The Princess and the Pirate	Guard	David Butler	uncredited
1944	The Thin Man Goes Home	Second Man Outside Barber Shop	Richard Thorpe	uncredited
1944	Nothing But Trouble	Police Officer	Sam Taylor	uncredited
1944	Hollywood Canteen	Army Captain	Delmer Daves	uncredited
1944	Gentle Annie	Expressman on Train	Andrew Marton	uncredited
1945	Main Street After Dark	Cop at Finale	Edward L. Cahn	uncredited
1945	Keep Your Powder Dry	Camouflage Leader	Edward Buzzell	uncredited
1945	The Clock	Police Officer Standing Next to Mounted Policeman	Vincente Minnelli	uncredited
1945	Sudan	Slave Trader	John Rawlins	uncredited
1945	Circumstantial Evidence	Policeman	John Larkin	
1945	Diamond Horseshoe	Tough Customer at Footlight Club	George Seaton	uncredited
1945	Back to Bataan	Lieutenant Colonel Roberts	Edward Dmytryk	uncredited
1945	Wonder Man	Opera Ticket Taker	H. Bruce Humberstone	uncredited
1945	Along Came Jones	Kriendler	Stuart Heisler	with Gary Cooper and Loretta Young
1945	Anchors Aweigh	Assistant Movie Director	George Sidney	uncredited
1945	Ziegfeld Follies	2nd Subway Policeman ('Limehouse Blues')	George Sidney	uncredited
1945	Shady Lady	Andy	George Waggner	uncredited
1945	Don't Fence Me In	State Investigator	John English	uncredited
1945	Snafu	American Legionnaire		uncredited
1945	Captain Kidd	Michael O'Shawn	Rowland V. Lee	uncredited
1945	Adventure	Maritime Commissioner	Victor Fleming	uncredited
1946	The Fighting Guardsman	Albert	Henry Levin	uncredited
1946	The Harvey Girls	Conductor	Robert Alton	uncredited
1946	A Letter for Evie	Cab Driver	Jules Dassin	uncredited
1946	The Bandit of Sherwood Forest	Little John	George Sherman	
1946	Blonde Alibi	Detective Jones	Will Jason	uncredited
1946	The Runaround	Jeremiah P. Cagan	Charles Lamont	uncredited
1946	Dangerous Business	Plainclothesman	D. Ross Lederman	uncredited
1946	Deadline for Murder	Frank	James Tinling	uncredited
1946	Strange Voyage	Captain Andrews	Irving Allen	
1946	The Missing Lady	Neal Howison	Phil Karlson	uncredited
1946	Decoy	Policeman at Roadblock	Jack Bernhard	uncredited
1946	Three Wise Fools	Foreman	Edward Buzzell	uncredited
1946	The Strange Woman	Duncan	Edgar G. Ulmer	uncredited
1946	Lady Luck	Sign Painter	Edwin L. Marin; James Anderson (assistant)	uncredited
1946	The Best Years of Our Lives	Mr. Mollett	William Wyler	
1946	Till the Clouds Roll By	Movie Studio Orchestra Conductor	Richard Whorf	uncredited
1947	Dead Reckoning	Motorcycle Cop		uncredited
1947	The Michigan Kid	Sergeant	Ray Taylor	
1947	Ramrod	Ed Burma	Andre de Toth	
1947	The Sea of Grass	Cattleman	Elia Kazan	uncredited
1947	Undercover Maisie	Wolf at Union Station	Harry Beaumont	uncredited
1947	Pursued	Army Captain	Raoul Walsh	scenes deleted
1947	My Favorite Brunette	State Trooper Sergeant	Elliott Nugent	uncredited
1947	The Long Night	Mr. Hudson	Anatole Litvak	uncredited
1947	Cheyenne	Gambler	Raoul Walsh	uncredited
1947	Northwest Outpost	Wounded Trapper	Allan Dwan	uncredited
1947	Brute Force	Guard	Jules Dassin	uncredited
1947	Desert Fury	Bus Driver	Lewis Allen	uncredited
1947	Deep Valley	Prison Official	Jean Negulesco	uncredited
1947	Driftwood	Clem Perkins	Allan Dwan	
1947	Unconquered	Soldier in the Gilded Beaver	Cecil B. DeMille	uncredited
1947	Louisiana			
1947	The Fabulous Texan	State Police Captain	Edward Ludwig	uncredited
1947	Roses Are Red	Weston	James Tinling	uncredited
1947	High Wall	Police Lieutenant	Curtis Bernhardt	uncredited
1947	Road to Rio	Buck	Norman McLeod	uncredited
1947	Killer McCoy	Welsh's Bodyguard	Roy Rowland	uncredited
1948	The Swordsman	Driver	Joseph H. Lewis	uncredited
1948	Black Bart	Pete	George Sherman	uncredited
1948	Tenth Avenue Angel	Mounted Train Yard Guard	Roy Rowland	uncredited
1948	The Mating of Millie	Mike	Henry Levin	uncredited
1948	The Miracle of the Bells	Koslick, a Miner	Irving Pichel	uncredited
1948	The Black Arrow	Nick Appleyard		
1948	Fury at Furnace Creek	Sergeant	H. Bruce Humberstone	uncredited
1948	Raw Deal	Police Commanding Officer	Anthony Mann	uncredited
1948	I Wouldn't Be in Your Shoes	Guard #1	William Nigh	
1948	Hazard	Plainclothesman	George Marshall	uncredited
1948	Daredevils of the Clouds	Jim Mitchell	George Blair	
1948	The Man from Colorado	Bartender	Henry Levin	uncredited
1948	Walk a Crooked Mile	Police Sergeant	Gordon Douglas	uncredited
1948	Black Eagle	George	Robert Gordon	uncredited
1948	The Snake Pit	Doctor	Anatole Litvak	uncredited
1948	Road House	Bus Depot (uncredited)	Jean Negulesco	with Ida Lupino and Richard Widmark)
1948	Joan of Arc	Bertrand de Poulengy	Victor Fleming	a squire
1948	The Countess of Monte Cristo	Charlie	Fred de Cordova; Andrew L. Stone (uncredited)	
1948	An Act of Murder	Dr. McDermott	Michael Gordon	uncredited
1948	Whispering Smith	Seagrue	Leslie Fenton	
1948	One Sunday Afternoon	Cop on Bike	Raoul Walsh	uncredited
1949	Bad Boy	Police Officer	Kurt Neumann	uncredited
1949	Streets of Laredo	Henchman Cantrel	Leslie Fenton	
1949	It Happens Every Spring	Policeman	Lloyd Bacon	uncredited
1949	Kazan	McCready	Will Jason	
1949	The Great Gatsby	Cop at Accident Scene	Elliott Nugent	uncredited
1949	Mr. Soft Touch	Squad Car Police Officer	Henry Levin	uncredited
1949	Scene of the Crime	Patrolman	Roy Rowland	uncredited
1949	Blondie Hits the Jackpot	Gus	Edward Bernds	uncredited
1949	Once More, My Darling	Truck Driver	Robert Montgomery	
1949	Rusty's Birthday	Virgil Neeley	Seymour Friedman	
1949	Oh, You Beautiful Doll	Policeman	John M. Stahl	uncredited
1949	Samson and Delilah	Tax Collector	Cecil B. DeMille	uncredited
1950	Davy Crockett, Indian Scout	Captain McHale	Lew Landers	
1950	Ambush	Captain J.R. Wolverson	Sam Wood	
1950	Gun Crazy	California Border Inspector	Joseph H. Lewis	uncredited
1950	The Kid from Texas	Sheriff Rand	Kurt Neumann	
1950	Quicksand	Motorcycle Officer	Irving Pichel	
1950	Harbor of Missing Men	Frank Leggett	R. G. Springsteen	
1950	Winchester '73	Marshall Noonan	Anthony Mann	uncredited
1950	The Asphalt Jungle	Cop in Car Barn Slugged by Dix	John Huston	uncredited
1950	Where Danger Lives	Sheriff Joe Borden	John Farrow	uncredited
1950	The Men	Man at Bar	Fred Zinnemann	
1950	Our Very Own	Mr. Jim Lynch	David Miller	
1950	Edge of Doom	Ned Moore	Mark Robson	
1950	No Way Out	Day Deputy in Hospital Prison Ward	Joseph L. Mankiewicz	uncredited
1950	The Petty Girl	Policeman #1	Henry Levin	uncredited
1950	When You're Smiling	Steve	Joseph Santley	
1950	Convicted	Cell Block / Yard Guard	Henry Levin	uncredited
1950	Southside 1-1000	Bunco Agent	Boris Ingster	
1951	The Great Missouri Raid	Union Sergeant	Gordon Douglas	uncredited
1951	Oh! Susanna	Corporal at Gate	Joseph Kane	uncredited
1951	The Redhead and the Cowboy	Brock	Leslie Fenton	
1951	Along the Great Divide	Deputy Lou Gray	Raoul Walsh	
1951	Home Town Story	Complaining Electrical Worker	Arthur Pierson	uncredited
1951	Lorna Doone	Farmer Ridd	Phil Karlson	uncredited
1951	Ace in the Hole	Sheriff Gus Kretzer	Billy Wilder	
1951	Fort Worth	Gabe Clevenger	Edwin L. Marin	
1951	The Secret of Convict Lake	Sheriff Cromwell	Michael Gordon	uncredited
1951	Tomorrow Is Another Day	Henry Dawson	Felix E. Feist	
1951	Distant Drums	Private Mohair	Raoul Walsh	
1952	The Wild North	Ruger	Andrew Marton	
1952	Flaming Feather	Coconino County Sheriff	Ray Enright	uncredited
1952	The Captive City	Chief Gillette	Robert Wise	
1952	The Lion and the Horse	Dave Tracy	Louis King	
1952	Jumping Jacks	Brigadier General W.W. Timmons	Norman Taurog	with Dean Martin and Jerry Lewis
1952	Carrie	Bondsman	William Wyler	
1952	Cattle Town	Judd Hastings	Noel M. Smith	
1952	Montana Belle	Emmett Dalton	Allan Dwan	
1952	The Turning Point	Clint, Police Captain	William Dieterle	
1952	Hangman's Knot	Quincey	Roy Huggins	
1953	Ambush at Tomahawk Gap	Doc	Fred F. Sears	
1953	The Wild One	Frank Bleeker	László Benedek	
1954	The Command	Dr. Trent	David Butler	
1954	Lucky Me	Thayer Crony	Jack Donohue	uncredited
1954	About Mrs. Leslie	Barney	Daniel Mann	
1954	Rogue Cop	Patrolman Mullins	Roy Rowland	
1955	Rage at Dawn	Sheriff of Seymour	Tim Whelan	with Randolph Scott and Mala Powers
1955	The Man from Bitter Ridge	Shep Bascom	Jack Arnold	
1955	Run for Cover	Sheriff	Nicholas Ray	
1955	Apache Ambush	Sergeant Tim O'Roarke	Fred F. Sears	
1955	The Desperate Hours	State Police Lieutenant Fredericks	William Wyler	with Humphrey Bogart and Fredric March
1956	The Indian Fighter	Morgan	Andre de Toth	with Kirk Douglas and Walter Matthau
1956	Canyon River	Mr. Reed	Harmon Jones	uncredited
1956	The Burning Hills	Joe Sutton	Stuart Heisler	
1956	The Young Guns	Josh	Albert Band	uncredited
1957	Utah Blaine	Russ Nevers	Fred F. Sears	
1957	The Big Caper	Real Estate Broker	Robert Stevens	uncredited
1957	The Phantom Stagecoach	Sheriff Ned Riorden	Ray Nazarro	
1957	The Guns of Fort Petticoat	Salt Pork	George Marshall	with Audie Murphy and Kathryn Grant Crosby
1957	The Oklahoman	Jason Stableman	Francis D. Lyon	with Joel McCrea
1957	Band of Angels	Mr. Calloway	Raoul Walsh	with Clark Gable and Sidney Poitier
1957	The Wayward Girl	Sheriff	Lesley Selander	
1957	Decision at Sundown	Morley Chase	Budd Boetticher	with Randolph Scott
1957	The Tall Stranger	Cap	Thomas Carr	
1958	Saddle the Wind	Brick Larson	Robert Parrish	
1958	Gunman's Walk	Jensen Sieverts	Phil Karlson	
1958	Girl on the Run	Lieutenant Harper		
1960	Home from the Hill	Dr. Reuben Carson	Vincente Minnelli	
1960	Inherit the Wind	Jessie H. Dunlap	Stanley Kramer	with Spencer Tracy and Fredric March
1961	Posse from Hell	Banker	Herbert Coleman	
1961	The Absent-Minded Professor	Man in Street Interviewee	Robert Stevenson	uncredited
1961	One-Eyed Jacks	Barney	Marlon Brando	
1961	Ada	Sheriff Kearney Smith	Daniel Mann	uncredited
1961	Judgment at Nuremberg	Judge Curtiss Ives	Stanley Kramer	with Spencer Tracy
1962	A Girl Named Tamiko	Kyle Munce	John Sturges	
1963	Cattle King	Ed Winters	Tay Garnett	
1964	Bullet for a Badman	Sweeper	R.G. Springsteen	
1964	Taggart	Ralph Taggart	R. G. Springsteen	
1970	The Liberation of L.B. Jones	Chief of Police	William Wyler	
1970	Chisum	Justice J.B. Wilson	Andrew V. McLaglen	
1971	Hacksaw	The Rancher	Larry Lansburgh	

== Television ==
Year	Title	Role	Notes
1953-1955	Where's Raymond	Mike the cop	Season 1 Episode 12: "Christmas"
1955-1962	Cheyenne	Sheriff	5 Episodes
1955	Alfred Hitchcock Presents	Police Lieutenant	Season 1 Episode 1: "Revenge"
1955	The Lone Ranger	Doc Grayson	Season 4 Episode 45: "Adventure at Arbuckle"
1956	Alfred Hitchcock Presents	Warden Jacobs	Season 1 Episode 16: "You Got to Have Luck"
1956	Alfred Hitchcock Presents	Police Detective Sergeant	Season 1 Episode 32: "The Baby Sitter"
1956-1967	Lassie	Walt Johnson, Jim Teal, Dan Peterson	13 Episodes
1957	Alfred Hitchcock Presents	Sheriff Briggs	Season 2 Episode 17: "My Brother, Richard"
1957	Alfred Hitchcock Presents	Chief of Detectives	Season 2 Episode 21: "Number Twenty-Two"
1958	The Restless Gun	Sheriff	Season 1 Episode 19: "Hang and be Damned"
1958	The Restless Gun	Sheriff Landers	Season 1 Episode 26: "The Hand is Quicker"
1959	Alfred Hitchcock Presents	Fire Chief	Season 4 Episode 17: "Total Loss"
1959	Alfred Hitchcock Presents	Ben Tulip	Season 5 Episode 11: "Road Hog"
1960-1972	Bonanza	Sheriff Roy Coffee	99 Episodes - recurring character
1960-1979	The Magical World of Disney	Sheriff Snead	16 Episodes - recurring character
1961	Alfred Hitchcock Presents	Jim Hale	Season 7 Episode 12: "A Jury of Her Peers"
1961	Rawhide	Hennegan	Season 4 Episode 4: "Judgment at Hondo Seco"
1963	Rawhide	Sheriff	Season 6 Episode 9: "Incident of the Prophecy"
1963	The Twilight Zone	Mr. Franklin	Season 4 Episode 9: "Printer's Devil"
1974	Hanged Man	Judge Homer Bayne	TV movie
