= No My Darling Daughter =

- Directed by: Ralph Thomas
- Written by: Frank Harvey
- Based on: play Handful of Tansy by Kay Bannerman; Harold Brooke
- Produced by: Betty E. Box
- Starring: Michael Redgrave; Michael Craig; Roger Livesey; James Westmoreland; Juliet Mills
- Cinematography: Ernest Steward
- Edited by: Alfred Roome
- Music by: Norrie Paramor
- Production company: Rank Organisation Film Productions
- Distributed by: J. Arthur Rank Film Distributors (UK); Zenith (UK)
- Release dates: 10 August 1961 (London); 27 March 1964 (US)
- Running time: 97 minutes
- Country: United Kingdom
- Language: English

No My Darling Daughter is a 1961 British comedy film directed by Ralph Thomas and starring Michael Redgrave, Michael Craig, Roger Livesey, James Westmoreland, and Juliet Mills. It was written by Frank Harvey based on the play Handful of Tansy by Kay Bannerman and Harold Brooke.

== Plot ==
Wealthy businessman and single parent Sir Michael Carr does not know how to deal with his daughter Tansy as she reaches adolescence. His close friend and employee ex-General Henry Barclay has the same kind of problem with his son. Thomas Barclay left the military and has now tendered his resignation from Carr's automobile company.

Tansy chances to meet American Cornelius Allingham at her father's office. The two teens soon become inseparable friends; she shows him around London, with her father blithely unaware of the relationship. When Carr has to go on a business trip to New York, he sends Tansy along with General Barclay on his fishing vacation in Scotland. She secretly arranges for Cornelius to meet her there. The two see the sights on his motor scooter and eventually go camping together (he sleeps outside the tent), without informing anyone. When Carr realises his daughter is missing, he finds some photographs of Cornelius, assumes the worst, and gets the police to initiate a nationwide manhunt.

Thomas, who had earlier resented having to get Tansy out of her various scrapes, uses his army training and tracks the pair down. He sneaks up, knocks Cornelius out, and takes a resisting Tansy back to London.

When Cornelius wakes up, he discovers he is wanted by the police. He turns himself in to Carr, then reveals that he is the millionaire son of Carr's business associate and that he holds a sizable number of shares in Carr's own company. Relieved that his daughter had not been seduced by a fortune hunter, Carr gives his blessing to their marriage. However, Thomas discovers that he is in love with Tansy; when he kisses her, she realizes she feels the same about him and they elope. General Barclay is furious at first, having gone to great lengths to arrange the wedding, until Carr reminds him that this was what they had hoped for.

== Cast ==
- Michael Redgrave as Sir Michael Carr
- Michael Craig as Thomas Barclay
- Roger Livesey as General Henry Barclay
- James Westmoreland as Cornelius Allingham (credited as Rad Fulton)
- Juliet Mills as Tansy Carr
- Renée Houston as Miss Yardley, Carr's secretary
- Joan Sims as second typist
- Peter Barkworth as Charles
- David Lodge as Flanigan
- Ian Fleming as vicar
- Victor Brooks as policeman
- Carole Shelley as first typist
- Court Benson as Allingham
- Terry Scott as constable
- Nyree Dawn Porter as third typist
- Tom Gill as Sir Matthew's dresser
- John Blythe as first reporter
- Derek Aylward as second reporter
- Jean Taylor Smith as headmistress

== Production ==
Filming started 13 March 1961.

It was Michael Craig's fourth film with Box and Thomas and he said it "wasn't really bad" with Juliet Mills being "very good indeed" and Redgrave and Livesey giving "the proceedings a touch of class." He also enjoyed filming at Loch Lomond.

The movie featured a duet between Mills and Redgrave that played over the opening credits.

== Release ==
The film opened on 10 August 1961 at the Odeon Leicester Square in London's West End.

== Reception ==
Variety wrote "following Juliet Mills’ successful stage appearances, in “Five Finger Exercise,” both in the West End and on Broadway her screen debut has been awaited with more than average interest. Would she be able to keep up the screen tradition of father John Mills and her younger sister, Hayley Mills? Answer appears to be “Yes,” though she has a fairly stereotyped role in a not outstanding pic. This, at best, is an unpretentious, amiable comedy. At worst it has to thrash around too energetically for the yocks."

The Monthly Film Bulletin wrote: "It is painful to see how unfunny even a good cast can be when given a script so lacking in wit and so full of jokes and characters familiar from decades of matinées. Slippery mats, lift doors shutting too fast, and Lido programmes brought back from a business journey to Paris are only too typical of the level of comic invention. A skin-deep semblance of contemporary sophistication is the main contribution of Ralph Thomas's pedestrian direction. The youngsters, Rad Fulton and the lively Juliet Mills, maintain some dignity, but their love is too innocent to be credible and the general atmosphere so insistently clean-limbed as to be faintly unwholesome."

Kinematograph Weekly called it a "stylish and wholesome romantic comedy."
