= Private Hell 36 =

1954 film by Don Siegel

- Theatrical release poster
- Directed by: Don Siegel
- Screenplay by: Collier Young; Ida Lupino
- Produced by: Collier Young
- Starring: Ida Lupino; Steve Cochran; Howard Duff; Dean Jagger; Dorothy Malone
- Cinematography: Burnett Guffey
- Edited by: Stanford Tischler
- Music by: Leith Stevens
- Production company: The Filmakers
- Distributed by: Filmakers Releasing Organization
- Release date: September 3, 1954
- Running time: 81 minutes
- Country: United States
- Language: English

Private Hell 36 is a 1954 American crime film noir directed by Don Siegel, and starring Ida Lupino, Steve Cochran, Howard Duff, Dean Jagger and Dorothy Malone.

The picture was one of the last feature-length efforts by Filmakers, an independent company created by producer Collier Young and Ida Lupino.

== Plot ==
Los Angeles police detectives Cal Bruner and Jack Farnham meet a nightclub singer, Lilli Marlowe, who may hold the key to solving a major New York robbery. Lilli assists the detectives in the search for a suspect she has encountered, and a romance develops between her and Cal. When the suspect is finally spotted, a chase ensues that results in the death of the fugitive. Inside the suspect's car there is a box filled with money, and Cal pockets $80,000 of it. Jack wants nothing to do with this and reminds his partner that the money is marked. Cal has a plan, however, and Jack finds himself drawn into it. He reluctantly accepts a key to a trailer in which Cal has hidden the money, the idea being that Jack can access his share, but Jack - a family man who just wants as normal a life as possible - is increasingly agitated and racked with guilt. Cal receives a call from the dead man's partner threatening to reveal the cop's deceit unless he gets his money back. Jack insists that they turn in the money and take what is coming to them, but Cal says he intends to murder the blackmailer and claim self-defence. After a time, Cal agrees to return the money, but he is actually preparing to kill his own partner. When the crook suddenly shows up, Cal wounds Jack, then Cal is killed by a shot from the dark. Their boss, Captain Michaels, appears and reveals what really happened: he suspected the detectives had taken the money, and the blackmailing crook was just a ruse.

== Cast ==
- Ida Lupino as Lilli Marlowe
- Steve Cochran as Cal Bruner
- Howard Duff as Jack Farnham
- Dean Jagger as Capt. Michaels
- Dorothy Malone as Francey Farnham
- King Donovan as Evney Serovitch
- Dabbs Greer as Sam Marvin
- William Boyett as Stimson
- Tom Monroe as Patrolman Tom
- Richard Deacon as Mr. Mace
- James Anderson as Patrolman in Locker Room
- Bridget Duff as Bridget Farnham
- Kenneth Patterson as Detective Lt. Lubin
- Chester Conklin as Murdered Man

== Background ==
The extensive racetrack scenes in the film were shot at Hollywood Park Racetrack in Inglewood, California, featuring the leads rather than body doubles. The interiors of real bars and shops were used so that the actors could walk out into actual streets within the same scene.

The film starts with a pre-credit sequence in an early modernist foreshadowing of the action teaser before it became commonplace on television series of the sixties. Typical of The Film[m]akers' productions, the last title card misspells “Made in Holl[y]wood, USA.“

The film is notable as one of the early Siegel B movies on which future auteur Sam Peckinpah, credited under his first name, David, learned his craft as a dialogue director.

== Reception ==
Film critic Bosley Crowther wrote a tepid review: "...attention is sharply divided between the main theme and the incidental character that Miss Lupino plays. This is somewhat understandable, since Miss Lupino happens to be one of the partners in Filmakers and a coauthor of the script. But let's not worry about it. No deplorable damage is done. There's not very much here to damage. Just an average melodrama about cops."

== Theme ==
Private Hell 36 showcases a number of Siegel’s thematic concerns, among them the crisis that occurs when “original assumptions [or] convictions are turned against a protagonist.” Film critic Judith M. Kass wrote:

Siegel demonstrates that love is not a refuge for man or woman, even for the couple (Howard Duff and Dorothy Malone) whose marriage is threatened by Duff’s anxiety and subsequent drinking. For Siegel, love apparently complicates rather than ameliorates the existential loneliness of his characters, creating for them additional hurdles in their already turbulent emotional lives and forming, rather than eroding, barriers to feeling and closeness.

== Sources ==
- Kass, Judith M. (1975). Don Seigel: The Hollywood Professionals, Volume 4 (1975 ed.). New York: Tanvity Press. p. 207. ISBN 0-498-01665-X.
