= The Girl on the Late, Late Show =

- Genre: Drama; Thriller
- Written by: Mark Rodgers
- Directed by: Gary Nelson
- Starring: Don Murray
- Music by: Richard Markowitz
- Country of origin: United States
- Original language: English

Production
- Executive producer: David Gerber
- Producer: Christopher Morgan
- Production locations: The Burbank Studios, Burbank, California; Los Angeles; San Francisco
- Cinematography: Robert L. Morrison
- Editor: Richard C. Meyer
- Running time: 73 min.
- Production companies: Screen Gems; David Gerber Productions

Original release
- Network: NBC
- Release: April 1, 1974

The Girl on the Late, Late Show is a 1974 American TV film directed by Gary Nelson. It was designed as a pilot of a weekly TV series starring Don Murray.

== Plot ==
A man tries to track down an old screen star.

== Cast ==
- Don Murray as William Martin
- Bert Convy as F J Allen
- Yvonne De Carlo as Lorraine
- Gloria Grahame as Carolyn Parker
- Van Johnson as Johnny Leverett
- Ralph Meeker as Inspector Debiesse
- Cameron Mitchell as Norman Wilder
- Mary Ann Mobley as Librarian
- Joe Santos as Sergeant Scott
- Laraine Stephens as Paula
- John Ireland as Bruno Walters
- Walter Pidgeon as John Pahlman
- Sherry Jackson as Pat Clauson
- Felice Orlandi as Detective
