= The Adventures of Jim Bowie =

American Western television series (1956–1958)

- Genre: Western; Adventure
- Starring: Scott Forbes
- Theme music composer: Ken Darby
- Opening theme: "Jim Bowie" by The King's Men
- Country of origin: United States
- No. of seasons: 2
- No. of episodes: 76

Production
- Executive producer: Louis F. Edelman
- Producers: William H. Wright; Lewis R. Foster
- Editor: John Woodcock
- Running time: 25 minutes
- Production companies: Desilu Productions; Jim Bowie Enterprises

Original release
- Network: ABC
- Release: September 7, 1956 – August 29, 1958

The Adventures of Jim Bowie is an American Western television series that aired on ABC from 1956 to 1958. Its setting was the 1830s-era Louisiana Territory. The series was an adaptation of the book Tempered Blade, by Monte Barrett.

== Synopsis ==
The series stars Scott Forbes as the real-life adventurer Jim Bowie. The series initially portrayed Jim Bowie as something of an outdoors-man, riding his horse through the wilderness near his home in Opelousas, where he would stumble across someone needing his assistance. He was aided by the Bowie Knife, his ever-present weapon. He designed it in the first episode, The Birth of the Blade. Although Bowie used the blade quite a bit in early episodes, its prominence was downplayed as the show went on.

Gradually the series shifted from the country to the city, having Bowie instead spend the majority of his time in New Orleans. He was frequently shown looking to invest his money in real estate or coming to the aid of someone who had been swindled.

Storylines focused on the exploits of Bowie before he moved to Texas (then part of Mexico), and his death at the Alamo in 1836. During the series's two season run, Bowie encountered many historical figures of the era, such as President Andrew Jackson, Jefferson Davis, John James Audubon, Sam Houston, and Davy Crockett.

== Production ==
Among the actors and actresses who guest-starred more than once on the series were William Schallert, Denver Pyle, Michael Landon, Chuck Connors, Walter Coy, June Carter Cash, and Lurene Tuttle. Jimmy Noel made walk-on appearances in six episodes. Those making single guest appearances included Yvonne Lime Fedderson, Douglas Kennedy, and Carole Mathews.

Jim Bowie did not appear in the last episode of the series. Instead, he was said to be away on an important assignment, and the attention was placed on criminal Jess Miller. Miller was given the task to retrieve a great sum of money, and the episode focused on whether Miller would complete his assignment or take the money for himself. At the end there is an indication that Miller would join up with Bowie on further adventures, but no further episodes were produced.

Douglas Brode wrote in his book, Shooting Stars of the Small Screen: Encyclopedia of TV Western Actors, 1946–Present, that Scott Forbes, who had the title role, "stormed off the set" when he learned that the series was being canceled after two seasons, when he had understood that it would run for five seasons. He added, "In desperation, the writers fashioned the final script" without the star.

The program was sponsored by Chesebrough-Ponds.

== Reception ==
Use of the knife in the initial episode led a reviewer for The New York Times to write, "[I]t would seem like a wise idea for parents to keep young viewers away from the television set when the show is on." The show was one of the first TV programs criticized for on-screen violence.

== Episodes ==
=== Season 1 (1956–57) ===
No. overall	No. in season	Title	Directed by	Written by	Original release date
1	1	"The Birth of the Blade"	Unknown	Unknown	September 7, 1956
2	2	"The Squatter"	Unknown	Unknown	September 14, 1956
3	3	"An Adventure with Audubon"	Unknown	Unknown	September 21, 1956
4	4	"Deputy Sheriff"	Lewis R.Foster	Unknown	September 28, 1956
5	5	"Trapline"	Lewis R.Foster	Nat Tanchuck	October 5, 1956
6	6	"Broomstick Wedding"	Unknown	Unknown	October 12, 1956
7	7	"Natchez Trace"	Unknown	October 19, 1956	
8	8	"Jim Bowie Comes Home"	Lewis R.Foster	Lewis R.Foster	October 26, 1956
9	9	"The Ghost of Jean Battoo"	Unknown	Unknown	November 2, 1956
10	10	"The Secessionist"	Unknown	Unknown	November 9, 1956
11	11	"Land Jumpers"	Unknown	Unknown	November 16, 1956
12	12	"The Select Females"	Unknown	Unknown	November 23, 1956
13	13	"Bowie and His Slave"	Unknown	Unknown	November 30, 1956
14	14	"Outlaw Kingdom"	Unknown	Unknown	December 7, 1956
15	15	"The Swordsman"	Unknown	Unknown	December 14, 1956
16	16	"The Return of the Alcibiade"	Unknown	Unknown	December 21, 1956
17	17	"Monsieur Francois"	Lewis R.Foster	Robert Warnes Leach	December 28, 1956
18	18	"A Horse for Old Hickory"	Unknown	Unknown	January 4, 1957
19	19	"The Beggar of New Orleans"	Unknown	Unknown	January 11, 1957
20	20	"Osceola"	Unknown	Unknown	January 18, 1957
21	21	"Master of Arms"	Unknown	Unknown	January 25, 1957
22	22	"Convoy Gold"	Unknown	Unknown	February 1, 1957
23	23	"Spanish Intrigue"	Unknown	Unknown	February 8, 1957
24	24	"Bayou Tontine"	Unknown	Unknown	February 15, 1957
25	25	"German George"	Unknown	Unknown	February 22, 1957
26	26	"An Eye for an Eye"	Unknown	Unknown	March 1, 1957
27	27	"The Captain's Chimp"	Unknown	Unknown	March 8, 1957
28	28	"Jackson Assassination"	Unknown	Unknown	March 15, 1957
29	29	"Rezin Bowie, Gambler"	Unknown	Unknown	March 22, 1957
30	30	"Thieves' Market"	Unknown	Unknown	March 29, 1957
31	31	"The Pearl and the Crown"	Unknown	Unknown	April 5, 1957
32	32	"The General's Disgrace"	Unknown	Unknown	April 12, 1957
33	33	"The Lottery"	Unknown	Unknown	April 19, 1957
34	34	"The Intruder"	Unknown	Unknown	April 26, 1957
35	35	"Country Cousin"	Unknown	Unknown	May 3, 1957
36	36	"The Bound Girl"	Unknown	Unknown	May 10, 1957
37	37	"Bounty Hunter"	Unknown	Unknown	May 17, 1957
38	38	"Gone to Texas"	Unknown	Unknown	May 24, 1957

=== Season 2 (1957–58) ===
No. overall	No. in season	Title	Directed by	Written by	Original release date
39	1	"Epitaph for an Indian"	Unknown	Unknown	September 6, 1957
40	2	"Flowers for McDonough"	Unknown	Unknown	September 13, 1957
41	3	"The Irishman"	Unknown	Unknown	September 20, 1957
42	4	"Counterfeit Dixie"	Unknown	Unknown	September 27, 1957
43	5	"Bullet Metal"	Unknown	Unknown	October 4, 1957
44	6	"Quarantine"	Unknown	Unknown	October 11, 1957
45	7	"A Fortune for Madame"	Unknown	Unknown	October 18, 1957
46	8	"House Divided"	Unknown	Unknown	October 25, 1957
47	9	"The Whip"	Unknown	Unknown	November 1, 1957
48	10	"Pearls of Talimeco"	Unknown	Unknown	November 8, 1957
49	11	"Charivari"	Unknown	Unknown	November 15, 1957
50	12	"Hare and Tortoise"	Unknown	Unknown	November 22, 1957
51	13	"The Bridegroom"	Unknown	Unknown	November 29, 1957
52	14	"The Alligator"	Unknown	Unknown	December 6, 1957
53	15	"Country Girl"	Unknown	Unknown	December 13, 1957
54	16	"Mexican Adventure"	Unknown	Unknown	December 20, 1957
55	17	"Silk Purse"	Unknown	Unknown	December 27, 1957
56	18	"Choctaw Honor"	Unknown	Unknown	January 3, 1958
57	19	"Close Shave"	Unknown	Unknown	January 10, 1958
58	20	"Pirate on Horseback"	Unknown	Unknown	January 17, 1958
59	21	"Curfew Cannon"	Unknown	Unknown	January 24, 1958
60	22	"Home Sweet Home"	Unknown	Unknown	January 31, 1958
61	23	"Deaf Smith"	Unknown	Unknown	February 7, 1958
62	24	"Ursula"	Unknown	Unknown	February 14, 1958
63	25	"Apache Silver"	Unknown	Unknown	February 21, 1958
64	26	"A Grave for Jim Bowie"	Unknown	Unknown	February 28, 1958
65	27	"Up the Creek"	Unknown	Unknown	March 7, 1958
66	28	"The Lion's Cub"	Unknown	Unknown	March 14, 1958
67	29	"Horse Thief"	Unknown	Unknown	March 21, 1958
68	30	"Jim Bowie, Apache"	Unknown	Unknown	March 28, 1958
69	31	"The Brothers"	Unknown	Unknown	April 4, 1958
70	32	"Patron of the Arts"	Unknown	Unknown	April 11, 1958
71	33	"Bad Medicine"	Unknown	Unknown	April 18, 1958
72	34	"A Night in Tennessee"	Unknown	Unknown	April 25, 1958
73	35	"Bowie's Baby"	Unknown	Unknown	May 2, 1958
74	36	"The Cave"	Unknown	Unknown	May 9, 1958
75	37	"Man of the Streets"	Unknown	Unknown	May 16, 1958
76	38	"The Puma"	Unknown	Unknown	May 23, 1958

== Theme Music ==
The theme song was "Adventurin' Man", performed by the Ken Darby Singers. The series' music was unusual in that it was primarily vocal, provided by Ken Darby and The King's Men (save for a few episodes in season two).

== Recurring cast members ==
- Scott Forbes - Jim Bowie (75 episodes)
- Peter Hansen - Rezin Bowie (17 episodes)
- Minerva Urecal - Ma Bowie (6 episodes)
- William Schallert - Justinian Tebbs (8 episodes)
- Denver Pyle - Sam Houston (3 episodes)
- Ewing Mitchell - Preacher Homer Wilkins (2 episodes)

== Home media ==
A two-DVD set containing 13 episodes of the program has been published.

== Merchandising ==
The TV show was also adapted into a comic book by Dan Spiegle, distributed by Dell Comics.
