= Of Love and Desire =

1963 film by Richard Rush

- Theatrical poster
- Directed by: Richard Rush
- Screenplay by: László Görög; Richard Rush
- Story by: Victor Stoloff; Jacquine Delessert
- Produced by: Victor Stoloff
- Starring: Merle Oberon; Steve Cochran; Curt Jürgens; John Agar; Steve Brodie
- Cinematography: Alex Phillips
- Edited by: Harry W. Gerstad
- Music by: Ronald Stein
- Production company: New World Film Corporation
- Distributed by: Twentieth Century Fox Film Corporation
- Release date: September 11, 1963
- Running time: 94 minutes
- Country: United States
- Languages: English; Spanish

Of Love and Desire is a 1963 film directed by Richard Rush and starring Merle Oberon, Steve Cochran and Curd Jürgens.

== Plot ==
American engineer Steve Corey moves to Mexico to work at one of the mining projects owned by Katherine Beckman and her half-brother Paul. He finally is introduced to Katherine, and the man that he is taking over for, Bill Maxton, informs him that Katherine is his for the taking: "All you have to do is touch her—she goes off like fireworks. There were plenty of guys before me, and there'll be plenty after me."

Steve thinks that Katherine is what he expected but ends up developing a crush on her. As their relationship develops, Paul gets upset and reintroduces her ex-boyfriend Gus Cole to her to lure her away from Steve. Half-siblings Katherine and Paul are carrying some emotional damage from the past which they need to work out.

== Cast ==
Actor	Role
Merle Oberon	Katherine Beckmann
Steve Cochran	Steve Corey
Curd Jürgens	Paul Beckmann
John Agar	Gus Cole
Steve Brodie	Bill Maxton
Jan Murray	Pete Madsen
Stanley Adams	Mac Lunsford
Eduardo Noriega	Señor Domínguez
Rebeca Iturbide	Mrs. Renard
Elsa Cárdenas	Señora Domínguez

== Critical reception ==
From online reviewer website Cool Cinema Trash:

Of Love and Desire is an old-fashioned soap opera with a morality firmly entrenched in the 1950s. Sex before marriage is bad. End of story. The resulting guilt and shame this causes for the film's heroine is what makes Of Love and Desire such a melodramatic treat for fans of cool cinema trash.

== Soundtrack ==
All tracks are written by Ronald Stein.

Side one
No.	Title	Length
1.	"Katherine's Love Theme: Sang by Sammy Davis Jr."	2:10
2.	"Of Love and Desire Theme"	2:16
3.	"The Garden"	2:49
4.	"Acapulco"	2:00
5.	"The Pool"	2:29
6.	"The Terrace"	2:49
7.	"Market Chase"	1:40
8.	"The Acapulco Hilton Mariachi Samba Twist"	2:35

Side two
No.	Title	Length
9.	"Romantic Idyl"	2:15
10.	"Mexico City"	1:03
11.	"First Trio"	2:11
12.	"Vocal Llorona and Walk Home"	2:22
13.	"Rape Scene"	2:20
14.	"Second Run"	1:58
15.	"A Brother's Kiss"	2:46
16.	"Katherine's Theme Denouement"	3:14
