= Tomorrow Is Another Day (1951 American film) =

1951 film by Felix E. Feist

- Theatrical release poster
- Directed by: Felix E. Feist
- Screenplay by: Art Cohn; Guy Endore
- Story by: Guy Endore
- Produced by: Henry Blanke
- Starring: Ruth Roman; Steve Cochran; Lurene Tuttle
- Cinematography: Robert Burks
- Edited by: Alan Crosland Jr.
- Music by: Daniele Amfitheatrof
- Production company: Warner Bros. Pictures
- Distributed by: Warner Bros. Pictures
- Release dates: August 8, 1951 (New York); October 12, 1951 (Los Angeles)
- Running time: 90 minutes
- Country: United States
- Language: English

Tomorrow Is Another Day is a 1951 American film noir directed by Felix E. Feist and starring Ruth Roman and Steve Cochran.

== Plot ==
Convicted of murdering his abusive father at age 13, Bill Clark is freed after 18 years behind bars. On his release, Bill meets Dan Monroe, who seems to be friendly, but is angered when he discovers that Monroe is a reporter exploiting Bill for a sensational story about the released "boy killer." Now wary of people and not accustomed to women, Bill is attracted to taxi dancer Cathy "Cay" Higgins, who initially rejects his advances. After he gives her a watch and they tour the city together, she invites him to her apartment, where they are confronted by George Conover, Cathy's estranged boyfriend, who orders Bill to leave and brandishes a gun. Bill attacks Conover and wrests control of the gun but is knocked unconscious. Cathy retrieves the gun, shooting Conover when he moves toward her. Conover staggers out of the apartment and hails a cab. When Bill awakens, he finds Cathy packing to leave.

Cathy informs Bill that Conover is a New York police detective and urges him to go away, believing that the Conover would not want the publicity involved in pressing charges. She tells him that she is going to hide at her brother's home in New Jersey. Later, Bill discovers that Conover has been hospitalized and that his assailant is being sought. Terrified that he may be caught, he finds Cathy at her brother's home.

When she realizes that Bill has no memory of what happened, Cathy leads him to believe that he had shot Conover just before fainting. After hearing a radio report on Conover's death, they flee together. Cathy's brother allows them to borrow his car to cross the state line. At a diner, they abandon the car and hide in an auto mounted on a car carrier. Initially at odds with each other, they begin to warm and Bill persuades Cathy to marry him under assumed names.

They continue to hitchhike, learning more about each other and growing closer. In California, they meet Henry and Stella Dawson and their son, who are heading toward the lettuce fields of Salinas. Bill and Cathy are persuaded to join them, and they find honest work and happiness, making a comfortable home of their modest cottage.

Henry sees Bill's picture in a true-crime magazine that has advertised a $1,000 reward for information about him. Henry is eager to collect the reward, but he relents when Stella insists that it would not be right. However, Bill becomes suspicious about what Henry knows and might do, and declines to join him fishing the next day. He is tempted to flee, but Cathy announces that she is pregnant.

That next day, Henry is badly injured in a car accident and Stella gives into temptation for the reward money. When Bill sees a police officer walking from the Dawsons' cabin to his, he prepares to attack him with a sickle. In an attempt to stop him, Cathy confesses that it was she who had shot Conover. Bill refuses to believe it and proceeds as planned. As the policeman approaches, Cathy stops Bill by shooting him in the shoulder.

In custody and back in New York, Bill and Cathy each confess separately to killing Conover in order to spare the other. The district attorney informs them that Conover had confessed before dying that he had been shot in self-defense and that the police had never been looking for either of them. They are finally free to resume their life together.

== Cast ==
- Ruth Roman as Cathy "Cay" Higgins
- Steve Cochran as William "Bill" Clark
- Lurene Tuttle as Stella Dawson
- Ray Teal as Henry Dawson
- Morris Ankrum as Hugh Wagner
- John Kellogg as Dan Monroe
- Lee Patrick as Janet Higgins
- Hugh Sanders as George Conover
- Stuart Randall as Frank Higgins
- Robert Hyatt as Johnny Dawson
- Harry Antrim as Warden
- Walter Sande as Sheriff

== Reception ==
In a contemporary review, critic Edwin Schallert of the Los Angeles Times wrote:

They have done a creditable job in manufacturing suspense, even though the idea they actually start with is difficult to appraise, and does not seem in all respects to ring true. If you can accept it and the way they present it you will rate "Tomorrow Is Another Day" okay. But this reviewer feels a certain quavery undercurrent. which is not surprising, in the earlier part of the picture. One ls inclined to ask: Would things really be that way for a man obtaining his freedom under these peculiar circumstances? ... Altogether it is a muddied sort of plot. While happiness prevails at the end for the two, the final fade-out bas a murky background that just barely avoids the issue of dark crime. Primarily a melodrama, "Tomorrow Is Another Day" has therefore controversial points, which will lay it open to discussion and argument. As entertainment it may not completely satisfy, apart from its rather strong suspense. Depiction of the policeman and a newsaperman's tactics are not particularly acceptable.

Critic A. H. Weiler of The New York Times wrote: "Apart from one sequence when the pair hide in a car being transported by truck to effect their escape, 'Tomorrow Is Another Day' follows an ancient formula. Its tensions are manufactured and apparent. List 'Tomorrow Is Another Day' as just another picture."

A review in the Chicago Tribune observed: "The film opens rather well, but goes rapidly downhill, despite the fact that both of its principals are capable. The script is sleazy and the net results are routine."

The film earned $1.7 million at the box office.

== Legacy ==
Film noir historian Eddie Muller ranked the film as #20 of his 25 noir films that will stand the test of time.
