= Operation Secret =

1952 American war drama film by Lewis Seiler

- Theatrical release poster
- Directed by: Lewis Seiler
- Written by: Harold Medford; James R. Webb
- Produced by: Henry Blanke
- Starring: Cornel Wilde; Steve Cochran; Phyllis Thaxter; Karl Malden; Paul Picerni; Lester Matthews
- Cinematography: Ted D. McCord
- Edited by: Clarence Kolster
- Music by: Roy Webb
- Production company: Warner Bros. Pictures
- Distributed by: Warner Bros. Pictures
- Release date: November 8, 1952
- Running time: 108 minutes
- Country: United States
- Language: English

Operation Secret is a 1952 American war drama film directed by Lewis Seiler and written by Harold Medford and James R. Webb. The film stars: Cornel Wilde, Steve Cochran, Phyllis Thaxter, Karl Malden, Paul Picerni and Lester Matthews. The film was released by Warner Bros. Pictures on November 8, 1952. The film is based on the exploits of US Marine Corps Major Peter Ortiz.

== Plot ==
The story is told through testimonial flashbacks at a military tribunal held in Paris after the end of World War II. Its purpose is to investigate and uncover the identity of a traitor reputed to have fed information to German Occupation forces. In its efforts to find the truth, four witnesses are called to testify: (a) Peter Forrester, an American, ostensibly OSS, who served with the French Resistance movement; (b) Maria Corbett, a Resistance member who posed as a Catholic nun; (c) Marcel Brevoort, a Resistance leader who served with Forrester before and after France's fall; and (d) Major Latrec, the most zealous anti-Nazi in the group, demonstrably loyal to the Underground's cause. Testimonial recall of their unit's activity during the war builds to a surprising revelation.

== Cast ==
- Cornel Wilde as Peter Forrester
- Steve Cochran as Marcel Brevoort
- Phyllis Thaxter as Maria Corbet
- Karl Malden as Maj. Latrec
- Paul Picerni as Capt. Armand Dupree
- Lester Matthews as Robbins
- Dan O'Herlihy as Mike Duncan
- Jay Novello as Herr Bauer
- Wilton Graff as French Official
- Dan Riss as German Sergeant
- Harlan Warde as Maj. Dawson
- Kenneth Patterson as General
- William F. Leicester as Capt. Hughes
- Gayle Kellogg as Corporal

== Critical reception ==
New York Times critic Bosley Crowther said the film "spins its story vigorously but with little impact. This dissipation of potential tension may be attributed to the fact that the self-effacing bravery displayed here has been in evidence on film before, and with greater effect." Crowther said that even though it was based on fact, "this annal of dedicated men braving dangerous assignments appears to be largely hackneyed deeds out of an old and not too thrilling history."

A New York Daily News critic observed that earlier films about the underground in Europe had presented all the fighters as "heroes and patriots." but that "now, apparently, it can be told that some of the leaders of resistance movements were fighting first for Russia and only incidentally for their native lands." She praised Wilde for an "effective performance."
