= Raton Pass (film) =

1951 film by Edwin L. Marin

- Theatrical release poster
- Directed by: Edwin L. Marin
- Screenplay by: Thomas W. Blackburn; James R. Webb
- Based on: Raton Pass; 1950 novel by Thomas W. Blackburn
- Produced by: Saul Elkins
- Starring: Dennis Morgan; Patricia Neal; Steve Cochran
- Cinematography: Wilfred M. Cline
- Edited by: Thomas Reilly
- Music by: Max Steiner
- Production company: Warner Bros. Pictures
- Distributed by: Warner Bros. Pictures
- Release date: April 19, 1951 (New York)
- Running time: 84 minutes
- Country: United States
- Language: English
- Box office: $1.3 million

Raton Pass is a 1951 American Western film directed by Edwin L. Marin and starring Dennis Morgan, Patricia Neal and Steve Cochran.

== Plot ==
In 1880 in New Mexico Territory, Pierre Challon and son Marc own a large ranch that encompasses both sides of Raton Pass. They lease additional acres from homesteaders to accommodate their cattle, but it is an uneasy arrangement, leading to occasional feuding. Against this background, two strangers arrive: an attractive woman, Ann, and a ruthless gunfighter, Cy Van Cleave, with whom she flirts. After making lunch plans with Cy, she observes an altercation between Cy and Marc, who emerges as the victor. She snubs Van Cleave for Marc, who is quickly enchanted by her charms. They marry and are pleasantly surprised by Pierre's wedding gift, a title deed transferring ownership of the ranch to them.

As a half-owner, Ann wants a voice in the ranch's operation, but no one seems to take her seriously. She becomes dissatisfied, bored and sullen until Prentice, a Chicago banker, arrives. Ann sees an opportunity to manipulate Prentice and further her plans. When Marc and his father embark on a business trip, Ann and Prentice are free to engage in a large but risky land-irrigation venture and begin a torrid love affair. When the Challons return, they are stunned to catch Ann and Prentice in a romantic moment, and they are planning to swindle Marc. Pierre urges Marc to shoot Ann in vengeance. To his father's dismay, Marc sells his 50% share to Ann. He is confident that her irrigation deal will backfire and leave her broke, allowing Marc to repurchase the land for pennies on the dollar.

Lena Casamajor, a homesteader's niece who loves Marc, fears that Ann will despoil the landscape for both ranchers and farmers. She arranges a meeting between Marc and the homesteaders. Marc offers them a deal to finance irrigation for all parties if they agree to help him deny Ann access to the grazing acreage that Marc leases from the homesteaders. Ann hires Van Cleave as a ranch foreman to instigate a range war. Soon, bullets fly from all directions and Van Cleave shoots Marc in the back, but miraculously, Marc survives. Disgusted with the bloodshed, Prentice abandons Ann. Van Cleave kills Ann before the Challons are able to stop him.

== Cast ==
- Dennis Morgan as Marc Challon
- Patricia Neal as Ann Challon
- Steve Cochran as Cy Van Cleave
- Scott Forbes as Prentice
- Dorothy Hart as Lena Casamajor
- Basil Ruysdael as Pierre Challon
- Louis Jean Heydt as Jim Pozner (as Louis J. Heydt)
- Roland Winters as Sheriff Périgord
- James Burke as Hank
- Elvira Curci as Tia

== Reception ==
In a contemporary review for The New York Times, critic Thomas M. Pryor wrote: "The moral of 'Raton Pass' ... would appear to be that cheating doesn't pay. The producers might have told the lesson a lot more interestingly than they have, but it comes off in tolerable fashion on the whole. ... With a little more dramatic punch, 'Raton Pass' could have amounted to something."
