= Harry Antrim =

American actor (1884–1967)

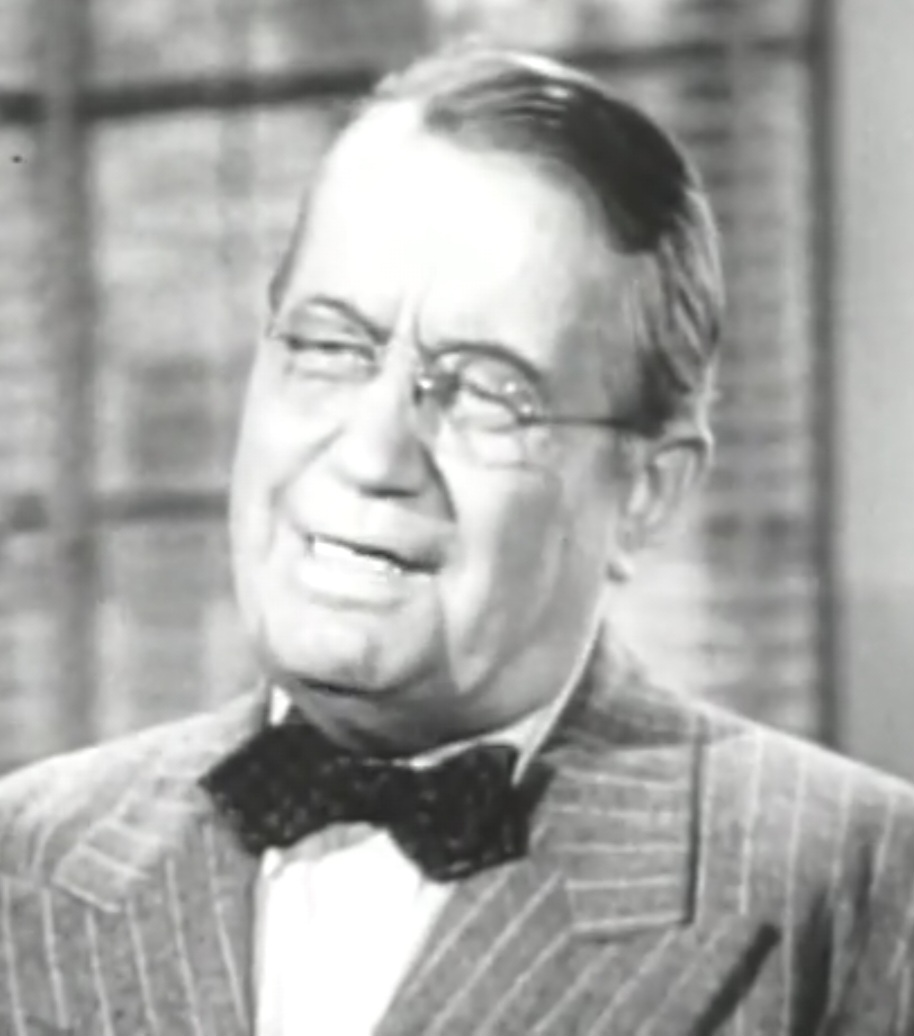
- Antrim in an episode of The Public Defender (1954)
- Born: August 27, 1884; Chicago, Illinois, U.S.
- Died: January 18, 1967 (aged 82); Los Angeles, California, U.S.
- Resting place: Valhalla Memorial Park Cemetery
- Occupation: Actor
- Years active: 1936–1967

Harry Antrim (August 27, 1884 – January 18, 1967) was an American stage, film and television actor.

== Biography ==
Antrim was born on August 27, 1884, in Chicago, Illinois. By 1906, he was working in vaudeville. During the early 1930s, he moved to Los Angeles and secured largely uncredited parts in several films, beginning with 1936's Small Town Girl. As his career progressed, he landed roles in Miracle on 34th Street (1947), Larceny (1948) and The Luck of the Irish (1948). In Miracle on 34th Street, he played an ahistorical R.H. Macy in an uncredited role, owner of Macy's Department Store. Other notable appearances in his film career include Ma and Pa Kettle (1949), The Heiress (1949), Intruder in the Dust (1950), the Barbara Stanwyck-led No Man of Her Own (1950), Tomorrow is Another Day (1951), I'll See You in My Dreams (1951) and The Bounty Hunter (1954). The Solid Gold Cadillac (1956) Antrim's last film was The Monkey's Uncle (1965).

His television appearances include an episode of I Love Lucy as a shopkeeper, Fred Walker, owner of Walker's drug store in The Andy Griffith Show, Dennis the Menace and Green Acres among others.

== Death ==
Antrim died of a heart attack on January 18, 1967, in Los Angeles, California.

He was buried at Valhalla Memorial Park Cemetery in North Hollywood, Los Angeles, California.

== Partial filmography ==
=== Film ===
Year	Title	Role	Notes
1936	Small Town Girl	Interne Holding X-Rays	Uncredited
1936	The President's Mystery	Inspector A.R. Lahey	
1947	Miracle on 34th Street	R.H. Macy	
1948	The Luck of the Irish	Senator Ransom	Uncredited
1948	Larceny	Mr. McNulty	Uncredited
1948	Let's Live a Little	James Montgomery	
1948	Words and Music	Dr. Rogers	
1948	Act of Violence	Fred Finney	
1949	Ma and Pa Kettle	Mayor Dwiggins	
1949	The Heiress	Mr. Abeel	
1949	Intruder in the Dust	Mr. Tubbs	
1950	No Man of Her Own	Ty Winthrop	
1951	Tomorrow Is Another Day	Prison Warden	
1951	I'll See You in My Dreams	Mr. LeBoy	
1952	Mutiny	Caleb Parsons	Uncredited
1954	The Bounty Hunter	Dr. R.L. Spencer	
1958	Teacher's Pet	Lloyd Crowley	
1959	Gunmen from Laredo	Judge Frank Parker	Uncredited
1964	For Those Who Think Young	Harry, 45th Anniversary Husband	Uncredited
1965	The Monkey's Uncle	Regent	

=== Television ===
Year	Title	Role	Notes
1955	The Jack Benny Program	Malcolm	Episode: "Jack Takes the Beavers to the Fair"
1955	Father Knows Best	Dr. Conrad	2 episodes
1955	I Love Lucy	Mr. Feldman	Episode: "Ricky's European Booking"
1955	The Great Gildersleeve	Judge Hooker	Six episodes
1960-1961	The Andy Griffith Show	Fred Walker	2 episodes
1963	Dennis the Menace	Judge Harvey Kingston	Episode: "Dennis Goes to Washington"
1963	The Alfred Hitchcock Hour	Councilman	Season 2 Episode 3: "Terror at Northfield"
1967	Green Acres	Doc Wilson	The Beverly Hillbillies
