= Steve Cochran =

American actor (1917–1965)

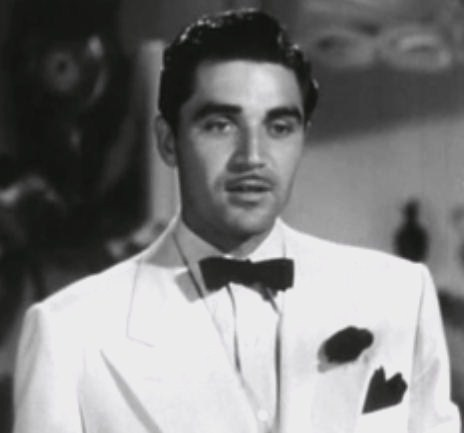
- Cochran in The Chase (1946)
- Born: Robert Alexander Cochran; May 25, 1917; Eureka, California, U.S.
- Died: June 15, 1965 (aged 48); Off the coast of Guatemala
- Education: University of Wyoming
- Occupation: Actor
- Years active: 1944–1965
- Spouses: Florence Lockwood (m. 1935; div. 1946) Fay McKenzie (m. 1946; div. 1948) Jonna Jensen (m. 1961)
- Children: 1
- Relatives: Alex Johns (grandson)

Steve Cochran (born Robert Alexander Cochran, May 25, 1917 – June 15, 1965) was an American film, television and stage actor. After a stint working as a cowboy, Cochran developed his acting skills in local theatre and gradually progressed to Broadway, film and television.

== Early life and career ==
Cochran was born in Eureka, California.

After stints as a cowpuncher and railroad station hand, he studied at the University of Wyoming, where he also played basketball. On an impulse, he quit college in 1937 and went straight to Hollywood in hopes of becoming a star.

=== Theatre ===
Cochran was rejected for military service in World War II because of a heart murmur, but he directed and performed in plays at various Army camps.

He was appearing with Constance Bennett in a touring production of Without Love in December 1943 when he was signed by Sam Goldwyn.

On Broadway, Cochran appeared in Hickory Stick (1944).

== Hollywood ==
=== Sam Goldwyn ===
Samuel Goldwyn brought Cochran to Hollywood in 1945. Goldwyn made only a few films a year, so he loaned Cochran to Columbia Pictures for Booked on Suspicion (1945), a Boston Blackie movie.

Goldwyn then cast him in Wonder Man (1945), a Danny Kaye movie co-starring Virginia Mayo and Vera-Ellen in which Cochran played a gangster. Columbia then used him in another Boston Blackie film, Blackie's Rendezvous (1945), in which he played a villain, and in The Gay Senorita (1945) with Jinx Falkenburg.

Goldwyn then used Cochran in another Danny Kaye movie with Mayo and Vera-Ellen, The Kid from Brooklyn (1946). After United Artists borrowed him to play a gangster in The Chase (1946), Cochran appeared in the prestigious drama The Best Years of Our Lives (1946), playing a man who has an affair with a woman (played by Virginia Mayo) that continues even after her husband (played by Dana Andrews) returns from war.

Cochran had a supporting role opposite Groucho Marx in Copacabana (1947) for United Artists. Goldwyn got him to play another gangster opposite Kaye and Mayo in A Song is Born (1948), directed by Howard Hawks.

He made his TV debut in "Dinner at Antoine's" for The Philco-Goodyear Television Playhouse (1949) and followed this with "Tin Can Skipper" for NBC Presents (1949).

He then returned to Broadway to support Mae West in a shortlived revival of her play Diamond Lil. This revived Hollywood's interest in him.

=== Warner Bros. ===
In 1949, Cochran went over to Warner Bros., playing Big Ed Somers, a power-hungry henchman to James Cagney's psychotic mobster in White Heat (1949) opposite Virginia Mayo. Warner Bros. eventually took over Cochran's and Mayo's contracts from Goldwyn.

Cochran supported Joan Crawford in The Damned Don't Cry (1950), after which he was given his first lead role, in Highway 301 (1950), playing a gangster. He was a villain to Gary Cooper's hero in Dallas (1950) and played a Ku Klux Klan member in Storm Warning (1951) with Ginger Rogers and Doris Day.

Cochran was a villain in Canyon Pass (1951), a western, and then was given the lead in Inside the Walls of Folsom Prison (1951), which inspired Johnny Cash to write his song "Folsom Prison Blues".

Warners gave him another lead in Tomorrow Is Another Day (1951), a film noir with Ruth Roman that was originally intended for Burt Lancaster.

He returned to supporting parts in Jim Thorpe – All-American (1951) with Burt Lancaster.

Warners starred him in The Tanks Are Coming (1951) and in a rare sympathetic role in The Lion and the Horse (1952). He co-starred with Cornel Wilde in Operation Secret (1952) and supported Virginia Mayo in She's Back on Broadway (1953). In The Desert Song (1953), Cochran played Gordon Macrae's rival for Kathryn Grayson. He then left Warners.

=== Post-Warners ===
Cochran starred in the low-budget action film Shark River (1953) for United Artists and was a villain in Back to God's Country (1953), which starred Rock Hudson, at Universal.

He returned to television, appearing in episodes of Lux Video Theatre ("Three Just Men" (1953)), and Studio One in Hollywood ("Letter of Love" (1953)). He reportedly made a film in Mexico called Embarcardero, which he wrote and directed. He also starred in it, alongside Edward Norri.

Cochran then went to Germany to make Carnival Story (1954) for the King Brothers. It was his first film in Europe.

Back in Hollywood, he co-starred in Private Hell 36 (1954) as a crooked cop with Ida Lupino and Howard Duff for Don Siegel. His TV roles included "Foreign Affair" (1954) for Robert Montgomery Presents; "The Role of a Lover" (1954) and "The Most Contagious Game" (1955) for Studio One; "Trip Around the Block" (1954) and "The Menace of Hasty Heights" (1956) for The Ford Television Theatre; "The After House" (1954), "Fear is the Hunter" (1956), and "Bait for the Tiger" (1957) for Climax!; and "The Seeds of Hate" (1955) for General Electric Theatre.

Republic Pictures hired him to play Ann Sheridan's love interest in Come Next Spring (1956) that he also produced. Cochran then went to the UK to play the lead in The Weapon (1956).

Cochran supported Van Johnson in MGM's Slander (1957). He went to Italy to star in Il Grido (1957) for Michelangelo Antonioni alongside Alida Valli and Betsy Blair; filming took seven months.

On television, he appeared in "Outlaw's Boots" (1957) for Schlitz Playhouse, "Debt of Gratitude" (1958) for Zane Grey Theater, "Strictly Personal" (1958) for The Loretta Young Show, and an episode of The Twilight Zone, “What You Need”, in 1959.

Cochran played the lead roles in Quantrill's Raiders (1958), an Allied Artists western, and in I Mobster (1959), a Roger Corman gangster film. Albert Zugsmith used him for the lead roles in The Beat Generation (1959) and The Big Operator (1959).

== Later career ==
After 1959, Cochran worked mostly in television, guest-starring in series such as Bonanza (Season 6, episode 26, "The Trap", aired on March 28, 1965, in which he played the murderous twin Shannon brothers), The Untouchables, Route 66, Bus Stop, Stoney Burke, The Naked City, Shirley Temple's Storybook, The Dick Powell Theatre, The Virginian, Death Valley Days, Mr. Broadway, and Burke's Law.

He had the lead in the TV movie The Renegade (1960) and was in Sam Peckinpah's debut feature, The Deadly Companions (1961). They had first worked together when Peckinpah was the dialogue director of the film noir Private Hell 36 (1954).

Cochran was Merle Oberon's co-star in Of Love and Desire (1963), shot in Mexico. He had the lead in Mozambique (1964) for Harry Alan Towers.

=== Producer ===
In 1953, Cochran formed his own production company, Robert Alexander Productions, which attempted to make some television series, and films such as The Tom Mix Story (with Cochran as Mix), Hope is the Last Thing to Die, about the Mexican War, and Klondike Lou. None of these was ever produced, but his company did make a television pilot, Fremont the Trailblazer, in which he played John C. Frémont and co-starred with Barbara Wilson and James Gavin. Cochran also wrote, produced, directed, and starred in Tell Me in the Sunlight (1965).

== Personal life ==
Cochran was a notorious womanizer and attracted tabloid attention for his tumultuous private life, which included well-documented affairs with numerous starlets and actresses. Mamie Van Doren later wrote about their sex life in graphic detail in her tell-all autobiography Playing the Field: My Story (New York: G.P. Putnam, 1987). He was also married and divorced three times to actresses Fay McKenzie, Florence Lockwood, and Jonna Jensen. He and Lockwood had one daughter, Xandra, through whom he was the grandfather of film and television producer Alex Johns, who was a co-executive producer for more than seventy episodes of the animated television series Futurama. In the 2002 documentary The Importance of Being Morrissey, Steven Morrissey claims that his parents named him after Steve Cochran.

In 1950, Cochran hired future screenwriter and actor Montgomery Pittman as a gardener at Cochran's Beverly Hills home.

Cochran was in trouble with the police several times in his life, including a reported assault and a charge of reckless driving in 1953.

== Death ==
Cochran recruited two “young women” and a 14-year-old girl to accompany him on a sailing trip from Acapulco to Costa Rica, ostensibly to take part in an upcoming film. The yacht lost one of its two masts in a storm a few days into the trip. Cochran fell ill and died two days later, on June 15, 1965, at the age of 48, of what was later determined to be an acute lung infection. The women who were accompanying him did not know how to sail the boat and were trapped with the decomposing body for ten days before being rescued out at sea. The boat, still carrying his corpse, was later found drifting off the coast of Guatemala.

Cochran's widow was given half of his estate of $25,000. She shared it with his daughter by another marriage. Cochran was buried in Monterey, California.

Cochran has a star at 1750 Hollywood Boulevard in the Motion Pictures section of the Hollywood Walk of Fame. It was dedicated on February 8, 1960.

== Filmography ==
Year	Title	Role	Notes
1945	Boston Blackie Booked on Suspicion	Jack Higgins	Alternative title: Booked on Suspicion
1945	Wonder Man	Ten Grand Jackson	
1945	Boston Blackie's Rendezvous	Jimmy Cook	Alternative title: Blackie's Rendezvous
1945	The Gay Senorita	Tomas Obrion aka Tim O'Brien	
1946	The Kid from Brooklyn	Speed McFarlane	
1946	The Chase	Eddie Roman	
1946	The Best Years of Our Lives	Cliff	Alternative titles: Glory for Me and Home Again
1947	Copacabana	Steve Hunt	
1948	A Song Is Born	Tony Crow	Alternative title: That's Life
1949	White Heat	Big Ed Somers	
1950	The Damned Don't Cry	Nick Prenta	
1950	Highway 301	George Legenza	
1950	Dallas	Bryant Marlow	
1951	Storm Warning	Hank Rice	
1951	Raton Pass	Cy Van Cleave	Alternative title: Canyon Pass
1951	Inside the Walls of Folsom Prison	Chuck Daniels	
1951	Tomorrow Is Another Day	Bill Clark / Mike Lewis	
1951	Jim Thorpe – All-American	Peter Allendine	Alternative title: Man of Bronze
1951	The Tanks Are Coming	Francis Aloysius 'Sully' Sullivan	
1952	The Lion and the Horse	Ben Kirby	
1952	Operation Secret	Marcel Brevoort	
1953	She's Back on Broadway	Rick Sommers	
1953	The Desert Song	Captain Claude Fontaine	
1953	Shark River	Dan Webley	
1953	Back to God's Country	Paul Blake	
1954	Carnival Story	Joe Hammond	
1954	Private Hell 36	Cal Bruner	
1956	Come Next Spring	Matt Ballot	
1956	The Weapon	Mark Andrews	
1957	Slander	H.R. Manley	
1957	Il Grido	Aldo	
1958	Quantrill's Raiders	Capt. Alan Wescott	
1959	I Mobster	Joe Sante	
1959	The Beat Generation	Dave Culloran	
1959	The Big Operator	Bill Gibson	Alternative title: Anatomy of the Syndicate
1959	The Twilight Zone	Fred Renard	Season 1 Episode 12 (“What You Need”)
1961	The Deadly Companions	Billy Keplinger	
1962	The Virginian (TV Series)	Jamie Dobbs	season 1 episode 10 ("West")
1963	Of Love and Desire	Steve Corey	
1965	Mozambique	Brad Webster	
1965	Bonanza (TV Series)	Burk Shannon	season 6 episode 26 ("The Trap")
1967	Tell Me in the Sunlight	Dave	Filmed in 1965; released posthumously (final film role)
