= Helmerich =

Helmerich is a German surname. Notable people with the surname include:

- Peggy V. Helmerich (born Peggy Dow, 1928), actress and philanthropist
  - Helmerich Award, annual literary prize, the Peggy V. Helmerich Distinguished Author Award
- T. J. Helmerich, American musician
- Walter Helmerich (1923–2012), American oil businessman, son of Walter, husband of Peggy
- Walter Helmerich II (1895–1981), American oil businessman
  - Helmerich & Payne, an American oil company, co-founded by Walter II

== See also ==
- Stefan Helmreich, American anthropologist
- William B. Helmreich (1945-2020), American sociologist
