= Angel Eyes (1946 song) =

Jazz standard song composed in 1946

"Angel Eyes" is a 1946 popular song composed by Matt Dennis, with lyrics by Earl K. Brent. It was introduced in the 1953 film Jennifer. In the film, Matt Dennis sings the song and accompanies himself on piano, while Ida Lupino and Howard Duff among others are dancing to it.

== Composition ==
"Angel Eyes" is a jazz standard which has inspired many interpretations. Singers who have recorded notable versions of the song include Nat King Cole (already in 1953), Frank Sinatra, June Christy with Stan Kenton, Chet Baker and Shirley Bassey. Ella Fitzgerald, who recorded "Angel Eyes" at least four times, named it her favorite song.
