= Reunion in Reno =

1951 film by Kurt Neumann

- Directed by: Kurt Neumann
- Written by: Lou Breslow; Hans Jacoby; William Sackheim; Brenda Weisberg; Shirley White
- Produced by: Leonard Goldstein
- Starring: Mark Stevens; Peggy Dow; Gigi Perreau
- Cinematography: Maury Gertsman
- Edited by: Virgil W. Vogel
- Music by: Joseph Gershenson
- Production company: Universal Pictures
- Distributed by: Universal Pictures
- Release dates: October 6, 1951 (Reno, Nevada); October 19, 1951 (Los Angeles)
- Running time: 79 minutes
- Country: United States
- Language: English

Reunion in Reno is a 1951 American comedy film directed by Kurt Neumann and starring Mark Stevens, Peggy Dow and Gigi Perreau. The screenplay concerns a girl who hires an attorney to obtain a divorce from her parents. The film's sets were designed by the art directors Bernard Herzbrun and Nathan Juran.

== Plot ==
Nine-year-old girl Maggie Linaker arrives in Reno, Nevada to find divorce lawyer Norman Drake, who is berated by stenographer Laura Carson for profiting from divorce rather than helping couples reconcile. Maggie explains that she would like to divorce her parents and offers Norman all of her money, $3.27. Norman and Laura are unable to persuade Maggie to disclose her parents' names or location. Norman finds Maggie's parents, Frederick Linaker and his pregnant wife Doris, who are shocked by what their daughter has done. Maggie was supposed to be on a bus trip to a Nevada summer camp.

At a mock trial in a judge's court, Maggie explains that she overheard her parents say that they cannot afford to raise two children. Doris reassures her that it was merely a worry, not a reason to leave. The Linakers return home and Norman and Laura think about marriage.

== Cast ==
- Mark Stevens as Norman Drake
- Peggy Dow as Laura Carson
- Gigi Perreau as Margaret "Maggie" Angeline Linaker
- Frances Dee as Mrs. Doris Linaker
- Leif Erickson as B. Frederick Linaker
- Ray Collins as Judge Thomas Kneeland
- Fay Baker as Miss Pearson
- Myrna Dell as Mrs. Virginia Mason
- Dick Wessel as Taxi Driver
- Sid Tomack as Serge Field
- Stuart Morgan Dancers as Dancing Ensemble

== Release ==
The film's world premiere was held in Reno, Nevada on October 6, 1951, with the stars of the film in attendance. Jeff Chandler acted as master of ceremonies for the stage show before the screening. Other celebrities attending the premiere included Rock Hudson and Susan Cabot.

== Reception ==
In a contemporary review for the Los Angeles Times, critic John L. Scott wrote: "This film story, wholesome and unpretentious, ... features a blend of light comedy and pathos and spotlights a talented 9-year-old child with winning ways, Gigi Perreau. The movie is the little girl's from beginning to end. ... Little Miss Perreau is an appealing child star and her performance avoids, for the most part, the 'cute' tricks usually associated with screen tots."

== Bibliography ==
- Quinlan, David. The Film Lover's Companion: An A to Z Guide to 2,000 Stars and the Movies They Made. Carol Publishing Group, 1997.
