= Helmerich Award =

The Peggy V. Helmerich Distinguished Author Award is an American literary prize awarded by the Tulsa Library Trust in Tulsa, Oklahoma. It is awarded annually to an "internationally acclaimed" author who has "written a distinguished body of work and made a major contribution to the field of literature and letters".

== History of the award ==
First given in 1985, with a cash prize of $5,000, by 2006 the prize had increased to $40,000 cash and an engraved crystal book. To date, all of the recipients have been English-language writers.

The award is named after Peggy V. Helmerich, a prominent Tulsa library activist, philanthropist and the wife of Tulsa oilman Walter Helmerich III. Before her marriage, as Peggy Dow, she had been an actress, best known for the role of Nurse Kelly in the 1950 James Stewart film, Harvey and for co-starring with Best Actor Oscar nominee Arthur Kennedy in 1951's Bright Victory.

The first honoree was writer and longtime Saturday Review of Literature editor Norman Cousins, with the evening's theme announced as "The Salutary Aspects of Laughter". In 1997, distinguished African-American historian John Hope Franklin became the first (and so far only) native Oklahoman to receive the award. While in Tulsa to accept the award, Franklin made several appearances to speak about his childhood experiences with racial segregation as well as his father's experiences as a lawyer in the aftermath of the 1921 Tulsa race massacre.

In 2004, 88-year-old Arthur Miller was initially announced as the honoree, but subsequently declined the award when illness prevented him from attending the December award ceremony and dinner; he died two months later. David McCullough, the 1995 winner, replaced him as featured speaker at the dinner and, later, returned his honorarium to the library.

The following year's initial choice to be the honoree was again unable to accept due to illness: Oklahoman Tony Hillerman, who would have been the state's second native son to receive the award was, ultimately, replaced by John Grisham. Library Journal reported that Grisham donated the monetary prize to his Hurricane Katrina relief fund, and also used the occasion to research details for The Innocent Man: Murder and Injustice in a Small Town, his non-fiction account of an Oklahoma inmate cleared of murder charges shortly before his execution date. Reporting on Grisham's selection as Hillerman's replacement, a Virginia newspaper called the Helmerich Award the "best literary award you've never heard of."

The 2017 honoree is novelist Richard Ford.

== List of winners ==
The following authors have received the award since 1985:

- 1985 Norman Cousins
- 1986 Larry McMurtry
- 1987 John Updike
- 1988 Toni Morrison
- 1989 Saul Bellow
- 1990 John le Carré
- 1991 Eudora Welty
- 1992 Norman Mailer
- 1993 Peter Matthiessen
- 1994 Ray Bradbury
- 1995 David McCullough
- 1996 Neil Simon
- 1997 John Hope Franklin
- 1998 E. L. Doctorow
- 1999 Margaret Atwood
- 2000 William Manchester
- 2001 William Kennedy
- 2002 Joyce Carol Oates
- 2003 Shelby Foote
- 2004 David McCullough
- 2005 John Grisham
- 2006 Mark Helprin
- 2007 Thomas Keneally
- 2008 Michael Chabon
- 2009 Geraldine Brooks
- 2010 Ian McEwan
- 2011 Alan Furst
- 2012 Wendell Berry
- 2013 Kazuo Ishiguro
- 2014 Ann Patchett
- 2015 Rick Atkinson
- 2016 Billy Collins
- 2017 Richard Ford
- 2018 Hilary Mantel
- 2019 Stacy Schiff
- 2020 Marilynne Robinson
- 2022 Elizabeth Strout
- 2023 Amor Towles
- 2024 H. W. Brands

== See also ==
- Tulsa City-County Library
