= Qserv =

Scottish company

Qserv Ltd.
- Founded: November 2001; 24 years ago
- Founder: Tommy Dreelan
- Defunct: July 4, 2008; 17 years ago
- Fate: Acquired by Aker Solutions, then EQT AB
- Headquarters: Portlethen, Aberdeen

Qserv Ltd. specialised in oil-well services operations, including slickline, coiled tubing and pumping services. In July 2008, the company was acquired by Aker Solutions and it was acquired by EQT AB in 2013.

The company was named after its focus of "Quality Service".

== History ==
The company was founded in November 2001 by Tommy Dreelan.

In 2004, the company was awarded a contract by ExxonMobil.

In March 2005, it was awarded a 5-year well service contract by BP.

In 2005, for the 3rd year in a row, the company won the International Safety Award from the British Safety Council.

In July 2006, it acquired the coiled-tubing unit of Weatherford International.

In December 2006, it acquired the wireline and well-service division of KCA DEUTAG.

In July 2008, the company was acquired by Aker Solutions for $198 million and was renamed Aker Qserv.

In 2013, Aker Solutions sold its entire well-intervention division, including Qserv, to EQT AB for £400 million.
