= Peggy Dow =

American actress (born 1928)

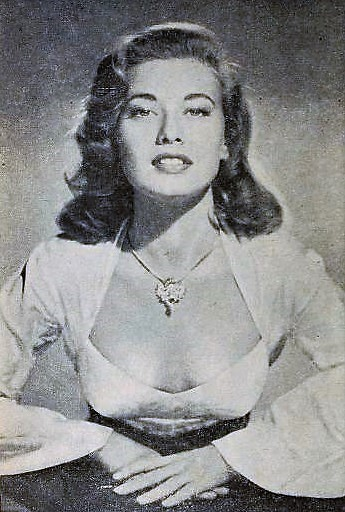
- Dow in Modern Screen magazine (1952)
- Born: Peggy Josephine Varnadow; March 18, 1928 (age 98); Columbia, Mississippi, U.S.
- Other name: Peggy V. Helmerich
- Education: University of Southern Mississippi; Northwestern University
- Occupation: Film actress
- Years active: 1949–1952
- Spouse: Walter Helmerich III (m. 1951; died 2012)
- Children: 5

Peggy Dow (born Peggy Josephine Varnadow; March 18, 1928) is an American philanthropist and former actress who had a brief (1949–1952) career in Hollywood at Universal Studios starring in films during the Golden Age Era in the late 1940s and early 1950s. She is perhaps best known for her roles as Nurse Kelly in Harvey (1950) and Judy Greene in Bright Victory (1951).

== Early life ==
Born in Columbia, Mississippi, at the age of 4 she moved with her family to Covington, Louisiana. She attended high school and junior college at Gulf Park College in Gulfport, Mississippi (now the Gulf Park campus of the University of Southern Mississippi), then finished college at Northwestern University in Illinois, appearing in college plays and receiving her degree from Northwestern's School of Speech in 1948.

== Career ==
After brief modeling and radio experience, Dow was spotted by a talent agent and cast in a television show in February 1949. Shortly after that exposure, Universal offered her a seven-year contract. Dow made nine films, most notably as Nurse Kelly in Harvey (1950), starring James Stewart and Josephine Hull, and co-starring with Best Actor Oscar nominee Arthur Kennedy in Bright Victory (1951). After being featured in several crime dramas, Dow had starring roles in two 1951 family films, Reunion in Reno and You Never Can Tell.

Dow retired after three years in the business to marry Walter Helmerich III, an oil driller from Tulsa, Oklahoma, in 1951. He became president of his family's business, Helmerich & Payne. They were married for 60 years, until his death in 2012. The couple had five sons. She became an active supporter of libraries and other charities.

The Peggy V. Helmerich Distinguished Author Award, an award given annually since 1985 to a distinguished author by the Tulsa Library Trust, is named in her honor, as is the drama school at the University of Oklahoma, the collaborative study area at Bizzell Memorial Library, and the auditorium at Northwestern University School of Communication's Annie May Swift Hall.

== Filmography ==
- Your Show Time (TV anthology series) (1949)
- Undertow (1949)
- Woman in Hiding (1950)
- Shakedown (1950)
- The Sleeping City (1950)
- Harvey (1950)
- Bright Victory (1951)
- You Never Can Tell (1951)
- Reunion in Reno (1951)
- I Want You (1951)
- The Cases of Eddie Drake (TV series) (1952)
