= Walter Helmerich =

American oil businessman (1923–2012)

- Born: January 23, 1923
- Died: January 10, 2012 (aged 88)
- Spouse: Peggy Dow
- Children: 5 sons
- Father: Walter Helmerich II
- Relatives: Charles Francis Colcord (grandfather)

Walter Helmerich III (January 23, 1923 – January 10, 2012) was an American oil businessman from Tulsa, Oklahoma.

He was born on January 23, 1923 in Tulsa, Oklahoma, the son of Walter Helmerich II, co-founder of Helmerich & Payne (H&P) and Cadijah Colcord, daughter of Charles Francis Colcord.

He joined H&P in 1950, became president in 1960, and oversaw the company's growth into a multinational drilling company.

He was CEO of (H&P) until 1989, when his son, Hans Helmerich, took over. He was H&P chairman of H&P until 2011.

Helmerich had intended to be a teacher, but in 1950 he met the Hollywood actress Peggy Dow. His father persuaded him to go to Harvard Business School. In 1951, he married Peggy Dow, and they had five sons.

He died on January 10, 2012 at the age of 88.
