= The Milkman =

1950 comedy film by Charles Barton

- Film poster
- Directed by: Charles Barton
- Screenplay by: Albert Beich; James O'Hanlon; Martin Ragaway; Leonard Stern
- Story by: Martin Ragaway; Leonard Stern
- Produced by: Ted Richmond
- Starring: Donald O'Connor; Jimmy Durante; Piper Laurie
- Cinematography: Clifford Stine
- Edited by: Russell F. Schoengarth
- Color process: Black and white
- Production company: Universal International Pictures
- Distributed by: Universal Pictures
- Release dates: November 22, 1950 (Los Angeles); December 30, 1950 (New York)
- Running time: 87 minutes
- Country: United States
- Language: English

The Milkman is a 1950 American comedy film directed by Charles Barton and starring Donald O'Connor, Jimmy Durante and Piper Laurie.

== Plot ==
Roger Bradley is denied a milkman job at his father's company because of his postwar trauma; when he becomes stressed or frustrated, he quacks like a duck. In revenge, Roger secures a job with his father's archrival Breezy Albright at another milk company. Roger becomes very successful and quickly falls in love with the boss's daughter Chris Abbott.

== Cast ==
- Donald O'Connor as Roger Bradley
- Jimmy Durante as Breezy Albright
- Piper Laurie as Chris Abbott
- Joyce Holden as Ginger Burton
- William Conrad as Mike Morrel
- Henry O'Neill as Bradley Sr.
- Paul Harvey as D.A. Abbott
- Jess Barker as John Carter
- Elisabeth Risdon as Mrs. Carter
- Frank Nelson as Mr. Green
- Charles Flynn as Sgt. Larkin
- Garry Owen as Irving
- John Cliff as Joe
- Billy Nelson as Duke (as Bill Nelson)

== Release ==
Prior to the film's American release, it opened in the United Kingdom in September 1950.

== Reception ==
In a contemporary review for The New York Times, critic Bosley Crowthercalled The Milkman an "assortment of nonsense" and wrote: "It is painful to have to greet the New Year with a bleakly unfavorable report on a picture in which the cheeriest comic in all the world hopefully appears. But Universal-International's 'The Milkman' ... doesn't do right by Jimmy Durante, said comic—so it gets what it deserves. ... Mr. Durante is largely left out in the cold. Considering the quality of the humor which four writers have drearily contrived, that is not the least enviable location in which the great man could be. For the lamp of inspiration did not burn very bright when these four fellows put their heads together and tried to bring forth a script. Most of their comic invention is just old beat-up slapstick routines, mechanically put together and directed by Charles Barton in that way."

Critic John L. Scott of the Los Angeles Times wrote: "The idea of teaming the talented pair as milkmen is novel but the script reveals weaknesses as it rolls along, and finally brings in gangsters—a device that is; growing moth-eaten. Every broad comedy nowadays seems to wind up with gangsters chasing the comedians. Come, come, boys, let's think up a new one."
