= Delmar Gardens =

Amusement park at Oklahoma City

Delmar Garden of Oklahoma City was an amusement park in Oklahoma City that operated from 1902 to 1910.

After the emergence of New York's Coney Island, the fad of waterside amusement parks graced with wooden boardwalks spread across the country. Although Oklahoma City was only founded in 1889, civic leaders were eager to provide similar facilities in Oklahoma Territory.

John Sinopoulo and Joseph Marre, who trained at the original Delmar Garden in St. Louis, built the park on the east bank of the North Canadian River on property owned by civic leader and developer Charles Colcord's Colcord Park Corporation. The park was located on about 40 acres (160,000 m^{2}) between Reno Avenue, Western Avenue, and the river. Today's Wheeler Park constituted the southeast boundary of the complex. The park boasted of a 3,000-seat theater, a dance pavilion, a horse racing track, baseball field, swimming pool, exotic animal zoo, railway, a boardwalk beer garden, amusement rides, a penny arcade, a floating wedding chapel, and a hotel and restaurant. The Gardens and Park were served by the city's extensive trolley service, which brought visitors from suburbs miles away in a matter of minutes.

Trolleys arrived at the Delmar Park station with its elevated platform and bridge to the dance pavilion and other structures, all designed by local architect William A. Wells. Kansas-born Wells had studied architecture at the Art Institute of Chicago and may have spent a short time in the Oak Park studio of Frank Lloyd Wright. His designs for the Pioneer Telephone Co. and especially the Colcord Building are more directly reflective of influence from both Wright and Wright's mentor Louis Sullivan.

Sinopoulo was a Greek immigrant who wanted to build a stylish amusement complex that held a uniting theme throughout a park setting. He used an elaborate Art Nouveau styling that blended blissfully with the surrounding woods and river. The interior of the Delmar Garden Theater was designed in intricate Victorian gingerbread, with Art Nouveau accents. Orchestra seating held leather upholstered opera chairs, box seats contained comfortable wicker chairs and love-seats, and three horseshoe shaped balconies were equipped with steep pitch bleachers. While the auditorium had soft gas lighting, the heavily draped stage was brilliantly illuminated by electric switchboard lighting. Built to be a vaudeville house, Delmar Garden Theater also installed film equipment in 1903 to feature The Great Train Robbery, which ran for eleven weeks. Regardless of the fact that film showings at the Delmar proved to be successful, management preferred to continue mainly as a two-a-day vaudeville venue, with only an occasional movie thrown in at the end of a weak vaudeville program. (One advantage for vaudevillians appearing on the family oriented Delmar stage was that they could also present "adult material" in late night sketches at the Delmar Saloon).

During its short lifespan Delmar Gardens served as Oklahoma City's premiere playground, drawing thousands of visitors and attracting entertainers like Lon Chaney Sr. and Buster Keaton, boxers John L. Sullivan and Jack Dempsey, and the legendary race horse Dan Patch. Lon Chaney, Sr. was appearing at Delmar Theater in 1905 when he rescued a beautiful 16-year-old songbird from a flooded basement dressing room. Her name was Cleva Crieghton, and after a whirlwind courtship the couple married in Oklahoma City. Whether or not they took advantage of the romantic Delmar Garden floating chapel is lost to time. In 1904 Tom Mix performed at Delmar Gardens with the Oklahoma Cavalry Band, where he met and became engaged to Kitty Jewel Perrine, daughter of the Perrine Hotel owner where Tom was renting a room.

Delmar Gardens was adjacent to Wheeler Park and the city's first zoo. On May 13, 1902, James B. Wheeler deeded land to the City of Oklahoma City, roughly from the Frisco railroad tracks (today's I-40 realignment) to the Canadian River, "to be perpetually used by party of second part as a public park for the free use and benefit of the citizens of Oklahoma City." As part of the conveyance, the park's name would never be changed.

The entire complex, however, fronted a prairie river, and not the Atlantic Ocean. Swarms of mosquitoes that accompanied the river's annual flooding contributed to Delmar Gardens' demise, and the advent of prohibition was the death blow. It closed in 1910, and the buildings were razed the following year. The zoo, which opened in 1904, moved to Northeast 50th and Eastern Avenue after most of the animals were killed in a major flood in 1923, and became the foundation of today's Oklahoma City Zoo and Botanical Gardens.

With the exception of Wheeler Park, little evidence of Delmar Gardens and its environs remains today. On June 16, 1928, John J. Harden opened his mission revival style Market Theatre (also 3000 seats) on the far northwest corner of the Delmar site. The 40,000-square-foot (3,700 m^{2}) structure, built at a cost of $500,000, featured farmers' fresh produce on the first floor, with concerts, dances, boxing matches and roller skating on the second floor. Hank Williams, Bob Wills and Count Basie have performed there. Now operated as the Oklahoma City Farmers Public Market, the facility's boxoffice lobby, balcony, and stage remain intact. It was placed on the National Register of Historic Places in 1992.

Then Senator Barack Obama made a Presidential campaign stop at the Farmer's Market on March 19, 2007.
