= Hugh Reilly =

American actor (1915–1998)

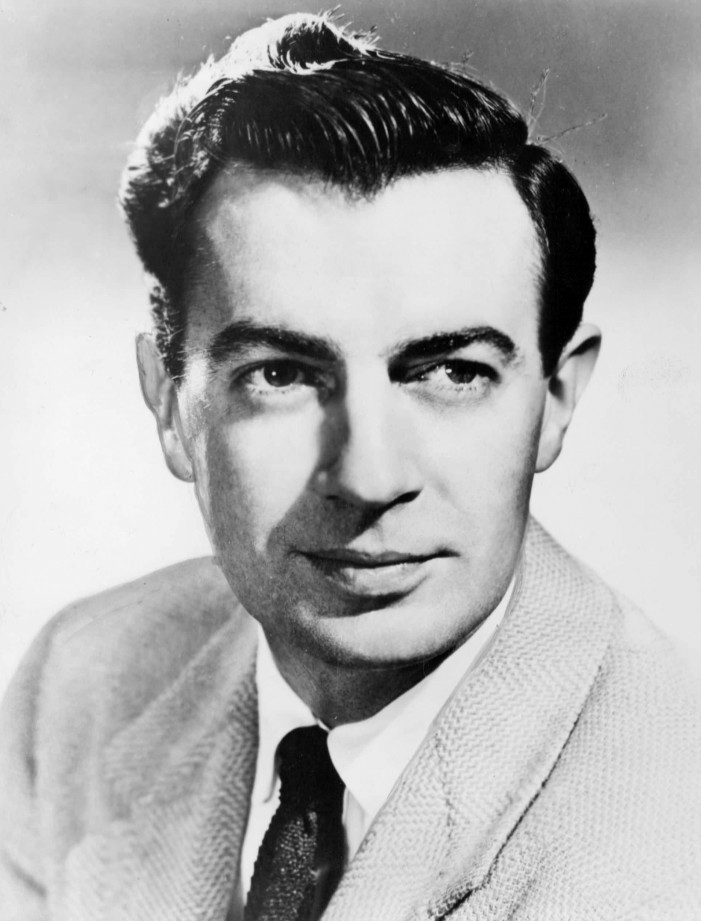
- Reilly in 1954
- Born: Hugh Reilly; October 30, 1915; Newark, New Jersey, U.S.
- Died: July 17, 1998 (aged 82); Burbank, California, U.S.
- Resting place: Forest Lawn Memorial Park (Hollywood Hills)
- Occupations: Theater, film, and TV actor
- Children: 3

Hugh Reilly (October 30, 1915 – July 17, 1998) was an American actor who performed on the Broadway stage, in films, and on television. He is best remembered for co-starring from 1958 to 1964 as the father, Paul Martin, in the CBS television series Lassie.

== Early years and career ==
His Broadway credits included Fair Game (1957), Dear Charles (1954), Never Say Never (1951), Second Threshold (1950), and The Curious Savage (1950).

Reilly worked many early television anthology series. His first screen appearance was in the 1949 episode "The Flying Gerardos" of Kraft Television Theatre. He subsequently was cast in Robert Montgomery Presents (1950–1955), The Ford Television Theatre (1951), Broadway Television Theatre (1953), Armstrong Circle Theatre (1953–1957), Appointment with Adventure (twice in 1955), The Alcoa Hour (1956), Crossroads (as host of the 1956 episode "Through the Window"), The United States Steel Hour (1958).

He portrayed David Naughton, the title character's husband, in the American television series Claudia (1952). His film appearances include Johnny Stool Pigeon (1949) and Bright Victory (1951).

== Final years ==
Reilly continued to work sporadically in television through the 1970s. He was cast against type on CBS's The Edge of Night soap opera where he played Dr. Simon Jessup, a fake spiritualist/attempted murderer, from December 1971 to May 1973. He appeared in one episode each on ABC's The F.B.I. in 1967 and on NBC's Father Murphy in 1982.

== Death ==
Hugh Reilly died on July 17, 1998, in Burbank, California, of emphysema. He had three sons: Joshua, Ethan and David Reilly.

== Filmography ==
| Year | Title | Role | Notes |
|---|---|---|---|
| 1949 | Johnny Stool Pigeon | Charlie | |
| 1950 | The Sleeping City | Dr. Foster | Uncredited |
| 1951 | Bright Victory | Capt. Phelan | |
| 1963 | Lassie's Great Adventure | Paul Martin | |
| 1964 | Lassie: A Christmas Tail | Paul Martin | |
| 1967 | Chuka | Captain Carrol | |
| 1982 | Voyager from the Unknown | Captain Smith | |
