= Johnny Stool Pigeon =

1949 film by William Castle

- Theatrical release poster
- Directed by: William Castle
- Screenplay by: Robert L. Richards
- Story by: Henry Jordan
- Produced by: Aaron Rosenberg
- Starring: Howard Duff; Shelley Winters; Dan Duryea
- Cinematography: Maury Gertsman
- Edited by: Ted J. Kent
- Music by: Milton Schwarzwald
- Color process: Black and white
- Production company: Universal International Pictures
- Distributed by: Universal Pictures
- Release date: April 20, 1949
- Running time: 75 minutes
- Country: United States
- Language: English

Johnny Stool Pigeon is a 1949 American film noir crime film directed by William Castle and starring Howard Duff, Shelley Winters and Dan Duryea.

== Plot ==
A narcotics agent convinces a convict he helped send to Alcatraz to go undercover with him to help expose a heroin drug smuggling ring. The unlikely pair travels from San Francisco to Vancouver and finally to a dude ranch in Tucson which is run by mob bosses. They end up getting help breaking the case from the gang leader's girlfriend (Winters), who falls for the narcotics agent during the sting.

== Cast ==
- Howard Duff as George Morton aka Mike Doyle
- Shelley Winters as Terry
- Dan Duryea as Johnny Evans
- Tony Curtis as Joey Hyatt (as Anthony Curtis)
- John McIntire as Avery
- Gar Moore as Sam Harrison
- Leif Erickson as Pringle
- Barry Kelley as McCandles
- Hugh Reilly as Charlie
- Wally Maher as Benson

== Production ==
The film was known as Contraband and Partners in Crime.

It was William Castle's first movie at Universal. He called it "a pedestrian thriller" with its claim to fame being its cast.

== Reception ==
When the film was released, the film critic for The New York Times, gave the film a tepid review, writing, "Despite a serious attempt at authenticity it is merely a brisk cops-and-smugglers melodrama, which follows an obvious pattern and is fairly strong on suspense and short on originality and impressive histrionics ... Howard Duff, who has had plenty of experience as a gumshoe both on the radio and in films, is appropriately self-effacing, hard and handsome as the intrepid agent. Dan Duryea adds a surprising twist to his usual characterizations of tough hombres as the convict who turns on his own kind, and Shelley Winters gives a credible performance as the blonde moll who also gives the law a much-needed assist. But aside from a few variations their crime and punishment adventures are cast in a familiar mold."

== See also ==
- List of American films of 1949
