= Joyce Holden =

American actress (1930–2022)

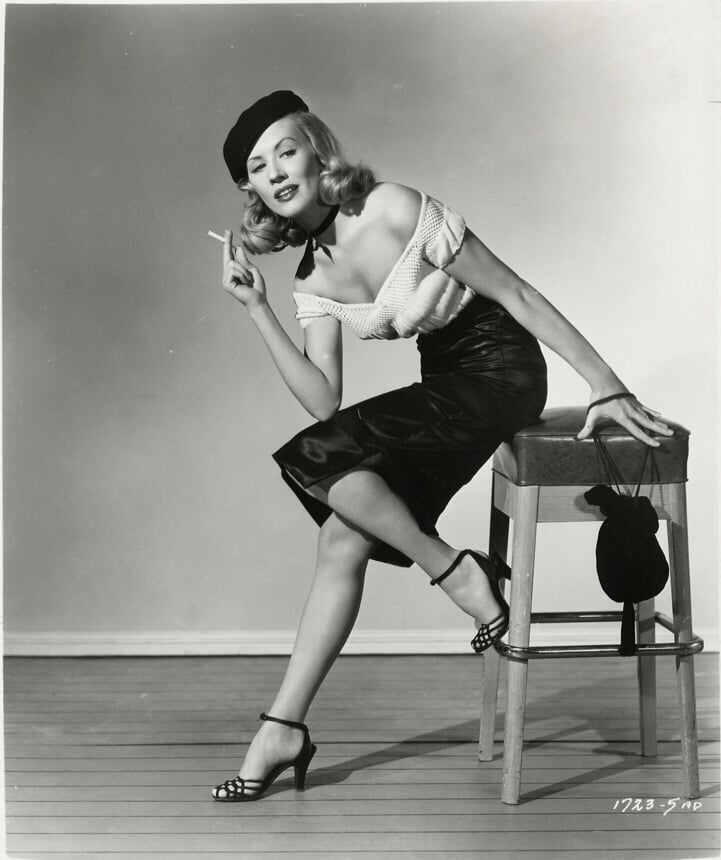
- Holden in 1952
- Born: Jo Ann Heckert; September 1, 1930; Kansas City, Missouri, U.S.
- Died: January 21, 2022 (aged 91); Encinitas, California, U.S.
- Occupation: Actress
- Spouse(s): Arnold Stanford (1951–1955; divorced); David P. Mannhalter (1958–2022)

Joyce Holden (born Jo Ann Heckert, September 1, 1930 – January 21, 2022) was an American film and television actress.

== Early years ==
Holden was born in Kansas City, Missouri on September 1, 1930. The daughter of Mr. and Mrs. D.P. Heckert, she was of Swedish, English, German and Dutch ancestry.

As a teenager, she modeled at a department store and used her drawing abilities to win a scholarship to the Kansas City Art Institute. In the summer before Holden's senior year in high school, she and her brother went with their mother to Los Angeles, intending to spend two weeks' vacation there. Instead, they stayed, and she attended Hollywood High School her senior year. She went on to study at the University of California, Los Angeles (UCLA).

== Film ==
Holden's screen debut was in Universal-International's The Milkman (1950). Her other films included Iron Man (1951), Bronco Buster, Girls in the Night (1953) and You Never Can Tell (1951).

In 1958, she retired from acting after having appeared in 13 films.

Holden starred in the B-movie , Terror from the Year 5000, (1958) as the daughter of an Atomic Time Research scientist ,Claire Erling.

Lee Cozad wrote in the book More Magnificent Mountain Movies, "Holden found herself in a Hollywood that was awash with young brunette starlets and subsequently hung on for a couple of years, playing bit parts in 'A' movies and a few leads in 'B' pictures."

In a 1952 newspaper column distributed by Newspaper Enterprise Association, Holden attributed the difficulties in her film career to the fact that she started in comedy films. "It's murder when a young actress is stamped as a comedienne in Hollywood," she said. "My big mistake was in showing I had a comedy flair. There's no chance in Hollywood for an actress who starts out in comedy. You graduate into it."

== Television ==
Holden was a regular on The Donald O'Connor Show (1954-1955). She also appeared in the Spin and Marty segment on The Mickey Mouse Club.

== Personal life ==
On June 16, 1951, Holden married song writer Arnold Stanford in Las Vegas, Nevada. They were divorced on October 31, 1955.

Holden wed her second husband, industrial real estate broker David Mannhalter, in 1958. The couple were active members of the Jehovah's Witnesses. She died in Encinitas, California on January 21, 2022, at the age of 91.
