= Shakedown (1950 film) =

1950 film by Joseph Pevney

- Theatrical release poster
- Directed by: Joseph Pevney (as Joe Pevney)
- Screenplay by: Martin Goldsmith; Alfred Lewis Levitt
- Story by: Nat Dallinger; Don Martin
- Produced by: Ted Richmond
- Starring: Howard Duff; Brian Donlevy; Peggy Dow; Lawrence Tierney; Bruce Bennett; Anne Vernon
- Cinematography: Irving Glassberg
- Edited by: Milton Carruth
- Color process: Black and white
- Production company: Universal Pictures
- Distributed by: Universal Pictures
- Release dates: September 1, 1950 (United States); September 3, 1950 (New York City)
- Running time: 80 minutes
- Country: United States
- Language: English

Shakedown is a 1950 American crime film noir directed by Joseph Pevney and starring Howard Duff, Brian Donlevy, Peggy Dow, Lawrence Tierney, Bruce Bennett and Anne Vernon.

== Plot ==
Unscrupulous newspaper photographer Jack Early is sent to take a picture of racketeer Nick Palmer, who doesn't like to be photographed. Palmer takes a liking to Early and asks him to frame his henchman Colton, but Early double-crosses Palmer and informs Colton that his boss had planned to frame him. Shortly afterward, Palmer is killed by a car bomb and Early becomes famous for snapping a photo of the event. Eventually Early is killed by Colton but he manages to take a picture of his murderer in the act.

== Cast ==
- Howard Duff as Jack Early
- Brian Donlevy as Nick Palmer
- Peggy Dow as Ellen Bennett
- Lawrence Tierney as Colton
- Bruce Bennett as David Glover
- Anne Vernon as Nita Palmer (as Ann Vernon)
- Stapleton Kent as City Editor
- Peter Virgo as Roy
- Charles Sherlock as Sam
- Rock Hudson as Nightclub Doorman (uncredited)

== See also ==
- List of American films of 1950
