= Norman Cousins =

American political journalist, author, professor, and advocate (1915-1990)

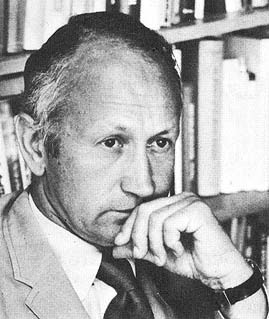
- Born: June 24, 1915; West Hoboken, New Jersey, U.S.
- Died: November 30, 1990 (aged 75); Los Angeles, California, U.S.
- Education: Teachers College, Columbia University (B.A.)

Signature
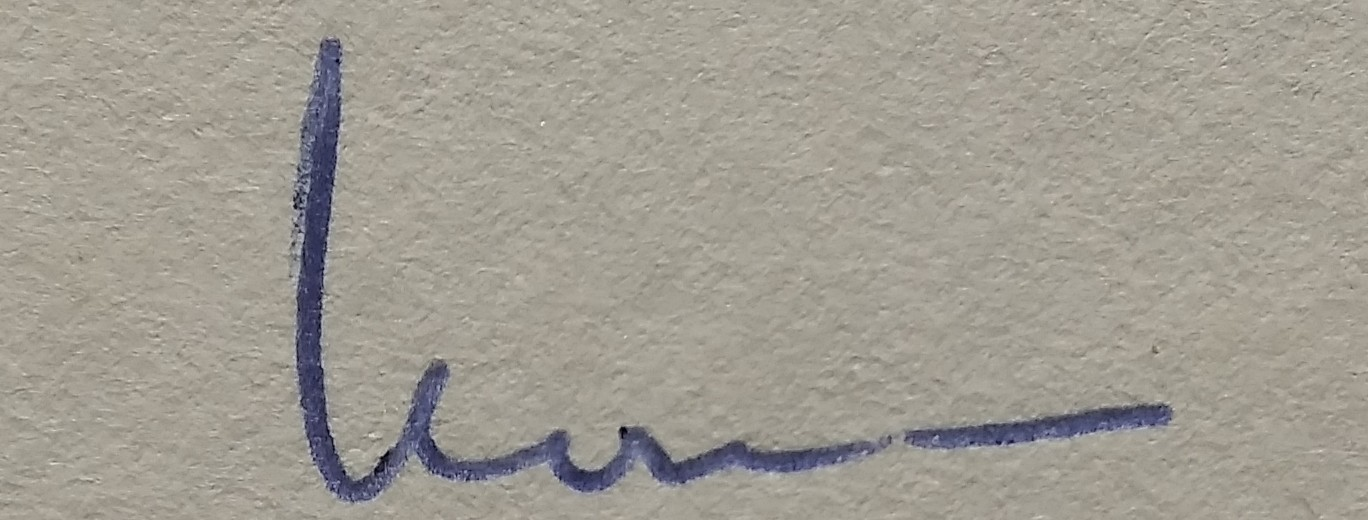

Norman Cousins (June 24, 1915 – November 30, 1990) was an American political journalist, author, professor, and world peace through world state advocate.

== Early life ==
Cousins was born to Jewish immigrant parents Samuel Cousins and Sarah Babushkin Cousins, in West Hoboken, New Jersey (which later became Union City). At age 11, he was misdiagnosed with tuberculosis and placed in a sanatorium. Despite this, he was an athletic youth, and he claimed that as a young boy he "set out to discover exuberance."

Cousins attended Theodore Roosevelt High School in the Bronx, New York City, graduating on February 3, 1933. He edited the high school paper, "The Square Deal," where his editing abilities were already in evidence. Cousins received a bachelor's degree from Teachers College, Columbia University, in New York City.

His sister Jean married Tom Middleton.

== Career ==
He joined the staff of the New York Evening Post (now the New York Post) in 1934, and in 1935 was hired by Current History as a book critic. He later ascended to the position of managing editor. He also befriended the staff of the Saturday Review of Literature (later renamed Saturday Review), which had its offices in the same building, and by 1940, joined the staff of that publication as well. He was named editor-in-chief in 1942, a position he would hold until 1972. Under his direction, circulation of the publication increased from 20,000 to 650,000.

Cousins joined the University of California, Los Angeles faculty in 1978 and became an adjunct professor in the Department of Psychiatry and Biobehavioral Sciences. He taught ethics and medical literature. His research interest was the connection between attitude and health.

== Political views and activism ==
Politically, Cousins was an advocate of liberal causes, such as nuclear disarmament and world peace, which he promoted through his writings in Saturday Review. In a 1984 forum at the University of California, Berkeley, titled "Quest for Peace", Cousins recalled the editorial he wrote on August 6, 1945, the day the United States dropped the atomic bomb in Hiroshima. Titled "The Modern Man is Obsolete", Cousins, who stated that he felt "the deepest guilt" over the bomb's use on civilian targets, discussed in the editorial the implications of the atomic bomb and nuclear power. He got it published the next day in the Review, and the response was considerable, as it was reprinted in newspapers and enlarged into a book, was reprinted in seven languages, and had an estimated circulation in the United States of seven million. An element of the book is that Cousins rejected what later became known as MAD and Deterrence theory. The possibility of war, he suggested, increases in proportion to the effectiveness of weapons. “Far from banishing war, the atomic bomb may in itself constitute a cause of war.” It promises aggressors a “lightening blow of annihilation… What a temptation for the blitzkrieger!” Later, he added a collection of non-fiction books on the same subjects, such as the 1953 Who Speaks for Man?, which advocated a World Federation and nuclear disarmament.

Despite his role as an advocate of liberalism, he jokingly expressed opposition to women entering the workforce. In 1939, upon learning that the number of women in the workforce was close to the number of unemployed males, he offered a solution: "Simply fire the women, who shouldn't be working anyway, and hire the men. Presto! No unemployment. No relief rolls. No depression."

A proponent of world state as the solution to wars, Cousins attempted to frighten humanity into world state, even though his reach in that regard was limited. He knew that wars killed many people in history and the total number of killed would be useful to his aims. But this number is neither known nor knowable. Cousins thought about some high number and decided that 3,640,000,000 would be good enough. He published the number in 1953. For decades since, the number circulated in scholarly literature in various countries as established fact and caused several scholars to search in archives for its source. The search yielded no result. The number proved to be “hoax” and even Cousins' method of extrapolation remained an unsolved puzzle.

In the 1950s, Cousins played a prominent role in bringing the Hiroshima Maidens, a group of twenty-five Hibakusha, to the United States for medical treatment. He served as president of the World Federalist Association and chairman of the Committee for Sane Nuclear Policy, which warned that the world was bound for a nuclear holocaust if the threat of the nuclear arms race was not stopped. In the 1960s, he began the American-Soviet Dartmouth Conferences for peace process. Following the 1962 Cuban missile crisis, President John F. Kennedy saw that he was the proper person to find the terms that would be accepted by Nikita Khrushchev to avert nuclear war. Both sides used unofficial intermediaries to relay messages outside the usual diplomatic routes. For example Kennedy used Norman Cousins, who was well appreciated in Moscow for his leadership of SANE, the Committee for a SANE Nuclear Policy. This helped the two leaders forge the highly successful Limited Test Ban Treaty of 1963. For his role he was thanked by President John F. Kennedy and Pope John XXIII; the Pope also awarded him his personal medallion. Cousins was also awarded the Eleanor Roosevelt Peace Award in 1963, the Family Man of the Year Award in 1968, the United Nations Peace Medal in 1971, and the Niwano Peace Prize and the Albert Schweitzer Prize for Humanitarianism, both in 1990. He also served on the board of trustees for Science Service, now known as Society for Science & the Public, from 1972 to 1975.

== Illness, laugh therapy and recovery ==
Cousins did research on the biochemistry of human emotions, which he long believed were the key to human beings' success in fighting illness. It was a belief he maintained even as he battled in 1964 a sudden-onset case of a crippling connective tissue disease, which was also referred to as a collagen disease. Experts at Dr. Rusk's rehabilitation clinic confirmed this diagnosis and added a diagnosis of ankylosing spondylitis. Told that he had one chance in 500 of recovery, Cousins developed his own recovery program. He took massive intravenous doses of Vitamin C and had self-induced bouts of laughter brought on by films of the television show Candid Camera and by various comic films. "I made the joyous discovery that ten minutes of genuine belly laughter had an anesthetic effect and would give me at least two hours of pain-free sleep," he reported. "When the pain-killing effect of the laughter wore off, we would switch on the motion picture projector again and not infrequently, it would lead to another pain-free interval." His struggle with that illness and his discovery of laugh therapy is detailed in his 1979 book Anatomy of an Illness as Perceived by the Patient.

In a commentary questioning whether Cousins cured his disease, Florence Ruderman wrote, "It seems entirely possible that what Cousins had was an acute attack of an arthritic condition which then subsided, slowly, but quite naturally."

Later in life, he and his wife, Ellen, together fought his heart disease, again with exercise, a daily regimen of vitamins, and the good nutrition provided by Ellen's organic garden. He wrote a collection of best-selling non-fiction books on illness and healing, as well as a 1980 autobiographical memoir, Human Options: An Autobiographical Notebook.

== Movie portrayal ==
Cousins was portrayed by actor Ed Asner in a 1984 television movie, Anatomy of an Illness, which was based on Cousins's 1979 book Anatomy of an Illness as Perceived by the Patient: Reflections on Healing. Cousins was not pleased with the commercial nature of the movie, nor with Hollywood's sensationalistic treatment of his experience. He and other members of the Cousins family were also taken aback by the casting of Asner, since the two men bore scant physical resemblance to each other. But Asner tried faithfully, Cousins felt, to convey the spirit of his subject, and once the film was completed, Cousins was said by Asner to look upon the movie with a certain degree of tolerance, if not delight.

== Death ==
Cousins died of heart failure on November 30, 1990, in Los Angeles, having survived years longer than his doctors predicted: 10 years after his first heart attack, 26 years after his collagen illness, and 36 years after his doctors first diagnosed his heart disease.

He and his wife, Ellen, had four children. He is buried at the Mt. Lebanon Jewish Cemetery.

== See also ==
- List of peace activists
- White Light/Black Rain: The Destruction of Hiroshima and Nagasaki (2007)

== Selected works ==
- Modern Man Is Obsolete (1945)
- Writing for Love or Money: Thirty-Five Essays Reprinted from The Saturday Review of Literature (1949)
- Who Speaks for Man? (1953)
- "In God We Trust"; The Religious Beliefs and Ideas of the American Founding Fathers (1958)
- Dr. Schweitzer of Lambaréné (1960)
- In Place of Folly (1962)
- Present Tense; an American Editor's Odyssey (1967)
- Great American Essays (1967)
- The Improbable Triumvirate - An asterisk to the history of a hopeful year, 1962-1963" (1972) ISBN 978-0-393-05396-8
- The Celebration of Life; A Dialogue on Immortality and Infinity (1974) ISBN 978-0-060-61591-8
- Anatomy of an Illness as Perceived by the Patient: Reflections on Healing and Regeneration (1979) ISBN 978-0-393-01252-1
- Human Options: An Autobiographical Notebook (1981) ISBN 978-0-393-33254-4
- La volonté de guérir (1981) ISBN 978-2020055048
- The Physician in Literature (1982) ISBN 978-0-030-59653-7
- The Healing Heart: Antidotes to Panic and Helplessness (1983) ISBN 978-0-393-01816-5
- The Words of Albert Schweitzer (Words of Series) (1984) ISBN 978-0-937-85841-7
- Albert Schweitzer's Mission: Healing and Peace (1985) with Schweitzer ISBN 978-0-393-02238-4
- Nobel Prize Conversations: With Sir John Eccles, Roger Sperry, Ilya Prigogine, Brian Josephson (1985) ISBN 978-0-933-07102-5
- The Human Adventure: A Camera Chronicle (1986) ISBN 978-0-933-07107-0
- The Pathology of Power (1987) ISBN 978-0-393-30541-8
- The Republic of Reason: The Personal Philosophies of the Founding Fathers (1988) ISBN 9780062501615
- Master Photographs: Master Photographs From PFA Exhibitions 1959-67 (1988) ISBN 978-0-933-64212-6
- Head First: The Biology of Hope and the Healing Power of the Human Spirit (1989) ISBN 978-0-140-13965-5
- Mind Over Illness (1991) ISBN 978-1-555-25425-4
- Why Man Explores (2005) ISBN 978-1-410-22031-8

== Awards ==
Cousins received the inaugural Helmerich Award in 1985. The Peggy V. Helmerich Distinguished Author Award is presented annually by the Tulsa Library Trust.
