= Charles Francis Colcord =

American businessman and police chief

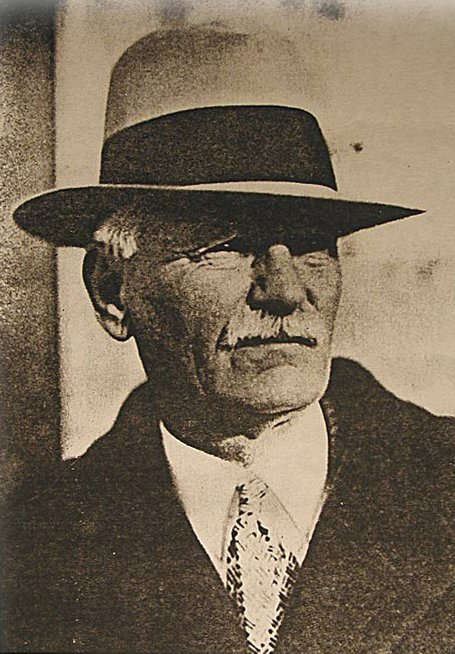
Charles Francis Colcord

Charles Francis Colcord (August 18, 1859 – December 10, 1934) was a cattle rancher, U.S. Marshal, chief of police, businessman, and pioneer of the Old West. The community of Colcord, Oklahoma, is named for him.

Colcord's life spanned the American Civil War, the taming of the west, the cattle drives, the Land Runs, the Wright brothers' flight, World War I, Wiley Post, Will Rogers and Charles Lindbergh, the Roaring Twenties, the Great Depression, and the transition of Oklahoma City from a frontier prairie to a booming metropolis with skyscrapers, oil fields and airplanes. On December 30, 1934, a resolution adopted by the Oklahoma City Chamber of Commerce stated, "Affluence came to him but left unspoiled his native gentleness and simplicity. Always he was modest, humble, democratic, generous, just and kind. He remembered the less fortunate friends of his early days."

== Early years ==
Charles Colcord was born near Cane Ridge, Paris, Bourbon County, Kentucky to Col. William Rogers Colcord (November 26, 1827 – January 10, 1901) and Maria Elizabeth Clay (March 1832, Paris, KY – ?, Denver CO). His father was a son of Charles B. Colcord and Louisa Metcalfe Bristow with deep roots in Kentucky, as attested by his brother's biography:

This interesting and gentlemanly proprietor of Burr Oak farm, [Frank P. Colford] is a son of C. B. Colcord and Louisa Metcalf, who was a niece of the honored George Metcalf. The father of our subject settled in 1813 at Middletown, this county, from the State of New Hampshire, he being then about twenty-seven years of age, and soon after engaged in business at that place with an older brother who accompanied him to his new settlement. Their spirit of business adventure, however, was not to be satisfied in a village traffic, but they engaged in extensive speculation which proved remunerative, C. G.[sic] Colcord being the first man who ever took a drove of mules to New Orleans by land from Bourbon County; he was married to Miss Metcalf in 1824, and by that union were born six children, only two of whom grew to maturity; viz: William R., born Nov. 26, 1827; married in the vicinity of Middletown, now residing in Wichita, Kansas, where he is extensively engaged in the stock business. Our subject was born Sept. 17, 1829; received a liberal education, attending the Western Military Institute in 1849 and '50, then located at Middletown; one of his preceptors and intimate friends being the Honorable James G. Blaine, Secretary of State. Mr. Colcord is an enterprising, thrifty farmer, with 432 acres of choice land, about eight miles from Paris, which he has well stocked, and conducts in a successful manner. He was never married, but enjoys an independent life with his pleasant surroundings.

His mother's parents were William Green Clay and Patsy Bedford of Paris. His maternal grandfather was General Green Clay of Paris, Kentucky, a cousin of Sen. Henry Clay and father of abolitionist Cassius Marcellus Clay.

For much of his young childhood his father was an officer fighting for the Confederacy in the Civil War, and moved his family to Georgia and New Orleans. After the war, the senior Colcord sold his interest in the family farm to his brother and used the proceeds to purchase a sugar plantation north of New Orleans. When son Charley, then about ten, contracted malaria from a nearby swamp, his father sent him to the ranch owned by his friend Charles Sanders near Banquete, Texas, so that he could recover. When W. R. Colcord opened a ranch near Corpus Christi, Texas, to raise horses, Charley ran away to work as a cowboy. In 1875, he was sent on a cattle drive to Baxter Springs followed by a buffalo hunt on the western prairies. There he learned of the need for horses in central Kansas, which he reported back to his father.

== Cattle rancher ==
In 1876 W. R. teamed up with Hines Clark to trail 1200 mares north to pens in the Cherokee Outlet; Charley was among the half-dozen riders. They decided to stay in Kansas and lived near Medicine Lodge in Comanche County.

In the fall of 1877, father moved the rest of the family up from Texas and we built three or four fine big dugouts for them... near the mouth of Red Fork, about five miles from the head of Jug Mott Creek, three miles from Evansville, and about twenty-five miles southeast of ... where Coldwater, Kansas, was afterward built.

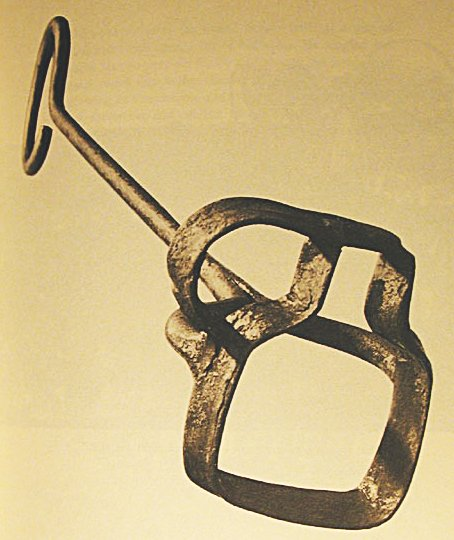
Jug livestock brand, now in the Cowboy Hall of Fame

The senior Colcord teamed up with neighbors R. C. Campbell, Bob Campbell, Billy Carter and Frank Thornton to form the Jug Cattle Company, with Charley employed as range boss. The Jug livestock brand (pictured here), became famous throughout Kansas and Oklahoma.

Colcord's father joined about fourteen of his neighbors to form the Comanche Pool, one of the first corporate ranches in the southwest. Starting with about 26,000 head of cattle around Evansville, Kansas, the pool grew to control nearly 11,000 acres (4,500 ha) shipping over 20,000 cattle to market each year.

This Comanche Pool was the biggest outfit anywhere. It had from sixty to eighty thousand head of cattle belonging to the various pool members, which ran all over the country; in our annual roundup we used to come as far south as Sacred Heart Mission on the Little River, sometimes even to the Red River, ... west as far as the west end of the Panhandle.

In 1879, outlaws John Middleton and Henry Brown left Billy the Kid's gang and stayed at Colcord's camp in the Cherokee Outlet for several weeks. On December 18, 1879, Middleton married Colcord's 15-year-old sister, Maria "Birdie" Colcord, but the marriage only lasted about a year.

During the 1880s, cattle prices remained high and the members of the Comanche Pool continued building their herd. In 1882 a lease was negotiated for over 3,000,000 acres (1,200,000 ha)of land for ten years at an annual rent of two cents an acre, payable semi-annually in advance. By the fall of 1885, the Pool cattle numbered nearly 84,000 head. But by then, reacting to allegations of bribery and fraud, President Cleveland voided the leases that were never approved by the federal government, and ordered all cattle removed from the reservation within forty days. 210,000 head of cattle were moved to the already overstocked ranges of the adjoining states.

An unusually dry summer in 1885 was followed by a bad winter; nearly 85 percent of the cattle died during an 18-month span, reducing Pool assets to a mere 13,000 head. Most of the ranchers were wiped out and moved elsewhere. The Colcord family continued with the Pool until its final collapse. Charley, now married (see below) and his brother William moved to Arizona to manage a ranch, followed by their mother, younger brother and now-divorced sister Birdie.

== Oklahoma years ==
Then the Oklahoma land run was announced. According to one account, Charles made the run on April 22, 1889, then traded his $66 investment in a team and wagon for a shack and lot. By the end of the excitement, a noisy tent city had sprung up, and Colcord was its leading citizen, with his lot becoming Lot Number 1, Block Number 1, Oklahoma City. Another source indicates that Colcord first staked a claim in Hennessey, then immediately sold his claim and arrived in Oklahoma City on April 23, 1889.

In either event, as Oklahoma boomed he served for two years as Chief of Police, then Oklahoma City's first Sheriff (essentially the army left what was a territory, declared it a state, and gave Charlie the stockade and a gun.) He later became a deputy US Marshal for five years, serving with Bill Tilghman. He worked hard to control a lawless, wild area, fighting Bill Doolin, Bill "Tulsa Jack" Blake, the Dalton Gang, Richard "Little Dick" West, and others. He personally rounded up five members of the Dalton Gang and supervised their hanging.

He also participated in the 1893 Cherokee Strip land run and built a home there. During the run his horse ran into the horse of an old friend, Sheriff George Parker of Lincoln County, when George's mount stepped into a prairie dog hole. George said "Stay down, Charlie, that's a corner lot!" and Charlie staked his claim where he fell. In six hours Perry, Oklahoma, had a population of 15,000, and Colcord was appointed marshal.

In 1898 he returned to Oklahoma City and established the Colcord Investment Company and the Colcord Park Corporation, the latter of which developed Delmar Gardens southwest of downtown. He organized and headed the Commercial National Bank of Oklahoma City, was vice president of the State National Bank, president of the Oklahoma City Building & Loan Association, and director of the Oklahoma State Fair Association.

== Oil exploration ==
Colcord also became involved in oil exploration. After Dr. Fred Clinton and Dr. J.C.W. Bland drilled a successful well in 1901 north of Red Fork, 2,500 people were attracted to the area, including Colcord and Robert T. Galbreath who had been partners in a real estate venture. Colcord and Galbreath organized the Red Fork Oil and Gas Co. and drilled the first wells in the town limits of Red Fork. Colcord later drilled in Healdton, Loco and Duncan fields.

Then, on a hunting trip in 1905 with Galbreath and Frank Chesley, Colcord's two Kentucky wolfhounds chased after a wolf and disappeared. A search for the dogs brought them to a farm owned by a Creek Indian named Ida Glenn. While searching for the dogs with Galbreath and Chesley, Chesley discovered a spot where oil was seeping from some rocks. Along with John O. Mitchell, the men eventually secured the right to drill on the land. On November 22, 1905, a discovery well gushed oil, leading to the discovery of the Glenn Pool oil field, which became one of the world's largest known oil fields. Glenpool produced over 340 million barrels of oil over the next century and put Tulsa on the map, by 1907, as the Oil Capital of the World. Galbreath became known as the "Oil King of the Southwest" and was "rated the richest man in Oklahoma." With his share of the profits, Colcord invested $750,000 in the Colcord Building in 1912.

== Later years and death ==
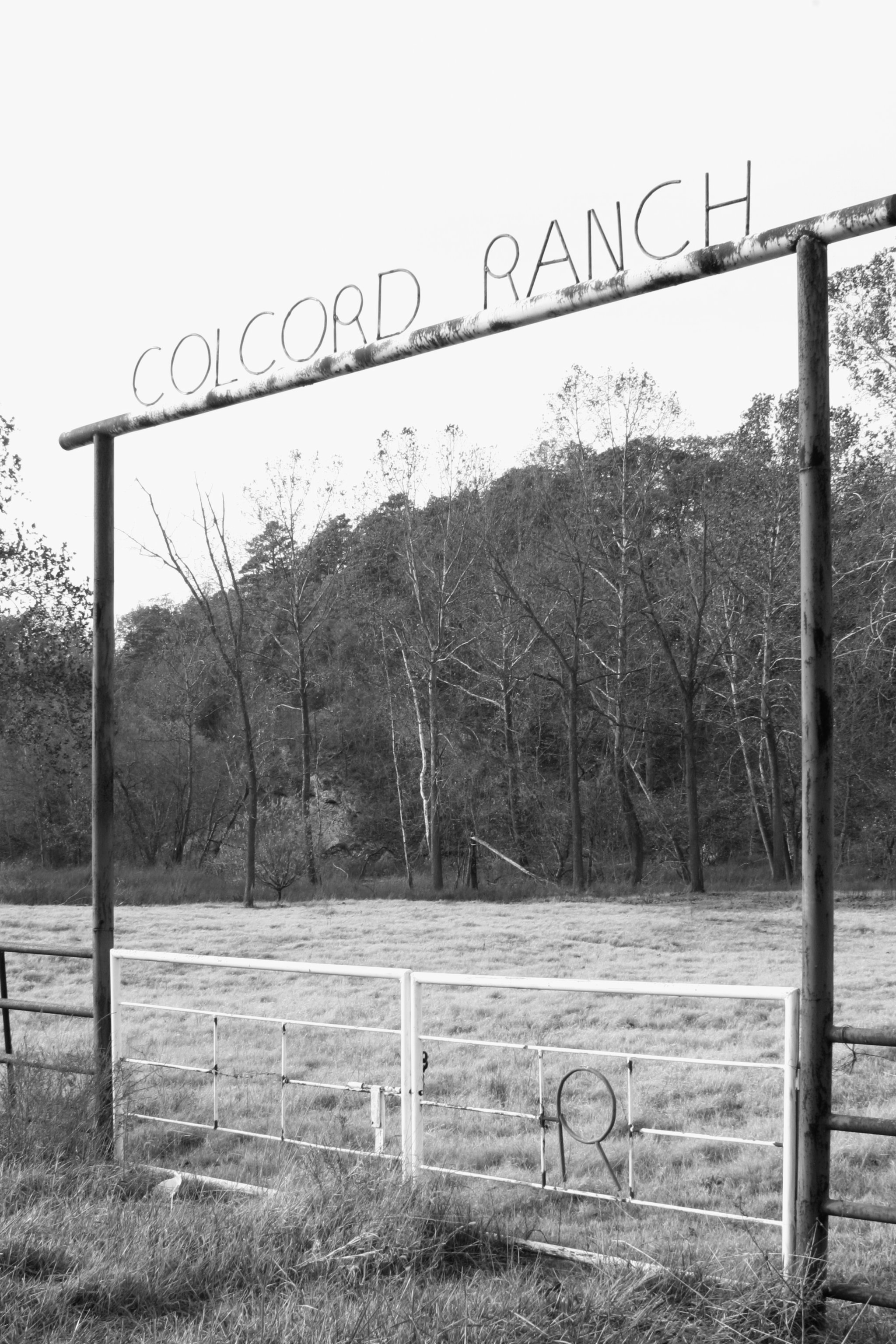
Colcord Ranch (present day)

By the 1920s, Colcord was a wealthy man. He learned of opportunities for cattle ranching in southern Delaware County, Oklahoma, and built a 2,000-acre (810 ha) ranch there. Nearby a little community was springing up that was named after the rancher in February 1930. Mr. Colcord employed many local residents of Colcord, Oklahoma, and was very important to the spirit and economy of the growing town.

In 1933, Colcord had his last episode with lawbreakers. A close friend of his, Charles Urschel, was kidnapped by Machine Gun Kelly and his gang and held for ransom, not uncommon in those Depression days. Colcord called a meeting at the Colcord Building of the richest men in Oklahoma City and put together a large reward. Kelly was eventually captured, and Charles Urschel was returned unharmed.

A Democrat in politics, Colcord was president of the Oklahoma City Chamber of Commerce in 1914 and president of the Oklahoma Historical Society during the 1920s and 1930s until his death. He was inducted into the Oklahoma Hall of Fame in 1929 and had achieved the thirty-second degree of the Masonic Order. He was also a member of the Oklahoma Consistory of the Valley of Guthrie, the Indian Temple, Ancient Arabic Order of the Nobles of the Mystic Shrine, and the Golf and Country Club.

A few months before his death, as president of the Historical Society, Oklahoma's "First Citizen" gave an address at a reunion of the Medicine Lodge Peace Treaty pioneers that gave remarkable insight into the history of the Great Plains.

He died in 1934 at age 75 at his Delaware County ranch; with a police honor guard, his body lay in state in the rotunda of the Oklahoma Historical Society building. At his death, his estate was unofficially valued at $1.5 million, the equivalent of about $24 million in 2009. He is buried in Oklahoma City's Fairlawn Cemetery.

His tombstone reads:

His life was gentle, and the elements
So mix'd in him, that Nature might stand up —
And say to all the world, "This was a man".

== Family ==
Over her family's objections, Charles Francis Colcord married Harriet Scoresby (August 1865, Iowa – June 26, 1951, Oklahoma City), in Hutchinson, Kansas on February 9, 1885. She was the daughter of Rev. Thomas Smith Scoresby, a Methodist Episcopal minister born in England.

I went up to Elm Creek to attend a dance given by Mrs. Slack, an elder sister of Harriet Scoresby and fell violently in love with her at first sight and determined to have her for my wife. The second time I met Harriet I was driving a herd of cattle from the range into Kansas. Her father, her uncles and all other members of her family were bitterly opposed to Harriet marrying a wild cowpuncher. I made up my mind all the preachers in Kansas could not stop me. I talked to Harriet's brother-in-law, who lived in Barber County, Kansas and he told me the whole family was opposed to me because people had exaggerated reports about me. I think this brother-in-law did a lot towards breaking down this opposition and Harriet's mother, who was one of the greatest women I ever knew, was favorable toward me from the very start. Also a young brother, O. C. Storesby, who was something of a wild kid himself, seemed to take a liking to me and often helped me out in meeting his sister.

They moved to Flagstaff, Arizona, before participating in the Run. They had seven children:

- Ray Colcord (born September 12, 1886, died February 1971, St. Petersburg FL), married Rena Piner
- Charles F. Colcord Jr. (born June 12, 1888, in Kansas, died August 23, 1900, in Oklahoma City)
- Marguerite Colcord (Mrs. Lee Dudley) Callahan, died May 1980 in Oklahoma City).
- Caroline Colcord (Mrs. John Wesley) Bates, b. August 8, 1895, Oklahoma Territory, died October 13, 1995, Tulsa)
- Sidney Colcord (born February 17, 1898, in Oklahoma Territory, died December 22, 1969, in Tulsa)
- Cadijah Colcord (Mrs. Walter H.) Helmerich (1899–1990), married Walter Helmerich II.
- Harriet Colcord White (born September 2, 1901, died June 1979, Oklahoma City)

== Legacies ==
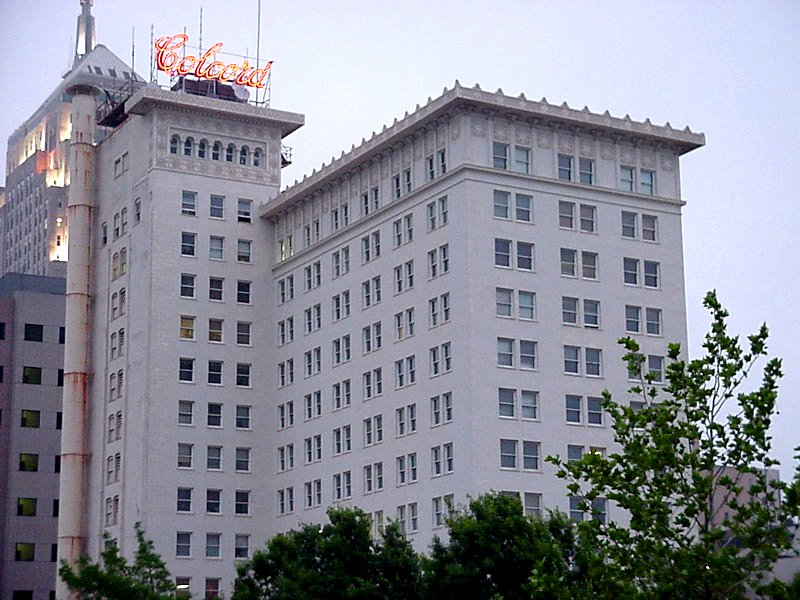
Colcord Building, Oklahoma City

Colcord built the Colcord Building, now known as the Colcord Hotel, which was the first skyscraper in Oklahoma City. It was also the first steel-reinforced concrete building in Oklahoma, because Colcord had seen the devastation to lesser buildings in San Francisco following the 1906 San Francisco earthquake and resulting fires. Originally designed with two wings, only the east wing and connecting elevator/stair segment were constructed. Architect William A. Wells was a protégé of Louis Sullivan, a founder of the Chicago School style of architecture. Sullivan designed the molds for the decorative terra cotta ornamentation on the first, second, and twelfth floors of the Colcord. The building survived Oklahoma City's Urban Renewal efforts and is listed on the National Register of Historic Places. Developer Paul Coury, with the help of investors including Beck Design and Manhattan Construction, have transformed the office building into a boutique hotel adjacent to what will be the state's tallest building, the new 51-story, 274 metres/900 feet Devon Tower. The Colcord Building is now owned by Devon Energy. Colcord also built the Commerce Exchange Building and the Biltmore Hotel.

When he died Oklahoma City named the new Civic Center after him. His dedication to the city and his cowboy origins landed him in the Cowboy Hall of Fame.

Colcord built one of Oklahoma City's first great mansions in 1901 at 421 Northwest 13th Street, beginning the development of what was soon Oklahoma City's finest "suburban" neighborhood. Colcord's three-story pillared Georgian home with its beveled-glass windows, mirrored ballroom, and carriage house was demolished in 1965 and replaced by a now-failed insurance company building. Alarm of the demolition of the Colcord mansion led to the establishment of a historical preservation district in what became known as "Heritage Hills" and the preservation of the nearby Henry Overholser mansion and other monuments to the early days of the city. In their book, "Vanished Spendor", Jim Edwards and Hal Ottaway (Abalache Book Shop Publishing Co. 1982), gives the following description of the home:

Built and designed by William A. Wells, this mansion was almost an exact replica of Mr. Colcord's father's home in Kentucky. It had twenty-five rooms, besides halls, nooks, closets, and baths.

In 1959, he was inducted into the Hall of Great Westerners of the National Cowboy & Western Heritage Museum.
