= Woman in Hiding =

1950 film by Michael Gordon

- Theatrical release poster
- Directed by: Michael Gordon
- Screenplay by: Oscar Saul; Roy Huggins (adaptation)
- Based on: the SEP story "Fugitive from Terror" by James Webb
- Produced by: Michael Kraike
- Starring: Ida Lupino; Stephen McNally; Howard Duff
- Cinematography: William H. Daniels
- Edited by: Milton Carruth
- Color process: Black and white
- Production company: Universal-International
- Distributed by: Universal-International
- Release date: January 6, 1950
- Running time: 92 minutes
- Country: United States
- Language: English

Woman in Hiding is a 1950 American melodrama thriller film starring Ida Lupino, Howard Duff and Stephen McNally. It was directed by Michael Gordon, with cinematography by William H. Daniels. Peggy Dow, John Litel, and Taylor Holmes, appear in support. Some observers regard the picture as a film noir, a view not universally embraced.

== Plot ==
Deborah Chandler Clark surreptitiously watches police drag a North Carolina river for her body. She recounts the events that brought her to her peril, beginning when her father, a mill owner in once-prosperous Clarksville, disapproved of a romance between her and the mill's general manager, Selden Clark IV. Scion of the town's founding family he may be, Clark has no fortune, is brutish, aggressive, and despised by Mr. Chandler.

Soon Chandler falls to his death at the mill. Clark consoles Deborah and proposes. Arriving at their honeymoon cabin, a jealous and angry woman, Patricia Monahan, is already there, claiming she has been romantically involved with Clark. She insists he murdered Deborah's father and married her simply to gain control of the family mill. Monahan storms off, but both claims ring true to Deborah. She removes her wedding ring and demands an annulment.

Sneaking out in the night, Deborah flees in the couple's car down a steep, winding mountainside. Clark had tampered with the brakes, and the car careens wildly out of control. She leaps out just before it crashes into the river, and eludes Clark's determined flashlight search for her. Believing she would be unable to prove her husband's guilt, she disappears, bussing straight to Raleigh to seek out Monahan and convince her to go together to the police about Clark.

Monahan has mysteriously gone "out of town" for several weeks. Deborah resigns herself to waiting her out.

Convinced Deborah's still alive, and will lead him to a hangman's noose, Clark posts a $5,000 reward for anyone who can lead him to her, whom he insists has had a nervous breakdown, needs help, and must be committed to an asylum.

A chance meeting in Raleigh with a bored ex-soldier, Keith Ramsey, piques the young dreamer's interest in Deborah - purely romantic, until he learns of the $5,000 reward.

Fearing she will be discovered from her picture in the ads Clark has taken out, Deborah bleaches her dark hair blonde and seeks to flee. Ramsey, who plans to use the windfall to open a boat building business on the northern California coast, tails her, pretending it's a coincidence. She claims she is Ann Carter.

Thinking she can elude him she ducks off the bus in Knoxville, Tennessee. He follows.

Initially suspicious of Ramsey, the fright-riddled Deborah is so desperate for anyone to trust she begins to thaw toward the handsome, seemingly caring man. Convinced she needs psychiatric care, he calls Clark and tells him he believes he has found his wife. At a hotel hosting a boisterous convention, Clark appears and nearly succeeds in throwing Deborah down a six-story flights of fire exit stairs; only a chance interruption by some drunken conventioneers ends their struggle as they are mistaken for an aggressive romantic advance.

Deborah escapes and locks herself in her room, terrified. Finally confiding in Ramsey, she puts her complete trust in him. Imagining Deborah has had a hallucinations, he again covertly contacts Clark back in Clarksville.

Convinced by Ramsey they are bound together for the safety of his dream home in "Angel's Cove" in California she boards a train with him...only to be turned straight over to Clark, who intends to have her committed to an insane asylum.

She breaks free, and is chased down on the platform at the next stop by a man...Ramsey, who had caught a plane to overtake the train after finally putting the pieces together that she is in mortal danger.

Back in Raleigh, Deborah is able to connect with Monahan; she is her last hope. They arrange to meet, only to have Monahan kidnap her and drive her straight to the mill in Clarksville and right into Clark's murderous arms.

He chases Deborah around the factory, up onto its catwalks, seeking to throw her to her death the same way he had her father. Monahan follows. In the darkness, Clark mistakes her for Deborah and sends her plummeting instead. Ramsey bursts in, and launches into a life-or-death struggle with Clark high on a ledge. Shocked to see Deborah still alive, Clark backpedals off the catwalk in a daze.

Deborah and Keith drive arm in arm down the winding road to sparkling Angel's Cove. Married already for three months, they beam. Deborah has a surprise, and whispers it in Keith's ear. He is delighted to learn that they will soon be expanding their family.

== Cast ==
- Ida Lupino as Deborah Chandler Clark
- Stephen McNally as Selden Clark
- Howard Duff as Keith Ramsey
- Peggy Dow as Patricia Monahan
- John Litel as John Chandler
- Taylor Holmes as Lucius Maury
- Irving Bacon as Link
- Don Beddoe as Fat Salesman
- Joe Besser as Salesman with Drum

== Reception ==
Bosley Crowther, in The New York Times, gave the film a mostly positive review. He wrote, "Although it never pretends to be anything but melodrama, Woman in Hiding, unlike so many offerings in this genre, adds some convincing characterizations to its suspense. The combination of the two attributes succeeds in raising this new arrival at the Criterion a notch or two above the normal in this category emanating from the Coast. And, aside from a climax which is something less than inspired, Michael Gordon's direction of this story of a newlywed's desperate flight from her homicidal husband is paced toward mounting tension despite some implausible aspects here and there."

The Chicago Tribune was complimentary overall: "With a little tightening at the joints and a little cutting here and there, this film could have been a first rate thriller—and, even as it is, there are some well acted and suspense-filled episodes. Ida Lupino is properly tiny and fragile....Steven McNally is handsome and forbidding as the ruthless killer....Howard Duff...plays knight errant and rescues the lady in the proverbial nick of time. Peggy Dow...does very well in her early scenes, but is inclined to overdo in the frantic finale. The climax is overly long, and the fadeout rather startlingly coy, but the film has some ingenious touches, and several amusing bits."

Film critic Dennis Schwartz wrote in 2019, "Patchy melodrama with too many contrived suspense escape scenes and too pat an ending to be anything better than a modest thriller, but Ida Lupino as the damsel-in-distress is terrific. Michael Gordon (Pillow Talk/Boys' Night Out/Cyrano de Bergerac) directs in a workmanlike and capable way."

Has been shown on the Turner Classic Movies show Noir Alley with Eddie Muller.
