= Jennifer (1953 film) =

1953 film

- Theatrical release poster
- Directed by: Joel Newton
- Screenplay by: Bernard Girard; Richard Dorso
- Based on: the Feb. 1949 Cosmopolitan short story "Jennifer" by Virginia Myers
- Produced by: Berman Swarttz
- Starring: Ida Lupino; Howard Duff; Robert Nichols; Mary Shipp
- Cinematography: James Wong Howe
- Edited by: Everett Douglas
- Music by: Ernest Gold
- Production company: Monogram Pictures
- Distributed by: Allied Artists Pictures
- Release date: October 25, 1953 (United States)
- Running time: 73 minutes
- Country: United States
- Language: English

Jennifer is a 1953 American film noir drama mystery film directed by Joel Newton and starring Ida Lupino, Howard Duff, and Robert Nichols. The film is notable for the introduction of the jazz standard "Angel Eyes," composed and performed by Matt Dennis.

== Plot ==
Down on her luck, Agnes Langley (Ida Lupino) is hired by Lorna Gale (Mary Shipp) to replace the "missing" Jennifer as caretaker for the Gale family's currently unoccupied Southern California estate. Agnes is immediately affected by the mysterious house and, after she finds a diary apparently belonging to Jennifer, becomes obsessed with determining the cause of the woman's "disappearance".

== Cast ==
- Ida Lupino as Agnes Langley
- Howard Duff as Jim Hollis
- Robert Nichols as Orin
- Mary Shipp as Lorna Gale
- Ned Glass as Grocery Clerk
- Kitty McHugh as Landlady
- Russ Conway as Gardener
- Lorna Thayer as Molly, Grocery Clerk
- Matt Dennis as himself

== Reception ==
Time Out magazine (London) writes of the film, "This is gothic romance crossed with early-'50s noir, worth a look for the sake of the great Wong Howe. Grey-listed and taking what work he could get, he tackles even this B-picture for Monogram with unfailing artistry, creating images that are strong without being showy, atmospheric yet perfectly naturalistic."
