= Mildred Ladner Thompson =

American journalist, writer and columnist

Mildred Ladner Thompson (June 24, 1918 – June 25, 2013) was an American journalist, writer, and columnist with The Wall Street Journal, where she became one of its first female reporters. She also worked as a reporter and columnist for the Associated Press and Tulsa World.

== Early life and education ==
Thompson was born Mildred Diefenderfer in Allentown, Pennsylvania, on June 24, 1918, the only child of Orlando and Mary Diefenderfer. She worked at an Allentown newspaper while completing her bachelor's degree at Moravian College. She received a master's degree in journalism from the University of Wisconsin–Madison.

== Career ==
In 1945, shortly after completing graduate school, she was hired by Associated Press, where she worked out of the Associated Press' Philadelphia bureau. While at Associated Press, she interviewed U.S. President Franklin D. Roosevelt and his wife, First Lady of the United States Eleanor Roosevelt.

Her work at Associated Press caught the attention of The Wall Street Journal, which hired her in 1945 as a reporter for its bureau in their Washington D.C. bureau, where she became one of the newspaper's first female reporters. She was the only woman on the staff of the WSJ at the time of her hiring. Her assignments included the Truman administration and the newspaper's aviation and transportation beats. In November 1947, Thompson flew to California, where she witnessed and covered the first, and only, flight of the Spruce Goose (Hughes H-4 Hercules), the prototype aircraft created by Howard Hughes.

In 1950, she relocated to Oklahoma, where she worked as an correspondent for several national publications. She also wrote for several Tulsa-based organizations, including the Tulsa Boys Home and Tulsa Ballet. She was hired by the Gilcrease Museum to write biographies of artists, including "O. C. Seltzer, Painter of the Old West" and "William de la Montagne Cary, Artist on the Missouri River," which were published by the University of Oklahoma. She also authored a history of the Tulsa City-County Library, "Tulsa City-County Library: 1912–1991," which was published in 1991.

In 1977, Thompson was hired by the Tulsa World as a book editor, columnist, and was highly involved with the Tulsa Press Club.

She lived in Tulsa for 45 years until 1995, when she moved to Sarasota, Florida with her second husband, T.K. Thompson. She continued to write biographies of new residents of her Florida retirement community.

== Personal life ==
Thompson met her first husband, the late John Ladner, a U.S. Navy commander from Tulsa, Oklahoma, while working in Washington, D.C. She and Ladner, who later became a Tulsa district judge, moved to Oklahoma shortly after their 1950 wedding.

== Death ==
Thompson died in Sarasota, Florida, on June 25, 2013, at age of 95. She was survived by her three children, Mary Pat Robertson, Helen Ladner, and Edward Ladner. She was widowed by both her first and second husbands, John Ladner, who died in 1983, and T. K. Thompson.
