= Girls in the Night =

1953 film by Jack Arnold

- Movie poster
- Directed by: Jack Arnold
- Screenplay by: Ray Buffum
- Produced by: Albert J. Cohen
- Starring: Harvey Lembeck; Joyce Holden; Glenda Farrell; Leonard Freeman
- Narrated by: Jeff Chandler
- Cinematography: Carl E. Guthrie
- Edited by: Paul Weatherwax
- Music by: Henry Mancini (uncredited); Herman Stein (uncredited)
- Color process: Black and white
- Production company: Universal Pictures
- Distributed by: Universal Pictures
- Release dates: January 15, 1953 (New York City); February 19, 1953 (Los Angeles)
- Running time: 83 minutes
- Country: United States
- Language: English

Girls in the Night is an American film noir directed by Jack Arnold. Released by Universal Pictures on January 15, 1953, the film stars Harvey Lembeck, Joyce Holden, and Glenda Farrell. The film revolves around a family whose efforts to move into a better neighborhood are suddenly hampered when their son is accused of killing a blind man.

== Plot ==
Hannah Haynes, a pretty girl who competes in a beauty contest, dreams of moving away from her New York slum neighborhood. Her older brother Chuck, who has a chance to land a new job on Long Island, is hit by a car and needs to recover first.

Hannah frustrates her boyfriend by agreeing to a date with a hoodlum named Irv Kellener, which causes a fight between the men and makes the evil schemer Vera Schroeder jealous. Chuck and his girlfriend Georgia, who does seductive dances to entice men to throw coins to her, become so desperate that they steal from a beggar who is pretending to be blind.

Anticipating their plot, Irv arrives there first but is caught by the beggar and shoots him. Vera hides the gun and provides an alibi. Chuck and Georgia later execute their plan and steal more than $600, unaware that their victim is dead. Vera blackmails them, demanding $2,000 to prevent her from snitching to the police.

The principals confront each other in a warehouse, where Irv kisses Hannah and infuriates Vera. The police arrive, Irv runs and he is accidentally electrocuted. Chuck and Georgia are set free after returning the stolen money.

== Cast ==
- Harvey Lembeck as Chuck Haynes
- Joyce Holden as Georgia Codray
- Glenda Farrell as Alice Haynes
- Leonard Freeman as Joe Spurgeon
- Patricia Hardy as Hannah Haynes
- Jaclynne Greene as Vera Schroeder
- Don Gordon as Irv Kellener
- Anthony Ross as Charlie Haynes
- Emile Meyer as Police Officer Kovacs (as Emile G. Meyer)
- Susan Odin as Hilda Haynes
- Tommy Farrell as Frankie (as Tommie Farrell)
- Paul E. Burns as 'Blind' Fred Minosa
- John Eldredge as Judge
- Alan Dexter as Police Lt. Meyers
- Charles Cane as McGinty
- Dolores Fuller as woman at sorority clubhouse party

== Reception ==
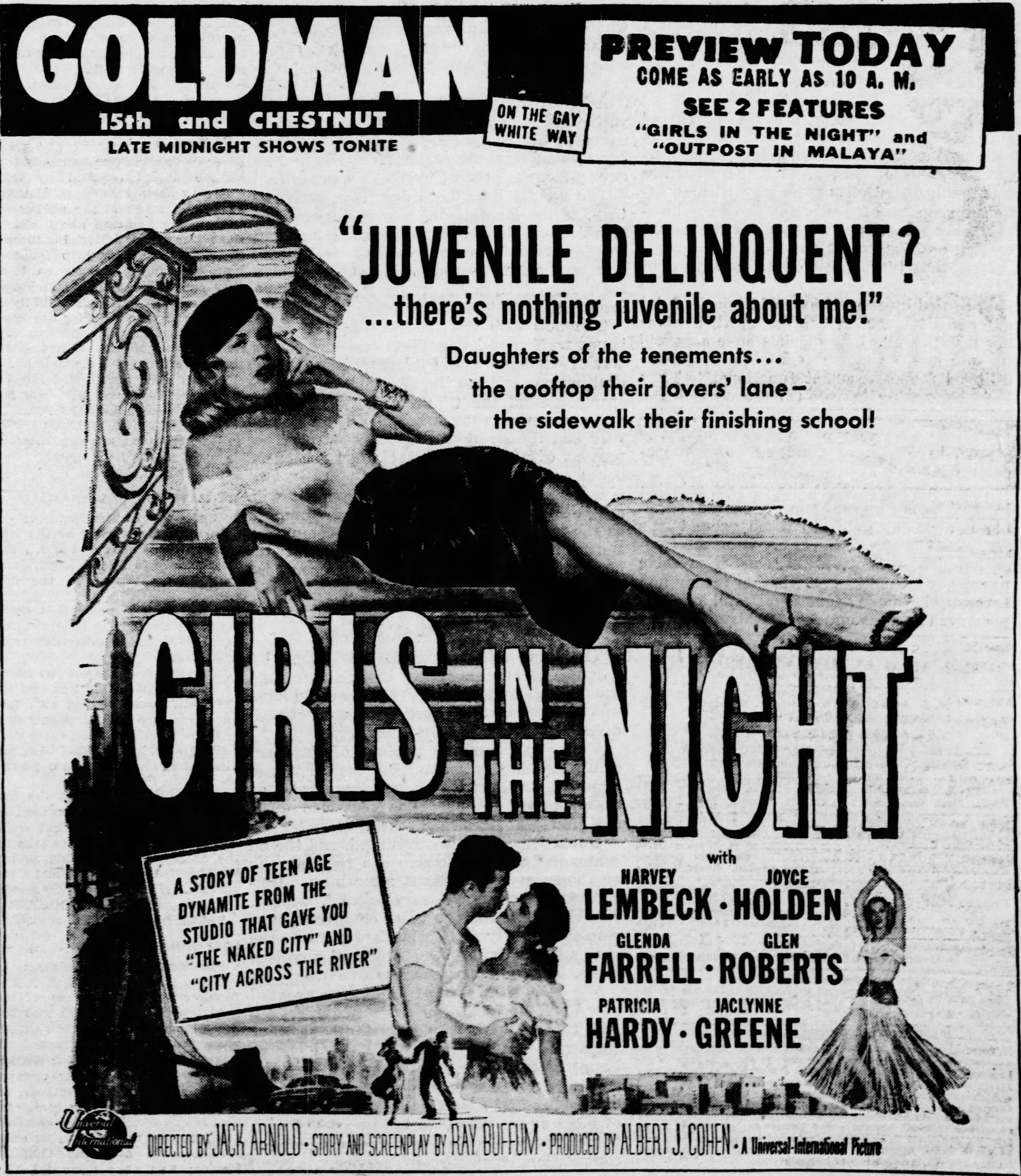
Theatrical advertisement from 1953

François Truffaut wrote that the film "leaves us in an intermediary state between surprise and delight," that "each scene [...] makes us think that it was the one that the author treated the most lovingly," and that "the directing of the actors (all newcomers) is perfect." Writing in AllMovie, critic Hal Erickson described the film as a "misleadingly titled [...] potboiler" in which "Glenda Farrell delivers the film's best performance." Critic Mike Bear wrote in Letterboxd that the film was an "unusual noir" that "combines juvenile delinquency, family values, yearning for a better life, murder, robbery, and blackmail [and] a homely girl they all call 'Ugly.'"
