= Robert Nichols (actor) =

American character actor, singer, and dancer

- Born: July 20, 1924; Oakland, California, U.S.
- Died: March 21, 2013 (aged 88); Occidental, California, U.S.
- Occupations: Actor; singer; dancer
- Years active: 1947–1993
- Spouse(s): Jennifer Nichols (1950–2013; his death; 2 children)

Robert Nichols (July 20, 1924 – March 21, 2013) was an American character actor, singer, and dancer. His television, theater and film career spanned more than seventy years.

== Life and career ==
Robert Nichols was born in Oakland, California, the son of Edna (née Beemer) and Ray D. Nichols, a real estate broker. He began his career in entertainment as a student at Oakland High School. Nichols enlisted with the U.S. Army during World War II, performing with the Special Services to entertain U.S. troops during the war. He performed on domestic U.S. military bases and managed a jazz band in Japan during the post-war period.

Nichols was awarded a scholarship for the Royal Academy of Dramatic Art, a drama school in London, following World War II. He began performing on in theater while living in London. In 1949, Nichols made his film debut in I Was a Male War Bride, which was shot in West Germany. He was deported from the United Kingdom soon after because he did not have a British work permit.

In 1950, soon after his deportation, Nichols met his future wife, Jennifer, at her 19th birthday beach party near Malibu, California. They became engaged after two dates and were married just two months later. Jennifer Nichols later worked as a film wardrobe supervisor.

Nichols worked in American film and television throughout the 1950s. In the episode "Doc Holliday Rewrites History" of The Life and Legend of Wyatt Earp, Nichols played a traveling photographer and historian.

Nichols returned to the United Kingdom around 1960, where he appeared in British and European film, television and theater productions. Nichols moved back to Los Angeles, California, in 1965. He soon relocated to New York City, where he enjoyed a steady career on and off Broadway, notably the Broadway productions of The Man Who Came to Dinner, Man and Superman and Take Me Along.

Nichols and his wife purchased property to build a home in Occidental, Sonoma County, California, in 1991. He continued to act and perform until the early 2000s. His last theater role was in the musical Ragtime, appearing in Los Angeles, Chicago and Vancouver.

Nichols died from heart failure at his Occidental home on March 21, 2013, at the age of 88.

== Filmography ==
1940	Little Men	Teddy	Notes
1949	I Was a Male War Bride	Motor Pool Mechanic	Uncredited
1951	The Thing from Another World	Lt. Ken MacPherson "Mac"	
1951	Father Takes the Air	Photographer	Uncredited
1951	The Red Badge of Courage	Fat Union Soldier	Uncredited
1951	Disk Jockey	Photographer	Uncredited
1951	The Blue Veil	Fred Begley, Jr.	Uncredited
1952	Red Skies of Montana	Felton	Uncredited
1952	Hold That Line	Harold Lane	
1952	Jet Job	Dynamo Jackson	
1952	The Pride of St. Louis	Eddie	Uncredited
1952	Sally and Saint Anne	Henry	Uncredited
1952	Dreamboat	Student	Uncredited
1952	Monkey Business	Garage Man	Uncredited
1952	Battle Zone	Marine	Uncredited
1952	Eight Iron Men	Walsh	
1953	Battle Circus	Pvt. Sommers	Uncredited
1953	Julius Caesar	Citizen of Rome	Uncredited
1953	Dream Wife	Elevator Boy	Uncredited
1953	Gentlemen Prefer Blondes	Evans	Uncredited
1953	Jennifer	Orin	
1954	The Command	2nd Lt. O'Hirons	
1954	Prisoner of War	Patrick Woodhope	Uncredited
1954	The Student Prince	Student at Duel	Uncredited
1954	Johnny Dark	Smitty	
1954	The Bob Mathias Story	Stanford Football Player	Uncredited
1954	The Atomic Kid	Bob	Uncredited
1955	Tight Spot	Boy Honeymooner	Uncredited
1955	This Island Earth	Joe Wilson	
1956	Navy Wife	Oscar	
1956	Hold Back the Night	Beany Smith	
1956	Giant	Mort 'Pinky' Snythe	
1957	Don't Go Near the Water	Lt. Cmdr. Hereford	
1957	Bombers B-52	Wilbur 'Brooklyn' Stuart	
1958	Imitation General	Soldier	Uncredited
1959	The 30 Foot Bride of Candy Rock	Bank Manager	
1962	Don't Bother to Knock	American Sailor	Uncredited
1962	The Amorous Prawn	Sam Goulansky	
1963	Follow the Boys	Hulldown	
1963	Come Fly with Me	Nickerson	Uncredited
1963	Call Me Bwana	American Major	
1963	The Victors	'The Squad' Member No. 5	2963 The Donna Reed Show as Mr. Moody in the Neighborly Gesture."
1963	Man in the Middle	Lt. Harvey Bender	
1964	The Yellow Rolls-Royce	American Travel Agent	Uncredited
1969	The Trouble with Girls	Smith	
1970	The Out-of-Towners	Man in Airplane	
1971	Escape from the Planet of the Apes	Reporter	Uncredited
1972	They Only Kill Their Masters	Doctor Peterson	
1972	Pete 'n' Tillie	Party Guest	Uncredited
1973	Wicked, Wicked	Fred, Day Clerk	
1973	Westworld	1st Male Interviewee	Uncredited
1975	The Night They Robbed Big Bertha's	Professor	
1976	God Told Me To	Fletcher	
1983	Reuben, Reuben	Harry Pycraft	
1984	Billions for Boris	Derelict	
1993	So I Married an Axe Murderer	Scottish Minister	(final film role)

== Discography ==
- Jerome Kern: Show Boat, conducted by John McGlinn, EMI, 1988
