= Bronco Buster (film) =

1952 film by Budd Boetticher

- Theatrical release poster
- Directed by: Budd Boetticher
- Screenplay by: Horace McCoy; Lillie Hayward
- Based on: Story by Peter B. Kyne
- Produced by: Ted Richmond
- Starring: John Lund; Scott Brady; Joyce Holden
- Cinematography: Clifford Stine
- Edited by: Edward Curtiss
- Color process: Technicolor
- Production company: Universal Pictures
- Distributed by: Universal Pictures
- Release date: May 1, 1952
- Running time: 81 minutes
- Country: United States
- Language: English

Bronco Buster is a 1952 American Western film directed by Budd Boetticher and starring John Lund, Scott Brady and Joyce Holden. It was produced and distributed by Universal Pictures.

== Plot ==
A veteran rodeo rider trains a young apprentice and later competes against him.

== Cast ==
- John Lund as Tom Moody
- Scott Brady as Bart Eaton
- Joyce Holden as Judy Bream
- Chill Wills as Dan Bream
- Don Haggerty as Dobie Carson
- Casey Tibbs as Rodeo Rider
- Pete Crump as Rodeo Rider
- Dan Poore as Dick Elliot
- Bill Williams as Rodeo Rider
- Jerry Ambler as Rodeo Rider

== See also ==
- List of American films of 1952
