= You Never Can Tell (1951 film) =

1951 film

- Directed by: Lou Breslow
- Screenplay by: Lou Breslow; David Chandler
- Story by: Lou Breslow
- Produced by: Leonard Goldstein
- Starring: Dick Powell; Peggy Dow; Joyce Holden
- Cinematography: Maury Gertsman
- Edited by: Frank Gross
- Music by: Hans J. Salter
- Color process: Black and white
- Production company: Universal International Pictures
- Distributed by: Universal Pictures
- Release date: 1951
- Running time: 78 minutes
- Country: United States
- Language: English

You Never Can Tell is 1951 American comedy film directed by Lou Breslow and starring Dick Powell, Peggy Dow and Joyce Holden. The film was loosely remade as Oh! Heavenly Dog (1980), starring Chevy Chase.

The film is unrelated to the George Bernard Shaw play or 1920 film of the same title.

== Plot ==
A German Shepherd named King inherits a fortune from his eccentric millionaire owner. If King dies, the fortune will pass to the late millionaire's secretary Ellen. Perry Collins visits Ellen, claiming to have rescued King following a jeep accident while in the army. However, Collins wants the fortune that Ellen will inherit on King's death. When King is found poisoned, his spirit asks Lion (the leader in the heaven for animals) to return him to earth to solve his own murder, and he takes the form of private investigator Rex Shepard. Lion also sends racehorse Golden Harvest back to earth as Goldie Harvey to help Rex. Goldie and Rex must solve the case before the full moon appears or they will have to remain on earth as humans.

== Cast ==
- Dick Powell as Rex Shepard
- Peggy Dow as Ellen Hathaway
- Joyce Holden as Golden Harvest / Goldie Harvey
- Charles Drake as Perry Collins
- Albert Sharpe as Grandpa Hathaway
- Lou Polan as Police Sergeant Novak
- Frank Nelson as Police Lieutenant Gilpin
- Will Vedder as Nicholas
- Frank Gerstle as Detective
- Ott George as Detective Lieutenant Louie Luisetti

== Reception ==
Critic Grace Kingsley of the Los Angeles Times called the film "the maddest, merriest animal picture ever made, one alight with imagination and bright whimsy".

== Bibliography ==
- Worley, Alec. Empires of the Imagination: A Critical Survey of Fantasy Cinema from Georges Melies to The Lord of the Rings. McFarland, 2005.
