= Tulsa City-County Library =

Public Library System in Northeast Oklahoma

Coordinates: 36.150291°N 95.994675°W

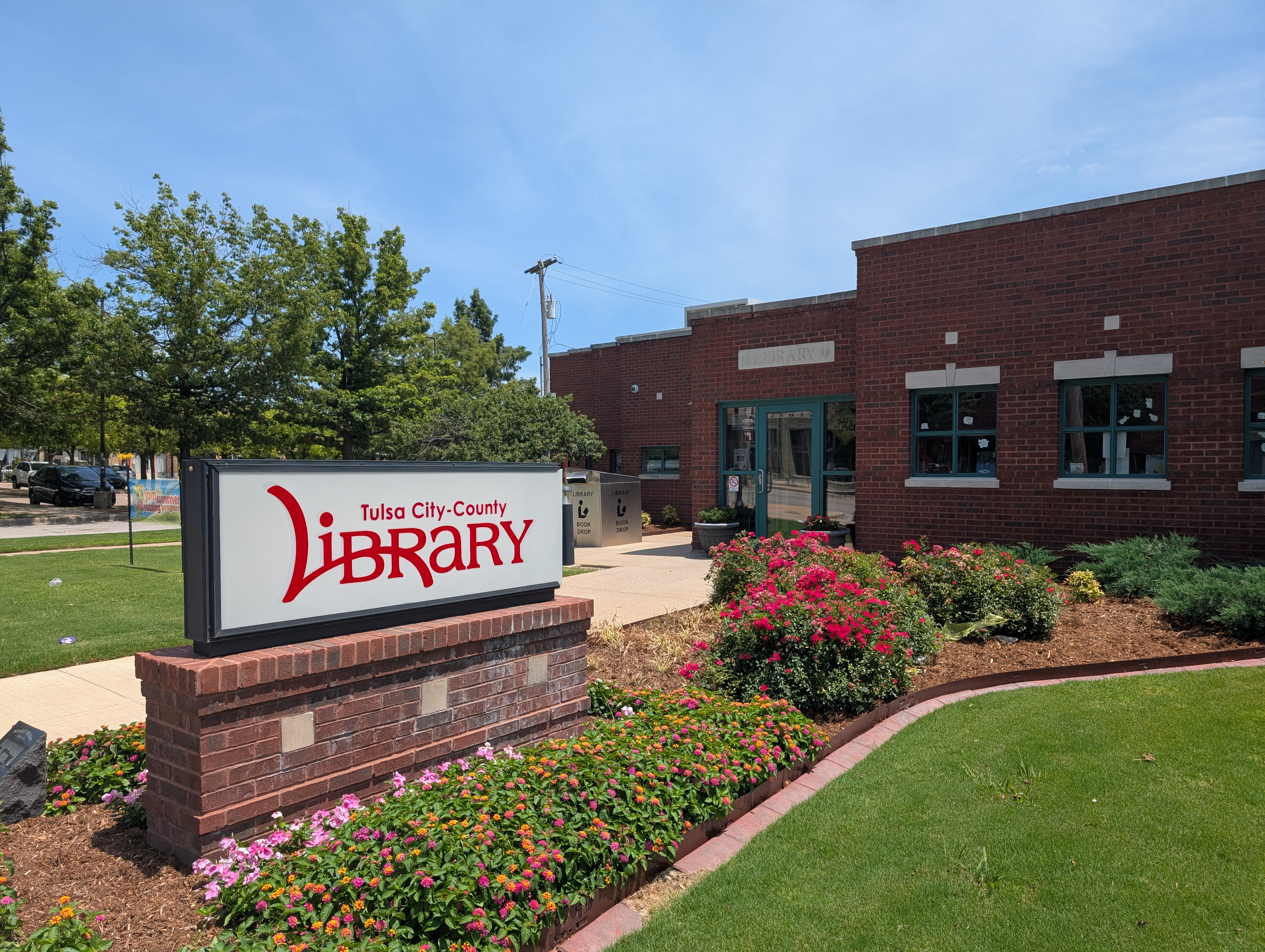
Tulsa City-County Library on S. Lewis Ave

The Tulsa City-County Library (TCCL) is the major public library system in Tulsa County, Oklahoma.

== Overview ==
The library system serves those who live, work, go to school in, own land in, or pay property taxes on land in Tulsa County. There are 24 branches in the system: Bixby, Broken Arrow, Bronson Brookside, Central, Charles Page, Collinsville, Glenpool, Hardesty Regional, Herman & Kate Kaiser, Jenks, Judy Z. Kishner, Kendall-Whittier, Martin Regional, Maxwell Park, Nathan Hale, Owasso, Peggy V. Helmerich, Pratt, Rudisill Regional, Schusterman-Benson, Skiatook, South Broken Arrow, Suburban Acres, and Zarrow Regional.

TCCL’s collection is composed of more than 1.7 million materials, including books, CDs, DVDs (in regular and Blu-ray formats), magazines, audio books, e-books and other formats. TCCL offers numerous services to the public including public use pcs and Wi-Fi at each library branch. The library system also has a bookmobile that delivers materials to any of the 24 branches at request. TCCL also offers homebound delivery, the Ruth G. Hardman Adult Literacy Service, meeting rooms, and reference support via telephone, email, instant messaging, text messaging, Facebook, and Twitter.

TCCL also maintains specialized collections in some of its library branches. The Rudisill Regional Library houses the African American Resource Center, the Zarrow Regional Library houses the American Indian Resource Center, the Martin Regional Library houses the Hispanic Resource Center, and Hardesty Regional Library houses the Genealogy Resource Center. The Central Library also features a Maker Space with a 3-D printing station and a recording studio; a children’s area with play stations and book bins for easy access; the Digital Literacy Lab; the Learning and Creativity Center; Children’s Garden.

TCCL was named as a “5 Star Library” by the publication “Library Journal” in their “2009 Index of Public Library Service.” The Library was once again named a "5 Star Library" in 2022.

The Rudisill Regional Library recently underwent a closing to move to a new location in the historic Greenwood District. The bookmobile will provide service to the region at the Suburban Acres Library.

== History ==
Public library service began in Tulsa County in the early 1900s. The first library was located in the basement of the Tulsa County courthouse. A Carnegie Library Grant for $12,500 was issued in 1904. The grant was raised to $42,500 in 1913 and to $55,000 in 1915. The original Carnegie Library in downtown Tulsa was demolished in 1965.

It wasn’t until the 1960s that what is today known as Tulsa City-County Library was born. On November 14, 1961, an election was held in Tulsa County to approve “the expenditure of $3.8 million to construct a new Central Library and three branches, plus a 1.9-mill annual levy for funding the system.” Tulsa voters approved “a countywide system to consolidate metropolitan and suburban libraries the following fiscal year”. The Tulsa City-County Library Commission “officially assumed control of the Library System on July 1, 1962, when the 1.9-mill levy went into effect”. “To be absorbed into the consolidated system were the Broken Arrow Library, founded by the Self Culture Club in 1906 but operated by the city since 1929; the Collinsville Library, created by the Comedy of Errors Club in 1913 and converted into a Carnegie library in 1917; a library in Skiatook opened with WPA funds and operated by the City of Skiatook; and Page Memorial Library of Sand Springs”.

By 1963, there were 16 libraries operating within the system. In 1975-76, four new libraries were opened while a fifth was completed: The North Regional Library, the Jenks Library, the Pratt Library, the Skiatook Library, and the Martin Regional Library. On August 22, 1978, voters approved State Question 507 to enable an increase in the mill levy. A bond passed on May 12, 1998, that allowed TCCL to expand 11 library branches, replace two, and renovate another eight. Today the system consists of a Central Library, four regional libraries, 19 branches, a genealogy center, a bookmobile and homebound delivery service, and a services center.

Mildred Ladner Thompson, a writer and columnist for the Tulsa World, authored a history of the public library, "Tulsa City-County Library: 1912-1991," released in 1991.

John Wooley, a writer and retired columnist for the Tulsa World, authored an updated history of the public library, "Tulsa City-County Library: 1992-2021: A Legacy of Innovation, Integration, Inspiration," released in 2023.

In 2014, TCCL began publishing the Tulsa Book Review, a monthly publication distributed around the city and through the branch libraries. Tulsa Book Review is licensed from City Book Review.

The Central Library of the Tulsa City-County Library became one of six libraries in North America to be honored with the 2019 New Landmark Library designation from Library Journal.

== Literary awards ==
The Tulsa Library Trust, a privately funded public foundation, supports the Tulsa City-County Library. Among other activities, it gives out multiple literary awards.

=== Peggy V. Helmerich Distinguished Author Award ===
The Peggy V. Helmerich Distinguished Author Award has been awarded since 1985 to an "internationally acclaimed" author who has "written a distinguished body of work and made a major contribution to the field of literature and letters." The Helmerich Award consists of a US$40,000 cash prize and an engraved crystal book.

Past winners of the award are:

- 2026 Colson Whitehead
- 2025 Hernan Diaz
- 2024 H.W. Brands
- 2023 Amor Towles
- 2022 Ann Patchett
- 2021 Not awarded
- 2020 Marilynne Robinson
- 2019 Stacy Schiff
- 2018 Hilary Mantel
- 2017 Richard Ford
- 2016 Billy Collins
- 2015 Rick Atkinson
- 2014 Ann Patchett
- 2013 Kazuo Ishiguro
- 2012 Wendell Berry
- 2011 Alan Furst
- 2010 Ian McEwan
- 2009 Geraldine Brooks
- 2008 Michael Chabon
- 2007 Thomas Keneally
- 2006 Mark Helprin
- 2005 John Grisham
- 2004 David McCullough
- 2003 Shelby Foote
- 2002 Joyce Carol Oates
- 2001 William Kennedy
- 2000 William Manchester
- 1999 Margaret Atwood
- 1998 E. L. Doctorow
- 1997 John Hope Franklin
- 1996 Neil Simon
- 1995 David McCullough
- 1994 Ray Bradbury
- 1993 Peter Matthiessen
- 1992 Norman Mailer
- 1991 Eudora Welty
- 1990 John le Carré
- 1989 Saul Bellow
- 1988 Toni Morrison
- 1987 John Updike
- 1986 Larry McMurtry
- 1985 Norman Cousins

=== Anne V. Zarrow Award for Young Readers' Literature ===
The Anne V. Zarrow Award for Young Readers' Literature has been awarded since 1991 to "nationally acclaimed authors who have made a significant contribution to the field of literature for children and young adults." The award consists of a US$7,500 cash prize and an engraved crystal book.

Winners of the award are:

- 2026 Ruta Sepetys
- 2025 Kwame Alexander
- 2024 Raina Telgemeier
- 2023 Steve Sheinkin
- 2022 Nikki Grimes
- 2021 Jason Reynolds
- 2020 Katherine Applegate
- 2019 Rita Williams-Garcia
- 2018 Pam Muñoz Ryan
- 2017 Laurie Halse Anderson
- 2016 Gordon Korman
- 2015 Sharon Draper
- 2014 Jack Gantos
- 2013 Jim Murphy
- 2012 Jacqueline Woodson
- 2011 Kathryn Lasky
- 2010 Phyllis Reynolds Naylor
- 2009 Christopher Paul Curtis
- 2008 Louis Sachar
- 2007 Kate DiCamillo
- 2006 Sharon Creech
- 2005 Avi
- 2004 Susan Cooper
- 2003 Russell Freedman
- 2002 Richard Peck
- 2001 E.L. Konigsburg
- 2000 Jerry Spinelli
- 1999 Jane Yolen
- 1998 Cynthia Voigt
- 1997 Gary Paulsen
- 1996 Walter Dean Myers
- 1995 not awarded
- 1994 Lois Lowry
- 1993 Katherine Paterson
- 1992 Madeleine L’Engle
- 1991 S.E. Hinton

=== American Indian Festival of Words Writers Award ===
Inaugurated in 2001, the American Indian Festival of Words Writers Award recognizes literary contributions of outstanding American Indian authors. It is the first and only award given by a public library to honor an American Indian author. The award is given by the Tulsa Library Trust and Tulsa Library's American Indian Resource Center in odd-numbered years. Recipients receive a US$5,000 cash prize and an engraved crystal.

Winners of the award are:

- 2025 Brandon Hobson
- 2023 Stephen Graham Jones
- 2021 Tommy Orange
- 2019 Laura Tohe
- 2017 Tim Tingle
- 2015 Joseph Bruchac
- 2013 Sterlin Harjo
- 2011 LeAnne Howe
- 2009 not awarded
- 2007 Carter Revard
- 2005 Leslie Marmon Silko
- 2003 Vine Deloria, Jr.
- 2001 Joy Harjo

=== American Indian Circle of Honor Award ===
Inaugurated in 2004, the American Indian Circle of Honor Award honors an American Indian for his/her achievements and contributions that have enriched the lives of others. Induction into the Circle of Honor is a celebration of the honoree’s actions in the face of adversity, commitment to the preservation of American Indian culture and legacy for future generations. The award is given by the Tulsa Library Trust and Tulsa Library's American Indian Resource Center in even-numbered years. Recipients receive a US$5,000 cash prize and specially designed trophy.

Past winners of the award are:

- 2026 Greg Bigler
- 2024 John Herrington
- 2022 Archie Mason
- 2020 Walter Echo-Hawk
- 2018 Henrietta Mann
- 2016 Sam Proctor
- 2014 Ruthe Blalock Jones
- 2012 Kirke Kickingbird
- 2010 Billy Mills
- 2008 Neal McCaleb
- 2006 Wilma Mankiller
- 2004 Charles Chibitty

=== Sankofa Freedom Award ===
The Sankofa Freedom Award is presented by the Tulsa Library Trust and Tulsa Library's African-American Resource Center. Sankofa is a word from the Akan language, which is spoken in southern Ghana. Literally translated, sankofa means: “We must go back and reclaim our past so we can move forward; so we understand why and how we came to be who we are today.” The Sankofa Freedom Award consists of a US $7,000 cash prize and an engraved medallion. It is awarded in even-numbered years (usually in February during Black History Month) to a nationally acclaimed individual who has dedicated his or her life to educating improving the greater African-American community.

Past winners of the award are:

- 2024 Terry McMillan
- 2022 Walter Mosley
- 2020 Anita Hill
- 2018 Iyanla Vanzant
- 2016 Tavis Smiley
- 2014 Susan L. Taylor
- 2012 Hill Harper
- 2010 Pearl Cleage
- 2008 Nikki Giovanni
- 2006 Michael Eric Dyson

== One Book, One Tulsa ==
One Book, One Tulsa is held annually. The Tulsa City County Library chooses one book and encourages residents of Tulsa to read the book. There is a book panel held, usually headed by the author. The goal is to bring the Tulsa community together as well as foster literacy within the broader Tulsa community and encourage meaningful conversations about the selected book.

- 2026 The Lion Women of Tehran by Marjan Kamali
- 2025 This Great Hemisphere by Mateo Askaripour
- 2024 Calling for a Blanket Dance by Oscar Hokeah
- 2023 Crying in H Mart by Michelle Zauner
- 2022 Circe by Madeline Miller
- 2021 Mexican Gothic by Silvia Moreno-Garcia
- 2020 Red at the Bone by Jacqueline Woodson
- 2019 All You Can Ever Know by Nicole Chung
- 2018 Killers of the Flower Moon by David Grann
- 2017 not awarded
- 2016 The Soloist by Steve Lopez
- 2015 The Warmth of Other Suns by Isabel Wilkerson
- 2014 The Great Gatsby by F. Scott Fitzgerald
- 2013 House of Earth by Woody Guthrie
- 2012 Hannah Coulter by Wendell Berry
