= Howard Duff =

American actor (1913–1990)

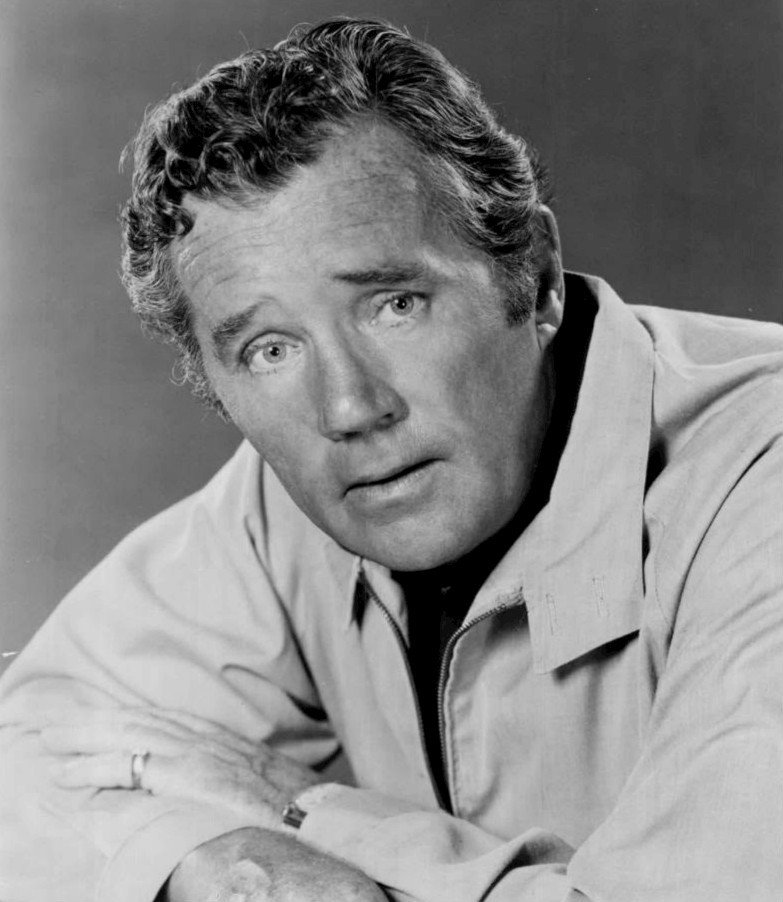
- Duff in 1969
- Born: Howard Green Duff; November 24, 1913; Charleston, Washington, U.S.
- Died: July 8, 1990 (aged 76); Santa Barbara, California, U.S.
- Occupation: Actor
- Years active: 1943–1990
- Spouses: Ida Lupino (m. 1951; div. 1984) Judy Jenkinson (m. 1986)
- Children: 1

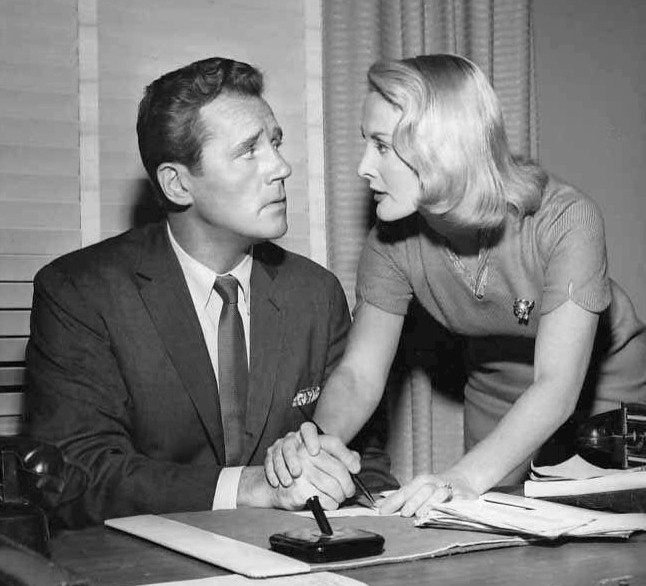
Duff and Eileen Ryan in "A World of Difference", an episode of The Twilight Zone, 1960

Howard Green Duff (November 24, 1913 – July 8, 1990) was an American actor. He started in radio during World War II before appearing in many Hollywood features and television programs from 1947 to 1990. He also directed for television. His career was marked by accusations of disloyalty during the red scare of the 1950s.

== Early life ==
Duff was born in Charleston, Washington (today a part of Bremerton), in 1913. He graduated from Roosevelt High School in Seattle in 1932, where he began acting in school plays after he was cut from the school basketball team.

Duff worked locally in Seattle-area theater until entering the United States Army Air Corps during World War II. He was eventually assigned to their radio service, and announced re-broadcasts prepared for the Armed Forces Radio Service (AFRS). In this role, he served as the announcer for the drama Suspense, dated March 16, 1943.

== Career ==
=== Sam Spade ===
Duff's most memorable radio role was as Dashiell Hammett's private eye Sam Spade in The Adventures of Sam Spade (1946–1950). Due to accusations of Duff being a communist and with his TV and film career starting to take hold, he ultimately left the program in 1950 at the start of its final season; Stephen Dunne took over the voice role of Spade.

=== Contract with Universal ===
Duff was signed to a long-term contract with Universal, and made his film debut alongside Burt Lancaster as an inmate in 1947's Brute Force. The movie was produced by Mark Hellinger and directed by Jules Dassin, who gave Duff a bigger role in their next film, The Naked City (1948). He subsequently reunited with Lancaster for the family drama All My Sons (also 1948), based on the play of the same name by Arthur Miller.

More substantial roles soon followed, with Duff taking the lead in numerous Westerns and films noir including Illegal Entry, Red Canyon, Johnny Stool Pigeon, Calamity Jane and Sam Bass (all 1949); Spy Hunt, Shakedown and Woman in Hiding (all 1950). The last-named film saw Duff act alongside his future wife Ida Lupino; the couple would subsequently co-star in a further four films during the 1950s.

In 1951, Duff made a pilot for a new radio series, The McCoy. Following his marriage to Lupino in October 1951, Duff was granted a release from his contract with Universal.

=== Freelance actor ===
Duff appeared in the 1952 film That Kind of Girl (aka Models Inc), and also featured in Spaceways, and Roar of the Crowd (both 1953), the latter for Monogram Pictures, which ultimately made Jennifer (also 1953), the second movie in which he starred alongside his wife.

His other film appearances beside his wife; Don Siegel's Private Hell 36 (1954); Lewis Seiler's Women's Prison (1955), and Fritz Lang's While the City Sleeps (1956) continued Duff's successful run of movies during the 1950s.

=== Television ===
In addition to his movie roles, Duff also experienced success in television, with appearances in the 1950s series The Star and the Story, Climax! and Crossroads. From January 1957 to July 1958, he appeared with Lupino in the CBS sitcom Mr. Adams and Eve, which revolved around the private lives of two fictitious film stars, Howard Adams and Eve Drake, who were married to each other. They also served as producers.

Other TV roles included an appearance in NBC's Western series Bonanza, playing a young Samuel Langhorne Clemens in his early life in the West as a satirical and crusading journalist, in the first-season episode "Enter Mark Twain". Duff also featured in episodes of numerous TV series during the 1960s including The Twilight Zone, Burke's Law, Combat! (episode “Missing in Action”), The Eleventh Hour, Mr. Novak and Batman (episode "The Entrancing Dr. Cassandra", alongside wife Ida Lupino). In 1960, Duff portrayed Arthur Curtis on The Twilight Zone in an episode titled “A World of Difference.” In 1963 Duff appeared as Ed Frazer on The Virginian in the episode titled "A Distant Fury."

Duff had the lead role in the short-lived TV series Dante (which ran for only one season; 1960–61), but found greater success as Detective Sergeant Sam Stone in the ABC police drama Felony Squad (1966–69). Duff appeared in all 73 episodes of the series during its three-season run, alongside his co-stars Dennis Cole and Ben Alexander. He also directed one episode; "The Deadly Abductors".

Duff also directed seven episodes of the 1965–1966 television sitcom Camp Runamuck.

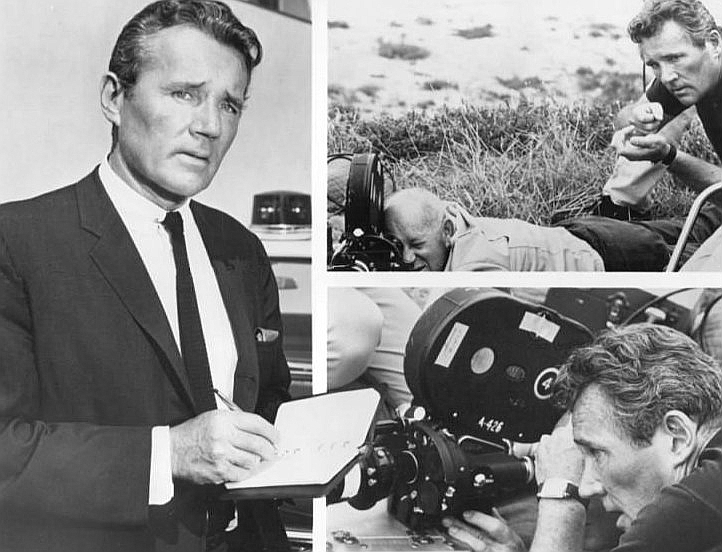
Publicity photo of Howard Duff, working in front of the camera and behind the scenes, for the television program Felony Squad

=== Later career ===
Duff continued to make guest appearances in TV series during the 1970s including The Streets of San Francisco, Police Story, The Rockford Files, and $weepstake$, amongst others, and also featured in the TV movies A Little Game (1971) and Snatched (1973). In 1971 Duff appeared as Stuart Masters in The Men from Shiloh (the retitled final season of the TV Western The Virginian) in the episode titled "The Town Killer".

Duff was part of an ensemble cast in the 1978 comedy film A Wedding, and had a prominent role as the attorney to Dustin Hoffman's character in the Academy Award-winning Kramer vs. Kramer (1979). In 1980 he played Charles Slade in the 1980 mini series The Dream Merchants.

Duff portrayed villain Jules Edwards in Part 1 of the 1981 mini-series East of Eden, and was part of the main cast in the TV series Flamingo Road (1980–82), appearing in all 38 episodes of the show.

He continued to make guest appearances in TV series during the 1980s, including Charlie's Angels (1980) (as bumbling private eye Harrigan in the episode "Harrigan's Angel"); Murder, She Wrote (1984); Magnum, P.I. (1988) (as Capt. Thomas Magnum, II, the grandfather of main character Thomas Magnum, played by Tom Selleck); and Dallas (also 1988). Duff also had a recurring role as Paul Galveston during the sixth season of Knots Landing (1984–85), appearing in 10 episodes. He returned for one more episode in 1990.

Although Duff made few film appearances during the 1980s, he did have a prominent role in the 1987 thriller No Way Out, alongside Kevin Costner and Gene Hackman. In 1990, shortly before his death, Duff made his final acting appearances in the TV series Midnight Caller and The Golden Girls, and the film Too Much Sun.

== Personal life ==
Duff had a tempestuous relationship with actress Ava Gardner in the late 1940s. In October 1951, he married Ida Lupino.

After he was listed in Red Channels as a communist subversive in 1950, he lost his radio work and might have forfeited his entire career had it not been for his marriage. Duff and Lupino had a daughter, Bridget Duff (born April 23, 1952). The couple separated in 1966 but did not divorce until 1984. He subsequently married Judy Jenkinson. Like former wife Lupino, Duff was a staunch Democrat.

=== Death ===
Duff died at age 76 of a heart attack on July 8, 1990, in Santa Barbara, California.

== Filmography ==
- Brute Force (1947) .... Robert "Soldier" Becker
- The Naked City (1948) .... Frank Niles
- All My Sons (1948) .... George Deever
- The Life of Riley (1949) .... Sam Spade on Radio Show (voice, uncredited)
- Red Canyon (1949) .... Lin Sloane
- Illegal Entry (1949) .... Bert Powers
- Calamity Jane and Sam Bass (1949) .... Sam Bass
- Johnny Stool Pigeon (1949) .... George Morton
- Woman in Hiding (1950, co-starring with Lupino) .... Keith Ramsey
- Spy Hunt (1950) .... Steve Quain
- Shakedown (1950) .... Jack Early
- The Lady from Texas (1951) .... Dan Mason
- Steel Town (1952) .... Jim Denko
- Models Inc. (1952) .... Lennie Stone
- Roar of the Crowd (1953) .... Johnny Tracy
- Spaceways (1953) .... Dr. Stephen Mitchell
- Jennifer (1953, co-starring with Lupino) .... Jim Hollis
- Tanganyika (1954) .... Dan Harder McCracken
- Private Hell 36 (1954, co-starring with Lupino) .... Jack Farnham
- The Yellow Mountain (1954) .... Pete Menlo
- Women's Prison (1955, starring Lupino) .... Dr. Crane
- Flame of the Islands (1956) .... Doug Duryea
- Blackjack Ketchum, Desperado (1956) .... Tom 'Blackjack' Ketchum
- While the City Sleeps (1956, starring Lupino) .... Lt. Burt Kaufman
- The Broken Star (1956) .... Deputy Marshal Frank Smeed
- Sierra Stranger (1957) .... Jess Collins
- Teenage Idol (1958 TV movie)
- The Lucy-Desi Comedy Hour (1959) "Lucy's Summer Vacation" appeared as himself, also with wife, Ida Lupino
- The Twilight Zone (1960) "A World of Difference" Gerry Raigan & Arthur Curtis
- The Alfred Hitchcock Hour (1962) (Season 1 Episode 14: "The Tender Poisoner") .... Peter Harding
- Combat! (1962) (Season 1 Episode 6: “Missing in Action”)
- Boys' Night Out (1962) .... Doug Jackson
- War Gods of Babylon (1962) .... Sardanapalo
- Calhoun: County Agent (1964, TV Movie) .... Sid Rayner
- The Changing Geometry of Flight (1965, Short) .... Narrator (voice)
- Panic in the City (1968) .... Dave Pomeroy
- D.A.: Murder One (1969, TV Movie) .... Lynn D. Compton
- In Search of America (1971, TV Movie) .... Ray Chandler
- A Little Game (1971, TV Movie) .... Dunlap
- The Heist (1972, TV Movie) .... Lieutenant Nicholson
- Snatched (1973, TV Movie) .... Duncan Wood
- The Late Show (1977) .... Harry Regan
- In the Glitter Palace (1977, TV Movie) .... Raymond Dawson Travers
- Actor (1978, TV Movie) .... Winfield Sheehan
- Ski Lift to Death (1978, TV Movie) .... Ben Forbes
- A Wedding (1978) .... Dr. Jules Meecham
- Battered (1978 TV movie) .... Bill Thompson
- Kramer vs. Kramer (1979) .... John Shaunessy
- Valentine Magic on Love Island (1980, TV Movie) .... A. J. Morgan
- Deadly Companion (1980) .... Lester Harlen
- Oh, God! Book II (1980) .... Dr. Benjamin Charles Whitley
- The Wild Women of Chastity Gulch (1982, TV Movie) .... Colonel Samuel Isaacs
- This Girl for Hire (1983, TV Movie) .... Wolfe Macready
- Murder, She Wrote (1984, Season 1 Episode 3) ....Ralph/Stephen Earl
- Love on the Run (1985, TV Movie) .... Lionel Rockland
- Scarecrow and Mrs. King (1985, 1987) (Season 3 Episode 4: "Tail of the Dancing Weasel"; Season 4 Episode 22: "The Khrushchev List") .... Harry V. Thornton
- Monster in the Closet (1986) .... Father Finnegan
- Roses Are for the Rich (1987, TV Movie) .... Denton
- No Way Out (1987) .... Senator Billy Duvall
- The Ed Begley Jr. Show (1989, TV Movie) .... Councilman Slaney
- Settle the Score (1989, TV Movie) .... Cy Whately
- Too Much Sun (1990) .... O.M. (final film role)
