= Richard West (outlaw) =

19th-century outlaw of the American Old West

- Born: December 31, 1860; Fort Worth, Texas, U.S.
- Died: April 13, 1898 (aged 37); Logan County, Oklahoma, U.S.
- Cause of death: Gunshot wound
- Resting place: Summit View Cemetery, Guthrie, Logan County, Oklahoma, U.S.
- Height: 5'1

Richard "Little Dick" West (December 31, 1860 – April 13, 1898) was an American outlaw of the Old West, and a member of Bill Doolin's gang.

== Early life and background ==
West was born in Texas, supposedly in 1860. He was working as a cowboy on the Halsell Ranch in Oklahoma Territory when he first met Bill Doolin in 1892. He was shot during a gunfight while riding with the Doolin-Dalton Gang as they were committing a bank robbery in Southwest City, Missouri. He remained with the gang through 1896, when Doolin was killed in Oklahoma Territory by Deputy U.S. Marshals Heck Thomas and Bill Tilghman. Deputy U.S. Marshals Heck Thomas, Bill Tilghman and Chris Madsen continued pursuing the gang until they systematically eliminated the rest of the gang over the course of the 1890s; leading to their nickname, the Three Guardsmen.

== Disappearance and death ==
After the gang split apart, they were still being pursued by the lawmen. West helped to form the Jennings Gang. With lawyers turned outlaws Al Jennings and his brother Frank, the gang made a number of bungled train robberies. After failing miserably, the gang split apart, with the other four members being captured and sentenced to jail in 1897, but West eluded capture. Deputy U.S. Marshal Madsen eventually tracked West to Guthrie, Oklahoma Territory, where a shootout ensued, during which West was killed. He is buried in Guthrie at the Summit View Cemetery. Other members of the Doolin-Dalton Gang met similar fates in Oklahoma.
