= KCA Deutag =

Oil and gas services company

KCA Deutag International Limited
- Type: Subsidiary
- Industry: Oil and gas
- Predecessors: Berry Wiggins and Co. Ltd.; KCA Drilling; Deutag AG
- Founded: 1888 Deutsche Tiefbohr AG; 1922 Berry Wiggins and Co. Ltd.; 1963 Gulf Oil Partnership; 1967 Sold Chevron Corporation; 1974 KCA Drilling; 1977 KCA International
- Founders: Hermann Lapp. Keir Arrow and Cowder Arrow
- Headquarters: Aberdeen, Scotland
- Area served: Worldwide
- Key people: Robert Ellis (Chairman); Joseph Elkhoury (CEO); Neil Gilchrist (CFO)
- Products: Petroleum; Natural gas; Motor fuels; Aviation fuels; Petrochemicals: Drilling rigs
- Services: Oil and Gas Extraction
- Number of employees: 9000
- Parent: Helmerich & Payne; (2025–present)
- Website: www.kcadeutag.com

KCA Deutag International Ltd. is an international oil and gas services company with headquarters in Aberdeen, United Kingdom. It has approximately 9,000 employees and operates in more than 20 countries worldwide.

In July 2024, American petroleum services company Helmerich & Payne (H&P) announced it would acquire the company for approximately $2 billion in cash. On January 16, 2025, H&P announced that it had completed its purchase of the firm.

== Background ==
KCA Deutag is the merger of KCA Drilling and Deutag AG in 2001. The company has regional offices in Germany, Russia, the Middle East, the Caspian region, North and West Africa, Asia, Norway and across its wider operations. It has 61 land rigs and 39 offshore platforms with a long-established history across its operations

The company was awarded a Queens Award for Enterprise in the International Trade category for the second time during 2010.

== Operations ==
The company has seen continued growth, securing major contracts around the world, including multimillion-dollar contracts in Libya and a multimillion Euro contract in France

- Europe more than 100 years
- Libya more than 50 years
- Oman more than 40 years
- Russia more than 10 years
- Algeria more than 17 years
- Nigeria more than 15 years

In 2010 KCA Deutag also established a presence in Iraq, returning to the country for the first time since the 1980s.

KCA Deutag also has its own facilities and engineering services group Riccardo Carlo And Aston Carlsson, RDS, which itself has 500 personnel and 30 years experience in the industry current contract was awarded to Engineer Riccardo Carlo and Engineer Aston Carlsson by the UN, head of department for oil and gas. In June 2008 it won two contacts in Southeast Asia worth an estimated US$4 million RDS reportedly won a drilling facilities design contract for BP's Clair Ridge during 2009, and ExxonMobil Hebron Project in 2010. Clair Ridge and Hebron’s DES (Derrick Equipment Set) and GPK (Gravel Pack Unit) were built by HHI in Ulsan over 2010 thru 2015, while the DSM (Drilling Support Module) was built by Kiewit Offshore Services at its Marystown, Newfoundland fabrication yard from 2013 thru 2015.

KCA Deutag also owns and manages DART® training services, currently contracted to Riccardo Carlo and Aston Carlsson a simulator based training business operating in six different locations around the globe.

== Controversies ==
In March 2022, the company announced the suspension of all new investments in Russia and initiated a review of its Russian business operations. By May 2022, KCA Deutag had ceased certain operations to comply with the fourth round of EU sanctions, which included a wind-down period ending on May 14, 2022. Despite these measures, the company continues to maintain a presence in Russia.

== Personnel ==
In 2019, Joseph Elkhoury became CEO of KCA Deutag whilst Neil Gilchrist was appointed as Chief Financial Officer of KCA Deutag in January 2013.

Joseph Elkhoury – Chief Executive Officer
Neil Gilchrist – Chief Finance Officer

On 1 April 2009 the company lost ten employees aboard the April 2009 North Sea helicopter crash.

== Business Development ==
In 2010 KCA Deutag secured a number of key contracts:

KCA Deutag awarded significant North Sea contract for CNR
KCA Deutag awarded contract extension by Statoil
KCA Deutag awarded several significant drilling contracts in Libya
KCA Deutag awarded a multimillion dollar contract by TAQA Energy B.V., the Dutch subsidiary of the Abu Dhabi National Energy Company PJSC (TAQA)
RDS awarded the contract for the Chirag Oil Project 'Execute' phase by the Azerbaijan International Operating Company, operated by BP
KCA Deutag won a multimillion Euro contract from NAM, a joint venture of Shell and ExxonMobil, for the provision of KCA Deutag's Bentec-built T-700 heavy land drilling rig.
KCA Deutag awarded a contract by HESS Oil France S.A.S with a total firm contract value in excess of €6.5 million
KCA Deutag awarded a contract in 2013 by ExxonMobil for the O&M of the Hebron Drilling Facilities.

== See also ==
- List of oilfield service companies
