= Walter Helmerich II =

American oil businessman

Walter Hugo Helmerich II (1895–1981) was an American oil businessman, and the co-founder of Helmerich & Payne.

He was born in Chicago in 1895. He started as a barnstormer. In the First World War, Helmerich joined the aviation section of the Army Signals Corps as a Lieutenant, became a pilot and, at one time was the world flight altitude record holder.

He married Cadijah Colcord, daughter of Charles Francis Colcord. Their son was Walter Helmerich III.

He died in Tulsa, Oklahoma in 1981.
