= Lou Breslow =

American screenwriter (1900–1987)

- Born: Lewis Breslow; July 18, 1900; Boston, Massachusetts
- Died: November 10, 1987 (aged 87); Los Angeles, California
- Other name: Louis Breslow
- Occupations: Screenwriter; Film director
- Years active: 1920–1961
- Spouse(s): Marion Byron (1932–1985; her death); 2 children

Lou Breslow (born Lewis Breslow; July 18, 1900 – November 10, 1987) was an American screenwriter and film director. He wrote for 70 films between 1928 and 1955. He also directed seven films between 1932 and 1951 and wrote scripts for both Laurel and Hardy in their first two films at 20th Century Fox, and Abbott and Costello.

Breslow married film actress and comedian Marion Byron in 1932, and remained married until her death in 1985.

== Selected filmography ==
- The Human Tornado (1925)
- Sitting Pretty (1933)
- Punch Drunks (1934 - directed)
- Gift of Gab (1934)
- Music Is Magic (1935)
- The Man Who Wouldn't Talk (1940)
- Great Guns (1941)
- Blondie Goes to College (1942)
- A-Haunting We Will Go (1942)
- Follow the Boys (1944)
- Abbott and Costello in Hollywood (1945)
- You Never Can Tell (1951 - directed)
- Bedtime for Bonzo (1951)
