= Bright Victory =

1951 film by Mark Robson

- Theatrical poster
- Directed by: Mark Robson
- Screenplay by: Robert Buckner
- Based on: Lights Out; 1945 novel by Baynard Kendrick
- Produced by: Robert Buckner
- Starring: Arthur Kennedy; Peggy Dow
- Cinematography: William H. Daniels
- Edited by: Russell F. Schoengarth
- Music by: Frank Skinner
- Color process: Black and white
- Production company: Universal International Pictures
- Distributed by: Universal Pictures
- Release dates: July 31, 1950 (New York); November 30, 1950 (Los Angeles)
- Running time: 97 minutes
- Country: United States
- Language: English

Bright Victory is a 1951 American romance film about an American soldier who had been blinded in the Second World War, directed by Mark Robson and starring Arthur Kennedy and Peggy Dow, based on the novel Lights Out by Baynard Kendrick.

== Plot ==
During World War II, American sergeant Larry Nevins is blinded by a German sniper while fighting in North Africa. He is taken to a Pennsylvania hospital for other blinded soldiers, where he struggles to accept his disability.

Though initially despondent, Larry is taught to orient himself and walk the grounds and in town by memorization and with use of a cane. He befriends Joe Morgan, another blinded veteran, and Judy, a local bank teller who volunteers by socializing with disabled soldiers.

One day, Larry, unaware that Joe is black, utters a racial slur, causing a rift between Larry and the others. Meanwhile, he progresses well in his recovery, passing a crucial test to see how well he can handle himself on the street. He is cleared for furlough, so Judy takes him to spend a weekend at her sister's nearby cabin, where he fishes and is entertained by her family.

From Judy's brother-in-law, Larry learns of a very successful blind lawyer, giving him hope for the future. After dinner, Judy reveals her love for him. Larry tells her that he needs more security and family support and already has a fiancée in his Florida hometown. Somewhat dispirited, he returns home and faces difficulty dealing with the racial attitudes of his Southern parents and friends. His fiancée's family harbors doubts about his fitness as a son-in-law, and his parents are downcast because of his disability.

Larry is happy to see his fiancée Chris, although he still thinks of Judy. After a bad experience at his homecoming party, he tells Chris of the difficulties that they can expect with his disability and that he wants to relocate rather than be patronized with the menial local job that her successful father has offered him. After some thought, Chris tells Larry that she does not feel strong enough to marry and move far away with him while he struggles to make a new life for both of them.

Returning to the hospital, Larry takes a side trip to Philadelphia and meets the successful blind lawyer, who tells him that life is difficult but worth the struggle and that his wife was an invaluable helper to him in his career.

At the train station en route to begin a more advanced rehabilitation course, Larry is unexpectedly reunited with Judy, and they joyfully declare their love. Boarding the train, he hears Joe Morgan's name called. He catches Joe's arm, apologizes for all of the hurt he has caused and asks that they remain friends, and Joe accepts the apology. They board and sit together as the train leaves the station.

== Cast ==
- Arthur Kennedy as Larry Nevins
- Peggy Dow as Judy Greene
- Julia Adams as Chris Paterson
- James Edwards as Joe Morgan
- Will Geer as Mr. Lawrence Nevins
- Nana Bryant as Mrs. Claire Nevins
- Jim Backus as Bill Grayson
- Minor Watson as Mr. Edward Paterson
- Joan Banks as Janet Grayson
- Richard Egan as Sgt. John Masterson
- John Hudson as Cpl. John Flagg
- Marjorie Crossland as Mrs. Paterson
- Donald Miele as 'Moose' Garvey
- Murray Hamilton as Pete Hamiton
- Larry Keating as Jess Coe
- Hugh Reilly as Capt. Phelan
- Mary Cooper as Nurse Bailey
- Rock Hudson as Dudek
- Ken Harvey as Joe Scanlon
- Russell Dennis as Pvt. Fred Tyler
- Philip Faversham as Lt. Atkins (as Phil Faversham)
- Robert F. Simon as Psychiatrist
- Virginia Mullen as Mrs. Coe
- Ruth Esherick as Nurse

== Production ==
Part of the film was shot at Valley Forge General Army Hospital in Phoenixville, Pennsylvania, and the town's name is mentioned in the film. Scenes were also shot in downtown Phoenixville, Kimberton and at Broad Street Station in Philadelphia.

Robson called Bright Victory "a very good film" although he admitted that "it was a disaster financially".

== Reception ==
In a contemporary review for The New York Times, critic Bosley Crowther wrote:

Mr. Buckner and Mr. Robson have done a superior job of showing a most real and human picture of the ordeals and compensations which blindness brings. They have filmed, with their hero in focus, a fine documentation of the techniques by which blinded veterans are treated and trained ... They have captured with real and piercing poignance those experiences of greatest emotional trial, such as telling a mother of one's blindness or accepting the reality oneself. And they have even got into their drama a bit of social philosophy by having their blind hero discover the inconsequence of the color of a true friend. ... Of course, in the last analysis, "Bright Victory'' does not achieve a truly subjective understanding of the experiences of the blind. To do so, it would be essential to have the audience sense the lack of sight, too, and that would mean eliminating the realistic image from the screen. But within the understood area of emotion in which "Bright Victory" revolves, it does a fine job of conveying sense and sensibility.

Edwin Schallert of the Los Angeles Times wrote: "This, indeed, is a film to bid for Academy laurels by virtue of its performances, notably at least, the one given by Kennedy, playing a blinded veteran who fights a soul-searching psychological battle for rehabilitation. ... Above all else, this picture has taste, gentility and great humanity. It should actually have some sort of special award because it represents such fine ideals and expresses them with so much moving interest."

Jane Corby of the Brooklyn Eagle called the film "one of the year's most important pictures, from several angles" and wrote: "It is important first because it is a finely made, absorbing film, and second because it deals with a current problem that is everybody's concern—the blinded war veteran. But it is also terrifically important because Arthur Kennedy, the star, gives a performance in this Universal-International picture that would be outstanding in any year, and will probably hold its place among all competitors for many years to come."

== Awards ==
Bright Victory was nominated for Academy Awards for Best Actor in a Leading Role (Arthur Kennedy) and Best Sound Recording (Leslie I. Carey). The film was also entered into the 1951 Cannes Film Festival.
