= All at Sea =

All at Sea may refer to:

== Film ==
- All at Sea (1929 film), an American film starring Karl Dane
- All at Sea (1933 film), an American short film starring Ethel Barrymore
- All at Sea, a 1933 short film with Charlie Chaplin
- All at Sea (1935 film), a British film starring Googie Withers
- All at Sea (1940 film), a British film starring Sandy Powell
- All at Sea (1977 film), an Australian TV movie
- All at Sea (2011 film), an Italian film starring Gigi Proietti
- An alternative name for the 1957 British film Barnacle Bill, starring Alec Guinness
- An alternative name for the 2010 Norwegian film Wide Blue Yonder, starring Brian Cox

== Television ==
- All at Sea (TV series), a British television series set in a B&B
- Timothy Spall: All at Sea, a British TV series following his journey "round the British Isles" in a barge
- "All at Sea", a Thomas and Friends season 3 episode

== Other uses ==
- All at Sea (ruleset), a naval ruleset for the Games Workshop
- "All at Sea", a song from the album Twentysomething by Jamie Cullum
- All At Sea (horse) (1989–2007)
