= Almira Sessions =

American actress (1888–1974)

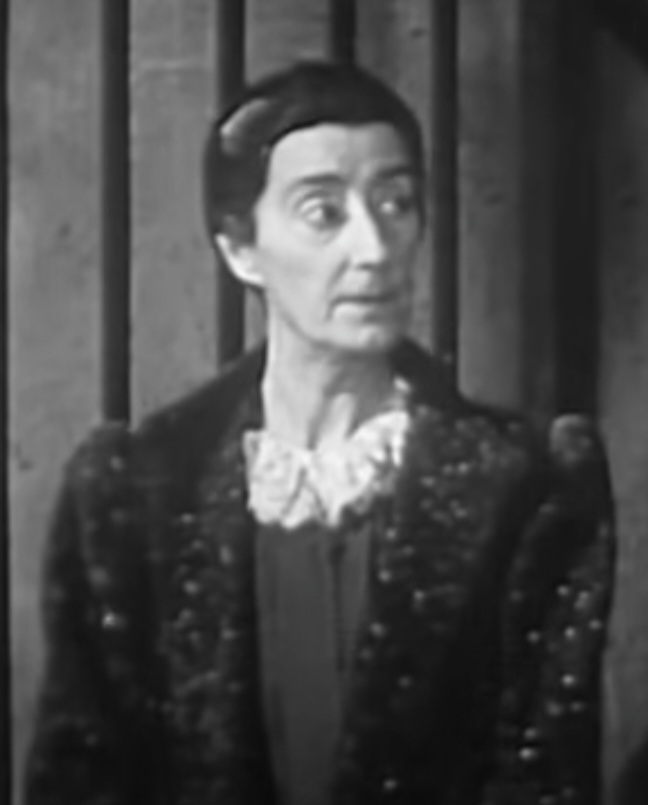
- Sessions in Dixie Jamboree (1944)
- Born: September 16, 1888; Washington, D.C., U.S.
- Died: August 3, 1974 (aged 85); Los Angeles, California, U.S.
- Occupation: Actress
- Years active: 1909–1972
- Relatives: Winfield Scott Hancock, great-grandfather

Almira Sessions (September 16, 1888 – August 3, 1974) was an American character actress of stage, screen and television. Born in Washington, D.C., her career took her through all the acting mediums of the 20th century. She appeared in more than 500 films and television shows. She worked into her 80s, finally retiring shortly before her death in 1974 in Los Angeles.

== Early life and career ==
Sessions was born into a very well-known family in Washington D.C., on September 16, 1888. Her great-grandfather was General Winfield Scott Hancock. A debutante, she followed her coming out party with her introduction into the acting profession, appearing in a 1909 performance of the comic operetta The Sultan of Sulu by George Ade and Nathaniel D. Mann with the Aborn Opera Company at the National Theatre in Washington, D. C. Her tenure with Aborn ended when she refused to wear tights as a member of the chorus in It Happened in Nordland. A wire-service story said, "Miss Sessions refused point blank to don fleshings, and when urged to do so by the stage manager, stalked from the theater." The story of her rebellion was printed in newspapers across the United States. Following that refusal she returned to private life. Her early career was spent performing in cabarets before she moved to New York City, where she began performing on the stage and on Bob Hope's radio show.

When Sessions's contract with Aborn ended, she began performing in vaudeville. She sang in clubs and small cabarets, and "one day I discovered I was funny. And that I could make more money singing off key than on." She left entertainment when World War I began, going to Washington, D. C. to be a typist for the War Risk Bureau. She transferred from that office to the French Commission, working as an interpreter until the war ended.

During the 1930s she appeared in many stage productions, including several Broadway productions.

== Film and television ==
While appearing on the stage in New York during the 1930s, Sessions made her film debut in Edward Sloman's 1932 film Wayward. While this marked her debut in films, it was not the true beginning to her career in film. Wayward was filmed in New York at the Paramount Publix studios. Sessions did not begin to appear regularly in feature films until eight years later, in 1940, with her appearance in Norman Taurog's Little Nellie Kelly, starring Judy Garland. During the 1930s she would occasionally appear in film shorts, such as 1935's Two Boobs in a Balloon, starring Edgar Bergen.

During her film career, which spanned four decades from the 1940s to the 1970s, she appeared in numerous notable films, including: Preston Sturges's Sullivan's Travels (1942), starring Joel McCrea and Veronica Lake; the William Wellman drama, The Ox-Bow Incident, starring Henry Fonda, Dana Andrews, and Anthony Quinn; her performance as Hattie the cook in the 1943 comedy, My Kingdom for a Cook, starring Charles Coburn, garnered her notice for her comedic talent; another Preston Sturges film, the 1944 comedy The Miracle of Morgan's Creek, with Eddie Bracken and Betty Hutton; the Rodgers and Hammerstein musical State Fair (1945); the Cole Porter biopic, Night and Day (1946), starring Cary Grant and Alexis Smith; Monsieur Verdoux, Charlie Chaplin's 1947 comedy-drama in which she had one of her infrequent featured roles; 1946 saw her dramatic performance in the film noir Fear highlighted in reviews; the iconic It's a Wonderful Life (1947), directed by Frank Capra and starring James Stewart; the Christmas classic The Bishop's Wife (1948), which stars Cary Grant, Loretta Young, and David Niven and was directed by Henry Koster; the period comedy Take Me Out to the Ball Game, starring Frank Sinatra, Gene Kelly and Esther Williams; and King Vidor's 1949 production of Ayn Rand's The Fountainhead, starring Gary Cooper and Patricia Neal.

The 1950s would see her continue appearing in numerous films, including such notable pictures as the Henry Koster classic comedy Harvey (1950), starring James Stewart; the film version of Damon Runyon's short story The Lemon Drop Kid, starring Bob Hope; 1955's Rebel Without a Cause (1955), starring James Dean and Natalie Wood; Michael Curtiz's 1956 crime drama The Scarlet Hour; and Elvis Presley's third film, Loving You (1957). The 1950s would see Sessions enter the new medium of television. Beginning with The Adventures of Kit Carson, she had guest appearances in dozens of television shows during the decade. Some of the shows she appeared in were: Adventures of Superman, The Adventures of Ozzie & Harriet, Hopalong Cassidy, Lassie, The Adventures of Rin Tin Tin, and Walt Disney's Wonderful World of Color. In 1957 Sessions appeared as Mrs. Thatcher in the TV western Cheyenne in the episode titled "The Iron Trail."

Sessions's career slowed down in the 1960s, but she continued to appear both in films and on television. Her film credits during this decade included the film adaptation of the Tennessee Williams play Summer and Smoke (1961), starring Laurence Harvey, Geraldine Page, and Rita Moreno; the 1963 comedy Under the Yum Yum Tree, with Jack Lemmon, Carol Lynley, Dean Jones, and Edie Adams; the 1968 thriller, The Boston Strangler, starring Tony Curtis and Henry Fonda; and Roman Polanski's horror classic, Rosemary's Baby, starring Mia Farrow, John Cassavetes, and Ruth Gordon. Her television credits during the 1960s included: The Donna Reed Show, The Munsters, F Troop, The Andy Griffith Show - in the very last episode (Mayberry R.F.D.) as Mrs. Fletcher, and The Carol Burnett Show. While her credits in the 1970s were limited as her career wound down, the films and television shows in which she appeared well known. Her lone film credit was in the classic horror film Willard (1971), and her television credits included guest appearances on Marcus Welby, M.D., Night Gallery, and Love, American Style.

== Personal life and death ==
A fall in 1973 made Sessions a semi-invalid and ended her career. She died in a convalescent home in Los Angeles on August 3, 1974, aged 85.

== Filmography ==
(Per AFI database)

- Wayward (1932) as Aunt Mary Lou Reed (uncredited)
- Little Nellie Kelly (1940) as Miss Corrigan, Nellie's Nurse
- Jennie (1940) as Mrs. Willoughby
- Chad Hanna (1940) as Mrs. Mott (scenes deleted)
- Blondie in Society (1941) as Furious Woman with Broom (uncredited)
- Blossoms in the Dust (1941) as Mrs. Brown (uncredited)
- Ringside Maisie (1941) as Mrs. Muldowny (uncredited)
- She Knew All the Answers (1941) as Elaine Wingate
- Three Girls About Town (1941) as Tessie Conarchy
- Sun Valley Serenade (1941) as Nurse
- Sullivan's Travels (1941) as Ursula
- Blondie for Victory (1942) as Mrs. Larkin
- I Married an Angel (1942) as Mrs. Scallion (uncredited)
- The Lone Star Ranger (1942) as Mrs. Strong
- My Sister Eileen (1942) as Prospective Tenant (uncredited)
- Obliging Young Lady (1942) as Maid
- Happy Go Lucky (1943) as Spinster (uncredited)
- The Heat's On (1943) as Hannah Bainbridge
- My Kingdom for a Cook (1943) as Hattie
- The Ox-Bow Incident (1943) as Miss Swanson (uncredited)
- Presenting Lily Mars (1943) as Boardinghouse Manager (uncredited)
- Slightly Dangerous (1943) as Peggy's Landlady (uncredited)
- Young Ideas (1943) as Club Woman (uncredited)
- Assignment in Brittany (1943) as Madame Perro (uncredited)
- Madame Curie (1944) as Madame Michaud (uncredited)
- I Love a Soldier (1944) as Mrs. Munn (uncredited)
- Henry Aldrich's Little Secret (1944) as Aunt Maude
- The Doughgirls (1944) as Hatchet-Faced Woman (uncredited)
- Dixie Jamboree (1944) as Ellabella Jackson
- Can't Help Singing (1944) as Lemuel's Wife (uncredited)
- Maisie Goes to Reno (1944) as Lady with Reno Bus Ticket (uncredited)
- The Miracle of Morgan's Creek (1944) as Justice's Wife (uncredited)
- San Diego, I Love You (1944) as Mrs. Mainwaring (uncredited)
- Bathing Beauty (1944) as Ms. Phillips (uncredited)
- Nob Hill (1945)
- She Wouldn't Say Yes (1945) as Miss Downer (uncredited)
- The Southerner (1945) as Store Customer (uncredited)
- State Fair (1945) as Farmer's Wife (uncredited)
- Two O'Clock Courage (1945) as Mrs. Daniels (uncredited)
- The Woman Who Came Back (1945) as Bessie
- The Diary of a Chambermaid (1946) as Marianne
- Do You Love Me (1946) as Miss Wayburn (uncredited)
- Fear (1946) as Mrs. Williams
- The Missing Lady (1946) as Miss Effie
- Night and Day (1946) as Woman in Hospital Hall (uncredited)
- It's a Wonderful Life (1946) as Potter's Secretary (uncredited)
- Cross My Heart (1947) as Old Hag (uncredited)
- For the Love of Rusty (1947) as Sarah Johnson (uncredited)
- I Wonder Who's Kissing Her Now? (1947) as Miss Claybourne (uncredited)
- Love and Learn (1947) as The Bride (uncredited)
- Merton of the Movies (1947) as Mammoth Studio's Nurse (uncredited)
- Monsieur Verdoux (1947) as Lena Couvais
- Apartment for Peggy (1948) as Mrs. Landon (uncredited)
- Arthur Takes Over (1948) as Mrs. Barnafogle
- The Bishop's Wife (1948) as First Lady in Merchel's
- The Bride Goes Wild (1948) as Miss Williams (uncredited)
- Cass Timberlane (1948) as Tilda Hatter (uncredited)
- Good Sam (1948) as Landlady (uncredited)
- Julia Misbehaves (1948) as Woman in street (uncredited)
- Family Honeymoon (1949) as Maid (uncredited)
- The Fountainhead (1949) as Dominique's Housekeeper at Quarry (uncredited)
- Ladies of the Chorus (1949) as Old Lady at Engagement Party (uncredited)
- Night Unto Night (1949) as Hotel Maid
- Roseanna McCoy (1949) as Cousin Zinny
- Take Me Out to the Ball Game (1949) as Baseball Fan (uncredited)
- Black Hand (1950) as Tourist (uncredited)
- The Blazing Sun (1950) as Mrs. Purty (uncredited)
- Fancy Pants (1950) as Belle (uncredited)
- Joe Palooka in Humphrey Takes a Chance (1950) as Mrs. Hardwig
- Kill the Umpire (1950) as Wife of Man on Telephone / Baseball Fan in Stands (uncredited)
- Montana (1950) as Widowed Townswoman (uncredited)
- The Old Frontier (1950) as Mrs. Smedley
- Please Believe Me (1950) as Receptionist (uncredited)
- Summer Stock (1950) as Constance Fliggerton (uncredited)
- Tarnished (1950) as Mrs. Fennelly (uncredited)
- Harvey (1950) as Mrs. Halsey (uncredited)
- Here Comes the Groom (1951) as Wife on Airplane (uncredited)
- The Lemon Drop Kid (1951) as Mrs. Santoro (uncredited)
- Oh! Susanna (1951) as Officer's Wife at Dance (uncredited)
- Oklahoma Annie (1952) as Mrs. Fudge
- Wagons West (1952) as Ada, Old Maid
- The Affairs of Dobie Gillis (1953) as Aunt Naomi
- Code Two (1953) as Nurse (uncredited)
- Paris Model (1953) as Mrs. Boggs
- Sweethearts on Parade (1953) as Townswoman (uncredited)
- Ride, Vaquero! (1953) as Woman in Bank (uncredited)
- The Sun Shines Bright (1953) as Society Matron at Ball (uncredited)
- Forever Female (1954) as Tommy's Mother (uncredited)
- Hell's Outpost (1954) as Mrs. O'Sullivan's Companion (uncredited)
- It's Always Fair Weather (1955) as Longwood House Manager (uncredited)
- The Prodigal (1955) as Woman Buying Grain (uncredited)
- Rebel Without a Cause (1955) as Old Lady Teacher (uncredited)
- Calling Homicide (1956) as Mrs. Ida Dunsetter
- The Scarlet Hour (1956) as Landlady (uncredited)
- Loving You (1957) (uncredited)
- Andy Hardy Comes Home (1958) as Carvel Citizen at Meeting (uncredited)
- The Badlanders (1958) as Old Woman Stagecoach Passenger (uncredited)
- Summer and Smoke (1961) as Committee Woman (uncredited)
- Paradise Alley (1962) as Mrs. Walker
- Under the Yum Yum Tree (1963) as Woman (uncredited)
- The Boston Strangler (1968) as Emma Hodak
- Rosemary's Baby (1968) as Mrs. Sabatini (uncredited)
- Willard (1971) as Carrie Smith

== Selected Television Appearances ==
- Alfred Hitchcock Presents (1959) (Season 4 Episode 33: "The Dusty Drawer") as Mrs. Merrell
- Alfred Hitchcock Presents (1959) (Season 5 Episode 23: "Craig's Will") as Martha Henderson, Housekeeper
