= Milton Schwarzwald =

American film director

Milton Edward Schwarzwald (16 September 1891, Detroit – 2 March 1950, Hollywood) was a film director and musical theater composer and producer. In the 1930s, he directed numerous Mentone Productions comedy musical variety films before departing to produce musical theater in 1939.

Leo Feist published sheet music for his operetta Flora Bella in 1916. He and Arthur Francis (early pen name of Ira Gershwin) collaborated on a song for the 1922 musical Molly Darling.

Playbill and IBDB list him as the musical director of four theatrical productions in the 1920s and as a musical contributor to a couple more.

BFI credits him with the music for five films in 1949 and 1950.

His son Arnold Schwarzwald was a composer and soundman.

== Filmography ==
- Revue à la Carte (1935)
- Gus Van's Music Shoppe (1935), director
- Gus Van's Garden Party (1936), director
- Musical Airwaves (1936), director of the 10-minute short for Universal Pictures
- Carnival Time (1936), two-reel film with singing, music, dance, and acrobatics
- Maids and Music (1938), producer
- Rumba Rhythms (1942), musical director
- Top Man (film) (1943), producer
- Girl on the Spot (1945), executive producer
- Johnny Stool Pigeon (1949), composer
- Illegal Entry (1949), music
- The Pecos Pistol (1949), composer
- The Story of Molly X (1949), composer
- Ma and Pa Kettle Go to Town (1950), composer
- The Kid from Texas (1950), musical director
- I Was a Shoplifter (1950), music director
- Outside the Wall (1950), music director
- Woman in Hiding (1950), music director

== Discography ==
- Baby Vampire, sheet music, composer
