= Phil Regan =

Phil Regan may refer to:

- Phil Regan (actor) (1906–1996), American actor and singer
- Phil Regan (baseball) (1937–2026), American baseball player
