= Undertow (1949 film) =

1949 thriller film directed by William Castle

- Theatrical release poster
- Directed by: William Castle
- Screenplay by: Arthur T. Horman; Lee Loeb
- Story by: Arthur T. Horman
- Produced by: Ralph Dietrich
- Starring: Scott Brady; John Russell; Dorothy Hart; Peggy Dow; Bruce Bennett
- Cinematography: Irving Glassberg
- Edited by: Ralph Dawson
- Music by: Milton Schwarzwald (musical direction)
- Color process: Black and white
- Production company: Universal International
- Distributed by: Universal – International
- Release date: December 3, 1949
- Running time: 71 minutes
- Country: United States
- Language: English

Undertow is a 1949 American film noir crime film directed by William Castle and starring Scott Brady, John Russell, Dorothy Hart and Peggy Dow. A young Rock Hudson has a supporting role, his second film appearance and the first in which he is named in the credits. Brady plays a former Chicago mobster who is accused of murdering his old boss.

== Plot ==
"Reno" Tony Reagan (Scott Brady) was a low-level member of the Chicago syndicate; he was run out of town back then for being involved with the kingpin Big Jim's niece. Seven years later, Reagan has been vacationing in Reno, at a lodge in which he intends to invest with the father of an old army buddy. He bumps into an old friend/former colleague from Chicago named Danny Morgan (John Russell). It turns out they are both hoping to soon be married.

On his way home to Chicago to propose to his girl, Reagan shares the flight with a schoolteacher, Ann McKnight (Peggy Dow), someone he met at a Reno casino and helped win at the gambling table. At the airport, he is met by the police; it seems they have been tipped off that Reagan is looking to stir trouble with Big Jim.

The police put a tail on him, whom he shakes on a Chicago elevated train. Reagan meets up with his bride-to-be, Sally Lee (Dorothy Hart). He tells her he will go to Big Jim to make peace. But when the uncle is murdered, Reagan is framed for it.

On the run from both the police and the unknown murderers, Reagan enlists the help of McKnight and an old buddy, Charles Reckling (Bruce Bennett), a detective. They discover the truth: Morgan is also engaged to Sally Lee, and together they are responsible for murdering her uncle and framing Reagan.

Reagan manages to clear himself, however, after which he and McKnight end up in each other's arms, bound for that lodge in Reno.

== Cast ==
- Scott Brady as Tony Reagan
- John Russell as Danny Morgan
- Dorothy Hart as Sally Lee
- Peggy Dow as Ann McKnight
- Bruce Bennett as Reckling
- Gregg Martell as Frost
- Robert Anderson as Stoner
- Daniel Ferniel as Gene
- Rock Hudson (spelled “Roc”) as Detective
- Charles Sherlock as Cooper
- Ann Pearce as Clerk
- Robert Easton as Fisher
