= Dorothy Hart =

American actress (1922–2004)

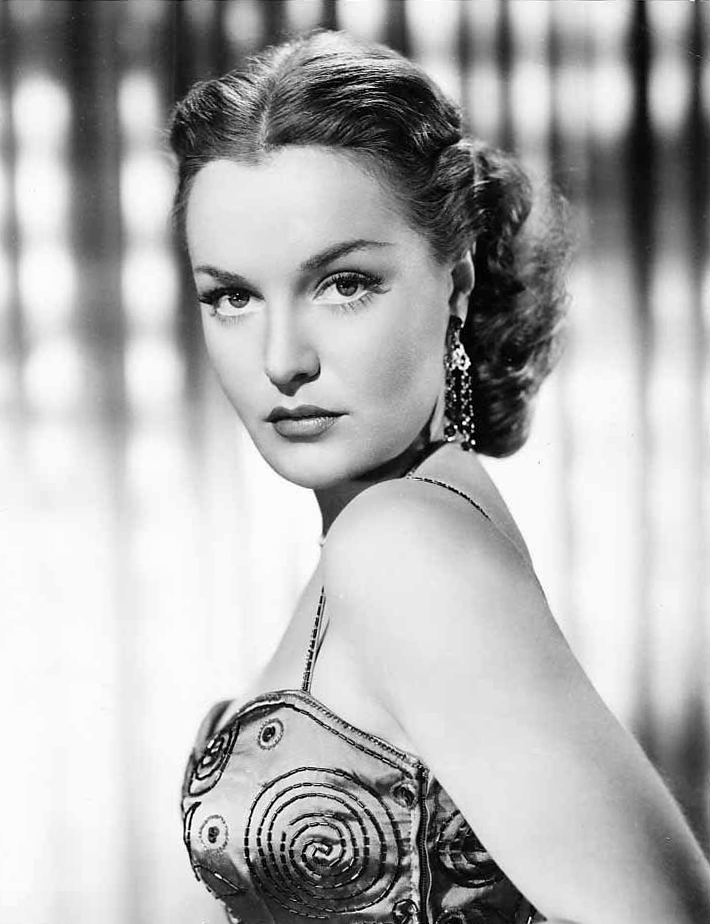
- Dorothy Hart in 1951
- Born: April 4, 1922; Cleveland, Ohio, U.S.
- Died: July 11, 2004 (aged 82); Asheville, North Carolina, U.S.
- Education: Case Western Reserve University
- Occupation: Actress
- Years active: 1947–1952
- Spouse: Frederick Pittera (m. 1954; div. 1965)
- Children: 1

Dorothy Hart (April 4, 1922 – July 11, 2004) was an American actress, mostly in supporting roles. She portrayed Howard Duff's fiancée in the film The Naked City (1948).

== Early life ==
Born in Cleveland, Ohio, Hart was the daughter of insurance executive Walter Hart and Mary Hart.

Hart attended Denison University for one year before graduating from Case Western Reserve University with a B.A. degree. She was also a member of Kappa Alpha Theta. After gaining some experience at the Cleveland Play House, she decided on a singing career.

In 1944, a newspaper friend submitted her photo (Note: The caption for a photograph of Hart that was distributed by the Newspaper Enterprise Association in July 1944 says, "Wounded war veterans at Crile General hospital in Parma, O." selected Hart "as Greater Cleveland's entrant in the National Cinderella Cover Girl Contest".) in the Columbia Pictures "National Cinderella Cover Girl Contest of 1944." Hart had saved enough money to go to New York when she learned that she was high on the list of Cover Girl finalists. After winning the contest, the studio paid for her trip in August 1944, and she was given a screen test for the Rita Hayworth film Tonight and Every Night, as her contest award.

Winning the "National Cinderella Cover Girl Contest" brought with it a contract for Hart to be a model with the Conover Modeling Agency, which in turn led to pictures of her "appearing in fashionable magazines all over the world."

She should not be confused with Dorothy Hart from the children's soap opera “The Sunbrite Junior Nurse Corps." Although that Dorothy Hart was presented in Sunbrite's advertising as a real person, she was played by Lucy Gilman Scott.

== Film career ==
On August 25, 1946, Hart signed a contract with Columbia Pictures. Her first big movie break came starring alongside Randolph Scott and Barbara Britton in the Western Gunfighters (1947), a Cinecolor film for Columbia.

While filming in October, 1946 Hart was sent home from location with an illness which was diagnosed as influenza. In February, 1947 she was injured during horseback sequences in Arizona. Minor corrective surgery was performed at Cedars of Lebanon Hospital in Los Angeles, California. The Painted Desert was one of the main sites utilized for this movie. Barbara Britton played the female lead in the adventure drama with Hart heading up the supporting cast.

Columnist Hedda Hopper reported in a June 1947 column that Mary Pickford was suing Dorothy Hart for a sum of $79,000 because the young actress refused to accept a role in the film There Goes Lona Henry. Pickford stated in an interview that she hoped to take an unknown girl and make her into a great star. Hart refused the role because she did not want to sign away seven years of her career for a single movie opportunity.

Hart made Larceny (1948) with Shelley Winters, and The Countess of Monte Cristo (also 1948) with Sonja Henie, both for Universal Pictures. She co-starred in The Naked City, starring Barry Fitzgerald, which premiered on March 10, 1948. She played the bad girl who double-crosses her fiancé in William Castle's Undertow (1949).

Hart became the tenth actress to portray Jane when she appeared opposite Lex Barker as Tarzan in Tarzan's Savage Fury (1952). She also co-starred in Outside the Wall (1950) and I Was a Communist for the FBI (1951), playing a Communist schoolteacher who eventually repudiates the party.

== United Nations ==
In 1952, Hart left acting to work with the American Association for the United Nations in New York. The organization's first female entertainer, she spoke at the United Nations and was an observer at the 1957-1958 meeting of the World Federation of United Nations in Geneva.

== Personal life ==
Hart was twice married and divorced. With Frederick Pittera, she had a son, Douglas (born 1961).

Dorothy Hart died of Alzheimer's disease on July 11, 2004, in Asheville, North Carolina, at age 82. She was survived by her son, a sister, and three grandchildren.

== Filmography ==
Year	Title	Role	Notes
1947	Gunfighters	Jane Banner	
1947	Down to Earth	The New Terpsichore	
1947	The Exile	Lady in Waiting	Uncredited
1948	The Naked City	Ruth Morrison	
1948	Larceny	Madeline	
1948	The Countess of Monte Cristo	Peg Manning	
1949	Take One False Step	Helen Gentling	
1949	Calamity Jane and Sam Bass	Katherine 'Kathy' Egan	
1949	The Story of Molly X	Anne	
1949	Undertow	Sally Lee	
1950	Outside the Wall	Ann Taylor	
1951	Raton Pass	Lena Casamajor	
1951	I Was a Communist for the FBI	Eve Merrick	
1951	Inside the Walls of Folsom Prison	Jane Pardue	Uncredited
1952	Tarzan's Savage Fury	Jane	
1952	Loan Shark	Ann Nelson	
