= John Rodney =

American actor

- John Rodney in Key Largo (1948)
- Born: Raymond John Flynn; March 7, 1914; Brooklyn, New York, U.S.
- Died: January 1, 1996 (aged 81); Frederick, Maryland, U.S.
- Occupation: Actor
- Years active: 1947–1964

Raymond John Flynn (March 7, 1914 – January 1, 1996), known professionally as John Rodney, was an American actor, who worked in film and television. He also used the name John Flynn.

== Career ==
=== Theatrical films ===
Rodney was born in Brooklyn, New York in March 1914 and his career spanned from the late 1940s until the early 1960s, with significant movie roles and numerous television appearances. He is probably best known to audiences as Deputy Sheriff Sawyer in John Huston's crime film Key Largo (1948) starring Humphrey Bogart, Edward G. Robinson and Lauren Bacall. Rodney also appeared in the films Pursued (1947), starring Teresa Wright and Robert Mitchum, Fighter Squadron, (1948) starring Edmond O'Brien and Robert Stack, and Calamity Jane and Sam Bass (1949), starring Yvonne De Carlo and Howard Duff.

=== Television ===
Rodney appeared on many television programs in the late 1940s, '50s and '60s, including a Westinghouse Studio One episode titled The Storm, Bonanza as the actor Edwin Booth, Sea Hunt (1961) starring Lloyd Bridges, season 4's episodes 29 & 37 of Wagon Train, The Fugitive, starring David Janssen, and Gunsmoke. He guest starred on an episode of McHale's Navy, starring Ernest Borgnine. Rodney last appeared in The Tycoon, starring Walter Brennan, in 1964.

== Filmography ==
Year	Title	Role	Notes
1947	Pursued	Adam Callum	
1948	Key Largo	Deputy Clyde Sawyer	
1948	Fighter Squadron	Col. William 'Bill' Brickley	
1949	Calamity Jane and Sam Bass	Morgan	
