= Calamity Jane and Sam Bass =

1949 film by George Sherman

- Film poster
- Directed by: George Sherman
- Screenplay by: Maurice Geraghty; Melvin Levy
- Story by: George Sherman
- Produced by: Leonard Goldstein
- Starring: Yvonne De Carlo; Howard Duff; Dorothy Hart; Willard Parker; Lloyd Bridges
- Cinematography: Irving Glassberg
- Edited by: Edward Curtiss
- Color process: Technicolor
- Production company: Universal International Pictures
- Distributed by: Universal Pictures
- Release date: June 8, 1949 (Dallas)
- Running time: 86 minutes
- Country: United States
- Language: English

Calamity Jane and Sam Bass is a 1949 American Western film directed by George Sherman and starring Yvonne De Carlo, Howard Duff and Dorothy Hart.

== Plot ==
Sheriff Will Egan doesn't want any gamblers in Denton, Texas and is suspicious when stranger Sam Bass arrives in town. The sheriff's sister Kathy likes the newcomer, though, while Calamity Jane is impressed with Sam's way with horses, even more so when Sam spots a poorly shod favorite in a horse race and bets against him, winning a tidy sum.

Sam buys the losing horse with his wager winnings and intends to race him. But when a hired guy poisons the horse, Sam shoots him. Sam tries to turn himself in, but feels he can't get a fair trial and busts out.

Sam becomes an outlaw, robbing banks. He believes Kathy has tricked him and turns to Jane.

He ends up shot, dying in Jane's arms, yet seemingly in love with Kathy.

== Cast ==
- Yvonne De Carlo as Calamity Jane
- Howard Duff as Sam Bass
- Dorothy Hart as Kathy Egan
- Willard Parker as Will Egan
- Norman Lloyd as Jim Murphy
- Lloyd Bridges as Joel Collins
- Marc Lawrence as Harry Dean
- Houseley Stevenson as Dakota
- Milburn Stone as Abe Jones
- Clifton Young as Link
- John Rodney as Morgan
- Roy Roberts as Marshal Peak
- Ann Doran as Mrs. Lucy Egan
- Charles Cane as J. Wells
- Walter Baldwin as Doc Purdy

== Production ==
In March 1948 Universal announced they would make The Story of Sam Bass from a story by director George Sherman. It would be an expensive production in Technicolor shot on location in Kanab, Utah. Jimmy Stewart was sought to play the title role. The role eventually went to Howard Duff who had just come to notice in Brute Force (1947).

Universal decided to cast Yvonne De Carlo as the female lead. De Carlo was under contract to Universal at the time, and had just been entertaining US troops in Europe. She was reluctant to make the film as it was a Western, but did not want to go on suspension. (She had been briefly engaged to her co-star Howard Duff in April 1947.) Dorothy Hart and Willard Parker signed to play support roles.

Filming started 7 October 1948 in Kanab, Utah. Johnson Canyon, Vermillion Cliffs, and the Gap were additional filming locations.

It was the second film about Calamity Jane made that year, the other being The Paleface.

== Release ==
Universal adopted a regional opening strategy for the film, a strategy that they had tried earlier in the year with The Life of Riley. The film had its world premiere on June 8, 1949, in Dallas, Texas and then opened in 600 theaters in Oklahoma and Texas over a seven-week period. The approach was a success with grosses double that compared to normal release patterns. In July, it had a further saturation release in 200 theaters in Salt Lake City, Denver, Omaha and Des Moines.

== See also ==
- List of American films of 1949
