= Hey Boy! Hey Girl! =

- Directed by: David Lowell Rich
- Written by: Raphael Hayes; James West
- Produced by: Harry A. Romm
- Starring: Louis Prima; Keely Smith; James Gregory
- Cinematography: Ray Cory
- Edited by: Al Clark
- Music by: Van Cleave
- Distributed by: Columbia Pictures
- Release date: August 5, 1959
- Running time: 83 minutes
- Country: United States
- Language: English

Hey Boy! Hey Girl! is a 1959 American musical film directed by David Lowell Rich. It stars Louis Prima and Keely Smith.

== Cast ==
- Louis Prima as Himself
- Keely Smith as Dorothy Spencer
- James Gregory as Father Burton
- Henry Slate as Marty Moran
