= Laughing Irish Eyes =

1936 film by Joseph Santley

- Directed by: Joseph Santley
- Screenplay by: Olive Cooper; Ben Ryan; Stanley Rauh
- Story by: Sidney Sutherland; Wallace Sullivan
- Produced by: Nat Levine
- Starring: Phil Regan; Walter C. Kelly; Evalyn Knapp; Ray Walker; Mary Gordon; Warren Hymer
- Cinematography: Milton Krasner; Reggie Lanning
- Edited by: Joseph H. Lewis
- Production company: Republic Pictures
- Distributed by: Republic Pictures
- Release date: March 4, 1936
- Running time: 70 minutes
- Country: United States
- Language: English

Laughing Irish Eyes is a 1936 American comedy film directed by Joseph Santley and written by Olive Cooper, Ben Ryan and Stanley Rauh. The film stars Phil Regan, Walter C. Kelly, Evalyn Knapp, Ray Walker, Mary Gordon and Warren Hymer. The film was released on March 4, 1936, by Republic Pictures.

== Cast ==
- Phil Regan as Danny O'Keefe
- Walter C. Kelly as Pat Kelly
- Evalyn Knapp as Peggy Kelly
- Ray Walker as Eddie Bell
- Mary Gordon as Mrs. O'Keefe
- Warren Hymer as Tiger O'Keefe
- Betty Compson as Molly
- J. M. Kerrigan as Tim
- Herman Bing as Weisbecher
- Raymond Hatton as Gallagher
- Clarence Muse as Deacon
- Russell Hicks as Silk Taylor
- Maurice Black as Tony Martin
- John Sheehan as Joe Cronin
- Robert Homans as Announcer
- John Indrisano as Fight Trainer
- Ritchie McCarron as Dynamite O'Reilly
- Jimmy O'Gatty as Killer O'Kearny
- Don La Rue as Kid Campo
- Charles Randolph as Referee
- Raymond Brown as Editor

== Critical reception ==
Lionel Collier, writing for the British magazine Picturegoer, gave the film a two-star review and wrote, "Romance, humour, sport and song are the ingredients of this bright, if conventional, plot. It has the merit of moving along briskly and is well interpreted by a capable and versatile cast." Collier mentioned Walter Kelly, Phil Regan and Evalyn Knapp as contributing the most effective performances.
