= USS Chilton =

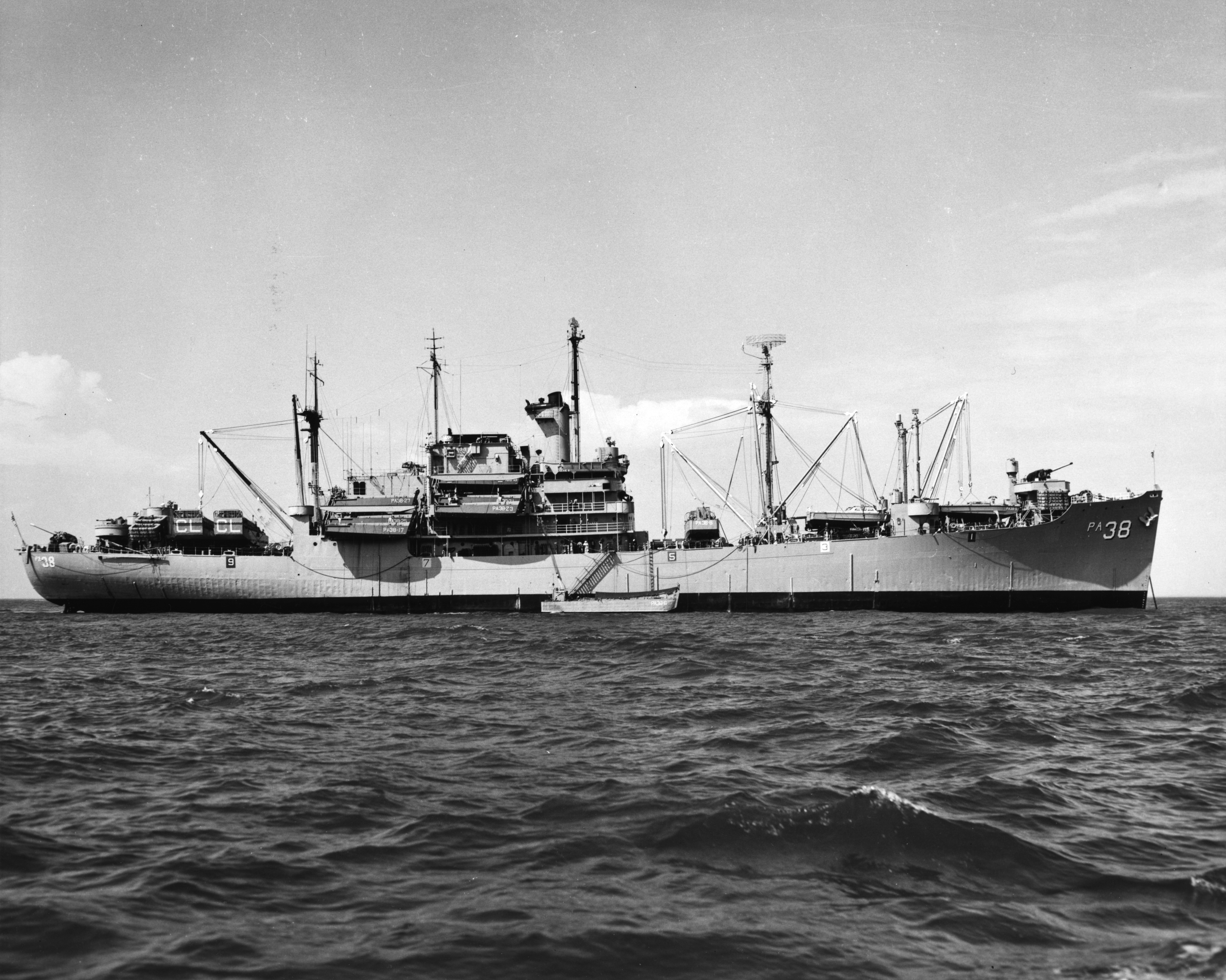

History

United States
- Namesake: Chilton County, Alabama
- Ordered: as SS Sea Needle, C3-S-A2 hull
- Laid down: 10 September 1942
- Launched: 29 December 1942
- Acquired: 29 May 1943
- Commissioned: USS Chilton (APA-38), 7 December 1943
- Decommissioned: August 1970
- Stricken: 1 July 1972
- Fate: Sold by MARAD, 15 July 1974

General characteristics
- Displacement: 8,100 t.(lt) 16,100 t.(fl)
- Length: 492 ft 6 in (150.11 m)
- Beam: 69 ft 6 in (21.18 m)
- Draught: 26 ft 6 in (8.08 m)
- Propulsion: General Electric geared turbine, two Combustion Engineering D-type boilers, single propeller, Design shaft horsepower 8,500
- Boats & landing craft carried: 4 LCM (Mk-6); 12 LCVP; 3 LCP(L) (Mk-4)
- Capacity: 200,000 cu. ft., 4,700 t.
- Complement: 51 Officers, 524 Enlisted; Flag: 43 Officers, 108 Enlisted
- Armament: two single 5 in (130 mm) dual purpose gun mounts one fore and one aft; two single 40 mm AA gun mounts; two twin 40 mm AA gun mounts; eighteen single 20 mm AA gun mounts

USS Chilton (APA-38) was a Bayfield-class attack transport. Her task was to deliver troops to the battle front, and to recover and care for the wounded. She served in the Pacific Ocean in the war against the Empire of Japan and returned home post-war with one battle star to her credit.

Chilton (APA-38) was launched 29 December 1942 by the Western Pipe and Steel Company, San Francisco, California, under a Maritime Commission contract, as SS Sea Needle; sponsored by Mrs.Henry A Reilly Jr. (Matilda); acquired by the Navy 29 May 1943; converted at New York Navy Yard; and commissioned 7 December 1943.

== World War II Pacific Theatre operations ==
Chilton served at Newport, Rhode Island, as a training ship for pre-commissioning crews of attack transports from 31 January 1943 to 15 October 1944. She sailed from Boston, Massachusetts, 20 November for San Diego, California, before arriving at Pearl Harbor 23 January 1945. Here she embarked troops, and sailed by way of Eniwetok and Ulithi, to Leyte, arriving 21 February. After rehearsal landings, Chilton put out of Leyte 16 March to land troops at Kerama Retto 26 March in a key preliminary to the assault on Okinawa. On 2 April, she was hit by a Kamikaze attack. She remained off Okinawa as flagship for Transport Squadron 17 supporting the establishment and reinforcement of beachheads until 30 April, departing then for San Francisco and overhaul.

== Supporting the Okinawa invasion ==
Chilton returned to Ulithi 17 July 1945 to load troops and cargo for Okinawa, where she lay until 31 August. From then until 8 December, when she arrived at Seattle, Washington, Chilton had duty in the redeployment of United States and Chinese troops, calling at Jinsen, Tianjin, Hong Kong, Qinhuangdao, Qingdao, and Nagoya. She cleared Seattle 21 December for the first of two "Operation Magic Carpet" voyages to the Philippines and Okinawa to carry home servicemen, returning from the second of these to San Francisco 10 May 1946.

== Supporting Bikini nuclear testing ==
She cleared San Francisco 2 June to participate in the atomic bomb tests at Bikini Atoll, returned to San Francisco 1 August, and sailed for transport duty in China and Japan from 7 September to 22 January 1947. She visited the Bikini area as a floating laboratory that summer, then returned to San Diego for local operations.

== Final operations ==
Chilton cleared San Diego, California, 15 November 1948 to withdraw U.S. Marines from China, returning to San Diego 31 May. Local operations and exercises in the Hawaiian Islands occupied her until 25 November 1949 when she sailed from San Diego for her new home port, Norfolk, Virginia, arriving 10 December. While based at Norfolk in 1951, she appeared at dock in the opening scenes of the film You're in the Navy Now.

Local operations, overhaul, and service as a training ship in Cuban waters preceded her first tour of duty in the Mediterranean, 11 June – 20 December 1951. On 21 August 1952, she sailed from Norfolk to participate in NATO Operation Mainbrace, proceeding to the Mediterranean for duty until 6 February 1953. Chilton continued to alternate local and Caribbean operations with tours of duty in the Mediterranean from 1954 through 1963. From 1 April, thru 9 June 1965, the Chilton participated in the Dominican Republic rebel uprising, with the crew of HMM-263 on board. The Chilton continued to do Mediterranean training operations throughout the late 1960s and early 1970s.

== Final decommissioning ==
Chilton was reclassified as an Amphibious transport (LPA-38), 1 January 1969 before being decommissioned on 1 July 1972. On 1 July 1972 she was struck from the Naval Register, and transferred to the Maritime Administration for lay up in the National Defense Reserve Fleet. On 15 July 1974 she was sold by MARAD to Ships Incorporated of Camden, New Jersey, for scrapping

== Military honors and awards ==
Chilton received one battle star for World War II service.
