= Oklahoma Annie =

1952 film

- Theatrical release poster
- Directed by: R. G. Springsteen
- Screenplay by: Jack Townley; Charles E. Roberts
- Story by: Jack Townley
- Produced by: Sidney Picker
- Starring: Judy Canova; John Russell; Grant Withers; Roy Barcroft; Emmett Lynn; Frank Ferguson
- Cinematography: Jack A. Marta
- Edited by: Richard L. Van Enger
- Music by: Nathan Scott
- Production company: Republic Pictures
- Distributed by: Republic Pictures
- Release date: March 24, 1952 (United States)
- Running time: 90 minutes
- Country: United States
- Language: English
- Budget: $325,961
- Box office: $652,335

Oklahoma Annie is a 1952 American comedy Western film directed by R. G. Springsteen and written by Jack Townley and Charles E. Roberts. The film stars Judy Canova, John Russell, Grant Withers, Roy Barcroft, Emmett Lynn and Frank Ferguson. The film was released on March 24, 1952 by Republic Pictures.

== Plot ==
General store owner Judy is fed up the crime in her county such as bank robbery and an illegal crooked gambling den that fleeces her two prospector friends. Taking after her grandmother, a western sheriff known as "Oklahoma Annie" to all, Judy manages to persuade new sheriff Dan Fraser to deputize her. After she helps capture bank robber Curt Walker, who's in cahoots with county supervisor Haskell, the sheriff feels confident enough in Judy to leave her in charge by herself while he rides to get the judge for Walker's trial.

Things instantly go wrong for Judy, whose shooting skills are so ineffective that she attempts to use fireworks instead. Walker gets away and Dan ends up in grave danger, but with all the men gone in a posse, Judy rounds up other women in town and together they ride to Dan's rescue in the guise of a volunteer fire department. After his rescue, Dan decides to take the county supervisor's job and appoints Judy as the new sheriff.

== Cast ==
- Judy Canova as Judy Canova
- John Russell as Dan Fraser
- Grant Withers as Bull McCready
- Roy Barcroft as Curt Walker
- Emmett Lynn as Paydirt
- Frank Ferguson as Eldridge Haskell
- Minerva Urecal as Mrs. Lottie Fling
- Houseley Stevenson as Blinky
- Almira Sessions as Mrs. Carrie Fudge
- Allen Jenkins as Lou
- Maxine Gates as Tillie
- Emory Parnell as Judge Byrnes
- Denver Pyle as Skip
- House Peters, Jr. as Jim Tullett
- Andrew Tombes as Mayor of Eureka
- Fuzzy Knight as Larry
- Si Jenks as Old Man

== Reception ==
After distribution, advertising and prints the film recorded a loss of $172,550.
