= Key Largo (play) =

1939 Broadway play by Maxwell Anderson

- Written by: Maxwell Anderson
- Original language: English
- Genre: Drama
- Setting: hilltop in Spain, wharf in Key Largo, Florida, D'Alcala's house in January 1939

Premiere
- Date premiered: November 27, 1939
- Place premiered: Ethel Barrymore Theatre; New York City, New York

Key Largo was a 1939 Broadway play written in blank verse by Maxwell Anderson that became the basis for the 1948 film by the same name. The play ran for 105 performances in 1939 at the Ethel Barrymore Theatre from November 27, 1939 to February 24, 1940. It was produced by the Playwrights' Company and staged by Guthrie McClintic, with scenic design created by noted designer Jo Mielziner. This was actor James Gregory's Broadway debut, playing the character "Jerry".

The rights to the play were bought by producer Jerry Wald. Wald convinced maverick film director John Huston to turn this into the 1948 film Key Largo starring Humphrey Bogart, Edward G. Robinson, and Lauren Bacall.

The film script was heavily changed from the play. John Huston was so angry about the deficiencies in the play that he barred producer Jerry Wald from the set of the film. It was believed that Huston was in a rage over the House Un-American Activities Committee (HUAC) hearings and didn't want to adapt a play by a reactionary who hated Franklin Delano Roosevelt.

== Plot ==
A deserter of the Spanish Civil War played by Paul Muni redeems himself in death by defending the family of a true war hero against some Mexican bandits on the tiny Florida island of Key Largo.

== Cast ==
- Paul Muni as King McCloud
- José Ferrer as Victor D'Alcala
- Uta Hagen as Alegre D'Alcala
- Crahan Denton as Gage
- James Gregory as Jerry
- Ethel Jackson as Mrs. Wheeler
- Karl Malden as Hunk
- Evelyn Abbott as Priscilla
- Richard Barbee as Mr. Wheeler
- Richard Bishop as Mr. Aaronson
- William Challee as Osceola Horn
- Richard Cowdery as Corky
- Charles Ellis as Nimmo
- Alfred Etcheverry as Monte
- Goldie Hannelin as Mrs. Aaronson
- Averell Harris as John Horn
- Harold Johnsrud as D'Alcala
- Ruth March as Killarney
- John Fearnley as first man tourist
- Norma Millay as first woman tourist
- Helen Carroll as second woman tourist
- Hudson Shotwell as Sam
- Ralph Theodore as Sherriff Gash
- Frederic Tozere as Murillo
