= Larceny (1948 film) =

1948 film by George Sherman

- Theatrical release poster
- Directed by: George Sherman
- Screenplay by: William Bowers; Louis Morheim; Herbert H. Margolis
- Based on: The Velvet Fleece; 1947 novel by Lois Eby; John Fleming
- Produced by: Leonard Goldstein
- Starring: John Payne; Joan Caulfield; Dan Duryea; Shelley Winters
- Cinematography: Irving Glassberg
- Edited by: Frank Gross
- Music by: Leith Stevens
- Production company: Universal Pictures
- Distributed by: Universal Pictures
- Release date: September 3, 1948 (United States)
- Running time: 89 minutes
- Country: United States
- Language: English

Larceny is a 1948 American film noir crime film directed by George Sherman starring John Payne, Joan Caulfield, Dan Duryea, and Shelley Winters.

== Plot ==
Con man Rick Maxon (Payne) tries to swindle war widow Deborah (Caulfield) into giving up her savings for a non-existent memorial. When Rick falls in love with Deborah he has pangs of remorse, but he must contend with his gang boss, Silky (Duryea) and the tough-as-nails moll, Tory (Winters), who is enamored with Rick but is Silky's girl.

== Cast ==
- John Payne as Rick Maxon
- Joan Caulfield as Deborah Owens Clark
- Dan Duryea as Silky Randall
- Shelley Winters as Tory
- Dorothy Hart as Madeline
- Richard Rober as Max
- Dan O'Herlihy as Duke
- Nicholas Joy as Walter Vanderline
- Percy Helton as Charlie Jordan
- Walter Greaza as Mr. Owens
- Patricia Alphin as Waitress
- Harry Antrim as Mr. McNulty
- Russ Conway as Detective
- Paul Brinegar as Mechanic
- Don Wilson as Master of Ceremonies

== Production ==
This was the first movie appearance of character actor Paul Brinegar, as a mechanic near the end of the film.
