= Irving Glassberg =

Polish-American cinematographer

- Born: October 19, 1906; Congress Poland, Russian Empire
- Died: September 9, 1958 (aged 51); Los Angeles, California, U.S.
- Occupation: Cinematographer

Irving Glassberg, A.S.C. (19 October 1906 – 9 September 1958) was a Polish-American cinematographer, who worked on many Universal Pictures during the forties and fifties. Glassberg, along with Arthur Lubin was responsible for getting Clint Eastwood into the movies.

== Partial filmography ==
Year	Title	Role	Notes
1959	Cry Tough		
1959	The Rabbit Trap		
1958	Twilight for the Gods		
1958	The Big Beat		
1958	Day of the Bad Man		
1958	The Lady Takes a Flyer		
1958	The Tarnished Angels		
1957	Joe Butterfly		
1957	Four Girls in Town		
1956	Showdown at Abilene		
1956	The Rawhide Years		
1956	Outside the Law		
1956	Backlash		
1956	The Price of Fear		
1955	The Purple Mask		
1955	Captain Lightfoot		
1954	The Black Shield of Falworth		
1954	Francis Joins the WACS		
1954	Ride Clear of Diablo		
1954	Border River		
1953	Walking My Baby Back Home		
1953	The Mississippi Gambler		
1953	The Lawless Breed		
1952	The Black Castle		
1952	The Duel at Silver Creek		
1952	Sally and Saint Anne		
1952	Flesh and Fury		
1952	Here Come the Nelsons		
1952	Bend of the River		
1951	The Strange Door		
1951	Cave of Outlaws		
1951	The Prince Who Was a Thief		
1951	The Fat Man		
1951	Francis Goes to the Races		
1950	Kansas Raiders		
1950	Shakedown		
1950	Spy Hunt		
1950	I Was a Shoplifter		
1950	Francis		
1950	Outside the Wall		
1949	Undertow		
1949	The Story of Molly X		
1949	Sword in the Desert		
1949	Arctic Manhunt		
1949	Yes Sir, That's My Baby		
1949	Calamity Jane and Sam Bass		
1949	Red Canyon		
1948	Larceny		
1948	Feudin', Fussin' and A-Fightin'		
1948	River Lady		
1948	Casbah		
1948	Black Bart		
1947	The Web		

== Bibliography ==
- McGilligan, Patrick (1999). Clint: The Life and Legend. HarperCollins. ISBN 0-00-638354-8.
