= Tarzan's Savage Fury =

1952 film by Cy Endfield

- Directed by: Cy Endfield
- Written by: Hans Jacoby
- Based on: Characters created by Edgar Rice Burroughs
- Produced by: Sol Lesser
- Starring: Lex Barker; Dorothy Hart; Patric Knowles
- Cinematography: Karl Struss
- Edited by: Frank Sullivan
- Music by: Paul Sawtell
- Distributed by: RKO Pictures
- Release date: April 11, 1952 (US)
- Running time: 81 minutes
- Country: United States
- Language: English

Tarzan's Savage Fury is a 1952 film directed by Cy Endfield and starring Lex Barker as Tarzan, Dorothy Hart as Jane, and Patric Knowles, serving as the sixteenth film of the Tarzan film series that began with 1932's Tarzan the Ape Man. While most Tarzan films of this series in the 1930s, 1940s and 1950s presented Tarzan as a very different character from the one in Edgar Rice Burroughs' novels, this movie does make some allusions to the novels. It was shot in Chatsworth, California's Iverson Movie Ranch. The film was the last to be directed by Cyril "Cy" Endfield in the US. Finding himself one of Hollywood's film-makers blacklisted by the House Un-American Activities Committee he moved to Britain. The film was co-written by Cyril Hume, who'd contributed substantially to the "Tarzan" series back in its bigger budget MGM days. At 81 minutes, this is the longest Tarzan film since Tarzan's Secret Treasure in 1941. The film was followed by Tarzan and the She-Devil in 1953.

== Plot ==
Tarzan agrees, against his better judgement, to guide supposed British government agents Edwards and Rokov into the land of the Wazuri Tribe, to harvest uncut diamonds for national-defense purposes. It transpires the "agents" are secretly criminals who intend to use the gems for their own sinister purposes.

== Cast ==
- Lex Barker as Tarzan
- Dorothy Hart as Jane
- Patric Knowles as Edwards, a British traitor
- Charles Korvin as Rokov, a Russian agent
- Tommy Carlton as Joseph 'Joey' Martin
- Wesley Bly as Native Captive (uncredited)
- Darby Jones as Witch Doctor (uncredited)
- Peter Mamakos as Pilot (uncredited)
- Bill Walker as Native Chief (uncredited)

== Production ==
The film was originally known as Tarzan, the Hunted.

== Critical reception ==
Variety wrote that the film was, "A series of unexciting jungle heroics are offered..." Recent TV guides for re-run viewers say little more. The Radio Times wrote that "plenty of action helps the story along", and TV Guide wrote that the film was "uninteresting and slowly paced."
