= Henry Slate =

American film, television and theatre actor

- Slate in Miss Sadie Thompson (1953)
- Born: Henry Sonken; July 15, 1910; Brooklyn, New York, U.S.
- Died: August 11, 1996 (aged 86); Los Angeles, California, U.S.
- Occupations: Film, television and theatre actor
- Years active: 1930–1985
- Children: 1

Henry Sonken (July 15, 1910 – August 11, 1996) was an American film, television and theatre actor. Often appearing as one of the Slate Bros, he was known for his appearances in the films Miss Sadie Thompson, Loan Shark, Hey Boy! Hey Girl!, Somebody Loves Me and Rock Around the Clock, and for playing the role of Bulldog Lovey in the American television series Adventures in Paradise.

Slate died on August 11, 1996, in Los Angeles, California, at the age of 86. He was cremated.

== Partial filmography ==
- College Swing (1938) - Hangout Waiter (credited as "The Slate Brothers")
- Winged Victory (1944) - Andrews Sister
- You're in the Navy Now (1951) - Chief Engineer Ryan
- Fourteen Hours (1951) - Cab Driver (uncredited)
- The Frogmen (1951) - Sleepy
- Rhubarb (1951) - Dud Logan
- The Belle of New York (1952) - Police Sgt. Clancy (uncredited)
- Just This Once (1952) - Jeff Parma
- Loan Shark (1952) - Paul Nelson
- Down Among the Sheltering Palms (1952) - Pvt. Thompson (uncredited)
- O. Henry's Full House (1952) - Poker Player (uncredited)
- Somebody Loves Me (1952) - Forrest
- Bloodhounds of Broadway (1952) - Dave the Dudge
- Stop, You're Killing Me (1952) - Ryan
- The Jazz Singer (1952) - Master of Ceremonies (uncredited)
- Pickup on South Street (1953) - Detective MacGregor (uncredited)
- A Slight Case of Larceny (1953) - Motor Cop
- Three Sailors and a Girl (1953) - Hank the Sailor
- Miss Sadie Thompson (1953) - Pvt. Griggs
- There's No Business Like Show Business (1954) - Dance Director (uncredited)
- Three for the Show (1955) - Sgt. Kowalski (uncredited)
- Hit the Deck (1955) - Shore Patrol
- My Sister Eileen (1955) - Second Drunk
- Meet Me in Las Vegas (1956) - Henry Slate (The Slate Brothers)
- Rock Around the Clock (1956) - Corny LaSalle
- He Laughed Last (1956) - Ziggy
- Bus Stop (1956) - Manager of Blue Dragon Nightclub (uncredited)
- Wink of an Eye (1958) - Attendant
- Hey Boy! Hey Girl! (1959) - Marty Moran
- The Andy Griffith Show (1960, TV series) S1/E3 "The Guitar Player" - Bobby Fleet
- Bedtime Story (1964) - Sattler
- The Patsy (1964) - Paul
- Looking for Love (1964) - Henry (uncredited)
- A Big Hand for the Little Lady (1966) - Piano Player (uncredited)
- Which Way to the Front? (1970) - German Officer (uncredited)
- Pete 'n' Tillie (1972) - Desk Sergeant (uncredited)
- The Strongest Man in the World (1975) - Mr. Slate
- Gus (1976) - Fan
- The Shootist (1976) - Pufford Confidant (uncredited)
- The Shaggy D.A. (1976) - Taxi Driver
- Pete's Dragon (1977) - Fisherman #2
- Barney Miller (1978) - Louis Frankel
- The Cat from Outer Space (1978) - Sandwich Man
- Norma Rae (1979) - Policeman
- Little Miss Marker (1980) - Teller
- Herbie Goes Bananas (1980) - Off-Watch Officer
- Back Roads (1981) - Grover
- Beyond Reason (1985) - Julius
- Murphy's Romance (1985) - Fred Hite
