= Key Largo (film) =

1948 film noir crime drama

- Australian theatrical release poster
- Directed by: John Huston
- Screenplay by: Richard Brooks; John Huston
- Based on: Key Largo; 1939 play by Maxwell Anderson
- Produced by: Jerry Wald
- Starring: Humphrey Bogart; Edward G. Robinson; Lauren Bacall; Lionel Barrymore; Claire Trevor; Thomas Gomez; John Rodney
- Cinematography: Karl Freund
- Edited by: Rudi Fehr
- Music by: Max Steiner
- Production company: Warner Bros. Pictures
- Distributed by: Warner Bros. Pictures
- Release date: July 16, 1948
- Running time: 101 minutes
- Country: United States
- Language: English
- Budget: $1.8 million
- Box office: $3.3 million (US/Canada rentals) $4.4 million (worldwide)

Key Largo is a 1948 American film noir crime drama directed by John Huston and starring Humphrey Bogart, Edward G. Robinson and Lauren Bacall. The supporting cast features Lionel Barrymore and Claire Trevor. The film was adapted by Richard Brooks and Huston from Maxwell Anderson's 1939 play of the same name.

Key Largo was the fourth and final film pairing of actors Bogart and Bacall, after To Have and Have Not (1944), The Big Sleep (1946), and Dark Passage (1947). Claire Trevor won the Academy Award for Best Supporting Actress at the 21st Academy Awards in 1948 for her portrayal of alcoholic former nightclub singer Gaye Dawn.

== Plot ==
Original release trailer of the film Key Largo (1948)

Army veteran Frank McCloud arrives at the Hotel Largo in Key Largo, Florida, visiting the family of George Temple, a friend who served under him and was killed in the Italian campaign several years earlier. He meets with the friend's widow, Nora Temple, and father, James, who owns the hotel. Because the winter vacation season has ended and a hurricane is approaching, the hotel has only six guests: dapper Edward "Toots" Bass, boorish Richard "Curly" Hoff, stone-faced Ralph Feeney, servant Angel Garcia, attractive but aging alcoholic Gaye Dawn, and a sixth man who remains secluded in his room. The visitors claim to be in the Florida Keys for fishing.

Frank tells Nora and James about George's heroism under fire and shares some small and cherished details that George had spoken of. Nora and her father-in-law seem taken with Frank, stating that George frequently mentioned Frank in his letters.

While preparing the hotel for the hurricane, the three are interrupted by Sheriff Ben Wade and his deputy Clyde Sawyer. They are searching for John and Tom Osceola, a pair of fugitive American Indian brothers. Soon after the police leave, the local Seminoles seek shelter at the hotel, among them the Osceola brothers.

As the storm approaches, Curly, Ralph, Angel, and Toots pull guns and take the Temples and Frank hostage. They explain that the sixth, reclusive member of their party, is the notorious gangster Johnny Rocco – who was exiled to Cuba some years before. Rocco is waiting for his Miami contacts to arrive to conclude a deal. The gang discovers Deputy Sawyer looking about, and they capture him. A tense standoff ensues. Frank declines to fight a duel with Rocco, stating his belief in self-preservation over heroics and that "one Rocco more or less isn't worth dying for”. Rocco shoots Sawyer, and Rocco's men take Sawyer's body out on a rowing boat in the approaching storm to bury it at sea.

As the storm rages outside, Rocco forces his former moll, Gaye, to sing to them for a drink but then demeans her. In contrast, Frank politely gives her the promised drink and ignores Rocco's slaps. Nora understands that Frank's heroism matches her husband's, who was killed around Monte Cassino in Italy. Mr. Temple invites Frank to live with them at the hotel, a prospect that intrigues Nora.

The storm finally subsides. Sheriff Wade returns looking for Deputy Sawyer, and discovers his body washed up by the storm on the hotel driveway. Rocco goes outside and convinces Sheriff Wade that the Osceola brothers are responsible for Sawyer's death. Wade confronts and kills them both before leaving with Sawyer's body. Rocco's contact Ziggy arrives to buy a large amount of counterfeit money. Rocco then forces Frank, who is a skilled seaman, to take him and his henchmen back to Cuba on the small hotel boat. As the gang prepares to board the boat, Gaye steals Rocco's gun and covertly passes it to Frank.

Out on the Straits of Florida, Frank uses seamanship, trickery, and the stolen gun to kill the gang members one by one. He then heads back to Key Largo, while radioing for Coast Guard help and to get a message to the hotel. Meanwhile, Gaye tells Wade that Rocco bears the blame for Deputy Sawyer's murder. Wade mentions that Ziggy's gang has been captured and leaves with Gaye to identify them.

The phone rings: James and Nora are delighted to hear that Frank is returning safely. Nora opens the shutters to the sun – while out at sea, Frank steers the boat towards shore.

== Cast ==
- Humphrey Bogart as Maj. Frank "Soldier" McCloud
- Edward G. Robinson as Johnny Rocco/Howard Brown
- Lauren Bacall as Nora Temple
- Lionel Barrymore as James Temple
- Claire Trevor as Gaye Dawn
- Thomas Gomez as Richard "Curly" Hoff
- Harry Lewis as Edward "Toots" Bass
- John Rodney as Deputy Sheriff Clyde Sawyer
- Marc Lawrence as Ziggy
- Dan Seymour as Angel Garcia
- Monte Blue as Sheriff Ben Wade
- William Haade as Ralph Feeney

In addition, Jay Silverheels and Rodd Redwing appear in uncredited roles as John and Tom Osceola, respectively.

== Production ==
The script was adapted from a 1939 play of the same name by Maxwell Anderson. In the play, the gangsters are Mexican bandidos, the war in question is the Spanish Civil War, and Frank McCloud is a disgraced deserter who dies at the end.

Edward G. Robinson had always had top billing over Humphrey Bogart in their four previous films together: Bullets or Ballots (1936), Kid Galahad (1937), The Amazing Dr. Clitterhouse (1938) and Brother Orchid (1940), but the situation switched for the billing in this final film in which Bogart and Robinson worked together. In at least one trailer for the film, however, Robinson is billed above Bogart in a list of the actors' names at the end of the preview, and photographs exist of Robinson being billed above Bogart on some theatre marquees. In the film itself and in posters, Robinson's name is between Bogart's and Lauren Bacall's but slightly higher than the other two. In some posters, Robinson's picture is substantially larger than Bogart's, and in the foreground manhandling Bacall while Bogart is in the background.

The film was shot primarily at the Warner Bros. Studios, Burbank, in order to keep costs down. The beach and hotel exterior were constructed on the Warner Bros. backlot; the interior scenes were filmed on a sound stage; and the boat scenes were filmed in Sound Stage 21, a huge indoor water tank. Exterior shots of the hurricane were taken from stock footage used in Night Unto Night, a Ronald Reagan melodrama which Warner Bros. Pictures also produced either in 1948 or 1949. Filming took 78 days.

The boat used by Johnny Rocco's (Robinson) gang to depart Key Largo, with Frank (Bogart) at the helm, is named the Santana, which was also the name of Bogart's personal 55-foot (17 m) sailing yacht.

== Reception ==
Variety wrote that "Emphasis is on tension in the telling...There are overtones of soapboxing on a better world but this is never permitted to interfere with basic plot." Bosley Crowther demurred, "The script prepared by Mr. Huston and Richard Brooks was too full of words and highly cross-purposed implications to give the action full chance." In The Nation, James Agee expected more from John Huston: " ... I rather doubt anyhow whether gangsters can be made to represent all that he meant them to – practically everything that is fundamentally wrong with post-war America; so the picture is weak in the way it was obviously intended to be strongest." Leslie Halliwell gave it three of four stars, stating: "Moody melodrama on similar lines to To Have and Have Not: it sums up the post-war mood of despair, allows several good acting performances, and builds up to a pretty good action climax." Pauline Kael wrote, "Huston fills the rancid atmosphere of the setting—a hotel in the Florida Keys—with suspense, ambiguous motives, and some hilariously hammy bits, and the cast all go at it as if the nonsense about gangsters and human dignity were high drama."

On Rotten Tomatoes, Key Largo currently holds a 97% rating based on 36 reviews with the consensus: "Humphrey Bogart and Lauren Bacall are at the mercy of Edward G. Robinson's menacing gangster -- and so is the audience in this enthralling chamber piece." On Metacritic, it has a score of 74 out of 100 based on reviews from 11 critics, indicating "generally favorable" reviews.

== Song ==
A high point of the film comes when Rocco's alcoholic former moll Gaye Dawn (Claire Trevor) is forced to sing a song a cappella before he will allow her to have a drink. Trevor was nervous about the scene and assumed that she would be lip-syncing to someone else's voice. She kept after director Huston to rehearse the song, but he put her off: "There's plenty of time." One afternoon, he told her that they would shoot the scene right then, without any rehearsal. She was given her starting note from a piano, and then sang in front of the rest of the cast and the crew. It was this raw take that was used in the film. The song was "Moanin' Low," composed by Ralph Rainger with lyrics by Howard Dietz, introduced on Broadway in the 1929 revue The Little Show by Libby Holman. It became a hit and was Holman's signature song.

Author Philip Furia, whose books focus on the lyricists of the Tin Pan Alley era, writes that the song is about a woman who is trapped in a relationship with a cruel man, and Gaye slowly realizes as she is singing that she is in that very situation herself. He suggests that Trevor's performance in the role slowly breaks down during the song: "Her voice falters and she sings off key." After the song, Rocco refuses Gaye her drink, saying: "You were rotten". Frank silently goes behind the bar, pours her a drink, to which Gaye says: "Thanks, fella". Rocco slaps Frank several times, then Frank says: "You're welcome" and quietly sits near Nora Temple (Bacall). "It's a wonderful use of a song in a non-musical picture," according to Furia. He also suggests that Trevor won the Academy Award for Best Supporting Actress "based purely, I think, on that performance."

== Box office ==
According to Warner Bros. records, the film earned $3,219,000 domestically and $1,150,000 foreign.

== Awards and honors ==
Award	Category	Subject	Result
Academy Awards	Best Supporting Actress	Claire Trevor	Won
Writers Guild of America Awards	Best Written American Drama	Richard Brooks and John Huston	Nominated
AFI	Top 10 Gangster Films list		Nominated

== Colorization ==
A colorized version of the film was shown on WTBS in November 1988 immediately after a controversial debut screening of a colorized version of Casablanca. Screenwriter Richard Brooks said he was sorry that Ted Turner had colorized his film and that he didn't want to watch it.

== Home media ==
MGM released the VHS format on February 11, 1997, while Warner Archive Collection released the Blu-ray version and DVD reissue on February 23, 2016, and May 8, 2018, respectively.

== Adaptation ==
Lux Radio Theatre presented an adaptation of Key Largo on November 28, 1949, starring Robinson, Trevor, and Edmond O'Brien.

== See also ==
- John Huston filmography
- List of films featuring home invasions
