= Harvey Lembeck =

American actor (1923–1982)

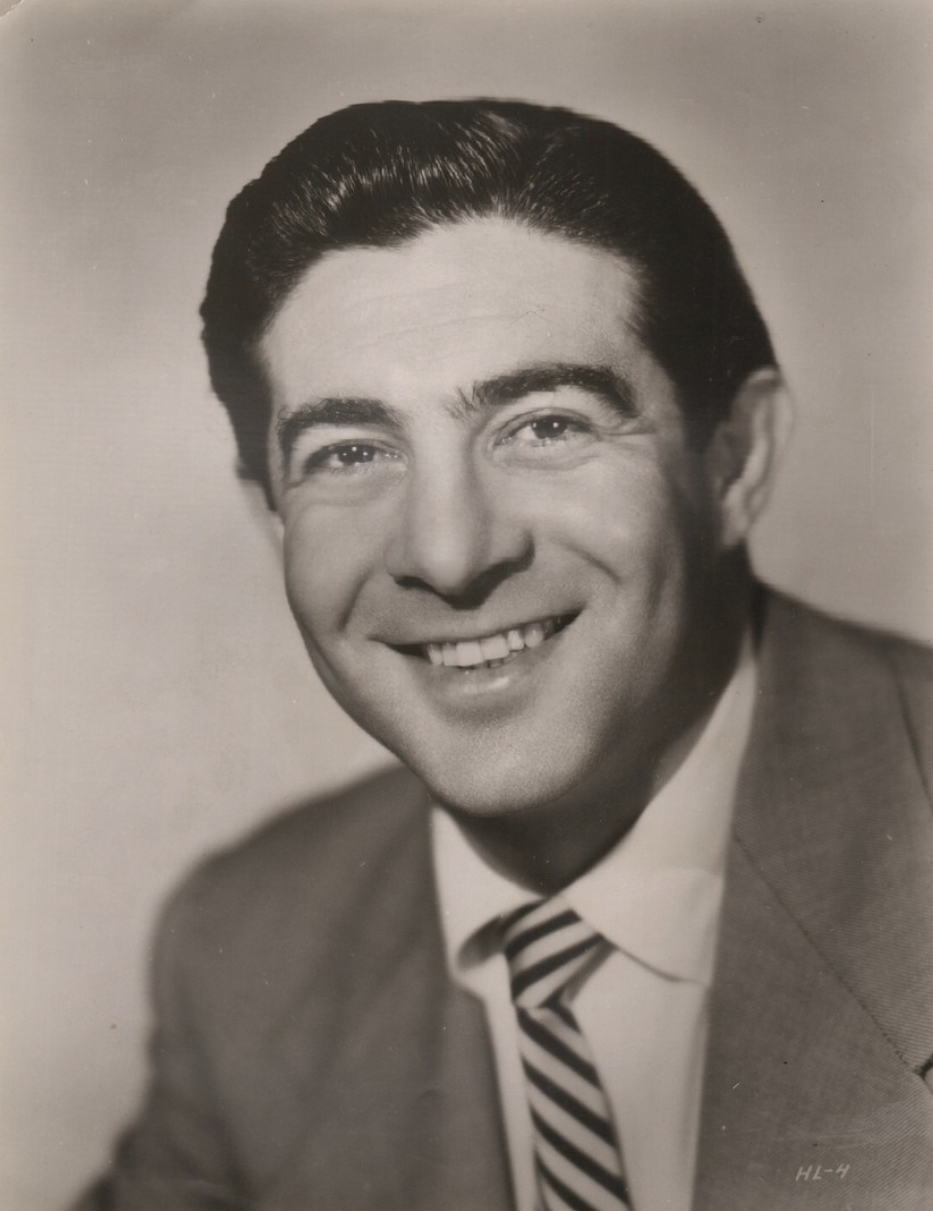
- Lembeck in 1954
- Born: April 15, 1923; Brooklyn, New York City, U.S.
- Died: January 6, 1982 (aged 58); Los Angeles, California, U.S.
- Occupation: Actor
- Years active: 1947–1982
- Spouse: Caroline Dubs
- Children: 2, including Michael Lembeck

Harvey Lembeck (April 15, 1923 – January 6, 1982) was an American comedic actor best remembered for his role as Cpl. Rocco Barbella on The Phil Silvers Show (a.k.a. Sgt. Bilko, a.k.a. You'll Never Get Rich) in the late 1950s, and as the stumbling, overconfident quasi-outlaw biker Eric Von Zipper in beach party films during the 1960s. He also turned in noteworthy performances in both the stage and screen versions of Stalag 17. He was the father of actor and director Michael Lembeck and actress Helaine Lembeck.

== Early life, family and education ==
Lembeck was born in Brooklyn, New York City, New York, to a Jewish family. His father was a button manufacturer in Brooklyn. At New Utrecht High School in Brooklyn, he was class president, graduating in 1941.

Lembeck started his career during high school as a dancer at the 1939–40 New York World's Fair as half of an exhibition dance team known as The Dancing Carrolls. His partner, Caroline Dubs, became his wife.

Lembeck yearned for a career as a radio sports announcer. Following his discharge from the US Navy at the end of World War II (having served from 1943 to 1945), he attended New York University, obtaining a bachelor's degree in radio arts in 1947. However, he chose the stage as a career upon the advice of one of his instructors, Prof. Robert Emerson, who had seen him perform in college plays.

== Career ==
=== 1940s and 1950s ===
Two weeks after graduation, Lembeck won the role of Sam Insigna in Mister Roberts, which he played on Broadway for nearly three years.

Lembeck made three films for 20th Century Fox: You're in the Navy Now, Fourteen Hours, and The Frogmen, all released in the first half of 1951. He went back to Broadway as Sgt. Harry Shapiro in Stalag 17, subsequently playing the same role in the film version directed by Billy Wilder, earning the Theater Owners of America's Laurel Award for outstanding comedy performance and best possibility for stardom. From 1952 to 1954 Lembeck also made nine other films, mostly playing military stereotypes. However, the role of Harry Shapiro as portrayed by Lembeck was significant, as it demonstrated the resiliency of the average American under the extreme duress as a prisoner of war during WWII.

In 1954, he returned to Broadway, appearing in the play Wedding Breakfast. That same year, he appeared with Skip Homeier in the episode "Eye for an Eye" of the NBC legal drama Justice, based on case studies of the Legal Aid Society of New York. His stint with Phil Silvers's popular Sergeant Bilko series began in 1955. Lembeck played Bilko's sidekick, Corporal Rocco Barbella. The show ran for four years.

Lembeck also performed onstage in 1955 in the musical revue Phoenix '55, played Luther Billis in the 1957 production of South Pacific and from 1959 to 1961 was the standby for the role of Fiorello LaGuardia in the musical Fiorello!.

=== 1960s and 1970s ===
In the 1961–1962 television season, Lembeck played a theatrical agent, Jerry Roper, in the ABC sitcom The Hathaways, starring Peggy Cass and Jack Weston as "parents" to the performing Marquis Chimps. He appeared twice as Al in "Variations on a Theme" and "Music Hath Charms" (both 1961) on another ABC sitcom, The Donna Reed Show.

Having spent a great deal of his adult life in uniform, Lembeck once again donned Navy togs in the 1962–1963 season to co-star with Dean Jones in the NBC sitcom Ensign O'Toole. He co-starred with Steve McQueen in Love with the Proper Stranger and then spent part of the early 1960s playing the lovable bad guy malaprop Eric Von Zipper in six American International beach party films, with Frankie Avalon and Annette Funicello. (He did not appear in the second "beach" film, 1964's Muscle Beach Party.) The Von Zipper character, leader of the Rat Pack motorcycle gang, was a parody of Marlon Brando's role in The Wild One (Von Zipper reveals in Beach Blanket Bingo that one of his idols was "Marlo Brandon".) Among other things, Von Zipper pronounced his judgments on others by saying "Him, I like", or "Him, I do not like". He was called an "instant audience favorite". In 1964, he also co-starred with Debbie Reynolds in The Unsinkable Molly Brown.

In 1964, Jack Kosslyn of the Mercury Theatre asked Lembeck to take over his actors' workshop. Lembeck took this opportunity to create his comedy workshop. Initially working with comedy scripts, he soon ran out of good comedy material and found that improv was a wonderful tool to teach and exercise comedy. He realized that the improv method, new in the early 1960s, was one of the best ways to develop actors' comedy instincts. Lembeck returned to the theatre to star as Sancho Panza in the first national company of Man of La Mancha. President Lyndon Johnson chose this company to give a command performance at the White House.

During the late 1960s and 1970s, Lembeck became a mainstay on television, making over 200 guest appearances, including Ben Casey, Mr. Novak, The Munsters, The Man from U.N.C.L.E., Route 66, The Monkees, Night Gallery, It Takes a Thief, The Partridge Family, Chico and the Man, Vega$, All in the Family, Hawkins, Batman and Mork & Mindy.

Lembeck also directed the road companies of Stalag 17 and Mister Roberts, along with the revues A Night at the Mark in San Francisco and Flush in Las Vegas.

== Death ==
Lembeck had a heart attack on January 5, 1982, and died the next day at Cedars Sinai Hospital in Los Angeles. According to an Associated Press report on January 7, "Spokesman Larry Baum said Mr. Lembeck was admitted to the hospital Tuesday and died early Wednesday.". An episode of Mork & Mindy, titled "Pajama Game II", which included Lembeck as a guest star aired on Thursday, January 7, 1982 the day after his death, with Lembeck reprising a role he had played in another episode on December 17. The coincidence of his final appearance being scheduled on the same week as his death has given rise to a legend that Lembeck "collapsed as he was leaving the set" of the episode, which was taped weeks before it was telecast. The date of his death is sometimes given as January 6. In an interview taped shortly before his own death in 1985, Phil Silvers said he was shocked and saddened by the untimely death of his friend Lembeck, and missed him terribly.

== Theatrical appearances ==
- Mister Roberts (February 18, 1948–January 6, 1951, 1157 performances, at the Alvin Theatre) – Insigna (with Karl Lukas, Tige Andrews, Murray Hamilton, all from The Phil Silvers Show)
- Stalag 17 (May 8, 1951–June 21, 1952, 472 performances, at the 48th Street Theatre) – Sgt. Harry Shapiro (with Robert Strauss, Allan Melvin, Bob Shawley, all from The Phil Silvers Show; Strauss and Lembeck appeared in the filmed version)
- Wedding Breakfast (November 20, 1954–February 26, 1955, 113 performances, at the 48th Street Theatre) – Norman (with Lee Grant, and Tony Franciosa)
- Phoenix '55 (May 23, 1955–July 17, 1955, 97 performances, at the Phoenix Theatre; with Nancy Walker)
- South Pacific (April 24, 1955–December 5, 1955, 23 performances, at the New York City Center – Luther Billis)
- Oklahoma! (March 19, 1958–March 30, 1958, 16 performances, at New York City Center) – Ali Hakim
- Man of La Mancha – Sancho Panza (touring company, performed at the White House for President Lyndon B. Johnson)

== Selected filmography ==
- You're in the Navy Now (1951) - Norelli
- Fourteen Hours (1951) - Cab Driver (uncredited)
- The Frogmen (1951) - Marvin W. 'Canarsie' Mikowsky
- Finders Keepers (1952) - Undetermined Role
- Just Across the Street (1952) - Al
- Back at the Front, also known as Willie and Joe Back at the Front (1952) - Joe
- Girls in the Night (1953) - Chuck Haynes
- Stalag 17 (1953) - Sgt. Harry Shapiro
- Mission Over Korea (1953) - Sgt. Maxie Steiner
- The Command (1954) - Pvt. Gottschalk
- Between Heaven and Hell (1956) - Pvt. Bernard 'Bernie' Meleski - Co. G
- The Last Time I Saw Archie (1961) - Duty Sgt. Malcolm Greenbriar
- Sail a Crooked Ship (1961) - Nickels
- A View from the Bridge (1962) - Mike
- Beach Party (1963) - Eric Von Zipper
- Love with the Proper Stranger (1963) - Julio Rossini
- The Unsinkable Molly Brown (1964) - Polak
- Bikini Beach (1964) - Eric Von Zipper
- Pajama Party (1964) - Eric Von Zipper
- Beach Blanket Bingo (1965) - Eric Von Zipper
- How to Stuff a Wild Bikini (1965) - Eric Von Zipper
- Sergeant Deadhead (1965) - Airman McEvoy
- Dr. Goldfoot and the Bikini Machine (1965) - Motorcycle Thug in Dungeon
- The Ghost in the Invisible Bikini (1966) - Eric Von Zipper
- Fireball 500 (1966) - Charlie Bigg
- The Spirit Is Willing (1967) - Capt. Pederson (uncredited)
- Hello Down There (1969) - Sonarman
- A Likely Story (1973)
- There Is No 13 (1974) - Older George
- Raid on Entebbe (1976, TV Movie) - Mr. Harvey
- The Gong Show Movie (1980) - Man in Steam Room

== Television ==
Year	Title	Role	Notes
1955–59	The Phil Silvers Show	Cpl. Rocco Barbella, Indian Chief, Self	142 episodes
1962–63	Ensign O'Toole	Seaman Gabby Di Julio	31 episodes
1965	My Favorite Martian	Rembrandt Jones	S2:E38, "Portrait in Brown"
1966	The Monkees	Fuselli	S1:E11, "Monkees à la Carte"
1973–78	All in the Family	Sam, Wally	2 episodes
1978	CHiPs	Champagne truck driver	S1:E15, "Surf's Up"
1979	The Misadventures of Sheriff Lobo	Hank	S1:E8, "Buttercup, Birdie, and Buried Bucks"
1981–82	Mork & Mindy	Ovits	2 episodes
