= Mentone Productions =

Mentone Productions was a film company in the United States that produced short musical comedy films featuring a variety of performers. Milton Schwarzwald directed many of their films. In 1939, Schwarzwald moved on to producing musicals. Violinist Joseph Gershenson helped produce the films.

Rhapsody in Zoo features an MC dressed like Tarzan at a zoo with a stage and exhibitions by human performers. Musical acts presented include a female singer, novelty singing group, ballroom dance team, tap dancer, song performed by the host, and a finale with the Nagasaki Tramp Band of Harlem in front of animals that are clearly people dressed up in costume.

IMDb lists 78 films by Mentone Productions.

== Filmography ==
- Supper at Six (1933), a parody of Dinner at Eight
- All at Sea (1933)
- Soup for Nuts, Bob Hope as master of ceremonies
- World in Revolt (1934) an hour and 9 minute newsreel
- The Whale of a Show (1934)
- Desert Harmonies (1935)
- Rhapsody in Zoo (1937), extant and posted on YouTube
- Fun Begins at Home (1937)
- Bank Notes (1939)
- Pharmacy Frolics (1939)
- Bullets and Ballads (1940)
- Rhythm in a Night Court
