= You're in the Navy Now =

1951 film by Henry Hathaway

- Theatrical release poster
- Directed by: Henry Hathaway
- Screenplay by: Richard Murphy
- Based on: "The Flying Teakettle" by John W. Hazard
- Produced by: Fred Kohlmar
- Starring: Gary Cooper; Jane Greer; Millard Mitchell; Eddie Albert; John McIntire; Ray Collins; Harry von Zell; Jack Webb; Richard Erdman; Harvey Lembeck; Henry Slate; Ed Begley; Lee Marvin; Charles Bronson
- Cinematography: Joseph MacDonald
- Edited by: James B. Clark
- Music by: Cyril Mockridge
- Distributed by: Twentieth Century-Fox
- Release dates: February 23, 1951 (New York); April 11, 1951 (Los Angeles)
- Running time: 93 minutes
- Country: United States
- Language: English
- Box office: $1.6 million (U.S. rentals)

You're in the Navy Now is a 1951 American war/comedy film about the United States Navy in the first months of World War II. The film was directed by Henry Hathaway and stars Gary Cooper and Jane Greer. Charles Bronson, Lee Marvin and Harvey Lembeck appear in their film debuts in minor roles as crewmen. The screenplay was written by Richard Murphy based on an article written by John W. Hazard in The New Yorker.

The film was released by Twentieth Century-Fox under the title of U.S.S. Teakettle, but when the film failed to gain an audience, it was retitled.

== Plot ==
At Norfolk Naval Base in the opening months of World War II, newly commissioned lieutenant John W. Harkness bids farewell to his wife Ellie and reports aboard the PC-1168, unaware that his civilian background in engineering and Rutgers education have landed him the command of the ship for a secret project. The Navy has installed a steam engine and an experimental evaporator-condenser in the ship to try to increase the speed of patrol craft by 10 knots and has assigned Harkness to conduct the sea trials.

Boatswain's mate Chief Larrabee and the chief machinist's mate are the only experienced seamen aboard. PC-1168's crew are all newly inducted, and her officers are recently commissioned "90-day wonders". Lieutenant Bill Barron is a good-natured idea man whose knowledge of seamanship was learned from reading books. Engineering officer Tony Barbo has no training, education or experience in engineering. Mess officer Chuck Dorrance is plagued by seasickness.

After badly damaging the bow of the ship, Harkness and his officers clash with gruff Commander W.R. Reynolds, who oversees the project as the representative of Rear Admiral L.E. Tennant. After the first trial, the ship is towed to port, disparaged as the "U.S.S. Teakettle" by the rest of the base. Reynolds restricts the crew to the ship until the system is operational, and as the failures mount, the crew's morale plummets, threatening the entire project. Ellie, who is in the WAVES, relays information to her husband about Tennant's activities.

The officers scheme to enter a crewman in the base boxing championship to unite the crew, and they train engine-room sailor Wascylewski to represent the ship. The crew bets heavily on him, and to ensure that the submarine does not fail a sea trial scheduled for the day of the fight, smuggles distilled water aboard. Wascylewski breaks his ribs during the sea trial, forcing Barbo to replace him and surprisingly win the championship.

During the ship's official sea trial, the crew improvises a successful run, but the trial ends in humiliation when the ship rams an aircraft carrier. At the board of inquiry that follows, Tennant reveals to Harkness that the selection of his crew was no fluke. The Navy already knew that experts could run the system and it needed to learn whether novice sailors, who comprise the overwhelming percentage of the wartime Navy, could quickly learn to operate it.

The experimental steam power plant is replaced with a marine diesel. PC-1168 is then assigned to convoy escort duty in the North Atlantic.

== Cast ==
- Gary Cooper as Lieutenant John Harkness
- Jane Greer as Ensign Ellie Harkness
- Millard Mitchell as Chief George Larrabee
- Eddie Albert as Lieutenant (j.g.) Bill Barron
- John McIntire as Commander W.R. Reynolds
- Ray Collins as Rear Admiral L.E. Tennant
- Jack Webb as Ensign Tony Barbo
- Richard Erdman as Ensign Chuck Dorrance
- Charles Bronson as Wascylewski
- Harry von Zell as Captain Danny Eliot
- Ed Begley as Port Commander
- Harvey Lembeck as Seaman Norelli
- Lee Marvin as Signalman
- Jack Warden as Helmsman Morris
- Henry Slate as Engineer Ryan

== Production ==
The screenplay is based on the article "The Flying Teakettle" by John W. Hazard, which was printed in the January 21, 1950 issue of The New Yorker. The humorous story recounted incidents from Hazard's own World War II experience as captain of a diesel-powered warship. Although Hazard and his crew had little experience at sea, they were selected to participate in a Navy experimental program that ultimately ended in failure.

Upon purchasing the rights, Twentieth Century-Fox changed the title to U.S.S. Teakettle. Although neither director Henry Hathaway nor screenwriter Richard Murphy was adept at comedy, the studio relied on the humor of the storyline to carry the film.

Contract player William Lundigan was initially considered for the lead role of Harkness. When the budget was increased to include location filming at U.S. Navy yards in Virginia, the studio hired Gary Cooper to increase the audience appeal of the project. The film marked Cooper's first starring role for Twentieth Century-Fox, which had hired him as an extra in the 1925 silent film The Lucky Horseshoe. Joanne Dru was the studio's first choice for the character of Ellie Harkness, but when she declined to sign a long-term contract, Jane Greer was cast in the role.

The film marks the screen debuts of Lee Marvin, Charles Bronson and Harvey Lembeck and the second film appearance by Jack Warden.

You're in the Navy Now was filmed on location in Newport News, Virginia, at the Norfolk Naval Yard in Hampton Roads, Virginia and aboard the PC-1168 based there. Other ships appearing prominently in the film include USS Luzon (ARG-2), USS Albemarle (AV-5), USS Marquette (AKA-95), USS Fremont (APA-44), USS Chilton (APA-38), USS Roanoke (CL-145), USS Perry (DD-844),USS Vulcan (AR-5) and USS Mattabesset (AOG-52). With the exception of the Albemarle, all (including PC-1168) are anachronistic to the time period of the storyline.

== Release ==
U.S.S. Teakettle premiered at the Roxy Theater in New York on February 23, 1951. Twentieth Century-Fox launched a nationwide promotional tour featuring Gary Cooper, who also agreed to appear in the film's trailer.

Twentieth Century-Fox retitled the film You're in the Navy Now in March 1951 in response to sluggish box-office returns, and it was under that title that the film was released in major markets such as Los Angeles.

== Reception ==
In a contemporary review for The New York Times, critic Bosley Crowther wrote: "[I]t only seems fair to warn you that this farce about Navy men ... is the most explosively funny service picture that has come along since the nickelodeon versions of the sinking of the battleship Maine. ... Through Twentieth Century-Fox, which made this sparkler, they are contributing the best comedy of the year. It all boils down to a nice question of which will burst first—the Teakettle's engine or your sides."

Critic Philip K. Scheuer of the Los Angeles Times wrote: "It is filled with as laughable a collection of mishaps as ever befell any seagoing crew, Navy or otherwise, and they are made the more laughable because there is about them the sense that they must have happened very much like this."

Despite positive reviews, the film did not attract significant audiences. After the film was retitled, it fared slightly better at the box office, eventually returning a net loss of $122,000.

== Awards ==
Screenwriter Richard Murphy was nominated by the Writers Guild of America for Best Written American Comedy.

== Legacy ==
Arthur Curtis, author of the 1944 novel Hey, Mac! You're in the Navy Now, sued Twentieth Century-Fox for $100,000 in March 1953, claiming that the film's title infringed on that of his book. The case was decided in the studio's favor by a California superior court in July 1953, and a California Courts of Appeal court upheld the lower court's decision in April 1956.

== See also ==
- You're in the Army Now, a 1941 comedy film

== Sources ==
- Erickson, Hal (2012). Military Comedy Films: A Critical Survey and Filmography of Hollywood Releases Since 1918. McFarland. ISBN 9780786462902.
