= Loan Shark (film) =

1952 film by Seymour Friedman

- Theatrical release lobby card
- Directed by: Seymour Friedman
- Screenplay by: Eugene Ling; Martin Rackin
- Produced by: Bernard Luber
- Starring: George Raft; Dorothy Hart; Paul Stewart
- Cinematography: Joseph F. Biroc
- Edited by: Albrecht Joseph
- Music by: Heinz Roemheld
- Production company: Encore Productions
- Distributed by: Lippert Pictures
- Release dates: May 9, 1952 (Los Angeles); May 11, 1952 (New York)
- Running time: 80 minutes
- Country: United States
- Language: English
- Budget: $250,000

Loan Shark is a 1952 American crime film noir directed by Seymour Friedman and starring George Raft, Dorothy Hart and Paul Stewart.

== Plot ==
A vicious loan-sharking ring has infiltrated a tire factory and is terrorizing workers who borrow money from them. After several men are beaten, a union leader and the plant owner ask recently released convict Joe Gargan, who has been referred for a job in the plant by his brother-in-law, who is employed there, to help dismantle the gang. Joe refuses because he wants a clean, straight life and a relationship with the owner's secretary. He changes his mind when his brother-in-law is killed by the sharks. He eventually garners the trust of the underboss of the gang and lands a job with them. He works to eventually stop them, but he must keep his mission a secret, causing his rejection by both his sister and his girlfriend.

== Cast ==
- George Raft as Joe Gargen
- Dorothy Hart as Ann Nelson
- Paul Stewart as Lou Donelli
- John Hoyt as Vince Phillips
- Helen Westcott as Martha Gargen Haines
- Henry Slate as Paul Nelson
- Russell Johnson as Charlie Thompson
- Margia Dean as Ivy
- Benny Baker as Tubby
- Lawrence Dobkin as Walter Kerr
- Virginia Carroll as Netta Casmer
- Robert Bice as Steve Casmer
- George Eldredge as Mr. Howell
- Ross Elliott as Norm
- William Tannen as Rourke
- Harlan Warde as Lt. White
- Robert B. Williams as Scully
- Charles Meredith as F.L. Rennick
- William Edward Phipps as Ed Haines
- Barbara Woodell as Mrs. Hilton
- Robert Karnes as Police Lieutenant
- Claire Carleton as Nagging Wife

== Production ==
Martin Rackin wrote the original script for producer Louis Edelman at Warner Bros. in 1949. The project became the property of Lippert Pictures, an independent film company that had enjoyed success with second features and some more ambitious productions. It was the first production from a new arrangement between Robert Lippert and Famous Artists Corporation whereby clients of Famous Artists would produce films for Lippert to distribute. Facing a dwindling market for second features, Lippert was willing to sacrifice as much as 75% of the profits to entice screen talent. The film's writer, producer and director were all granted shares of its revenue.

Gail Russell was intended as the female lead but was withdrawn because of personal problems. George Raft was paid $25,000 plus 25% of the profits.

Filming began in late January 1952 at RKO-Pathé Studios and wrapped by the end of February.

== Reception ==
In a contemporary review for The New York Times, critic Howard Thompson wrote: "For all the pat format, this little picture isn't particularly hard to take. The director, Seymour Friedman, manages to pace the proceedings at a reasonable clip. The screen play by Eugene Ling and Martin Rackin not only affords the cast some brisk dialogue but stirs up a fair amount of suspense, particularly toward the climax ... For once, Mr. Raft's tight-lipped suavity seems perfectly in order ... 'Loan Shark,' while nothing special, could have been a lot worse."

Critic Edwin Schallert of the Los Angeles Times wrote: "'Loan Shark' ... will probably fill the bill for those who like this vigorous straight away sort of action film. It sustains its interest."
