= Soldiers of Fortune (TV series) =

- Genre: Adventure
- Starring: John Russell; Chick Chandler
- Theme music composer: Paul Dunlap
- Country of origin: United States
- Original language: English
- No. of seasons: 2
- No. of episodes: 52

Production
- Camera setup: Single-camera
- Running time: 22–24 minutes
- Production company: Revue Studios

Original release
- Network: Syndication
- Release: January 10, 1955 – March 10, 1957

Soldiers of Fortune is a syndicated half-hour American television adventure series that ran from 1955 to 1957. It starred John Russell as Tim Kelly and Chick Chandler as his sidekick Toubo Smith, who were international adventurers. Episodes take place in different countries. Many of the film crew had worked at Republic Pictures studios with the show filmed on Republic's backlot then used by television's Revue Productions. The series ran for 52 episodes, and was constantly rerun on American television into the 1960s.

== Cast ==
=== Main ===
- John Russell as Tim Kelly
- Chick Chandler as Toubo Smith

=== Guest stars ===
- Robert Anderson
- Frances Bavier
- Andy Clyde in "Hate at Forty Fathoms" (1955)
- Carol Thurston as Nari in "Massacre in Mokhara" (1956)
- Uncredited actors include Filipino Hollywood actor Rudy Robles acting on various roles.

== Production ==
The series began as a television pilot called Adventure in Java that was shown on the Chevron Theatre on 10 February 1953. The show starred Tim Holt and Charles Bronson then credited as Charles Buchinsky.

The show was sponsored for two years by 7 Up soft drink with the firm also sending the stars out on national publicity tours.

== DVD release ==
Timeless Media Group (TMG) released a Region 1 five-disc DVD set titled Soldiers of Fortune: The Complete Television Series on November 30, 2010. It includes all 29 episodes of season one and all 23 episodes of season two.
