= The Story of Molly X =

1949 film by Crane Wilbur

- Directed by: Crane Wilbur
- Written by: Crane Wilbur
- Produced by: Aaron Rosenberg
- Starring: June Havoc; John Russell; Dorothy Hart
- Cinematography: Irving Glassberg
- Edited by: Edward Curtiss
- Music by: Milton Schwarzwald
- Color process: Black and white
- Production company: Universal International Pictures
- Distributed by: Universal Pictures
- Release date: November 1949
- Running time: 82 minutes
- Country: United States
- Language: English

The Story of Molly X is a 1949 American film noir crime film directed by Crane Wilbur and starring June Havoc, John Russell and Dorothy Hart. The screenplay concerns a woman who tries to reform after being sent to prison, but faces obstacles.

== Plot ==
After her husband is killed, a woman executes a series of robberies with her husband's gang while searching for his murderer.

== Cast ==
- June Havoc as Molly X
- John Russell as Cash Brady
- Dorothy Hart as Anne
- Connie Gilchrist as Dawn
- Cathy Lewis as Jan
- Sara Berner as Amy
- Sandra Gould as Vera
- Katherine Warren as Norma Calvert (as Katharine Warren)
- Charles McGraw as Police Capt. Breen
- Elliott Lewis as Rod Markle
- Wally Maher as Chris Renbow

== Reception ==
Bosley Crowther, critic for The New York Times, was unimpressed, writing, "there is little of substance or excitement in 'The Story of Molly X.'" He found the story and actors unconvincing: "... this film ... carries a great deal more sentiment than conviction. Miss Havoc may look mighty sweet but she certainly does not overwhelm you with a sense of her cold recalcitrance ... And the females with whom she is surrounded in this penal institute seem not much more wicked or unsocial than the young ladies in a Connecticut finishing school."

== See also ==
- List of American films of 1949
