= John Russell (actor) =

American actor (1921–1991)

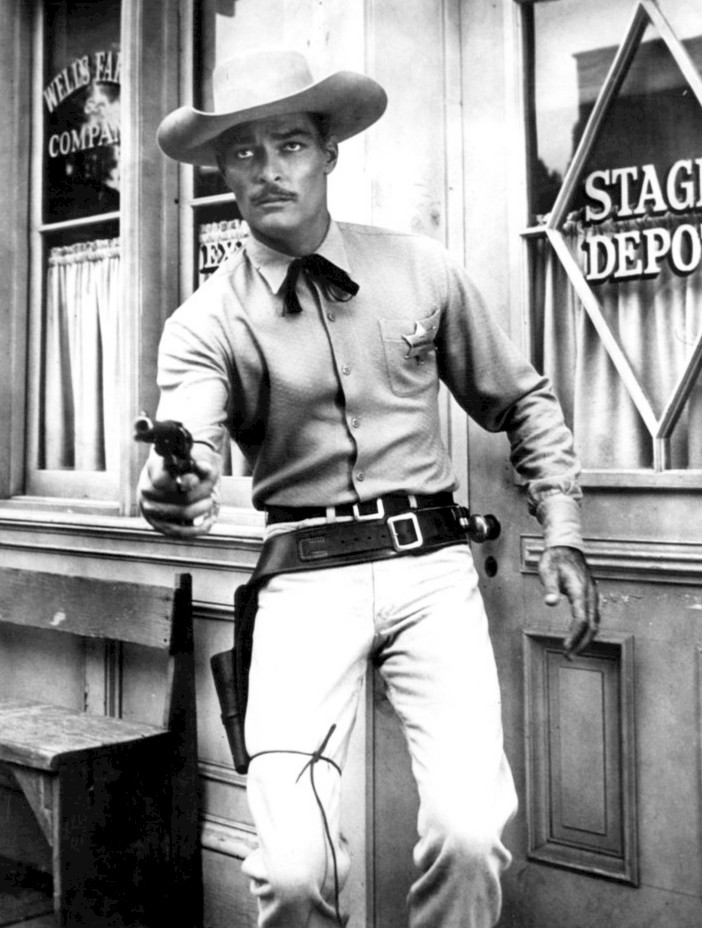
- Russell as Dan Troop in Lawman, 1959
- Born: John Lawrence Russell; January 3, 1921; Los Angeles, California, U.S.
- Died: January 19, 1991 (aged 70); Los Angeles, California, U.S.
- Resting place: Los Angeles National Cemetery
- Years active: 1939–1988
- Spouses: Renata Titus (m. 1943; div. 1965) Linda Anne Warner Pearse (m. 1970; div. 1971)

John Lawrence Russell (January 3, 1921 – January 19, 1991) was an American film and television actor, most noted for his starring role as Marshal Dan Troop in the ABC Western television series Lawman from 1958 to 1962 and his lead role as international adventurer Tim Kelly in the syndicated TV series Soldiers of Fortune from 1955 to 1957.

== Early life ==
Russell was born in Los Angeles to insurance company executive John Henry Russell and his wife, Amy Requa, the eldest of three children. He attended the University of California, Los Angeles as a student athlete.

Following the start of World War II, he joined the United States Marine Corps, though he was initially rejected because of his height (6 ft 3 in (1.91 m)). He was commissioned as a second lieutenant on November 11, 1942, and was assigned to the 6th Marine Regiment. His division was sent to Guadalcanal, where he served as an assistant intelligence officer. He contracted malaria and returned home with a medical discharge.

== Career ==
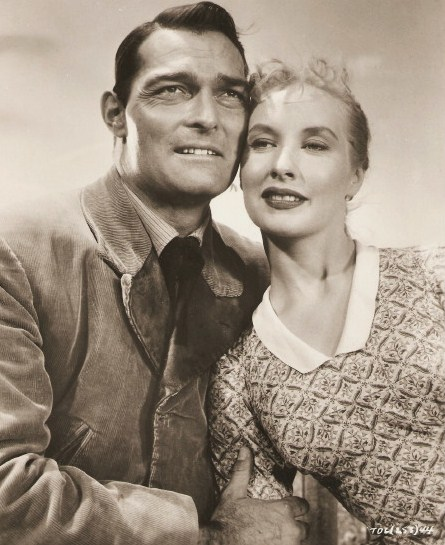
Russell and Penny Edwards in The Dalton Girls (1957)

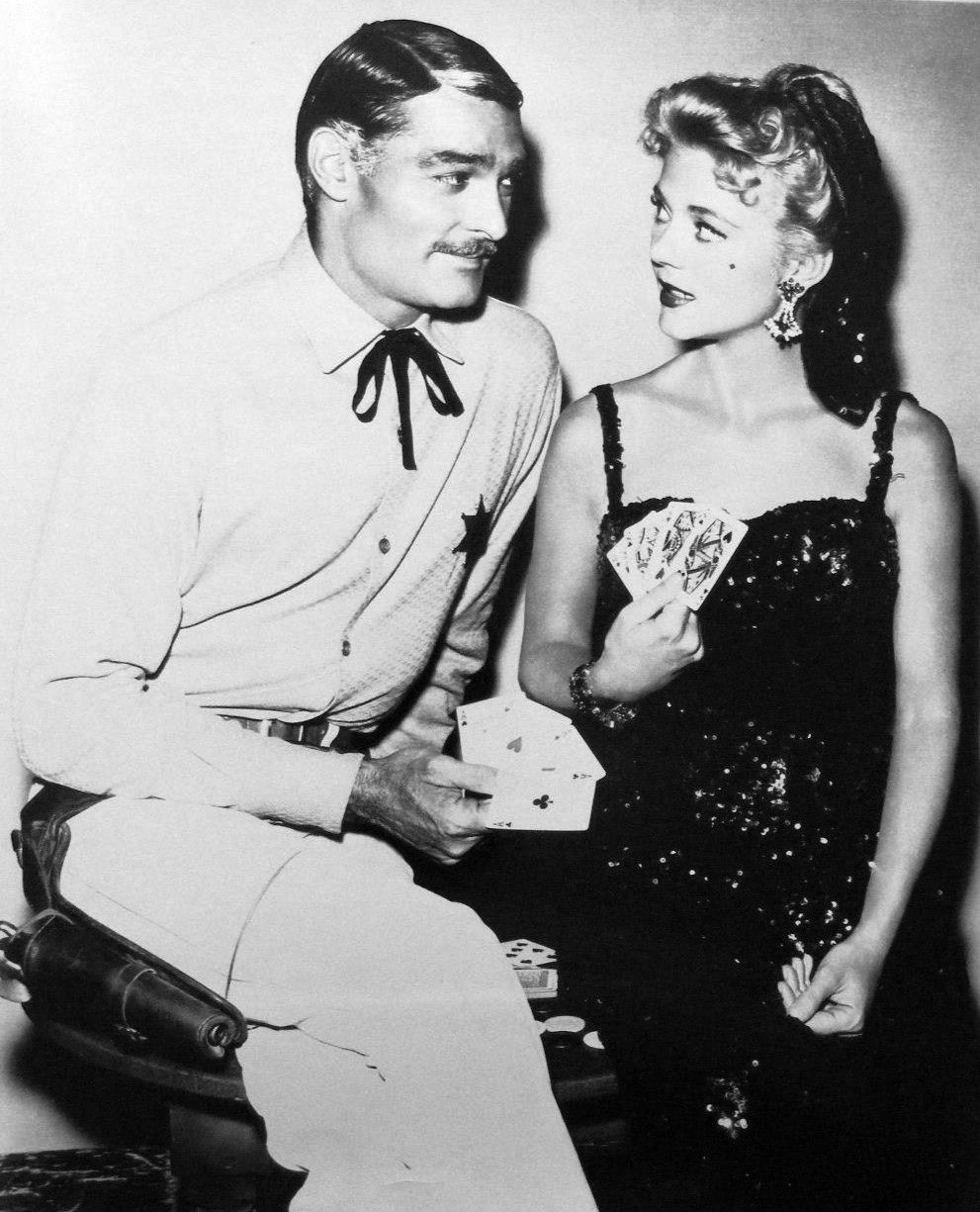
Russell and Peggie Castle in Lawman (1959)

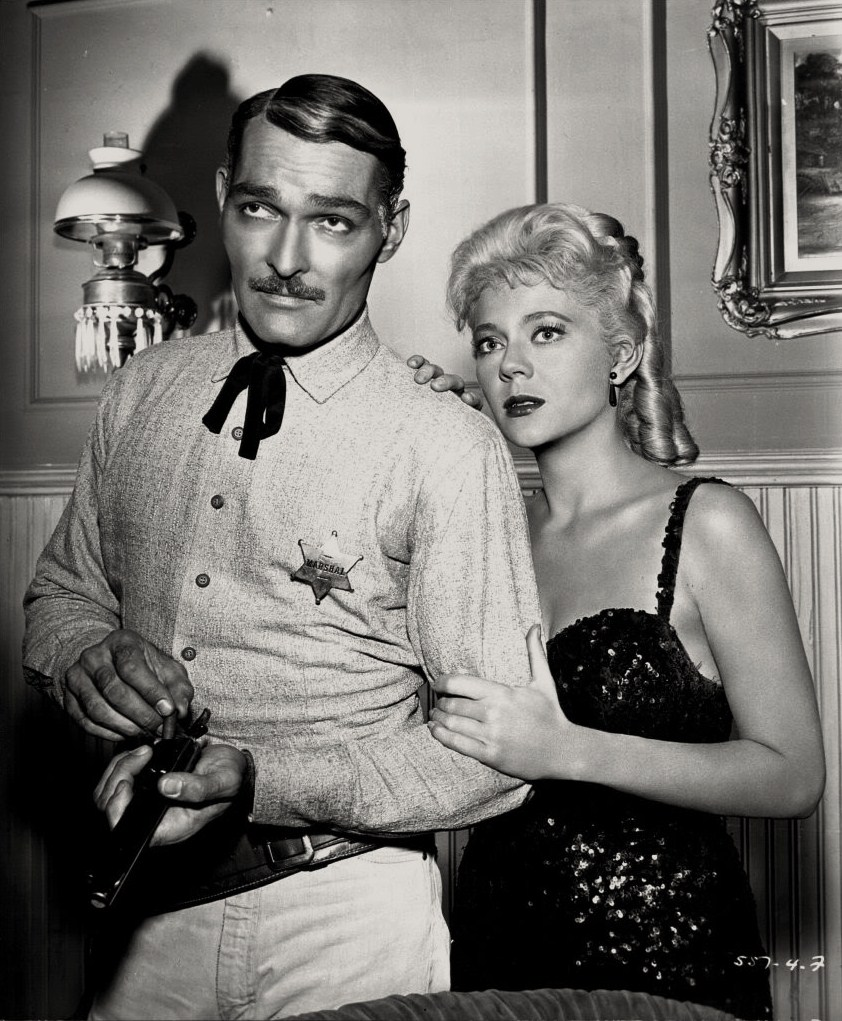
Russell and Castle in Lawman (1962)

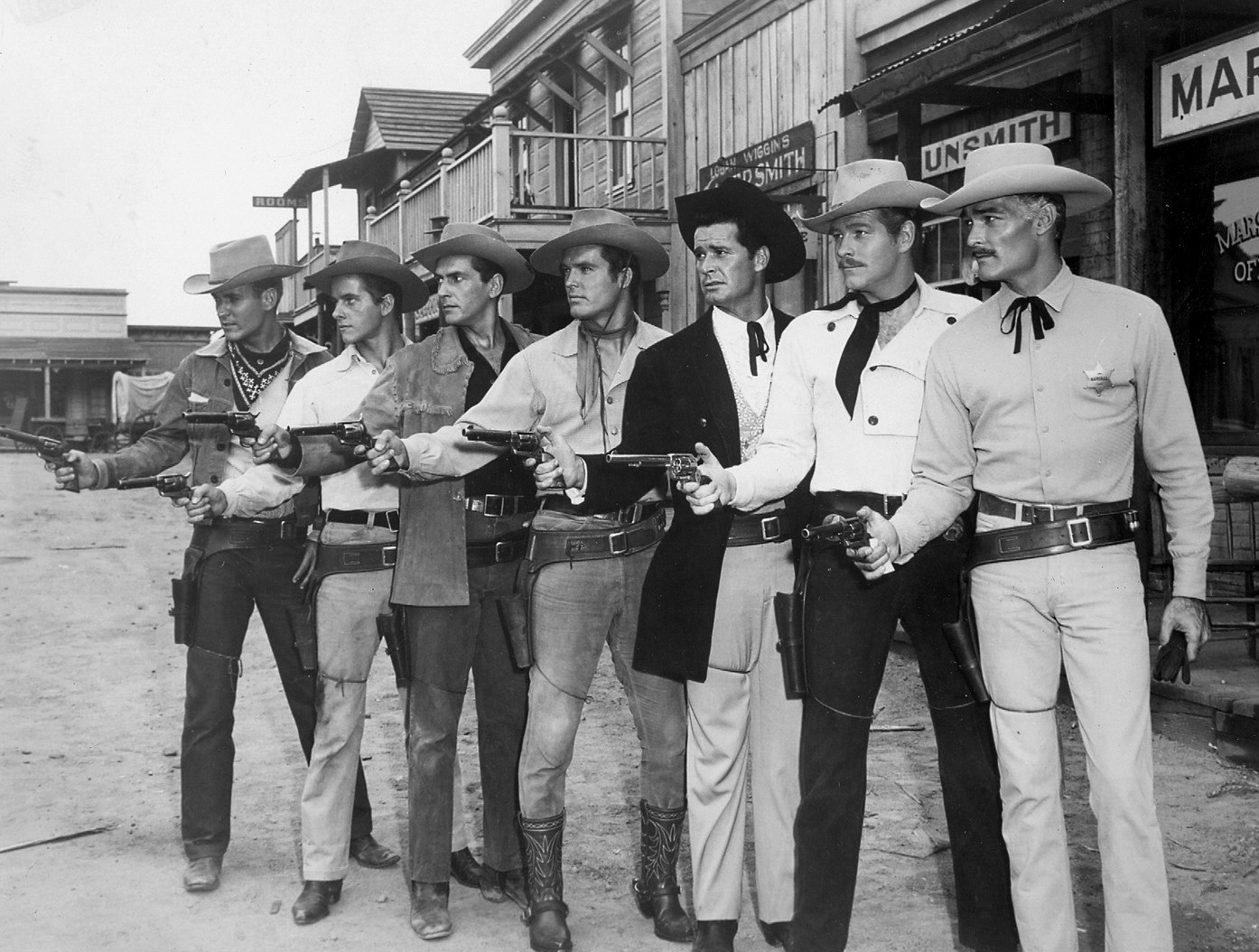
Publicity still with 1959 Warner Bros. series leads Will Hutchins (Sugarfoot), Peter Brown (Lawman), Jack Kelly (Maverick), Ty Hardin (Bronco), James Garner (Maverick), Wayde Preston (Colt .45), and John Russell (Lawman)

Russell signed a contract with 20th Century Fox in 1945 and made his first film appearance as a guard in A Royal Scandal. He played several supporting parts while at Fox, acting the role of a junior law partner in the Clifton Webb comedy Sitting Pretty (1948), as well as a navy pilot in Slattery's Hurricane (1949). He primarily played secondary roles, often in Western films, including William A. Wellman's 1948 Yellow Sky. Later, however, he signed with Republic Pictures, where he was cast in a starring role opposite Judy Canova in Oklahoma Annie (1952).

In 1955, Russell landed the lead role in a television drama series called Soldiers of Fortune. This half-hour syndicated adventure show placed his sidekick (played by Chick Chandler) and him in a dangerous setting each week. While the show proved popular with young boys, it did not draw enough adult viewers to its prime slot and was canceled in 1957. That same year, he returned to films briefly to appear as a corrupt agricultural magnate in the Warner Bros. low-budget exploitation film Untamed Youth. A year later, he returned to the small screen, as gunslinger Matt Reardon, in "The Empty Gun" episode of the ABC/Warner Bros. Western series, Cheyenne.

In 1958, he appeared as Saylor Hornbook on Cheyenne in the episode titled "Dead to Rights". In 1958, he was cast in his best-known role: the stolid, taciturn Marshal Dan Troop, the lead character in Lawman, an ABC/Warner Bros. hit Western series that ran for four years. Co-starring alongside Peter Brown, who played Deputy Johnny McKay, and Peggie Castle as Birdcage Saloon owner Lily Merrill, Russell portrayed a US frontier peace officer mentoring his younger compatriot. Russell also appeared in other motion pictures for Warner Bros., notably as a Sioux chieftain in Yellowstone Kelly (1959) and as a rich, corrupt cattle rancher, Nathan Burdette, in the highly successful Howard Hawks Western Rio Bravo (1959), starring John Wayne. At the same time, Russell guest-starred in an episode of NBC's adventure series Northwest Passage. In 1969, Russell appeared in five episodes of the Robert Wagner series, It Takes a Thief: "Guess Who's Coming To Rio?" (January 9, 1969), "Saturday Night in Venice" (September 25, 1969), "The Blue, Blue Danube" (October 30, 1969), "Payoff in The Piazza" (November 13, 1969), and "A Friend in Deed" (November 27, 1969).

Throughout the remainder of his movie career, he played secondary roles in more than 20 films, including several A.C. Lyles Westerns and three films directed by his friend, Clint Eastwood, most notably as Marshal Stockburn, the chief villain in Eastwood's 1985 film Pale Rider. Russell also appeared as Bloody Bill Anderson in Eastwood's 1976 Western The Outlaw Josey Wales. He appeared in the second season of the Filmation children's science-fiction series Jason of Star Command. He played Commander Stone, a blue-skinned alien from Alpha Centauri.

== Death ==
Russell died of complications from emphysema in 1991, aged 70.

== Filmography ==
- A Royal Scandal (1945) – Guard (uncredited)
- A Bell for Adano (1945) – Capt. Anderson (uncredited)
- Within These Walls (1945) – Rogers
- The Dark Corner (1946) – Policeman at Tony's Apartment (uncredited)
- Somewhere in the Night (1946) – Marine Captain (uncredited)
- Three Little Girls in Blue (1946) – Young Man at Party (uncredited)
- Forever Amber (1947) – Black Jack Mallard
- Sitting Pretty (1948) – Bill Philby
- Yellow Sky (1948) – Lengthy
- Slattery's Hurricane (1949) – Lt. 'Hobbie' Hobson
- The Gal Who Took the West (1949) – Grant O'Hara
- The Story of Molly X (1949) – Cash Brady
- Undertow (1949) – Danny Morgan
- Saddle Tramp (1950) – Rocky
- Frenchie (1950) – Lance Cole
- The Fat Man (1951) – Gene Gordon
- Fighting Coast Guard (1951) – Barney Walker
- The Barefoot Mailman (1951) – Theron
- Man in the Saddle (1951) – Hugh Clagg
- Oklahoma Annie (1952) – Dan Fraser
- Hoodlum Empire (1952) – Joe Gray
- The Sun Shines Bright (1953) – Ashby Corwin
- Fair Wind to Java (1953) – Flint
- Jubilee Trail (1954) – Oliver Hale
- Hell's Outpost (1954) – Ben Hodes
- The Last Command (1955) – Lt. Dickinson
- Untamed Youth (1957) – Russ Tropp
- Hell Bound (1957) – Jordan
- The Dalton Girls (1957) – W.T. 'Illinois' Grey
- Fort Massacre (1958) – Pvt. Robert W. Travis
- Rio Bravo (1959) – Nathan Burdette
- Yellowstone Kelly (1959) – Gall
- Apache Uprising (1965) – Vance Buckner
- Hostile Guns (1967) – Aaron Pleasant
- Fort Utah (1967) – Eli Jonas
- Buckskin (1968) – Patch
- Fireball Jungle (1968) – Nero Solitarius
- If He Hollers, Let Him Go! (1968) – Sheriff
- Noon Sunday (1970) – Darmody
- Cannon for Cordoba (1970) – John J. Pershing
- Blood Legacy (1971) – Frank Mantee
- Smoke in the Wind (1975) – Cagle Mondier
- Fugitive Lovers (1975) – Harris Alexander
- The Outlaw Josey Wales (1976) – Bloody Bill Anderson
- Mission to Glory: A True Story (1977) – Capt. Solis
- Uncle Scam (1981) – Art
- Honkytonk Man (1982) – Jack Wade
- Pale Rider (1985) – Marshal Stockburn
- Under the Gun (1988) – Simon Stone

== Selected television ==
Year	Title	Role	Notes
1958	Cheyenne (TV series)	Matt Reardon	Season 3/Episode 12 - "The Empty Gun"
1958	Cheyenne (TV series)	Saylor Hornbook	Season 3/Episode 18 - "Dead to Rights"
1958-1962	Lawman (TV series)	Marshal Dan Troop	156 Episodes
1973	Emergency (TV series)	Sam Jeffers	Season 3 Episode 13 - "Understanding"
1974	Gunsmoke (TV series)	Carl Ryker	Season 20 Episode 7 - "The Iron Men"
1974	McCloud (TV series)	Harry Hague	Season 5 Episode 5 - "The Concrete Jungle Caper"
1974	Police Story (TV series)	Lieutenant Galvin	Season 2 Episode 9 - "Love, Mabel"
1979	Jason of Star Command	Commander Stone (a.k.a. The Commander)	Season 2, all 12 Episodes
