= Fighter Squadron =

1948 American war film directed by Raoul Walsh

- Theatrical release poster
- Directed by: Raoul Walsh
- Written by: Seton I. Miller; Martin Rackin
- Produced by: Seton I. Miller
- Starring: Edmond O'Brien; Robert Stack; John Rodney
- Cinematography: Wilfred M. Cline; Sidney Hickox
- Edited by: Christian Nyby
- Music by: Max Steiner
- Production company: Warner Bros. Pictures
- Distributed by: Warner Bros. Pictures
- Release date: November 27, 1948 (U.S.)
- Running time: 96 minutes
- Country: United States
- Language: English
- Budget: $1,597,000
- Box office: $1.75 million or $3,086,000

Fighter Squadron is a 1948 American World War II aviation war film in Technicolor from Warner Bros. Pictures, produced by Seton I. Miller, directed by Raoul Walsh, that stars Edmond O'Brien, Robert Stack, and John Rodney.

== Plot ==
At an American air base in England in 1943, conniving, womanizing Sergeant Dolan (Tom D'Andrea) manipulates everyone, while insubordinate, maverick pilot fighter ace Major Ed Hardin (Edmond O'Brien) gives his commanding officer and close friend, Colonel Brickley (John Rodney), headaches by ignoring the out-of-date rules of engagement formulated by Brigadier General M. Gilbert (Shepperd Strudwick). When Major General Mike McCready (Henry Hull) promotes Brickley to whip a new squadron into shape, Brickley also recommends Hardin as his replacement.

Despite his misgivings, McCready agrees. To everyone's surprise, Hardin strictly enforces the rules. One rule in particular, forbidding pilots to marry, irks his friend and wingman Captain Stu Hamilton (Robert Stack). As a result, when his tour of duty ends, Hamilton does not sign up for another, and instead goes home to marry his sweetheart. He later returns a married man, however, hoping to persuade Hardin to overlook his transgression.

Hardin refuses to let him back into the squadron, but does weaken enough to let him fly one last mission. Unfortunately, Hamilton is shot down and killed; he admits to Hardin over the radio as his burning aircraft plummets to Earth that he had been distracted during the mission by thoughts of his wife.

McCready decides that he needs Hardin for his staff, but allows him to first finish his current combat tour. Hardin's next mission is providing close air support for the Allied landings on D-Day. His aircraft is hit by flak and goes down in a slow spiral. Hardin's final fate, though, is never revealed, as his squadron continues to support the D-Day invasion.

== Cast ==
- Edmond O'Brien as Major Ed Hardin
- Robert Stack as Captain Stu Hamilton
- John Rodney as Colonel Bill Brickley
- Tom D'Andrea as Sergeant Dolan
- Henry Hull as Major General Mike McCready
- James Holden as Lieutenant Tennessee Atkins
- Walter Reed as Captain Duke Chappell
- Shepperd Strudwick as Brigadier General M. Gilbert
- Arthur Space as Major Sanford
- Jack Larson as 2nd Lieutenant "Shorty" Kirk
- Bill McLean as Private Wilbur
- Lilian Bond as English lady
- Mickey McCardle as Jacobs
- Claude Allen as Stunt Pilot

Cast notes:

- Rock Hudson has an uncredited role as a pilot in his film debut. Hudson, a former truck driver by the name of Roy Fitzgerald, was under personal contract to director Raoul Walsh, who rode him unmercifully, saying "You big dumb bastard, don’t just get in the center of the camera and stay there like a tree, move!" It took 38 takes to get a good version of Hudson's first line, "You’ve got to get a bigger blackboard." He had another line after the raid on Berlin, as they celebrate in the bar with their lucky mascot black cat, "You're sure it's the same one?".

== Production ==
In Fighter Squadron, the fighter group is equipped with 16 Republic P-47 Thunderbolts provided from the Air National Guard units in Georgia, North Carolina and Tennessee, which were still equipped with the type. To portray Luftwaffe fighters, the film used eight North American P-51 Mustangs from the California ANG, with ersatz German markings. The film was shot for two weeks at Oscoda Army Air Field on Lake Huron, Michigan, a location that approximated the terrain of the fictional English air base where the fighter groups were located. The ANG units that were assigned to the film also were able to take their active duty training while flying with the film company

Fighter Squadron used previously unreleased aerial combat color footage shot by William Wyler for his documentary, Thunderbolt! (1947). Additional location shooting took place at Van Nuys Airport, California. (Note: While on location, a fatality occurred when a P-47 began to break up in mid-air; the pilot, Lt. Louis Mikell baled out successfully but drowned in Lake Huron.)

Fighter Squadron, while fictitious, is based on the exploits of the fighter groups based in England before the D-Day Normandy landings. Screenwriter Seton Miller based the film on the actions of the 4th and 56th Fighter Groups. In the 4th Fighter Group, the men called themselves "Blakeslee's Bachelors"; when one got married, it was followed by ordered transfers to other units. The transfer policy was decided by the unit's commanding officer, Col. Donald J. M. Blakeslee. The technical advisors for the film included Major Joseph Perry, a veteran of the 56th Fighter Group and Major Leroy Gover, an ace with the 4th Fighter Group.

=== Film music ===
Warner Brothers recycled Max Steiner's main theme music from their Errol Flynn naval aviation film Dive Bomber (1941) as the main theme for Fighter Squadron. This rousing march was used again, three years later, as the main theme music for Warner Bros. World War II submarine drama Operation Pacific (1951). It would appear yet again, in the 1959 submarine film Up Periscope.

== Reception ==
Fighter Squadron was reviewed by Bosley Crowther in The New York Times. He disparaged the "lurid adventure episodes" in the film story, and commented: "The glamour-repute of the Air Forces and the 'hot rocks' who flew the fighter planes, which was cause for much ironic jesting among the lowly 'doughfeet' during the war, is the stuff that Warner Brothers has exclusively put upon the screen in its loud, Technicolored Fighter Squadron, which came to the Strand yesterday".

=== Box office ===
According to Warner Bros. financial records, the film earned $2,252,000 domestically and $834,000 foreign.
