= I Was a Shoplifter =

1950 film by Charles Lamont

- Film poster
- Directed by: Charles Lamont
- Written by: Irwin Gielgud
- Produced by: Leonard Goldstein
- Starring: Scott Brady; Mona Freeman
- Cinematography: Irving Glassberg
- Edited by: Otto Ludwig
- Production company: Universal Pictures
- Distributed by: Universal Pictures
- Release dates: April 27, 1950 (New York); April 29, 1950 (Los Angeles)
- Running time: 74 minutes
- Country: United States
- Language: English

I Was a Shoplifter is a 1950 American film noir crime film directed by Charles Lamont and starring Scott Brady and Mona Freeman.

== Plot ==
Shoplifter Faye Burton is being watched by security guard Herb Klaxon at a Los Angeles department store. Shopper Jeff Andrews tries to warn her, but Faye is caught and arrested. She signs a confession and is set free, warned that future incidents will lead to jail time. Jeff is arrested as well, but he is actually an undercover law officer working to bust the shoplifting ring.

Faye returns to her job as a librarian, but the gang of thieves run by pawnbroker Ina Perdue recruits her by claiming that they can steal the record of her confession, thereby clearing her record. Ina and her henchman Pepe show Faye how to steal in the manner of a professional thief, and she is then assigned to commit a robbery in San Diego as a test. Faye is followed and protected by Jeff. He tells her that he is out of jail on bail.

Pepe attempts to sexually assault Faye, who becomes so despondent that she attempts suicide. Jeff rescues her and reveals his true identity. They arrange to work together, but Jeff's cover is blown and Faye is kidnapped. Ina and Pepe take her to Mexico to continue their crime spree, but Jeff and his men arrive in time to apprehend the crooks. Jeff also realizes that he has fallen in love with Faye.

== Cast ==
- Scott Brady as Jeff Andrews
- Mona Freeman as Faye Burton
- Andrea King as Ina Perdue
- Tony Curtis as Pepe (as Anthony Curtis)
- Charles Drake as Herb Klaxon
- Gregg Martell as The Champ
- Larry Keating as Harry Dunson
- Robert Gist as Barkie Neff
- Michael Raffetto as Sheriff Bascom

== Reception ==
In a contemporary review for The New York Times, critic A. H. Weiler wrote that other than the film's introductory statistics on shoplifting, "this obvious little number ... is indistinguishable from the many distressingly unoriginal melodramas arriving here from the Coast."

The Los Angeles Times reviewer wrote: "Probably not all roundups of shoplifters are accomplished with the melodramatic hullabaloo to be found in 'I Was a Shoplifter,' though it is likely that there is really enough human drama of a quieter sort to fill a book. Universal-International has cannily cashed in on the racket's possibilities to make a highly exciting and absorbing story. The film is documentary and factual enough to carry heavy conviction."
