= Outside the Wall (film) =

1950 film by Crane Wilbur

- Theatrical release poster
- Directed by: Crane Wilbur
- Screenplay by: Crane Wilbur
- Story by: Henry Edward Helseth
- Produced by: Aaron Rosenberg
- Starring: Richard Basehart; Marilyn Maxwell; Signe Hasso; Dorothy Hart
- Cinematography: Irving Glassberg
- Edited by: Edward Curtiss
- Color process: Black and white
- Production company: Universal Pictures
- Distributed by: Universal Pictures
- Release date: February 17, 1950 (Philadelphia)
- Running time: 80 minutes
- Country: United States
- Language: English

Outside the Wall is a 1950 American film noir crime film directed by Crane Wilbur and starring Richard Basehart, Marilyn Maxwell, Signe Hasso and Dorothy Hart.

Some location shooting took place at the Eastern State Penitentiary in Philadelphia and on the city's streets.

== Plot ==
Larry Nelson, pardoned after serving nearly half of his 30-year sentence for manslaughter, leaves Eastern State Penitentiary but faces difficulty settling into the outside world. Determined to avoid any further trouble with the law, he takes a job as a lab assistant in a country sanitarium, where he falls for attractive nurse Charlotte. Larry recognizes one of the patients in the sanitarium as Jack Bernard, another ex-convict who has just executed a million-dollar heist. Bernard offers Larry money if he will deliver some of the heist money to his ex-wife. When Larry attempts to give her the money, she mobilizes her gang to seize the rest of the loot. Sweet, wholesome nurse Ann helps Larry escape the dangerous situation.

== Cast ==
- Richard Basehart as Larry Nelson
- Marilyn Maxwell as Charlotte Maynard
- Signe Hasso as Celia Bentner
- Dorothy Hart as Ann Taylor
- Joseph Pevney as Gus Wormser
- Lloyd Gough as Red Chaney
- Harry Morgan as Garth (credited as Henry Morgan)
- John Hoyt as Jack Bernard
- Mickey Knox as Latzo
- Joseph Sweeney as Prison Hospital Inmate
- Tudor Owen as Watchman

== Release ==
The film's world premiere was held in Philadelphia, where much of the film was shot, at the Aldine Theatre on February 17, 1950.

== Reception ==
In a contemporary review for The New York Times, Bosley Crowther wrote:

Even though someone informs us at the beginning of "Outside the Wall" that this crime melodrama ... is one of the strangest stories ever told, we wish to observe it unlikely that this opinion will be popularly held. As a matter of fact, the average patron will probably find it completely commonplace—it being no more than the story of an ex-convict who tries to go straight but gets into trouble with some hoodlums when he attempts to raise money for a greedy dame. And that consequential dilemma, we submit, is not very rare. Likewise, the narrative structure and performance of this tale are not of an order to rate them as rare or remarkable. The pattern is strictly conventional, it being a straightaway account of one man's depressing misadventures with society, women and thugs."

Critic Mildred Martin of The Philadelphia Inquirer called the film "a distinctly phony affair" and wrote that the story "gets completely out of hand".

== See also ==
- List of American films of 1950
