= All at Sea (1933 film) =

1933 film

- Directed by: E.H. Kleinert
- Written by: Ballard MacDonald
- Production company: Mentone Productions
- Distributed by: Universal Pictures
- Release date: September 20, 1933 (U.S.)
- Running time: 20 min
- Country: United States

All at Sea is a 1933 American black and white film directed by E.H. Kleinert and written by Ballard MacDonald.

== Cast ==
- Vincent Lopez as Himself – Orchestra Leader
- Joe Laurie Jr. as Himself – Writer
- Hugh O'Connell as Himself – Comedian
- Ethel Barrymore Colt as Herself – Daughter of Ethel Barrymore
- William O'Neill as Himself
- Pat Rooney as Himself – Comedian
- Ann Lester as Herself
- Hal Forde as Himself
- Phil Regan as Himself – Vocalist
- Gregory Stone as Himself – Composer
- Minor & Root as Themselves – Dancers
- Three X Sisters as Themselves – Vocal Trio
