= Phil Regan (actor) =

American actor and singer (1906–1996)

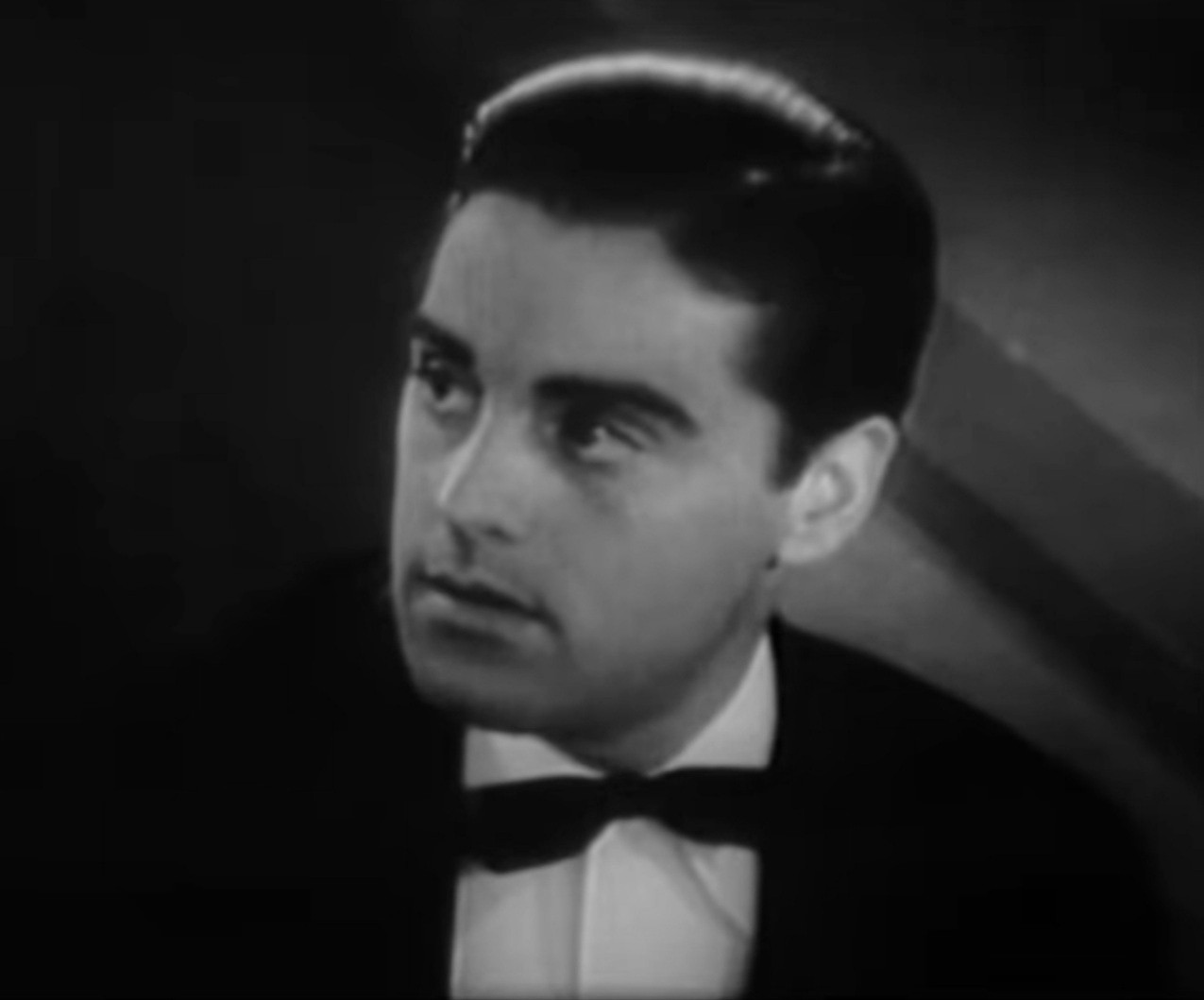
- Regan in Manhattan Merry-Go-Round (1937)
- Born: Philip Joseph Christopher Aloysius Regan; May 28, 1906; Brooklyn, New York, U.S.
- Died: February 11, 1996 (aged 89); Santa Barbara, California, U.S.
- Resting place: Santa Barbara's Calvary Cemetery
- Occupations: Actor; singer
- Years active: 1933–1951
- Spouse: Josephine Dwyer (m. 1924; died 1994)
- Children: 4

Philip Joseph Christopher Aloysius Regan (May 28, 1906 – February 11, 1996) was an American actor and singer who later served time for bribery in a real estate scandal.

== Early years ==
Born in Brooklyn on May 28, 1906, Regan was the oldest of five children of an Irish immigrant couple who lived in Brooklyn, New York. When he was 13 years old, Regan "had to quit school and drive a team of horses in Brooklyn." Before venturing into a career in entertainment, he went on to work as a boatman, a court clerk, a clerk for an oil company, and a policeman.

== Career ==
Regan worked as a detective on the New York Police Department before his singing was overheard by a radio producer at a party. He was signed by CBS radio "as a result of his singing -- gratis -- at a charity benefit." He became known as "The Romantic Singer of Romantic Songs" when he performed with Guy Lombardo and his orchestra on the Burns and Allen radio program. This earned him the nickname "The Singing Cop". Regan headlined musical comedies at both Republic and Monogram studios.

William Gilmore, in a review of the film Laughing Irish Eyes in the Brooklyn Eagle, described Regan as having "astonishing good looks and an extraordinarily pleasing tenor voice." He performed the National Anthem at the 1949 inauguration of President Harry S Truman.

In 1951, he was the host of "The Phil Regan Armed Forces Show" on the radio. He left show business in the early 1950s for a new career in public relations, drawing on his contacts.

== Bribery conviction ==
In 1972, Regan became involved with a developer named Halimi who had created successful developments at Lake Tahoe and elsewhere. Halimi had purchased the option to develop a large coastal property on More Mesa in Santa Barbara, California, which required a permit from Santa Barbara County. He was aware that three of the five supervisors were in favor, but he wanted to find a fourth vote for Halimi to avoid an appeal. He approached Frank Frost in December 1972. Frost had just been elected to the board of supervisors and would take office in January. Frost perceived that an attempt at bribery was being arranged and reported his suspicions to the county district attorney and sheriff. A sting operation was planned and Regan passed $1,000 to Frost's friend who posed as a go-between.

Testimony at Regan's trial established that he had promised an additional $5,000 for Frost's vote. Regan was arrested, convicted and sentenced to two years in prison. He was released after one year. Upon his release, Regan returned to Santa Barbara.

== Personal life ==
Regan and his wife, Josephine Dwyer Regan, had four children.

Regan died on February 11, 1996 at the age of 89. He is interred in Calvary Cemetery in Santa Barbara.

== Partial filmography ==
- All at Sea (1933)
- Student Tour (1934)
- Sweet Adeline (1934)
- We're in the Money (1935)
- Laughing Irish Eyes (1936)
- Happy Go Lucky (1936)
- The Hit Parade (1937)
- Manhattan Merry-Go-Round (1937)
- Outside of Paradise (1938)
- She Married a Cop (1939)
- Flight at Midnight (1939)
- Las Vegas Nights (1941)
- Sweet Rosie O'Grady (1943)
- Sunbonnet Sue (1945)
- Swing Parade of 1946 (1946)
- Three Little Words (1950)
