= Hell's Outpost =

1954 film by Joseph Kane

- Theatrical release poster
- Directed by: Joseph Kane (as Joe Kane)
- Screenplay by: Kenneth Gamet
- Based on: Silver Rock by Luke Short
- Produced by: Joseph Kane (as Joe Kane)
- Starring: Rod Cameron; Joan Leslie; Chill Wills; John Russell
- Cinematography: Jack A. Marta
- Edited by: Richard L. Van Enger
- Music by: R. Dale Butts
- Color process: Black and white
- Production company: Republic Pictures
- Distributed by: Republic Pictures
- Release date: December 15, 1954
- Running time: 90 minutes
- Country: United States
- Language: English

Hell's Outpost is a 1954 American Western film directed by Joseph Kane and starring Rod Cameron, Joan Leslie, Chill Wills, John Russell.

== Plot ==
Tully Gibbs arrives in a California mining town looking for Kevin Russel, whose late son Al he had known in Korea during the war. Tully brings letters dictated by Al, who had lost the use of his hands. Kevin is grateful, saying Al had mentioned his friend Tully in previous correspondence.

Wealthy local bully Ben Hodes (who Tully had seen driving wildly when drunk) takes a dislike to Tully, particularly his attentions to Sarah Moffit, a woman Ben wants to have for himself. Despite Tully laying a hit on him when drunk earlier, Ben challenges Tully to a fight; Tully says he will oblige, provided Ben lends him $10,000 if he wins. Tully then knocks him cold.

Ben keeps his end of the bargain, but after Tully uses the money to begin a rival mining enterprise, Ben sabotages a bulldozer, organizes a roadblock and impedes Tully wherever he attempts to go. Sarah confides in Sam Horne, the newspaper publisher, that she doubts the authenticity of Tully's story about Al's letters.

An attempt by Ben to blow up Tully's mine with dynamite backfires, leaving Ben dead. Tully discovers that Kevin has known all along that he wrote the letters from Korea himself, pretending the sentiments were Al's. He is forgiven, by Sarah as well.

== Cast ==
- Rod Cameron as Tully Gibbs
- Joan Leslie as Sarah Moffit
- Chill Wills as Kevin Russel
- John Russell as Ben Hodes
- Jim Davis as Sam Horne
- Ben Cooper as Alec Bacchione
- Kristine Miller as Beth Hodes
- Taylor Holmes as Timothy Byers
- Barton MacLane as Sheriff Olson
- Ruth Lee as Mrs. Moffit
- Arthur Q. Bryan as Harry
- Oliver Blake as Hotel Clerk
