= List of American films of 1953 =

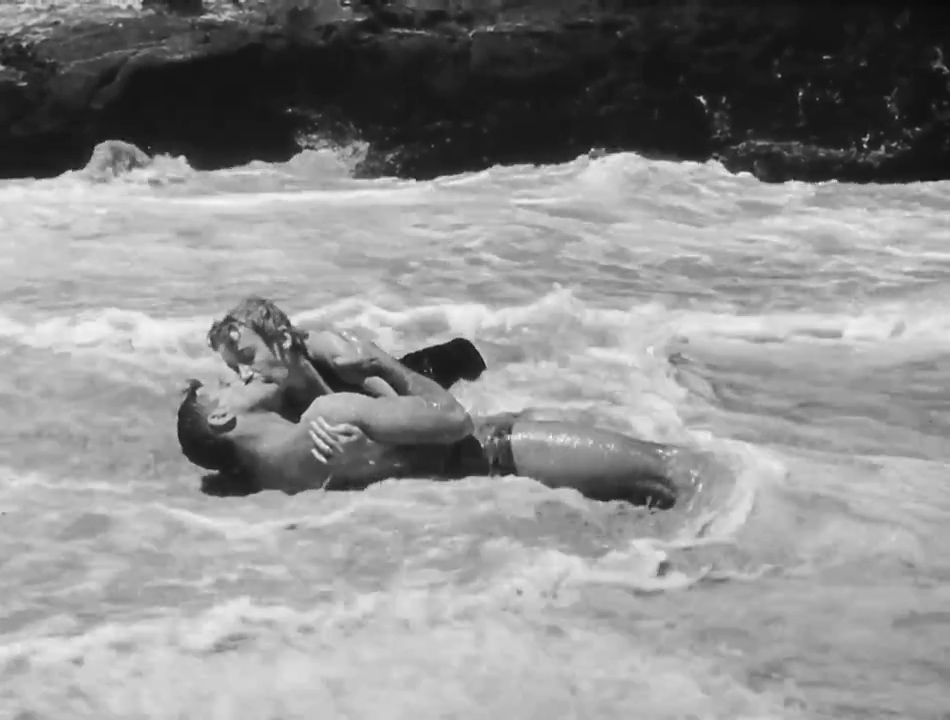
Burt Lancaster and Deborah Kerr in From Here to Eternity

More than 344 American feature films were released in 1953.

Donald O'Connor and Fredric March cohosted the 26th Academy Awards ceremony on March 25, 1954, held at the RKO Pantages Theatre in Hollywood. This was the second year in which the ceremony was telecast, with viewership at an estimated 43,000,000.

The winner in the Best Motion Picture category was Columbia's From Here to Eternity. All of the major-category winners were black-and-white films.

The 11th Golden Globe Awards also honored the best films of 1953. There was no award for Best Picture in either the Musical or Comedy categories.

Spencer Tracy won the Golden Globe for Best Actor in a drama film for The Actress, while David Niven won Best Actor in the Musical or Comedy genre for The Moon Is Blue. Audrey Hepburn won Best Actress for Roman Holiday, and Ethel Merman won for Best Actress in a Musical or Comedy film for her role in Call Me Madam. The Robe won the Golden Globe for Best Motion Picture.

== A-B ==
Title	Director	Cast	Genre	Notes
The 49th Man	Fred F. Sears	Richard Denning, John Ireland, Suzanne Dalbert	Film noir	Columbia
99 River Street	Phil Karlson	John Payne, Evelyn Keyes	Film noir	United Artists
The 5,000 Fingers of Dr. T.	Roy Rowland	Tommy Rettig, Mary Healy	Musical fantasy	Columbia
Abbott and Costello Go to Mars	Charles Lamont	Abbott and Costello, Horace McMahon, Martha Hyer, Mari Blanchard	Comedy	Universal
Abbott and Costello Meet Dr. Jekyll and Mr. Hyde	Charles Lamont	Abbott and Costello, Boris Karloff	Comedy	Universal
Act of Love	Anatole Litvak	Kirk Douglas, Dany Robin	Drama	United Artists. Co-production with France
The Actress	George Cukor	Jean Simmons, Spencer Tracy, Teresa Wright	Drama	MGM; based on Ruth Gordon
The Affairs of Dobie Gillis	Don Weis	Debbie Reynolds, Bob Fosse	Musical comedy	MGM; became TV series
Affair with a Stranger	Roy Rowland	Jean Simmons, Victor Mature, Monica Lewis	Drama	RKO
The All American	Jesse Hibbs	Tony Curtis, Lori Nelson, Mamie Van Doren	Sports drama	Universal
All Ashore	Richard Quine	Mickey Rooney, Dick Haymes, Peggy Ryan, Ray McDonald	Comedy, Musical	Columbia
All I Desire	Douglas Sirk	Barbara Stanwyck, Richard Carlson, Lyle Bettger, Lori Nelson	Drama	Universal
All the Brothers Were Valiant	Richard Thorpe	Robert Taylor, Stewart Granger, Ann Blyth	Adventure	MGM; remake of 1923 film
Ambush at Tomahawk Gap	Fred F. Sears	John Hodiak, John Derek	Western	Columbia
Angel Face	Otto Preminger	Robert Mitchum, Jean Simmons, Mona Freeman	Film noir	RKO
Appointment in Honduras	Jacques Tourneur	Glenn Ford, Ann Sheridan, Zachary Scott	Adventure	RKO
Arena	Richard Fleischer	Gig Young, Jean Hagen, Polly Bergen	Drama	MGM
Arrowhead	Charles Warren	Charlton Heston, Jack Palance, Katy Jurado	Adventure	Paramount
Back to God's Country	Joseph Pevney	Rock Hudson, Marcia Henderson, Steve Cochran	Adventure, Western	Universal
Bad for Each Other	Irving Rapper	Charlton Heston, Lizabeth Scott	Film noir	Columbia
The Bandits of Corsica	Ray Nazarro	Paula Raymond, Richard Greene, Raymond Burr	Adventure	United Artists
Bandits of the West	Harry Keller	Allan Lane, Cathy Downs	Western	Republic
The Band Wagon	Vincente Minnelli	Fred Astaire, Cyd Charisse, Oscar Levant, Jack Buchanan, Nanette Fabray	Musical	MGM; 5 Oscar nominations
Battle Circus	John Huston	Humphrey Bogart, June Allyson, Robert Keith, Keenan Wynn	Drama	MGM
The Beast from 20,000 Fathoms	Eugène Lourié	Paula Raymond, Cecil Kellaway	Science fiction	Warner Bros.
Beat the Devil	John Huston	Humphrey Bogart, Jennifer Jones, Gina Lollobrigida, Peter Lorre	Comedy	United Artists
Beneath the 12-Mile Reef	Robert D. Webb	Robert Wagner, Terry Moore, Gilbert Roland	Adventure	20th Century Fox
The Bigamist	Ida Lupino	Joan Fontaine, Ida Lupino, Edmond O'Brien	Drama	Independent
The Big Heat	Fritz Lang	Glenn Ford, Gloria Grahame Jocelyn Brando	Film noir	Columbia
Big Leaguer	Robert Aldrich	Edward G. Robinson, Vera-Ellen	Comedy	MGM
Blowing Wild	Hugo Fregonese	Gary Cooper, Barbara Stanwyck, Ruth Roman	Drama	Warner Bros.
The Blue Gardenia	Fritz Lang	Anne Baxter, Richard Conte, Ann Sothern, Raymond Burr	Film noir	Warner Bros.
A Blueprint for Murder	Andrew L. Stone	Joseph Cotten, Jean Peters, Gary Merrill	Thriller	20th Century Fox
Born to the Saddle	William Beaudine	Chuck Courtney, Donald Woods	Western	Astor Pictures
Botany Bay	John Farrow	Alan Ladd, James Mason, Patricia Medina	Adventure	Paramount
Bright Road	Gerald Mayer	Dorothy Dandridge, Harry Belafonte	Drama	MGM
By the Light of the Silvery Moon	David Butler	Doris Day, Gordon MacRae	Musical	Warner Bros.; On Moonlight Bay sequel

== C ==
Title	Director	Cast	Genre	Notes
The Caddy	Norman Taurog	Dean Martin, Jerry Lewis, Donna Reed	Comedy	Paramount; debut of song "That's Amore"
Calamity Jane	David Butler	Doris Day, Howard Keel	Musical	Warner Bros.; Oscar for Best Song
Call Me Madam	Walter Lang	Ethel Merman, Donald O'Connor, Vera-Ellen, Billy De Wolfe	Musical	20th Century Fox. Based on play; Golden Globe for Merman
Captain John Smith and Pocahontas	Lew Landers	Anthony Dexter, Jody Lawrance	Historical	United Artists
Captain Scarlett	Thomas Carr	Richard Greene, Leonora Amar	Adventure	United Artists
Cat-Women of the Moon	Arthur Hilton	Sonny Tufts, Victor Jory	Science Fiction	Astor
Cease Fire!	Owen Crump		War	Paramount
Champ for a Day	William A. Seiter	Alex Nicol, Audrey Totter, Charles Winninger	Crime drama	Republic
Charade	Roy Kellino	James Mason, Pamela Mason	Drama	Independent
The Charge at Feather River	Gordon Douglas	Guy Madison, Vera Miles	Western	Warner Bros.
China Venture	Don Siegel	Edmond O'Brien, Barry Sullivan, Jocelyn Brando	War	Columbia
City Beneath the Sea	Budd Boetticher	Robert Ryan, Mala Powers, Anthony Quinn, Suzan Ball	Adventure	Universal
City of Bad Men	Harmon Jones	Dale Robertson, Jeanne Crain, Richard Boone	Western	20th Century Fox
City That Never Sleeps	John H. Auer	Gig Young, William Talman, Mala Powers, Paula Raymond, Chill Wills	Film noir	Republic
Clipped Wings	Edward Bernds	Leo Gorcey, Huntz Hall, June Vincent	Comedy	Allied Artists
The Clown	Robert Z. Leonard	Red Skelton, Jane Greer, Tim Considine	Drama	MGM
Code Two	Fred M. Wilcox	Ralph Meeker, Sally Forrest	Film noir	MGM
Column South	Frederick de Cordova	Audie Murphy, Joan Evans	Western	Universal
Combat Squad	Cy Roth	John Ireland, Lon McCallister	War	Columbia
Confidentially Connie	Edward Buzzell	Van Johnson, Janet Leigh, Louis Calhern	Comedy	MGM
Conquest of Cochise	William Castle	Robert Stack, John Hodiak, Joy Page	Western	Columbia
Count the Hours	Don Siegel	Teresa Wright, Macdonald Carey	Crime	RKO
Cow Country	Lesley Selander	Edmond O'Brien, Helen Westcott	Western	Allied Artists
Crazylegs	Francis D. Lyon	Lloyd Nolan, Joan Vohs	Sports	Republic
Cruisin' Down the River	Richard Quine	Dick Haymes, Audrey Totter	Musical	Columbia
Cry of the Hunted	Joseph H. Lewis	Vittorio Gassman, Barry Sullivan, Polly Bergen	Film noir	MGM

== D-G ==
Title	Director	Cast	Genre	Notes
Dance Hall Racket	Phil Tucker	Timothy Farrell, Lenny Bruce, Honey Harlow	Drama	Film Classics
Dangerous Crossing	Joseph M. Newman	Jeanne Crain, Michael Rennie, Carl Betz	Mystery	20th Century Fox; based on the play Cabin B-13
Dangerous When Wet	Charles Walters	Esther Williams, Fernando Lamas, Jack Carson	Musical	MGM
Decameron Nights	Hugo Fregonese	Joan Fontaine, Louis Jourdan, Joan Collins	Romance	RKO
Desert Legion	Joseph Pevney	Alan Ladd, Arlene Dahl, Richard Conte	Adventure	Universal
The Desert Rats	Robert Wise	Richard Burton, James Mason, Robert Newton	War	20th Century Fox
The Desert Song	H. Bruce Humberstone	Kathryn Grayson, Gordon MacRae, Raymond Massey	Musical	Warner Bros.; based on the operetta
Destination Gobi	Robert Wise	Richard Widmark, Don Taylor	War drama	20th Century Fox
Devil's Canyon	Alfred L. Werker	Virginia Mayo, Dale Robertson	Western	RKO
The Diamond Queen	John Brahm	Arlene Dahl, Fernando Lamas	Adventure	Warner Bros.
Down Laredo Way	William Witney	Rex Allen, Dona Drake	Western	Republic
Donovan's Brain	Felix E. Feist	Lew Ayres, Nancy Davis	Horror	United Artists
Down Among the Sheltering Palms	Edmund Goulding	Mitzi Gaynor, William Lundigan, David Wayne	Musical	20th Century Fox
Dream Wife	Sidney Sheldon	Cary Grant, Deborah Kerr, Walter Pidgeon	Comedy	MGM
East of Sumatra	Budd Boetticher	Jeff Chandler, Anthony Quinn, Marilyn Maxwell	Adventure	Universal
Easy to Love	Charles Walters	Esther Williams, Van Johnson, Tony Martin	Musical	MGM
The Eddie Cantor Story	Alfred E. Green	Keefe Brasselle, Marilyn Erskine, Aline MacMahon	Biography	Warner Bros.
El Alamein	Fred F. Sears	Scott Brady, Edward Ashley, Rita Moreno	War	Columbia
El Paso Stampede	Harry Keller	Allan Lane, Phyllis Coates	Western	Republic
Escape from Fort Bravo	John Sturges	William Holden, Eleanor Parker, John Forsythe	Western	MGM
Fair Wind to Java	Joseph Kane	Fred MacMurray, Vera Ralston, Victor McLaglen	Adventure	Republic Pictures
Fangs of the Arctic	Rex Bailey	Kirby Grant, Warren Douglas	Western	Allied Artists
The Farmer Takes a Wife	Henry Levin	Betty Grable, Dale Robertson	Musical comedy	20th Century Fox; remake of 1934 play, 1935 film
Fast Company	John Sturges	Howard Keel, Polly Bergen	Comedy	MGM
Fear and Desire	Stanley Kubrick	Frank Silvera, Paul Mazursky	Drama	Independent; Kubrick's first film
Fighter Attack	Lesley Selander	Sterling Hayden, Joy Page	War	Allied Artists
Fighting Lawman	Thomas Carr	Wayne Morris, Virginia Grey	Western	Allied Artists
Flame of Calcutta	Seymour Friedman	Denise Darcel, Patric Knowles, Paul Cavanagh	Drama	Columbia
The Flaming Urge	Harold Ericson	Harold Lloyd Jr., Cathy Downs	Drama	Independent
Flight Nurse	Allan Dwan	Joan Leslie, Forrest Tucker, Jeff Donnell	War drama	Republic
Flight to Tangier	Charles Marquis Warren	Jack Palance, Joan Fontaine, Corinne Calvet	Crime	Paramount
Forever Female	Irving Rapper	Ginger Rogers, William Holden, Paul Douglas	Comedy	Paramount
Forbidden	Rudolph Maté	Tony Curtis, Joanne Dru	Film noir	Universal; remake of 1932 film
Fort Ti	William Castle	George Montgomery, Joan Vohs	Western	Columbia
Fort Vengeance	Lesley Selander	James Craig, Rita Moreno, Reginald Denny	Western	Allied Artists
Francis Covers the Big Town	Arthur Lubin	Donald O'Connor, Yvette Duguay	Comedy	Universal
From Here to Eternity	Fred Zinnemann	Montgomery Clift, Deborah Kerr, Burt Lancaster, Frank Sinatra, Donna Reed	Drama, war	Columbia; based on James Jones novel; won 8 Academy Awards
Gentlemen Prefer Blondes	Howard Hawks	Marilyn Monroe, Jane Russell	Musical comedy	20th Century Fox; based on stage musical
Geraldine	R. G. Springsteen	John Carroll, Mala Powers	Comedy	Republic
The Girl Next Door	Richard Sale	Dan Dailey, June Haver	Musical	20th Century Fox; Haver's final film
The Girl Who Had Everything	Richard Thorpe	Elizabeth Taylor, Fernando Lamas, William Powell	Drama	MGM
Girls in the Night	Jack Arnold	Joyce Holden, Harvey Lembeck	Film noir	Universal
The Girls of Pleasure Island	F. Hugh Herbert	Don Taylor, Leo Genn, Audrey Dalton	Comedy	Paramount
Give a Girl a Break	Stanley Donen	Debbie Reynolds, Marge Champion, Gower Champion, Bob Fosse	Musical comedy	MGM
The Glass Wall	Maxwell Shane	Vittorio Gassman, Gloria Grahame	Film noir	Columbia
The Glass Web	Jack Arnold	Edward G. Robinson, John Forsythe, Marcia Henderson, Kathleen Hughes	Film noir	Universal
The Glory Brigade	Robert D. Webb	Victor Mature, Richard Egan	War	20th Century Fox
Glen or Glenda	Ed Wood	Timothy Farrell, Dolores Fuller	Drama	Film Classics
The Golden Blade	Nathan Juran	Rock Hudson, Piper Laurie, Gene Evans, Kathleen Hughes	Adventure	Universal
Goldtown Ghost Riders	George Archainbaud	Gene Autry, Gail Davis	Western	Columbia
The Great Jesse James Raid	Reginald LeBorg	Willard Parker, Barbara Payton, Tom Neal	Western	Lippert
The Great Sioux Uprising	Lloyd Bacon	Jeff Chandler, Faith Domergue, Lyle Bettger, Stephen Chase, Walter Sande, John War Eagle	Western	Universal
Guerrilla Girl	John Christian	Helmut Dantine, Irene Champlin	War	United Artists
Gun Belt	Ray Nazarro	Tab Hunter, Helen Westcott	Western	United Artists
Gun Fury	Raoul Walsh	Rock Hudson, Donna Reed, Philip Carey, Roberta Haynes, Lee Marvin	Western	Columbia
Gunsmoke	Nathan Juran	Audie Murphy, Susan Cabot	Western	Universal; not related to TV series with same name

== H-K ==
Title	Director	Cast	Genre	Notes
Half a Hero	Don Weis	Red Skelton, Jean Hagen	Comedy	MGM
Hannah Lee	Lee Garmes	Joanne Dru, John Ireland	Western	Independent; filmed in 3-D
Here Come the Girls	Claude Binyon	Bob Hope, Rosemary Clooney, Tony Martin, Arlene Dahl	Musical comedy	Paramount
The Hitch-Hiker	Ida Lupino	Edmond O'Brien, William Talman, Frank Lovejoy	Film noir	RKO
The Homesteaders	Lewis D. Collins	Bill Elliott, Robert Lowery	Western	Allied Artists
Hondo	John Farrow	John Wayne, Geraldine Page, Ward Bond, James Arness	Western	Warner Bros.
Hot News	Edward Bernds	Stanley Clements, Gloria Henry	Crime	Monogram
Houdini	George Marshall	Tony Curtis, Janet Leigh	Biographical	Paramount; story of Harry Houdini
House of Wax	André de Toth	Vincent Price, Carolyn Jones, Phyllis Kirk	Horror	Warner Bros.
How to Marry a Millionaire	Jean Negulesco	Lauren Bacall, Betty Grable, Marilyn Monroe, William Powell	Comedy	20th Century Fox
I Confess	Alfred Hitchcock	Montgomery Clift, Anne Baxter	Drama	Warner Bros.
The I Don't Care Girl	Lloyd Bacon	Mitzi Gaynor, Oscar Levant	Biography	20th Century Fox; story of Eva Tanguay
I Love Lucy	Edward Sedgwick	Lucille Ball, Desi Arnaz	Comedy	Desilu; feature-length version of TV series
I Love Melvin	Don Weis	Debbie Reynolds, Donald O'Connor	Comedy	MGM
I, the Jury	Harry Essex	Biff Elliot, Peggie Castle	Drama	United Artists; based on book by Mickey Spillane; remade in 1982
Inferno	Roy Ward Baker	Robert Ryan, Rhonda Fleming	Thriller, 3-D	20th Century Fox
Invaders from Mars	William Cameron Menzies	Helena Carter, Leif Erickson	Horror, Science fiction	20th Century Fox
Iron Mountain Trail	William Witney	Rex Allen, Slim Pickens	Western	Republic
Island in the Sky	William Wellman	John Wayne, Lloyd Nolan, James Arness	Drama	Warner Bros.
It Came from Outer Space	Jack Arnold	Richard Carlson, Barbara Rush	Sci-fi, 3-D	Universal
It Happens Every Thursday	Joseph Pevney	Loretta Young, John Forsythe	Comedy	Universal
Jack McCall, Desperado	Sidney Salkow	George Montgomery, Angela Stevens	Western	Columbia
Jalopy	William Beaudine	Leo Gorcey, Huntz Hall	Comedy	Allied Artists
Jamaica Run	Lewis R. Foster	Ray Milland, Arlene Dahl, Patric Knowles	Adventure	Paramount
Jennifer	Joel Newton	Ida Lupino, Howard Duff	Thriller	Allied Artists
Jeopardy	John Sturges	Barbara Stanwyck, Barry Sullivan, Ralph Meeker	Thriller	MGM
The Joe Louis Story	Robert Gordon	Coley Wallace, Paul Stewart	Sports	United Artists
The Juggler	Edward Dmytryk	Kirk Douglas, Milly Vitale	Drama	Columbia
Julius Caesar	Joseph L. Mankiewicz	Marlon Brando, James Mason, John Gielgud, Greer Garson, Deborah Kerr	Drama	MGM. Based on Shakespeare play; 5 Oscar nominations
Kansas Pacific	Ray Nazarro	Sterling Hayden, Eve Miller	Western	Allied Artists
The Kid from Left Field	Harmon Jones	Dan Dailey, Anne Bancroft	Sports comedy	20th Century Fox; Remade in 1979 film
Killer Ape	Spencer G. Bennet	Johnny Weissmuller, Carol Thurston	Adventure	Columbia
King of the Khyber Rifles	Henry King	Tyrone Power, Terry Moore, Michael Rennie	Adventure	20th Century Fox
Kiss Me Kate	George Sidney	Kathryn Grayson, Howard Keel, Ann Miller	Musical	MGM; based on 1948 stage musical
Knights of the Round Table	Richard Thorpe	Robert Taylor, Ava Gardner, Mel Ferrer	Adventure	MGM; 2 Oscar nominations

== L-N ==
Title	Director	Cast	Genre	Notes
The Lady Wants Mink	William A. Seiter	Dennis O'Keefe, Ruth Hussey, Eve Arden	Comedy	Republic
Last of the Comanches	Andre de Toth	Broderick Crawford, Barbara Hale, John War Eagle	Western	Columbia
Last of the Pony Riders	George Archainbaud	Gene Autry, Kathleen Case	Western	Columbia
The Last Posse	Alfred L. Werker	Broderick Crawford, Wanda Hendrix, John Derek	Western	Columbia
Latin Lovers	Mervyn LeRoy	Lana Turner, Ricardo Montalbán, John Lund	Musical comedy	MGM
Law and Order	Nathan Juran	Ronald Reagan, Dorothy Malone	Western	Universal
The Lawless Breed	Raoul Walsh	Rock Hudson, Julie Adams, Hugh O'Brian	Western	Universal
Let's Do It Again	Alexander Hall	Jane Wyman, Ray Milland, Aldo Ray	Musical	Columbia
Lili	Charles Walters	Leslie Caron, Mel Ferrer, Jean-Pierre Aumont, Zsa Zsa Gabor	Musical	MGM; 5 Oscar nominations
A Lion Is in the Streets	Raoul Walsh	James Cagney, Barbara Hale	Drama	Warner Bros.
Little Boy Lost	George Seaton	Bing Crosby, Claude Dauphin	Drama	Paramount
Little Fugitive	Three directors	Richie Andrusco	Drama	Independent
The Lone Hand	George Sherman	Joel McCrea, Barbara Hale, Alex Nicol	Western	Universal
Loose in London	Edward Bernds	Leo Gorcey, Huntz Hall	Comedy	Allied Artists
The Lost Planet	Spencer Bennet	Judd Holdren	Science fiction	Columbia
Ma and Pa Kettle on Vacation	Charles Lamont	Marjorie Main, Percy Kilbride	Comedy	Universal; fifth of a series
The Magnetic Monster	Curt Siodmak	Richard Carlson, King Donovan	Science fiction	United Artists
Main Street to Broadway	Tay Garnett	Mary Murphy, Herb Shriner	Anthology	MGM; many cameos
The Man Behind the Gun	Felix Feist	Randolph Scott, Patrice Wymore	Western	Warner Bros.
Man Crazy	Irving Lerner	Neville Brand, Christine White, Irene Anders, Colleen Miller, John Brown	Drama	20th Century Fox
The Man from Cairo	Ray Enright	George Raft, Irene Pappas, Massimo Serato	Crime	Lippert
The Man from the Alamo	Budd Boetticher	Glenn Ford, Julie Adams, Hugh O'Brian	Western	Universal
Man in the Attic	Hugo Fregonese	Jack Palance, Constance Smith	Horror	20th Century Fox
Man in the Dark	Lew Landers	Edmond O'Brien, Audrey Totter	Thriller	Columbia
Man of Conflict	Hal R. Makelim	Edward Arnold, John Agar, Susan Morrow	Drama	Independent
Man on a Tightrope	Elia Kazan	Fredric March, Terry Moore, Gloria Grahame	Thriller	20th Century Fox
The Marksman	Lewis D. Collins	Wayne Morris, Elena Verdugo	Western	Allied Artists
Marry Me Again	Frank Tashlin	Robert Cummings, Marie Wilson	Comedy	RKO
Marshal of Cedar Rock	Harry Keller	Allan Lane, Phyllis Coates	Western	Republic
The Marshal's Daughter	William Berke	Laurie Anders, Hoot Gibson	Western	United Artists
Martin Luther	Irving Pichel	Niall MacGinnis, Pierre Lefevre	Biography	Independent; Co-production with West Germany
The Maze	William Cameron Menzies	Richard Carlson, Veronica Hurst	Horror	Allied Artists
Meet Me at the Fair	Douglas Sirk	Dan Dailey, Diana Lynn, Hugh O'Brian	Drama	Universal
Mesa of Lost Women	Ron Ormond, Herbert Tevos	Jackie Coogan, Richard Travis	Science fiction	Howco
Mexican Manhunt	Rex Bailey	George Brent, Karen Sharpe	Crime	Allied Artists
Miss Sadie Thompson	Curtis Bernhardt	Rita Hayworth, José Ferrer, Aldo Ray	Musical	Columbia; remake of 1928 and 1932 films
Mission Over Korea	Fred F. Sears	John Derek, Audrey Totter	War	Columbia
The Mississippi Gambler	Rudolph Maté	Tyrone Power, Piper Laurie, Julie Adams	Western	Universal
Mister Scoutmaster	Henry Levin	Clifton Webb, Edmund Gwenn	Comedy	20th Century Fox
Mogambo	John Ford	Clark Gable, Ava Gardner, Grace Kelly	Adventure	MGM; 2 Oscar nominations; Golden Globe for Kelly
Money from Home	George Marshall	Dean Martin, Jerry Lewis	Comedy	Paramount; 10th Martin and Lewis film
The Moon Is Blue	Otto Preminger	William Holden, David Niven, Maggie McNamara	Romantic comedy	United Artists
The Moonlighter	Roy Rowland	Barbara Stanwyck, Fred MacMurray	Western	Warner Bros.
Murder Without Tears	William Beaudine	Craig Stevens, Joyce Holden	Crime	Allied Artists
The Naked Spur	Anthony Mann	James Stewart, Janet Leigh, Robert Ryan	Western	MGM
The Neanderthal Man	Ewald Andre Dupont	Robert Shayne, Beverly Garland	Science fiction	United Artists
The Nebraskan	Fred F. Sears	Philip Carey, Lee Van Cleef	Western	Columbia
Never Wave at a WAC	Norman Z. McLeod	Rosalind Russell, Paul Douglas	Comedy	RKO
Niagara	Henry Hathaway	Marilyn Monroe, Jean Peters, Joseph Cotten	Suspense	20th Century Fox
No Escape	Charles Bennett	Lew Ayres, Sonny Tufts	Drama	United Artists
Northern Patrol	Rex Bailey	Kirby Grant, Gloria Talbott	Drama	Allied Artists

== O-S ==
Title	Director	Cast	Genre	Notes
Off Limits	George Marshall	Bob Hope, Mickey Rooney, Marilyn Maxwell	Comedy	Paramount
Old Overland Trail	William Witney	Rex Allen, Slim Pickens, Roy Barcroft	Western	Republic
On Top of Old Smoky	George Archainbaud	Gene Autry, Gail Davis	Western	Columbia
One Girl's Confession	Hugo Haas	Cleo Moore, Glenn Langan	Drama	Columbia
Pack Train	George Archainbaud	Gene Autry, Gail Davis	Western	Columbia
Paratrooper	Terence Young	Alan Ladd, Leo Genn	War	Columbia
Paris Model	Alfred E. Green	Marilyn Maxwell, Paulette Goddard, Eva Gabor, Barbara Lawrence	Comedy, drama	Columbia
A Perilous Journey	R. G. Springsteen	Vera Ralston, Scott Brady	Adventure	Republic
Perils of the Jungle	George Blair	Clyde Beatty, Phyllis Coates	Adventure	Lippert Pictures
Peter Pan	Clyde Geronimi	Voices of Hans Conried, Bobby Driscoll, Kathryn Beaumont	Animated	Disney
Phantom from Space	W. Lee Wilder	Ted Cooper, Noreen Nash	Science fiction	United Artists
Pickup on South Street	Samuel Fuller	Richard Widmark, Jean Peters, Thelma Ritter	Thriller	20th Century Fox
Plunder of the Sun	John Farrow	Glenn Ford, Diana Lynn, Francis L. Sullivan	Adventure	Warner Bros.
Pony Express	Jerry Hopper	Charlton Heston, Rhonda Fleming, Forrest Tucker	Western	Paramount
Port Sinister	Harold Daniels	James Warren, Lynne Roberts, Paul Cavanagh	Adventure	RKO
Powder River	Louis King	Rory Calhoun, Corinne Calvet	Western	20th Century Fox
The President's Lady	Henry Levin	Susan Hayward, Charlton Heston, John McIntire	Biography	20th Century Fox; story of Andrew Jackson
Prince of Pirates	Sidney Salkow	John Derek, Barbara Rush	Adventure	Columbia
Prisoners of the Casbah	Richard L. Bare	Gloria Grahame, Cesar Romero, Turhan Bey	Adventure	Columbia
Private Eyes	Edward Bernds	Bowery Boys, Joyce Holden	Comedy	Allied Artists
Problem Girls	E. A. Dupont	Helen Walker, Susan Morrow	Drama	Columbia
Project Moonbase	Richard Talmadge	Ross Ford, Donna Martell	Science-fiction	Lippert Pictures
Raiders of the Seven Seas	Sidney Salkow	John Payne, Donna Reed	Adventure	United Artists
Rebel City	Thomas Carr	Wild Bill Elliott, Marjorie Lord	Western	Allied Artists
The Redhead from Wyoming	Lee Sholem	Maureen O'Hara, Alex Nicol, Dennis Weaver	Western	Universal
Red River Shore	Harry Keller	Rex Allen, Lyn Thomas	Western	Republic
Remains to Be Seen	Don Weis	June Allyson, Van Johnson, Angela Lansbury	Comedy	MGM
Return to Paradise	Mark Robson	Gary Cooper, Barry Jones, Roberta Haynes	Adventure	United Artists
Ride, Vaquero!	John Farrow	Robert Taylor, Ava Gardner, Howard Keel, Anthony Quinn	Western	MGM
Roar of the Crowd	William Beaudine	Howard Duff, Helene Stanley	Sports drama	Monogram
Rob Roy, the Highland Rogue	Harold French	Richard Todd, Glynis Johns	Adventure	Disney
The Robe	Henry Koster	Richard Burton, Jean Simmons, Victor Mature, Michael Rennie, Richard Boone	Drama	20th Century Fox; 5 Oscar nominations, won 2
Robot Monster	Phil Tucker	George Nader, Claudia Barrett, Selena Royle	Science fiction	Astor Pictures
Rogue's March	Allan Davis	Peter Lawford, Richard Greene, Janice Rule	Drama	MGM
Roman Holiday	William Wyler	Audrey Hepburn, Gregory Peck, Eddie Albert	Romantic comedy	Paramount; Oscars for Hepburn, screenplay, costumes; 10 nominations
The Royal African Rifles	Lesley Selander	Louis Hayward, Veronica Hurst	Adventure	Allied Artists
Run for the Hills	Lew Landers	Sonny Tufts, Barbara Payton, Mauritz Hugo	Comedy	Realart
Saadia	Albert Lewin	Cornel Wilde, Rita Gam, Mel Ferrer	Drama	MGM
Sabre Jet	Louis King	Robert Stack, Coleen Gray, Richard Arlen	War	United Artists
Safari Drums	Ford Beebe	Johnny Sheffield, Douglas Kennedy	Adventure	Allied Artists
Saginaw Trail	George Archainbaud	Gene Autry, Connie Marshall	Western	Columbia
Salome	William Dieterle	Rita Hayworth, Stewart Granger, Judith Anderson, Charles Laughton	Drama	Columbia
Sangaree	Edward Ludwig	Fernando Lamas, Arlene Dahl, Patricia Medina	Historical	Paramount
San Antone	Joseph Kane	Rod Cameron, Arleen Whelan	Western	Republic
Savage Frontier	Harry Keller	Allan Lane, Dorothy Patrick	Western	Republic
Savage Mutiny	Spencer Gordon Bennet	Johnny Weissmuller, Angela Stevens	Adventure	Columbia
Scandal at Scourie	Jean Negulesco	Greer Garson, Walter Pidgeon	Drama	MGM
Scared Stiff	George Marshall	Dean Martin, Jerry Lewis, Lizabeth Scott, Carmen Miranda	Comedy	Paramount; 8th Martin and Lewis film
Sea Devils	Raoul Walsh	Rock Hudson, Yvonne De Carlo, Maxwell Reed	Adventure	RKO
Sea of Lost Ships	Joseph Kane	John Derek, Wanda Hendrix	Drama	Republic
Second Chance	Rudolph Maté	Robert Mitchum, Jack Palance, Linda Darnell	Thriller	RKO
Seminole	Budd Boetticher	Rock Hudson, Anthony Quinn, Barbara Hale	Western	Universal
Serpent of the Nile	William Castle	Rhonda Fleming, Raymond Burr, William Lundigan	Adventure	Columbia
Shadows of Tombstone	William Witney	Rex Allen, Jeanne Cooper	Western	Republic
Shane	George Stevens	Alan Ladd, Van Heflin, Jean Arthur, Brandon deWilde, Jack Palance, Ben Johnson	Western	Paramount; 6 Oscar nominations
Shark River	John Rawlins	Steve Cochran, Carole Mathews	Adventure	United Artists
She's Back on Broadway	Gordon Douglas	Virginia Mayo, Gene Nelson, Steve Cochran	Musical comedy	Warner Bros.
The Silver Whip	Harmon Jones	Dale Robertson, Rory Calhoun	Western	20th Century Fox
Sins of Jezebel	Reginald LeBorg	Paulette Goddard, George Nader, Margia Dean	Drama	Lippert Pictures
Siren of Bagdad	Richard Quine	Paul Henreid, Patricia Medina	Adventure	Columbia
Sky Commando	Fred F. Sears	Dan Duryea, Frances Gifford	Adventure	Columbia
Slaves of Babylon	William Castle	Richard Conte, Linda Christian	Adventure	Columbia
A Slight Case of Larceny	Don Weis	Mickey Rooney, Elaine Stewart	Comedy	MGM
Small Town Girl	László Kardos	Jane Powell, Farley Granger, Ann Miller	Musical	MGM
So Big	Robert Wise	Jane Wyman, Sterling Hayden, Steve Forrest, Nancy Olson, Martha Hyer	Drama	Warner Bros.; based on Edna Ferber novel
Sombrero	Norman Foster	Ricardo Montalbán, Pier Angeli	Drama	MGM
Son of Belle Starr	Frank McDonald	Keith Larsen, Dona Drake, Peggie Castle	Western	Allied Artists
So This Is Love	Gordon Douglas	Kathryn Grayson, Merv Griffin	Musical	Warner Bros.
South Sea Woman	Arthur Lubin	Burt Lancaster, Virginia Mayo, Chuck Connors	Adventure	Warner Bros.
Spaceways	Terence Fisher	Howard Duff, Eva Bartók	Science fiction	Lippert Films
Split Second	Dick Powell	Stephen McNally, Alexis Smith, Jan Sterling	Thriller	RKO
Stalag 17	Billy Wilder	William Holden, Don Taylor, Otto Preminger, Harvey Lembeck, Robert Strauss, Peter Graves	War	Paramount; Academy Award for Holden
The Stand at Apache River	Lee Sholem	Stephen McNally, Julie Adams	Western	Universal
The Stars Are Singing	Norman Taurog	Rosemary Clooney, Anna Maria Alberghetti	Musical	Paramount
Star of Texas	Thomas Carr	Wayne Morris, Paul Fix	Western	Allied Artists
The Steel Lady	Ewald André Dupont	Rod Cameron, Tab Hunter, John Dehner	Drama	United Artists
The Story of Three Loves	Vincente Minnelli, Gottfried Reinhardt	Pier Angeli, Kirk Douglas, Leslie Caron, Ethel Barrymore, James Mason, Farley Granger, Ricky Nelson	Anthology	MGM
The Stranger Wore a Gun	Andre DeToth	Randolph Scott, Claire Trevor, Joan Weldon	Western	Columbia
The Sun Shines Bright	John Ford	Charles Winninger, Arleen Whelan, Stepin Fetchit	Drama	Republic
Sweethearts on Parade	Allan Dwan	Ray Middleton, Lucille Norman	Drama	Republic
The Sword and the Rose	Ken Annakin	Glynis Johns, Richard Todd, James Robertson Justice	Adventure	Disney
Sword of Venus	Harold Daniels	Robert Clarke, Dan O'Herlihy	Adventure	RKO
The System	Lewis Seiler	Frank Lovejoy, Joan Weldon, Robert Arthur	Film noir	Warner Bros.

== T-Z ==
Title	Director	Cast	Genre	Notes
Take Me to Town	Douglas Sirk	Sterling Hayden, Ann Sheridan	Comedy, Western	Universal
Take the High Ground!	Richard Brooks	Richard Widmark, Karl Malden, Russ Tamblyn	War	MGM
The Tall Texan	Elmo Williams	Lloyd Bridges, Lee J. Cobb, Marie Windsor, Luther Adler	Western	Lippert
Tangier Incident	Lew Landers	George Brent, Mari Aldon	Thriller	Allied Artists
Target Hong Kong	Fred F. Sears	Richard Denning, Nancy Gates	Action	Columbia
Tarzan and the She-Devil	Kurt Neumann	Lex Barker, Joyce MacKenzie, Tom Conway	Adventure	RKO
Taxi	Gregory Ratoff	Dan Dailey, Constance Smith	Drama	20th Century Fox
Terminal Station	Vittorio De Sica	Jennifer Jones, Montgomery Clift	Drama	Columbia
Texas Bad Man	Lewis D. Collins	Wayne Morris, Elaine Riley	Western	Allied Artists
That Man from Tangier	Luis María Delgado, Robert Elwyn	Roland Young, Nancy Coleman	Drama	United Artists
Those Redheads from Seattle	Lewis R. Foster	Rhonda Fleming, Gene Barry, Agnes Moorehead, Teresa Brewer	Musical, Western	Paramount
Three Sailors and a Girl	Roy Del Ruth	Jane Powell, Gordon MacRae	Musical	Warner Bros.
Thunder Bay	Anthony Mann	James Stewart, Dan Duryea, Joanne Dru	Adventure, Drama	Universal
Thunder Over the Plains	André de Toth	Randolph Scott, Lex Barker, Phyllis Kirk	Western	Warner Bros.
Thy Neighbor's Wife	Hugo Haas	Cleo Moore, Hugo Haas, Kathleen Hughes	Drama	20th Century Fox
Time Bomb	Ted Tetzlaff	Glenn Ford, Anne Vernon	Suspense	MGM
Titanic	Jean Negulesco	Barbara Stanwyck, Clifton Webb, Robert Wagner	Biography	20th Century Fox; Oscar for screenplay
Tonight We Sing	Mitchell Leisen	David Wayne, Anne Bancroft	Musical	20th Century Fox
Topeka	Thomas Carr	Wild Bill Elliott, Phyllis Coates	Western	Allied Artists
Torch Song	Charles Walters	Joan Crawford, Michael Wilding, Gig Young	Drama	MGM
Trail Blazers	Wesley Barry	Alan Hale Jr., Lyle Talbot	Action	Allied Artists
Treasure of the Golden Condor	Delmer Daves	Cornel Wilde, Constance Smith, Finlay Currie	Adventure	20th Century Fox
Tropic Zone	Lewis R. Foster	Ronald Reagan, Rhonda Fleming	Drama	Paramount
Trouble Along the Way	Michael Curtiz	John Wayne, Donna Reed	Comedy	Warner Bros.
Tumbleweed	Nathan Juran	Audie Murphy, Lori Nelson	Western	Universal
The Twonky	Arch Oboler	Hans Conried, Gloria Blondell	Comedy	United Artists
Valley of the Head Hunters	William Berke	Johnny Weissmuller, Christine Larson	Adventure	Columbia
The Vanquished	Edward Ludwig	John Payne, Jan Sterling, Coleen Gray	Western	Paramount
The Veils of Bagdad	George Sherman	Victor Mature, Mari Blanchard	Adventure	Universal
Vice Squad	Arnold Laven	Edward G. Robinson, Paulette Goddard	Film noir	United Artists
Vicki	Harry Horner	Jeanne Crain, Jean Peters, Richard Boone	Crime drama	20th Century Fox; I Wake Up Screaming remake
Vigilante Terror	Lewis D. Collins	Wild Bill Elliott, Mary Ellen Kay	Western	Allied Artists
Walking My Baby Back Home	Lloyd Bacon	Donald O'Connor, Janet Leigh, Buddy Hackett	Musical	Universal
War Paint	Lesley Selander	Robert Stack, Joan Taylor	Western	United Artists
The War of the Worlds	Byron Haskin	Gene Barry, Ann Robinson	Science fiction	Paramount; based on H. G. Wells novel
White Lightning	Edward Bernds	Stanley Clements, Barbara Bestar, Steve Brodie	Sports drama	Allied Artists
White Witch Doctor	Henry Hathaway	Robert Mitchum, Susan Hayward	Adventure	20th Century Fox
Wicked Woman	Russell Rouse	Beverly Michaels, Richard Egan	Drama	United Artists
The Wild One	Laszlo Benedek	Marlon Brando, Lee Marvin	Drama	Columbia
Wings of the Hawk	Rudolph Maté	Van Heflin, Julie Adams	Western	Universal
Winning of the West	George Archainbaud	Gene Autry, Gail Davis	Western	Columbia
Woman They Almost Lynched	Allan Dwan	Audrey Totter, Joan Leslie	Western	Republic
Young Bess	George Sidney	Jean Simmons, Stewart Granger, Deborah Kerr, Charles Laughton	Biography	MGM

== Documentaries ==
Title	Director	Cast	Genre	Notes
The Living Desert	James Algar		Documentary	Oscar for Best Documentary

== Serials ==
Title	Director	Cast	Genre	Notes
Canadian Mounties vs Atomic Invaders	Franklin Adreon	William Henry, Susan Morrow	Serial	Republic
Commando Cody: Sky Marshal of the Universe		Judd Holdren, Aline Towne	Serial	Republic
Jungle Drums of Africa	Fred C. Brannon	Phyllis Coates	Adventure	12-part serial

== Shorts ==
Title	Director	Cast	Genre	Notes
All My Babies	George C. Stoney		Educational	
Baby Butch			Animated	
Ben and Me	Hamilton Luske		Animation	
Bully for Bugs	Chuck Jones	Looney Tunes	Animation	
Cat-Tails for Two	Robert McKimson	Looney Tunes	Animation	
Catty Cornered			Animation	
Designs on Jerry	Hanna-Barbera	Tom and Jerry	Animation	
Don's Fountain of Youth	Jack Hannah		Animation	
Duck Dodgers		Looney Tunes	Animation	
Duck! Rabbit, Duck!		Looney Tunes	Animation	
Johann Mouse			Animation	
Let's All Go to the Lobby			Animation	Intermission advertisement
Life with Tom	Hanna-Barbera	Tom and Jerry	Animated	
Mouse for Sale			Animation	
Pup on a Picnic		Tom and Jerry	Animation	
Puppy Tale		Tom and Jerry	Animation	
The Seafarers	Stanley Kubrick			30-minute short
The Simple Things		Mickey Mouse	Animation	7 minutes
Southern Fried Rabbit		Bugs Bunny	Animation	
Spooks!		The Three Stooges	Comedy short	
The Tell-Tale Heart	Ted Parmelee	narrated by James Mason	Animated short	Based on Poe story
Toot, Whistle, Plunk and Boom			Animated short	Disney educational film

== See also ==
- 1953 in the United States
