= Deadly Duo =

Deadly Duo may refer to:

- The Deadly Duo, 1971 Hong Kong Wuxia film
- Deadly Duo (film), 1962 American neo noir directed by Reginald Le Borg
- "Deadly Duo", an episode of the 2019 Indian animated series Chacha Chaudhary

== See also ==
- The Deadly Double, a board game released in November 1941, infamous for claims that the game's advertisements contained coded messages to secret agents, giving advance notice of the Pearl Harbor attack in December 1941
