= All I Desire =

1953 film by Douglas Sirk

- Film poster by Reynold Brown
- Directed by: Douglas Sirk
- Written by: Gina Kaus (adaptation)
- Screenplay by: James Gunn; Robert Blees
- Based on: Stopover; 1951 novel by Carol Ryrie Brink
- Produced by: Ross Hunter
- Starring: Barbara Stanwyck; Richard Carlson; Lyle Bettger; Marcia Henderson; Lori Nelson; Maureen O'Sullivan
- Cinematography: Carl E. Guthrie
- Edited by: Milton Carruth
- Color process: Black and white
- Production company: Universal International Pictures
- Distributed by: Universal Pictures
- Release dates: June 25, 1953 (Nashville, Tennessee); July 3, 1953 (Los Angeles)
- Running time: 80 minutes
- Country: United States
- Language: English
- Budget: $460,000
- Box office: $1.2 million (US) or over $2 million

All I Desire is a 1953 American drama film directed by Douglas Sirk and starring Barbara Stanwyck, Richard Carlson, Lyle Bettger, Marcia Henderson, Lori Nelson, and Maureen O'Sullivan. It is based on Carol Ryrie Brink's 1951 novel Stopover.

== Plot ==
In about 1910, Naomi Murdoch, who has not been back to see her husband or children in the small town of Riverdale, Wisconsin, since she abandoned them at the turn of the 20th century to become a stage actress, is struggling near the bottom of the bill in a traveling vaudeville show. One day, she receives a letter from her daughter Lily, inviting her to come home to attend Lily's acting debut in the high school senior play. A fellow vaudeville actress convinces Naomi to return to her family and pretend to be the successful international stage actress she told them she has become.

Naomi's arrival in Riverdale does not go unnoticed, and Clem, the town gossip, starts spreading the word. The first person he tells is Dutch Heinemann, the owner of the hunting and fishing store, whose affair with Naomi was part of the reason she left.

When she gets to her family's home, Naomi is greeted enthusiastically by Lily, but her elder daughter Joyce, who has taken on the role of running the household, is bitter about her mother's long absence. Her child Ted, who is friendly with Dutch, does not remember her. Henry, Naomi's husband and the principal at Lily's school, is unsure how he feels about Naomi being back, particularly because any controversy could threaten his impending promotion to superintendent, and he is in a fledgling relationship with Sara Harper, the drama teacher at the high school.

Lily performs to a full house, but most of the townspeople have come to gawk at Naomi rather than to see the play. After the play, the Murdochs host a party at their home, Naomi charms the high schoolers, and feelings between her and Henry begin to resurface. Naomi had planned to leave on the late train, but misses it because Lily secretly moves the hands back on their clock. Lily invites Naomi to stay for her graduation, and Henry agrees that Naomi should stay. Outside the house, Dutch waits for Naomi in vain.

The following morning, Naomi goes horseback riding with Joyce and Russ Underwood, Joyce's fiancé. They stop at a spot by a lake where Naomi and Dutch used to have their trysts, and Joyce and Russ continue to ride without Naomi. Dutch approaches Naomi, thinking that she purposefully sent them away in order to meet with him. Surprised to see him, Naomi rebuffs him and tells him that she does not want to resume their affair because it would create a scandal for her family. He is not deterred, and he says he expects a rendezvous with Naomi before she leaves the next day.

After Naomi arrives back at the house, Sara, who has seen that Henry still has feelings for Naomi, asks her to do a recitation at the graduation as a way to improve Naomi's reputation in the town. Joyce enters and tells Naomi the main reason she has been cold to her mother is that Naomi's return has been hard on Henry, and the two agree Naomi should leave right away. However, when Naomi tells Henry she plans to leave, the two talk and reconcile, much to the chagrin of Lily, who had hoped to travel with Naomi and have her use her (nonexistent) connections to establish the girl in the theatrical world.

Dutch sends his special signal to Naomi the morning of the graduation, and she meets him at their spot by the lake. She tells him to leave her alone, but he does not believe she no longer has feelings for him and tries to force himself on her. They struggle, and Naomi accidentally shoots Dutch with his rifle. Ted happens to be near, and he helps Naomi take Dutch to Dr. Tomlin, the town doctor. He says he thinks Dutch will live, but suggests Naomi leave to help spare her family's reputation. Lily wants to come with her, so Naomi finally confesses that her career has been a total failure.

Henry visits Dutch, and he is reassured, after seeing his wounds and anger, that Naomi wants nothing more to do with him. He encourages Joyce to let go of her anger toward her mother, and skipping the graduation, goes home to prevent Naomi from leaving. He asks her to forgive him for driving her away 10 years earlier, and they kiss.

== Cast ==
- Barbara Stanwyck as Naomi Murdoch
- Richard Carlson as Henry Murdoch
- Lyle Bettger as Dutch Heinemann
- Marcia Henderson as Joyce Murdoch
- Lori Nelson as Lily Murdoch
- Maureen O'Sullivan as Sara Harper
- Richard Long as Russ Underwood
- Billy Gray as Ted Murdoch
- Dayton Lummis as Col. Underwood
- Lotte Stein as Lena Maria Svenson
- Fred Nurney as Hans Peterson

Uncredited:

- Guy Wilkerson as Clem
- Thomas Jackson as Dr. Philip Tomlin
- Virginia Brissac as Mrs. Tomlin
- Brett Halsey as Chuck, Lily's classmate (John Lexington in the play)
- Stuart Whitman as Lily's classmate (Lord Richard "Dick" Bakersfield in the play)
- Henry Blair as Philip, Lily's classmate (who is "going to be a freshman at Yale")
- Guy Williams as high school play ticket taker

== Reception ==
The film has received critical acclaim from modern day critics. Rotten Tomatoes reports that 100% of critics gave the film a positive review, based on six reviews, with an average score of 7.2/10.

== Production notes ==
Douglas Sirk originally shot a darker, sadder ending, but the producer Ross Hunter substituted a happier one.

Hunter said Barbara Stanwyck worked for "little or no salary", and the $460,000 budget included 25% studio overhead. He also said the film "was when he learned how to put the money on screen" as a producer.

Richard Long, who has a horseback-riding scene with Stanwyck in the film, later played her eldest son in all 122 episodes of the series The Big Valley (1965–9).
