= Dear Phoebe =

American television series

- One of at least three title cards used for Dear Phoebe.
- Genre: Sitcom
- Created by: Alex Gottleib
- Starring: Peter Lawford; Marcia Henderson
- Country of origin: United States
- Original language: English
- No. of seasons: 1
- No. of episodes: 31

Production
- Producer: Alex Gottleib
- Running time: ca. 22 mins.
- Production company: Chrislaw Productions

Original release
- Network: NBC
- Release: September 10, 1954 – April 8, 1955

Two other title cards used for episodes of Dear Phoebe.

Marcia Henderson as Mickey Riley and Peter Lawford as Bill Hastings in a publicity photo for Dear Phoebe.

Dear Phoebe is an American sitcom about a male former college professor who poses as an elderly woman to write a newspaper advice column. It aired on NBC from September 1954 to April 1955. The series stars Peter Lawford and Marcia Henderson. Lawford co produced.

== Synopsis ==
Bill Hastings, a college professor in Los Angeles, California, leaves his job at UCLA to pursue a career as a journalist. He lands a job with the Los Angeles Daily Star, where his duties include writing the newspaper's advice column "Dear Phoebe," supposedly written by a fictitious elderly woman named Phoebe Goodheart.

At the newspaper, Bill meets sportswriter Michelle "Mickey" Riley. They both reside in Los Angeles, Bill at 165 La Paloma Drive and Mickey at 34 West Sunset Boulevard. They share a mutual attraction which Bill is open about, but their romance is a rocky one because Mickey prefers to hide her feelings for Bill by competing strongly with him for plum writing assignments from the newspaper's stingy and crusty old managing editor, Clyde Fosdick. Bill thus finds himself advising the readers of "Dear Phoebe" about their problems while having to deal with romantic ones of his own.

Also at the paper is Humphrey Winston Humpsteader, a young copy writer trying to make it big in the newspaper business who likes to spend time at Ye Olde Malt Shoppe, where the slogan is "Teenage Spoken Here." Humphrey is a strong young man able to rip telephone books in half and often gets into fights, although even a slight slap across his face is enough to put him out of action.

== Cast ==
- Bill Hastings...Peter Lawford
- Michelle "Mickey" Riley...Marcia Henderson
- Clyde Fosdick...Charles Lane
- Humphrey Winston Humpsteader...Joe Corey

== Production ==
The show was produced without a laugh track. The sponsor was Campbell's Soup.

In June 1959, Lawford bought 49 percent of the series from Alex Gottleib, Sam Norton, and Jerry Rosenthal. He already owned 51 percent.

Peter Lawford's wife Patricia Kennedy Lawford, sister of future U.S. president John F. Kennedy, makes a cameo appearance in an episode of Dear Phoebe.

== Broadcast history ==
Dear Phoebe premiered on September 10, 1954, and ran for 31 episodes, airing on NBC at 9:30 p.m. Eastern Time on Fridays throughout its run. It was cancelled after a single season, Reruns of the show then continued in its regular time slot until September 2, 1955.

During the summer of 1956, NBC broadcast reruns of Dear Phoebe in prime time from June to September. The 1956 reruns aired at 8:00 p.m. Eastern Time on Tuesdays, the last of them on September 11.

== Episodes ==
=== Original episodes ===
No.	Title	Directed by	Written by	Original release date
1	"Bill Gets a Job"	Unknown	Unknown	September 10, 1954
Bill Hastings begins his job at the newspaper as the writer of the newspaper's advice column, "Dear Phoebe." He meets a beautiful blond female sportswriter who works there, Mickey Riley, and personally intervenes in romantic problems she is having with her athletic boyfriend, Rocky. Guest star: Chuck Connors.
2	"The Kissing Bandit"	Unknown	Unknown	September 17, 1954
Mickey is displeased when Bill beats her to a story by landing an exclusive interview with a victim of the notorious "Kissing Bandit," so she helps bait a trap for the bandit.
3	"Psychologically Speaking"	Unknown	Unknown	September 24, 1954
Mickey becomes jealous when Mr. Fosdick arranges for Bill to visit a psychiatrist to help him with a bout of depression — and the psychiatrist turns out to be a beautiful woman.
4	"Bill's Black Book"	Unknown	Unknown	October 1, 1954
Bill and Mickey both come down with the mumps.
5	"Mickey's Engagement"	Unknown	Unknown	October 8, 1954
Bill is jealous when Mickey becomes engaged to an alleged socialite.
6	"The Hex"	Unknown	Unknown	October 15, 1954
Alternative title "Batter Up." When a hillbilly baseball player becomes attracted to Mickey, Bill takes advantage of the young man's superstitions to break up the romance.
7	"Mismated"	Unknown	Unknown	October 22, 1954
Bill and Mickey head to Mexico to investigate a racket involving fraudulent "quickie" marriages, taking Humphrey along to serve as a witness — and the three discover too late that not all the marriages are illegal.
8	"Bill Plays Cupid"	Unknown	Unknown	October 29, 1954
When a man who reads "Dear Phoebe" expresses the conviction that women are expensive, Bill fixes Mickey up with him on a blind date to prove him wrong.
9	"Phoebe's Birthday"	Unknown	Unknown	November 5, 1954
In an effort to boost the newspaper′s circulation, Mr. Fosdick makes public the "birthday" of the fictional Phoebe Goodheart, intending to give all the presents that readers send her to charity — but one of the gifts is a key sent by a gang of thieves.
10	"Supermarket Sam"	Unknown	Unknown	November 12, 1954
Mickey and Humphrey decide to play a trick on Bill, but they end up in trouble when their plans go astray.
11	"A Date for Mickey"	Unknown	Unknown	November 19, 1954
During a cozy dinner at Fung Loo's Chinese restaurant, Bill and Mickey make long-range plans for an exposé of a prefabricated-housing racket.
12	"A Million to One"	Unknown	Unknown	November 26, 1954
After a lonesome old lady who was a grateful reader of the "Dear Phoebe" column bequeaths $1,000,000 to Phoebe Goodheart for comforting her with the columns. Bill claims the money is his because he is "Phoebe Goodheart," but Mr. Fosdick says that the money belongs to the paper because it created the "Phoebe Goodheart" character.
13	"That's D'Amore"	Unknown	Unknown	December 3, 1954
After the glamorous Italian movie star Constanzia D'Amore begins making personal appearances in Los Angeles, Bill becomes enamored of her and writes a "Dear Phoebe" column in which he has Phoebe say that European women make better wives than Americans — and to prove his point, he invites the newspaper′s entire staff to see D′Amore′s latest film.
14	"That's a Bet"	Unknown	Unknown	December 10, 1954
Mr. Fosdick comes up with what he thinks is the perfect plan for curing Humphrey of his continual betting on horse races before he goes totally broke, and he enlists Bill and Mickey in his scheme.
15	"The Momster"	Unknown	Unknown	December 17, 1954
To prove to Mickey that he gets along with children, Bill tries to reform a disrespectful boy.
16	"The Christmas Show"	Unknown	Alex Gottleib & Barbara Hammer	December 24, 1954
Bill comes home to find Joey — a fatherless little boy he has befriended who is prone to mishaps — hiding in a cabinet after running away from military school. Joey's mother believes he ran away because he does not have a father to take him to the school′s father-son Christmas banquet. Bill tries to help Joey find his father in time for the banquet and eventually succeeds — but meanwhile, both the search and Mr. Fosdick′s refusal to allow the newspaper staff to hold an office Christmas party hamper Bill in his hopes for romance with Mickey. Guest stars: George Winslow, Jesse White, and Ruth Perrott.
17	"Lead Your Own Life"	Unknown	Unknown	December 31, 1954
Bill runs a "Key to Successful Marriage" contest in the "Dear Phoebe" column, and the winning couple, two ranchers from Montana, provide quite a shock.
18	"My Unmarried Wife"	Unknown	Unknown	January 7, 1955
When Bill tries a new approach to winning Mickey′s heart by writing in the "Dear Phoebe" column that "career girls make mediocre wives," Mickey challenges him on the statement.
19	"Bill's Baby"	Unknown	Unknown	January 14, 1955
After Bill finds an abandoned infant on his doorstep, he and Mickey become reluctant parents.
20	"And So to Wed"	Unknown	Unknown	January 21, 1955
Bill is startled when an angry woman who has mistaken him for a victim of amnesia comes into the newspaper′s office and accuses him of being the husband who abandoned her and their two children five years earlier.
21	"Out of My Mind"	Unknown	Unknown	January 28, 1955
Bill consults a psychiatrist after he begins to have frequent hallucinations in which he sees Mickey everywhere he goes. Meanwhile, Mickey goes to see the same psychiatrist because she is seeing similar apparitions of Bill.
22	"Mind Over Muscle"	Unknown	Unknown	February 4, 1955
Alternative title "The Will to Win." After Bill develops a theory that he can pick the winner of a boxing match by using simple psychology, he and Mickey bet against each other as to whether Humphrey can win a fight against a skilled boxer. Bill proves that a fighter's background and not his physical prowess makes him a winner, and when Mickey loses the bet she must pay up.
23	"What Price Women?"	Unknown	Unknown	February 11, 1955
Mickey is upset with Bill after he prints a letter in the "Dear Phoebe" column from a "Mr. 1066" which calls women the world's most expensive luxury and demands that they be abolished.
24	"See You in Jail"	Unknown	Unknown	February 18, 1955
Humphrey sends the wrong form letter to a woman who asked advice from the "Dear Phoebe" column concerning her boyfriend, who is on his way to jail. The form letter says, "It is not too late — help your true love escape," and Bill decides he has to do something before the woman acts on its advice.
25	"No Talent School"	Unknown	Unknown	February 25, 1955
The Forsythe Academy of Tomorrow′s Stars is a drama school that appears to be merely a front for a scheme to extract money from untalented students willing to pay high tuition, so Bill and Mickey team up to infiltrate the school posing as students and expose the scheme in a front-page exposé in the newspaper — but Bill cannot decide which Marlon Brando role he wants to copy.
26	"Humphrey Gets Drafted"	Unknown	Unknown	March 4, 1955
Humphrey has a rival for his girlfriend's affections — and she decides that she will date whichever of them joins the United States Army first.
27	"Mr. Fosdick Steps Out"	Unknown	Unknown	March 11, 1955
While trying to help Mr. Fosdick with his problems, Bill becomes involved in a blackmail plot.
28	"A Face for Phoebe"	Unknown	Unknown	March 18, 1955
Mr. Fosdick decides to give Phoebe Goodheart a huge publicity build-up, but this creates a problem for Bill: The fictional Phoebe is supposed to be an elderly woman, but Bill is the author of the "Dear Phoebe" column.
29	"Legal and Tender"	Unknown	Unknown	March 25, 1955
To keep himself from trying to live beyond his means, Bill plans an elaborate budget.
30	"Fire the Boss"	Unknown	Unknown	April 1, 1955
The employees of the newspaper file a complaint with the newspaper′s publisher which includes a list of over 200 complaints against Mr. Fosdick. In response, the publisher, who happens to be Mr. Fosdick's father, fires Fosdick.
31	"How's Your Horoscope?"	Unknown	Unknown	April 8, 1955
Bill becomes upset with his coworkers when they begin to guide their lives by their daily horoscopes, so he decides to debunk astrology to teach them the foolishness of doing it.

=== Other episodes ===
Although sources agree on Dear Phoebe′s 31-episode original run, they also list two additional episodes aired as reruns during 1955 after the broadcast of the show's last original episode, neither of which have titles or plot descriptions easily attributable to any of the 31 original episodes.

Title	Directed by	Written by	Rerun date
"Lonely Hearts Club"	Unknown	Unknown	May 20, 1955
Bill and Mickey each decide to expose the activities of lonely-hearts clubs. Mr. Fosdick and Humphrey help Bill, but Bill takes an interest in the person assisting Mickey — a beautiful woman.
"You Hypnotize Me"	Unknown	Unknown	May 27, 1955
Mickey's new boyfriend is a handsome athlete, and that upsets Bill — who then discovers that he taught psychology to the man in college.
