= Dayton Lummis =

American film, television and theatre actor

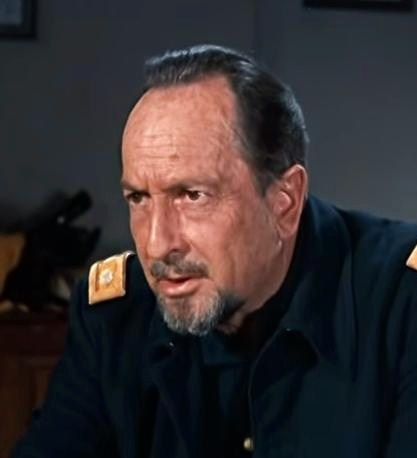
- Lummis in Bonanza, 1960
- Born: August 8, 1903; Summit, New Jersey, U.S.
- Died: March 23, 1988 (aged 84); Santa Monica, California, U.S.
- Occupation: Actor
- Years active: 1944–1975

Dayton Lummis (August 8, 1903 – March 23, 1988) was an American film, television and theatre actor. He was best known for playing the role of General Douglas MacArthur in the 1955 film The Court-Martial of Billy Mitchell.

Lummis died on March 23, 1988 in Santa Monica, California, at the age of 84.

== Partial filmography ==
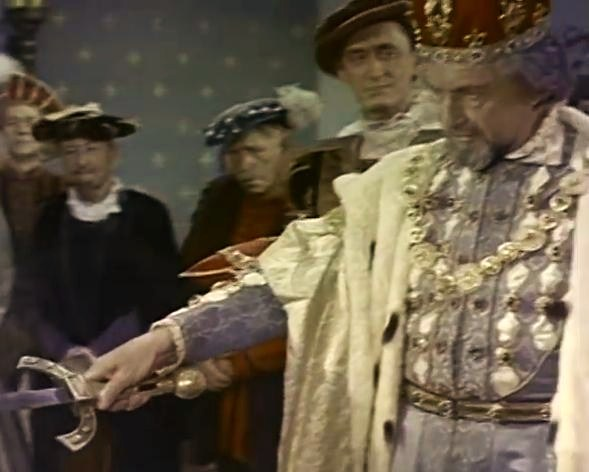
Lummis in Jack the Giant Killer, 1962

- Red Planet Mars (1952) - Radio Commentator (uncredited)
- The Winning Team (1952) - Graham McNamee (uncredited)
- Breakdown (1952) - Prison Warden (uncredited)
- Les Misérables (1952) - Defense Lawyer (uncredited)
- Something for the Birds (1952) - Speaker of the House (uncredited)
- Operation Secret (1952) - French Radio Broadcaster (Voice, uncredited)
- Bloodhounds of Broadway (1952) - Chairman (uncredited)
- Because of You (1952) - Philip Arnold (uncredited)
- Ruby Gentry (1952) - Ruby's Attorney (uncredited)
- The Mississippi Gambler (1953) - John Sanford (uncredited)
- Tangier Incident (1953) - Henry Morrison
- Man in the Dark (1953) - Dr. Marston
- Port Sinister (1953) - Mr. Lennox
- Julius Caesar (1953) - Messala
- The President's Lady (1953) - Dr. May (uncredited)
- All I Desire (1953) - Colonel Underwood
- The Golden Blade (1953) - Munkar (uncredited)
- China Venture (1953) - Dr. Masterson
- How to Marry a Millionaire (1953) - Justice of the Peace (uncredited)
- The Glenn Miller Story (1954) - Colonel Spaulding, USAAF (uncredited)
- Dragon's Gold (1954) - Donald McCutcheon
- Loophole (1954) - Jim Starling
- Princess of the Nile (1954) - Prince Selim (uncredited)
- Demetrius and the Gladiators (1954) - Magistrate (uncredited)
- The Caine Mutiny (1954) - Uncle Lloyd (uncredited)
- 20,000 Leagues Under the Sea (1954) - Reporter from The Bulletin (uncredited)
- Return to Treasure Island (1954) - Captain Flint
- The Yellow Mountain (1954) - Geraghty
- Prince of Players (1955) - English Doctor
- The Prodigal (1955) - Caleb
- A Man Called Peter (1955) - Scottish Police Constable (uncredited)
- The Cobweb (1955) - Dr. Tim Carmody (uncredited)
- My Sister Eileen (1955) - Mr. Wallace (uncredited)
- The View from Pompey's Head (1955) - Charles Barlowe
- Sudden Danger (1955) - Raymond Wilkins
- The Spoilers (1955) - Wheaton
- The Court-Martial of Billy Mitchell (1955) - General Douglas MacArthur
- Alfred Hitchcock Presents (Season 2 Episode 9: "Crack of Doom") - Tom Ackley
- Alfred Hitchcock Presents (Season 2 Episode 13: "Mr. Blanchard's Secret") - Charles Blanchard
- High Society (1956) - H. Stuyvesant Jones
- Over-Exposed (1956) - Horace Sutherland
- The First Texan (1956) - Stephen Austin
- The Bad Seed (1956) - The Doctor (uncredited)
- Showdown at Abilene (1956) - Jack Bedford
- The Wrong Man (1956) - Judge Groat
- Monkey on My Back (1957) - J.L. McAvoy
- Alfred Hitchcock Presents (Season 3 Episode 32: "Listen, Listen...!") - Police Sergeant Oliver
- From Hell to Texas (1958) - Padre (uncredited)
- Compulsion (1959) - Dr. Allwyn - Psychiatrist (uncredited)
- Elmer Gantry (1960) - Eddington
- The Rifleman (1960 Season 2 Episode 27: "Lariat") - Colonel Craig
- The Music Box Kid (1960) - Father Gorman
- Spartacus (1960) - Symmachus (uncredited)
- The Flight That Disappeared (1961) - Dr. Carl Morris
- Deadly Duo (1962) - Thorne Fletcher
- Jack the Giant Killer (1962) - King Mark
- Beauty and the Beast (1962) - Roderick
- Mooncussers (1962) - Commissioner
- Papa's Delicate Condition (1963) - Doctor (uncredited)
- Moonfire (1970) - Fuentes
