= The Longhorn =

1951 film by Lewis D. Collins

- Theatrical film poster
- Directed by: Lewis D. Collins
- Written by: Daniel B. Ullman
- Produced by: Vincent M. Fennelly
- Starring: Wild Bill Elliott; Myron Healey; Phyllis Coates
- Cinematography: Ernest Miller
- Edited by: Richard V. Heermance
- Music by: Raoul Kraushaar; Mort Glickman
- Production company: Frontier Pictures
- Distributed by: Monogram Pictures
- Release date: November 25, 1951
- Running time: 70 minutes
- Country: United States
- Language: English

The Longhorn is a 1951 American Western film directed by Lewis D. Collins and starring Wild Bill Elliott, Myron Healey and Phyllis Coates. It was shot at the Iverson Ranch. The film was remade in 1956 as Canyon River.

== Plot ==
Wyoming rancher Jim Kirk flees three bandits intent on robbing the money that he had earned by selling his Texas Longhorn herd. Back at his ranch, Kirk explains to his cowhand Andy that he is carrying a cashier's check because he feared being robbed.

Kirk tells Andy that the price for Longhorns has fallen steeply and that he has a plan to breed Longhorns with Hereford cattle. He shows Andy a prototype that he has bred that will have the stamina of a Longhorn and yield as much beef as would a pure Hereford. The only place to acquire Herefords is in Oregon, and the prospect of driving them all the way back to Wyoming seems insane to everyone but Kirk. When Kirk deposits his check in town, Andy meets with Latimer, the gang leader who engineered the failed robbery. Andy tells Latimer about Kirk's plan, and they agree to hijack the Herefords as Kirk drives them back to his ranch.

On their way to Oregon, Andy is shot by Indian horse thieves. Kirk walks on foot for miles to find a doctor, who saves Andy's life. While Andy recovers, Kirk buys a herd of Herefords and tries to hire a road crew. Most men decline the offer because driving Herefords over the open range seems impossible. The only men who agree are a bunch of outlaws whom nobody else will hire. The cattle drive back to Wyoming is arduous, and the crew grows restless when their supply of meat is exhausted. Kirk refuses to butcher a Hereford to feed the men.

Andy plots the theft of the herd with Latimer, and they agree to start a stampede and force the cattle into a canyon, where they will kill Kirk and his crew. Just before Andy is supposed to start the stampede, Kirk informs Andy that he will be the foreman of the crew when they return to Kirk's ranch, and he also offers Andy an ownership stake in the herd. When the stampede begins, Andy regrets his betrayal and fires on Latimer and his henchmen. He is killed in the gun battle, but he helps to thwart Latimer's plan. Kirk arrives at his ranch with his Herefords.

== Cast ==
- Wild Bill Elliott as Jim Kirk
- Myron Healey as Andy
- Phyllis Coates as Gail
- I. Stanford Jolley as Charlie Robinson
- Lane Bradford as Purdy
- John Hart as Moresby
- Marshall Reed as Latimer
- William Fawcett as Ben - bartender
- Lee Roberts as Clark - Cowhand
- Carol Henry as Frank - henchman
- Zon Murray as Tyler
