= Peter Walker (actor) =

American film, stage and television actor

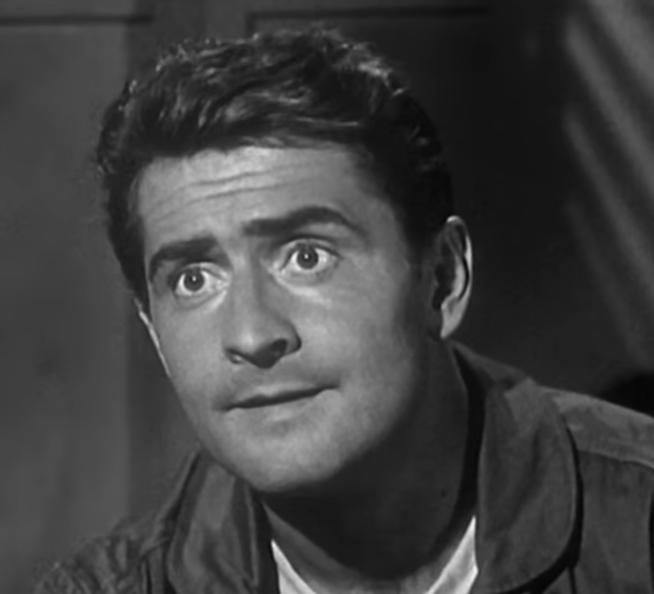
- Walker in Man with a Camera, 1958
- Born: Peter Thomas Walker; July 24, 1927 (age 99); Mineola, New York, U.S.
- Occupations: Film, stage and television actor

Peter Thomas Walker (born July 24, 1927) is an American film, stage and television actor. Born in Mineola, New York, he appeared in over 30 films and television programs, and is best known for playing district attorney Leonardo Durgin in the American soap opera television series Somerset.

Walker originally performed at the Avondale Playhouse. He later worked as a photographer and sculptor. He played the Narrator/Mysterious Man in the 1st National Tour of the musical Into the Woods.

== Partial filmography ==
- Jeunes maries (1954) – Un G.I.
- Paris Nights (1954)
- If All the Guys in the World (1955) – Johnny
- Madelon (1955) – Un American
- Maigret dirige l'enquete (1956)
- Valerie (1957) – Herb Garth
- The Wayward Girl (1957) – Tommy Gray
- Under Fire (1957) – Lieutenant Sarris
- Death Valley Days (1958) (Season 6 Episode 22: "The Girl Who Walked With A Giant") - Kit Carson
- Alfred Hitchcock Presents (1959) (Season 4 Episode 20: "The Diamond Necklace") - Jewelry Salesman
- Alfred Hitchcock Presents (1959) (Season 4 Episode 36: "Invitation to an Accident") - Cam
- The Twilight Zone (1960) (Season 1 Episode 23: “A World of Difference”) - Sam
- Alfred Hitchcock Presents (1960) (Season 6 Episode 12: "The Baby-Blue Expression") - Philip Weaver
- The Four Housemen of the Apocalypse (1962) – Minor Role (uncredited)
- W (1974) – Prison Official
- To Fly! (1976) – Ezekiel
- The Doctors (1980) – Edmund Powell
- The Adventure of the Action Hunters (1986) – Oliver
- Asa (1986) – Trooper
- If Lucy Fell (1996) – Bag Man
- Postcards from Paradise Park (2000) – Dudley
