= Canyon River (film) =

1956 film by Harmon Jones

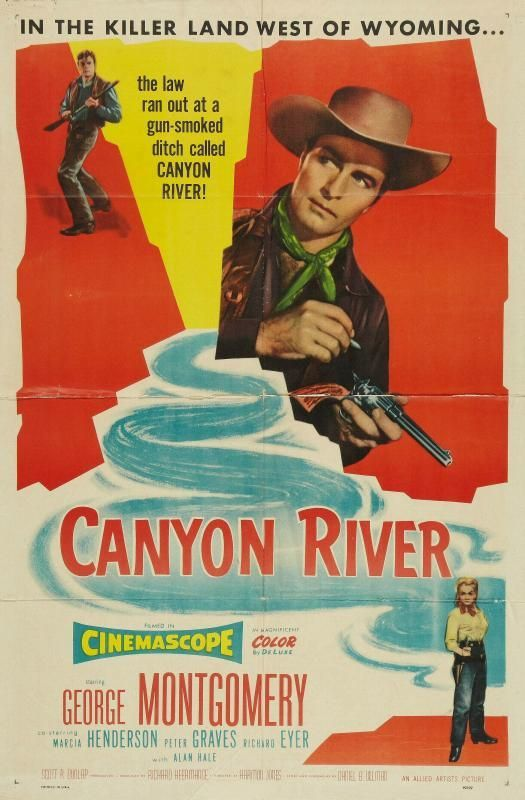
- Theatrical release poster
- Directed by: Harmon Jones
- Screenplay by: Daniel B. Ullman
- Story by: Daniel B. Ullman
- Produced by: Richard Heermance
- Starring: George Montgomery
- Cinematography: Ellsworth Fredericks
- Edited by: George White
- Music by: Marlin Skiles
- Color process: Color by DeLuxe
- Production company: Scott R. Dunlap Productions
- Distributed by: Allied Artists Pictures
- Release date: August 5, 1956
- Running time: 80 minutes
- Country: United States
- Language: English

Canyon River is a 1956 American CinemaScope Western film directed by Harmon Jones and starring George Montgomery.

It is a remake of the 1951 film The Longhorn.

It received mixed to positive reviews from critics.

== Plot ==
A cattleman, Steve Patrick, goes south to pick up breeding stock that he can cross-breed to withstand his Wyoming ranch's winters, but his foreman is in cahoots with a crooked businessman from the ranch's hometown in Wyoming. They plan to buy up ranchland in that area, do away with the cattleman and steal his herd he's driving in from Oregon or elsewhere. Near the end of the movie and before they reach a planned 'stampede to steal the cattle', Patrick likes Bob Andrews and offers him a share of his 6,000-acre (2,428.1 ha) ranch and also some cattle. Andrews decides this would be a great deal and tries to call off the 'crooked deal' he made with the crooked investor and his hired guns, but the cattle do stampede anyway and Graves is critically injured trying to stop them. In the end Patrick maintains his cattle and ranch ownership. So, the 'good guy' wins. On the trail drive, there had been a shortage of 'meat' to feed the crew, because the boss Patrick wouldn't kill a beef from his herd. The crew was about to mutiny, until a 'deer' was killed and steaks were served. Along the way a romance between Patrick and a widow, Janet Hale, blossoms. However, Andrews is also in love with her.

== Cast ==
- George Montgomery as Steve Patrick
- Marcia Henderson as Janet Hale
- Peter Graves as Bob Andrews
- Richard Eyer as Chuck Hale
- Walter Sande as Maddox
- Robert J. Wilke as Joe Graycoe
- Alan Hale Jr. as George Lynch
- John Harmon as Ben
- Jack Lambert as Kincaid
- William Fawcett as Jergens
