= The Wayward Girl (1957 film) =

1957 film by Lesley Selander

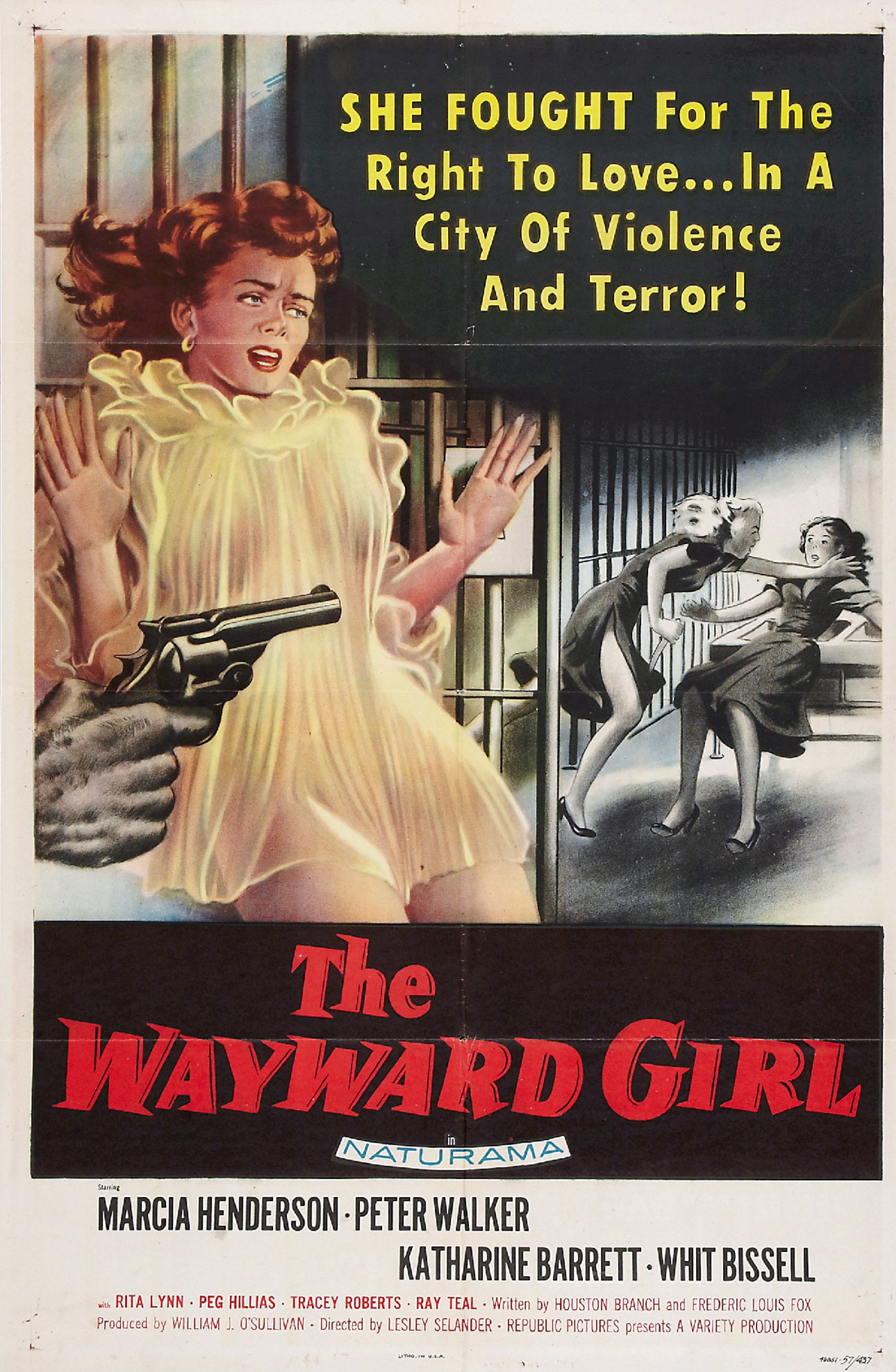
- Theatrical release poster
- Directed by: Lesley Selander
- Screenplay by: Houston Branch; Frederick Louis Fox
- Produced by: William J. O'Sullivan
- Starring: Marcia Henderson; Peter Walker; Katherine Barrett; Whit Bissell; Rita Lynn; Peg Hillias
- Cinematography: Jack A. Marta
- Edited by: Tony Martinelli
- Music by: Raoul Kraushaar
- Production company: Republic Pictures
- Distributed by: Republic Pictures
- Release date: September 22, 1957
- Running time: 71 minutes
- Country: United States
- Language: English

The Wayward Girl is a 1957 American drama film directed by Lesley Selander, written by Houston Branch and Frederick Louis Fox and starring Marcia Henderson, Peter Walker, Katherine Barrett, Whit Bissell, Rita Lynn and Peg Hillias. It was released on September 22, 1957 by Republic Pictures.

== Plot ==
A girl is erroneously convicted of manslaughter in the death of her oppressive stepmother's boyfriend, when in fact the stepmother killed him after the girl had knocked him out. Henderson gains release from prison via a parole-for-pay scheme of which she is unaware. She gets into more trouble when the man for whom she works makes advances and she runs away after injuring him. By the end of the film, the parole racket has been exposed, and Henderson has been exonerated of the murder.

== Cast ==
- Marcia Henderson as Judy Wingate
- Peter Walker as Tommy Gray
- Katherine Barrett as Frances Wingate
- Whit Bissell as Ira Molson
- Rita Lynn as Midge Brackett
- Peg Hillias as Hilda Carlson
- Tracey Roberts as Dot Martin
- Ray Teal as Sheriff
- Barbara Eden as Molly
- Ric Roman as Eddie Nolan
- Grandon Rhodes as Dist. Atty. Nevins
- Francis De Sales as Investigator Butler
- Jesslyn Fax as Older prisoner egging on the fight
- John Maxwell as Parole agent
- Herb Vigran as Used furniture buyer
