= Back to God's Country (1953 film) =

1953 film by Joseph Pevney

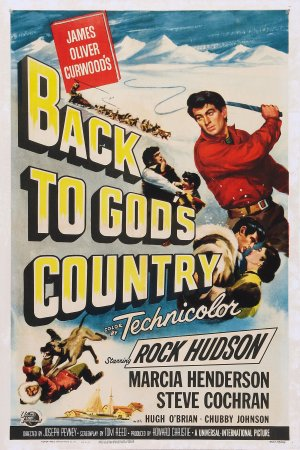
- Film poster by Reynold Brown
- Directed by: Joseph Pevney
- Screenplay by: Tom Reed
- Story by: James Oliver Curwood
- Produced by: Howard Christie
- Starring: Rock Hudson; Marcia Henderson; Steve Cochran
- Cinematography: Maury Gertsman
- Edited by: Milton Carruth
- Music by: Frank Skinner
- Color process: Technicolor
- Production company: Universal International Pictures
- Distributed by: Universal Pictures
- Release date: November 1953
- Running time: 78 minutes
- Country: United States
- Language: English

Back to God's Country is a 1953 American Northern film directed by Joseph Pevney starring Rock Hudson, Marcia Henderson and Steve Cochran.

== Plot ==
In the late 1800s in the remote western regions of North America, sinister businessman Paul Blake and his helper Frank Hudson kill an Eskimo, steal his map and viciously beat his sled dog.

Schooner captain Peter Keith and wife Dolores arrive with a cargo of furs. Blake and Hudson conspire to keep Keith's boat in dock until conditions are too icy to sail. Blake wants the captain's goods and his wife as well.

After persuading two of Keith's crew to abandon ship, Blake kills the boat's cook. He also attacks Dolores, which leads to a fight with Keith. Hudson is secretly plotting to forge a will that will result in his inheriting all of his partner's money, but nevertheless he comes to Blake's rescue in the fight, seriously injuring Keith.

Traveling by sled to a fort where he can receive desperately needed medical attention, Keith and his wife must overcome an attack by wolves, an avalanche and a guide who only pretends to be their friend. Blake finds the fake will and kills Hudson, then sets out after Keith, only to fatally encounter the Eskimo's loyal dog.

== Cast ==
- Rock Hudson as Peter Keith
- Marcia Henderson as Dolores Keith
- Steve Cochran as Paul Blake
- Hugh O'Brian as Frank Hudson
- Chubby Johnson as Shorter
- Tudor Owen as Fitzsimmons
- Arthur Space as Carstairs
- Bill Radovich as Lagi
- John Cliff as Joe
- Pat Hogan as Uppy
- Ivan Triesault as Reinhardt
- Charles Horvath as Nelson
