= Jocelyn Brando =

American actress (1919–2005)

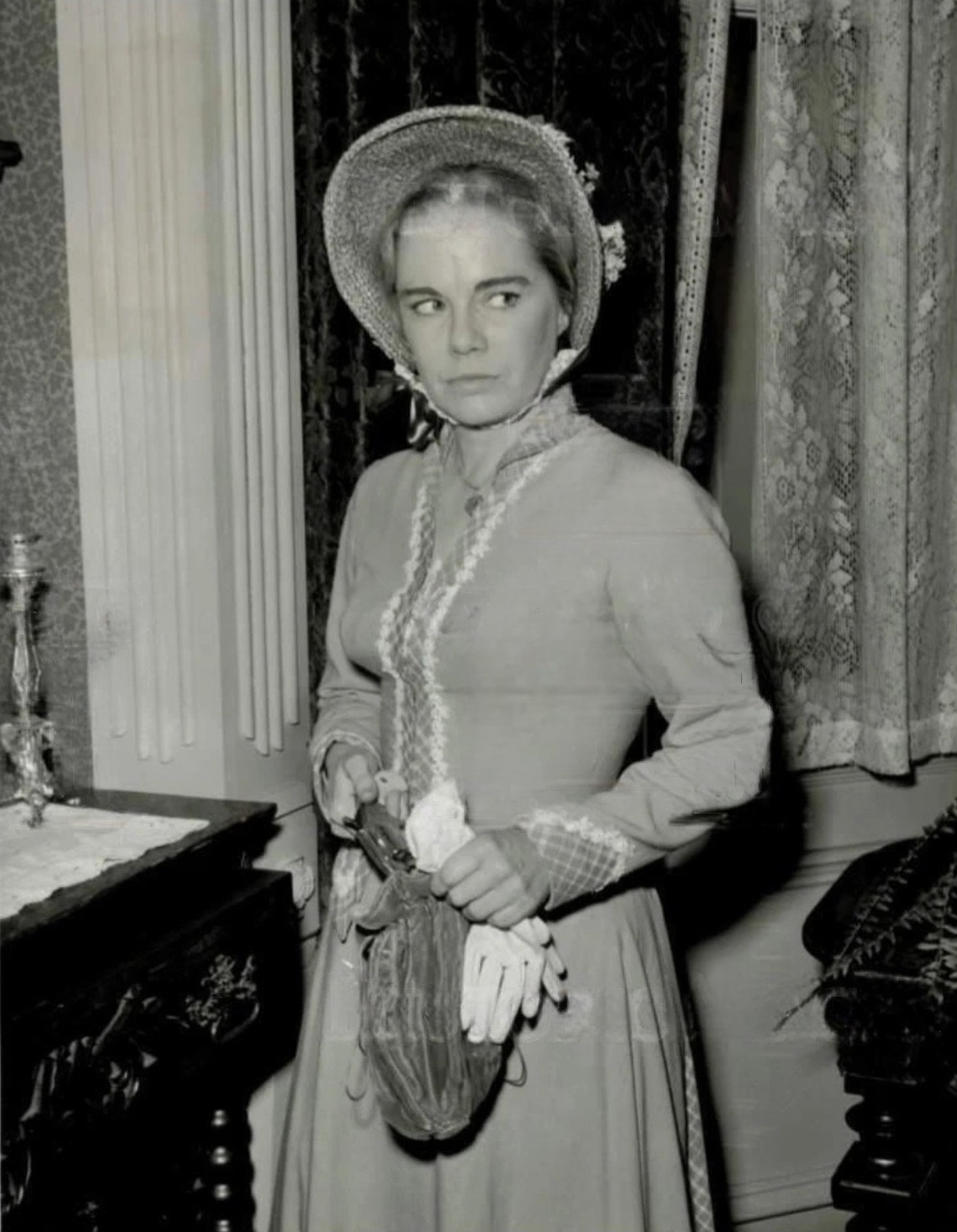
- Brando in Buckskin, 1959
- Born: November 18, 1919; San Francisco, California, U.S.
- Died: November 27, 2005 (aged 86); Santa Monica, California, U.S.
- Occupation: Actress
- Years active: 1942–1983
- Spouses: Don Hanmer (div. 1950) Eliot Asinof (m. 1950; div. 1955)
- Children: 2
- Relatives: Marlon Brando (brother); Cheyenne Brando (niece); Christian Brando (nephew)

Jocelyn Brando (November 18, 1919 – November 27, 2005) was an American actress, best known for her role as Katie Bannion in the film noir The Big Heat (1953). She was the sister of Marlon Brando.

== Early life ==
Brando was born in San Francisco, California, to Marlon Brando Sr. and Dorothy Pennebaker. Her father was a salesman who often travelled out-of-state and her mother was a stage actress, often away from home. She was the older sister of actor Marlon Brando and of Frances. She attended the American Academy of Dramatic Arts.

== Career ==
Brando came to the stage naturally, first appearing in a theatrical production under the direction of her mother, who was a principal in an Omaha community theater group. Her mother, Dorothy Brando, had given Henry Fonda his start in theater in this same group in October 1925 in the play "You and I". She made her Broadway debut in The First Crocus at the Longacre Theatre on January 2, 1942; the play closed after five performances. Her next appearance on Broadway came two months after her younger brother began his role as Stanley Kowalski in Tennessee Williams' A Streetcar Named Desire.

But even before that, in the fall of 1947, Jocelyn and Marlon became two of the first 50 or so members of New York's newly formed Actors Studio, Jocelyn studying with Elia Kazan, Marlon with Robert Lewis.

On February 18, 1948, she appeared in her second role on Broadway. She played Navy nurse Lieutenant Ann Girard in Mister Roberts, which starred family friend Henry Fonda in the title role. The play was a smash hit, running about three years (1,157 performances).

Brando did not complete the run of the play, appearing in the comedy The Golden State in the 1950–51 season, a flop that lasted only 25 performances, followed by a critically acclaimed but commercially unsuccessful 1952 revival of Eugene O'Neill's Desire Under the Elms, which ran for only 46 performances. Brando later appeared in a Broadway revival of O'Neill's Mourning Becomes Electra.

Back in uniform as a military officer, she made her film debut in Don Siegel's war drama China Venture (1953). When she first arrived in Hollywood, she gave an interview in which she commented on her brother's advice, or lack of it, to her: "Marlon is a sweet fellow, and he works very hard. I asked him for a tip about pictures, and he answered, 'Oh, I just say the words. That's all I know about picture acting.' He probably was smart at that to let me find my own way."

Brando's second film was her best-known role: detective Glenn Ford's wife in Fritz Lang's The Big Heat (1953). She also appeared in supporting roles in two of her brother's films, The Ugly American (1963) and The Chase (1966).

In the late 1960s, Brando joined the cast of the CBS soap opera Love of Life, where she created the role of Mrs. Krakauer, mother of Tess (Toni Bull Bua) and Mickey (Alan Feinstein). On primetime television, she played the recurring role of Mrs. Reeves on Dallas. Other TV series that featured her include Richard Diamond, Private Detective, Alfred Hitchcock Presents, Wagon Train (as Ada Meyers, a lonely woman on the train who finally finds love with an Irish sailor in S6E26's "The Michael Magoo Story" in 1963; in S1E28's "The Sally Potter Story" aired April 9, 1958 as Millie Bennett, mother of Johnny Crawford's Jimmy Bennett; and as Grace Lefton in The Martin Gatsby Story, which aired Oct. 10, 1962), Riverboat, The Virginian, Kojak, and Little House on the Prairie. Her final film role was in Mommie Dearest.

== Personal life and death ==
Brando was divorced from actor Don Hanmer on April 4, 1950. On April 13, 1950, she married author Eliot T. Asinof in Tarrytown, New York. She had two sons, Gahan Hanmer and Martin Asinof. She died at her Santa Monica home on November 27, 2005, at the age of 86.

== Filmography ==
Year	Title	Role	Notes
1945	Combat Fatigue Irritability	Sue (Bob's fiancée)	Short subject, starring Gene Kelly
1953	China Venture	Lieutenant Ellen Wilkins	
1953	The Big Heat	Katie Bannion	
1955	Ten Wanted Men	Corinne Michaels	
1956	Nightfall	Laura Fraser	
1957	Official Detective	Thelma	TV series, 1 episode
1958	Step Down to Terror	Lily Kirby	
1959	Alfred Hitchcock Presents	Alice	Season 4 Episode 34: "A True Account"
1959	Alfred Hitchcock Presents	Vice Principal Julia Conrad	Season 5 Episode 14: "Graduating Class"
1959	One Step Beyond	Ellen Larrabee	TV series, S1E3 "Emergency Only"
1961	Alfred Hitchcock Presents	Della Hudson	Season 6 Episode 37: "Make My Death Bed"
1961	The Explosive Generation	Mrs. Ryker	Uncredited
1962	Thriller	Myrtle Hooper	Season 2 Episode 24: "'Til Death Do Us Part"
1963	The Ugly American	Emma Atkins	
1964	The Alfred Hitchcock Hour	Emma Jane	Season 2 Episode 17: "The Jar"
1965	Bus Riley's Back in Town	Mrs. Riley	
1966	The Chase	Mrs. Briggs	
1967	A Welcoming Town	Ida Martin	
1978	A Question of Love	Mrs. Hunnicutt	TV movie
1978	Movie Movie	Mama Popchik; Mrs. Updike	(segment "Dynamite Hands") (segment "Baxter's Beauties of 1933")
1979	Good Luck, Miss Wyckoff	Mrs. Hemmings	
1980	Why Would I Lie?	Mrs. Crumpe	
1981	Mommie Dearest	Barbara Bennett	
1981	Dark Night of the Scarecrow	Mrs. Ritter	TV movie
1981	Darkroom	Mrs. Mingle	segment "Catnip"
1983	Starflight: The Plane That Couldn't Land	Mrs. Harvey	TV movie, (final film role)
