= Man in the Dark =

1953 film by Lew Landers

- Theatrical release poster
- Directed by: Lew Landers
- Screenplay by: George Bricker; Jack Leonard; Adaptation: William Sackheim
- Story by: Tom Van Dycke; Henry Altimus
- Produced by: Wallace MacDonald
- Starring: Edmond O'Brien; Audrey Totter; Ted de Corsia
- Cinematography: Floyd Crosby
- Edited by: Viola Lawrence
- Distributed by: Columbia Pictures
- Release dates: April 8, 1953 (premiere, New York City); April 9, 1953 (US general release)
- Running time: 70 minutes
- Country: United States
- Language: English
- Box office: $1.45 million (US)

Man in the Dark is a 1953 film noir drama 3-D film directed by Lew Landers and starring Edmond O'Brien, Audrey Totter and Ted de Corsia. It is a remake of the 1936 Ralph Bellamy film The Man Who Lived Twice.

It was the first Columbia Pictures film released in 3-D.

== Plot ==
Steve Rawley is serving a 10-year prison sentence for a Christmas Eve factory robbery that netted $130,000 which he hid somewhere. He agrees to experimental brain surgery which is meant to remove the 'criminal element' from him. He is paroled into the custody of Dr. Marsden, who performs this operation.

Insurance investigator Jawald, having learned about this situation from a police acquaintance, visits Marsden. Jawald is determined to find out from Steve where the money is hidden, but the doctor informs him that, if the surgery is successful, Steve will have amnesia; he will know nothing about his past, and will believe he lost his memory in a car accident. After a polygraph and other tests, Marsden is convinced Steve remembers nothing about the robbery.

Steve's release is imminent, but members of his old gang - Lefty, Arnie and Cookie - show up at the facility and kidnap him. Steve claims not to recognize any of them. Two investigators assigned by Jawald to secretly keep an eye on Steve give chase. The gang eludes them and take Steve to an apartment where Peg, who is said to be his girlfriend, greets him; he insists he does not know her. The men intend to make Steve tell them where the money is, and Peg believes he is faking his memory loss. She eventually grows angry at him and storms out. While his three captors play cards, Steve attempts phoning for help, but the men catch him and rough him up.

Cookie tries to spark Steve's memory by telling him about the robbery; while this does not work, it comes to the hoodlums' attention that a photo of Steve shows he is wearing a different suit when arrested than when he pulled the job. The men are certain this proves Steve hid the money at home when he went to change before trying to flee police. They go to his old house, which is boarded up. Steve finds a piece of paper with the number 1133 written on it, though he cannot remember writing this number down. Lefty forces Steve to write the number again and, while the three compare the handwriting, he tries to escape. They catch him, beat him up and take him back to the apartment. Peg returns, not knowing she is being followed by Jawald who, now that he has found where Steve is, assigns a colleague to watch the building.

Peg begins to believe Steve is telling the truth about the amnesia. She takes care of him as he tries to rest after the beating; he has an intense dream which seems to center around the amusement park which is nearby. Later, Lefty informs him he has one hour left to reveal the location of the money; Lefty tells his buddies that he has purposefully left the kitchen door unlocked, hoping Steve would escape and lead them to the loot. Steve and Peg do leave the apartment through that door; she wants to run away and start over, he wants to find the money for himself. They go to the post office, thinking that the number 1133 might denote a box there, but it does not. Remembering the dream, Steve decides they need to go to the amusement park. There, it becomes apparent the paper with the number on it is a ticket from the concession at which people leave their packages while attending the park. It has been a year since Steve checked his package in, so the pair who run the concession tell him it would have long ago been thrown away. He asks to look in back for himself and he finds the box, ostensibly candy he had won at a game in the park, with the money inside.

At this point, Peg tells Steve that if he intends to keep the money, she does not want to be with him. Steve sees that his former colleagues are following them; as Peg tries to leave, she is intercepted by Arnie. Atop a roller coaster, Steve fights Lefty, who falls to his death. Jawald has arrived with the police, who shoot Cookie. Arnie is arrested. After considering taking off with the money on his own, he chooses to hand it over, in hopes that he and Peg will be able to be together and live a normal life.

== Cast ==
- Edmond O'Brien as Steve Rawley
- Audrey Totter as Peg Benedict
- Ted de Corsia as Lefty
- Horace McMahon as Arnie
- Nick Dennis as Cookie
- Dayton Lummis as Dr. Marston
- Dan Riss as Jawald

== Production ==
The unexpected success of the previous year's Bwana Devil in 3-D by United Artists sparked other studios to release their own 3-D films. Columbia Pictures rushed a current project into production and completed it in 11 days. Although Warner Brothers touted House of Wax as "the first feature produced by a major studio in 3-D", Man in the Dark actually premiered two days earlier.

The amusement park setting was filmed at Ocean Park in Santa Monica.

== Reception ==
=== Critical response ===
When the film was released, Bosley Crowther, film critic for The New York Times, panned the film. He wrote, "Columbia's first stereoscopic film—a conspicuously low-grade melodrama ... called Man in the Dark, ... must be viewed through polaroid glasses to be seen for any effect whatsoever, is a thoroughly unspectacular affair."

More recently, critic Elliott Stein, writing for The Village Voice, discussed the effects used in the film: "This seems to be the 3-D flick that most exploits the short-lived medium. An endless array of stuff comes whiffling at your face—a lit cigar, a repulsive spider, scissors, forceps, fists, falling bodies, and a roller coaster. The prolific Landers may not have been a great director, but he was a pretty good pitcher."
