= Robert Blees =

American screenwriter

- Born: June 9, 1918; Lathrop, Missouri, U.S.
- Died: January 31, 2015 (aged 96); Menlo Park, California, U.S.
- Occupations: Writer; producer
- Years active: 1942–1981

Robert Blees (June 9, 1918 Lathrop, Missouri – January 31, 2015) was an American writer and producer of films and television. He died on January 31, 2015.

== Select filmography ==
- The Glass Web (1953)
- Cattle Queen of Montana (1954)
- Magnificent Obsession (1954)
- Autumn Leaves (1956)
- The Black Scorpion (1956)
- High School Confidential (1958)
- Screaming Mimi (1958)
- From the Earth to the Moon (1958)
- Whoever Slew Auntie Roo? (1972)
- Frogs (1972)
- Dr. Phibes Rises Again (1972)
- Project U.F.O. (1978–79) (TV series)
- Savage Harvest (1981)
