= Harmon Jones =

American film director

- Born: Harmon Clifford Jones; June 3, 1911; Regina, Saskatchewan, Canada
- Died: July 10, 1972 (aged 61); Los Angeles, California, U.S.
- Occupations: Film editor and director
- Employer: 20th Century Fox
- Children: Robert C. Jones
- Relatives: Leslie Jones (granddaughter)

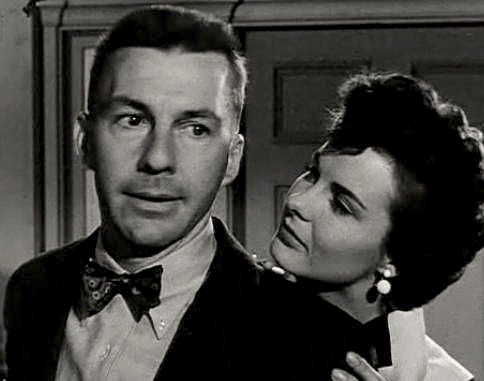
David Wayne & Jean Peters in As Young as You Feel - trailer (cropped screenshot)

Harmon Clifford Jones (June 3, 1911 – July 10, 1972) was a Canadian-born film editor and director who worked for many years at the 20th Century-Fox studio in Southern California. He is credited as the editor for about 20 feature films through 1950. In the middle of his career, he became a film and television director. Between 1951 and 1969, he directed about fifteen feature films as well as dozens of episodes of popular television series of the 1950s and 1960s.

== Career ==
There is apparently no published account of the beginnings of Jones' career; at the time, it was common for editors at the major film studios to work as uncredited assistant editors for several years prior to an initial assignment as an editor. Between 1944 and 1951 Jones is credited as the editor for more than 20 feature films; Hal Erickson has called him "one of the leading lights of the 20th Century Fox film-editing department". John Gallagher noted that "studio chief Darryl F. Zanuck was himself a brilliant editor and maintained the best editorial department in Hollywood." Jones' credits include four of the earlier films directed by Elia Kazan, including Gentleman's Agreement (1947).

Jones last credit as an editor is for Stella (1950). He then became a director for 20th Century Fox. As Erickson described it, "Jones graduated to the director's chair with the Monty Woolley vehicle As Young as You Feel (1951), which featured up-and-coming Marilyn Monroe. His first directorial projects showed promise, especially his brace of baseball pictures — Pride of St. Louis (1952) and The Kid from Left Field (1953). Soon, however, Jones was churning out routine westerns and so-so costume flicks." Some recent critics do not agree; thus Toby Roan has written, "Harmon Jones didn’t direct many features before heading to TV. His five Westerns — The Silver Whip (1953), City of Bad Men, A Day of Fury (1956), Canyon River (1956) and Bullwhip (1958) — are perfect examples of what a medium-budget studio Western could be. A Day Of Fury is a fantastic film, one of the best Westerns to come out of Universal in the 50s — and that’s saying something. If Jones had made more Westerns, I’m sure we’d be grouping him with directors like George Sherman, Gordon Douglas and Phil Karlson." Jones apparently left 20th Century Fox in 1954; his 1955 film Target Zero was produced by Warner Bros., and Day of Fury (1956) by Universal Studios.

In 1957 Jones began directing episodes of several popular television series such as Perry Mason, Rawhide and Death Valley Days. Jones' last credits are from 1969, for several episodes of television series.

Jones' editing of Gentleman's Agreement (1947) was nominated for the Academy Award for Best Film Editing. Jones was the father of Robert C. Jones, and the grandfather of Leslie Jones, both of whom are film editors who have also been nominated for Academy Awards. The editor for Jones' last feature film, Don't Worry, We'll Think of a Title (1966), was his son Robert C. Jones.

== Filmography ==
Jones' complete filmography is listed at the Internet Movie Database.

=== Feature film credits (as editor) ===
Jones editing credits are all for films produced by 20th Century Fox.

- Home in Indiana (1944)
- Irish Eyes Are Smiling (1944)
- Nob Hill (1945)
- The House on 92nd Street (1945)
- Shock (1946)
- Colonel Effingham's Raid (1946)
- Anna and the King of Siam (1946)
- 13 Rue Madeleine (1947)
- Boomerang (1947)
- Gentleman's Agreement (1947-editorial supervisor)
- Sitting Pretty (1948-editorial supervisor)
- Cry of the City (1948)
- Scudda Hoo! Scudda Hay! (1948editorial supervisor)
- Yellow Sky (1948)
- Mr. Belvedere Goes to College (1949)
- House of Strangers (1949)
- Pinky (1949)
- Mother Didn't Tell Me (1950)
- A Ticket to Tomahawk (1950)
- Panic in the Streets (1950)
- Stella (1950)

=== Feature film credits (as director) ===
Jones' credits through 1953 were for feature films produced by 20th Century Fox. After 1954 he had apparently become a freelance director of feature films and television episodes.

- As Young as You Feel (1951)
- The Pride of St. Louis (1952)
- Bloodhounds of Broadway (1952)
- The Kid from Left Field (1953)
- City of Bad Men (1953)
- The Silver Whip (1953)
- Gorilla at Large (1954)
- Princess of the Nile (1954)
- Target Zero (1955)
- A Day of Fury (1956)
- Canyon River (1956)
- Bullwhip (1958)
- The Beast of Budapest (1958)
- Wolf Larsen (1958)
- Don't Worry, We'll Think of a Title (1966)
