= China Venture =

1953 film by Don Siegel

- Theatrical poster
- Directed by: Don Siegel
- Written by: George Worthing Yates; Richard Collins
- Story by: Anson Bond
- Produced by: Anson Bond
- Starring: Edmond O'Brien; Barry Sullivan; Jocelyn Brando
- Cinematography: Sam Leavitt
- Edited by: Jerome Thoms
- Music by: Ross DiMaggio
- Production company: Columbia Pictures
- Distributed by: Columbia Pictures
- Release date: September 7, 1953
- Running time: 83 minutes
- Country: United States
- Language: English

China Venture is a 1953 American adventure war film directed by Don Siegel and starring Edmond O'Brien, Barry Sullivan and Jocelyn Brando. It was produced and distributed by Columbia Pictures. The plot concerns an American patrol sent into South China during World War II to rescue an important prisoner held by Chinese guerrillas.

== Plot ==
In 1945, during World War II, a Japanese admiral is severely injured in an airplane crash in a remote jungle. He possesses vital intelligence that may affect the course of the war. A joint American team of Marines and Navy personnel are deployed to locate the admiral and interrogate him before he dies from his wounds. The mission is plagued by both the Japanese occupiers and Chinese guerilla forces. Captain Matt Reardon and Commander Bert Thompson clash initially, but grow to respect one another before Thompson is murdered at the hands of Wu King.

The Japanese prisoner is successfully delivered to a US submarine, and his interrogation reveals that the Japanese military is determined to fight to the bitter end. The picture closes with documentary footage of a mushroom cloud, suggesting the Americans resort to atomic warfare to defeat Japan.

== Cast ==
- Edmond O'Brien as Capt. Matt Reardon
- Barry Sullivan as Commander Bert Thompson
- Jocelyn Brando as Lt. Ellen Wilkins
- Leo Gordon as Sgt. Janowicz
- Leon Askin as Wu King
- Lee Strasberg as Patterson
- Richard Loo as Chang Sung
- Dayton Lummis as Dr. Masterson
- Dabbs Greer as Galuppo
- Philip Ahn as Adm. Amara
- James Anderson as Cpl. Walters
- Alvy Moore as Carlson, the radio operator

== Theme ==
China Venture is almost unique among Seigel's films, in that it lacks the key character elements that normally preoccupy the director. The protagonists do not struggle with heroic vs. anti-heroic tendencies, nor does a femme fatale emerge to manipulate male characters. Pessimism, manifested in a damaged hero, is largely absent. Biographer Judith M. Kass writes:

China Venture is atypical of Seigel's films in several respects. Although there is an insane criminal type (Leon Askin) he has no opposite among the American servicemen. O’Brien's and Sullivan's determination to do their job is not presented as an outgrowth of any abnormal personality trait…The company is not doomed, simply threatened by the progression of events. Nor are the heroes—who are real, not anti-heroes—psychologically damaged. War may be a sphere which this group customarily inhabits, but in more traditional Seigel films, the war is a deranged microcosm of a larger world.

Kass adds that “the only woman present (Jocelyn Brando) is responsible for saving the admiral's life and is neither seductive nor fatal, rather the opposite, while retaining her femininity.”

== Sources ==
- Kass, Judith M. (1975). Don Seigel: The Hollywood Professionals, Volume 4 (1975 ed.). New York: Tanvity Press. p. 207. ISBN 0-498-01665-X.
- Sculthorpe, Derek. Edmond O'Brien: Everyman of Film Noir. McFarland, 2018.
