= City of Bad Men =

1953 film by Harmon Jones

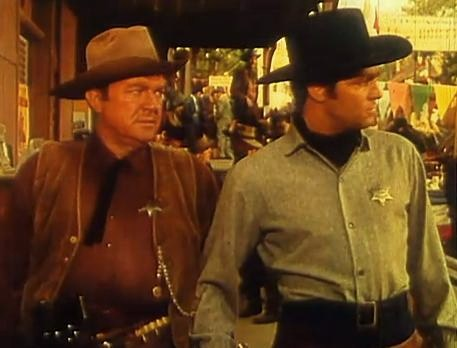
- Hugh Sanders (left) and Dale Robertson in City of Bad Men
- Directed by: Harmon Jones
- Written by: George W. George; George F. Slavin
- Produced by: Leonard Goldstein
- Starring: Jeanne Crain; Dale Robertson
- Cinematography: Charles G. Clarke
- Edited by: George A. Gittens
- Color process: Technicolor
- Production company: 20th Century-Fox
- Distributed by: 20th Century-Fox
- Release date: September 11, 1953
- Running time: 82 minutes
- Country: United States
- Language: English
- Budget: $740,000.

City of Bad Men is a 1953 American Western film directed by Harmon Jones and starring Jeanne Crain and Dale Robertson.

== Plot ==
A heavyweight championship fight between "Gentleman Jim" Corbett and Bob Fitzsimmons is coming to Carson City, Nevada at exactly the same time outlaw Brett Stanton and brother Gar return to town. Away for six years in Mexico, Brett has alienated his former love, Linda Culligan, who is now involved with Jim London, the fight's promoter. London's sister, Cynthia Castle, tries to attract Brett's interest, but he only has eyes for Linda.

Because the bout could sell as much as $100,000 in tickets, law-breakers like Johnny Ringo are also milling around, keeping Sheriff Bill Gifford on his toes. He plays a strategy where he asks Ringo, another outlaw, and Brett, to be deputies just for the week of the fight. Gifford's idea is that this will offer incentive to the men to keep their respective gangs in order and keep the peace in town, so everyone might enjoy the festivities. The three agree to do this but soon Brett is the only one still on board. He is actually scheming to steal the fight's proceeds.

A match-day decision by Linda to end her engagement to Jim changes Brett's plans; he decides to go straight. However, his brother Gar betrays him to Ringo, who goes through with the daring robbery. Brett has to exchange gunfire with Ringo and face down Gar - whom Ringo has mortally wounded. When it is all over, Linda and Brett are finally reconciled.

== Cast ==
- Jeanne Crain as Linda Culligan
- Dale Robertson as Brett Stanton
- Richard Boone as Johnny Ringo
- Lloyd Bridges as Gar Stanton
- Carole Mathews as Cynthia Castle
- Carl Betz as Deputy Phil Ryan
- Whitfield Connor as Jim London
- Hugh Sanders as Sheriff Bill Gifford
- Rodolfo Acosta as Mendoza
- Pascual García Peña as Pig
- John Doucette as Cinch
- Leo Gordon as Russell
- James Best as Deputy Gig
- Don Haggerty as Bob Thrailkill
- Frank Ferguson as Easterner at Training Camp
- John Daheim as James J. Corbett
- Gil Perkins as Bob Fitzsimmons

== Home media ==
City of Bad Men was released in 2014 as a "publish on demand" DVD in the United States.

== In popular culture ==
In episode five of the first season of the USA network series Graceland, the main character Mike (who is an undercover FBI agent) has a conversation with one of his targets, the ruthless Nigerian crime lord "Bello" (played by actor Gbenga Akinnagbe), where at one point the film is mentioned after Mike quotes a line from it. Bello is impressed by Mike's knowledge of the film and says he himself is a fan of it. He even shows Mike a copy of the film on DVD in a video store later on in the episode.

== Historical errors about fight ==
The actual Corbett-Fitzsimmons fight took place in an outdoor venue, the Racetrack Arena in Carson City. The movie has the fight being held in an indoor arena under artificial lights. In the movie, Bob Fitzsimmons is shown competing in tights that ran down the length of his legs. In reality, Fitzsimmons wore short trunks.
