= Marcia Henderson =

American actress

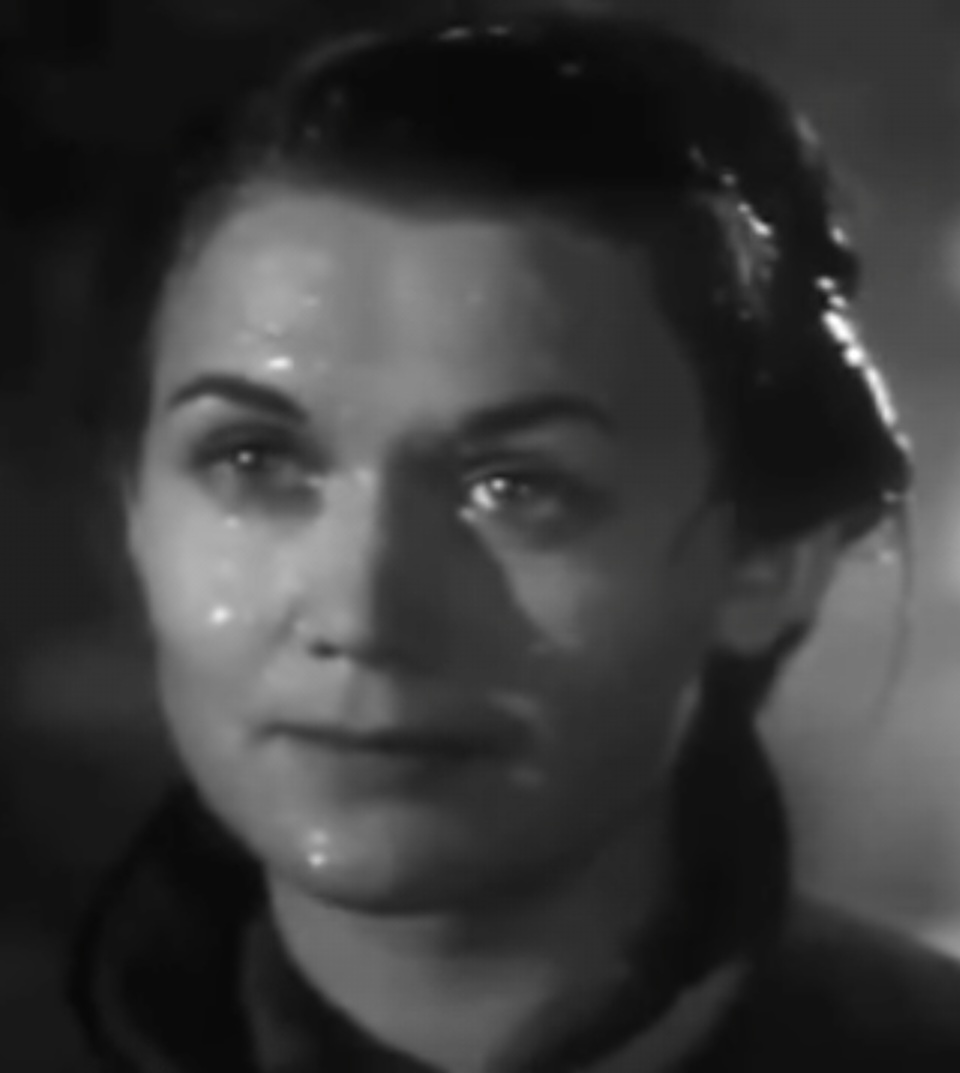
- Henderson in the TV series Four Star Playhouse (1952)
- Born: Marcia Anne Henderson; July 22, 1929; Andover, Massachusetts, U.S.
- Died: November 23, 1987 (aged 58); Yakima, Washington, U.S.
- Resting place: Clarksburg Cemetery, Clarksburg, Massachusetts, U.S.
- Education: American Academy of Dramatic Arts
- Occupation: Actress
- Years active: 1949–1962
- Spouses: Robert Brodsky (m. 1950; div. 1953) Robert Ivers (m. 1961)
- Children: 2

Marcia Anne Prestlien (née Henderson; July 22, 1929 – November 23, 1987) was an American actress. She made her Broadway debut as Wendy in the musical Peter Pan (1950), for which she won a Theatre World Award. Henderson also appeared in films such as All I Desire (1953), The Glass Web (1953), Canyon River (1956), and The Wayward Girl (1957).

== Early years ==
Born in Andover, Massachusetts, and raised in Williamstown, Massachusetts, Henderson was the daughter of Mr. and Mrs. John D. Henderson. She graduated from Williamstown High School in 1947 and from the American Academy of Dramatic Arts in 1949. Her high school activities included cheerleading and playing basketball and soccer. She also was editor of the school's newspaper and wrote articles for two professional newspapers in her area.

== Stage ==
Henderson played Wendy in the 1950 Broadway musical version of Peter Pan, which starred Jean Arthur as Peter Pan and is a different adaption of the story than the one made famous four years later starring Mary Martin. Her co-star was Boris Karloff in the dual roles of George Darling and Captain Hook. Reviewers at The New York Times and the New York Herald Tribune praised her performance, for which she won a 1949–50 Theatre World Award. The show ran for 321 performances, closing on January 27, 1951.

She had the lead in the touring company of The Moon Is Blue. She performed in the first play of the Williamstown Theatre Festival in 1955.

== Television ==
Henderson's first regular role on TV was playing Kathleen Anderson on The Aldrich Family. In 1951, she co-starred in Two Girls Named Smith, a 30-minute program broadcast on Saturdays on ABC. She co-starred with Peter Lawford in Dear Phoebe, a situation comedy on NBC in 1954–1955. Henderson had a lead guest role in a 1958 episode of The Restless Gun, with John Payne in the title role.

In 1959 she played secretary and personal assistant Dorothy Brown in the short-lived series World of Giants with co-stars Marshall Thompson and Arthur Franz, and appeared with Gene Barry in Bat Masterson, with Steve McQueen in an episode of Wanted Dead or Alive called "The Hostage", and with Henry Fonda in The Deputy, episode "The Silent Gun".

== Film ==
Henderson had featured roles in the 1953 dramas Thunder Bay starring James Stewart and All I Desire starring Barbara Stanwyck. She then had co-star billing in Back to God's Country with Rock Hudson, and The Glass Web with Edward G. Robinson the same year.

In 1954, she was one of the stars of the drama Naked Alibi along with Sterling Hayden, then two years later in a western, Canyon River. One of her later films, 1962's Deadly Duo, featured Henderson playing dual roles as twins.

== Personal life ==
Henderson married medical student Robert Brodsky October 15, 1950, in New York City. They divorced in December 1953. In 1961, she married actor Robert Ivers. They had two daughters, Alenda and Mallory.

Beginning in 1957, Henderson suffered from rheumatoid arthritis, "which severely limited and eventually ended her promising acting career" in the 1960s. She was later diagnosed with lupus, an autoimmune disease.

== Death ==
Henderson died on November 23, 1987, in Yakima, Washington, aged 58.

== Filmography ==
Year	Title	Role	Notes
1953	Thunder Bay	Francesca Rigaud	
1953	All I Desire	Joyce Murdoch	
1953	Back to God's Country	Dolores Keith	
1953	The Glass Web	Louise Newell	
1954	Naked Alibi	Helen Willis	
1956	The Naked Hills	Julie	
1956	Canyon River	Janet Hale	
1957	The Wayward Girl	Judy Wingate	
1958	The Restless Gun		Episode "Peligroso"
1959	Riot in Juvenile Prison	Grace Hartwell	
1959	Timbuktu	Jeanne Marat	
1959	A Dog's Best Friend	Millie Thurman	
1959	Wanted Dead or Alive (TV series)	Jullie Taggert	season 2 episode 6 (The Hostage)
1960	The Hypnotic Eye	Marcia Blaine	
1960	Natchez Trace	Ruth Henning	
1962	Deadly Duo	Sabena Spence / Dara Flagg	

== Radio appearances ==
Year	Program	Episode/source
1953	Radio Theater	It Grows on Trees
