= Thunder Bay (film) =

1953 American adventure film

- Theatrical film poster by Reynold Brown
- Directed by: Anthony Mann
- Written by: George W. George; George F. Slavin
- Screenplay by: Gil Doud; John Michael Hayes
- Story by: John Michael Hayes
- Produced by: Aaron Rosenberg
- Starring: James Stewart; Joanne Dru; Gilbert Roland; Dan Duryea; Marcia Henderson; Jay C. Flippen; Antonio Moreno; Robert Monet
- Cinematography: William H. Daniels
- Edited by: Russell F. Schoengarth
- Music by: Frank Skinner
- Color process: Technicolor
- Production company: Universal Pictures
- Distributed by: Universal-International
- Release dates: May 19, 1953 (premiere); May 20, 1953 (United States)
- Running time: 103 minutes
- Country: United States
- Language: English
- Box office: $2.4 million (US)

Thunder Bay is a 1953 American adventure film distributed by Universal International, produced by Aaron Rosenberg, directed by Anthony Mann, and starring James Stewart, Joanne Dru, Gilbert Roland, and Dan Duryea. It was shot in Technicolor and was released on May 20, 1953, which was James Stewart's 45th birthday. This film tells the story of two engineers drilling for oil in the Louisiana gulf while dealing with hostility of the local shrimp fishermen fearing for their livelihood, and features the first non-western collaboration between Stewart and Mann.

== Plot ==
Penniless but full of ideas, Steve Martin and Johnny Gambi, engineers who served in the Navy during World War II, walk down a quiet road on the gulf coast of Louisiana. Teche Bossier, owner of the Port Felicity Fish Co., agrees to drive them into the shrimping town Port Felicity for five dollars. On reaching their destination, Gambi rents a shrimp boat from Dominique Rigaud, although the fisherman's daughter, Stella, distrusts them immediately.

Gambi and Steve use the boat to show potential investor Kermit MacDonough the location in which they plan to drill for offshore oil. Claiming that he has designed a drilling platform that can withstand any storm, Steve estimates that by investing one million dollars now they will soon tap an oil reserve worth two billion. His enthusiasm is so infectious that MacDonough agrees to fund the project, against the advice of his secretary, Rawlins. However, MacDonough warns Steve that he must discover oil within three months, or his company, due to huge investments made in an offshore oil lease, will put them both out of work.

Several weeks later, Gambi meets and falls for Stella's younger sister Francesca, but, according to custom, she has been betrothed since childhood to Philippe Bayard. After singing a love song in the local gathering place Bon Chance, Philippe is upset to see Francesca enter with Gambi. Teche, who good-naturedly calls the oilmen "foreigners," agrees to help Steve and Gambi, but Stella refuses to accept Steve's statement that oil will be good for the town, claiming that she learned about "their kind" during her stay in Chicago. Nevertheless, the outsiders hire a crew and begin their search for oil.

When Teche sees dynamite charges being dropped into the gulf, he begs them to stop, believing that the explosions will kill the shrimp and worsen an already dismal shrimping season. Steve maintains that the charges are safe, but Teche returns to town and incites the fishermen to form an angry mob. Steve manages to scare the mob away by exploding sticks of dynamite behind them, and he placates Stella by warning Gambi to stay away from Francesca. Steve gently advises Francesca to "go back to [her] people."

With one month gone, Steve drives the building crew relentlessly, and the platform and rig are completed on schedule. He immediately orders the drilling crew to get started, and the exhausted Gambi is relieved when a hurricane warning gives the men an excuse to take the night off. Gambi and his men enter the Bon Chance with Francesca, and Philippe furiously punches his rival and starts a brawl. The sheriff arrests the oilmen and Francesca angrily denounces all the men.

During the storm Stella visits Steve at the rig, determined to have Gambi fired so that he stops seeing her sister. Steve explains to Stella that, if he could pull up a resource that has been in the earth for millions of years, then he will truly have accomplished something. Stella finally abandons her suspicion and kisses Steve, but back in town Philippe persuades Teche to help him destroy the oil rig. With the hurricane winds rising, Philippe climbs onto the platform and lights a bundle of dynamite, but Steve sees him and the two men fight. Philippe trips and disappears under the waves, and Steve, horrified, assumes that Stella was involved in Philippe's plot.

The rig survives the storm, and in the morning drilling begins. However, eight days before the deadline, MacDonough visits Steve and sadly delivers the news that the board of his company has voted to stop the drilling operation the following day, fearing a penalty for non-payment on their lease. MacDonough has already spent all of his own money, and the crew is unable to work for no pay. Gambi soon returns from town, announcing that he has just married Francesca. Steve punches Gambi, who in reply loudly chastises Steve for having driven him and the men too hard. Steve orders them all to leave, intending to do the drilling himself, whereupon Gambi hesitates and then persuades the crew to remain. While the men are drilling, they discover that the troublesome shrimp that have been clogging the valves are actually the huge golden shrimp that have so long eluded the local fishermen.

Steve later takes Francesca to the rig, infuriating Dominique, who inflames the fishermen by declaring that the oilmen will steal their daughters and destroy the town. At Stella's request, Teche goes to warn Steve about the impending mob on its way to the rig. There, Steve feigns ignorance about the golden shrimp and asks Teche if he can help him get rid of the creatures. He then addresses the furious mob to assure the men on their concerns: Francesca's marriage is a happy one and, moreover, oil will bring progress and prosperity to Port Felicity. Despite these words the mob decides to destroy the structure, but at that moment oil explodes through the rig and onto the platform. Later, the fishermen discover that the golden shrimp bed is huge, and consequently the conflict between the oilmen and the fishermen is resolved. Teche then convinces Steve that Stella was not involved in Philippe's plot and the lovers finally come together.

== Cast ==
- James Stewart as Steve Martin
- Joanne Dru as Stella Rigaud
- Gilbert Roland as Teche Bossier
- Dan Duryea as Johnny Gambi
- Jay C. Flippen as Kermit MacDonald
- Marcia Henderson as Francesca Rigaud
- Robert Monet as Phillipe Bayard
- Antonio Moreno as Dominique Rigaud
- Harry Morgan as Rawlings, MacDonald's assistant (as Henry Morgan)
- Fortunio Bonanova as Sheriff Antoine Chighizola
- Mario Siletti as Louis Chighizola

== Production ==
Production for this film started from late September to mid-November 1952. It was filmed in 1.37:1 Academy ratio while it was released in 1.85:1 widescreen.

The film was Universal-International's first with stereophonic sound. It was also originally planned to be photographed in 3-D, but those plans were scrapped sometime during production.

The film was shot in Morgan City, Louisiana with some scenes shot in New Orleans and on an oil-drilling barge in the Gulf of Mexico. While filming the scenes on-location in Louisiana, Dan Duryea slipped and fell from the roof of a tugboat (which appears throughout the film). He suffered a broken rib, contusion, and bruises but was able to continue filming after a day or two of rest.

Mann later expressed dissatisfaction with the film. "Its story was weak and we never were really able to lick it. I think it was a little too commercial and it fell down on its basic plot. Some of the things we showed were effective and beautiful I think, but I don’t think it was a very good script. Borden [Chase] worked on it, John Michael Hayes worked on it who was a good writer and has developed into a very good one. There were too many writers, and it became too fabricated. They wanted a picture with Jimmy Stewart and we concocted one."

== Release ==
The film premiered at Loew's State Theatre in New York City on Tuesday, May 19, 1953, demonstrating Universal-International's widescreen process and stereophonic sound. It began its release the following day.

== Reception ==
The film received favourable reviews although some complained that the sound from the film's stereophonic presentation, with its use of three speakers, was loud and distracting.

It opened with a gross of $42,000, the best opening for a Universal film at Loew's State.

== Home media ==
Universal first released this film on VHS on March 1, 1992. Then, on June 12, 2007, it was released on DVD as part of the James Stewart Screen Legend Collection, a 3-disc set featuring four other films (Next Time We Love, You Gotta Stay Happy, The Glenn Miller Story, and Shenandoah). This film was re-released on August 30, 2013, as a stand-alone DVD as part of the Universal Vault Series. (The DVD releases of the movie are not presented in the film's original 1.33:1 aspect ratio.)
