= The Glass Web =

1953 film by Jack Arnold

- Theatrical release poster
- Directed by: Jack Arnold
- Screenplay by: Robert Blees; Leonard Lee
- Based on: Spin the Glass Web by Max Simon Ehrlich
- Produced by: Albert J. Cohen
- Starring: Edward G. Robinson; John Forsythe; Marcia Henderson; Kathleen Hughes
- Cinematography: Maury Gertsman
- Edited by: Ted J. Kent
- Color process: Black and white
- Production company: Universal-International
- Distributed by: Universal Pictures
- Release date: November 11, 1953 (New York City)
- Running time: 81 minutes
- Country: United States
- Language: English

The Glass Web is a 1953 American 3-D film noir crime film directed by Jack Arnold and starring Edward G. Robinson, John Forsythe, Marcia Henderson and Kathleen Hughes. It is based on Max Simon Ehrlich's 1952 novel Spin the Glass Web.

== Plot ==
Henry Hayes is a well-respected crime researcher known for, and sometimes kidded, about his relentless perfectionism. Little is known of his social life. When he discovers he is being led on by gold-digger Paula Rainer, he kills her in accidental anger. He decides the best way to divert suspicion from himself is to immediately re-create the crime on his television show.

But producer Don Newell, who had been outside the dead woman's corridor at the time of the murder, notices that Hayes' perfectionism has him including items that only the murderer could have known; including which record was playing on her record player (Bing Crosby singing "Temptation").

Newell is able to trap Hayes into a confession, and Hayes is arrested.

== Cast ==
- Edward G. Robinson as Henry Hayes
- John Forsythe as Don Newell
- Marcia Henderson as Louise Newell
- Kathleen Hughes as Paula Rainer
- Richard Denning as Dave Markson
- Hugh Sanders as Detective Lt. Mike Stevens
- Jean Willes as Sonia
- Eve McVeagh as Viv
- Harry Tyler as Jake (as Harry O. Tyler)
- John Hiestand as Announcer
- Clark Howat as Bob
- Robert Nelson Plainclothesman (as Bob Nelson)
- John Verros as Fred Abbott
- Helen Wallace as Mrs. Doyle
- Benny Rubin as Tramp Comic

== Reception ==
=== Critical response ===
When the film was first released, The New York Times film critic Bosley Crowther gave the film a negative review, writing, "Aside from the price of silence, which seems a most original one, there is little else that is original or even startling in this film. Katherine Hughes, who plays the blonde number, makes a dainty dish of poison, it is true, but the rest, including the performances of the two gentlemen, is pretty routine. As for suspense, it is evident who did the murder all the time. And it is plain that Mr. Forsythe will not be butchered. So what goes with this sort of show? Pardon a slightly pointed comment, but it's the kind of film you might see on TV."

== Home media ==
Music rights issues kept the film off the home video market for many years until the 3-D Film Archive announced they would restore the film for a March 2025 release on the Blu-ray 3D format. The Glass Web was released by the 3-D Film Archive through Kino Lorber Studio Classics on Blu-ray on March 25, 2025 as a combo Blu-ray 3D, anaglyph 3D and 2-D release. It is the last feature filmed in Universal 3D to arrive on the market in any format.
