= Lori Nelson =

American actress and model (1933–2020)

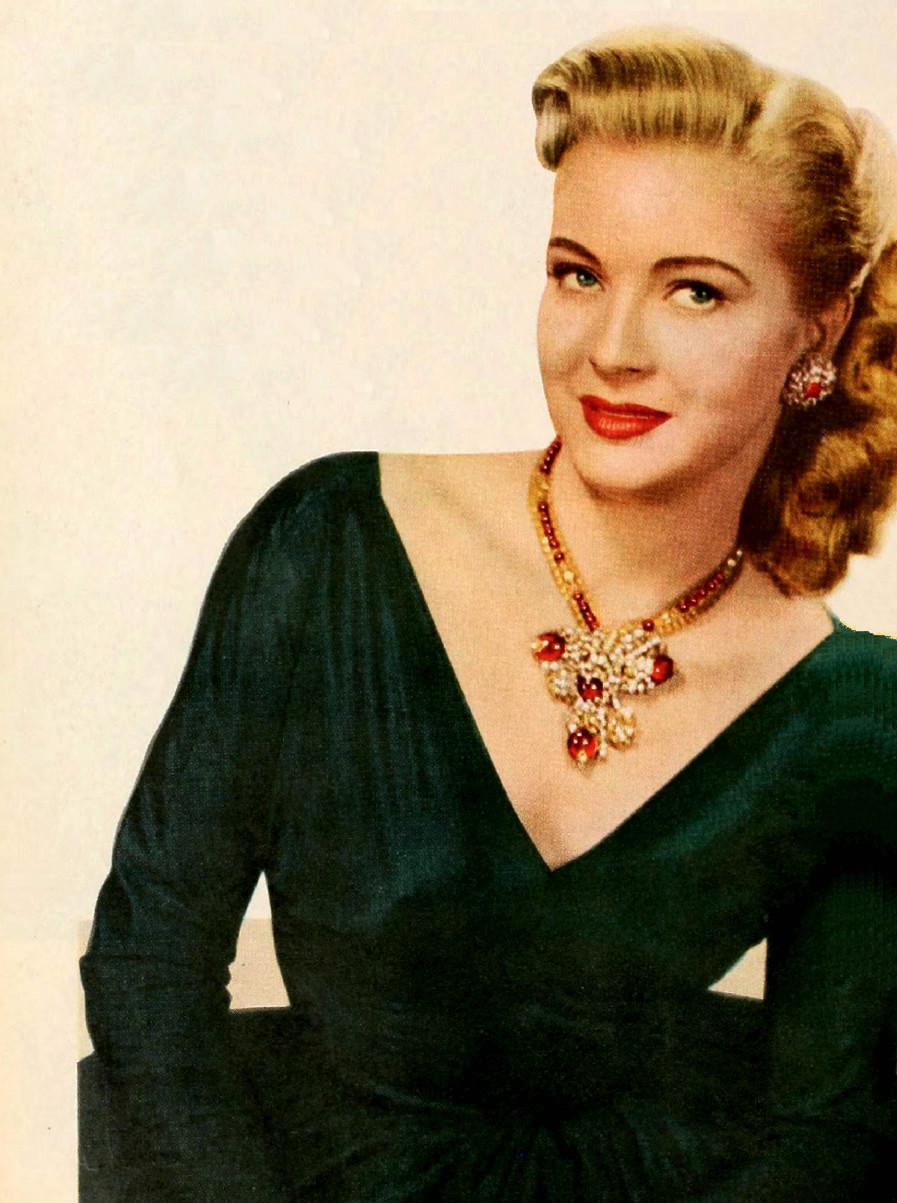
- Nelson in 1952
- Born: Dixie Kay Nelson; August 15, 1933; Santa Fe, New Mexico, U.S.
- Died: August 23, 2020 (aged 87); Los Angeles, California, U.S:
- Occupations: Actress, model
- Years active: 1952–2005
- Spouses: Johnny Mann (m. 1960; div. 1973) Joseph J. Reiner (m. 1983)
- Children: 2

Dixie Kay Nelson (August 15, 1933 – August 23, 2020), known professionally as Lori Nelson, was an American actress and model mostly active in the 1950s and early 1960s. She had roles in the TV series How to Marry a Millionaire and the films Revenge of the Creature, All I Desire, and I Died a Thousand Times.

== Early life ==
Born Dixie Kay Nelson in Santa Fe, New Mexico, Nelson was the only child of Mr. and Mrs. R. A. Nelson. Her father was superintendent of the American Metal Mine Company in Tererro, New Mexico. She was the great-grandniece of John J. Pershing. She began her career at the age of two, appearing in local theater productions. When she was four years old, her family moved to Encino, California. At the age of five, she won the title of "Little Miss America". During her childhood, she toured veterans' hospitals entertaining patients, acted in productions of little theaters, and modeled for photographers.

At age seven, Nelson contracted rheumatic fever which left her bedridden for four years. After she recovered, she returned to pageants and won the title of Miss Encino at age 17. After graduating from Canoga Park High School, Nelson worked as a model.

== Career ==
In 1950, she was signed to a seven-year contract with Universal-International after a studio scout saw her performing in a little theater production. She made her film debut in the 1952 Western Bend of the River. Later that year, she appeared as "Rosie Kettle" in the comedy film Ma and Pa Kettle at the Fair, followed by a supporting role in Francis Goes to West Point. In 1955, Nelson guest starred in two episodes of It's a Great Life, and reprised her role as "Rosie Kettle" in Ma and Pa Kettle at Waikiki. That same year, she co-starred in the Creature From the Black Lagoon sequel Revenge of the Creature and Underwater! with Jane Russell and Richard Egan.

Her supporting roles in films included the low-budget sci-fi story Day the World Ended (1955), directed by Roger Corman, and a big-budget Paramount Pictures comedy-Western, Pardners, starring Martin and Lewis in one of their final films together. Nelson had a featured role in I Died a Thousand Times, a 1955 remake of High Sierra, as well as in 1954's Destry, a remake of Destry Rides Again.

She was one of the leads in an 18th-century adventure story Mohawk. Nelson had top billing in the street-racing film Hot Rod Girl, also starring Chuck Connors, and the following year she co-starred opposite Mamie Van Doren as law-breakers sentenced to work on a "punishment" farm in Untamed Youth.

In November 1957, Nelson co-starred with Van Johnson in the TV movie The Pied Piper of Hamelin, which aired as a Thanksgiving Day special. Also in 1957, she was cast in one of the three lead roles in the syndicated sitcom How to Marry a Millionaire. Based on the 1953 film of the same name, Nelson starred as Greta Hanson, a brainy psychology major who works as an usher on a television game show. The series also starred Barbara Eden and Merry Anders. Nelson opted to leave the series after the first season, and her character was written out.

After leaving the series, Nelson continued with guest roles on Wagon Train, Tales of Wells Fargo, The Tab Hunter Show, Bachelor Father, and Armstrong Circle Theatre. She took a 10-year break from acting in 1961 and returned with a guest role in Family Affair in 1971. Dramatically Nelson worked sporadically thereafter. She made only three on-screen appearances in the 1990s, including a role in the direct-to-video release Mom, Can I Keep Her? (1998). Her last role was in the 2005 low-budget science fiction horror film The Naked Monster, in which she reprised her role from Revenge of the Creature.

== Personal life ==
=== Relationships ===
In the early 1950s, Nelson dated actor Tab Hunter. The relationship was fodder for gossip columnists at the time, and there was speculation that the two would marry. In his 2005 autobiography Tab Hunter Confidential: The Making of a Movie Star, Hunter admitted he considered marrying Nelson but was struggling to come to terms with his true sexuality. While Hunter was dating Nelson, he was secretly involved with figure skater Ronald Robertson. Nelson and Hunter eventually stopped dating but remained friendly. Hunter later cast Nelson in two guest-starring roles on his sitcom The Tab Hunter Show.

=== Marriages and children ===
On December 10, 1960, Nelson married composer and singing group leader Johnny Mann in Los Angeles. The couple had two daughters, then divorced in April 1973. In April 1983, Nelson married police officer Joseph J. Reiner.

=== Death ===
Nelson died on August 23, 2020, at her home in Porter Ranch, Los Angeles at the age of 87. She suffered from Alzheimer's disease for several years before her death.

== Filmography ==
Film
Year	Title	Role	Notes
1952	Bend of the River	Marjie Baile	
1952	Ma and Pa Kettle at the Fair	Rosie Kettle	
1952	Francis Goes to West Point	Barbara Atwood	
1953	All I Desire	Lily Murdoch	
1953	The All American	Sharon Wallace	
1953	Walking My Baby Back Home	Claire Millard	
1953	Tumbleweed	Laura	Alternative title: Three Were Renegades
1954	Destry	Martha Phillips	
1954	Underwater!	Gloria	Alternative title: The Big Rainbow
1955	Revenge of the Creature	Helen Dobson	
1955	Ma and Pa Kettle at Waikiki	Rosie Kettle	
1955	Sincerely Yours	Sarah Cosgrove	
1955	I Died a Thousand Times	Velma	
1955	Day the World Ended	Louise Maddison	
1956	Mohawk	Cynthia Stanhope	
1956	Pardners	Carol Kingsley	
1956	Hot Rod Girl	Lisa Vernon	
1957	Untamed Youth	Jane Lowe	
1957	Outlaw's Son	Lila Costain	Alternative titles: Gambling Man; His Father's Son
1991	Black Gaucho		Alternative title: Gaúcho Negro
1998	Mom, Can I Keep Her?	Stephanie	Direct-to-video release
2005	The Naked Monster	Dr. Helen Dobson	

Television
Year	Title	Role	Notes
1955	It's a Great Life	Vera Thompson	2 episodes
1955–56	Climax!	Mary	2 episodes
1957	The 20th Century Fox Hour	Cathy Devlin	Episode: "Threat to a Happy Ending"
1957	The Pied Piper of Hamelin	Mara	TV movie
1957–58	How to Marry a Millionaire	Greta Hanson	39 episodes
1959	Wanted: Dead or Alive	White Antelope aka Doris Albright	Episode: "Bounty for a Bride"
1959	The Texan	Elizabeth	Episode: "The Man Hater"
1959	Wagon Train	Charity Steele	Episode: "The Steele Family Story"
1959	The Millionaire	Lorraine Daggett	Episode: "Millionaire Lorraine Daggett"
1959	General Electric Theater	Sylvia	Episode: "Night Club"
1959	Sugarfoot	Ellen Conway	Episode: "The Gaucho"
1959	Tales of Wells Fargo	Susan	Episode: "Relay Station"
1960	Lock-Up	Honey Evans	Episode: "The Seventh Hour"
1960–61	The Tab Hunter Show	Various roles	2 episodes
1961	Dante	Cynthia Rogers	Episode: "Dial D for Dante"
1961	Laramie	Grace	Episode: "Trigger Point"
1961	Bachelor Father	Spring Loring	Episode: "Drop That Calorie"
1961	Whispering Smith	Mrs. Venetia Molloy	Episode: "Double Edge"
1961	Armstrong Circle Theatre	Mrs. Median	2 episodes
1971	Family Affair	Dr. Joan Blanton	Episode: "Goodbye, Mrs. Beasley"
1994	Secret Sins of the Father	Mrs. Lieber	TV movie
