= Deadly Duo (film) =

1962 film by Reginald LeBorg

- Directed by: Reginald LeBorg
- Written by: Owen Harris
- Produced by: Robert E. Kent
- Starring: Craig Hill; Marcia Henderson; Robert Lowery
- Cinematography: Gordon Avil
- Edited by: Kenneth G. Crane (as Kenneth Crane)
- Music by: Richard LaSalle
- Production company: Harvard Film
- Distributed by: United Artists
- Release date: February 1962
- Running time: 70 minutes
- Country: United States
- Language: English

Deadly Duo is a 1962 American mystery film directed by Reginald LeBorg and released by United Artists.

== Plot ==
After her auto-racing son is killed in a crash, wealthy Leonora wants custody of her grandson. Her daughter-in-law Sabena absolutely refuses, even when Leonora's attorney, Preston Morgan, approaches her with an offer of $500,000.

Sabena's twin sister, Dara, wants the money, no matter what. She and her accomplice Jay Flagg scheme to push Sabena's car off a cliff, then collect the half-million dollars for themselves. Their plot is foiled, however, and while Leonora sees the error of her ways, Sabena develops a romantic interest in Morgan.

== Cast ==
- Craig Hill as Morgan
- Marcia Henderson as Sabena / Dara
- Irene Tedrow as Leonora
- Robert Lowery as Jay Flagg
- Dayton Lummis as Fletcher

== See also ==
- List of American films of 1962
