= The Silver Whip =

1953 film by Harmon Jones

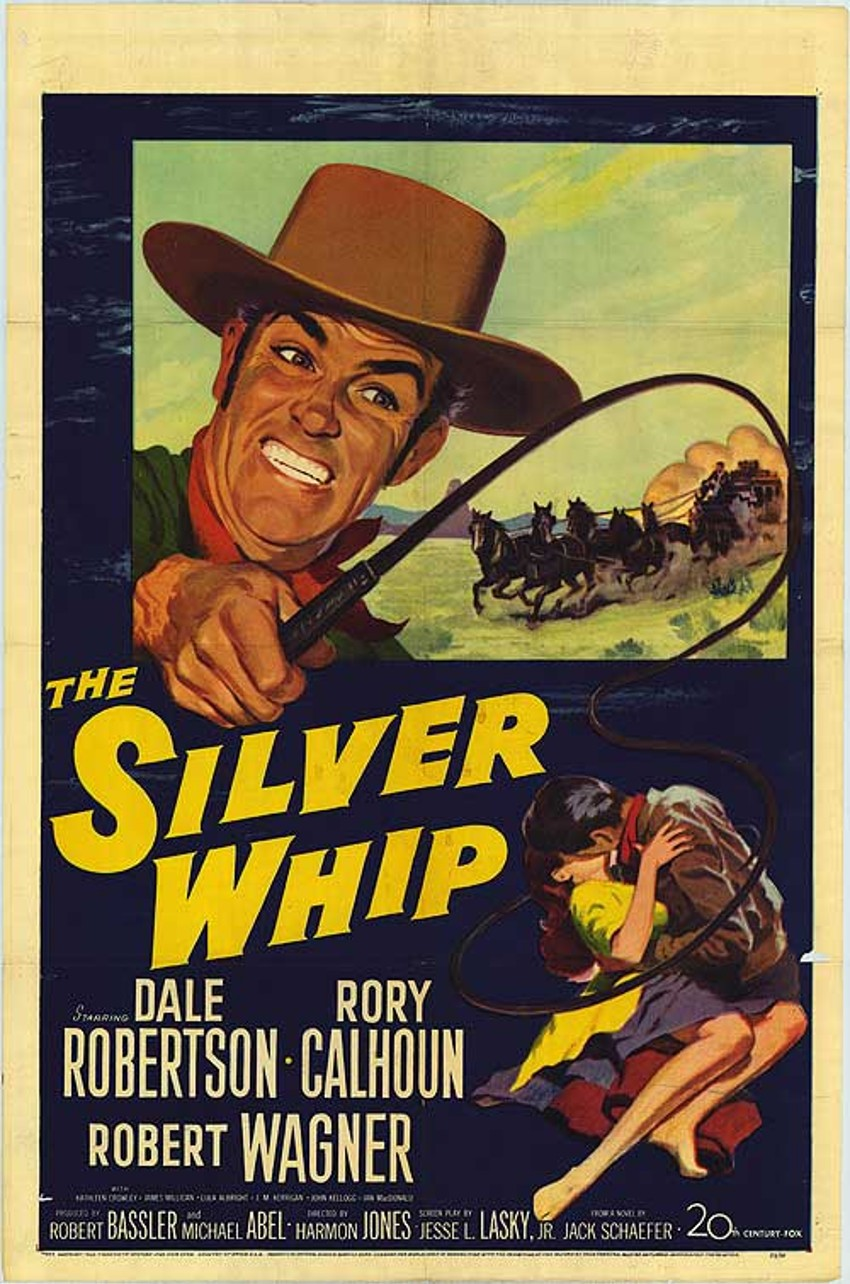
- Film poster
- Directed by: Harmon Jones
- Screenplay by: Jesse L. Lasky Jr.
- Based on: Jack Schaefer (from a novel by)
- Produced by: Michael Abel; Robert Bassler
- Starring: Dale Robertson; Rory Calhoun; Robert Wagner
- Cinematography: Lloyd Ahern
- Edited by: George A. Gittens
- Color process: Black and white
- Production company: 20th Century-Fox
- Distributed by: 20th Century-Fox
- Release date: February 4, 1953 (Los Angeles)
- Running time: 73 minutes
- Country: United States
- Language: English
- Budget: $560,000.

The Silver Whip is a 1953 American Western film directed by Harmon Jones and starring Dale Robertson, Rory Calhoun and Robert Wagner.

== Plot ==
Cocky young drifter Jess Harker (Robert Wagner) wants to be a driver on the stagecoach's main line, just like Race Crim (Dale Robertson), his hero. The coach line's boss, Luke Bowen, doesn't believe Jess is ready yet.

Race goes to bat for Jess in getting a chance to guard the next stage leaving Red Rock, which will be carrying $27,000 in gold dust plus two passengers, including the woman Race loves, the beautiful saloon girl Waco (Lola Albright). For good luck, Race gives a gift to Jess, a silver-handled whip.

A gang of outlaws led by Slater ambushes the stage. Jess disobeys direct orders and the results are disastrous: Slater rides off with the money and both passengers are killed although Race would have certainly been killed had Jess followed Race's orders and driven the stage away to save the gold and passengers. Jess is ordered to return home by an angry Bowen, but he joins the posse led by Sheriff Tom Davisson (Rory Calhoun) and is eventually deputized instead.

Race is out to avenge Waco in his own way. He becomes a vigilante, killing two of Slater's men before Tom's posse can get to them. Tom wants the wanted men brought back alive to stand trial. He is able to apprehend Slater, returning him to Red Rock, where a lynch mob wants the outlaw hanged.

The circuit judge isn't in town so the sheriff walks across the street to send off a wire to get the judge to come in the morning, leaving Jess to guard the prisoner. Race personally leads the vigilantes, who attack the jail's door with axes. After repeated warnings which Race won't take seriously, Jess shoots him.

The mob disperses. By the time Tom is freed after being tied up by Race, Tom and three of his men make their way inside the jail and peace is restored. Jess is ready to ride again with Kathy (Kathleen Crowley) going with him while the sheriff is pleased that his friend Race is recovering from the gunshot wound to the chest.

== Cast ==
- Dale Robertson as Race Crim
- Rory Calhoun as Sheriff Tom Davisson
- Robert Wagner as Jess Harker
- Kathleen Crowley as Kathy Riley
- James Millican as Luke Bowen
- Lola Albright as Waco
- J.M. Kerrigan Riley
- John Kellogg as Slater
- Ian MacDonald as Hank
- John Doucette as Josh, townsman that incites a lynch mob

== Production ==
The film was based on the novel First Blood by Jack Schaefer, originally called Solstice (Schaefer wrote First Blood right after Shane).

The film was announced in August 1952 as Stage to Silver City with Wagner, Robertson and Calhoun attached and Jesse L. Lasky Jr. writing the script. In September the title was The Silver Whip.

Filming took place in October 1952.

== Home media ==
The Silver Whip has been released as a DVD in the United States.
