= Story-Press Corporation =

American publishers

- Type: Private
- Industry: Publishing
- Founded: 1903
- Founders: Stumer, Rosenthal and Eckstein (Louis M. Stumer, Benjamin J. Rosenthal, Louis Eckstein)
- Defunct: 1929
- Fate: Reorganized as Consolidated Magazines Corporation; flagship titles acquired by McCall Company
- Headquarters: Chicago, Illinois, U.S.
- Key people: Trumbull White, Karl Edwin Harriman, Ray Long
- Products: The Red Book Magazine, The Blue Book Magazine, The Green Book Magazine

The Story-Press Corporation (later reorganized as the Consolidated Magazines Corporation) was an American magazine publishing house based in Chicago, Illinois, active during the early 20th century. Founded by Chicago retail merchants Louis M. Stumer, Benjamin J. Rosenthal, and Louis Eckstein, the company launched several prominent American fiction and general-interest periodicals, most notably The Red Book Magazine, The Blue Book Magazine, and The Green Book Magazine.

== History ==
=== Origins and founding ===
Prior to establishing Story-Press, the founders briefly financed 10 Story Book via the Daily Story Publishing Company. After buying out their stake, they launched The Red Book Illustrated in May 1903 under Story-Press, quickly growing circulation past 300,000 under editor Trumbull White.

=== Expansion and color-themed titles ===
Story-Press expanded its lineup with companion periodicals:

- The Blue Book Magazine: Launched in May 1905 as The Monthly Story Magazine, it evolved into a leading pulp magazine.
- The Green Book Magazine: Launched in January 1909, focusing initially on theater before shifting to general fiction and women's interest until ceasing publication in 1921.

Key editors included Karl Edwin Harriman (1906–1912) and Ray Long (1912–1918).

=== Reorganization and sale to McCall ===
Operating later as the Consolidated Magazines Corporation, the company sold its flagship titles The Red Book Magazine and The Blue Book Magazine to the McCall Company in 1929, ending its independent Chicago operations.

== Publications ==
- The Red Book Magazine (1903–1929)
- The Blue Book Magazine (1905–1929)
- The Green Book Magazine (1909–1921)
