= Kenneth Perkins =

Writer of Western, mystery, adventure and horror stories

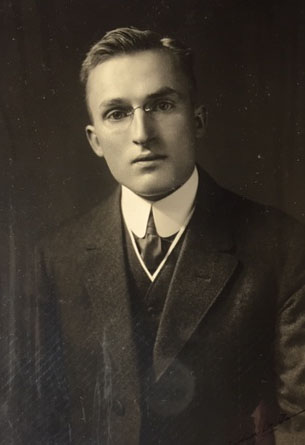
- Kenneth Taylor Perkins, circa 1915
- Born: Kenneth Taylor Perkins; May 16, 1890; Kodaikanal, India
- Died: June 7, 1951 (aged 61); Los Angeles, California, U.S.
- Education: University of California, Berkeley
- Occupations: Novelist, short story writer, playwright
- Spouse: Grace Adelaide Bemis (m. 1919)
- Children: Charlotte Joan Perkins
- Writing career
- Genres: Western, Mystery, Horror, Theatre

Kenneth Taylor Perkins (May 16, 1890 – June 7, 1951) was an American author of Western, mystery, adventure, and horror stories. From 1920 until his death in 1951, Perkins wrote plays, novels, radio and television scripts, and scores of short stories. In addition to publishing under his real name, Perkins used several pseudonyms, with stories appearing by Randolph Hale, King Phillips, Kim Knight, Charles Dustin, and J.O. Quinliven.

== Early years ==
Kenneth Taylor Perkins was born on May 16, 1890, in Kodaikanal, India in the south Indian state of Madras (now known as Tamil Nadu), where his parents were posted as missionaries with the Madura Mission, American Board of Commissioners for Foreign Missions. His father, James Coffin Perkins, graduated from the University of California with the Class of 1874; he then received his LL.B degree from Columbia University in 1876 and graduated from the Princeton Theological Seminary in 1885.

On June 28, 1885, James married Charlotte Jean Taylor in Baltimore, Maryland. They met when newly ordained James was brought in as a substitute pastor at Faith Presbyterian Church, where Charlotte attended. Shortly after the wedding, they sailed for India. Their first children, twin girls, died at childbirth on May 3, 1886. Kenneth's older brother, Donald, was born in 1888. A third son, Malcolm, died at 18 months in June 1895. Following a brief illness, Charlotte died from hepatitis on January 19, 1898, in Tirumangalam. Shortly thereafter, James' sister Mary R. Perkins sailed from San Francisco to India by herself to help him take care of the children.

James married his second wife, Lucy Elizabeth Croswell, on March 24, 1904 and they had one son, James Croswell Perkins (1905–1980).

Around the time of their father's remarriage, Kenneth and Donald, accompanied by their aunt, were sent to live in San Francisco, California, with their grandfather, Samuel Perkins, a wealthy shipping agent and "Argonaut," who arrived in San Francisco during the California Gold Rush on June 14, 1850, from Maine. Their grandmother, Sarah Coffin Perkins, had died three years earlier on September 3, 1901. Kenneth was living with his grandfather at the time of the 1906 earthquake. Their house survived the temblor but was then dynamited to make the Van Ness firebreak. Samuel Perkins died shortly afterwards in the refugee camp in Belvedere on July 10, 1906.

Kenneth's brother Donald Campbell Perkins died at age 24 on August 18, 1913, in the wreck of the S.S. State of California. He was the First Radio Operator and went down with his ship when the steamer, running at full speed, struck an uncharted rock in Gambier Bay, ninety miles south of Juneau, Alaska. When the vessel began to sink, he relieved his subordinate in order to send the SOS signal himself. Within the three minutes that it took for the ship to go down, Perkins got out his call for help several times. Out of 179 lives aboard, only 31 were lost. For his bravery and quick action, Donald C. Perkins' name is inscribed on the Wireless Operators Memorial in Battery Park, New York City.

After graduating from Lowell High School in San Francisco in 1909, Kenneth Perkins spent some time as a steward on a Pacific steamer before entering the University of California as a member of the Class of 1914. As a student, Perkins was active in the English Club, where three plays that he wrote, "Beyond," "Blind Alleys," and "Bagdad," were produced and performed by the club. Another play, "A Full House," co-written with Norman Loyall McLaren and set in the "Nu Beta Sorority House" at Berkeley, was performed as part of the "Junior Farce and Curtain Raiser on Junior Day" in 1912. Through the club, Perkins met future writers Sidney Coe Howard and Frederick Schiller Faust. Howard would win the Pulitzer Prize for Drama in 1925 and a posthumous Academy Award in 1940 for his screenplay for Gone With the Wind, and Faust would go on to have a very successful career as the iconic Western writer Max Brand.

After graduation, Perkins stayed another year at Berkeley in order to earn a Master's degree in English in December 1915, with a thesis on symbolism in the works of Nathaniel Hawthorne. With degree in hand, he went to work in 1916 at Pomona College in Claremont, California, as an Assistant Instructor in English and Dramatics. He was hired along with Reginald Pole, a highly regarded English Shakespearean actor (and the father of Rupert Pole), who was put in charge of the college's dramatics program with Perkins as his assistant. The American entry into World War I interrupted his academic career and Perkins enlisted in the United States Army in 1917 and served as a 2nd lieutenant in the field artillery. After the war, in summer 1919, Perkins taught a pair of courses (elementary and advanced) on the "motion picture scenario" for UC Extension in San Francisco.

== Career ==
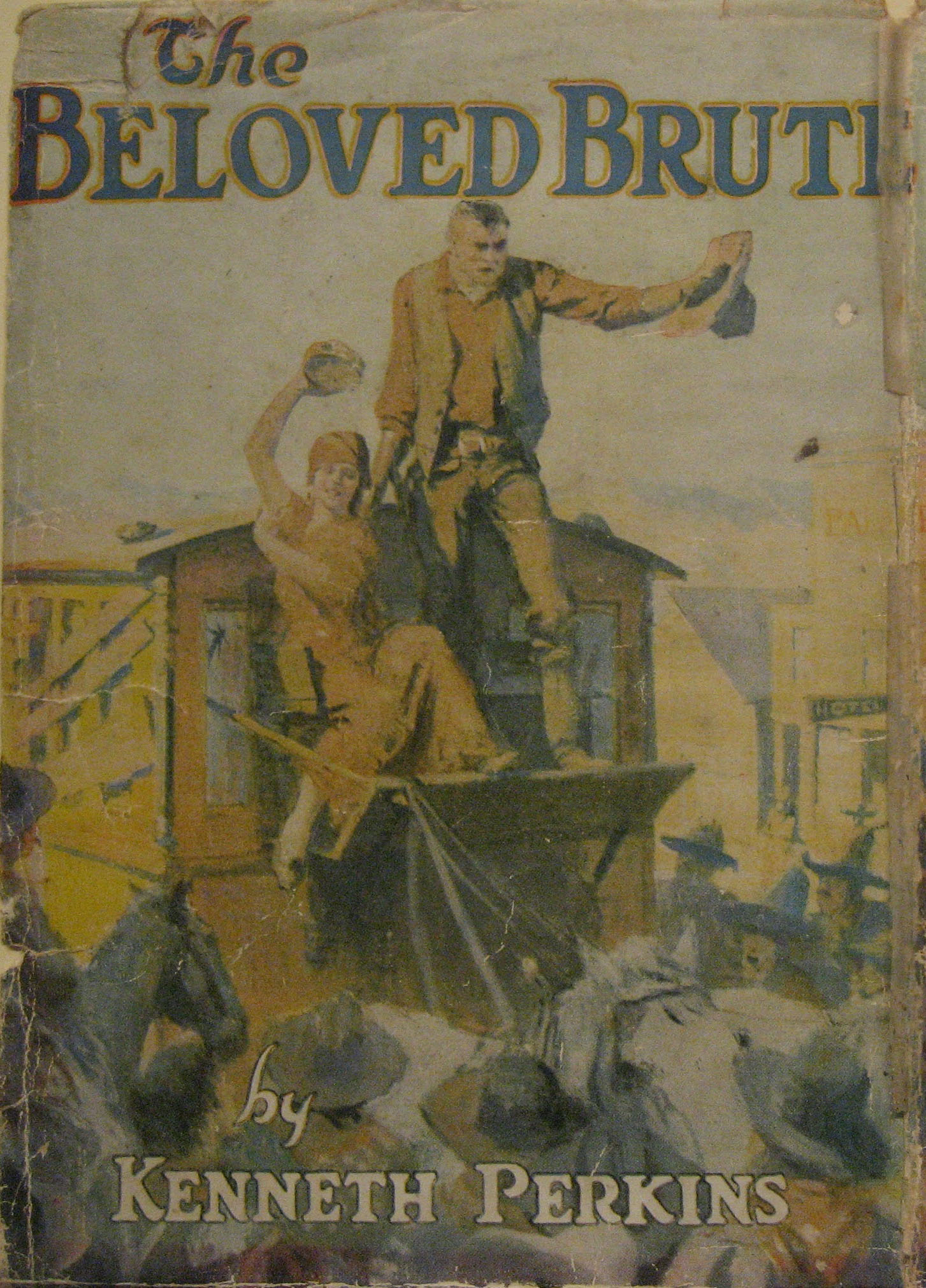
The Beloved Brute, 1923

Kenneth Perkins moved to New York in 1919 and rekindled his friendship with his old college pal, Frederick Schiller Faust, where they spent hours together talking about plots. Perkins aspired to become a writer and had a stack of unsold stories. Faust went over them, word by word, and encouraged him to stick with writing. His first story, "Gotham's Wife," which Faust had meticulously edited (as Perkins later recalled, "Heinie had gone over it, corrected it, twisted it, and cut out all the 'literary' touches") appeared in the July 31, 1920, issue of Argosy All-Story Weekly. After Faust gave him a copy of his first Max Brand novel, The Untamed (1919), Perkins was inspired to try his own hand at Westerns. Faust championed Perkins to his editor at Munsey's, Robert H. Davis, who bought Perkins' first Western. Perkins' career was launched. He spent the rest of his life as a full-time writer, often churning out stories at a breakneck pace. Multiple Perkins stories appeared every year in a variety of magazines. His last story, "Bronco Elephant," was published in Esquire in June 1951, the month of his death.

Although Perkins wrote stories in many genres, including mysteries and romantic adventure tales, he quickly realized that his particular talents lay with the Western story, particularly in tales of young cowboys and wild horses. From 1923 to 1942, he published thirty-four hardcover novels, under his own name and a variety of pseudonyms, all but five of which were Westerns.

For a few years in the mid-1930s, Perkins turned his hand to "weird tales," stories with elements of horror and the supernatural that were written specifically for the "shudder pulps," pulp magazines such as Horror Stories, Terror Tales, and Dime Mystery Magazine. For these he employed the pseudonym J.O. Quinliven, primarily to disguise the fact that he was writing these types of stories from his family.

Several of Perkins' stories and novels were adapted for stage and film. In 1923, a Tom Mix silent feature called Romance Land was adapted from Perkins' story, "The Gun-Fanner," which had appeared in four consecutive issues of Argosy All-Story Weekly in June–July 1922. His first hardcover novel, The Beloved Brute (1923) was adapted as a feature film the following year, and his second novel Ride Him, Cowboy (1923) was filmed twice. It first appeared as a silent feature in 1927 under the title The Unknown Cavalier, starring the popular trick rider and Western film star Ken Maynard. The second adaptation debuted in 1932 with a young John Wayne in the lead role. For the 1949 adventure film, Song of India, Perkins co-wrote the screenplay with Art Arthur. Other feature films adapted from Perkins' stories starred such Hollywood luminaries as Robert Young, Audie Murphy, Wayne Morris, Randolph Scott, Robert Ryan, and Barbara Stanwyck. Silent Western icons Maynard and Mix each starred in two films adapted from Perkins stories.

Perkins also had a brief flirtation with Broadway fame. His play Creoles, a comedy set in 1850 New Orleans, debuted in 1927 at the Klaw Theatre and ran for twenty-eight performances. A few years later another play, Dance With Your Gods, opened to less favorable reviews. However, this play is notable as the debut vehicle for actress Lena Horne. In 1947, Creoles was revived as a short-lived musical under the title Louisiana Lady.

Perkins found more success, albeit much of it posthumously, in contributing stories for radio and television scripts, including episodes of The Range Rider, The Gene Autry Show, Zane Grey Theatre, Maverick, Alfred Hitchcock Presents, and others.

== Pen names ==
With the exception of the Quinliven tales, the vast majority of Kenneth Perkins' short stories and scripts were published under his real name. However, when it came to his novels, he employed a variety of pseudonyms, with titles appearing as by King Phillips (four novels), Kim Knight (five novels), Charles Dustin (three novels), and Randolph Hale (two novels).

The Charles Dustin name is the subject of a bibliographical mystery. Normally reliable reference sources, such as Contemporary Authors, have attributed the name as a pseudonym of John Ulrich Giesy (1877–1947). Giesy was the author of humorous mysteries and science fiction stories in the Edgar Rice Burroughs vein. These sources claim that Giesy published western novels as Charles Dustin. However, it can be proven that the Dustin novels were written by Kenneth Perkins. A three-part story called "Broncho Men" appeared in consecutive issues of Street & Smith's Western Story Magazine in October 1934 under Kenneth Perkins' byline. The hardcover novel, Bronco Men, published in 1940 as by Charles Dustin, is clearly an adaptation of a serialized story (despite the slight difference in the spelling of the title). Both stories start with a young man named Lem Beavers (described as being 20 years old, with a face that is "raw-boned, homely, and happy") traveling with his wife in a covered wagon on the Oregon Trail. In both tales, Beavers' wife dies in childbirth on the trail, attended to by a veterinarian and an Indian woman, leaving young Lem with a baby daughter to raise on his own. Clearly, both stories were written by the same person. The British edition of Bronco Men identifies an earlier Dustin title, Hardboiled Tenderfoot, as being by the same author. And, although circumstantial, all three of the Dustin novels were published by Dodge Publishing Company, which published several other Perkins novels (under his own name and other pseudonyms).

== Personal life ==
On Christmas Day in 1919, Kenneth Perkins was married to Grace Adelaide Bemis, whom he had met when she was a student of his at Pomona College, in the French Chapel of the Cathedral of St. John the Divine in New York City. They had one daughter, Charlotte Joan, born in 1926 in New York, whom they named after his late mother, although she was known as Joan throughout her life.

== Death ==
Perkins died in Los Angeles, California, at the age of 61 on June 7, 1951, after a five-month stay at the Veterans Administration Hospital. Grace died exactly seventeen years later on June 7, 1968, at age 71. They are both buried at Rialto Park Cemetery in Rialto, California (San Bernardino County).

== Bibliography ==
=== Novels ===
Credited to Kenneth Perkins unless otherwise indicated.
Year	Title (Publisher)	Author Credit	Genre	Notes
1923	The Beloved Brute (New York: Macaulay Company)		Western	
1923	Ride Him, Cowboy (New York: Macaulay Company)		Western	
1924	The Gun Fanner (New York: Macaulay Company)		Western	
1925	Queen of the Night (Chicago: A.C. McClurg & Co.)		Mystery	
1926	Strange Treasure: A Western Story (London: Hutchinson & Co.)		Western	
1926	The Palm of the Hot Hand (Chicago: A.C. McClurg & Co.)	King Phillips	Western	
1927	Wild Paradise (Chicago: A.C. McClurg & Co.)	King Phillips	Western	Published in the U.K. (London: Hodder & Stoughton, 1928) as by Kenneth Perkins
1927	The Starlit Trail (Chicago: A.C. McClurg & Co.)	King Phillips	Western	Published in the U.K. (London: Wright & Brown, 1935) as by Kenneth Perkins
1928	The Mark of the Moccasin: (A Mystery Story) (London: Stanley Paul & Co.)		Mystery	Published in the U.S. as The Moccasin Murders (1931)
1928	The Discard (London: Stanley Paul & Co.)		Adventure	
1929	Gold (New York: Frederick A. Stokes Company)		Western/Historical	
1931	Voodoo'd (New York: Harper & Brothers)		Mystery	Published in the U.K. as The Horror of the Juvenal Manse (1931)
1931	The Horror of the Juvenal Manse (London: Hutchinson & Co.)		Mystery	Originally published in the U.S. as Voodoo'd (1931)
1931	The Moccasin Murders (New York: Alfred H. King, Inc.)		Mystery	Originally published in the U.K. as The Mark of the Moccasin (1928)
1932	The Cañon of Light (New York: Alfred H. King, Inc.)		Western	
1933	The Devil's Saddle (London: Stanley Paul & Co.)		Western	
1934	Fast Trailin' (London: Stanley Paul & Co.)		Western	
1934	Desert Voices (London: Wright & Brown)		Western	
1935	Gunwhipped (London: Wright & Brown)		Western	
1936	Sundown Café (London: Wright & Brown)		Western	
1936	The Gun Crusade (London: Wright & Brown)		Western	
1936	Buccaneer Blood (London: Stanley Paul & Co.)		Adventure	
1938	Big Pard (London: Wright & Brown)		Western	
1939	The Bulldogger (New York: Dodge Publishing Company)	Kim Knight	Western	
1939	Nighthawk's Gold (New York: Dodge Publishing Company)	Kim Knight	Western	
1939	Hardboiled Tenderfoot (New York: Dodge Publishing Company)	Charles Dustin	Western	
1939	Three Were Thoroughbreds (New York: Doubleday, Doran & Company)		Western	Reissued under title Relentless (1948)
1940	The Prodigal Bandit (New York: Dodge Publishing Company)	Randolph Hale	Western	
1940	Bronco Men (New York: Dodge Publishing Company)	Charles Dustin	Western	Story originally published under title "Broncho Men," as by Kenneth Perkins in Western Story Magazine in October 1934
1940	Feuder's Gold (New York: Dodge Publishing Company)	Kim Knight	Western	
1941	Dangerous Dust (New York: Dodge Publishing Company)	Kim Knight	Western	
1941	Gun King of Melted Rocks (New York: Dodge Publishing Company)	Randolph Hale	Western	
1941	Smoke on the Range (New York: Dodge Publishing Company)	King Phillips	Western	
1942	Vengeance Trail (New York: Dodge Publishing Company)	Kim Knight	Western	
1942	Riders of the Desert Trail (New York: Dodge Publishing Company)	Charles Dustin	Western	
1948	Relentless (New York: Bantam Books)		Western	Reissue of Three Were Thoroughbreds (1939)

=== Short stories ===
From 1920 until 1951, Kenneth Perkins published 238 short stories and serialized novels in a variety of magazines. Many of the pieces were published in the "pulps," magazines such as Argosy, Adventure, Short Stories, Western Story Magazine, Munsey's Magazine, and Blue Book. However, some of his stories also in "slicks," including Collier's, The Saturday Evening Post, and Liberty. His final story, published just a month before his death, appeared in Esquire. The vast majority of Perkins' magazine work appeared under his own name. He wrote 17 stories for the "shudder pulps" under the pseudonym J.O. Quinliven, and one Western serial, "Loretta Brodell," appeared in the pages of Argosy All-Story Weekly in 1925 under the pseudonym Kim Night, a name Perkins would later adapt as Kim Knight for five novels.

=== Plays ===
- The Far-Away Night: A Play in One Act. Kitchener Press, 1913
- Creoles (1927) Klaw Theatre, September 22, 1927 - October 16, 1927
- Desire (1930) Garrick Theatre, Philadelphia
- Dance With Your Gods (1934) Mansfield Theatre, October 6–13, 1934
- Louisiana Lady (1947) New Century Theatre, June 2–4, 1947

== Filmography ==
=== Films ===
Year	Film	Cast & Crew	Notes
1923	Romance Land	Starring: Tom Mix, Barbara Bedford. Director: Edward Sedgwick	Based on the story "The Gun-Fanner" (Argosy, June 10-July 1, 1922)
1924	The Beloved Brute	Starring: Marguerite De La Motte, Victor McLaglen. Director: J. Stuart Blackton	Based on the novel The Beloved Brute (1923)
1926	The Unknown Cavalier	Starring: Ken Maynard, Kathleen Collins. Director: Albert S. Rogell	Based on the novel Ride Him, Cowboy (1923)
1926	The Canyon of Light	Starring: Tom Mix, Dorothy Dwan. Director: Benjamin Stoloff	Based on the story "The Cañon of Light" (Argosy, March 6-April 3, 1926)
1927	The Devil's Saddle	Starring: Ken Maynard, Kathleen Collins. Director: Albert S. Rogell	Based on the story "The Devil's Saddle" (Argosy, October 30-December 4, 1926)
1932	Ride Him, Cowboy	Starring: John Wayne. Director: Fred Allen	Based on the novel Ride Him, Cowboy (1923)
1948	Relentless	Starring: Robert Young, Marguerite Chapman. Director: George Sherman	Based on the novel Three Were Thoroughbreds (1939)
1949	Song of India	Starring: Sabu, Gail Russell. Director: Albert S. Rogell	Based on an original screenplay by Art Arthur and Kenneth Perkins, story by Jerome Odlum
1952	Desert Pursuit	Starring: Wayne Morris, Virginia Grey. Director: George Blair	Based on the story "Starlight Canyon" (published as "Horse Thieves' Hosanna," Blue Book, December 1948)
1953	Tumbleweed	Starring: Audie Murphy, Lori Nelson, Chill Wills. Director: Nathan Juran	Based on the story "Three Were Renegades" (Blue Book, December 1938)
1954	Riding Shotgun	Starring: Randolph Scott, Wayne Morris, Joan Weldon. Director: Andre de Toth	Based on the story "Riding Solo" (Blue Book, September 1942)
1955	Escape to Burma	Starring: Barbara Stanwyck, Robert Ryan. Director: Allan Dwan	Based on the story "Bow Tamely to Me" (Collier's, October 31, 1936; Pearson's Magazine, June 1938)

=== Television ===
Year	TV Series	Episode	Credit
1950	The Gene Autry Show	S1 Ep15 (October 29, 1950): "Gun Powder Range"	Screenplay
1950	The Gene Autry Show	S1 Ep21 (December 10, 1950): "The Killer Horse"	Writer
1951	The Range Rider	S1 Ep2 (1951): "The Secret Lode"	Writer
1951	The Range Rider	S1 Ep24 (1951): "False Trail"	Screenplay
1954	Schlitz Playhouse of Stars	S3 Ep50 (August 13, 1954): "Gift of the Devil"	Original story
1956	The Star and the Story	S2 Ep21 (March 31, 1956): "The Whizzer"	Story
1957	Zane Grey Theatre	S2 Ep5 (November 2, 1957): "Ride a Lonely Trail"	Television story
1957	Maverick	S1 Ep7 (November 3, 1957): "Relic of Fort Tejon"	Magazine story
1957	Fireside Theatre	S3 Ep8 (November 28, 1957): "A Reasonable Doubt"	Story
1958	Sugarfoot	S1 Ep20 (June 10, 1958): "Mule Team"	Story
1959	Bronco	S1 Ep11 (February 10, 1959): "Riding Solo"	Story
1959	Lawman	S1 Ep29 (April 19, 1959): "Riding Shotgun"	Story
1959	Alfred Hitchcock Presents	S5 Ep4 (October 18, 1959): "Coyote Moon"	Story
1959	Bourbon Street Beat	S1 Ep7 (November 16, 1959): "Secret Of Hyacinth Bayou"	Story
1960	Colt .45	S3 Ep27 (June 14, 1960): "Showdown at Goldtown"	Story
