= Relentless (1948 film) =

1948 film by George Sherman

- Theatrical release poster
- Directed by: George Sherman
- Screenplay by: Winston Miller
- Based on: novel Three Were Thoroughbreds by Kenneth Perkins
- Produced by: Eugene B. Rodney
- Starring: Robert Young; Marguerite Chapman; Willard Parker; Barton MacLane
- Cinematography: Edward Cronjager
- Edited by: Gene Havlick
- Music by: Marlin Skiles
- Color process: Technicolor
- Production company: Cavalier Productions
- Distributed by: Columbia Pictures
- Release date: February 20, 1948
- Running time: 93 minutes
- Country: United States
- Language: English
- Box office: $1.6 million

Relentless is a 1948 American Western film directed by George Sherman and starring Robert Young and Marguerite Chapman in the main roles. The film was based on the story, "Three Were Thoroughbreds," by Kenneth Perkins, originally published in the June 1938 issue of Blue Book and then as a hardcover novel in 1939. IMDb and other sources mistakenly claim that the film was remade as the 1953 Audie Murphy film Tumbleweed, which was based on a similarly named story, "Three Were Renegades," by Perkins (originally published in the December 1938 issue of Blue Book). The later story, "Three Were Renegades," was published as a sort-of sequel to the earlier story, "Three Were Thoroughbreds," and the plotlines of the two films mirror the plotlines of their respective source stories.

== Plot ==
At the local saloon, prospectors Len Briggs and Bob Pliny brag about finding gold at their mine. Bad guys Tex Brandaw and Jim Rupple decide to follow the two prospectors and steal their mine. Drifter Nick Buckley, who is passing through town seeking shelter for his pregnant mare, is offered a drink by the two old prospectors, on the account of their recent good fortune. They also offer him the use of their shack for the night. However, Tex suggests to Nick the use of an empty stall in the town stable instead. The two prospectors return to their cabin where Tex and Jim await in ambush. They kill the prospectors and steal the map revealing the gold mine's location. They divide the map in two sections, to prevent cheating, and split up agreeing to meet later.

Tex has no intention of sharing the gold with Jim and bushwhacks him on the trail, taking Jim's half of the map. Jim pursues Tex on foot and runs into Nick, who left town after spending the night there. Nick's mare has just given birth on the trail and is in no shape to travel. but Jim seizes the mare at gunpoint and gallops after Tex. The sickly mare dies. An angry Nick catches up with Jim and kills him in a gunfight. Tex has witnessed the gunfight and, pretending he's a passerby, assures Nick that he will back up his story of self-defense in front of the sheriff. Tex even offers to take Jim's body back to town and inform the sheriff about the facts.

Nick leaves to aid his helpless foal, that he named Storm, back on the trail. Tex tells the sheriff that Nick killed Jim and the two prospectors, thus covering his own crimes and framing Nick for murder. The sheriff's posse goes after Nick, who is oblivious that he's a wanted man. On the trail, Nick runs into Luella Purdy, owner of a traveling general store, whom Nick had met in town the day before. She agrees to help Nick care for his starving foal and they buy a burro, a jenny whose own foal has been sold, from an old prospector in order to nurse Storm. Luella believes Nick's story of self-defense concerning the showdown with Jim. Sheriff Jeff Moyer shows up and charges Nick with the murders. Nick escapes and goes after Tex on his own to clear his name.

After searching for over a month he encounters Luella again. He visits Storm and tells Luella he couldn't find Tex. The posse, who is trailing Nick, arrives and Nick is wounded and hides in the brush. The sheriff orders the men to pour kerosene to burn Nick out. Nick crawls to some rocks which shield him from the fire and allow him to escape, with the posse in pursuit. Nick hides in some rocks and escapes the posse.

He arrives in a town and collapses in the saloon from his wound. The doctor says the bullet nicked his arm but he's lost a lot of blood. The saloon owner, Faringo, thinks there may be a reward for his capture, since he was probably running from the law. The posse arrives in town. The saloon owner knows who Nick is, and tells him he wants a share in the mine, thinking Nick killed the two prospectors. The doctor turns him in to the sheriff for the $400 reward but the saloon owner and his offsider Jake hide him.

Nick plays along, telling them he has the map in his head. He is threatened by Faringo and agrees to draw the map. Nick is held captive by Jake while Faringo goes to find the mine. Nick uses broken glass to cut his ropes. Faringo takes the map to the assay office and discovers he's been tricked. Luella hears a conversation of the doctor telling someone how he treated Nick and where Faringo hid him. She arrives with her wagon and helps Nick escape. Nick tells her he must find Tex. Luella tells Nick she renamed the horse Breeze.

He finds his trail and takes the burro plus a gun and heads out over the mountain to meet up with Tex. Faringo and Jake watch him, and then follow him, thinking he is headed for the mine.

Meanwhile, Breeze chews through the rope attached to Luella's wagon and follows Nick and the burro. Nick discovers the burro was shot during his rescue. He removes the bullet.

The sheriff meets up with Luella and she agrees to show him Nick's trail if she can come along. He agrees.

Breeze finally meets up with Nick and goes to the burro. Nick takes Breeze and continues on. He meets up with Tex, who is loading gold onto his horses. Nick shoots the water barrels, then taunts Tex, who is exposed to the hot sun, with the water he has. Tex offers to share the gold in exchange for his getting away. Nick circles around and comes up behind Tex, forcing him to drop his gun. Tex confesses he killed the prospectors, plus his partner. Faringo shoots Tex and plans to kill Nick. The sheriff arrives with Luella. Tex confesses to the sheriff before he dies, clearing Nick.

Nick and Luella plan their future since, as Luella says, "We've got too big a family to break up now", as the burro heals resting in the wagon and Breeze trails along behind.

== Cast ==
- Robert Young as Nick Buckley
- Marguerite Chapman as Luella Purdy
- Willard Parker as Sheriff Jeff Moyer
- Akim Tamiroff as Joe Faringo
- Barton MacLane as Tex Brandaw
- Mike Mazurki as Jake
- Robert Barrat as Ed Simpson
- Clem Bevans as Dad

== Release ==
The film was released in the United States on February 20, 1948, and in the United Kingdom on November 1, 1948.

=== Box Office ===
It grossed $1.6 million in North American rentals.
