= Ride Him, Cowboy =

1932 film

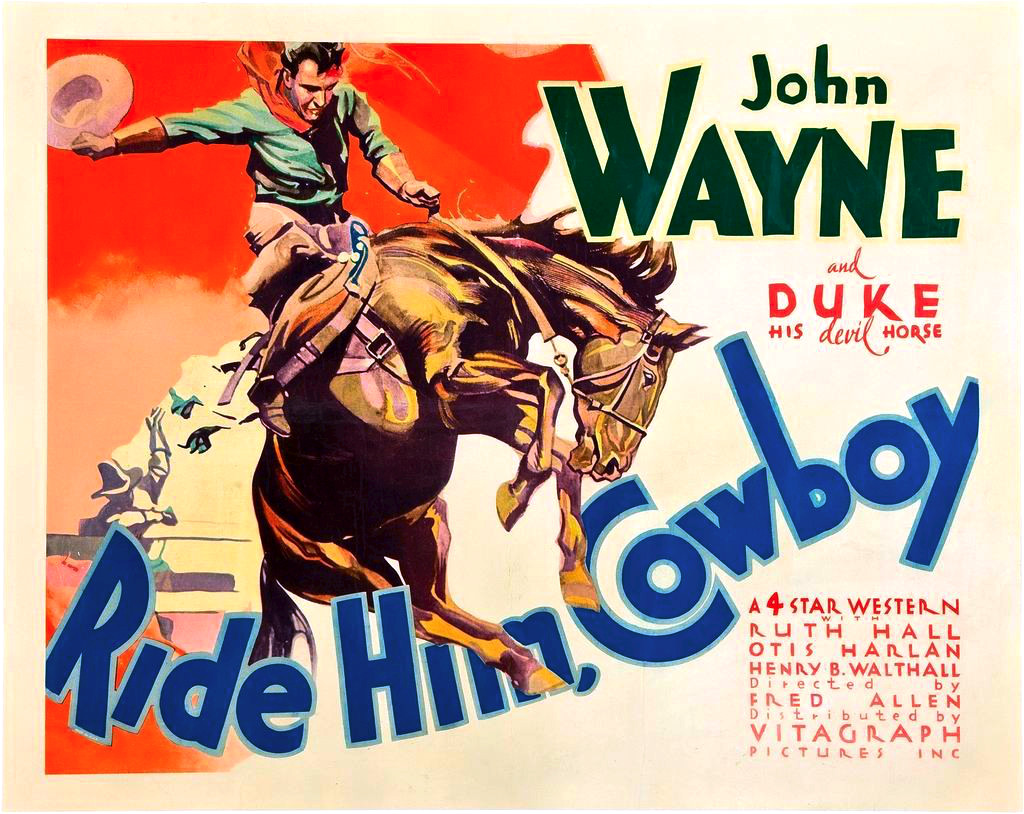
- Original poster
- Directed by: Fred Allen
- Written by: Kenneth Perkins (novel); Scott Mason
- Produced by: Leon Schlesinger
- Starring: John Wayne; Ruth Hall; Otis Harlan; Henry B. Walthall
- Cinematography: Ted D. McCord
- Edited by: William Clemens
- Production company: Leon Schlesinger Productions
- Distributed by: Warner Bros. Pictures
- Release date: August 27, 1932
- Running time: 55 minutes
- Country: United States
- Language: English
- Budget: $28,000
- Box office: $224,000

Ride Him, Cowboy is a 1932 pre-Code Western film directed by Fred Allen for Warner Bros. Pictures, starring a 25-year-old John Wayne. Based on the 1923 novel of the same name by Kenneth Perkins, the film is a remake of The Unknown Cavalier, a 1926 silent Western starring Ken Maynard, with much stock footage from the original. The film was released as The Hawk in the U.K. It was the first film to be produced by Leon Schlesinger Productions, which is better known for its animated short film series Looney Tunes and Merrie Melodies.

== Plot ==
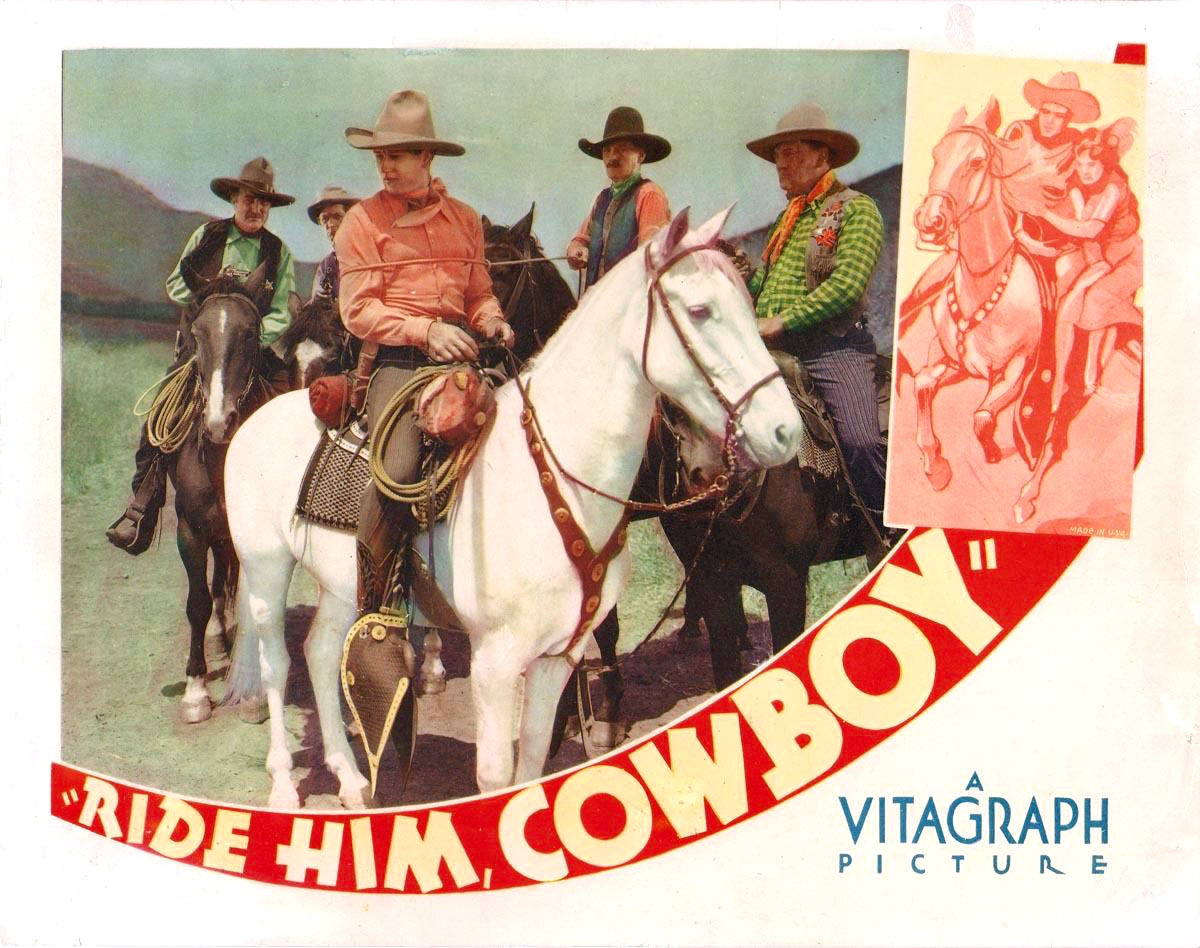
Lobby card

John Drury is passing through when townsfolk are about to kill Duke, a horse they believe to be dangerous. He convinces them to spare the animal if he can ride it. He does, earning the gratitude of Ruth Gaunt.

He then volunteers to deal with an outlaw known as the Hawk who has been terrorizing the area. Solid citizen Henry Simms volunteers to guide him to the Hawk's territory. But Simms is actually the Hawk and he ties Drury to a tree, leaving him to die. Simms then leads a raid on a ranch, kills a man, and plants Drury's harmonica at the scene. With the help of his horse Duke, Drury manages to free himself.

A group of vigilantes, believing that Drury is the Hawk, accuse him of murder and take him to face a hanging judge. Fortunately, Ruth shows up with the news that a wounded witness has regained consciousness and confirmed Drury's claim that Simms is the real bandit.

Simms's men burst in and hold everyone at gunpoint. Simms takes Ruth with him to his hideout, but Drury manages to escape and follow them. The posse overpowers Simms's henchmen and captures the rest of the gang. Simms and Drury fight; when Drury is distracted by the arrival of help, Simms knocks him out and tries to flee, only to run into the deadly hooves of an enraged Duke.

== Cast ==
- John Wayne as John Drury
- Ruth Hall as Ruth Gaunt
- Henry B. Walthall as John Gaunt
- Otis Harlan as Judge E. Clarence "Necktie" Jones
- Harry Gribbon as Deputy Sheriff Clout
- Frank Hagney as Henry Simms / The Hawk
- Murdock MacQuarrie as Doctor (uncredited)
- Glenn Strange as Henchman (uncredited)

== Box Office ==
According to Warner Bros records the film earned $164,000 domestically and $60,000 foreign.

== See also ==
- John Wayne filmography
