= Tumbleweed (film) =

1953 film by Nathan H. Juran

- Film poster by Reynold Brown
- Directed by: Nathan Juran
- Screenplay by: John Meredyth Lucas
- Based on: story "Three Were Renegades" by Kenneth Perkins
- Produced by: Ross Hunter
- Starring: Audie Murphy; Lori Nelson; Chill Wills
- Cinematography: Russell Metty
- Edited by: Virgil W. Vogel
- Color process: Technicolor
- Production company: Universal International Pictures
- Distributed by: Universal Pictures
- Release date: December 1953
- Running time: 79 minutes
- Country: United States
- Language: English

Tumbleweed is a 1953 American Western film directed by Nathan Juran and starring Audie Murphy, Lori Nelson, and Chill Wills. The film is based on the story "Three Were Renegades" by Kenneth Perkins, originally published in the December 1938 issue of Blue Book. IMDb and other sources mistakenly call the film a remake of the 1948 film Relentless, which was based on a similarly named story, "Three Were Thoroughbreds," by Perkins (originally published in the June 1938 issue of Blue Book; published as a hardcover novel in 1939). The later story, "Three Were Renegades," was published as a sort-of sequel to the earlier story, "Three Were Thoroughbreds," and the plotlines of the two films mirror the plotlines of their respective source stories.

== Plot ==
Jim Harvey (Audie Murphy) is a guide and guard on a wagon train. After he saves the life of a Yaqui Indian warrior named Tigre, the wagon train is attacked. Harvey realizes their only chance of survival is if he can negotiate a truce with Tigre's father, Chief Aguila (Ralph Moody). Aguila orders Harvey to be knocked out, and tortured later, but he is set free by Tigre's mother. He goes to town and discovers the people on the wagon train were massacred, except for two sisters who Harvey insisted hide in the caves. Harvey is falsely accused of cowardice, and the townsfolk threaten to lynch him. Harvey escapes on a Cayuse horse named Tumbleweed that he borrows from Nick Buckley (Roy Roberts), and tries to prove his innocence. He eventually discovers that a white man had engineered the attack and is exonerated. The titular horse's intelligence, sure-footedness, and instinct save Harvey, and his interaction with the horse drives much of the storyline.

== Cast ==
- Audie Murphy as Jim Harvey
- Lori Nelson as Laura
- Chill Wills as Sheriff Murchoree
- Roy Roberts as Nick Buckley
- Russell Johnson as Lam Blandon
- K. T. Stevens as Louella Buckley
- Madge Meredith as Sarah Blandon
- Lee Van Cleef as Marv
- I. Stanford Jolley as Ted
- Ralph Moody as Aguila
- Ross Elliott as Seth Blandon
- Eugene Iglesias as Tigre
- Phil Chambers as Trapper Ross
- Lyle Talbot as Weber
- King Donovan as Wrangler
- Harry Harvey as Prospector

== See also ==
- List of films about horses
- List of American films of 1953
