= Riding Shotgun (film) =

1954 film by André de Toth

- Theatrical release poster
- Directed by: Andre de Toth
- Written by: Thomas W. Blackburn
- Based on: story "Riding Solo" by Kenneth Perkins
- Produced by: Ted Sherdeman
- Starring: Randolph Scott; Wayne Morris; Joan Weldon
- Cinematography: Bert Glennon
- Edited by: Rudi Fehr
- Music by: David Buttolph
- Production company: Warner Bros. Pictures
- Distributed by: Warner Bros. Pictures
- Release date: April 1, 1954
- Running time: 73 minutes
- Country: United States
- Language: English
- Box office: $1.4 million

Riding Shotgun is a 1954 American Western film directed by Andre de Toth and starring Randolph Scott, Wayne Morris and Joan Weldon. The film was based on the short story "Riding Solo" by Kenneth Perkins, originally published in the September 1942 issue of Blue Book. The production is unusual in that Scott narrates his inner thoughts at crucial moments in the action.

== Plot ==
For three years, Larry Delong has been hunting the outlaw Dan Marady, who killed his sister and nephew in a stagecoach holdup. He is now riding shotgun on a stage hoping for an encounter with Marady and a chance to kill him.

At a rest stop, Delong is lured away and ambushed by some of Marady's men. He learns that the gang intends to rob the 'Bank Club,' the casino in the town of Deepwater, and that they are about to hold up his stagecoach as a ruse to draw the sheriff and his men out of town.

Delong escapes, but too late to stop the stagecoach holdup, so he returns to Deepwater and discovers that nearly everyone believes he was involved in the holdup. His warnings of the casino robbery go unheeded.

Delong is forced to take refuge in a cantina. Demands that he be arrested escalate into talk of lynching. Only fear of Delong's well-known marksmanship keeps the angry townspeople at bay while the fair-minded deputy Tub Murphy struggles to maintain order. Delong sees the townspeople as innocent, though misguided, and wants to avoid gunplay for their sake.

Spotting one of Marady's men, Pinto, Delong realizes that the casino robbery is underway, and he escapes through an attic. He interrupts the robbery, and the fleeing gang members are easily caught by the townspeople because Delong has tampered with their saddlery. In the shootout, Marady makes a fatal error when he believes that Delong is out of bullets.

== Cast ==
- Randolph Scott as Larry Delong
- Wayne Morris as Deputy Sheriff Tub Murphy
- Joan Weldon as Orissa Flynn
- Joe Sawyer as Tom Biggert
- James Millican as Dan Marady
- Charles Buchinsky (aka Charles Bronson) as Pinto
- James Bell as Doc Winkler
- Fritz Feld as Fritz
- Vic Perrin as Bar-M Rider with Lynching Rope

== Other Adaptation ==
The same Kenneth Perkins short story was the basis of an episode of the television series Bronco, "Riding Solo," which first aired in 1959.
