= Desert Pursuit =

1952 film by George Blair

- Directed by: George Blair
- Written by: Scott Darling
- Based on: 1948 story "Horse Thieves' Hosanna" in Blue Book Magazine by Kenneth Perkins
- Produced by: Ace Herman; Wayne Morris; Lindsley Parsons
- Starring: Wayne Morris; Virginia Grey; George Tobias
- Cinematography: William A. Sickner
- Edited by: Ace Herman
- Music by: Edward J. Kay
- Production company: Lindsley Parsons Picture Corporation
- Distributed by: Monogram Pictures
- Release date: May 11, 1952
- Running time: 71 minutes
- Country: United States
- Language: English

Desert Pursuit is a 1952 American Western film directed by George Blair and starring Wayne Morris, Virginia Grey and George Tobias. The film is based on the story "Horse Thieves' Hosanna" by Kenneth Perkins, originally published in the December 1948 issue of Blue Book.

== Cast ==
- Wayne Morris as Ford Smith
- Virginia Grey as Mary Smith
- George Tobias as Ghazili
- Anthony Caruso as Hassan
- Emmett Lynn as Leatherface Bates
- John Doucette as Kafan
- Robert Bice as Tomaso
- Frank Lackteen as Ceremony Leader
- Artie Ortego as Indian
- Gloria Talbott as Indian Girl
- William Wilkerson as Indian Bodyguard
