= Aubrey Feist =

British writer

Aubrey Feist (26 December 1903 – 1976) was a British novelist. He is known for the publication, in the 1950s and in the 1960s, of adventure novels for young people.

== Works ==
=== Novels ===
- Key Men, 1937.
- The Eyes of St. Emlyn, 1938.
- High Barbary, 1950.
- Spread Eagle, 1952.
- The Dagger and the Rose, 1961.
- Boy's Choice - A New Book of Stories, 1968.
- The Field of Waterloo, 1969.
- The lion of St. Mark : Venice: the story of a city from Attila to Napoleon, 1970.
- Italian Lakes, 1975.

=== Short stories ===
- Devilstone, 1928 in Everybody’s Magazine.
- House of Fire, 1931 in Ghost Stories.
- The Golden Patio, 1932 in Strange Tales of Mystery and Terror.

=== Theater ===
- The Black Cabinet, 1947.
- Among Those Present, 1951.
- The Devil's Four Poster, 1953.
- Drums of deliverance, 1953.
- Crime at the Cedars, 1972.

=== Radio ===
- The Kingdom Of The Green, 1963.
- No Man's Land, 1964.
- Cavalcade To Cowdray, 1965.
- The Bells of Blandon, 1969.
- The Golden Salamander, 1970.
