= Frank Brownlee =

American actor

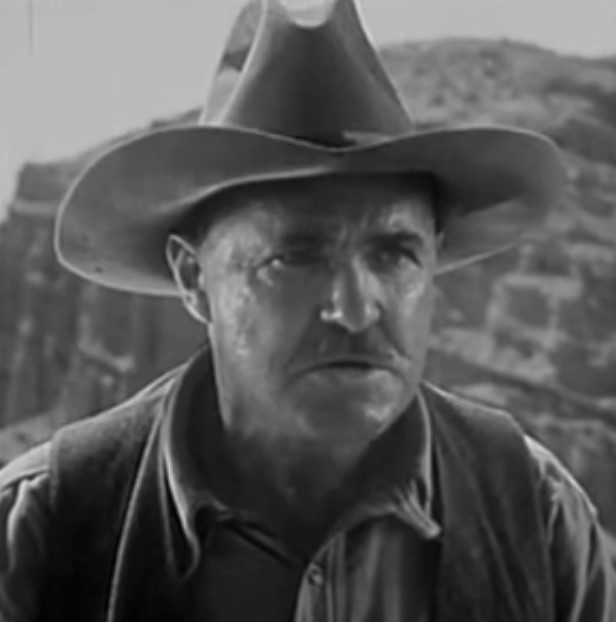
- Frank Brownlee in Tombstone Canyon (1932)
- Born: October 11, 1874; Dallas, Texas, United States
- Died: February 10, 1948 (aged 73); Los Angeles, California, United States
- Occupation: Actor
- Years active: 1911–1943

Frank Brownlee (October 11, 1874 – February 10, 1948) was an American film actor. He appeared in more than 110 films between 1911 and 1943. He was born in Dallas, Texas and died in Los Angeles, California.

== Selected filmography ==
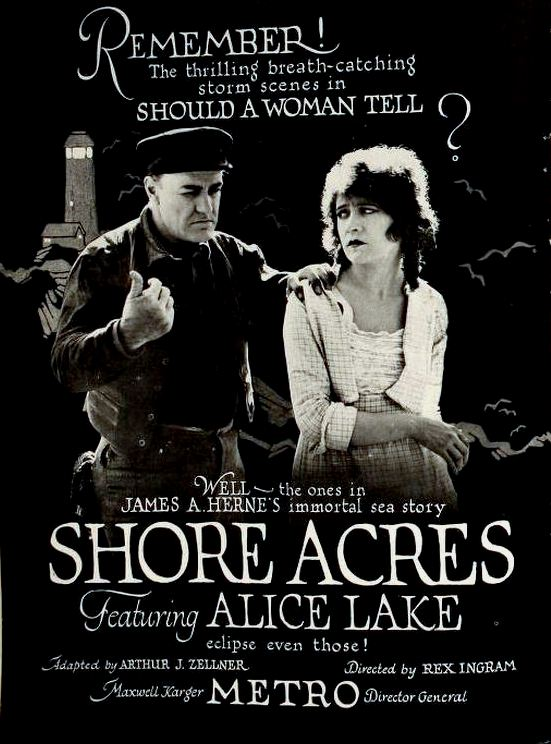
Brownlee and Alice Lake in ad for Shore Acres (1920)

- Sold for Marriage (1916)
- The Half-Breed (1916)
- The Mysterious Mrs. M (1917)
- The Double Standard (1917)
- The Little Pirate (1917)
- The Mysterious Mr. Tiller (1917)
- Mentioned in Confidence (1917)
- Wild Sumac (1917)
- Her Moment (1918)
- The Vanity Pool (1918)
- Danger, Go Slow (1918)
- The Lincoln Highwayman (1919)
- Brass Buttons (1919)
- The Return of Mary (1919)
- Desert Gold (1919)
- The Girl from Nowhere (1919)
- Hearts Are Trumps (1920)
- Shore Acres (1920)
- The Valley of Tomorrow (1920)
- His Own Law (1920) (actor and writer)
- Under Crimson Skies (1920)
- Riders of the Dawn (1920)
- The Whistle (1921)
- Love Never Dies (1921)
- The Hole in the Wall (1921)
- One Exciting Night (1922)
- The Face Between (1922)
- Fools of Fortune (1922)
- Romance Land (1923)
- Sawdust (1923)
- Nobody's Bride (1923)
- Boston Blackie (1923)
- The Beloved Brute (1924)
- The Great Jewel Robbery (1925)
- The Ridin' Streak (1925)
- Be Your Age (1926)
- King of the Pack (1926)
- The Social Highwayman (1926)
- With Love and Hisses (1927)
- Sailors, Beware! (1927)
- The Second Hundred Years (1927)
- Call of the Cuckoo (1927)
- Do Detectives Think? (1927)
- The Chaser (1928)
- Midnight Rose (1928)
- The Sawdust Paradise (1928)
- The Galloping Ghost (1931)
- The Lightning Warrior (1931)
- Pack Up Your Troubles (1932)
- Tombstone Canyon (1932)
- The Midnight Patrol (1933)
- Big Calibre (1935)
- Man's Best Friend (1935)
- Man from Cheyenne (1942)
- Gallant Lady (1942)
- Here Comes Kelly (1943)
