= The Beloved Brute =

1924 film

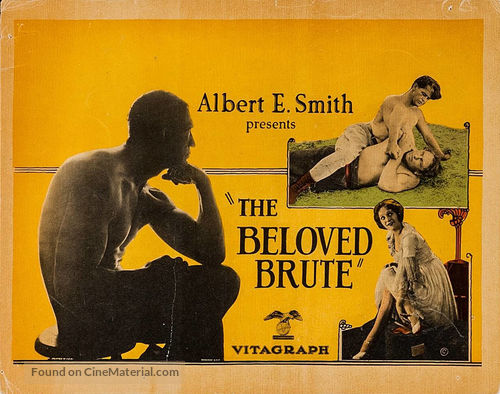
- Lobby card
- Directed by: J. Stuart Blackton
- Story by: Kenneth Perkins
- Based on: The Beloved Brute by Kenneth Perkins
- Produced by: J. Stuart Blackton; Albert E. Smith
- Starring: Marguerite De La Motte; Victor McLaglen; William Russell
- Cinematography: L. William O'Connell; Ernest F. Smith
- Production company: Vitagraph Studios
- Distributed by: Vitagraph Studios
- Release date: November 9, 1924
- Running time: 70 minutes
- Country: United States
- Languages: Silent; English intertitles

The Beloved Brute is a 1924 American silent Western film directed by J. Stuart Blackton and starring Marguerite De La Motte, Victor McLaglen, and William Russell. It is based on the 1923 novel The Beloved Brute by Kenneth Perkins. This was English-born McLaglen's first American film.

== Plot ==
As described in a review in a film magazine, some unaccountable force causes Charles Hinges to return to his father, who upbraids him for riotous living and brutality and tells him a man with a soul, his brother David, whom he has not seen since childhood, will prove his master. Charles, brooding, returns to a dance hall where China Jones, a half-breed, is keeping a dancer named Jacinta virtually a prisoner. She enlists Charles’ aid by playing up his strength and in a fierce fight with China’s aid he rescues her.

The two and an old fortune-teller start as a traveling troupe. In a small town, Charles is finally vanquished by his brother David in a wrestling match, and, believing he has lost Jacinta’s love, sends her away. David persuades her to go with him. China is killed, and, seeing a chance to get rid of David who is a reformer, the saloon keeper prepares to lynch him as the murderer.

Charles appears and tries to take the blame, so they decide to lynch them both. Jacinta rides and gets the sheriff’s posse after forcing the fortune-teller to confess, which saves the brothers. She rushes to David and he knows then that she loves him. David finally discloses his identity to Charles.

== Cast ==
- Marguerite De La Motte as Jacinta
- Victor McLaglen as Charles Hinges
- William Russell as David Hinges
- Stuart Holmes as China Jones
- Frank Brownlee as Phil Beason
- Wilfrid North as Fat Milligan
- Ernie Adams as Swink Tuckson
- D.D. McLean as Peter Hinges
- William F. Moran as Sheriff Swanson
- George Ingleton as Peg Reverly
- Jess Herring as Hump Domingo
- Mary Alden as Augustina

== Preservation ==
A print of The Beloved Brute is located at the EYE Film Institute Netherlands. The completeness of this copy is unclear.
