= The Whistle (film) =

1921 film

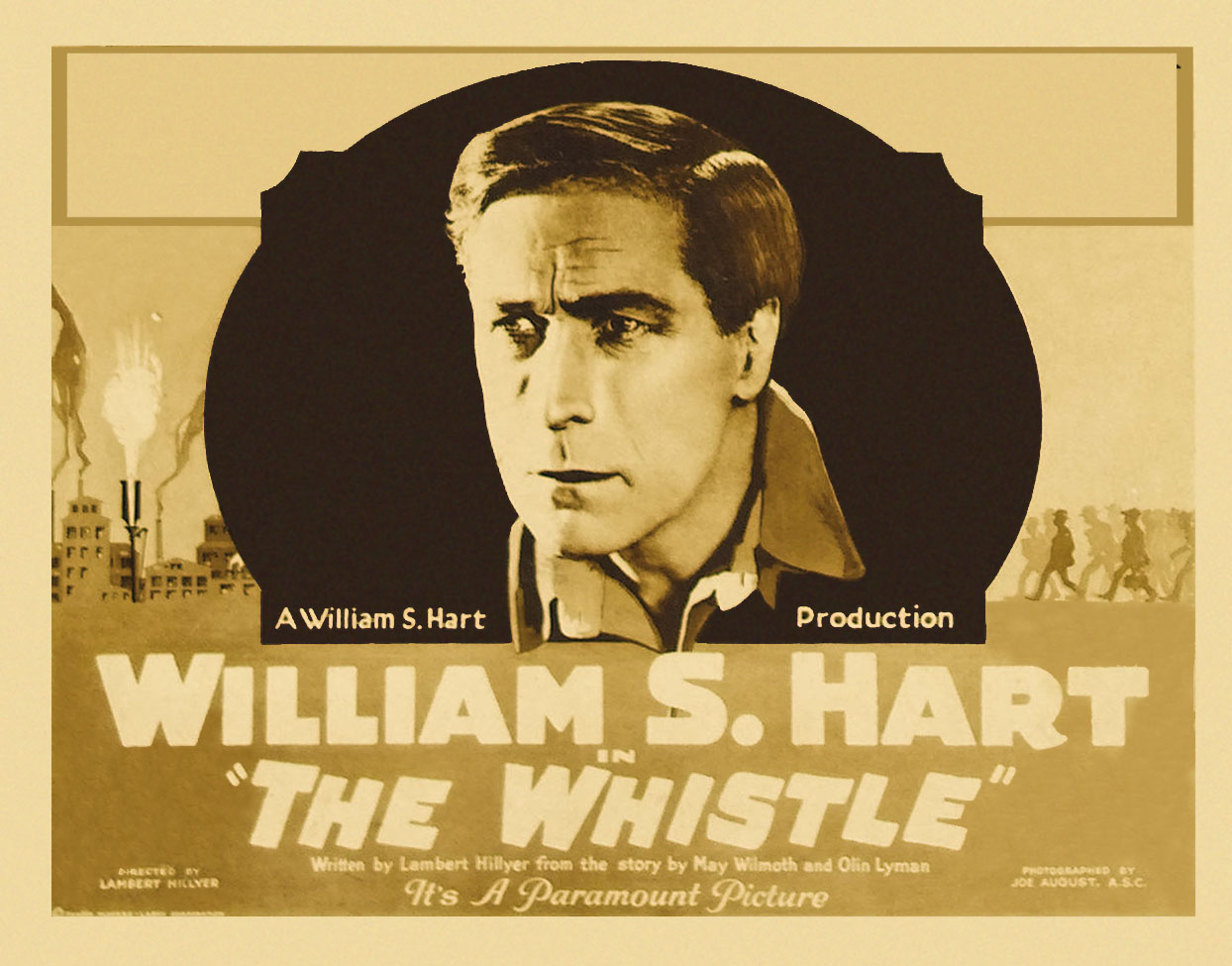
- Lobby card
- Directed by: Lambert Hillyer
- Screenplay by: May Wilmoth; Olin Lyman; Lambert Hillyer
- Produced by: William S. Hart
- Starring: William S. Hart; Frank Brownlee; Myrtle Stedman; Georgie Stone; Will Jim Hatton; Richard Headrick
- Cinematography: Joseph H. August
- Production company: William S. Hart Productions
- Distributed by: Paramount Pictures
- Release date: April 14, 1921
- Running time: 60 minutes
- Country: United States
- Language: Silent (English intertitles)

The Whistle

The Whistle is a 1921 American silent drama film directed by Lambert Hillyer and written by May Wilmoth, Olin Lyman and Lambert Hillyer. The film stars William S. Hart, Frank Brownlee, Myrtle Stedman, Georgie Stone, Will Jim Hatton, and Richard Headrick. The film was released in April 1921, by Paramount Pictures. A print of the film is in the Library of Congress.

== Plot ==
Robert Evans loses his son, Danny, due to dangerous working conditions. His employer, Henry Chapple, refuses to fix the problem. Evans takes revenge by kidnapping Chapple's son, Georgie, and raising him as he did his own. It's a life of labor, the opposite of the life which the Chapples would have given Georgie. Years later, Chapple meets Evans again while he is injured. He provides the best medical care he can for him, regardless of the cost. As Georgie spends more time with the Chapples, Mrs. Chapple grows very fond of him. The Chapples ask if they can adopt him. Evans is divided between his revenge against Mr. Chapple and the love which Mrs. Chapple has for her son. At the end, Evans realizes that by taking fate into his own hands, he has made himself more unhappy than anyone.

== Cast ==
- William S. Hart as Robert Evans
- Frank Brownlee as Henry Chapple
- Myrtle Stedman as Mrs. Chapple
- Georgie Stone as Georgie
- Will Jim Hatton as Danny Evans
- Richard Headrick as Baby Chapple

== Preservation status ==
- Prints held at the Library of Congress, BFI National Film and Television Archive, Academy Film Archive (Beverly Hills), George Eastman Museum Motion Picture Collection.
