= Nobody's Bride =

1923 film by Herbert Blaché

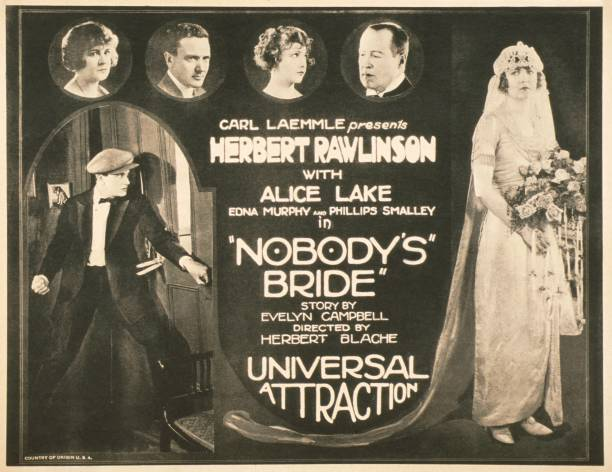
- Lobby card
- Directed by: Herbert Blaché
- Screenplay by: Albert Kenyon
- Story by: Evelyn Campbell
- Starring: Herbert Rawlinson; Edna Murphy; Alice Lake; Harry von Meter; Frank Brownlee; Sidney Bracey
- Cinematography: Virgil Miller
- Production company: Universal Pictures
- Distributed by: Universal Pictures
- Release date: April 2, 1923
- Running time: 50 minutes
- Country: United States
- Language: English

Nobody's Bride is a 1923 American crime film directed by Herbert Blaché and written by Albert Kenyon. The film stars Herbert Rawlinson, Edna Murphy, Alice Lake, Harry von Meter, Frank Brownlee and Sidney Bracey. The film was released on April 2, 1923, by Universal Pictures.

== Cast ==
- Herbert Rawlinson as Jimmy Nevins
- Edna Murphy as Doris Standish
- Alice Lake as Mary Butler
- Harry von Meter as Morgan
- Frank Brownlee as Vesher Charley
- Sidney Bracey as Smithy
- Phillips Smalley as Cyrus W. Hopkins
- Robert Dudley as Uncle Peter Standish
- Lillian Langdon as Mrs. Myrtle Standish
