= Be Your Age =

1926 film

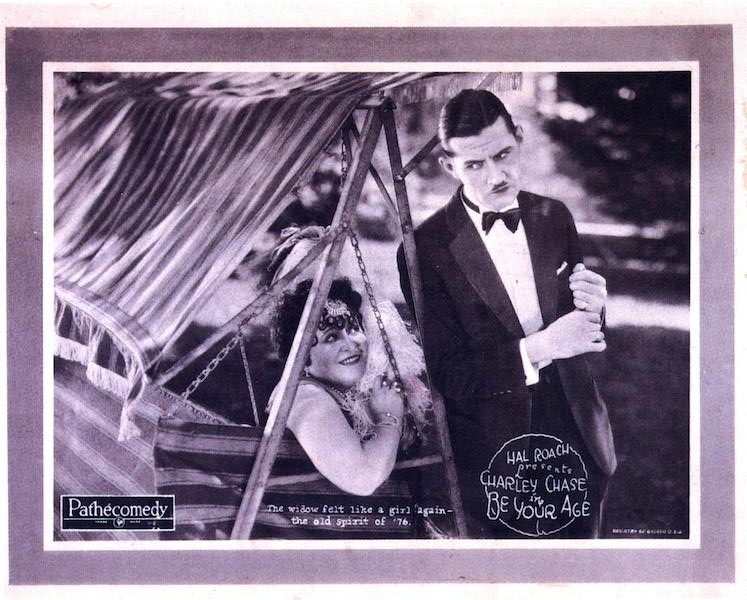
- Lobby card
- Directed by: Leo McCarey
- Written by: H. M. Walker
- Produced by: Hal Roach
- Starring: Oliver Hardy
- Cinematography: Len Powers
- Edited by: Richard C. Currier
- Distributed by: Pathé Exchange
- Release date: November 14, 1926
- Running time: 22 minutes
- Country: United States
- Language: Silent (English intertitles)

Be Your Age is a 1926 American silent comedy film directed by Leo McCarey, starring Charley Chase and featuring Oliver Hardy in the cast.

== Plot ==
A man desperately needs $10,000 to send to his family. There is a woman, a widow, who has just inherited two million dollars from her husband. She wants to remarry as soon as possible. The woman's lawyer, a conniving man, happens to have a solution for both of them.

== Cast ==
- Charley Chase as Charley, the Bashful Clerk
- Gladys Hulette as The Widow's Secretary
- Lillian Leighton as Mrs. Schwartzkopple
- Frank Brownlee as Mr. Blaylock
- Oliver Hardy as Oswald Schwartzkopple

== See also ==
- List of American films of 1926
