= The Stranger Wore a Gun =

1953 American 3D Western movie

- Theatrical release poster
- Directed by: Andre de Toth
- Screenplay by: Kenneth Gamet
- Based on: "Yankee Gold"; 1953 story by John W. Cunningham
- Produced by: Harry Joe Brown
- Starring: Randolph Scott; Claire Trevor; Joan Weldon; George Macready; Alfonso Bedoya
- Cinematography: Lester White
- Edited by: Gene Havlick; James Sweeney
- Color process: Technicolor
- Production company: Scott-Brown Productions
- Distributed by: Columbia Pictures
- Release date: July 30, 1953
- Running time: 83 minutes
- Country: United States
- Language: English

The Stranger Wore a Gun is a 1953 American Western film directed by Andre de Toth and starring Randolph Scott and Claire Trevor. Based on the short story "Yankee Gold" by John W. Cunningham, the film is about an ex-spy for Quantrill's Raiders and Confederate soldier who moves to Arizona to join a gold robbery but reconsiders and decides to change his life. The film is one of the first 3-D western movies; it earned an estimated $1.6 million at the North American box office in 1953. The supporting cast includes Joan Weldon, George Macready, Alfonso Bedoya, Lee Marvin, and Ernest Borgnine.The location shooting was done at Movie Flats off Route 395 near Lone Pine, California, with views of the snowy Sierra Nevada Crest in the background of some scenes.

== Plot ==
Jeff Travis, a spy for Quantrill's Raiders, leaves when he realizes Quantrill's true nature. He enlists in the Confederate Army as a legitimate soldier. After the war, he narrowly escapes a gang looking for former Quantrill's Raiders by jumping off a riverboat, thanks to his friend Josie's warning. At her urging, he rides to Prescott, Arizona, to start a new life.

Crooked saloon owner Jules Mouret hires Jeff to monitor a series of gold shipments on the local stage line run by Jason Conroy, his daughter Shelby, and Jake Hooper, in preparation for a major robbery. Aided by henchmen Dan Kurth and Bull Slager, Jules runs his competitor, the Mexican bandit Degas, out of town. There is a hint of a possible romance between Jeff and Shelby, but nothing materializes once Josie, a well-known saddletramp and gambler, arrives and sets up shop in Jules’ saloon.

After the stage driver Jake is gunned down in a stage robbery, Jeff turns honest again and vows to avenge him. While waiting to rob the stage, Jules and his gang encounter Degas and his gang. Jules shoots Degas and tries to rob the stage but is stopped when Jeff kicks Dan off and returns to town.

That night Jeff and Dan face off, but Jeff draws faster. The next morning in the saloon Jeff faces off with Jules and Bull in the saloon. Bull tries to sneak his gun out but Josie yells and throws a lamp setting the saloon on fire. Bull keeps trying to shoot Jeff, but Josie pulls his gun hand down, allowing Jeff to shoot him and Josie escapes. Jeff goes after Jules, but the fire is too much, trapping Jules. Jeff makes it out with only minor burns on his hands.

Later that day Jeff and Josie board the stage for California to begin a new life again. Shelby and her father bid them goodbye.

== Cast ==
- Randolph Scott as Jeff Travis aka Mark Stone
- Claire Trevor as Josie Sullivan
- Joan Weldon as Shelby Conroy
- George Macready as Jules Mourret
- Alfonso Bedoya as Degas
- Lee Marvin as Dan Kurth
- Ernest Borgnine as Bull Slager
- Pierre Watkin as Jason Conroy
- Joseph Vitale as Shorty
- Clem Bevans as Jim Martin
- James Millican as William Clarke Quantrill
