= The Mysterious Mr. Tiller =

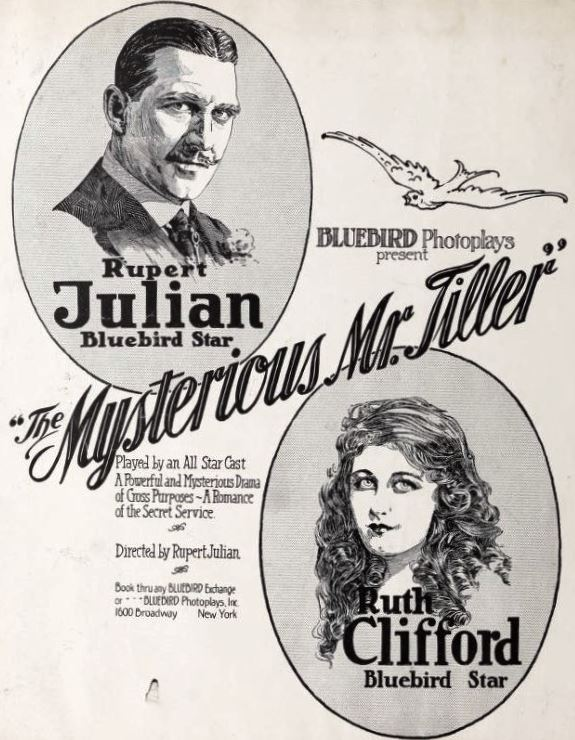
- Directed by: Rupert Julian
- Written by: Elliott J. Clawson
- Starring: Ruth Clifford; Rupert Julian; Frank Brownlee
- Cinematography: Stephen Rounds
- Production company: Universal Pictures
- Distributed by: Universal Pictures
- Release date: September 17, 1917
- Running time: 50 minutes
- Country: United States
- Languages: Silent; English intertitles

The Mysterious Mr. Tiller is a 1917 American silent mystery drama film directed by Rupert Julian and starring Ruth Clifford, Rupert Julian and Frank Brownlee.

== Cast ==
- Ruth Clifford as Clara Hawthorne
- Rupert Julian as Prentice Tiller
- Frank Brownlee as Ramon Mordant
- Wedgwood Nowell as Stephen Pitt
- Harry L. Rattenberry as O'Meara
- E. Alyn Warren as Rosario
- Lloyd Whitlock as Banning
- William Higby as Chief Detective

== Bibliography ==
- Robert B. Connelly. The Silents: Silent Feature Films, 1910-36, Volume 40, Issue 2. December Press, 1998.
