= The Command (1954 film) =

1954 film by David Butler

- Original film poster
- Directed by: David Butler
- Screenplay by: Samuel Fuller; Russell S. Hughes
- Based on: The White Invader; 1950 novel in The Saturday Evening Post by James Warner Bellah
- Produced by: David Weisbart
- Starring: Guy Madison; Joan Weldon; James Whitmore
- Cinematography: Wilfred M. Cline
- Edited by: Irene Morra
- Music by: Dimitri Tiomkin
- Production company: Warner Bros. Pictures
- Distributed by: Warner Bros. Pictures
- Release date: January 15, 1954 (Los Angeles/New York)
- Running time: 94 minutes
- Country: United States
- Language: English
- Box office: $2.5 million (US/Canada rentals)

The Command is a 1954 American CinemaScope Western film directed by David Butler. It stars Guy Madison and James Whitmore. It was based on the novel Rear Guard by James Warner Bellah and features a screenplay by Sam Fuller.

== Plot ==
When the commanding officer of a cavalry patrol is wounded and dying, he asks the patrol's surviving ranking officer, an army doctor, to take over and lead the patrol back to their fort. On the way back to their fort, the cavalry troop passes a town where two companies of infantry troops commanded by a colonel are temporarily taking a breather from their duty of escorting a wagon train of settlers. When the colonel learns of the presence of the cavalry troop, he orders the attachment of the cavalry troop to his command with the specific duty of screening the main body of infantry troops and the wagon train. This attachment results in the cavalry troop being involved in several encounters with the native Indians who keep attacking the wagon train. During the trip, the colonel suffers a mild stroke and is now unable to command. The infantry officers ask the cavalry officer to take over command from the incapacitated infantry colonel. The cavalry doctor-officer takes over and leads the combined troops of infantry and cavalry in defeating the Indians.

== Cast ==
- Guy Madison as Capt. Robert MacClaw
- Carl Benton Reid as Col. Janeway
- Joan Weldon as Martha Cutting
- Don Shelton as Maj. Gibbs
- Gregg Barton as Capt. Forsythe
- Robert Nichols as 2nd Lt. O'Hirons
- James Whitmore as 1st Sgt. Elliot
- Boyd 'Red' Morgan as Cpl. Fleming
- Harvey Lembeck as Pvt. Gottschalk

== Production ==
The film was originally due to star Gary Cooper under the title Rear Guard. The film was announced to be made in 3-D but Warner Bros. later announced that it was to be made in WarnerSuperScope using Warner's new All-Media camera with no mention of 3-D. Warner Bros. also announced a deal with Zeiss Opton to produce lenses for them but The Command was the only Warner Bros. film to use them.

Warner's camera and new system was never used and The Command was shot in Vistarama although, in agreement with 20th Century Fox, it was publicly released as Warner's first film in CinemaScope. It was also the first Western to be billed as in CinemaScope.
