= The Green Book Magazine =

American magazine

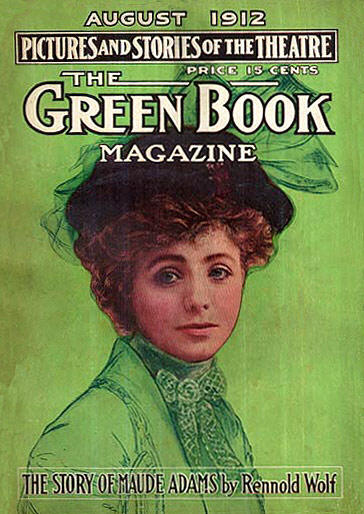
- Cover of the August 1912 issue
- Categories: Theater, women's interest
- Frequency: Monthly
- Founded: 1909
- First issue: January 1909; 117 years ago
- Final issue Number: July 1921; 105 years ago Vol 26, No 1
- Company: Story-Press Corporation
- Country: United States
- Based in: Chicago
- Language: English
- OCLC: 243889498

The Green Book Magazine, originally titled The Green Book Album, was a magazine published from 1909 to 1921. It was published by the Story-Press Corporation (later Consolidated Magazines) as a companion to its Red Book and Blue Book magazines. For most of its run, the magazine covered theater, but converted to a magazine for career women in its last few years, before ceasing publication in 1921.

During the time that The Green Book Magazine covered American theater the periodical contained novelizations of current plays, along with biographical articles.

== Editors and staff ==
From 1911 to the end of 1918 the magazine was edited by Ray Long, who also edited Red Book and Blue Book for Story-Press. Long left to become the editor of Cosmopolitan. Starting with the May, 1919 issue Karl Edwin Harriman became editor. Channing Pollock was the drama critic for the periodical. Note: The June 1916 edition Table of Contents page (available on the Internet Archive) is the first to show Ray Long as Editor. Similarly, the February 1919 edition Table of Contents page (also available on the Internet Archive) is the first to show Karl Edwin Harriman as Editor.

== Theater magazine ==
The original magazine title was The Green Book Album, with the subtitle of "The Magazine of the Passing Show", and contained a section of photographs. The July 1909 issue had a 28 page album of photographs showing theater entertainers.

The early issues also published novelizations of recent plays, biographies and essays. In 1914 Billie Burke wrote an article about "How the Red-Headed Woman Should Dress" and in 1915 a newspaper reported that Green Book published an article on the method Irving Berlin used to write songs.

=== Fiction ===
By 1915 nearly half of the periodical’s content consisted of short stories or serialized novels. A 1918 issue of Motion Picture News states that Zane Grey’s Riders of the Purple Sage and The Rainbow Trail were serialized in the magazine before being published as books. In 1921 Dorothy Parker's story "The Rivals" appeared in the magazine.

The 1921 film Midsummer Madness was based on the serialized story "His Friend and His Wife" and the 1920 Sessue Hayakawa film Li Ting Lang plot was based on Howard P. Rockey's 1916 story "Li Ting Lang, Chinese Gentleman."

== Women's magazine ==
When motion pictures became more popular than live theater, sales of The Green Book issues dropped drastically, so it was changed to a magazine aimed at "career girls". Starting with the May 1919 issue, Karl Edwin Harriman became editor. He wrote an editorial stating they would be offering more short stories, but assured readers that Channing Pollock would continue his column reviewing plays. That issue had nine short stories and two theater articles. By the January 1920 issue, the magazine had the subtitle "Of Interest to All Woman" and contained articles and fiction, but nothing pertaining to theater. The magazine ceased publication in 1921.
