= Escape to Burma =

1955 film by Allan Dwan

- Directed by: Allan Dwan
- Written by: Talbot Jennings; Hobart Donovan
- Based on: story "Bow Tamely to Me" by Kenneth Perkins
- Produced by: Benedict Bogeaus
- Starring: Barbara Stanwyck; Robert Ryan; David Farrar; Murvyn Vye; Lisa Montell; Robert Warwick; Reginald Denny
- Cinematography: John Alton
- Edited by: James Leicester
- Music by: Louis Forbes
- Production company: Filmcrest Productions
- Distributed by: RKO Radio Pictures
- Release date: April 9, 1955 (US)
- Running time: 87 minutes
- Country: United States
- Language: English

Escape to Burma is a 1955 American Technicolor adventure film directed by Allan Dwan starring Barbara Stanwyck, Robert Ryan and David Farrar. The film was based on the short story "Bow Tamely to Me" by Kenneth Perkins, originally published in the October 31, 1936 issue of Collier's (reprinted in the June 1938 issue of Pearson's Magazine).

== Plot ==
In the 1920s, British Burma, the son of a local ruler, the Sawbwa, was killed - apparently by his European mining partner, Jim Brecan. The Sawbwa wants Brecan caught and executed, while Captain Cardigan wants him caught for trial. Brecan flees through the jungle with a bag of rubies from the mine and reaches the estate of Gwen Moore, who uses elephants to harvest teak. Brecan arrives there calling himself "Jim Martin". He and Gwen are attracted to each other. After he helps her deal with some problems, including a killer tiger, she makes him her manager.

Cardigan arrives at the estate, and Brecan flees when he realizes who Cardigan is. Gwen follows them, preventing Brecan from killing Cardigan, which allows Cardigan to capture Brecan. He starts to take them back to Rangoon. However, when they stop for the night, they are attacked by Kaw bandits, which allows Brecan to escape. Weather soon forces all three to spend another night together in an abandoned Buddhist temple. Brecan and Gwen return to her estate, where the local police attack. After Gwen is wounded, Brecan surrenders. He is taken to Rangoon for punishment.

A boy who was the dead prince's servant shows up with a letter from the prince to the Sawbwa. The Sawbwa condemns Brecan to death; he is taken out for a pre-execution flogging. Gwen and Cardigan arrive, and she convinces the Sawbwa to read the letter. The prince had the plague and, in his delirium, was about to expose a village to the disease, forcing Brecan to shoot him. The Sawbwa releases him. Brecan gives all the rubies to the Sawbwa, and it appears Brecan and Gwen will live happily ever after.

== Cast ==
- Barbara Stanwyck as Gwen Moore
- Robert Ryan as Jim Brecan/Martin
- David Farrar as Cardigan
- Reginald Denny as The Commissioner
- Robert Warwick as The Sawbwa
- Murvyn Vye as Makesh
- Lisa Montell as Andora
- Robert Cabal as Kumat

== Reception ==
The film was made on a budget of just over $2 million and made roughly $2.5 million at the box office. Most reviews for the movie were positive. The film was noted because the indigenous people of southeast Asia were portrayed as being "respectable" and "dignified" at a time when they were frequently the subject of negative stereotypes in other films. The practice of indirect rule in the British Empire was also accurately portrayed in the film, as members of the British authorities are portrayed as showing deference to local rulers such as the Sawbwa.

== See also ==
- List of American films of 1955
