= The System (1953 film) =

1953 film by Lewis Seiler

- Theatrical release poster
- Directed by: Lewis Seiler
- Screenplay by: Jo Eisinger
- Based on: the story "Investigation" by Edith Grafton and Samuel Grafton
- Produced by: Samuel Bischoff
- Starring: Frank Lovejoy; Joan Weldon
- Cinematography: Edwin B. DuPar
- Edited by: Clarence Kolster
- Music by: David Buttolph
- Production company: Warner Bros. Pictures
- Distributed by: Warner Bros. Pictures
- Release date: April 18, 1953 (United States)
- Running time: 90 minutes
- Country: United States
- Language: English

The System is a 1953 American film noir crime film directed by Lewis Seiler and starring Frank Lovejoy, Joan Weldon and Robert Arthur.

== Plot ==
A bookmaker discovers the hard way that his line of work is a lot more dangerous than he first thought.

== Cast ==
- Frank Lovejoy as John E. "Johnny" Merrick
- Joan Weldon as Felice Stuart
- Robert Arthur as Rex Merrick
- Paul Picerni as David Wiley
- Don Beddoe as Jerry Allen
- Jerome Cowan as Barry X. Brady
- Dan Seymour as Mr. Marty
- Sarah Selby as Mrs. Elizabeth Allen
- Fay Roope as Roger Stuart
- Frank Richards as Charley, Merrick's Butler
- Vic Perrin as Little Harry Goubenek
- Henry Corden as Specs alias Morton Kovick
- Howard Negley as Senator Richard Ketteridge
- Alan Gordon as Big Reuben
- Bruno VeSota as Angelo Bruno

== Reception ==
When the film was first released, The New York Times' review was brutal. The film critic wrote, "It seems quite appropriate for Warner Brothers' The System, a stultified excursion into contemporary crime, to have opened at the Palace yesterday. The morning weather was drab and depressing. So was the picture ... The sad fact to be faced is that there is not a single thing to recommend The System. The performance of the feminine lead, Joan Weldon, is embarrassing in its inadequacy. Mr. Lovejoy makes an honest effort in a professional way, but the script is such a peachy morass he has no chance. That Lewis Seiler, the director, should fail so is more disappointing when one recalls his memorable Guadalcanal Diary." Forget this fiasco, for it is one of those soggy melodramas that serve only to fill out double bills."
