= Romance Land =

1923 film directed by Edward Sedgwick

- Directed by: Edward Sedgwick
- Screenplay by: Joseph F. Poland
- Based on: "The Gun-Fanner" by Kenneth Perkins
- Starring: Tom Mix; Barbara Bedford; Frank Brownlee; George Webb; Pat Chrisman; Wynn Mace
- Cinematography: Daniel B. Clark
- Production company: Fox Film Corporation
- Distributed by: Fox Film Corporation
- Release date: February 11, 1923
- Running time: 50 minutes
- Country: United States
- Languages: Silent; English intertitles

Romance Land is a 1923 American silent Western film directed by Edward Sedgwick and written by Joseph F. Poland. It is based on the story "The Gun-Fanner" by Kenneth Perkins, published in Argosy, June 10 – July 1, 1922. The film stars Tom Mix, Barbara Bedford, Frank Brownlee, George Webb, Pat Chrisman, and Wynn Mace. The film was released on February 11, 1923, by Fox Film Corporation.

== Plot ==
As described in a film magazine, Pep Hawkins read his books and became enthused with the spirit of the heroic Walter Raleigh. He fancies himself as a Lancelot and dons a set of armor as he rides in the western plains. Nan Harvess also sought romance and one day she was rescued by this knight in armor who stopped her runaway team. Although her uncle had promised her hand in marriage to another, she loves Pep. The uncle decides to hold a tournament to settle the question with chariot races and other stunts, and the victor to receive Nan's hand in marriage. When Pep tries to register for the tournament, he is initially ineligible, but finally convinces them that he is. During the tournament the uncle resorts to foul play to rid himself of Pep, but Pep always stages a comeback and finally wins. The uncle is forced to keep his promise and, although he tries at the last minute to prevent the wedding, Pep heroically takes his bride away.

== Cast ==
- Tom Mix as 'Pep' Hawkins
- Barbara Bedford as Nan Harvess
- Frank Brownlee as 'Scrub' Hazen
- George Webb as Counterfeit Bill
- Pat Chrisman as White Eagle
- Wynn Mace as Sheriff
- Tony the Horse

== Preservation ==
A complete copy of Romance Land is held by a film archive.
