= The Great Jewel Robbery =

1925 film

- Directed by: John Ince
- Produced by: John Ince
- Starring: Herbert Rawlinson; Grace Darmond; Frank Brownlee
- Production companies: Kerman Films; Sierra Pictures
- Distributed by: A.G. Steen
- Release date: November 24, 1925
- Running time: 50 minutes
- Country: United States
- Language: Silent (English intertitles)

The Great Jewel Robbery is a 1925 American silent crime drama film directed by John Ince and starring Herbert Rawlinson, Grace Darmond, and Frank Brownlee.

== Plot ==
As described in a film magazine review, private detective Doris Dunbar, on the trail of stolen jewels, visits the Red Mill Inn where jewel thief Hooper and playboy Steve Martindale are drinking. Hooper, in temporary fear of discovery, switches the jewels to Steve's pocket. Later, many complications arise when Hooper attempts to recover the jewels. Doris and Steve become prisoners in the thieve's hideout. Foiled when they attempt to escape, they are rescued by the police and decide to become partners in life.

== Cast ==
- Herbert Rawlinson as Steve Martindale
- Grace Darmond as Doris Dunbar
- Frank Brownlee as McGroody
- Carlton Griffin as Hooper
- Marcella Daly as Mrs. Hooper
- Chester Conklin as Cootie Joe
- John Webb Dillion
- Ina Anson
- Virginia Madison
- William Scott

== Bibliography ==
- Connelly, Robert B. The Silents: Silent Feature Films, 1910-36, Volume 40, Issue 2. December Press, 1998.
- Munden, Kenneth White. The American Film Institute Catalog of Motion Pictures Produced in the United States, Part 1. University of California Press, 1997.
