= Everybody's Magazine =

American magazine published from 1899 to 1929

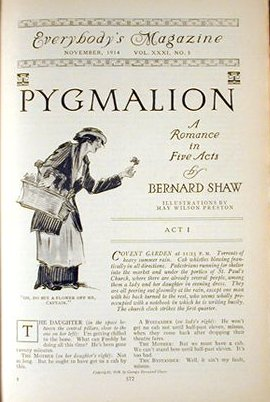
- Cover of the November 1914 edition, in which George Bernard Shaw's Pygmalion began its serialization.
- Publisher: The Ridgway Company
- Founded: 1899
- Final issue: March 1929
- Country: United States
- Based in: New York City

Everybody's Magazine was an American magazine published from 1899 to 1929. The magazine was headquartered in New York City and was published by the Ridgway Company, a subsidiary of the Butterick Publishing Company.

== History and profile ==
The magazine was founded by Philadelphia merchant John Wanamaker in 1899, though he had little role in its actual operations. Initially, the magazine published a combination of non-fiction articles and new fiction stories. By 1926, the magazine had become a pulp fiction magazine and in 1929 it merged with Romance magazine.

In 1903, it had a circulation of 150,000, and Wanamaker sold the magazine for $75,000 to a group headed by Erman Jesse Ridgway. A series of muckraking articles called "Frenzied Finance" in 1904 boosted circulation to well over 500,000, and it stayed above the half million mark for many years. John O'Hara Cosgrave was the editor responsible for running the Frenzied Finance articles. From 1912 to 1914, Trumbull White served as editor and published views on the progression to World War 1 by H. G. Wells, George Bernard Shaw, and Gilbert K. Chesterton. During America's involvement in World War I, circulation declined below 300,000. By the late 1920s, it had declined to about 50,000.

. Beginning in 1915, the magazine began referring to itself simply as Everybody's. Writers who appeared in it include Jack London, Talbot Mundy, Victor Rousseau, O. Henry, A. A. Milne (Milne's novel The Red House Mystery was serialised in the magazine from August to December 1921 as The Red House Murder) Hugh Pendexter, Eleanor Hoyt Brainerd, Raoul Whitfield and Dornford Yates.

The last issue of Everybody's Magazine was published in March 1929. In 1931, publisher Alfred A. Cohen purchased Everybody's Magazine from the Butterick Publishing Company and attempted to revive it with F. Orlin Tremaine as editor. No known issues were produced and the magazine was soon declared discontinued.

== Gallery ==
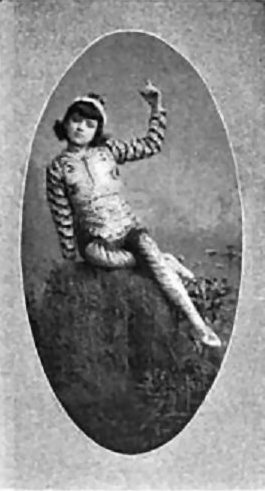
Bijou Fernandez, published, 1903

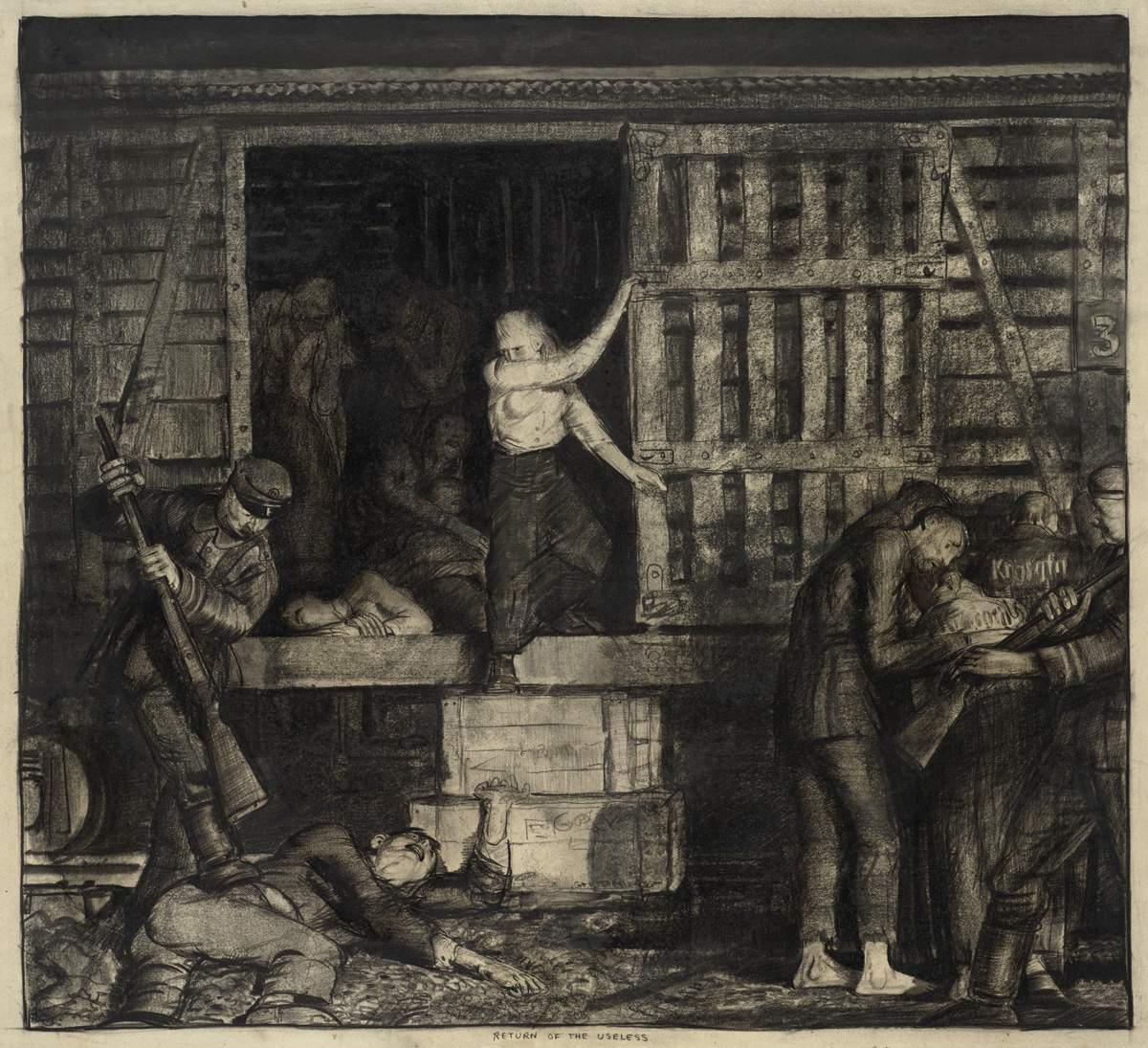
George Bellows
Return of the Useless, published December 1918 to illustrate "Belgium: The Crowning Crime"

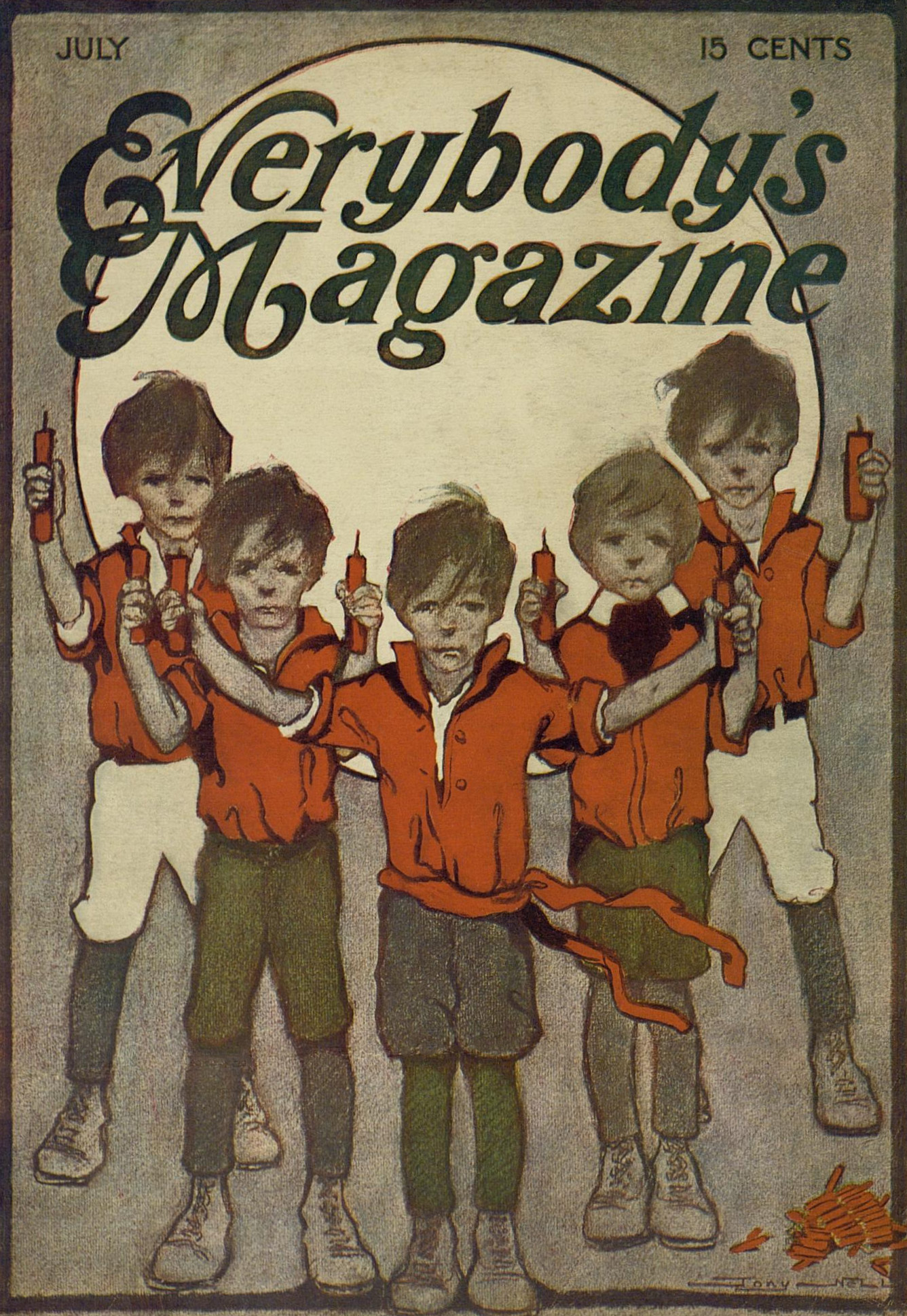
Cover of the July 1907 issue, which features the first appearance of the Cisco Kid in the short story "The Caballero’s Way" by O. Henry.
