= Redbook =

American women's fashion magazine

- Cover of the February 2015 edition featuring Kaley Cuoco
- Editor-in-chief: Meredith Kahn Rollins
- Categories: Lifestyle; women's interest
- Frequency: 12 issues/year
- Founded: 1903; 123 years ago (as The Red Book Illustrated)
- Final issue: January 2019 (print)
- Company: Hearst Magazine Division
- Country: United States
- Language: English
- Website: redbookmag.com
- ISSN: 0034-2106

Redbook is an American women's fashion magazine that is published by the Hearst magazine division. It is one of the "Seven Sisters", a group of women's service magazines. It ceased print publication after January 2019 and now operates exclusively online.

== History ==
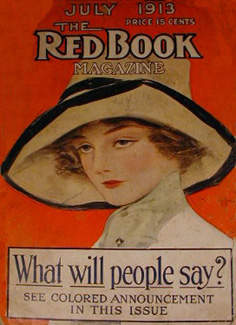
Redbook in 1913

The magazine was first published in May 1903 as The Red Book Illustrated by Stumer, Rosenthal and Eckstein, a firm of Chicago retail merchants. The name was changed to The Red Book Magazine shortly thereafter. Its first editor, from 1903 to 1906, was Trumbull White, who wrote that the name was appropriate because, "Red is the color of cheerfulness, of brightness, of gaiety." In its early years, the magazine published short fiction by well-known authors, including many women writers, along with photographs of popular actresses and other women of note. Within two years the magazine had become a success, climbing to a circulation of 300,000.

When White left to edit Appleton's Magazine, he was replaced by Karl Edwin Harriman, who edited The Red Book Magazine and its sister publications The Blue Book and The Green Book until 1912. Under Harriman the magazine was promoted as "the largest illustrated fiction magazine in the world" and increased its price from 10 cents to 15 cents. According to Endres and Lueck (p. 299), "Red Book was trying to convey the message that it offered something for everyone, and, indeed, it did... There was short fiction by talented writers such as James Oliver Curwood, Jack London, Sinclair Lewis, Edith Wharton and Hamlin Garland. Stories were about love, crime, mystery, politics, animals, adventure and history (especially the Old West and the Civil War)."

Harriman was succeeded by Ray Long. When Long went on to edit Hearst's Cosmopolitan in January 1918, Harriman returned as editor, bringing such coups as a series of Tarzan stories by Edgar Rice Burroughs. During the period the cover price was raised to 25 cents. In 1927, Edwin Balmer, a short story writer who had written for the magazine, took over as editor; in the summer of 1929 the magazine was bought by McCall Corporation, which changed the name to Redbook but kept Balmer on as editor. He published stories by such writers as Booth Tarkington and F. Scott Fitzgerald, nonfiction by women such as Shirley Temple's mother and Eleanor Roosevelt, articles on the Wall Street Crash of 1929 by men like Cornelius Vanderbilt and Eddie Cantor, as well as condensed novels, like Dashiell Hammett's The Thin Man (December 1933). Under Balmer, Redbook became a general-interest magazine for both men and women.

On May 26, 1932, the publisher launched its own radio series, Redbook Magazine Radio Dramas, syndicated dramatizations of stories from the magazine. Stories were selected by Balmer, who also served as the program's host.

Circulation hit a million in 1937, and success continued until the late 1940s, when the rise of television began to drain readers and the magazine lost touch with its demographic. In 1948 it lost $400,000 (equivalent to $5.36 million today), and the next year Balmer was replaced by Wade Hampton Nichols, who had edited various movie magazines. Phillips Wyman took over as publisher. Nichols decided to concentrate on "young adults" between 18 and 34 and turned the magazine around. By 1950 circulation reached two million, and the following year the cover price was raised to 35 cents. It published articles on racial prejudice, the dangers of nuclear weapons, and the damage caused by McCarthyism, among other topics. In 1954, Redbook received the Benjamin Franklin Award for public service.

The next year, as the magazine was beginning to steer towards a female audience, Wyman died, and in 1958 Nichols left to edit Good Housekeeping. The new editor was Robert Stein, who continued the focus on women and featured authors such as Dr. Benjamin Spock and Margaret Mead. In 1965 he was replaced by Sey Chassler, during whose 17-year tenure circulation increased to nearly five million and the magazine earned a number of awards, including two National Magazine Awards for fiction. His New York Times obituary says, "A strong advocate for women's rights, Mr. Chassler started an unusual effort in 1976 that led to the simultaneous publication of articles about the proposed equal rights amendment in 36 women's magazines. He did it again three years later with 33 magazines." He retired in 1981 and was replaced by Anne Mollegen Smith, the first woman editor, who had been with the magazine since 1967, serving as fiction editor and managing editor.

Norton Simon Inc., which had purchased the McCall Corporation, sold Redbook to the Charter Company in 1975. In 1982, Charter sold the magazine to the Hearst Corporation, and in April 1983 Smith was fired and replaced by Annette Capone, who "de-emphasized the traditional fiction, featured more celebrity covers, and gave a lot of coverage to exercise, fitness, and nutrition. The main focus was on the young woman who was balancing family, home, and career." (Endres and Lueck, p. 305) After Ellen Levine took over as editor in 1991, even less fiction was published, and the focus was on the young mother. Levine said, "We couldn't be the magazine we wanted to be with such a big audience, you have to lose your older readers. We did it the minute I walked in the door. It was part of the deal."

Levine moved to Good Housekeeping in 1994, being replaced by McCall's Kate White, who left for Cosmopolitan four years later. Succeeding editors were Lesley Jane Seymour (1998-2001), Ellen Kunes (2001-2004), and Stacy Morrison (2004-2010).

Redbook Magazine has ceased print publication as of its November/December 2018 issue [Vol. 231, No.4]. Redbook's Customer Service page notes itself that Redbook magazine "is no longer being published".

A column by Kelly Faircloth at Jezebel reports secondhand though an AdWeek October 10, 2018, article "that after January 2019, Redbook will become an 'online-only destination'."

== Coverage ==
Redbook's articles are primarily targeted towards married women. The magazine features stories about women dealing with modern hardships, aspiring for intellectual growth, and encouraging other women to work together for humanitarian causes. The magazine profiles successful women to provide inspirational testimonies and advice on life.

== Condensed novels ==
- Dashiell Hammett. The Thin Man (December 1933)
- William Edmund Barrett The Left Hand of God (serialized, July–October 1950)
- Judith Guest. Ordinary People, 1976
- Janet Burroway: Raw Silk, Jan. 1976
- Toni Morrison. Song of Solomon 1977

== Writers ==
- Maya Angelou
- Janet Burroway
- Gail Godwin
- MacKinlay Kantor
- Barbara Kingsolver
- Caroline Leavitt
- Lois Lowry
- Michael Shaara
- Nancy Thayer
- Katharine Weber
