= The Unknown Cavalier =

1926 film directed by Albert S. Rogell

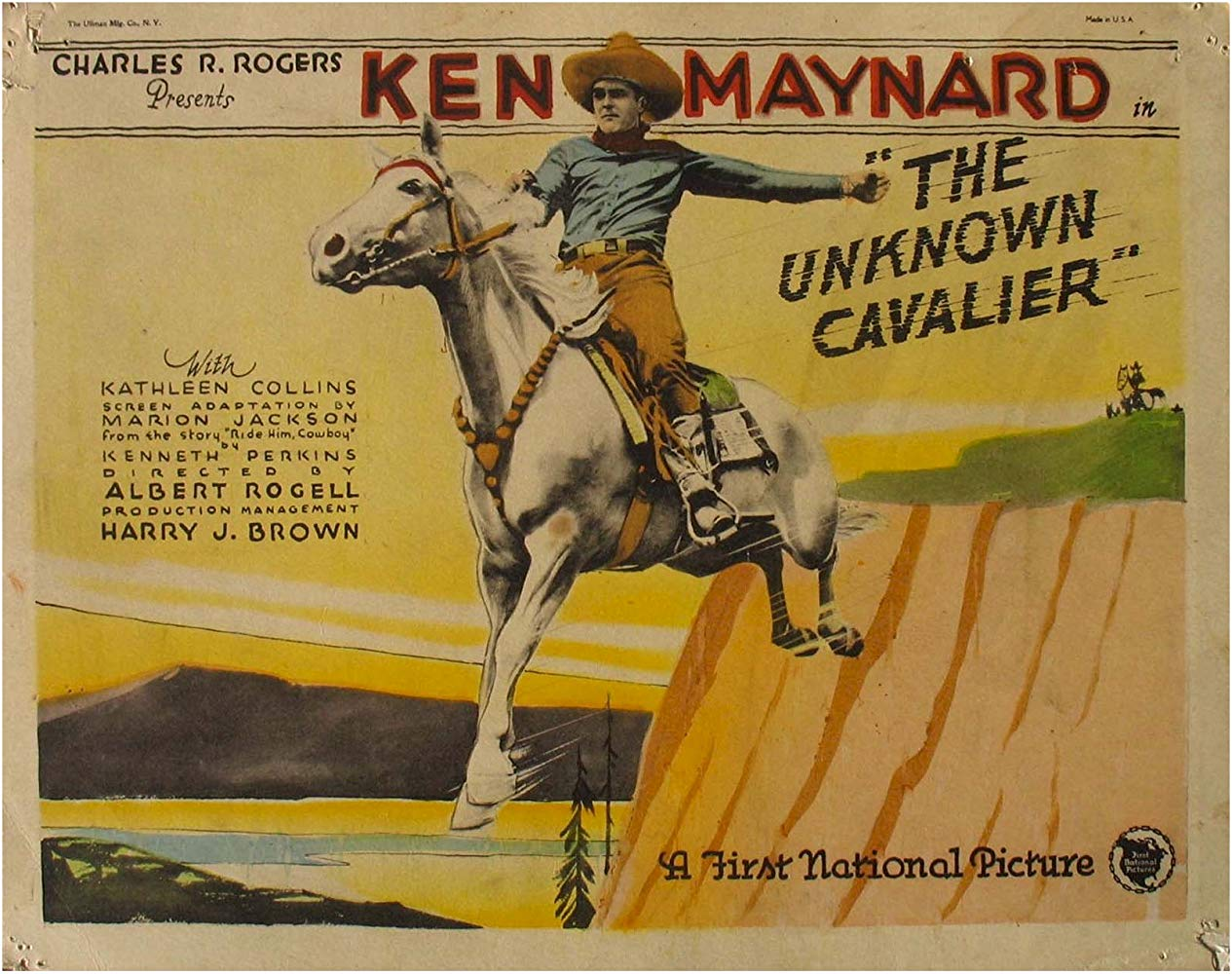
- Lobby card
- Directed by: Albert S. Rogell
- Written by: Marion Jackson; Don Ryan
- Based on: Ride Him, Cowboy by Kenneth Perkins
- Produced by: Charles R. Rogers
- Starring: Ken Maynard; Kathleen Collins; David Torrence
- Cinematography: Sol Polito
- Production company: Charles R. Rogers Productions
- Distributed by: First National Pictures
- Release date: November 14, 1926
- Running time: 70 minutes
- Country: United States
- Language: Silent (English intertitles)

The Unknown Cavalier is a 1926 American silent Western film directed by Albert S. Rogell and starring Ken Maynard, Kathleen Collins, and David Torrence. It is based on the 1923 novel Ride Him, Cowboy by Kenneth Perkins.

== Cast ==
- Ken Maynard as Tom Drury
- Kathleen Collins as Ruth Gaunt
- David Torrence as Peter Gaunt
- T. Roy Barnes as Clout Pettingill
- Jim Mason as Henry Suggs
- Otis Harlan as Judge Blowfly Jones
- Josef Swickard as Lingo
- Bruce Gordon as Bob Webb
- Fred Burns as Sheriff
- Jimmy Boudwin as Billy Gaunt
- Pat Harmon as Bad Man
- Frank Lackteen as Bad Man
- Raymond Wells as Bad Man

== Preservation ==
With no prints of The Unknown Cavalier located in any film archives, it is a lost film.

== Bibliography ==
- Darby, William. Masters of Lens and Light: A Checklist of Major Cinematographers and Their Feature Films. Scarecrow Press, 1991.
