= Trumbull White =

American journalist (1868–1941)

Charles Trumbull White (August 12, 1868 – December 13, 1941) was a prominent American journalist, newspaper and magazine editor, war correspondent, explorer, world traveler, travel writer, and author. Known as Charley White during his early years while growing up, as an adult he dropped his first name and became professionally known simply as Trumbull White. During his lifetime, he became associated in one way or another with many prominent Americans, including Henry C. Wallace, Red Cross founder Clara Barton, Chicago socialite Mrs. Potter Palmer', Ernest Hemingway, publisher George Haven Putnam, and numerous leading journalists across the United States.

== Early life and education ==
White was born in Winterset, Iowa on August 12, 1868, a son of John Trumbull White and Frances Anna McCaughan White. His father was a community leader and excelled in industry as senior partner in White, Munger, & Company, a woolen manufacturing enterprise. John died when Charley was 10 years old, and Charley continued living at home with his mother and siblings. Among his boyhood friends in Winterset was Henry C. Wallace, who later became publisher of Wallace's Farmer in Des Moines and also served as secretary of agriculture under presidents Warren G. Harding and Calvin Coolidge. Charley's first journalistic experience as a youth was writing a letter to the editor of the Iowa State Register in Des Moines which the editor published. When he graduated from Winterset High School in 1886, he delivered an oration entitled "Life's Drama".

Following graduation in 1886, Charley attended Amherst College in Massachusetts for two years. It was during this time that he dropped his first name and used the name Trumbull White the rest of his life. He joined Delta Upsilon, a non-secret, non-hazing fraternity, and was the recording secretary for the Amherst chapter. He did not finish a degree (and perhaps did not intend to do so) but left the college when he took a job as City Editor for the Decatur (IL) Morning Review in 1888.

== Career in newspaper journalism ==
Following brief newspaper experiences in Decatur, IL and in Evansville, Indiana, White moved to Chicago and worked for three newspapers there from 1890-1903. He worked successively for the Chicago Morning News, the Chicago Times, and the Chicago Record. He was joined on some of his journalistic endeavors by his wife, Katherine. The year after their marriage, while Trumbull was reporting for the Chicago Times, they went on a canoeing expedition in southwest Ontario in Canada along the U. S. border. On their expedition, they traveled through relatively unexplored areas and together wrote a series of articles that were entitled "Through Darkest America". They were published in Outing: An Illustrated Monthly Magazine of Sport, Travel, and Recreation from October, 1892 through March, 1893. The articles included photos, illustrations of the authors, and many scenes from their expedition.

Also, in the 1890s while he was working with the various Chicago papers, White was watching the turmoil in the Far East and the outbreak of war between China and Japan in 1894 which ended in a stunning Japanese victory. He felt the importance of writing this for the American reading public was that “it is necessary to say no more than that the conflict involves directly nations whose total population includes more than one-fourth of the human race, as well as the commercial and other interests of all the European and American nations.”

More than a year before the Spanish-American War broke out, White was sent as a special correspondent to cover events during the growing crisis between the United States and Spain over events in Cuba. Although critical of Spain's rule of Cuba, he also blasted the rising yellow journalism in America, stating that “The number of reliable correspondents who have been reporting the course of the war to the American press are few in number, not more than ten or twelve.”

Shortly before the outbreak of the war, the Chicago Record organized a war staff for reporting likely events if and when the war began, which included both Trumbull White and his wife, Katherine. The newspaper supplied its own staff dispatch boat in the Caribbean to carry correspondents wherever the fighting occurred. After the war began, White was placed in charge of a dispatch boat for the Record which in July, 1898 was running between Santiago de Cuba and Kingston, Jamaica. White and Katherine both witnessed action during the war and wrote accounts of the incidents they covered. Katherine also served as a nurse with American Red Cross, serving under Clara Barton. After the war, the Chicago Record put many of their correspondents' stories, including both White's and Katherine's, in book form and was entitled The Chicago Record's War Stories by Staff Correspondents.

== From newspaper to magazine journalism ==
In 1903, Trumbull White shifted his career from newspapers and moved into magazine journalism. This began when he was appointed editor of a new magazine entitled The Red Book Illustrated, now known as Redbook. Under his editorship, the magazine published short stories but not serials, and included a section on photographic art devoted to popular actresses. By the end of the second year the magazine was producing a profit with a circulation of some 300,000 subscribers with sales in New York exceeding those in Chicago.

His success at The Redbook Illustrated led to Trumbull White's move to New York. The publishing house of D. Appleton & Company in New York had acquired the Booklover's Magazine of Philadelphia, renamed it as Appleton's Booklover's Magazine, and called White to become its editor. A year after assuming the editorship, the word Booklover's was dropped from the title, and the magazine then became known simply as Appleton's Magazine. White wrote editorials for the first few pages of each issue. He also wrote on various contemporary topics that often reflected a critical view of the Muckrakers, Progressive Era journalists who critically examined the nation's social and economic problems and whose influence with the public was reaching its height at about that time.

White then spent short periods of time at several other magazines. He was hired to help in the startup of a new magazine, Adventure, which was very different from Appleton's in that Adventure published more pulp fiction stories reminiscent of dime novels. White kept a very low profile with Adventure, his name never appeared in the magazine, he wrote no editorials or letter columns, and he left either late in 1911 or early in 1912. White moved next to Everybody's Magazine and served as editor from 1912 to 1914. Everybody's had been founded in 1899 by the famous Philadelphia merchant, John Wanamaker. By the time White came to the magazine, it was already well established. It featured news, news analysis, essays, editorials on news events, biographical serials, theatrical reviews, and popular fiction. During White's tenure, Everybody's published views on the course of World War I by H. G. Wells, George Bernard Shaw, and Gilbert K. Chesterton. During White's time at Everybody's, circulation stood at about 500,000.

In addition to his years of experience as a magazine editor, White was also a contributor to other magazines as well as to his own. These included the Saturday Evening Post, the New Outlook, and Metropolitan. His contributions extended over forty years from the early 1890s to the 1930s.

== Association with Ernest Hemingway ==
The lives of Trumbull White and Ernest Hemingway intersected in the summer of 1917 and again in the spring of 1918. The first encounter occurred at Bay View Association, or simply Bay View, a Methodist camp near Petoskey, Michigan located on Traverse Bay off the northeast shore of Lake Michigan. White had taught journalism short courses there as early as 1895 and had become editor of The Bay View Magazine. Many prominent Americans were known to vacation or speak at Bay View, such as vice-president Thomas R. Marshall, former vice-president Charles W. Fairbanks, Chicago social worker Jane Addams, perennial presidential candidate William Jennings Bryan, African-American educator Booker T. Washington, and the disability rights leader Helen Keller.

White may have known the Hemingway family before 1917. Ernest had grown up spending summers there. His sister, Marcelline, spent the summer of 1917 with the White family, and Ernest had become friends with one of White's sons, Kenneth S. White. At the age of 18, Hemingway was just getting started in his writing career, and after the end of a party approached White for advice about writing. His essential question was how he could improve his writing and also how he could do it quickly and be better recognized in the field. White “received him kindly,” talked with him openly, and replied that he should learn to write by simply writing and to write on subjects that he could draw on from his own personal experiences.

The second encounter took place in May, 1918, when Hemingway was about to be shipped to Europe to work as an ambulance driver in Italy. His father, Clarence, urged him to stop in New York and see White again before leaving. Ernest was eager for another visit with White and they met on May 19 for a last conversation about writing. It is not known what transpired at the meeting, but several Hemingway biographers have noted how he took White's advice in his future publications, especially in The Sun Also Rises.

== From active journalism to consulting ==
In 1919, White joined the Leo L. Redding Company in New York. The company was designed to help all kinds of organizations such as colleges, political campaigns, and business organizations to successfully raise funds for educational, business, and political purposes. White served as vice-president of the company and after 1930 as editorial counsel.

He also worked with the American Free Trade League, led by publisher George Haven Putnam, which advocated for free trade and against protectionism during the Great Depression in the 1930s. White was a member, and in 1931, when a group of these free trade advocates formed the Council For Tariff Revision, White also joined that group and served as the organizing secretary. The council attempted to pressure Congress into reducing tariffs, but was not successful and apparently ceased functioning by 1933.

== Advocate for African-American World War I soldiers ==
White used his service in other than financial ways by assisting African-American residents in Harlem in 1918 when rumors were afloat about mistreatment of African-American soldiers in the U. S. armed services and by the Germans. This was an era when racial segregation, discrimination, and lynchings of African-Americans in the United States were at their height.

By early 1918, White began hearing rumors of mistreatment of black soldiers by the Germans and by American military practices in the field that caused danger to the troops. He wrote to George Creel, chairman of the Committee on Public Information that had been created shortly after the American declaration of war on April 2, 1917. He began by stating that his letter was about "a matter which seems to me very important and immediate." He informed Creel of at least three rumors that were of major concern: (1) that black regiments were being "terribly abused by their white officers”; (2) that black troops were being discriminated against "in the distribution of troops where the danger and suffering will be greatest"; and (3) that "the Germans have vowed that they will torture all Negroes who may be captured...." and that hundreds of blacks were being tortured "with eyes gouged out and arms cut off...". White was concerned because of his belief that the rumors were "spreading like wildfire" through the Harlem community causing "great distress and disquiet".

White admitted that he did not know whether the rumors of German activities were true, but that even the rumors could do serious harm. However, he believed the Committee on Public Information should do two things. One was for three top black community leaders to be admitted to inspect a local base hospital to investigate the rumors, while the second recommendation was for a lecturer, preferably Irvin S. Cobb, an author, humorist, editor, and a former columnist with the New York World, to go to Harlem and speak to the residents of what he had seen in France with regard to the black troops there; or failing that, some prominent black leader to do the same. White also offered his assistance in working with black preachers and editors in Harlem. Considering the time period in which these events were occurring, Emmet J. Scott, former personal secretary to Booker T. Washington, stated that “wideawake patriotism and deep interest in the welfare of the Negro people are numbered among his many commendable virtues.”

== Author and world traveler ==
White was a prolific author of books as well as a writer and editor of newspapers and magazines. He authored, co-authored, or contributed to about twenty books during his life. Most of these books dealt with current events of the day, history, and travel. Among the early books he published included The Wizard of Wall Street and His Wealth, or The Life and Deeds of Jay Gould, (1892), a critical biography of the business tycoon and his methods of creating vast wealth; Chicago's World Fair Columbian Exposition 1893 (1893) with co-author William Inglehart and an introduction by Bertha Matilde Honorè Palmer, wife of Chicago businessman Potter Palmer, and which was highly illustrated. Following the First Sino-Japanese War in 1894, he published The War in the East, Japan, China, and Corea (1895) which included sections on history, religion social customs, art, science, literature and forms of government of these countries.

Following the Spanish-American War and the Philippine-American War, Trumbull produced several books. First, The Chicago Record's War Stories, by Staff Correspondents in the Field (1898), as mentioned above. Within a few years, White produced a number of books about the conflict and its aftermath, including Our War With Spain For Cuba's Freedom (1898); Pictorial History of Our War with Spain for Cuba's Freedom (1898); United States in War with Spain and the History of Cuba (1898); Our New Possessions (1898); and The Story of China...and Her Neighbors (1900.)

Also in the early 1900s, Trumbull White traveled considerably around the world and published several highly illustrated books. One of them was entitled Pacific Tours and Around the World, published in 1900. He also traveled extensively through Asia and the Pacific. He visited the Hawaiian Islands, Tahiti, New Zealand, and Australia, then proceeded to the Asian continent and toured through India and Egypt. After returning to America he then went on tour through China, Japan, Mongolia, Siberia, South Africa, and the West Indies. Illustrations in Pacific Tours and Around the World include photos of people in these countries in everyday activities, such as riding in a bullock cart in India and a trolley in Ceylon (now Sri Lanka), a scene in an Arabian cafe, a portrait of a village chief in Palestine, pictures of a Japanese orchestra, a Muslim at prayer, dancing dervishes, and Spanish Fandango dancers. The book cover featured a panoramic color photo of the Pyramids of Giza in Egypt.

White also published other books on a variety of topics. These included travel books such as Glimpses of the Orient (1897.) He also published War Between Japan and Russia (1904.) In the scientific field, he published The World's Progress in Knowledge, Science, and Industry (1902.) As late as 1938 he published Puerto Rico and Its People from notes taken during the period of the war with Spain.

(See Selected Works section below for full titles.)

== Personal life ==
White married Katherine Short in Winterset, Iowa on July 15, 1890. She died on 28 June 1959 at Bryn Mawr Park, Westchester County, New York.

They had three sons, Lawrence Trumbull White (1893-?), Owen Sheppard White (1893–1970), and Kenneth Sheldon White (1905-1964.) Lawrence apparently died before 1900, as he does not appear in the United States Federal Census of that year.

Owen taught drama at Carnegie Institute of Technology (now Carnegie-Mellon University) in the years after his graduation and also played parts in Shakespearean plays on the campus. In later years, he taught as assistant professor of English at the University of Puerto Rico.

Kenneth worked for Popular Publications, publishers of pulp fiction magazines such as Gang World, Battle Aces, Western Rangers, Detective Action, Dime Detective, and Black Mask. He worked with the organization until 1949. He also edited Adventure from 1943 to 1946 as his father had done previously. Kenneth later established an office in New York as an authors' representative, helping writers publish their works.

== Final years ==
White's final years were spent writing and in leisure time at Bay View near Petoskey, Michigan. He died in New York City on December 13, 1941. His remains were sent to the crematory at Ferncliff Cemetery and Mausoleum in Greenburgh, Westchester County, New York.

== Major publications ==
Trumbull White published at least twenty books during his lifetime. This is not a complete list of his book publications, but those that could be identified. White was sole author of some of these books, co-author, editor, or contributor in others. Lengthy titles were included in their entirety. Some book references did not identify publishers, city of publication, and/or publication dates. They are listed in chronological order by publication date.

- Trumbull White, The Wizard of Wall Street and His Wealth, or The Life and Deeds of Jay Gould. Chicago. Mid-Continent Publishing Company, 1892
- Trumbull White and William Igleheart, The World's Columbian Exposition, Chicago, 1893. A Complete History of the Enterprise; a Full Description of the Buildings and Exhibits in All Departments; and a Short Account of Previous Expositions, with an Introduction. Chicago. Elliott & Beezley, 1893
- Trumbull White, The War in the East, Japan, China, and Corea. Philadelphia. P. W. Ziegler & Company, 1895
- Trumbull White (ed.), Silver or Gold; or Both Sides of the Shield: A Symposium of the Views of All Parties on the Currency Question as Expressed by Their Leading Advocates. Chicago. P. W. Ziegler & Company, 1895
- Trumbull White, Glimpses of the Orient: Manners, Customs, Life of People of China, Japan and Philippines, Caroline Islands and Ladrone Islands. Philadelphia & Chicago. P. W. Ziegler & Company, 1897
- Trumbull White, Our War With Spain for Cuba's Freedom: A Thrilling Account of the Land and Naval Operations of American Soldiers and Sailors in Our War with Spain, and the Heroic Struggles of Cuban Patriots Against Spanish Tyranny: Including a Description and History of Cuba, Spain, Philippine Islands, our Army and Navy, Fighting Strength, Coast Defenses, and our Relations with Other Nations, Etc. Etc. San Francisco. The Whitaker & Ray Company, 1898
- Trumbull White, Pictorial History of Our War with Spain for Cuba's Freedom. A Thrilling Account of the Land and Naval Operations of American Soldiers and Sailors in Our War With Spain, and the Heroic Struggles of Cuban Patriots Against Spanish Tyranny. Boston. Freedom Publishing Company, 1898
- Trumbull White, United States in War with Spain and the History of Cuba; A Thrilling Account of the Land and Naval Operations of American Soldiers and Sailors in Our War with Spain, and the Heroic Struggles of Cuban Patriots Against Spanish Tyranny. Chicago. International Publishing Company, c1898
- Trumbull White, Our New Possessions...Four Books in One... A Graphic Account, Descriptive and Historical, of the Tropic Islands of the Sea Which Have Fallen Under Our Sway, Their Cities, Peoples, and Commerce, Natural Resources and the Opportunities They Offer to Americans. Philadelphia. World Bible House, 1898
- Trumbull White, Pacific Tours and Around the World. Journeys via the American and Australien Line to Hawaii, Samoa, Fiji, Tahiti, New Zealand, Australia, China, Japan, The Philippines, East Indies, India, Egypt, The Holy Land, Africa, The Mediterranean, Europe, South America, Etc. Chicago. Rand, McNally & Company, 1900
- Trumbull White and James P. Boyd, The Story of China...and Her Neighbors, Their Manners, Customs, Life and History, From the Earliest Times to the Present Including the Boxer Uprising Massacre of Foreigners and Operations of the Allied Powers. James P. Boyd, 1900
- Trumbull White, In the Shadow of Death: Martinique and the World's Great Disasters. Chicago. American Newspaper Publishers Association, 1902
- Trumbull White, The World's Progress in Knowledge, Science, and Industry: a Vast Treasury and Compendium of the Achievements of Man and the Works of Nature. 1902
- Trumbull White and Richard Linthicum, War Between Japan and Russia. The Complete Story of the Desperate Struggle Between Two Great Nations with Dominion Over the Orient as the Tremendous Prize. Illinois, 1904
- Augustus Lynch Mason, et al., Trumbull White (contributor), True Stories of Our Pioneers; The Heroic Deeds and Devoted Lives of the Fathers and Mothers of America, Embracing the Principal Episodes in the Struggle of the White Race and the Red Men for the Possession of the New World, E. E. Merriam, 1904
- Trumbull White and Herbert B. Mulford, The “Square Deal”: Or, Flashes from the Searchlight; Humanity's Plea for Justice and Protection Against Oppression by the Great Financial and Commercial Powers Whose Marvelous Growth is the Wonder of the World. W. R. Vansant, 1905
- Trumbull White, Richard Linthicum, and Samuel Fallows, Complete Story of the San Francisco Horror; Eruption of Mount Vesuvius. Published by Hubert D. Russell, 1906
- Trumbull White, Mark H. Salt, and Herbert B. Mulford, Candidates and the Issues, 1908
- Trumbull White, William J. Jackman, and Ferdinand Ellsworth Cary, The Fireside of Knowledge; A Pictorial Library for Home Reading, covering all the very latest events in the Workshops of the Industrial, Scientific and Natural World. Chicago. Homewood Press, 1914
- Trumbull White, Puerto Rico and Its People. New York. Frederick A. Stokes, 1938

The number and description of articles Trumbull White published in various magazines throughout his career is vast and unknown. However, a notable series of articles that Trumbull and Katherine White published in 1892-1893 about their travels near the Canadian border was an extended work due to the sheer length and detail of the articles plus the numerous photos, engravings, and illustrations of the authors and many scenes from their expedition.

- Trumbull White and Mrs. Katherine White, “Through Darkest America,” Outing: An Illustrated Monthly Magazine of Sport, Travel, and Recreation, Volume 21, October, 1892-March, 1893, pp. 3-10, 92-101, 197-204, 320-324, 396-401, 461-463. Illustrated by Albert Hencke. Engravings by Hoskin and Connolly.
