= Joan Weldon =

American actress (1930–2021)

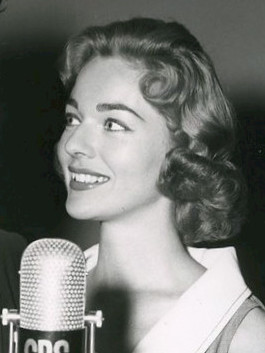
- Weldon in 1955
- Born: Joan Louise Welton; August 5, 1930; San Francisco, California, U.S.
- Died: February 11, 2021 (aged 90); Fort Lauderdale, Florida, U.S.
- Occupations: Singer, film and television actress
- Years active: 1953–1958 (film and television); 1953–1980 (singer)
- Spouse: Dr. David Podell (1966–2021, her death)
- Children: 1

Joan Weldon (born Joan Louise Welton; August 5, 1930 – February 11, 2021) was an American actress and singer in film, television, and theatre.

== Early years ==
Weldon was born in San Francisco, California, in 1930. Her grandmother, Olio Cornell, raised her there after she "was left motherless at five." Weldon's great-grandfather was an actor on stage and in vaudeville. She attended Galileo High School, and was inducted into its Hall of Merit in 2019.

== Career ==
In 1953, Weldon appeared as the soprano soloist on a broadcast of The Standard Hour on NBC radio.

=== Stage ===
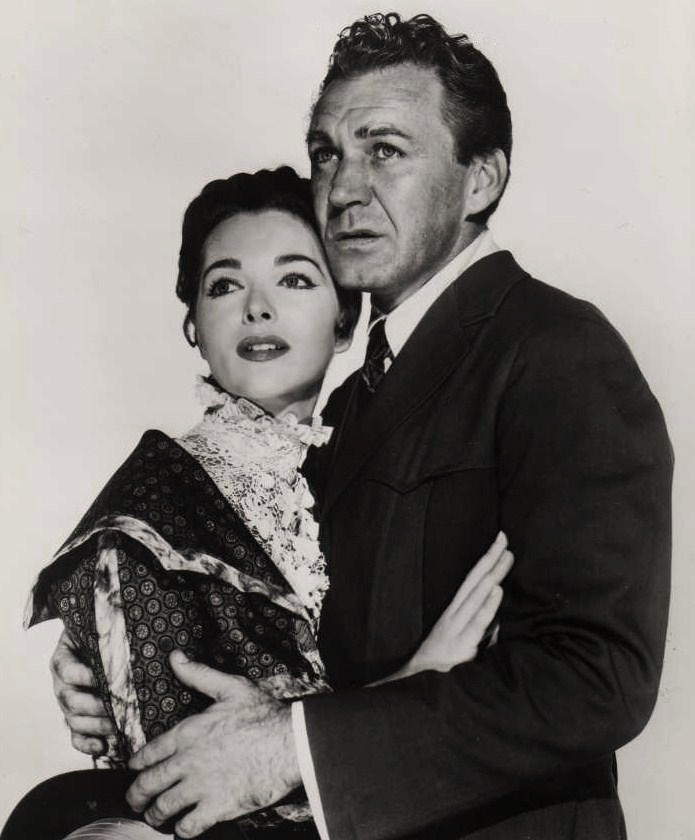
Joan Weldon and Forrest Tucker in The Music Man (1960)

Weldon began her career singing in the San Francisco Grand Opera Company chorus. She also sang with the Los Angeles Civic Light Opera. On Broadway, she appeared in Kean. She sang at the opening of the New York State Theater at Lincoln Center in 1964.

After working in film and television, she resumed her career as a singer in road company productions, including The Music Man and Oklahoma! Weldon retired in 1980.

=== Film ===
Weldon's film debut came in the 1953 film The System. Although her background was singing in operas, The System and her next two films, So This Is Love and The Command, all had her in non-singing roles.

She became a contract actress with Warner Bros. Pictures where she remained until her contract ended in 1954. Her most prominent film was the cult thriller Them!

=== Television ===
Weldon had a brief television career in the 1950s. Her first appearance in 1955 was in an episode of The Millionaire, starring Marvin Miller. She made three appearances on Lux Video Theater in various roles. She also played Marian Keats in the title role of the Perry Mason episode, "The Case of the Angry Mourner" in 1957 (Season 1, episode 7). In 1958, she portrayed Grace Wheeler in an episode of Maverick titled "Plunder of Paradise" starring Jack Kelly, Leo Gordon and Ruta Lee. She appeared in Cheyenne as a professional singer, and performed a duet with Clint Walker. She appeared in the Have Gun – Will Travel episode "The Singer". Her final television appearance was in 1958 on Shirley Temple Theater.

In 1955, Weldon was one of the regular singers on the syndicated program This Is Your Music.

== Filmography ==
- The System (1953) as Felice Stuart
- So This Is Love (1953) as Ruth Obre
- The Stranger Wore a Gun (1953) as Shelby Conroy
- The Command (1954) as Martha Cutting
- The Boy from Oklahoma (1954) as Maybelle - Saloon Girl on Porch (uncredited)
- Riding Shotgun (1954) as Orissa Flynn
- Them! (1954) as Dr. Patricia Medford
- Deep in My Heart (1954) as Performer in 'New Moon'
- Lux Video Theatre (1954–1956, TV Series) as Anne / Patricia Dean
- The Millionaire (1955, TV Series) as Star Conway
- Gunsight Ridge (1957) as Molly Jones
- Cheyenne (1957, TV Series) as Nellie Merritt
- Perry Mason (1957, TV Series) as Marion Keats
- Day of the Badman (1958) as Myra Owens
- Have Gun – Will Travel (1958, TV Series) as Faye Hollister
- Colt .45 (1958, TV Series) as Edith Murrow
- Maverick (1958, TV Series) as Grace Wheeler
- Shirley Temple's Storybook (1958, TV Series) as Amelia
- Home Before Dark (1958) as Frances Barrett (final film role)
