= Blue Book (magazine) =

Former American magazine

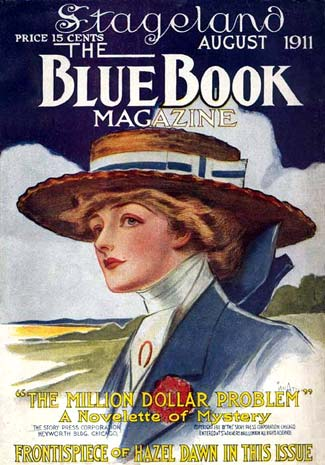
- Categories: Pulp magazine, Men's magazine
- Founded: 1905
- Final issue: 1975
- Country: United States
- Language: English

Blue Book was a popular 20th-century American magazine with a lengthy 70-year run under various titles from 1905 to 1975. It was a sibling magazine to The Red Book Magazine and The Green Book Magazine.

Launched as The Monthly Story Magazine, it was published under that title from May 1905 to August 1906 with a change to The Monthly Story Blue Book Magazine for issues from September 1906 to April 1907. In its early days, Blue Book also carried a supplement on theatre actors called "Stageland". The magazine was aimed at both male and female readers.

For the next 45 years (May 1907 to January 1952), it was known as The Blue Book Magazine, Blue Book Magazine, Blue Book, and Blue Book of Fiction and Adventure. The title was shortened with the February 1952 issue to simply Bluebook, continuing until May 1956. With a more exploitative angle, the magazine was revived with an October 1960 issue as Bluebook for Men, and the title again became Bluebook for the final run from 1967 to 1975. In its post-1960 final incarnation, Bluebook became a men's adventure magazine, publishing purportedly true stories.

In its 1920s heyday, Blue Book was regarded as one of the "Big Four" pulp magazines (the best-selling, highest-paying and most critically acclaimed pulps), along with Adventure, Argosy and Short Stories. The magazine was nicknamed "King of the Pulps" in the 1930s. Pulp historian Ed Hulse has stated that between the 1910s and the 1950s Blue Book "achieved and sustained a level of excellence reached by few other magazines".

== Publishers and editors ==
The early publishers were Story-Press Corporation and Consolidated Magazines, followed in 1929 by McCall. After H.S. Publications took over the reins in October 1960, Hanro (Sterling) was the publisher from August 1964 until March 1966 and then the QMG Magazine Corporation, beginning April 1967.

The first editor of Blue Book was Trumbull White (who would later edit Adventure magazine). White was succeeded in 1906 by Karl Edwin Harriman. Under Harriman, Blue Book would reach a circulation of 200,000 copies in 1909. From 1911 to 1919 Ray Long was the editor. Harriman took the editorial reins again in February 1919. By the time of Harriman's departure, sales of Blue Book had fallen to 80,000 copies. Edwin Balmer edited Blue Book from 1927 to 1929. Balmer managed to raise the circulation of the magazine to 180,000 by 1929, probably due to the reappearance of Burroughs' Tarzan stories in the magazine. Balmer was succeeded by Blue Book's longest running editor, Donald Kennicott (1929 to January 1952). Later editors were Maxwell Hamilton (February 1952 through the mid-1950s) and Andre Fontaine in the mid-1950s, followed by Frederick A. Birmingham. Maxwell Hamilton returned for the 1960 revival, followed by B. R. Ampolsk in 1967.

== Illustrators and writers ==
Cover artists during the 1930s included Dean Cornwell, Joseph Chenoweth, Henry J. Soulen, and Herbert Morton Stoops, who continued as the cover artist during the 1940s. Interior Illustrators for the magazine included Alex Raymond and Austin Briggs (better known for their comics work), John Clymer, John Richard Flanagan, Joseph Franke, L. R. Gustavson, and Henry Thiede.

The first Blue Book contributors included science-fiction authors George Allan England, William Hope Hodgson and William Wallace Cook. Blue Book also published the "Free Lances in Diplomacy" (1910) series by Clarence H. New (1862–1933) of early spy stories. Rider Haggard and Albert Payson Terhune also published work in Blue Book. Zane Grey and Clarence E. Mulford added their Western stories to the magazine's selection of fiction.

In the 1920s, Blue Book's roster of authors included two of the world's most famous writers of popular fiction: Edgar Rice Burroughs and Agatha Christie. In addition to Tarzan, Burroughs published The Land of Hidden Men, a 1929 Blue Book short story by Burroughs. The characters of Sax Rohmer, James Oliver Curwood, and Beatrice Grimshaw appeared in Blue Book. Adventure fiction was a staple of Blue Book; in addition to Burroughs, P. C. Wren, H. Bedford-Jones, Achmed Abdullah, George F. Worts, Lemuel de Bra (who specialized in "Chinatown" thrillers) and William L. Chester (with his Burroughs-influenced "Hawk of the Wilderness", about a white boy adopted by Native Americans) all published in the magazine. Sea stories were also popular in Blue Book, and George Fielding Eliot, Captain A. E. Dingle and Albert Richard Wetjen were some of the publication's authors known for this subgenre. Bedford-Jones and Donald Barr Chidsey wrote historical fiction for Blue Book.

Writers during the 1940s included Nelson S. Bond, Max Brand, Gelett Burgess, Eustace Cockrell, Irvin S. Cobb, Robert A. Heinlein, MacKinlay Kantor, Willy Ley, Theodore Pratt, Ivan Sanderson, Luke Short (pseudonym of Frederick D. Glidden, 1908–1975), Booth Tarkington, Malcolm Wheeler-Nicholson, Philip Wylie and Dornford Yates. Blue Book managed to attract fiction from a number of authors who did not normally publish in pulp magazines, including Georges Simenon, Shelby Foote and William Lindsay Gresham.

== Anthologies ==
General anthologies from Blue Book:

- Vondys, Horace. Best Sea Stories from Bluebook. Introduced by Donald Kennicott.(The McBride Company, 1954).

Single author/team collections from Blue Book:

- Bedford-Jones, H., One More Hero:The Cases of the Fireboat Men. (Altus Press, 2018).
- Bedford-Jones, H., The Rajah From Hell. (Black Dog Books, 2012).
- Bedford-Jones, H., Ships and Men. (Altus Press, 2019).
- Bedford-Jones, H., The Sphinx Emerald. (Altus Press, 2014).
- Bedford-Jones, H., They Lived by the Sword. (Atlus Press, 2017).
- Bedford-Jones, H., The Thunderbolt of Indra: The Complete Crimes of the Rajah from Hell. (Altus Press, 2020).
- Bedford-Jones, H., Treasure Seekers. (Altus Press, 2015).
- Bedford-Jones, H., Warriors in Exile. (Altus Press, 2017).
- Bedford-Jones, H., Wilderness Trail. (Murania Press, 2013).
- Burroughs, Edgar Rice, Jungle Tales of Tarzan. (McClurg, 1919).
- Chester, William L., Hawk of the Wilderness. (Ace Books, 1966).
- Makin, William J., The Garden of TNT: The Collected Adventures of the Red Wolf of Arabia, edited by Tom Roberts.(Black Dog Books, 2015).
- Mill, Robert R., Shock Troops of Justice: Duke Ashby of the F.B.I. (Black Dog Books, 2012).
- Wylie, Philip and Balmer, Edwin. When Worlds Collide & After Worlds Collide (J. B. Lippincott, 1951).

== Sources ==
- An Index to Blue Book Magazine, compiled by Mike Ashley, Victor A. Berch and Peter Ruber, was completed in 2004 but has yet to be published.
