= Hugh Sanders =

American actor (1911–1966)

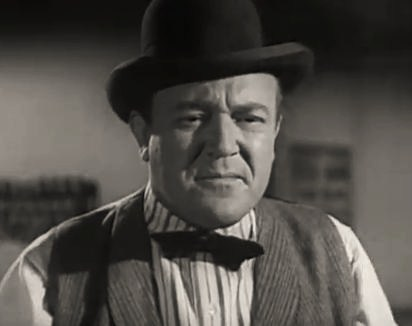
- Sanders in The Fighter, 1952
- Born: Howard William Sanders; March 13, 1911; East St. Louis, Illinois, U.S.
- Died: January 9, 1966 (aged 54)
- Education: Northwestern University
- Occupation: Actor
- Years active: 1949–1966
- Spouse(s): Dorothy F Allsup (m. 1947; div. 1952) Janet Barrett (m. 1952)
- Children: 2

Hugh Sanders (born Howard William Sanders; March 13, 1911 – January 9, 1966) was an American actor. He is probably best known for playing the role of Dr. Reynolds, Maycomb’s local physician, in the movie To Kill a Mockingbird.

== Early life ==
Sanders was born and raised in East St. Louis, Illinois, the only child of William F. Sanders and Edith Broughton. He graduated from Northwestern University's Medill School of Journalism.

Sanders was in radio work for seventeen years, his wife Dorothy Allsup being a former educational director with WHIO (AM) in Dayton, Ohio, before resigning once they married. Sanders had cited affiliations with different radio stations: WHIO (AM) in their Springfield, Ohio, branch; WOR (AM) in New York City; and then for WJLS (AM) in Beckley, West Virginia.

He continued his radio hosting throughout the war until 1949, and then made the transition to Hollywood.

== Career ==
=== Film ===
Sanders appeared in over 70 Hollywood films between 1949 and 1966.

=== Television ===
He was a guest star in several series, including The Lone Ranger, Highway Patrol, Four Star Playhouse, Playhouse 90, Alfred Hitchcock Presents, Maverick, Richard Diamond, Private Detective, Zane Grey Theater, Bat Masterson, The Many Loves of Dobie Gillis, The Asphalt Jungle, and Straightaway. He also made five guest appearances on Perry Mason, including two roles as murder victims: John Callender in "The Case of the Fan Dancer's Horse" (1957), and Ken Bascombe in "The Case of the Bashful Burro" (1960). He also had eight appearances on Rawhide, four on Bonanza, and four on The Fugitive.

== Personal life ==
Sanders was married to Dorothy Allsup of Dayton, Ohio.

== Filmography ==
- 1949: Undertow - Dice Table Bettor (uncredited)
- 1950: The Great Rupert - Mulligan
- 1950: The Damned Don't Cry - Grady
- 1950: Mister 880 - Thad Mitchell
- 1950: Mrs. O'Malley and Mr. Malone - Mr. Askenfelder (uncredited)
- 1950: The Magnificent Yankee - Parker, Secretary (uncredited)
- 1951: Storm Warning - Charlie Barr
- 1951: Sugarfoot - Asa Goodhue
- 1951: Three Guys Named Mike - Mr. Wiliams
- 1951: Only the Valiant - Captain Eversham
- 1951: I Was a Communist for the FBI - Clyde Garson
- 1951: The Travelers - Frank Newcombe
- 1951: That's My Boy - Coach Wheeler
- 1951: Strictly Dishonorable - Harry Donnelly
- 1951: Tomorrow Is Another Day - Detective Lieutenant George Conover
- 1951: Flying Leathernecks - General on Guadalcanal (uncredited)
- 1951: Cave of Outlaws - Sheriff
- 1952: Indian Uprising - Ben Alsop
- 1952: Boots Malone - Matson
- 1952: The Fighter - Roberts
- 1952: The Pride of St. Louis - Horst
- 1952: The Sellout - Judge Neeler
- 1952: Montana Territory - Jason Waterman
- 1952: The Winning Team - Joe McCarthy
- 1952: Something for the Birds - Jim Grady
- 1952: The Steel Trap - Mr. Greer, Passport clerk
- 1953: Last of the Comanches - Denver Kinnaird
- 1953: The Blue Gardenia - 'Chronicle' Managing Editor (uncredited)
- 1953: Scared Stiff - Cop on Pier
- 1953: Gun Belt - Douglas Frazer
- 1953: Here Come the Girls - Captain (uncredited)
- 1953: City of Bad Men - Sheriff Bill Gifford
- 1953: Thunder Over the Plains - H.L. Balfour
- 1953: The Glass Web - Police Lieutenant Mike Stevens
- 1953: The Wild One - Charlie Thomas
- 1953: The Lone Ranger (TV Series) (Season 3 Episode 21: "The Godless Men") - Frank Ferris
- 1953: The Lone Ranger (TV Series) (Season 3 Episode 26: "Sinner by Proxy") - Sheriff Burley
- 1954: The Lone Ranger (TV Series) (Season 4 Episode 7: "Outlaw's Trail") - Clyde Norton
- 1954: The Lone Ranger (TV Series) (Season 4 Episode 10: "Rendezvous at Whipsaw") - Matthew Block
- 1954: Untamed Heiress - Williams
- 1954: Silver Lode - Reverend Field
- 1954: Shield for Murder - Packy Reed
- 1955: The Lone Ranger (TV Series) (Season 4 Episode 21: "The Quiet Highwayman") - Gill Canby
- 1955: The Lone Ranger (TV Series) (Season 4 Episode 50: "The Sheriff's Wife") - Deputy Waters
- 1955: I Cover the Underworld - Tim Donovan
- 1955: 5 Against the House - Pat Winters (uncredited)
- 1955: Finger Man - Mr. Burns
- 1955: Chicago Syndicate - Pat Winters
- 1955: The Last Command - Sam Houston
- 1955: I Died a Thousand Times - Mr. Baughman (uncredited)
- 1955: Top Gun - Ed Marsh
- 1955: The Star and the Story (TV Series) (Season 1 Episode 19: "Newspaper Man") - Lieutenant Hendricks
- 1955: The Star and the Story (TV Series) (Season 1 Episode 23: "The Norther")
- 1955: The Star and the Story (TV Series) (Season 2 Episode 3: "The Man Who Was Dead") - Dr. Franklin Crane
- 1956: The Star and the Story (TV Series) (Season 2 Episode 12: "Payment in Kind") - Captain Sommers
- 1956: The Star and the Story (TV Series) (Season 2 Episode 18: "Act of Decision") - Mr. Beavers
- 1956: Glory - Sobbing Sam Cooney
- 1956: Miami Exposé - Chief Charles Landon
- 1956: The Peacemaker - Lathe Sawyer
- 1957: Alfred Hitchcock Presents (Season 2 Episode 21: "Number Twenty-Two") - Booking Officer
- 1957: Chain of Evidence - Morton Ramsey (uncredited)
- 1957: The Phantom Stagecoach - Martin Maroon
- 1957: The Guns of Fort Petticoat - Sergeant Webber (uncredited)
- 1957: The Careless Years - Uncle Harry
- 1957: Jailhouse Rock - Prison Warden (uncredited)
- 1958: Going Steady - Mr. Ahern
- 1958: Life Begins at 17 - Harry Peck
- 1958: Voice in the Mirror - A.W. Hornsby
- 1959: The Twilight Zone (Season 1 Episode 10: "Judgment Night") - Jerry Potter
- 1959: Never Steal Anything Small - Union Spokesman (uncredited)
- 1959: Warlock - Sheriff Keller (uncredited)
- 1959: Don't Give Up the Ship - Admiral Rogers
- 1959: The Big Operator - Senator Leland (uncredited)
- 1959: Rawhide (Season 1 Episode 20: "Incident of the Judas Trap") - Marshal McVie
- 1960: Rawhide (Season 2 Episode 19: "Incident of the Sharpshooter") - Sheriff Fischer
- 1960: Dennis the Menace (Season 1 Episode 30: "Dennis by Proxy") - Mr. Sanderson
- 1960: Cage of Evil - Martin Bender, Fence
- 1960: Shadow of the Boomerang
- 1960: Perry Mason (Season 4, Episode 6: "The Case of the Wandering Widow") - "Warren Donner"
- 1960: The Music Box Kid - Stanley Sandman (Chesty's lawyer) (uncredited)
- 1961: The Twilight Zone (Season 3 Episode 12: "The Jungle") - Templeton
- 1961: Man-Trap - E.J. Malden
- 1961: Rawhide (Season 3 Episode 13: "Incident of the Promised Land") - Marshal Thorpe
- 1961: Rawhide (Season 3 Episode 14: "Incident of the Big Blowout") - Marshal Thorpe
- 1962: Rawhide (Season 5 Episode 14: "Incident of Decision") - Harvey Calvin
- 1962: Dennis the Menace (Season 4 Episode 6: "Dennis in Gypsyland") - Police Chief
- 1962: The Real McCoys - Mr. Merken
- 1962: The Wild Westerners - Chief Marshal Reuben Bernard
- 1962: Gunsmoke (Season 7 Episode 18: Old Dan") - Thede
- 1962: Panic in Year Zero! - Evacuee from Chatsworth (uncredited)
- 1962: To Kill a Mockingbird - Dr. Reynolds (uncredited)
- 1962: Mister Ed (Season 3 Episode 13: "Horse of a Different Color") - Mr. Armstrong
- 1962: Laramie (Season 3 Episode 24: "Justice in a Hurry") - Ev Keleher
- 1963: Laramie (Season 4 Episode 29: "The Marshals") - Rafferty
- 1963: The Twilight Zone (Season 4 Episode 14: "Of Late I Think of Cliffordville") - Cronk
- 1963: The Fugitive (Season 1 Episode 3: "The Other Side of the Mountain") - Leo
- 1963: The Virginian (Season 2 Episode 3: "No Tears for Savannah") - Foley
- 1963: Rawhide (Season 6 Episode 9: "Incident of the Prophecy") - Dr. Merrill
- 1964: Rawhide (Season 6 Episode 26: "Incident at Deadhorse: Part I") - Deputy Ef Wiley
- 1964: Rawhide (Season 6 Episode 27: "Incident at Deadhorse: Part II") - Deputy Ef Wiley
- 1964: Petticoat Junction (Season 1 Episode 16: "Bobbie Jo and the Beatnik") - Roger Stanley
- 1964: The Alfred Hitchcock Hour (Season 2 Episode 13: "The Magic Shop") - 1st Cop
- 1964: Mister Ed (Season 4 Episode 24: "The Prowler") - Sergeant Myers
- 1964: Apache Rifles - Arizona Delegate
- 1964: The Fugitive (Season 2 Episode 15: "Ballad for a Ghost") - Sheriff Larson
- 1964: The Addams Family - (Season 1 Episode 14: " Art and The Addams Family") Bosley Swaine, an art critic friend of Gomez Addams.
- 1965: Mister Ed (Season 5 Episode 8: "What Kind of Foal Am I?") - Detective Hawkins
- 1965: Harum Scarum - U.S. Ambassador McCord (uncredited)
- 1965: The Fugitive (Season 2 Episode 28)
- 1965: The Addams Family - (Season 2 Episode 9 "Morticia, the Sculptress") reprised role of Bosley Swaine, an art critic friend of Gomez Addams.
- 1966: The Fugitive (Season 3 Episode 19: "Echo of a Nightmare") - Al
- 1966: Incident at Phantom Hill - Regan's Party Guest (uncredited)
- 1966: The Oscar - Mr. Cole (uncredited) (final film role)
