= Frank Ferguson =

American actor (1899–1977)

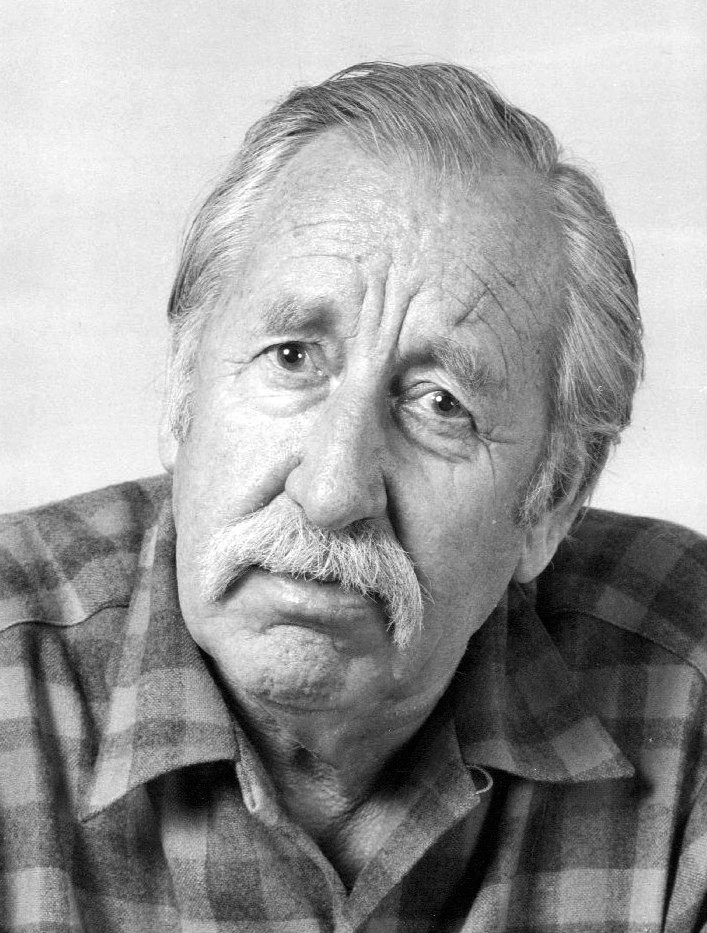
- Frank Ferguson as Eli Carson on NBC's Return to Peyton Place (1972)
- Born: December 25, 1899; Ferndale, California, U.S.
- Died: September 12, 1978 (aged 78); Los Angeles, California, U.S.
- Education: University of California; Cornell University
- Occupation: Actor
- Years active: 1929–1977

Frank S. Ferguson (December 25, 1899 – September 12, 1978) was an American character actor with hundreds of appearances in both film and television.

== Early life ==
Ferguson was born in Ferndale, California on 25 December 1899. the younger of two children of W. Thomas Ferguson, a native Scottish merchant, and his American wife Annie Boynton. He graduated from Ferndale High School in 1917. He earned a bachelor's degree in speech and drama at the University of California and a master's degree from Cornell University. Later, he would teach classes at both UCLA and Cornell.

== Career ==
As a young man, he became connected with Gilmor Brown, the founder and director of the Pasadena Community Playhouse, and became one of its first directors. He directed as well as acted in many plays there. He also taught at the Playhouse.

He made his film debut in 1940 in Gambling on the High Seas.

In 1948, Ferguson appeared as "McDougal", the quickly agitated owner of "McDougal's House of Horrors", in the Universal comedy horror film "Abbott & Costello Meet Frankenstein". In 1952, he had an uncredited role as a jailer in the film Ma and Pa Kettle at the Fair. He also appeared in episodes 149, 173, and 178 of "The Lone Ranger".

In 1952, Ferguson played the part of a music professor at Pomona College in the second of two short films starring Jascha Heifetz, produced by Rudolph Polk and Bernard Luber. The set-up was that Heifetz and his accompanist, Emanuel Bay, had visited the college in order to see a collection of music/music scores. As they are leaving, the professor catches them and asks if Heifetz will come to his class and say a few words. He does, but when there are no questions immediately, he starts to leave. Suddenly there are some questions, and then it turns into a recital. In 1954, Ferguson had an uncredited, but important role in Black Tuesday as Police Inspector Hailey, who refuses to negotiate with criminals hiding in a warehouse.

Ferguson had a well-known role as the Swedish ranch handyman, Gus Broeberg, on the 1956 CBS television series, My Friend Flicka, based on a novel of the same name. He appeared with Gene Evans, Johnny Washbrook and Anita Louise. At this time, Ferguson also portrayed the Calverton veterinarian in the first several seasons of CBS's Lassie.

In 1964–1965, Ferguson portrayed Pa Stockdale in the ABC-TV comedy No Time for Sergeants.

Ferguson played three different characters on The Andy Griffith Show, three different characters on Laramie, two different characters on Petticoat Junction, four different characters on Bonanza, four different characters on Perry Mason (including three episodes as a sheriff), and four different characters on the ABC/WB western, Maverick. He guest starred on other series, including the syndicated Gunsmoke, Cheyenne, Rescue 8, Bat Masterson, Whirlybirds, and The Everglades; NBC's The Restless Gun, Riverboat, Overland Trail, National Velvet, and Mr. Novak; ABC's The Real McCoys, The Rifleman, The Alaskans, Target: The Corruptors, The Asphalt Jungle, and Mr. Smith Goes to Washington; and CBS's General Electric Theater (hosted by Ronald W. Reagan), and The Texan, starring Rory Calhoun. Ferguson appeared twice in 1956 as Henry Murdock (a name similar to his character in The Pride of the Family) on the syndicated western-themed crime drama, The Sheriff of Cochise.

He guest starred in all three of Rod Cameron's crime series, City Detective (1955), State Trooper (in the 1957 episode "No Blaze of Glory", the story of a presumed arson case with a surprise ending, co-starring Vivi Janiss as his wife) and Coronado 9 (1960). He also guest starred, in the role of a hobo Beaver befriends, during the final season of ABC's Leave It to Beaver sitcom in 1963.

Ferguson played the role of Eli Carson in the primetime ABC serial Peyton Place and reprised the role in the later daytime version Return to Peyton Place. Ferguson also appeared in an episode of Green Acres in 1969.

== Death ==
Ferguson died in Los Angeles of cancer on September 12, 1978. By the time of his death, he had appeared in nearly 200 feature films and hundreds of TV episodes.

== Selected filmography ==
- Young Tom Edison (1940) as Customer on the train (uncredited) (film debut)
- Gambling on the High Seas (1940) as City District Attorney
- Father Is a Prince (1940) as Ben Haley
- Four Mothers (1941) as Music Foundation Director (uncredited)
- Bullets for O'Hara (1941) as Prosecutor (uncredited)
- You'll Never Get Rich (1941) as Justice of the Peace (uncredited)
- Passage from Hong Kong (1941) as Ship's Doctor (uncredited)
- They Died with Their Boots On (1941) as Grant's Secretary (uncredited)
- The Body Disappears (1941) as Prof. McAuley (uncredited)
- Reap the Wild Wind (1942) as Snaith (uncredited)
- Broadway (1942) as Reporter (uncredited)
- My Gal Sal (1942) as Loud Customer (uncredited)
- This Gun for Hire (1942) as Albert Baker
- Grand Central Murder (1942) as Det. Mike McAdams (uncredited)
- Spy Ship (1942) as Burns
- Ten Gentlemen from West Point (1942) as Alden Brown
- Moonlight Masquerade (1942) as Doctor (uncredited)
- Wings for the Eagle (1942) as Hansford (uncredited)
- The War Against Mrs. Hadley (1942) as Reporter (uncredited)
- The Spirit of Stanford (1942) as Psychology Professor (uncredited)
- You Can't Escape Forever (1942) as Coroner (uncredited)
- City of Silent Men (1942) as Fred Bernard
- The Boss of Big Town (1942) as Bram Hart
- Truck Busters (1943) as George Havelock
- The Meanest Man in the World (1943) as Teller (uncredited)
- Mission to Moscow (1943) as American Newsman (uncredited)
- Pilot No. 5 (1943) as Mr. Tully (uncredited)
- Salute to the Marines (1943) as Pvt. Williams (uncredited)
- Thrill of a Romance (1945) as 1st Hotel Monte Belva Clerk (uncredited)
- Secrets of a Sorority Girl (1945) as Justin Farley
- The Dolly Sisters (1945) as Reporter at Boat Docking (uncredited)
- O.S.S. (1946) as Electronics Engineer (uncredited)
- Blonde for a Day (1946) as Walter Bronson
- The Searching Wind (1946) as Embassy Attendant (uncredited)
- Night and Day (1946) as Tina's Father (uncredited)
- Canyon Passage (1946) as Preacher (uncredited)
- Little Miss Big (1946) as Dr. Raymond (uncredited)
- If I'm Lucky (1946) as Statistician (scenes deleted)
- Lady Chaser (1946) as Attorney J. T. Vickers
- Swell Guy (1946) as Eddie (uncredited)
- Cross My Heart (1946) as Reporter (uncredited)
- The Man I Love (1947) as Army Doctor (uncredited)
- California (1947) as Cavalry Lieutenant on Patrol (uncredited)
- The Perfect Marriage (1947) as Gentleman (uncredited)
- The Beginning or the End (1947) as Dr. James B. Conant
- The Farmer's Daughter (1947) as Maatinaan
- Danger Street (1947) as Boward – Police Chief (uncredited)
- Blaze of Noon (1947) as Cash Jones (uncredited)
- Killer at Large (1947) as Edward Denton
- Welcome Stranger (1947) as Crane (uncredited)
- The Trouble with Women (1947) as Mr. Metcalfe (uncredited)
- The Perils of Pauline (1947) as Movie Theatre Owner (uncredited)
- They Won't Believe Me (1947) as Cahill
- Variety Girl (1947) as R.J. O'Connell
- Cass Timberlane (1947) as Court Clerk (uncredited)
- The Fabulous Texan (1947) as Andy Renfro (uncredited)
- T-Men (1947) as Secret Service Man (uncredited)
- Road to Rio (1947) as Texas Posse Member (uncredited)
- The Bride Goes Wild (1948) as Reporter (uncredited)
- The Inside Story (1948) as Eph – Editor of The Bugle
- The Miracle of the Bells (1948) as Dolan
- Fort Apache (1948) as Newspaperman (uncredited)
- The Hunted (1948) as Paul Harrison
- Fighting Father Dunne (1948) as M.R. Colpeck (uncredited)
- Abbott and Costello Meet Frankenstein (1948) as Mr. McDougal
- The Vicious Circle (1948) as Stark
- The Babe Ruth Story (1948) as Danny's Father (uncredited)
- The Walls of Jericho (1948) as Tom Ransome (uncredited)
- They Live by Night (1948) as Bum (uncredited)
- Walk a Crooked Mile (1948) as Carl Bemish
- Rachel and the Stranger (1948) as Mr. Green
- That Wonderful Urge (1948) as Findlay (uncredited)
- Dynamite (1949) as 'Hard Rock' Mason
- Shockproof (1949) as Logan (uncredited)
- Slightly French (1949) as Marty Freeman (uncredited)
- State Department: File 649 (1949) as Consul Reither
- Caught (1949) as Dr. Hoffman
- Homicide (1949) as Albert Murray (uncredited)
- The Barkleys of Broadway (1949) as Mr. Perkins (uncredited)
- Follow Me Quietly (1949) as J.C. McGill
- Roseanna McCoy (1949) as Ellison Hatfield
- Free for All (1949) as Hap Ross
- Dancing in the Dark (1949) as John Sharkey (uncredited)
- Key to the City (1950) as Councilman (uncredited)
- Tyrant of the Sea (1950) as Officer (uncredited)
- The Good Humor Man (1950) as Insp. Quint
- Louisa (1950) as Park Attendant (uncredited)
- The Lawless (1950) as Carl Green
- The Furies (1950) as Dr. Grieve
- Right Cross (1950) as Dr. George Esmond (uncredited)
- He's a Cockeyed Wonder (1950) as Sheriff Oliver (uncredited)
- Under Mexicali Stars (1950) as Counterfeitor Goldie
- The West Point Story (1950) as Commandant (uncredited)
- Watch the Birdie (1950) as Mr. Whittle (uncredited)
- Frenchie (1950) as Jim Dobbs
- The Great Missouri Raid (1951) as Bank Teller (uncredited)
- Santa Fe (1951) as Marshal Bat Masterson
- Thunder in God's Country (1951) as Bates
- Warpath (1951) as Marshal
- The People Against O'Hara (1951) as George (uncredited)
- The Barefoot Mailman (1951) as Doc Bethune (uncredited)
- Elopement (1951) as Pinkie's Father (uncredited)
- The Model and the Marriage Broker (1951) as Conventioneer (uncredited)
- On Dangerous Ground (1951) as Willows
- Room for One More (1952) as Steve (uncredited)
- Boots Malone (1952) as Detective Agency Head (uncredited)
- The Cimarron Kid (1952) as Prison Warden (uncredited)
- Bend of the River (1952) as Tom Grundy
- Rancho Notorious (1952) as Preacher
- Rodeo (1952) as Harry Cartwright
- The Marrying Kind (1952) as Mr. Quinn (uncredited)
- Oklahoma Annie (1952) as Eldridge Haskell
- Models Inc. (1952) as Joe Reynolds – the Banker
- The Winning Team (1952) as Sam Arrants
- Has Anybody Seen My Gal (1952) as Edward Norton
- Wagons West (1952) as Cyrus Cook
- Ma and Pa Kettle at the Fair (1952) as Sam (uncredited)
- It Grows on Trees (1952) as John Letherby
- The Iron Mistress (1952) as Doctor (uncredited)
- Million Dollar Mermaid (1952) as Prosecutor
- Stars and Stripes Forever (1952) as Mr. Wells (scenes deleted)
- Star of Texas (1953) as Marshal Bullock
- The I Don't Care Girl (1953) as Ned (uncredited)
- The Stars Are Singing (1953) as Doorman (uncredited)
- The Blue Gardenia (1953) as Drunk Reporter (uncredited)
- Woman They Almost Lynched (1953) as Bartender (uncredited)
- The Lone Hand (1953) as Mr. Dunn the Banker
- Trouble Along the Way (1953) as Mike Edwards (uncredited)
- House of Wax (1953) as Medical Examiner (uncredited)
- The Marksman (1953) as Champ Wiley
- Powder River (1953) as Johnny Slater
- The Beast from 20,000 Fathoms (1953) as Dr. Morton
- Hannah Lee (1953) as John Britton
- So This Is Love (1953) as High School Commencement Speaker (uncredited)
- Big Leaguer (1953) as Wally Mitchell
- City of Bad Men (1953) as Easterner at Training Camp (uncredited)
- Main Street to Broadway (1953) as Mr. Cope in Fantasy Sequence
- So Big (1953) as Ed (uncredited)
- Wicked Woman (1953) as Bill Porter
- Texas Bad Man (1953) as Gil
- Dragonfly Squadron (1954) as Col. Conners (uncredited)
- Riding Shotgun (1954) as Townsman (uncredited)
- Johnny Guitar (1954) as Marshal Williams
- The Outcast (1954) as Chad Polsen
- The Shanghai Story (1954) as Mr. Haljerson
- A Star Is Born (1954) as Judge George J. Barnes (uncredited)
- Drum Beat (1954) as Mr. Dyar
- Black Tuesday (1954) as Police Inspector Hailey (uncredited)
- Young at Heart (1954) as Bartell
- The Violent Men (1955) as Mahoney (uncredited)
- Battle Cry (1955) as Mr. Hector Walker
- New York Confidential (1955) as Dr. Ludlow
- The Eternal Sea (1955) as Admiral L.D.
- City of Shadows (1955) as District Attorney Hunt
- Moonfleet (1955) as Coachman
- The McConnell Story (1955) as Mechanic
- Trial (1955) as Kiley (uncredited)
- A Lawless Street (1955) as Abe Deland (uncredited)
- At Gunpoint (1955) as Marshal George Henderson
- The Phantom Stagecoach (1957) as Joe Patterson
- The Iron Sheriff (1957) as District Attorney Holloway
- Gun Duel in Durango (1957) as Sheriff Howard
- This Could Be the Night (1957) as Mr. Shea – Landlord
- The Lawless Eighties (1957) as Owen Sutter
- Cole Younger, Gunfighter (1958) as Sheriff Ralph Wittrock
- The Light in the Forest (1958) as Harry Butler
- Terror in a Texas Town (1958) as Deacon Matt Holmes
- Man of the West (1958) as Crosscut Marshal (uncredited)
- Revolt in the Big House (1958) as Gannon's Lawyer (uncredited)
- Andy Hardy Comes Home (1958) as Mayor Benson
- The Restless Gun (1958) as Sheriff - Episode "Remember the Dead"
- The Big Night (1960) as Dave
- Raymie (1960) as Rex
- Sunrise at Campobello (1960) as Dr. Bennett
- Pocketful of Miracles (1961) as Newspaper Editor
- Hush...Hush, Sweet Charlotte (1964) as Editor
- The Quick Gun (1964) as Dan Evans
- Those Calloways (1965) as Doctor (uncredited)
- The Great Sioux Massacre (1965) as Gen. Alfred Howe Terry (final film)
