= Hazel Brooks =

American actress

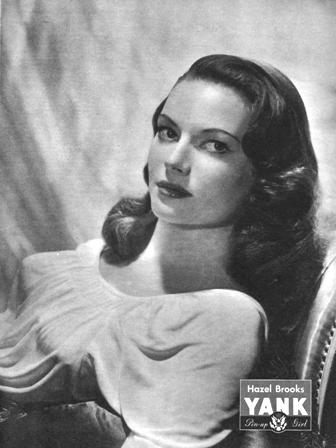
- Born: September 8, 1924; Cape Town, Union of South Africa
- Died: September 18, 2002 (aged 78); Bel Air, Los Angeles, California, U.S.
- Other names: Hazel Brooks Ross; Hazel Brooks Gibbons
- Occupation: Actress
- Years active: 1943–1955
- Spouse: Cedric Gibbons (m. 1944; died 1960)

Hazel Brooks (September 8, 1924 – September 18, 2002) was an American actress.

== Early years ==
The daughter of a sea captain, Brooks was born in Cape Town, South Africa. Her father died when she was three years old, and she moved with her mother to Brooklyn, New York. Her mother remarried and then divorced, resulting in custody battles over Brooks's half-brother. Brooks described her childhood as "very unhappy", noting that she attended 14 schools.

== Career ==
Brooks became a model when she was 16 and was represented by Harry Conover and Walter Thornton. A talent scout picked her and five other models to appear in the MGM film Du Barry Was a Lady (1943). She made a series of pictures at the studio during the 1940s, culminating with a supporting role in the 1947 film Body and Soul with John Garfield.

A photo of her by Durward Garyhill was voted "Most Provocative Still of 1947" by the International Society of Photographic Arts in January 1948.

She had captured almost as much attention three years earlier in 1944 when, at age 20, she married the long-time head of her studio's fabled art department, Cedric Gibbons, then 54. The wedding occurred on October 25, 1944.

She had subsequent roles in Arch of Triumph and Sleep, My Love in 1948, as well as The Basketball Fix (1951) and The I Don't Care Girl (1953).

== Death ==
Brooks died in 2002, aged 78, in the Bel Air residential district of Los Angeles.

== Filmography ==
Year	Title	Role	Notes
1943	Du Barry Was a Lady	Miss June	Uncredited
1943	Girl Crazy	Showgirl	Uncredited
1944	Rationing	Information Girl	Uncredited
1944	Patrolling the Ether	Taxi Driver	Uncredited
1944	Meet the People	Show Girl	Uncredited
1944	Marriage Is a Private Affair	Bridesmaid	Uncredited
1944	Thirty Seconds Over Tokyo	Girl in Officers' Club	Uncredited
1945	Without Love	Girl on Elevator	Uncredited
1945	Ziegfeld Follies	Dancer	Uncredited
1946	The Harvey Girls	Dance-Hall Girl	Uncredited
1947	Body and Soul	Alice	
1948	Sleep, My Love	Daphne	
1948	Arch of Triumph	Sybil	Uncredited
1951	The Basketball Fix	Lily Courtney	
1953	The I Don't Care Girl	Stella Forrest	
