= Television broadcaster =

Telecommunications network for TV programming

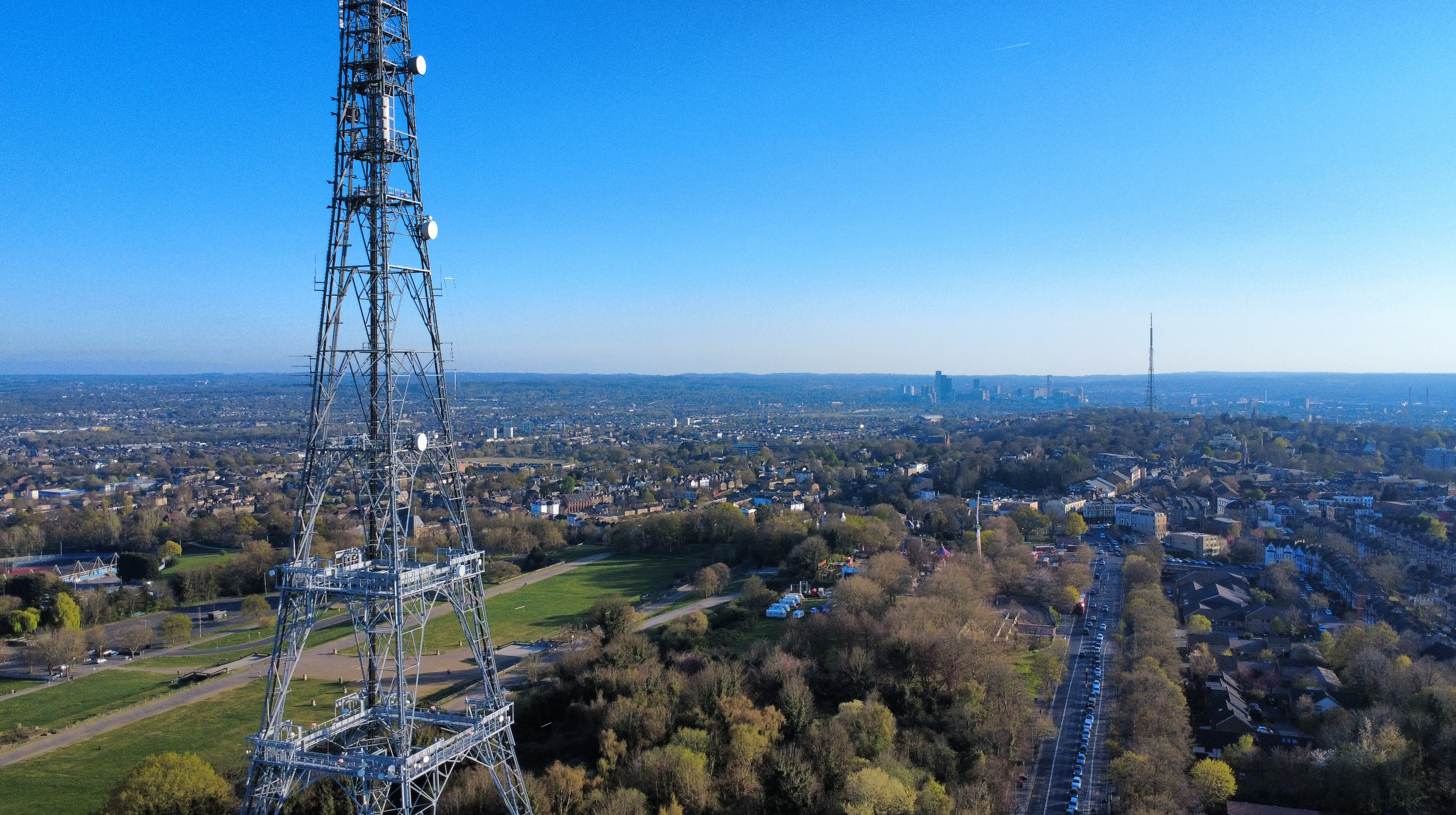
A BBC television and radio transmitting station, Crystal Palace, with Croydon transmitting station in the distance

A television broadcaster or television network is a telecommunications network for the distribution of television content, where a central operation provides programming to many television stations, pay television providers or, in the United States, multichannel video programming distributors. Until the mid-1980s, broadcast programming on television in most countries of the world was dominated by a small number of terrestrial networks. Many early television networks such as the BBC, CBC, PBS, PTV, NBC or ABC in the US and in Australia evolved from earlier radio networks.

== Overview ==
In countries where most networks broadcast identical, centrally originated content to all of their stations, and where most individual television transmitters therefore operate only as large "repeater stations", the terms "television network", "television channel" (a numeric identifier or radio frequency) and "television station" have become mostly interchangeable in everyday language, with professionals in television-related occupations continuing to make a differentiation between them. Within the industry, a tiering is sometimes created among groups of networks based on whether their programming is simultaneously originated from a central point, and whether the network master control has the technical and administrative capability to take over the programming of their affiliates in real-time when it deems this necessary – the most common example being during national breaking news events.

In North America in particular, many television networks available via cable and satellite television are branded as "channels" because they are somewhat different from traditional networks in the sense defined above, as they are singular operations – they have no affiliates or component stations, but instead are distributed to the public via cable or direct-broadcast satellite providers. Such networks are commonly referred to by terms such as "specialty channels" in Canada or "cable networks" in the U.S.

A network may or may not produce all of its own programming. If not, production companies (such as Warner Bros. Television, Universal Television, Sony Pictures Television and TriStar Television) can distribute their content to the various networks, and it is common that a certain production firm may have programs that air on two or more rival networks. Similarly, some networks may import television programs from other countries, or use archived programming to help complement their schedules.

Some stations have the capability to interrupt the network through the local insertion of television commercials, station identifications and emergency alerts. Others completely break away from the network for their own programming, a method known as regional variation. This is common where small networks are members of larger networks. The majority of commercial television stations are self-owned, even though a variety of these instances are the property of an owned-and-operated television network. The commercial television stations can also be linked with a noncommercial educational broadcasting agency. Some countries have launched national television networks, so that individual television stations can act as common repeaters of nationwide programs.

Cable television has also brought major changes to television networks related to cultural programming. The emergence of cable made possible new channels in major media markets, including programs aimed at bicultural Latino audiences in the United States. This expanded the range of audiences that networks and affiliates could target with programming.

This is explained by media historian Tim P. Vos in his 2010 journal article "A Cultural Explanation for Early Broadcast Policy," where he examines targeted-group and non-targeted-group representations as well as the cultural specificity employed by television networks. Vos notes that policymakers did not expressly intend to create a broadcast order dominated by commercial networks. In fact, legislative attempts were made to limit the network's preferred position.

As to individual stations, modern network operations centers usually use broadcast automation to handle most tasks. These systems are not only used for programming and for video server playout, but use exact atomic time from Global Positioning Systems or other sources to maintain perfect synchronization with upstream and downstream systems, so that programming appears seamless to viewers.

== Global ==
A major international television broadcaster is the British Broadcasting Corporation (BBC), which is perhaps most-well known for its news agency BBC News. Owned by the Crown, the BBC funds itself in two ways. UK services branded under BBC are funded by the television license paid by British residents, as a result no advertising appears on these services. The advertising-funded arm (BBC Studios) employs 23,000 people worldwide including the operation of broadcaster UKTV in the UK itself. Experimental television broadcasts were started in 1929, using an electromechanical 30-line system developed by John Logie Baird. Limited regular broadcasts using this system began in 1934 and an expanded service (now known as BBC Television) started from Alexandra Palace in November 1936.

== History ==
Electronic television was made and demonstrated in San Francisco, on September 7, 1927, it was designed by Philo Taylor Fransworth who has been working on it since 1920.

== United States ==
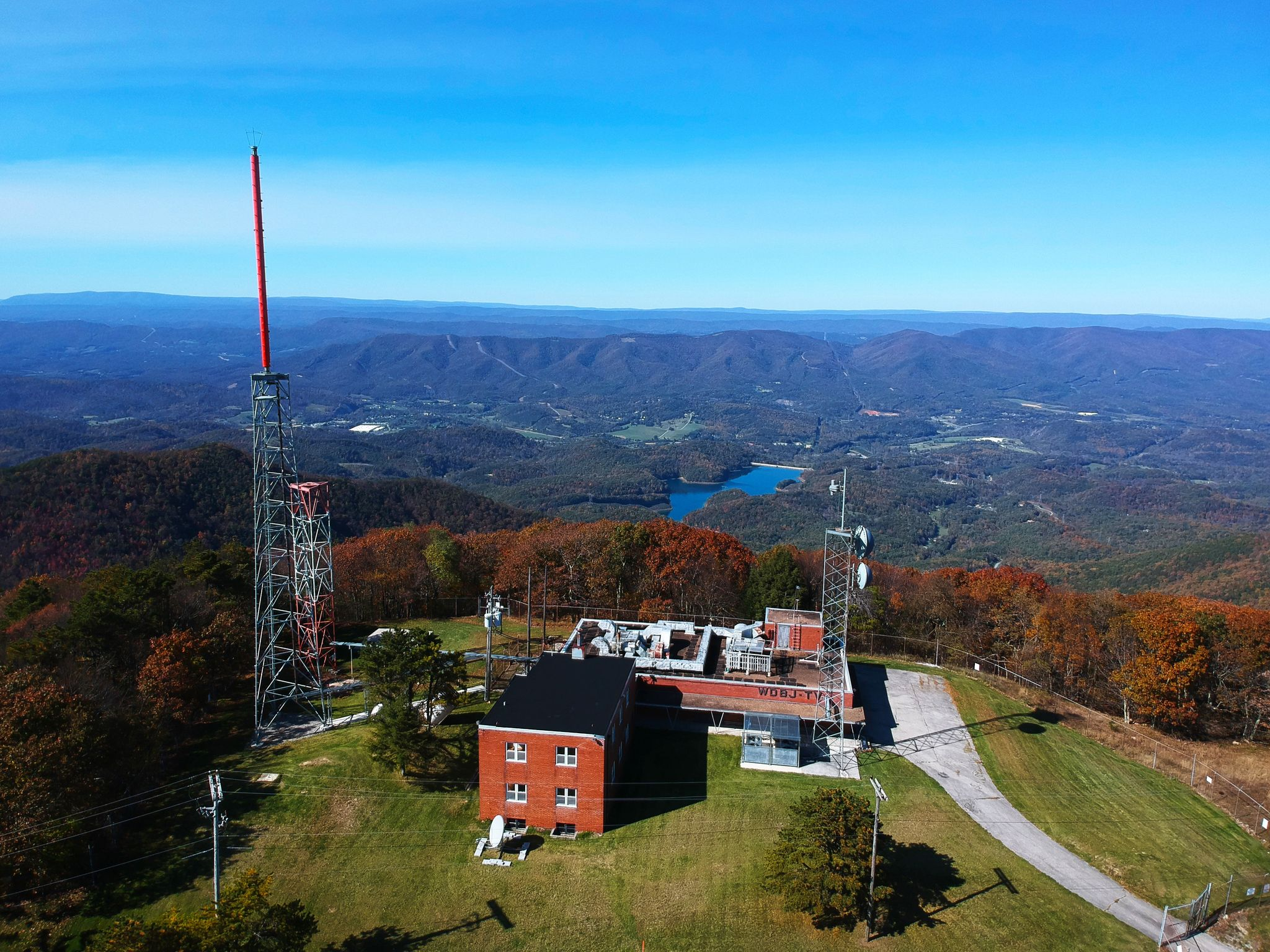
Television transmitter for WDBJ, a CBS affiliate in Virginia

Television in the United States had long been dominated by the Big Three television networks, the American Broadcasting Company (ABC), CBS (formerly the Columbia Broadcasting System) and the National Broadcasting Company (NBC); however, the Fox Broadcasting Company (Fox), which launched in October 1986, has gained prominence and is now considered part of the "Big Four". The Big Three provide a significant number of programs to each of their affiliates, including newscasts, prime time, daytime and sports programming, but still reserve periods during each day where their affiliate can air local programming, such as local news or syndicated programs. Since the creation of Fox, the number of American television networks has increased, though the amount of programming they provide is often much less: for example, The CW only provides fifteen hours of primetime programming each week (along with three hours on Saturdays), while MyNetworkTV only provides ten hours of primetime programming each week, leaving their affiliates to fill time periods where network programs are not broadcast with a large amount of syndicated programming. Other networks are dedicated to specialized programming, such as religious content or programs presented in languages other than English, particularly Spanish.

The largest television network in the United States, however, is the Public Broadcasting Service (PBS), a non-profit, publicly owned, non-commercial educational service. In comparison to the commercial television networks, there is no central unified arm of broadcast programming, meaning that each PBS member station has a significant amount of freedom to schedule television shows as they consent to. Some public television outlets, such as PBS, carry separate digital subchannel networks through their member stations (for example, Georgia Public Broadcasting; in fact, some programs airing on PBS were branded on other channels as coming from GPB Kids and PBS World).

This works as each network sends its signal to many local affiliated television stations across the country. These local stations then carry the "network feed", which can be viewed by millions of households across the country. In such cases, the signal is sent to as many as 200+ stations or as little as just a dozen or fewer stations, depending on the size of the network.

With the adoption of digital television, television networks have also been created specifically for distribution on the digital subchannels of television stations (including networks focusing on classic television series and films operated by companies like Weigel Broadcasting (owners of Movies! and Me-TV) and Nexstar Media Group (owners of Rewind TV and Antenna TV), along with networks focusing on music, sports and other niche programming).

Cable and satellite providers pay the networks a certain rate per subscriber (the highest charge being for ESPN, in which cable and satellite providers pay a rate of more than $5.00 per subscriber to ESPN). The providers also handle the sale of advertising inserted at the local level during national programming, in which case the broadcaster and the cable/satellite provider may share revenue. Networks that maintain a home shopping or infomercial format may instead pay the station or cable/satellite provider, in a brokered carriage deal. This is especially common with low-power television stations, and in recent years, even more so for stations that used this revenue stream to finance their conversion to digital broadcasts, which in turn provides them with several additional channels to transmit different programming sources.

=== History ===
Television broadcasting in the United States was heavily influenced by radio. Early individual experimental radio stations in the United States began limited operations in the 1910s. In November 1920, Westinghouse signed on "the world's first commercially licensed radio station", KDKA in Pittsburgh, Pennsylvania. Other companies built early radio stations in Detroit, Boston, New York City and other areas. Radio stations received permission to transmit through broadcast licenses obtained through the Federal Radio Commission (FRC), a government entity that was created in 1926 to regulate the radio industry. With some exceptions, radio stations east of the Mississippi River received official call signs beginning with the letter "W"; those west of the Mississippi were assigned calls beginning with a "K". The number of programs that these early stations aired was often limited, in part due to the expense of program creation. The idea of a network system which would distribute programming to many stations simultaneously, saving each station the expense of creating all of their own programs and expandingus transmitted from station to station to listeners across the United States. Other companies, including CBS and the Mutual Broadcasting System, soon followed suit, each network signed hundreds of individual stations on as affiliates: stations which agreed to broadcast programs from one of the networks.

As radio prospered throughout the 1920s and 1930s, experimental television stations, which broadcast both an audio and a video signal, began sporadic broadcasts. Licenses for these experimental stations were often granted to experienced radio broadcasters, and thus advances in television technology closely followed breakthroughs in radio technology. As interest in television grew, and as early television stations began regular broadcasts, the idea of networking television signals (sending one station's video and audio signal to outlying stations) was born. However, the signal from an electronic television system, containing much more information than a radio signal, required a broadband transmission medium. Transmission by a nationwide series of radio relay towers would be possible but extremely expensive.

Researchers at AT&T subsidiary Bell Telephone Laboratories patented coaxial cable in 1929, primarily as a telephone improvement device. Its high capacity (transmitting 240 telephone calls simultaneously) also made it ideal for long-distance television transmission, where it could handle a frequency band of 1 MHz. German television first demonstrated such an application in 1936 by relaying televised telephone calls from Berlin to Leipzig, 180 km (110 mi) away, by cable.

AT&T laid the first L-carrier coaxial cable between New York City and Philadelphia, with automatic signal booster stations every 10 miles (16 km), and in 1937 it experimented with transmitting televised motion pictures over the line. Bell Labs gave demonstrations of the New York–Philadelphia television link in 1940 and 1941. AT&T used the coaxial link to transmit the Republican National Convention in June 1940 from Philadelphia to New York City, where it was televised to a few hundred receivers over the NBC station W2XBS (which evolved into WNBC) as well as seen in Schenectady, New York via W2XB (which evolved into WRGB) via off-air relay from the New York station.

NBC had earlier demonstrated an inter-city television broadcast on 1 February 1940, from its station in New York City to another in Schenectady, New York by General Electric relay antennas, and began transmitting some programs on an irregular basis to Philadelphia and Schenectady in 1941. Wartime priorities suspended the manufacture of television and radio equipment for civilian use from 1 April 1942 to 1 October 1945, temporarily shutting down expansion of television networking. However, in 1944 a short film, "Patrolling the Ether", was broadcast simultaneously over three stations as an experiment.

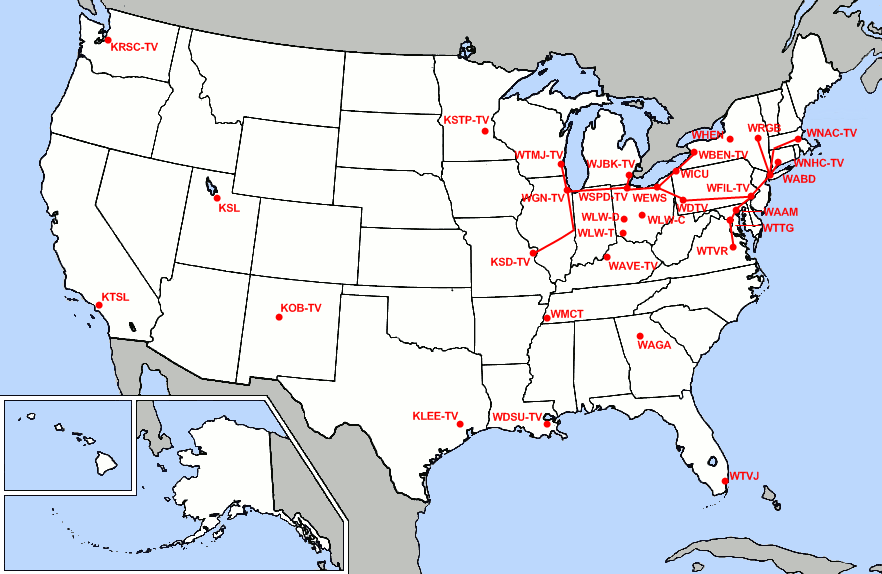
The DuMont Television Network in 1949. DuMont's network of stations stretched from Boston to St. Louis. These stations were linked together via AT&T's coaxial cable feed, allowing the network to broadcast live television programming to all the stations at the same time. Stations not yet connected received kinescope recordings via physical delivery.

AT&T made its first postwar addition in February 1946, with the completion of a 225-mile (362 km) cable between New York City and Washington, D.C., although a blurry demonstration broadcast showed that it would not be in regular use for several months. The DuMont Television Network, which had begun experimental broadcasts before the war, launched what Newsweek called "the country's first permanent commercial television network" on 15 August 1946, connecting New York City with Washington. Not to be outdone, NBC launched what it called "the world's first regularly operating television network" on 27 June 1947, serving New York City, Philadelphia, Schenectady and Washington. Baltimore and Boston were added to the NBC television network in late 1947. DuMont and NBC would be joined by CBS and ABC in 1948.

In the 1940s, the term "chain broadcasting" was used when discussing network broadcasts, as the television stations were linked together in long chains along the East Coast. But as the television networks expanded westward, the interconnected television stations formed major networks of connected affiliate stations. In January 1949, with the sign-on of DuMont's WDTV in Pittsburgh, the Midwest and East Coast networks were finally connected by coaxial cable (with WDTV airing the best shows from all four networks). By 1951, the four networks stretched from coast to coast, carried on the new microwave radio relay network of AT&T Long Lines. Only a few local television stations remained independent of the networks.

Each of the four major television networks originally only broadcast a few hours of programs a week to their affiliate stations, mostly between 8:00 and 11:00 p.m. Eastern Time, when most viewers were watching television. Most of the programs broadcast by the television stations were still locally produced. As the networks increased the number of programs that they aired, however, officials at the Federal Communications Commission (FCC) grew concerned that local television might disappear altogether. Eventually, the federal regulator enacted the Prime Time Access Rule, which restricted the amount of time that the networks could air programs; officials hoped that the rules would foster the development of quality local programs, but in practice, most local stations did not want to bear the burden of producing many of their own programs, and instead chose to purchase programs from independent producers. Sales of television programs to individual local stations are done through a method called "broadcast syndication", and today nearly every television station in the United States obtains syndicated programs in addition to network-produced fare.

Late in the 20th century, cross-country microwave radio relays were replaced by fixed-service satellites. Some terrestrial radio relays remained in service for regional connections.

After the failure and shutdown of DuMont in 1956, several attempts at new networks were made between the 1950s and the 1970s, with little success. The Fox Broadcasting Company, founded by the Rupert Murdoch-owned News Corporation (now owned by Fox Corporation), was launched on 9 October 1986 after the company purchased the television assets of Metromedia; it would eventually ascend to the status of the fourth major network by 1994. Two other networks launched within a week of one another in January 1995: The WB Television Network, a joint venture between Time Warner and the Tribune Company, and the United Paramount Network (UPN), formed through a programming alliance between Chris-Craft Industries and Paramount Television (whose parent, Viacom, would later acquire half and later all of the network over the course of its existence). In September 2006, The CW was launched as a "merger" of The WB and UPN (in actuality, a consolidation of each respective network's higher-rated programs onto one schedule); MyNetworkTV, a network formed from affiliates of UPN and The WB that did not affiliate with The CW, launched at the same time.

=== Regulation ===
FCC regulations in the United States restricted the number of television stations that could be owned by any one network, company or individual. This led to a system where most local television stations were independently owned, but received programming from the network through a franchising contract, except in a few major cities that had owned-and-operated stations (O&O) of a network and independent stations. In the early days of television, when there were often only one or two stations broadcasting in a given market, the stations were usually affiliated with multiple networks and were able to choose which programs would air. Eventually, as more stations were licensed, it became common for each station to be exclusively affiliated with only one network and carry all of the "prime-time" programs that the network offered. Local stations occasionally break from regularly scheduled network programming however, especially when a breaking news or severe weather situation occurs in the viewing area. Moreover, when stations return to network programming from commercial breaks, station identifications are displayed in the first few seconds before switching to the network's logo.

== Canada ==
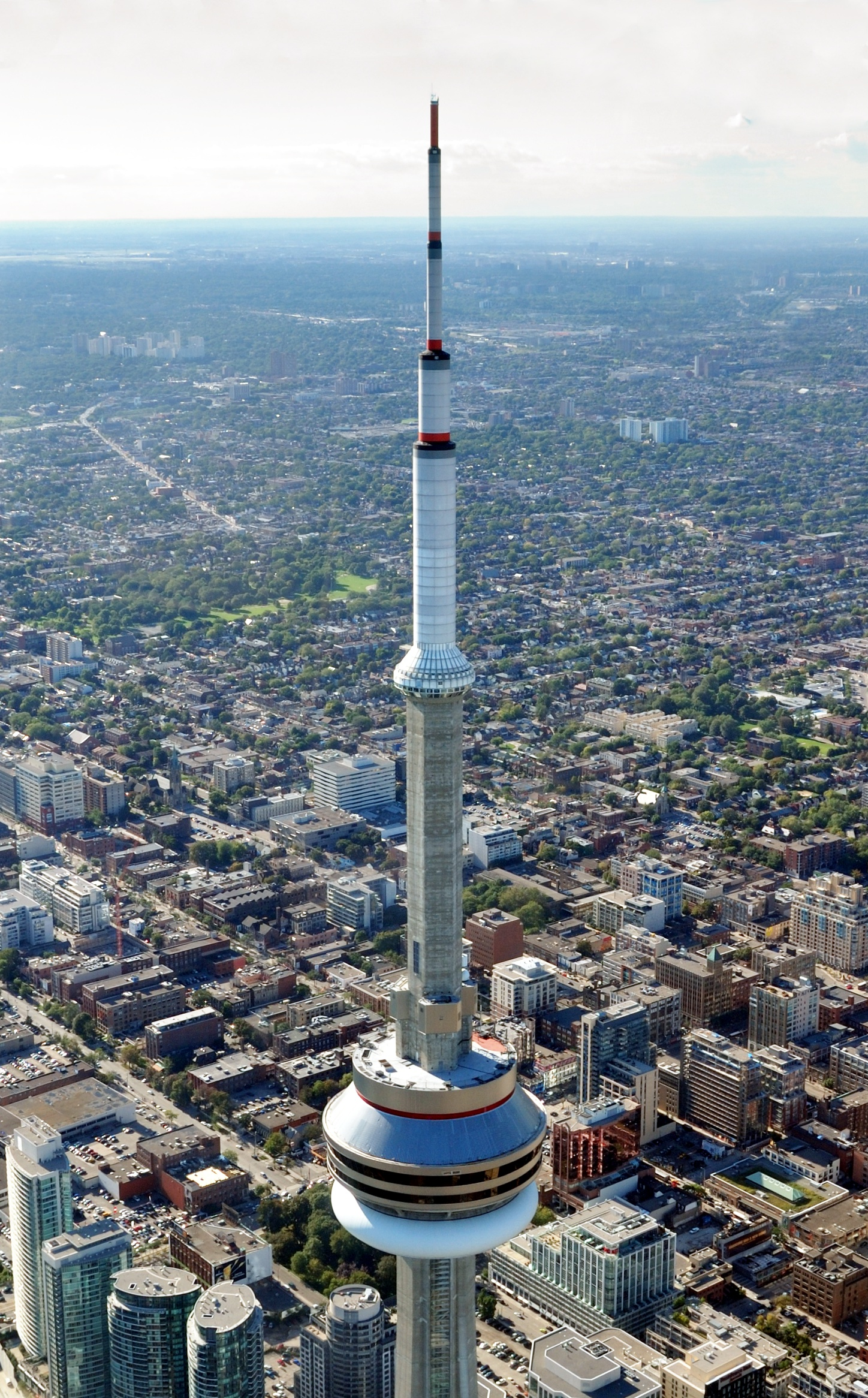
CN Tower in Toronto with antennas for broadcasting television and radio

A number of different definitions of "network" are used by government agencies, industry, and the general public. Under the Broadcasting Act, a network is defined as "any operation where control over all or any part of the programs or program schedules of one or more broadcasting undertakings is delegated to another undertaking or person", and must be licensed by the Canadian Radio-television and Telecommunications Commission (CRTC).

Only three national over-the-air television networks are currently licensed by the CRTC: government-owned CBC Television (English) and Ici Radio-Canada Télé (French), French-language private network TVA, and APTN, a network focused on Indigenous peoples in Canada. A third French-language service, Noovo (formerly V), is licensed as a provincial network within Quebec, but is not licensed or locally distributed (outside of carriage on the digital tiers of pay television providers) on a national basis.

Currently, licensed national or provincial networks must be carried by all cable providers (in the country or province, respectively) with a service area above a certain population threshold, as well as all satellite providers. However, they are no longer necessarily expected to achieve over-the-air coverage in all areas (APTN, for example, only has terrestrial coverage in parts of northern Canada).

In addition to these licensed networks, the two main private English-language over-the-air services, CTV and Global, are also generally considered to be "networks" by virtue of their national coverage, although they are not officially licensed as such. CTV was previously a licensed network, but relinquished this license in 2001 after acquiring most of its affiliates, making operating a network license essentially redundant (per the above definition).

Smaller groups of stations with common branding are often categorized by industry watchers as television systems, although the public and the broadcasters themselves will often refer to them as "networks" regardless. Some of these systems, such as CTV 2 and the now-defunct E!, essentially operate as mini-networks, but have reduced geographical coverage. Others, such as Omni Television or the Crossroads Television System, have similar branding and a common programming focus, but schedules may vary significantly from one station to the next. Citytv originally began operating as a television system in 2002 when CKVU-TV in Vancouver started to carry programs originating from CITY-TV in Toronto and adopted that station's "Citytv" branding, but gradually became a network by virtue of national coverage through expansions into other markets west of Atlantic Canada between 2005 and 2013.

Most local television stations in Canada are now owned and operated directly by their network, with only a small number of stations still operating as affiliates.

== Europe, Asia, Africa and South America ==
Most television services outside North America are national networks, some of them established by publicly funded broadcasters, and others by commercial broadcasters. Most nations established television networks in a similar way: the first television service in each country was operated by a public broadcaster, often funded by a television licensing fee, and most of them later established a second or even third station providing a greater variety of content. Commercial television services also became available when private companies applied for television broadcasting licenses. Often, each new network would be identified with their channel number, so that individual stations would often be numbered "One", "Two", "Three" and so forth.

=== United Kingdom ===
The first television network in the United Kingdom was operated by the British Broadcasting Corporation (BBC). On 2 November 1936 the BBC opened the world's first regular high-definition television service, from a 405 lines transmitter at Alexandra Palace. The BBC remained dominant until eventually on 22 September 1955, commercial broadcasting was established to create a second television network. Rather than creating a single network with local channels owned and operated by a single company (as is the case with the BBC), each local area had a separate television channel that was independently owned and operated, although most of these channels shared a number of programmes, particularly during peak evening viewing hours. These channels formed the ITV network.

When the advent of UHF broadcasting allowed a greater number of television channels to broadcast, the BBC launched a second channel, BBC2 (with the original service being renamed BBC1). A second national commercial network was launched Channel 4, although Wales instead introduced a Welsh-language service, S4C. These were later followed by the launch of a third commercial network, Channel 5. Since the introduction of digital television, the BBC, ITV, Channel 4 and Channel 5 each introduced a number of digital-only channels. Sky operates a large number of channels, as does UKTV.

=== Sweden ===
Sweden had only one television network from 1956 until the early-1990s: the public broadcaster Sveriges Television (SVT). Commercial companies such as Modern Times Group, TV4, Viasat, and SBS Discovery have established TV networks since the 1980s although they initially aired exclusively on satellite. In 1991, TV4 became Sweden's first commercial television network to air terrestrially. Most television programming in Sweden is centralised except for local news updates that air on SVT2 and TV4.

=== Netherlands ===
Until 1989, the Dutch public broadcasting system was the only television network in the Netherlands, with three stations, Nederland 1, Nederland 2 and Nederland 3. Rather than having a single production arm, there are a number of public broadcasting organizations in this system that create programming for each of the three stations, each working relatively independently. Since 1989, there is also commercial broadcasting in the Netherlands, currently operated by two networks, RTL Nederland and Talpa TV, which together own ten commercial stations.

=== Italy ===
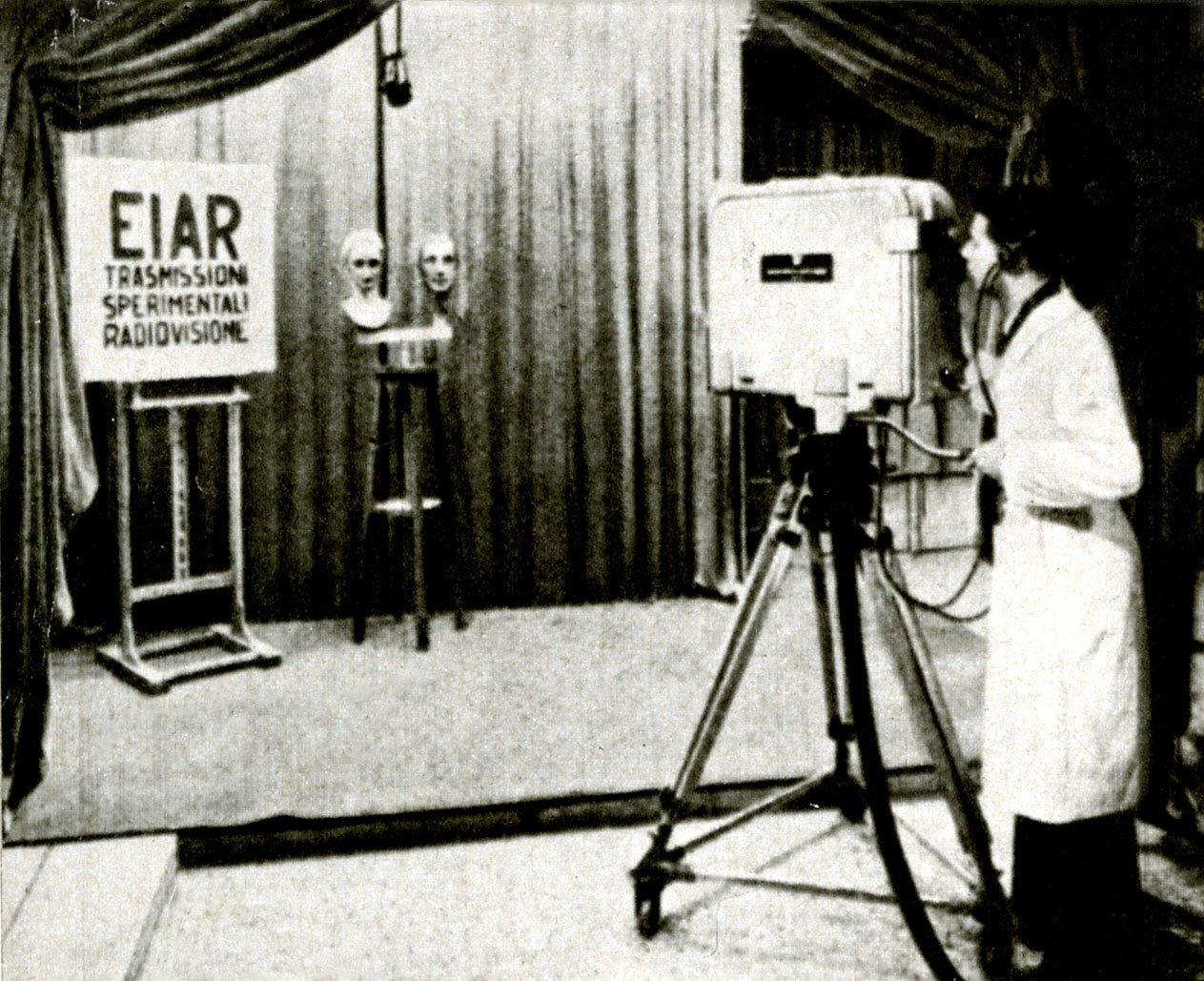
EIAR studio for experimental television transmissions, in 1939.

After some early tests in the 1930s, Italy experimented first regular electronic television transmissions from July 1939 to May 1940, through the state-owned EIAR. After the war, the state-owned RAI was established and regular transmissions began on 3 January 1954. At the end of the 1970s, local private television networks began broadcasting, among which the ones from Silvio Berlusconi's Fininvest emerged in the 1980s, creating a holding that controls three major channels (Rete 4, Canale 5 and Italia 1), opposed still today to the three ones from the RAI itself.

=== Russia ===
==== Soviet era ====
The first television network in the Soviet Union launched on 7 July 1938 when Petersburg – Channel 5 of Leningrad Television became a unionwide network. The second television network in the Soviet Union launched on 22 March 1951 when Channel One of USSR Central Television became a unionwide network. Until 1989, there were six television networks, all owned by the USSR Gosteleradio. This changed during Mikhail Gorbachev's Perestroika program, when the first independent television network, 2×2, was launched.

==== 1990s ====
Following the breakup of the Soviet Union, USSR Gosteleradio ceased to exist as well as its six networks. Only Channel One had a smooth transition and survived as a network, becoming Ostankino Channel One. The other five networks were operated by Ground Zero. This free airwave space allowed many private television networks like NTV and TV-6 to launch in the mid-1990s.

==== 2000s ====
The 2000s were marked by the increased state intervention in Russian television. On 14 April 2001 NTV experienced management changes following the expulsion of former oligarch and NTV founder Vladimir Gusinsky. As a result, most of the prominent reporters featured on NTV left the network. Later on 22 January 2002, the second largest private television network TV-6, where the former NTV staff took refuge, was shut down allegedly because of its editorial policy. Five months later on 1 June, TVS was launched, mostly employing NTV/TV-6 staff, only to cease operations the following year. Since then, the four largest television networks (Channel One, Russia 1, NTV and Russia 2) have been state-owned.

Still, the 2000s saw a rise of several independent television networks such as REN (its coverage increased vastly allowing it to become a federal network), Petersburg – Channel Five (overall the same), the relaunched 2×2. The Russian television market is mainly shared today by five major companies: Channel One, Russia 1, NTV, TNT and CTC.

=== Brazil ===
The major commercial television network in Brazil is TV Globo, which was founded in 1965. It grew to become the largest and most successful media conglomerate in the country, having a dominating presence in various forms of media including television, radio, print (newspapers and magazines) and the Internet.

Other networks include Band, Record, SBT, RedeTV!, TV Cultura, and TV Brasil.

== Australia ==
Australia has two national public networks, ABC Television and SBS. The ABC operates eight stations as part of its main network ABC TV, one for each state and territory, as well as three digital-only networks, ABC Kids / ABC TV Plus, ABC Me and ABC News. SBS currently operates six stations, SBS, SBS Viceland, SBS World Movies, SBS Food, NITV and SBS WorldWatch.

The first commercial networks in Australia involved commercial stations that shared programming in Sydney, Melbourne, Brisbane, Adelaide and later Perth, with each network forming networks based on their allocated channel numbers: TCN-9 in Sydney, GTV-9 in Melbourne, QTQ-9 in Brisbane, NWS-9 in Adelaide and STW-9 in Perth together formed the Nine Network; while their equivalents on VHF channels 7 and 10 respectively formed the Seven Network and Network 10. Until 1989, areas outside these main cities had access to only a single commercial station, and these rural stations often formed small networks such as Prime Television. Beginning in 1989, however, television markets in rural areas began to aggregate, allowing these rural networks to broadcast over a larger area, often an entire state, and become full-time affiliates to one specific metropolitan network.

As well as these free-to-air channels, there are others on Australia's Pay television network Foxtel.

== New Zealand ==
New Zealand has one public network, Television New Zealand (TVNZ), which consists of two main networks: TVNZ 1 is the network's flagship network which carries news, current affairs and sports programming as well as the majority of the locally produced shows broadcast by TVNZ and imported shows. TVNZ's second network, TV2, airs mostly imported shows with some locally produced programs such as Shortland Street. TVNZ also operates a network exclusive to pay television services, TVNZ Heartland, available on providers such as Sky. TVNZ previously operated a non-commercial public service network, TVNZ 7, which ceased operations in June 2012 and was replaced by the timeshift channel TV One Plus 1. The network operated by Television New Zealand has progressed from operating as four distinct local stations within the four main centers in the 1960s, to having the majority of the content produced from TVNZ's Auckland studios at present.

New Zealand also has several privately owned television networks with the largest being operated by MediaWorks. MediaWorks' flagship network is TV3, which competes directly with both TVNZ broadcast networks. MediaWorks also operates a second network, FOUR, which airs mostly imported programmes with children's shows airing in the daytime and shows targeted at teenagers and adult between 15 and 39 years of age during prime time. MediaWorks also operates a timeshift network, TV3 + 1, and a 24-hour music network, C4.

All television networks in New Zealand air the same programming across the entire country with the only regional deviations being for local advertising; a regional news service existed in the 1980s, carrying a regional news programme from TVNZ's studios in New Zealand's four largest cities, Auckland, Wellington, Christchurch and Dunedin.

In the 1960s, the service operated at the time by the New Zealand Broadcasting Corporation was four separate television stations – AKTV2 in Auckland, WNTV1 in Wellington, CHTV3 in Christchurch and DNTV2 in Dunedin – which each ran their own newscast and produced some in-house programmes, with other shows being shared between the stations. Programmes and news footage were distributed via mail, with a programme airing in one region being mailed to another region for broadcast the following week. A network was finally established in 1969, with the same programmes being relayed to all regions simultaneously. From the 1970s to the 1990s, locally produced programmes that aired on TV One and TV2 were produced out of one of the four main studios, with TVNZ's network hub based in Wellington. Today, most locally produced programmes that are aired by both TVNZ and other networks are not actually produced in-house, instead they are often produced by a third party company (for example, the TV2 programme Shortland Street is produced by South Pacific Pictures). The networks produce their own news and current affairs programs, with most of the content filmed in Auckland.

New Zealand also operates several regional television stations, which are only available in individual markets. The regional stations will typically air a local news programme, produce some shows in-house and cover local sports events; the majority of programming on the regional stations will be imported from various sources.

== Philippines ==
In the Philippines, in practice, the terms "network", "station" and "channel" are used interchangeably as programming lineups are mostly centrally planned from the networks' main offices, and since provincial/regional stations usually just relay the broadcast from their parent network's flagship station (usually based in the Mega Manila area). As such, networks made up of VHF stations are sometimes informally referred to by their over-the-air channel number in the Mega Manila area (for example, Channel 4 or Kwatro for People's Television Network, Channel 2 or Dos for ABS-CBN, Channel 9 or Nueve for Radio Philippines Network, Channel 7 or Siyete for GMA Network, Channel 13 or Trese for IBC and Channel 5 or Singko for TV5), while some incorporate their channel numbers in the network's name (for example, TV5, Studio 23 and Net 25, which respectively broadcast on VHF channel 5, and UHF channels 23 and 25).

Unlike the United States, where networks receive programmes produced by various production companies, the two largest networks in the Philippines produce all of their prime time programmes. Other networks adopt block-time programming, which uses programming arrangements similar to the relationship between a U.S. network and station.

== See also ==
- Broadcast network
- Cable television in the United States
- Concentration of media ownership
- List of television networks by country
- Holding company
- Skypath
- Television system
