= Sleep, My Love =

1948 film by Douglas Sirk

- Theatrical release poster
- Directed by: Douglas Sirk
- Screenplay by: St. Clair McKelway; Leo Rosten; Decla Dunning
- Based on: Sleep, My Love by Leo Rosten
- Produced by: Ralph Cohn; Mary Pickford; Charles Rogers
- Starring: Claudette Colbert; Robert Cummings; Don Ameche
- Cinematography: Joseph A. Valentine
- Edited by: Lynn Harrison
- Music by: Rudy Schrager
- Production company: Triangle Productions
- Distributed by: United Artists
- Release dates: January 12, 1948 (Ottawa); January 27, 1948 (Los Angeles)
- Running time: 97 minutes
- Country: United States
- Language: English

Sleep, My Love is a 1948 American noir film directed by Douglas Sirk and starring Claudette Colbert, Robert Cummings and Don Ameche. Adapted from the serialized novel of the same name by Leo Rosten, it follows a chronic sleepwalker (Colbert) who comes to believe a mysterious man is attempting to murder her. The film was co-produced by Mary Pickford. It has been called "a gaslighting thriller."

== Plot ==
Alison Courtland, a wealthy New Yorker, awakens on a train bound for Boston with no memory of how she got there. When she phones her husband, Richard, the police listen in and overhear that she had threatened him with a gun. On a flight home, fellow passenger Bruce Elcott is attracted to Alison. Elcott, it turns out, knows one of her good friends.

Back home, Richard makes Alison agree to start seeing a psychiatrist, Dr. Rhinehart. However, the 'doctor' who shows up at the house for their first appointment is not Rhinehart, but Charles Vernay, a photographer hired by Richard, who is having an affair with another woman, Daphne, and hopes to get rid of Alison for good.

Richard's scheme is to drive Alison to suicide and thus inherit her wealth. Elcott, who has come to suspect there is some kind of purposeful plan afoot to confuse and distress Alison, arrives just in time to find her, apparently under hypnosis, about to leap from a balcony to her death. Elcott discovers Vernay's role in the situation. Richard, meanwhile, attempts to drug Alison and make her kill the doctor herself.

Vernay realizes he has been betrayed and shoots Richard; Vernay is later killed by falling through a skylight while being chased by Elcott, after which Elcott and Alison are able to be together in peace.

== Cast ==
- Claudette Colbert as Alison Courtland
- Robert Cummings as Bruce Elcott
- Don Ameche as Richard Courtland
- Rita Johnson as Barby
- George Coulouris as Charles Vernay
- Queenie Smith as Mrs. Grace Vernay
- Ralph Morgan as Dr. Rhinehart
- Keye Luke as Jimmie Lin
- Fred Nurney as Haskins
- Raymond Burr as Detective Sgt. Strake
- Hazel Brooks as Daphne
- Edgar Dearing as Hannigan (uncredited)

== Production ==
Screen rights for the story, which was written by Leo Rosten and had been serialized in magazines, were purchased by Triangle Productions in November 1946. Rosten wrote the first screenplay but The New Yorker writer St. Clair McKelway was recruited to contribute to the final version.

The film was produced by Mary Pickford, her husband Buddy Rogers and Ralph Cohn. It was Pickford's first film activity in 12 years since The Gay Desperado (1936), although Cohn and Rogers had produced films for Comet Productions. Pickford was involved in approving the cast and script.

In December 1946, the production company approached Richard Ney to head the cast. In April 1947, Don Ameche was signed as the star and Douglas Sirk agreed to direct before Claudette Colbert and Robert Cummings were added to the cast.

Filming began on May 27, 1947 at the Hal Roach Studios in Los Angeles.

== Release ==
Sleep, My Love premiered in Ottawa, Canada on January 12, 1948 as a benefit to help children in Europe. Mary Pickford was in attendance and delivered a speech about the plight of the children. The film opened in Los Angeles on January 27, 1948.

=== Home media ===
Olive Films released Sleep, My Love on Blu-ray on April 15, 2014.

== Reception ==
In a contemporary review for The New York Times, critic A. H. Weiler wrote:

As the latest arrival on an extremely long line of psychological melodramas, "Sleep, My Love" is a sleek entry which manages to run its course without coming a cropper. An intelligent script, facilely handled, for the most part, helps matters along but a general lack of suspense, familiar plot and somewhat uneven direction keep "Sleep, My Love" ... a fairly obvious chapter in cinema psychology. Whether the hypnotic procedures used by the producers will gratify the Adler, Jung and Freud schools or give those professional gentlemen an aggravated anxiety neurosis, is hard to say. ... "Sleep, My Love" can be marked down as a generally competent job which has its absorbing moments but which hasn't strayed much from the norm.

Variety's review concluded: "Sleep, My Love manages a fair share of suspense and adds up to okay melodrama. Plot gets off to a strong start and windup is high melodrama that brings off the finale on a fast note."

== See also ==
- Gothic romance film
- Gaslighting
