= Wayne Morris =

American actor and World War II flying ace (1914–1959)

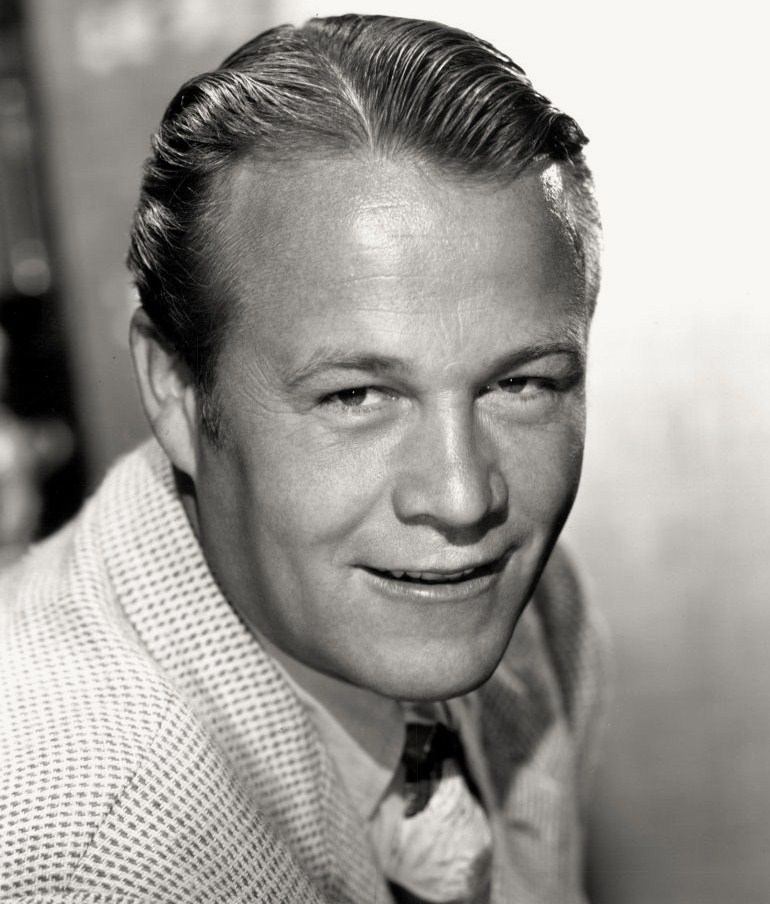
- Morris in 1948
- Born: Bert DeWayne Morris Jr. February 17, 1914; Los Angeles, California, U.S.
- Died: September 14, 1959 (aged 45); Aboard USS Bon Homme Richard
- Resting place: Arlington National Cemetery
- Occupation: Actor
- Years active: 1936–1959
- Spouses: Leonora Hornblow (m. 1939; div. 1940) Patricia Ann O'Rourke (m. 1942)

Wayne Morris (born Bert DeWayne Morris Jr. February 17, 1914 – September 14, 1959) was an American film and television actor, as well as a decorated World War II fighter ace. He appeared in many films, including Paths of Glory (1957), The Bushwackers (1952), and the title role of Kid Galahad (1937).

== Early life and career ==
Morris was born in Los Angeles County, California, to Bert DeWayne Morris and Anna Lorea Morris (née Fitzgerald). He attended Los Angeles City College and was a fullback on that school's varsity football team. He gained acting experience through his work at the Pasadena Playhouse.

His film debut was in the China Clipper (1936). He played the title character of Kid Galahad (1937), a story of a young prizefighter that featured some of Hollywood's biggest stars, Bette Davis, Edward G. Robinson and Humphrey Bogart. His career flourished in films like Brother Rat, which starred Ronald Reagan, and in Bogart's only horror film, The Return of Doctor X (1939).

== Military service ==
While filming Flight Angels (1940), Morris became interested in flying and became a pilot. With war in the wind, he joined the United States Naval Reserve and became a United States Navy aviator in 1942, leaving his film career behind for the duration of World War II.

Morris was considered by the Navy as physically 'too big' to fly fighters. After being turned down several times as a fighter pilot, he went to his uncle-in-law, Commander David McCampbell, imploring him for the chance to fly fighters. McCampbell said "Give me a letter." He flew the F6F Hellcat off the aircraft carrier USS Essex with Fighter Squadron 15 (VF-15), the famed "McCampbell Heroes."

A December 15, 1944, Associated Press news story reported that Morris was "credited with 57 aerial sorties, shooting down seven Japanese Zeros, sinking an escort vessel and an antiaircraft gunboat and helping sink a submarine and damage a heavy cruiser and a minelayer." He was awarded four Distinguished Flying Crosses and two Air Medals.

== Later career ==
After the war, Morris returned to films, but his nearly four-year absence had cost him his burgeoning stardom. He continued to act in movies, but the pictures, for the most part, sank in quality. Losing his boyish looks but not demeanor, Morris spent much of the 1950s in low-budget westerns, but also appeared as the cowardly Lieutenant Roget, one of the main characters, in Stanley Kubrick's Paths of Glory (1957).

In 1957, Morris made his Broadway debut as a washed-up boxing champ in William Saroyan's The Cave Dwellers.

On television, Morris starred in a 1956 episode of Science Fiction Theater, "Beam of Fire". In 1958, Morris appeared in Gunsmoke as "Nat", a groom almost shot to death. Wayne Morris played "Captain Hathaway" in 1959 on The Adventures of Ozzie and Harriet (in the episode "The Sea Captain"), and posthumously as Sheriff Sam Cloggett in 1960 on New Comedy Showcase (in the episode "They Went Thataway").

== Personal life ==
Morris was first married to tobacco heiress Leonora (Bubbles) Schinasi; the couple later divorced. Eighteen months later, Morris married the 19-year-old Patricia Ann O'Rourke at the Long Beach, California Naval Air Base February 25, 1942. He had two daughters and a son.

== Death ==
Aged 45, Morris died of a coronary occlusion on September 14, 1959, aboard the attack aircraft carrier USS Bon Homme Richard.

== Awards and decorations ==
During his naval service, Morris earned the following decorations:

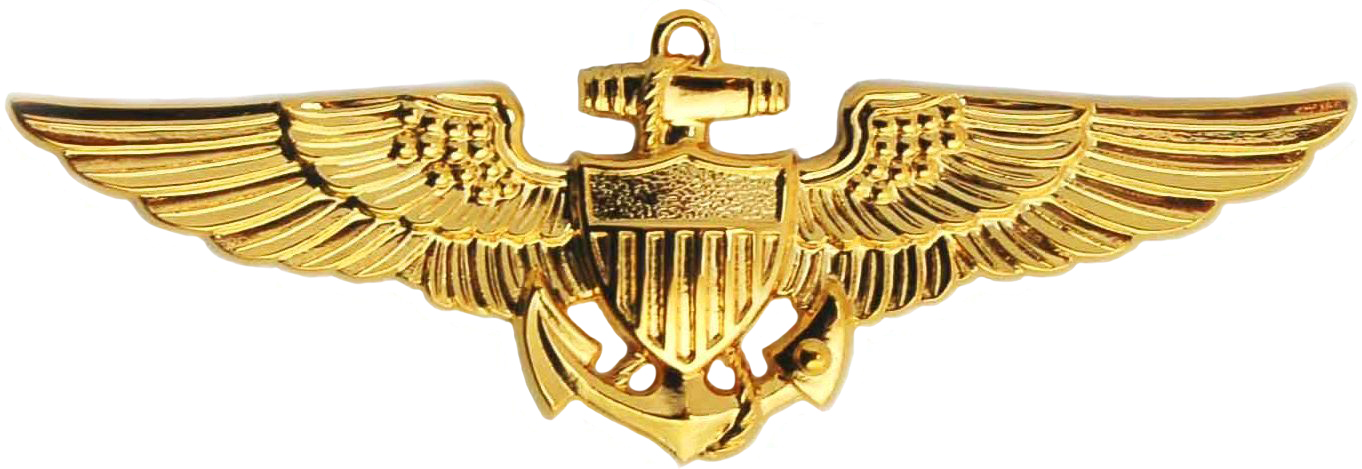

Naval Aviator Badge
Distinguished Flying Cross w/ three 5/16" Gold Stars
Air Medal w/ one 5/16" Gold Star	Navy Presidential Unit Citation	American Defense Service Medal
American Campaign Medal	Asiatic-Pacific Campaign Medal w/ three 3/16" Bronze Stars	World War II Victory Medal
Armed Forces Reserve Medal w/ Bronze Hourglass Device	Philippine Presidential Unit Citation	Philippine Liberation Medal w/ two 3/16" Bronze Stars

== Filmography ==
- China Clipper (1936) as Navigator on Clipper
- Here Comes Carter (1936) as Bill
- Polo Joe (1936) as Spectator (uncredited)
- King of Hockey (1936) as Bill 'Jumbo' Mullins
- Smart Blonde (1937) as Railroad Information Clerk (uncredited)
- Once a Doctor (1937) as Sailor on 'Nirvana' (uncredited)
- Land Beyond the Law (1937) as Dave Massey (Credits) / Dave Seymour
- Kid Galahad (1937) as Ward Guisenberry / Kid Galahad
- The Kid Comes Back (1937) as Rush Conway
- Submarine D-1 (1937) as 'Sock' McGillis
- Love, Honor and Behave (1938) as Ted Painter
- Men Are Such Fools (1938) as Jimmy Hall
- Valley of the Giants (1938) as Bill Cardigan
- Brother Rat (1938) as Billy Randolph
- The Kid from Kokomo (1939) as Homer Baston
- The Return of Doctor X (1939) as Walter Garrett
- Brother Rat and a Baby (1940) as Billy Randolph
- Double Alibi (1940) as Stephen Wayne
- An Angel from Texas (1940) as Mac McClure
- Flight Angels (1940) as Artie Dixon
- Gambling on the High Seas (1940) as Jim Carter
- Ladies Must Live (1940) as Corey Lake
- The Quarterback (1940) as Jimmy Jones and Billy Jones
- I Wanted Wings (1941) as Tom Cassidy
- Bad Men of Missouri (1941) as Bob Younger
- Three Sons o' Guns (1941) as Charley Patterson
- The Smiling Ghost (1941) as Lucky Downing
- Deep Valley (1947) as Jeff Barker
- The Voice of the Turtle (1947) as Comm. Ned Burling
- The Time of Your Life (1948) as Tom (Joe's stooge and friend)
- The Big Punch (1948) as Chris Thorgenson
- John Loves Mary (1949) as Lieutenant Victor O'Leary
- A Kiss in the Dark (1949) as Bruce Arnold
- The Younger Brothers (1949) as Cole Younger
- Task Force (1949) as McKinney
- The House Across the Street (1949) as Dave Joslin
- Johnny One-Eye (1950) as Dane Cory
- The Tougher They Come (1950) as Bill Shaw
- Stage to Tucson (1950) as Barney Broderick
- Sierra Passage (1950) as Johnny Yorke
- The Big Gusher (1951) as Kenny Blake
- Yellow Fin (1951) as Mike Donovan
- The Bushwhackers (1951) as Marshal John Harding
- Desert Pursuit (1952) as Ford Smith
- Arctic Flight (1952) as Mike Wien
- Star of Texas (1953) as Texas Ranger Ed Ryan / Robert Larkin
- The Marksman (1953) as Deputy Marshal Mike Martin
- Fighting Lawman (1953) as Deputy Marshal Jim Burke
- Texas Bad Man (1953) as Walt
- Riding Shotgun (1954) as Deputy Sheriff Tub Murphy
- The Desperado (1954) as Sam Garrett
- The Master Plan (1954) as Major Thomas Brent
- Two Guns and a Badge (1954) as Deputy Jim Blake
- The Green Carnation (1954) as Gary Holden
- Port of Hell (1954) as Stanley Povich
- Lord of the Jungle (1955) as Jeff Wood
- The Lonesome Trail (1955) as Dandy Dayton
- Cross Channel (1955) as Tex Parker
- The Gelignite Gang (1956) as Jimmy Baxter
- The Crooked Sky (1957) as Mike Conlin
- Paths of Glory (1957) as Lieutenant Roget
- Plunder Road (1957) as Commando Munson
- Official Detective (1958, Episode: "The Cover-Up") as Holmes
- Alfred Hitchcock Presents (1959) (Season 4 Episode 15: "A Personal Matter") as Bret Johnson
- New Comedy Showcase (1960) (Season 1 Episode 3: "They Went Thataway") as Sheriff Sam Cloggett
- Buffalo Gun (1961) as Roche (final film role)
