= Star of Texas =

1953 film by Thomas Carr

- Directed by: Thomas Carr
- Written by: Daniel B. Ullman
- Produced by: Vincent M. Fennelly
- Starring: Wayne Morris; Paul Fix; Frank Ferguson
- Cinematography: Ernest Miller
- Edited by: Sam Fields
- Music by: Raoul Kraushaar
- Production company: Allied Artists Pictures
- Distributed by: Allied Artists Pictures
- Release date: January 11, 1953
- Running time: 68 minutes
- Country: United States
- Language: English

Star of Texas is a 1953 American Western film directed by Thomas Carr and starring Wayne Morris, Paul Fix and Frank Ferguson.

== Cast ==
- Wayne Morris as Texas Ranger Ed Ryan / Robert Larkin
- Paul Fix as Luke Andrews
- Frank Ferguson as Marshal Bullock
- Rick Vallin as Texas Ranger William Vance
- Jack Larson as Henchman John Jenkins
- James Flavin as Texas Rangers Capt. Sturdivant
- William Fawcett as Soapy
- Robert Bice as Henchman Al Slade
- Mickey Simpson as Henchman Tom Traynor
- George Wallace as Clampett
- John Crawford as Texas Ranger Stockton
- Stanley Price as Hank Caldwell / James Lawrence
- Lyle Talbot as Telegraph Operator

== Bibliography ==
- Martin, Len D. The Allied Artists Checklist: The Feature Films and Short Subjects of Allied Artists Pictures Corporation, 1947-1978. McFarland & Company, 1993.
