= The Tougher They Come =

1950 film directed by Ray Nazarro

- Directed by: Ray Nazarro
- Written by: George Bricker
- Produced by: Wallace MacDonald
- Starring: Wayne Morris; Preston Foster; Kay Buckley; William Bishop; Frank McHugh
- Cinematography: Philip Tannura
- Edited by: Aaron Stell
- Production company: Columbia Pictures
- Distributed by: Columbia Pictures
- Release date: November 16, 1950
- Running time: 69 minutes
- Country: United States
- Language: English

The Tougher They Come is a 1950 American lumberjack drama film directed by Ray Nazarro, written by George Bricker and starring Wayne Morris and Preston Foster. The film was released on November 16, 1950 by Columbia Pictures.

== Plot ==
Seattle loggers Bill Shaw and Joe McKinley are friendly rivals for the hand of Helen, but she sees no future in logging until Joe reveals that he has inherited his uncle's lumber company. However, she agrees to marry because she believes that Joe will live in Chicago as his uncle did. A year passes, and the couple are still living at the logging camp, and the logging business is near bankruptcy. Helen learns that lumber magnate Thompson has offered to buy the business for a meager offer, and she insists that Joe consider it. Helen secretly visits the lumber magnate, offering to help him seal the deal with Joe.

Joe reunites with Bill in Seattle, and Joe invites him to come north with him and Helen and log for the winter. Bill is reluctant at first, but he hears that Joe's logging crew has experienced an unusual amount of accidents and he suspects that Thompson is trying to force Joe from business, and he agrees to join them. However, they do not know that Joe's foreman Gus Williams is in Thompson's pocket and was hired to sabotage Joe's operation.

Back at camp, the cook's daughter Rattle Rafferty becomes interested in Bill, but Rattle sees Helen visit Bill's cabin and believes that they are an item. The company is plagued by increasingly serious accidents, killing several workers and injuring Bill. With Rattle's help, Bill recovers, and Rattle tells him that Gus might be behind the rash of accidents, but Bill refuses to believe it. Gus encourages tensions in the camp, as he incites a fight between Bill and Joe over Helen.

Gig Rafferty is drinking in the woods and witnesses Gus setting a fire. Rafferty hurriedly calls Rattle on the phone, but Gus knocks him unconscious. Rattle and Bill hurry to Rafferty's rescue with a group of workers to extinguish the fire. Gus realizes that he is trapped and fights with Bill, who learns of his double dealings with Thompson. Back at the camp, Helen learns of Joe's peril and hurries to his aid, and Joe is rescued. Rattle and Bill marry and Joe and Helen patch their relationship, and the two couples agree to collaborate on their logging business.

== Cast ==
- Wayne Morris as Bill Shaw
- Preston Foster as Joe MacKinley
- Kay Buckley as Helen MacKinley
- William Bishop as Gus Williams
- Frank McHugh as Gig Rafferty
- Gloria Henry as Rattle Rafferty
- Mary Castle as Flo
- Joseph Crehan as Thompson
- Frank O'Connor as Mike Shepard
- Al Thompson as Tom
- Alan Bridge as Jensen
