= Body and Soul (1947 film) =

1947 film noir directed by Robert Rossen

- Theatrical release poster
- Directed by: Robert Rossen
- Written by: Abraham Polonsky
- Produced by: Bob Roberts
- Starring: John Garfield; Lilli Palmer; Hazel Brooks; Anne Revere; William Conrad
- Cinematography: James Wong Howe
- Edited by: Robert Parrish; Francis Lyon (supervising)
- Music by: Hugo Friedhofer
- Color process: Black and white
- Production company: Enterprise Productions
- Distributed by: United Artists (United States and Canada); Metro-Goldwyn-Mayer (International)
- Release date: 1947
- Running time: 104 minutes
- Country: United States
- Language: English
- Budget: $1,800,000
- Box office: $3,250,000 (US rentals) $4,700,000 (total)

Body and Soul is a 1947 American film noir sports drama directed by Robert Rossen and starring John Garfield, Lilli Palmer, Hazel Brooks, Anne Revere, and William Conrad. The screenplay by Abraham Polonsky is partly based on the 1939 film Golden Boy. With cinematography by James Wong Howe, the film is considered by some to be one of the best films about boxing. It is also a cautionary tale about the lure of money—and how it can derail even a strong common man in his pursuit of success. The film uses the song "Body and Soul" for the main musical theme and underscoring throughout.

== Premise ==
Charley Davis, against the wishes of his mother, becomes a boxer. As he becomes more successful the fighter becomes surrounded by shady characters, including an unethical promoter named Roberts, who tempts the man with a number of vices. Charley finds himself faced with increasingly difficult choices.

== Cast ==
- John Garfield as Charley Davis
- Lilli Palmer as Peg Born
- Hazel Brooks as Alice
- Anne Revere as Anna Davis
- William Conrad as Quinn
- Joseph Pevney as Shorty Polaski
- Lloyd Gough as Roberts
- Canada Lee as Ben Chaplin
- Art Smith as David Davis
- Larry Steers as Fight Spectator (uncredited)

== Reception ==
=== Critical response ===
Body and Soul was praised by critics for its performances (particularly Garfield's), boxing sequences and social commentary. When the film was released, critic Bosley Crowther praised the film, writing, "Body and Soul has up and done it, with interest and excitement to spare, and we heartily recommend it in its present exhibition at the Globe ... Still [Abraham Polonsky has] written his story with such flavor and such slashing fidelity to the cold and greedy nature of the fight game, and Robert Rossen has directed it with such an honest regard for human feelings and with such a searching and seeing camera, that any possible resemblance to other fight yarns, living or dead, may be gratefully allowed."

On the review aggregator website Rotten Tomatoes, 92% of 12 critics' reviews are positive, with an average rating of 7.6/10.

Film critic Dennis Schwartz discussed that the film had a definite sociopolitical point of view and praised Garfield's work. He, wrote, "Robert Rossen's Body and Soul becomes more than a boxing and film noir tale, as screenwriter Abraham Polonsky makes this into a socialist morality drama where the pursuit of money becomes the focus that derails the common man in his quest for success ... Garfield is seen as a victim of the ruthless capitalistic system that fixes everything including athletic events, as the little guy is always at the mercy of the big operator. It's the kind of liberalism that was common in the dramas made in the 1930s. It's more a film about corruption and the presence of violence everywhere in America rather than a straight boxing film ... Body and Soul viewed at this late date lacks much relevancy and now only seems gripping because of Garfield's gritty performance, and not because of the intense script that once made waves in powerful circles."

TV Guide comments: "The fight sequences, in particular, brought a kind of realism to the genre that had never before existed (James Wong Howe wore skates and rolled around the ring shooting the fight scenes with a hand-held camera). A knockout on all levels." Eddie Muller of the Film Noir Foundation wrote: "Polonsky called his script 'a fable from the Empire city,' and it was given vivid life by the aggressive direction of Robert Rossen, the visual poetry of cameraman James Wong Howe, and a bristling performance by Garfield."

=== Accolades ===
Award	Category	Nominee(s)	Result	Ref.
Academy Awards	Best Actor	John Garfield	Nominated	
Academy Awards	Best Original Screenplay	Abraham Polonsky	Nominated	
Academy Awards	Best Film Editing	Francis D. Lyon and Robert Parrish	Won	
New York Film Critics Circle Awards	Best Actor	John Garfield	Nominated	
Saturn Awards	Best DVD or Blu-ray Collection	Body and Soul (Note: As part of the Pioneers of African-American Cinema collection.)	Nominated	

- The film was voted as the Greatest Boxing Movie Ever in 2014 by the Houston Boxing Hall of Fame (Polonsky and Garfield, as well as Rossen, were blacklisted, essentially ruining the careers of the former two, though Rossen was reinstated after naming names in his second HUAC grilling).

The film is recognized by American Film Institute in these lists:

- 2008: AFI's 10 Top 10:
  - Nominated Sports Film

== See also ==
- List of boxing films
