= Top Gun (1955 film) =

1955 film by Ray Nazarro

- Theatrical release poster
- Directed by: Ray Nazarro
- Screenplay by: Steve Fisher; Richard Schayer
- Based on: the short story The Fastest Gun by Steve Fisher
- Produced by: Edward Small (uncredited)
- Starring: Sterling Hayden
- Cinematography: Lester White
- Edited by: Henry Adams; Dwight Caldwell
- Music by: Irving Gertz
- Production company: Fame Productions
- Distributed by: United Artists
- Release date: December 21, 1955 (Los Angeles)
- Running time: 74 minutes
- Country: United States
- Language: English

Top Gun is a 1955 American Western film directed by Ray Nazarro. The plot concerns an ex-gunslinger (Sterling Hayden) who arrives in a small town warning of an impending attack by his old gang. The film features Rod Taylor in one of his first American roles.

== Plot ==
Rick Martin returns home to Casper, Wyoming, where he is unwanted because of his reputation as a gunslinger. He does have a few friends in town, including Marshal Bat Davis and hotel owner Jim O'Hara.

As Rick visits his mother's grave, he notices a marker beside hers with his name on it; there is also an open grave, ready for him. Bat arrives and Rick informs him that an outlaw they have both ridden with in the past, Tom Quentin, and his gang of fifteen men are on the way to take what they want from Casper. Bat tells the town council this and tries to rustle up a posse. Despite Rick wanting to stay and help, the officials insist he leaves town by midnight.

Rick rides to former sweetheart Laura Mead's ranch to ask her to marry him and move to California, but she is engaged to a wealthy council member, Canby Judd.

Rick learns his mother was cheated out of her ranch by Judd and murdered by him. After a fistfight, Judd hires gunfighter Lem Sutter to ambush Rick, but when Sutter ends up dead, and Judd lies about how it happened, Bat has no choice but to place Rick under arrest. Bat tries to head off Quentin on the trail but is shot. Townspeople now beg Rick for help. He is able to kill Quentin in a fair fight, and Laura kills Judd when he is about to shoot Rick in the back. Rick and Laura pack up and leave for California.

== Cast ==
- Sterling Hayden as Rick Martin
- William Bishop as Canby Judd
- Karin Booth as Laura Mead
- James Millican as Marshal Bat Davis
- Regis Toomey as Jim O'Hara
- Hugh Sanders as Ed Marsh
- John Dehner as Tom Quentin
- Rod Taylor as Lem Sutter
- Tom London as Casey (uncredited)

== Production ==
Filming started in June 1955.

Female lead Karin Booth was married to the grandson of Allan Pinkerton—founder of the world-famous Pinkerton Detective Agency—and producer Edward Small announced plans to star her as a female Pinkerton detective, but no film seems to have resulted.

Based on the short story The Fastest Gun by Steve Fisher, the film was remade as Noose for a Gunman and The Quick Gun.

== See also ==
- List of American films of 1955
