= Gambling on the High Seas =

- Theatrical release poster
- Directed by: George Amy
- Screenplay by: Robert E. Kent
- Produced by: Bryan Foy
- Starring: Wayne Morris; Jane Wyman; Gilbert Roland; John Litel; Roger Pryor; Frank Wilcox
- Cinematography: L. William O'Connell
- Edited by: Frederick Richards
- Music by: Howard Jackson
- Production company: Warner Bros. Pictures
- Distributed by: Warner Bros. Pictures
- Release date: June 22, 1940
- Running time: 55 minutes
- Country: United States
- Language: English

Gambling on the High Seas is a 1940 American drama film remake of Special Agent (1935), directed by George Amy and written by Robert E. Kent. The film stars Wayne Morris, Jane Wyman, Gilbert Roland, John Litel, Roger Pryor and Frank Wilcox. The film was released by Warner Bros. Pictures on June 22, 1940, as a second feature.

== Plot ==
A reporter tries to implicate a gambling-ship owner for murder.

== Cast ==
- Wayne Morris as Jim Carter
- Jane Wyman as Laurie Ogden
- Gilbert Roland as Greg Morella
- John Litel as U.S. District Attorney
- Roger Pryor as Max Gates
- Frank Wilcox as Stone
- Robert Strange as Larry Brill
- John Gallaudet as Steve Sterling
- Frank Ferguson as City District Attorney
- Harry Shannon as Chief of Police
- George Reeves as Reporter
- George Meader as Secretary to City Attorney
- William Pawley as Frank
- Murray Alper as Louie
