= Gun Belt (film) =

1953 film by Ray Nazarro

- Directed by: Ray Nazarro
- Screenplay by: Jack Dewitt; Richard Schayer
- Story by: Arthur E. Orloff
- Produced by: Edward Small
- Starring: George Montgomery; Tab Hunter
- Cinematography: W. Howard Greene
- Edited by: Grant Whytock
- Music by: Irving Gertz
- Color process: Technicolor
- Production company: Global Productions
- Distributed by: United Artists
- Release date: July 24, 1953 (United States)
- Running time: 78 minutes
- Country: United States
- Language: English

Gun Belt is a 1953 American Western film directed by Ray Nazarro and starring George Montgomery and Tab Hunter.

== Plot ==
A former outlaw, Billy Ringo, clashes with his old gang. He had hung up his guns, bought a ranch and fallen in love with Arlene Reach (Helen Westcott), whom he plans to marry as soon as possible. Billy has let his nephew, Chip, live and work the ranch with him while Chip's father, Matt Ringo (John Dehner) is serving a prison sentence. Billy is determined that Chip keep on the straight and narrow.

Matt breaks out of prison and joins his three outlaw buddies - Dixon, Holloway, and Hoke - in a plan to pull a bank robbery. The plan, however, needs Billy Ringo's participation.

Billy refuses to join the robbery plot or to help his brother escape recapture. This angers Chip, who decides to join his father. An altercation occurs during which Billy accidentally kills Matt; Chip then becomes more determined to follow in his father's footsteps, as well as exact revenge upon his uncle.

Billy devises a plan to dissuade Chip and stop the gang and its devious ringleader, Ike Clinton. He arranges details with Marshal Wyatt Earp, telling him about the gang's plan to rob a Wells Fargo express wagon. A gunfight ensues at the robbery site. Chip realizes his mistake as Clinton murders his own men before he is subdued by Billy and handed over to Earp.

== Cast ==
- George Montgomery as Billy Ringo
- Tab Hunter as Chip Ringo
- Helen Westcott as Arlene Reach
- John Dehner as Matt Ringo
- William Bishop as Ike Clinton
- Jack Elam as Kolloway
- Douglas Kennedy as Dixon
- James Millican as Wyatt Earp
- Hugh Sanders as Douglas Frazer
- Bruce Cowling as Virgil Earp
- William 'Bill' Phillips as Curley
- Willis Bouchey as Endicott

== Production ==
The film was originally known as Johnny Ringo, Tombstone Trail and Screaming Eagles. Its plotline and lines are duplicated in another Edward Small production, Five Guns to Tombstone (1960).

Hunter signed in October 1952. He had a two-picture deal with Edward Small the other one being The Steel Claw. Hunter wrote "Although the script was no great shakes, I was eager to make Gun Belt because it was a western. That meant horses."

Filming started November 13, 1952, at the Goldwyn studios.

== Reception ==
Variety called it "a well made Western".
