= William Bishop (actor) =

American actor (1918–1959)

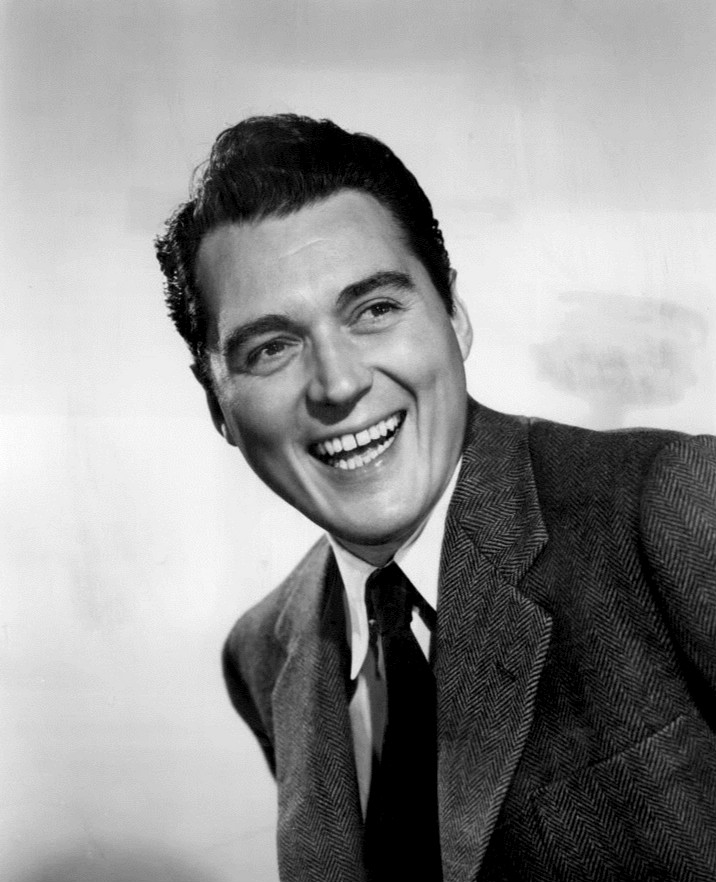
- Bishop as Rudolph Strobel in the 1949 film Anna Lucasta.
- Born: July 16, 1918; Oak Park, Illinois, U.S.
- Died: October 3, 1959 (aged 41); Malibu, California, U.S.
- Resting place: Woodlawn Memorial Cemetery, Santa Monica
- Education: West Virginia University
- Occupation: Actor
- Years active: 1943–1959
- Spouse: Shirley Mohr Bishop
- Relatives: Charles MacArthur (uncle); Helen Hayes (aunt); James MacArthur (cousin)

William Paxton Bishop (July 16, 1918 – October 3, 1959) was an American television and movie actor from Oak Park, Illinois.

== Early life ==
Bishop was the son of Edward T. Bishop and Helen MacArthur Bishop. He had a brother, Robert. His elementary and secondary schooling came in New York and New Jersey. He went to West Virginia University where he wanted to study law but left to enter theater. While he was at WVU, Bishop "won laurels as a football player and in other athletics."

His uncle was playwright Charles MacArthur, making him the nephew of stage and screen legend Helen Hayes and the cousin of actor James MacArthur.

== Military service ==
Bishop served in the South Pacific with a Signal Battalion of the United States Army during World War II.

== Stage ==
Bishop's early experiences in acting came on the stage. After some work in little theaters in New York, he appeared on Broadway in Tobacco Road. He was also a charter member of Orson Welles' Mercury Theatre.

== Television and film ==
Bishop was best known for his role as Steve Connors on the 1950s NBC comedy series It's a Great Life He was also seen in other programs, including Schlitz Playhouse of Stars and The Loretta Young Show.

He had roles in films including Harriet Craig, The Killer That Stalked New York and The Basketball Fix, plus numerous westerns such as Top Gun, The Tougher They Come, Gun Belt, Cripple Creek and Wyoming Renegades. On television he was credited as a Special Guest Star on The Rifleman S1 E38 "Outlaw's Inheritance" in the role of Dave Stafford (aired 6/15/1959).

== Personal life ==
In 1956, Bishop married Shirley Mohr "in a small Nevada town after being marooned ... by blizzard."

== Death ==
Bishop died in Malibu, California of cancer on October 3, 1959, at age 41.

== Selected filmography ==
- Pilot No. 5 (1943) - Cadet (uncredited)
- Young Ideas (1943) - French Lieutenant (uncredited)
- Salute to the Marines (1943) - Cpl. Anderson (uncredited)
- Swing Shift Maisie (1943) - Young Pilot (uncredited)
- I Dood It (1943) - Detective (uncredited)
- Soldier with Autograph Book (uncredited)
- Cry 'Havoc' (1943) - Soldier (uncredited)
- Swing Fever (1943) - Radio Man (uncredited)
- Lost Angel (1943) - Reporter (uncredited)
- A Guy Named Joe (1943) - Ray - Transport Pilot (uncredited)
- Whistling in Brooklyn (1943) - Psychiatrist (uncredited)
- The Beginning or the End (1947) - 2nd Lieutenant - Electronics Officer, Enola Gay (uncredited)
- The Romance of Rosy Ridge (1947) - Ad Buchanan
- Song of the Thin Man (1947) - Al Amboy
- Devil Ship (1947) - Sanderson
- Adventures in Silverado (1948) - Bill Foss
- Port Said (1948) - Leslie Sears
- Coroner Creek (1948) - Leach Conover
- Thunderhoof (1948) - The Kid
- Black Eagle (1948) - Jason Bond
- The Untamed Breed (1948) - Larch Keegan
- Slightly French (1949) - J.B. (voice, uncredited)
- The Walking Hills (1949) - Dave 'Shep' Wilson
- Anna Lucasta (1949) - Rudolf Strobel
- Mr. Soft Touch (1949) - Radio Broadcaster (voice, uncredited)
- The Killer That Stalked New York (1950) - Dr. Ben Wood
- Harriet Craig (1950) - Wes Miller
- The Tougher They Come (1950) - Gus Williams
- The Frogmen (1951) - Ferrino (uncredited)
- Lorna Doone (1951) - Carver Doone
- The Texas Rangers (1951) - Sam Bass
- The Basketball Fix (1951) - Mike Taft
- Montana Territory (1952) - Opening Off-Screen Narrator (uncredited)
- Cripple Creek (1952) - Silver Kirby
- Breakdown (1952) - Terry Williams
- The Raiders (1952) - Marshal William Henderson
- The Redhead from Wyoming (1953) - Jim Averell
- Gun Belt (1953) - Ike Clinton
- Overland Pacific (1954) - Del Stewart
- Wyoming Renegades (1955) - Sundance
- Top Gun (1955) - Canby Judd
- The Boss (1956) - Bob Herrick
- The White Squaw (1956) - Bob Garth
- The Phantom Stagecoach (1957) - Glen Hayden
- Short Cut to Hell (1957) - Sgt. Stan Lowery
- The Oregon Trail (1959) - Capt. George Wayne
