= The Basketball Fix =

1951 film by Felix E. Feist

- Directed by: Felix E. Feist
- Screenplay by: Peter R. Brooke; Charles K. Peck Jr.
- Story by: Charles K. Peck Jr.
- Produced by: Edward Leven (producer); Henry Spitz (associate producer)
- Starring: John Ireland; Marshall Thompson; Vanessa Brown; William Bishop; Hazel Brooks; Johnny Sands
- Cinematography: Stanley Cortez
- Edited by: Francis D. Lyon
- Music by: Raoul Kraushaar
- Production company: Jack Broder Productions
- Distributed by: Realart Pictures
- Release date: September 13, 1951 (New York City)
- Running time: 65 minutes
- Country: United States
- Language: English

The Basketball Fix is a 1951 noir sports drama film directed by Felix E. Feist and starring John Ireland, Marshall Thompson and Vanessa Brown. The film is also known by the alternative title The Big Decision in the United Kingdom. It is based on the CCNY point shaving scandal.

== Plot ==
Sports journalist Peter Ferreday tries to prevent promising college basketball player Johnny Long from becoming involved with a betting ring but is unable to stop him from shaving points during games for gambler Mike Taft.

== Cast ==
- John Ireland - Peter Ferreday
- Marshall Thompson - Johnny Long
- Vanessa Brown - Pat Judd
- William Bishop - Mike Taft
- Hazel Brooks - Lily Courtney
- John Sands - Jed Black

== Production ==
Basketball betting had existed for many years but grew during the 1940s. Since the start of college doubleheaders at Madison Square Garden in 1934 and the invention of spread betting by Charles K. McNeil around 1940, gamblers "embraced the excitement of college basketball and the financial possibilities of betting the spread". The general public considered amateur college basketball to be pure, and it was not until 1951, after multiple trials resulting from the CCNY point shaving scandal, when awareness of college basketball gambling centered in New York became widespread.

The screenplay was written by Peter R. Brooke and Charles Peck Jr. The book Basketball in America states: "This movie exploited the fascination people had with the daily media reports of the actual investigation and the subsequent trials."

== Release ==
The film was shown nationwide in 1951, including at the Palace Theatre in New York City, the Majestic Theatre in Shamokin, Pennsylvania and the Roxy Theatre in Decatur, Alabama.

== Reception ==
In a contemporary review for The New York Times, critic Oscar Godbout called the film "a curiously uneven story" and wrote: "While 'The Basketball Fix' is on the timid side, it is worth the effort put into it, and points the way to better and more constructive social comments."

== Home video ==
Alpha Video, Digiview Entertainment, and St. Clair Entertainment Group released the film on DVD.

== See also ==
- List of basketball films
