= The Marksman (1953 film) =

1953 film by Lewis D. Collins

- Directed by: Lewis D. Collins
- Written by: Daniel B. Ullman
- Produced by: Vincent M. Fennelly
- Starring: Wayne Morris; Elena Verdugo; Frank Ferguson
- Cinematography: Ernest Miller
- Edited by: Sam Fields
- Music by: Raoul Kraushaar
- Production company: Allied Artists Pictures
- Distributed by: Allied Artists Pictures
- Release date: April 12, 1953
- Running time: 62 minutes
- Country: United States
- Language: English

The Marksman is a 1953 American Western film directed by Lewis D. Collins and starring Wayne Morris, Elena Verdugo and Frank Ferguson.

== Cast ==
- Wayne Morris as Deputy Marshal Mike Martin
- Elena Verdugo as Jane Warren
- Frank Ferguson as Champ Wiley
- Rick Vallin as Leo Santee
- I. Stanford Jolley as Marshal Bob Scott
- Tom Powers as Lt. Governor Watson
- Robert Bice as henchman Kincaid
- Stanley Price as outlaw
- Russ Whiteman as rustler
- Brad Johnson as rider
- William Fawcett as freight agent
- Jack Rice as clerk
- Tim Ryan as stagecoach driver
