= The Phantom Stagecoach =

1957 film by Ray Nazarro

- Theatrical release poster
- Directed by: Ray Nazarro
- Written by: David Lang
- Produced by: Wallace MacDonald
- Starring: William Bishop; Kathleen Crowley; Richard Webb; Hugh Sanders; John Doucette; Frank Ferguson
- Cinematography: Henry Freulich
- Edited by: Edwin H. Bryant
- Production company: Columbia Pictures
- Distributed by: Columbia Pictures
- Release date: April 1, 1957
- Running time: 69 minutes
- Country: United States
- Language: English

The Phantom Stagecoach is a 1957 American Western film directed by Ray Nazarro and starring William Bishop, Kathleen Crowley, Richard Webb, Hugh Sanders, John Doucette, and Frank Ferguson. The film was released by Columbia Pictures on April 1, 1957.

== Plot ==
A stagecoach with sole passenger, Glen Hayden, is being driven at breakneck speed by driver Sam, when it is stopped by 3 masked men. The driver refuses to hand over the freight "again" and is shot. The stagecoach horses bolt with the bandits in pursuit while Hayden tries to keep out of sight inside. Just before they stop the stage he jumps out unseen. When the bandits start to open the stage to get the freight Hayden starts shooting. The wounded driver kills one but is fatally wounded by another. The two remaining bandits ride off. Hayden loads the dead bandit into the stage and drives it to town.

Stage line owner Joe Patterson tells the passenger it is the third holdup in 2 months. The townspeople don't recognize the dead bandit. Freight office owner Martin Maroon and henchman Harry Farrow, who are behind the robberies, watch from the freight office. Maroon is concerned that if Patterson's line is a success he will be bought out by Wells Fargo it will mean the end of his business. Patterson offers Hayden a job as stagecoach driver which he accepts. Hayden suggests to the sheriff Ned Riordan, that the dead bandit's horse, which he brought with the stage, might lead them to the gang's hideout. Riordan says he will try later that afternoon. This possibility is clearly of concern to Maroon and Farrow. Patterson's two other drivers, Tom Bradley and Maroon's niece Fran, arrive and are told of the holdup and Sam's death. Bradley takes an instant dislike to Hayden who is attracted to Fran. Farrow sneaks into the stable and kills the bandit's horse. Hayden and some townspeople run to the stable and Hayden has a shootout with Farrow who eventually escapes, running past Bradley who later claims to have seen nothing. Bradley and Maroon have an "understanding" and Bradley is upset that Sam was killed which Maroon says was an accident.

At the gangs hideout they are building a stagecoach covered with metal plate. This was Bradley's idea. Maroons plan is to run Patterson out of business and control the freight and passenger services. Bradley is the inside man who gives the Maroon information about the stages. He will put some of his own freight on the next stage that Bradley is driving, and reminds him that when it is held up to do exactly as the bandits say. Farrow is unsure of Bradley's loyalty but Maroon says that if anything goes wrong, they can blame Bradley. Bradley intends to become rich and marry Fran, but Fran isn't as keen on the idea as he is. When Maroon puts some of his freight on the stage the townsfolk are reassured about the future of Patterson's business. At the last minute Patterson tells Bradley that Hayden will be riding shotgun. Maroon takes Bradley aside and tells him they won't have to prevent the holdup.

On the trip, Bradley tells Hayden he does not like killing and that his shotgun isn't even loaded. When he tells Hayden he intends to marry Fran and go and work for Maroon, Hayden suspects he may be involved in the plot to put Patterson out of business. Before they reach the site of the holdup, Bradley distracts Hayden and throws his shotgun off the stage. When the holdup, using a phantom coach, starts, Hayden takes over the stage and they escape, but they lose all the freight and passenger Mrs Wiggins is slightly wounded. Mr and Mrs Wiggins want to return home and Hayden agrees, despite Bradley's protests. In town, Hayden is suspicious of Maroon and says so. When he gets too personal with Fran there is a fight between him and Bradley which the sheriff breaks up. Hayden wants to go back to the scene of the holdup, but the sheriff wants to wait until morning. Hayden takes a fast horse and heads off. Maroon tells Bradley he is going to fetch the gang and they will kill Hayden. Bradley wants no part of the killing, but can't stop Maroon leaving.

When sheriff Riordan changes his mind and goes after Hayden, Bradley follows. Riordan finds Hayden who tells him he is really an agent for Wells Fargo. When a dozen bandits approach and start shooting, Riordan recognizes them as Maroon's men. During the following chase Riordan insists on leading the bandits away while Hayden goes for help. Riordan is wounded and captured. Bradley finds Maroon at the hideout and tells him the phantom coach is certain evidence against them if it is discovered. Farrow and the other bandits return to the hideout with Riordan. Maroon says they will have to get rid of Riordan but Bradley wants no part of it. Farrow starts to beat Riordan to death but when he pulls a knife, Bradley intervenes and disarms him. In the confusion Riordan tries to escape and Farrow shoots him. Maroon tells Bradley he can't back out or he'll get the same as Riordan. Bradley apparently changes his mind.

The bandits move the phantom coach to Maroon's farm and remove all the evidence from the hideout. Maroon's plan is to put the coach on a wagon and transfer it across state lines. Maroon sends Fran into town with some horses that need shoeing. She arrives just as a posse is about to leave. She finds out that the sheriff is missing and that Farrow is involved. Hayden and Patterson suspect Maroon and when the posse heads to his farm to question him, Fran accompanies them. Maroon's wagons leave the farm, with the coach, and the concealed phantom coach driven by Bradley, who is under guard as Maroon still doesn't trust him. Maroon tells Bradley that once they cross the state line he needn't come back. Bradley manages to push his guard off the wagon and heads for town. Maroon chases after him in another wagon with Farrow while the remaining wagons carry on. Both sets of wagons are spotted by the posse which splits and follows each separately.

Bradley's wagon overturns and he is dragged for a short distance by the loose horses. Farrow and Maroon stop and take cover behind the upturned wagon. When Bradley approaches he is shot in the arm by Farrow, who is then shot and killed. While Maroon continues to fire at the posse, Bradley sneaks up and manages to knock him out. When the posse and Fran arrive he admits everything. Hayden says his recent actions will count in his favor. In town, while Maroon, Bradley and the rest of the gang are taken to jail, Paterson says he is selling to Wells Fargo, but only if they hire Hayden as office manager. Hayden agrees, and asks Fran to stay, but she says she is going back east.

== Cast ==
- William Bishop as Glen Hayden
- Kathleen Crowley as Fran Maroon
- Richard Webb as Tom Bradley
- Hugh Sanders as Martin Maroon
- John Doucette as Harry Farrow
- Frank Ferguson as Joe Patterson
- Ray Teal as Sheriff Ned Riorden
- Percy Helton as Mr. Wiggins
- Maudie Prickett as Mrs. Wiggins
- Leah Baird as Mrs. Simms (uncredited)
- Lane Bradford as Langton (uncredited)
- Byron Foulger as Mr. Fenshaw (uncredited)
- Coleman Francis as Townsman (uncredited)
- Frank Hagney as Rider (uncredited)
- Kermit Maynard as Henchman (uncredited)
- Dennis Moore as Townsman (uncredited)
- Emil Sitka as Johnson (uncredited)
- Al Thompson as Murphy (uncredited)
- Eddy Waller as Sam Clayton (uncredited)
- Blackie Whiteford as Townsman (uncredited)
- Robert B. Williams as Charlie Wagner (uncredited)

== Critical reception ==
Author and film critic Hal Erickson wrote in AllMovie that the film "is almost refreshingly old-fashioned" and that "amusing moments are provided by those grand old troupers Percy Helton and Maudie Prickett." Critic Mark Franklin described the film as "far short of great, but not as bad as the title might imply," noting that it is "marred by some silliness" but that "the smoky voiced Crowley makes for a feisty leading lady."
