= The I Don't Care Girl =

1953 film by Lloyd Bacon

- Theatrical release poster
- Directed by: Lloyd Bacon
- Written by: Walter Bullock; George Jessel
- Produced by: George Jessel
- Starring: Mitzi Gaynor; David Wayne; Oscar Levant; Bob Graham; Craig Hill; Warren Stevens; Hazel Brooks
- Cinematography: Arthur E. Arling
- Edited by: Louis R. Loeffler
- Music by: Herbert W. Spencer
- Distributed by: 20th Century Fox
- Release date: January 20, 1953
- Running time: 78 min.
- Country: United States
- Language: English
- Box office: $1.25 million (US)

The I Don't Care Girl is a 1953 American biographical film directed by Lloyd Bacon and starring Mitzi Gaynor. It is a biography of entertainer Eva Tanguay. The film was shot in Technicolor.

== Plot ==
The story of vaudeville performer Eva Tanguay is told to a couple of writers who plan to do a script about her for Hollywood producer George Jessel.

Her former partner Eddie McCoy tells how they met. Recently widowed, he discovered Eva as a waitress, hearing her sing and offering her a job after she's fired. Eva falls for singer Larry Woods (Bob Graham), although piano player Charles Bennett also has eyes for her. Eva is offended and sets out on her own when she finds out that Larry is married.

Bennett is found by the writers and claims Eddie's story is untrue. Eva was already singing in a cafe when she and Eddie first met. Unable to get Eddie to sober up, she breaks up their act and is discovered by Florenz Ziegfeld, who signs Eva for his famed Follies.

She learns that Larry's marriage is on the rocks, but is put off when the leading role in Larry's new operetta is apparently going to Stella, another singer. Eva hires someone to throw tomatoes at Larry on stage, unaware that when he steps out to perform, Larry, having enlisted to fight in the war, will be wearing his Army uniform. Eva's prank backfires and she is disconsolate for quite a while, but in the end, Larry wins her back.

== Cast ==
- Mitzi Gaynor as Eva Tanguay
- Oscar Levant as Charles Bennett
- David Wayne as Eddie McCoy
- Bob Graham as Larry Woods
- Craig Hill as Lawrence
- Hazel Brooks as Stella Forrest
- Warren Stevens as Keene
- George Jessel as himself
