= The Star and the Story =

American TV anthology series (1955–1956)

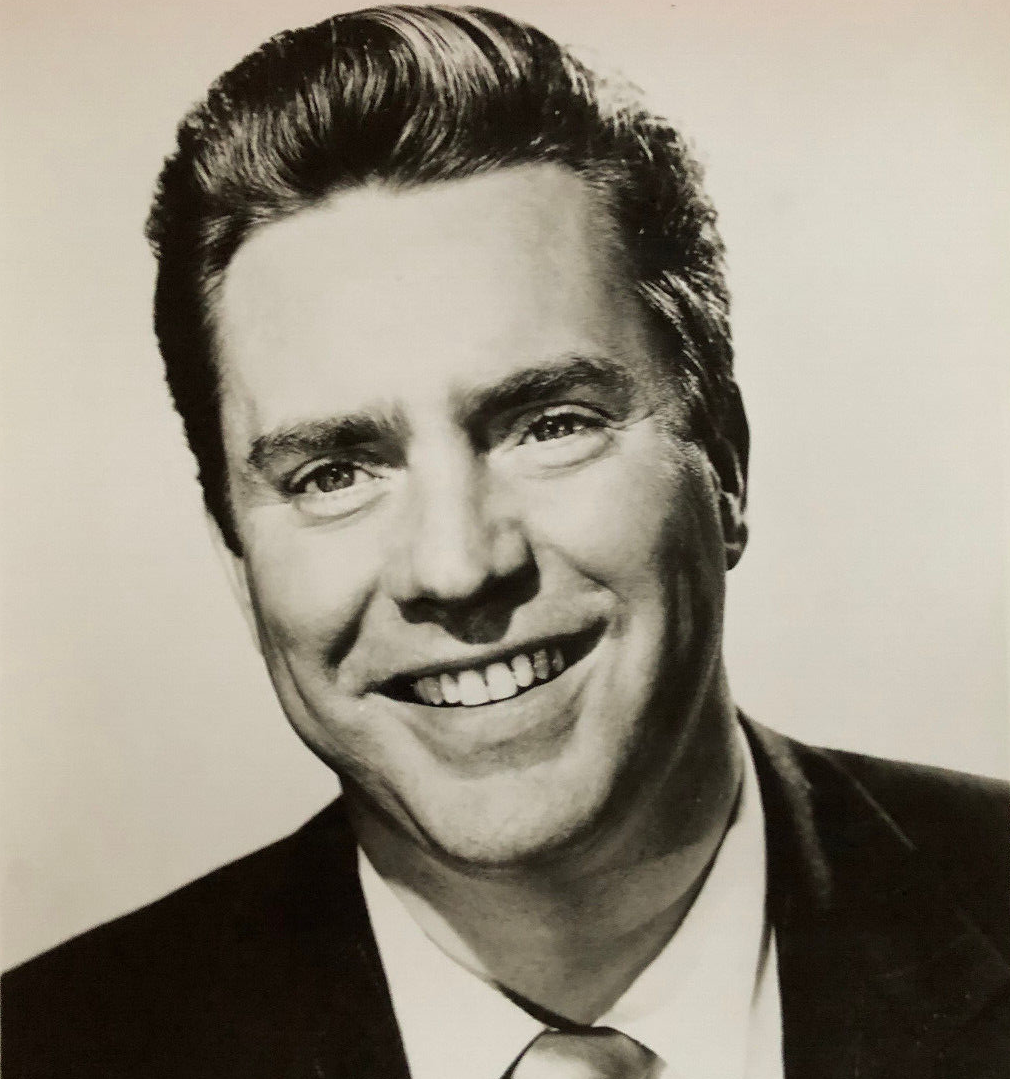
Publicity photograph of Edmond O'Brien in the series debut, "Dark Stranger"

The Star and the Story (full title Henry Fonda Presents The Star and the Story) is an American television anthology series which aired 1955–1956 in first-run syndication. A filmed half-hour series, episodes were approximately 25 minutes long, excluding commercials. Produced by Four Star Productions, it was similar in some respects to Four Star Playhouse. Thirty-nine episodes were filmed, 13 of which were based on stories by W. Somerset Maugham.

== Synopsis ==
Henry Fonda was the host, which primarily meant that he was spokesman for the beer that sponsored the show. In that role, "Fonda became the first actor of stature to deliver the commercials for somebody else's program". Accepting the commercial role caused controversy, but Fonda said the he considered doing commercials as a form of acting. "I feel if they keep the commercials dignified, it's all right," he said. He also noted that he was paid more for his work on the show than he would have been paid for making a film. Rheingold sponsored the programs in markets where it was sold.

With a new cast each week, the series featured a wide range of actors, often well-known character actors such as Edmond O'Brien and occasionally emerging stars such as Joanne Woodward. Notable directors included Blake Edwards and Robert Stevenson.

O'Brien starred in the premiere episode, "Dark Stranger".

It appears the series has entered the public domain; a number of episodes appear on budget public domain DVD releases.

== Overseas syndication ==
During the late-1950s it was exported to Australia (as were Four Star Playhouse, Stage 7, Studio 57, etc.) where it often aired under the title Whitehall Playhouse (combined with episodes of Studio 57). With limited television budgets Australian broadcasters were unable to produce a weekly anthology series of their own during the 1950s (the monthly 1959–1960 series Shell Presents was the closest to such a series, along with standalone twice-monthly plays on ABC from 1957 to early 1960s), and as such several American anthology series were shown there, along with a few British anthology series and at least one Canadian anthology. Others shown included Ford Television Theatre (re-titled Kraft TV Theatre, no relation to Kraft Television Theatre), Short Short Dramas (re-titled Playhouse 15) and Science Fiction Theatre.
