= Patrolling the Ether =

1944 film by Paul Burnford

- Directed by: Paul Burnford
- Screenplay by: DeVallon Scott; Alan Friedman
- Starring: Hazel Brooks; Marc Cramer; Richard Crane
- Cinematography: Walter Strenge
- Edited by: Harry Komer
- Music by: Nathaniel Shilkret
- Release date: April 10, 1944
- Running time: 21 minutes
- Country: United States
- Languages: English; Portuguese

Patrolling the Ether is a short film made in 1944 depicting amateur radio operators aiding the Federal Communications Commission in monitoring the airwaves for Nazi spy transmissions. It is notable as the first film ever broadcast simultaneously on more than one television station; on 10 April 1944, it was shown on three stations: WNBT, New York (now WNBC), WPTZ Philadelphia (now KYW) and WRGB Schenectady, New York, marking a milestone in the history of network television.

The film was directed by Paul Burnford, and starred Emmett Vogan.

== Cast ==
- Hazel Brooks as Taxi Driver/German Spy (uncredited)
- Marc Cramer as German Spy in Taxi (uncredited)
- Richard Crane as Phillip (uncredited)
- Donald Curtis as Bill Beck (uncredited)
- Connie Gilchrist as Phillip's Mother (uncredited)
- Selmer Jackson

Chief of Radio Intelligence Division (uncredited)

- Lee Phelps as Bit Role (uncredited)
- Emmett Vogan as Aide to Chief of Radio Intelligence Division (uncredited)
