= Sam McMurray =

American actor (born 1952)

- Born: April 15, 1952 (age 74); New York City, U.S.
- Occupation: Actor
- Years active: 1975–present
- Spouse: Elizabeth Collins
- Children: 2
- Parent: Lesley Woods (stepmother)

Samuel McMurray (born April 15, 1952) is an American actor. He is known for his roles as Supervisor Patrick O'Boyle in the CBS sitcom The King of Queens, Glen in the Coen Brothers comedy film Raising Arizona, Trent Culpepper in the sitcom Cristela and for voicing Roy in the family sitcom television series Dinosaurs. He also appeared as Doug on the NBC sitcom Friends, and as Ned on the CBS sitcom Mom. He also appeared as a gay man named Andy in the fifth season of Married... with Children.

== Early life ==
McMurray was born in New York City on April 15, 1952, the son of Jane (née Hoffman) and Richard McMurray, both actors. Lesley Woods was his stepmother. McMurray is Jewish on his mother's side of the family and Irish on his father's side of the family.

== Career ==
Among McMurray's film credits are C.H.U.D. (1984), Raising Arizona (1987), The Wizard (1989) as Jimmy's stepfather Mr. Bateman, National Lampoon's Christmas Vacation (1989), L.A. Story (1991), Addams Family Values (1993), and Drop Dead Gorgeous (1999). On television, he was a regular on The Tracey Ullman Show, voiced Roy in the series Dinosaurs, and played recurring roles such as Chandler's boss on Friends, dentist Vic Schweiber on Freaks and Geeks, Doug and Deacon's boss in The King of Queens, and Ned in the sitcom Mom. He was also in episodes of The Jeffersons, Hill Street Blues, The Golden Girls, Who's the Boss?, Married... with Children, Home Improvement, Disney's Recess, The Sopranos, The Tick, Malcolm in the Middle and Breaking Bad among others. He is also noted for being the first-ever guest star on The Simpsons.

McMurray gained much international recognition among gamers for his role as the voice of two newscasters in the expansion for Command & Conquer: Generals. He also appeared in the 2011 TV film Holiday Engagement. For the 2014–2015 television season, McMurray had a main role as Trent Culpepper in the ABC comedy series Cristela.

== Personal life ==
McMurray was married to actress Elizabeth Collins. They have two daughters.

== Filmography ==
=== Film ===
| Year | Title | Role | Notes |
|---|---|---|---|
| 1976 | The Front | Young Man At Party | Film Debut |
| 1980 | Union City | Young Vagrant | |
| 1983 | Baby It's You | Mr. McManus | |
| 1984 | C.H.U.D. | Officer Crespi | |
| 1985 | Fast Forward | Clem Friedkin | |
| 1987 | Raising Arizona | Glen | |
| 1987 | Ray's Male Heterosexual Dance Hall | Peter Harriman | |
| 1989 | National Lampoon's Christmas Vacation | Bill | |
| 1989 | The Wizard | Bateman | |
| 1990 | Little Vegas | Kreimach | |
| 1991 | L.A. Story | Morris Frost | |
| 1991 | Stone Cold | Lance | |
| 1992 | Class Act | Skip Wankman | |
| 1993 | Addams Family Values | Don Buckman | |
| 1994 | Getting Even with Dad | Detective Alex Serransky | |
| 1996 | Dear God | Federal Prosecutor | |
| 1997 | Savage | Edgar Wallace | |
| 1998 | Slappy and the Stinkers | Anthony Boccoli | |
| 1999 | Baby Geniuses | Goon Bob | |
| 1999 | The Mod Squad | Tricky | |
| 1999 | Drop Dead Gorgeous | Lester Leeman | |
| 1999 | Carlo's Wake | Jerry Brock | |
| 2000 | Lucky Numbers | Chief Troutman | |
| 2002 | Lone Star State of Mind | Mr. Smith | |
| 2002 | Sunshine State | Todd Northrup | |
| 2003 | Stealing Sinatra | Agent Stamek | |
| 2010 | A Little Help | Big Bad Dan | |
| 2015 | Road Hard | Burt Crabtree | |
| 2015 | Pearly Gates | Sol | |
| 2015 | Jenny's Wedding | Denny O'Leary | |
| 2017 | Americons | Kerry Stein | |
| 2019 | Klaus | Postmaster | Voice |

=== Television ===
| Year | Title | Role | Notes |
|---|---|---|---|
| 1976 | Kojak | Duke Peter Dushan | Episode: "The Pride and the Princess" |
| 1979 | The Jeffersons | Howard Benson | Episode: "Louise's Convention" |
| 1979 | The Ropers | Charles Remington | Episode: "All Around the Clock" |
| 1979 | The Edge of Night | Phil | 7 episodes |
| 1980 | The Doctors | Norman Rowan | 12 episodes July-August |
| 1982 | Baker's Dozen | Harve Schoendorf | 6 episodes |
| 1983 | Ryan's Hope | Wes Leonard | Recurring role |
| 1984 | Miami Vice | Jimmy 'Jimbo' Walters | Episode: "Calderone's Return: Part 2 - Calderone's Demise" |
| 1986 | You Again? | Stu Angry | Episode: "The D.J." |
| 1986 | Hill Street Blues | Officer Gann | Episode: "More Skinned Against Than Skinning" |
| 1987 | Ohara | Saxon | Episode: "Darryl" |
| 1987 | Moonlighting | Moe Highler | Episode: "Blonde on Blonde" |
| 1987–1990 | The Tracey Ullman Show | Various | 63 episodes |
| 1988 | 21 Jump Street | Lt. Tony Brandt | Episode: "Raising Marijuana" |
| 1988 | Head of the Class | Coach Finelli | Episode: "The Refrigerator of Filmore High" |
| 1988 | Empty Nest | Brent | Episode: "Father of the Bride" |
| 1988–1989 | Dear John | Mike | 2 episodes |
| 1989–1991 | Who's the Boss? | Mark Harper | 2 episodes |
| 1989 | Matlock | Bart Hess | Episode: "The Model" |
| 1990 | The Golden Girls | Mr. Kane | Episode: "Cheaters" |
| 1990 | The Simpsons | Gulliver Dark, SNPP Employee, Duff Commercial VO | Voice, 2 episodes |
| 1990 | Married... with Children | Andy | Episode: "Dance Show" |
| 1991–1994 | Dinosaurs | Roy Hess | Voice, 50 episodes |
| 1991 | Home Improvement | Rondall Kittleman | Episode: "Satellite on a Hot Tim's Roof" |
| 1991 | Blossom | Sergio | Episode: "Run for the Border" |
| 1991 | Civil Wars | Walter Herrigan | Episode: "Have Gun, Will Unravel" |
| 1992 | Sibs | Channing | 2 episodes |
| 1992 | Parker Lewis Can't Lose | Mr. Rips | Episode: "Goodbye Mr. Rips" |
| 1992 | Stand By Your Man | Roger Dunphy | 5 episodes |
| 1992 | Likely Suspects | Detective Marshak | 9 episodes |
| 1993 | Batman: The Animated Series | Pierce | Voice, episode: "Birds of a Feather" |
| 1993 | Down the Shore | Ron | Episode: "Life's a Drag" |
| 1993 | A League of Their Own | Coach Jimmy Dugan | 6 episodes |
| 1993 | Bonkers | Additional voices | 3 episodes |
| 1995 | The Critic | Cyrus Tompkins | Voice, episode: "Sherman, Woman and Child" |
| 1995 | Medicine Ball | Dr. Douglas McGill | 7 episodes |
| 1995 | Maybe This Time | Gary | Episode: "Maybe This Time" |
| 1995–1997 | Deadly Games | Detective Dorn | 4 episodes |
| 1995 | Party of Five | Thomas | Episode: "Change Partners... and Dance" |
| 1995–1997 | Pinky and the Brain | Video Teacher, Tax Man #1, Shawn | Voice, 3 episodes |
| 1996 | Matt Waters | Charlie Sweet | 6 episodes |
| 1996 | Aaahh!!! Real Monsters | Mickey, Fred | Voice, episode: "Krumm Gets Ahead / It's Only a Movie" |
| 1997 | Wings | Dennis Lundy | Episode: "Hosed" |
| 1997 | The Pretender | Morris Clancy | Episode: "Prison Story" |
| 1997 | Chicago Hope | Dr. David Stockton | 2 episodes |
| 1997 | Soul Man | Oliver Marley | Episode: "Cinderella and the Funeral" |
| 1997–2001 | Friends | Doug | 3 episodes |
| 1997 | Pearl | Freddy Rizzo | Episode: "The Two Mrs. Rizzos" |
| 1997 | Johnny Bravo | Pilot, Clown, Keith Doll | Voice, 6 episodes |
| 1997–2000 | Recess | Lt. Griswold, Bob Spinelli, Various | Voice, 12 episodes |
| 1997–2002 | Hey Arnold! | Buckley Lloyd, Robby Fisher | Voice, 4 episodes |
| 1997–1998 | Living Single | Marco McCulloch | 2 episodes |
| 1998 | Diagnosis: Murder | Bob Bare | Episode: "Baby Boom" |
| 1998 | The New Batman Adventures | Ernie | Voice, episode: "Joker's Millions" |
| 1998 | Cosby | Ken | Episode: "On The Rocks" |
| 1998 | The Angry Beavers | Rodrick Snootwell | Voice, episode: "Open Wide for Zombies" / "Dumbwaiters" |
| 1999–2000 | Batman Beyond | Chelsea's Dad, Burn, Harry Tully | Voice, 4 episodes |
| 1999 | Tracey Takes On... | Dentist | Episode: "Scandal" |
| 1999 | Rugrats | Zookeeper | Voice, episode: "Zoo Story" |
| 1999 | The Wild Thornberrys | Flip | Voice, episode: "You Otter Know" |
| 2000 | Freaks and Geeks | Dr. Vic Schweiber | 3 episodes |
| 2001 | The Lot | Milton Maxwell | Episode: "The Accident" |
| 2001 | Malcolm in the Middle | Officer Stockton | Episode: "Traffic Ticket" |
| 2001 | Yes, Dear | Dr. Bernstein | Episode: "Doctor, Doctor" |
| 2001 | Deadline | —N/a | Episode: "Somebody's Fool" |
| 2001 | The Sopranos | Dr. John Kennedy | Episode: "Second Opinion" |
| 2001-2004 | Lloyd in Space | Coach Antonio | 5 episodes |
| 2001–2006 | The King of Queens | Supervisor Patrick O'Boyle | 16 episodes |
| 2001 | Spin City | Daniel Bryant | Episode: "You've Got Male" |
| 2001 | The Tick | The Immortal | Episode: "The Funeral" |
| 2001 | The Zeta Project | Larry Lux | Voice, episode: "Ro's Reunion" |
| 2001 | Reba | Mr. Montgomery | Episode: "Tea and Antipathy" |
| 2002 | Touched by an Angel | Norris | Episode: "The Sixteenth Minute" |
| 2002 | As Told By Ginger | Prescott Gripling, Reporter #3 | Voice, episode: "TGIF" |
| 2003 | Greetings from Tucson | Mr. Modica | Episode: "Student Council" |
| 2003 | Free for All | Douglas Jenkins | 7 episodes |
| 2004 | Justice League Unlimited | Gilbert Halestrom | Voice, episode: "Fearful Symmetry" |
| 2005 | NYPD Blue | Lieutenant Jeff Henry | Episode: "Bale to the Chief" |
| 2005 | Head Cases | Al Girard | Episode: "S(elf) Help" |
| 2005–2014 | The Boondocks | The Principal, Ed Wuncler II, Various | Voice, 7 episodes |
| 2006 | That '70s Show | Larry | Episode: "My Fairy King" |
| 2006 | Huff | Dr. Hoffman | 2 episodes |
| 2007 | Cold Case | Tom 'Z' Zimmerman | Episode: "Blood on the Tracks" |
| 2007 | The Suite Life of Zack & Cody | Bud | 2 episodes |
| 2007 | Boston Legal | General Mark 'Fitz' Fitzgerald | Episode: "Do Tell" |
| 2008–2009 | Head Case | Dr. Goode's Father | 3 episodes |
| 2008 | ER | Mike Landry | Episode: "Tandem Repeats" |
| 2009–2010 | Tracey Ullman's State of the Union | Various | 5 episodes |
| 2009 | Breaking Bad | Dr. Victor Bravenec | 2 episodes |
| 2009 | Glenn Martin, DDS | Tucker Wade | Voice, episode: "From Here to Fraternity" |
| 2010 | The Secret Life of the American Teenager | —N/a | Episode: "The Sound of Silence" |
| 2010–2011 | Pound Puppies | Rover, Dad | Voice, 2 episodes |
| 2011 | Raising Hope | Doctor Burwitz | Episode: "Snip Snip" |
| 2011 | Lights Out | Priest at Confession | Episode: "War" |
| 2011 | Then We Got Help! | Jan | 2 episodes |
| 2011 | Desperate Housewives | Father Dugan | Episode: "Secrets That I Never Want to Know" |
| 2011 | NCIS | Vince Westfal | Episode: "The Penelope Papers" |
| 2011 | Grey's Anatomy | Gus Moser | Episode: "Poker Face" |
| 2012 | Law & Order: Special Victims Unit | Attorney | Episode: "Rhodium Nights" |
| 2012 | Scandal | Pat Wexler | 4 episodes |
| 2013 | Wendell & Vinnie | Howard | Episode: "Fathers of Fathers & Sons" |
| 2013–2018 | The Fosters | Frank Cooper | 5 episodes |
| 2014 | Murder in the First | Dexter Wesley | Episode: "Blunt the Edge" |
| 2014–2015 | Cristela | Trent Culpepper | 22 episodes |
| 2015 | Masters of Sex | Mr. Avery | Episode: "Surrogates" |
| 2016 | Devious Maids | Hugh Metzger | 4 episodes |
| 2016 | Bull | Errol Windemere | Episode: "Callisto" |
| 2017 | Unbreakable Kimmy Schmidt | Doug Gozer | Episode: "Kimmy Pulls Off a Heist!" |
| 2017 | Ghosted | Campbell McMasters | Episode: "The Machine" |
| 2018 | The Good Fight | Joe Swoboda | Episode: "Day 415" |
| 2018–2019 | Mom | Ned | 3 episodes |
| 2019 | Grace and Frankie | Vince | 2 episodes |
| 2019 | Elementary | Cameron Manarek | Episode: "Red Light, Green Light" |
| 2020 | United We Fall | Dave Plonker | 2 episodes |
| 2022 | The Young and the Restless | Dwight | 1 episode (May 23, 2022) |
| 2024 | General Hospital | Congressman McConkey | 1 episode (Fri. May 3rd, 2024) |
| 2024 | Law & Order | Judge Steve Nelson | Episode: "No Good Deed" |
| 2024 | NCIS | Harold Lamb | Episode: "Hard Boiled" |
| 2025 | Elsbeth | Coach Willoughby | Episode: "Basket Case" |

==== Television films ====
| Year | Title | Role | Notes |
|---|---|---|---|
| 1985 | Out of the Darkness | Morrison | |
| 1986 | Adam: His Song Continues | Police Lieutenant | |
| 1987 | Hands of a Stranger | Pearson | |
| 1987 | The Hope Division | Frank McGee | |
| 1988 | Take My Daughters, Please | —N/a | |
| 1994 | Attack of the 5 Ft. 2 In. Women | Dick Langley | |
| 1996 | The Munsters' Scary Little Christmas | Herman Munster | |
| 1999 | Soccer Dog: The Movie | Coach Shaw | |
| 2000 | The Amati Girls | Brian | |
| 2003 | Tracey Ullman in the Trailer Tales | Skip Westland | |
| 2003 | Recess: Taking the Fifth Grade | Bob Spinelli | Voice |
| 2003 | Recess: All Growed Down | Gus's Dad | Voice |
| 2005 | McBride: Anybody Here Murder Marty? | Arnie | |
| 2007 | Lake Placid 2 | Struthers | |
| 2008 | Ring of Death | Wheaton | |
| 2011 | The Craigslist Killer | Dr. Janeway | |
| 2011 | Holiday Engagement | Roy Burns | |
| 2012 | Cupid, Inc. | Harvey Mitford | |
| 2012 | Blue Eyed Butcher | Dr. Sheffield | |
| 2012 | Batman: The Dark Knight Returns | Anchor Ted | Voice |

==== Pilots ====
| Year | Title | Role | Notes |
|---|---|---|---|
| 1982 | Not Necessarily the News | Various | Episode: "Not Necessarily the News" |
| 1999 | Chaos Theory | —N/a | |
| 2000 | Those Who Can | —N/a | |
| 2013 | Dads | —N/a | |

==== Specials ====
| Year | Title | Role | Notes |
|---|---|---|---|
| 1990 | The Best of the Tracey Ullman Show | —N/a | |
| 1996 | Teenage Confidential | —N/a | |
| 1998 | Tracey Ullman Backstage | —N/a | |

==== Episodic ====
| Year | Title | Role | Notes |
|---|---|---|---|
| 1976 | Ourstory | —N/a | |
| 1986 | Easy Street | —N/a | |
| 1998 | Pulp Comics | —N/a | "Pulp Comics: Dana Gould" December 22, 1998 |

==== Video games ====
| Year | Title | Voice role |
|---|---|---|
| 2000 | Command & Conquer: Red Alert 2 | BBC newscaster, American newscaster |
| 2001 | Command & Conquer: Yuri's Revenge | Additional voices |
| 2003 | Command & Conquer: Generals | BBC Newscaster, American Newscaster |
| 2004 | Law & Order: Justice is Served | Jack Foster, Henry Haskins |
| 2005 | True Crime: New York City | |
| 2014 | Sunset Overdrive | Walter |

==== Web ====
| Year | Title | Role | Notes |
|---|---|---|---|
| 2016 | Kevin Pollak's Chat Show | Himself/Guest | Episode: "255" |

=== As producer ===
| Year | Title | Notes |
|---|---|---|
| 1998 | Slappy and the Stinkers | Co-producer |

=== Stage appearances ===
- The Merry Wives of Windsor, Delacorte Theatre, Joseph Papp PublicTheater/New York Shakespeare Festival, New York City, 1974
- (Off-Broadway debut) Lonnie, The Taking of Miss Janie, New York Shakespeare Festival, Mitzi E. Newhouse Theater, 1975
- Otis Fitzhugh, Ballymurphy, Manhattan Theatre Club, New York City,1976
- Bobby Wheeler, Clarence, Roundabout Theatre, New York City, 1976
- Doalty, Translations, Manhattan Theatre Club, 1981
- The Great Magoo, Hartford Stage Company, Hartford, CT, 1982
- Mick Connor, Comedians, Manhattan Punch Line Theatre, New York City, 1983
- Man Overboard, Sargent Theatre, New York City, 1983
- Benjamin "Kid Purple" Schwartz, Kid Purple, Manhattan Punch Line Theatre, 1984
- Homesteaders, Long Wharf Theatre, New Haven, CT, 1984
- Phil, Desperadoes, in Marathon '85, Ensemble Studio Theatre, New York City, 1985
- Mike Connor, The Philadelphia Story, Hartman Theatre, Stamford, CT, 1985
- Union Boys, Yale Repertory Theatre, New Haven, CT, 1985
- L.A. Freewheeling, Hartley House Theatre, New York City, 1986
- Savage in Limbo, O'Neill Theatre Center, New London, CT, 1987, then Cast Theatre, Los Angeles
- Also appeared as Phil, The Dumping Ground, Ensemble Studio Theatre; and in Welfare, The Store, and Lucky Star, all Ensemble Studio Theatre; A Soldier's Play, New York City; The Connection, New York City.

== Awards and nominations ==
Awards and nominations
| Year 1987 | Award Drama Desk | Category Drama | Savage in Limbo | Result winner |
|---|---|---|---|---|
| 1997 | Daytime Emmy Award | Outstanding Performer in a Children's Special | ABC Afterschool Specials | Nominated |
| 2012 | Indie Series Awards | Best Guest Appearance | Then We Got Help! | Nominated |
