= Lloyd Bridges =

American actor (1913–1998)

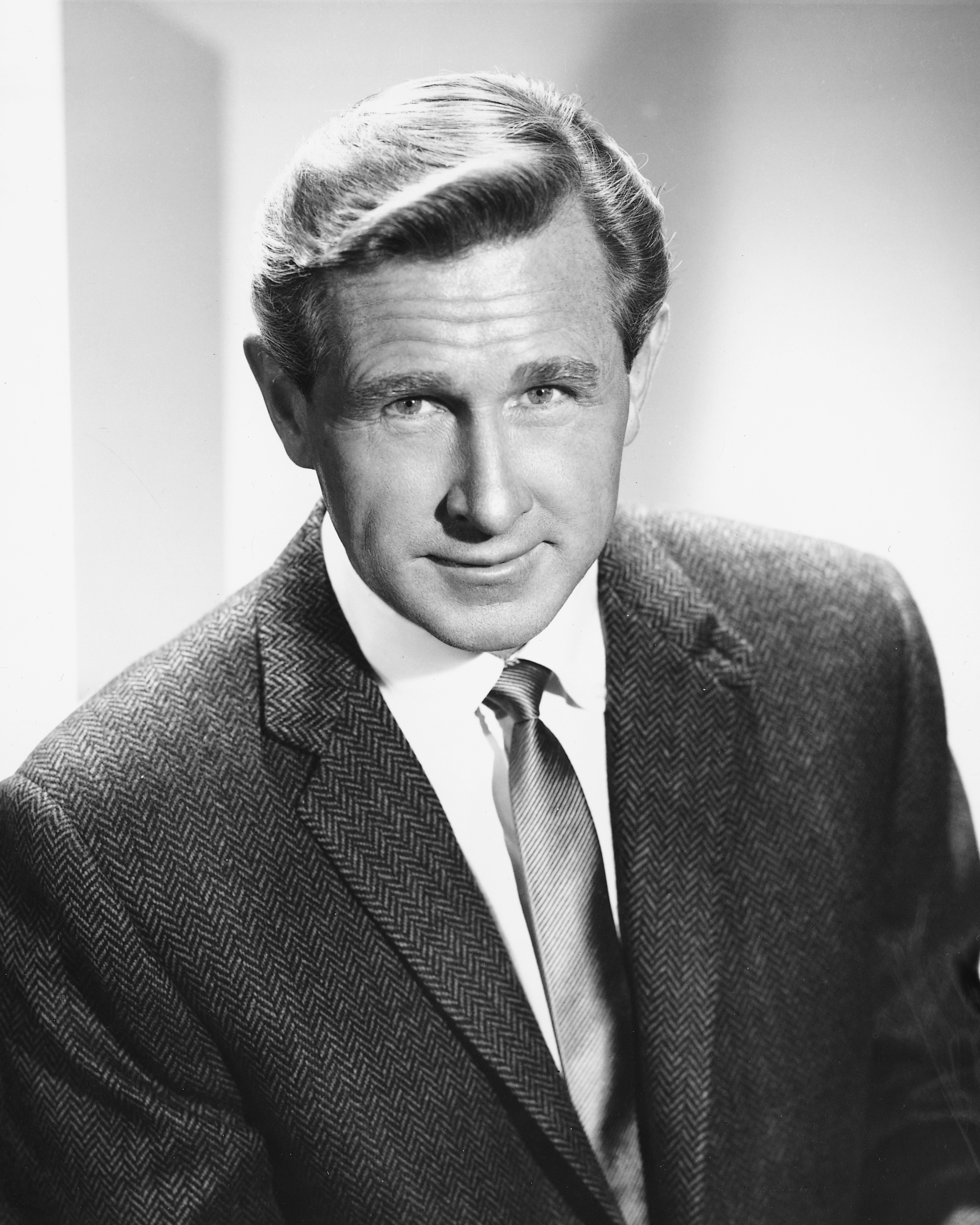
- Bridges in 1966
- Born: Lloyd Vernet Bridges Jr. January 15, 1913; San Leandro, California, U.S.
- Died: March 10, 1998 (aged 85); Los Angeles, California, U.S.
- Education: University of California, Los Angeles
- Occupation: Actor
- Years active: 1936–1998
- Spouse: Dorothy Bridges (m. 1938)
- Children: 4, including Beau and Jeff
- Relatives: Jordan Bridges (grandson)
- Awards: Hollywood Walk of Fame

Lloyd Vernet Bridges Jr. (January 15, 1913 – March 10, 1998) was an American film, stage and television actor who starred in a number of television series and appeared in more than 150 feature films. He was the father of four children, including the actors Beau Bridges and Jeff Bridges. He started his career as a contract performer for Columbia Pictures, appearing in films such as Sahara (1943), A Walk in the Sun (1945), Little Big Horn (1951) and High Noon (1952). On television, he starred in Sea Hunt (1958–1961). By the end of his career, he had re-invented himself and demonstrated a comedic talent in such parody films as Airplane! (1980), Hot Shots! (1991), and Jane Austen's Mafia! (1998). Among other honors, Bridges was a two-time Emmy Award nominee. He received a star on the Hollywood Walk of Fame on February 1, 1994.

== Early life ==
Bridges was born on January 15, 1913, in San Leandro, California, a suburb of Oakland. His parents are Harriet Evelyn (née Brown) Bridges (1893–1950) and Lloyd Vernet Bridges Sr. (1887–1962), who was involved in the California hotel business and once owned a movie theater. His parents were both from Kansas; both were of almost entirely English ancestry. Bridges was a direct descendant of William Bridges, who arrived in New England in 1623 aboard the ship Little James. Bridges graduated from Petaluma High School in 1930. He then studied political science at UCLA, where he was a member of Sigma Alpha Epsilon fraternity.

== Career ==
Bridges had small uncredited roles in the films Freshman Love (1936) and Dancing Feet (1936).

=== Theatre ===
Bridges made his Broadway debut in 1937 in a short-lived production of Shakespeare's Othello, starring Walter Huston and Brian Aherne; Bridges was in the Ensemble.

He appeared on stage in Suzanna and the Elders (1940). In Hollywood he had an uncredited role in Northwest Passage (1940).

=== Columbia Pictures and U.S. Coast Guard ===
In 1940, Bridges joined the stock company at Columbia Pictures at $75 a week, where he played small roles in features and short subjects.

He could be seen in The Lone Wolf Takes a Chance (1941), They Dare Not Love (1941), Doctor's Alibi (1941), Blue Clay (1941), Our Wife (1941), and I Was a Prisoner on Devil's Island (1941). In Here Comes Mr. Jordan (1941) Bridges is the pilot of the plane in the "heaven" scene.

Bridges later reflected,

I didn't have enough maturity for a leading man. I looked too broad in the shoulders ... too much like a kid. I never could get into (Columbia studio boss) Harry Cohn's office. All the best roles went to Glenn Ford and William Holden. They just put me in these awful B-pictures, like Two Latins from Manhattan. I even did a Three Stooges short. Sometimes I'd be in two or three movies a week. It was tough sledding.

He left Columbia Pictures during World War II to enlist in the United States Coast Guard. Following his discharge, he returned to acting. In later years, he was a member of the U.S. Coast Guard Auxiliary, did several public service announcements for the organization, and was made an honorary commodore. Bridges's Sea Hunt character Mike Nelson was also portrayed as a member of the Coast Guard Auxiliary and sometimes appeared in uniform. Bridges's sons, actors Beau and Jeff, also served in the Coast Guard and Coast Guard Reserve.

=== Post-war career ===
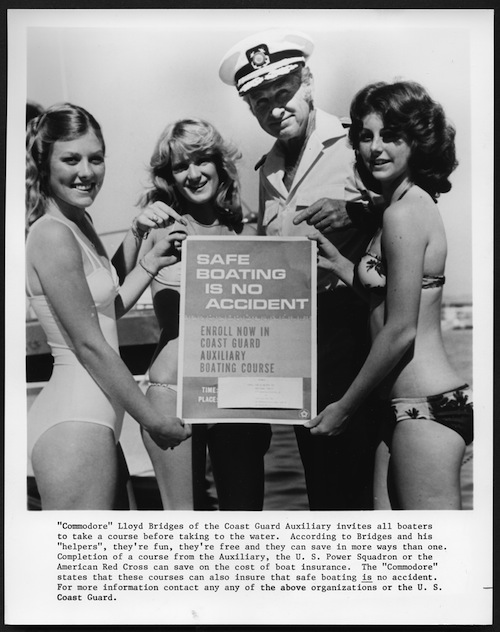
Commodore Lloyd Bridges, U.S. Coast Guard Auxiliary public service poster

Bridges's first lead role was in the serial Secret Agent X-9 (1945) made for Universal. That studio kept him on for Strange Confession (1945), an Inner Sanctum mystery.

Bridges had some supporting roles in independent films, A Walk in the Sun (1945), and Abilene Town (1946). He was in Paramount's Miss Susie Slagle's (1946) and Walter Wanger's Canyon Passage (1947). In 1947 he appeared in a small role in Cecil B. DeMille's film Unconquered.

=== Leading man ===
He returned to lead roles with Secret Service Investigator (1948) at Republic Pictures, and 16 Fathoms Deep (1948) for Monogram Pictures. Bridges had a supporting role in Frank Borzage's Moonrise (1948) then was the lead in Hideout (1949) for Republic.

Bridges was in a Western at Universal directed by George Sherman, Red Canyon (1949), and a short at MGM, Mr. Whitney Had a Notion (1949). He had a good role in Home of the Brave (1949). At Universal he was Howard Duff's friend in Calamity Jane and Sam Bass (1949), again for Sherman.

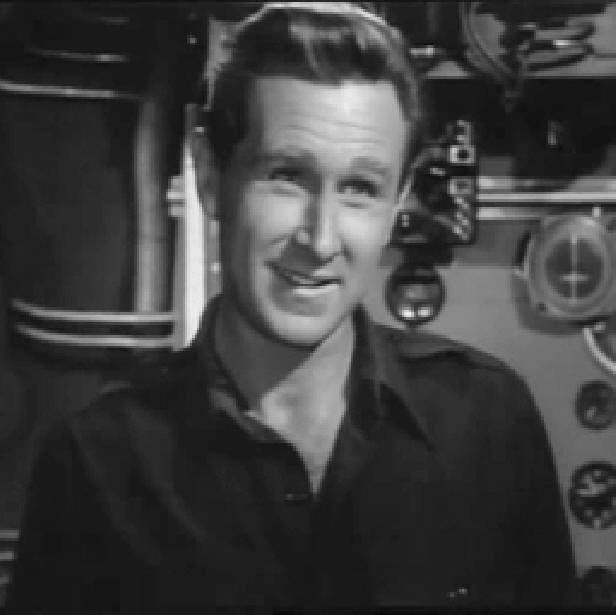
In Rocketship X-M (1950)

Bridges had the star role in Trapped (1949) directed by Richard Fleischer for Eagle Lion and Rocketship X-M (1950) for Lippert Pictures. He had supporting roles in Colt .45 (1951), The White Tower (1951), and The Sound of Fury (1950) (directed by Cy Endfield).

=== Blacklisting ===
Bridges was blacklisted briefly in the 1950s after he admitted to the House Un-American Activities Committee that he had once been a member of the Actors' Laboratory Theatre, a group found to have had links to the Communist Party USA. He returned to acting after recanting his membership and serving as a cooperative witness, achieving his greatest success in television.

Bridges made his TV debut in 1951 with "Man's First Debt" in The Bigelow Theatre. He had starring roles in the films The Fighting Seventh (1951), Three Steps North (1951), and Richer Than the Earth (1951).

On TV he did "Rise Up and Walk" for Robert Montgomery Presents (1952) and "International Incident" for Studio One in Hollywood (1952) (the latter directed by Franklin J. Schaffner). Bridges had a supporting role in High Noon (1952).

Bridges guest starred on Suspense ("Her Last Adventure") and Schlitz Playhouse ("This Plane for Hire"), and had supporting roles in Plymouth Adventure (1952) and The Sabre and the Arrow (1953). Bridges returned to leads in The Tall Texan (1953) for Lippert Pictures.

Bridges was in "The Long Way Home" for Goodyear Playhouse (1953), and appeared in The Kid from Left Field (1953) and City of Bad Men (1953) for Fox. He travelled to the UK to star in The Limping Man (1953) for Cy Endfield. He returned to Broadway in Dead Pigeon (1953–54), which had a short run.

He had the lead in a horse movie, Prince of the Blue Grass (1954) and returned to England to make Third Party Risk (1954) for Hammer Films.

In Hollywood Bridges supported Joel McCrea in Wichita (1955) and had the lead in Roger Corman's low-budget Apache Woman (1955).

=== Television ===
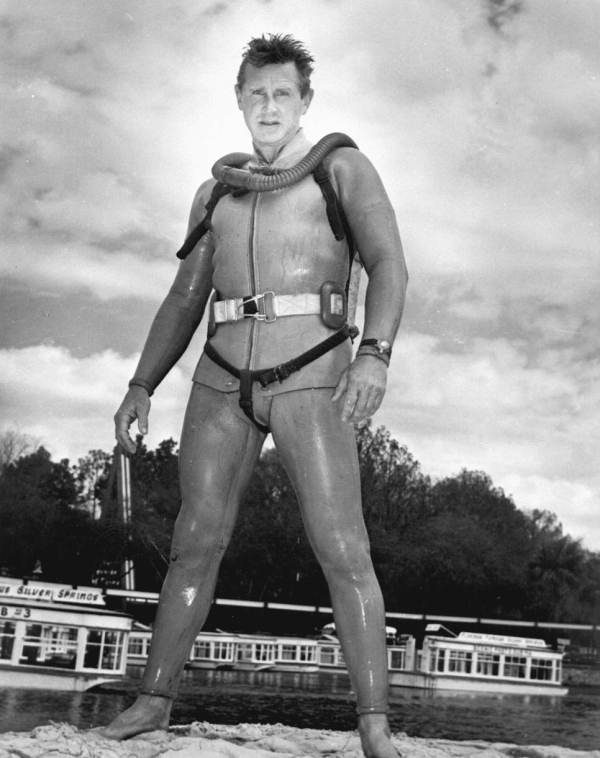
Bridges in Sea Hunt

On TV Bridges performed in "Broadway Trust" for Crossroads (1955), "The Dark Fleece" and "Edge of Terror" for Climax! (1955) (the latter directed by John Frankenheimer), "The Ainsley Case" for Front Row Center (1956), "Across the Dust" and "Prairie Dog Court" for Chevron Hall of Stars (1956), and "The Silent Gun" and "American Primitive" for Studio One in Hollywood (1956). He had the lead in the low budget Wetbacks (1956) and a supporting role in The Rainmaker (1956).

Bridges gained attention in 1956 for his emotional performance on the live anthology program The Alcoa Hour, in an episode titled "Tragedy in a Temporary Town" written by Reginald Rose and directed by Sidney Lumet. During the performance, Bridges inadvertently used profanity while ad-libbing. Although the slip of the tongue generated hundreds of complaints, the episode won a Robert E. Sherwood Television Award, with Bridges's slip being defended even by some members of the clergy. Bridges received an Emmy Award nomination for the role.

Bridges did "The Regulators" for Studio 57 (1956), "They Never Forget" for The United States Steel Hour (1957), "Ride the Wild Mare" for The Alcoa Hour (1957), "Man on the Outside" for Studio 57 (1957), "The Sound of Silence", "Figures in Clay" and "The Disappearance of Amanda Hale" for Climax!, "Heritage of Anger" (1956) and "Clash by Night" (1957) for Playhouse 90, the latter with Kim Stanley. Bridges also made several episodes of Zane Grey Theatre including "Time of Decision" (1957) and "Wire" (1958).

He supported Rory Calhoun in Ride Out for Revenge (1957) and did "A Time to Cry" on The Frank Sinatra Show (1958) and had one of his best ever cinema roles in The Goddess (1958) based on a script by Paddy Chayefsky based on the life of Marilyn Monroe; Bridges played a sportsman based on Joe di Maggio opposite Kim Stanley. He directed "Piano to Thunder Springs" for Target (1958).

=== Sea Hunt (1958–1961) ===
Bridges gained wide recognition as Mike Nelson, the main character in the television series Sea Hunt, created by Ivan Tors, which ran in syndication from 1958 to 1961. He also wrote a book with a co-author about skin-diving entitled Mask and Flippers.

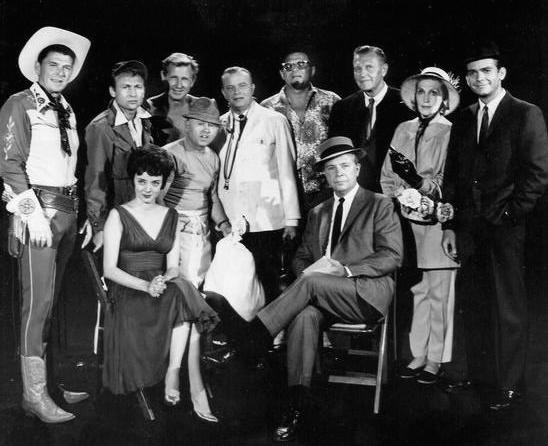
Guest stars for the 1961 premiere episode of The Dick Powell Show, "Who Killed Julie Greer?". Standing, from left: Ronald Reagan, Nick Adams, Lloyd Bridges, Mickey Rooney, Edgar Bergen, Jack Carson, Ralph Bellamy, Kay Thompson, Dean Jones. Seated, from left, Carolyn Jones and Dick Powell.

Bridges did "Lepke" (1959) for Westinghouse Desilu Playhouse (1960), "Ransom" (1960) (directed by Budd Boetticher) and "Image of a Drawn Sword" (1961) for Zane Grey Theatre. He did a TV movie The Valley of Decision (1960), "Death of the Temple Bay" for The DuPont Show with June Allyson (1961), "Who Killed Julie Greer?" (1961) for The Dick Powell Theatre, "The Fortress" (1961) for Alcoa Premiere (with Fred Astaire), and "The Two of Us" (1962) for Checkmate. He also did a special Marineland Carnival (1962).

=== The Lloyd Bridges Show (1962–1963) ===
Bridges starred in the eponymous CBS anthology series The Lloyd Bridges Show (1962–1963) (produced by Aaron Spelling) which included appearances by his sons Beau and Jeff.

Bridges followed it with "A Hero for Our Times" for Kraft Suspense Theatre (1963), "Wild Bill Hickok – the Legend and the Man" for The Great Adventure (1964), "Cannibal Plants, They Eat You Alive" for The Eleventh Hour (1964) and "Exit from a Plane in Flight" for Theater of Stars (1965).

Producer Gene Roddenberry offered Bridges a starring role on what became Star Trek. Bridges declined, saying he got along well with Roddenberry on a personal level but had no desire to work in science fiction. The part went to Jeffrey Hunter for the pilot episode The Cage and ultimately to William Shatner for the first incarnation of the television series.

=== The Loner ===
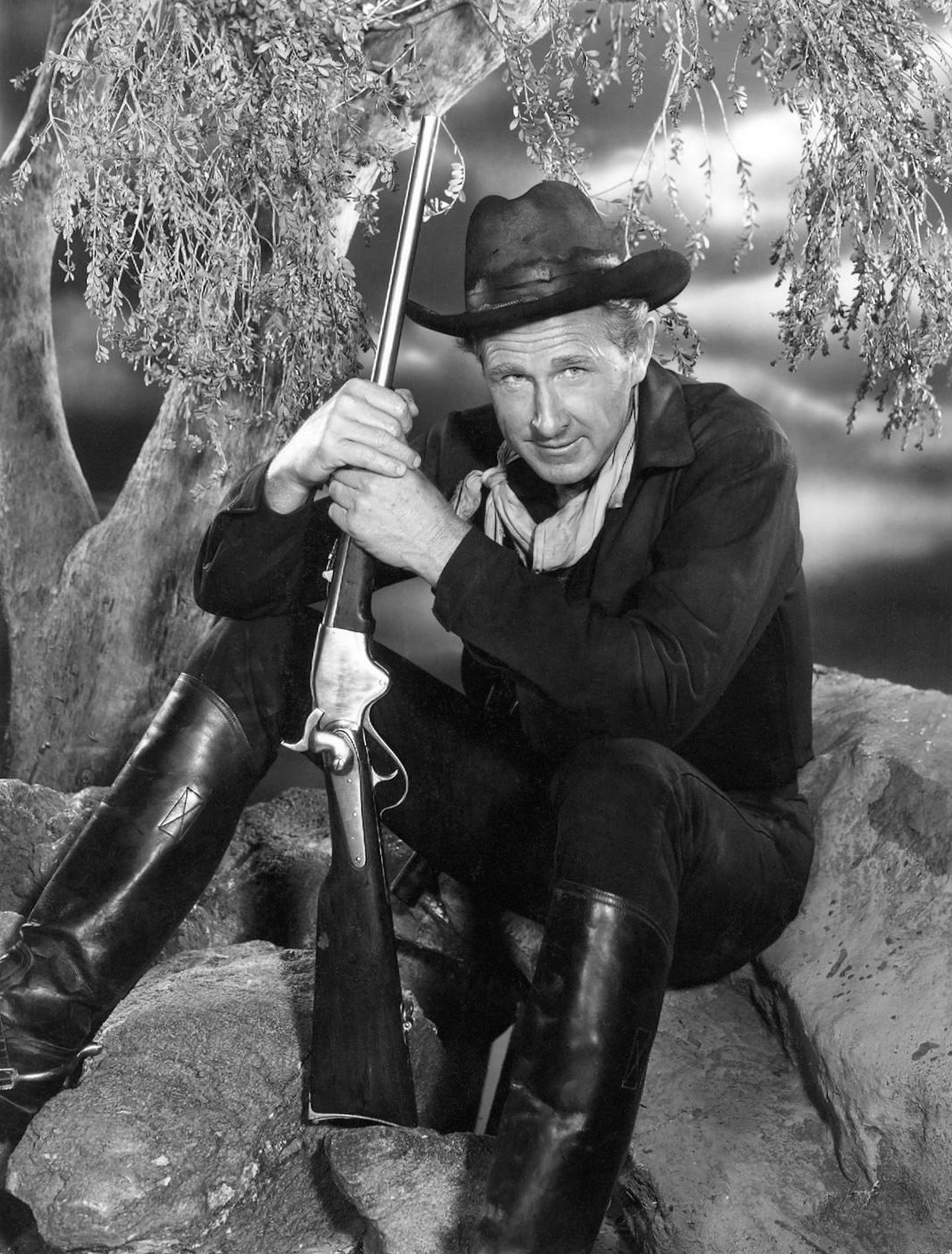
Bridges in The Loner

Bridges starred in the western series The Loner, which lasted one season from 1965 to 1966 and was created and often written by Rod Serling. The Loner earned solid reviews but was cancelled due to low ratings and a perception the show was too realistic or mature for audiences who expected escapist action from westerns.

Bridges returned to features with Around the World Under the Sea (1966). He guest starred in "Fakeout" for Mission Impossible (1966), and did a TV movie A Case of Libel (1968).

Bridges starred in some action films, Daring Game (1968) and Attack on the Iron Coast (1968), the latter for Ivan Tors. He did "The People Next Door" for CBS Playhouse (1968).

Bridges starred in some TV movies, The Silent Gun (1969), and Silent Night, Lonely Night (1969). He had a supporting role in The Happy Ending (1969) directed by Richard Brooks.

Bridges returned to Broadway as a replacement for the lead in Cactus Flower (1967).

=== Telemovies ===
Bridges was in heavy demand for TV movies such as The Love War (1970), Lost Flight (1970), Do You Take This Stranger? (1971), A Tattered Web (1971), and The Deadly Dream (1971). He starred in a short lived series San Francisco International Airport (1970/71) and had a supporting role in a feature, To Find a Man (1972).

Bridges had a (then) rare comedy role on Here's Lucy with "Lucy's Big Break" (1972). He continued in TV movies: Haunts of the Very Rich (1972), Trouble Comes to Town (1973), Crime Club (1973), Running Wild (1973), Death Race (1973), The Whirlwind (1974, with son Beau), and Stowaway to the Moon (1975).

=== Joe Forrester ===
Bridges starred in a short-lived Police Story spin-off Joe Forrester (1975–76).

Bridges played significant roles in several mini-series, including Roots, and How the West Was Won. He returned to TV movies: The Force of Evil (1978), Telethon (1978), The Great Wallendas (1978) and The Critical List (1978).

Bridges had a guest part in "The Living Legend" for Battlestar Galactica (1978) and went to Australia to make Shimmering Light (1978) with Beau. He had a supporting part in The Fifth Musketeer (1979) starring Beau and was in Disaster on the Coastliner (1979), Bear Island (1979) and This Year's Blonde (1980) (as Johnny Hyde)

=== Airplane! and 1980s ===
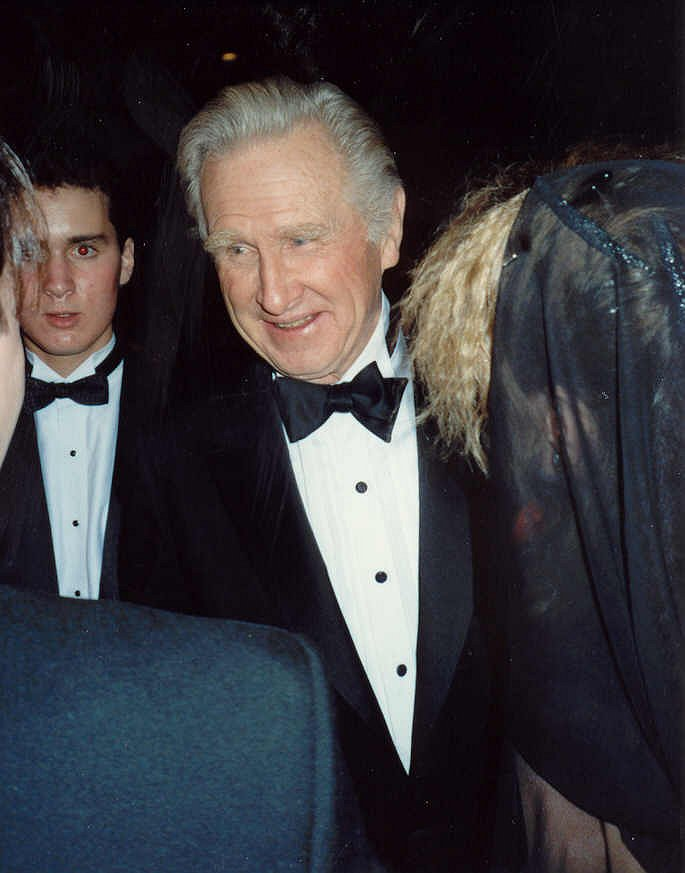
Bridges at the 61st Academy Awards in 1989

Bridges took on a memorable comedy role as air traffic controller Steve McCroskey in Airplane! (1980), a critically and commercially successful spoof of disaster films. Having been specifically recruited by the directors based on his straight-arrow screen image, Bridges took the role on the advice and encouragement of his children, and later reprised the role in the less well-received follow-up Airplane II: The Sequel (1982). He was also featured in a pair of comedies, Weekend Warriors (1986), and The Wild Pair, (1987) the latter of which he co-starred with and was directed by his son Beau. The following year, Bridges appeared with son Jeff in an uncredited role as U.S. Senator Homer S. Ferguson in Tucker: The Man and His Dream (1988), directed by Francis Ford Coppola. Bridges had other notable supporting roles in the romantic drama Winter People (1989) and the romantic comedy Cousins (1989).

On television, Bridges appeared in a number of popular miniseries such as East of Eden (1981), The Blue and the Gray (1982), George Washington (1984), Alice in Wonderland (1985), Dress Gray (1986), and North and South, Book II (1986). He also continued to make TV movies like Life of the Party: The Story of Beatrice (1982), Grace Kelly (1983), Grandpa, Will You Run with Me? (1983) The Thanksgiving Promise (1986), She Was Marked for Murder (1988), and Cross of Fire (1989).

Bridges also starred in a short-lived ABC TV series Paper Dolls (1984), and guest starred on other ABC network shows such as The Love Boat (1981), the soap opera Loving (1983), and Matt Houston (1983).

=== 1990s ===
Bridges starred in a short-lived series, Capital News (1990), for ABC. In 1990, he had a supporting role in Joe Versus the Volcano, and portrayed Harry Helmsley in the made-for-television movie, Leona Helmsley: The Queen of Mean.

Bridges was in Shining Time Station: 'Tis a Gift (1990) then reprised his comedy career with a supporting role in Hot Shots! (1991). He starred in a TV movie In the Nick of Time (1992) and was in Honey, I Blew Up the Kid (1992), Devlin (1992), and Mr. Bluesman (1993) before reprising his old role in Hot Shots! Part Deux (1993).

Bridges did Secret Sins of the Father (1994) with son Beau (who directed), and Cinderella ... Frozen in Time (1994). His last regular TV series was Harts of the West (1993–1994).

Bridges supported son Jeff in a big budget action film Blown Away (1994). He did "Sandkings" (1995) for The Outer Limits (1995) with Beau, The Other Woman (1995), Nothing Lasts Forever (1995), and The Deliverance of Elaine (1996) and did voice work on Peter and the Wolf (1995). He had a semi-regular part on Second Noah (1996).

He received a second Emmy Award nomination four decades after the first when he was nominated in 1998 for his role as Izzy Mandelbaum on Seinfeld.

Bridges served on the advisory board of the Los Angeles Student Film Institute.

Bridges also guest starred on Ned and Stacey.

Bridges's last roles were in Mafia! (1998) and Meeting Daddy (2000).

== Personal life ==
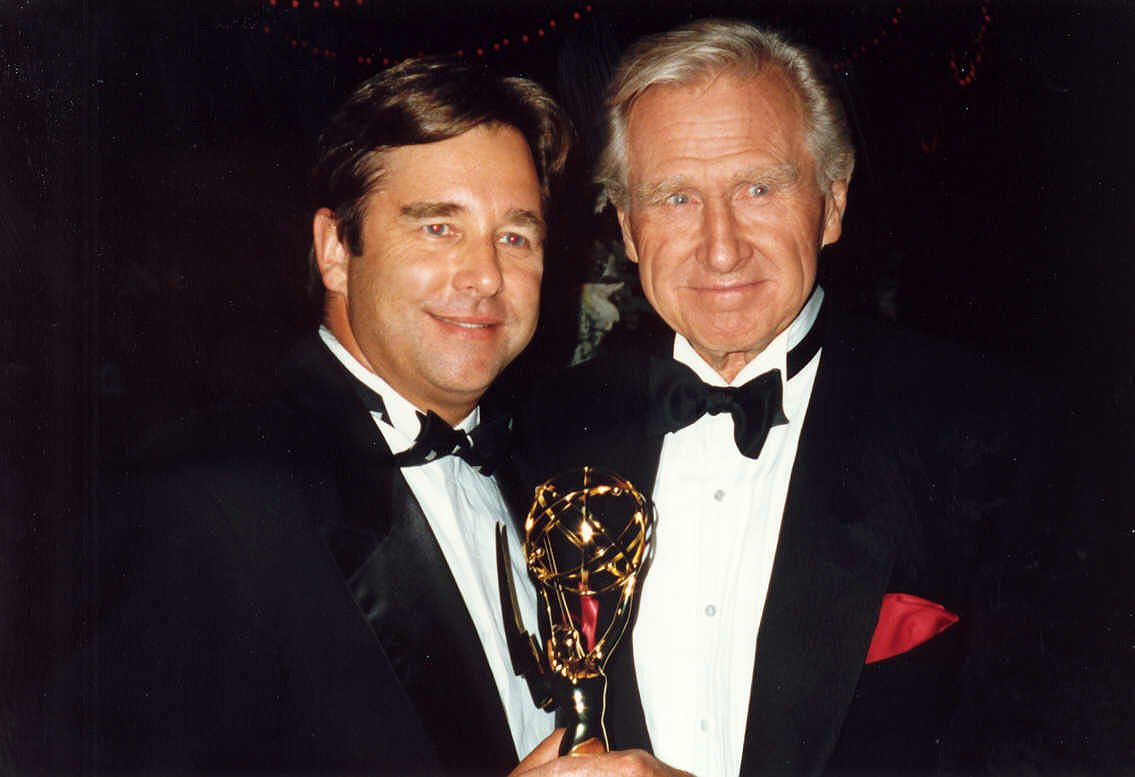
Bridges and his son Beau at the 44th Emmy Awards, August 30, 1992

Bridges met his wife, Dorothy Bridges (1915–2009), (née Simpson), in his fraternity; they married in 1938 in New York City. They had four children: actors Beau Bridges (born in 1941) and Jeff Bridges (born in 1949); a daughter, Lucinda Louise Bridges (born in October 1953); and another son, Garrett Myles Bridges, who died of Sudden Infant Death Syndrome on August 3, 1948. Actor Jordan Bridges is Beau's son and Lloyd's grandson. Dorothy and Lloyd exchanged vows again for their 50th wedding anniversary.

== Death ==
On March 10, 1998, Bridges died of natural causes at the age of 85.

=== Tributes ===
An episode ("The Burning") in the final Seinfeld season (1998) was dedicated to the memory of Lloyd Bridges. He had played the character of Izzy Mandelbaum in the episodes "The English Patient" in 1997 and "The Blood" later the same year.

Bridges's penultimate film, Jane Austen's Mafia!, which came out the year of his death, bears a dedication to him.

In 2011, Bridges was posthumously named as one of six recipients that year of the Lone Sailor Award, which honors former Coast Guard servicemen who forged successful careers as civilians. His sons Jeff and Beau also received the same award that year.

The Terranea Resort restaurant Nelson’s in Rancho Palos Verdes, California, is named after the character Lloyd Bridges played in Sea Hunt, Mike Nelson, which was filmed in the waters by the cliffs of Terranea.

== Filmography ==
Year	Film	Role	Director	Notes
1936	Dancing Feet	Young Man	Joseph Santley	uncredited
1936	Freshman Love	College Boy	William McGann	uncredited
1937	Lost Horizon	Uniformed Soldier / Officer	Frank Capra	uncredited
1941	I Was a Prisoner on Devil's Island	Rene		uncredited
1941	Harmon of Michigan	Ozzie	Charles Barton	
1941	Harvard, Here I Come!	Larry	Lew Landers	uncredited
1941	Here Comes Mr. Jordan	Co-pilot of Plane #22	Alexander Hall	uncredited
1941	Honolulu Lu	Desk Clerk	Charles Barton	uncredited
1941	Our Wife	Taxi Driver	John M. Stahl	uncredited
1941	Sing for Your Supper	Doc	Charles Barton	uncredited
1941	The Lone Wolf Takes a Chance	Johnny Baker	Sidney Salkow	
1941	The Medico of Painted Springs	Cowhand	Lambert Hillyer	uncredited
1941	The Royal Mounted Patrol	Hap Andrews	Lambert Hillyer	
1941	The Son of Davy Crockett	Sammy	Lambert Hillyer	uncredited
1941	They Dare Not Love	Blonde Officer	James Whale	uncredited
1941	Three Girls About Town	Reporter	Leigh Jason	uncredited
1941	Two Latins from Manhattan	Tommy Curtis	Charles Barton	
1941	You Belong to Me	Ski Patrol	Wesley Ruggles	uncredited
1942	Stand By All Networks	Slim Terry	Lew Landers	uncredited
1942	Submarine Raider	Submarine Engine Seaman		voice, uncredited
1942	A Man's World	Brown	Charles Barton	
1942	Alias Boston Blackie	Bus Driver	Lew Landers	uncredited
1942	Atlantic Convoy	Bert	Lew Landers	
1942	Blondie Goes to College	Ben Dixon		
1942	Cadets on Parade	Reporter	Lew Landers	uncredited
1942	Canal Zone	Recruit Baldwin	Lew Landers	
1942	Counter-Espionage	Waiter	Edward Dmytryk	uncredited
1942	Daring Young Man	Hans Muller	Frank R. Strayer	
1942	Flight Lieutenant	Cadet William 'Bill' Robinson	Sidney Salkow	uncredited
1942	North of the Rockies	Constable McDowell	Lambert Hillyer	
1942	Pardon My Gun	Henchman		uncredited
1942	Riders of the Northland	Alex	William Berke	
1942	Shut My Big Mouth	Skinny	Charles Barton	
1942	Sweetheart of the Fleet	Sailor	Charles Barton	
1942	The Great Glover			short
1942	The Spirit of Stanford	Don Farrell	Charles Barton	uncredited
1942	The Talk of the Town	Donald Forrester	George Stevens	uncredited
1942	The Wife Takes a Flyer	German Sergeant	Richard Wallace	uncredited
1942	Tramp, Tramp, Tramp	Guard	Charles Barton	uncredited
1942	Underground Agent	Chemist	Michael Gordon	uncredited
1942	West of Tombstone	Martin	Howard Bretherton	uncredited
1943	A Rookie's Cookie			short
1943	City Without Men	Coast Guard Helmsman	Sidney Salkow	uncredited
1943	Commandos Strike at Dawn	Young German Soldier	John Farrow	uncredited
1943	Crime Doctor's Strangest Case	Jimmy Trotter	Eugene Forde	
1943	Destroyer	2nd Fireman	William A. Seiter	uncredited
1943	Hail to the Rangers	Dave Kerlin	William Berke	
1943	His Wedding Scare	Train Conductor Charlie, Susie's 1st Husband		short
1943	One Dangerous Night	Airline Gate Attendant	Michael Gordon	uncredited
1943	Passport to Suez	Fritz	Andre de Toth	
1943	Sahara	Fred Clarkson	Zoltán Korda	
1943	The Heat's On	Andy Walker	Gregory Ratoff	
1943	There's Something About a Soldier		Alfred E. Green	
1943	They Stooge to Conga	Telephone Customer #2	Del Lord	short (uncredited)
1944	Riding West	Larry		uncredited
1944	Louisiana Hayride	Montague Price	Charles Barton	
1944	Once Upon a Time	Aviator Captain	Alexander Hall	uncredited
1944	Saddle Leather Law	Paul Edwards	Benjamin H. Kline	
1944	She's a Soldier Too	Charles Jones	William Castle	
1944	The Master Race	Frank	Herbert Biberman	
1945	A Walk in the Sun	Sgt. Ward	Lewis Milestone	
1945	Secret Agent X-9	Phil Corrigan	Ray Taylor	Secret Agent X-9
1945	Strange Confession	Dave	John Hoffman	
1946	Abilene Town	Henry Dreiser	Edwin L. Marin	
1946	Canyon Passage	Johnny Steele	Jacques Tourneur	
1946	Miss Susie Slagle's	Silas Holmes	John Berry	
1947	Ramrod	Red Cates	Andre de Toth	
1947	The Trouble with Women	Avery Wilson	Sidney Lanfield	
1947	Thunderbolt!	Pilot		voice
1947	Unconquered	Lt. Hutchins	Cecil B. DeMille	
1948	16 Fathoms Deep	Ray Douglas	Irving Allen	
1948	Moonrise	Jerry Sykes	Frank Borzage	
1948	Secret Service Investigator	Steve Mallory / Dan Redfern	R. G. Springsteen	
1949	Calamity Jane and Sam Bass	Joel Collins	George Sherman	
1949	Hideout	George Browning	Philip Ford	
1949	Home of the Brave	Finch	Mark Robson	
1949	Mr. Whitney Had a Notion	Eli Whitney		short
1949	Red Canyon	Virgil Cordt	George Sherman	
1949	Trapped	Tris Stewart	Richard Fleischer	
1950	Colt .45	Paul Donovan	Edwin L. Marin	
1950	Rocketship X-M	Col. Floyd Graham	Kurt Neumann	
1950	The Sound of Fury	Jerry Slocum	Cy Endfield	
1950	The White Tower	Mr. Hein	Ted Tetzlaff	
1951	Little Big Horn	Capt. Phillip Donlin	Charles Marquis Warren	
1951	The Whistle at Eaton Falls	Brad Adams	Robert Siodmak	
1951	Three Steps North	Frank Keeler	W. Lee Wilder	
1952	High Noon	Deputy Marshal Harvey Pell	Fred Zinnemann	
1952	Plymouth Adventure	Coppin	Clarence Brown	
1953	City of Bad Men	Gar Stanton	Harmon Jones	
1953	Last of the Comanches	Jim Starbuck	Andre de Toth	
1953	The Kid from Left Field	Pete Haines	Harmon Jones	
1953	The Limping Man	Frank Prior	Cy Endfield	
1953	The Tall Texan	Ben Trask	Elmo Williams	
1954	Pride of the Blue Grass	Jim	William Beaudine	
1954	Third Party Risk	Philip Graham	Daniel Birt	
1955	Apache Woman	Rex Moffett	Roger Corman	
1955	Wichita	Gyp Clements	Jacques Tourneur	
1956	The Rainmaker	Noah Curry	Joseph Anthony	
1956	Wetbacks	Jim Benson	Hank McCune	
1957	Ride Out for Revenge	Capt. George	Bernard Girard	
1958	The Goddess	Dutch Seymour	John Cromwell	
1962	A Pair of Boots	Adam Shepherd / Sgt. Otis		
1962	My Daddy Can Lick Your Daddy	Pappy Devlin		
1966	Around the World Under the Sea	Dr. Doug Standish	Andrew Marton	
1966	The World of Inner Space			short
1967	Wonderful World of Wheels			
1968	Attack on the Iron Coast	Major Jamie Wilson	Paul Wendkos	
1968	Daring Game	Vic Powers	László Benedek	
1969	Lost Flight	Captain Steve Bannerman	Leonard J. Horn	
1969	The Happy Ending	Sam	Richard Brooks	
1970	The Love War	Kyle	George McCowan	
1971	The Deadly Dream	Dr. Jim Hanley	Alf Kjellin	
1972	Haunts of the Very Rich	Dave Woodrough	Paul Wendkos	
1972	To Find a Man	Frank McCarthy	Buzz Kulik	
1973	Scuba!			
1973	Death Race	Hans Pimler	David Lowell Rich	
1973	Running Wild	Jeff Methune		
1979	Bear Island	Smithy	Don Sharp	
1979	The Fifth Musketeer	Aramis	Ken Annakin	
1980	Airplane!	Steve McCroskey	Zucker, Abrahams and Zucker	
1982	Airplane II: The Sequel	Steve McCroskey	Ken Finkleman	
1986	The Thanksgiving Promise	Stewart Larson	Beau Bridges	
1986	Weekend Warriors	Col. Archer	Bert Convy	
1987	I Am Joe's Heart	Joe's Heart (voice)		short
1987	The Wild Pair	Col. Heser	Beau Bridges	
1988	Tucker: The Man and His Dream	Sen. Homer Ferguson	Francis Ford Coppola	uncredited
1989	Cousins	Vince	Joel Schumacher	
1989	Winter People	William Wright	Ted Kotcheff	
1990	Joe Versus the Volcano	Graynamore	John Patrick Shanley	
1991	Hot Shots!	Adm. Thomas "Tug" Benson	Jim Abrahams	
1992	Earth and the American Dream			
1992	Honey, I Blew Up the Kid	Clifford Sterling	Randal Kleiser	
1993	Hot Shots! Part Deux	Pres. Thomas "Tug" Benson	Jim Abrahams	
1993	Mr. Bluesman	Bronski		
1994	Blown Away	Max O'Bannon	Stephen Hopkins	
1995	Peter and the Wolf	Grandfather	George DaughertyJean Flynn	
1998	Jane Austen's Mafia!	Vincenzo Cortino	Jim Abrahams	Released posthumously
2000	Meeting Daddy	Mr. Branson	Peter Gould	filmed in 1997; released posthumously
2002	From Russia to Hollywood: The 100-Year Odyssey of Chekhov and Shdanoff	Himself		scenes filmed in the 1990s

== Television work ==
Year	Title	Role	Notes
1952	Suspense	James	Episode: "Her Last Adventure"
1952-1956	Studio One	Various	3 episodes
1955	Crossroads	Fred	Episode: "Broadway Trust"
1955-1957	Climax!	Various	5 episodes
1956-1957	The Alcoa Hour	Alec Beggs/Danny Mayo	2 episodes
1956-1957	Studio 57	Walt James	2 episodes
1956-1957	Playhouse 90	Paul Fletcher/Earl Pfeiffer	2 episodes
1957-1961	Zane Grey Theater	Various	4 episodes
1957	The United States Steel Hour	Sgt. Walt Stebbins	Episode: "They Never Forget"
1958	The Frank Sinatra Show	Johnny Maitland	Episode: "A Time to Cry"
1958-1961	Sea Hunt	Mike Nelson	
1959	Westinghouse Desilu Playhouse	Allie Stein	Episode: "Lepke"
1960	Dick Powell's Zane Grey Theatre	Lt. Sam Kenyon	Episode: "Image of a Drawed Sword"
1961	The Dick Powell Show	Joe Montana	Episode: "Who Killed Judy Greer?"
1961	The DuPont Show with June Allyson	Captain Anderson	Episode: "Death on the Temple Bay"
1961	Checkmate	Howard Gentry/Robert Gentry	Episode: "The Two of Us"
1961	Alcoa Premiere	Lt. Wallace Brown	Episode: "The Fortress"
1962-1963	The Lloyd Bridges Show	Adam Shepherd/Sen. Guthrie/Jonathan Tatum/Various characters	
1963	Kraft Suspense Theatre	Mason Etheridge	Episode: "A Hero for Our Times"
1964	The Great Adventure	Wild Bill Hickok	Episode: "Wild Bill Hickok - the Legend and the Man"
1964	The Eleventh Hour	Leonard McCarty	Episode: "Cannibal Plants, They Eat You Alive"
1965-1966	The Loner	William Colton	
1965	Bob Hope Presents the Chrysler Theatre	Lt. Frank Menke	Episode: "Exit from a Plane in Flight"
1966	Mission: Impossible	Anastas Poltroni	Episode: "Fakeout"
1968	A Case of Libel	Dennis Corcoran	TV film
1968	CBS Playhouse	Arthur Mason	Episode: "The People Next Door"
1969	Lost Flight	Captain Steve Bannerman	TV film
1969	Silent Night, Lonely Night	John Sparrow	TV film
1970	The Love War	Kyle	TV film
1970	San Francisco International Airport	Jim Conrad	
1971	The Deadly Dream	Dr. Jim Hanley	TV film
1972	Haunts of the Very Rich	Dave Woodrough	TV film
1973	Death Race	Hans Pimler	TV film
1974	Benjamin Franklin	Benjamin Franklin, the diplomat	2 episodes
1974-1975	Police Story	Joe Forrester/Sgt. Wolf Bozeman	2 episodes
1975	Stowaway to the Moon	Charlie Englehardt	TV film
1975-1976	Joe Forrester	Joe Forrester	
1977	Quinn Martin's Tales of the Unexpected	Dr. Carrington	Episode: "The Force of Evil"
1977	Roots	Evan Brent	2 episodes
1978	How the West Was Won	Orville Gant	4 episodes
1978	Shimmering Light	Sean Pearse	TV film
1978	Battlestar Galactica	Commander Cain	Episode: "The Living Legend"
1979	Disaster on the Coastliner	Al Mitchell	TV film
1981	The Love Boat	William Otis Farnsworth	2 episodes
1981	East of Eden	Samuel Hamilton	Miniseries
1982	The Blue and the Gray	Ben Geyser	2 episodes
1983	Matt Houston	Virgil Wade/Wade Matlock	Episode: "Heritage"
1983	Grace Kelly	Jack Kelly	TV film
1983	Loving	Jack Forbes	Pilot
1984	Paper Dolls	Grant Harper	
1984	George Washington	Caleb Quinn	Miniseries
1985	Alice in Wonderland	White Knight	Part 2: "Through the Looking Glass"
1986	The Magical World of Disney	Stewart Larson	Episode: "The Thanksgiving Promise"
1986	North and South	Confederate President Jefferson Davis	Book 2: Love and War
1986	Dress Gray	Gen. Axel Rylander	Miniseries
1990	Shining Time Station	Mr. Nicholas	Special: "'Tis a Gift"
1990	Capital News	Jonathan Joseph "Jo Jo" Turner	
1991	In the Nick of Time	Santa Claus	TV film
1993-1994	Harts of the West	Jake Terrel	7 episodes
1995	The Other Woman	Jacob	TV film
1995	The Outer Limits	Col. Kress	Episode: "The Sandkings"
1997	Seinfeld	Izzy Mandelbaum	2 episodes: "The English Patient" and "The Blood"
