= Jordan Bridges =

American actor (born 1973)

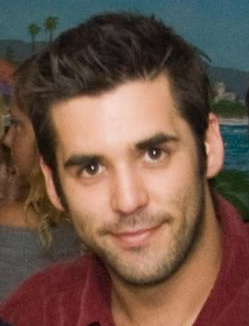
- Bridges in 2008
- Born: November 13, 1973 (age 52); Los Angeles County, California, U.S.
- Education: Bard College
- Occupation: Actor
- Years active: 1982–present
- Spouse: Caroline Sherman Eastman (m. 2002)
- Children: 2
- Parent: Beau Bridges
- Relatives: Jeff Bridges (uncle); Lloyd Bridges (grandfather); Dorothy Bridges (grandmother)

Jordan Bridges (born November 13, 1973) is an American actor, best known as Frankie Rizzoli on Rizzoli & Isles (2010–2016).

== Early life and education ==
Bridges was born in Los Angeles County, California, and is the son of actor Beau Bridges and Julie Bridges. He is the nephew of Jeff Bridges and the grandson of Lloyd Bridges and Dorothy Bridges. Bridges' maternal grandfather, Marvin Landfield, was the son of Russian-Jewish immigrants.

Bridges first acted professionally at the age of five in the television film The Kid from Nowhere (1982), directed by his father. After a break he returned once more in the television film The Thanksgiving Promise (1986), starring the entire Bridges family.

Not wanting to be a child actor, he left acting and attended L.A.'s Oakwood School. The school had a strong emphasis on the arts, which rekindled Bridges interest in acting. He followed it up as a theater major and literature minor at New York's Bard College.

Before earning his bachelor's degree, Bridges spent his junior year in England studying at the London Academy of Music and Dramatic Art, living in a basement flat in Chelsea and attending West End theatre productions on free passes.

== Career ==
Although classically trained, Bridges worked as a waiter in New York and Los Angeles for several years each before he started getting roles in films, television series, and theater. He starred in the short-lived NBC series Conviction (2006) as Nick Potter, a lawyer from an "old money" family of prominence, who leaves his job at a private law firm to join the Manhattan District Attorney's Office.

Bridges is also known for his starring roles in the 2002 film New Suit, the 2004 film Samantha: An American Girl Holiday, and the 2009 Love Comes Softly movie series films Love Takes Wing and Love Finds a Home, as well as a recurring role on the TV series Dawson's Creek. He also had a guest role in the two-part, fourth-season-premiere episode of Charmed, as Paige's boyfriend, Shane. He played the recurring character Tom Hastings in the Bionic Woman series.

He also played supporting roles in the films Drive Me Crazy (1999), Frequency (2000), Happy Campers (2001), and Mona Lisa Smile (2003). In A Holiday Engagement (2011) he plays David, a man hired to impersonate a woman's fiancé to her family over Thanksgiving. Similarly, in Family Plan (2005) he plays Buck, a man hired to impersonate a woman's husband to her boss for the night.

Bridges appeared in the TNT drama series Rizzoli & Isles, which premiered in July 2010 and concluded in September 2016.

== Personal life ==
Bridges married artist-inventor Caroline Sherman Eastman in 2002 at Burning Man and again on January 2, 2003, at a small ceremony in Kauai, Hawaii. They have two children.

== Filmography ==
=== Film ===
Year	Film	Role	Note
1986	The Thanksgiving Promise	Travis Tilby	Entire Bridges family involved
1999	Drive Me Crazy	Eddie Lampell	
2000	Frequency	Graham "Gib" Gibson	
2001	Happy Campers	Adam	
2002	New Suit	Kevin Taylor	
2003	Mona Lisa Smile	Spencer Jones	
2004	Samantha: An American Girl Holiday	Uncle Gard	
2007	Turn the River	Brad	
2009	A Good Funeral	Marty	
2011	J. Edgar	Labor Dept. Lawyer	
2012	Crew 2 Crew	Mino	
2013	Phantom	Sonar Operator	
2013	Rushlights	Earl	
2018	Den of Thieves	Lobbin' Bob	

=== Television ===
Year	Title	Role	Notes
2001	Charmed	Shane	Episode: "Charmed Again Pt. 1" & "Charmed Again Pt. 2"
2001–2002	Dawson's Creek	Oliver Chirchick	7 episodes; Recurring role (Season 5)
2004	Law & Order: Criminal Intent	Jack Cadogan	Episode: "F.P.S."
2005	CSI: NY	Alex Weston	Episode: "YoungBlood"
2005	Family Plan	Buck	TV film
2006	Conviction	Nick Potter	13 episodes; Main role (Season 1)
2007	Bionic Woman	Tom Hastings	3 episodes; Guest role (Season 1)
2009	Without a Trace	Zack Porter	Episode: "Voir Dire"
2009	Dollhouse	Nicolas Bashford	Episode: "Haunted"
2009	Love Takes Wing	Lee Owens	TV film
2009	Love Finds a Home	Lee Owens	TV film
2010–2016	Rizzoli & Isles	Frankie Rizzoli Jr.	104 episodes; Main role (Seasons 1–7)
2011	A Holiday Engagement	David	TV film
2017	Law & Order: Special Victims Unit	Roger Littrell	1 episode; Guest role (Season 18)
2017–2018	Gone	Neil Pruitt	5 episodes; Recurring role
2017	Christmas at Holly Lodge	Evan	TV film (Hallmark)
2019	True Love Blooms	Chace Devine	TV film (Hallmark)
2022	WeCrashed	Jamie Hodari	Miniseries, 1 episode
2023	The Blacklist	Todd Wagner	Episode: "The Hat Trick"
2024–2026	Palm Royale	Perry Donahue	Recurring
