= The Other Woman (1995 film) =

- Written by: Nancey Silvers
- Directed by: Gabrielle Beaumont
- Starring: Jill Eikenberry; Laura Leighton; Lloyd Bridges; James Read; Sarah Martineck; Lindsay Parker; Rosemary Forsyth; Monica Parker; Michael Covert; Willy Parsons; Gloria Camden; David Jean Thomas; Michele Harrell; Frank von Zerneck Jr.
- Theme music composer: Peter Manning Robinson
- Country of origin: United States
- Original language: English

Production
- Producers: Robert M. Sertner; Frank von Zerneck; Randy Sutter; Nancey Silvers
- Editors: Stephen Adrianson; Tod Feuerman
- Running time: 89 minutes

Original release
- Network: CBS
- Release: March 26, 1995

The Other Woman (also known as Mothers and Daughters), is a 1995 television film. Nancey Silvers was nominated for the Humanitas Prize in the "Prime Time 90 Minute" category for writing the film.

== Plot ==
After Tessa Bryan (Jill Eikenberry) is diagnosed with terminal pancreatic cancer, she attempts to ensure that her two young daughters, Lara and Kate, accept her ex-husband Michael's second wife Carolyn. To do so, she takes them on a trip across the country to her father's ranch.

== Cast ==
- Jill Eikenberry as Tessa: A 48 year-old mother to Lara and Kate who is diagnosed with late-stage terminal cancer and is Michael's ex-wife.
- Laura Leighton as Carolyn Bryan: A 27 year old model who wrecked Tessa and Michael's marriage. She becomes Michael's new wife and future stepmother to Lara and Kate.
- James Read as Michael Bryan: A 42 year-old successful businessman, father to Lara and Kate, Tessa's ex-husband and Carolyn's husband.
- Sarah Martineck as Lara Bryan: Tessa and Michael’s biological daughter and Carolyn's stepdaughter.
- Lindsay Parker as Kate Bryan: Tessa and Michael’s biological daughter and Carolyn's stepdaughter.
- Lloyd Bridges as Jacob: Tessa's father.
