= The Tall Texan =

1953 film by Elmo Williams

- Directed by: Elmo Williams
- Written by: Elizabeth Reinhardt; Samuel Roeca
- Produced by: Thomas F. Woods
- Starring: Lloyd Bridges; Lee J. Cobb; Marie Windsor; Luther Adler
- Cinematography: Joseph F. Biroc
- Edited by: Elmo Williams
- Music by: Bert Shefter
- Production company: T.F. Woods Productions
- Distributed by: Lippert Pictures
- Release date: February 13, 1953 (US)
- Running time: 84 minutes
- Country: United States
- Language: English
- Budget: $102,000

The Tall Texan is a 1953 American Western film directed by Elmo Williams and starring Lloyd Bridges, Lee J. Cobb, Marie Windsor and Luther Adler.

It was the only film directed by Elmo Williams, who said he had 50% of the profits but gave it away to attract the star cast. He said the film made a lot of money but he "never saw a dime".

Williams says he asked producer Robert L. Lippert for some extra money. "I thought we had a tag for a couple of thousand dollars", he said. "He said, 'I don't care if you have a beginning, a middle or an end- you're going to finish the picture now I'm calling back part of the crew.' And he did."

== Plot ==
Sheriff Chanbourne (Samuel Herrick) transports convict Ben Trask (Lloyd Bridges) to El Paso in a covered wagon. The wagon also carries sea captain Theodore Bess (Lee J. Cobb) and married couple Laura (Marie Windsor) and Jerry Niblett (Dean Train). The group comes upon a wounded Native American named Jaqui, banished by his tribe, who agrees to lead them to gold. But then the tribe attacks the wagon, killing Jerry and wounding Chadbourne. Ben is freed to help, but the group's troubles have only begun.

== Cast ==
- Lloyd Bridges as Ben Trask
- Lee J. Cobb as Capt. Theodore Bess
- Marie Windsor as Laura Thompson
- Luther Adler as Joshua 'Josh' Tinnen
- Syd Saylor as Carney
- Samuel Herrick as Sheriff Chadborune
- George Steele as Jaqui
- Dean Train as Jerome 'Jerry' Niblett

== Bibliography ==
- Henryk Hoffmann. Western Movie References in American Literature. McFarland, 2012.
