= Family Plan (2005 film) =

- Genre: Comedy
- Written by: Rick Gitelson
- Directed by: David S. Cass Sr.
- Starring: Tori Spelling; Jordan Bridges
- Music by: David Kitay
- Country of origin: United States
- Original language: English

Production
- Producers: Robert Halmi, Jr. Albert T. Dickerson III
- Editor: Jennifer Jean Cacavas
- Running time: 120 minutes
- Production company: Mat IV Productions

Original release
- Network: Hallmark Channel
- Release: February 12, 2005

Family Plan is a 2005 American television comedy film directed by David S. Cass Sr., written by Rick Gitelson, and starring Tori Spelling and Greg Germann. It filmed in Los Angeles by Mat IV Productions in association with Alpine Media and Larry Levinson Productions and was presented by Hallmark Entertainment. It premiered on February 12, 2005 on the Hallmark Channel, as part of their Valentine's Day celebration. This is the feature film debut of Chloë Grace Moretz.

== Plot ==
Charlie works for a company that is taken over by Walcott, who believes family values are a priority. Career-driven Charlie does a little fibbing when under the pressure of Walcott's standards, and believes she's in the clear. But when Walcott invites himself over for dinner, she borrows her friend's house and daughter and hires actor Buck to play her husband for the evening. The one-night "act" turns into a full-time gig when her boss decides to rent the house next door for the summer, forcing Charlie and Buck to stay together in the fake lifestyle she created.

== Cast ==
- Tori Spelling as Charlie
  - Chloë Grace Moretz as Young Charlie
- Greg Germann as Walcott
- Jordan Bridges as Buck
- Kali Rocha as Stacy
- Kate Vernon as Victoria
- Jon Polito as Gold
- Christopher Cass as Troy
- Abigail Breslin as Nicole

== Reception ==
Hal Erickson from All Movie Guide wrote: "Family Plan will probably seem a breath of fresh air to anyone who hasn't seen such movies as Picture Perfect and Good Neighbor Sam, or who can't remember the mid-1960s TV sitcom Occasional Wife." The movie premiered with a 1.4 household rating and was viewed by more than 1.9 million unduplicated viewers. It was also part of Hallmark Channel's third-highest day to date, and was ranked among the top 10 in the time period for household rating (#10).
