= Meeting Daddy =

- Directed by: Peter Gould
- Written by: Peter Gould
- Starring: Lloyd Bridges; Josh Charles; Alexandra Wentworth; Walter Olkewicz; Kristy Swanson; Beau Bridges
- Production companies: CineTel Films; Mas Macho Inc.
- Distributed by: Paramount Home Video
- Release date: June 27, 2000
- Running time: 90 minutes
- Language: English

Meeting Daddy is a 2000 film written and directed by Peter Gould. It is the last of actor Lloyd Bridges' 160 films and was posthumously released.

== Plot ==
The plot involves a struggling New York-based screenwriter travelling to Savannah, Georgia, to meet his girlfriend's eccentric family. It also explores themes of aging.

== Cast ==
- Lloyd Bridges - Mr. Branson
- Josh Charles - Peter Silverblatt
- Alexandra Wentworth - Melanie Branson
- Beau Bridges - Larry Branson
- Walter Olkewicz Dink Branson
- Kristy Swanson - Laurel Lee
- Edie McClurg - Dot
- Cindy Bridges - Becky Sue Branson (as Lucinda Bridges-Cunningham)
- Christopher T. Gray - Taxi Driver
- Don Perry - Mr. Sulak
