= Conviction (2006 TV series) =

2006 American legal drama television series

- Genre: Legal drama
- Created by: Dick Wolf
- Starring: Stephanie March; Eric Balfour; Jordan Bridges; Milena Govich; Anson Mount; Julianne Nicholson; J. August Richards
- Country of origin: United States
- Original language: English
- No. of seasons: 1
- No. of episodes: 13

Production
- Executive producers: Rick Eid; Dick Wolf; Peter Jankowski
- Producer: Carter Harris
- Camera setup: Single-camera
- Running time: 45–48 minutes
- Production companies: Wolf Films; NBC Universal Television Studio

Original release
- Network: NBC
- Release: March 3 – May 19, 2006

Related
- Law & Order franchise

Conviction is an American legal drama television series that aired on NBC as a mid-season replacement from March 3 to May 19, 2006. The cast includes Stephanie March reprising her Law & Order: Special Victims Unit role as Alexandra Cabot. In the series, Cabot returns to New York City and becomes a Bureau Chief ADA supervising a group of young but talented assistant district attorneys after a stint in the Witness Protection Program. Other cast members include Eric Balfour, Anson Mount, Jordan Bridges, Julianne Nicholson, Milena Govich, and J. August Richards.

Prior to the show's debut, creator Dick Wolf remarked, "Conviction will be a 'charactercedural', we will be dealing extensively with characters' back stories and personal lives. I am delighted with the extraordinary cast we have assembled, which will give the show depth and emotional intensity."

Conviction's premiere came precisely one year after the premiere of the short-lived Law & Order: Trial by Jury, which was also created by Dick Wolf and also aired on NBC (in filming, Conviction used many of the Trial by Jury sets). On February 21, 2006, the pilot episode of Conviction was made available for free download through the iTunes store; the free download was available until March 3, the date of the NBC premiere. The pilot and all other aired episodes are now available for purchase.

NBC announced the series would not be renewed for a second season on May 14, 2006, having been routinely beaten in the ratings by CBS's math police procedural Numb3rs.

== Cast and characters ==
- Stephanie March as Alexandra Cabot

In Conviction, Bureau Chief ADA Cabot is engaged, and has had a fling with Deputy District Attorney Jim Steele, which was alluded to in Episode 5. Since her time as an ADA with the Special Victims Unit (2000–2003), Alex's ideals and the way she does her job have changed, becoming more of a "politician" – something that often angers her staff, particularly Jessica Rossi. During the show's run, it was unexplained why Cabot was able to leave the Witness Protection Program, which she joined in 2003, after her life was threatened by a drug lord whose associate she had tried to prosecute. In a 2009 episode of SVU ("Lead"), in which March guest starred as Alexandra Cabot, it was revealed that the drug lord, Cesar Velez, died in prison, and Liam Connors, an assassin hired by Velez to kill her, was extradited to his native Ireland. No longer in Witness Protection, she had been back in the Manhattan DA's office for the past three years, which accounted for her reappearance on Conviction in 2006.

- Anson Mount as Jim Steele

Jim Steele is the Deputy Bureau Chief ADA whose best friend, Mike Randolph, is murdered by drug dealers in the pilot episode of Conviction. Jim is strong-willed and determined to avenge his friend's death. He is shown to have an adversarial relationship with Cabot after she decides to plead out his friend's murderer. Jim is tough on his subordinates, but he is secretly proud of them. He is having an affair with Jessica Rossi, which was private until the media exploited it in an attempt by a woman on trial to detract from Steele's credibility and portray him in a negative light. It is also implied that Cabot and Steele had a sexual relationship, as seen in the episode "Savasana".

- Eric Balfour as Brian Peluso

Brian Peluso is a laid-back and irresponsible ADA that seems to be heavily into partying but is very invested in his clients. He has sex with a number of different women whom he does not seem to care about, something that is seen as a defense mechanism because when he does open up to women, they often let him down. Peluso confesses to being in love with Finn in "Hostage". There are subtle references to a potential substance abuse problem, and he has a problem with gambling. He is often seen drinking Red Bull.

- J. August Richards as Billy Desmond

Billy Desmond is smart, politically motivated, and hasn't lost a case during his three years at the DA's office. Initially, he appears to care more about winning cases and his political stature, but over the course of the first season, it became evident that Billy will not compromise the law or the DA's office for either his track record or his aspirations. Billy appears to be closest to Finn and Peluso, who he is seen to go out with after hours, but he also has hit a club or two with new co-worker, Potter.

- Milena Govich as Jessica Rossi

Jessica Rossi is a young ADA who comes from a poor family. In the pilot episode, she is shown fighting with her brother after he asks her for a loan. We learn later that Jessica's father is abusive to her mother and has been for a long time. She is a fierce and often unrelenting ADA who frequently goes over her bosses' heads and takes big risks to punish the criminals she prosecutes. Jessica, along with Christina Finn, is particularly affected by the death of Mike Randolph. She is having an affair with her superior, Jim Steele. Jessica mentions to Christina that she lost her first court case.

- Julianne Nicholson as Christina Finn

Christina Finn is an inexperienced ADA who has been with the DA's office for two years. She is particularly nervous about her first case, to the point that she becomes physically ill. Her first case, along with the death of her mentor, Mike Randolph, take a toll on Christina, although in the end she wins her case. Though she has limited trial experience, she is a quick learner, and despite some mistakes, she shows great proficiency. While sitting second chair to Steele in a murder trial, she convinces him that it is necessary that he allow for her to give the closing argument, else they would be certain to lose, due to the fact that the defendant had reverted to numerous means of undermining Steele throughout the trial. Her closing argument wins them the trial. Christina is flirtatious with Brian Peluso.

- Jordan Bridges as Nick Potter

Nick Potter is a new and inexperienced ADA. He graduated in the middle of his class from New York University (NYU) Law School, and he comes from an "old money" family of prominence. In the pilot episode, he leaves his high-paying job at a private law firm, Cromwell Moore, for a position at the Manhattan District Attorney's Office. Nick is apparently attracted to Jessica Rossi; however, she is having an affair with Jim Steele. Nick is an idealist who wants to help those around him in whatever way he can, but his idealism and naïveté put him at odds with Steele's more aggressive and assertive nature. Nick is inadvertently responsible for the death of Jim's best friend, Mike Randolph. Although nobody else in the office believes Nick will last more than three months, Jessica Rossi has confidence in him and takes him under her wing. Since he is the new guy, he is also the target of pranks by the other members of the office (one that had him put a dress on to help finish up a hoax line up). Nick is the victim of a robbery, where he is brutally beaten, and the event haunts him to the point where his professionalism is brought into question.

== Episodes ==
| No. | Title | Directed by | Written by | Original release date | Prod. code |
|---|---|---|---|---|---|
| 1 | "Pilot" | Matt Reeves | Rick Eid, Walon Green, James Grissom | March 3, 2006 | 101 |
On Nick Potter's first day as an assistant district attorney, a fellow ADA is gunned down. Guest star: Fred Dalton Thompson as DA Arthur Branch.
| 2 | "Denial" | Norberto Barba | Rick Eid | March 10, 2006 | 102 |
Steele must charge a 14-year-old-boy, who murdered his brother, as an adult.
| 3 | "Breakup" | Randall Zisk | Greg Plageman | March 17, 2006 | 103 |
Finn investigates the suspicious suicide of a 12-year-old girl whose mother said her daughter was dying of cancer, but her autopsy shows otherwise.
| 4 | "Indebted" | Vincent Misiano | Carter Harris | March 24, 2006 | 104 |
Desmond is enlisted to prosecute a superstar rap producer charged with murder. Guest star: Will Chase as Detective Dave Lemanski.
| 5 | "Savasana" | Caleb Deschanel | Gavin Harris, Pamela J. Wechsler | March 31, 2006 | 105 |
Finn gets dragged into a tragic shaken baby case and the decision to pull life support from the infant. Guest star: Allan Miller as Judge.
| 6 | "Madness" | Caleb Deschanel | Walon Green | April 7, 2006 | 108 |
Billy Desmond's routine shift at a psychiatric ward turns the system upside down. Brian Peluso's girlfriend pressures him.
| 7 | "True Love" | Jeffrey Reiner | Rick Eid | April 11, 2006 | 107 |
Nick Potter is robbed and beaten at gunpoint after trying to get a witness to testify. Brian Peluso gets ready to move in with his girlfriend. Guest star: Gregory Jbara as Judge Herman Zemit.
| 8 | "Downhill" | Michael Fresco | David Mills | April 14, 2006 | 109 |
Potter takes on an easy case until a Parish Priest asks him to drop the case; Desmond networks with an exclusive group of upwardly mobile black men; Cabot and Rossi are at odds over a defendant in a rape case; and Finn gets caught up in a landlord/tenant dispute.
| 9 | "The Wall" | Steven DePaul | Laurie Arent, Greg Plageman | April 28, 2006 | 110 |
Desmond and Steele face an uphill battle when they prosecute a case stemming from the death of a teen in a choking game. Guest star: Ken Howard as Judge Hanson.
| 10 | "Deliverance" | Vincent Misiano | Robert Nathan, Pamela J. Wechsler | May 5, 2006 | 111 |
A respected female attorney kills her husband, and goes head-to-head against Jim Steele when she decides to defend herself in the courtroom.
| 11 | "Indiscretion" | Elodie Keene | Laurie Arent | May 12, 2006 | 106 |
Jim tries to prosecute a rape case, but the plaintiff's father stands in the way. Nick takes over an easy drug case from Jessica, but bungles it. Guest star: Lane Smith Jr. as Danny Peters.
| 12 | "180.80" | Norberto Barba | Carter Harris, Gavin Harris | May 19, 2006 | 112 |
A club's bouncer is the prime suspect when a young woman is murdered after leaving an after-hours bar.
| 13 | "Hostage" | Constantine Makris | Rick Eid, Walon Green | May 19, 2006 | 113 |
Two suspects take the courtroom hostage, and try to negotiate their way out using members from the DA's Office.

== Ratings ==
| Season | Episodes | Timeslot (EST) | Season premiere | Season finale | TV season | Ranking | Viewers (in millions) |
|---|---|---|---|---|---|---|---|
| 1 | 13 | Fridays 10:00 p.m. | March 3, 2006 | May 19, 2006 | 2005–2006 | #88 | 7.7 |

== Cancellation and aftermath ==
Conviction lost all of its Friday night ratings battles to CBS' Numb3rs. The last minute addition of Alexandra Cabot resulted in what was perceived as an unflattering and out-of-character portrayal. Also, despite Dick Wolf's claim of keeping the story character driven and giving detailed backgrounds, much of Cabot's character was not developed or explained.

The cancellation also came as the second legal drama failure for Dick Wolf, the first being Law & Order: Trial by Jury. Coincidentally, the show reused several of TBJ's sets.

Conviction averaged 7.7 million viewers overall (placing 73 for the season), 2.5 mill. in the 18–49 demo (placing 86), and 8 share. In contrast, the competing show, Numb3rs, averaged 11.7 million viewers overall (placing 31), 3.3 mill. in the 18–49 demo (placing 56), and 10 share.

Nevertheless, two actresses from the series have moved on to become lead characters in other Law & Order series. Milena Govich appeared on the original Law & Order as Det. Nina Cassady in its 17th season, having first appeared on Law & Order as a guest star in 2005. Julianne Nicholson, who played the meek Christina Finn, appears as Megan Wheeler on Law & Order: Criminal Intent. Nicholson had previously guest starred on the original Law & Order in the episode "All My Children" in 2001.

== Broadcast history ==
=== Overseas broadcasts ===
Conviction has aired on Five US and Hallmark Channel in the United Kingdom. In March 2008, the show debuted in Australia, on Network Ten's Ten HD channel.

=== Re-runs ===
Re-runs were shown on the now defunct Universal HD and are currently shown on Hulu in the United States.

=== DVD release ===
| DVD name | Cover art | Release date | Special Feature |
|---|---|---|---|
| Conviction: The Complete Series | | August 22, 2006 | Seven profiles: Stephanie March as Alexandra Cabot; Anson Mount as Jim Steele; Julianne Nicholson as Christina Finn; J. August Richards as Billy Desmond; Eric Balfour as Brian Peluso; Jordan Bridges as Nick Potter; Milena Govich as Jessica Rossi |
