= Dorothy Bridges =

American actress (1915–2009)

- Born: Dorothy Louise Simpson; September 19, 1915; Worcester, Massachusetts, U.S.
- Died: February 16, 2009 (aged 93); Los Angeles, California, U.S.
- Other name: Dorothy Dean
- Occupations: Actress, poet
- Years active: 1921–2009
- Spouse: Lloyd Bridges (m. 1938; died 1998)
- Children: 4, including Beau and Jeff
- Relatives: Jordan Bridges (grandson)

Dorothy Louise Bridges (née Simpson; September 19, 1915 – February 16, 2009) was an American actress and poet. Bridges was the matriarch of an acting family, which included her husband, Lloyd Bridges; two of their three sons, Beau Bridges and Jeff Bridges; and her grandson, Jordan Bridges. Bridges was sometimes credited as Dorothy Dean.

== Early life ==
Bridges was born Dorothy Louise Simpson in Worcester, Massachusetts. Her father was an immigrant from the United Kingdom, born and raised in Liverpool, England. Her mother was of Irish and Swiss-German ancestry. Her family moved to Los Angeles when she was two years old. Bridges made her film debut in the movie Finders Keepers.

She attended the University of California, Los Angeles (UCLA) where she met her future husband, Lloyd Bridges, while acting in a small theatrical play on campus. Lloyd Bridges, who was a UCLA upperclassman at the time, appeared in the production as her "leading man."

The couple married in 1938 in New York City. Dorothy and Lloyd Bridges remained married for 60 years, until he died in 1998 at the age of 85. They had four children: Beau Vernet, Garrett Myles, Jeffrey Leon, and Lucinda Louise. Garrett died of sudden infant death syndrome on August 3, 1948.

Bridges and her husband moved to New York City, where they continued to pursue their acting studies and careers. Dorothy and Lloyd Bridges both studied under the acting teacher Michael Chekhov.

They returned to Hollywood in the early 1940s when Lloyd Bridges was signed to Columbia Pictures.

== Career ==
Bridges occasionally returned to acting throughout her life, often in roles where she was able to work with members of her family. She was sometimes credited as Dorothy Dean. She appeared in Sea Hunt, a television series which starred her husband. Bridges also appeared in The Thanksgiving Promise, a 1986 television movie directed by her son, Beau Bridges, and the 1989 film, See You in the Morning, which co-starred her son, Jeff Bridges. Dorothy Bridges credits also included the 1993 television movie, Secret Sins of the Father, which was directed by Beau Bridges, who cast other members of the Bridges family in main and supporting roles.

In addition to raising her children, Bridges was their first drama teacher. She encouraged them to "pretend" for an hour each day. Jeff said that the playtime "pretend" games were "basically the basis of acting". Jeff Bridges notes that both his parents studied under Michael Chekhov and that "and a lot of things my mom learned with him were passed down to all of us". Two of her sons, Jeff and Beau, and grandson, Jordan, ultimately became actors while her daughter, Lucinda, is an artist.

Bridges also wrote poetry, later publishing some of her work. She wrote love poems to her husband every Valentine's Day during their 59-year marriage.

Bridges released her memoirs, You Caught Me Kissing: A Love Story, in 2005. Much of the book centered on her marriage. It included commentary from her children and family photos. Bridges was 89 years old at the time of the book's release.

== Death ==
Bridges died of natural causes in Holmby Hills, Los Angeles, on February 16, 2009, in the same home where she and her husband raised their children. She was 93 years old. She was survived by her brother, two sons, one daughter, eleven grandchildren, and two great-grandchildren.

Her son Jeff called her the "hub" of their family in an interview with the Los Angeles Times following her death.
