= Holiday Engagement =

2011 film directed by Jim Fall

- Written by: Jim Fall; Barbara Kymlicka; Charlotte Clark-Gamache
- Directed by: Jim Fall
- Starring: Bonnie Somerville; Shelley Long; Jordan Bridges; Haylie Duff; Sam McMurray; Jennifer Elise Cox
- Country of origin: United States
- Original language: English

Production
- Producer: Tosca Musk
- Cinematography: John Matysiak
- Editor: Margaret Goodspeed
- Running time: 97 minutes
- Production company: Johnson Production Group

Original release
- Network: Hallmark Channel
- Release: November 28, 2011

Holiday Engagement (originally titled A Thanksgiving Engagement) is a 2011 film starring Bonnie Somerville, Shelley Long and Jordan Bridges. It premiered on Hallmark Channel on November 28, 2011.

== Plot ==
Always struggling in life and love, Hillary Burns constantly feels the pressure to marry from her demanding mother, Meredith. Finally, this holiday season, she thinks she finally has it right. Hillary assures her meddling mother that her handsome new fiancé is coming to the Burns' family home for Thanksgiving weekend to finally meet her crazy clan. But when the workaholic lawyer suddenly breaks up with her, Hillary has to scramble to find a replacement or risk facing her mother's wrath. After posting an ad online, she hires David, an out-of-work actor, to pose as her fiancé in front of her mom, her dad and her snobbish sister Trish. Soon, her fake engagement starts to feel real when she begins falling for David.

== Cast ==
- Bonnie Somerville as Hillary Burns
- Shelley Long as Meredith Burns
- Jordan Bridges as David
- Haylie Duff as Trisha Burns
- Sam McMurray as Roy Burns
- Jennifer Elise Cox as Connie
- Susie Castillo as Lindsay
- Sam Pancake as Julian
- Chris McKenna as Jason King
- Carrie Wiita as Joy Burns
- Edi Patterson as Sophie
- Christopher Goodman as Peter
- Stewart Scott as Frank
- Tomas Kolehmainen as Gill (as Nick Angel)

== Reception ==
Pittsburgh City Paper said, "Holiday Engagement is a fun watch, with just enough laughs and romance to get you through its 97 minute run time."
