= Beau Bridges =

American actor (born 1941)

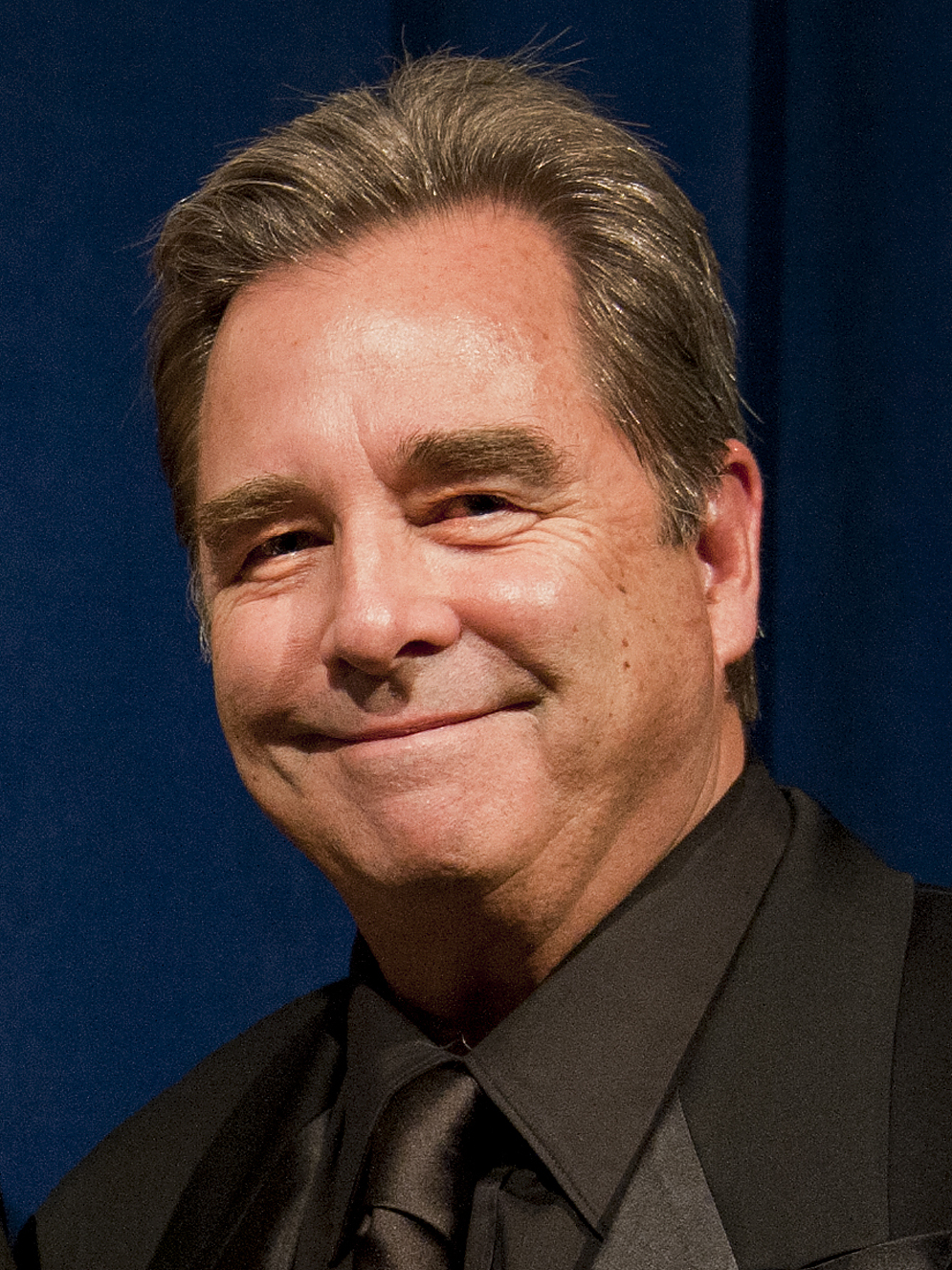
- Bridges in 2011
- Born: Lloyd Vernet Bridges III; December 9, 1941 (age 84); Los Angeles, California, U.S.
- Occupation: Actor
- Years active: 1948–present
- Spouses: Julie Landfield (m. 1964; div. 1974); Wendy Treece (m. 1984)
- Children: 5, including Jordan Bridges
- Parents: Lloyd Bridges (father); Dorothy Bridges (mother)
- Relatives: Jeff Bridges (brother)

Lloyd Vernet "Beau" Bridges III (born December 9, 1941) is an American actor. He is a three-time Emmy, two-time Golden Globe and one-time Grammy Award winner, as well as a two-time Screen Actors Guild Award nominee. Bridges also has a star on the Hollywood Walk of Fame for his contributions to television. He is the son of actor Lloyd Bridges and the elder brother of fellow actor Jeff Bridges.

== Early life ==
Bridges was born on December 9, 1941 in Los Angeles, California, the son of actors Lloyd Bridges (1913–1998) and Dorothy Bridges (née Simpson; 1915–2009). He was nicknamed Beau by his parents after Ashley Wilkes' son in Gone with the Wind. His younger brother is actor Jeff Bridges, and he has a younger sister, Lucinda. Another brother, Garrett, died in 1948 of sudden infant death syndrome. Beau has shared a close relationship with Jeff, for whom he acted as a surrogate father during childhood when their father was busy with work. He and his siblings were raised in the Holmby Hills section of Los Angeles.

Wanting to become a basketball star, he played in his freshman year at the University of California, Los Angeles (UCLA) under legendary coach John Wooden, where he joined Sigma Alpha Epsilon. He later transferred to the University of Houston, playing under Coach Guy V. Lewis. In 1959, he enlisted in the United States Coast Guard Reserve and served for eight years.

== Career ==
In 1948, Bridges had an uncredited juvenile role in Force of Evil, and a role as Bertram in No Minor Vices. In 1949, he played a third juvenile role in the film The Red Pony. In the 1962–1963 television season, Bridges, along with his younger brother, Jeff, appeared on their father's CBS anthology series, The Lloyd Bridges Show. He appeared in other television series too, including: National Velvet, The Fugitive, Combat, Gunsmoke, Bonanza, Mr. Novak and The Loner. In 1965, he guest-starred as Corporal Corbett in "Then Came the Mighty Hunter", Season 2, Episode 3 of the military series, Twelve O'Clock High. He found steady work in television and film throughout the 1970s and 1980s. He appeared in such feature films during that time as The Landlord (1970), The Other Side of the Mountain (1975), Greased Lightning (1977), Norma Rae (1979), The Fifth Musketeer (1979), Heart Like a Wheel (1983), and The Hotel New Hampshire (1984).

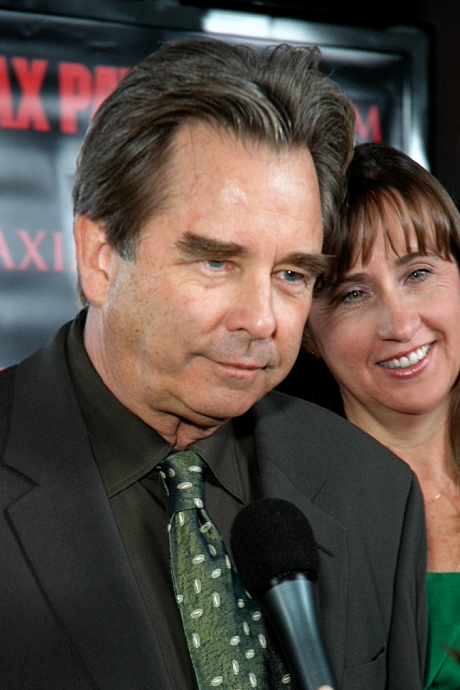
Bridges at the premiere of Max Payne, in 2008

In 1989, in perhaps his best-known role, he starred opposite his brother Jeff as one of The Fabulous Baker Boys. In the 1993–94 television season, Bridges appeared with his father in the 15-episode CBS comedy/western series, Harts of the West, set at a dude ranch in Nevada. In 1995, Bridges starred with his father and his son Dylan in "The Sandkings", the two-part pilot episode of the Showtime science fiction series The Outer Limits. In 1998, he starred as Judge Bob Gibbs in the one-season Maximum Bob on ABC. He had a recurring role in the Showtime series Beggars and Choosers (1999–2000).

In 2001, he guest-starred as Daniel McFarland, the stepfather of Jack McFarland, in two episodes of the NBC sitcom Will & Grace. He played a single father and college professor in the fantasy adventure film Voyage of the Unicorn, based on the novel by James C. Christensen.

From 2002 to 2003, he took on the role of Senator Tom Gage, newly appointed Director of the Central Intelligence Agency, in over 30 episodes of the drama series The Agency. In January 2005, he was cast as Major General Hank Landry, the new commander of Stargate Command in Stargate SG-1. He also played the character in five episodes of the spin-off series Stargate Atlantis as well as the two direct-to-DVD films Stargate: The Ark of Truth and Stargate: Continuum.

In November 2005, he guest-starred as Carl Hickey, the father of the title character in the hit NBC comedy My Name Is Earl. Bridges' character became recurring. Bridges received a 2007 Emmy Award nomination for his performance.

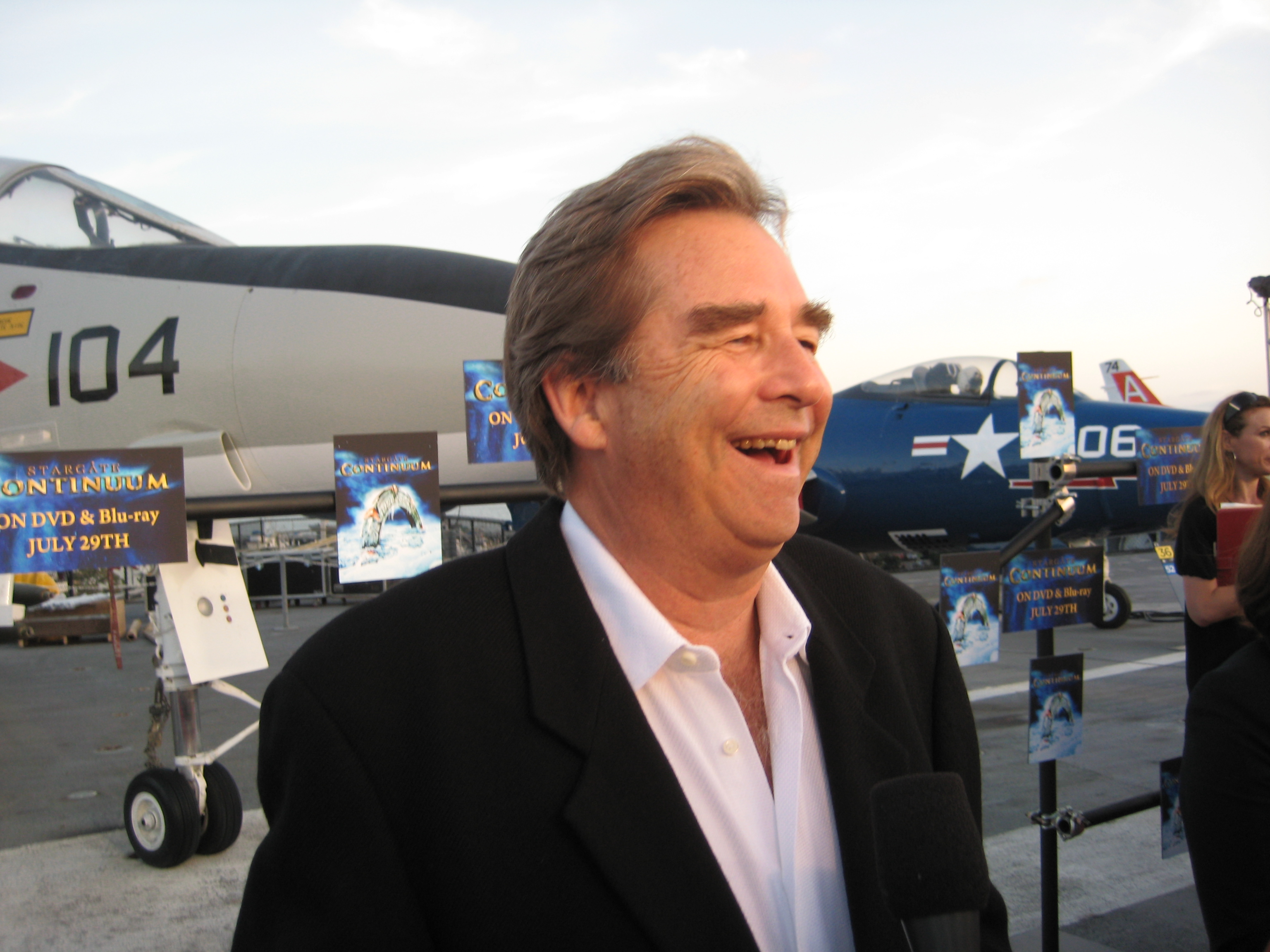
Bridges on USS Midway Museum flight deck to promote Stargate: Continuum, July 2008

In 2008, Bridges co-starred in the motion picture Max Payne, based on the video game character. The film also starred Mark Wahlberg and Mila Kunis. Bridges portrayed "BB" Hensley, an ex-cop who aids Wahlberg on his quest to bring down a serial killer. The film received mixed reviews, but Bridges' participation was noted for being a positive one. It was not the first motion picture with Bridges regarding the video game world; The Wizard had him in a role as a landscaping company owner who was later found, like his son Jimmy (played by actor Luke Edwards), to have a skill with NES games.

On February 8, 2009, Cynthia Nixon, Blair Underwood, and Bridges won a Grammy Award for Best Spoken Word Album for their recording of Al Gore's An Inconvenient Truth.

In 2009, Bridges guest-starred as Eli Scruggs on the 100th episode of Desperate Housewives and received an Emmy Award nomination for his performance.

In 2010, Bridges signed with Chris Mallick in the production of the film Columbus Circle. On March 19, 2010, it was announced that Bridges would play the role of Joseph 'Rocky' Rockford, the father of private eye Jim Rockford, on the pilot episode of a new version of The Rockford Files, scheduled for production for broadcast in fall 2010. In 2011, he guest-starred as an old boyfriend of matriarch Nora Walker in Brothers and Sisters and as an attorney, estranged from his son Jared Franklin in Franklin & Bash.

On January 3, 2012, Bridges took on the role of J.B. Biggley in the hit revival of the Broadway musical How to Succeed in Business Without Really Trying, taking over for John Larroquette. He was contracted to play the role until July 1, 2012; however, the revival closed on May 20, 2012.

On October 3, 2013, Bridges became a major character on the CBS television show The Millers. He plays Tom, the father of two children: son Nathan Miller (Will Arnett) and daughter Debbie (Jayma Mays). Tom, after forty-three years of marriage, has gotten divorced and has moved back in with his daughter, driving her crazy. Bridges joined the series in early March 2013.

Bridges has had several roles in films since then, including Underdog Kids and Lawless Range in 2016. He has also had guest roles on the shows Masters of Sex and Code Black.

In 2024, Bridges took the role of the managing partner (Howard 'Senior' Markeson) of the law firm (Jacobson Moore) where alias Maddy Matlock works in the new Matlock series.

== Awards ==
Bridges has 14 Emmy Award nominations with three wins. He is one of only two actors to win the Emmy for Outstanding Supporting Actor In A Miniseries Or Special more than once, with two wins, Michael Moriarty is the second.

- 1992 Outstanding Lead Actor In A Miniseries Or Special, for Without Warning: The James Brady Story
- 1993 Outstanding Supporting Actor In A Miniseries Or Special, for The Positively True Adventures of the Alleged Texas Cheerleader-Murdering Mom
- 1997 Outstanding Supporting Actor In A Miniseries Or Special, for The Second Civil War

== Personal life ==
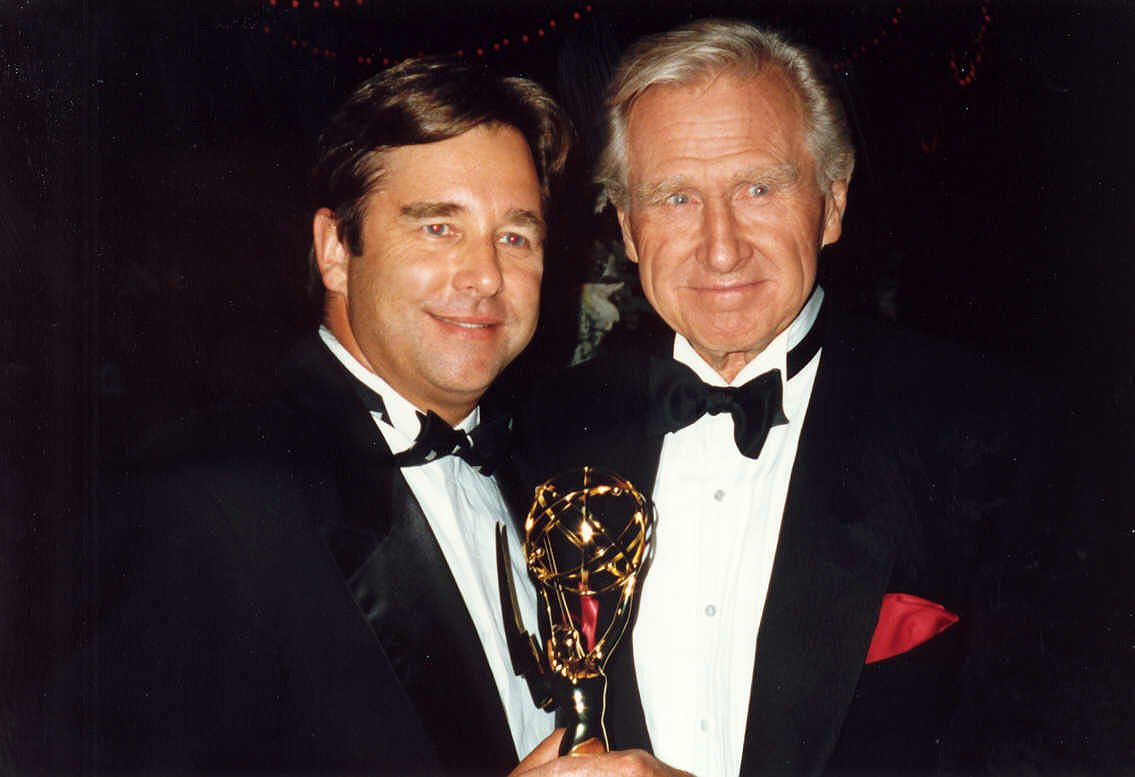
Bridges with his father, Lloyd, in 1992

Bridges married Julie Landfield in 1964; the two divorced in 1974. They have two sons, including Jordan Bridges (b. 1973). He married Wendy Treece on April 10, 1984. They have three children.

Bridges is a Christian. He has stated that if the script calls for his character to say God's name in vain, he will ask the director if he can change the line. Bridges has been a vegan since 2004.

Bridges, his brother Jeff Bridges and late father Lloyd Bridges were among six veterans – the others being Jerry Coleman, Bob Feller and Brian Lamb – honored with the Lone Sailor Award by the United States Navy Memorial in 2011. The award recognizes Navy, Marine and Coast Guard veterans who have distinguished themselves in their civilian careers.

== Filmography ==
=== Film ===
Year	Title	Role	Notes
1948	No Minor Vices	Bertram	
1948	Force of Evil	Frankie Tucker	Uncredited
1949	The Red Pony	Beau	
1949	Zamba	Tommy	
1951	The Company She Keeps	Obie	Uncredited
1961	The Explosive Generation	Mark	
1965	Village of the Giants	Fred	
1967	The Incident	Felix	
1968	For Love of Ivy	Tim Austin	
1969	Gaily, Gaily	Ben Harvey	
1970	Adam's Woman	Adam	
1970	The Landlord	Elgar	
1971	The Christian Licorice Store	Cane	
1972	Hammersmith Is Out	Billy Breedlove	
1972	Child's Play	Paul Reis	
1973	Your Three Minutes Are Up	Charlie	
1974	Lovin' Molly	Johnny	
1975	The Other Side of the Mountain	Dick Buek	
1976	One Summer Love	Jesse	
1976	Swashbuckler	Major Folly	
1976	Two-Minute Warning	Mike Ramsay	
1977	Greased Lightning	Hutch	
1978	The Four Feathers	Harry Faversham	
1979	Norma Rae	Sonny	
1979	The Fifth Musketeer	Louis XIV	
1979	The Runner Stumbles	Toby Felker	
1980	Silver Dream Racer	Bruce McBride	
1981	Honky Tonk Freeway	Duane Hansen	
1982	Night Crossing	Günter Wetzel	
1982	Witness for the Prosecution	Leonard Vole	
1982	Love Child	Jack Hansen	
1983	Heart Like a Wheel	Connie Kalitta	
1984	The Hotel New Hampshire	Mr. Win Berry	
1985	Alice in Wonderland	Unicorn	
1987	The Killing Time	Sam Wayburn	
1987	The Wild Pair	Joe Jennings	Also director
1988	Seven Hours to Judgment	John Eden	
1989	The Iron Triangle	Capt. Keene	
1989	Signs of Life	John Alder	
1989	The Fabulous Baker Boys	Frank Baker	co-starring Jeff Bridges
1989	The Wizard	Sam Woods	
1990	Daddy's Dyin': Who's Got the Will?	Orville Turnover	
1991	Married to It	John Morden	
1992	Sidekicks	Jerry	
1996	Jerry Maguire	Matt Cushman	Uncredited
1996	Hidden in America	Bill Januson	
1997	RocketMan	Bud Nesbitt	
1999	The White River Kid	Daddy Weed	
2000	Common Ground	Father Leon	
2000	Sordid Lives	G.W. Nethercoth	
2000	Meeting Daddy	Larry Branson	
2000	Songs in Ordinary Time	Omar Duvall	
2001	Voyage of the Unicorn	Alan Aisling	
2001	Boys Klub	Mario's Dad	
2003	Out of the Ashes	Herman Prentiss	
2004	10.5	President Paul Hollister	
2004	Debating Robert Lee	Mr. Lee	
2005	The Ballad of Jack and Rose	Marty Rance	
2005	Smile	Steven	
2006	I-See-You.Com	Harvey Bellinger	
2006	The Good German	Colonel Muller	
2006	Charlotte's Web	Dr. Dorian	
2007	Americanizing Shelley	Gary Gordon	
2007	Spinning Into Butter	Dean Burton Strauss	
2008	Stargate: The Ark of Truth	Major General Hank Landry	Video
2008	Stargate: Continuum	Major General Hank Landry	Video
2008	Max Payne	B.B. Hensley	
2010	Free Willy: Escape from Pirate's Cove	Gus Grisby	Video
2010	My Girlfriend's Boyfriend	Logan Young	
2011	Don't Fade Away	Chris White	
2011	The Descendants	Cousin Hugh	
2012	Columbus Circle	Dr. Ray Fontaine	
2012	Eden	Bob Gault	
2012	Hit & Run	Clint Perkins	
2012	From Up on Poppy Hill	Yoshio Onodera	Voice, English dub
2013	Rushlights	Sheriff Brogden	
2014	1000 to 1: The Cory Weissman Story	Coach	Video
2014	The Tale of the Princess Kaguya	Prince Kuramochi	Voice, English dub
2015	Underdog Kids	Ron	
2016	Lawless Range	Mr. Reed	
2017	The Mountain Between Us	Walter	
2018	Galveston	Stan	
2018	All About Nina	Larry Michaels	
2018	Dirty Politics	Hank	
2019	Supervized	Ted	
2019	Elsewhere	Dad	
2020	One Night in Miami...	Mr. Carlton	
2022	Dreamin' Wild	Don Sr.	
2022	End of the Road	Captain J.D. Hammers	
2024	The Neon Highway	Claude Allen	
2024	Camera	Eric Conway	
2025	Desert Road	Old Man	
2025	Blue Eyed Girl		Post-production
2026	Diary of a Wimpy Kid Christmas: The Getaway	Captain Stubbard	Voice

=== Television ===
Year	Title	Role	Notes
1960–1963	My Three Sons	Russ Burton	3 episodes
1960–1961	Sea Hunt	Warren Tucker	2 episodes
1961	The Real McCoys	Randy Cooperton	Episode: "The Rich Boy"
1962	National Velvet	Mercutio	Episode: "The Star"
1962	Wagon Train	Larry Gill	Episode: "The John Bernard Show"
1962–1963	Ensign O'Toole	Seaman Howard Spicer	32 episodes
1963	Rawhide	Billy Johanson	Episode: "Incident at Paradise"
1963	Ben Casey	Larry Masterson	2 episodes
1964	The Eleventh Hour	Leonard	Episode: "Cannibal Plants, They Eat You Alive"
1964	Combat!	Private Orville Putnam	Episode: "The Short Day of Private Putnam"
1964	My Three Sons	Howard Sears	2 episodes
1965	Twelve O'Clock High	Cpl. Steven Corbett	Episode: "Then Came the Mighty Hunter"
1965	The F.B.I.	Jerry Foley	Season 1, Episode 12: "An Elephant is Like a Rope"
1966	Gunsmoke	Jason	Episode: "My Father's Guitar"
1966	The Fugitive	Gary Keller	Episode:"Stroke of Genius"
1966	Branded	Lon Allison	Episode:"Nice Day for a Hanging"
1966	The Loner	Johnny Sharp	Episode:"The Mourners of Johnny Sharp"
1967	The Fugitive	Larry Corby	Episode: "The Other Side Of The Coin"
1967	Bonanza	Horace Perkins	Episode: "Justice"
1967	Cimarron Strip	Billie Joe Show	Episode: "Legend of Jud Starr"
1971	Robert Young and the Family	Sketch Actor	Television film
1973	The Man Without a Country	Frederick Ingham	Television film
1974	The Stranger Who Looks Like Me	Chris Schroeder	Television film
1978	The Four Feathers	Harry Faversham	Television film
1978	The President's Mistress	Ben Morton	Television film
1978	Mutual Respect	Kevin Pearse	Television film
1978	Hallmark Hall of Fame	Stubby Pringle	Episode: "Stubby Pringle's Christmas"
1979	The Child Stealer	David Rodman	Television film
1980	United States	Richard Chapin	13 episodes
1982	The Kid from Nowhere	Bud Herren	Television film
1982	Dangerous Company	Ray Johnson	Television film
1982	Witness for the Prosecution	Leonard Vole	Television film
1984	The Red-Light Sting	Frank Powell	Television film
1985	Space	Randy Claggett	Five-part miniseries
1986	Outrage!	Brad Gordon	Television film
1989	Everybody's Baby: The Rescue of Jessica McClure	Richard Czech	Television film
1989	Frederick Forsyth Presents: Just Another Secret	Grant	Television film
1991	Without Warning: The James Brady Story	James Brady	Television film
1990	Women & Men: Stories of Seduction	Gerry Green	Television film
1990	Guess Who's Coming for Christmas?	Arnold Zimmerman	Television film
1991	Wildflower	Jack Perkins	Television film
1991	Tales from the Crypt	Dr. Martin Fairbanks	Episode: "Abra Cadaver"
1993	Elvis and the Colonel: The Untold Story	Col. Tom Parker	Television film
1993	The Man with Three Wives	Norman Grayson	Television film
1993	The Positively True Adventures of the Alleged Texas Cheerleader-Murdering Mom	Terry Harper	Television film
1993–1994	Harts of the West	Dave Heart	15 episodes
1994	Secret Sins of the Father	Tom Thielman	Television film
1994	Million Dollar Babies	Dr. Allan Roy Dafoe	Television film
1995	Kissinger and Nixon	Richard Nixon	Television film
1995	The Outer Limits	Dr. Simon Kress	Episode: "The Sandkings"
1996	A Stranger to Love	Allan Grant	Television film
1996	Nightjohn	Clel Waller	Television film
1996	Losing Chase	Richard Phillips	Television film
1996	The Uninvited	Charles Johnson	Television film
1996	Hidden in America	Bill Januson	Television film
1997	The Second Civil War	Jim Farley	Television film
1998	Maximum Bob	Judge Bob Gibbs	7 episodes
1999	Inherit the Wind	E.K. Hornbeck	Television film
1999	P.T. Barnum	P.T. Barnum	Television film
2000	The Wild Thornberrys	Hayden Adam	Voice, episode: "Every Little Bit Alps"
2000	The Christmas Secret	Nick	Television film
2001–2003	The Agency	Tom Gage	32 episodes
2002	Will & Grace	Daniel McFarland	Episode: "Moveable Feast"
2002	We Were the Mulvaneys	Michael Mulvaney Sr.	Television film
2002	Sightings: Heartland Ghost	Derek	Television film
2004	Evel Knievel	John Bork	Television film
2005	Into the West	Stephen Hoxie	Episode: "Manifest Destiny"
2005–2007	Stargate SG-1	Major General Hank Landry	35 episodes
2005–2006	Stargate: Atlantis	Major General Hank Landry	5 episodes
2005–2006	American Dad!	Doctor / Lieutenant Eddie Thacker	Voice, 2 episodes
2005–2008	My Name Is Earl	Carl Hickey	7 episodes
2006	10.5: Apocalypse	President Paul Hollister	Television film
2007	Two Families		Television film
2009	Desperate Housewives	Eli Scruggs	Episode: "The Best Thing That Ever Could Have Happened"
2009	The Closer	Detective George Andrews	Episode: "Make Over"
2011	Brothers & Sisters	Nick Brody	5 episodes
2011	Game Time: Tackling the Past	Frank Walker	Television film
2011–2012	Franklin & Bash	Leonard Franklin	3 episodes
2011–2012	White Collar	Agent Kramer	3 episodes
2013	The Goodwin Games	Benjamin Goodwin	4 episodes
2013–2016	Masters of Sex	Barton Scully	21 episodes
2013–2015	The Millers	Tom Miller	34 episodes
2014	Bubble Guppies	Mr. Claws	Voice, episode: "A Very Guppy Christmas!"
2015–2017	Penn Zero: Part-Time Hero	Sheriff Scaley Briggs	Voice, 4 episodes
2015–2018	Black-ish	Paul Johnson	3 episodes
2016	Flower Shop Mysteries	Jeffrey Knight	3 episodes
2016	Code Black	Pete Delaney	Episode: "Hail Mary"
2016–2017	Bloodline	Roy Gilbert	12 episodes
2017	Christmas in Angel Falls	Michael	Television film
2017–2018	Mosaic	Alan Pape	8 episodes
2018–2020	Homeland	Vice President Ralph Warner	6 episodes
2018–2020	Greenleaf	Bob Whitmore	5 episodes
2019	Goliath	Roy Wheeler	5 episodes
2020	Messiah	Edmund DeGuilles	5 episodes
2020	Robbie	Robbie Walton Sr.	8 episodes
2021	Mr. Mayor	Adolphus Hass	Episode: "Avocado Crisis"
2021	The Premise	William	Episode: "Moment of Silence"
2022	Our Christmas Italian Memories	Vincent Colucci	Television film
2023	Lessons in Chemistry	Harry Wilson	3 episodes
2024–Present	Matlock	Senior	Recurring
2026	R. J. Decker	Reggie Decker	2 episodes

=== Video games ===
Year	Title	Role	Notes
2025	Goodnight Universe	Angus	

== Awards and nominations ==
Year	Association	Category	Nominated work	Result
1969	Golden Globe Awards	Best Supporting Actor – Motion Picture	For Love of Ivy	Nominated
1990	American Comedy Awards	Funniest Supporting Actor in a Motion Picture	The Fabulous Baker Boys	Nominated
1990	National Society of Film Critics Awards	Best Supporting Actor	The Fabulous Baker Boys	Won
1992	Golden Globe Awards	Best Actor – Miniseries or Television Film	Without Warning: The James Brady Story	Won
1992	Primetime Emmy Awards	Outstanding Lead Actor in a Miniseries or a Movie	Without Warning: The James Brady Story	Won
1993	Primetime Emmy Awards	Outstanding Supporting Actor in a Miniseries or a Movie	The Positively True Adventures of the Alleged; Texas Cheerleader-Murdering Mom	Won
1994	Golden Globe Awards	Best Supporting Actor – Series, Miniseries or Television Film	The Positively True Adventures of the Alleged; Texas Cheerleader-Murdering Mom	Won
1995	CableACE Awards	Actor in a Drama Series	The Outer Limits	Nominated
1995	Primetime Emmy Awards	Outstanding Guest Actor in a Drama Series	The Outer Limits	Nominated
1996	Primetime Emmy Awards	Outstanding Lead Actor in a Miniseries or a Movie	Kissinger & Nixon	Nominated
1997	Golden Globe Awards	Best Actor – Miniseries or Television Film	Losing Chase	Nominated
1997	Primetime Emmy Awards	Outstanding Lead Actor in a Miniseries or a Movie	Hidden in America	Nominated
1997	Primetime Emmy Awards	Outstanding Supporting Actor in a Miniseries or a Movie	The Second Civil War	Won
1997	Satellite Awards	Best Actor – Miniseries or Television Film	Hidden in America	Nominated
1997	Screen Actors Guild Awards	Outstanding Performance by a Male Actor in a Miniseries or Television Movie	Hidden in America	Nominated
1999	Primetime Emmy Awards	Outstanding Supporting Actor in a Miniseries or a Movie	Inherit the Wind	Nominated
2000	Primetime Emmy Awards	Outstanding Lead Actor in a Miniseries or a Movie	P.T. Barnum	Nominated
2000	Satellite Awards	Best Actor – Miniseries or Television Film	P.T. Barnum	Nominated
2002	Primetime Emmy Awards	Outstanding Lead Actor in a Miniseries or a Movie	We Were the Mulvaneys	Nominated
2007	Primetime Emmy Awards	Outstanding Guest Actor in a Comedy Series	My Name Is Earl	Nominated
2008	Grammy Award	Best Spoken Word Album	An Inconvenient Truth	Won
2009	Primetime Emmy Awards	Outstanding Guest Actor in a Comedy Series	Desperate Housewives	Nominated
2010	Primetime Emmy Awards	Outstanding Guest Actor in a Drama Series	The Closer	Nominated
2011	Gotham Awards	Best Ensemble Performance	The Descendants	Nominated
2011	Primetime Emmy Awards	Outstanding Guest Actor in a Drama Series	Brothers & Sisters	Nominated
2012	Broadcast Film Critics Association Awards	Best Cast	The Descendants	Nominated
2012	Screen Actors Guild Awards	Outstanding Performance by a Cast in a Motion Picture	The Descendants	Nominated
2014	Critics' Choice Television Awards	Best Guest Performer in a Drama Series	Masters of Sex	Nominated
2014	Primetime Emmy Awards	Outstanding Guest Actor in a Drama Series	Masters of Sex	Nominated
2015	Primetime Emmy Awards	Outstanding Guest Actor in a Drama Series	Masters of Sex	Nominated
