= The Deadly Dream =

1971 American made-for-television film

- Genre: Thriller; Drama
- Written by: Barry Oringer
- Directed by: Alf Kjellin
- Starring: Lloyd Bridges; Janet Leigh; Carl Betz; Leif Erickson
- Music by: Dave Grusin
- Country of origin: United States
- Original language: English

Production
- Producer: Stanley Shpetner
- Cinematography: Jack A. Marta
- Editor: Robert L. Kimble
- Running time: 73 minutes
- Production company: Universal Television

Original release
- Network: ABC
- Release: September 25, 1971

The Deadly Dream is an American made-for-television thriller-drama film starring Lloyd Bridges and Janet Leigh. It premiered as the ABC Movie of the Week on September 25, 1971.

== Plot ==
A scientist has reoccurring dreams in which he is pursued by a mysterious tribunal for something that he's not aware that he's done. He comes to realize that his dreams may have become his reality.

== Cast ==
- Lloyd Bridges as Dr. Jim Hanley
- Janet Leigh as Laurel Hanley
- Carl Betz as Dr. Howard Geary
- Leif Erickson as Dr. Harold Malcolm
- Don Stroud as Kagan
- Richard Jaeckel as Delgreve
- Phillip Pine as Dr. Farrow
- Herbert Nelson as Dr. Goodman
- Arlene Dahl as Connie
- Salome Jens as Mary

== Reception ==
The Los Angeles Times said the film "Leaves you guessing at the end as much as the beginning."
