= In the Nick of Time (1991 film) =

- Genre: Comedy; Family; Fantasy
- Written by: Jon S. Denny; Rick Podell; Michael Preminger; Maryedith Burrell
- Directed by: George T. Miller
- Starring: Lloyd Bridges; Michael Tucker; Cleavon Little
- Music by: Steve Dorff
- Country of origin: United States
- Original language: English

Production
- Executive producer: Janet Faust Krusi
- Producer: Michael Jaffe
- Production location: Toronto
- Cinematography: Brian R.R. Hebb
- Editor: Ron Wisman
- Running time: 89 minutes
- Production company: Walt Disney Television

Original release
- Network: NBC
- Release: December 16, 1991

In the Nick of Time is a 1991 American made-for-television Christmas fantasy-comedy film directed by George T. Miller. The film was first telecast December 16, 1991 on NBC.

== Plot ==
The old Santa Claus (Bridges) has seven days to find the new Santa Claus (Tucker) and pass the torch to him. The only problem is the new Santa Claus is a curmudgeon who lost his wife and his will to live. He works as a reporter for The Chicago Sun Times, which is a throwback to Yes, Virginia, there is a Santa Claus, and has to rediscover the joy of Christmas. At the last minute, he realizes what is important and becomes the new Santa Claus.

== Cast ==
- Lloyd Bridges as Santa Claus
- Michael Tucker as Ben Talbot
- Cleavon Little as Freddy
- Conrad Bergschneider as Louie
- Matt Birman as Window Dresser
- Richard Blackburn as William
- Steve Cliffe as Gang Member #1
- Jessica DiCicco - Aimee Misch
- Lucy Filippone as Sheila
- Elvira Graham as Tough Chick
- Ted Hanlan as Ward Santa
- Thomas Hauff as Figgus
- Ken James - Ridley
- Phillip Jarrett as Cop
- Jamie Jones as Nick
- Michael Lamport as Godfrey
- Alison La Placa - Susan Rosewell
- Corey Macri as Gang Member #2
- A Martinez as Charlie Misch
- Martin Martinuzzi as Bartender
- Jenny Parsons as Melina Liviakis
- Adrian Paul as Interviewer
- Bryan Renfro as Folksinger
- Jackie Richardson as Nurse
- Wayne Robson as Melvin
- Roland Smith - Messenger
- Audrey Webb as Sheila
- Thick Wilson as Street Santa

== See also ==
- List of Christmas films
- Santa Claus in film
