= List of television programs based on films =

This is a list of television series that have been adapted from theatrical films, either as a straight adaptation (i.e. a "remake"), or as a sequel or prequel.

== Follow-ups and prequels ==
These television series follow the events of the original theatrical film, so they can be considered sequels of it, or take place before the events of the original theatrical film and are set within the same universe.

Title	Precedes/Follows	Type	Notes
Ace Ventura: Pet Detective	Ace Ventura: Pet Detective	Animated	
The Adventures of Jimmy Neutron, Boy Genius	Jimmy Neutron: Boy Genius	CGI animated	
All Dogs Go to Heaven: The Series	All Dogs Go to Heaven	Animated	Takes place after the events of All Dogs Go to Heaven 2
Aladdin	Aladdin	Animated	Set between The Return of Jafar and Aladdin and the King of Thieves.
Alienators: Evolution Continues	Evolution	Animated	Takes place after the events of the movie
Alien: Earth	Alien	Live action	Set two years before Alien
Alien Nation	Alien Nation	Live-action	
American Gigolo	American Gigolo	Live-action	Set 15 years after the events of the film
Ash vs Evil Dead	The Evil Dead films	Live-action	Set 30 years after The Evil Dead trilogy
Baahubali: Before the Beginning	Baahubali: The Beginning and Baahubali 2: The Conclusion	Live-action	
Baahubali: The Lost Legends	Baahubali: The Beginning and Baahubali 2: The Conclusion	Animated	
Back at the Barnyard	Barnyard	CGI animated	
Bates Motel	Psycho	Live-action	Follows a young Norman Bates, but is set in the modern day.
Back to the Future: The Animated Series	Back to the Future	Animated	Takes place after Back to the Future Part III, Christopher Lloyd reprises his role of Doc Brown in live-action wraparounds; while Tom Wilson and Mary Steenburgen reprise their characters in animated form.
Benji, Zax & the Alien Prince	Benji	Live-action	
Beetlejuice	Beetlejuice	Animated	
Beyond Westworld	Westworld	Live-action	
Big Hero 6: The Series; Baymax!	Big Hero 6	Animated	Take place after the events of the film.
Black Dynamite	Black Dynamite	Animated	
Blade: The Series	Blade	Live-action	Takes place after Blade: Trinity
Blade Runner: Black Lotus	Blade Runner	CGI animated	Set between Blade Runner and Blade Runner 2049
Blue Thunder	Blue Thunder	Live-action	Series used footage from the film to cut costs.
The Boss Baby: Back in the Crib	Boss Baby	Animated	Continuation of the film.
Buffy the Vampire Slayer; Angel	Buffy the Vampire Slayer	Live-action	Set one year after the film, though the film is not considered canon.
Buzz Lightyear of Star Command	Toy Story	Animated	A kind of prequel to the CG movies as it is the series on which the Buzz Lightyear toy that features in Toy Story is based. Andy Davis is seen watching an episode of this in the first film.
Casablanca; Casablanca	Casablanca	Live-action	There were two separate series in 1955 and 1983; both taking place before the film.
Clerks: The Animated Series	Clerks	Animated	A live-action series pilot was also made, without any of the cast or crew involved.
Chucky	Child’s Play films	Live-action	Serves as a sequel to Cult of Chucky
Cloudy with a Chance of Meatballs	Cloudy with a Chance of Meatballs	Animated	Takes place before the events of the film.
Cobra Kai	The Karate Kid	Live-action	Continuation of the film series.
The Continental: From the World of John Wick	John Wick films	Live-action	
Code Black	Code Black	Live-action	
The Creep Tapes	Creep films	Live-action	
The Crow: Stairway to Heaven	The Crow	Live-action	
Crystal Lake	Friday the 13th	Live-action	Prequel to the Friday the 13th film series.
Damien	The Omen	Live-action	Set years after The Omen.
The Dark Crystal: Age of Resistance	The Dark Crystal	Live-action/ puppetry	Set years before The Dark Crystal
Dawn of the Croods; The Croods: Family Tree	The Croods films	Flash animated CGI animated	Dawn of the Croods is set before the events of The Croods. Family Tree takes place following the events of A New Age
Delta House	Animal House	Live-action	Two other sit-coms were also based loosely on Animal House, one called Brothers and Sisters in 1979 and another called Co-Ed Fever, also 1979.
Dominion	Legion	Live-action	Set 25 years after the film
DreamWorks Dragons	How to Train Your Dragon	CGI animated	Set between the first film and the sequels.
Dumb & Dumber: Animated	Dumb and Dumber	Animated	
Dumbo's Circus	Dumbo	Live-Action	
Dune: Prophecy	Dune	Live-Action	Set 10,000 years before the events of Dune.
The Emperor's New School	The Emperor's New Groove and Kronk's New Groove	Animated	Set possibly after of The Emperor's New Groove and before Kronk's New Groove.
The Exorcist	The Exorcist	Live-action	Set 40 years after The Exorcist – events in the film are referenced in the television series.
Fargo	Fargo	Live-action	The 10-episode first season was set in the same universe as the feature film, though took place years later. Future seasons have followed an anthology format with each season being set in a different era along with a different story, cast and set of characters, in the same universe as the movie. Bruce Campbell reprises his role as Ronald Reagan in the second season.
Fast & Furious: Spy Racers	Fast & Furious films	CGI animated	
Fievel's American Tails	An American Tail: Fievel Goes West	Animated	
Friday: The Animated Series	Friday, Next Friday and Friday After Next	Animated	
From Dusk till Dawn: The Series	From Dusk till Dawn	Live-action	Takes place in the same world as the film.
Gremlins: Secrets of the Mogwai	Gremlins	Animated	Prequel to the first film.
Godzilla: The Series	Godzilla (1998 film)	Animated	Takes place after the film.
Heartbreak High	The Heartbreak Kid	Live-action	
Herbie, the Love Bug	Herbie Goes Bananas	Live-action	Takes place a few years after Herbie Goes to Monte Carlo, but does not directly reference the events of Herbie Goes Bananas
Hercules: The Animated Series	Hercules	Animated	Series is a prequel to the 1997 movie.
Highlander: The Series; Highlander: The Raven; Highlander: The Animated Series	Highlander	Live-action/animated	The series set few years after the first film.
History of the World, Part II	History of the World, Part I	Live-action	
Honey, I Shrunk the Kids	Honey, I Shrunk the Kids	Live-action	Takes place before Honey, I Blew Up the Kid.
Hotel Transylvania: The Series	Hotel Transylvania	Animated	Prequel to the movie.
It: Welcome to Derry	It	Live-action	Prequel to It and It Chapter Two
J Bole Toh Jadoo	Koi... Mil Gaya	Live-action/animated	
Jurassic World Camp Cretaceous; Jurassic World: Chaos Theory	Jurassic World	CGI animated	Camp Cretaceous takes place before, during and after the events of Jurassic World and after the opening of Fallen Kingdom. Chaos Theory takes place between Fallen Kingdom and Dominion
The Karate Kid	The Karate Kid	Animated	
Kirikou découvre les animaux d'Afrique	Kirikou and the Sorceress and Kirikou et les bêtes sauvages	Live-action/animated	Educational series using footage from both films along with original animated and live-action documentary footage.
Kong: The Animated Series	King Kong	Animated	Set after the events from the 1933 film.
Kung Fu Panda: Legends of Awesomeness; Kung Fu Panda: The Paws of Destiny; Kung Fu Panda: The Dragon Knight	Kung Fu Panda	CGI animated	Legends of Awesomeness takes place between the first two films. The Paws of Destiny and The Dragon Knight take place after the third film.
The Land Before Time	The Land Before Time	Animated	Takes place after The Land Before Time XIII: The Wisdom of Friends
A League of Their Own	A League of Their Own	Live action	Takes place after the events of the movie
The Legend of Tarzan	Tarzan	Animated	Set one year after the events of the film.
The Librarians	The Librarian	Live-action	Spin-off of the film series.
Lilo & Stitch: The Series	Lilo & Stitch and Stitch! The Movie	Animated	Begins about one year after the events of the original film (and a few months after the separately-produced Lilo & Stitch 2: Stitch Has a Glitch); Stitch! The Movie is the pilot to Lilo & Stitch: The Series.
Limitless	Limitless	Live-action	Set four years after the events the film.
The Lion Guard	The Lion King II: Simba's Pride	Animated	Takes place during the time-gap between the films.
The Little Mermaid	The Little Mermaid	Animated	Takes place one year before the movie.
The Little Rascals	Our Gang/The Little Rascals	Animated	
Lock, Stock...The Series	Lock, Stock and Two Smoking Barrels	Live-action	
The Lord of the Rings: The Rings of Power	The Hobbit / The Lord of the Rings	Live-action	Set thousands of years before The Hobbit and Lord of the Rings series during the Second Age of Middle Earth.
The Mask: Animated Series	The Mask	Animated	
Men in Black: The Series	Men in Black	Animated	Takes place after the original film but contains conflicts with the continuity (one notable one is the main character Agent K defected in the film but still works for MIB in the animated series).
The Mighty Ducks: Game Changers	The Mighty Ducks film series.	Live-action	Continuation of the film series.
Mike Bassett: Manager	Mike Bassett: England Manager	Live-action	Set several years after the film
Monarch: Legacy of Monsters	Godzilla (2014 film)	Live-action	Takes place after the film.
Minority Report	Minority Report	Live-action	Set eleven years after the events from the film.
Monsters at Work	Monsters, Inc.	CGI animated	Set following the events of Monsters, Inc.
Monsters vs. Aliens	Monsters vs. Aliens	CGI animated	
Mortal Kombat: Konquest; Mortal Kombat: Defenders of the Realm	Mortal Kombat	Live-action/animated	Konquest series is a prequel to the film. Defenders of the Realm is alternative sequel to the film.
Mr. Belvedere	Sitting Pretty	Live-action	
The Mummy: The Animated Series	The Mummy series	Animated	The Mummy series is alternative sequel to the films The Mummy (1999) and The Mummy Returns (2001).
My Big Fat Greek Life	My Big Fat Greek Wedding	Live-action	
Napoleon Dynamite	Napoleon Dynamite	Animated	
National Treasure: Edge of History	National Treasure films	Live-action	
Ninja Turtles: The Next Mutation	Teenage Mutant Ninja Turtles live-action film and its two sequels	Live-action	Set some time after Teenage Mutant Ninja Turtles III and introduces a female turtle.
One Day (2011 film)	One Day (TV series)	Live-action	Remake
Open Season: Call of Nature	Open Season films	Animated	
Ozzy & Drix	Osmosis Jones	Animated	Set a year after the events in the movie.
The Penguin	The Batman	Live-action	Spinoff
Patlabor: The TV Series	Patlabor: The Movie	Animated	Alternative canon
The Pink Panther	The Pink Panther	Animated	The 1963 film featured an animated opening sequence. The star of the sequence, the eponymous Pink Panther, was so popular that it was awarded its own animated series. The series also featured an animated version of the films' main character, Inspector Clouseau.
Planet of the Apes; Return to the Planet of the Apes	Planet of the Apes	Live-action/animated	Set in the same universe but before the film.
Police Academy: Animated; Police Academy: The Series	Police Academy	Live-action/animated	There were two separate series: the animated one in 1988 and a live-action one in 1997.
Power Rangers Turbo	Turbo: A Power Rangers Movie	Live-action	A bridge between the shows Power Rangers Zeo and Power Rangers Turbo
Problem Child	Problem Child	Animated	
The Purge	The Purge films	Live-action	Set between The Purge: Anarchy and The Purge: Election Year
Rambo and the Forces of Freedom	Rambo	Animated	Set some time after Rambo: First Blood Part II.
Rapunzel's Tangled Adventure	Tangled	Animated	Set between the end of Tangled and the events of its short film, Tangled Ever After.
Ratu Ratu Queens: The Series	Ali & Ratu Ratu Queens	Live-action	Serves as the prequel of the film.
The Real Ghostbusters; Extreme Ghostbusters	Ghostbusters	Animated	Both series are non-canon, although it did mention some events from the films.
RoboCop: The Animated Series; RoboCop: The Series; RoboCop: Alpha Commando; RoboCop: Prime Directives	RoboCop	Animated/live-action	
Roughnecks: The Starship Troopers Chronicles	Starship Troopers	CGI animated	
The Santa Clauses	The Santa Clause 3: The Escape Clause	Live-action	
Sausage Party: Foodtopia	Sausage Party	CGI animated	Set a month after the events of the film.
Scott Pilgrim Takes Off	Scott Pilgrim vs. the World	Animated	
Serpico	Serpico	Live-action	
Shaft	Shaft	Live-action	
Bandit Goes Country; Bandit Bandit; Beauty and the Bandit; Bandit's Silver Angel	Smokey and the Bandit films	Live-action	Takes place before the events of the movies, and is thus a prequel.
Spaceballs: The Animated Series	Spaceballs	Animated	
The Spooktacular New Adventures of Casper	Casper	Animated	Takes place after the events of the film.
Starman	Starman	Live-action	Takes place fifteen years after the film.
Stargate SG-1; Stargate Atlantis; Stargate Universe; Stargate Infinity	Stargate	Live-action	Set one year after the film (SG-1). Infinity is non-canon and wasn't worked on by the writers of other Stargate series
Star Wars: Droids; Ewoks; Star Wars: Clone Wars; Star Wars: The Clone Wars; Star Wars Rebels; Star Wars Resistance; Star Wars: The Bad Batch; The Mandalorian; The Book of Boba Fett; Star Wars: Visions; Obi-Wan Kenobi; Andor; Star Wars: Tales; Ahsoka; The Acolyte; Star Wars: Skeleton Crew	The Star Wars films	Animated/CGI/live-action	The Clone Wars, Rebels, Resistance, The Bad Batch, The Mandalorian, The Book of Boba Fett, Obi-Wan Kenobi, Andor, Tales, Ahsoka, The Acolyte and Skeleton Crew are considered to be canon.
Street Fighter	Street Fighter	Animated	
Stitch! Stitch & Ai	Lilo & Stitch films	Animated	Both series take place after the events of Leroy & Stitch (the finale to Lilo & Stitch: The Series), with both series featuring recreated flashbacks of Lilo & Stitch, Lilo & Stitch 2: Stitch Has a Glitch, and The Origin of Stitch short film. However, both series are on separate timelines, as the Chinese series Stitch & Ai was produced without consideration towards the Stitch! anime. The canonicity of either series have not been established by Disney. Stitch! takes place approximately two decades after the events of Leroy & Stitch per Lilo's appearance as an adult with a daughter who looks identical to her as a child in a third-season episode. Stitch & Ai takes place in 2016 at the latest per a calendar appearing in the episode "Dragon Parade". How many years have passed since Leroy & Stitch is not specified, however, although Captain Gantu appears as part of the Galactic Council again after being reinstated to his post in Leroy & Stitch (he was forcibly retired from his post in Lilo & Stitch), and Cobra Bubbles appears without looking any different from his previous appearance in the Lilo & Stitch: The Series episode "Shush".
Stuart Little: The Animated Series	Stuart Little	Animated	Takes place after the events of Stuart Little 2
Taken	Taken films	Live-action	Effectively a prequel to the Taken film series, though set in the present day.
Ted	Ted films	Live-action	Set in between the opening and main plot of the first film
Terminator: The Sarah Connor Chronicles Terminator Zero	Terminator films	Live-action Animated	
Timon & Pumbaa; The Lion Guard	The Lion King	Animated	This series features supporting characters. The Lion Guard is set in between The Lion King and The Lion King II: Simba's Pride.
Training Day	Training Day	Live-action	Set 15 years after the events of the film.
Tremors	Tremors films	Live-action	Takes place right after Tremors 3: Back to Perfection.
Tron: Uprising	Tron: Legacy	Live-action/animated	Set between Tron and Tron: Legacy
Uncle Buck (1990); Uncle Buck (2016)	Uncle Buck	Live-action	Set sometime after the film; when his brother and sister-in-law die in a car accident, Buck is named as the guardian of Tia, Miles, and Maizy.
Venus et Apollon	Venus Beauté		French
War of the Worlds	The War of the Worlds	Live-action	Set 35 years later.
Wednesday	The Addams Family films	Live-action	
Wet Hot American Summer: First Day of Camp; Wet Hot American Summer: Ten Years Later	Wet Hot American Summer	Live-action	The first miniseries is a prequel to the 2001 film with the second being set ten years after.
Will the Real Jerry Lewis Please Sit Down	films of Jerry Lewis	Animated	
Willow	Willow	Live-action	Set over twenty years after the events of the film.
Wolf Creek	Wolf Creek film and its sequel	Live-action	A continuation of the Wolf Creek film and its sequel, Wolf Creek 2 – events in the first film are referenced in the television series.
Yamaleela.. Aa Tarvata	Yamaleela	Live-action	Based on the characters of the film.
The Young Indiana Jones Chronicles	The Indiana Jones films	Live-action	Series is a prequel to the films, depicting the life of the young Indiana Jones.

== Adaptations ==
These television series are adaptations of the original theatrical film, but are neither prequels nor sequels:

- 10 Things I Hate About You (based on the film of the same title)
- 101 Dalmatian Street (reboot series based on the 1961 film One Hundred and One Dalmatians)
- 101 Dalmatians: The Series (based on both the 1961 animated film and the 1996 live-action adaptation)
- 12 Monkeys (based on the film of the same title)
- 12 O'Clock High (from the 1949 film of the same title)
- 9 to 5 (from the film of the same title)
- 18 Again (based on 17 Again)
- The 7D (based on the characters from the 1937 Disney film Snow White and the Seven Dwarfs)
- Adam's Rib (from the film of the same title)
- The Adventures of Rin Tin Tin (based on the silent film franchise starring the dog of the same name)
- Alice (from Alice Doesn't Live Here Anymore)
- Alice's Wonderland Bakery (based on the world from the 1951 Disney film Alice in Wonderland)
- All Hail King Julien (from Madagascar)
- Animal Kingdom (from Animal Kingdom)
- Anna and the King (from The King and I)
- Ariel (based on the 1989 Disney film The Little Mermaid and the 2023 Live-action remake)
- The Asphalt Jungle (inspired by the 1950 film of the same title)
- Attack of the Killer Tomatoes: The Animated Series (animated; actually based on Return of the Killer Tomatoes, the sequel to Attack of the Killer Tomatoes)
- Baby Boom (based on the film of the same title)
- Baby Talk (loosely based on the film Look Who's Talking)
- The Bad News Bears (based on the 1976 film of the same title)
- Bajo el mismo cielo (based on the film of the same title)
- Bad Teacher (based on the film of the same title)
- Bagdad Cafe (based on the 1987 film of the same title)
- BeastMaster (syndicated television series loosely based on the film The Beastmaster)
- Beethoven (animated; from the film of the same title)
- Beetlejuice (animated; from the film of the same title)
- The Big Easy (based on the 1987 film of the same title)
- Bill & Ted's Excellent Adventures (1990) (animated; based on the 1989 film of the same title)
- Bill & Ted's Excellent Adventures (1992) (live-action; based on the 1989 film of the same title)
- Blood+ (animated; loosely based upon the anime film Blood: The Last Vampire)
- Bob & Carol & Ted & Alice (based on the film of the same title)
- Born Free (from the 1966 film of the same title)
- The Boss Baby: Back in Business (series based on the film The Boss Baby)
- Broken Arrow (based on the 1947 novel Blood Brother by Elliott Arnold and the film of the same title)
- The 'Burbs (adaptation of the 1989 film The 'Burbs.
- Bus Stop (based upon the 1955 William Inge play of the same title and the 1956 film version of the play)
- Bustin' Loose (based on the film of the same title)
- Cape Fear (based on the 1962 film of the same title and 1991 film of the same title)
- The Client (based on the film of the same title)
- The Client List (based on the film of the same title)
- Clueless (loose remake of the film of the same title, especially the series' first season)
- Conan the Adventurer (syndicated television series that is a loose adaptation of the 1982 film Conan the Barbarian)
- The Cowboys (based on the 1972 film of the same title)
- Crash (based on the film of the same title)
- The Crow: Stairway to Heaven (from The Crow)
- Curious George (adaptation of the 1941 book and the 2006 film of the same title)
- Daktari (based on the 1965 film Clarence, the Cross-Eyed Lion)
- Damien (based on The Omen film series)
- Dangerous Minds (based on the film of the same title)
- Day of the Dead (based on the film of the same title)
- The Dead Zone (adaptation of the 1983 film of the same title)
- Dirty Dancing (based on the film of the same title)
- Dixon of Dock Green (from The Blue Lamp)
- Doctor Dolittle (based upon the book series by Hugh Lofting and the 1967 film of the same title)
- Doctor in the House (from the film series of the same title)
- Dr. Kildare (from the film series of the same title)
- Dorothy and the Wizard of Oz (based on the 1939 film The Wizard of Oz and the 1900 novel The Wonderful Wizard of Oz by L. Frank Baum)
- Dominion (loose adaptation of the 2010 film Legion)
- Down and Out in Beverly Hills (based on the film of the same name)
- The Dukes of Hazzard (based on the 1975 film Moonrunners)
- Executive Suite (from the film of the same title)
- F/X: The Series (from F/X)
- Fame (from the film of the same title)
- Fantastic Voyage (from the film of the same title)
- The Farmer's Daughter (based on the film of the same title)
- Fast Times (from Fast Times at Ridgemont High)
- Father of the Bride (1961–1962 TV series based on the films Father of the Bride (1950) and Father's Little Dividend (1951))
- La Femme Nikita (1997; from the film La Femme Nikita, also called Nikita; see also Nikita TV series)
- Ferris Bueller (loose adaptation of the 1986 film Ferris Bueller's Day Off)
- Five Fingers (loose adaptation of the 1952 film 5 Fingers)
- Flipper (from the 1963 film of the same title); see also the 1995 series
- Foul Play (from the film of the same title)
- The Four Seasons (1984 TV series based on the 1981 film of the same title)
- Freddy's Nightmares (based on the character from the A Nightmare on Elm Street movie series, this was anthology series in the style of Tales from the Crypt – Freddy's involvement was often limited to introducing the story)
- Free Willy (animated; from the film of the same title)
- Freebie and the Bean (from the film of the same title)
- Friday the 13th: The Series (series with the Friday the 13th name but is not connected to the film series)
- Friday Night Lights (loose adaptation of the film of the same name)
- The Front Page (based upon the 1928 play and 1931 film version of the same title)
- The Gene Autry Show (from the Gene Autry film series and the earlier radio series Gene Autry's Melody Ranch)
- Get Shorty (from the film Get Shorty with a similar plot but different characters)
- The Ghost & Mrs. Muir (from the film of the same title)
- Gidget (sometimes seen as a sequel to the 1959 film of the same name, despite numerous discontinuities in plot, time frame, and other details – so perhaps best viewed as an adaptation of the film and its source novel, Gidget, the Little Girl with Big Ideas)
- The Girlfriend Experience (loose adaptation of the film of the same title)
- Godzilla (animated, from the Godzilla film series)
- Godzilla Island (from the Godzilla film series)
- Going My Way (from the film of the same title)
- The Greatest Show on Earth (from the film of the same title)
- Gun Shy (based on the 1975 film The Apple Dumpling Gang)
- Gung Ho (from the film of the same title)
- Hannibal (based on the Thomas Harris novels and film adaptations)
- Harry and the Hendersons (from the film of the same title)
- Heathers (based on the film of the same title)
- Herbie, the Love Bug (from the Herbie film series)
- High Fidelity (based on the film and novel of the same title)
- Hondo (based on the 1953 film of the same title)
- House Calls (from the film of the same title)
- Hotel (from the 1967 film of the same title)
- How the West Was Won (from the 1962 film of the same title)
- How to Marry a Millionaire (from the film of the same title)
- In the Heat of the Night (very loose adaptation of the film of the same title – the setting was changed from the 1960s to the 1980s)
- Jack Ryan (based on the Jack Ryan films)
- Irma Vep (based on the film of the same title)
- Jake and the Never Land Pirates (set in the world of the 1953 Disney film Peter Pan)
- James Bond Jr. (based on the James Bond film series and the 1967 novel The Adventures of James Bond Junior 003½ by R. D. Mascott)
- Journey to the Center of the Earth (based upon the original 1864 novel by Jules Verne and the 1959 film of the same title)
- Jumanji (from the film of the same title)
- The King Kong Show (based on the 1933 film King Kong)
- Kings Row (based upon the 1942 film of the same title and the Henry Bellamann novel)
- Kong: King of the Apes (based on the 1933 film King Kong)
- Lassie (1954) (based on the character from the 1940 novel Lassie Come-Home by Eric Knight and the renowned film franchise about the eponymous dog)
- Lassie (1997) (based on the Lassie film franchise)
- Lassie (2014) (animated series based on the Lassie film franchise)
- Lassie's Rescue Rangers (animated series based on the Lassie film franchise)
- Legend of the Three Caballeros (based on the 1944 film The Three Caballeros)
- Lethal Weapon (from the film franchise of the same title)
- The Life and Times of Grizzly Adams (from the 1974 film of the same title)
- The Life of Riley (based upon the 1940s radio show, The Life of Riley, and the 1949 film of the same name)
- Little Shop (animated; from the 1960 film The Little Shop of Horrors)
- Logan's Run (from the film of the same title)
- The Long, Hot Summer (from the 1958 film The Long, Hot Summer)
- Madagascar: A Little Wild (from Madagascar)
- Madigan (loosely based on the film of the same title – aired as part of The NBC Wednesday Mystery Movie programs)
- Mama (from the 1948 film I Remember Mama)
- The Magnificent Seven (from the film of the same title)
- Manchester Prep (loose adaptation of the movie Cruel Intentions – three episodes were produced for the planned TV series Manchester Prep, but the series was cancelled and the episodes never aired on TV; instead the episodes were edited together and released as the movie Cruel Intentions 2, though it was not a sequel to the original movie)
- M*A*S*H (from the film of the same title)
- Margie (from the film of the same title)
- McCloud (based upon the film Coogan's Bluff)
- Michael Shayne (based upon the 1940 film Michael Shayne: Private Detective and the 1940 novel The Private Practice of Michael Shayne by Brett Halliday)
- Mighty Ducks: The Animated Series (animated series loosely inspired by The Mighty Ducks film series)
- Mister Roberts (based upon the best selling novel, 1948 play, and the 1955 film of the same name)
- Mr. Lucky (from the 1943 film of the same title)
- Mr. Smith Goes to Washington (based upon the 1939 film of the same name)
- My Friend Flicka (based upon the 1944 film and Mary O'Hara's novel of the same name)
- My Friends Tigger & Pooh (from The Many Adventures of Winnie the Pooh)
- My Sister Eileen (based upon the 1942 and 1955 films of the same title)
- Naked City (from the 1948 film The Naked City)
- National Velvet (from the 1944 film and Enid Bagnold's novel of the same name)
- The Net (from the film of the same title)
- The Neverending Story (animated series based on the film of the same title)
- The New Adventures of Winnie the Pooh (from The Many Adventures of Winnie the Pooh)
- The New Lassie (based on the Lassie film franchise)
- Nikita (2010; from the film Nikita, also called La Femme Nikita; see also La Femme Nikita TV series)
- No Time for Sergeants (based upon the 1954 novel by Mac Hyman and the 1958 film of the same title)
- Operation Petticoat (from the film of the same title)
- The Outsiders (based upon the 1967 novel by S. E. Hinton and the 1983 film version of the same title)
- The Paper Chase (from the film of the same title)
- Paper Moon (from the film of the same title)
- Parenthood (1990) (based on the 1989 film of the same title)
- Parenthood (2010) (based on the 1989 film of the same title)
- Party Girl (from the film of the same title)
- The Penguins of Madagascar (from Madagascar)
- The Pink Panther (1993) (animated; based on The Pink Panther film series)
- Pink Panther and Sons (animated; based on The Pink Panther film series)
- Playdate with Winnie the Pooh (from The Many Adventures of Winnie the Pooh)
- Please Don't Eat the Daisies (from the film of the same title)
- Poltergeist: The Legacy (loosely based on the film franchise of the same title)
- Private Benjamin (from the film of the same title)
- Room for One More (based upon the 1952 film of the same name)
- The Roy Rogers Show (from the Roy Rogers film series)
- Rush Hour (from film franchise of the same title)
- School of Rock (from the film of the same title)
- Scream (from the film of the same title)
- Serpico (based on the film of the same title)
- Seven Brides for Seven Brothers (based on the film of the same title)
- Shaft (based upon the 1971 film of the same title)
- Shane (based upon the 1953 film of the same title)
- Sing Me a Story with Belle (based on the 1991 film Beauty and the Beast)
- Spider-Man: The New Animated Series (alternate continuation based on the 2002 film series)
- Spirit Riding Free (based on the film Spirit: Stallion of the Cimarron)
- Spy Kids: Mission Critical (animated; based on the Spy Kids film series)
- Stir Crazy (based on the film of the same title)
- Sugarfoot (faithfully based on The Boy from Oklahoma)
- Tales from the Neverending Story (based on the film of the same title)
- Tammy (based upon the Tammy film series)
- Teen Wolf (1986) (animated series based on the film of the same title)
- Teen Wolf (2011) (live-action series minimally based on the film of the same title)
- The Thin Man (from the film of the same title)
- The Third Man (from the film of the same title)
- Time After Time (loosely based on the film and novel of the same title)
- Timecop (from the film of the same title)
- Timon & Pumbaa (based on the eponymous characters from the Disney film The Lion King)
- Topper (from the film of the same title)
- Total Recall 2070 (from the 1990 film Total Recall)
- Toxic Crusaders (based on The Toxic Avenger film franchise)
- Transporter: The Series (based on the Transporter film series)
- Trapper John, M.D. (featuring the character from the 1970 film M*A*S*H)
- True Lies (adaptation of the 1994 film True Lies
- Voyage to the Bottom of the Sea (based on the film of the same title – the plot of the film was used as the basis of an episode of the series called "The Sky's on Fire")
- Wangan Midnight (anime adapted from the live-action series of the same name, in turn adapted from the manga)
- What We Do in the Shadows (based on the New Zealand film of the same title)
- Weird Science (from the film of the same title)
- Welcome to Pooh Corner (from The Many Adventures of Winnie the Pooh)
- Westworld (based the film of the same title)
- What's Happening!! (from Cooley High; the setting was moved from 1960s Chicago to 1970s Los Angeles)
- Working Girl (from the film of the same title)

== See also ==
- List of films based on television programs
- Lists of television programs

== Other sources ==
- 'Parenthood' And 23 More TV Shows Based On Movies
- THE 10 WORST TV SHOWS BASED ON MOVIES
- 12 Of The Worst TV Shows Based On Movies
- The 10 Worst TV Shows Inspired By Movies
- Worst of the Worst: TV Shows Based On Movies
- Best and Worst TV Shows Based on Movies
- Five Best TV Series Based on Movies
- 10 Movies You Had No Idea Were Turned Into TV Shows (VIDEO)
- 9 Stinkers That Prove ‘Romancing The Stone: The Series’ Is A Bad Idea
- 10 worst TV shows based on movies
- Can TV Shows Based on Movies Actually Be Good?
- Is it better to be a TV series based on a movie or vice versa?
- The Daily Beast: Bad TV Shows Adapted From Movies
- Big Picture, Small Screen: 20 Movie-Based TV Shows From Worst to Best
- ‘Bad Teacher’ can look back at some movie-to-TV shows for inspiration — or a warning
- 8 Terrible TV Shows Based On Iconic Films Of The Past
