= Helen McCloy =

American novelist

Helen McCloy (6 June 1904 – 1 December 1994), pseudonym Helen Clarkson, was an American mystery writer, whose series character Dr. Basil Willing debuted in Dance of Death (1938). Willing believes, that "every criminal leaves psychic fingerprints, and he can't wear gloves to hide them." He appeared in 13 of McCloy's novels and in several of her short stories. McCloy often used the theme of doppelganger, but in the end of the story she showed a psychological or realistic explanation for the seemingly supernatural events.

== Biography ==
Helen McCloy was born on 6 June 1904 in New York City. Her mother was the writer Helen Worrell McCloy and her father, William McCloy, was the longtime managing editor of the New York Evening Sun. She was educated at the Brooklyn Friends School, run by Brooklyn's Quaker community. In 1923 she went to France and studied at the Sorbonne. After finishing her studies, she worked for William Randolph Hearst's International News Service (1927–1932). Then she was an art critic for International Studio and other magazines, and free-lance contributor to London Morning Post and Parnassus. She returned to the United States in 1932.

In 1946 McCloy married Davis Dresser, who had gained fame with his Mike Shayne novels, written under the pseudonym Brett Halliday. In 1948 they had a daughter, Chloe; McCloy was 44 years old. She founded with Dresser the Torquil Publishing Company and a literary agency (Halliday and McCloy). Their marriage ended in 1961. In the 1950s and 1960s McCloy was a co-author of review column for Connecticut newspapers and in 1950 she became the first woman to serve as president of Mystery Writers of America. In 1954 she received an Edgar award from the same organization for her criticism. McCloy helped to found in 1971 a New England chapter of the Mystery Writers of America in Boston.

She died on 1 December 1994 in Woodstock, New York.

== Writing Career ==
Having read the Sherlock Holmes stories as a young girl, McCloy retained an interest in mysteries and began to write them in the 1930s. Her first novel, Dance of Death, was published in 1938. It was followed by several other mystery publications in the 1940s. Cue for Murder (1942) was a story of murder onstage during a Broadway revival of Sardou's Fédora. In Goblin Market (1943), reporters for two rival wire services investigate the death of one of their predecessors in a fictional South American country in the shadow of World War Two. The One That Got Away (1945) explored the psychology of Fascism, postulating that it is rooted in woman hatred, and rejection of a mother's tender care of children. A non-Willing mystery, Panic (1944), was set in a remote cottage in the Catskills and was notable for its use of cryptoanalysis.

In Mr. Splitfoot (1968) Dr. Basil Willing and his wife take shelter at a remote house in New England, where they must lodge in a haunted room. The title refers to the Devil, but Mr Splitfoot is also a symbol for the two sides of our nature, as Willing points out. The critic and mystery writer H.R.F. Keating included the work in 1987 among the 100 best crime and mystery books ever published.

Another successful work is the eighth Basil Willing novel, Through a Glass, Darkly (1950), a supernatural puzzle in the tradition of John Dickson Carr. "If you want to scare yourself still in bed, it's just the thing for you," the English writer Pamela Hansford Johnson said of the book. Boucher and McComas praised the novel as "an eerie study of the phenomenon of the Doppelganger,. .. handled with such disquieting ambivalence that the 'rational' solution seems only an instance of man's folly in the face of the unknowable.".

In The Impostor (1977) a woman, Marina, recovers consciousness after a car crash to find herself in a psychiatric clinic. She recalls the accident clearly but she's told that all is her delusion. A man arrives, not her husband, but to get away she accepts the impostor. McCloy used in the story a cryptological double bluff. She had read about it in 1944 when she was writing Panic, but because she was unable to trace the source, she improvised her own version of it.

== Works ==
=== Dr. Basil Willing Series ===
- Dance of Death (1938). uk title: Design for Dying
- The Man in the Moonlight (1940)
- The Deadly Truth (1941)
- Who's Calling (1942)
- Cue for Murder (1942)
- The Goblin Market (1943)
- The One That Got Away (1945)
- Through a Glass, Darkly (1950). Serialised (New York) Daily News, 6 November 1949 to 15 January 1950
- Alias Basil Willing (1951)
- The Long Body (1955)
- Two-Thirds of a Ghost (1956)
- Mr. Splitfoot (1968)
- Burn This (1980)
- The Pleasant Assassin and Other Cases of Dr. Basil Willing (Short Stories) (Crippen & Landru, 2003)

=== Non-Series ===
- Do Not Disturb (1943)
- Panic (1944)
- She Walks Alone (1948). aka: Wish You Were Dead
- Better Off Dead (1951)
- Unfinished Crime (1954). uk title: He Never Came Back
- The Slayer and the Slain (1957)
- Before I Die (1963)
- The Singing Diamonds and Other Stories (Short Stories) (1965)
- The Further Side of Fear (1967)
- A Question of Time (1971)
- A Change of Heart (1973)
- The Sleepwalker (1974)
- Minotaur Country (1975)
- The Changeling Conspiracy (1976). uk title: Cruel as the Grave
- The Impostor (1977)
- The Smoking Mirror (1979)

==== Uncollected short stories ====
- Rain before Seven. (New York) Daily News, 11 April 1934
- The Shell Game. Tampa Tribune, 17 June 1934
- The Miracle. (New York) Daily News, 29 June 1934
- Brenda Fixes Everything. (New York) Daily News, 18 January 1935

=== Written as Helen Clarkson ===
- The Last Day (1959)
