= Michael Shayne (radio program) =

Michael Shayne is a generic title that can refer to any of three American old-time radio detective programs that were broadcast from 1944 to 1953, all based on the Michael Shayne character created by author Brett Halliday. Specific titles varied with different versions of the show. They included Michael Shayne, Private Detective, The New Adventures of Michael Shayne, and The Adventures of Michael Shayne.

Shayne was the main character in each version of the program, Phyllis Knight, a combination of secretary, sidekick, and girlfriend for Shayne, was also featured in the first and third versions, but the character did not appear in The New Adventures of Michael Shayne.

== Michael Shayne, Private Detective ==
The first radio version had Wally Maher in the title role. Louise Arthur initially portrayed Knight, and Joe Forte played the police inspector. Cathy Lewis replaced Arthur in the spring of 1945.

For two years, this version was broadcast only in the western United States, debuting on the Don Lee Network on October 16, 1944. It was on Mondays at 8:30 Pacific Time initially and then moved to Wednesdays at 7 p.m. P.T., sponsored by Union Oil Company. On October 15, 1946, it moved to the nationwide Mutual network on Tuesdays at 8 p.m. Eastern Time with Hastings Piston Rings as sponsor.

== The New Adventures of Michael Shayne ==
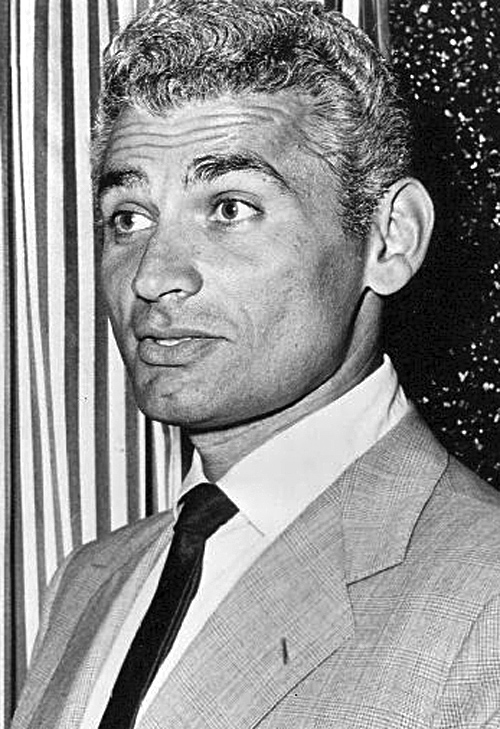
Actor Jeff Chandler played Shayne in the radio series.

The second version was a transcribed program with Jeff Chandler in the title role. Don W. Sharpe was the producer. Knight was not a character in this version, which was set in New Orleans. The program was produced by Searles & Parks Inc. Bill Rousseau was the director.

== The Adventures of Michael Shayne ==
ABC radio carried The Adventures of Michael Shayne from October 14, 1952, until July 10, 1953. Donald Curtis had the title role until November 1952. He was succeeded by Robert Sterling and Vinton Hayworth. Judith Parrish portrayed Knight, and Rousseau was the director. John Duffy provided the music. In November 1952, the program's time slot changed from Tuesdays at 8 p.m. to Thursdays at 9:30. In February 1953, it moved to Fridays at 8 p.m.
