= Sleepers East =

1934 film directed by Kenneth MacKenna

- Directed by: Kenneth MacKenna
- Screenplay by: Lester Cole
- Based on: Sleepers East by Frederick Nebel
- Produced by: Sol M. Wurtzel
- Starring: Wynne Gibson; Preston Foster; Mona Barrie; Harvey Stephens; Roger Imhof; J. Carrol Naish
- Cinematography: Ernest Palmer
- Production company: Fox Film Corporation
- Distributed by: Fox Film Corporation
- Release date: January 26, 1934
- Running time: 64 minutes
- Country: United States
- Language: English

Sleepers East is a 1934 American pre-Code crime film directed by Kenneth MacKenna and written by Lester Cole. It is based on the 1933 novel Sleepers East by Frederick Nebel. The film stars Wynne Gibson, Preston Foster, Mona Barrie, Harvey Stephens, Roger Imhof and J. Carrol Naish. The film was released on January 26, 1934, by Fox Film Corporation. The novel was also used as inspiration for the 1941 film Sleepers West.

== Cast ==
- Wynne Gibson as Lena Karelson
- Preston Foster as Jason Everett
- Mona Barrie as Ada Robillard
- Harvey Stephens as Martin Knox
- Roger Imhof as MacGowan
- J. Carrol Naish as Carl Izzard
- Suzanne Kaaren as Dixie
- Howard Lally as Jack Wentworth
