= MSMM =

MSMM may refer to:

- Mahou Shoujo Madoka Magica
- Mike Shayne Mystery Magazine
