= Michael Shayne, Private Detective =

1940 film

- Directed by: Eugene Forde
- Screenplay by: Stanley Rauh; Manning O'Connor
- Based on: Dividend on Death; 1934 novel by Brett Halliday
- Produced by: Sol M. Wurtzel
- Starring: Lloyd Nolan; Marjorie Weaver; Joan Valerie
- Cinematography: George Schneiderman
- Edited by: Alfred DeGaetano
- Music by: Cyril J. Mockridge
- Production company: 20th Century Fox
- Distributed by: 20th Century Fox
- Release date: December 19, 1940
- Running time: 77 minutes
- Country: United States
- Language: English

Michael Shayne, Private Detective is a 1940 American mystery film directed by Eugene Forde and starring Lloyd Nolan, Marjorie Weaver and Joan Valerie. It is based on Brett Halliday's novel The Private Practice of Michael Shayne. It was the first in a series of Michael Shayne films starring Nolan.

== Plot ==
Out-of-work private detective Mike Shayne is hired by his friend, wealthy racing executive Hiram Brighton, to, while he is out of town, watch over his spirited daughter Phyllis, who gambles her money away and has begun dating underworld character Harry Grange, to the consternation of the father.

The key plot involves wealthy but shady Elliott Thomas who owned a horse, Banjo Boy. The odds were 15 to 1 against that horse winning. Thomas had a run of bad luck and needed a quick infusion of cash. In South America he found a champion to switch with the same markings as, and a dead-ringer for, Banjo Boy. So as not to affect the track odds, Thomas engaged Grange as a shill to "spread around" Thomas' large bet of $10,000. The substitute horse wins, and the payoff is $150,000 (equivalent to over $3 million in 2025 purchasing power).

But Grange would not pay Thomas his money, so Thomas hired another shady character, Larry Kincaid, who tries to hire Shayne to go to Shayne's friend and Grange's boss, casino owner Benny Gordon, to ask him to pressure Grange. Shayne refused, so Kincaid went straight to Grange. When Grange told Kincaid the backstory, Kincaid decided to cut himself in on the pot by blackmailing Thomas.

As a result, Thomas and Kincaid brawled, Kincaid ended up dead, and Grange knew of the meeting. At that point, Thomas felt he had no choice but to do away with Grange.

Shortly before Thomas kills Grange, after a meeting in Gordon's casino, Grange had been drugged, then driven to the woods, smeared with ketchup and left in the convertible by Shayne in a scheme to teach Phyllis a lesson about hanging around with shady characters. The scheme backfires when they find Grange has actually been shot dead and Shayne's gun is on the ground, having been fired. Shayne has already tipped the police to "a murder in the woods" in the plan to scare Phyllis. Now sirens are heard. Shayne rushes Phillis away in her car but his car will not start, and the cops arrest him.

In reality, Gordon's daughter Marsha, Grange's angry ex who had been jilted by Grange, happened to stumble upon the crime scene first, became distraught and rushed to her father. In order to protect her from any kind of suspicion, Gordon framed Shayne, having conveniently seen him leave the casino earlier with Grange.

Eventually, Shayne correctly deduces what happened with the murder of Grange, and engineers a trap for Thomas in front of the police, at which point Thomas confesses the horse race plot, the death of Kincaid and throwing his body in the bay, and the murder of Grange.

== Cast ==
- Lloyd Nolan as Michael Shayne
- Marjorie Weaver as Phyllis Brighton
- Joan Valerie as Marsha Gordon
- Walter Abel as Elliott Thomas
- Elizabeth Patterson as Aunt Olivia
- Donald MacBride as Chief Painter
- Douglass Dumbrille as Gordon
- Clarence Kolb as Hiram Brighton
- George Meeker as Harry Grange
- Charles Coleman as Ponsby
- Adrian Morris as Al
- Robert Emmett Keane as Larry Kincaid
- Frank Orth as Steve
- Irving Bacon as Fisherman

Uncredited cast members include:

- Jimmy Aubrey as Mac
- Don Brodie as Reporter
- Paul E. Burns as Furniture Company Mover
- James Conaty as Gambler
- Robert Conway as Riverside Terrace Desk Clerk
- Sayre Dearing as Racetrack Spectator
- Ralph Dunn as First Bartender
- Fern Emmett as Jenny
- Bess Flowers as Racetrack Spectator
- Dick French as Reporter
- Harold Goodwin as Reporter
- Sherry Hall as 2nd Bartender
- Paul Kruger as Parking Attendant
- Hamilton MacFadden as Reporter
- Tony Martelli as Gambler
- Major McBride as Croupier
- Frank Mills as Counterman
- Edmund Mortimer as Gambling Casino Patron
- Field Norton as Gambler
- Paddy O'Flynn as Reporter
- James Pierce as Burly Man Downstairs
- Dick Rich as Mover
- Jack Richardson as Gambler
- Cyril Ring as Reporter
- Bob Rose as Freddy
- S.S. Simon as Nightclub Patron
- Larry Steers as Racetrack Spectator

== Bibliography ==
- Backer, Ron. Mystery Movie Series of 1940s Hollywood. McFarland, 2010.
