= Patricia Donahue =

American actress (1925–2012)

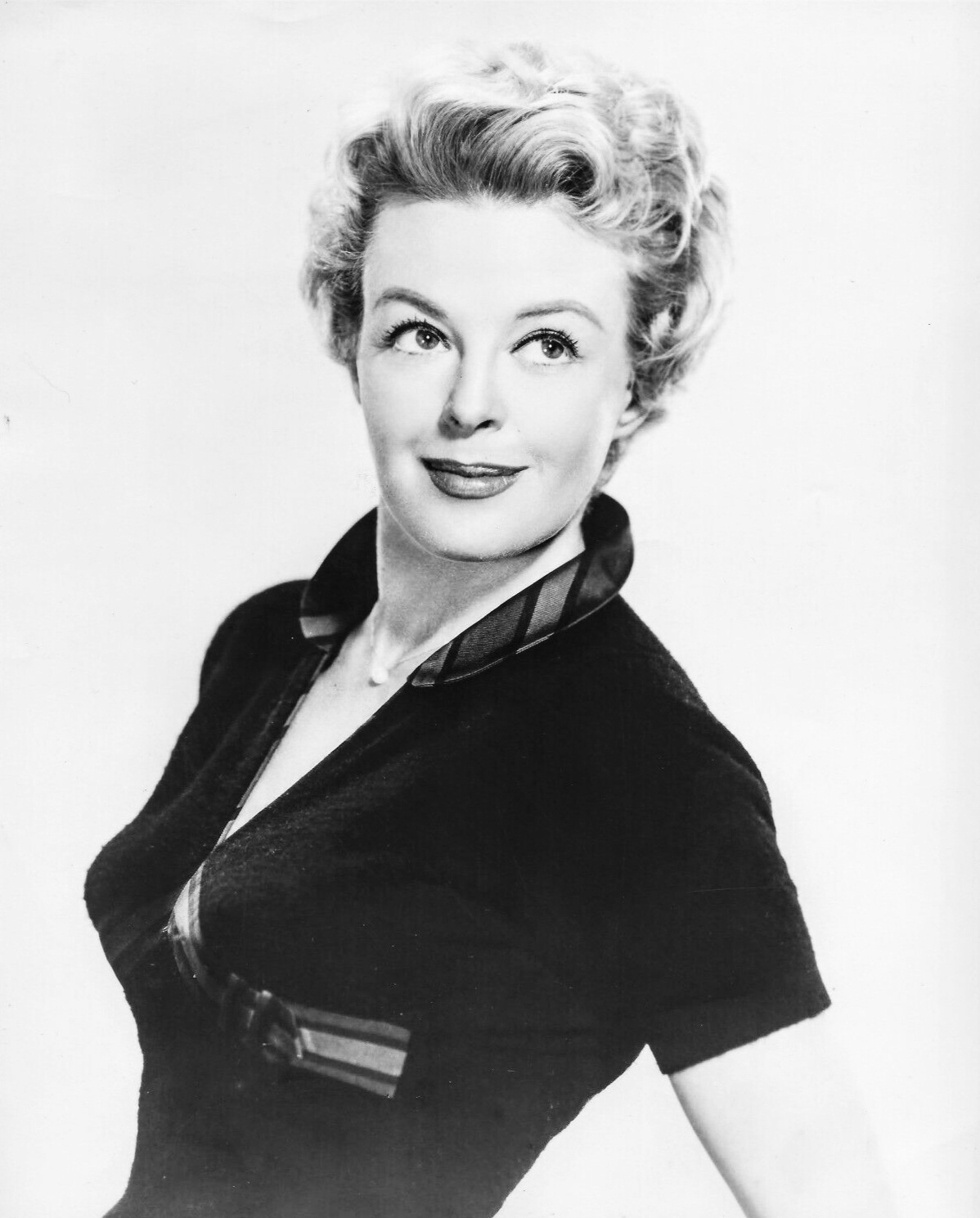
- A promotional photo of Donahue from the 1950s
- Born: March 6, 1925; New York City, U.S.
- Died: June 11, 2012 (aged 87); U.S.
- Occupation: Actress
- Years active: 1956–1984
- Spouses: Sam Donahue (m. 1946; div. 1954); Euan Lloyd (m. 1961; div. 1980)
- Children: Jerry Donahue; Marc Donahue

Patricia Donahue (née Maher, March 6, 1925 – June 11, 2012) was an American actress who appeared in television and films from 1956 to 1984. She is best known for portraying Lucy Hamilton, the secretary in the television series Michael Shayne (1960–1961), and for her roles in films such as The Fastest Guitar Alive (1967) and Cutter's Way (1981). Donahue was married to bandleader Sam Donahue and later to film producer Euan Lloyd.

== Early life and family ==
Patricia Maher was born in New York City on March 6, 1925. Her father, Thomas Maher, was a vaudeville performer. Before launching her acting career, she worked as a model and studied drama in the city.

She married big-band leader Sam Donahue in 1946, and the couple had two sons: noted guitarist Jerry Donahue (born 1946) and music composer and actor Marc Donahue (born 1953). The marriage ended in divorce on December 22, 1954. She subsequently married British film producer Euan Lloyd.

== Career ==
Donahue began her screen career in 1954, playing small, uncredited roles in feature films. She didn't receive her first screen lead until 1957, when she played a foil to comedians Huntz Hall and Stanley Clements in the lowbrow Bowery Boys comedy In the Money. The film, released in January 1958, was the 48th and final Bowery Boys feature. After that she turned to television, in which she worked exclusively for the next four years.

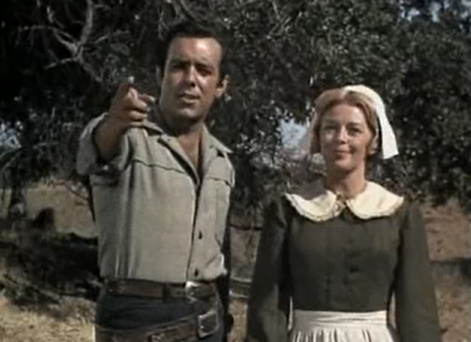
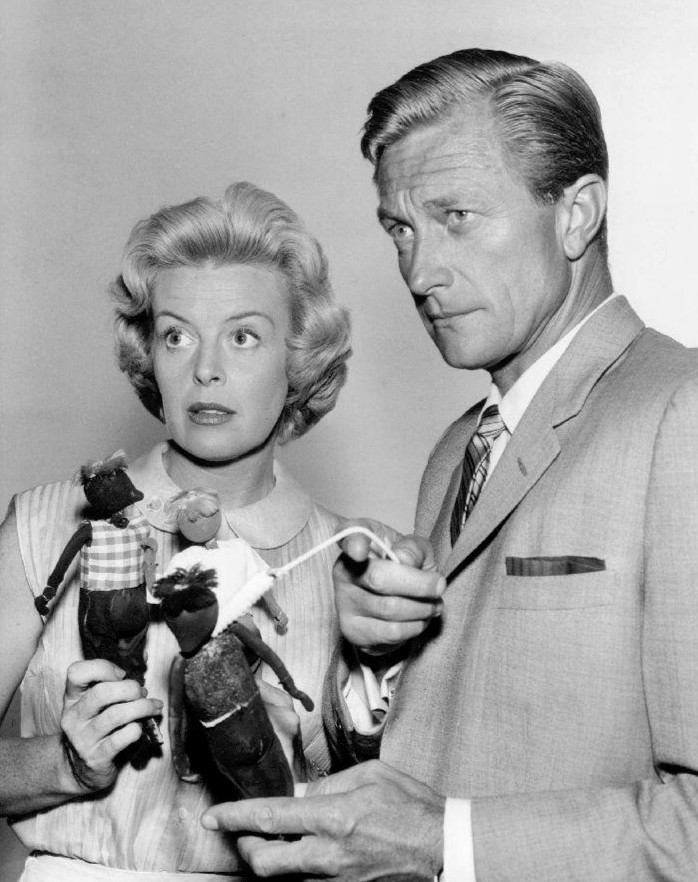
Pernell Roberts and Donahue in Bonanza (left). Donahue and Richard Denning in Michael Shayne (right).

Following her first lead role, Donahue established her career working primarily in Hollywood, California, appearing in numerous television productions throughout the late 1950s. After marrying British film producer Euan Lloyd in 1961, she relocated to the United Kingdom, where she continued to act in British productions. She returned to Hollywood in 1966 and was shortly after cast in a "top role" in the film The Fastest Guitar Alive (1967). She also appeared in the films A Boy Ten Feet Tall, Paper Tiger, Cutter's Way, and others.

Donahue portrayed Lucy Hamilton, secretary to the title character in the Michael Shayne TV series. She also appeared in such television series as Checkmate, Death Valley Days, Goodyear Theatre, The Californians, The Walter Winchell File, Tales of Wells Fargo, The Thin Man, The Millionaire, Mr. Adams and Eve, The Twilight Zone, General Electric Theater, Perry Mason, Peter Gunn, 77 Sunset Strip, Bachelor Father, Bat Masterson, Mr. Lucky, Bonanza, The Wide World of Mystery, Thriller, Danger Man,(AKA Secret Agent Man in USA) The Saint (episode : The Charitable Countess), The Alfred Hitchcock Hour (Dear Uncle George), and dozens of other programs.

== Death ==
Patricia Donahue died in her sleep on June 11, 2012, at the age of 87, due to a blood clot (surgical blood clot) following a recent operation.

== Selected filmography ==
- Perry Mason (1959, 1962)
  - Season 3 Episode 9: "The Case of the Artful Dodger" as Louise Fulton
  - Season 5 Episode 25: "The Case of the Angry Astronaut" as Bonnie Winslow
- A Stop at Willoughby (1960) (The Twilight Zone (1959 TV series))
- Alfred Hitchcock Presents (1961) (Season 6 Episode 33: "A Secret Life") as Marjorie Howgill
- The Alfred Hitchcock Hour (1963) (Season 1 Episode 30: "Dear Uncle George") as Louise Chambers
