= Melody in May =

- Directed by: Ben Holmes
- Written by: Stanley Rauh (story)
- Produced by: Bert Gilroy (associate producer); Lee S. Marcus (producer)
- Starring: See below
- Cinematography: Nicholas Musuraca
- Edited by: Edward Mann
- Release date: 1936
- Running time: 20 minutes
- Country: United States
- Language: English

Melody in May is a 1936 American short film starring singer Ruth Etting directed by Ben Holmes.

== Plot ==
The movie opens with Ruth Etting (as herself) recording "St. Louis Blues", after which she declares that she is taking a month off, and going to where no-one can find her. This turns out to be Middleton, which is so small it has no hotel. Ruth rents a room over the local ice-cream parlor, where high-school student Tommy Bradshaw works for his mother, who owns the store and rooming house.

Over her ice cream, Ruth overhears Tommy's fellow students remarking on his social awkwardness. Tonight is the school dance, which Tommy won't attend, because he can't dance, and because Mary, the only girl he is interested in, is going with Chuck, the school heartthrob. However, Chuck is expected to be out of town that night, so as Mary leaves, she asks Tommy to take her, and he ecstatically agrees.

That evening, as Tommy is stepping out to get Mary, she pulls up in a car being driven by Chuck, who is staying after all, and Mary gives Tommy her regrets. Tommy offers his tickets to Chuck, who tears them up. Witnessing this exchange, Ruth asks Tommy to take her to the dance instead.

At the dance, everyone remarks on Tommy's choice of a much older date. To rescue the situation, Ruth sings "It Had to Be You", accompanied by the excellent live band (which happens to be playing there for reasons not explained). At that point, everyone realizes who Ruth is, and Tommy is suddenly besieged by boys wanting to dance with Ruth, and by girls wanting him to come to upcoming events.

After the dance, Mary asks Tommy to take her home. Chuck objects, and when he sets up to clean Tommy's clock, Tommy gets in a sucker punch that lays his opponent out cold. Ruth lends Tommy her car to take Mary home. Mary comments on how events have conspired to make Tommy show his "new ego".

== Cast ==
- Ruth Etting as Herself
- Frank Coghlan Jr. as Tommy Bradshaw
- Margaret Armstrong as Ma Bradshaw
- Joan Sheldon as Mary Callahan
- Kenneth Howell as Chuck
- Robert Meredith as Boy

== Soundtrack ==
- Ruth Etting - "St. Louis Blues" (By W. C. Handy)
- Ruth Etting - "It Had to Be You" (By Isham Jones and Gus Kahn (lyrics))
