= Dressed to Kill (1941 film) =

1941 film

- Original film poster
- Directed by: Eugene Forde
- Screenplay by: Brett Halliday; Manning O'Conner; Stanley Ruth
- Based on: The Dead Take No Bows; 1941 novel by Richard Burke
- Produced by: Sol M. Wurtzel
- Starring: Lloyd Nolan; Mary Beth Hughes; Sheila Ryan; William Demarest
- Cinematography: Glen MacWilliams
- Edited by: Fred Allen
- Music by: Cyril J. Mockridge
- Production company: 20th Century Fox
- Distributed by: 20th Century Fox
- Release date: August 8, 1941
- Running time: 74 minutes
- Country: United States
- Language: English

Dressed to Kill is a 1941 American mystery film directed by Eugene Forde and starring Lloyd Nolan, Mary Beth Hughes, and Sheila Ryan. It was produced and distributed by 20th Century Fox, one of several films to feature the private detective Michael Shayne. The film is based on The Dead Take No Bows, a mystery novel by Richard Burke.

== Plot ==
Private investigator Michael Shayne and his singer fiancée Joanne La Marr hear a woman screaming from a room in their hotel. The hotel maid Emily has discovered two dead people - producer Louis Lathrop, owner of the hotel and the adjoining theater, and Desiree Vance, one of Lathrop's actresses. Both are dressed in medieval costumes, and Lathrop is wearing the head from a dog costume.

Police investigator Pierson arrives at the scene and learns from hotel manager Hal Brennon that the costumes are from Lathrop's only successful show, Sweethearts of Paris, from many years earlier. Desiree had been the show's leading lady, and Carlo Ralph played Beppo the Dog. Shayne suspects Carlo because of the dog-costume head on Lathrop.

David Earle, also an actor in Lathrop's show, tells the police that Lathrop had hosted a private party for the entire cast to celebrate its anniversary. Shayne examines the list of those involved in the production and discovers that the musical director was Max Allaron, an alcoholic who also lives at the hotel.

As the investigation proceeds, Shayne learns that Lathrop kept another woman in addition to Desiree and that the apartment has many entrances and exits. From Earle's daughter, he learns that cast member Julian Davis stole money from Lathrop, so he visits Davis and finds him with Phyllis Lathrop, Louis's wife. They confess to embezzling money from Louis, but claim to be innocent of his murder. They hire Shayne to help them prove their innocence.

Shayne continues his investigation and talks to Allaron. He learns that Carlo died in World War I in France, but then discovers a letter from Carlo in Desiree's room that proves that Carlo is still alive.

Shayne brings Davis to the Lathrop apartment, and they discover a hidden passage to the maid Emily's room downstairs. They find Emily's dead body and a note explaining that she had killed Lathrop because he had betrayed her years earlier for another woman. Emily was once known as actress Lynn Evans.

Shayne does not believe that Emily has killed herself, so he continues searching for the killer. When Shayne is back in Lathrop's apartment, Pierson is knocked unconscious in the next room by Allaron. Otto Kahn, the theater doorman, arrives and confesses that he killed Lathrop and Desiree. He is really Carlo, and he was married to Desiree before she had left him for Lathrop. He also killed Emily because she had discovered too much about him. Allaron has been blackmailing Carlo, whom he saw leaving the apartment right after the killings. While they are talking, Pierson regains consciousness, and together with Shayne, he overpowers Otto and Allaron.

Shayne asks Pierson to be his best man at the wedding later in the day, but Shayne then learns that Joanne has eloped with her ex-boyfriend because she grew tired of waiting for Shayne.

== Cast ==
- Lloyd Nolan as Michael Shayne
- Mary Beth Hughes as Joanne La Marr
- Sheila Ryan as Connie Earle
- William Demarest as Inspector Pierson
- Mantan Moreland as Rusty (identified in the end credits as Sam)
- Virginia Brissac as Lynne Evans, aka Emily, the maid
- Erwin Kalser as Otto Kahn/Carlo Ralph
- Henry Daniell as Julian Davis
- Dick Rich as Al
- Milton Parsons as Max Allaron
- Charles Arnt as Hal Brennon
- Charles Trowbridge as David Earle
- Hamilton MacFadden as Reporter
- May Beatty as Phyllis Lathrop
- Charles Wilson as Editor
- Ben Carter as Sam (identified in the end credits as Rusty)

== Production ==
Dressed to Kill was the third in a series of Michael Shayne detective films. The first group of seven was produced by 20th Century Fox and starred Lloyd Nolan. The latter five were produced by Producers Releasing Corporation and starred Hugh Beaumont. Three radio shows (1944–1953) and a television series (1960–1961) also were based on the Shayne character.

== Reception ==
Upon the film's release on DVD in 2005, DVD Talk wrote, "At just 74 minutes Dressed to Kill is innocuous fun, though like most of Fox's mysteries from the period, it leans heavily on the charm of its actors rather than the ingenuity of its writing."

Hal Erickson of Allmovie wrote, "[the film] benefits from a powerhouse supporting cast and the effectively moody cinematography of Glenn MacWilliams."
