= Dividend on Death =

1939 book by Brett Halliday

- Author: Brett Halliday
- Language: English
- Genre: Detective
- Publication date: 1939
- Publication place: United States
- Media type: Print

Dividend on Death is a 1939 detective novel by the American writer Brett Halliday. It was the first novel in Halliday's Michael Shayne series of novels, portraying the investigations of a private detective. It also introduced the character of Phyllis Brighton, who became Shayne's wife. It was followed in 1940 by a second novel The Private Practice of Michael Shayne. When a film version of Michael Shayne was made, it borrowed some elements from the first novel but was largely based on The Private Practice of Michael Shayne.

== Bibliography ==
- Backer, Ron. Mystery Movie Series of 1940s Hollywood. McFarland, 2010.
