= Just Off Broadway =

1942 film by Herbert I. Leeds

- Directed by: Herbert I. Leeds
- Written by: Brett Halliday; Jo Eisinger
- Screenplay by: Arnaud d'Usseau
- Produced by: Sol M. Wurtzel
- Starring: Lloyd Nolan; Marjorie Weaver; Phil Silvers
- Cinematography: Lucien N. Andriot
- Edited by: Louis R. Loeffler
- Music by: David Raksin
- Distributed by: Twentieth Century Fox Film Corporation
- Release date: September 25, 1942
- Running time: 65 minutes
- Country: United States
- Language: English

Just Off Broadway is a 1942 Drama directed by Herbert I. Leeds, starring Lloyd Nolan and Marjorie Weaver. This is the sixth in a series of seven films featuring Lloyd Nolan playing Michael Shayne for Twentieth Century Fox. Hugh Beaumont portrayed Shayne in five more films from Producers Releasing Corporation.

== Plot ==
Michael Shayne, a private investigator, flees from jury duty to prove the defendant's guilt. He and Judy Taylor, a reporter, begin looking into the suspect's alibis and discover that in addition to the murder he stands trial for, the man has also killed two others. Afterward, the detective is jailed for 60 days for defecting from the jury.

== Cast ==
- Lloyd Nolan as Michael Shayne
- Marjorie Weaver as Judy Taylor
- Phil Silvers as Roy Higgins
- Janis Carter as Lillian Hubbard
- Richard Derr as John Logan, Defense Attorney
- Joan Valerie as Rita Darling
- Don Costello as George Dolphin
- Chester Clute as Sperty, Juror-Roommate
- Francis Pierlot as Sidney Arno, Jeweler
- Grant Richards as District Attorney John F. McGonagle
- George M. Carleton as Judge Robert Walters
- Alexander Lockwood as Count Edmond Telmachio
- William Haade as Warehouse Watchman
- Leyland Hodgson as Henry Randolph, Butler
- Oscar O'Shea as Pop, Stage Door Watchman
- Mary Field as Maid
