= Special Agent 7 =

- Genre: Crime drama
- Directed by: Richard H. Bartlett; Richard Irving; William Witney
- Starring: Lloyd Nolan
- Country of origin: United States
- Original language: English
- No. of seasons: 1
- No. of episodes: 26

Production
- Producers: Joseph T. Naar; Richard Irving
- Cinematography: John L. Russell; Bud Thackery
- Editor: Richard G. Wray
- Camera setup: Single-camera
- Running time: 22–24 minutes
- Production company: Revue Productions

Original release
- Network: Syndication
- Release: 1958 – 1959

Special Agent 7 is a 1958 American TV series starring Lloyd Nolan.

== Premise ==
Special Agent Philip Conroy (Nolan) works for the Internal Revenue Service.

== Cast ==
- Lloyd Nolan as Philip Conroy
