= The Bribe =

1950 film by Robert Zigler Leonard

- Theatrical release poster
- Directed by: Robert Z. Leonard
- Screenplay by: Marguerite Roberts
- Based on: "The Bribe"; 1947 short story in Hearst's-International Cosmopolitan by Frederick Nebel
- Produced by: Pandro S. Berman
- Starring: Robert Taylor; Ava Gardner; Charles Laughton
- Cinematography: Joseph Ruttenberg
- Edited by: Gene Ruggiero
- Music by: Miklós Rózsa
- Production company: Metro-Goldwyn-Mayer
- Distributed by: Loew's Inc.
- Release date: February 3, 1949 (United States)
- Running time: 98 minutes
- Country: United States
- Language: English
- Budget: $1,984,000
- Box office: $2,510,000

The Bribe is a 1949 American film noir directed by Robert Z. Leonard and written by Marguerite Roberts, based on a story written by Frederick Nebel. The film stars Robert Taylor, Ava Gardner, Charles Laughton, and Vincent Price.

== Plot ==
In Washington D.C., federal agent Rigby is briefed on a racketeering ring that has been selling and retrofitting war surplus aircraft motors for profit, off the coast of Central America. The government suspects Tugwell 'Tug' Hintten and his wife Elizabeth are part of the racket. Tasked to recover the motors and raid their headquarters, Rigby travels to Los Trancos on the island of Carlotta, posing as a sportsman. There, he arrives at a nightclub where Elizabeth sings. After she performs, Rigby enters her dressing room and shares drinks with her and Tugwell, who passes out after a night of drinking.

Over a few days, Rigby and Elizabeth begin a flirtatious romance. Rigby arrives at a bar where J.J. Bealer offers him $10,000 to leave the island, but Rigby declines. Rigby also suspects Carwood of being affiliated with Bealer. Regardless, he and Carwood venture on a fishing expedition the next day. Rigby catches a large fish, but the expedition turns deadly when their friend Emilio is killed by a shark. Rigby notifies Emilio's father Pablo, who confirms Rigby's suspicions that Carwood is involved and wants his son's killers brought to justice.

The same night, Elizabeth meets with Rigby and confesses her intentions to divorce Tugwell. However, she learns that her husband has fallen ill. Rigby, in love with Elizabeth, becomes torn in his investigative duties and wanting to protect her from prosecution, while declining Bealer's bribes. After an unsuccessful attempt to locate the headquarters, Bealer shows Rigby his X-ray photos confirming Elizabeth's involvement in the racket. Later on, Bealer tells Elizabeth that Rigby is a federal agent and schemes to drug him so they can leave the island with the money.

Elizabeth drugs Rigby's cocktail and he loses consciousness but she immediately feels remorse. Meanwhile, Carwood suffocates Tugwell for talking too much. Back in his hotel room, Rigby recovers and meets with Elizabeth at the nightclub. Backstage, he defuses a confrontation with Bealer, who states Carwood had murdered Tugwell. Rigby arranges with Bealer to have Carwood brought in to be arrested. When Bealer complies, a gunfight between Rigby and Carwood ensues. Carwood escapes and runs into a carnival parade, where he is fatally shot. Rigby returns to the hotel and kisses Elizabeth.

== Cast ==
- Robert Taylor as Rigby
- Ava Gardner as Elizabeth Hintten
- Charles Laughton as J.J. Bealer
- Vincent Price as Carwood
- John Hodiak as Tugwell 'Tug' Hintten
- Samuel S. Hinds as Dr. Warren
- John Hoyt as Gibbs
- Martin Garralaga as Pablo Gomez

== Reception ==
=== Box office ===
According to MGM records, The Bribe earned $1,559,000 in the U.S. and Canada and $951,000 globally, resulting in a loss to the studio of $322,000.

=== Critical reception ===
Bosley Crowther of The New York Times lambasted the drama in his film review, writing "If you plan to put down your money to see the Capitol's The Bribe, we suggest that you be prepared to write off this extravagance as a folly and nothing more. For The Bribe is the sort of temptation which Hollywood put in the way of gullible moviegoers about twenty years ago. It's a piece of pure romantic fiction, as lurid as it is absurd. And if it didn't have several big 'names' in it, it would be low-man on a 'grind house' triple-bill...The only hint which the director, Robert Z. Leonard, gives that he may have meant it all as pure nonsense comes at the very end, when he blows up the place with pyrotechnics. That's the one appropriate move in the whole show."

The Brooklyn Eagle found the film "a synthetic dish, obviously whipped up on one of M-G-M's mammoth back lots with a minimum of juice, nourishment and flavor, meaning conviction and excitement. Or, to put it another way, 'The Bribe' is a melodrama with a transparent facade. You're continually aware of actors busy at make-believe, a director telling them what to do and, in a more remote spot, a writer sweating over his typewriter to think up good, hot situations....Laughton's self-enjoyment at slicing the ham thick is passable fun to watch, which is more than can be said for the others. Taylor, Gardner, Price and Hodiak, they simply put in time and effort, little else."

The Time Out film guide included the following in their review: "Price and Laughton make a formidable pair of heavies in this otherwise feeble thriller shot on a cheaply rigged-up corner of the MGM backlot. Taylor isn't up to moral dilemma as a US government agent sent to crack illicit aircraft engine trading in the Caribbean, yet tempted by a lucrative cash offer and the irresistible charm of café chanteuse Gardner."

Critic Leslie Halliwell wrote in his film guide "Steamy melodrama with pretensions but only moderate entertainment value despite high gloss. The rogues gallery, however, are impressive."

In the book Cult Movies, Karl French and Philip French write "In classic noir style, the chain smoking Rigby (he has no Christian name) tells most of the story in flashbacks that begin as visions he sees on the rain-lashed window of his hotel room. His voiceover narration continues as he battles with his conscience and tries to retain his honour in a world reeking of corruption. Laughton and Price are splendidly hammy villains and Gardner's nightclub singer is an innocent femme fatale in the manner of Rita Hayworth's Gilda."

== Legacy ==
Scenes and characters from The Bribe are used in Dead Men Don't Wear Plaid, a 1982 film parody by Carl Reiner, in which Steve Martin's character is named Rigby and is searching for friends and enemies of Carlotta.
