= It Had to Be You (song) =

1924 song by Isham Jones and Gus Kahn

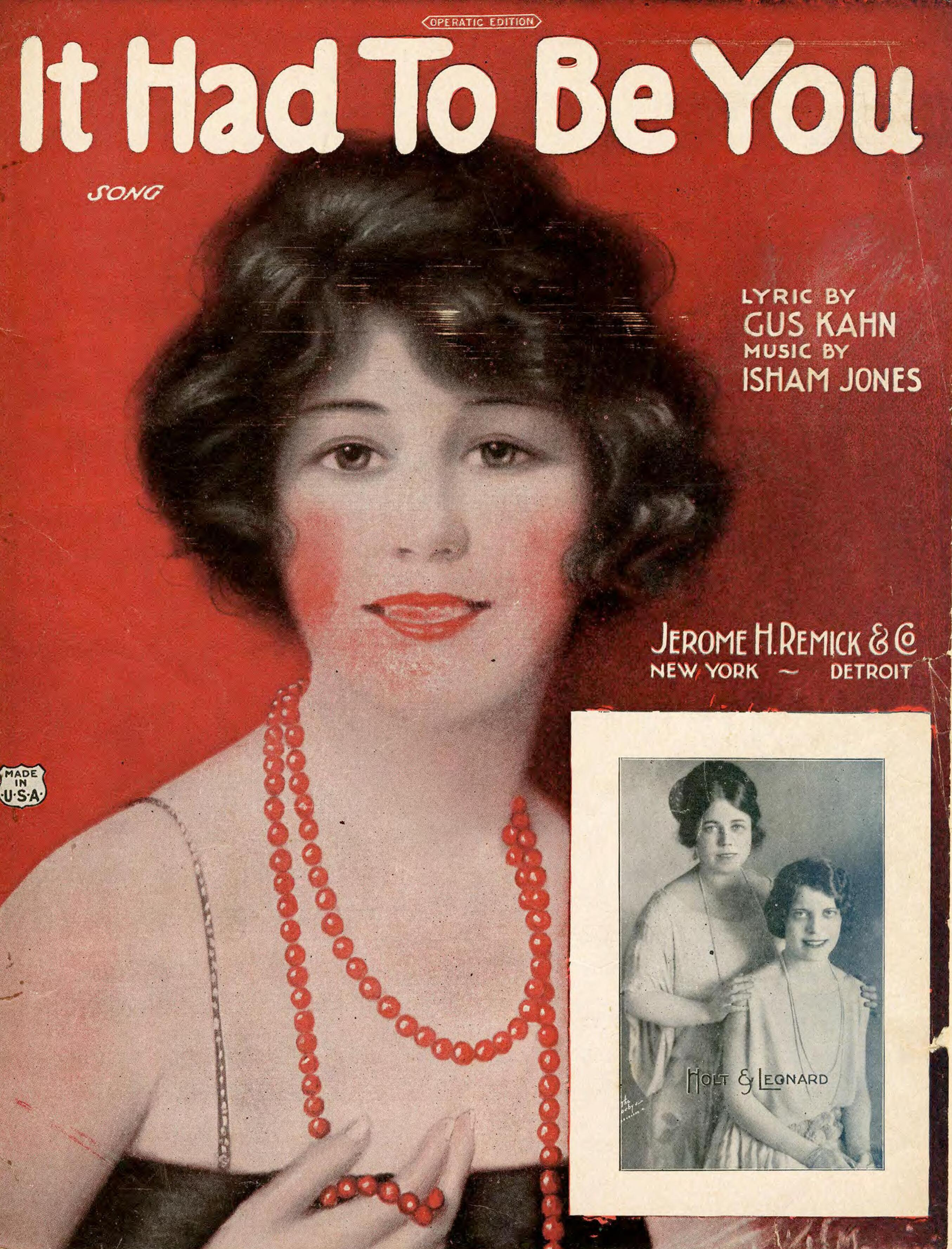
- Sheet music cover, 1924

Song by Isham Jones Orchestra
- B-side: "After the Storm"
- Published: May 9, 1924 by Jerome H. Remick & Co.
- Released: July 1924
- Recorded: April 24, 1924
- Studio: Brunswick Studios, 799 Seventh Avenue, New York City
- Genre: American Dance Music
- Label: Brunswick 2614
- Composer: Isham Jones
- Lyricist: Gus Kahn

Isham Jones Orchestra singles chronology
"Spain" (1924)	"It Had to Be You" (1924)	"Some Other Day, Some Other Girl" (1924)

Audio sample
- Recording of It Had to Be You, performed by Marion Harris and Phil Ohman (1924): file; help

"It Had to Be You" is a popular song composed by Isham Jones, with lyrics by Gus Kahn. It was published on May 9, 1924. by Jerome H. Remick & Co. of New York. The Isham Jones Orchestra recorded an instrumental version of it on April 24, 1924, at Brunswick Studios, 799 Seventh Avenue, New York City, and it was released in July.

A version with lyrics by Gus Kahn and vocal by Marion Harris (who had signed with Brunswick in 1922) and Phil Ohman on piano was recorded for Brunswick in March 1924.

== Other versions ==
A version by Doris Day and the Paul Weston Orchestra appeared on the 1951 I'll See You In My Dreams soundtrack album.

Frank Sinatra together with the Billy May Orchestra recorded a version for Frank Sinatra's 1980 Trilogy: Past Present Future.

== Appearances in film and television ==
- By Ruth Etting in the 1936 short film Melody in May
- By Edward G. Robinson and Harry Seymour with Seymour on piano in the 1938 film A Slight Case of Murder
- By Priscilla Lane in the 1939 film The Roaring Twenties
- In the 1940 Merrie Melodies cartoon, Cross Country Detours, to which a lizard performs a striptease to the song to shed her skin
- By Dooley Wilson in the 1942 film Casablanca
- Daffy Duck performs a striptease to the song in the 1943 Looney Tunes cartoon The Wise Quacking Duck
- By Dick Haymes and Helen Forrest, featured in the R.K.O. Picture Show Business with Victor Young Orchestra
- By Dolores Gray in the 1944 film Mr. Skeffington
- By George Murphy in Show Business (1944)
- Betty Hutton in the 1945 film Incendiary Blonde
- Faye Emerson in the 1945 film Danger Signal
- A parody of Frank Sinatra sings the song in the 1946 Looney Tunes cartoon Book Revue
- By Ginger Rogers and Cornel Wilde in the 1947 film It Had to Be You
- Gene Kelly and Marie McDonald danced to it in the 1947 film Living in a Big Way (while it was being sung by a mixed group)
- In the 1951 film I'll See You in My Dreams (based loosely upon the lives of Gus Kahn and his wife Grace LeBoy Kahn)
- Joanne Dru sang a portion of it in 1955's Hell on Frisco Bay.
- Ray Charles on The Genius of Ray Charles (1959).
- Tina Louise, as Ginger Grant, sang it to Gilligan in the second season Gilligan's Island episode, "Forward March" (1966).
- Diane Keaton in the 1977 film Annie Hall
- Sung by Andrea Marcovicci (and Danny Devito) in the 1982 episode of the TV series Taxi, "Louie's Revenge"
- Peter Riegert and Amy Irving dance to the song in Crossing Delancey (1988).
- Featured in season 4 episode 7 of The Golden Girls, "Sophia's Wedding (Part 2)" (1988)
- As the "theme" of When Harry Met Sally (1989), it finished as #60 in AFI's 100 Years...100 Songs survey of top tunes in American cinema.
- In the 1992 film A League of Their Own by Megan Cavanagh
- Amy Pietz in the third season Caroline in the City episode, "Caroline and the Cold Sesame Noodles" (1997).
- In the 1997 James Bond film Tomorrow Never Dies as an instrumental.
- In the Doctor Who episode "The Empty Child", which aired in 2005
- In season 6 episode 13 of Drop Dead Diva (2014)
- By Greg Davies and Helena Bonham Carter in the first episode of The Cleaner, "The Widow" (2021)
- In the 2024 film Which Brings Me To You, it was performed in the opening sequence by Danielle Nicole, Spencer Hutchings and Davey Nate, and reprised by Spencer Hutchings, Britne Oldford, Lucy Hale and Nat Wolff.

== Bibliography ==
- Who Wrote that Song? Dick Jacobs and Harriet Jacobs, published by Writer's Digest Books, 1993
