= Fifty Roads to Town =

1937 film by Norman Taurog

- Directed by: Norman Taurog
- Written by: William M. Conselman; George Marion Jr.
- Based on: Fifty Roads to Town by Frederick Nebel
- Produced by: Raymond Griffith
- Starring: Don Ameche; Ann Sothern; Slim Summerville
- Cinematography: Joseph H. August
- Edited by: Hanson T. Fritch
- Music by: David Buttolph
- Production company: 20th Century Fox
- Distributed by: 20th Century Fox
- Release date: 4 June 1937
- Running time: 80 minutes
- Country: United States
- Language: English

Fifty Roads to Town is a 1937 American romantic comedy film directed by Norman Taurog and starring Don Ameche and Ann Sothern. The film is based on a book of the same name by author Frederick Nebel. This is the third novel Nebel wrote.

== Plot ==
Two cases of mistaken identity complicate matters when a woman he believes to be a process server comes across a man she believes to be a criminal.

A warrant out on him, Peter Norstrand flees his New York City home and heads north. Hiding out, he is spotted by lodge guest Millicent Kendall, who grips a document when she comes to a room. Peter pulls a gun on her and makes her burn it, unaware that it is actually a marriage license.

Millicent is a missing heiress, planning to elope with her fiancé. Peter forces her to spend the night in his cabin so as not to inform on his whereabouts. When she attempts to escape in the snow, he takes away one of her shoes.

A sheriff and his deputies begin a search for an actual fugitive, Dutch Nelson, and are mistaken for trappers by Peter, who fires a gun to scare them away. The lawmen respond with machine guns and tear gas. Peter reveals to Millicent that the warrant is just to force him to testify in a friend's divorce. As she falls in love with him, the real Dutch turns up.

== Cast ==
- Don Ameche as Peter Nostrand
- Ann Sothern as Millicent Kendall
- Slim Summerville as Ed Henry
- Jane Darwell as Mrs. Henry
- John Qualen as Sheriff Dow
- Douglas Fowley as Dutch Nelson
- Allan Lane as Leroy Smedley
- Alan Dinehart as Jerome Kendall
- Stepin Fetchit as Percy
- Paul Hurst as Tom
- Spencer Charters as George Hession
- DeWitt Jennings as Captain Galloway
- Bradley Page as Pinelli
- Oscar Apfel as Smorgen
- John Hamilton as Captain Carroll
- Russell Hicks as Police Official
- Arthur Aylesworth as Deputy
