= Blue, White and Perfect =

1942 film by Herbert I. Leeds

- Directed by: Herbert I. Leeds
- Written by: Borden Chase; Samuel G. Engel; Brett Halliday
- Produced by: Sol M. Wurtzel
- Starring: Lloyd Nolan; Mary Beth Hughes; Helene Reynolds
- Cinematography: Glen MacWilliams
- Edited by: Alfred Day
- Music by: Cyril J. Mockridge
- Production company: Twentieth Century Fox
- Distributed by: Twentieth Century Fox
- Release date: January 6, 1942
- Running time: 74 minutes
- Country: United States
- Language: English

Blue, White and Perfect is a 1942 American mystery film directed by Herbert I. Leeds and starring Lloyd Nolan, Mary Beth Hughes, and Helene Reynolds. It is part of Twentieth Century Fox's Michael Shayne film series.

The basis of the plot came from Blue, White, and Perfect, a six-part serialized story by Borden Chase that was published in Argosy magazine. The story was subsequently published as Diamonds of Death, a paperback novel.

The film sets were designed by the art directors Lewis Creber and Richard Day.

The film was released for home video as part of the Michael Shayne Mysteries Collection, Vol. 1, DVD set from 20th Century Fox.

== Plot ==
To win back his girlfriend, Merle Garland, private detective Michael Shayne (Lloyd Nolan) promises to abandon his profession and takes a job as a riveter at the Thomas Aircraft plant. Shortly after starting, industrial diamonds worth $100,000 are stolen from the plant's safe. Shayne is drawn into the investigation and, using a series of false identities (including Colonel Henry Breckenridge Lee and Theodore Sherman Jr.), traces the diamonds first to the Daisy Bell Dress Company.

His investigation leads him to board the ocean liner Princess Nolo bound for Honolulu, suspecting the diamonds are being smuggled. On board, Shayne encounters Helen Shaw (alias Connie Ross), an old acquaintance now running a dress shop in Honolulu. He also meets Juan O'Hara, who is secretly an FBI agent. Shayne faces multiple attempts on his life, uncovering a German espionage ring involved in smuggling the diamonds to aid the Axis war effort.

Posing as "William Dodson," Shayne navigates a web of suspects, including the dress company's manager Hagerman (later found murdered) and the ship's steward, Nappy. After a perilous confrontation in a flooding cargo hold with O'Hara, they discover the diamonds ingeniously hidden in candy jars coated with honey and molasses within trunks of dresses. The climax reveals Nappy as the mastermind behind the smuggling operation. Shayne and O'Hara thwart the scheme, recover the diamonds, and Shayne reconciles with Merle.

== Cast ==
- Lloyd Nolan as Michael Shayne
- Mary Beth Hughes as Merle Garland
- Helene Reynolds as Helen Shaw
- George Reeves as Juan Arturo O'Hara
- Steven Geray as Vanderhoefen
- Henry Victor as Rudolf Hagerman
- Curt Bois as Friedrich Gerber, alias Nappy Dubois
- Marie Blake as Ethel
- Emmett Vogan as Charlie
- Mae Marsh as Mrs. Bertha Toby
- Frank Orth as Mr. Toby
- Ivan Lebedeff as Alexis Fournier
- Wade Boteler as Judge
- Charles Trowbridge as Capt. Brown
- Edward Earle as First Officer Richards
- Cliff Clark as Inspector Peterson
- Arthur Loft as Joseph P. McCordy
- Ann Doran as Miss Hoffman
- Charles Williams as Theodore H. Sherman Jr.- Printer

== Production ==
Jonathan Ferguson identifies the film as the first to use the “pew” sound effect for a silenced gun with the sound designer Harry M. Leonard creating the sound by modifying a stock ricochet sound recorded in 1939 for the Twentieth Century Fox sound archive.
