= The Private Practice of Michael Shayne =

1940 novel by Brett Halliday

- First edition
- Author: Brett Halliday
- Language: English
- Genre: Detective
- Publisher: Henry Holt
- Publication date: 1940
- Publication place: United States
- Media type: Print

The Private Practice of Michael Shayne is a 1940 detective novel by the American writer Brett Halliday. It was the second book in Halliday's Michael Shayne series of novels, after Dividend on Death (1939).

== Film adaptation ==
In the same year as its release, the novel was adapted into a film Michael Shayne, Private Detective starring Lloyd Nolan as the private detective hero. It started a film series made by Twentieth Century Fox featuring Nolan.

== Bibliography ==
- Backer, Ron. Mystery Movie Series of 1940s Hollywood. McFarland, 2010.
