= Sleepers West =

1941 film

- Directed by: Eugene Forde
- Written by: Brett Halliday
- Screenplay by: Lou Breslow; Stanley Rauh
- Based on: Sleepers East; 1933 novel by Frederick Nebel
- Produced by: Sol M. Wurtzel
- Starring: Lloyd Nolan; Lynn Bari; Mary Beth Hughes
- Cinematography: J. Peverell Marley
- Edited by: Fred Allen
- Music by: Cyril J. Mockridge
- Production company: Twentieth Century Fox
- Distributed by: Twentieth Century Fox
- Release date: March 14, 1941
- Running time: 74 minutes
- Country: United States
- Language: English

Sleepers West is a 1941 American mystery drama film directed by Eugene Forde and starring Lloyd Nolan, Lynn Bari and Mary Beth Hughes. This second entry in 20th Century-Fox's Michael Shayne series was a remake of the 1934 Fox romantic drama Sleepers East (aka Mystery on the Night Train) from the novel Sleepers East (1933) by Frederick Nebel. The film Michael Shayne - Private Detective (1940) was the first in a series of 12 films. Lloyd Nolan starred as Shayne until the series was dropped by Twentieth Century-Fox and picked up by PRC. In the PRC series, Hugh Beaumont played Shayne.

== Plot ==
On a fateful weekend, private detective Michael Shayne secretly escorts murder-trial witness Helen Carlson by train from Denver to San Francisco. Helen's testimony will free a man falsely accused of murder. His acquittal will also effectively destroy the election chances of a crooked Bay Area politician. By coincidence, Shayne is shadowed by his ex-fiancée, Denver newspaper reporter Kay Bentley. Furthermore, it so happens Kay is not just sniffing out a story. She is travelling with her fiancé, Tom Linscott, an associate of that above-mentioned politician.

Eventually, Kay discovers Tom's duplicitous, self-serving intentions and breaks off her engagement. This clears the way for Kay and Shayne to unite in order to save Helen from harm. At one point, their train is involved in a wreck. This results in Kay, Shayne, Helen, and a runaway husband, Everett Jason, taking a taxicab the rest of the way to San Francisco. During a stopover at a farm, tension mounts between Kay and Shayne when the intrepid girl reporter phones in a story to her editor back in Denver. Shayne angrily reminds Kay that an innocent man's life is at stake, and any publicity of Helen's whereabouts might keep her from testifying. Jason and Helen part, Jason going back home, and Helen continuing with Kay and Mike.

The events at the subsequent trial are given in a montage of newspaper headlines ("Acquitted!"), and the closing scene shows Mike and Kay visiting a diner where Helen is now employed.

== Cast ==
- Lloyd Nolan as Michael Shayne
- Lynn Bari as Kay Bentley
- Mary Beth Hughes as Helen Carlson
- Louis Jean Heydt as Everett Jason
- Edward Brophy as George Trautwein
- Don Costello as Carl Izzard
- Ben Carter as Leander Jones - Porter
- Don Douglas as Tom Linscott
- Oscar O'Shea as Engineer McGowan
- Harry Hayden as Conductor Lyons
- Hamilton MacFadden as Conductor Meyers
- Ferike Boros as Farm Lady

== Production ==
The film was based on the novel Sleepers East which was published in 1933. The New York Times said "though lacking credibility as to plot, the story has full measure of action, suspense and emotional conflict." Film rights were bought by Fox and turned into a 1934 movie.

In October 1940 it was announced that the novel had been bought by Fox as a vehicle for Lynn Bari and would possibly co-star Dean Jagger. Lou Breslow would adapt the script, with filming to start in December. Eugene Ford was to direct.

Fox then announced that the film would be called Sleepers West instead of Sleepers East, and that it would star Bari and Lloyd Nolan instead of Jagger. It was the third time Nolan and Bari co-starred.

In November it was announced the film was being reconfigured as a Michael Shayne movie. It would be the second in the series, following Michael Shayne, Private Detective. Filming started 18 November 1940.

== Reception ==
The Monthly Film Bulletin praised the "polished performances" of the leads, adding that "the direction is brisk, the dialogue amusing, and the settings aboard a train... are realistic." The Los Angeles Times called it "a lively brew".

The New York Times called it "singularly unexciting".
