= Stanley Rauh =

American screenwriter

- Born: March 28, 1898; Dayton, Ohio; United States
- Died: September 12, 1979 (aged 81); Los Angeles, California; United States
- Occupation: Writer
- Years active: 1930 - 1952 (film)

Stanley Rauh (1898–1979) was an American screenwriter.

== Selected filmography ==
- Melody in May (1936)
- Hold That Kiss (1938)
- Pier 13 (1940)
- Sleepers West (1941)
- A-Haunting We Will Go (1942)
- Career Girl (1944)

== Bibliography ==
- Mayer, Geoffrey. Historical Dictionary of Crime Films. Scarecrow Press, 2012.
