= William McCloy =

Australian cricketer

Personal information
- Born: 10 November 1886; Sydney, Australia
- Died: 10 November 1975 (aged 89); Bateman's Bay, New South Wales, Australia
- Source: ESPNcricinfo, 7 January 2017

William McCloy (10 November 1886 – 10 November 1975) was an Australian cricketer. He played five first-class matches for Queensland and New South Wales between 1910/11 and 1918/19.

== See also ==
- List of New South Wales representative cricketers
