= Brett Halliday =

American novelist (1904–1977)

Davis Dresser
- Born: July 31, 1904; Chicago, Illinois, U.S.
- Died: February 4, 1977 (aged 72); Santa Barbara, California, U.S.
- Occupation: Novelist
- Writing career
- Pen name: Brett Halliday, Asa Baker, Mathew Blood, Kathryn Culver, Don Davis, Hal Debrett, Anthony Scott, Anderson Wayne
- Period: 1927–1977
- Genres: Mystery, westerns, romances

Bodies are Where You Find Them (1941), cover

Brett Halliday (July 31, 1904 – February 4, 1977) is the primary pen name of Davis Dresser, an American mystery and western writer. Halliday is best known for the long-lived series of Michael Shayne mysteries he wrote (starting with Dividend on Death in 1939), and later commissioned others to continue. Dresser also wrote westerns, non-series mysteries, and romances under the names Asa Baker, Matthew Blood, Kathryn Culver, Don Davis, Hal Debrett, Anthony Scott, Peter Field, and Anderson Wayne.

== Early life ==
Dresser was born in Chicago, Illinois, but mostly grew up in West Texas. When he was 13 years old a horse threw him into a barbed-wire fence causing the loss of most of the vision in his left eye. Thus, he had to wear an eye patch for the rest of his life.

== Career ==
At the age of 14, he ran away from home and enlisted in the U.S. 5th Cavalry Regiment at Fort Bliss, Texas, followed by a year of Border Patrol duty on the Rio Grande. After his service, he returned to Texas to finish high school. In search of adventure, Dresser traveled throughout the Southwest working at various odd jobs, including that of muleskinner, farm hand, deckhand on a freighter in the Gulf of Mexico, roustabout in the California oilfields, etc. Eventually, he went to Tri-State College of Engineering, where he received a certificate in civil engineering. Back in Texas, he worked as an engineer and surveyor for several years before turning to writing in 1927. He wrote his first mystery story that year while he was an engineer with the Los Angeles County Highway Department.

The first Michael Shayne novel was rejected by 22 publishers before being accepted by Henry Holt & Co. in 1939. The Shayne series went on to be highly successful, reprinted in many editions and translated into French, Spanish, Italian, German, Swedish, Japanese and Hebrew.

From 1953 to 1965, Dresser established Torquil Publishing Company, which published his books as well as those of other authors.

In 1958, Dresser ceased penning the novels published under the name "Brett Halliday", and arranged for ghostwriters, among them Bill Pronzini and Robert Terrell, to continue the series. This was likewise the arrangement for the magazine, and later for the Dell paperback originals.

== Personal life ==
After his first marriage (to Kathleen Rollins, who had two daughters from a previous marriage), Dresser was married to mystery writer Helen McCloy from 1946 to 1961; they had a daughter named Chloe. As partners, they formed a literary agency called Halliday and McCloy. In 1961, he married Mary Savage, also a writer; their son, Halliday, was born in 1965.

Dresser was a founding member of the Mystery Writers of America, and in 1954 he and McCloy were given Edgar Awards for their critical writings on the genre. He also edited several crime story anthologies.crime stories

He died at his home in Montecito at the age of 72. He was survived by his wife Mary, son Halliday and daughter Chloe.

== Adaptations ==
A radio series based on the Shayne character was broadcast during the 1940s.

Twelve motion pictures were made, seven of them featuring Lloyd Nolan as Shayne. Five of the Nolan films, which were produced by 20th Century Fox, have been released on DVD: Michael Shayne, Private Detective; Sleepers West; Dressed to Kill; Blue, White and Perfect and The Man Who Wouldn't Die. After the Fox series ended, five more Shayne films were made by Producers Releasing Corporation which featured Hugh Beaumont as the detective.

There was also a TV series in 1960, starring Richard Denning, as well as a pulp fiction magazine that began as Michael Shayne Mystery Magazine in 1956 and ran for nearly 30 years.

The 2005 film Kiss Kiss Bang Bang is partly based on Halliday's novel Bodies Are Where You Find Them. The 2016 film The Nice Guys, also directed by Shane Black, acknowledged the works of Brett Halliday.

== Novels ==
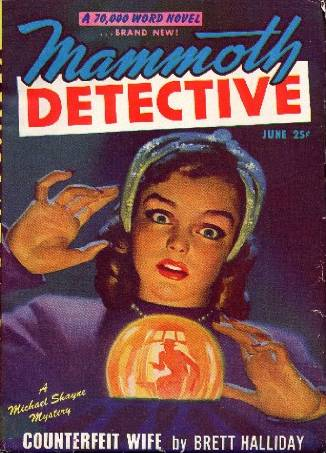
"Counterfeit Wife", a Mike Shayne mystery, as the cover story for Mammoth Detective, June 1947

There is a dispute on how many Halliday novels Dresser wrote himself, and how many were published under his pseudonym, but written by others. Usually it's supposed that he stopped writing completely, or for the most part, after Murder and the Wanton Bride (1958).

Sources:

- Spring Came Too Late (1936) New York: Arcadia House; Davis Dresser and Kathleen Rollins Dresser, writing as Brett Halliday
- Dividend on Death (1939)
- The Private Practice of Michael Shayne (1940)
- The Uncomplaining Corpses (1940)
- Tickets for Death (1941)
- Bodies Are Where You Find Them (1941)
- The Corpse Came Calling (1942)
- Murder Wears a Mummer's Mask (1943; also published as In a Deadly Vein)
- Blood on the Black Market (1943; reprinted as Heads You Lose—Shayne's wife Phyllis was killed off between the previous novel and this one)
- Michael Shayne's Long Chance (1944)
- Dead Man's Diary (1944; also published as A Taste For Cognac)
- Murder and the Married Virgin (1944)
- Murder is My Business (1945)
- Marked for Murder (1945)
- Blood on Biscayne Bay (1946)
- Counterfeit Wife (1947)
- Blood on the Stars (1948)
- A Taste for Violence (1949)
- Before I Wake (1949) New York: Dodd, Mead; Davis Dresser and Kathleen Rollins Dresser writing as Hal DeBrett
- Call for Michael Shayne (1949)
- This is It, Michael Shayne (1950)
- Framed in Blood (1951)
- What Really Happened (1952)
- When Dorinda Dances (1953)
- One Night with Nora (1953)
- She Woke to Darkness (1954)
- A Lonely Way to Die (1954), London: Jarrolds; Davis Dresser and Kathleen Rollins Dresser writing as Hal DeBrett
- Death Has Three Lives (1955)
- Stranger in Town (1955)
- The Blonde Cried Murder (1956)
- Weep for a Blonde (1957)
- Shoot the Works (1957)
- Murder and the Wanton Bride (1958)
- Fit to Kill (1958; first of the ghost-written Shaynes)
- Date with a Dead Man (1959)
- Target: Michael Shayne (1959)
- Die Like a Dog (1959)
- Murder Takes no Holiday (1960)
- Dolls are Deadly (1960)
- The Homicidal Virgin (1960)
- Killers from the Keys (1961)
- Murder in Haste (1961)
- The Careless Corpse (1961)
- Pay-Off in Blood (1962)
- Murder by Proxy (1962)
- Never Kill a Client (1962)
- Too Friendly, Too Dead (1962)
- The Corpse that Never Was (1963)
- The Body Came Back (1963)
- A Redhead for Michael Shayne (1964)
- Shoot to Kill (1964)
- Michael Shayne's 50th Case (1964; the last hardcover Shayne novel, the rest being paperback originals)
- The Violent World of Michael Shayne (1965)
- Nice Fillies Finish Last (1965)
- Murder Spins the Wheel (1966)
- Armed...Dangerous... (1966)
- Mermaid on the Rocks (1967)
- Guilty as Hell (1967)
- So Lush, So Deadly (1968)
- Violence is Golden (1968)
- Lady, Be Bad (1969)
- Six Seconds to Kill (1970)
- Fourth Down to Death (1970)
- Count Backwards to Zero (1971)
- I Come to Kill You (1971)
- Caught Dead (1972)
- Kill All the Young Girls (1973)
- Blue Murder (1973)
- Last Seen Hitchhiking (1974)
- At the Point of a .38 (1974)
- Million Dollar Handle (1976)
- Win Some, Lose Some (1976)

== Films ==
With Lloyd Nolan:

- Michael Shayne, Private Detective (1940)
- Sleepers West (1941)
- Dressed to Kill (1941)
- Blue, White and Perfect (1942)
- The Man Who Wouldn't Die (1942)
- Just Off Broadway (1942)
- Time to Kill (1942)

With Hugh Beaumont:

- Murder Is My Business (1946)
- Larceny in Her Heart (1946)
- Blonde for a Day (1946)
- Three on a Ticket (1947)
- Too Many Winners (1947)

== See also ==
- Bill Pronzini, who also wrote under the Halliday pseudonym.
- Kiss Kiss Bang Bang, a 2005 film directed by Shane Black based on the Shayne novel Bodies Are Where You Find Them.
