= Michael Shayne =

Fictional private detective character

- First appearance: Dividend on Death (1939)
- Last appearance: Win Some, Lose Some (1976)
- Created by: Brett Halliday
- Portrayed by: Lloyd Nolan (film); Hugh Beaumont (film); Jeff Chandler (radio); Wally Maher (radio); Mark Stevens (television pilot); Richard Denning (television)

In-universe information
- Gender: Male
- Occupation: Private detective
- Nationality: American

Michael "Mike" Shayne is a fictional private detective character created during the late 1930s in a series of novels written by writer Brett Halliday, a pseudonym of Davis Dresser. The character appeared in a series of seven films starring Lloyd Nolan for Twentieth Century Fox, five films from the low-budget Producers Releasing Corporation with Hugh Beaumont, a radio series under a variety of titles between 1944 and 1953, a television pilot broadcast in 1958, and later in 1960–1961 in a 32-episode NBC television series starring Richard Denning in the title role.

== Character biography ==
Shayne debuted in the novel Dividend on Death first published in 1939, written by Dresser as Halliday. Fifty Shayne novels were published in hardcover written by Dresser (until 1958) and a variety of ghost-writers. Twenty-seven more were published as paperback originals for a total of seventy-seven. There are also 300 short stories (although many of these are condensed from, or were expanded into, published novels), a dozen films, radio programs and television shows, and a few comic book appearances that included the character.

Shayne was initially married in the novels, his wife being Phyllis (Brighton) Shayne, who was a somewhat limited character, and was often out of town. Dresser "killed her off" when he sold the movie rights to the series. In the book Blood on the Black Market, the comedy aspect of the earlier novels disappears and Shayne is forced to deal with his wife's death. Other recurring characters in the stories are reporter Tim Rourke, Miami Police Chief Will Gentry ( a close friend of Shayne's), Miami Beach Chief of Detectives Peter Painter (a foe of Shayne's), and Shayne's secretary (and occasional romantic interest) Lucy Hamilton. However, later after Dresser stopped writing the novels, Lucy's character simply disappears. For awhile there is mention of an unnamed "secretary." After Lucy, there is no ongoing romantic interest.

Contrary to some other accounts, Shayne actually collects hefty fees and there is no evidence that he has any financial difficulties. He actually maintains an apartment and a separate office in a hotel. He turns down most divorce work and is actually somewhat selective in the cases he picks. He is occasionally surprised, like most fictional detectives, and is hit on the head and knocked out but for the most part he is pictured as having a large frame and well over 6 feet tall and able to handle himself in a fight.

His main friend is reporter Tim Rourke, a full-time newspaper writer whose role increases in later novels. Shayne relies frequently on Rourke for background information on clients or suspects.

He appears to have an excellent reputation in the Miami Beach, Fl area and in some large cities such as New York and New Orleans. Some of the earlier novels take place in New Orleans where Shayne has an office for a time. It is there that he meets Lucy. He hires her and she follows him back to Miami.

== Magazine ==
Dresser later created Mike Shayne Mystery Magazine, first introduced in 1956 by Renown Publications under the title Michael Shayne Mystery Magazine. The magazine continued for nearly three decades, always including at least one Shayne novella in each edition. By this time, "Brett Halliday" was simply a house name. For several years the magazine was edited by Frank Belknap Long.

== Films ==
The 1940 film Michael Shayne, Private Detective is the first in a series of twelve movies. Lloyd Nolan starred as Shayne through 1942, until the series was dropped by Twentieth Century Fox and picked up by PRC.

At that point, Hugh Beaumont took over the role in five films released in 1946. Then, over a half-century later, in 2005, Shane Black directed Kiss Kiss Bang Bang, starring Robert Downey Jr. and Val Kilmer. It was based, in part, on the Shayne novel Bodies Are Where You Find Them, but does not feature Shayne as a character.

=== Twentieth Century Fox films with Lloyd Nolan ===
- Michael Shayne, Private Detective (1940; based on Halliday's novel The Private Practice of Michael Shayne)
- Sleepers West (1941; based on the novel Sleepers East by Frederick Nebel)
- Dressed to Kill (1941; based on the novel The Dead Take No Bows by Richard Burke)
- Blue, White and Perfect (1942; plot from the serial story Blue, White, and Perfect by Borden Chase)
- The Man Who Wouldn't Die (1942; based on the novel No Coffin for the Corpse by Clayton Rawson)
- Just Off Broadway (1942; original screenplay)
- Time to Kill (1942; based on the novel The High Window by Raymond Chandler)

=== PRC films with Hugh Beaumont ===
- Murder Is My Business (1946)
- Larceny in Her Heart (1946)
- Blonde for a Day (1946)
- Three on a Ticket (1947)
- Too Many Winners (1947)

== Radio ==
Jeff Chandler and Wally Maher were among the actors who starred as Shayne in three weekly radio series.

== Television ==
Michael Shayne
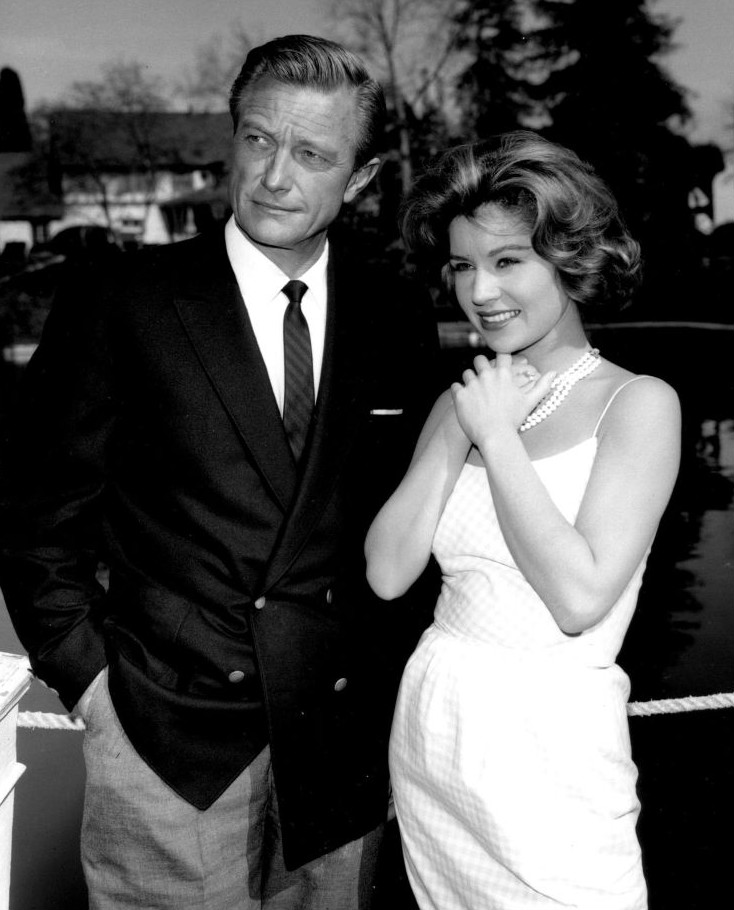
- Denning as Shayne with guest star Pat Crowley.
- Genre: Detective fiction
- Starring: Richard Denning; Herbert Rudley; Jerry Paris; Patricia Donahue; Gary Clarke; Margie Regan; William Kendis
- Composer: Leith Stevens
- Country of origin: United States
- Original language: English
- No. of seasons: 1
- No. of episodes: 32

Production
- Producers: Antony Ellis; Joseph Hoffman
- Running time: 60 min
- Production company: Four Star Productions

Original release
- Network: NBC
- Release: September 30, 1960 – May 19, 1961

In 1958, a failed 30-minute pilot titled "Three Men on a Raft" with Mark Stevens playing Michael Shayne and Merry Anders as Lucy Hamilton was aired on the NBC anthology series Decision. Then, in 1960, the 32-episode television series Michael Shayne began on NBC, with Richard Denning, formerly of the series Mr. and Mrs. North, in the title role. Patricia Donahue originated the role of Lucy Hamilton, Shayne's secretary, but was later replaced by Margie Regan as Lucy Carr after more than half of the episodes had been filmed. William Kendis played as Emmett Hughes. Herbert Rudley played Lieutenant Will Gentry of the Miami Police Department, and Jerry Paris played reporter Tim Rourke of the fictitious Miami Tribune. Gary Clarke, later of The Virginian, played Dick Hamilton, Lucy's younger brother, a character who does not appear in Halliday's books.

William Link and Richard Levinson wrote a number of episodes of the series, including "This Is It, Michael Shayne", which was based on Halliday's novel of that name. Julie Adams, who had previously worked with Richard Denning in Creature from the Black Lagoon, guest starred in this episode. Richard Arlen guest starred as Vincent Rinker in the 1961 episode, "Murder Is a Fine Art."

Beverly Garland appeared in "Murder and the Wanton Bride". She and Denning had previously starred in the 1957 Roger Corman feature film, Naked Paradise. Garland and Denning later costarred with Vincent Price in "The House of the Seven Gables" segment of the film Twice-Told Tales (1963). Warren Oates, Joan Marshall, and David White guest starred in the episode "Murder Round My Wrist." Margie Regan played a nurse in this episode, while Patricia Donahue was still playing Lucy Hamilton. On December 2, 1960, Robert Knapp portrayed Arthur Hudson in the episode "Blood on Biscayne Bay".

The hour-long series ran at 10 p.m. Fridays, opposite CBS's The Twilight Zone with Rod Serling and ABC's The Detectives with Robert Taylor and The Law and Mr. Jones, starring James Whitmore, Conlan Carter, and Janet De Gore.

=== Episodes ===
No.	Title	Directed by	Written by	Original release date
0 (Pilot)	"Three Men on a Raft"	Charles Van Enger	Steve Fisher	28 September 1958
1	"Dolls Are Deadly"	Paul Stewart	Robert J. Shaw	30 September 1960
2	"Night with Nora"	Paul Stewart	*	7 October 1960
3	"Die Like a Dog"	*	Leslie Edgley (as Robert Bloomfield)	14 October 1960
4	"Framed in Blood"	Gerald Mayer	Don Brinkley	28 October 1960
Reporter Ned Brooks has been murdered, and the evidence points to Tim Rourke – at least, politician Jim Gardena is doing his best to pin the rap on him.
5	"Call for Michael Shayne"	Robert Florey	Alfred Terego	4 November 1960
Mike is hired to investigate a suspicious death that the police have already ruled as accidental. When his activities threaten the election campaign of a would-be state attorney, the career of a prominent doctor and the insurance investigator who approved the claim for payment, he is slugged, drugged and framed for murder.
6	"Shoot the Works"	Gerald Mayer	Richard Levinson, William Link	11 November 1960
Lucy asks Mike to investigate the murder of her friend's husband; an apparently loving spouse, he been discovered with his bags packed, two airplane tickets for Paris in his pocket and a love letter lying by his body. Mike learns that $100,000 in negotiable bonds are missing from the office safe and the dead man's partners have a motive for murder.
7	"The Poison Pen Club"	Paul Stewart	*	18 November 1960
8	"This Is It, Michael Shayne"	Robert Florey	Brett Halliday, Richard Levinson, William Link	25 November 1960
Shayne regrets taking a day off to go fishing when he learns that a would-be client, a hard-charging investigative reporter, who had urgently begged for his assistance, was murdered before he could contact her. Taking the case personally, he ignores proper procedure and begins his own investigation into her murder and learns that a gambling racketeer, her estranged husband and a man accusing her of blackmail all had reason to kill her. This was actually the series' pilot episode.
9	"Blood on Biscayne Bay"	Paul Stewart	Ted Leighton	2 December 1960
Shayne is hired to sell a valuable pearl necklace quickly and use the proceeds to pay off a gambling debt. When Shayne opts to pressure the gambling club owner into turning the IOU over to him for free, he is surprised when his client reacts angrily. Mike learns that the gambling debt was only a ruse. His pretty client is up to her eyeballs in blackmail and murder with suspects that include her brother-in-law, the casino lawyer, a former boyfriend and a sleazy divorce attorney.
10	"Murder Plays Charades"	Paul Stewart	Don Ingalls	9 December 1960
Mike is hired to investigate the murder of Voltane, a magician appearing at a charity event. He soon discovers that the magician and his lovely assistant, Kara, were married and simultaneously engaged in extra-marital affairs. His list of suspects expands to the men and women trysting with the show people, the jealous boyfriend and girlfriend of those who were running around with Voltane and his wife and a former magician with whom Voltane had once carried on a torrid affair.
11	"Murder and the Wanton Bride"	Gerald Mayer	William F. Leicester	16 December 1960
A man is found murdered in an alley. The only clue to his identity is a note scrawled inside a matchbook cover regarding an appointment with Mike at 9 a.m. on the following day. Since Mike had no such appointment, and never makes them so early in the morning, he's intensely interested in discovering who killed his would-be client and why the dead man thought he had arranged for a meeting. When the misaddressed letter – complete with substantial retainer – arrives requesting the aforementioned appointment, Mike decides to take the dead man on as a client.
12	"Death Selects the Winner"	Gerald Mayer	Don Brinkley	23 December 1960
A publicist tries to hire Mike to serve as the bodyguard for one of the two favorites in a high-stakes beauty contest, but he refuses the offer. When the other favorite is found murdered in her dressing room, Mike agrees to represent her benefactor, an ex-mobster who swears he's gone straight. Mike must sort out the clues that point to several possible suspects – including other contestants, a businessman on the verge of bankruptcy and a sleazy bodyguard who might have double-crossed his employer.
13	"Murder in Wonderland"	Paul Stewart	Richard Levinson, William Link	30 December 1960
An accountant working for a notorious racketeer is murdered while talking to Mike Shayne on the phone. Police believe that the man was carrying a list of all of the racketeer's business contacts, but the only thing the man had in his locked briefcase was a copy of Alice in Wonderland. Although Captain Gentry finds no evidence that the list was hidden between the book's pages, a thug kidnaps Shayne's secretary and orders Mike to steal the novel from the police or else the pretty blonde will be killed.
14	"The Man with a Cane"	*	*	6 January 1961
Lou Stephano is a former gangster with a long checkered past and lots of enemies. When someone tries to kill him he asks Mike Shayne for help.
15	"Spotlight on a Corpse"	Sidney Salkow	Palmer Thompson	13 January 1961
When a movie producer is found murdered on his set, Shayne is hired by the man financing the film to assist the police in the investigation. Shayne discovers that the actresses working on the film hated the dead man because of his lecherous ways, and a has-been director resented the way his role in the production was reduced to that of a voice coach.
16	"Murder ’Round My Wrist"	Walter Doniger	Sol Stein, Glenn P. Wolfe	20 January 1961
While recovering from an embarrassing injury – being shot in his rear end with a spear gun – Shayne becomes involved in a wrongful death investigation when his internist is accused of an incorrect diagnosis; he treated a wealthy investment broker for insulin shock when the man wasn't a diabetic. The detective discovers that many people would have reason to want the man's death to look like a misdiagnosis – his estranged wife, his embezzling business partner, his pretty young lover who wanted to end their relationship and the lover's brother who would lose the source of his income if his sister had married the dead man.
17	"The Badge"	Paul Stewart	Richard Levinson, William Link	27 January 1961
A police sergeant who believed he was about to crack a major case was gunned down in a rundown section of Miami. Before he died, he pinned his badge on the symbol of the Ravens, one of juvenile gangs operating in the area. Will Gentry is sure that one of their members killed the police officer, but the gang members ask Mike Shayne to find the real killer before the city shuts down the rehabilitation center operating in their neighborhood.
18	"The Heiress"	Sidney Salkow	Laurence Heath	3 February 1961
A pretty young woman (Susan Oliver) hires Shayne look into the background of a man romancing the girl's wealthy mother. Shayne discovers that the paramour, though separated, has never been legally divorced from his previous spouse. Before he can reveal this information, the gold-digger is found murdered on the wealthy woman's estate and the police accuse the maid (Celia Lovsky), a survivor of a German concentration camp, of the crime.
19	"Final Settlement"	Paul Stewart	Don Brinkley	10 February 1961
When Trina DeWitt, a best-selling novelist, informs her ne'er-do-well husband that she has filed for a divorce, her spouse reacts violently. In the ensuing struggle the man falls on the ice pick that he'd twisted from his wife's hand. When the police arrive at the scene of the accident, they find no evidence of a body, or even a struggle, and are also not inclined to believe her story that someone has broken into her wall safe and stolen all her negotiable bonds and jewelry.
20	"Four Lethal Ladies"	Sidney Salkow	William F. Leicester, Richard Levinson, William Link	17 February 1961
Marty Maxwell, a wealthy but unhappily single tycoon, decides to marry one of his four ex-wives and invites the women to a party to get reacquainted. He also invites Mike Shayne to the party, telling him that he has evidence that one of the women wishes to kill him. When Maxwell, as a practical joke, pretends to be poisoned, Shayne storms out of his apartment, but wishes he had stayed when he learns that his former client had, in fact, been murdered later in the evening. First appearance of Margie Regan as secretary Lucy Carr.
21	"The Ancient Art of Murder"	Robert B. Sinclair	*	24 February 1961
Dr. Manx is an archaeologist and expert in Egyptian artifacts. A prize statuette that was in his possession has just been stolen and replaced with a valueless replica.
22	"Murder at the Convention"	Sidney Salkow	John McGreevey	3 March 1961
When a sleazy detective is killed at a private investigator's convention in Miami, there is little regret shown among the two hundred attendees. Nevertheless, the private eyes quickly embark on their own murder investigations, much to the disgust of Lt. Will Gentry and the local police force.
23	"Strike Out"	*	*	10 March 1961
Shayne investigates the death by sleeping pills of Danny Blake, a former baseball star crippled in an accident, and uncovers a clandestine affair between Danny's wife Carol and his brother Marty, as well as an embezzlement. Los Angeles Dodgers announcer Vin Scully and pitchers Sandy Koufax, Ed Roebuck, Larry Sherry and Stan Williams appear as themselves.
24	"Murder Is a Fine Art"	Sidney Salkow	John McGreevey	17 March 1961
Bohemian painter Adam Quick refuses Mike and Tim's offer to pay his fine for slugging a sleazy art dealer, preferring to get his day in court. Tim uses his connections to introduce Adam's work to an influential art collector, but his efforts are again scuttled by the art dealer. When the art dealer is found murdered with Adam lying unconscious over the body, the police arrest the painter for the crime. Mike agrees to take the case and discovers a number of other people who wanted to see the art dealer dead.
25	"The Body Beautiful"	Otto Lang	Leonard Haideman	24 March 1961
Shayne is hired by a doctor who was beaten by two thugs. The victim believes he was roughed up because of his friendship with a bodybuilder nicknamed "Hercules" who plans to bow out as the front man of a franchise of weightlifting gymnasiums. Hercules has fallen in love with the doctor's wild sister and when both the physician and bride are found murdered, the muscle man becomes the prime suspect.
26	"'Marriage Can Be Fatal"	Walter Doniger	Don Brinkley	31 March 1961
Vinnie Pico tries to hire Mike to break up his kid sister's wedding with a unscrupulous playboy, even offering him a blank check for his fee. When Shayne refuses, Vinnie knocks the private detective out. When the playboy is found murdered, Mike is hired to assist in the investigation and discovers that the glass to family's gun case was broken with a high-heeled shoe.
27	"The Boat Caper"	Robert B. Sinclair	Howard Dimsdale	7 April 1961
Arnold Wills is actually happy when his hated business partner is killed by an explosion outside a marina, so it comes as no surprise to any of his friends when the police arrest him for murder. The stubborn defendant refuses Mike's assistance, but the detective investigates anyway and discovers plenty of circumstantial evidence that points to his friend's guilt and plenty of other people who had reasons for wanting the murdered man dead.
28	"Date with Death"	Otto Lang	Laurence Heath	14 April 1961
A wino comes to Mike Shayne with a wild story about two thugs beating and abducting a man who was standing next to him on the waterfront. Mike believe the old man's story, but the police are skeptical until attempts are made on the alcoholic's life and evidence is found that the missing man was connected to a gunrunning deal that went bad.
29	"The Trouble with Ernie"	Robert Butler	Stanford Whitmore	21 April 1961
When the wrong performer is murdered in the locker room of a swimming arena, the police attempt to learn who would want to kill the intended victim, a popular war hero turned entertainer. The hero is reluctant to accept police protection, but agrees to hire Mike Shayne to help the police run down possible leads. Shayne discovers that the killer was a gunman hired by an unexpected source.
30	"No Shroud for Shayne"	Walter Doniger	Don Brinkley	5 May 1961
Mike returns from a three-day fishing trip and discovers that he was reported to have died in a plane crash. Mike decides to remain "dead" so he can investigate the man who impersonated him, and becomes involved with another impostor, flamenco dancers, mob hit men and an informer who wants to turn state's evidence.
31	"It Takes a Heap o’ Dyin’"	Otto Lang	Don Brinkley	12 May 1961
The Palmers, a recently married couple, buy a mansion for back taxes and soon find themselves beset by strange neighbors, intruders and mysterious bumps in the night. When a large trunk left in the basement by the previous owner – an accused murderer – is found vandalized, Fred Palmer hires Mike Shayne to investigate. Mike tries to learn if the mysterious goings-on have anything to do with the disappearance of the beautiful woman whose portrait hangs over the fireplace.
32	"Dead Air"	Sidney Salkow	William Link and Richard Levinson	19 May 1961
Lucy's friend Pat comes to Michael for help, certain that a popular but personally dislikable TV ventriloquist is going to kill her husband, whom Pat has become romantically involved with.

* Unknown

== Comics ==
Dell Comics picked up the character for a comic book series (three issues), Mike Shayne – Private Eye.
