= Lloyd Nolan =

American actor (1902–1985)

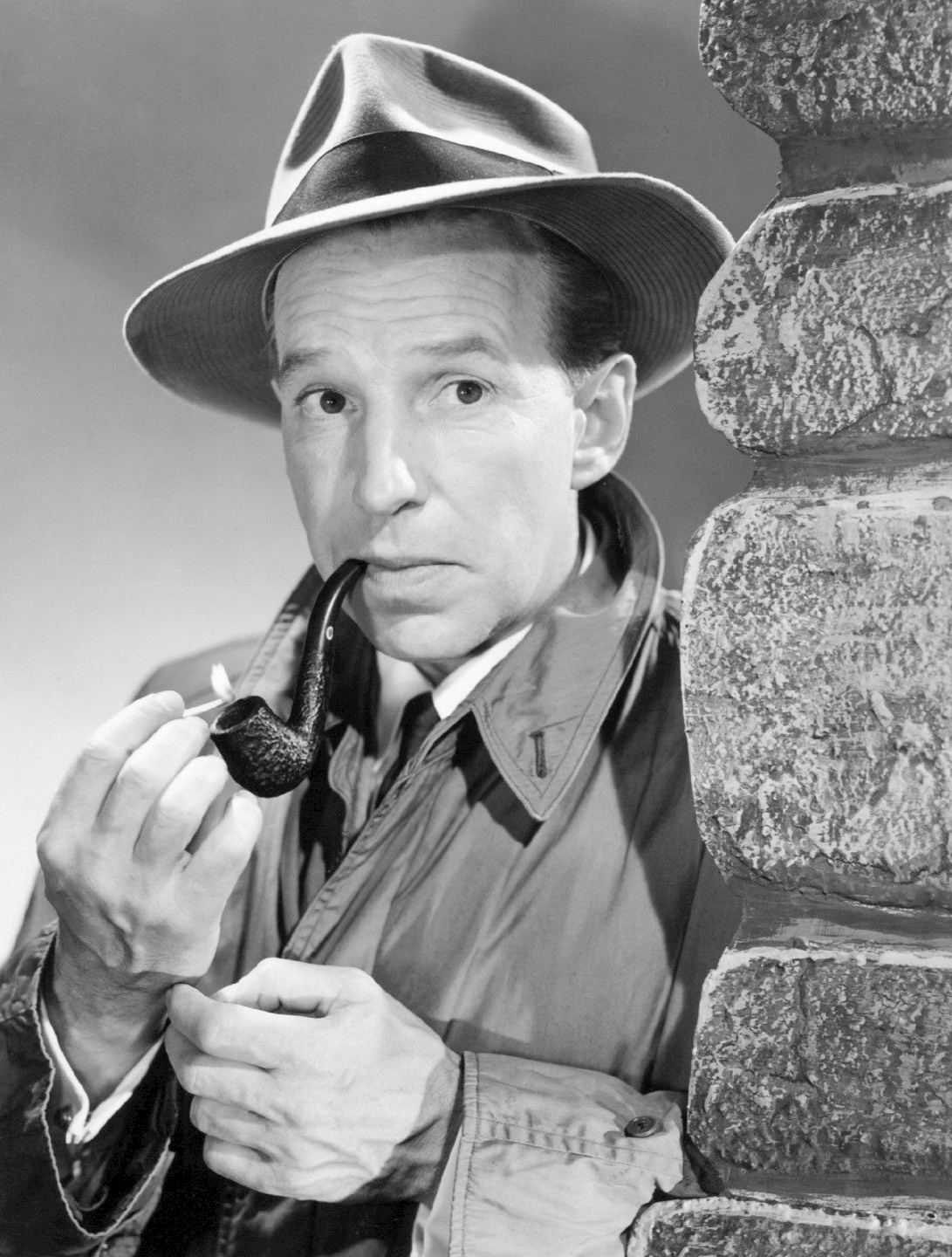
- Nolan as Martin Kane, c. 1951
- Born: Lloyd Benedict Nolan; August 11, 1902; San Francisco, California, US
- Died: September 27, 1985 (aged 83); Los Angeles, California
- Occupation: Actor
- Years active: 1929–1985
- Spouses: Mell Efrid (m. 1933; died 1981) Virginia Dabney (m. 1983)
- Children: 2

Lloyd Benedict Nolan (August 11, 1902 – September 27, 1985) was an American stage, film and television actor who rose from a supporting player and B-movie lead early in his career to featured player status after creating the role of Captain Queeg in Herman Wouk's play The Caine Mutiny Court-Martial in the mid-1950s. Nolan won a Best Actor Emmy Award reprising the part in 1955 TV play based on Wouk's tale of military justice. Additionally, he starred in the Mike Shayne detective films, and the groundbreaking sitcom Julia starring Diahann Carroll.

== Film career ==
Nolan's obituary in the Los Angeles Times contained the evaluation, "Nolan was to both critics and audiences the veteran actor who works often and well regardless of his material." Although Nolan's acting was often praised by critics, he was, for the most part, relegated to B pictures. Despite this, Nolan co-starred with a number of well-known actresses, among them Mae West, Dorothy McGuire, and former Metropolitan Opera mezzo-soprano Gladys Swarthout. Under contract to Paramount and 20th Century Fox studios, he essayed starring roles in the late '30s and early-to-mid '40s and appeared as the title character in the Michael Shayne detective series. Raymond Chandler's novel The High Window was adapted from a Philip Marlowe adventure for the seventh film in the Michael Shayne series, Time to Kill (1942); the film was remade five years later as The Brasher Doubloon, truer to Chandler's original story, with George Montgomery as Marlowe.

A number of Nolan's films were light entertainment with an emphasis on action. His most famous include: Atlantic Adventure; costarring Nancy Carroll; Ebb Tide; Wells Fargo; Every Day's a Holiday, starring Mae West; and Bataan starring Robert Taylor.

Nolan also contributed solid and key character parts in numerous other films. In Johnny Apollo (1940) he was a charismatic but finally self-serving and murderous gang boss. In A Tree Grows in Brooklyn, with Dorothy McGuire and James Dunn, he played a lonely beat policeman. In later years he gave a notable performance as a straight talking doctor who ultimately rails against small-town hypocrisy in the 1957 film Peyton Place with Lana Turner. One of his films was a startling revelation to audiences in 1945. The House on 92nd Street was a conflation of several true incidents of attempted sabotage by the Nazi regime (incidents which the FBI was able to thwart during World War II). Many scenes were filmed on location in New York City, unusual at the time, and real employees of the FBI interacted with Nolan throughout the film. Nolan reprised his role as FBI Agent Briggs in the 1948 movie, The Street with No Name.

One of the last of his many military roles was playing an admiral at the start of what proved to be Howard Hughes' favorite film, Ice Station Zebra.

== Television ==
Later in Nolan's career, he returned to the stage and appeared on television to great acclaim in The Caine Mutiny Court-Martial, for which he received a 1955 Emmy award for portraying Captain Queeg, the role made famous by Humphrey Bogart. Nolan also made guest appearances on television shows, including NBC's The Ford Show, Starring Tennessee Ernie Ford, The Bing Crosby Show, a sitcom on ABC and the Emmy-winning NBC anthology series The Barbara Stanwyck Show.

Nolan appeared on Wagon Train in the second season, episode 16, as the title character in "The Hunter Malloy Story", January 21, 1959.

Nolan appeared three times on NBC's Laramie Western series, as sheriff Tully Hatch in the episode "The Star Trail (1959), as outlaw Matt Dyer in the episode "Deadly Is the Night" (1961) and then as former Union Army General George Barton in the episode "War Hero" (1962). On December 8, 1960, Nolan was cast as Dr. Elisha Pittman, in "Knife of Hate" on Dick Powell's Zane Grey Theatre. In the story line, Dr. Pittman removed one of the legs of Jack Hoyt (Robert Harland) after Hoyt sustained a gunshot wound from which infection was developing. Hoyt wants to marry Susan Pittman (Susan Oliver), but her father is at first unyielding on the matter.

Nolan starred in The Outer Limits episode "Soldier" written by Harlan Ellison. He appeared in the NBC Western Bonanza as LaDuke, a New Orleans detective. In 1967, Strother Martin and he guest-starred in the episode "A Mighty Hunter Before the Lord" of NBC's The Road West series, starring Barry Sullivan. Also in 1967, Nolan was a guest star in the popular Western TV series The Virginian, in the episode "The Payment", and in the pilot episode of Mannix.

Nolan co-starred from 1968 to 1971 in the pioneering NBC series Julia, with Diahann Carroll, who was the first African American woman to star in a non-servant role in her own television series.

One of his last appearances was a guest spot as himself in the 1984 episode "Cast in Steele" on the TV detective series Remington Steele.

On February 8, 1960, Nolan received a star on the Hollywood Walk of Fame for his work in the television industry, at 1752 Vine Street.

In his later years, Nolan appeared in commercials for Polident.

== Personal life ==
Nolan married Mell Efrid in 1933. They had a daughter Melinda who gave them two grandchildren, and a son Jay. The couple remained married for 48 years until Efrid's death in 1981. In 1983, Nolan married Virginia Dabney, with whom he remained until his death.

Nolan's son Jay Nolan had autism and was institutionalized at a private institution at age 13. He died at age 26 from choking while eating. When Lloyd Nolan went public in 1972 about his son's autism, it was revealed that Jay was one of the first children in the United States to be diagnosed with the condition. In a 2026 interview for The New York Times, Sylvester Stallone noted that during his time spent in a reform school as a teenager, he once encountered Jay, who attempted to sexually assault him.

In 1973, Nolan testified to Congress urging that autism be recognized as a developmental disability. Nolan is credited with having convinced Ronald Reagan to sign California's bill mandating education be provided to children with autism. Nolan founded the Jay Nolan Autistic Center (now known as Jay Nolan Community Services) in honor of his son, and was chairman of the annual Save Autistic Children Telethon.

In 1964, Nolan spoke at the "Project Prayer" rally attended by 2,500 at the Shrine Auditorium in Los Angeles. The gathering, which was hosted by Anthony Eisley, a star of ABC's Hawaiian Eye series, sought to flood the United States Congress with letters in support of mandatory school prayer, following two decisions in 1962 and 1963 of the United States Supreme Court which struck down mandatory school prayer as conflicting with the Establishment Clause of the First Amendment to the United States Constitution. Joining Nolan and Eisley at the rally were Walter Brennan, Rhonda Fleming, Dale Evans, Pat Boone, and Gloria Swanson. At the rally, Nolan asked, "Do we permit ourselves to be turned into a godless people, or do we preserve America as one nation under God?" Eisley and Fleming added that John Wayne, Ronald Reagan, Roy Rogers, Mary Pickford, Jane Russell, Ginger Rogers, and Pat Buttram would also have attended the rally had their schedules not been in conflict. "Project Prayer" was ultimately unsuccessful in its campaign to keep public prayer in public schools.

A lifelong Republican, Nolan appeared alongside Ronald Reagan during the 1976 New Hampshire presidential primary in which he nearly scored an upset against President Gerald Ford.

Death

A long-time cigar and pipe smoker, Nolan died of lung cancer on September 27, 1985, at his home in Brentwood, California; he was 83. He is interred at the Westwood Village Memorial Park Cemetery in Westwood, Los Angeles, California.

== Filmography ==
=== Film ===
Year	Title	Role	Notes
1935	G Men	Hugh Farrell	
1935	Stolen Harmony	Chesty Burrage	
1935	Atlantic Adventure	Dan Miller	
1935	She Couldn't Take It	Tex	
1935	One Way Ticket	Jerry	
1936	You May Be Next	Neil Bennett	
1936	Lady of Secrets	Michael Harvey	
1936	Big Brown Eyes	Russ Cortig	
1936	Devil's Squadron	Dana Kirk	
1936	Counterfeit	Capper Stevens	
1936	The Texas Rangers	Sam 'Polka Dot' McGee	
1936	15 Maiden Lane	Det. Sgt. Walsh	
1937	Internes Can't Take Money	Hanlon	
1937	King of Gamblers	Jim Adams	
1937	Exclusive	Charles Gillette	
1937	Ebb Tide	Attwater	
1937	Every Day's a Holiday	John Quade	
1937	Wells Fargo	Dal Slade	
1938	Dangerous to Know	Inspector Brandon	
1938	Tip-Off Girls	Bob Anders	
1938	Hunted Men	Joe Albany	
1938	Prison Farm	Larry Harrison	
1938	King of Alcatraz	Raymond Grayson	
1939	Ambush	Tony Andrews	
1939	St. Louis Blues	Dave Geurney	
1939	Undercover Doctor	Robert Anders	
1939	The Magnificent Fraud	Sam Barr	
1940	The Man Who Wouldn't Talk	Joe Monday	
1940	The House Across the Bay	Slant Kolma	
1940	Johnny Apollo	Mickey Dwyer	
1940	Gangs of Chicago	Matthew J. 'Matty' Burns	
1940	The Man I Married	Kenneth Delane	
1940	The Golden Fleecing	Gus Fender	
1940	Pier 13	Danny Dolan	
1940	Charter Pilot	King Morgan	
1940	Michael Shayne, Private Detective	Michael Shayne	
1940	Behind the News	Stuart Woodrow	
1941	Mr. Dynamite	Tommy N. Thornton / Mr. Dynamite	
1941	Sleepers West	Michael Shayne	
1941	Dressed to Kill	Michael Shayne	
1941	Buy Me That Town	Rickey Deane	
1941	Blues in the Night	Del Davis	
1941	Steel Against the Sky	Rocky Evans	
1942	Saboteur	Frank Fry	
1942	Blue, White and Perfect	Michael Shayne	
1942	The Man Who Wouldn't Die	Michael Shayne	
1942	It Happened in Flatbush	Frank 'Butterfingers' Maguire	
1942	Just Off Broadway	Michael Shayne	
1942	Apache Trail	Trigger Bill Folliard	
1942	Manila Calling	Lucky Matthews	
1942	Time to Kill	Michael Shayne	
1943	Bataan	Corp. Barney Todd	
1943	Don't Be a Sucker	Commentator	Short film
1943	Guadalcanal Diary	Sgt. Hook Malone	
1944	Attack! The Battle of New Britain	Narrator (voice)	Documentary
1944	Resisting Enemy Interrogation	USAF Debriefing Officer / Narrator	Uncredited
1945	A Tree Grows in Brooklyn	Officer McShane	
1945	Circumstantial Evidence	Sam Lord	
1945	War Comes to America	Narrator (voice)	Documentary
1945	Captain Eddie	Lt. Jim Whittaker	
1945	The House on 92nd Street	Inspector George A. Briggs	
1946	Somewhere in the Night	Police Lt. Donald Kendall	
1946	Two Smart People	Bob Simms	
1947	Lady in the Lake	Lt. DeGarmot	
1947	Wild Harvest	Kink	
1948	Green Grass of Wyoming	Rob McLaughlin	
1948	The Street with No Name	Inspector George A. Briggs	
1949	The Sun Comes Up	Thomas I. Chandler	
1949	Bad Boy	Marshall Brown	
1949	Easy Living	Lenahan	
1951	The Lemon Drop Kid	Oxford Charlie	
1953	Island in the Sky	Captain Stutz	
1953	Crazylegs	Win Brockmeyer	
1956	The Last Hunt	Woodfoot	
1956	Santiago	Clay Pike	Alternative title: The Gun Runner
1956	Toward the Unknown	Brig. Gen. Bill Banner	Alternative title: Brink of Hell
1957	Seven Waves Away	Frank Kelly	Alternative titles: Abandon Ship; Seven Days From Now
1957	A Hatful of Rain	John Pope Sr.	
1957	Peyton Place	Dr. Matthew Swain	
1960	Portrait in Black	Matthew S. Cabot	
1960	Girl of the Night	Dr. Mitchell	
1961	Susan Slade	Roger Slade	
1962	We Joined the Navy	Vice Admiral Ryan	
1963	The Girl Hunters	Agent Arthur Rickerby	
1964	Circus World	Cap Carson	Alternative title: The Magnificent Showman
1965	Never Too Late	Mayor Crane	
1966	An American Dream	Barney Kelly	Alternative title: See You in Hell, Darling
1967	The Double Man	Edwards	
1968	Sergeant Ryker	Gen. Amos Bailey	
1968	Ice Station Zebra	Admiral Garvey	
1970	Airport	Harry Standish	
1974	Earthquake	Dr. James Vance	
1975	The Sky's the Limit	Cornwall	
1977	The Private Files of J. Edgar Hoover	Harlan F. Stone	
1978	My Boys Are Good Boys	Officer Dan Mountgomery	
1980	Galyon	Willard Morgan	
1985	Prince Jack	Joe Kennedy	
1986	Hannah and Her Sisters	Evan	

=== Television ===
Year	Title	Role	Notes
1950	The Ford Theatre Hour	Nifty Miller	Episode: "The Barker"
1951–1952	Martin Kane, Private Eye	Martin Kane	7 episodes
1952	Ford Television Theatre		Episode: "Protect Her Honor"
1955	Climax!	Jack London	Episode: "Sailor on Horseback"
1955	Ford Star Jubilee	Lt. Cmdr. Philip Francis Queeg	Episode: "The Caine Mutiny Court-Martial"; Primetime Emmy Award for Outstanding Single Performance by an Actor in a Leading Role
1957	Playhouse 90	Capt. Kuyper	Episode: "Galvanized Yankee"
1958–1960	Dick Powell's Zane Grey Theatre	Dr. Elisha Pittman / Adam Larkin	2 episodes
1959	Special Agent 7	Special Agent Philip Conroy	25 episodes
1959	Wagon Train	Hunter Malloy	Episode: "The Hunter Malloy Story"
1959	Ah, Wilderness!	Nat Miller	Television film
1959	Westinghouse Desilu Playhouse	Sheriff Orville Darrow	Episode: "Six Guns for Donegan"
1959	Father Knows Best	Coach Harper	Episode: "Bud Plays It Safe"
1959	The Untouchables	George 'Bugs' Moran	Episode: "The George 'Bugs' Moran Story"
1959–1962	Laramie	General George Barton / Matt Dyer / Sheriff Tully Hatch	3 episodes
1960	Startime	Narrator	Episode: "Crime, Inc."
1960	Bonanza	Inspector Charles Leduque	Episode: "The Stranger"
1960	The Barbara Stanwyck Show	George McShane	Episode: "The Seventh Miracle"
1961	Bus Stop	Stroud	Episode: "The Glass Jungle"
1961	General Electric Theater	Robert Hale / Michael Bowen	2 episodes
1962	Outlaws	Buck Breeson	Episode: "Buck Breeson Rides Again"
1962	The Dick Powell Show	Vernon Clay	Episode: "Special Assignment"
1963	The DuPont Show of the Week	James Feveral	Episode: "Two Faces of Treason"
1963	The Great Adventure	Col. Fraser	2 episodes
1963	77 Sunset Strip	Col. David Watkins	3 episodes
1963	Kraft Suspense Theatre	Gen. Amos Bailey	2 episodes
1963–1967	The Virginian	Tom Foster / Abe Clayton / Wade Anders	3 episodes
1964	The Outer Limits	Tom Kagan	Episode: "Soldier"
1964	Bob Hope Presents the Chrysler Theatre	Dan Sinclair	Episode: "Mr. Biddle's Crime Wave"
1965	Daniel Boone	Ben Hanks	Episode: "The Price of Friendship"
1965	The Bing Crosby Show	Harvey	Episode: "What's a Buddy For?"
1965	Slattery's People	Admiral Wallace Blackburtn	Episode: "Rally Round Your Own Flag, Mister"
1967	The Road West	Jed Daniell	Episode: "A Mighty Hunter Before the Lord"
1967	Wings of Fire	Max Clarity	Television film
1967	Mannix	Sam Dubrio	Episode: "The Name Is Mannix"
1968	The Danny Thomas Hour	Dr. Richmond	Episode: "The Cage"
1968	Judd, for the Defense	D.A. Patrick Bantry	Episode: "The Devil's Surrogate"
1968	I Spy	Manion	Episode: "The Name of the Game"
1968–1971	Julia	Dr. Morton Chegley	86 episodes Nominated—Primetime Emmy Award for Outstanding Lead Actor in a Comedy Series (1969)
1972	Owen Marshall, Counselor at Law	Col. Eldon Rutledge	Episode: "A Question of Degree"
1972	The Bold Ones: The New Doctors	Dr. Karl Richardson	Episode: "A Nation of Human Pincushions"
1973	Isn't It Shocking?	Jesse Chapin	Television film
1973	McCloud	Elroy Jenkins	Episode: "Butch Cassidy Rides Again"
1973	The F.B.I.	Judge Harper	Episode: "The Killing Truth"
1974	The Magician	Charles Keegan	2 episodes
1975	The Wonderful World of Disney	Cornwall	2 episodes
1975	The Abduction of Saint Anne	Carl Gentry	Television film
1975	Lincoln	William H. Seward	Episode: "The Unwilling Warrior"
1976	Ellery Queen	Doctor Sanford	Episode: "The Adventure of the Sunday Punch"
1976	The November Plan	Gen. Smedley Butler	Television film
1976	City of Angels	General Butler	Episode: "The November Plan: Part 1"
1977	McMillan & Wife	Horace Sherwin	Episode: "Affair of the Heart"
1977	Flight to Holocaust	Wilton Bender	Television film
1977	Fire!	Doc Bennett	Television film
1977	Police Woman	Q. Waldo Mims	Episode: "Merry Christmas Waldo"
1977	The Mask of Alexander Cross	Strickland	Television film
1977	Gibbsville		Episode: "The Price of Everything"
1978	The Waltons	Cyrus Guthrie	Episode: "The Return"
1978	Quincy, M.E.	Dr. Herbert Schumann	Episode: "A Test for Living"
1978	The Hardy Boys/Nancy Drew Mysteries	Professor Anton Hendricks	Episode: "Search for Atlantis"
1979	$weepstake$	Dr. Warnecke	"Dewey and Harold and Sarah and Maggie"
1979	Valentine	Brother Joe	Television film
1981	Archie Bunker's Place	Judge Sean McGuire	2 episodes
1982	Adams House	Frank Gallagher	Television film
1984	Remington Steele	Himself	Episode: "Cast in Steele"
1984	It Came Upon the Midnight Clear	Monsignor Donoghue	Television film
1985	Murder, She Wrote	Julian Tenley	Episode: "Murder in the Afternoon"

== Radio appearances ==
Year	Program	Episode/source
1945	Suspense	"Murder for Myra"
1945	Suspense	"Nineteen Deacon Street"
1946	Suspense	"Hunting Trip"
1947	Suspense	"Green-Eyed Monster"
1947	Suspense	"Double Ugly"
1952	Suspense	The Man with Two Faces
1953	Suspense	Vial of Death
