= Frederick Nebel =

American writer (1903 - 1967)

Frederick Lewis Nebel
- Born: November 3, 1903; Staten Island, New York, New York, U.S.
- Died: May 3, 1967 (aged 63); Laguna Beach, California, U.S.
- Occupations: Novelist, short story writer
- Spouse: Dorothy Blank
- Writing career
- Pen name: Grimes Hill, Eric Lewis, Lewis Nebel
- Genres: Crime fiction, Mystery fiction, Romance fiction
- Notable works: Sleepers East (1933), But Not the End (1934), Fifty Roads to Town (1936) Serialized Characters: Jack Cardigan, Donny Donahue, MacBride and Kennedy

Frederick Lewis Nebel (November 3, 1903 - May 3, 1967), was an American writer. Although he published more than 300 stories and three novels, many of which were adapted for film, he is best known today for his hardboiled detective fiction.

Nebel was one of the most important writers for Black Mask, publishing a total of 67 stories in the magazine, second only to Erle Stanley Gardner. He also wrote prolifically for Dime Detective before moving on to more "respectable" work such as his thriller novel Sleepers East, which was made into a film, and magazine writing for Colliers, Cosmopolitan, and Good Housekeeping.

== Early life ==
Born in Staten Island, New York, Nebel dropped out of school at 15 after only one day in high school. He worked as a dockhand and a valet before moving to Canada where he worked as a farmhand on his great-uncle’s homestead. He enjoyed the wilderness and became a self-taught expert in Canadian history. This expertise helped launch his career writing adventure stories for Northwest Stories, beginning in 1925. He returned to New York and got a job working as a brakeman on passenger trains and writing in his spare time.

== Career ==
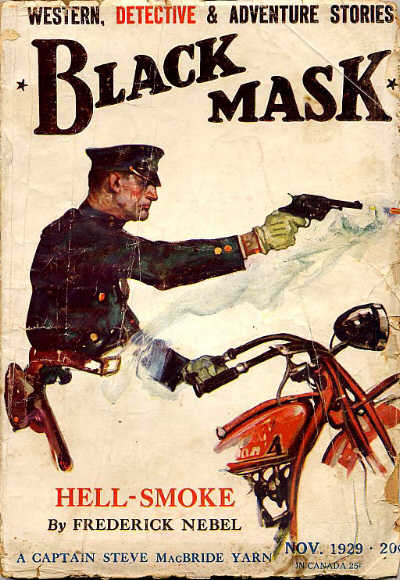
November 1929 issue of Black Mask

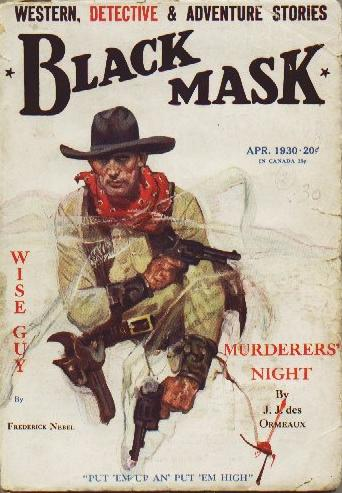
April 1930 issue of Black Mask

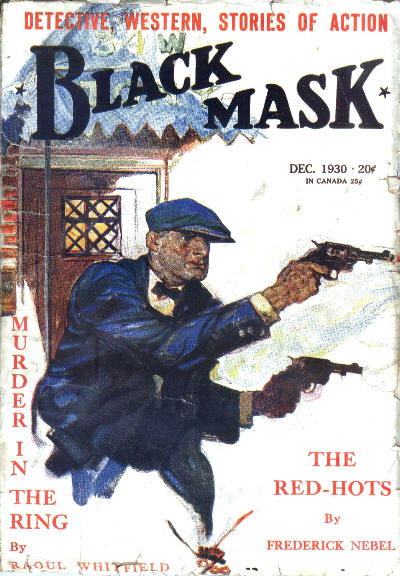
December 1930 issue of Black Mask

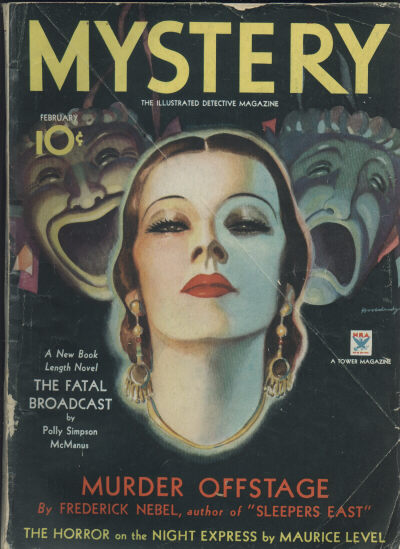
February 1934 issue of Mystery

=== Pulp magazines ===
Nebel was a prolific writer, penning up to 5,000 words a day, often keeping five to six serial heroes in action from week to week for the pulps. In 1926, Nebel sold his first Black Mask story, “The Breaks of the Game,” to editor Phil Cody. That same year Joseph Shaw took over as editor, and throughout his tenure with the magazine, he mentored Nebel as he published his work. Over the next 12 years, Nebel published at a fast pace, writing up to 5000 words a day, while publishing in Black Mask and numerous other pulp magazines, including Action Stories, Danger Trail, Dime Detective and Sea Stories.

Shaw encouraged his authors to develop series characters, and Nebel created the detective duo of Captain Steve MacBride and newspaper reporter Kennedy of fictional “Richmond City”. MacBride was a hardboiled homicide detective while drunken, wisecracking Kennedy provided comic relief. The pair was featured in 36 of Nebel’s stories spanning 8 years.[6] In the 1930s, Nebel sold the rights to MacBride and Kennedy stories to Warner Bros. who made ten film adaptations. The CBS Radio series Meet MacBride, beginning in 1936, was also adapted from the series.

Nebel created Donny “Tough Dick” Donahue at the request of Shaw for a character similar to Dashiel Hammett’s Sam Spade. Following the huge success of The Maltese Falcon, Shaw wanted more Spade stories but Hammett, a personal friend of Nebel’s, had quit the pulps for Hollywood. Donahue was an ex-cop discharged for not giving into corruption, now working for the Inter-State Detective Agency. From 1930 to 1935, Nebel wrote 15 Donahue stories for Black Mask.

From 1931 to 1937, Nebel wrote nearly 50 stories for Dime Detective featuring the character Jack Cardigan, a tough, Irish detective working for the Cosmos Detective Agency in St. Louis.

Other series characters created by Nebel include: Bill Gales and Mike McGill for Air Stories, Brinkhaus for Detective Fiction Weekly, Corporate Chet Tyson for Northwest Stories, and The Driftin’ Kid for Lariat.

Nebel sometimes wrote under the pen names Lewis Nebel, Eric Lewis and Grimes Hill, a name derived from Grymes Hill, near where he was born on Staten Island.

=== Novels and screen adaptations ===
In 1933, Little, Brown published Nebel’s first novel, Sleepers East, based on his early experience as a brakeman on passenger trains. The thriller is set entirely on a ten-hour train ride from the Midwest to New York. The New York Times, while critical of the genre conventions of a story set on a train, praised Nebel for providing "thrills a-plenty." "Though lacking credibility as to plot, the story has full measure of action, suspense and emotional conflict." The novel was later adapted to the screen as Sleepers West (1941). In 1934, he wrote But Not the End, a novel set in Depression-era New York City. The book was praised for its "brilliant divergences from the standardized patterns of depression era fiction. In 1936, he wrote the novel Fifty Roads to Town. The New York Times wrote,"This is a first rate, virile piece of story-telling. It moves dramatically but in a restrained and effective manner toward its ultimate goal." It was adapted into a comedy film of the same name starring Don Ameche in 1937.

His story “The Bribe” was adapted into the 1949 movie by the same name, starring Robert Taylor, Ava Gardner, Charles Laughton, and Vincent Price. On television, his work was adapted for such shows as General Electric Theater and Studio One.

=== Slick magazines ===
After selling the film rights to Sleepers East, Nebel hired agent Carl Brandt. After 12 years and more than 230 stories, Nebel stopped writing for the detective pulps in 1937 to focus on romance. Under Brandt’s guidance, Nebel began selling to higher-paying slick magazines such as Collier's, Cosmopolitan, Good Housekeeping, Liberty, McCall’s, Redbook, The Saturday Evening Post and Woman’s Home Companion.

In 1956 he returned to mystery writing briefly, publishing 6 more short stories for Ellery Queen's Mystery Magazine. His last story was published in 1962.

== Personal life ==
Nebel met his wife, Dorothy Blank, in Paris in 1928. They married in 1930 and moved to St. Louis, where much of his fiction is set. In 1934, they moved to Connecticut and in 1937 they had a son, Christopher Nebel. Suffering from high blood pressure, Nebel moved to Laguna Beach, California in the late 1950s. In 1967 Nebel suffered a cerebral hemorrhage and died three days later at age sixty-three.
