= Grandon Rhodes =

American actor (1904–1987)

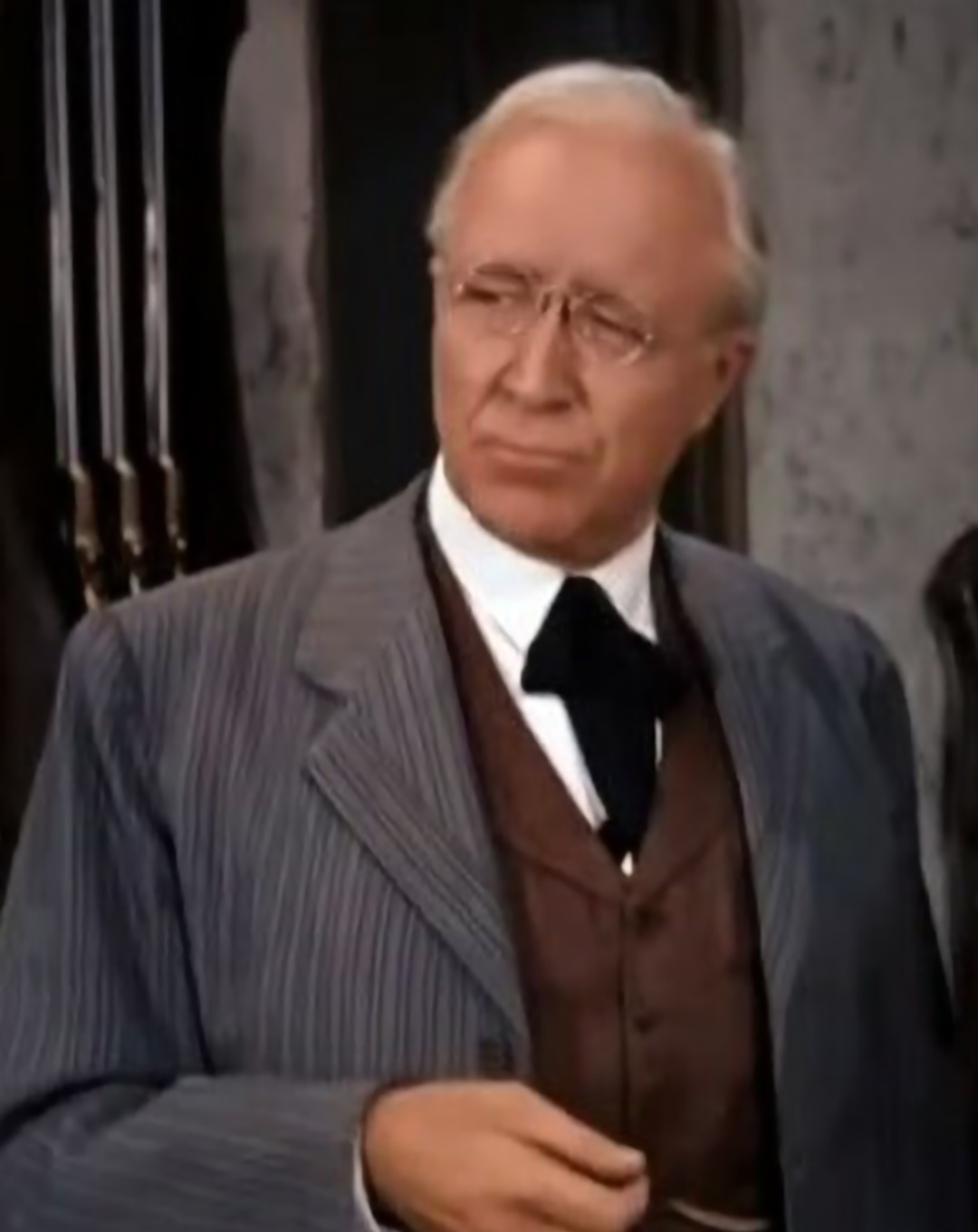
- Rhodes in the TV-series Bonanza, episode Dark Star (1960)
- Born: Grandon Neviers Augustine Rolker; August 7, 1904; Jersey City, New Jersey, U.S.
- Died: June 9, 1987 (aged 82); Encino, California, U.S.
- Occupation: Actor
- Years active: 1942–1965
- Spouse: Ruth Lee

Grandon Rhodes (born Grandon Neviers Augustine Rolker; August 7, 1904 – June 9, 1987) was an American actor.

== Early years ==
Rhodes was born in Jersey City, New Jersey.

== Career ==
Early in his career, Rhodes acted in repertory theatre with troupes in Montreal, Oklahoma City, Omaha, and Hartford, among other places. His film debut came in Follow the Boys (1944).

In addition to numerous film appearances, he was also a regular in two long-running television shows, playing the doctor in Bonanza and a judge in Perry Mason. He also appeared in a recurring role as Beverly Hills banker Chester Vanderlip throughout most of the run of The George Burns and Gracie Allen Show. Rhodes acted in repertory theatre in Hartford, Montreal, Oklahoma City, and Omaha. In January 1932, he became the leading man of the Auditorium Permanent Players in Rochester, New York. Rhodes's Broadway credits included A Boy Who Lived Twice (1945), The Deep Mrs. Sykes (1945), Flight to the West (1940), Abe Lincoln in Illinois (1938), Ceiling Zero (1935), Lost Horizons (1934), and Antony and Cleopatra (1924).

== Personal life and death ==
Rhodes was married to actress Ruth Lee. He died at age 82 in Encino, California.

== Selected filmography ==
- Ship Ahoy (1942) - Lieutenant Commander Thurston (uncredited)
- Shadow of a Doubt (1943) - Reverend MacCurdy (uncredited)
- Hit Parade of 1943 (1943) - Escort (uncredited)
- Action in the North Atlantic (1943) - Lieutenant Commander (uncredited)
- Corvette K-225 (1943) - Lieutenant (uncredited)
- The Impostor (1944) - Captain
- Ladies Courageous (1944) - Briefing Officer (uncredited)
- The Fighting Sullivans (1944) - Naval Doctor (uncredited)
- Lady in the Dark (1944) - Reporter (uncredited)
- Follow the Boys (1944) - George Grayson (uncredited)
- Sensations of 1945 (1944) - Doctor (uncredited)
- Raiders of Ghost City (1944, Serial) - Major Bell (Ch's 1 & 9) (uncredited)
- Wilson (1944) - White House Reporter (uncredited)
- The Doughgirls (1944) - First Hotel Clerk (uncredited)
- Our Hearts Were Young and Gay (1944) - Clerk (uncredited)
- Practically Yours (1944) - Mac (uncredited)
- Roughly Speaking (1945) - Jewelry Salesman (uncredited)
- Hollywood and Vine (1945) - Attorney Wilson - replaced by Charles Middleton (scenes deleted)
- Nob Hill (1945) - Devereaux (uncredited)
- Magnificent Doll (1946) - Thomas Jefferson
- Born to Kill (1947) - Inspector Wilson
- Too Many Winners (1947) - John Hardeman
- Ride the Pink Horse (1947) - Mr. Edison
- Song of Love (1947) - Reinecke's Companion (uncredited)
- High Wall (1947) - Dr. Ederman (uncredited)
- Song of My Heart (1948) - Doctor
- Big Town Scandal (1948) - Judge Hogan (uncredited)
- Walk a Crooked Mile (1948) - Adolph Mizner (uncredited)
- Larceny (1948) - Harry Carson (uncredited)
- The Gentleman from Nowhere (1948) - Edward Dixon
- Road House (1948) - Judge
- Blondie's Secret (1948) - Ken Marcy
- Trouble Preferred (1948) - Ed Larson (uncredited)
- Miss Mink of 1949 (1949) - Nietsche a.k.a. Imhoff Schultz
- The Clay Pigeon (1949) - Naval Intelligence Agent Clark
- Tucson (1949) - Dean Sherman
- Streets of Laredo (1949) - Phil Jessup
- Canadian Pacific (1949) - Dr. Mason
- It Happens Every Spring (1949) - Professor (uncredited)
- White Heat (1949) - Dr. Harris (uncredited)
- All the King's Men (1949) - Floyd McEvoy
- Tell It to the Judge (1949) - Ken Craig
- And Baby Makes Three (1949) - Phelps Burbridge, Lawyer (uncredited)
- Dancing in the Dark (1949) - Producer (uncredited)
- The Lady Takes a Sailor (1949) - Dr. Newman (uncredited)
- Life of St. Paul Series (1949) - Luke
- Women from Headquarters (1950) - Richard Cott
- The Eagle and the Hawk (1950) - Governor Francis Lubbock
- The Lost Volcano (1950) - Dr. Charles Langley
- Wyoming Mail (1950) - Senator Dowell (uncredited)
- Tripoli (1950) - Commander Barron
- The Second Face (1950) - Floyd Moran
- The Du Pont Story (1950) - President Thomas Jefferson
- The Flying Missile (1950) - Captain Whitaker (uncredited)
- Born Yesterday (1950) - Sanborn
- Storm Warning (1951) - Pike (uncredited)
- Take Care of My Little Girl (1951) - Professor H. Benson (uncredited)
- Force of Arms (1951) - Army Doctor (uncredited)
- The Guy Who Came Back (1951) - Captain Shallock (uncredited)
- Criminal Lawyer (1951) - Judge J. Larrabee (uncredited)
- Detective Story (1951) - Detective O'Brien
- Come Fill the Cup (1951) - Dr. Ross (uncredited)
- The Golden Horde (1951) - Emir (uncredited)
- Elopement (1951) - Minor Role (uncredited)
- Indian Uprising (1952) - Thatcher, Arizona Territorial Delegate (uncredited)
- Boots Malone (1952) - Drunk at Horse Auction (uncredited)
- The Sniper (1952) - Warren Fitzpatrick (uncredited)
- Cripple Creek (1952) - W.S. Drummond, Secret Service Chief (uncredited)
- As the Twig is Bent (1952) (a Lutheran Television Production)
- Angel Face (1953) - Prison Chaplain (uncredited)
- On Top of Old Smoky (1953) - Doc Judson
- House of Wax (1953) - Surgeon (uncredited)
- The System (1953) - District Attorney Dunlop (uncredited)
- A Blueprint for Murder (1953) - Probate Judge James J. Adams (uncredited)
- So Big (1953) - Bainbridge (uncredited)
- Three Sailors and a Girl (1953) - George Abbott (uncredited)
- Bad for Each Other (1953) - Dr. Walter Messenger (uncredited)
- Secret of the Incas (1954) - Mr. Winston (uncredited)
- Them! (1954) - Alcoholic Ward Doctor (uncredited)
- Human Desire (1954) - John Owens
- A Star Is Born (1954) - Producer at Premiere (uncredited)
- Revenge of the Creature (1955) - Jackson Foster
- The Eternal Sea (1955) - Admiral at CIMPAC Meeting (uncredited)
- Headline Hunters (1955) - Magistrate (uncredited)
- The McConnell Story (1955) - Major at Hearing (uncredited)
- Illegal (1955) - John Seltzer (uncredited)
- Trial (1955) - Professor Terry Bliss (uncredited)
- A Man Alone (1955) - Luke Joiner
- Texas Lady (1955) - Nickerson (uncredited)
- Miracle in the Rain (1956) - Mr. Baldwin, City Editor (uncredited)
- Earth vs. the Flying Saucers (1956) - General Edmunds
- These Wilder Years (1956) - Roy Oliphant
- Tension at Table Rock (1956) - Judge (uncredited)
- The Rack (1956) - General (uncredited)
- The 27th Day (1957) - UN Presiding Officer (uncredited)
- The Wayward Girl (1957) - District Attorney Nevins
- Jailhouse Rock (1957) - Professor August van Alden (uncredited)
- The Notorious Mr. Monks (1958) - Mr. Hadley
- The FBI Story (1959) - Minister at Funeral (uncredited)
- The Bramble Bush (1960) - Judge Manning
- Oklahoma Territory (1960) - George Blackwell
- Tess of the Storm Country (1960) - Mr. Foley
- Alfred Hitchcock Presents (1961) (Season 6 Episode 34: "Servant Problem") - Harold Standish
- The Honeymoon Machine (1961) - U.S. Senator (uncredited)
- Where Love Has Gone (1964) - Banker (uncredited)
- Fluffy (1965) - Professor (uncredited)
