= Brasher Doubloon =

American doubloon

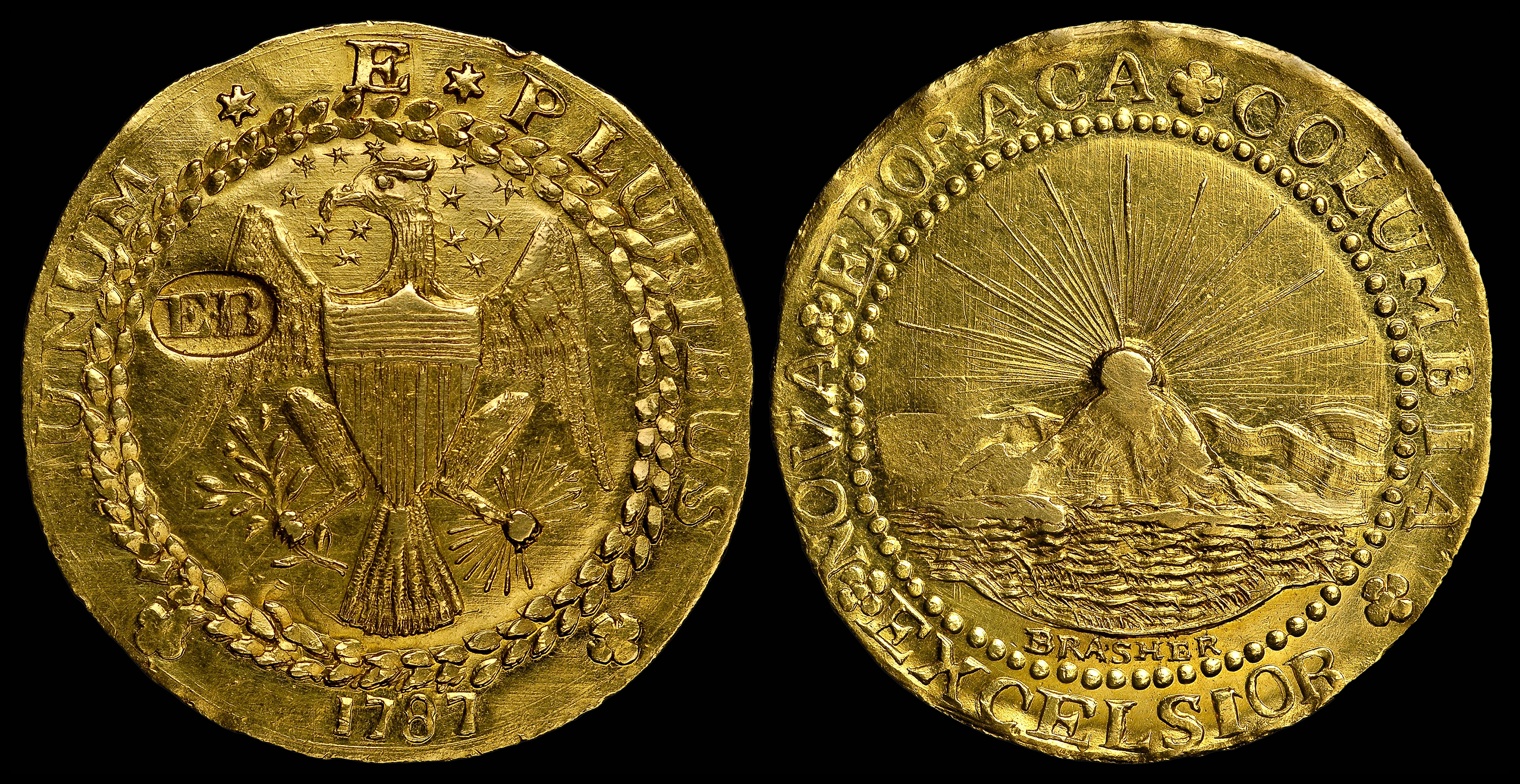
1787 Brasher Doubloon

The Brasher Doubloon is a rare American doubloon of eight escudos worth sixteen dollars, privately minted in and after 1787.

== Description ==
The reverse shows a version of Great Seal of the United States; however, the eagle depicted has a crest on its head. Text reads E pluribus unum and the year 1787. It is punched with initials EB in varying locations depending on issue. The obverse shows the arms of New York State, with motto NOVA EBORACA COLUMBIA EXCELSIOR ("New York — Columbia — Ever upward.") and the name BRASHER.

== History ==
In 1787, Ephraim Brasher, a goldsmith and silversmith, submitted a petition to the State of New York to mint copper coins. The petition was denied when New York decided not to get into the business of minting copper coinage. Brasher was already quite highly regarded for his skills, and his hallmark (which he not only stamped on his own coins but also on other coinage sent to him for assay proofing) was highly appreciated by the United States. Brasher struck various coppers, in addition to a small quantity of gold coins, over the next few years.

This coin, valued at eight Spanish escudos or sixteen Spanish dollars ($16), is of confusing English colonial nomenclature, called at first the "double doubloon" before settling as the "Spanish doubloon". This was disambiguated in references by calling the $4 the common doubloon or simply doubloon, and the $16 coin the doubloon of eight (escudos). Spanish America did the same as explained in es:doblón.

One of the surviving gold coins, weighing 26.6 grams (0.86 ozt) and composed of 0.917 (22-carat) gold, was sold at a public auction for $625,000 in March 1981.

On January 12, 2005 Heritage Auction Galleries sold all three varieties of Brasher Doubloons as part of their Florida United Numismatists U.S. Coin Auction, Platinum Night Session. The coins realized $2,415,000 for the New York Style EB Punch on Wing NGC AU55, $2,990,000 for the unique New York Style EB Punch on Breast NGC XF45 and $690,000 for the rare but less iconic Lima Style Doubloon. The unique Brasher Doubloon, the first gold coin made for the United States, was sold in December 2011 by rare-coin dealer, Steven L. Contursi of Laguna Beach, California, to Certified Acceptance Corporation (CAC) of Far Hills, New Jersey. An undisclosed Wall Street investment firm subsequently purchased it from Blanchard and Company of New Orleans, Louisiana for nearly $7.4 million, it was the most money ever paid for a coin minted in the United States. This record was broken by a Brasher Doubloon sold in January 2021 by Heritage Auctions for $9.36 million, a world record for a gold coin sold in a public auction.

The coin was the subject of Raymond Chandler's Philip Marlowe 1942 mystery novel The High Window, which was made into a film, Time to Kill, in 1942, and The Brasher Doubloon, in 1947. It is also mentioned in Lawrence Block's 1980 Bernie Rhodenbarr mystery The Burglar Who Studied Spinoza and John Bellairs's 1992 The Mansion in the Mist, as well as in Lavie Tidhar's 2018 middle-grade mystery Candy.

== See also ==
- List of most expensive coins
