= Charles Russell (actor) =

American actor (1918–1985)

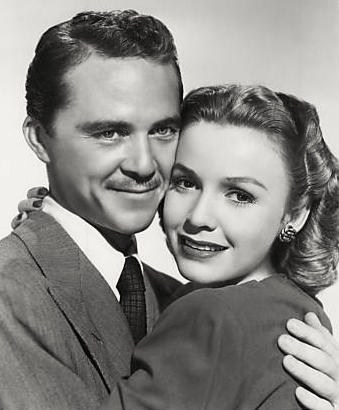
- Charles Russell with actress Mary Anderson in Behind Green Lights (1946)
- Born: March 31, 1918; New York City, US
- Died: January 18, 1985 (aged 66); Beverly Hills, California, US
- Occupations: Actor, producer
- Years active: 1943–1950 (as actor)
- Spouse: Nancy Guild (m. 1947; div. 1950)
- Children: 1

Charles Russell (March 31, 1918 – January 18, 1985) was an American movie and radio actor who appeared in 17 movies between 1943 and 1950. He was also a television producer who worked in Hollywood and Australia.

== Acting career ==
Born in New York City, Russell made his debut in an uncredited part as a ball player in Ladies' Day (1943). His last film was Chinatown at Midnight (1949). He originated the role of insurance investigator Johnny Dollar in the CBS Radio series Yours Truly, Johnny Dollar in 1949, playing the role until being replaced by Edmond O'Brien in 1950.

Russell married fellow 20th Century-Fox contract player Nancy Guild in 1947, and they had one child, a daughter. They divorced in 1950.

== Producer ==
Russell moved into television producing working on shows such as The Untouchables and Naked City.

He worked for a number of years in Australia at the Australian Broadcasting Corporation (ABC). John Cameron, head of drama at ABC in the 1970s, said Russell "was a man of great talents, who had developed a drinking problem to help him cope with the pressures of American network television. He was winning his battle, but still had bad spells. He gave ABC a great shot in the arm, and built a degree of professionalism in its drama filming that continued to pay dividends long after he returned to America." Russell died in Beverly Hills, California.

== Filmography as Actor ==
Year	Title	Role	Notes
1943	Ladies' Day	Ball Player	Uncredited
1943	Bombardier	Instructor	
1944	The Purple Heart	Lt. Kenneth Bayforth	
1945	Captain Eddie	Sgt. Jim Reynolds	
1946	Behind Green Lights	Arthur Templeton	
1946	Johnny Comes Flying Home	Miles Carey	
1946	Wake Up and Dream	Lieutenant Coles	
1947	The Late George Apley	Howard Boulder	
1947	Beyond Our Own	Peter Rogers	
1948	Give My Regards to Broadway	Arthur Waldron Jr.	
1948	Canon City	Tolley	
1948	Night Wind	Ralph Benson	
1948	Inner Sanctum	Harold Dunlap	
1948	Trouble Preferred	Lt. Rod Brooks	
1949	Tucson	Gregg Johnson	
1949	Mary Ryan, Detective	Detective Baker	Uncredited
1949	Chinatown at Midnight	Fred Morgan	
1950	Breakthrough	U.S. Soldier	Uncredited, (final film role)

== Select Producing Credits ==
- The Untouchables (1959–60) - producer
- The Alfred Hitchcock Hour (1962) - producer
- Arrest and Trial (1963) – producer
- Naked City (1962–63) - producer
- Judd for the Defense (1967–68) - producer
- Devlin (1971) - executive producer
- The Survivor (1972) - script editor
- Seven Little Australians (1973) - executive producer
- Ben Hall (1975)
- Games for Parents and Other Children (1975) - producer
