= Nancy Guild =

American actress (1925-1999)

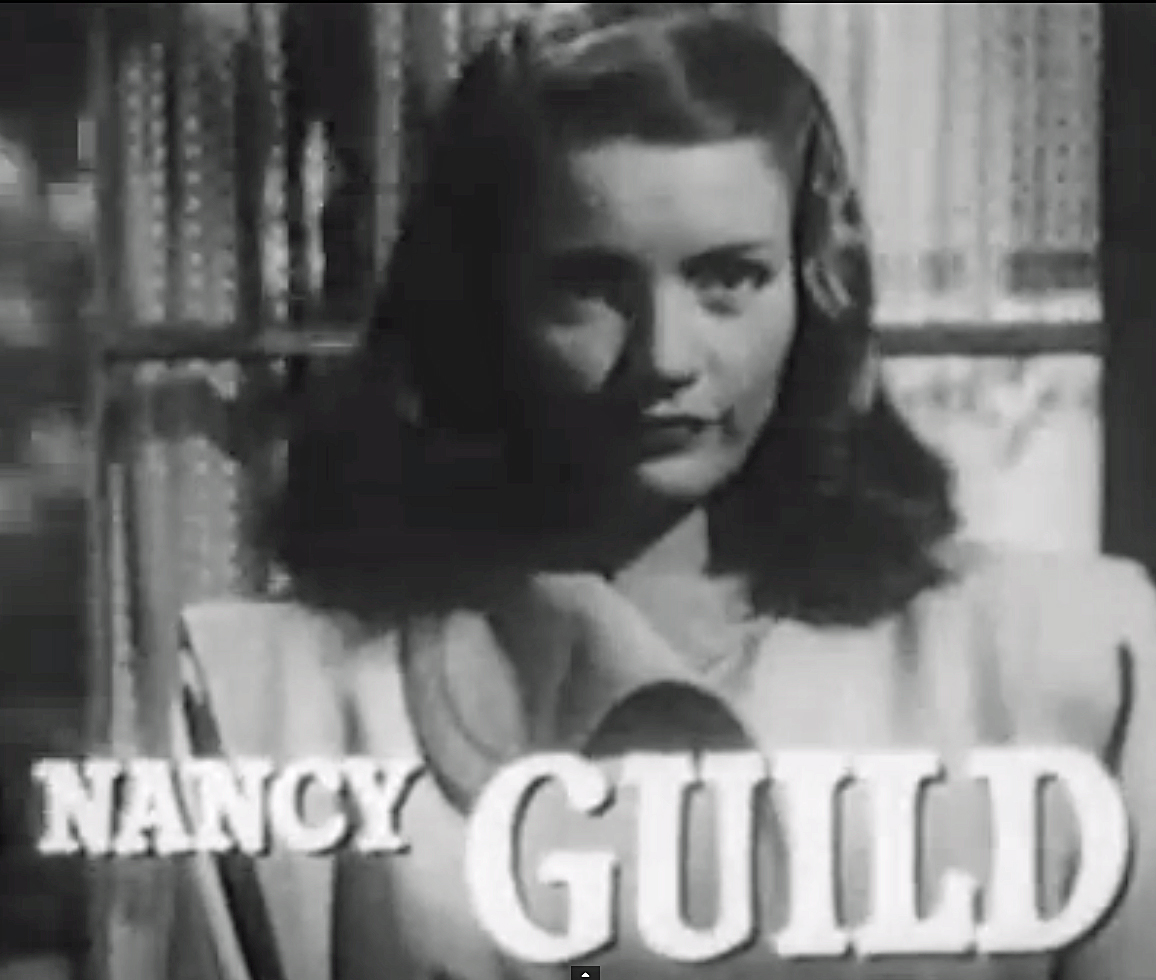
- Nancy Guild in the trailer for The Brasher Doubloon (1947)
- Born: Nancy Gertrude Guild; October 11, 1925; Los Angeles, California, U.S.
- Died: August 16, 1999 (aged 73); East Hampton, New York, U.S.
- Occupation: Actress
- Years active: 1946–1971
- Spouses: Charles Russell (m. 1947; div. 1949); Ernest H. Martin (m. 1951; div. 1975); John Bryson (m. 1983; div. 1995)
- Children: 3

Nancy Gertrude Guild (/ɡaɪld/ GYLDE; October 11, 1925 – August 16, 1999) was an American film actress of the 1940s and 1950s. She appeared in Somewhere in the Night (1946), The Brasher Doubloon (1947), and the comedy Abbott and Costello Meet the Invisible Man (1951). Although appearing in major films, Guild never achieved as much fame at 20th Century Fox, the studio that had signed her to a seven-year contract, as she had hoped, and eventually stopped acting.

== Early life ==
Guild was born at Hollywood Hospital on October 11, 1925, the third child and only daughter of Herbert Hamilton Guild and the former Zilpah Hebert.

== Career ==
Guild was a freshman at the University of Arizona when a photographer from Life magazine noticed her. After her picture was published in a spread on campus fashions, Guild received screen tests at five Hollywood studios, and she was signed by 20th Century Fox. The studio's publicity writers declared "Guild rhymes with wild!" when hyping her in Somewhere in the Night (1946), her first film, directed by Joseph L. Mankiewicz.

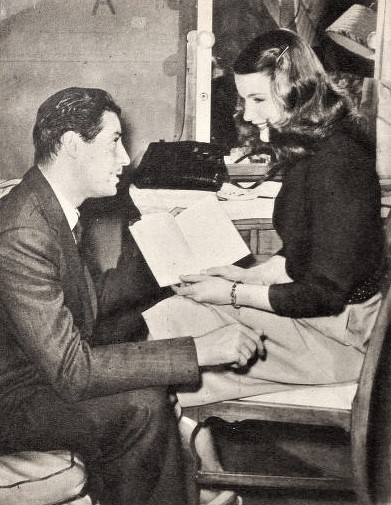
With John Hodiak in Somewhere in the Night

Guild went on to play the female lead in The Brasher Doubloon (1947). She and then-husband Charles Russell then appeared together in the musical Give My Regards to Broadway (1948). She played a dual role as Marie Antoinette and the hypnotized love interest of Orson Welles in the 1949 adaptation of Alexandre Dumas’ historical novel about Count Cagliostro and the Affair of the Diamond Necklace. After leaving Fox, she appeared in movies as a freelance and as a contract star at Universal-International, where she appeared in Little Egypt, Abbott and Costello Meet the Invisible Man picture and the Francis the Talking Mule movie Francis Covers the Big Town (1953).

Guild was a panelist on the DuMont network's Where Was I? game show in 1952-1953. She appeared occasionally on television and briefly returned to the movies in Otto Preminger's Such Good Friends (1971).

== Personal life ==
Guild's first husband was actor Charles Russell, whom she married on April 26, 1947. They divorced in November 1949 after their daughter was born. On August 14, 1951, she married producer Ernest H. Martin. They had two daughters and divorced in 1975. On April 5, 1983, Guild married photojournalist John Bryson; they divorced in 1995.

== Death ==
On August 16, 1999, she died of emphysema in the village of East Hampton, New York at the age of 73.

== Filmography ==
Year	Title	Role
1946	Somewhere in the Night	Christy Smith
1947	The Brasher Doubloon	Merle Davis
1948	Give My Regards to Broadway	Helen Wallace
1949	Black Magic	Marie Antoinette / Lorenza
1951	Abbott and Costello Meet the Invisible Man	Helen Gray
1951	Little Egypt	Sylvia Graydon
1953	Francis Covers the Big Town	Alberta Ames
1971	Such Good Friends	Molly
