= Abbott and Costello Meet the Invisible Man =

1951 comedy horror film directed by Charles Lamont

- Theatrical release poster
- Directed by: Charles Lamont
- Screenplay by: Robert Lees; Frederic I. Rinaldo; John Grant
- Story by: Hugh Wedlock Jr. Howard Snyder
- Based on: The Invisible Man; 1897 novel by H. G. Wells
- Produced by: Howard Christie
- Starring: Bud Abbott; Lou Costello; Nancy Guild; Arthur Franz
- Cinematography: George Robinson
- Edited by: Virgil Vogel
- Music by: Joseph Gershenson
- Production company: Universal-International
- Distributed by: Universal-International
- Release date: March 14, 1951 (US)
- Running time: 82 minutes
- Country: United States
- Language: English
- Budget: $627,000
- Box office: $1,550,000 (US rentals)

Abbott and Costello Meet the Invisible Man (Note: On screen title is Bud Abbott Lou Costello Meet the Invisible Man (without the word "and" and using their full names).) is a 1951 American science fiction comedy film directed by Charles Lamont and starring the team of Abbott and Costello alongside Nancy Guild.

The film depicts the misadventures of Lou Francis and Bud Alexander, two private detectives investigating the murder of a boxing promoter. The film was part of a series in which the duo meet classic characters from Universal's stable, including Frankenstein, the Mummy and the Keystone Kops.

== Plot ==
Lou Francis and Bud Alexander graduate from a private detective school. Tommy Nelson, a middleweight boxer, brings them their first case. Tommy is a fugitive accused of murdering his manager. He asks the duo to accompany him on a visit to his fiancée, Helen Gray. He wants her uncle, Dr. Philip Gray, to inject him with a special serum which will render Tommy invisible so he can investigate his manager's murder and prove his innocence. Dr. Gray adamantly refuses, arguing the serum is unstable, recalling that the formula's discoverer, Jack Griffin, was driven insane by it and did not regain visibility until he was dead.

As the police arrive, Tommy injects himself with the serum and becomes invisible. Detective Roberts questions Dr. Gray and Helen while Bud and Lou search for Tommy. Helen and Tommy convince Bud and Lou to help find the real killer after Tommy explains that the murder occurred after he refused to "throw" a fight, knocking his opponent, Rocky Hanlon, out cold. Morgan, the promoter who fixed the fight, ordered Tommy's manager beaten to death while framing Tommy for the crime.

To investigate undercover, Lou poses as a boxer, with Bud as his manager. At Stillwell's gym, Lou gets in the ring with Rocky. Tommy, still invisible, also gets into the ring knocks out Hanlon, making it appear Lou did. An official match is then arranged. To prove Morgan framed Tommy, Bud and Lou, alongside an invisible Tommy, covertly spy on him at a restaurant. But the serum's effects and Tommy getting drunk complicate the task when the two have to cover for him. Morgan pays off Lou to throw the fight, but when the match occurs with Tommy's invisible help, Hanlon is knocked out yet again after a wildly chaotic boxing match. Morgan plans Bud's murder but is thwarted by Tommy. Bud, Lou, and Tommy fight off Morgan and his goons, but when Tommy is rendered partially visible from some steam, he is wounded and begins bleeding badly. The protagonists rush to the hospital where a blood transfusion is arranged between Lou and Tommy, who have the same blood type. During the transfusion Tommy becomes visible – some of Tommy's blood has apparently entered Lou, who briefly turns invisible, only to reappear with his legs inexplicably on backwards.

== Cast ==
- Bud Abbott as Bud Alexander, Lou's partner and friend
- Lou Costello as Lou Francis, Bud's bumbling friend and partner
- Arthur Franz as Tommy Nelson / The Invisible Man
- Nancy Guild as Helen Gray, Tommy's girlfriend
- Adele Jergens as Boots Marsden, Morgan's girlfriend
- Sheldon Leonard as Morgan, a gangster and Rocky's manager
- William Frawley as Detective Roberts, a detective on the Tommy Nelson case
- Gavin Muir as Dr. Philip Gray, Helen's uncle
- Sam Balter as Radio announcer
- John Daheim as Rocky Hanlon, Tommy's rival and opponent
- Paul Maxey as Dr. James C. Turner, a therapist
- James Best as Tommy Nelson (Franz's stand-in)

== Production ==
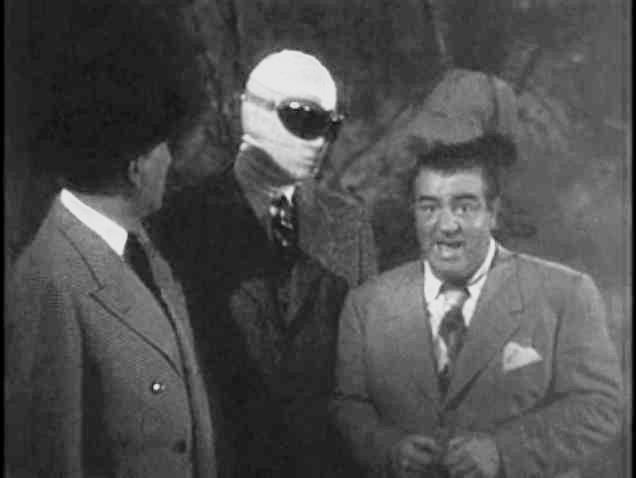
Screenshot from the trailer for the film.

Abbott and Costello Meet the Invisible Man was filmed between October 3 and November 6, 1950. The characters' surnames "Alexander" and "Francis" are Abbott's and Costello's real middle names.

The special effects, which depicted invisibility and other optical illusions, were created by Stanley Horsley, son of cinema pioneer David Horsley. He also did the special effects for The Invisible Man Returns, The Invisible Woman and Invisible Agent.

As a reference to the first Invisible Man film, a photo is featured of the serum's inventor, Dr. John "Jack" Griffin, which is actually a picture of Claude Rains, who played the role in Universal's first Invisible Man film in 1933.

When asked by a reporter whom he has fought in the past, Lou answers, "Chuck Lamont, Bud Grant". The film's director and screenwriter, respectively, are Charles Lamont and John Grant.

== Release ==
The film had a preview screening at The Fox theater in St. Louis, Missouri, on March 9, 1951. The film saw release on Wednesday, March 14.

== Home media ==
This film has been released several times on DVD. First on The Best of Abbott and Costello Volume Three, on August 3, 2004, on October 28, 2008, as part of Abbott and Costello: The Complete Universal Pictures Collection, and in 2015 in the Abbott and Costello Meet the Monsters Collection. Later, the film was included in the 3-disc The Invisible Man: The Complete Legacy Collection and the 21-disc Universal Classic Monsters: Complete 30-Film Collection, both released on September 2, 2014. It was released on Blu-ray on August 28, 2018.
