= Black Magic (1949 film) =

1949 film

- Theatrical release poster
- Directed by: Gregory Ratoff; Orson Welles (uncredited)
- Screenplay by: Charles Bennett; Richard Schayer
- Based on: Mémoires d'un médecin: Joseph Balsamo; 1846-8 novel by Alexandre Dumas
- Produced by: Gregory Ratoff; Dario Sabatello; Edward Small
- Starring: Orson Welles; Nancy Guild; Akim Tamiroff
- Cinematography: Ubaldo Arata; Anchise Brizzi
- Edited by: Fred R. Feitshans Jr. James C. McKay
- Music by: Paul Sawtell
- Production company: Edward Small Productions
- Distributed by: United Artists
- Release date: August 17, 1949
- Running time: 105 minutes
- Countries: United States; Italy
- Language: English
- Budget: ITL 250 million ($1.5 million)

Black Magic is a 1949 Italian–American adventure drama film directed by Gregory Ratoff and starring Orson Welles, Nancy Guild and Akim Tamiroff. Set in the 18th century, it chronicles the life of Joseph Balsamo, an illusionist and charlatan who also went by the alias of Count Cagliostro. It is an adaptation of Alexandre Dumas' 1848 novel Joseph Balsamo.

== Plot ==
Alexandre Dumas, Sr. tells his son Alexandre Dumas, Jr. the story of Joseph Balsamo, also known as Cagliostro. Through flashbacks, we learn that Balsamo was a French Romani boy who endured much hardship. He was tortured under the command of Viscount de Montaigne and his parents were ordered to hang. He was rescued by some Roma people led by Gitano and swears revenge on de Montaigne.

Some years later, he learns the secrets of hypnosis from Dr. Mesmer (Charles Goldner). Ignoring the doctor's advice that he use his powers for healing, he exploits his new talent to the full, gaining wealth and prestige. After changing his name to Count Cagliostro, he becomes famous throughout Europe. Things begin to go downhill when he enters a plot to substitute a young girl called Lorenza for Queen Marie Antoinette along with gypsies Gitano and Zoraida. The plot is organized by de Montaigne in association with Madame du Barry. They plan for Lorenza to impersonate the Queen and buy a frivolous necklace for a large sum of money.

Zoraida becomes jealous of Lorenza, who has fallen under Cagliostro's power, forgetting her true love, Gilbert. Gilbert runs away with Lorenza. Cagliostro recaptures her and marries her, hypnotised. King Louis XV dies and Marie Antoinette becomes queen. She orders Cagliostro to leave the country. Cagliostro gets Lorenza to impersonate the Queen and pretend to be in love with de Montaigne. He buys the necklace and the Queen's reputation is damaged (echoing the real-life Affair of the Diamond Necklace).

Zoraida brings Lorenza to Marie Antoinette and reveals Cagliostro's plot. Lorenza agrees to testify against Cagliostro, but at the trial, Cagliostro hypnotizes her into stating that she knows nothing. Cagliostro hypnotizes Gilbert into testifying against the queen. However, Dr. Mesmer then uses the necklace to hypnotize Cagliostro into confessing. Cagliostro awakens from his trance and escapes with the hypnotized Lorenza. Gilbert pursues them and kills Cagliostro in a sword fight.

== Cast ==
- Orson Welles as Joseph Balsamo a.k.a. Count Cagliostro
- Nancy Guild as Marie Antoinette / Lorenza
- Akim Tamiroff as Gitano
- Frank Latimore as Captain Gilbert de Rezel
- Valentina Cortese as Zoraida
- Margot Grahame as Madame du Barry
- Stephen Bekassy as Viscount de Montaigne
- Berry Kroeger as Alexandre Dumas Sr.
- Gregory Gaye as Chambord / Monk
- Raymond Burr as Alexandre Dumas, Jr.
- Charles Goldner as Dr. Franz Anton Mesmer
- Lee Kresel as King Louis XVI / Innkeeper
- Robert Atkins as King Louis XV
- Nicholas Bruce as De Remy
- Franco Corsaro as Chico
- Annielo Mele as Joseph Balsamo, as a child
- Ronald Adam as Court President
- Bruce Belfrage as Crown Prosecutor
- Alexander Danaroff as Dr. Duval / Baron von Minden
- Leonardo Scavino as Gaston / Beniamino Balsamo
- Tamara Shayne as Maria Balsamo
- Joop van Hulzen as Minister of Justice
- Giuseppe Varni as Boehmer
- Tatyana Pavlova as The mother

== Production ==
=== Origins ===
The movie was originally known as Cagliostro. Producer Edward Small went through a number of directors and stars in trying to get this film off the ground, starting in 1943. Charles Boyer was to star with Akim Tamiroff, and Irving Pichel directing, then in early 1944 J. Carrol Naish was reported to play Alexandre Dumas, Sr. Later that year, George Sanders was announced as the star with Douglas Sirk directing. Louis Hayward was also at one stage announced to star. In 1943, Hedda Hopper suggested Orson Welles should play the lead role. Writer Charles Bennett mentioned that José Ferrer was also approached play the lead, but he demanded a three-picture contract from Small who refused.

=== European project and merger ===
Shortly after World War II, another Cagliostro surfaced in Europe. French producer Henry de Saint-Girons announced his version in April 1946, to be directed in color by Robert Péguy from a script by Pierre Maury. But the modest production, to be filmed at the small Château de Vieux Moulin in Nièvre, was quickly abandoned due to logistical problems (see The Marriage of Ramuntcho). André Paulvé of the better-heeled DisCina relaunched the idea a few months later, based on a new script by André-Paul Antoine. Mid-April 1947, he announced from New York that he had secured an agreement to proceed with the film, to be directed by Francesco De Robertis in partnership with his usual Italian partners Scalera. Filming was due to start in the summer of that year, and a French lead was deemed a possibility but not a sure bet.

In the same month, Greg Ratoff revealed that he had signed on to helm Small's version, also slated to film in the summer. At the time, some location work in Balsamo's former French dwellings was considered. Ratoff also said that he hoped to hire Paul Henreid or James Mason, although Mason apparently did not wish to return to Europe at that time. By June, Small had set his sights on filming in Mexico, however the country proved more expensive than expected. The American producer thus announced the relocation of his production to Scalera Studios, effectively taking over the concurrent project planned there.

Ratoff flew straight from Mexico to Rome mid-July to oversee the relocation. Small estimated he could save as much as 40 percent on the $3 million the film would have cost in Hollywood. While he could use American assets that had been frozen by the Italians during World War II, the bulk of his savings came from the cheaper workforce. Each of the thousand wigs ordered by production cost 20 percent of their American equivalent, while dresses that would run between $3000 and $5000 there were procured for $700 each. Local extras received $3 to $4 per day, whereas their Los Angeles counterparts would command $11 to $16.

=== Final casting and filming ===
Orson Welles only signed on in September 1947. The star said that Small approached him "very cleverly with the role of Cagliostro. He waited 'til I had reread the Dumas novels and become so 'hypnotized' by the scoundrel that I felt I had to play him. Then Small announced casually, 'Gregory Ratoff is going to direct'. That cinched it. Gregory is a great friend, and more fun to work with than anybody I know." Like director Ratoff, supporting actors Frank Latimore and Nancy Guild were on loan from Twentieth Century-Fox.

Principal photography mainly took place at Scalera's Rome studios from early October 1947 to late January 1948. Another perk offered by Italy was the authentic locations that could be woven into the film, such as the Royal Palace of Caserta, the Villa d'Este gardens and the Santi Nereo e Achilleo church. However, Small was afraid to fly over the Atlantic ocean and did not personally oversee the shoot. According to Bennett, Ratoff and Welles took advantage of this to alter his script. Welles allegedly also directed several scenes in the film. When the footage came back from Italy, it was deemed unreleasable and Bennett was summoned to write new scenes, which he directed himself at United Artists over four nights. When he approached Welles for the reshoots, the latter proved surprisingly cooperative, promising: "Charles, I'm a very good soldier. I will do what I'm told!".

== Release ==
United Artists were so enthusiastic about the film they agreed to distribute the film for 25 percent of the profits as opposed to their usual fee of 27.5 percent. The studio commissioned a $250,000 advertising campaign from agency Monroe, Greenthal and Company. As part of the campaign, they sent four hypnotists on tour to promote the film and hypnotize journalists as well as hosting stunts featuring someone being buried alive as featured in the film. Black Magic opened in the U.S. on August 17, 1949, in a large release covering 400 key cities.

=== Reception ===
The film received mixed reviews. With its wide release, the film opened at number one at the U.S. box office.

== In popular culture ==
The 1995 novel Dissolvenza al nero (lit. 'Fade to Black') by Italian writer Davide Ferrario has Welles involved in a murder mystery while in Rome for the production of Black Magic. It was adapted into the 2006 film Fade to Black, with Danny Huston playing Welles.

In issue 62 of Superman from January–February 1950, Welles discovers a Martian invasion (reminiscent of his famous War of the Worlds broadcast) during the filming of Black Magic, and teams with the titular superhero to thwart it.
