= Francis Covers the Big Town =

1953 film by Arthur Lubin

- Theatrical release poster
- Directed by: Arthur Lubin
- Written by: Oscar Brodney (story and screenplay); David Stern (characters)
- Produced by: Leonard Goldstein
- Starring: Donald O'Connor; Yvette Duguay; Gene Lockhart; Nancy Guild
- Cinematography: Carl E. Guthrie
- Edited by: Milton Carruth
- Music by: Frank Skinner; Herman Stein
- Production company: Universal Pictures
- Distributed by: Universal-International
- Release date: June 10, 1953
- Running time: 86 minutes
- Country: United States
- Language: English
- Box office: $1.8 million (US)

Francis Covers the Big Town is a 1953 American black-and-white comedy film from Universal-International, produced by Leonard Goldstein, directed by Arthur Lubin, that stars Donald O'Connor, Yvette Duguay, and Gene Lockhart. The distinctive voice of Francis is a voice-over by actor Chill Wills.

This is the fourth film in Universal-International's Francis the Talking Mule series continuing the misadventures of Peter Stirling and his friend Francis. Diabolique argued it was the best in the series.

== Plot ==
Peter lands a job at a big New York City newspaper and while on assignment gets framed for a murder.

Arriving in New York City with dreams of being a star reporter, Peter has to begin as a harried copy boy. Luckily, he is able to find a small apartment in the Little Italy section that has an attached stable for Francis. Francis can talk to the Police Horses, so he is able to pick up many reliable tips that he passes on to Peter. Before long, Peter is promoted to a full-fledged crime beat reporter.

Peter's information is a little TOO accurate for the Police Commissioner and several District Attorney's, who demand to know the source of his information. Of course, Peter cannot tell them Luckily, Peter's editor Tom Henderson backs his silence.

Peter's romantic life is muddled by contrast. The 18-year-old daughter of a local baker, Maria Scola, has a crush on him. But Peter is leaning towards Alberta Ames, the Society Page reporter. Peter quickly learns that a triple feature at the movies is NOT the high-bred Alberta's idea of a good time.

The last straw for the police is when Peter/Francis predict a major jewel robbery IN ADVANCE. Peter is subjected to a battery of psychiatric tests. Chief shrink Dr.Goodrich demands to meet t his "dumb animal" Peter speaks of. Annoyed, Francis not only talks to him;he ends up driving Goodrich to a nervous breakdown. After this, other psychiatrists are afraid to go near Peter.

So-called respectable citizen Jefferson Garnet is worried Peter may expose that he makes his money through extortion. With Alberta as an unwitting dupe, Peter is brought to a party at his mansion. While Garnet and Peter are alone in his library, somebody shoots Garnet dead from behind. Peter makes the mistake of picking up the murder gun and is arrested---with very little chance of being cleared.

Francis is giving Maria glamorization tips---she nervously removes her dress in front of Francis---when the bad news comes. Maria convinces Francis to reveal himself in court as a witness. It is troublesome to swear in a mule ("Raise your right hoof") and the court adjourns in confusion. But Francis assumes the seed of innocence has been planted, and the murderer will try to dispose of him. He does, and walks into a police trap;clearing Peter.

Peter will be staying in New York City---Francis has fallen in love with a Zebra in the Central Park Zoo,

== Cast ==
- Donald O'Connor as Peter Stirling
- Yvette Duguay as Maria Scola
- Gene Lockhart as Tom Henderson
- Nancy Guild as Alberta Ames
- William Harrigan as Deputy Chief Inspector Hansen
- Silvio Minciotti as Salvatore Scola
- Lowell Gilmore as Jefferson Garnet
- Larry Gates as Dan Austin
- Hanley Stafford as Dr. Goodrich
- Gale Gordon as District Attorney Evans
- Forrest Lewis as Judge Stanley
- John Qualen as Defense Attorney Cavendish
- Chill Wills as Voice of Francis The Mule
- MOLLY as Francis The Mule
- James Flavin as Detective Mulvaney (uncredited)
- Douglas Wood as Dr.Glossera (uncredited)
- Hans Herbert as Dr. Armitage (uncredited)
- Leonard Penn as Brad Mitchell (uncredited)

== Production ==
Production of the film was announced in July 1951 and was to be the third in the Francis series.

Oscar Brodney was assigned to write the script. David Stern reportedly also worked on the script.

Filming started in August 1951 and involved ten days location shooting in New York.

Francis was flown to New York and back on a cargo plane, which cost $700 plus airfares for his trainer and two handlers.

At one stage of production, the film was going to be known as Francis, Racket Buster.

Director Arthur Lubin complained during filming that he was becoming typecast as an animal director. He hoped to make The Interruption from a suspense story by W. W. Mason "just to remind producers that I can direct people too."

== Home media ==
The original film, Francis (1950), was released in 1978 as one of the first-ever titles in the new LaserDisc format, DiscoVision Catalog #22-003. It was then re-issued on LaserDisc in May 1994 by MCA/Universal Home Video (Catalog #: 42024) as part of an Encore Edition Double Feature with Francis Goes to the Races (1951).

The first two Francis films were released again in 2004 by Universal Pictures on Region 1 and Region 4 DVD, along with the next two in the series, as The Adventures of Francis the Talking Mule Vol. 1. Several years later, Universal released all 7 Francis films as a set on three Region 1 and Region 4 DVDs, Francis The Talking Mule: The Complete Collection.
