= Stanley Rabjohn =

American film editor

- Born: October 6, 1914; Denver, Colorado, United States
- Died: July 21, 2001; Coleville, California, United States
- Occupation: Film editor

Stanley E. Rabjohn (October 6, 1914 – July 21, 2001) was an American film editor.

== Selected filmography (as editor) ==
- The Bullfighters (1945)
- Behind Green Lights (1946)
- Fighter Attack (1953)
- Paris Encounter (1959)
- Hang the Men High (1960)
- X-15 (1961)
- The Deadly Companions (1961)
- The Psycho Lover (1970)
- Where Does It Hurt? (1971)
