= Mary Anderson (actress, born 1918) =

American actress (1918–2014)

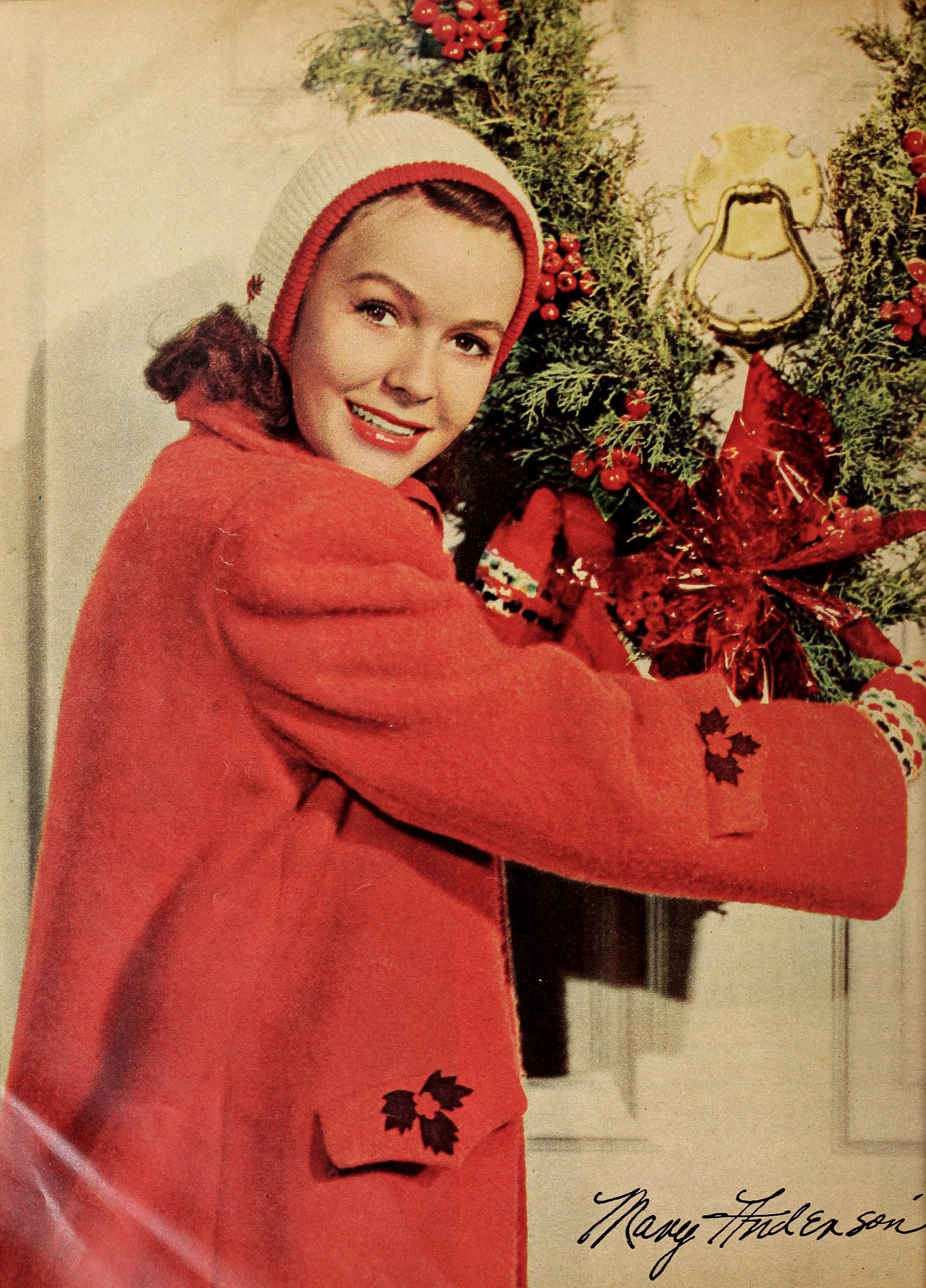
- Anderson in 1944
- Born: Mary Bebe Anderson; April 3, 1918; Birmingham, Alabama, U.S.
- Died: April 6, 2014 (aged 96); Burbank, California, U.S.
- Resting place: Forest Lawn Memorial Park, Hollywood Hills
- Other name: Mary B. Anderson
- Occupation: Actress
- Years active: 1939–1965
- Spouses: Leonard M. Behrens (m. 1940; div. 1950) Leon Shamroy (m. 1953; died 1974)
- Children: 1
- Family: James Anderson (brother)

Mary Bebe Anderson (April 3, 1918 – April 6, 2014) was an American actress, who appeared in 31 films and 22 television productions between 1939 and 1965. She was best known for her small supporting role in the film Gone With the Wind as well as one of the main characters in Alfred Hitchcock's 1944 film Lifeboat.

== Early life ==
Anderson's younger brother James Anderson (1921–1969) was also an actor, best known as Bob Ewell in To Kill a Mockingbird (1962). They appeared in one film together, 1951's Hunt the Man Down.

== Career ==
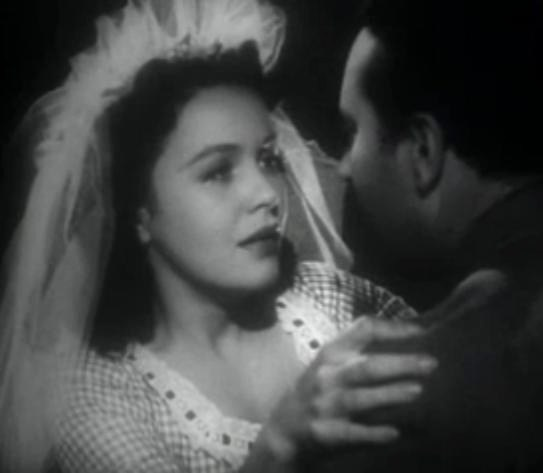
Anderson in Cheers for Miss Bishop (1941)

After two uncredited roles, Anderson made her first important screen appearance in Gone With the Wind (1939). After auditioning as one of the 1,400 actresses involved in the search for Scarlett, she received the supporting role of Maybelle Merriwether.

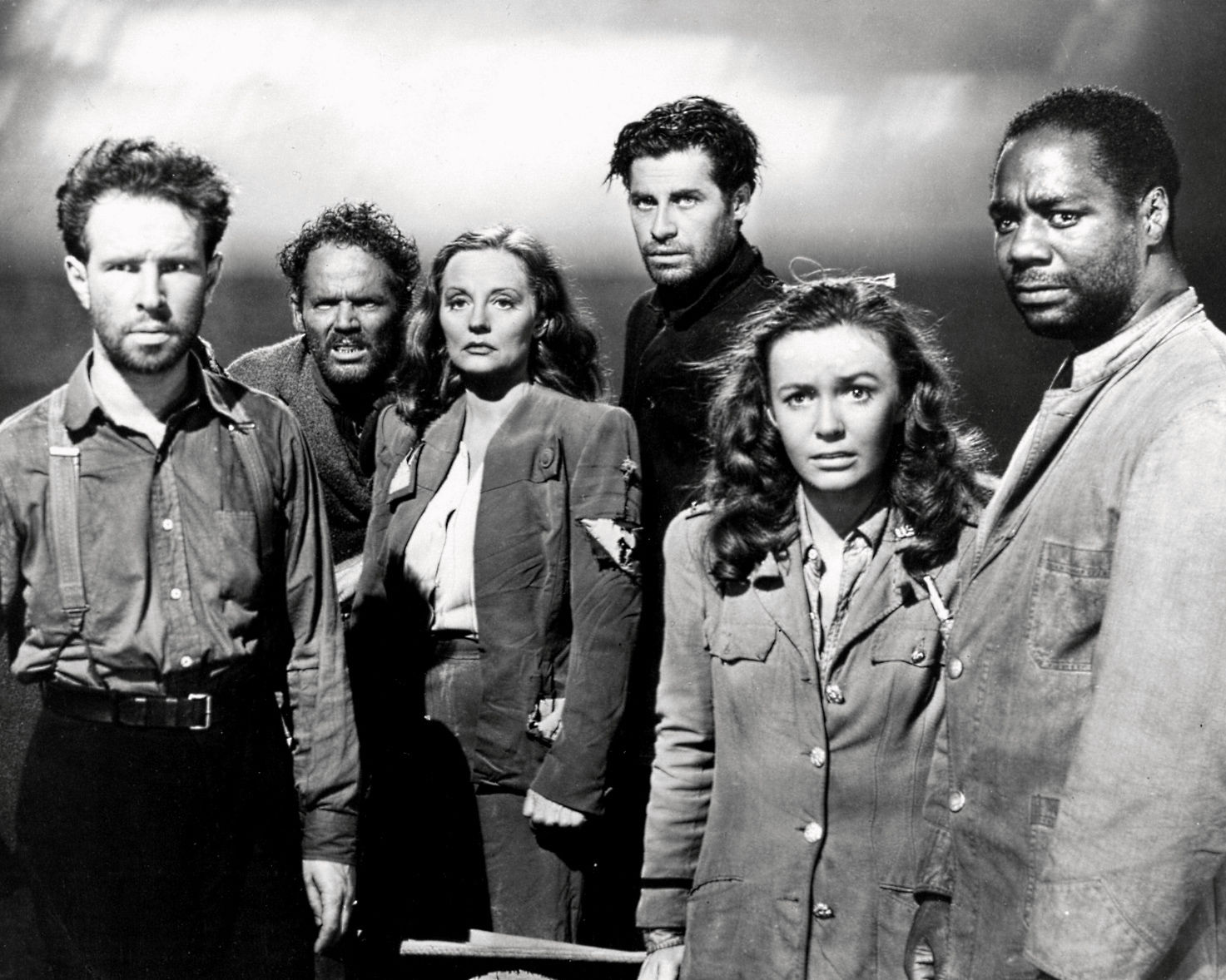
Hitchcock's Lifeboat (1944) with Hume Cronyn, Henry Hull, Tallulah Bankhead, John Hodiak, Anderson and Canada Lee

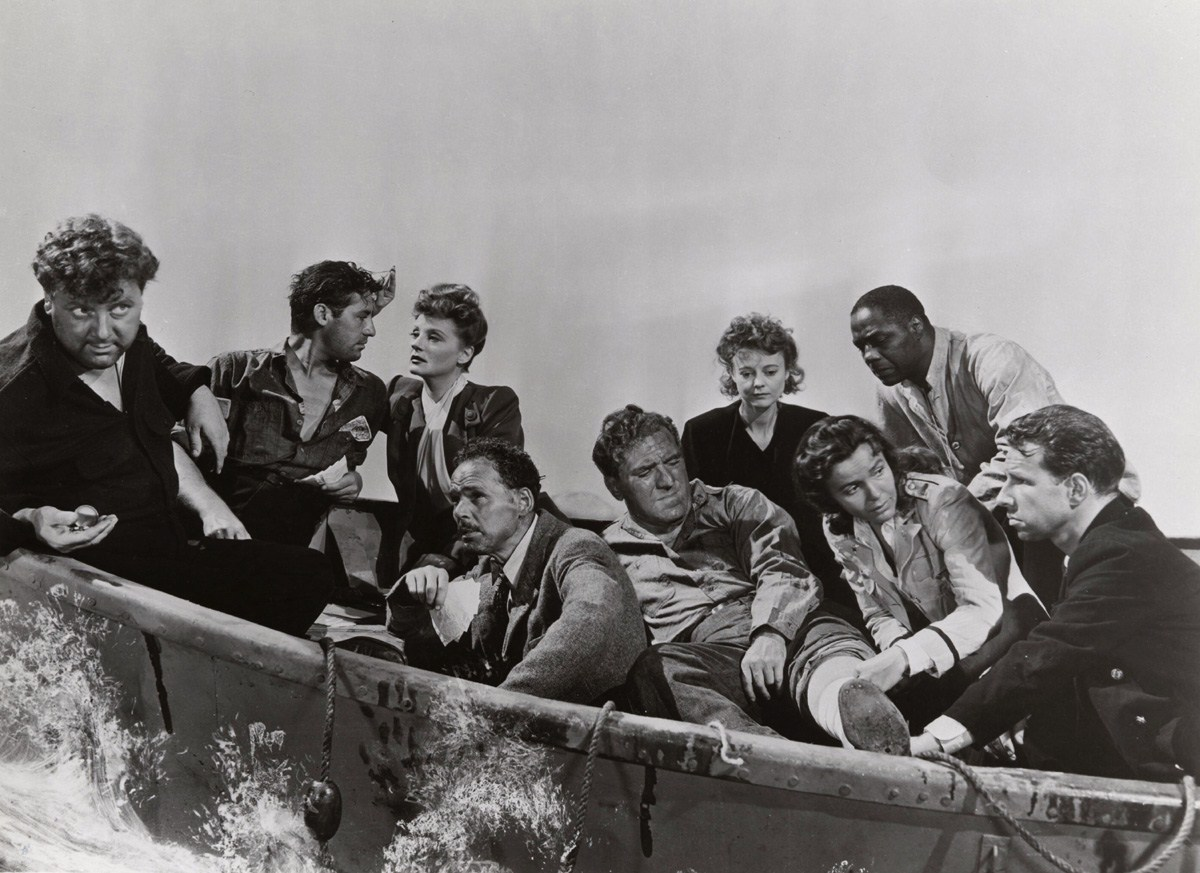
L-R: Walter Slezak, John Hodiak, Tallulah Bankhead, Henry Hull, William Bendix, Heather Angel, Mary Anderson, Canada Lee, and Hume Cronyn in Alfred Hitchcock's Lifeboat (1944)

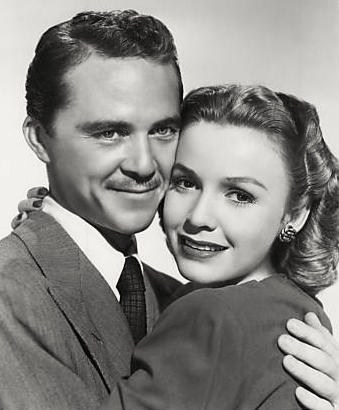
Anderson with actor Charles Russell in Behind Green Lights (1946)

In 1944, Anderson played Alice the nurse, one of the ten characters in the Alfred Hitchcock film Lifeboat. Ending her film career in the early 1950s, she occasionally acted on television, for example as Catherine Harrington on Peyton Place in 1964 (episodes 2-20). She made a guest appearance in Perry Mason as Arlene Scott in "The Case of the Rolling Bones" (1958).

== Death ==
Anderson died from a stroke in Burbank, California, on April 6, 2014, at the age of 96.

== Partial filmography ==
Year	Film	Role	Director	Notes
1939	The Women	Young Girl	George Cukor	uncredited
1939	Gone with the Wind	Maybelle Merriwether	Victor Fleming	
1939	Mendelssohn's Wedding March	Hilda		uncredited
1940	'Til We Meet Again	Girl	William K. Howard	uncredited
1940	Flight Angels	Daisy Lou	Lewis Seiler	
1940	The Sea Hawk	Maid of Honor	Michael Curtiz	uncredited
1940	All This, and Heaven Too	Rebecca Jay	Anatole Litvak	
1940	My Love Came Back	Woman Mistaken for Amelia by Tony	Curtis Bernhardt	uncredited
1940	A Dispatch from Reuter's	Girl with Max	William Dieterle	uncredited
1941	Cheers for Miss Bishop	Amy Saunders	Tay Garnett	
1941	Under Age	Edie Baird	Edward Dmytryk	
1941	Henry Aldrich for President	Phyllis Michael	Hugh Bennett	
1941	Bahama Passage	Mary Ainsworth	Edward H. Griffith	
1942	Henry and Dizzy	Phyillis Michael	Hugh Bennett	
1943	The Song of Bernadette	Jeanne Abadie	Henry King	
1944	Lifeboat	Alice MacKenzie	Alfred Hitchcock	
1944	The Keys of the Kingdom		John M. Stahl	uncredited
1944	Wilson	Eleanor Wilson	Henry King	
1945	Within These Walls	Anne Howland	H. Bruce Humberstone	
1945	A Tree Grows in Brooklyn		Elia Kazan	uncredited
1946	Behind Green Lights	Nora Bard	Otto Brower	
1946	To Each His Own	Corinne Piersen	Mitchell Leisen	
1947	Whispering City	Mary Roberts	Fedor Ozep	
1950	The Asphalt Jungle	Police Broadcaster	John Huston	voice, uncredited
1950	The Underworld Story	Molly Rankin	Cy Endfield	
1950	Last of the Buccaneers	Swallow	Lew Landers	
1950	Hunt the Man Down	Alice McGuire / Peggy Linden	George Archainbaud	
1951	Chicago Calling	Mary Cannon	John Reinhardt	
1951	Passage West	Myra Johnson		
1952	One Big Affair	Hilda Jones	Peter Godfrey	
1953	I, the Jury	Eileen Vickers	Harry Essex	
1953	Dangerous Crossing	Anna Quinn	Joseph M. Newman	
1959	Jet Over the Atlantic	Maria	Byron Haskin	
1962	Lawman	Martha Carson	Richard C. Sarafian	"S4/E37 "The Actor"
1965	Daniel Boone	Marni Tolson	John Florea	S2/E12 "The First Beau"
1980	Cheech and Chong's Next Movie	Old Lady in Music Store	Tommy Chong	uncredited; final film role
