= Tucson (film) =

1949 film by William F. Claxton

- Theatrical release poster
- Directed by: William F. Claxton
- Written by: Arnold Belgard
- Produced by: Sol M. Wurtzel
- Starring: Jimmy Lydon; Penny Edwards; Deanna Wayne; Charles Russell; Joe Sawyer; Walter Sande
- Cinematography: Benjamin H. Kline
- Edited by: Frank Baldridge
- Music by: Darrell Calker
- Production company: Sol M. Wurtzel Productions
- Distributed by: 20th Century Fox
- Release date: April 27, 1949
- Running time: 64 minutes
- Country: United States
- Language: English

Tucson is a 1949 American drama film directed by William F. Claxton, written by Arnold Belgard and starring Jimmy Lydon, Penny Edwards, Deanna Wayne, Charles Russell, Joe Sawyer and Walter Sande. It was released on April 27, 1949, by 20th Century-Fox.

== Plot ==
Carefree University of Arizona student Andy Bryant's preoccupation with training his American Quarter Horse for an upcoming intercollegiate rodeo nearly results in tragedy for his best friend. Shaken by the event, Andy vows to focus on his studies and make amends.

== Cast ==
- Jimmy Lydon as Andy Bryant
- Penny Edwards as Laurie Sherman
- Deanna Wayne as Jennifer Johnson
- Charles Russell as Gregg Johnson
- Joe Sawyer as Tod Bryant
- Walter Sande as George Reeves
- Lyn Wilde as Gertie Peck
- Marcia Mae Jones as Polly Johnson
- John Ridgely as Ben
- Grandon Rhodes as Dean Sherman
- Gil Stratton as Jerry Twill
- Harry Lauter as George Reeves Jr.
- The Cass County Boys as Musical Ensemble
