= Give My Regards to Broadway (film) =

1948 film by Lloyd Bacon

- Directed by: Lloyd Bacon
- Screenplay by: Samuel Hoffenstein; Elizabeth Reinhardt
- Story by: John Klempner
- Produced by: Walter Morosco; Darryl F. Zanuck
- Starring: Dan Dailey; Charles Winninger; Nancy Guild
- Cinematography: Harry Jackson
- Edited by: William Reynolds
- Music by: Lionel Newman
- Production company: 20th Century Fox
- Distributed by: 20th Century Fox
- Release date: June 22, 1948
- Running time: 88 minutes
- Country: United States
- Language: English
- Budget: $2 million.
- Box office: $2.1 million (US rentals)

Give My Regards to Broadway is a 1948 American Technicolor musical film directed by Lloyd Bacon and starring Dan Dailey, Charles Winninger, and Nancy Guild. It was produced and distributed by Hollywood studio 20th Century Fox and takes its title from the 1904 song Give My Regards to Broadway by George M. Cohan.

== Plot ==
"Albert the Great" heads up a family juggling act on the vaudeville circuit. Albert Norwick loves the life, entertaining with wife Fay, son Bert and daughters May and June, but vaudeville is a dying form of entertainment and everyone in the family is forced to find normal, everyday jobs.

Although agent Toby Helper continues to look for stage bookings, Albert has become a New Jersey company's shipping clerk. May elopes with boyfriend Frank Doty, reducing the act by one should it ever reunite. June is seeing Arthur Waldron Jr., whose father owns the firm where she works. Bert, meantime, has a good job and is more interested in playing baseball than in returning to show business.

August Dinkel offers a 16-week booking out west, out of the blue. Albert desperately wants to go, so much so that he goes to the train station alone when everyone else in the family declines. But when he hears a crowd's roar from a nearby baseball field, Albert goes to watch Bert play and realizes he and the entire family are here to stay.

== Cast ==
- Dan Dailey as Bert
- Charles Winninger as Albert
- Nancy Guild as Helen
- Charlie Ruggles as Toby
- Fay Bainter as Fay
- Jane Nigh as May
- Barbara Lawrence as June
- Georgia Caine as Mrs. Waldron
- Herbert Anderson as Frank
- Charles Russell as Arthur
- Sig Ruman as August
- Howard Freeman as Mr. Waldron
- Lela Bliss as Mrs. Boyd
- Paul Harvey as Mr. Boyd
- Pat Flaherty as Wallace
- Matt McHugh as Butch Hanratty
- Sam McDaniel as Porter
