= The Brasher Doubloon =

1947 American crime film noir by John Brahm

- Theatrical release poster
- Directed by: John Brahm
- Screenplay by: Dorothy Bennett; Leonard Praskins (adaptation)
- Based on: the novel The High Window by Raymond Chandler
- Produced by: Robert Bassler
- Starring: George Montgomery; Nancy Guild
- Cinematography: Lloyd Ahern
- Edited by: Harry Reynolds
- Music by: David Buttolph
- Color process: Black and white
- Production company: 20th Century Fox
- Distributed by: 20th Century Fox
- Release date: February 6, 1947
- Running time: 72 minutes
- Country: United States
- Language: English

The Brasher Doubloon (known in the UK as The High Window) is a 1947 American crime film noir directed by John Brahm and starring George Montgomery and Nancy Guild. It is based on the 1942 novel The High Window by Raymond Chandler.

Fred MacMurray, Victor Mature, and Dana Andrews were all mentioned at different times as having been cast as Philip Marlowe in the film before the studio settled on George Montgomery, appearing in the final film of his 20th Century Fox contract.

The High Window had already been adapted for film in 1942 as a Michael Shayne adventure starring Lloyd Nolan.

== Plot ==
Private detective Philip Marlowe is hired by wealthy widow Elizabeth Murdock to investigate the theft of a rare coin, the Brasher Doubloon, from her deceased husband's private collection. Believing the case to be a fairly routine one, Marlowe soon finds himself confronted by murder and a succession of shady characters and lethal crooks. They lead Marlowe to realise that the source of the mystery hinges upon Merle Davis, the timid and neurotic secretary of Mrs Murdock.

== Cast ==
- George Montgomery as Philip Marlowe
- Nancy Guild as Merle Davis
- Conrad Janis as Leslie Murdock
- Roy Roberts as Police Lt. Breeze
- Fritz Kortner as Rudolph Vannier
- Florence Bates as Mrs. Elizabeth Murdock
- Marvin Miller as Vince Blair
- Reed Hadley as Dr. Moss (uncredited)

== Production ==
The novel was published in 1942. The New York Times said: "Chandler has given us a detective who is hard boiled enough to be convincing without being disgustingly tough and that is no mean achievement."

Film rights were bought in May 1942 by 20th Century-Fox, who used it as the basis of a script for Time to Kill (1942), a movie in their B-picture series about Michael Shayne.

Following the success of the Chandler adaptation Murder My Sweet (1944) and Chandler's adaptation of Double Indemnity (1944), the author became in fashion in Hollywood: Warners filmed The Big Sleep, MGM did The Lady in the Lake (1946), and Paramount filmed a Chandler original, The Blue Dahlia (1946). Fox decided to film The High Window again, this time more faithfully.

In May 1945, they announced that Leonard Praskins was writing a script and Robert Bassler would produce. Fred MacMurray, who had been in Double Indemnity, would play Marlowe. In October 1945 Fox announced that John Payne would play the lead role and that filming would begin in January 1946. In December there was yet another casting change: Victor Mature was given the role. John Brahm was assigned to direct. Both Mature and Brahm were taken off Three Little Girls in Blue to do the film. In January 1946 Fox announced that the film would star Dana Andrews and Gene Tierney, who had been so successful in Laura, and that Richard Macaulay would write the script. In May 1946 Fox said that George Montgomery would play the lead and that filming would begin in July. Ida Lupino was to co-star. By June Lupino had dropped out and was replaced by Nancy Guild. At one stage, John Ireland was to be in the cast.

In July 1946 the title was changed to The Brasher Doubloon.

== Reception ==
When the film was released, the film critic for The New York Times panned the film, writing, "... Chandler's popular 'shamus' and, we might add, his efforts to recover the stolen brasher doubloon, a rare coin with a violent history, is the least of his exploits to date. Perhaps this is due equally to a pedestrian adaptation of Mr. Chandler's novel, The High Window, to the plodding and conventional direction accorded the film by John Brahm, and to the lack of conviction in George Montgomery's interpretation of Marlowe."

Film critic Dennis Schwartz, on the other hand, liked the film and wrote, "A film noir similar in theme and almost as enjoyable as The Big Sleep, as private investigator Philip Marlowe (George Montgomery) leaves his Hollywood office for a case in Pasadena from a rich old widow who lives in a dark old house. It's just smart enough of a film noir to be considered a classic... This brooding Gothic melodrama is brought to life by John Brahm's expressionistic ambiance ably photographed by cinematographer Lloyd Ahern and by the sharp hard-boiled Raymond Chandler story the film is adapted from, The High Window. The film is not as complex as the novel, but it makes good use of its snappy dialogue and has vividly grotesque characterizations to go along with the dark mood it sets. Fritz Kortner stands out in his villainous role, which he plays like Peter Lorre would; while Florence Bates is charmingly acerbic in her creepy role as a bitter old hag."
