= Lifeboat (1944 film) =

1944 American survival film by Alfred Hitchcock

- Theatrical release poster
- Directed by: Alfred Hitchcock
- Screenplay by: Jo Swerling
- Story by: John Steinbeck
- Produced by: Darryl F. Zanuck; Kenneth Macgowan
- Starring: Tallulah Bankhead; William Bendix; Walter Slezak; Mary Anderson; John Hodiak; Henry Hull; Heather Angel; Hume Cronyn; Canada Lee
- Cinematography: Glen MacWilliams
- Edited by: Dorothy Spencer
- Music by: Hugo W. Friedhofer
- Production company: 20th Century Fox
- Distributed by: 20th Century Fox
- Release date: January 12, 1944
- Running time: 97 minutes
- Country: United States
- Languages: English; German
- Budget: $1.59 million
- Box office: $1 million (rentals)

Lifeboat is a 1944 American survival film directed by Alfred Hitchcock from a story by John Steinbeck. It stars Tallulah Bankhead and William Bendix, alongside Walter Slezak, Mary Anderson, John Hodiak, Henry Hull, Heather Angel, Hume Cronyn and Canada Lee. The film is set entirely on a lifeboat launched from a freighter torpedoed and sunk by a Nazi U-boat.

The first in Hitchcock's "limited-setting" films, the others being Rope (1948), Dial M for Murder and Rear Window (both 1954), it is the only film Hitchcock made for 20th Century Fox. The film received three Oscar nominations for Best Director, Best Original Story and Best Cinematography – Black and White. Bankhead won the New York Film Critics Circle Award for Best Actress.

Though disparaged at the time of its release by a couple of influential film critics for its supposedly sympathetic depiction of a German U-boat captain, Lifeboat is now viewed more favorably and has been listed by several modern critics as one of Hitchcock's most underrated films.

== Plot ==
Eight British and American civilians, service members and United States Merchant Mariners are adrift in a lifeboat after their ship and a German U-boat sink each other in combat. Willi, a German survivor of the U-boat, is pulled aboard. Engine room crewman Kovac demands the German be thrown out to drown. The others object, with radioman Stanley, wealthy industrialist Rittenhouse and columnist Connie Porter succeeding in arguing that he be allowed to stay. Porter is thrilled at having photographed the battle, but her camera is the first of many of her possessions to be lost overboard.

Mrs. Higley, a young British woman whose infant child is dead when they are pulled from the water, must be tied down to stop her from hurting herself. She jumps overboard in Porter's mink coat while the other passengers sleep. Willi is revealed to be the U-boat captain, rather than a mere crewman.

The group attempt to organize their rations, set a course for Bermuda, and coexist as they try to survive. They cooperate to amputate the gangrenous leg of Gus Smith.

Kovac takes charge, rationing the little food and water they have, but Willi, who has been consulting a concealed compass and reveals that he speaks English, wrests control away from him in a storm.

Gus Smith, who has been drinking seawater and is hallucinating, catches Willi drinking water from a hidden flask. Gus tries to tell Stanley but Stanley doesn't believe him. While the others sleep, Willi pushes Gus over the side. Gus's calls for help rouse Stanley and the others, but it is too late.

When the group realizes that Willi does actually have a flask of water, Joe pulls it from Willi's shirt and it breaks. Willi explains that like everyone on a U-boat he had food tablets and energy pills, saying that to survive, one must have a plan. The other survivors except Joe beat Willi and toss him overboard.

Rittenhouse says that he will never understand Willi's ingratitude, musing, "What do you do with people like that?". Stanley proposes to Alice, and she accepts, although they have little hope of surviving. Connie chastises everyone for giving up, then offers her Cartier diamond bracelet as bait for fishing. A fish bites, but Joe sights a ship, and in the rush for the oars, the line goes overboard and the bracelet is lost.

The ship they have spotted is the German supply ship towards which Willi had been steering them. Before a launch can pick them up, both it and the supply ship are sunk by gunfire from a US warship and a brief battle is waged between the two which nearly destroys the lifeboat. After the battle ends, Kovac estimates that the Allied vessel will be there in twenty minutes. Connie panics over her appearance. Joe hopes his wife isn't worried. Rittenhouse admires a picture of Joe's family, though he persists in calling him "George".

A frightened, wounded young German seaman is pulled aboard the lifeboat. Rittenhouse is now all for killing him, and the others, including Kovac, have to hold him back. The German sailor pulls a gun and is disarmed by Joe. The seaman asks in German, "Aren't you going to kill me?" Kovac muses, "'Aren't you going to kill me?' What are you going to do with people like that?" Stanley says "I don't know, I was thinking of Mrs. Higley and her baby, and Gus." "Well," Connie says, "maybe they can answer that." The film ends.

== Cast ==
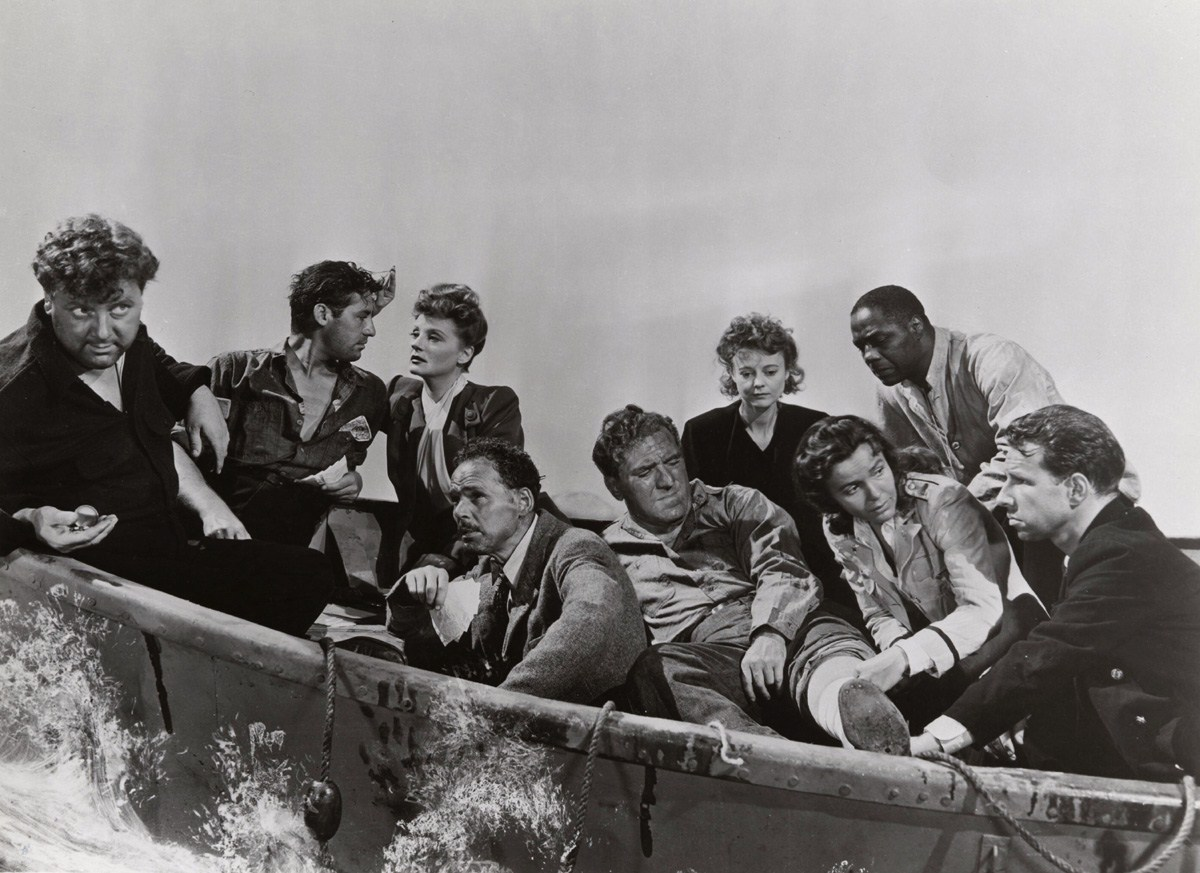
L–R: Walter Slezak, John Hodiak, Tallulah Bankhead, Henry Hull, William Bendix, Heather Angel, Mary Anderson, Canada Lee, and Hume Cronyn

- Tallulah Bankhead as Constance "Connie" Porter, columnist
- William Bendix as Gus Smith, injured man
- Walter Slezak as Kapitän Willi, German captain
- Mary Anderson as Alice MacKenzie, nurse
- John Hodiak as John Kovac, crewman
- Henry Hull as Charles J. "Ritt" Rittenhouse Jr., wealthy industrialist
- Hume Cronyn as Stanley "Sparks" Garrett, radioman
- Canada Lee as Joe Spencer, steward
- Heather Angel as Mrs. Higley, young British mother

Cast notes

- William Yetter Jr. appeared on screen in a speaking role as the German sailor but was not listed in the film's credits
- Except for a cameo appearance in Stage Door Canteen (1943), Bankhead had not appeared in a film since Faithless in 1932. She was paid US$75,000 ($1.37 million in 2025) for her work in Lifeboat.

== Production ==
At the time that Lifeboat went into production, Alfred Hitchcock was under contract to David O. Selznick. 20th Century Fox obtained the director's services in exchange for that of several actors and technicians, as well as the rights to three stories that Fox owned. Hitchcock was to direct two films for the studio, but the second was never made, apparently because Fox was unhappy with the length of time taken to finish production on Lifeboat.

It was Hitchcock who came up with the idea for the film. He approached A.J. Cronin, James Hilton, and Ernest Hemingway to help write the script before giving the project to John Steinbeck, who had previously written the screenplay for the 1941 documentary The Forgotten Village, but had not written a fictional story for the screen. It was Steinbeck's intention to write and publish a novel and sell the rights to the studio, but the story was never published because his literary agents considered it "inferior". Steinbeck received $50,000 ($985,000 in 2025) for the rights to his story. Steinbeck was unhappy with the film because it presented what he considered to be "slurs against organized labor" and a "stock comedy Negro" when his story had a "Negro of dignity, purpose and personality". He requested, unsuccessfully, that his name be removed from the credits. A short story version of Hitchcock's idea appeared in Collier's magazine on November 13, 1943. It was written by Harry Sylvester and Hitchcock, with Steinbeck credited with the "original screen story". Jo Swerling wrote the bulk of the screenplay. Other writers who worked on various drafts of the script include Hitchcock's wife Alma Reville, as well as MacKinlay Kantor, Patricia Collinge, Albert Mannheimer, and Marian Spitzer. Hitchcock also brought in Ben Hecht to rewrite the ending.

In the 1940s, African-American actor and playwright Sidney Easton sued 20th Century Fox, for having used his play, Lifeboat #13, as the basis for the film. Easton settled out of court four years later for a few thousand dollars, and relinquished the copyright to the play.

Lifeboat was originally planned to be filmed in Technicolor with an all-male cast, many of whom were going to be unknowns. Canada Lee, who was primarily a stage actor with only one film credit at the time, was the first actor cast in the film.

Hitchcock planned the camera angles for the film using a miniature lifeboat and figurines. Four lifeboats were used during shooting. Rehearsals took place in one, separate boats were used for close-ups and long shots, and another was in the studio's large-scale tank, where water shots were made. Except for background footage shot by the second unit around Miami, in the Florida Keys, and on San Miguel Island in California, the film was shot in the 20th Century Fox studio on Pico Boulevard in what is now Century City.

Lifeboat was in production from August 3 through November 17, 1943. Scenes were shot in sequence to aid character development. Illnesses were a constant part of the production from the beginning. Before shooting began, William Bendix replaced actor Murray Alper when Alper became ill. After two weeks of shooting, director of photography Arthur Miller was replaced by Glen MacWilliams because of illness. Tallulah Bankhead came down with pneumonia twice during shooting, while Mary Anderson became seriously ill during production, causing several days of production time to be lost. Hume Cronyn suffered two cracked ribs and nearly drowned when he was caught under a water-activator making waves for a storm scene. He was saved by a lifeguard.

The film has no musical score during the narrative (apart from the singing of the U-boat captain and of Gus, accompanied by flute); the Fox studio orchestra was used only for the opening and closing credits. Hitchcock dismissed the idea of having music in a film about people stranded at sea by asking, "Where would the orchestra come from?", to which musical director Hugo Friedhofer is said to have asked in reply, "Where would the cameras come from?"

=== Cameo ===
Director Alfred Hitchcock made cameo appearances in most of his films. He once commented to François Truffaut – in Hitchcock/Truffaut (Simon and Schuster, 1967) – that this particular cameo was difficult to achieve, as there are no passers-by in the film. Although he originally considered posing as a body floating past the lifeboat – an approach he later considered for his cameo in Frenzy (and used in that film's trailer) – Hitchcock was inspired by his own success with weight loss and decided to pose for "before" and "after" photos in an advertisement for a fictional weight-loss drug, "Reduco", shown in a newspaper that was in the boat. Hitchcock said that he was besieged by letters from people asking about Reduco. Hitchcock used the product again in Rope, where his profile and “Reduco” appear on a red neon sign. The Lifeboat cameo appears 25 minutes into the film.

=== Production credits ===
The production credits on the film were as follows:

- Director – Alfred Hitchcock
- Producer – Kenneth Macgowan
- Writing – John Steinbeck (story), Jo Swerling (screenplay)
- Cinematography – Glen MacWilliams (director of photography)
- Art direction – James Basevi and Maurice Ransford (art direction); Thomas Little and Frank E. Hughes (set decoration)
- Film editor – Dorothy Spencer
- Costumes – René Hubert
- Makeup artist – Guy Pearce
- Special photographic effects – Fred Sersen
- Technical adviser (maritime) – Thomas Fitzsimmons
- Sound – Bernard Freericks and Roger Heman
- Music – Hugo W. Friedhofer (music), Emil Newman (musical director)

== Reception ==
Variety praised the film upon its release, saying, "John Steinbeck‘s devastating indictment of the nature of Nazi bestiality, at times an almost clinical, dissecting room analysis, emerges as powerful adult motion picture fare. . . Hitchcock pilots the piece skillfully, ingeniously developing suspense and action. Despite that it’s a slow starter, the picture, from the beginning, leaves a strong impact and, before too long, develops into the type of suspenseful product with which Hitchcock has always been identified."

Film critic Manny Farber wrote on February 14, 1944's The New Republic: "Lifeboat is eminently theatrical, but not because it is dialogue-heavy and confined to a single set. Its theatricality lies in the fact that it is entirely an arrangement in which the audience does not, as it should, seem outside of the event, but is the main person in the boat … The event that is supposed to be taking place falls away from conviction at every point and for this reason: it simply is not taking place in a lifeboat in the middle of the ocean but right in front of you on a stage … The characters are no longer driven and provoked by the situation but by the audience." In The Nation in 1944, critic James Agee wrote, "As allegory, the film is nicely knit, extensively shaded and detailed, and often fascinating. But the allegory itself is always too carefully slide-ruled. None of it gives off the crazy, more than ambiguous, nascent-oxygen quality of first-rate allegories ... little of it effloresces into pure human or even pure theatrical emotion; it is too thought-out, too superficial, and too much in thrall to its somewhat sentimental intelligence."

While most critics applauded the film, two influential reviewers and columnists, including Dorothy Thompson and Bosley Crowther of The New York Times, saw the film as denigrating the American and British characters while glorifying the German. Crowther wrote that "the Nazis, with some cutting here and there, could turn Lifeboat into a whiplash against the 'decadent democracies.' And it is questionable whether such a picture, with such a theme, is judicious at this time." In Truffaut's 1967 book-length interview Hitchcock/Truffaut, Hitchcock paraphrased Thompson's criticism as "Dorothy Thompson gave the film ten days to get out of town."

Such commentary caused Steinbeck, who had previously been criticized because of his handling of German characters in The Moon Is Down, to publicly dissociate himself from the film, to denounce Hitchcock and Swerling's treatment of his material, and to request that his name not be used by Fox in connection with the presentation of the film. Crowther responded by detailing the differences between Steinbeck's novella and the film as released, accusing the film's creators of "pre-empting" Steinbeck's "creative authority".

Hitchcock responded to the criticism by explaining that the film's moral was that the Allies needed to stop bickering and work together to win the war, and he defended the portrayal of the German character, saying, "I always respect my villain, build[ing] him into a redoubtable character that will make my hero or thesis more admirable in defeating him or it." Bankhead backed him up in an interview in which she said that the director "wanted to teach an important lesson. He wanted to say that you can't trust the enemy... in Lifeboat you see clearly that you can't trust a Nazi, no matter how nice he seems to be." She also called the criticism leveled at the film that it was too pro-Axis "moronic".

Criticism was also leveled at the script for its portrayal of the African-American character Joe as "too stereotypical". Actor Canada Lee testified that he had attempted to round out the character by revising dialogue, primarily eliminating repeated "yessir"s and "nossir"s that sounded subservient, and cutting some actions. The overseas section of the Office of War Information's Bureau of Motion Pictures reviewed the picture and for these and other racial characterizations recommended that Lifeboat not be distributed overseas. An NAACP critique of the film condemned Lee's role unequivocally although praising his performance. However the Baltimore Afro-American's review, while commenting on shortcomings regarding the character, praised both the performance and its role depiction. Historian Rebecca Sklaroff, while writing that Joe's role was more "tokenistic" than black roles in the wartime films Sahara and Bataan, noted that Joe was also depicted as compassionate, dependable, and heroic, the only cast member stepping forward to disarm the second German sailor rescued.

Critics praised the film's acting, directing, and cinematography and noted with appreciation the lack of background music once the film proper begins. Still, studio executives, under pressure because of the controversies, decided to give the film a limited release instead of the wide release most of Hitchcock's films received. Advertising for the film was also reduced, which resulted in the film's poor box office showing when it was released in 1944.

On the review aggregator website Rotten Tomatoes, 90% of 31 critics' reviews are positive. The website's consensus reads: "Hitchcock proves he can wring suspense from the most confined of settings aboard a raft teeming with vivid personalities in this maritime thriller." On Metacritic, the film has a weighted average score of 78 out of 100 based on 13 critics, which the site labels as "generally favorable" reviews.

=== Awards and honors ===
Award	Category	Subject	Result
Academy Awards	Best Director	Alfred Hitchcock	Nominated
Academy Awards	Best Story	John Steinbeck	Nominated
Academy Awards	Best Cinematography	Glen MacWilliams	Nominated
National Board of Review Award	Top Ten Films		Won
NYFCC Award	Best Actress	Tallulah Bankhead	Won
Saturn Award	Best Classic Film DVD Release		Won

== Adaptations ==
NBC broadcast a one-hour radio adaptation of the film on Screen Directors Playhouse on November 16, 1950. Hitchcock directed, and Bankhead reprised her role from the film. The cast also featured Jeff Chandler and Sheldon Leonard.

In 1993, Lifeboat was remade as a science fiction TV movie under the title Lifepod. Moving the action from a lifeboat to a spaceship's escape capsule in the year 2169, the remake starred Ron Silver, who also directed, Robert Loggia, and CCH Pounder. The film was aired on the Fox channel in the United States. The film credited Hitchcock and Harry Sylvester for the story.

== See also ==
- List of American films of 1944

== Sources ==
- Farber, Manny. 2009. Farber on Film: The Complete Film Writings of Manny Farber. Edited by Robert Polito. Library of America. ISBN 978-1-59853-050-6
- Federle, Steven J. "Lifeboat as Allegory: Steinbeck and the Demon of War." Steinbeck Quarterly 12.01-02 (Winter/Spring 1979): 14–20
- "Lifeboat". Variety. 1943-12-31.
- Richman, Darren (2018-03-14). "Movies You Might Have Missed: Alfred Hitchcock's Lifeboat". The Independent.
