= The High Window =

Novel by Raymond Chandler

- Cover of the first edition
- Author: Raymond Chandler
- Cover artist: Hans J. Barschel
- Language: English
- Series: Philip Marlowe
- Genre: Detective fiction, hardboiled, noir fiction
- Set in: Los Angeles and Pasadena, 1941
- Publisher: Alfred A. Knopf
- Publication date: 1942
- Publication place: United States
- Media type: Print (Hardcover)
- Pages: 240 pp
- OCLC: 1205243
- Dewey Decimal: 813/.52 19
- LC Class: PS3505.H3224 H5
- Preceded by: Farewell, My Lovely
- Followed by: The Lady in the Lake

The High Window is a 1942 novel written by Raymond Chandler. It is his third novel featuring the Los Angeles private detective Philip Marlowe.

== Plot ==
Private detective Philip Marlowe is hired by wealthy widow Elizabeth Bright Murdock to recover a missing Brasher Doubloon, a rare and valuable coin. Mrs. Murdock suspects it was stolen by her son's estranged wife, former singer Linda Conquest. Returning to his office, Marlowe is followed by a blond man in a coupe.

Mrs. Murdock's son Leslie visits Marlowe and tries to learn why his mother hired him. He reveals that he owes nightclub owner Alex Morny a large sum of money. Marlowe learns that Linda had two friends: Lois Magic and a Mr. Vannier; Magic is now married to Morny. Marlowe visits Mrs. Morny at home and finds her with Vannier, who acts suspiciously. He is again tailed by the blond in the coupe and confronts him. The man identifies himself as George Anson Phillips, an amateurish private detective, who wants to enlist Marlowe's help on a case he cannot handle. Marlowe agrees to meet him at his apartment later.

Marlowe visits a rare coin dealer, Mr. Morningstar, who confirms that someone tried to sell him a Brasher Doubloon. Marlowe agrees to buy it back the next day, and after leaving overhears Morningstar trying to call Phillips. Marlowe keeps his appointment with Phillips but finds him dead. Police arrest the drunk next door for the murder and give Marlowe an ultimatum to reveal all he knows.

Marlowe receives an unaddressed package containing the coin. He calls Mrs. Murdock, but she claims the coin has already been returned to her. Marlowe returns to Morningstar and finds him dead. Morny's henchman invites Marlowe to visit Morny at his nightclub, where Linda is singing. Morny demands to know why Marlowe visited his wife, but eventually realizes he is not Marlowe's quarry. Morny offers to hire Marlowe to investigate Vannier, giving him a suspicious receipt for dentistry chemicals that Vannier lost. Marlowe also talks to Linda and decides she is probably not involved in the theft.

Returning to the Murdocks, Marlowe is told a story he doesn’t believe: Leslie gave the coin to Morny to secure his debts, then changed his mind and retrieved it. Marlowe leaves, beginning to suspect a dark secret involving Merle, the timid family secretary, and Mrs. Murdock's first husband, Horace Bright, who died falling out of a window. The police say the drunk has confessed to the murder of Phillips, but Marlowe discovers he is covering for his landlord and is unlikely to be the real murderer.

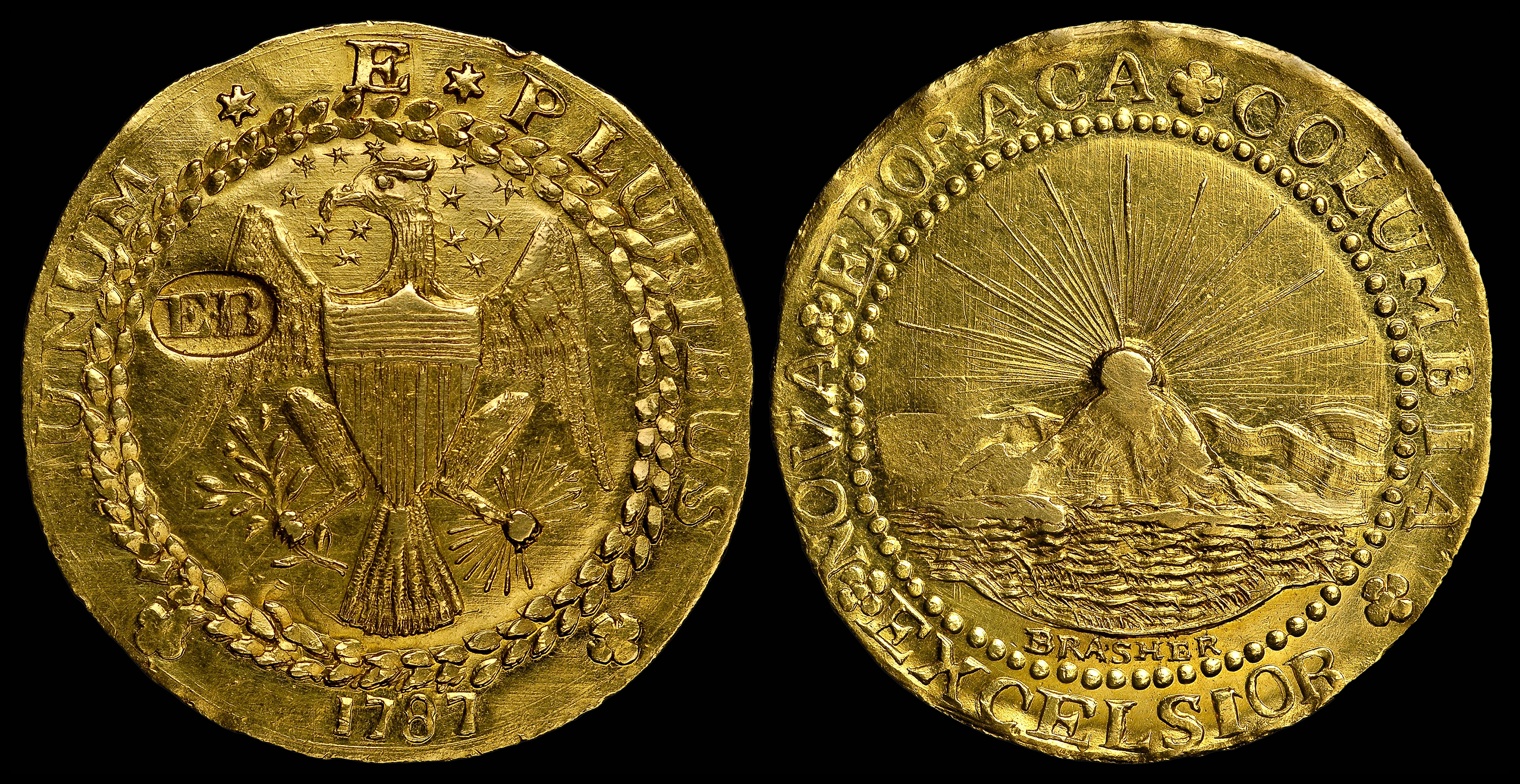
A 1787 Brasher Doubloon, the same type featured in The High Window

Merle arrives at Marlowe's apartment having a nervous breakdown. She claims to have shot Vannier, although her story doesn’t make sense. Marlowe visits Vannier's home, finds him dead and discovers a photo of a man falling from a window with a woman behind him. Morny and Magic arrive, and Marlowe hides while Morny tricks his wife into leaving her fingerprints on the gun near the body to incriminate her. After they leave, Marlowe puts the dead man's prints on the gun instead.

Marlowe visits Mrs. Murdock and tells her he has figured out that Bright once tried to force himself on Merle, and she either pushed him or allowed him to fall out of a window to his death. Vannier knew this and was blackmailing the family. Mrs. Murdock says Marlowe is right and that she regrets ever hiring him. Marlowe then confronts Leslie, revealing that he knew Leslie and Vannier had a plot to duplicate the coin using dental technology. They had Magic hire Phillips to sell the fakes, but Phillips was frightened by the assignment and mailed the coin to Marlowe. Vannier killed Phillips and Morningstar to cover his tracks. Leslie then killed Vannier when he threatened to ruin Leslie if their scheme ever got out. Leslie confirms the plot, but Marlowe declines to turn him in. The police discover Vannier's role in the counterfeiting and the murders of Phillips and Morningstar, but they rule his death a suicide.

Marlowe shows Merle the photograph of Bright being pushed out the window, which shows it was actually Mrs. Murdock who killed her husband and then blamed Merle for it. Marlowe drives her cross country, to the home of her parents, safely away from Mrs. Murdock. He watches her and her family as he drives away and says, "I had a funny feeling as I saw the house disappear, as though I had written a poem and it was very good and I had lost it and would never remember it again."

== Themes ==
One of the themes of Chandler's novels that differentiate Philip Marlowe from his hardboiled colleagues is that in spite of his cynicism, Marlowe exhibits the idealism of a Romantic hero. Nowhere is this more evident than in The High Window, in which Marlowe rescues a damsel in distress in the form of Merle. Chandler hints at the theme of Marlowe as a romantic knight in the language he uses in the novel to describe Marlowe, such as "shop-soiled Sir Galahad".

Chandler often wrote about corruption in high places. The "Cassidy Case", which Marlowe relates to Breeze in chapter 15, is actually a retelling of the real-life murder in Los Angeles of Ned Doheny, son of oil tycoon Edward Doheny.

== Adaptations ==
=== Film ===
Two film adaptations of the novel have been made:

- Time to Kill (1942), re-written to feature the series character Michael Shayne (played by Lloyd Nolan) directed by Herbert I. Leeds
- The Brasher Doubloon (1947), directed by John Brahm and starring George Montgomery as Marlowe

=== Radio ===
Two radio adaptations of the novel have been made, as well:

- 17 October 1977 on BBC Radio 4, adapted by Bill Morrison, directed by John Tydeman, and starring Ed Bishop as Marlowe
- 8 October 2011, also on BBC Radio 4, dramatized by Robin Brooks, directed by Sasha Yevtushenko, and starring Toby Stephens; it is available on CD
