= Behind Green Lights =

1946 film by Otto Brower

- Theatrical release poster
- Directed by: Otto Brower
- Written by: Charles G. Booth; Scott Darling
- Produced by: Robert Bassler
- Starring: Carole Landis; William Gargan; Mary Anderson
- Cinematography: Joseph MacDonald
- Edited by: Stanley Rabjohn
- Music by: Emil Newman
- Production company: 20th Century Fox
- Distributed by: 20th Century Fox
- Release date: February 15, 1946
- Running time: 94 minutes
- Country: United States
- Language: English

Behind Green Lights

Behind Green Lights is a 1946 American crime film directed by Otto Brower and starring Carole Landis, William Gargan and Mary Anderson. It was produced and distributed by Twentieth Century Fox.

== Plot ==
Police Lieutenant Sam Carson spots Walter Bard's bullet-ridden corpse in a car brazenly left in front of the police station. Carson questions Janet Bradley after finding her name in the dead man's appointment book. She admits that Bard had been blackmailing her friend for $20,000, and that she went to see him, though she had been able to raise only half the money. When he refused to settle for that, she claims she took what she came for at gunpoint. Max Calvert, a newspaper owner, pressures Carson to arrest Bradley to hurt her father's election campaign for mayor. Carson declines.

When Dr. Yager, the corrupt medical examiner, informs Calvert that Bard actually died from poison, Calvert orders him to get the body out of the police station and substitute another corpse for it before anyone else finds out.

Meanwhile, Carson interviews Bard's estranged wife, Nora, who is accompanied by her lawyer and boyfriend, Arthur Templeton.

Complications ensue when a prisoner pulls his own switch, taking the place of Bard's body to escape from the police station in an ambulance. Johnny Williams, the new reporter on the police beat, finds the missing body in a closet. He gets a scoop for his newspaper, and Carson gets his corpse back. The lieutenant notices there is very little blood for a fatal gunshot, so he orders another autopsy, by someone other than Yager.

Then Nora Bard and Arthur Templeton voluntarily confess to him that they lied before. Nora was in her husband's apartment when he died. She had gone to plead for a divorce, and hid in another room when Janet Bradley arrived. After Janet left, Nora found Walter dying after drinking some liquor. When she ran out, she was seen by Templeton. He went into the apartment, assumed Nora had committed the crime, and staged the fake suicide to protect her.

Noticing a fresh flower among Bard's effects, Carson questions flower seller Flossie. She mentions that when she went to try to collect what Bard owed her, she saw Yager unlock and enter Bard's apartment. Carson confronts Yager. Knowing that Bard had been investigating Yager for a malpractice suit, the policeman guesses that Yager stole the evidence Bard had found and poisoned the liquor. Yager makes a break for it, but is caught. At Detective Oppenheimer's suggestion, Carson then takes Janet Bradley out.

Bard's appointment book showed he had an appointment with Janet Bradley on January 17 10:30 PM

A scene later in the police headquarters shows a paper wall calendar with a date of “21”.

== Cast ==
- Carole Landis as Janet Bradley
- William Gargan as Lt. Sam Carson
- Don Beddoe as Dr. Yager, Medical Examiner
- Richard Crane as Johnny Williams, Reporter
- Mary Anderson as Nora Bard
- John Ireland as Det. Oppenheimer
- Charles Russell as Arthur Templeton
- Roy Roberts as Max Calvert
- Mabel Paige as Flossie
- Stanley Prager as Ruzinsky, Milkman
- Charles Tannen as Ames, Reporter

== Bibliography ==
- Tsika, Noah. Screening the Police: Film and Law Enforcement in the United States. Oxford University Press, 2021.
