= Somewhere in the Night (film) =

1946 film by Joseph L. Mankiewicz

- Theatrical release poster
- Directed by: Joseph L. Mankiewicz
- Screenplay by: Howard Dimsdale; Joseph L. Mankiewicz; Lee Strasberg (adaptation)
- Story by: Marvin Borowsky
- Produced by: Anderson Lawler
- Starring: John Hodiak; Nancy Guild
- Cinematography: Norbert Brodine
- Edited by: James B. Clark
- Music by: David Buttolph
- Production company: 20th Century-Fox
- Distributed by: 20th Century-Fox
- Release date: June 12, 1946
- Running time: 110 minutes
- Country: United States
- Language: English
- Box office: $1.5 million

Somewhere in the Night is a 1946 American film noir psychological thriller film directed by Joseph L. Mankiewicz, written by Mankiewicz with Howard Dimsdale and Lee Strasberg based on a short story by Marvin Borowsky. It stars John Hodiak, Nancy Guild, Lloyd Nolan and Richard Conte.

== Plot ==
In the final weeks of World War II, a severely wounded man awakens with amnesia in a U.S. military field hospital. As he recovers, he learns that he is George W. Taylor, a Marine. Among Taylor's personal items is an unsigned letter in which the writer curses him for an unspecified wrong. Taylor decides to hide his amnesia and uncover his original identity.

Returning home to Los Angeles, Taylor finds a note in his old briefcase advising him that a bank account had been opened in his name by someone named Larry Cravat. Taylor's search for Cravat takes him to a nightclub called The Cellar. As Taylor inquires for Cravat among the clientele, he is noticed by two thugs and evades them by hiding in the dressing room of singer Christy Smith. There, he finds a postcard directed to her from a woman named Mary announcing her impending marriage to Cravat. Taylor steals the postcard and slips out the window.

Taylor later returns to The Cellar on a tip from the bartender, who claimed to have information about Cravat, but he is ambushed by the thugs. Taylor is brutally interrogated by a gangster named Anzelmo to divulge Cravat's location, then deposited at the address on the postcard, Christy's apartment. While there, Taylor asks Christy about Mary, whom he assumes is Cravat's wife. Christy relates that Cravat left Mary at the altar, and she subsequently died in a street accident. Taylor confides in Christy about his amnesia.

Christy introduces Taylor to Mel Phillips, owner of The Cellar, who arranges a meeting with police lieutenant Donald Kendall to discuss Cravat. Taylor assumes a pseudonym for the meeting to protect his identity. Kendall reveals that years ago, a Nazi official who planned to defect sent $2 million in cash to the U.S. for safekeeping, but he was executed before he could escape Germany. The money was in large denomination bills that could not be spent or exchanged without attracting government attention, so it changed hands many times until it was brought to Los Angeles in December 1942. Cravat, a private detective at the time, is alleged to have stolen the money and murdered its carrier before vanishing. Kendall also notes that the police want to question Taylor because his recent activities have revived the Cravat case.

A note left on Christy's car leads Taylor to Terminal Dock and a fortune teller whom he recognizes as Anzelmo. Also hunting for Cravat and the $2 million, Anzelmo shares that the money's original carrier was a man named Steele who was murdered at the dock. The crime was witnessed by a dockworker named Michael Conroy, who saw a third man with Cravat and Steele. Anzelmo accuses Taylor of being the third man and threatens to frame him as the killer unless Taylor helps him meet Cravat. Taylor tracks Conroy to a sanatorium, where he finds the witness dying of a stab wound. Conroy discloses that after the Steele murder, he found a suitcase that had been left behind and hid it under Terminal Dock, but he dies before he can name the suitcase's owner and Steele's killer.

Taylor becomes wanted by the police for the murder of Conroy. Taylor and Christy drive to Terminal Dock to retrieve the suitcase. They find the $2 million intact and clothing with labels bearing the name of Larry Cravat. Taylor realizes that he is Cravat, and that after the Steele murder, he must have assumed a new identity and enlisted in the Marines to hide. He shows the unsigned letter to Christy, who verifies that it was written by Mary after Cravat abandoned her. Taylor and Christy are shot at by an unseen assailant and take refuge in a soup kitchen. Taylor has the soup kitchen's manager take the suitcase to Kendall.

Anzelmo has Taylor and Christy brought before him and demands to meet Cravat, but Phillips arrives and helps the pair escape with him to The Cellar. Taylor realizes that Phillips is Steele's murderer, and Phillips admits it and clarifies what had happened in 1942. Steele had struck a deal with Phillips to launder the Nazi money, but Cravat learned of the exchange, pretended to be Phillips, and took the money from Steele. Phillips found Steele empty-handed and shot him, believing that he had been cheated, but then noticed Cravat running away and deduced that Cravat had the money. Phillips also had Conroy killed and hired the gunman at the dock to follow Taylor. To protect Christy, Taylor offers to show Philips where the money is stashed and leads him to the soup kitchen. Once there, Kendall appears, having placed the soup kitchen under surveillance after receiving the suitcase, and shoots Phillips to disarm him. Phillips is hospitalized and makes a full confession to the police, and Anzelmo's crew is arrested. Taylor and Christy start a new life together.

== Cast ==
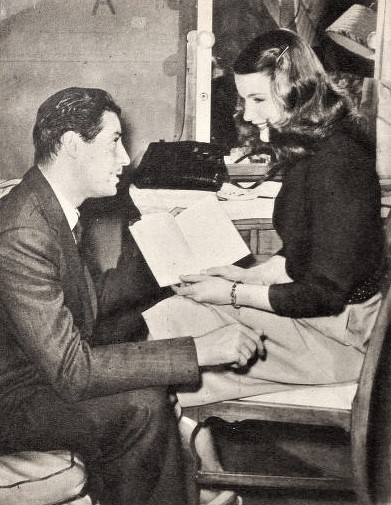
Hodiak and Guild

- John Hodiak as George W. Taylor
- Nancy Guild as Christy Smith
- Lloyd Nolan as Police Lt. Donald Kendall
- Richard Conte as Mel Phillips
- Josephine Hutchinson as Elizabeth Conroy
- Fritz Kortner as Anzelmo, aka Dr. Oracle
- Margo Woode as Phyllis
- Sheldon Leonard as Sam
- Lou Nova as Hubert
- Whit Bissel as John the bartender (uncredited)
- Harry Morgan as bathhouse keeper (uncredited)

== Production ==
20th Century-Fox purchased Marvin Borowsky's original, unpublished story "The Lonely Journey" and his accompanying screenplay in December 1944 for $11,000. Somewhere in the Night was Nancy Guild's first film.

The film was in production from November 21, 1945, until January 24, 1946.

A radio version of the film starring John Hodiak and Lynn Bari was broadcast on Lux Radio Theatre on March 3, 1947.

== Reception ==
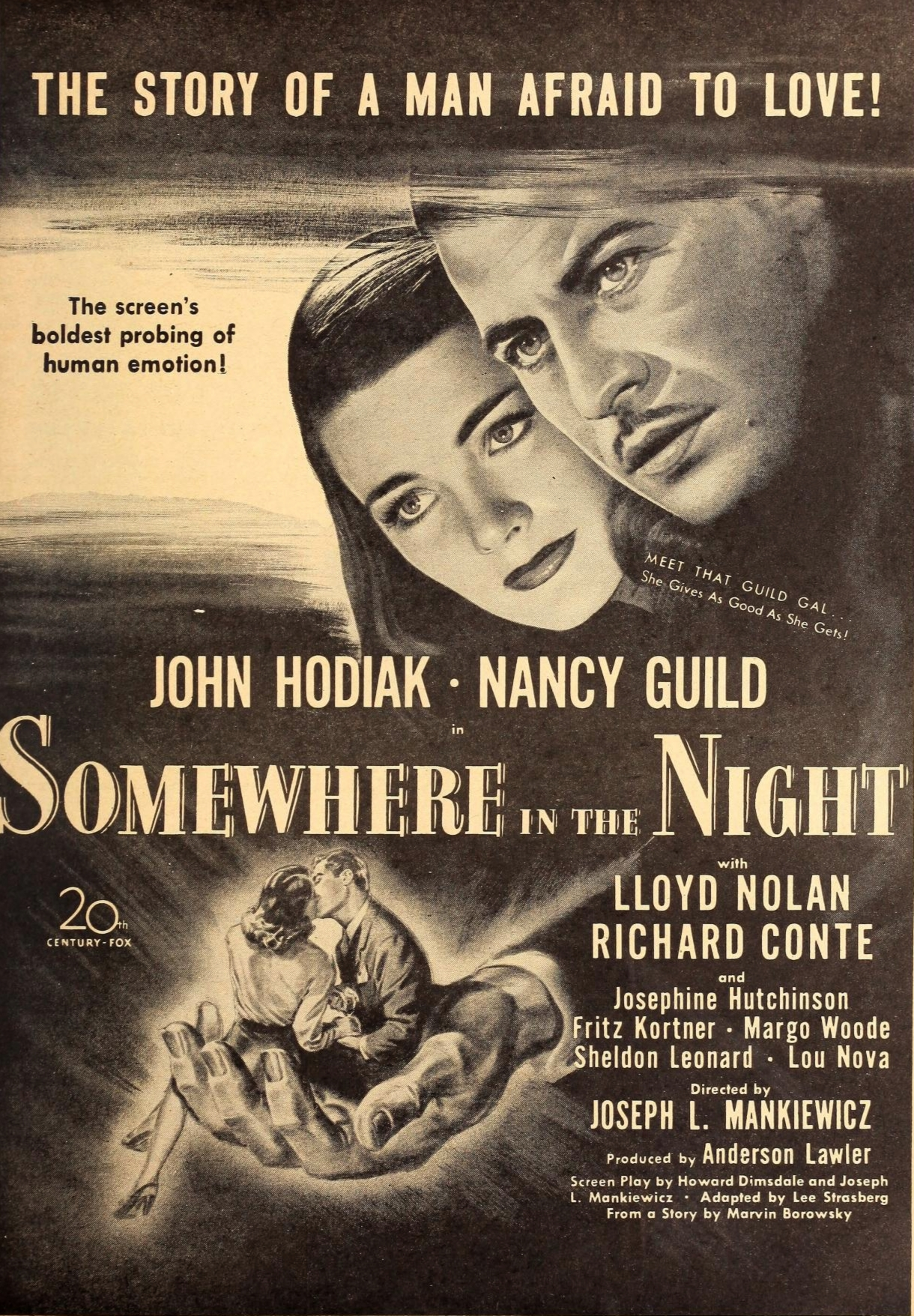
Magazine advertisement

In a contemporary review for The New York Times, critic Bosley Crowther wrote:

As a straight piece of melodramatic staging, this Twentieth Century-Fox film is all right. But the story is a large-sized slice of hokum, starting off with the proposition that a veteran would be released from a naval hospital suffering from amnesia. And from this dubious point of departure, the yarn throws logic to the whistling winds as it recounts this veteran's grim endeavors to find out who he is. Assuming that such a man would bother to endure the harsh resistance that he does, immediately he starts out to follow a thin trail of self-revealing clues, the likelihood of such titanic mysteries in re his person seems logically remote. However, the greatest indifference of the writers appears to have been toward a reasonable clarification of the progressively complicated plot. The further this unremembering gentleman pursues his mysterious past and confronts various odd and brutal characters, the more he—and you—become confused. Apparently he and his associates fit the pieces together in the end, but this writer is still completely baffled. Who was who, and who got shot?

Writing in 1979's Film Noir: An Encyclopedic Reference to the American Style, film scholar Robert Porfirio called Somewhere in the Night, "the quintessential film whose protagonist is an amnesiac veteran."
