= Inner Sanctum (1948 film) =

1948 film by Lew Landers

- Original film poster
- Directed by: Lew Landers
- Screenplay by: Jerome T. Gollard (as Jerome Todd Gollard)
- Produced by: Samuel Rheiner; Walter Shenson
- Starring: Charles Russell; Mary Beth Hughes
- Cinematography: Allen G. Siegler
- Edited by: Fred R. Feitshans Jr.
- Music by: Leon Klatzkin
- Color process: Black and white
- Production company: M.R.S. Pictures Inc.
- Distributed by: Film Classics
- Release date: October 15, 1948
- Running time: 62 minutes
- Country: United States
- Language: English

Inner Sanctum is a 1948 American horror mystery film directed by Lew Landers and starring Charles Russell and Mary Beth Hughes. based on the Simon & Schuster book series of the same name and the Inner Sanctum Mystery radio series. A previous film series of the show had been produced by Universal Pictures until 1945. It is the first and only film of M.R.S. productions, the initials of Richard B. Morros, Samuel Rheiner and Walter Shenson.

== Plot ==
A murderer is on the run and hiding out in a small town. As the story progresses, a boy who is sharing his room with the stranger realises he has witnessed the man killing a woman.

The story begins on a train at night where an elegantly dressed woman meets another passenger, a mysterious stranger. She is fascinated when he is able to predict every shake and bump of the train, and every flickering moment of darkness, an instant before they occur, although he claims he has never ridden on this train before. He is evidently gifted with some sort of second sight. He offers to tell her a story about events that began at some unspecified time at the next station.

The scene then shifts to acting out this narrative, which starts with Harold Dunlap inadvertently killing a woman with whom he has had a violent fight on the station platform. He places her body on the open rear end of a departing train and then goes in search of a boarding house where he can hide out for a time. There he encounters a young woman, Jean Maxwell, with whom he appears to fall in love, and the young boy who saw him at the station. He attempts to silence the boy, but is revealed as the murderer when the boy is rescued. Resigned to his fate, Harold waits with Jean until the police arrive to arrest him.

After the film returns to the present, it is revealed that the mysterious stranger has an immediate and compelling interest in telling the story, and warns the woman not to get off the train when it stops. Instead, she spots her former fiancé and leaves the train, where they fight and he kills her, revealing that she was the murder victim of the stranger's story.

== Cast ==
- Charles Russell as Harold Dunlap
- Mary Beth Hughes as Jean Maxwell
- Billy House as McFee
- Dale Belding as Mike Bennett
- Fritz Leiber, Sr. as Doctor Valonius
- Nana Bryant as Mrs. Mitchell
- Lee Patrick as Ruth Bennett
- Roscoe Ates as Willie
- Eddie Parks as Barney
- Eve Miller as Marie Kembar

== Preservation ==
Inner Sanctum was preserved and restored by the UCLA Film and Television Archive. Restoration provided by The Packard Humanities Institute. The restoration premiered at the UCLA Festival of Preservation in 2022.
