= Yvette Dugay =

American actress

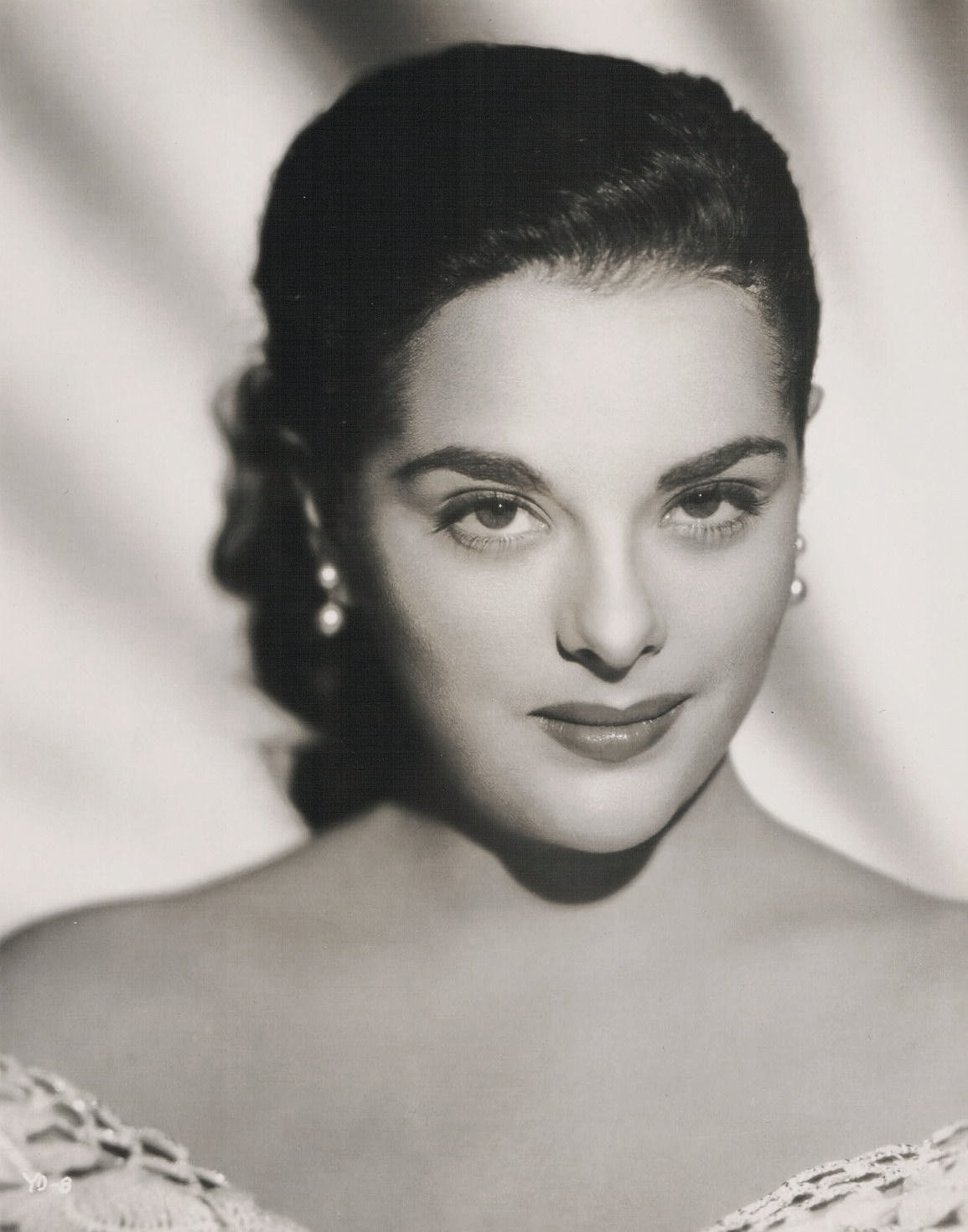
- Yvette Dugay
- Born: Audrey Lee Pearlman; June 24, 1932; Paterson, New Jersey
- Died: October 14, 1986 (aged 54); Los Angeles, California
- Other name: Yvette Duguay
- Occupation: Actress

Yvette Dugay (born Audrey Lee Pearlman; June 24, 1932 – October 14, 1986) was an American actress. She was often credited as Yvette Duguay.

== Early years ==
Dugay was born in Paterson, New Jersey, the daughter of Mr. and Mrs. William Pearlman. She began acting at the age of six months, and continued her career well into adulthood, proving to be one of the few child stars of the time to maintain a successful career.

Duguay’s family reportedly originated in Marseilles, France, as wine merchants. (Note: Dugay's page on the Glamour Girls of the Silver Screen website says that she was "born in Marseilles, France" and "brought to Paterson, New Jersey, during infancy".) (Note: Similarly, an International News Service article, published in 1951, says, "Yvette was born in Marseilles, France. Her parents ... brought their child to Paterson, N.J., when she was a baby.") Her family decided to move to Hollywood when Duguay was two years old, (Note: An article in the Wisconsin Jewish Chronicle says, "Yvette's parents brought her to Hollywood at the ripe old age of eight ...",) where she lived for her entire life. Dugay graduated from Hollywood High School in 1950.

== Career ==
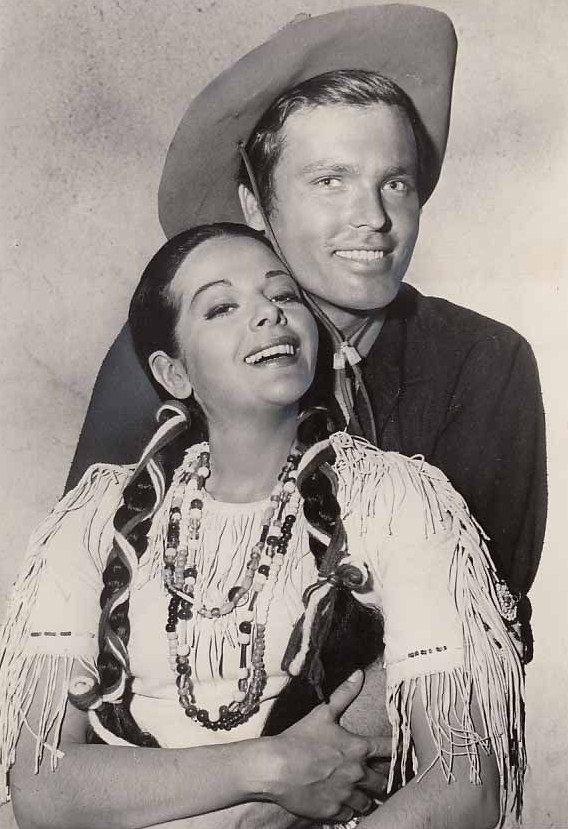
With Ty Hardin in Bronco

Director Arthur Lubin once described Dugay as "a rare actress with a bottomless well of emotion." Her filmography spans 40 years. Her career began when she was only six months old, modeling for baby talcum powder. She made her Broadway debut at age seven in a play starring Walter Huston. Duguay began spelling her name Dugay around the age of 12, about the time that she landed the role of a young Maria Montez in Ali Baba and the Forty Thieves (1944). She was typecast as being able to play exotic-looking characters from an early age.

Universal Pictures signed Duguay in July, 1951 when at age nineteen, earning her a weekly salary of $1,250. (Note: A newspaper article published on July 3, 1951, says that Dugay's salary was "$250 weekly".) She portrayed a Native American woman, Starfire, in the Western film Cattle Queen of Montana (1954) that starred Barbara Stanwyck and Ronald Reagan. Cattle Queen turned out to be one of her most recognizable roles. Duguay also portrayed a Native American character, Minnehaha, in another film, Hiawatha (1952), in which she starred opposite Vince Edwards.

Her other credits include The Great Caruso (1951) starring Mario Lanza, the film noir The People Against O'Hara (1951), opposite Spencer Tracy and James Arness, The Cimarron Kid (1952), Francis Covers the Big Town (1953), and "The Zorro" as Mariana The Domino Kid (1957).

She also played a Native American woman in an episode of Bronco (1959), a Warner Bros. television series starring Ty Hardin. Her last role was playing the Lone Woman in 1960 on the series Cheyenne.

== Death ==
Dugay died of bladder cancer in Marina del Rey, California, United States, on October 14, 1986, at the age of 54. She was cremated at Angeles Abbey in Compton, California, through the Neptune Society; her ashes are in an unknown location.
