= One Big Affair =

1952 film by Peter Godfrey

- Directed by: Peter Godfrey
- Screenplay by: Leo Townsend
- Adaptation by: Francis Swann
- Story by: George Bricker
- Produced by: Benedict Bogeaus
- Starring: Evelyn Keyes; Dennis O'Keefe; Mary Anderson; Connie Gilchrist; Thurston Hall; Gus Schilling
- Cinematography: José Ortiz Ramos
- Edited by: George Crone
- Music by: Luis Hernández Bretón
- Production company: Benedict Bogeaus Productions
- Distributed by: United Artists
- Release date: February 22, 1952
- Running time: 80 minutes
- Country: United States
- Language: English

One Big Affair is a 1952 American comedy film directed by Peter Godfrey and written by Leo Townsend and Francis Swann. The film stars Evelyn Keyes, Dennis O'Keefe, Mary Anderson, Connie Gilchrist, Thurston Hall and Gus Schilling. The film was released on February 22, 1952 by United Artists.

== Plot ==
A teacher from Pomona, California and two friends are vacationing in Mexico. By lingering too long in a Mexico City gift shop, Jean Harper accidentally gets left behind.

Jimmy Donovan, a lawyer from the U.S., is on his way to Acapulco to handle the divorce of a wealthy woman, her fifth. He decides to ride a bicycle from Mexico City and ends up encountering Jean, whose friends and tour guide fear she's a kidnap victim.

Jean tags along on the bike, hearing the kidnap report on the radio but not telling Jimmy about it. When police confront him, Jimmy and Jean pretend to be newlyweds and take the bridal suite when the cops keep observing them. An orphan boy, Juanito, befriends them and wants to be adopted. He eventually gets his wish when Jimmy and Jean straighten things out.

== Cast ==
- Evelyn Keyes as Jean Harper
- Dennis O'Keefe as Jimmy Donovan
- Mary Anderson as Hilda Jones
- Connie Gilchrist as Miss Marple
- Thurston Hall as Mr. 'G'
- Gus Schilling as Mr. Rush
- José Torvay as Charcoal Wagon Driver
- Charles Musqued as Police Chief
- Andrés Velázquez as Orphan Boy
