= Time to Kill (1942 film) =

American 1942 film

- Directed by: Herbert I. Leeds
- Written by: Brett Halliday (characters)
- Screenplay by: Clarence Upson Young
- Based on: The High Window; 1942 novel by Raymond Chandler
- Produced by: Sol M. Wurtzel
- Starring: Lloyd Nolan; Heather Angel
- Cinematography: Charles Clarke
- Edited by: Alfred Day
- Music by: Emil Newman; Cyril J. Mockridge (uncredited); David Raksin (uncredited)
- Production company: 20th Century-Fox
- Distributed by: 20th Century-Fox
- Release dates: December 24, 1942 (New York City); January 22, 1943 (United States)
- Running time: 61 minutes
- Country: United States
- Language: English

Time to Kill is a 1942 American mystery film directed by Herbert I. Leeds. It is the first screen adaptation of Raymond Chandler's novel The High Window, which was remade five years later as The Brasher Doubloon. The detective was changed from Philip Marlowe to Michael Shayne for this version, with Lloyd Nolan playing the part and Heather Angel in a rare turn as leading lady. This was the first notable appearance in Doris Merrick's film career, as she had been uncredited or played bit parts up until this. She played Linda Conquest Murdock here. It is also the final Michael Shayne film starring Lloyd Nolan made at Fox, who closed down their popular B movie unit which included Mr. Moto, Charlie Chan, and the Cisco Kid. In 1946 the series would be reborn at Producers Releasing Corporation with Hugh Beaumont taking over the role.

== Plot ==
Private detective Michael Shayne is hired to retrieve a valuable antique coin that was stolen from a wealthy old dowager, Mrs. Murdock, She is convinced her daughter-in-law has stolen the coin but Shayne soon finds himself up to his ears in cover-ups, fights, blackmail and multiple murders. As he stumbles his way into and out of evidence, gangsters and romance he uncovers a gang of counterfeiters and a surfeit of phony coins.

== Cast ==
In order of billing:

- Lloyd Nolan as Michael Shayne
- Heather Angel as Myrle Davis
- Doris Merrick as Linda Conquest Murdock
- Ralph Byrd as Lou Venter, bodyguard
- Richard Lane as Lt. Breeze
- Sheila Bromley as Lois Morny
- Morris Ankrum as Alexander Morny
- Ethel Griffies as Mrs. Murdock
- James Seay as Leslie Murdock
- Ted Hecht as George Anson Phillips
- William Pawley as Mr. Hensch
- Syd Saylor as The Mailman
- Lester Sharpe as Elisha Washburn
- Charles Williams as The Dentist
- LeRoy Mason as Rudolph, the headwaiter
- George Melford as Minor Role (uncredited)

== Production ==
=== Rights ===
20th Century Fox bought Raymond Chandler's novel The High Window for $3,500. RKO Pictures purchased the rights to Chandler's 1940 novel Farewell, My Lovely and made 1944's Murder, My Sweet which would have the character of Philip Marlowe.

=== Score ===
David Raksin was uncredited for his work on Time to Kill although the book Film Composers in America : A Filmography, 1911-1970 credits him. Emil Newman is credited with the film score of Superior "Michael Shayne" thrillers: Murders surround theft of valuable coin.

=== Screenplay ===
Time to Kill was written by Clarence Upson Young, based on Raymond Chandler's novel The High Window. Brett Halliday wrote a series of books with Michael Shayne as the lead character whereas Chandler's was Philip Marlowe. 20th Century Fox was looking for detective film series after the success of Charlie Chan and Mr. Moto film series in 1940.

=== Cinematography ===
Time to Kill's cinematographer was Charles Clarke.

== Reception ==
=== Critical response ===
In 1978's The Detective in Hollywood by Jon Tuska claimed it "is in every way superior to the later remake, The Brasher Doubloon".
