= Trouble Preferred =

1948 film by James Tinling

- Directed by: James Tinling
- Screenplay by: Arnold Belgard
- Produced by: Sol M. Wurtzel
- Starring: Peggy Knudsen; Lynne Roberts; Charles Russell; Paul Langton; Marcia Mae Jones; Mary Bear
- Cinematography: Benjamin H. Kline
- Edited by: Roy V. Livingston
- Music by: Lucien Cailliet
- Production company: 20th Century Fox
- Distributed by: 20th Century Fox
- Release date: December 31, 1948
- Running time: 63 minutes
- Country: United States
- Language: English

Trouble Preferred is a 1948 American thriller film directed by James Tinling, written by Arnold Belgard, and starring Peggy Knudsen, Lynne Roberts, Charles Russell, Paul Langton, Marcia Mae Jones and Mary Bear. It was released on December 31, 1948, by 20th Century Fox.

== Plot ==
Two rookie policewomen investigate a woman's apparent suicide attempt.

== Cast ==
- Peggy Knudsen as Dale Kent
- Lynne Roberts as Madge Walker
- Charles Russell as Lt. Rod Brooks
- Paul Langton as Ed Poole
- Marcia Mae Jones as Virginia Evans
- Mary Bear as Sgt. Hazel Craine
- James Cardwell as Hal 'Tuffy' Tucker
- June Storey as Hilary Vincent
- Paul Guilfoyle as Baby Face Charlie
