= Wings Over the Pacific =

1943 film by Phil Rosen

- Theatrical poster
- Directed by: Phil Rosen
- Written by: George Wallace Sayre (story and screenplay)(Credited as George W. Savre); Harold Erickson
- Produced by: Lindsley Parsons; Jeffrey Bernerd
- Starring: Inez Cooper; Edward Norris; Montagu Love
- Cinematography: Mack Stengler
- Edited by: Carl Pierson
- Music by: Edward Kay
- Production company: Monogram Productions, Inc.
- Distributed by: Monogram Pictures Corp.
- Release date: July 23, 1943
- Running time: 59 or 60 minutes
- Country: United States
- Language: English

Wings Over the Pacific is a 60-minute 1943 drama film, directed by Phil Rosen and starring Inez Cooper, Edward Norris and Montagu Love. Produced by Monogram Pictures, the film depicts an island community in the South Pacific caught up in World War II.

== Plot ==
In 1943, World War I veteran Jim Butler (Montagu Love), along with his daughter Nona (Inez Cooper) and their English servant and friend, Harry Adams (Ernie Adams), live on Sunday Island, a small island in the South Pacific. Their idyllic life is shattered when an air battle takes place over the island. One pilot bails out of his damaged aircraft while the other pilot manages to land.

A German pilot, Lt. Kurt Heinmann (Henry Guttman) finds that the American pilot Allan Scott (Edward Norris) is unconscious, but before he is killed, Mona entreats Heinmann to bring the wounded American to her home. Butler is afraid that either pilot will contact their superiors about the valuable oil deposits on the island, so he takes control of the situation, confiscating the German's pistol and insisting that both antagonists agree to a truce.

Heinmann has a secret ally on the island, Captain Van Bronck (Robert Armstrong) and together, the two make plans to have Japanese invaders to take over the island. An uneasy alliance of Butler and the American pilot is needed to beat back the attack, but ultimately, the islanders and their friends are able to summon help from the Americans. Mona and Scott declare their love and prepare for a life together.

== Cast ==
- Inez Cooper as Nona Butler
- Edward Norris as Lt. Allan Scott (USN)
- Montagu Love as Jim Butler
- Robert Armstrong as Captain Pieter Van Bronck
- Henry Guttman as Lt. Kurt Heinmann
- Ernie Adams as Harry Adams
- Satini Puailoa as Chief
- John Roth as Taro
- Alex Havier as Japanese officer
- George Kamel as Native
- Jody Gilbert as Large female native
- James Lono as Native
- Hawksha Paia as Native
- Josephine as Josephine the bear

== Production ==
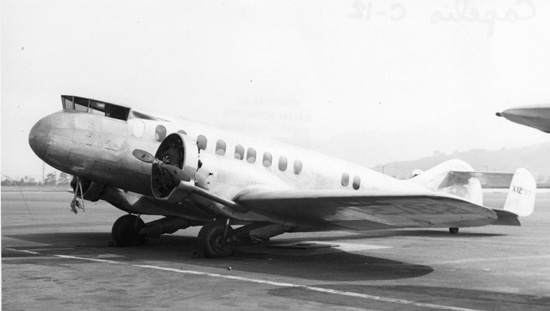
The Capelis XC-12 as a movie prop was used in numerous films including Wings Over the Pacific.

Principal photography on Wings Over the Pacific began on March 5, 1943 and continued until late-March. The location photography for Sunday Island was at the Monogram Pictures backlot. Monogram Pictures operated the Monogram Ranch, its movie ranch in Placerita Canyon near Newhall, California, in the northern San Gabriel Mountains foothills.

The aircraft in Wings Over the Pacific included the use of a Curtiss P-40 as a United States Navy (USN) fighter, although it was a replica and the only flying scenes used miniatures. (Note: The United States Navy did not use the Curtiss P-40.) (Note: The P-40 used in Wings Over the Pacific was part of the group of seven P-40 replicas built for Flying Tigers (1942).)

The Capelis XC-12, a failed 1933 airliner design that most notably was used as a prop, was featured in Wings Over the Pacific as a Japanese transport. The aircraft was bought by RKO in March 1939 and was used in a number of films during World War II, when flyable aircraft were unavailable. Previously, the XC-12 had appeared in Five Came Back (1939) with Chester Morris and Lucille Ball, The Flying Tigers (1942), starring John Wayne, and Immortal Sergeant (1943) with Henry Fonda, Thomas Mitchell and Maureen O'Hara. (Note: Grounded by the studio's insurance company, the XC-12 was primarily seen on the ground with flying scenes of an XC-12 model. In RKO's Dick Tracy's Dilemma (1947) the XC-12 was shown somewhat dismantled, but not scrapped, apparently its fate, shortly after the making of Daredevils of the Clouds (1948).)

== Reception ==
Wings Over the Pacific had a New York premiere, opening on the week of June 15, 1943. The film was seen as a primarily a B film programmer, typical of many of the propaganda films of the era. Aviation film historian Stephen Pendo, however, characterized the film as "... (a) poor Monogram production".
