= Action in Arabia =

1944 film by Léonide Moguy

- Theatrical poster
- Directed by: Leonide Moguy
- Written by: Philip MacDonald; Herbert J. Biberman
- Based on: The Fanatic of Fez; 1943 novel by M.V. Heberden
- Produced by: Maurice Geraghty
- Starring: George Sanders; Virginia Bruce; Robert Armstrong
- Cinematography: J. Roy Hunt
- Edited by: Robert Swink
- Music by: Roy Webb
- Production company: RKO Radio Pictures
- Distributed by: RKO Radio Pictures
- Release date: February 18, 1944
- Running time: 75 minutes
- Country: United States
- Language: English

Action in Arabia (also known as Danger in Damascus and International Zone) is a 1944 American spy thriller film directed by Leonide Moguy and starring George Sanders and Virginia Bruce. The film was based on the 1943 novel The Fanatic of Fez by M. V. Heberden. Action in Arabia was written by Philip MacDonald and Herbert J. Biberman. The supporting cast includes Gene Lockhart and Robert Armstrong. Despite the title, the plot involves trouble and intrigue with the Nazis in Damascus, who scheme to seize control of the Suez Canal.

== Plot ==
In the spring of 1941, American journalist Michael Gordon and his colleague, William Chalmers, arrive in Damascus. When Chalmers is murdered, Gordon sets out to find out why. He is helped along by glamorous secret agent Yvonne, who is on the trail of a group of Nazi saboteurs. Intrigue centers around the actions of Josef Danesco who offers to sell information, as well as French diplomatic official Andre Leroux and Eric Latimer, the owner of the Hotel International, both suspected of having connections with the Nazis.

Gordon enlists the help of Mathew Reed, a member of the American Legation and uncovers a plot to maneuver the Arabs into an insurrection as a diversion for an attack on the Suez Canal by the Nazis. Abdul El Rashid, the revered Arab leader, has been deceived by Kareem, a pro-Nazi chieftain. When Gordon proves Leroux to be a German provocateur to Abdul El Rashid, it results in the deaths of Reed and Leroux and the wounding of Gordon, but the plot to attack the Suez Canal is thwarted.

== Cast ==
As appearing in Action In Arabia, (main roles and screen credits identified):

- George Sanders as Michael Gordon
- Virginia Bruce as Yvonne Danesco
- Lenore Aubert as Mounirah al-Rashid
- Gene Lockhart as Josef Danesco
- Robert Armstrong as Matthew Reed
- H.B. Warner as Abdul El Rashid
- Alan Napier as Eric Latimer
- André Charlot as Andre Leroux (as Andre Charlot)
- Marcel Dalio as Chakka - Arab Henchman at Airport
- Robert Anderson as William Chalmers (credited as Robert Andersen)
- Jamiel Hasson as Eben Kareem
- Michael Ansara as Hamid (uncredited)
- John Hamilton as Mr. Hamilton (uncredited)
- Frank Lackteen as Ali Omar (uncredited)

== Production ==
=== Development ===
In April 1943 RKO announced they had bought the rights to an original story, The Fanatic of Fez, about the work of American agents in Africa prior to the invasion of Africa. (A novelisation of the story was published in May 1943.

George Sanders had just finished a long-term contract with 20th Century Fox and signed a three-picture deal with RKO of which this was to be the first. It was Virginia Bruce's first film in a year, having taken time off following the death of her husband, J. Walter Ruben.

=== Shooting ===
Filming started on 1 October 1943 under the title International Zone.

As world events turned to North Africa, the original setting of Algiers was dropped and Damascus became the locale, with a budget increase of $100,000 given to elevate the film to a higher status. (The New York Times said this was a 100% increase and it happened three weeks into filming.) The title was changed to Action in Arabia during filming. Shooting was delayed a week due to an illness to Virginia Bruce. (Another title was Danger in Damascus.

Set mainly on the RKO backlot, the production relied on the customary sets that had been used in a variety of other films including Gone with the Wind (1939).

In the opening scene, the Capelis XC-12 appears as an airliner; the venerable movie prop had been used in a number of films including RKO's Five Came Back (1939) and Republic's Flying Tigers (1942).

Action in Arabia does include a number of scenes of Arab life including a desert scene with numerous extras, horses and camel caravans. Years earlier, filmmakers Ernest B. Schoedsack and Merian C. Cooper had shot footage for an unrealized film about Lawrence of Arabia, that they were planning as a follow-up to their hit, King Kong (1933). This footage was integrated into Action in Arabia.

== Reception ==
Variety wrote "Although sticking close to formula in setting up myterious situations and characters for eventual clarification, the picture develops on a straight line and a good pace."

Bosley Crowther of The New York Times reviewed Action in Arabia, considering it better than the standard "B" film fare. "... 'Action in Arabia' is the sort of buncombe you get in the muscular fiction field. Not that it isn't pleasant buncombe. Leonide Moguy has directed it for that flair of exaggeration which distinguished the best B-grade intrigues."

== Legacy ==
Sanders later dismissed the film saying he was unable to remember it. He wrote in his memoirs, "I find I made things like Action in Arabia, Lured, and The Scarlet Coat. I can only assume I was paid handsomely for them, but I am at a complete loss as to what action there was in Arabia, or who was lured where and why. As to the scarlet coat, did I wear it, and if not, who did?"

Quentin Tarantino is an admirer of the movie.

== See also ==
- List of American films of 1944
