= Black Market Babies =

1945 film by William Beaudine

- Directed by: William Beaudine
- Written by: George Maurice; Virginia Reid (article); George Wallace Sayre
- Produced by: Jeffrey Bernerd
- Cinematography: Harry Neumann
- Edited by: William Austin
- Music by: Edward J. Kay
- Distributed by: Monogram Pictures
- Release date: December 15, 1945
- Running time: 71 min.
- Country: United States
- Language: English

Black Market Babies is a 1945 American crime drama film directed by William Beaudine and released by Monogram Pictures. The film has been released on DVD.

== Plot ==
A small-time hood teams up with an alcoholic obstetrician to set up a private maternity ward, where the expectant mothers' expenses are paid by the "donations" of "adoptive" parents. The racket goes wrong when one of the previously sold children is stillborn, which means the hood has to come up with a replacement baby.

== Cast ==
- Ralph Morgan as Dr. Henry Jordon
- Kane Richmond as Eddie Condon
- Jayne Hazard as Doris Condon
- Teala Loring as Evelyn Barrett
- Marjorie Hoshelle as Donna Corbett
- George Meeker as Anthony Marsden
- Maris Wrixon as Helen Roberts
- Nana Bryant as Mrs. Grace Andrews
- Addison Richards as the District Attorney
- Anthony Warde as Paul Carroll
- Selmer Jackson as Mr. Henry Andrews
- Dewey Robinson as Barney Kramer

== Production ==
The Motion Picture Producers and Distributors of America, which enforced the Hays Code at the time, did not allow films to show that pregnancy, if shown at all, resulted in any visual changes to a woman's body. After reviewing the script for Black Market Babies, it cautioned that actresses were not to use any padding to simulate pregnancy.
