= The Arizona Cowboy =

1950 film by R. G. Springsteen

- Theatrical release poster
- Directed by: R. G. Springsteen
- Screenplay by: Bradford Ropes
- Produced by: Franklin Adreon
- Starring: Rex Allen; Teala Loring; Gordon Jones; Minerva Urecal; James Cardwell; Roy Barcroft
- Cinematography: William Bradford
- Edited by: Harry Keller
- Music by: Stanley Wilson
- Production company: Republic Pictures
- Distributed by: Republic Pictures
- Release date: February 15, 1950
- Running time: 67 minutes
- Country: United States
- Language: English

The Arizona Cowboy is a 1950 American Western film directed by R. G. Springsteen and written by Bradford Ropes. The film stars Rex Allen, Teala Loring, Gordon Jones, Minerva Urecal, James Cardwell and Roy Barcroft. It was released on April 1, 1950 by Republic Pictures.

== Plot ==
A cowboy leaves his rodeo show to help his father, who is falsely accused of theft, and also to save a town from greedy oil barons.

== Cast ==
- Rex Allen as Rex Allen
- Teala Loring as Laramie Carson
- Gordon Jones as I.Q. Barton
- Minerva Urecal as Cactus Kate Millican
- James Cardwell as Hugh Davenport
- Roy Barcroft as Henchman Mike Slade
- Stanley Andrews as Jim Davenport
- Harry Cheshire as David Carson
- Edmund Cobb as Sheriff Fuller
- Joseph Crehan as Colonel Jefferson
- Steve Darrell as Sheriff Mason
- Douglas Evans as Rodeo Announcer
- John Elliott as Ace Allen
- Chris-Pin Martin as Café Owner Pedro
- Frank Reicher as Major Sheridan
- George Lloyd as Fogarty
- Lane Bradford as Henchman Curley Applegate

== Production ==
The film's star Rex Allen, born to a cattle-ranching family in southeastern Arizona in 1920, was already known as the Arizona Cowboy when the film was produced. Republic Pictures had hoped use the film to launch Allen as a Western film star in the tradition of other singing cowboys such as Gene Autry and Roy Rogers and planned to spend $5 million in advertising and promotion featuring Allen over the ensuing five years.
