= Jayne Hazard =

American actress (1922–2006)

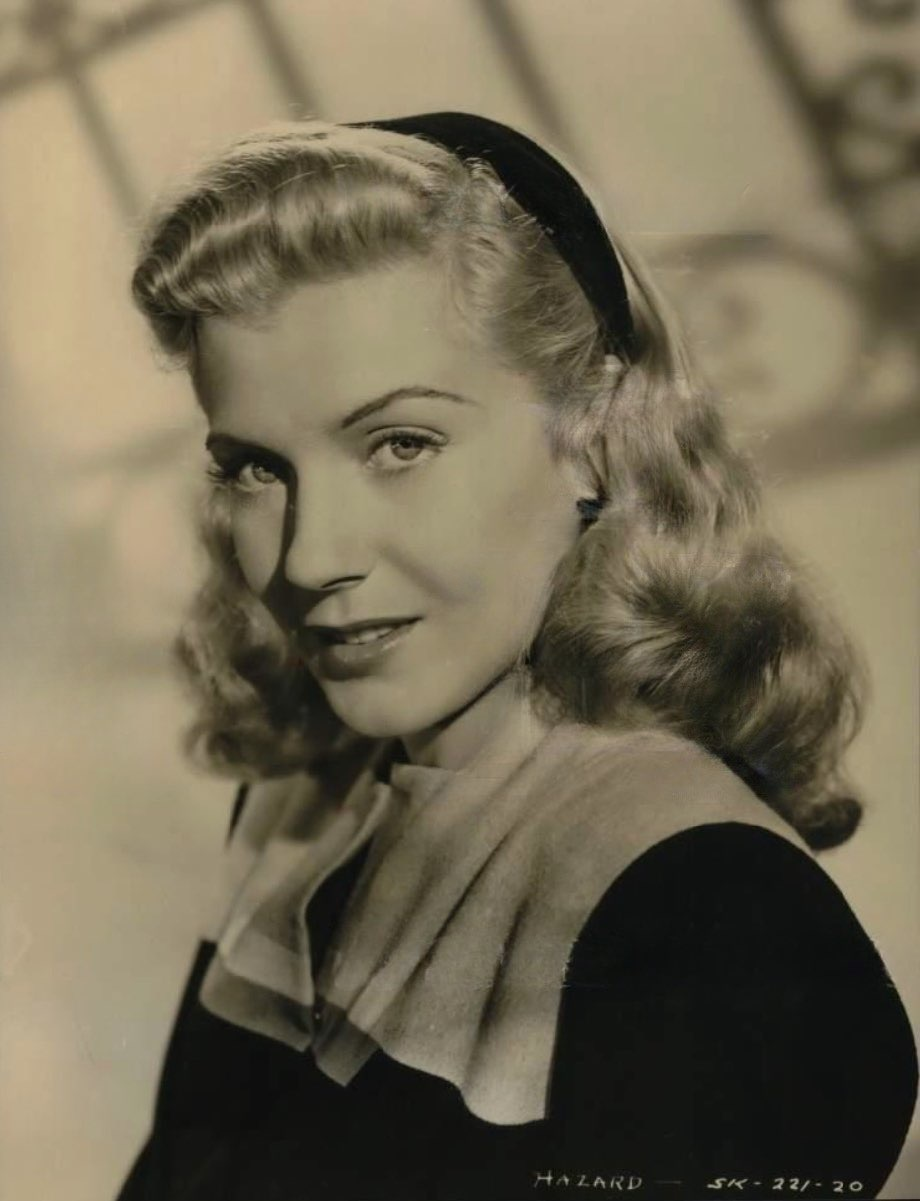
- Hazard in 1948
- Born: Aristene Jane Hazard; January 8, 1922; Tampa, Florida, U.S.
- Died: December 12, 2006 (aged 84); Palm Desert, California, U.S.
- Occupation: Actress
- Years active: 1941–1951
- Known for: Black Market Babies
- Spouse(s): Lowell Jasper Thompson (m. 1947; div. 1949); Guy Edward Ward (m. 1951; ?)
- Children: 2

Jayne Hazard (born Aristene Jane Hazard; January 8, 1922 – December 12, 2006) was an American film actress. She appeared in over 32 films between 1941 and 1951, including Black Market Babies (1945) and Strange Illusion (1945).

== Early life ==
Hazard was born in Tampa, Florida. She was the daughter of Julian Leslie Hazard and Aristene Jane Luther, well known in Tampa, where her father was a judge of criminal count of records.

== Career ==
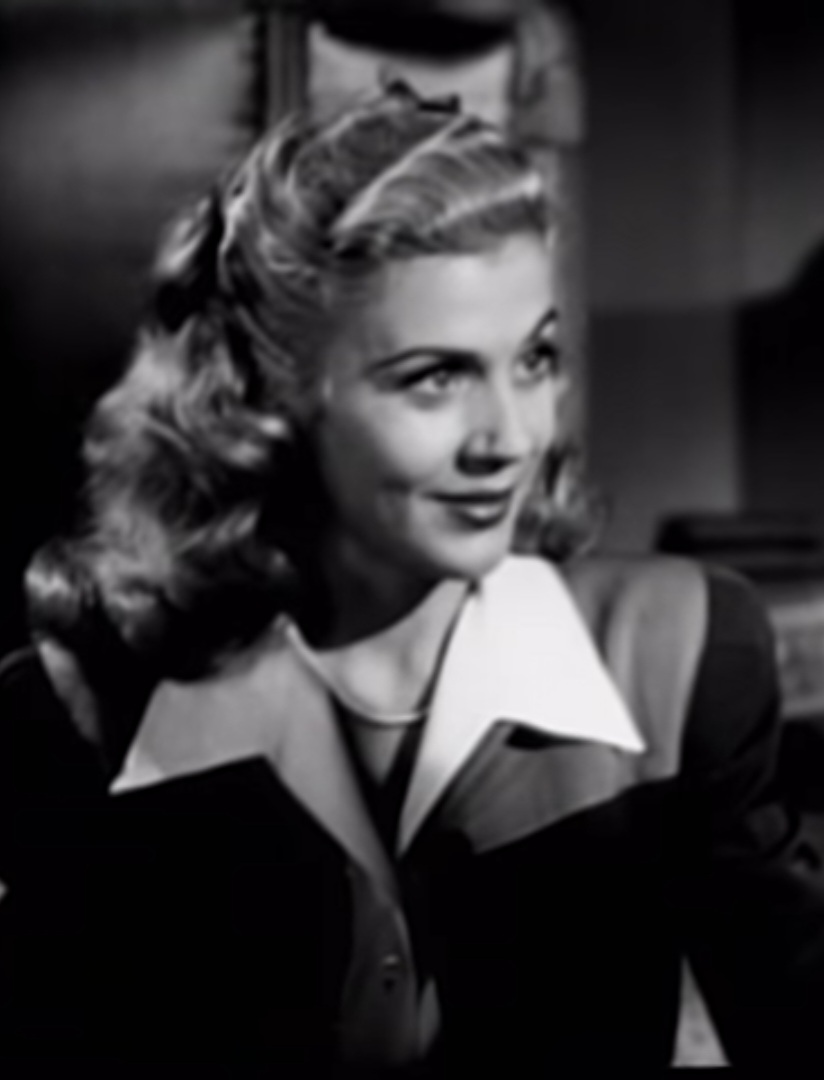
Hazard in Strange Illusion (1945)

Among Hazard's early minor film roles include Bedtime Story (1941), The Powers Girl (1943) and The Lost Weekend (1945). Her first major role came in the 1945 crime film Strange Illusion.

== Personal life and death ==
Hazard was married to theater owner Lowell Jasper Thompson in May 1947 until June 1949, when she was granted a divorce following a serious injury to her father from an aircraft owned by Thompson. Thompson, a theater owner, was said to have shown "no concern or remorse" and also failed to visit Hazard in hospital when she later became ill. In October 1951, Beverly Hills attorney Guy Edward Ward became Hazard's second husband, with whom she had two daughters, both of whom were born dead.

Hazard died in Palm Desert, California, in 2006, at the age of 84.

== Filmography ==
=== Film ===
- The Monster and the Girl (1941) as Party Girl
- Cadet Girl (1941) as Ona
- Bedtime Story (1941) as Mabel Chadwick
- A Tragedy at Midnight (1942) (uncredited)
- Westward Ho (1942) as Blonde Photographer
- Flying with Music (1942) as Jane
- Pardon My Sarong (1942) as Girl on Bus with Tommy
- Underground Agent (1942) as Secretary
- The Powers Girl (1943) as Powers America Beauty Pageant Model
- Let's Have Fun (1943) as Norma
- Prairie Chickens (1943) as Girl on Tour Bus
- She Has What It Takes (1943) as Chorus Girl
- Let's Face It (1943) as Chorus Girl
- Crazy Knights (1944) as Joan Gardner
- Here Come the Co-Eds (1945) as Co-Ed
- Rough, Tough and Ready (1945) as Myrtle Smythe
- Strange Illusion (1945) as Dorothy Cartwright
- Nob Hill (1945) (uncredited)
- You Came Along (1945) as Blonde Chorine
- The Lost Weekend (1945) as M.M. - Blonde with Purse
- Hold That Blonde (1945) as Apartment Tenant
- Who's Guilty? (1945) as Rita Royale
- Black Market Babies (1945) as Doris Condon
- Gay Blades (1946) as Olga
- Affairs of Geraldine (1946) as Miss Kyle
- Fun on a Weekend (1947) as Girl at Canteen
- The Trouble with Women (1947) as Tall Blonde
- Daredevils of the Clouds (1948) as Mollie
- I Can Get It for You Wholesale (1951) as Model
- Criminal Lawyer (1951) as Blonde
- The Racket (1945) as Girl

=== Television ===
- Racket Squad (1951) as Miss Manning (1 episode)
