= Cadet Girl =

1941 film by Ray McCarey

- Theatrical release poster
- Directed by: Ray McCarey
- Screenplay by: Stanley Rauh; H.W. Hanemann
- Story by: Jack Andrews; Richard English
- Produced by: Sol M. Wurtzel
- Starring: Carole Landis; George Montgomery; Shepperd Strudwick; William Tracy; Janis Carter; Robert Lowery
- Cinematography: Charles G. Clarke
- Edited by: Fred Allen
- Music by: David Buttolph
- Production company: 20th Century Fox
- Distributed by: 20th Century Fox
- Release date: November 28, 1941
- Running time: 68 minutes
- Country: United States
- Language: English

Cadet Girl is a 1941 American comedy film directed by Ray McCarey and written by Stanley Rauh and H.W. Hanemann. The film stars Carole Landis, George Montgomery, Shepperd Strudwick, William Tracy, Janis Carter and Robert Lowery. The film was released on November 28, 1941, by 20th Century Fox. The film was screened at Cinecon 46 in 2010.

== Plot ==
A West Point cadet falls in love with a girl who sings in his brother's band.

== Cast ==
- Carole Landis as Gene Baxter
- George Montgomery as Tex Mallory
- Shepperd Strudwick as Bob Mallory
- William Tracy as The Runt
- Janis Carter as Mary Moore
- Robert Lowery as Walton
- Basil Walker as Red
- Charles Tannen as Jimmy
- Chick Chandler as Benny Burns
- Otto Han as Foo
- Irving Bacon as Train conductor
- Jayne Hazard as Ona
- Edna Mae Jones as Mona
- Charles Trowbridge as Col. Bradley
- Marguerite Whitten as Margaret aka Brenda
