= Daughter of the Jungle (1949 film) =

1949 film by George Blair

- Theatrical release poster
- Directed by: George Blair
- Screenplay by: William Lively
- Story by: Sol Shor
- Produced by: Franklin Adreon
- Starring: Lois Hall; James Cardwell; Sheldon Leonard; James Nolan; William Wright; Jim Bannon
- Cinematography: John MacBurnie
- Edited by: Harold Minter
- Music by: Stanley Wilson
- Production company: Republic Pictures
- Distributed by: Republic Pictures
- Release date: February 8, 1949
- Running time: 69 minutes
- Country: United States
- Language: English

Daughter of the Jungle is a 1949 American adventure film directed by George Blair and written by William Lively. The film stars Lois Hall, James Cardwell, William Wright, and Sheldon Leonard, with James Nolan, and Jim Bannon. The film was released on February 8, 1949, by Republic Pictures.

== Plot ==
A small plane crash-lands in an African jungle. The pilot and his passengers – including a gangster and his accomplice who are being transported back to the USA in the custody of a government agent – encounter a missing millionaire and his Tarzan-like daughter, who tries to help the survivors get back to civilization.

== Cast ==
- Lois Hall as Ticoora
- James Cardwell as Paul Cooper
- Sheldon Leonard as Dalton Kraik
- James Nolan as Camser
- William Wright as Carl Easton
- Jim Bannon as Kenneth Richards
- George M. Carleton as Vincent Walker
- Al Kikume as Native
- Frank Lackteen as Mahorib
- Francis McDonald as Montu
- Alex Montoya as Tongo
- Leo C. Richmond as Porter
- Charles Soldani as Liongo

== Critical reception ==
The film is included in the 1978 book The Fifty Worst Films of All Time by Harry Medved and Randy Dreyfuss.
