= The Fighting Sullivans =

1944 film by Lloyd Bacon

The Fighting Sullivans a.k.a. The Sullivans
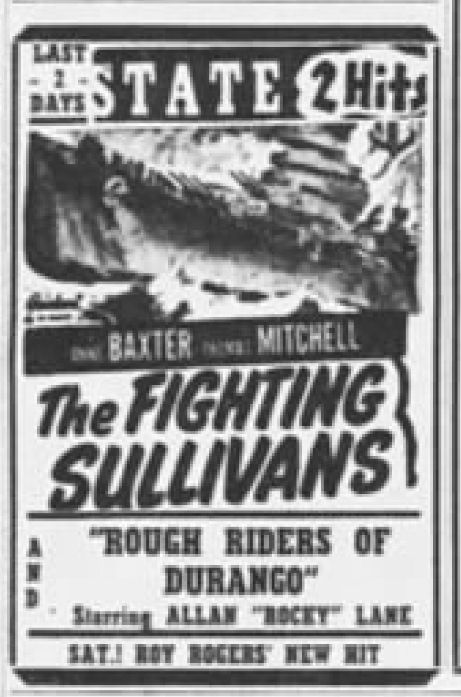
- Newspaper advertisement
- Directed by: Lloyd Bacon
- Written by: Edward Doherty; Mary C. McCall Jr. Jules Schermer
- Produced by: Sam Jaffe; Robert Kane
- Starring: Anne Baxter; Thomas Mitchell; Selena Royle; Edward Ryan; Trudy Marshall; John Campbell; James Cardwell; John Alvin; George Offerman Jr.
- Cinematography: Lucien N. Andriot
- Edited by: Louis R. Loeffler
- Music by: Cyril J. Mockridge
- Distributed by: Twentieth Century-Fox Film Corporation
- Release date: February 3, 1944
- Running time: 112 minutes
- Country: United States
- Language: English
- Box office: 2.429,684 admissions (France) $1 million (US rentals)

The Fighting Sullivans, originally released as The Sullivans, is a 1944 American biographical war film directed by Lloyd Bacon and written by Edward Doherty, Mary C. McCall Jr., and Jules Schermer. It was nominated for a now-discontinued Academy Award for Best Story.

The story retells, with some poetic license, the lives of five Irish-American Sullivan brothers, who grew up in Iowa during the days of the Great Depression and served together in the United States Navy during World War II.

== Plot ==
The Irish-American Catholic Sullivan brothers are introduced through a progression of baptisms: George Thomas in 1914, Francis "Frank" Henry in 1916, Joseph "Joe" Eugene in 1918, Madison "Matt" Abel in 1919, and Albert "Al" Leo in 1922 in their hometown of Waterloo, Iowa. There is also a sister, Genevieve, nicknamed "Gen", making the Sullivans a happy family of six.

Based on the apparent ages of the boys, the first part of the plot occurs in the late 1920s. As the boys grow, they are doted upon by their mother and Gen and given stern but loving guidance by their father, who is a railroad freight conductor. Each day, the boys climb the water tower by the tracks and wave to their father as he passes by on the train. The brothers are shown getting into their fair share of trouble growing up: a fight outside the church the day before Al's first communion, a near drowning after trying to fix a wrecked boat (after which their mother makes them promise to never set foot on a boat again), and accidentally flooding the kitchen after busting a pipe while trying to build a wood box in the side of the house.

By 1939, only Al is still in high school. On the day that George wins a motorcycle race, Al meets Katherine Mary (played by Anne Baxter) an only child who lives with her father. Despite their youth, Al and Katherine Mary fall in love, and Al invites her over for dinner to meet his family. The older brothers find a romantic letter Al has written to her, and decide to prank him during dinner by quoting parts of the letter and telling Katherine Mary those are lines he uses on all his girlfriends. Hurt and humiliated, she immediately breaks up with Al and storms out of the house. Realizing how much they hurt Al, the brothers apologize to Katherine Mary and explain what he wrote is really how he feels about her, leading to them reconciling and soon after marrying.

Ten months later, Al and Katherine Mary learn they are expecting a baby, and excitedly begin planning for it. However, Al is fired from his new job for taking the afternoon off to escort his wife to the doctor, and his brothers vow to help them out.

Later, months after little Jimmy has been welcomed into the family, the Sullivans are relaxing on a Sunday, December 7, 1941, when they hear about the attack on Pearl Harbor on the radio. The boys realize that one of their friends, Bill Bascom (Bill Ball in real life), was on USS Arizona and resolve to join the Navy to avenge him. Al decides that he cannot go with his brothers, due to his family responsibilities, but when Katherine Mary sees his despondent face, she tells him to go with the others to the recruiting station.

The brothers insist that they serve on the same ship, but the recruiting officer, LCDR Robinson (played by Ward Bond), states that the Navy can make no such guarantees. The brothers leave and write to the Navy Department, obtaining official permission for the boys to serve together.

Later, Tom, Alleta, and Katherine Mary eagerly await letters from their loved ones, who are serving aboard USS Juneau in the Pacific. During a battle off the Solomon Islands, the Juneau is hit and the order is given to abandon ship. Four of the brothers find each other, then realize that George was taken below to sick bay after being wounded. They rush down to get him as the ship continuing to be battered by explosions, and when George insists they leave him behind, Al replies, "We can't go swimming without you." Before they can get George up, the Juneau suffers a final explosion, and all five are killed.

Soon after, LCDR Robinson visits the Sullivan home and tells Katherine Mary, Tom, Alleta, and Gen that all five of the brothers were killed in action. Stunned, Tom says he hasn't missed work in 34 years, and goes to work. As his train departs, he sees the water tower on which his sons used to stand and wave to him, and salutes it.

Sometime later, Tom, Katherine Mary, and Gen, who has joined the WAVES, watch with pride while Alleta christens a new destroyer, USS The Sullivans. As Tom and Alleta watch the ship sail away, Alleta declares, "Tom, our boys are afloat again."

== Cast ==
- Anne Baxter as Katherine Mary Sullivan
- Thomas Mitchell as Mr. Thomas F. "Tom" Sullivan, the father
- Selena Royle as Mrs. Alleta Sullivan, the mother
- Edward Ryan as Albert Leo "Al" Sullivan
- Trudy Marshall as Genevieve Marie "Gen" Sullivan
- John Campbell as Francis Henry "Frank" Sullivan
- James Cardwell as George Thomas Sullivan
- John Alvin as Madison Abel "Matt" Sullivan
- George Offerman as Joseph Eugene "Joe" Sullivan
- Roy Roberts as Father Francis
- Ward Bond as Lieutenant Commander Robinson
- Bobby Driscoll as young Al Sullivan
- Buddy Swan as young George Sullivan

== Historical accuracy ==
While the film depicts all five dying together on board the ship, in actuality only Frank, Joe, and Matt went down with Juneau when she sank. George and Al managed to make it to a life boat, but Al died the next day. George survived before suffering from delirium as a result of hypernatremia, although some sources say he went mad with the grief of losing his brothers, and four or five days later he slipped quietly out of the raft, never to be seen again.

== See also ==
- List of American films of 1944
- Saving Private Ryan, a 1998 film with a similar (but entirely fictional) theme
