= Capelis XC-12 =

1933 American aircraft design

XC-12
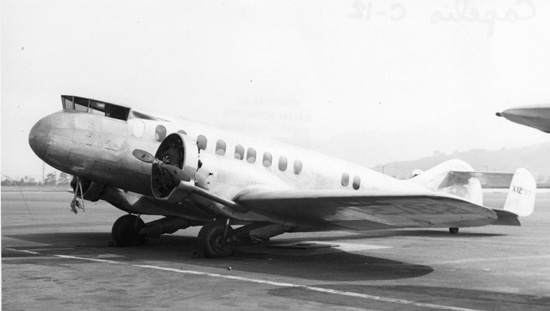

General information
- Type: Transport
- Manufacturer: Capelis Safety Airplane Company Ltd.
- Designer: John E. Younger
- Number built: 1

History
- Introduction date: 1933

The Capelis XC-12 was a 1933 aircraft design that most notably was used as a prop in the films Five Came Back, The Flying Tigers, The Falcon in Danger, and Immortal Sergeant. The aircraft featured unusual twin horizontal tail structures supported by three vertical tail surfaces. Construction and finishing methods involved using sheet metal screws which ultimately led to the abandoning of the project.

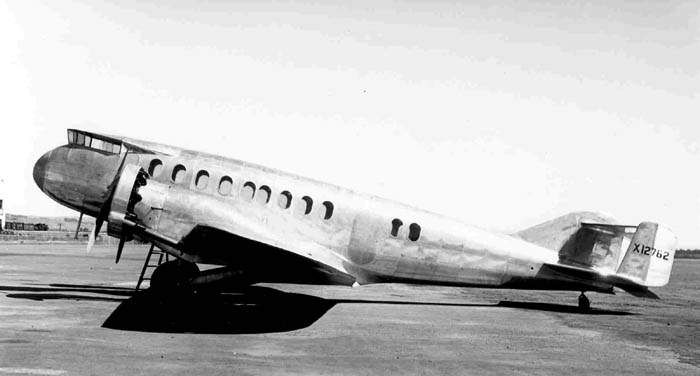
Side view

== Design and development ==
The original design by Socrates H. Capelis was issued U. S. patent #1,745,600 in 1930. The patent comprised a modified application with a half-span dorsal wing mounted rearward on top of the cabin and two additional engines mounted on the wings. The project was funded by local Greek restaurateurs as a promotional aircraft; it was constructed with help from University of California students.

A less radical design by Dr. John E. Younger featured all-metal construction; the aircraft was built as an all-metal, low-wing, retractable gear, twin engine transport with a triple vertical tail supporting a dual (biplane arrangement) horizontal stabilizer. The wing used a large box-spar construction with corrugated skin panels. The partly retracting landing gear extended automatically when the throttle was closed.

Following a 1938 incident, the XC-12 was modified at Glendale, California. The forward slanting eight-piece windshield was modified to a four piece that slanted rearward, and the passenger windows were squared off to look more like a Douglas DC-3.

== Operational history ==
On April 15, 1938, the XC-12 suffered minor damage from a forced landing after running out of fuel while flying over Fresno, California. The main wing spar construction was bolted together, and many of the metal skin panels were attached with P-K sheet metal screws rather than with permanent rivets. These tended to vibrate loose, requiring tightening or replacing every few flights, constituting a safety hazard that would later ground the aircraft. With promotional tours abandoned after the 1938 crash, the aircraft's flying career was over.

The aircraft was purchased by RKO in March 1939, after which the studio's insurance company permanently grounded the aircraft. Used as a full-size prop, the transport appeared only in ground roles in RKO's feature films made during World War II; flying sequences used a scale XC-12 shooting miniature. The aircraft became a RKO back lot relic, falling into worse repair during the 1940s until it was completely scrapped some time around 1950. The XC-12 miniature continued to be used in later feature films.

The aircraft was featured as a prop in Five Came Back (1939), The Flying Tigers (1942), and Immortal Sergeant (1943). In RKO's Dick Tracy's Dilemma (1947) the XC-12 was shown somewhat dismantled, and in Daredevils of the Clouds (1948), after which it was apparently scrapped.

== Filmography ==
- Five Came Back (RKO) 1939 (aircraft and model)
- Flying Blind (Paramount) 1941 (model)
- King of the Zombies (Monogram) 1941 (model and disassembled fuselage)
- Flying Tigers (Republic) 1942 (aircraft and model) John Wayne guides in a crippled XC-12 with an engine on fire, and later uses it as an improvised bomber
- Invisible Agent (Universal) 1942
- Immortal Sergeant (20th Century Fox) 1942/1943 (aircraft and model)
- Adventures of the Flying Cadets (Universal) 1943 (model)
- Night Plane from Chungking (Paramount) 1943
- The Falcon in Danger (RKO) 1943 (while a Lockheed Model 10 Electra aircraft model is used for the in-flight scenes, the full-size aircraft appears as a wreck)
- Wings Over the Pacific (Monogram) 1943 (model)
- The Purple V (RKO) 1943
- Action in Arabia (RKO) 1944
- Passport to Destiny (RKO) 1944
- Jungle Queen (serial) (Universal) 1945; re-edited into Jungle Safari a 1956 feature film
- Dick Tracy's Dilemma (RKO) 1947 The aircraft is shown somewhat dismantled in this movie, but not scrapped
- Daredevils of the Clouds (Republic) 1948 (model)
- Jungle Goddess (Lippert Pictures) 1948 (model)
- Tarzan's Magic Fountain (RKO) 1949 (model)
- On the Isle of Samoa (Columbia) 1950 (model)
- China Gate (Globe Enterprises) 1957 (model)

== Specifications (XC-12) ==
Data from skyways

General characteristics

- Capacity: 12
- Length: 42 ft (13 m)
- Wingspan: 55 ft (17 m)
- Height: 12 ft (3.7 m)
- Wing area: 500 sq ft (46 m^{2})
- Airfoil: Modified USA 45
- Empty weight: 6,500 lb (2,948 kg)
- Gross weight: 9,500 lb (4,309 kg)
- Fuel capacity: 145 gal
- Powerplant: 2 × Wright Cyclone R-1750 Radial, 525 hp (391 kW) each
- Propellers: 2-bladed

Performance

- Maximum speed: 190 kn (220 mph, 350 km/h)
- Cruise speed: 170 kn (190 mph, 310 km/h)
- Stall speed: 53 kn (61 mph, 98 km/h)
- Service ceiling: 28,000 ft (8,500 m)

== See also ==
- Photo of the XC-12

Aircraft of comparable role, configuration, and era

- Boeing 247
