= Strange Illusion =

1945 film by Edgar George Ulmer

- Theatrical release poster
- Directed by: Edgar G. Ulmer
- Screenplay by: Adele Comandini
- Story by: Based on an original story by Fritz Rotter
- Produced by: Leon Fromkess
- Starring: James Lydon; Sally Eilers; Warren William; Regis Toomey; Charles Arnt; George H. Reed; Jayne Hazard; Jimmy Clark; Mary McLeod; Pierre Watkin; John Hamilton; Sonia Sorel; Vic Potel
- Cinematography: Philip Tannura, A.S.C. Eugen Schüfftan (uncredited)
- Edited by: Carl Pierson (supervising film editor)
- Music by: Musical score composed and conducted by Erdody
- Production company: P R C Pictures, Inc.
- Distributed by: P R C Incorporated
- Release date: March 31, 1945 (United States)
- Running time: 87 minutes
- Country: United States
- Language: English

Strange Illusion is a 1945 film noir. Loosely inspired by Hamlet, it was envisioned as a modern crime film. It was directed by Edgar G. Ulmer and starred Jimmy Lydon, Warren William and Sally Eilers. According to noir historian Spencer Selby the film is "a stylish cheapie by the recognized master of stylish cheapies."

== Plot ==
A college student has a recurrent dream that leads him to suspect there is something sinister about his widowed mother's suitor.

== Cast ==
- James Lydon as Paul Cartwright
- Warren William as Brett Curtis
- Sally Eilers as Virginia Cartwright
- Regis Toomey as Dr. Vincent
- Charles Arnt as Professor Muhlbach
- George H. Reed as Benjamin
- Jayne Hazard as Dorothy Cartwright
- Jimmy Clark as George
- Mary McLeod as Lydia
- Pierre Watkin as Armstrong
- Sonia Sorel as Miss Farber
- Vic Potel as Mac-Game Warden
- George Sherwood as Langdon
- Gene Stutenroth as Sparky
- John Hamilton as Mr. Allen

== Reception ==
=== Critical response ===
Film critic Dennis Schwartz liked the film's atmospherics but gave a mixed review to the production as a whole, writing, "The dark psychological thriller had an engrossing premise courtesy of Mr. Shakespeare and was influenced further by Freudian dream analysis, but it was unconvincing as a melodrama, the script was weak, the plot was full of holes and the acting was as lame as it gets...What's interesting is that the film is shot as an intense dream sequence in shadowy black-and-white hues and its sense of delirium powerfully filters through the story almost wiping away the unconvincing heavy-handed performances of the villains and the mummified acting by the leads. It's a film where Ulmer's unique style and his film noir moody interjections work better than the derivative mystery story."

Critic Matthew Sorrento of Film Threat also lauded the film: "Though saddled with the script’s fetish for Freud, Ulmer stylizes his thriller without sending it adrift. Like his other great films, Strange Illusion is a shaggy quickie that takes fine shape throughout."

== See also ==
- List of films in the public domain in the United States
