= Old Overland Trail =

1953 film by William Witney

- Theatrical release poster
- Directed by: William Witney
- Written by: Milton Raison
- Produced by: Edward J. White
- Starring: Rex Allen; Slim Pickens; Roy Barcroft; Virginia Hall; Gil Herman; Wade Crosby
- Cinematography: John MacBurnie
- Edited by: Harold Minter
- Music by: R. Dale Butts
- Production company: Republic Pictures
- Distributed by: Republic Pictures
- Release date: February 25, 1953
- Running time: 60 minutes
- Country: United States
- Language: English

Old Overland Trail is a 1953 American Western film directed by William Witney and written by Milton Raison. The film stars Rex Allen, Slim Pickens, Roy Barcroft, Virginia Hall, Gil Herman and Wade Crosby. The film was released on February 25, 1953, by Republic Pictures.

== Plot ==
Rex (Rex Allen) and Slim (Slim Pickens) and army sergeant (Marshall Reed) encounter two drunk Indians. After dealing with them a third is spotted and Rex catches chief Blackhawk (Leonard Nimoy) who claims a white man gave them the whiskey. Blackhawk rides off and meets with John Anchor (Ray Barcroft), a crooked railroader. The next day, Rex and Slim meets Mary Peterson (Virginia Hall) arriving on a wagon train. Blackhawk attacks and burns the wagons enabling Anchor to get the settlers to work for him. Back in town Rex's brother Jim (Gil Herman) confronts Anchor about the Indian attack. At the Indian camp Rex accuses Blackhawk of the attack. A fight ensues with Rex sparing Blackhawks life. Next the incoming stage is robbed of the settlers payroll by Anchor's men enabling him to issue strips to the settlers for supplies. The storekeeper (Harry Harvet, Sr.) offers to redeem the strips for 25 cents on the dollar. In town Rex accuses his brother of being part of the swindle, they fight with Rex emerging the victor. Rex is now sure Anchor is behind the swindle and he and Slim rob the stage of the second settlers payroll beating Anchor's men to the punch. During all this Jim tells Anchor he wants no part of the swindle. Anchor slugs him and Jim dies on the way to the doctor. In town Mary tells Rex a posse is after him for killing his brother. Rex and Slim leave to hide in the hills but not before giving the payroll to Mary who tells him, " I know you didn't do it." At Blackhawk's camp Anchor promises more guns if he catches Rex and Slim. Blackhawk does and ties up Rex and Slim at his camp. Anchor receives a telegram informing him the railroad commissioner is arriving with the settlers payroll to investigate and he is to assist. Anchor knows he will found out and rides to the Indian camp. Blackhawk refuses to help Anchor rob the train and is shot. Anchor then persuades the Indians for help robbing the train and they ride off. Blackhawk, only wounded frees Rex and Slim who ride to town for help. Rex, Slim and the settlers stop the train robbery but Anchor escapes with Rex after him. Anchor waits to ambush Rex but Blackhawk arrives and kills him with an arrow. Rex waves a final salute to Blackhawk as he falls off his horse and dies. Back in town Rex bids Mary goodbye and rides off.

== Cast ==
- Rex Allen as Rex Allen
- Koko as Rex's Horse
- Slim Pickens as Slim Pickens
- Roy Barcroft as John Anchor
- Virginia Hall as Mary Peterson
- Gil Herman as Jim Allen
- Wade Crosby as Draftsman
- Leonard Nimoy as Chief Black Hawk
- Zon Murray as Mack
- Harry Harvey, Sr. as Storekeeper
- Army sergeant, Marshall Reed (uncredited)

The Republic Rhythm Riders as Musicians
