= Robin Hood of Texas =

1947 film by Lesley Selander

- Theatrical release poster
- Directed by: Lesley Selander
- Screenplay by: John K. Butler; Earle Snell
- Produced by: Sidney Picker
- Starring: Gene Autry; Lynne Roberts; Sterling Holloway; Adele Mara; James Cardwell; John Kellogg
- Cinematography: William Bradford
- Edited by: Harry Keller
- Production company: Republic Pictures
- Distributed by: Republic Pictures
- Release date: July 15, 1947 (U.S.)
- Running time: 71 minutes 54 minutes
- Country: United States
- Language: English

Robin Hood of Texas is a 1947 American Western film directed by Lesley Selander and written by John K. Butler and Earle Snell. The film stars Gene Autry, Lynne Roberts, Sterling Holloway, Adele Mara, James Cardwell, and John Kellogg. The film was released on July 15, 1947, by Republic Pictures.

== Plot ==
Robin Hood of Texas is a 1947 American Western film directed by Lesley Selander. The story follows a group of former musicians who, after being cheated out of their earnings by a crooked promoter, decide to turn to a life of crime to recover their lost money. Inspired by the legendary outlaw Robin Hood, they begin robbing from the wealthy to give back to those in need. Along the way, they find themselves entangled with the law, but also with locals who admire their daring spirit. The film combines elements of comedy, adventure, and romance, with Gene Autry playing a key role as the charismatic leader of the group, whose moral struggle forms the heart of the story.

== Cast ==
- Gene Autry as Gene Autry
- Sterling Holloway as Droopy Haynes
- Adele Mara as Julie
- James Cardwell as Duke Mantel
- John Kellogg as Nick
- Ray Walker as Detective Lt. Lacey
- Archie Twitchell as Jim Prescott
- Paul Bryar as Ace
- James Flavin as Captain Danforth
- Dorothy Vaughan as Mrs. O'Brien
- Stanley Andrews as Mr. Hamby
- Al Bridge as Sheriff
- The Cass County Boys as Musicians
- Bert Dodson as Bass Player Bert
- Fred S. Martin as Accordion Player Freddie
- Jerry Scoggins as Guitar Player Jerry
