= The Homesteaders =

1953 film by Lewis D. Collins

- Theatrical film poster
- Directed by: Lewis D. Collins
- Written by: Milton Raison; Sidney Theil
- Produced by: Vincent M. Fennelly
- Starring: Bill Elliott; Robert Lowery; Emmett Lynn
- Cinematography: Ernest Miller
- Edited by: Sam Fields
- Music by: Raoul Kraushaar
- Production company: Silvermine Productions
- Distributed by: Allied Artists
- Release date: March 23, 1953
- Running time: 62 minutes
- Country: United States
- Language: English

The Homesteaders is a 1953 American Western film directed by Lewis D. Collins, and starring Bill Elliott, Robert Lowery, and Emmett Lynn.

== Cast ==
- Bill Elliott as Mace Corbin
- Robert Lowery as Clyde Moss
- Emmett Lynn as Old Grimer
- George Wallace as Meade
- Robert "Buzz" Henry as Charlie
- Stanley Price as Van
- Rick Vallin as Slim
- William Fawcett as Hector
- James Seay as John Kroger
- Tom Monroe as Henchman Jake
- Barbara Woodell as Jenny Moss
- Ray Walker as Colonel Peterson
