= Lady Chaser =

1946 film

- Theatrical release poster
- Directed by: Sam Newfield
- Screenplay by: Fred Myton
- Story by: G.T. Fleming-Roberts
- Produced by: Sigmund Neufeld
- Starring: Robert Lowery; Ann Savage; Inez Cooper; Frank Ferguson; William Haade; Ralph Dunn
- Cinematography: Jack Greenhalgh
- Edited by: Holbrook N. Todd
- Music by: Walter Greene
- Production company: Sigmund Neufeld Productions
- Distributed by: Producers Releasing Corporation
- Release date: November 25, 1946
- Running time: 58 minutes
- Country: United States
- Language: English

Lady Chaser is a 1946 American mystery film directed by Sam Newfield and written by Fred Myton. The film stars Robert Lowery, Ann Savage, Inez Cooper, Frank Ferguson, William Haade and Ralph Dunn. The film was released on November 25, 1946, by Producers Releasing Corporation.

== Cast ==
- Robert Lowery as Peter Kane
- Ann Savage as Inez Marie Polk
- Inez Cooper as Dorian Westmore
- Frank Ferguson as Oliver T. Vickers
- William Haade as Bill Redding
- Ralph Dunn as Brady
- Paul Bryar as Garry
- Charles Williams as Apartment House Manager
- Garry Owen as Herman
- Marie Martino as Anna Nelson
