= Crazy Knights =

1944 film by William Beaudine

- Directed by: William Beaudine
- Written by: Tim Ryan
- Produced by: Jack Dietz; Sam Katzman
- Starring: Billy Gilbert; Shemp Howard; Max Rosenbloom; Tim Ryan
- Cinematography: Marcel Le Picard
- Edited by: Richard C. Currier
- Music by: Edward J. Kay
- Production company: Banner Productions
- Distributed by: Monogram Pictures
- Release date: December 18, 1944
- Running time: 63 minutes
- Country: United States
- Language: English

Crazy Knights (also known as Ghost Crazy) is a 1944 American comedy horror film directed by William Beaudine and starring Billy Gilbert, Shemp Howard and Max Rosenbloom.

The film focuses on a trio of traveling carnival performers who offer help to a stranded man and his daughter. They accompany the man to his estate, which seems to be haunted by ghosts. They discover a murder shortly after arriving.

== Plot ==
Billy Gilbert, Shemp Howard and Dave Hammond manage a carnival act with a live gorilla named Barny with Shemp posing as the gorilla during the actual act. While driving to their next carnival performance, they are side tracked by picking up stranded Mr. Gardner and his daughter Joan Gardner whom Dave seems quite smitten with.

Joan's father is convinced that someone is trying to kill him and the actions of his suspicious secretary, Mr. Williams seem to confirm this. Gardner insists that the carnival trio take him and his entourage to one of his residences that is close by, though his daughter is upset by the idea. The Gardners' chauffeur is left to stay with their broken down car.

When they arrive at the Gardner estate, they are met by a mysterious and strange house servant Mrs. Benson and an Electrician who is roaming about the house. Billy and Shemp are terrorized by ghostly voices, transforming pictures and figures dressed in sheets. Maxie finally arrives at the estate shortly after a suspicious character named Mr. Grogan does. As things get stranger, Maxie teams up with Gilbert and Howard, Shemp dons the gorilla outfit and Barny the real gorilla gets free from his mobile cage trailer. Soon after a body is discovered and it is clearly a case of murder.

== Cast ==
- Billy Gilbert as Billy
- Shemp Howard as Shemp
- Max Rosenbloom as Maxie
- Tim Ryan as Grogan
- Jayne Hazard as Joan Gardner
- Tay Dunn as Ralph Williams
- Minerva Urecal as Mrs. Benson
- John Hamilton as Mr. Gardner
- Bernard Sell as Dave Hammon
- Betty Sinclair as Girl
- Buster Brodie as Baldy
- Art Miles as Barney the Gorilla
- Dan White as Electrician

== Production notes ==
The film is 63 minutes with the story wrapping up in the final two minutes. Billy Gilbert, Shemp Howard and Max "Maxie" Rosenbloom all use their actual names in the movie.

== Bibliography ==
- Rigby, Jonathan. American Gothic: Sixty Years of Horror Cinema. Reynolds & Hearn, 2007.
- Marshall, Wendy L. William Beaudine: From Silents to Television. Scarecrow Press, 2005.
