= John Robert Powers =

American talent agent (1892–1977)

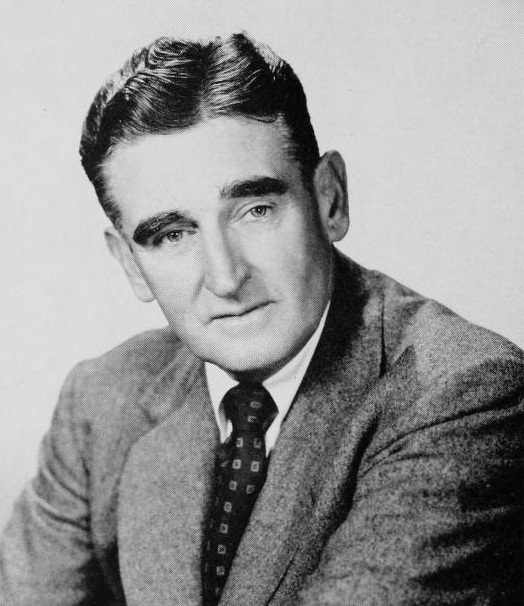
John Robert Powers, circa 1955

John Robert Powers (September 14, 1892 – July 21, 1977) was an American actor and founder of a New York City modeling agency.

== Career ==
In 1923, Powers founded a modeling school. The John Robert Powers Agency represented models who aspired to success in the Hollywood film industry. While Powers' clientele were overwhelmingly female, the school also represented several men. The agency was the subject of a 1943 musical comedy, The Powers Girl, in which Alan Mowbray portrayed Powers; the film featured Anne Shirley and Carole Landis as aspiring models.

John Robert Powers was born to John J. Powers and Margaret Shindan in Easton, Pennsylvania, as reported in the record of his marriage in Manhattan on September 28, 1922, to Alice Virginia Burton (1902–1972). According to this record, she was the daughter of William Burton and Helen Vleit. John Robert Powers and his wife Alice are buried together at Forest Lawn Memorial Park in Glendale, California. Discrepancies exist regarding his date of birth (1892 appears on his gravestone and the U.S. Census record of 1900, but on his World War I draft registration card dated 6/5/17 in New York City, he self-reported his birthday as September 14, 1895).

Almost 100 years later, John Robert Powers Agency has transformed from a modeling school to a school focused on personality development all throughout East Asia and Southeast Asia, specifically countries such as China, Indonesia, the Philippines, and Thailand.

== Controversy ==
John Robert Powers franchises have been criticized for using high-pressure sales tactics and misleading advertising. John Robert Powers USA asserts that it is not an agency and does not make any percentage of the talents' earnings.

The Los Angeles Better Business Bureau believes that Powers fits the definitions of a "talent agency" and an "advance-fee talent agent" as per California law. Nevertheless, the BBB notes that Powers would "undoubtedly deny that they are either [type of agency]" and that Powers' contracts do not use such terms. The Los Angeles BBB further notes:

All complaints cited in this article were filed against the Ontario John Robert Powers office. Although our complaints against a number of other Powers franchises are similar, some Powers locations in our files have no complaints. Nevertheless, we urge you to check our reliability report before signing a contract and to [be] aware that John Robert Powers, wherever located, is a school.

JRP websites include photos of famous personalities and name other celebrities as graduates. Pictures of celebrities such as Lucille Ball, Marilyn Monroe and John Wayne hang in the lobby of franchises. The Los Angeles Better Business Bureau attempted to contact some of these celebrities through their agents or close family members, and those who responded neither attended classes at JRP nor authorized use of their likeness. Celebrities, their representatives or immediate family members who claimed no involvement with JRP schools included Lucille Ball, Heather Locklear, Barbara Walters, Henry Fonda, Jane Fonda, and John Wayne. Michele Carey, Betty Ford, and Grace Kelly worked as models at the JRP agency, as did Kim Basinger's mother Ann Cordell. The 10th anniversary issue of Life—whose cover features the then 11-year-old Nancy Malone (née Maloney)—states, "Nancy Maloney of Long Island, shown on cover holding first issue of LIFE, is one of the most successful young Powers models.
