= Inez Cooper =

American film actress (1921–1993)

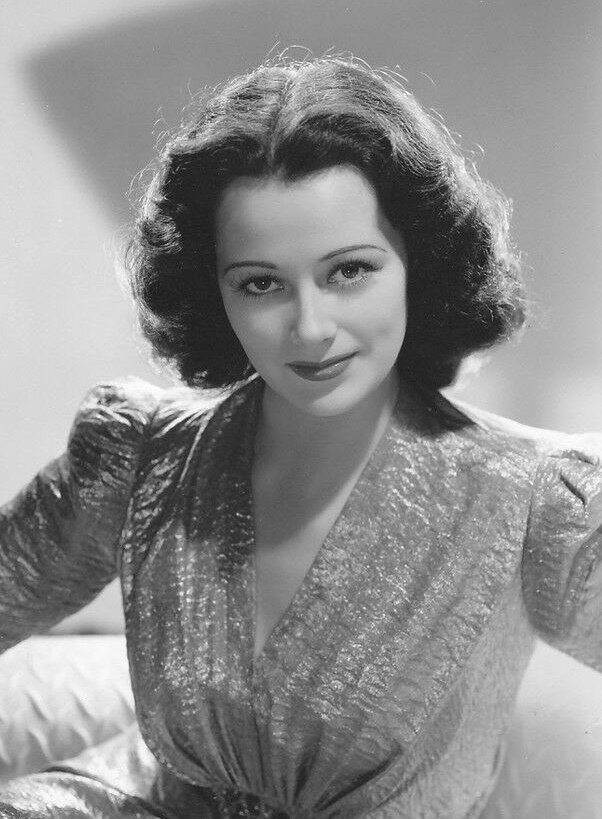
- Publicity photo of Cooper
- Born: Elizabeth Inez Cooper; March 23, 1921; Birmingham, Alabama, United States
- Died: December 1, 1993 (aged 72); Montgomery, Alabama
- Resting place: Alabama Heritage Cemetery
- Occupation: Actress
- Years active: 1942–1951
- Height: 5 ft 6 in (1.68 m)
- Spouse: Fred Hamilton Davidson (m. 1943)

Elizabeth Inez Cooper (March 1921 – December 1993) was an American actress, noted at the time for closely resembling actress Hedy Lamarr. Before her Hollywood career, Cooper worked in a department store, engaged in modeling jobs and traveled worldwide. Producer Mervyn LeRoy discovered her at a nightclub in 1941, mistaking her for Lamarr. After being offered a professional acting contract, Cooper entered the film industry and studied dramatics, although initially could only secure minor roles.

Despite her resemblance to Lamarr, Cooper faced challenges in landing significant roles, often relegated to minor parts in films such as Whistling in the Dark and Du Barry Was a Lady. She expressed frustration with issues arising from her uncanny similarity to Lamarr, although did secure the lead in the 1943 romance film Wings Over the Pacific, as the only female among the main cast.

Cooper died in December 1993 at a local hospital and was buried at Alabama Heritage Cemetery.

== Early life and family ==
Elizabeth Inez Cooper was born on March 23, 1921 in Birmingham, Alabama, as the youngest of three children. Her mother was Mary Cooper and was a direct descendant of Robert E. Lee. Her father was Thomas S. Cooper, a retired baptist minister and later a carpenter. As a child, she enjoyed fishing with her father at their farm in Greene County, as well as accompanying him on hunting trips. He introduced her to various sports, including horseback riding when she was six, while she was experienced with a rifle just a year later. During her early childhood, she would spend several summer months each year visiting her grandmother's plantation in Georgia, which Cooper considered to be "the most wonderful events in my early life".

Around 1935, the family moved to Atlanta after her father lost the farm in which most of his life savings had been invested. The relocation meant that Cooper was unable to complete her high school education.

== Career ==
Before her Hollywood career, Cooper worked in a Miami department store selling cosmetics, as well as holding down a small modeling job. She had also modeled jewelry in New York, during a relatively uneventful period in her life. She was also known to have traveled around the world, from Mexico to as far as Australia.

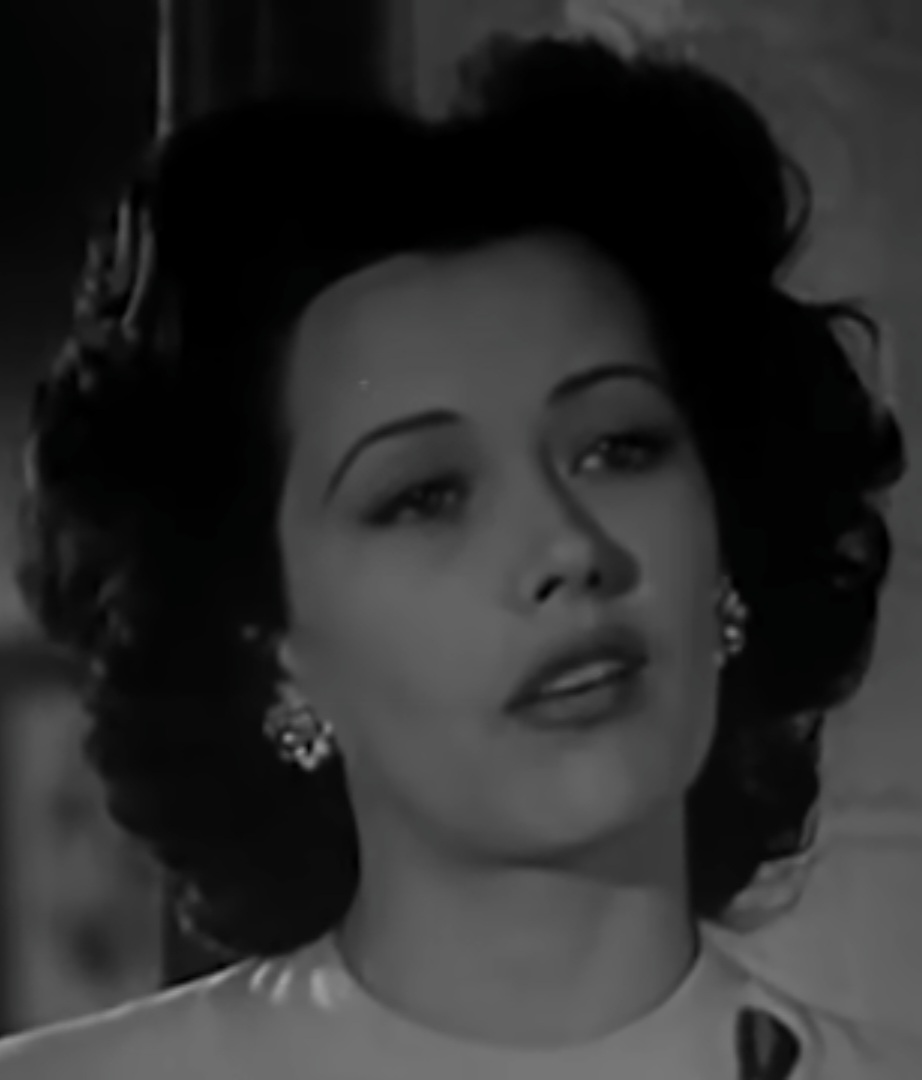
Cooper in Flight to Nowhere (1946)

Cooper's entrance into the film industry was unexpected, after being first spotted by director and producer Mervyn LeRoy while sitting with friends at the Mocambo night club, California in mid-1941. She had originally traveled to California hurriedly, as she had a modelling job in New York awaiting. While in the nightclub, LeRoy mistook her for actress Hedy Lamarr, who then apologized for his intrusion and invited her to his office, where she was later offered a professional acting contract following a short screen test. It wasn't the first time that LeRoy has discovered new talent in a night club or restaurant, having found Loretta Young and Patricia Dane in similar circumstances. She subsequently began studying dramatics and catching up on missed education, having had to prematurely leave high school following her relocation to Atlanta.

Early in her career, Cooper had to contend with minor bit-part roles in films such as Whistling in the Dark and Du Barry Was a Lady. Despite studying under a drama coach, professional contracts did not come her way. She remarked in 1943 that resembling Lamarr was exasperating and at one time, considered dying her hair blonde. Her resemblance to Lamarr was so striking, that while disembarking from a plane, she was mobbed by fans who mistook her for the Hollywood actress. On one occasion, early into her marriage, she and her husband entered a bistro, where patrons mistook her for Lamarr, with one reportedly remarking that "even the most perfect marriage in this town goes on the rocks", believing that Lamarr had been spotted with another man.

Cooper undertook a sit-down strike in 1943, having not been given opportunities with Metro-Goldwyn-Mayer, who instead decided to loan her to Monogram Pictures. While on loan, she would take the lead role in the 1943 romance film Wings Over the Pacific and was the only female to star among the main cast. Monogram were reportedly so impressed with Cooper, that they wanted her to stay with them to complete a further two films. She was later released by Metro-Goldwyn-Mayer Studios, in part due to the stark similarities in appearance between her and Lamarr.

== Personal ==
Cooper was reportedly very superstitious, and would avoid a black cat if it crossed into her path. As well as having an interest in dancing, she was known to enjoy the company of dogs and cats, with her mother describing her as being "crazy about animals". She reportedly married Lieutenant Fred Davidson some time around August 1943. The previous year in January 1942, she had reportedly been preparing to marry actor Bill Marshall on her birthday, having been engaged for several months. In 1951, she was reported to be preparing marriage to actor Mike Carr.

== Death ==
Cooper died on December 1, 1993, at a local hospital in Montgomery, Alabama, aged 72. She was buried at Alabama Heritage Cemetery on December 3, 1993.

== Filmography and performances ==
| Year | Title | Role |
|---|---|---|
| 1942 | I Married an Angel | Iren |
| 1942 | Stand By for Action | Susan Garrison |
| 1943 | Wings Over the Pacific | Nona Butler |
| 1943 | Girl Crazy | Showgirl |
| 1946 | Flight to Nowhere | Irene Allison |
| 1946 | 'Neath Canadian Skies | Linda Elliot |
| 1946 | North of the Border | Ruth Wilson |
| 1946 | Lady Chaser | Dorian Westmore |
| 1947 | Riding the California Trail | Delores Ramirez |
| 1949 | The Barkleys of Broadway | Pamela Driscoll |
| 1950 | Border Treasure | Anita Castro |
