= 'Neath Canadian Skies =

1946 film

- Directed by: B. Reeves Eason
- Based on: story by James Oliver Curwood
- Produced by: William David executive Robert L. Lippert
- Music by: Carl Hoefle; James Mayfield
- Production company: Golden Gate Productions
- Distributed by: Screen Guild Productions
- Release date: October 15, 1946
- Country: United States
- Language: English

'Neath Canadian Skies is a 1946 American Northern film about Mounties.

It was directed by B. Reeves Eason from a story by James Oliver Curwood. Filming took place in June 1946 through Golden Gate Pictures, in a studio that used to be a ping pong parlor.

The same team also made North of the Border (1946).

== Cast ==
- Russell Hayden as Tim Ransom, also known as Joe Reed
- Inez Cooper as Linda Elliot
- Douglas Fowley as Ned Thompson
- Cliff Nazarro as Wilbur Higgins
- I. Stanford Jolley as Bill Haley
- Jack Mulhall as Captain Sharon
- Kermit Maynard as Stony Carter
