= The Contender (1944 film) =

1944 film by Sam Newfield

- Film poster
- Directed by: Sam Newfield
- Written by: George Wallace Sayre (story) and Jay Doten (story); George Wallace Sayre (screenplay) and Jay Doten (screenplay) and Raymond L. Schrock (screenplay)
- Produced by: Bert Sternbach
- Starring: See below
- Cinematography: Robert E. Cline
- Edited by: Holbrook N. Todd
- Music by: Albert Glasser
- Distributed by: Producers Releasing Corporation
- Release date: May 10, 1944
- Running time: 63 minutes 27 minutes (US edited TV version)
- Country: United States
- Language: English

The Contender is a 1944 American film directed by Sam Newfield. The film is also known as Challenger (American TV title).

== Cast ==
- Buster Crabbe as Gary Farrel
- Arline Judge as Linda Martin
- Julie Gibson as Rita Langdon
- Donald Mayo as Mickey Farrel
- Glenn Strange as Biff Benham
- Milton Kibbee as "Pop" Turner
- Roland Drew as Kip Morgan
- Sam Flint as Major Palmer
- George Turner as Sparky Callahan
- Duke York as "Bomber" Brown
- Jimmy Aubrey as Dance Club Drunk
