= North of the Border (film) =

1946 film

- Directed by: B. Reeves Eason
- Based on: story by James Oliver Curwood
- Produced by: William David executive Robert L. Lippert
- Production company: Golden Gate Productions
- Distributed by: Screen Guild Productions
- Release date: 1946
- Country: United States
- Language: English

North of the Border is a 1946 American Western film.

The movie was directed by B. Reeves Eason and based on a story by James Oliver Curwood. Many of the same cast and crew also worked on 'Neath Canadian Skies.

Although the film credits James Curwood, TCM states that "the film does not appear to have been based on one of his stories."

== Synopsis ==
American rancher "Utah" Nyes (Hayden) comes to Canada to meet his partner, Bill Lawton. He finds that Lawton has been murdered by a gang led by "Nails" Nelson (Fowley). With the help of Mountie Jack Craig (Talbot), and fur-trapper Ivy Jenkins (Jolley), "Utah" manages to clear himself of the murder of Lawton, and also to break up Nelson's gang.

== Cast ==
- Russell Hayden as Robert "Utah" Nyes
- Inez Cooper as Ruth Wilson
- Douglas Fowley as "Nails" Nelson
- Lyle Talbot as RCMP Sergeant Jack Craig
- Anthony Warde (as Anthony Ward) as Jean Gaspee
- I. Stanford Jolley as Ivy Jenkins
- Guy Beach as George Laramie
- Jack Mulhall as RCMP Captain Swanson
- Richard Alexander (as Dick Alexander) as Tiny Muller
