= Riding the California Trail =

1947 film directed by William Nigh

- Theatrical release poster
- Directed by: William Nigh
- Screenplay by: Clarence Upson Young
- Based on: The Cisco Kid by O. Henry
- Produced by: Scott R. Dunlap
- Starring: Gilbert Roland; Martin Garralaga; Frank Yaconelli; Teala Loring; Inez Cooper; Ted Hecht
- Cinematography: Harry Neumann
- Edited by: Fred Maguire
- Production company: Monogram Pictures
- Distributed by: Monogram Pictures
- Release date: January 11, 1947
- Running time: 59 minutes
- Country: United States
- Language: English

Riding the California Trail is a 1947 American Western film directed by William Nigh and written by Clarence Upson Young. The film stars Gilbert Roland as the Cisco Kid, Martin Garralaga, Frank Yaconelli, Teala Loring, Inez Cooper and Ted Hecht. The film was released on January 11, 1947, by Monogram Pictures.

== Cast ==
- Gilbert Roland as The Cisco Kid / Don Luis Salazar
- Martin Garralaga as Don José Ramirez
- Frank Yaconelli as Baby
- Teala Loring as Raquel
- Inez Cooper as Delores Ramirez
- Ted Hecht as Don Raoul Pedro Reyes
- Marcelle Grandville as Dueña Rosita
