= Who's Guilty? =

1945 film by Wallace Grissell, Howard Bretherton

- Directed by: Howard Bretherton; Wallace Grissell
- Written by: Ande Lamb; George H. Plympton
- Produced by: Sam Katzman
- Starring: Robert Kent; Amelita Ward; Tim Ryan; Jayne Hazard; Minerva Urecal; Charles B. Middleton
- Cinematography: Ira H. Morgan
- Edited by: Earl Turner
- Music by: Lee Zahler
- Distributed by: Columbia Pictures
- Release date: December 13, 1945
- Running time: 15 chapters (? minutes)
- Country: United States
- Language: English

Who's Guilty? is a 1945 American film serial. It was the 28th of 57 serials released by Columbia Pictures. Who's Guilty? was a rare attempt at a whodunit mystery film in serial form. The serial's villain (The Voice) was designed to look like The Shadow on the poster. The film co-starred some well-known character actors, such as Charles Middleton, Wheeler Oakman, and Minerva Urecal. Robert Kent played the lead role of Detective Bob Stewart.

== Plot ==
Walter Calvert (Clark) calls upon his brother Henry at his eerie old house and demands a share of the family fortune, threatening to kill Henry if he doesn't get it. Within days, Henry's car goes over a cliff. Bob Stewart (Kent), a detective Henry asked to investigate the matter if he should die, begins his investigation accompanied by his pal Duke Ellis, a newspaper reporter. Bob meets the family at its mansion and questions Henry's sister, his half-brother, his nephew, and his nephew's bride, along with Ruth Allen (Ward), whose father was in business with Henry. Henry's brother Patton (Middleton) and a shadowy figure known as The Voice plan to kill all the relatives and divide the fortune. As the murder attempts multiply, Bob, Ruth, and Duke endeavor to track down the masterminds and bring them to justice.

== Cast ==
- Robert Kent as Bob Stewart, detective
- Amelita Ward as Ruth Allen, love interest
- Tim Ryan as Duke Ellis
- Jayne Hazard as Rita Royale
- Minerva Urecal as Mrs Dill, the housekeeper
- Charles B. Middleton as Patton, the butler/Walter Calvert
- Davison Clark as Henry Calvert, the murder victim
- Sam Flint as Horace Black, the victim's lawyer
- Bruce Donovan as Curt Bennett
- Jack Ingram as Sergeant Smith
- Milton Kibbee as Morgan Calvert
- Nacho Galindo as Pancho
- Robert Tafur as Jose
- Wheeler Oakman as Smiley
- Charles King as Burke

== Production ==
Producer Sam Katzman had been making feature films for budget studio Monogram Pictures. Columbia hired him to make its serials, and Katzman made the first few on the side at Monogram, using that studio's sets, technicians, and actors. Among the Monogram regulars appearing in Who's Guilty? are Tim Ryan, Wheeler Oakman, Amelita Ward, Jayne Hazard, Minerva Urecal, Milton Kibbee, and Belle Mitchell.

== Reception ==
The whodunit formula was not ideal for serials, which relied on fast action, fistfights, and chases in various outdoor settings. The script's emphasis on indoor filming and a limited premise—suspicious characters lurking around an old house—resulted in slowness and repetition. Although producer Katzman went on to make successful serials with mysterious masked villains, he never made another murder-mystery serial.

Serial historian Daniel J. Neyer comments on the serial's plodding storyline, "completely ineffectual in a five-hour serial. The 'mystery’s' ultimate solution becomes obvious in the first chapter, which makes all the subsequent obfuscation so transparent that it quickly gets irksome... The real damage to the serial is done by its tedious pacing; in order to fill the aforementioned five hours, characters waste far too much time in conversations that lead nowhere, variously plotting their moves, pondering over suspicious incidents, or vehemently but pointlessly bickering with each other. The dialogue in these scenes is so mediocrely written and (in some cases) so poorly delivered that it’s not even interesting, unlike similarly oversized portions of talk in Universal’s serials from the same era."

In the opinion of author William C. Cline, Robert Kent as police investigator Bob Stewart was the only sane characterization in a "complicated melange of victims and suspects...[Other characters] seemed lost in a swirl of plots, counterplots and cross plots that none of them could understand."

== Chapter titles ==
1. Avenging Visitor
2. The Unknown Strikes
3. Held For Murder
4. A Killer at Bay
5. Human Bait
6. The Plunge of Doom
7. A Date with Fate
8. Invisible Hands
9. Fate's Vengeance
10. The Unknown Killer
11. Riding to Oblivion
12. The Tank of Terror
13. White Terror
14. A Cry in the Night
15. The Guilty One

_{Source:}

== See also ==
- List of film serials by year
- List of film serials by studio

Preceded by Jungle Raiders (1945)	Columbia Serial; Who's Guilty? (1945)	Succeeded by Hop Harrigan (1946)
