= Topeka (film) =

1953 film by Thomas Carr

- Directed by: Thomas Carr
- Written by: Milton Raison
- Produced by: Vincent M. Fennelly
- Starring: Wild Bill Elliott; Phyllis Coates; Rick Vallin
- Cinematography: Ernest Miller
- Edited by: Sam Fields
- Music by: Raoul Kraushaar
- Production company: Allied Artists Pictures
- Distributed by: Allied Artists Pictures
- Release date: August 9, 1953
- Running time: 69 minutes
- Country: United States
- Language: English

Topeka is a 1953 American Western film directed by Thomas Carr and starring Wild Bill Elliott, Phyllis Coates and Rick Vallin.

== Cast ==
- Wild Bill Elliott as Jim Levering
- Phyllis Coates as Marian Harrison
- Rick Vallin as Ray Hammond
- Fuzzy Knight as Pop Harrison
- John James as Marv Ronsom
- Denver Pyle as Jonas Bailey
- Dick Crockett as Will Peters
- Harry Lauter as Mack Wilson
- Dale Van Sickel as Henchman Jake Manning
- Ted Mapes as Henchman Cully
- Henry Rowland as Cheated Gambler
- Edward Clark as Banker Corley
- I. Stanford Jolley as Doc Mason

== Bibliography ==
- Martin, Len D. The Allied Artists Checklist: The Feature Films and Short Subjects of Allied Artists Pictures Corporation, 1947-1978. McFarland & Company, 1993.
