= James Cardwell (actor) =

American actor

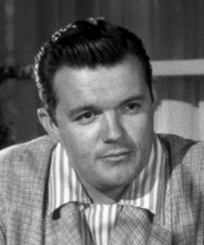
- Cardwell in He Walked by Night (1948)
- Born: Albert Paine Cardwell; November 21, 1921; Camden, New Jersey, U.S.
- Died: January 31, 1954 (aged 32); Los Angeles, California, U.S.
- Occupation: Actor
- Years active: 1944–1954
- Spouse: Esther Borton (divorced)

James Cardwell (born Albert Paine Cardwell; November 21, 1921 – January 31, 1954) (Note: Sources listing Cardwell's year of birth as 1920 appear to be in error. His death certificate records that he shot himself Sunday, January 31, 1954, and his body was discovered the following day. Some sources, including the California Death Index, give February 1, 1954 as his "official" date of death.) was an American actor who appeared in more than 20 Hollywood films in the 1940s.

== Career ==
Cardwell is probably best known for his debut as George Sullivan in 1944's Oscar-nominated The Fighting Sullivans, based on the true story of five navy brothers who died in action together when their ship was torpedoed in the Pacific Theater during World War II. His other significant roles included the Benny Goodman musical Sweet and Low-Down (1944), the World War II drama A Walk in the Sun (1945), and the police drama He Walked by Night (1948). Reviewing the 1945 Charlie Chan mystery The Shanghai Cobra, the Kentucky New Era remarked that "James Cardwell, a newcomer to the screen, shows himself to be a fine actor as the romantic lead opposite beautiful Joan Barclay." However, he found himself consigned to B-movies; 1949's Daughter of the Jungle, in which Cardwell played the male lead opposite Lois Hall, earned the dubious distinction of a listing in the 1978 book The Fifty Worst Films of All Time.

In 1950, Cardwell toured Australia with comedian Joe E. Brown in a production of the play Harvey. He then joined the Colleano Troupe, a variety act, with whom he toured Australia, the UK, and the U.S. After returning to the U.S., he made two guest appearances in the Rod Cameron television series City Detective. However, his movie career had stalled. He made only one additional appearance before his death: a small unbilled role in the 1954 monster film Them!

== Personal life ==
Cardwell was born Albert Paine Cardwell in Camden, New Jersey, the son of Raymond Cardwell and Bessie McCarroll. He graduated from Woodrow Wilson High School in 1940.

In 1942, he married Esther Borton. They divorced two years later. In 1951, he became engaged to Australian model June Crocker, but she ended their relationship after she suffered serious burns in a stage accident. According to author Jeffery P. Dennis, Cardwell subsequently "came out" as gay.

== Death ==
Apparently disheartened by his faltering career and financial difficulties, Cardwell fatally shot himself at the age of 32 in Los Angeles, California on January 31, 1954.

== Filmography ==
- The Fighting Sullivans (1944) as George Thomas Sullivan
- Sweet and Low-Down (1944) as Johnny Birch
- The Shanghai Cobra (1945) as Ned Stewart
- Voice of the Whistler (1945) as Fred Graham
- A Walk in the Sun (1945) as Sergeant Hoskins
- Fear (1946) as Ben
- Behind the Mask (1946) as Jeff Mann
- Canyon Passage (1946) as Gray Bartlett
- The Missing Lady (1946) as Terry Blake
- The Devil on Wheels (1947) as Jeff Clark
- It Happened on Fifth Avenue (1947) as Young man in barracks (uncredited)
- Robin Hood of Texas (1947) as Duke Mantel
- The Return of the Whistler (1948) as Charlie Barkley
- King of the Gamblers (1948) as 'Speed' Lacey
- Daredevils of the Clouds (1948) as Johnny Martin
- Harpoon (1948) as Red Dorsett Jr.
- Parole, Inc. (1948) as Duke Vigili
- He Walked by Night (1948) as Chuck Jones
- Trouble Preferred (1948) as Hal 'Tuffy' Tucker
- Daughter of the Jungle (1949) as Paul Cooper
- Down Dakota Way (1949) as Saunders
- San Antone Ambush (1949) as Clint Wheeler
- Tokyo Joe (1949) as Military Police Captain (uncredited)
- And Baby Makes Three (1949) as Police officer (uncredited)
- The Arizona Cowboy (1949) as Hugh Davenport
- Them! (1954) as Officer (uncredited) (final film role)
