= King of the Zombies =

1941 film

- Promotional release poster
- Directed by: Jean Yarbrough
- Written by: Edmond Kelso
- Produced by: Lindsley Parsons
- Starring: Dick Purcell; Joan Woodbury; Mantan Moreland
- Cinematography: Mack Stengler
- Edited by: Richard C. Currier
- Music by: Edward J. Kay
- Production companies: Sterling Productions, Inc.
- Distributed by: Monogram Pictures Corporation
- Release date: May 14, 1941
- Running time: 67 minutes
- Country: United States
- Language: English

King of the Zombies is a 1941 American zombie comedy film directed by Jean Yarbrough and starring Dick Purcell, Joan Woodbury, and Mantan Moreland. The film was produced by Monogram Pictures, and was typical of its B films produced by the Pine-Thomas team. Along with flying scenes, the use of zany characters and slapstick efforts were juxtaposed with a spy and zombie story.

In the film, a transport aircraft crash-lands on a remote island during a storm. The passengers take refuge in a local mansion, and discover that the owner controls zombies through use of voodoo. The role of the villainous Dr. Miklos Sangre was intended for Bela Lugosi, who was unavailable. The first choice to replace him was Peter Lorre, but negotiations with him failed. Henry Victor was then cast in the role.

== Plot ==
In 1941, a Capelis XC-12 transport aircraft flying between Cuba and Puerto Rico runs low on fuel and is blown off course by a storm. The pilot, James "Mac" McCarthy, cannot pick up any radio transmissions over the Caribbean except for a faint signal. After crash-landing on a remote island, passenger Bill Summers and his valet Jefferson Jackson, take refuge in a mansion owned by Dr. Miklos Sangre and his wife Alyce .

Jackson, frightened by his surroundings, is convinced the mansion is haunted by zombies and confirms this with some of Dr. Sangre's servants. The stranded group becomes aware that mysterious events are taking place in the mansion.

The group stumbles upon a voodoo ritual in the cellar conducted by the doctor who is in reality a foreign spy trying to acquire war intelligence from a captured US Admiral whose aircraft had also crashed on the island. McCarthy falls under the doctor's spell but Summers comes to his aid. When Summers stops the ritual, the zombies turn on their master. Sangre shoots the pilot but falls to his death in a firepit. With Sangre dead, all the zombies are released from his spell.

== Cast ==
- Dick Purcell as James "Mac" McCarthy
- Joan Woodbury as Barbara Winslow
- Mantan Moreland as Jefferson "Jeff" Jackson
- Henry Victor as Dr. Miklos Sangre
- John Archer as Bill Summers
- Patricia Stacey as Alyce Sangre
- Guy Usher as Admiral Arthur Wainwright
- Marguerite Whitten as Samantha, the Maid
- Leigh Whipper as Momba, the Butler
- Madame Sul-Te-Wan as Tahama, the Cook and High Priestess
- James Davis (credited as Jimmy) as Lazarus, a Zombie
- Laurence Criner as Dr. Couillie

== Production ==
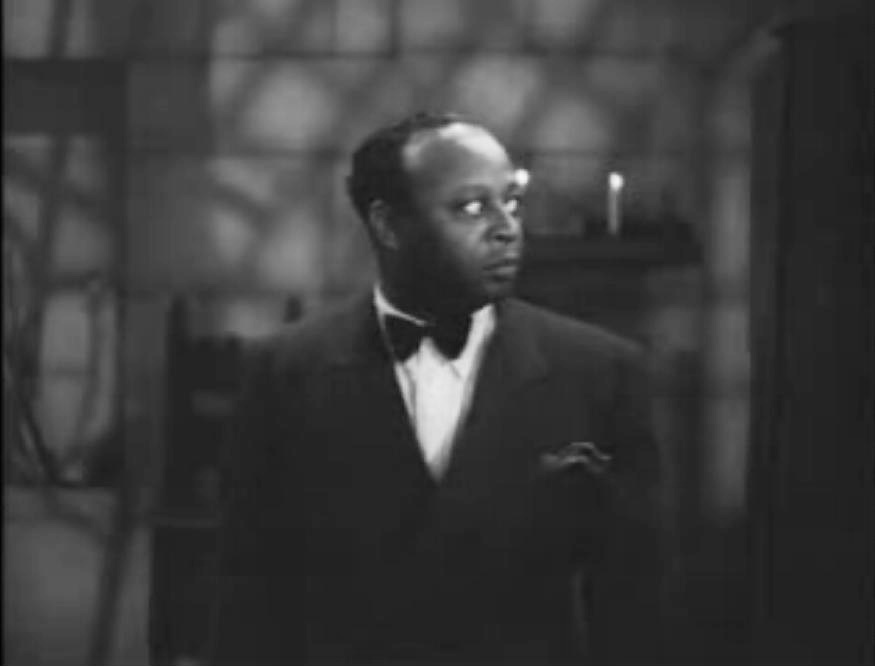
Mantan Moreland as "Jeff" Jackson

King of the Zombies was announced in January 1941 as a vehicle for Bela Lugosi. It was inspired by the success of The Ghost Breakers (1940).

Lugosi was meant to play the role of Dr. Sangre. When he became unavailable, negotiations ensued to obtain Peter Lorre for the part, but a deal could not be reached. Veteran character actor Henry Victor was signed just prior to the date of filming.

Principal photography by Sterling Productions, Inc. began on March 28, 1941, and wrapped in early April, being primarily filmed on a studio back lot. The transport aircraft used in King of the Zombies was a Capelis XC-12, built in 1933 by Capelis Safety Airplane Corporation of California. The aircraft was a 12-seat, low-wing cabin monoplane with two 525 hp Wright Cyclone engines. (Note: The aircraft appears as both a model and in disassembled form as a crashed aircraft.)

== Release ==
In the press kit for King of the Zombies, Monogram advised exhibitors to sell "it along the same lines as Paramount's The Ghost Breakers (1940)." The Bob Hope horror/comedy was a runaway hit at the time.

== Reception ==
Writing in The Zombie Movie Encyclopedia, academic Peter Dendle called King of the Zombies "... utterly absurd and delightful". Bruce G. Hallenbeck, who wrote Comedy-Horror Films, said that the film's politically incorrect humor comes off as innocent due to Moreland's delivery. Tom Weaver, audio commentator for VCI Entertainment's "King of the Zombies" Blu-ray, pointed out that the zombies were incidental to the plot, but praised the comic relief of Mantan Moreland and the villainous performance of Henry Victor.

=== Awards ===
King of the Zombies was nominated for an Academy Award for Best Music (Music Score of a Dramatic Picture) (Edward Kay).

== Sequel ==
Two years later, King of the Zombies was followed by a sequel, of sorts, called Revenge of the Zombies (1943) that included two of the original cast members. Mantan Moreland reprised his role as Jeff. Madame Sul-Te-Wan was cast as Mammy Beulah, the housekeeper.
