= The Powers Girl =

1943 film by Norman Z. McLeod

- Directed by: Norman Z. McLeod
- Written by: Eddie Moran; William A. Pierce (story); John R. Powers (book); Harry Segall; Marvin Wald
- Produced by: Charles R. Rogers
- Starring: George Murphy; Anne Shirley; Carole Landis; Dennis Day; Benny Goodman; Peggy Lee
- Cinematography: Stanley Cortez
- Edited by: George M. Arthur
- Music by: Louis Silvers
- Production company: Charles R. Rogers Productions
- Distributed by: United Artists
- Release date: January 15, 1943 (United States)
- Running time: 93 minutes
- Country: United States
- Language: English
- Box office: $1 million (US rentals)

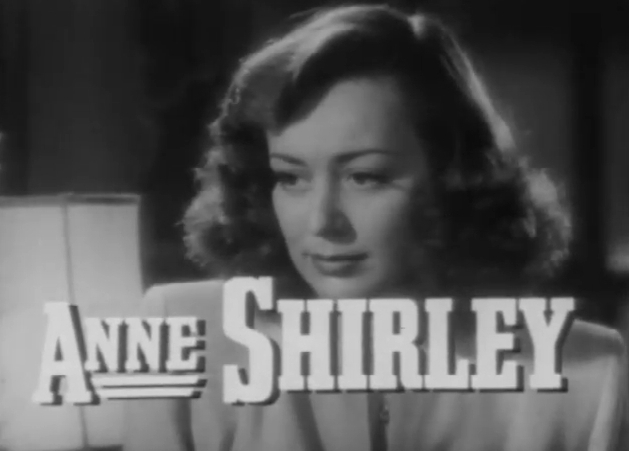
Anne Shirley

The Powers Girl, sometimes retitled Hello, Beautiful, is a 1943 musical comedy film about women employed by John Robert Powers' modeling agency. Starring George Murphy, Anne Shirley, and Carole Landis, the film was directed by Norman Z. McLeod and based upon the book by John Robert Powers (played by Alan Mowbray in the film).

It was filmed during the height of the Big Band era and features Benny Goodman and His Orchestra. Vocalist Peggy Lee sings with the band in an unbilled appearance during one sequence.

== Cast ==
- George Murphy as Jerry Hendricks
- Anne Shirley as Ellen Evans
- Carole Landis as Kay Evans
- Dennis Day as himself
- Benny Goodman as himself
- Alan Mowbray as John Robert Powers
- Peggy Lee as herself (uncredited)
- Jean Ames as Googie
- Mary Treen as Nancy
- Rafael Storm as Vandy Vandegrift
- Helen MacKellar as Mrs. Hendricks
- Harry Shannon as Mr. Hendricks
- Roseanne Murray as Edna Lambert
- Jayne Hazard as Model in Waiting Room
- Lillian Eggers as Model
- Linda Stirling as Model
- Evelyn Frey as Model
- Eloise Hart as Model
- Patricia Mace as Model
- Barbara Slater as Model
- Rosemary Coleman as Model
- Edna Johnson as Model
- Rebel Randall as Model
- Teala Loring as Model (billed as Judith Gibson)
