= The Shanghai Cobra =

1945 film

- Directed by: Phil Karlson
- Written by: Earl Derr Biggers (characters); George Callahan; George Wallace Sayre
- Produced by: James S. Burkett
- Starring: see below
- Cinematography: Vincent J. Farrar
- Edited by: Ace Herman
- Music by: Edward J. Kay
- Production company: Monogram Pictures
- Distributed by: Monogram Pictures
- Release date: September 29, 1945
- Running time: 64 minutes
- Country: United States
- Language: English

The Shanghai Cobra is a 1945 mystery film directed by Phil Karlson and starring Sidney Toler as Charlie Chan.

== Plot ==
When three bank employees are killed with cobra venom, Detective Chan recalls an oddly similar case ten years earlier in Shanghai.

In Shanghai in 1937, criminal Jan Van Horn was badly burned when the Japanese bombed Shanghai. After plastic surgery, he escaped custody and nobody knows what he looks like today.

Inspector Davis, in charge of the case, is an old friend of Chan's who calls him in. Chan has a second reason to be interested...the bank is the central depository for radium distribution for a good part of the United States. The special vault holding the radium is a monster that seems impregnable from street level. But Charlie discovers a network of underground tunnels and sewer pipes beneath the bank.

Tommy Chan and Birmingham, usually against orders, spend a goodly amount of time prowling these tunnels. At least until they discover a fourth body. Detective Larkin, an undercover officer posing as the bank's janitor, apparently found out too much.

Another puzzle is how the murders were committed. There was no actual snake, and all the victims died out of reach of the nearest human being. Charlie discovers the first three victims all favored the same inexpensive restaurant. When he learns their expensive jukebox came from "an anonymous donor", he tracks down the control room booth for the jukebox. Oddly, it is concealed behind a bookcase on the second floor of the bank building...in an office housing a full chemical laboratory. The woman running the booth is arrested, but she has never seen her boss. Charlie discovers that when you touch the coin return button on the jukebox, a poisoned needle pops out.

Charlie plants a false rumor that the radium will be moved to a safer location the next day. This forces the criminals to strike that night. But Chan hadn't counted on the use of explosives. He, Tommy, and Birmingham are trapped in an underground cave-in. Charlie taps into the underground phone lines and sends a morse code message. Police swarm the underground tunnels and arrest the robbery gang.

Freed from the cave-in, Charlie exposes two identities. Chief Bank Guard John Adams is revealed to be the escaped Jan Van Horn. But it turns out he really was innocent. The detective who framed the case against Van Horn also disappeared from Shanghai at the same time. He is revealed to be Bradford Harris, the bank vice president. And on his person is a cigarette lighter with a poison needle attachment, which he used to murder Detective Larkin.

== Cast ==
- Sidney Toler as Charlie Chan
- Mantan Moreland as Birmingham Brown
- Benson Fong as Tommy Chan
- James Cardwell as Ned Stewart
- Joan Barclay as Paula Webb (alias of Paula van Horn, daughter of Jan van Horn)
- Addison Richards as John Adams (alias Jan van Horn), Sixth National Bank guard
- Arthur Loft as Bradford Harris (alias Special Agent Hume)
- Janet Warren as Record Machine Operator
- Gene Stutenroth as Morgan, a gangster
- Cyril Delevanti as Detective Larkin, a police undercover officer at the Sixth National Bank
- George Chandler Joe Nelson, coffee shop proprietor
- James Flavin H.R. Jarvis, chemical engineer
- John Goldsworthy as Inspector Mainwaring
- Walter Fenner as Inspector Davis
- Mary Moore as Clerk in Laundry
- Stephen Gregory as Samuel Black, the third victim
