= Milton Raison =

American screenwriter

- Born: August 30, 1903; Vyatka, Russian Empire
- Died: June 20, 1982 (aged 78); North Hollywood, California, United States
- Occupation: Screenwriter
- Years active: 1933–1960

Milton Michael Raison (1903–1982) was an American screenwriter for both film and television. He was also known as George Milton, George Wallace Sayre, and George Sayre. His first credit was Air Hostess in 1933, which he co-wrote with Keene Thompson. Over the next 20 years, he wrote the screenplay, story, or both for over 70 films. With the advent of television, he also worked on several TV shows during the 1950s.

His credits during the 1930s include Strictly Dynamite (1934), The Shadow (1937), Torture Ship (1939), and The Man They Could Not Hang (1939). His 1940s credits include Tumbledown Ranch in Arizona (1941), Sheriff of Sage Valley (1942), Anna May Wong's last starring role in 1943's Lady from Chungking, The Contender (1944), Alaska (1944), Forever Yours (1945), the 1945 Charlie Chan film, The Shanghai Cobra, and Rocky (1948). In the 1950s he penned A Modern Marriage (1950), Southside 1-1000, Topeka (1953), The Homesteaders, and his final film credit, 1953's Old Overland Trail. In 1962 he received a story credit when A Modern Marriage was re-made as Frigid Wife.

His first television credit was in 1952, when he wrote an episode of Boston Blackie. Other television credits include The Adventures of Kit Carson, The Roy Rogers Show, and The Millionaire. His final credit was in 1960 on The Texan.

He died on June 20, 1982 in North Hollywood, California.

== Filmography ==
(Per AFI database)

- Big Time or Bust (1933) - screenplay
- Reform Girl (1933) - adaptation
- Air Hostess (1933) - screenplay
- Strictly Dynamite (1934) - additional dialogue
- The Code of the Mounted (1935) - story, adaptation
- Racing Luck (1935) - story, screenplay
- Song of the Trail (1936) - screenplay
- Go-Get-'Em-Haines (1936) - original story, adaptation
- Flying Hostess (1936) - original story
- Country Gentlemen (1936) - story
- The Shadow (1937) - story
- Mis Dos Amore (1938) - screenplay
- Torture Ship (1939) - screenplay
- The Man They Could Not Hang (1939) - story
- Girl from Rio (1939) - original screenplay
- Undercover Agent (1939) - screenplay
- Am I Guilty? (1940) - adaptation
- West of Carson (1940) - screenplay
- Murder on the Yukon (1940) - screenplay
- Double Cross (1941) - screenplay
- Tumbledown Ranch in Arizona (1941) - original story
- Sheriff of Sage Valley (1942) - original screenplay
- Secrets of a Co-Ed (1942) - original screenplay
- Billy the Kid's Smoking Guns (1942) - original screenplay
- Rolling Down the Great Divide (1942) - original screenplay
- Jungle Siren (1942) - original story
- Unseen Enemy (1942) - concept
- Bombs Over Burma (1942) - original screenplay
- Lady from Chungking (1942) - original story
- Queen of Broadway (1943) - original story
- Wings Over the Pacific (1943) - original screenplay
- Nearly Eighteen (1943) - screenplay
- The Renegades (1943) - original story
- Fugitive of the Plains (1943) - original screenplay
- Where Are Your Children? (1943) - screenplay
- The Sultan's Daughter (1944) - original screenplay
- The Contender (1944) - original story
- Wild Horse Phantom (1944) - original story, screenplay
- Alaska (1944) - screenplay
- His Brother's Ghost (1945) - story, screenplay
- Black Market Babies (1945) - screenplay
- Border Badmen (1945) - story, screenplay
- Forever Yours (1945) - original screenplay
- The Shanghai Cobra (1945) - screenplay
- High Powered (1945) - screenplay
- The Phantom of 42nd Street (1945) - screenplay
- Secrets of a Sorority Girl (1946) - original story
- Terrors on Horseback (1946) - story, screenplay
- The Mysterious Mr. Valentine (1946) - original screenplay
- Spoilers of the North (1947) - original screenplay
- Web of Danger (1947) - original screenplay
- Stage Struck (1948) - screenplay
- Rocky (1948) - original story
- Big Town Scandal (1948) - original screenplay
- Mr. Reckless (1948) - original screenplay
- Speed to Spare (1948) - original screenplay
- Dynamite (1949) - original screenplay
- State Department File 649 (1949) - original story, screenplay
- The Lawton Story (1949) - screenplay
- Special Agent (1949) - concept
- A Modern Marriage (1950) - screenplay
- Southside 1-1000 (1950) - story
- Western Pacific Agent (1950) - story
- Street Bandits (1951) - screenplay
- Old Oklahoma Plains (1952) - screenplay
- Topeka (1953) - writer
- The Homesteaders (1953) - writer
- Old Overland Trail (1953) - writer
- Frigid Wife (1962) - screenplay from A Modern Marriage
