= Daredevils of the Clouds =

1948 film by George Blair

- Theatrical poster
- Directed by: George Blair
- Written by: Ronald Davidson (story); Norman S. Hall (screenplay)
- Produced by: Stephen Auer
- Starring: Robert Livingston; Mae Clarke; James Cardwell
- Cinematography: John MacBurnie
- Edited by: Richard L. Van Enger
- Music by: Morton Scott
- Production company: Republic Pictures
- Distributed by: Republic Pictures
- Release date: June 26, 1948
- Running time: 60 minutes
- Country: United States
- Language: English

Daredevils of the Clouds (aka Daredevils of the Sky) is a 1948 American drama film directed by George Blair and produced by Republic Pictures. The film stars Robert Livingston, Mae Clarke and James Cardwell. Daredevils of the Clouds depicts bush pilot flying in northern Canada.

== Plot ==
Trans-Global Airlines president Douglas Harrison (Pierre Watkin) wants to force Terry O'Rourke (Robert Livingston), and his rival Polar Airways out of business. Harrison connives Kay Cameron (Mae Clarke) to infiltrate O'Rourke's Edmonton, Alberta headquarters. Sgt. Dixon (Hugh Prosser) of the Canadian Air Patrol discovers she and Harrison's company pilot, Johnny Martin (James Cardwell), were involved in a scheme to ruin O'Rourke.

== Cast ==
- Robert Livingston as Terry O'Rourke
- Mae Clarke as Kay Cameron
- James Cardwell as Johnny Martin
- Grant Withers as Matt Conroy
- Edward Gargan as "Tap-It" Bowers
- Ray Teal as Jim Mitchell
- Jimmie Dodd as Eddy Clark
- Pierre Watkin as Douglas Harrison
- Jayne Hazard as Mollie
- Robert J. Wilke as Joe (credited as Bob Wilke)
- Frank Melton as Frank
- Russell Arms as Jimmy Travis
- Hugh Prosser as RCMP Sergeant Dixon
- Charles Sullivan as Bartender Charlie

== Production ==
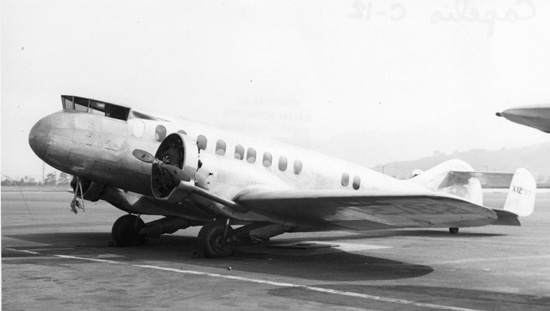
The Capelis XC-12 as a movie prop was used in numerous films including Daredevils of the Clouds.

Under the working title, Daredevils of the Sky, principal photography began in mid-February 1948 at the Republic Pictures Corp. studio and backlots, Los Angeles, California. (Note: Daredevils of the Clouds was likely filmed at the RKO Forty Acres backlot, but is not listed in the "known productions".)

The Capelis XC-12 was featured as a prop,

== Reception ==
Daredevils of the Clouds, was primarily a B film. Aviation film historian Stephen Pendo characterized the film as "tedious" with the flying scenes, "routine".

Actor-comedian Chris Elliott kept a vintage Daredevils of the Clouds poster in his office when he was a writer on Late Night with David Letterman. It appears as a prop decoration in his first two appearances as "The Guy Under The Seats" on "Late Night" in early 1984.
