= Five Came Back =

1939 film by John Farrow

- Theatrical release poster
- Directed by: John Farrow
- Written by: Jerry Cady; Dalton Trumbo; Nathanael West
- Based on: story by Richard Carroll
- Produced by: Robert Sisk
- Starring: Chester Morris; Lucille Ball; Wendy Barrie; John Carradine; Allen Jenkins; Joseph Calleia; C. Aubrey Smith; Kent Taylor; Patric Knowles; Elisabeth Risdon; Casey Johnson; Dick Hogan
- Cinematography: Nicholas Musuraca
- Edited by: Harry Marker
- Music by: Roy Webb
- Color process: Black and white
- Production company: RKO Radio Pictures
- Distributed by: RKO Radio Pictures
- Release date: June 23, 1939
- Running time: 73 minutes
- Country: United States
- Language: English
- Budget: $225,000
- Box office: $721,000

Five Came Back is a 1939 American black-and-white melodrama from RKO Radio Pictures produced by Robert Sisk, directed by John Farrow, written by Jerry Cady, Dalton Trumbo, and Nathanael West, and starring Chester Morris and Lucille Ball. The film was photographed by cinematographer Nicholas Musuraca. Although considered a B movie, the positive notices received by Ball helped launch her career as an A-list actress. Five Came Back is considered a precursor of the disaster film genre. The supporting cast features Wendy Barrie, John Carradine, C. Aubrey Smith, Kent Taylor, and Patric Knowles.

In 1948, Five Came Back was remade (differing only in minor details) as the Mexican film Los que volvieron and again in 1956 by producer-director Farrow as Back from Eternity, starring Robert Ryan, Anita Ekberg and Rod Steiger.

== Plot ==
Nine passengers board a commercial flight from Los Angeles to Panama City: wealthy Judson Ellis and Alice Melhorne, eloping because their parents disapprove; an elderly couple, Professor Henry Spengler and his wife Martha; Tommy Mulvaney, the young son of a gangster, and his escort, gunman Pete; Peggy Nolan, a woman with a shady past; and Vasquez, an anarchist being extradited and facing a death sentence for killing a high-ranking politician, and his guard, Crimp. The crew consists of pilot Bill, co-pilot Joe Brooks, and steward Larry.

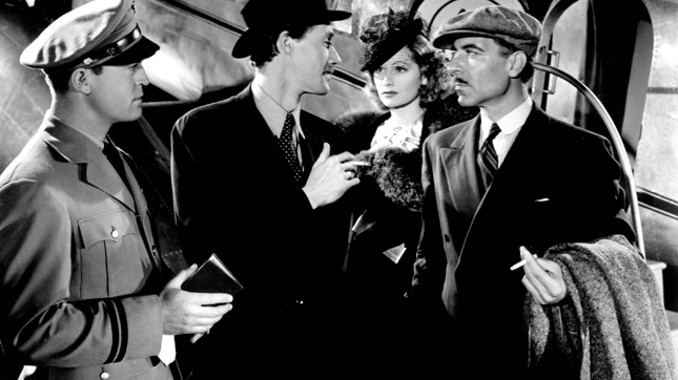
From left to right: Chester Morris, John Carradine, Lucille Ball and Joseph Calleia in Five Came Back

On their way to Panama, a fierce nighttime storm buffets their airliner, The Silver Queen. A compressed gas cylinder is shaken loose and knocks a door open. Tommy falls near the door; Larry grabs the child and hands him to a passenger, but the plane lurches and Larry falls out the door. An engine fails and the pilots are forced to crash-land in a jungle. In the morning, the professor recognizes plants of the Amazon rainforest: the aircraft has been blown far south of where rescuers will search; the nearest civilization is across the mountains. Weeks go by while Bill and Joe struggle to repair the damaged airliner. The experience changes everyone. The Spenglers rediscover their love for each other. Bill warms to an appreciative Peggy, although she tells him about her sordid past. Judson falls apart, staying drunk much of the time, while Alice toughens up and begins to feel attracted to Joe. Vasquez, seeing how well most of the group are coping with their situation, reconsiders his radical beliefs.

On the 23rd day, Crimp disappears; Tommy eventually discovers his dead body. When Peggy and Pete go looking for Tommy, he leads them to Crimp, killed by a poison dart. Pete orders Peggy to take Tommy to safety while he covers their retreat. He is killed by the unseen natives. The remaining survivors board the now-repaired airliner, but as the engines turn over, the oil line in one engine starts leaking. Bill and Joe patch the leak, but inform the others that the patch will fail sometime after takeoff, leaving only one running engine. As a result, the aircraft can only carry four adults and Tommy across the mountains. Vasquez suddenly grabs a pistol and announces that he will choose who goes, since he is doomed either way and is therefore the only one without bias. While the repairs are being made, Professor Spengler tells Vasquez that he and his wife volunteer to stay, as they have only a few years left anyway. Judson, on the other hand, tries to bribe Vasquez by offering to pay for a top lawyer.

When the aircraft is ready, Vasquez announces that both pilots, the two young women and Tommy will go. Judson attacks him, and in the struggle Vasquez shoots him dead. The airliner takes off, leaving behind Vasquez and the Spenglers. As the natives approach, Professor Spengler quietly informs Vasquez that they must not be taken alive, as they will be tortured. Vasquez lies to him, telling him that there are three bullets left. He kills the couple with his last two bullets, then awaits his grisly fate.

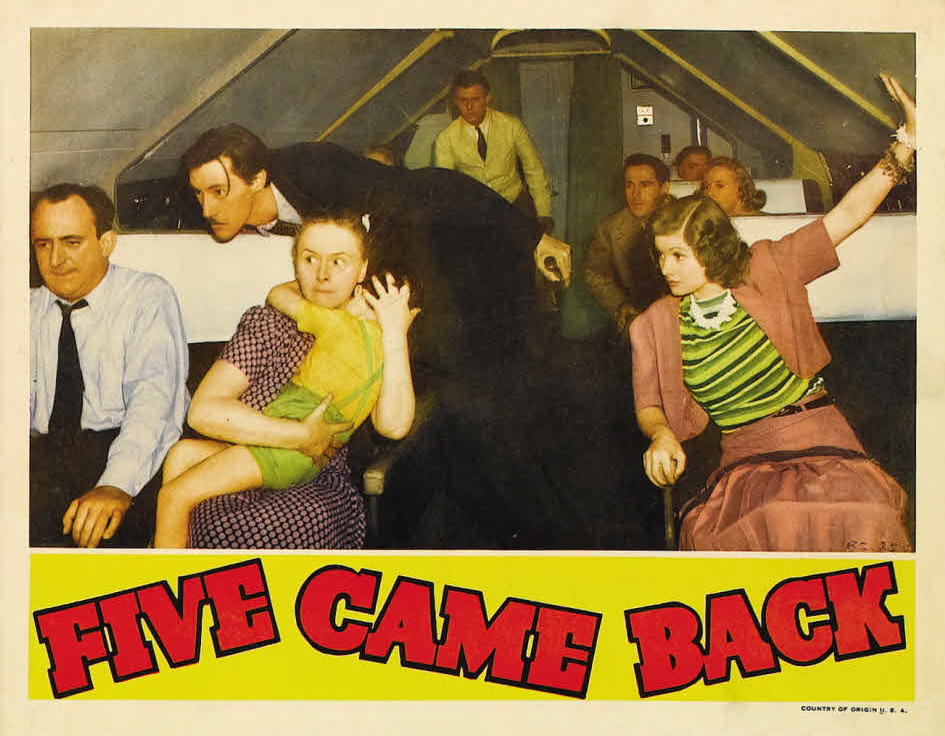

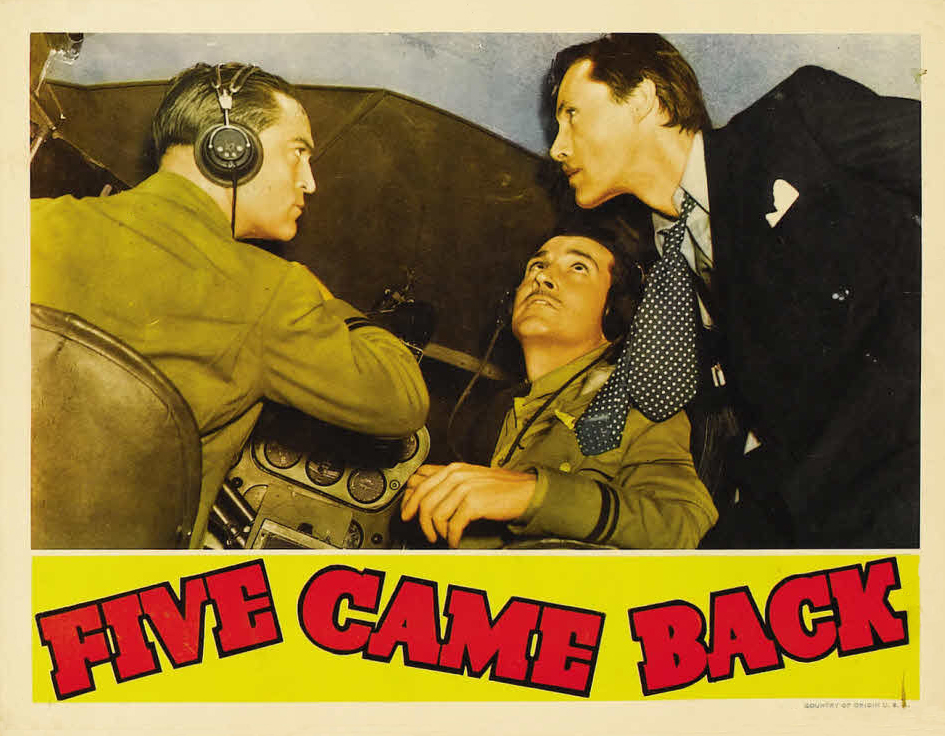

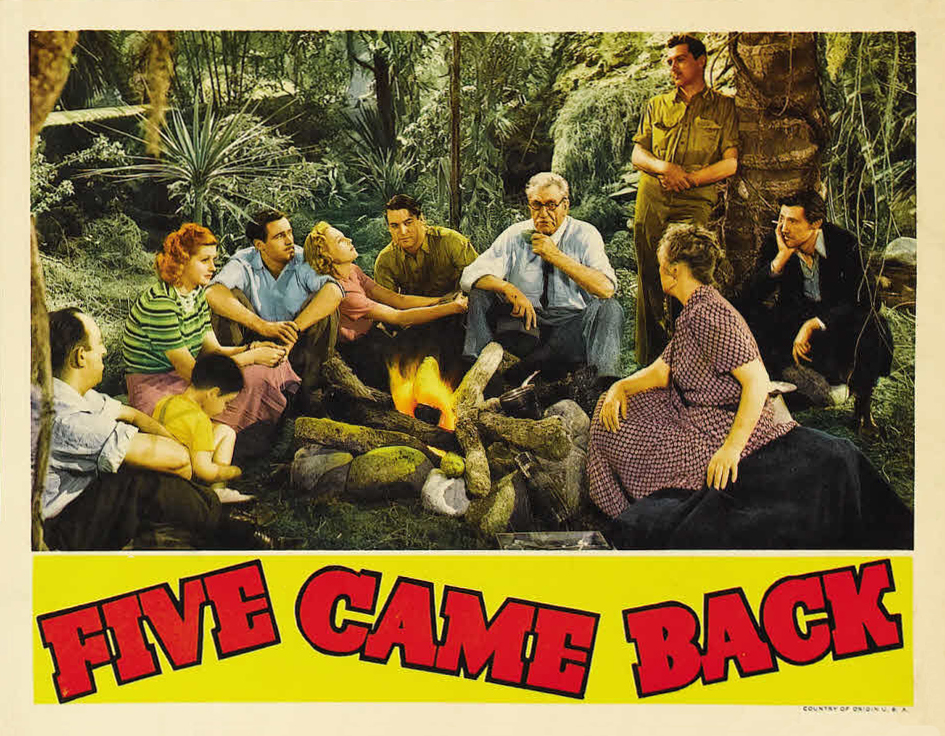

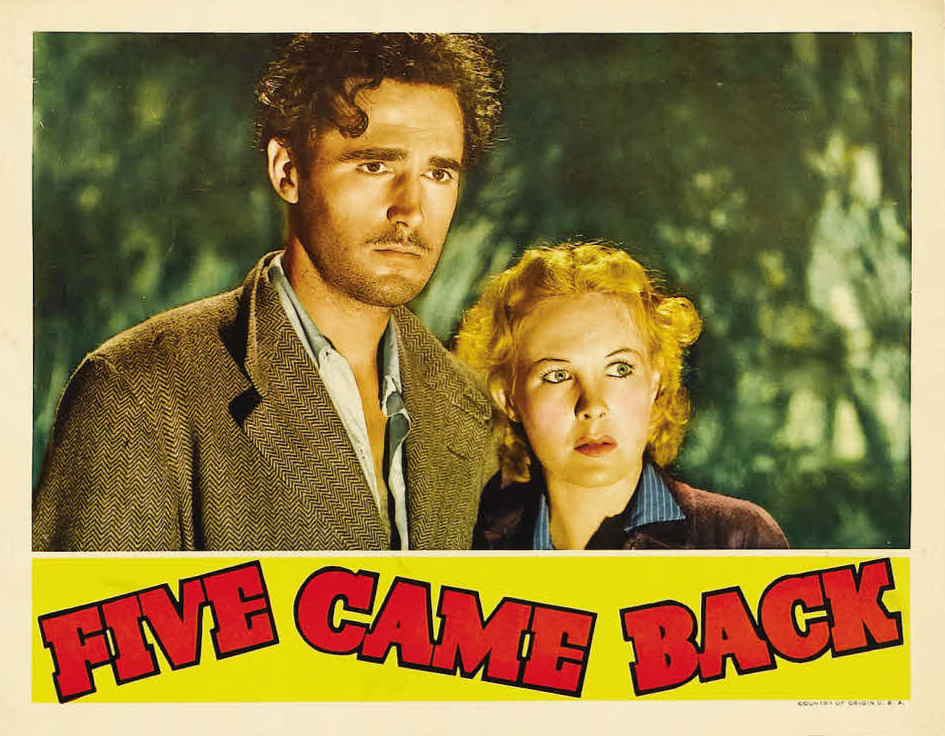

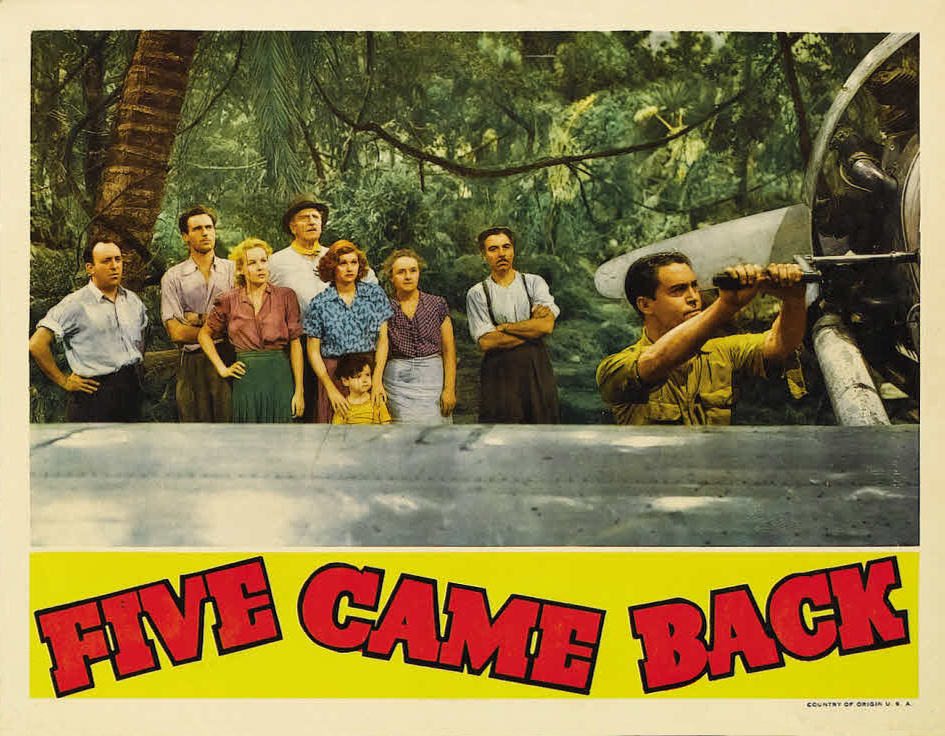

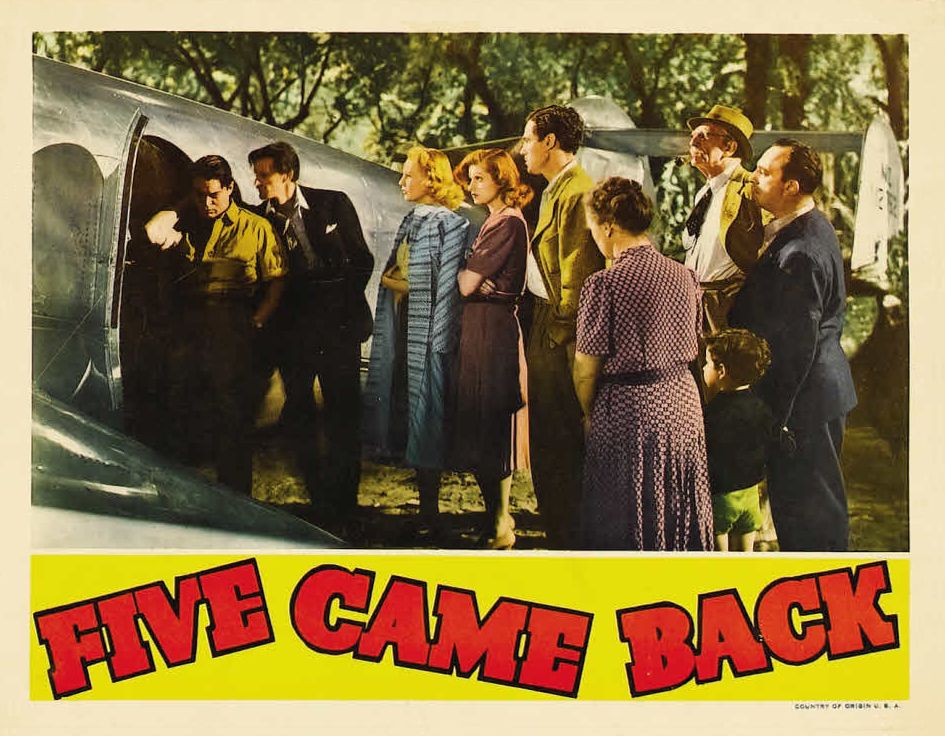

== Cast ==
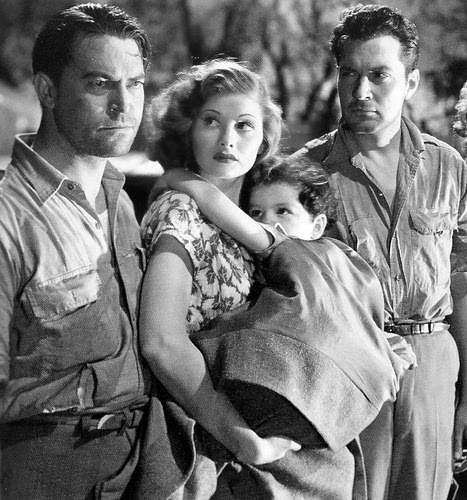
Chester Morris, Lucille Ball, Casey Johnson and Kent Taylor in Five Came Back

- Chester Morris as Bill
- Lucille Ball as Peggy Nolan
- Wendy Barrie as Alice Melhorne
- John Carradine as Crimp
- Allen Jenkins as Pete
- Joseph Calleia as Vasquez
- C. Aubrey Smith as Professor Henry Spengler
- Kent Taylor as Joe Brooks
- Patric Knowles as Judson Ellis
- Elisabeth Risdon as Martha Spengler
- Casey Johnson as Tommy Mulvaney
- Dick Hogan as Larry

== Production ==
=== Development ===
The film was based on an original story by former journalist Richard Carroll. The studio bought it on 12 April 1938 and said it would be a "probable vehicle" for Cary Grant. However, Five Came Back wound up being made as a B picture, albeit a higher budgeted one than normal films of the type. In August 1938 it was announced as part of RKO's schedule for the following year.

Victor McLaglen and Charles Coburn were originally announced as cast members. Eventually, John Carradine was borrowed from 20th Century Fox and Allen Jenkins from Warner Bros. C. Aubrey Smith and Joseph Calleia were also cast. Lucille Ball, Patric Knowles, and Kent Taylor were last-minute replacements for Ann Sothern, Alan Marshall, and Alan Baxter.

=== Shooting ===
Principal photography took place from March 30, to April 26, 1939. The total budget was $225,000.

Although primarily filmed on a back lot, Five Came Back overcame some of the limitations of its low budget. Farrow insisted on a realistic jungle environment, and had trees imported to flesh out the jungle landscape on the sound stage. Ball was reportedly upset by unwanted advances from Morris, and clashed with director Farrow over his harsh tactics. When two black widow spiders dropped out of a tree onto Ball's head, she became extremely upset and left the set screaming. Production was also delayed by a rainstorm and Carradine falling ill.

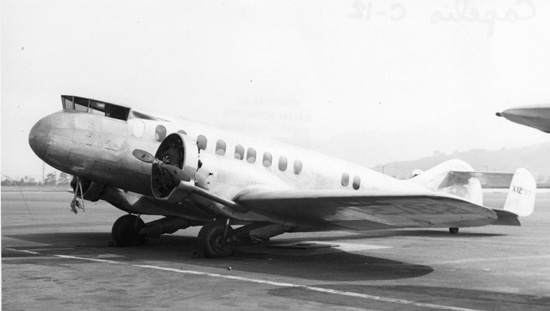
Capelis XC-12

The transport aircraft used in the film is the Capelis XC-12, built in 1933 by Capelis Safety Airplane Corporation of California, although an altogether different airplane, a Lockheed Electra, is seen in one takeoff sequence. The aircraft was a 12-seat, low-wing cabin monoplane with two 525 hp Wright Cyclone engines.

The Capelis XC-12 featured an unusual construction method with the main wing spar bolted together, and much of the metal skin attached with P-K self-tapping screws rather than rivets. These tended to vibrate loose, requiring tightening or replacing screws every few flights. After a 1938 emergency landing caused structural damage, promotional tours were quickly abandoned. The aircraft was then sold to RKO in 1939. The transport ended its career as a non-flying film prop, appearing in ground roles (in the 1942 Flying Tigers, starring John Wayne, and in other features) before reportedly being scrapped around 1950, after having slowly become a back lot relic. Flying shots in Five Came Back used an XC-12 miniature, due to the aircraft having been permanently grounded by the studio's insurance company.

== Reception ==
=== Critical ===
In his July 5, 1939, review in The New York Times, Frank Nugent praised Five Came Back as "a rousing salute to melodrama, suspenseful as a slow-burning fuse, exciting as a pinwheel, spectacularly explosive as an aerial bomb".

"Out of the enterprise comes a fine piece of work by Joseph Calleia", wrote critic Wood Soanes, "an actor who was taken from the stage after several excellent characterizations and who has been given little chance to show his stuff on the screen. Because Five Came Back was obviously not viewed as an epic while in the making and was, consequently, not subjected to high-powered studio supervision, Calleia managed to get in a splendid character study". Critics also singled out Ball's performance, which led to her landing more substantial roles.

Richard B. Jewell, professor of American film at the University of Southern California, wrote in The RKO Story, "In 1939, John Farrow directed one of the most exciting 'B' films in company history. Since the title indicated how many would make it out alive, audience members were kept on the edge of their seats". Jewell describes the film as "one of the very best program melodramas in RKO history".

Five Came Back was also notable for lively "street smart" dialogue attributed to its team of distinguished screenwriters. Both Cady and West were later to be nominated for Academy Awards in future projects, while Trumbo became one of Hollywood's most acclaimed screenwriters with two Oscars to his credit.

=== Box office ===
Even though the studio had planned it as a standard "B" movie, Five Came Back became a surprise hit that "quickly amassed an enthusiastic word-of-mouth campaign among moviegoers". The film, which cost $225,000 to make, eventually earned $262,000 in profits".

=== Legacy ===
Five Came Back has often been appraised as one of the best and most influential "B" pictures of the era. The film is widely viewed as having paved the way for disaster epics of the 1970s, like Airport and The Poseidon Adventure. Five Came Back also served as a partial inspiration for the popular TV sitcom Gilligan's Island.

Five Came Back was admired by Buddy De Sylva at Paramount, who later put Farrow under contract and gave him A-picture assignments. After leaving Paramount and freelancing, Farrow returned to RKO for a three-picture deal. His first film under the deal was a remake of Five Came Back, retitled Back from Eternity; it was released in 1956, shortly before the studio ceased operations.

The film is also credited as inspiring the 1967 Star Trek episode "The Galileo Seven". Star Trek was produced by Ball through Desilu, and filmed on the old RKO lot.

== Home media ==
Five Came Back was released on DVD by the Warner Archive Collection in June 2015.

== See also ==
- Survival film, about the film genre, with a list of related films
