= Flying Tigers (film) =

1942 black-and-white war film directed by David Miller

- Theatrical release half-sheet display poster/Lobby card
- Directed by: David Miller
- Written by: Kenneth Gamet; Barry Trivers
- Produced by: Edmund Grainger
- Starring: John Wayne; John Carroll; Anna Lee; Paul Kelly; Gordon Jones; Mae Clarke; Bill Shirley
- Cinematography: Jack A. Marta
- Edited by: Ernest J. Nims
- Music by: Victor Young
- Production company: Republic Pictures
- Release date: October 8, 1942 (United States)
- Running time: 102 minutes
- Country: United States
- Languages: English, Japanese, Cantonese
- Budget: $900,000 or $397,690
- Box office: $1.5 million (US rentals)

Flying Tigers (a.k.a. Yank Over Singapore and Yanks Over the Burma Road) is a 1942 American black-and-white war film drama from Republic Pictures that was produced by Edmund Grainger, directed by David Miller, and stars John Wayne, John Carroll, and Anna Lee.

Flying Tigers dramatizes the exploits of the American Volunteer Group (AVG), Americans who fought the Japanese in China during World War II. The movie portrays them as fighting before U.S. entry into the war but, in point of fact, they did not see action until after the attack on Pearl Harbor. It is unabashedly a wartime propaganda film that was well received by a 1940s audience looking for a patriotic "flagwaver".

== Plot ==
Jim Gordon leads the Flying Tigers, a squadron of volunteer American pilots who fly Curtiss P-40C fighters against Japanese aircraft in the skies over China during the Second Sino-Japanese War. The pilots are a mixed bunch, motivated by money (they receive a bounty for each aircraft shot down) or just by the thrill of aerial combat.

One day, Jim's old friend Woody Jason shows up. An arrogant, hot-shot aviator, he starts causing trouble immediately. When the Japanese raid the Flying Tigers' airbase, the new arrival goes after them, taking up a P-40 fighter without permission, not realizing until too late that it has no ammunition. As a result, Woody is shot down. He is unharmed, but the precious fighter is a total wreck. As time goes on, Woody shows that he has little use for teamwork, alienating and endangering the other pilots. He abandons his wingman, Blackie Bales, in order to shoot down a Japanese aircraft. As a result, Blackie is attacked and bails out of his burning P-40. While hanging suspended in his parachute, he is strafed and killed by the Japanese pilot (this fate befell real AVG pilot Bert Christman).

Woody starts romancing nurse Brooke Elliott, who is considered by all the Tiger pilots to be Jim's girlfriend. One night, they go on a date. When he is late getting back for a night patrol, Jim's right-hand man, "Hap" Davis, secretly takes his place, despite having just been grounded by Jim because his vision had deteriorated, especially at night. In the resulting dogfight, Hap is unable to judge distances accurately and winds up dying in a collision with a Japanese aircraft he is pursuing. This proves to be the final straw; Jim fires Woody, telling him "It's out of my hands now. None of these men will ever fly with you again. And they have to fly." The date is Sunday, December 7, 1941, the day of the Japanese attack on Pearl Harbor, bringing America into World War II.

A day later, Jim is notified that a vital bridge must be destroyed. The target is so heavily defended that the only chance of success is to fly in very low with a single, unescorted bomber and hope not to be spotted; it is likely a suicide mission. Jim volunteers to fly the bomber, but Woody invites himself along at the last second, much to Jim's irritation. They destroy the bridge too late to keep a crucial enemy supply train from crossing. The bomber is hit by flak and catches fire. Jim bails out (with an unexpected push from Woody), expecting Woody to follow. Woody, however, has concealed the fact that he has been wounded by flak. He crashes into the train, destroying it at the cost of his own life.

== Cast ==
As appearing in Flying Tigers, (main roles and screen credits identified):

- John Wayne as Capt. Jim Gordon
- John Carroll as Woodrow "Woody" Jason
- Anna Lee as Brooke Elliott
- Paul Kelly as "Hap" Davis
- Gordon Jones as "Alabama" Smith
- Mae Clarke as Verna Bales
- Addison Richards as Col. R.T. Lindsay
- Edmund MacDonald as "Blackie" Bales
- Bill Shirley as Dale
- Tom Neal as Reardon
- Malcolm "Bud" McTaggart as McCurdy
- David Bruce as Lt. Barton
- Chester Gan as Mike, Mechanic
- Jimmie Dodd as "Mac" McIntosh (credited as James Dodd)
- Gregg Barton as "Tex" Norton
- Richard Loo as Dr. Tsing (uncredited)
- Charles Lane as Mr. Repkin (uncredited)
- Tom Seidel as Barratt (uncredited)

Curtiss-Wright test pilots flew P-40E fighters in the live action aerial scenes.

== Production ==
Former Flying Tigers Lawrence Moore (who was a clerk) and Kenneth Sanger (who worked in communications) served as technical advisers on Flying Tigers. Both had left the American Volunteer Group (AVG) in February 1942. None of the real pilots are mentioned by name in the film, which went into production while the original AVG was still in operation.

While archival combat footage was used in some of the scenes, miniatures were used to portray the early model Curtiss P-40 WarhawkB/C Tomahawks that the Tigers flew on screen. For all ground shots, full-size P-40 mockups were used that did no more than taxi. They were propelled by V-8 automobile engines, and the elevators and ailerons were missing from their wings and rear horizontal stabilizers. John Carroll's character arrives at the Tigers' airbase on the one-off Capelis XC-12, a failed 1933 twin-engine transport aircraft that found new life at RKO as a non-flying movie prop. The aircraft was also used in Five Came Back and other films.

The American and Japanese aerial combat footage in Flying Tigers were actually miniatures being pulled along on wires off-screen, created by Republic's special effect experts Howard and Theodore Lydecker. This also included the miniature train and bridge sequence in the film's climax, as well as the miniature of the Capelis air transport seen flying through canyons and eventually crashing into the train. Flying Tigers's special effects were nominated for an Academy Award, but many voters did not realize that some of the "aircraft" were actually miniatures, thereby passing the film by for the Oscar.

In 1942, due to wartime priorities that prohibited the use of U. S. military aircraft for Hollywood productions, Republic Studios approached Curtiss-Wright in Buffalo to recreate the aerial battle sequences required for Flying Tigers. A number of P-40F fighter aircraft waiting for delivery to the U. S. Army Air Forces were repainted in American Volunteer Group (AVG) markings, and with the aid of Curtiss test pilots, flew in the film. Chief Production Test Pilot Herbert O. Fisher's screen role was substituting for John Wayne.

Plot and character elements were lifted wholesale from the 1939 film Only Angels Have Wings without any acknowledgement, leading some to suggest that Angels director Howard Hawks should sue.

Flying Tigers was originally going to be called Yanks Over the Burma Road, but was changed because of MGM's film A Yank on the Burma Road.

Republic Pictures provided a larger budget than normal for the film, borrowing John Carroll and David Miller from MGM. In exchange MGM got an option on John Wayne's services.

Filming began in April 1942.

=== Historical accuracy ===
Flying Tigers only loosely represents the story of the real American Volunteer Group (AVG). Unlike the film characters, all AVG pilots were recruited from active or reserve U. S. military forces, were in Asia with the tacit approval of the U. S. government, and did not see combat before the Japanese attack on Pearl Harbor. The first AVG combat mission was December 20, 1941, nearly two weeks after the Pearl Harbor attack. (AVG commander Chennault, however, had seen combat during his prior Chinese service.)

John Wayne's character is nicknamed "Pappy", a common nickname for older military commanders. This was also the nickname of Gregory Boyington, a United States Marine Corps pilot who flew with the AVG until early 1942. Wayne's character, however, was not based on Boyington, who was not the commander of the AVG, and not known as "Pappy" until he commanded VMF-214 in late 1943.

The aviation goggles worn by John Wayne on screen and seen on RKO promotional posters were actually a set of repurposed tank crew goggles.

The footage of Japanese soldiers firing anti-aircraft guns during the bridge bombing sequence was actually of Chinese soldiers. They are wearing M1935 Stahlhelm German army-style helmets, only used by elements of the Chinese Army and not by the Japanese.

The death of Blackie Bales in Flying Tigers is based on a real AVG combat incident. On January 23, 1942, Flying Tiger Bert Christman's fighter was hit in the engine, and he had to bail out. While descending to the ground in his parachute, he was strafed and killed by a Japanese fighter (Christman was hit in several places and probably died as a bullet passed through the back of his neck). The cruel manner of Christman's death was widely publicized in 1942. The Associated Press published an illustrated feature article about it, and Paramount Pictures made a short documentary about his life. Later in the year, Christman was featured in war bond advertisements that read, "He gave his life. What will you give?"

== Reception ==
Coming out just after the United States entered the war, Flying Tigers was well received by both public and critics alike, mainly because of the exciting flying scenes. The New York Times said, "On a patch-work story frame, Republic Pictures has strung a first-rate aerial circus chock-full of exciting dogfights." The review in Variety was more exacting, commenting, "Handicapped primarily by a threadbare script, production also suffers from slow pacing while John Wayne, John Carroll, Anna Lee and Paul Kelly are barely adequate in the major acting assignments. Some of the scenes look repetitious, the same Jap flyers apparently being shot down and killed three or four times over."

Flying Tigers was the first Republic film to make more than $1 million.

== Proposed sequel ==
Republic announced plans for a never-made sequel, Sky Dragons, which would have starred Wayne and Lee.

== Oscar nominations ==
Howard Lydecker (photographic) and Daniel J. Bloomberg (sound) were nominated for the Academy Award for Best Effects, Special Effects; Victor Young for Best Music; Daniel J. Bloomberg for Best Sound, Recording.

== See also ==
- John Wayne filmography
