= Across the Wide Missouri (film) =

1951 film by William A. Wellman

- Theatrical release poster
- Directed by: William A. Wellman
- Screenplay by: Talbot Jennings
- Story by: Talbot Jennings; Frank Cavett
- Based on: Across the Wide Missouri; 1947 novel by Bernard DeVoto
- Produced by: Robert Sisk
- Starring: Clark Gable; John Hodiak; Ricardo Montalbán; James Whitmore; María Elena Marqués
- Narrated by: Howard Keel
- Cinematography: William C. Mellor
- Edited by: John Dunning
- Music by: David Raksin
- Production company: Metro-Goldwyn-Mayer
- Distributed by: Loew's Inc.
- Release date: October 26, 1951
- Running time: 78 minutes
- Country: United States
- Languages: English, Chinuk Wawa
- Budget: $2,220,000
- Box office: $4,601,000

Across the Wide Missouri is a 1951 American Technicolor Western film directed by William A. Wellman and starring Clark Gable, Ricardo Montalbán, John Hodiak and James Whitmore. The screenplay is based on historian Bernard DeVoto's eponymous 1947 book and dramatizes an account of several fur traders and their interaction with the local Indians.

== Plot ==
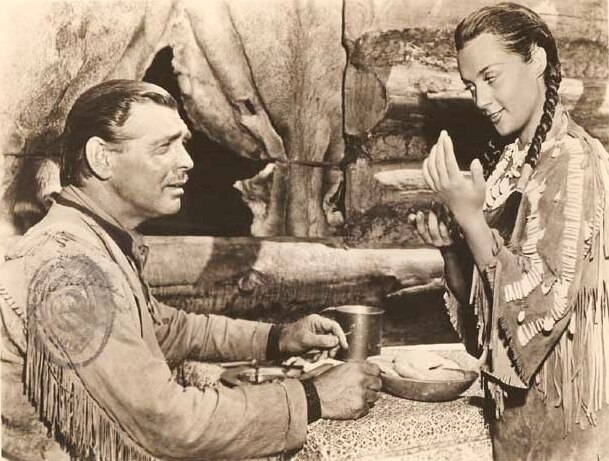
Clark Gable and María Elena Marqués in Across the Wide Missouri

In the 1830s in the Rocky Mountains, fur trapper Flint Mitchell meets with other mountain men, selling his furs, drinking and enjoying contests with his friends. He organizes a hunting brigade into the beaver-rich Blackfoot territory, buying horses and recruiting trappers, despite protests from his Scottish friend and former trading partner Brecan, who lives among the Blackfoot and warns him that the land belongs to them. Flint outbids Brecan for Kamiah, the granddaughter of Blackfoot medicine man Bear Ghost and adopted daughter of a Nez Perce chief, Looking Glass. Brecan wants to return her to the Blackfoot to promote peace between the tribes, while Flint wants to marry Kamiah and ensure the brigade's safety.

French Canadian trapper Pierre and Scotch captain Humberstone Lyon, who fought in the Battle of Waterloo, join Flint on the dangerous expedition. Kamiah successfully guides Flint and his men on their trek through the high passes filled with crippling snow drifts and delivers them to the Blackfoot territory, where they build a stockade. Flint narrowly escapes capture and death at the hands of Ironshirt, a young Blackfoot prince and war chief, who kills Baptiste DuNord, one of Flint's best trappers. Ironshirt steals the brigade's horses, but Flint impresses Bear Ghost, who orders them to be returned.

Although he marries Kamiah for reasons other than love and cannot speak her language, Flint falls in love with her. As Flint and Kamiah grow closer, Flint and Bear Ghost become close friends. Bear Ghost prevents Ironshirt from harming Flint and his men, but catastrophe strikes when Roy DuNord, another of Flint's men, kills Bear Ghost to avenge his brother's death. Although Brecan kills Roy and Flint grieves over the death of Bear Ghost, Ironshirt succeeds Bear Ghost as chief and resumes his campaign to drive the trappers out of his country.

In the spring, Kamiah gives birth to a boy named Chip. The brigade is attacked by a large war party led by Ironshirt, and Kamiah is killed. With Chip strapped to its back, Kamiah's horse bolts during the attack and is chased by Ironshirt, who is intent on killing Chip. Flint manages to kill Ironshirt and rescue his son.

As the years pass, Flint takes Chip to live in the Blackfoot camp, where he believes that Kamiah would have wanted him. Although Flint intends to have Chip formally educated in the East, Chip persuades him each year to postpone his schooling, and he learns the ways of the mountains from his father.

== Cast ==
- Clark Gable as Flint Mitchell
- Ricardo Montalbán as Ironshirt (Blackfoot war chief)
- John Hodiak as Brecan
- Adolphe Menjou as Pierre (French trapper)
- J. Carrol Naish as Looking Glass (Nez Perce chief)
- Jack Holt as Bear Ghost (Blackfoot medicine man)
- Alan Napier as Capt. Humberstone Lyon
- George Chandler as Gowie (Lyon's assistant)
- Richard Anderson as Dick Richardson
- María Elena Marqués as Kamiah (Blackfoot princess)
- Howard Keel as Narrator
- James Whitmore as Old Bill
- Chief Tahachee as Indian
- Nipo T. Strongheart as Indian Chief
- Evelyn Finley as Squaw
- Bobby Barber as Gardipe
- Timothy Carey as Baptiste DuNord
- Russell Simpson as Hoback (uncredited)

== Production ==
During filming, Ricardo Montalbán was reportedly thrown from a horse, knocked unconscious and trampled by another horse, causing a spinal injury that recurred in 1993 and confined him to a wheelchair.

The film was shot largely in the Rocky Mountains, mostly at altitudes between 9,000 and 14,000 feet (2,743 and 4,267 meters), north of Durango, Colorado near Purgatory Resort and Molas Pass, the main location sites.

The narration of the adult Chip Mitchell in the film was the suggestion of MGM producer Sam Zimbalist in response to negative audience reaction about the film's excessive length. Zimbalist felt that the insertion of the narration would enable the film to be edited while maintaining the integrity of the story. Director William A. Wellman, devastated by the cuts, disowned the film.

== Music ==
The score for the film was composed and conducted by David Raksin and incorporated the song "Oh Shenandoah" in its main title and end title. Additional music was composed and adapted from Raksin's material by Al Sendrey and conducted by Johnny Green.

- "Across the Wide Missouri", words and music by Ervin Drake and Jimmy Shirl
- "Skip to My Lou"
- "Alouette, Pretty Alouette" traditionals
- "Indian Lullaby", words and music by Alberto Colombo, Indian lyrics by Nipo T. Strongheart

The complete score was issued on CD in 2009 on Film Score Monthly records.

== Reception ==
In a contemporary review for The New York Times, critic A. H. Weiler erote: "[T]he adventure, which treats the questing trappers—the 'mountain men' who broke the trails into the vast Northwest Territory during the early decades of the nineteenth century—could have been the rich substance out of which moving history was made. It is, instead, merely a halting, sometimes verbose Western, which only rarely captures the imagination and fleetingly portrays the excitement of the period or the fearless, sturdy men who were responsible for the epic story inherent in the period."

According to MGM records, the film earned $2,789,000 in the U.S. and Canada and $1,812,000 elsewhere, resulting in a profit of $635,000.

== See also ==
- Across the Wide Missouri (disambiguation)
