= Across the Wide Missouri =

Across the Wide Missouri may refer to:

- Across the Wide Missouri (book), a 1947 book by Bernard DeVoto
- Across the Wide Missouri (film), a 1951 American film based on the book
- "Oh Shenandoah" or "Across the Wide Missouri", a traditional American folk song
