= Gomen nasai =

Gomen nasai (ごめんなさい; "I am sorry") is an informal Japanese-language apology, less polite than the standard "sumimasen". It can also be shortened to gomen ne (ごめんね) or gomen (ごめん).

== Film and TV ==
- Ring of Curse, 2011 Japanese horror film, originally released as Gomen Nasai in Japan

== Music ==
- "Gomen-nasai" (song), 1951 song with music by Raymond Hattori
- "Gomennasai" (Minna no Uta song), song from TV segment Minna no Uta, 1975
- "Gomenasai" (t.A.T.u song), 2005
- "Gomenasai" (BWO song), 2008
