= María Elena Marqués =

Mexican actress and singer (1926–2008)

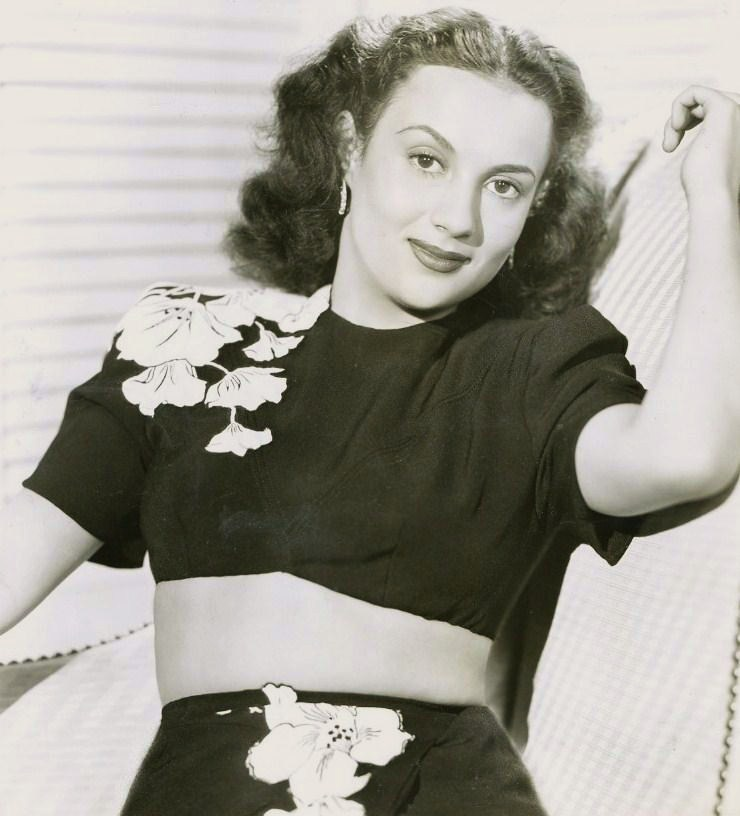
- Marqués in a publicity still for Across the Wide Missouri (1951)
- Born: María Elena Marqués Rangel; 14 December 1926; Mexico City, Mexico
- Died: 11 November 2008 (aged 81); Mexico City, Mexico
- Years active: 1942–1980
- Spouse: Miguel Torruco (1947 – 1956)

María Elena Marqués Rangel (14 December 1926 – 11 November 2008) was a Mexican actress and singer, specialized in the musical genres of ranchera and huapango.

== Biography ==
She was born on 14 December 1926 in Mexico City. She was discovered by the film director Fernando de Fuentes.

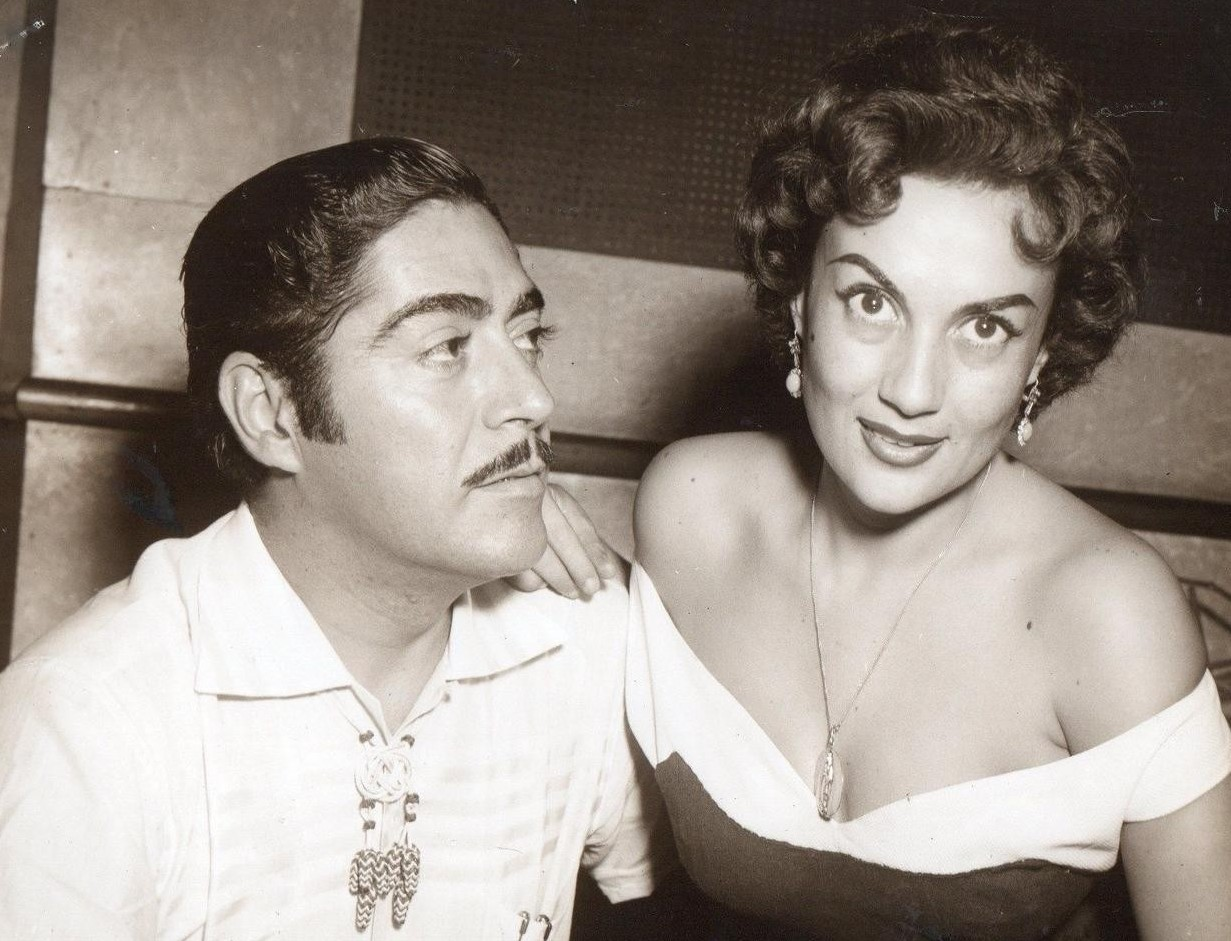
Marqués with Luis Aguilar in 1955

Her first film was Dos corazones y un tango (1942) where she performed with the Argentine tango singer Andrés Falgás. In 1943 she worked in Doña Bárbara with María Félix, Romeo y Julieta, with Cantinflas, and Así se quiere en Jalisco, with Jorge Negrete. She worked again with Negrete in Me he de comer esa tuna (1945) and Tal para cual (1951). In her best-known role, Marqués starred in the 1947 film La perla (The Pearl); she played the wife of a fisherman who finds the ill-fated pearl. The film was based on John Steinbeck's book The Pearl. The film was directed by Emilio Fernández and her co-star was Pedro Armendáriz. Marqués was directed again by Fernández in Cuando levanta la niebla (1952), Reportaje (1953) and Pueblito (1961). She worked in Hollywood in Across the Wide Missouri (1951) opposite Clark Gable, and in Ambush at Tomahawk Gap (1953), with John Hodiak.

As a singer, she recorded songs such as "Cartas marcadas", "Échame a mí la culpa", "El aguacero", "Grítenme piedras del campo", "La cigarra", "La noche de mi mal", "La Panchita", "Tres consejos" and "Tú, sólo tú", with the Mariachi Santana and the Trío Tamaulipeco.

Marqués worked on 15 radio soap operas and 30 other radio programs for XEW, acted in 20 TV theater productions and 10 telenovelas. Her last work as an actress was in the film El testamento (1981).

Marqués was married to the actor Miguel Torruco.

Marqués died of heart failure in Mexico City on 11 November 2008, with her children Marisela and Miguel Torruco Marqués at her side.

=== Politics ===
In the 1976 general election, Marqués was elected to the Chamber of Deputies for the Federal District's 7th congressional district, representing the Institutional Revolutionary Party (PRI).

== Filmography (selected) ==
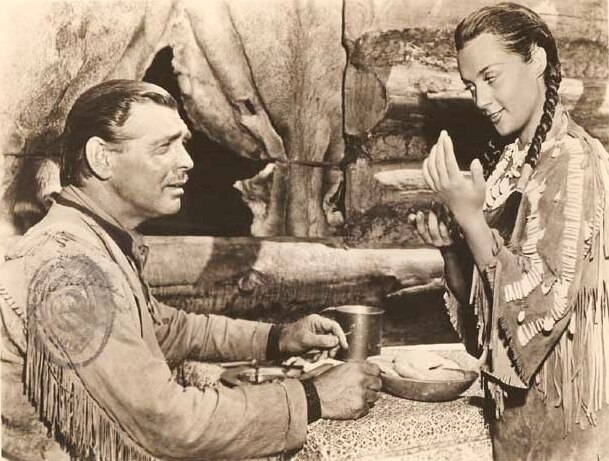
Clark Gable and Marqués in Across The Wide Missouri (1951)

- Dos corazones y un tango (1942)
- La razón de la culpa (1942)
- Así se quiere en Jalisco (1943)
- The Rebel (1943)
- Doña Bárbara (1943)
- Romeo y Julieta (1943)
- The Two Orphans (1944)
- Me he de comer esa tuna (1945)
- Caribbean Rose (1946)
- La perla (1947)
- The Newlywed Wants a House (1948)
- Black Angustias (1950)
- The Dangerous Age (1950)
- Gemma (1950)
- Yo Quiero Ser Mala (1950)
- Across the Wide Missouri (1951)
- When the Fog Lifts (1952)
- Made for Each Other (1953)
- Ambush at Tomahawk Gap (1953)
- Reportaje (1953)
- Historia de un abrigo de mink (1955)
- Así era Pancho Villa (1956)
- A Media Luz los Tres (1958)
- Pueblito (1961)
- ¿Que haremos con papá? (1968)
- El Jardín de los Cerezos (1978)
- El Testamento (1981)

=== Television ===
- Amor y orgullo (1967)

== Bibliography ==
- Agrasánchez Jr., Rogelio (2001). Bellezas del cine mexicano / Beauties of The Mexican Cinema. Archivo Fílmico Agrasánchez. ISBN 968-5077-11-8.
