= La razón de la culpa =

1942 film directed by Juan José Ortega

- Directed by: Juan José Ortega
- Written by: Catalina D'Erzel; Jaime Contreras; Ramón Pérez Peláez
- Starring: Blanca de Castejón; Andrés Soler; María Elena Marqués
- Cinematography: Jack Draper
- Edited by: Rafael Ceballos; Charles L. Kimball
- Music by: Manuel Esperón; Rafael de Paz; Agustín Lara
- Production companies: Compañía Cinematográfica Mexicana, S.A.
- Release date: 2 April 1943
- Running time: 96 minutes
- Country: Mexico
- Language: Spanish

La razón de la culpa (English: "The reason for the blame") is a 1943 Mexican film directed by Juan José Ortega who also directed Corazón salvaje. The film stars Blanca de Castejón, Andrés Soler and María Elena Marqués as well as Pedro Infante as Roberto. This was one of Ricardo Montalbán's first films.

Pedro Infante was still a novice when he was cast in the role of Roberto, a Spaniard gachupín, but it was his northern accent (Sinaloa) that caused the director Juan José Ortega to make the decision to overdub Infante's voice with that of Jesús Valero, who was from Spain. While it was Valero's speaking voice in the film, it was Infante's voice giving character to the songs he interprets. When the film was broadcast on Netflix Spain however, all the voices were overdubbed so that the accents matched those of the viewers in Spain. The role as Roberto was the only film that Infante appeared in that he portrayed a foreigner.

== Songs ==
- Rosalía
- Bendita Palabra by Agustín Lara

== Plot ==
Robert meets and falls in love with a married woman while on a transatlantic crossing from Spain to Mexico. Once in Mexico, he goes to her home and claims to be a friend of her husband Andrés and is offered lodging until he returns.

== Cast ==
- Blanca de Castejón as Maria de la Paz
- Andrés Soler as Andrés
- María Elena Marqués as Blanca
- Pedro Infante as Roberto
- Mimí Derba as Felisa, Andrés' sister
- Carolina Barret as Estela
- Jesús Graña as Colonel Alberto
- Conchita Sáenz as Sofia
- Araceli Fernández as Estela
- Roberto Cañedo
- Ricardo Montalbán
