= Ambush at Tomahawk Gap =

1953 film by Fred F. Sears

- Theatrical release poster
- Directed by: Fred F. Sears
- Written by: David Lang
- Produced by: Wallace MacDonald
- Starring: John Hodiak; John Derek; David Brian; María Elena Marqués
- Cinematography: Henry Freulich
- Edited by: Aaron Stell
- Music by: Ross DiMaggio
- Production company: Columbia Pictures
- Distributed by: Columbia Pictures
- Release date: May 5, 1953
- Running time: 73 minutes
- Country: United States
- Language: English

Ambush at Tomahawk Gap is a 1953 American Western film directed by Fred F. Sears and produced by Wallace MacDonald. It stars John Hodiak, John Derek, David Brian, and María Elena Marqués.

== Plot ==
Four outlaws have just been released from Yuma Territorial Prison. They return to Tomahawk Gap, now a ghost town, to retrieve the money that they stole and was buried by a partner somewhere in the town. While hunting, Indians attack, and a life and death battle ensues.

== Cast ==
- John Hodiak as McCord
- David Brian as Egan
- John Derek as Kid
- Ray Teal as Doc
- María Elena Marqués as Navajo Girl
- John Qualen as Jonas P. Travis
- Otto Hulett as Stranton
- Trevor Bardette as Sheriff
- Percy Helton as Marlowe
- Harry Cording as Ostler
- John Doucette as Burt
- John War Eagle as Indian Chief

== Reception ==
FilmInk called it "really good... a brutal tale full of cynical characters – kind of like a Western noir."
