= Night into Morning =

1951 film by Fletcher Markle

Night Into Morning
- Theatrical release poster
- Directed by: Fletcher Markle
- Written by: Karl Tunberg; Leonard Spigelgass
- Produced by: Edwin H. Knopf
- Starring: Ray Milland; John Hodiak; Nancy Davis; Lewis Stone; Jean Hagen
- Cinematography: George J. Folsey
- Edited by: George White; Robert Watts
- Music by: Carmen Dragon
- Production company: Metro-Goldwyn-Mayer
- Distributed by: Loew's Inc
- Release date: June 8, 1951
- Running time: 86 minutes
- Country: United States
- Language: English
- Budget: $777,000
- Box office: $819,000

Night Into Morning is a 1951 American drama film directed by Fletcher Markle and starring Ray Milland, John Hodiak and Nancy Davis.

== Plot ==
Everything is going very well for college professor Phillip Ainley, who has a loving wife and son and an offer to teach at Yale. But his world turns upside-down when Katherine Mead, his secretary, rushes to tell him that there's been a deadly explosion at the professor's home.

His wife and child are killed. Ainley, devastated, becomes morose and turns to drink, causing Mead, a war widow, and best friend Tom Lawry, her betrothed, to consider these telltale signs that the professor could be suicidal.

A popular athlete on campus has failed an exam and might not graduate, so his girlfriend Dottie appeals to the professor to give him a second chance. A drunken Ainley tells her remaining unmarried might spare them both future heartbreak. He then crashes a car, terrifying the girl and resulting in his arrest.

Character witnesses convince the judge to place Ainley on probation. The professor permits the athlete to take a second exam, then gives him a passing grade. Ainley gets his affairs in order and goes to a hotel, where he plans to take his life. Only a last-minute intervention by Mead saves him, the widow reminding Ainley that she found a new love and new life, just as her first true love would have wanted.

== Cast ==
- Ray Milland as Phillip Ainley
- John Hodiak as Tom Lawry
- Nancy Davis as Katherine Mead
- Lewis Stone as Dr. Horace Snyder
- Jean Hagen as Girl Next Door
- Rosemary De Camp as Annie Ainley
- Dawn Addams as Dotty Phelps
- Jonathan Cott as Chuck Holderson
- Celia Lovsky as Mrs. Niemoller
- Gordon Gebert as Russ Kirby
- Harry Antrim as Mr. Andersen
- Katherine Warren as Mrs. Andersen
- Mary Lawrence as Waitress
- Herb Vigran as Bartender
- Otto Waldis as Dr. Franz Niemoller
- John Maxwell as Dr. Huntington
- John Jeffery as Timmy Ainley

Uncredited (in order of appearance)
Robert Foulk	Police officer preventing Ainley from rushing into burning house
Wheaton Chambers	Cleric delivering eulogy at funeral of Ainley's wife and son
Matt Moore	Professor Joe Goodman in faculty lounge
John Eldredge	Professor in faculty lounge
Whit Bissell	Salesman assisting Ainley in picking gravestones for his wife and son
Margaret Bert	Woman choosing her lunch in the college cafeteria
Frank McGrath	Angry driver at accident scene
Howard M. Mitchell	Guard in jail where Ainley is held for drunk driving
Percy Helton	Philosophical drunk in jail cell with Ainley
Richard Hale	Judge lecturing Ainley after his arrest for drunk driving
Torben Meyer	Butcher
Mario Siletti	Tony the barber who tells Ainley that he also spent time in jail in the old country
Christopher Knopf	Photography store clerk from whom Ainley picks up developed photos
Wilton Graff	Attorney explaining to Ainley the details of setting up last will

== Release ==
According to MGM records, the movie earned $556,000 in the U.S. and Canada and $263,000 in other markets, resulting in a loss to the studio of $312,000.

== Reception ==
=== Critical response ===
Bosley Crowther of The New York Times wrote: "One of the darkest experiences that the human spirit can be forced to endure—that is, the death of a loved one and the adjustment subsequent thereto—is considered with decent compassion and simple dramatic clarity in Night Into Morning, a Metro picture which opened at Loew's State on Saturday."
