= Mission Over Korea =

1953 film by Fred F. Sears

- Theatrical poster
- Directed by: Fred F. Sears
- Screenplay by: Martin Goldsmith; Jesse Lasky Jr. Eugene Ling
- Story by: Richard Tregaskis
- Produced by: Robert Cohn (Note: Although Robert Cohn, a nephew of studio boss, Harry Cohn, is listed as producer, the film is also a product of the long-term collaboration with producer Sam Katzman.)
- Starring: John Hodiak; John Derek; Audrey Totter; Maureen O'Sullivan; Harvey Lembeck; Richard Erdman; Richard Bowers
- Cinematography: Sam Leavitt
- Edited by: Henry Batista
- Music by: Mischa Bakaleinikoff
- Production company: Robert Cohn Productions
- Distributed by: Columbia Pictures
- Release date: August 1953
- Running time: 85 minutes
- Country: United States
- Language: English

Mission Over Korea is a 1953 American war film released by Columbia Pictures, directed by Fred F. Sears, from a story by former war correspondent Richard Tregaskis, author of Guadalcanal Diary. The film stars John Hodiak, John Derek, Audrey Totter and Maureen O'Sullivan.

The Korean War provides the background, including combat footage photographed by producer Robert Cohn and a camera crew near the front lines. The prologue before the onscreen credits notes the film is "Dedicated to the Eighth United States Army, Fifth United States Air Force, Republic of Korea Army who made this film possible. To the men at Itazuki, Kwanju, Taego, Ouijanbu, Pusan, Inchon, Seoul where this story was photographed."

== Plot ==
In June 1950, while stationed at Kimpo, South Korea, Captain George Slocum finds out from his friend, Lieutenant Jerry Barker, that he has to go to Japan. At the airport, he meets Barker's younger brother, Pete, who takes up a Stinson L-5 Sentinel liaison aircraft and begins showing off. George reprimands him for careless flying, but sticks up for him when the military police want to arrest Pete.

Pete later meets Kate, an Army nurse, while George's wife Nancy, is surprised by his sudden appearance. Both pilots receive news of North Korea's attack on South Korea and are ordered to Pusan, but are diverted to Seoul. En route, they land at bombed-out Kimpo to find a critically wounded Jerry, who dies when the two aircraft are attacked on the way to safety. Pete is devastated and vows to get back at the enemy.

On another mission, in unarmed L-5s again, Pete and George are flying the U.S. ambassador and the Korean president to safety, but are ambushed by enemy aircraft. George manages to skillfully fly low and force his pursuer into a hillside. Pete wants to take a more active role, rigging up a bazooka under his wings, but when he attacks a group of tanks, despite having some success, he is shot down.

George reports the loss and attempts to convince Major Jim Hacker to mount a rescue mission, but is turned down, as the base is now cut off and under constant attack. However, Pete makes it back to the base, with the help of a group of South Korean Army soldiers. Both pilots continue to fly desperately needed supplies, but George is badly wounded in an attack on the base. Pete flies him out to a Mobile Army Surgical Hospital unit where he meets Kate again; she has to tell Pete that George succumbed to his wounds.

Pete comes back to the front, more determined than ever to take the fight to the enemy. When Private Swenson and Sergeant Maxie Steiner install a powerful radio in his L5, it allows Pete to signal fighter jets overhead that North Korean tanks are about to attack. The fighters destroy the enemy tanks, but the L-5 is shot up. A wounded Pete and Maxie make it back to the base, but crash on landing, barely making it out alive.

== Cast ==
As credited, with screen roles identified:

- John Hodiak as Captain George P. Slocum
- John Derek as Lieutenant Pete Barker
- Audrey Totter as Lieutenant Kate
- Maureen O'Sullivan as Nancy Slocum
- Harvey Lembeck as Sergeant Maxie Steiner
- Richard Erdman as Private Swenson
- William Chun as Kilamson "Clancy" Lee
- Rex Reason as Major Jim Hacker
- Todd Karns as Lieutenant Jerry Barker
- Richard Bowers as Singing Soldier

Notable actors in uncredited roles include Dabbs Greer as a pilot, Chris Alcaide as an air force officer and John Crawford as Tech Sergeant.

== Production ==
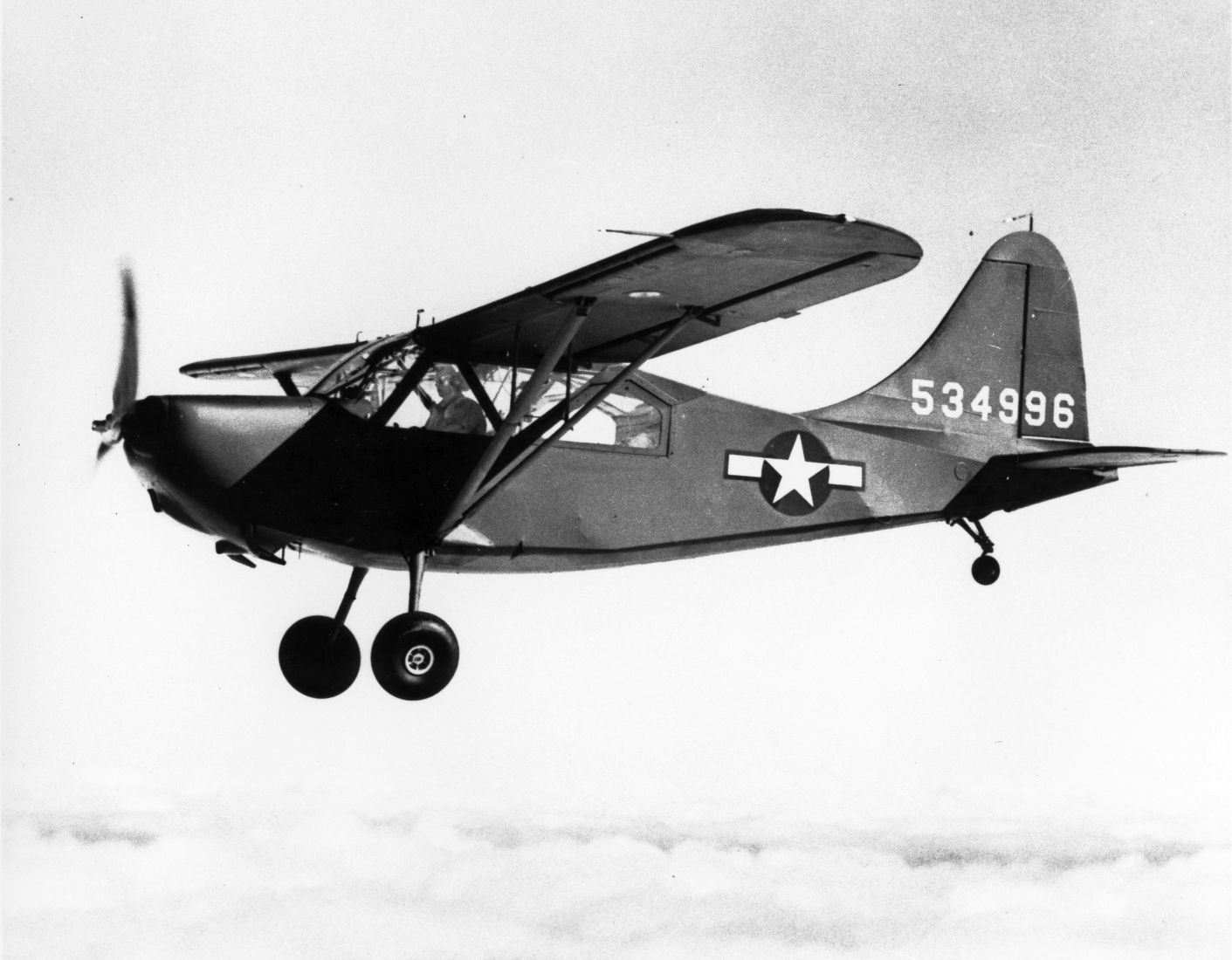
The Stinson L-5 Sentinel was prominently featured in Mission Over Korea.

Mission Over Korea was a typical Fred F. Sears actioner, combining an array of stock footage with live action. As one of the many features that Sears helmed in a very short period, the film was a "B" feature, although it did star John Hodiak, Maureen O'Sullivan and future star John Derek. With principal photography done over a two-week span, from February 4–18, 1953 in California, the script was adapted to incorporate a portion of the 85,000 feet of location footage photographed by producer Robert Cohn and a camera crew near the Korean front lines.

Most of the production work that remained involved merging the stock combat footage of United States Air Force and United States Army photography, which featured Stinson L-5 Sentinels, North American P-51 Mustang fighters standing in for Yaks and Lockheed F-80 Shooting Star aircraft.

Prior to the making of Mission Over Korea, the song, "Forgive Me," the English version of a popular Japanese song "Gomen-Nasai", was a minor hit record for Richard Bowers who appears as a soldier in the film and sings the song. (Note: Although Bowers hoped the use of the song in the film would lead to a major hit, not until Harry Belafonte reprised the song, did it begin to climb the charts.)

== Reception ==
Like most of Sears' work, with its poor production values and stagey plot, Mission Over Korea was not well received. The review in The New York Times, observed that the film being released at the time of the Korean armistice was "(a) belated, bedraggled salute to American Air Force valor during the early stages of the Korean conflict, this low-budget Columbia drama manages to stir up a stale, sophomoric batter of optimism, heroics and philosophical goo."

FilmInk called it "really good... has campy moments (eg Derek talking about wanting to napalm commies) but is full of interesting touches: it’s about spotter planes, which is different, there are genuinely exciting scenes and surprisingly interesting characterisation (Audrey Totter’s tired, traumatised nurse), plus an emotional ending."
