= Three for Jamie Dawn =

1956 film by Thomas Carr

Three for Jamie Dawn is a 1956 American film starring Laraine Day and Ricardo Montalbán.

== Cast ==
- Laraine Day as Sue Lorenz
- Ricardo Montalbán as George Lorenz (as Ricardo Montalban)
- Richard Carlson as Marv Random
- June Havoc as Lorrie Delacourt
- Maria Palmer as Julia Karek
- Eduard Franz as Anton Karek
- Regis Toomey as Murph
- Scotty Beckett as Gordon Peters
- Marilyn Simms as Jamie Dawn

== Production ==
Filming started 1 February 1956. Marilyn Simms was cast in the title role, but had no dialogue.

A 16mm copy is archived at the University of Southern California.
