= Amor y orgullo =

Mexican telenovela

- Genre: Telenovela; Drama
- Created by: Fernanda Villeli
- Directed by: Enrique Rambal
- Starring: María Elena Marqués; Ignacio López Tarso; Patricia Morán; Anita Blanch
- Country of origin: Mexico
- Original language: Spanish
- No. of episodes: 50

Production
- Executive producer: Ernesto Alonso
- Running time: 30 minutes

Original release
- Network: Telesistema Mexicano
- Release: 1966 – 1966

Related
- Tú eres un extraño; La búsqueda

Amor y orgullo (English title:Love and Pride) is a Mexican telenovela produced by Ernesto Alonso and transmitted by Telesistema Mexicano.

María Elena Marqués and Ignacio López Tarso starred as protagonists, Patricia Morán starred as main antagonist.

== Cast ==
- María Elena Marqués as Marcela
- Ignacio López Tarso as Jaime López
- Patricia Morán as Ruth
- Anita Blanch as Edelmira
- Miguel Manzano as Joaquin
- Aarón Hernán as Padre Juan
- Emma Roldán as Teo
- Hortensia Santoveña
- Rogelio Guerra as Armando
- Patricia de Morelos
- Regina Cardo
