= Battle Zone (film) =

1952 film by Lesley Selander

- Film poster
- Directed by: Lesley Selander
- Written by: Steve Fisher
- Produced by: Walter Wanger
- Starring: John Hodiak; Linda Christian
- Cinematography: Ernest Miller
- Edited by: Jack Ogilvie
- Music by: Marlin Skiles
- Color process: Black and white
- Production company: Walter Wanger Productions
- Distributed by: Allied Artists Pictures
- Release dates: October 22, 1952 (Los Angeles); October 31, 1952 (New York)
- Running time: 82 minutes
- Country: United States
- Language: English
- Budget: $200,000

Battle Zone is a 1952 American Korean War war film directed by Lesley Selander and starring John Hodiak, Stephen McNally and Linda Christian.

== Plot ==
During the Korean War, a rivalry develops between World War II veterans and combat photographers Danny Young and Mitch Turner Marine for the attention of Jeanne, a Red Cross nurse.

== Cast ==
- John Hodiak as Master Sgt. Danny Young
- Linda Christian as Jeanne
- Stephen McNally as Sgt. Mitch Turner
- Martin Milner as Cpl. Andy Sayee
- Dave Willock as Smitty
- Jack Larson as Cpl. James O'Doole
- Richard Emory as Lt. Mike Orlin
- Philip Ahn as South Korean Guerrilla Leader
- Carleton Young as Colonel
- Jeffrey Stone as Pilot (as John Fontaine)
- Todd Karns as Officer
- Gil Stratton as Runner
- Charles Bronson as Private
- Gregory Walcott as Rifleman

== Production ==
Battle Zone is the first of a series of low-budget action films produced by Walter Wanger for Allied Artists after his prison sentence for assault; Fort Vengeance and Kansas Pacific followed in 1953. Each of the films was shot in two weeks for $200,000, and they were produced without Wanger's supervision. The film was part of Allied Artists' attempt to increase the quality and prestige of its product.

The film was intended as a vehicle for Edmond O'Brien, but he was forced to withdraw for a starring role in The Difference, later retitled The Hitch-Hiker, and was replaced by John Hodiak in June 1952.

Some sequences were filmed at Camp Pendleton in California.

== Reception ==
In a contemporary review for The New York Times, critic Bosley Crowther "This sort of standardized warfare has been dished out so many times it scarcely seems necessary to mention that the story is hopelessly dull and the only good thing about the picture is the footage of actual fighting that has been intercut. Mr. Wanger and his crew have got together some pretty grim documentary shots of Marines in action in Korea and of characters going and coming behind the lines that further corroborates the record of hardship and discomfort in that zone. However, the juxtaposition of this footage to the staged and artificial scenes of the Messrs. Hodiak and McNally playing soldiers makes a contrast we'd rather not discuss. This, too, is one of those standard and unfortunate war film gaucheries that come out of mediocre writing, direction and production of such films."
