= Ricardo Montalbán =

Mexican and American actor (1920–2009)

Ricardo Montalbán KSG
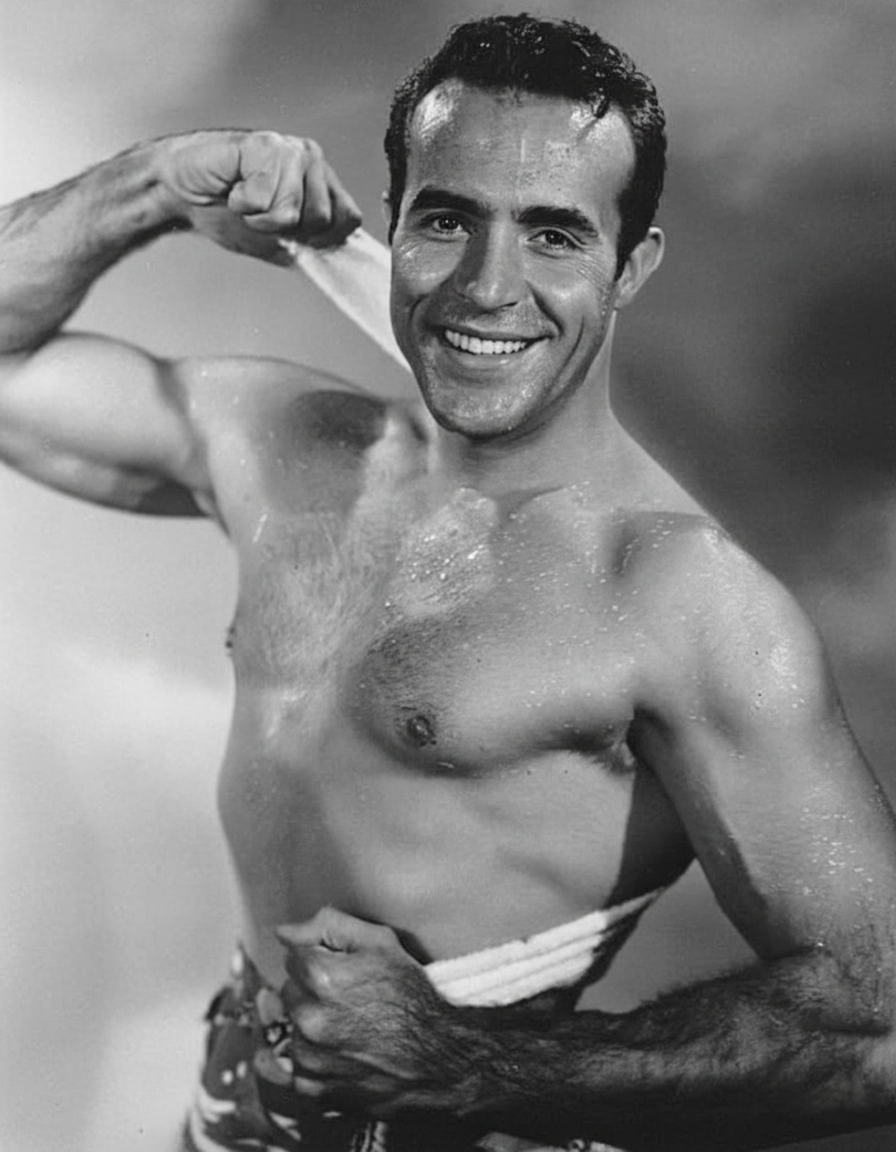
- Ricardo Montalbán in Right Cross (1950)
- Born: Ricardo Gonzalo Pedro Montalbán y Merino; November 25, 1920; Mexico City, Mexico
- Died: January 14, 2009 (aged 88); Los Angeles, California, U.S.
- Resting place: Holy Cross Cemetery, Culver City
- Occupation: Actor
- Years active: 1941–2008
- Spouse: Georgiana Young (m. 1944; died 2007)
- Children: 4
- Relatives: Carlos Montalbán (brother)
- Awards: Emmy Award (1978); Screen Actors Guild (1993); Hollywood Walk of Fame

Ricardo Gonzalo Pedro Montalbán y Merino (/ˌmɒntəlˈbɑːn/; Spanish: [montalˈβan]; November 25, 1920 – January 14, 2009) was a Mexican and American film and television actor. Montalbán's career spanned seven decades, during which he became widely known for performances in genres from crime and drama to musicals and comedy.

Later in his career, Montalbán portrayed Armando in the Planet of the Apes film series from the early 1970s, starring in both Escape from the Planet of the Apes (1971) and Conquest of the Planet of the Apes (1972). As the villain Khan Noonien Singh, a genetically enhanced human, he guest-starred in the original Star Trek television series (1967) and starred in the film Star Trek II: The Wrath of Khan (1982).

During the 1970s and 1980s, Montalbán was a spokesman for Chrysler for thirteen years, featured in their automotive commercials and advertisements, notably those in which he extolled the "rich Corinthian leather" used in the Cordoba's interior.

Montalbán played Mr. Roarke on the television series Fantasy Island (1977–1984). He won an Emmy Award for his role in the miniseries How the West Was Won (1978), and a Lifetime Achievement Award from the Screen Actors Guild in 1993. Montalbán was professionally active into his eighties, providing voices for animated films and commercials, and appearing as Grandfather Valentin in the Spy Kids franchise.

== Early life ==
Montalbán was born on November 25, 1920, in Mexico City, and grew up in Torreón, the son of Spanish immigrants Ricarda Merino Jiménez and Genaro Balbino Montalbán Busano, a store manager, who raised him as a Catholic. He was born with an arteriovenous malformation (AVM) in his spine. Montalbán had a sister, Carmen, and two brothers, Pedro and Carlos. As a teenager, he moved to Los Angeles to live with Carlos. They moved to New York City in 1940, and Montalbán earned a minor role in the play Her Cardboard Lover.

== Career ==
=== Short films ===
In 1941, Montalbán appeared in three-minute musicals produced for the Soundies film jukeboxes. He appeared in many of the New York–produced Soundies as an extra or as a member of a singing chorus (usually billed as Men and Maids of Melody), although he had the lead role in He's a Latin from Staten Island (1941), in which he (billed simply as "Ricardo") played the title role of a guitar-strumming gigolo, accompanied by an offscreen vocal by Gus Van.

=== Mexican films ===
Later in 1941, Montalbán returned to Mexico after learning that his mother was dying. There, he acted in a dozen Spanish-language films and became a star in his homeland.

He had an uncredited appearance in a version of The Three Musketeers (1942) starring Cantinflas. He can be glimpsed in El verdugo de Sevilla (1942), The Saint That Forged a Country (1942) starring Ramon Navarro, and La razón de la culpa (1943).

=== Stardom in Mexico ===
Montalbán became a star in Mexico in Santa (1943), which was directed by a Hollywood immigrant, Norman Foster. He followed it with a support role in Cinco fueron escogidos (1943).

Foster gave him a second lead role in The Escape (1944) aka La Fuga. Montalban had the star role in Cadetes de la naval, Nosotros, and The Hour of Truth (all 1945), the latter a bullfighting drama also directed by Foster.

Montalban was in The House of the Fox (1945), Pepita Jimenez (1946), and Fantasía ranchera (1947).

=== Metro-Goldwyn-Mayer ===
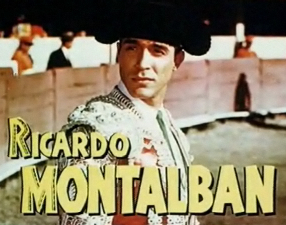
As Mario Morales in Fiesta

Montalbán's films had been seen by Metro-Goldwyn-Mayer who were looking for someone to play a bullfighter opposite Esther Williams in Fiesta (1947), shot in Mexico. Montalbán was cast and the movie was very popular; Metro-Goldwyn-Mayer signed him to a long-term contract.

The studio re-teamed him with Williams in On an Island with You (1948). He had a dance number in the Frank Sinatra musical The Kissing Bandit (1948), then did a third film with Williams, Neptune's Daughter (1949), in which they dueted on "Baby It's Cold Outside".

Montalbán's first leading role was in the film noir Border Incident (1949) with actor George Murphy, directed by Anthony Mann. It was one of a number of lower budgeted films made at the studio under Dore Schary and earned a small loss. Montalbán was the first Hispanic actor to appear on the front cover of Life magazine on November 21, 1949. "I was king for a week," he said later. "I thought the offers would flood in, but after a week—nothing."

Montalban was one of several soldiers in the William Wellman war film Battleground (1949), a huge success at the box office. He was given another star role in Mystery Street (1950), playing a detective in a film noir directed by John Sturges. It was a box office disappointment.

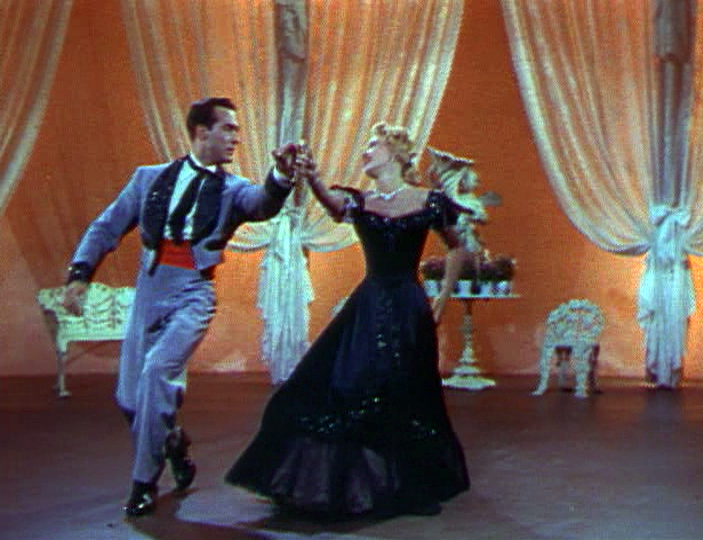
Montalbán dancing with Jane Powell in Two Weeks With Love (1950)

Sturges also directed Right Cross (1950) with Montalbán, Dick Powell and June Allyson. Montalbán and Jane Powell made the musical Two Weeks with Love (1950), which was a minor hit.

Universal borrowed Montalbán and Cyd Charisse for a swashbuckler, The Mark of the Renegade (1951). Back at Metro-Goldwyn-Mayer, he was second billed to Clark Gable in Across the Wide Missouri (1951), directed by Wellman. The film was a big hit, although Montalbán was injured during shooting.

The studio teamed him and Shelley Winters in My Man and I (1952) where he played a laborer under the direction of Wellman; it didn't sell well at the box office.

Montalbán was one of several names in Sombrero (1953), shot in Mexico. Montalbán was Lana Turner's leading man in Latin Lovers (1953). Both films lost money and Metro-Goldwyn-Mayer let him go.

He later said, "I played caricatures of what a Latin is supposed to be like. In reality, we are family men. I should have had the courage of Dolores Del Rio who returned to Mexico and made her best movies there."

=== B movies, television, and Broadway ===
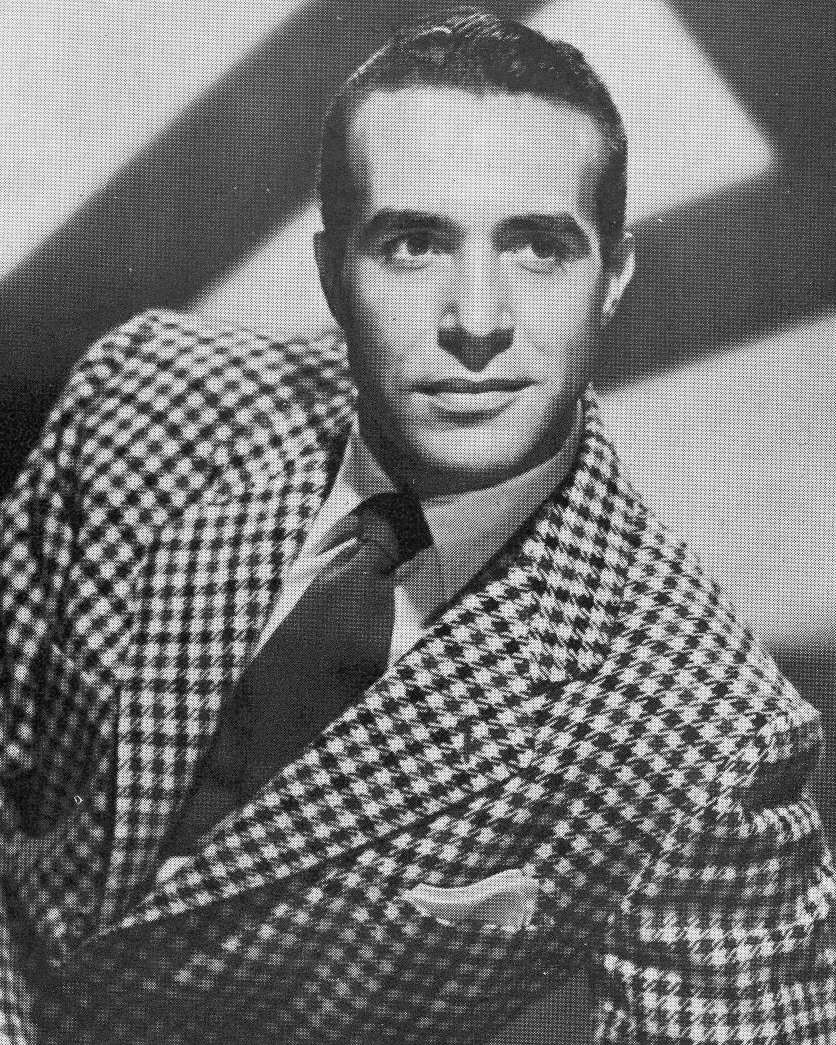
Montalbán in 1954

Montalbán did a swashbuckler for Sam Katzman, The Saracen Blade (1954), then returned to Mexico to star in Untouched (1954).

He travelled to Italy to make The Queen of Babylon (1954) with Rhonda Fleming, then returned to Mexico to make the US-financed A Life in the Balance (1955) with Anne Bancroft. He bought a story for himself, Green Shadows, but it appears not to have been made.

Montalbán began working in television, guest-starring on shows such as General Electric Theater, The Ford Television Theatre, Celebrity Playhouse, Climax!, The 20th Century-Fox Hour (versions of Broken Arrow and Five Fingers), Chevron Hall of Stars, Wagon Train, and Schlitz Playhouse.

In 1955, he appeared on Broadway with Gloria DeHaven in a musical adaptation of Seventh Heaven, but it ran for only forty-four performances. In Hollywood, he appeared in the thriller for Allied Artists, Three for Jamie Dawn (1956).

Montalbán returned to Italy for Desert Warrior (1957), then had his first role in an "A" Hollywood film for a number of years in Sayonara (1957), in which he played a Japanese dancer. He later said, "I was and still am very pleased with my performance and very much saddened by this picture. I was hoping for an Academy Award nomination, but unfortunately, most of my scenes ended up on the cutting-room floor."

From 1957 to 1959, Montalbán starred in the Broadway musical Jamaica, singing several light-hearted calypso numbers opposite Lena Horne, which ran for 558 performances. His performance earned him a Tony Award nomination.

Montalbán continued to guest-star on shows such as Colgate Theatre and Playhouse 90. When Jamaica ended, he guest-starred in Riverboat, Adventures in Paradise, Startime, Death Valley Days, Bonanza, Alfred Hitchcock Presents, The Christophers, The Dinah Shore Chevy Show, The Loretta Young Show (several times), Zorro, The Untouchables, Checkmate, Cain's Hundred, and The Lloyd Bridges Show.

Montalbán could also be seen in Let No Man Write My Epitaph (1960); the TV remake of Rashomon (1960) directed by Sidney Lumet; Rage of the Buccaneers (1961), an Italian swashbuckler in which Montalbán had a lead role alongside Vincent Price; Hemingway's Adventures of a Young Man (1962); The Reluctant Saint (1963) with Maximillian Schell; and Love is a Ball (1963) with Glenn Ford, playing a French duke. He was the Native American leader Little Wolf in Cheyenne Autumn (1964) directed by John Ford, did the TV version of The Fantasticks (1964), and returned to Mexico to make ¡Buenas noches, año nuevo! (1964).

He was mostly seen, though, on television in Alcoa Premiere, The Dick Powell Theatre, Ben Casey, The Greatest Show on Earth, The Lieutenant, The Great Adventure, Slattery's People, The Defenders, The Rogues, Burke's Law, Dr. Kildare, and The Man from U.N.C.L.E.

Montalbán had supporting roles in The Money Trap (1965) with Ford, directed by Burt Kennedy, Madame X (1966) with Turner for producer Ross Hunter, and The Singing Nun (1966) with Debbie Reynolds at MGM.

He guest-starred in The Long, Hot Summer, Daniel Boone, The Wild Wild West, Insight, Combat!, Mission: Impossible, I Spy, Hawaii Five-O (playing a Japanese-American crime boss), and Bob Hope Presents the Chrysler Theatre.

In 1965, he toured in The King and I. "'I think every actor loves the stage,' he said in 1991. 'The pros are that it is the actor's medium; there's no way your scene is going to end up on the cutting-room floor, and it's up to you to get and keep the attention of the audience by the truth of your performance.'"

He appeared in the television films Alice Through the Looking Glass (1966) (for which his fee was $10,000, equivalent to $99,000 today.) and Code Name: Heraclitus (1967), and the features The Longest Hundred Miles (1967), Sol Madrid (1968), and Blue (1968). He also guest-starred on "Space Seed", an episode of Star Trek. "I'm like a doctor on 24-hour call," he said in a 1967 interview. "I don't turn anything down."

Montalbán also starred in radio, such as on the internationally syndicated program Lobo del Mar (Seawolf), in which he was cast as the captain of a vessel that became part of some adventure at each port it visited. This 30-minute weekly show aired in many Spanish-speaking countries until the early 1970s.

=== Television movies ===
Montalbán guest-starred in The Felony Squad, Ironside, It Takes a Thief, and The High Chaparral. He did the television films The Pigeon (1969), The Desperate Mission (1969) (playing Joaquin Murrieta), and Black Water Gold (1970), and had a supporting role in the big screen film version of Sweet Charity (1969).

Montalbán was in The Name of the Game; Gunsmoke; Dan August; Bracken's World; Marcus Welby, M.D.; The Virginian; The Doris Day Show; Sarge; and Nichols. He did the television films The Aquarians (1970), The Face of Fear (1971), and Fireball Forward (1972) and the features The Deserter (1970), Escape from the Planet of the Apes (1971), Conquest of the Planet of the Apes, and The Train Robbers (1973) (directed by Kennedy).

Montalbán continued to guest-star on shows like O'Hara, U.S. Treasury; Here's Lucy; and Griff.

In 1972, Montalbán co-founded the Screen Actors Guild Ethnic Minority Committee with actors Carmen Zapata, Henry Darrow and Edith Diaz. In 1973, he returned to Broadway for a revival of Don Juan in Hell. He did the television films Wonder Woman (1974), The Mark of Zorro (1974), McNaughton's Daughter (1976), and guest-starred on Switch and Columbo.

In 1975, he was chosen as the television spokesman for the new Chrysler Cordoba. The car became a successful model, and over the following several years, was heavily advertised; his mellifluous delivery of a line praising the "soft", "fine" or "rich Corinthian leather" upholstery of the car's interior became famous and was much parodied, and Montalbán subsequently became a favorite subject of impersonators. For example, Eugene Levy frequently impersonated him on SCTV, as did Dan Aykroyd on Saturday Night Live. In 1986, he was featured in a magazine advertisement for the new Chrysler New Yorker.

Montalbán is in Won Ton Ton: The Dog Who Saved Hollywood (1976), and Joe Panther (1976) and had a regular role in a short lived series Executive Suite (1976). He guest-starred on Police Story and did the television films Mission to Glory: A True Story (1977), Captains Courageous (1977), as well as the miniseries How the West Was Won (1978).

=== Fantasy Island and Star Trek II ===
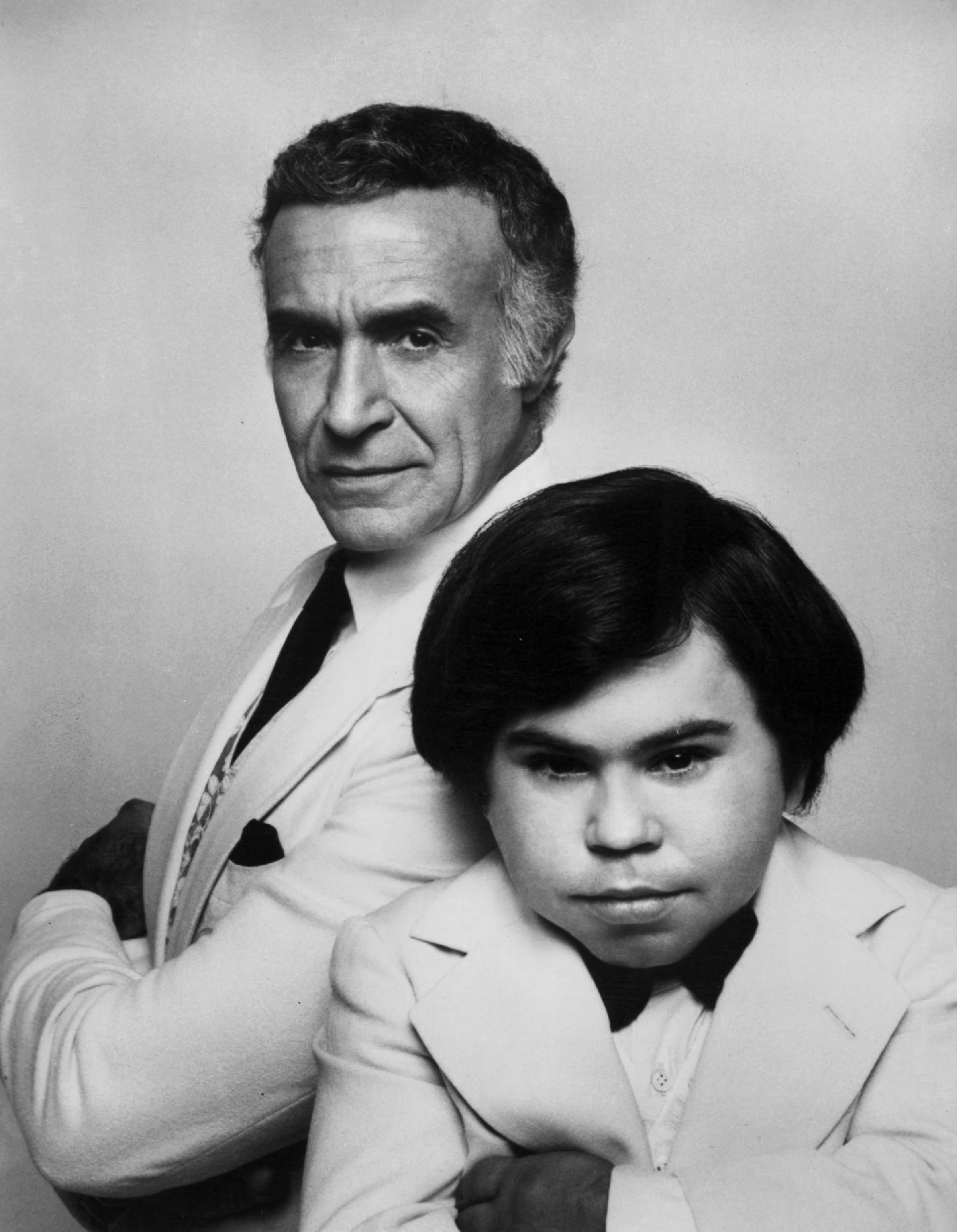
Ricardo Montalbán as Mr. Roarke and Hervé Villechaize as Tattoo in a publicity still for the television film Return to Fantasy Island

Montalbán's best-known television role was that of Mr. Roarke on the television series Fantasy Island, which he played from 1977 until 1984. For a while, the series was one of the most popular on television, and his character as well as that of his sidekick, Tattoo (played by Hervé Villechaize), became popular icons.

Another of his well-known roles was that of Khan Noonien Singh in Star Trek II: The Wrath of Khan (1982), in which he reprised a role that he had originated in the episode of Star Trek titled "Space Seed" (1967). Early rumors suggested Montalbán wore prosthetic muscles on his chest during filming of Star Trek II to appear more muscular. Director Nicholas Meyer replied that even in his sixties, Montalbán, who had a vigorous training regimen, was "one strong cookie", and that his real chest was seen on film. Khan's costume was specifically designed to display Montalbán's physique.

His performance as Khan was widely praised. Critic Christopher Null called Khan the "greatest role of Montalbán's career". New Yorker critic Pauline Kael said Montalbán's performance as Khan "was the only validation he has ever had of his power to command the big screen". Roger Ebert of The Chicago Sun-Times wrote how this type of film was "only as good as its villain" and Montalbán's decision to avoid overacting and instead play the character as motivated by "deeply wounded pride" inspired a measure of sympathy in the audience.

Montalbán agreed to take the role for a significant pay cut, since by his own admission, he relished reprising the role, and his only regret was that he and William Shatner never interacted – the characters never meet face to face, except through video communication – for their scenes were filmed several months apart to accommodate Montalbán's schedule for Fantasy Island. When, much later, Montalbán guest-starred in the Family Guy episode "McStroke" as a genetically engineered cow, his character made several references to his role as Khan, and similar references were made in his role as Armando Guitierrez on the animated series Freakazoid!. After a cameo in Cannonball Run II (1984), Montalbán had a guest role in Dynasty which led to a regular role in its spin-off The Colbys.

Montalbán played the villain in The Naked Gun: From the Files of Police Squad! (1988) and guest-starred in B.L. Stryker; Murder, She Wrote; Hearts Are Wild; and The Golden Palace.

=== Injury and later career ===
During the filming of Across the Wide Missouri (1951), Montalbán was thrown from his horse, knocked unconscious, and trampled by another horse, which aggravated his arteriovenous malformation and resulted in a traumatic back injury that never healed. The pain increased as he aged, and in 1993, he underwent over nine hours of spinal surgery that left his body below the waist impaired and requiring the use of mobility aids.

Despite constant pain, he continued to perform, providing voices for animated films and supporting his Nosotros Foundation. Filmmaker Robert Rodriguez created the role of Valentin Avellan in the Spy Kids film series specifically for Montalbán.

He had another regular series with Heaven Help Us (1994), but it only lasted 14 episodes.

In 1997, Montalbán sued the producers of Fantasy Island claiming he was entitled to five percent of the profits. The producers claimed the show had lost $11 million. The matter settled out of court.

Montalbán also narrated several historical documentaries including the Spanish version of the National Park Service's history of Pecos Pueblo for Pecos National Historical Park.

At one point during the development of the Disney animated film Lilo & Stitch (2002), Montalbán recorded voice lines for an alien member of a gang led by Stitch, then made to be an adult, naturally-born alien gang leader, using his performance as Khan in Star Trek II as basis. After a story meeting in which the film's gang elements were entirely cut due to being perceived as superfluous to the plot, Montalbán's character was removed.

Montalbán had a supporting role in Spy Kids 2: The Island of Lost Dreams (2002) and Spy Kids 3-D: Game Over (2003).

Prior to his death in January 2009, Montalbán recorded the voice for a guest character in an episode of the animated series American Dad!, in which main character Roger becomes the dictator of a South American country. According to executive producer Mike Barker, it was his last role after The Ant Bully.

== Nosotros Foundation and Montalbán Theatre ==
The way he was asked to portray Mexicans disturbed him, so Montalbán, along with Richard Hernandez, Val de Vargas, Rodolfo Hoyos Jr., Carlos Rivas, Tony de Marco, and Henry Darrow, established the Nosotros ("We") Foundation in 1970 to advocate for Latinos in the movie and television industries. He served as its first president, and was quoted as saying: "I received tremendous support, but there also were some negative repercussions. I was accused of being a militant, and as a result I lost jobs." Ironically, the Nosotros Foundation and he were instrumental in taking roles away from Nico Minardos, a Greek-American actor who in the 1970s often played Latino roles because of his appearance and accent. Minardos similarly became outspoken, and according to his agent and others, it cost him a recurring role as a Mexican mayor in an episode of Alias Smith and Jones.

The foundation created the Golden Eagle Awards, an annual awards show highlighting Latino actors. The awards are presented in conjunction with the Nosotros American Latino Film Festival, held at the Ricardo Montalbán Theatre in Hollywood.

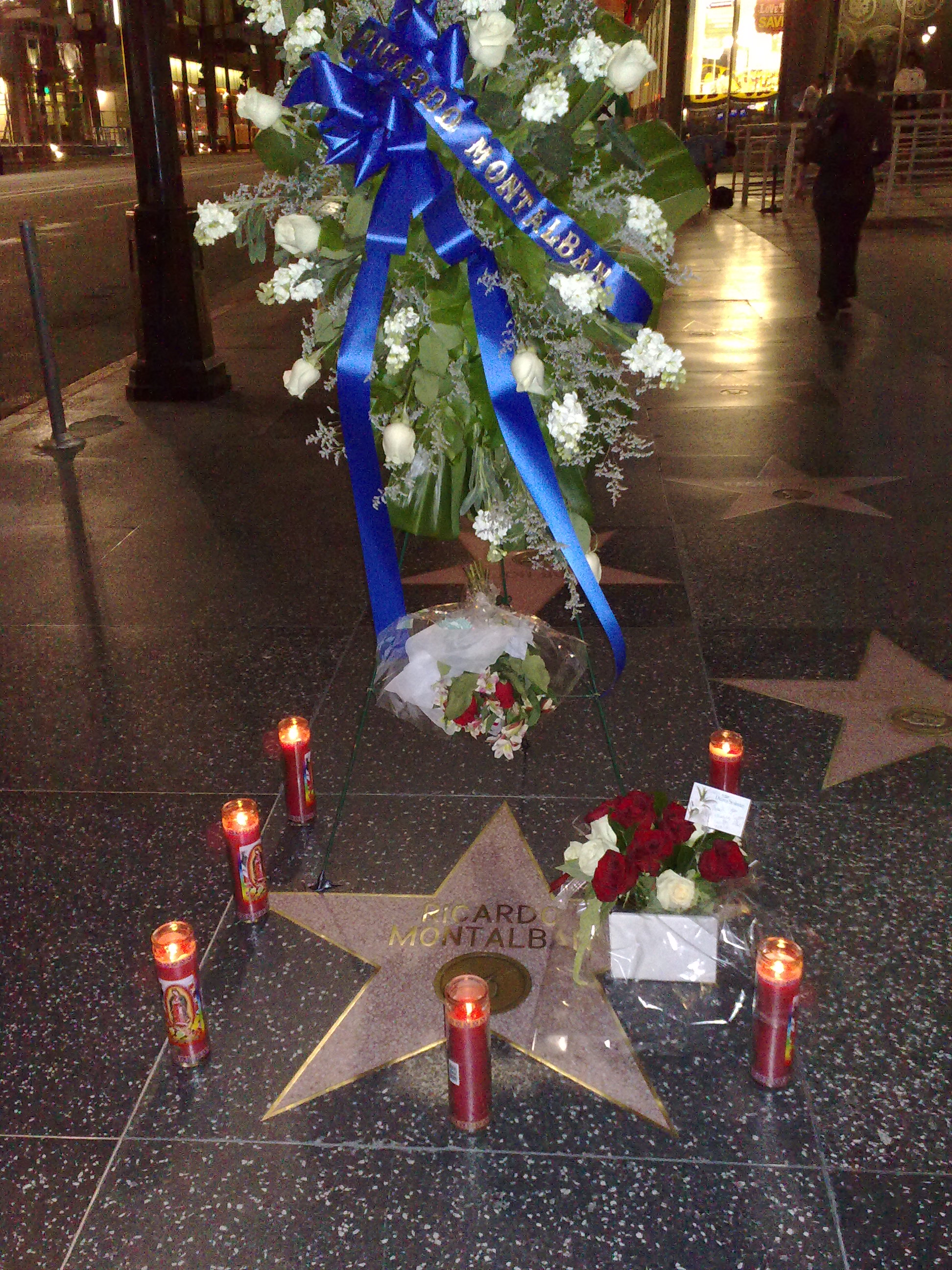
Ricardo Montalbán Hollywood Walk of Fame Star shortly after his death

The Nosotros Foundation and the Ricardo Montalbán Foundation agreed to purchase the Doolittle Theatre in 1999 from UCLA. The theater had been owned by Howard Hughes in the early 1930s, then later was renamed the Huntington Hartford Theater when purchased in 1954 by philanthropist Huntington Hartford, then later the Doolittle Theater. The process from agreement to opening took over four years. The facility in Hollywood was officially renamed the Ricardo Montalbán Theatre in a May 11, 2004, ceremony. The event was attended by numerous celebrities, including Ed Begley Jr. representing the Screen Actors Guild, Valerie Harper, Loni Anderson, Hector Elizondo, and Robert Goulet.

When Montalbán rolled onto the stage in his wheelchair, he repeated "the five stages of the actor" (originally coined by either Mary Astor or Jack Elam to describe the course of his own career). Montalbán had become famous for using the self-deprecating joke in interviews and in public speeches:

- Who is Ricardo Montalbán?
- Get me Ricardo Montalbán.
- Get me a Ricardo Montalbán type.
- Get me a young Ricardo Montalbán.
- Who is Ricardo Montalbán?

He then jokingly added two more stages:

- "Wait a minute—isn't that What's-his-name?", referring to his role in the Spy Kids movies
- "Who the hell is that?", believing that to be the reaction of people seeing his name on the theater marquee.

Montalbán spoke about the goal of the Nosotros organization:

Mexico is my mother; the United States the best friend I will ever have. And so I dream of the day when my mother will say, 'Ricardo, you have chosen a wonderful friend.' And the day when the friend will say, 'Ricardo, you have a sensational mother.' That is why it is very important to bring us together. Brothers and sisters, love thy neighbor as thyself. And this theatre, I think, can be a little grain of sand towards that end. Here we have opened the doors not only for the opportunity of young talent to develop—writers, directors, actors—but also in coming together as a group in this society in which we live. Let's open a hand of friendship and love and brotherhood. That is my dream. I'll never see it complete while I'm still alive, but I think this is the beginning, and that is what makes me so happy to see this come to fruition.

== Personal life ==
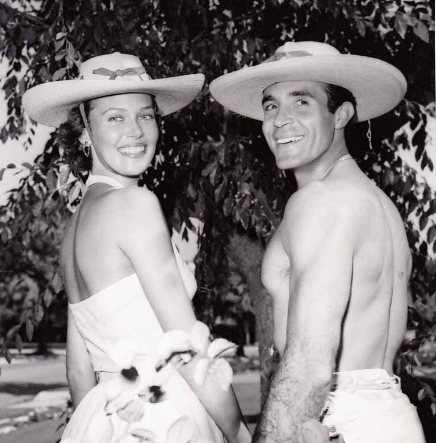
Montalbán with wife Georgiana Young (c. 1950)

After seeing Georgiana Young in The Story of Alexander Graham Bell (1939), then-18-year-old Montalbán became enamored of the 15-year-old Young – half-sister of actresses Sally Blane, Polly Ann Young, and Loretta Young. Montalbán had started his own stage and film career by the time the two met on a blind date; Montalbán proposed that evening, later stating "It took a week to persuade her." They married in 1944, and had four children together: Laura, Mark, Anita and Victor. After 63 years of marriage, Young died in 2007, at age 83.

Montalbán was a practicing Catholic, once proclaiming that his religion was the most important thing in his life. He was a member of the Good Shepherd Parish and the Catholic Motion Picture Guild in Beverly Hills, California. In 1998, Pope John Paul II made him a Knight of the Order of St. Gregory the Great (KSG), the highest honor a Catholic lay person can receive from the church. In 1986, in honor of the 100th anniversary of the Statue of Liberty, he recorded a public service announcement celebrating the United States' generosity and hospitality to him as a foreign-born actor.

His autobiography Reflections: A Life in Two Worlds was published in January 1980 by Doubleday.

For many years, Montalbán followed a strict diet and physical training regimen, giving him an enviable physique. After the release of The Wrath of Khan, director Nicholas Meyer was quick to quell rumors of Montalbán using prosthetics during filming.

In 2005, Montalbán was due to receive an honorary doctorate from the University of New Mexico, but due to circumstances was unable to attend the ceremony. On May 13, 2023, Montalbán was posthumously awarded an honorary Doctorate of Humane Letters from UNM, which was accepted by his granddaughter Lydia Martinez.

=== Death ===
On January 14, 2009, Montalbán died at his home in Los Angeles at the age of 88. According to his son-in-law, Gilbert Smith, he died of "complications from advancing age". The precise cause of death was revealed to be congestive heart failure. He is buried in the Holy Cross Cemetery in Culver City, California.

== In popular culture ==
Andy García portrays Ricardo Montalbán in the 2018 film My Dinner with Hervé, which is based on the life of Montalbán's Fantasy Island co-star Hervé Villechaize.

In September 2026, he was recognized as Turner Classic Movies Star of the Month.

== Filmography ==
=== Film ===
Year	Title	Role	Notes
1941	Soundies	Chorus Member / Crowd Extra	Musical Shorts
1942	El verdugo de Sevilla	Jacobito	as Ricardo Montalvan
1942	The Saint Who Forged a Country	Soldado	Uncredited
1943	La razón de la culpa	Anunciador en barco	Uncredited
1943	Santa	Jarameño	
1943	Five Were Chosen	Stefan	
1944	The Escape	Teniente	
1945	Cadetes de la Naval	Cadet Ricardo Almagro	
1945	Nosotros	Armando Suárez	
1945	La hora de la verdad	Rafael Meija	
1945	La casa de la zorra	Alberto Salcedo	
1946	Pepita Jiménez	Luis Vargas	
1947	Fiesta	Mario Morales	
1948	On an Island with You	Ricardo Montez	
1948	The Kissing Bandit	Fiesta Specialty Dancer	
1949	Neptune's Daughter	José O'Rourke	
1949	Border Incident	Pablo Rodriguez	
1949	Battleground	Rodriguez	
1950	Mystery Street	Lieutenant Peter Morales	
1950	Right Cross	Johnny Monterez	
1950	Two Weeks With Love	Demi Armendez	
1951	The Mark of the Renegade	Marcos Zappa	
1951	Across the Wide Missouri	Ironshirt	
1952	My Man and I	Chu Chu Ramirez	
1953	Sombrero	Pepe Gonzales	
1953	Latin Lovers	Roberto Santos	
1954	The Saracen Blade	Pietro Donati	
1954	Untouched	Federico Gascón	
1954	Queen of Babylon	Amal	
1955	A Life in the Balance	Antonio Gómez	
1956	Three for Jamie Dawn	George Lorenz	
1957	Desert Warrior	Prince Said	
1957	Sayonara	Nakamura	
1960	Let No Man Write My Epitaph	Louie Ramponi	
1961	Rage of the Buccaneers	Captain Gordon	
1962	Hemingway's Adventures of a Young Man	Major Padula	
1962	The Reluctant Saint	Father Raspi	
1963	Love Is a Ball	Duke Gaspard Ducluzeau	
1964	Cheyenne Autumn	Little Wolf	
1964	The Fantasticks	El Gallo	Television film
1964	¡Buenas noches, año nuevo!	Fernando	
1965	The Money Trap	Pete Delanos	
1966	Madame X	Phil Benton	
1966	The Singing Nun	Father Clementi	
1967	The Longest Hundred Miles	Father Sanchez	
1968	Sol Madrid	Jalisco	
1968	Blue	Ortega	
1969	Sweet Charity	Vittorio Vitale	
1969	The Desperate Mission	Joaquin Murrieta	Television film
1970	The Deserter	Natachai	
1971	The Face of Fear	Sergeant Frank Ortega	Television film
1971	Escape from the Planet of the Apes	Armando	
1972	Conquest of the Planet of the Apes	Armando	
1973	The Train Robbers	The Pinkerton Man	
1974	The Mark of Zorro	Captain Esteban	Television film
1976	Won Ton Ton, the Dog Who Saved Hollywood	Silent Film Star	
1976	Joe Panther	Turtle George	
1977	Mission to Glory: A True Story	General Lafuente	
1977	Captains Courageous	Manuel	Television film
1982	Star Trek II: The Wrath of Khan	Khan Noonien Singh	
1984	Cannonball Run II	King	
1988	The Naked Gun: From the Files of Police Squad!	Vincent Ludwig	
2002	Spy Kids 2: The Island of Lost Dreams	Grandpa Valentin Avellan	
2003	Spy Kids 3-D: Game Over	Grandpa Valentin Avellan	
2006	The Ant Bully	Head of Council (voice)	Final film role

=== Television ===
Year	Title	Role	Notes
1955	The Ford Television Theatre	Carlos Cortez	Episode: "Cardboard Casanova"
1955	Climax!	Pete McLean	Episode: "The Mojave Kid"
1956	General Electric Theater	Esteban Espinosa	Episode: "Esteban's Legacy"
1956	Celebrity Playhouse		Episode: "The Foreigner"
1956	Chevron Hall of Stars		2 episodes
1956	Climax!	Joe Bermudes	Episode: "Island in the City"
1956	The Ford Television Theatre	Carlos Dominguez	Episode: "Lady in His Life"
1956	The 20th Century-Fox Hour	Cicero & Cochise	2 episodes
1957	Wagon Train	Jean LeBec	Episode: "The Jean LeBec Story"
1957	Schlitz Playhouse	Pietro	Episode: "Storm Over Rapallo"
1957	Playhouse 90	Teddy Green	Episode: "Child of Trouble"
1958	Colgate Theatre	Tio	Episode: "Tonight in Havana"
1959	Adventures in Paradise	Henri Privaux	Episode: "The Derelict"
1959	Riverboat	Lieutenant Andre B. Devereaux	Episode: "A Night at Trapper's Landing"
1959	Playhouse 90	Vicente Hidalgo	Episode: "Trouble for Three"
1960	Alfred Hitchcock Presents	"Tony" Lorca / Pepe Lorca	Episode: "Outlaw in Town"
1960	Death Valley Days	Joaquin Murietta	Episode: "Eagle in the Rocks"
1960	Bonanza	Matsou	Episode: "Day of Reckoning"
1960	Play of the Week	Bandit Tasmoro	Episode: "Rashomon"
1960	Startime	Turk	Episode: "Jeff McLeod, the Last Reb"
1960	Hamlet	Claudius	Television film
1961	The Dinah Shore Chevy Show	Karl Steiner	1 episode
1961	The Untouchables	Frank Makouris	Episode: "Stranglehold"
1962	Cain's Hundred	Vincent Pavanne	Episode: "A Creature Lurks in Ambush"
1962	The Lloyd Bridges Show	Navarro	Episode: "War Song"
1962	The Virginian	Enrique Cuellar	Episode: "The Big Deal"
1963	Ben Casey	Henry Davis	Episode: "Six Impossible Things Before Breakfast"
1964	The Lieutenant	Private First Class John Reading	Episode: "Tour of Duty"
1964	The Defenders	"Spanish John" Espejo	Episode: "Whitewash"
1964	The Man from U.N.C.L.E.	Satine	Episode: "The Dove Affair"
1966	The Wild Wild West	Colonel Noel Bartley Vautrain	Episode: "The Night of the Lord of Limbo"
1966	Dr. Kildare	Damon West	4 episodes
1966	The Man from U.N.C.L.E.	Delgado	Episode: "The King of Diamonds Affair"
1966	Daniel Boone	Count Alfonso De Borba	Episode: "The Symbol"
1966	I Spy	General Vera	Episode: "Magic Mirror"
1967	Star Trek	Khan Noonien Singh	Episode: "Space Seed"
1967	The Longest Hundred Miles	Father Sanchez	Television film
1967	Mission: Impossible	Gerard Sefra	Episode: "Snowball in Hell"
1967	Combat!	Barbu	Episode: "Gadjo"
1968	Ironside	Sergeant Al Cervantes	Episode: "The Sacrifice"
1968	The High Chaparral	El Tigre	Episode: "Tiger by the Tail"
1968	It Takes a Thief	Nick Grobbo	2 episodes
1968	The Virginian	Louis Boissevain	Episode: "The Wind of Outrage"
1968	Hawaii Five-O	Tokura	Episode: "Samurai"
1968	The High Chaparral	Padre Sanchez	Episode: "Our Lady of Guadalupe"
1970	Gunsmoke	Chato	Episode: "Chato"
1970	Marcus Welby, M.D.	Rick Rivera	Episode: "Labyrinth"
1971	The Doris Day Show	Richard Cordovan	Episode: "Billy's First Date"
1972	Here's Lucy	Prince Phillip Gregory Hennepin of Montalbania	Episode: "Lucy and Her Prince Charming"
1972	Hawaii Five-O	Alex Pareno	Episode: "Death Wish on Tantalus Mountain"
1973	Death Follows the Psycho	Human Time Bomb	
1974	Wonder Woman	Abner Smith	Pilot
1975	Switch	Jean-Paul	Episode: "Kiss of Death"
1976	Columbo	Luis Montoya	Episode: "A Matter of Honor"
1976–1977	Executive Suite	David Valerio	8 episodes
1977	Police Story	Major Sergio Flores	Episode: "Hard Rock Brown"
1978	How the West Was Won	Satangkai	4 episodes
1978–1984	Fantasy Island	Mr. Roarke	124 episodes
1985–1987	The Colbys	Zachary "Zach" Powers	48 episodes
1986	Dynasty	Zachary "Zach" Powers	2 episodes
1990	B.L. Stryker	Victor Costanza	Episode: "High Rise"
1990	Murder, She Wrote	Vaacclav Maryska	Episode: "Murder in F Sharp"
1991	Cadena braga	Marcel	Telenovela
1991	Dream On	Alejandro Goldman	Episode: "The Second Greatest Story Ever Told"
1993	The Golden Palace	Lawrence Gentry	Episode: "Senor Stinky Learns Absolutely Nothing About Life"
1994	Heaven Help Us	Mr. Shepherd	13 episodes
1995–1997	Freakazoid!	Armando Gutierrez (voice)	5 episodes
1997	Chicago Hope	Colonel Martin Nieves	Episode: "Colonel of Truth"
1998	Love Boat: The Next Wave	Manuel Kaire	Episode: "Getting to Know You"
2000	Buzz Lightyear of Star Command	Vartkes (voice)	Episode: "Lone Wolf"
2001	Titans	Mr. Sanchez	Episode: "Someone Wicked This Way Comes"
2002	Dora the Explorer	El Encantador (voice)	Episode: "The Missing Piece"
2002–2007	Kim Possible	Señor Senior Sr. (voice)	5 episodes
2003	The Brothers García	Raul Apodaca	Episode: "The Spin Zone"
2008	Family Guy	The Cow (voice)	Episode: "McStroke"
2009	American Dad!	General Juanito Pequeño (voice)	Episode: "Moon Over Isla Island"; Posthumous release
2019	Star Trek: Short Treks	Khan Noonien Singh	Archival audio Episode: "Ephraim and Dot" (posthumous appearance)
