= Across the Wide Missouri (book) =

History book by Bernard DeVoto

- First edition cover
- Author: Bernard DeVoto
- Publisher: Houghton Mifflin
- Publication date: 1947

Across the Wide Missouri, With an Account of the Discovery of the Miller Collection is a 1947 nonfiction history book by American historian Bernard DeVoto. It is the second volume of a trilogy that includes The Year of Decision (1942) and The Course of Empire (1952). It won the 1948 Pulitzer Prize for History.

== Description ==
Across the Wide Missouri is a history of the Rocky Mountain fur trade in the American West in the Upper Missouri River basin during its peak in the 1830s. It focuses on the Rocky Mountain Fur Company (RMFC), which competed with John Jacob Astor's American Fur Company and the Hudson's Bay Company by setting up an annual summer trade rendezvous supplied by overland wagon train in a different mountain valley every year instead of using fixed trading posts. The chronology is sometimes confusing, but the book contains a lively if somewhat romanticized portrayal of the way of life of the individual trappers known as Mountain Men, who were the RMFC's main suppliers and customers, with less attention given to the organized "brigades" of American Fur. There is a lot about the economics of the trade, including the inability of many free trappers to get out of debt to the fur companies who both bought their furs and sold them their supplies. There is also a certain amount of political intrigue over the Oregon boundary dispute, with the book depicting the several nations who had competing ambitions over present-day Oregon.

The book is well researched and documented, using original sources from the people involved, such as personal diaries, letters, journals, notes, and conversational accounts. Devoto’s opinions on the cultures of the various Native American tribes and their relations with the Mountain Men are based on these sources, and may not meet current standards of political correctness, but he does not corrupt history by cutting “his trail through an undergrowth of twentieth century ideas projected backward, usually with indignation.” (P298) He portrays the trappers' attitudes toward race and gender as they were, without judgment, including the practical necessity for the independent trapper to purchase a Native American wife from her family to help make camp and process pelts, a common transaction also practiced by the Native American tribes themselves.

DeVoto points out that the RMFC pioneered overland wagon transport across the Great Plains, and that the knowledge of the interior West gained by the Mountain Men played an essential role in the overland migrations to California and Oregon in the 1840s, with many of the former trappers working as scouts and guides after the fur trade collapsed due to over-hunting of beaver and changes in fashion.

== Reception ==
The book was awarded the Pulitzer Prize for History in 1948 and was adapted as an eponymous 1951 film starring Clark Gable.
