= Oh Shenandoah =

American folk song

"Shenandoah"
"Shenandoah" as performed by the Singing Sergeants of the United States Air Force Band

"Oh Shenandoah" (also called "Shenandoah", "Across the Wide Missouri", "Rolling River", "Oh, My Rolling River", "World of Misery") is an American folk song of unknown origin, dating to the early 19th century. The song is number 324 in the Roud Folk Song Index.

The song "Shenandoah" appears to have originated with American and Canadian voyageurs or fur traders traveling down the Missouri River in canoes and has developed several different sets of lyrics. Some lyrics refer to the Oneida chief Shenandoah and a canoe-going trader who wants to marry his daughter. By the mid-1800s versions of the song had become a sea shanty heard or sung by sailors in various parts of the world.

Other variations (due to the influence of its oral dispersion among different regions) include the Caribbean (St. Vincent) version, "World of Misery", referring not to an "Indian princess" but to "the white mullata".

== History ==
Until the 19th century, only adventurers who sought their fortunes as trappers and traders of beaver fur ventured into the lands of the indigenous peoples as far west as the Missouri River. Most of these French colonial "voyageurs" in the fur trade era were loners who became friendly with, and sometimes married, Native Americans. Some lyrics of this song heard by and before 1860 tell the story of a trader who fell in love with the daughter of the Oneida Iroquois chief Shenandoah (1710–1816) who lived in the central New York state town of Oneida Castle. He was a co-founder of the Oneida Academy which became Hamilton College in Clinton, New York, and is buried on the campus grounds.

["Shenandoah"] probably came from the American or Canadian voyageurs, who were great singers ... . In the early days of America, rivers and canals were the chief trade and passenger routes, and boatmen were an important class. Shenandoah was a celebrated Indian chief in American history, and several towns in the States are named after him. Besides being sung at sea, this song figured in old public school collections.

— W.B. Whall (1910)

The canoe-going fur-trading voyageurs were great singers, and songs were an important part of their culture. In the early 19th century flatboatmen who plied the Missouri River were known for their shanties, including "Oh Shenandoah". Sailors heading down the Mississippi River picked up the song and made it a capstan shanty that they sang while hauling in the anchor. This boatmen's song found its way down the Mississippi River to American clipper ships—and thus around the world.

The song had become popular as a sea shanty with seafaring sailors by the mid-1800s. A version of the song called "Shanadore" was printed in Capt. Robert Chamblet Adams' article "Sailors' Songs" in the April 1876 issue of The New Dominion Monthly. He also included it in his 1879 book On Board the "Rocket". "Shanadore" was later printed as part of William L. Alden's article "Sailor Songs" in the July 1882 issue of Harper's New Monthly Magazine, and in the 1892 book Songs that Never Die. Alfred Mason Williams' 1895 Studies in Folk-song and Popular Poetry called it a "good specimen of a bowline chant".

Percy Grainger recorded Charles Rosher of London England singing Shenandoah in 1906 and the recording is available online via the British Library Sound Archive. A recording sung by former shantyman Stanley Slade of Bristol, England, in 1943 is also publicly available.

In a 1930 letter to the UK newspaper The Times a former sailor who had worked aboard clipper ships that carried wool between Australia and Great Britain in the 1880s said that he believed the song had originated as an African American spiritual which developed into a work song. (Note: This chantey is obviously of American origin ... . 'Shenandoah' was more a wool and cotton chantey than a capstan chantey. I have many times heard it sung down the hold on the wool screws by the Sydney waterside workers ... and many were full-blood negroes, who undoubtedly brought these chanteys off the cotton ships ... . With regard to the words, these vary according to the taste of the chantey man in the first and third line of each verse, there being no effort called for on these two lines, but the second and fourth lines were always the same, these being the rhythm lines on which the weight was used. When I was in the wool trade in the eighties, in both The Tweed and Cutty Sark this chantey was daily used on the wool screws. — R.L. Andrews (1930))

One of the first popular singers to record it was Paul Robeson, who released several versions from the 1930s onwards.

== Lyrics ==
Since "Shenandoah" was a riverman's and then sailor's song and went through numerous changes and versions over the years and centuries, there are no set lyrics. Modern variations may include lyrics such as the following:

Oh Shenandoah,
I long to see you,
And hear your rolling rivers
Oh Shenandoah,
I long to hear you,
Away, you rolling river.
Oh Shenandoah,
I long to hear you,
Away, we're bound away
Cross the wide Missouri.

Oh Shenandoah,
I love your daughter,
Away, you rolling river.
For her I'd cross
Your roaming waters,
Way, we're bound away
Across the wide Missouri.

'Tis seven years
since last I've seen you,
Away, you rolling river.
'Tis seven years
since last I've seen you,
Away, we're bound away
Cross the wide Missouri.

Oh Shenandoah,
I long to hear you,
Away you rolling river.
Oh Shenandoah,
I long to hear you,
Away, we're bound away
Cross the wide Missouri.

Oh Shenandoah,
I long to hear you,
Far away, you rolling river.
Oh Shenandoah,
Just to be near you,
Far away, far away.
Across the wide Missouri.

=== Earlier versions ===
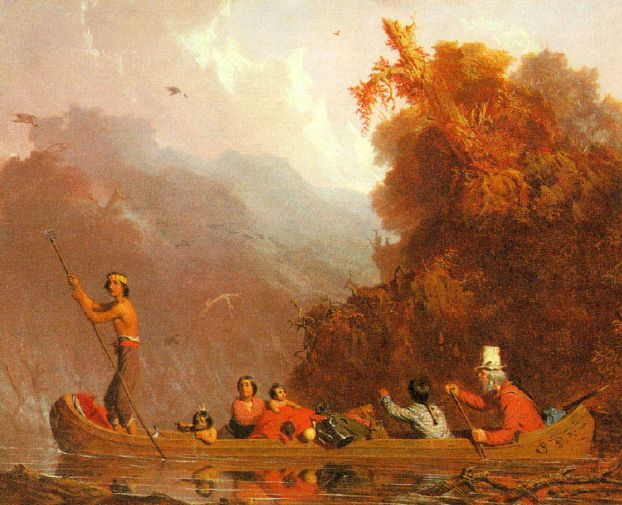
Charles Deas' The Trapper and his Family (1845) depicts a voyageur and his Native American wife and children

Lyrics from prior to 1860, given by Whall (1910) were reported as follows:

Missouri, she's a mighty river.
Away you rolling river.
The redskins' camp lies on its borders.
Ah-ha, I'm bound away, 'Cross the wide Missouri.

The white man loved the Indian maiden,
Away you rolling river
With notions (Note: Old "notions" = modern "knick-knacks".) his canoe was laden.
Ah-ha, I'm bound away, 'Cross the wide Missouri.

"O, Shenandoah, I love your daughter,
Away you rolling river.
I'll take her 'cross yon rolling water."
Ah-ha, I'm bound away, 'Cross the wide Missouri.

The chief disdained the trader's dollars:
Away you rolling river.
"My daughter never you shall follow."
Ah-ha, I'm bound away, 'Cross the wide Missouri.

At last there came a Yankee skipper.
Away you rolling river.
He winked his eye, and he tipped his flipper.
Ah-ha, I'm bound away, 'Cross the wide Missouri.

He sold the chief that fire-water,
Away you rolling river.
And 'cross the river he stole his daughter.
Ah-ha, I'm bound away, 'Cross the wide Missouri.

"O, Shenandoah, I long to hear you,
Away you rolling river.
Across that wide and rolling river."
Ah-ha, I'm bound away, 'Cross the wide Missouri.

J.E. Laidlaw of San Francisco reported hearing a version sung by a black Barbadian sailor aboard the Glasgow ship Harland in 1894:

Oh, Shenandoah! I hear you calling!
Away, you rolling river!
Yes, far away I hear you calling,
Ha, Ha! I'm bound away across the wide Missouri.

My girl, she's gone far from the river,
Away, you rolling river!
An' I ain't goin' to see her never.
Ha, Ha! I'm bound away, (&c.) (Note: Brookington added his informant Laidlaw had later heard it sung "almost word for word as the sailor of Harland sang it" in 1926 at Monterey Presidio by a captain of the 9th U.S. Cavalry, and that this regiment, though officered by whites, was made up largely of black troopers. Brookington speculated, therefore, the song was originally a negro spiritual.)

Lyrics to "Oh Shenandoah" as sung by Tennessee Ernie Ford (1959):

Oh Shenandoah, I hear you calling,
Hi-o, you rolling river.
Oh Shenandoah, I long to hear you,
Hi-o, I'm bound away.
'Cross the wide, Mis-sou-ri.

Mis-sou-ri, She's a mighty river,
Hi-o, you rolling river.
When she rolls down, her topsails shiver,
Hi-o, I'm bound away,
'Cross the wide, Mis-sou-ri.

Farewell my dearest, I'm bound to leave you,
Hi-o, you rolling river.
Oh Shenandoah, I'll not deceive you,
Hi-o, I'm bound away.
'Cross the wide Mis-sou-ri.

== Modern usage ==
The song is popular in local organizations such as Shenandoah University, Southern Virginia University, Washington and Lee University, Virginia Tech and the Virginia Military Institute.

"Shenandoah" was proposed as the "interim state song" for Virginia in 2006 with updated lyrics. The proposal was contentious because the standard folksong refers to the Missouri River and in most versions of the song the name "Shenandoah" refers to an Indian chief, not the Shenandoah Valley or Shenandoah River, both of which lie almost entirely in Virginia.

"Our Great Virginia" which uses the melody of "Shenandoah" was designated by the Virginia Legislature as the official traditional state song of Virginia in 2015.

In the movies it is featured in the soundtrack of the 1965 movie Shenandoah, starring Jimmy Stewart. It is also heard repeatedly in 1947's Mourning Becomes Electra, and as part of a medley in the 1962 film How the West Was Won. As a sea chanty, it is heard in Java Head (1934). Choral arrangements of the song have been used in the films The Good Shepherd and Nixon.

Members of the Western Writers of America chose it as one of the Top 100 Western songs of all time. In June 2026, CBS News included the song in its list of the 250 essential American songs of the past 250 years.

Various arrangements by Percy Grainger have been recorded by John Shirley-Quirk and other classically trained singers. "A song of the waters: variations on the folksong Shenandoah" is a classical composition by James Cohn. At least one version was arranged by Leslie Woodgate.

The song is performed by the Voices of Liberty as Epcot as one of the groups main songs, with an arrangement from Derric Johnson.

The song is featured in the Fallout series, being played on Appalachia Radio in the game Fallout 76.

== Selected notable recordings ==
- Paul Robeson on Shenandoah (Gramophone, 1936)
- Jo Stafford on American Folk Songs (Corinthian, 1950)
- Paul Clayton on Whaling and Sailing Songs from the Days of Moby Dick (Allmusic, 1956)
- Pete Seeger on American Favorite Ballads, Volume 1 (Smithsonian Folkways, 1958)
- Bob Dylan on Down in the Groove (1988)
- Keith Jarrett on The Melody at Night, with You (1998)
- Cowboy Nation on A Journey out of Time (2000)
- Jerry Garcia and David Grisman on Not For Kids Only (1993)
- Bill Frisell on Good Dog, Happy Man (1999)
- Bruce Springsteen and the Seeger Sessions Band on We Shall Overcome: The Seeger Sessions (Columbia, 2006)
- Tom Waits with Keith Richards on Son of Rogues Gallery: Pirate Ballads, Sea Songs & Chanteys (Anti-, 2013).
- Trampled By Turtles on Duluth (Banjodad Records, 2008).
- Harry Belafonte Deluxe: Greatest Hits - Harry Belafonte 2012

== See also ==
- Across the Wide Missouri (disambiguation)
