= Gomen-nasai (song) =

"Gomen-nasai" is a 1951 song with music by Raymond Hattori, a Japanese conductor and musical director for Nippon Columbia, and lyrics by Benedict Mayers, a Roosevelt University professor serving in the U.S. Army.

== First recording ==
It became a hit first in Japan then in America when Richard Bowers, a U.S. Army GI stationed in the Far East during 1952, took part in a Tokyo recording session for Colombia with the Columbia Tokyo Orchestra. Bowers sang the song again in character as a US G.I. in the 1953 film Mission Over Korea.

== Other recordings ==
- Eri Chiemi, who would later become part of the Sannin Musume (Three Girls) trio along with Misora Hibari and Yukimura Izumi, toured the United States in 1953 appearing in a charity concert with the Harry James Orchestra in Los Angeles, and recorded "Gomen nasai" on Federal (catalog No. 12140; 7" vinyl) together with an anonymous "GI Joe" on guest vocals.
- Eddy Howard and his Orchestra also recorded the song, reaching No. 17 on the US charts.
- The song was also recorded successfully by Harry Belafonte, released in 1953 as his debut single. Belafonte's recording went to No. 19.
