= Bernard DeVoto =

American historian and author (1897–1955)

- Born: Bernard Augustine DeVoto; January 11, 1897; Ogden, Utah, U.S.
- Died: November 13, 1955 (aged 58); New York City, U.S.
- Education: Harvard University
- Occupation: Writer
- Spouse: Avis DeVoto (m. 1923)
- Children: 2
- Writing career
- Period: 1932–1955
- Genre: History
- Subject: Western United States
- Notable awards: Pulitzer Prize for History (1948); National Book Award for Nonfiction (1953)

Bernard Augustine DeVoto (January 11, 1897 – November 13, 1955) was an American historian, conservationist, essayist, columnist, teacher, editor, and reviewer. He was the author of a series of Pulitzer-Prize-winning popular histories of the American West and for many years wrote The Easy Chair, an influential column in Harper's Magazine. DeVoto also wrote several well-regarded novels and during the 1950s served as a speech-writer for Adlai Stevenson. His friend and biographer, Wallace Stegner described DeVoto as "flawed, brilliant, provocative, outrageous, ... often wrong, often spectacularly right, always stimulating, sometimes infuriating, and never, never dull."

== Early life and education ==
DeVoto was born on January 11, 1897, in Ogden, Utah, to Florian and Rhoda DeVoto. DeVoto's father was a Catholic of Italian descent, an educated, impoverished man; his mother was the daughter of a Mormon farmer; and their son was not accepted by either community. DeVoto attended Ogden High School and worked briefly at the Ogden Standard after graduating. He attended the University of Utah for one year, then transferred to Harvard University, entering as a member of the class of 1918. He interrupted his education to serve in the Army in World War I, then returned to school and graduated in 1920.

== Career ==
DeVoto began his career in 1922 as an English instructor at Northwestern University. He also began publishing articles and novels (under the pseudonyms "John August" and "Cady Hewes"). In 1927 he resigned from Northwestern. He and his wife Avis moved to Massachusetts in order to attempt to earn his living from writing along with part-time instructing at Harvard University. (His ambition of attaining a permanent position at Harvard was never realized.) He also edited the Harvard Graduates' Magazine from 1930 to 1932. A series of articles he published in Harper's Magazine is credited with bringing the influential work of Italian economist Vilfredo Pareto to wide audiences. This led to a regular Harper's column, "The Easy Chair," which DeVoto wrote from 1935 until his death.

DeVoto was also an authority on Mark Twain and served as a curator and editor for Twain's papers; this work culminated in several publications, including the best-selling Letters From the Earth, which appeared only in 1962. From 1936 to 1938, he worked in New York City, where he was editor of the Saturday Review of Literature, after which he returned to Massachusetts.

It was during his tenure as editor of the Saturday Review that DeVoto produced one of his most controversial pieces, "Genius is Not Enough," a scathing review of Thomas Wolfe's The Story of a Novel, in which the novelist recounted his method of writing his autobiographical Of Time and the River, as essentially submitting undigested first drafts to be transformed into finished work by others. According to DeVoto, Wolfe's writing was "hacked and shaped and compressed into something resembling a novel by [his editor] Mr. Perkins and the assembly-line at Scribners." Although in passing acknowledging Wolfe's genius, DeVoto excoriated his lack of artistry, "Mr. Wolfe ... has written some of the finest fiction in our day. But a great part of what he writes is not fiction at all: it is only material with which he has struggled but which has defeated him... Until Mr. Wolfe develops more craftsmanship, he will not be the important novelist he is now widely accepted as being." DeVoto's essay was a decisive factor in Wolfe's subsequent cutting ties with Scribners and editor Maxwell Perkins shortly before his death in 1938 and had a devastating effect on Wolfe's posthumous literary reputation.

The decade between 1943 and 1953 saw the completion of what John L. Thomas called DeVoto's "magnificent trilogy of the discovery, settling, and exploitation of the West": The Year of Decision: 1846 (1943); Across the Wide Missouri (1947); The Course of Empire (1952). Across the Wide Missouri was the recipient of the Pulitzer Prize for History and the inaugural Bancroft Prize in 1948 and The Course of Empire received National Book Award for Nonfiction in 1953. DeVoto was the first Utahn to win a Pulitzer. He also edited a selection of The Journals of Lewis and Clark (1953). A book on the history, geography, and ecology of the American West remained unfinished at his death in 1955; in 2001, an edited version was published as Western Paradox.

DeVoto and his wife, Avis, fought efforts by Nevada Senator Pat McCarran and affluent cowboys to destroy protections on federal lands in Western America, a plan DeVoto uncovered himself. This led to the FBI opening a case on him.

== Accusations of Communism ==
As early as 1938, when the Dies Committee was investigating radical professors and a Soviet takeover of America, DeVoto "mocked the conspiracy nuts" and yet was called "fascist" by the liberal critics. In the 1950s, he felt "a Communist or two on any faculty constituted a far smaller danger than the procedures that would be necessary to keep them off." He also opposed the outlawing of the Communist Party USA. "Historian Bernard DeVoto spoke for many liberals" in disdaining "the prominence ex-communists had gained in public life during the Cold War." He argued that despite the new-found patriotism of conservative ex-Communists, their commitments to absolutism and authoritarianism remained the same and continued to threaten freedom.

In April 1953, DeVoto's Easy Chair column criticized "The Case of the Censorious Congressman" during Senate Internal Security Subcommittee and House Un-American Activities Committee hearings of teachers. U.S. Representative Carroll D. Kearns called DeVoto "pro-Communist."

== Personal life and death ==
DeVoto married Avis MacVicar (1904–1989), a book reviewer, editor, and avid cook. She became friends with Julia Child. Child had written a fan letter to Bernard DeVoto regarding an article of his in Harper's Magazine; he had stated just how much he detested stainless steel knives, and Child thought he was "100% right". Avis' response began a long correspondence and friendship between the two women during Child's work on her groundbreaking Mastering the Art of French Cooking (1961). Child acknowledged Avis as "wet nurse" and "mentor" to the undertaking. The DeVotos' son Mark (b. 1940) is a music theorist, composer, and retired professor at Tufts University. Their older son Gordon, a writer, died in 2009.

DeVoto died on November 13, 1955, at age 58.

== Works ==
- The Crooked Mile (1924) novel
- The Chariot of Fire (1926) novel
- The House of Sun-Goes-Down. New York: Macmillan. OCLC 613154969. (1928) novel
- Mark Twain's America (1932)
- We Accept With Pleasure (1934) novel
- Life Begins So Soon (1936) novel, serialized in 10 parts Collier's February 1, 1936, through April 4, 1936
- Genius is not Enough (1936) criticism
- Forays and Rebuttals (1936) essays
- Mark Twain, Letters from the Earth (1938), editor
- Troubled Star, by John August (1939) novel
- Rain Before Seven, by John August (1940) novel
- Mark Twain in Eruption (1940), editor
- Minority Report (1940) essays
- Mark Twain at Work (1942), editor
- Advance Agent, by John August (1942) novel
- The Year of Decision, 1846. Boston: Houghton Mifflin. 2016. ISBN 978-1787200357. OCLC 490177177. (1942)
- The Literary Fallacy (1944), criticism
- The Portable Mark Twain (1946, editor)
- Across the Wide Missouri, With an Account of the Discovery of the Miller Collection (1947) [Pulitzer Prize winner] ISBN 0395924979
- Mountain Time (1946) novel
- The Hour: A Cocktail Manifesto (1951)
- The World of Fiction (1950)
- The Course of Empire (1952) [National Book Award]
- The Journals of Lewis and Clark (1953, editor)
- The Easy Chair (1955) essays
- Women and Children First by Cady Hewes (1956) essays
- The Letters of Bernard DeVoto (1975, edited by Wallace Stegner)
- The Western Paradox (2001, edited by Douglas Brinkley and Patricia Nelson Limerick)
- DeVoto's West: History, Conservation, and the Public Good (2002, edited by Edward K. Muller)
- The Selected Letters of Bernard DeVoto and Katharine Sterne (2012, edited by Mark DeVoto)

== Sources ==
- Stegner, Wallace E., The Uneasy Chair: A Biography of Bernard DeVoto (1974)
- Stegner, Wallace E., ed., The Letters of Bernard DeVoto (1975)
- Topping, Gary. Utah Historians and the Reconstruction of Western History (Norman, OK: University of Oklahoma Press, 2003), ISBN 0806135611
- Saveur Magazine, #134, December 2010, p. 41.
- Wild, Peter (1978). "9: Bernard DeVoto: On the Barricades". Pioneer Conservationists of Western America. Edward Abbey (Introduction). Missoula: Mountain Press Publishing. pp. 104–111. ISBN 0878421076.
