= John Hodiak =

American actor (1914–1955)

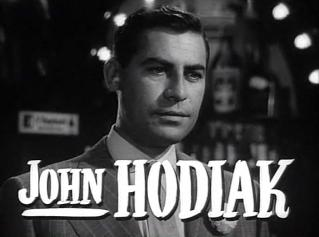
- Hodiak in A Lady Without Passport (1950)
- Born: April 16, 1914; Pittsburgh, Pennsylvania, U.S.
- Died: October 19, 1955 (aged 41); Los Angeles, California, U.S.
- Resting place: Calvary Cemetery, Los Angeles, California, U.S.
- Years active: 1939–1955
- Spouse: Anne Baxter (m. 1946; div. 1953)
- Children: 1

John Hodiak (/ˈhoʊ.diː.æk/ HOH-dee-ak; April 16, 1914 – October 19, 1955) was an American actor who worked in radio, stage and film.

== Early life ==
Hodiak was born in Pittsburgh, Pennsylvania, the son of Anna (Pogorzelec) and Walter Hodiak. He was of Ukrainian and Polish descent. Hodiak spent eight years in Pittsburgh before moving to Hamtramck, Michigan.

== Career ==
=== Radio ===
When Hodiak first tried out for a radio acting job, he was turned down because of his accent. He became a caddie at a Detroit golf course, then worked at a Chevrolet automobile factory – and practised his diction. When he conquered the diction hurdle, he became a radio actor and moved to Chicago. There Hodiak created the role of the comic strip character Li'l Abner on radio.

Hodiak also had the role of McCullough in the radio soap opera Girl Alone.

=== Hollywood ===
Hodiak was cast in a few small parts at MGM, including A Stranger in Town (1943), I Dood It (1943) and Maisie Goes to Reno (1944).

=== Stardom ===
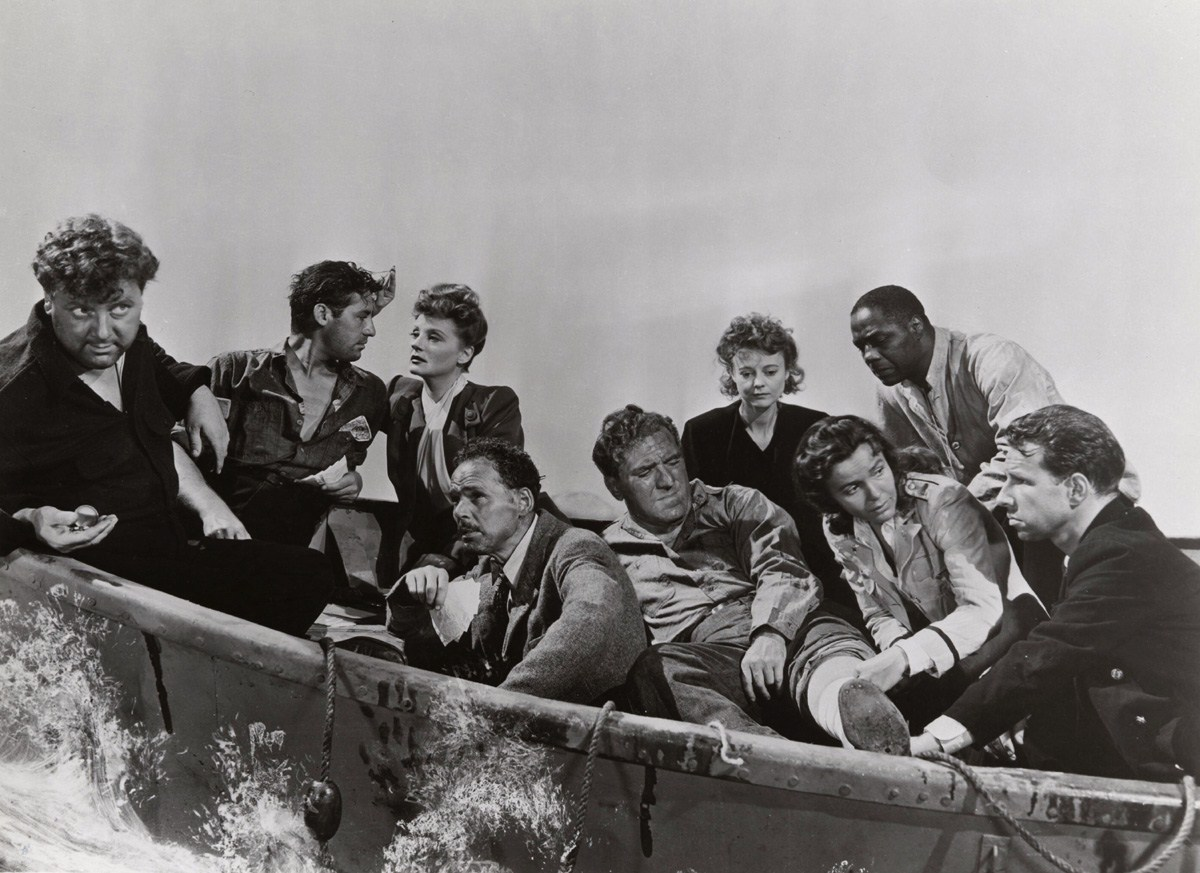
L-R: Walter Slezak, John Hodiak, Tallulah Bankhead, Henry Hull, William Bendix, Heather Angel, Mary Anderson, Canada Lee, and Hume Cronyn in Alfred Hitchcock's Lifeboat (1944)

Hodiak then caught the eye of director Alfred Hitchcock, and on loan to 20th Century Fox, he was featured in Lifeboat (1944) opposite Tallulah Bankhead.

MGM cast him in the third lead in Song of Russia (1944), supporting Robert Taylor and Susan Peters. He was Ann Sothern's love interest in Maisie Goes to Reno (1944) and had a role in Marriage Is a Private Affair (1944).

20th Century Fox borrowed Hodiak again to play the title role in Sunday Dinner for a Soldier (1944), with Anne Baxter, whom he married in real life. Fox kept him on to play Maj. Joppolo in A Bell for Adano (1945) with Gene Tierney.

At MGM, Hodiak had a role as Judy Garland's love interest in The Harvey Girls (1946).

Fox gave him a starring role in Somewhere in the Night (1946), directed by Joseph L. Mankiewicz. Hodiak acted with Lucille Ball in MGM's Two Smart People (1946), which lost money, as did the film noir The Arnelo Affair (1947).

=== Supporting actor ===
Hodiak went to Paramount for Desert Fury (1947), playing the lead with Lizabeth Scott and Burt Lancaster. He starred in Love from a Stranger (1947) for Eagle Lion, then supported Lana Turner and Clark Gable in Homecoming (1948). He supported Gable again in Command Decision (1948). The two Gable films were hits but Hodiak was voted "box office poison" by exhibitors at the end of 1948.

Hodiak was down the cast list for The Bribe (1949). He was second billed in MGM's war film Battleground (1949), a huge success. Also popular was Malaya (1949) where Hodiak supported James Stewart and Spencer Tracy.

Hodiak was a love rival for Robert Taylor in Ambush (1950), a popular Western. MGM gave him another lead role, co-starring with Hedy Lamarr in A Lady Without Passport (1950), but it lost money. He was third billed in The Miniver Story (1950), the flop sequel to Mrs. Miniver, and fourth lead in Night into Morning (1951), an unsuccessful drama.

Hodiak supported Spencer Tracy in The People Against O'Hara (1951) and Clark Gable in Across the Wide Missouri (1952). He was second billed to Walter Pidgeon in The Sellout (1953).

=== Broadway and B movies ===
In 1952, Hodiak went to New York City and made his Broadway debut in The Chase by Horton Foote and directed by José Ferrer. The play was a failure, but its star received positive notices.

Hodiak went to Allied Artists to star in the movie Battle Zone (1952). He starred in two Westerns, Ambush at Tomahawk Gap (1953) and Conquest of Cochise (1953), and then the war movies Mission Over Korea (1953) and Dragonfly Squadron (1954).

He originated the role of Lieutenant Maryk in Paul Gregory's production of the play The Caine Mutiny Court Martial (1954–1955) by Herman Wouk adapted from his novel The Caine Mutiny. The play, starring Henry Fonda and Lloyd Nolan, ran for two years, and Hodiak's portrayal brought him acclaim.

When the show closed after its U.S. tour, Hodiak began work on Trial (1955) at MGM, billed fourth as the prosecuting attorney. When it wrapped, he played Major Ward Thomas in On the Threshold of Space (1956) at 20th Century Fox.

== Personal life ==
Hodiak and actress Anne Baxter (whom he met while they were starring in Sunday Dinner for a Soldier) married on July 7, 1946, and divorced on January 27, 1953. They had one daughter, Katrina Hodiak, who became an actress.

== Death ==
Hodiak died of a heart attack at the age of 41 on October 19, 1955, at his parents' home in the Tarzana neighborhood of Los Angeles. He was acting in On the Threshold of Space; it was decided that his performance was sufficient to release the movie. He is interred in Block 303, Crypt D-1 of the main mausoleum at Calvary Cemetery, East Los Angeles.

He left an estate of $25,000.

== Legacy ==
Hodiak has a star on the Hollywood Walk of Fame at 6101 Hollywood Boulevard, for his work in radio.

== Filmography ==
| Year | Film | Role | Director | Notes |
|---|---|---|---|---|
| 1943 | A Stranger in Town | Hart Ridges | Roy Rowland, John E. Burch (assistant) | |
| 1943 | I Dood It | Roy Hartwood | Vincente Minnelli | |
| 1943 | Swing Shift Maisie | Clerk | Norman Z. McLeod | uncredited |
| 1944 | Lifeboat | John Kovac | Alfred Hitchcock | |
| 1944 | Song of Russia | Boris Bulganov | László Benedek (uncredited) | |
| 1944 | Maisie Goes to Reno | Philip Francis "Flip" Hennahan | Harry Beaumont | |
| 1944 | Marriage Is a Private Affair | Lieutenant Tom Cochrane West | Robert Z. Leonard | |
| 1944 | Sunday Dinner for a Soldier | Sgt. Eric Moore | Lloyd Bacon | |
| 1945 | A Bell for Adano | Maj. Victor P. Joppola | Henry King | |
| 1946 | The Harvey Girls | Ned Trent | Robert Alton | |
| 1946 | Somewhere in the Night | George W. Taylor | Joseph L. Mankiewicz | |
| 1946 | Two Smart People | Ace Connors | Jules Dassin | |
| 1947 | The Arnelo Affair | Tony Arnelo | Arch Oboler | |
| 1947 | Desert Fury | Eddie Bendix | Lewis Allen | |
| 1947 | Love from a Stranger | Manuel Cortez | Richard Whorf | |
| 1948 | Homecoming | Dr. Robert Sunday | Mervyn LeRoy | |
| 1948 | Command Decision | Col. Edward Rayton "Ted" Martin | Sam Wood | |
| 1949 | The Bribe | Tugwell 'Tug' Hintten | Robert Z. Leonard | |
| 1949 | Battleground | Pvt. Donald Jarvess | William A. Wellman | |
| 1949 | Malaya | Kellar | Richard Thorpe | |
| 1950 | Ambush | Capt. Ben Lorrison | Sam Wood | |
| 1950 | A Lady Without Passport | Pete Karczag | Joseph H. Lewis | |
| 1950 | The Miniver Story | Spike Romway | H.C. Potter | |
| 1951 | Night into Morning | Tom Lawry | Fletcher Markle | |
| 1951 | The People Against O'Hara | Louis Barra | John Sturges | |
| 1951 | Across the Wide Missouri | Brecan | William A. Wellman | |
| 1952 | The Sellout | Chick Johnson | Gerald Mayer | |
| 1952 | Battle Zone | Danny | Lesley Selander | |
| 1953 | Ambush at Tomahawk Gap | McCord | Fred F. Sears | |
| 1953 | Mission Over Korea | Capt. George Slocum | Fred F. Sears | |
| 1953 | Conquest of Cochise | Cochise | William Castle | |
| 1954 | Dragonfly Squadron | Maj. Matthew Brady | Lesley Selander | |
| 1955 | Trial | Dist. Atty. John J. Armstrong | Mark Robson | |
| 1956 | On the Threshold of Space | Maj. Ward Thomas | Robert D. Webb | |

== Radio appearances ==
A few of Hodiak's many radio appearances:

| Year | Program | Episode/source |
|---|---|---|
| 1948 | Hallmark Playhouse | "The Desert Shall Rejoice" |
| 1952 | Suspense | "The Big Heist" |
| 1953 | Suspense | "Gold of the Adomar" |
| 1953 | Suspense | "The Mountain" |
